= List of vegetarians =

This is a list of people who have permanently adopted a vegetarian diet at some point during their life. Former vegetarians and those whose status is disputed are not included on this list.

The following list does not include vegetarians who are identified as vegan—those who do not consume produce that utilise animal derivatives such as eggs and dairy.

== List ==
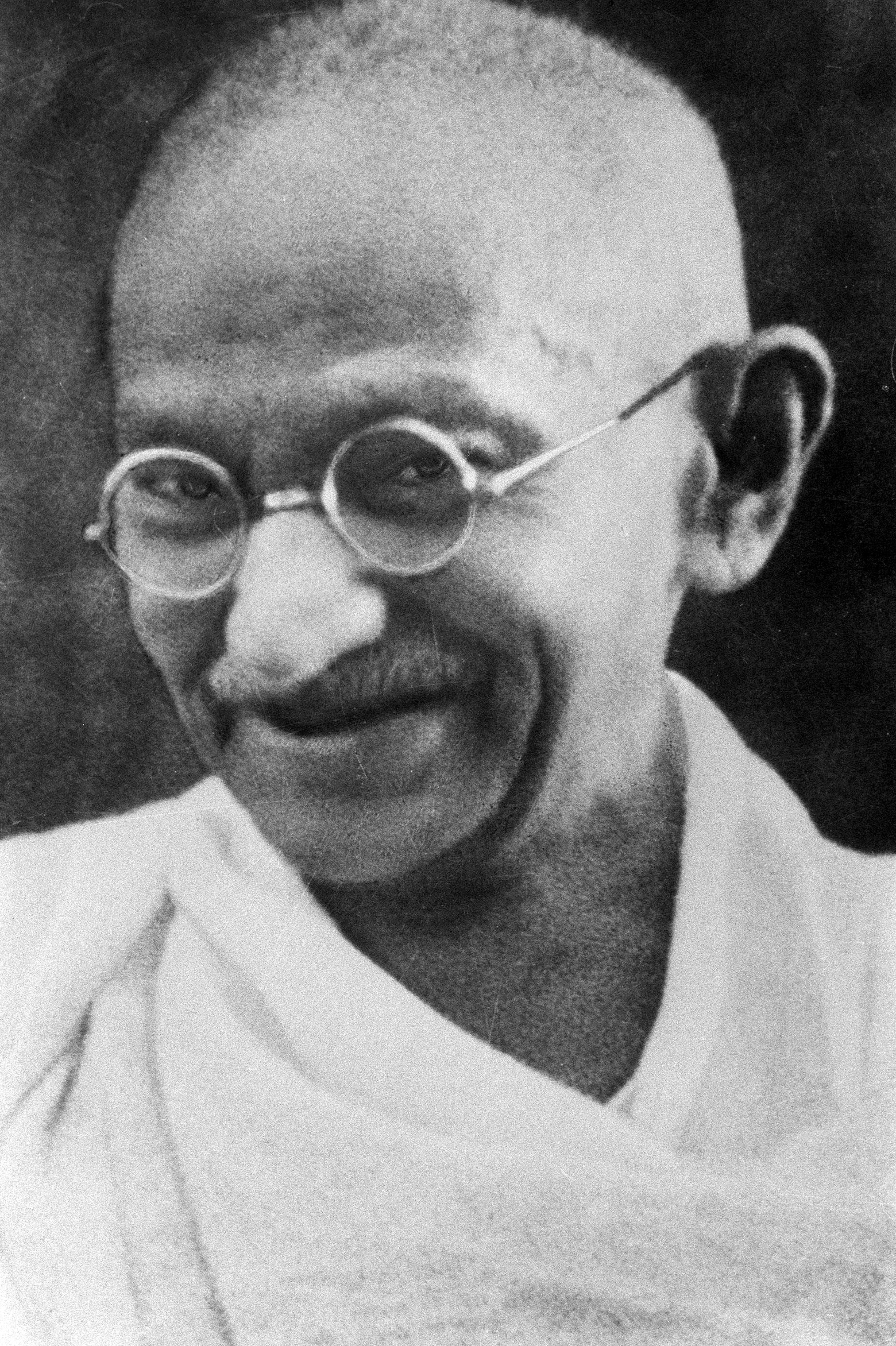
Mahatma Gandhi, Indian politician

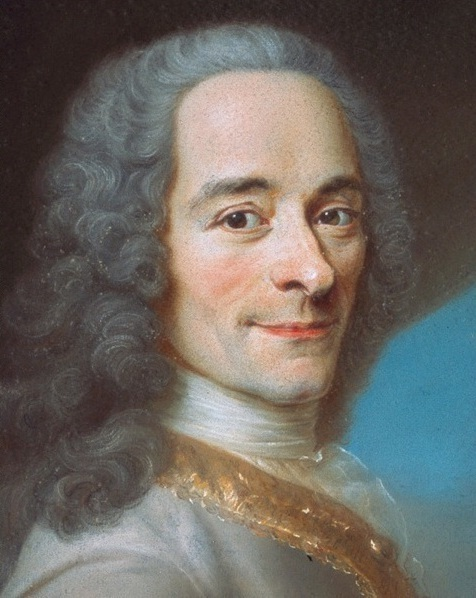
Voltaire, French philosopher

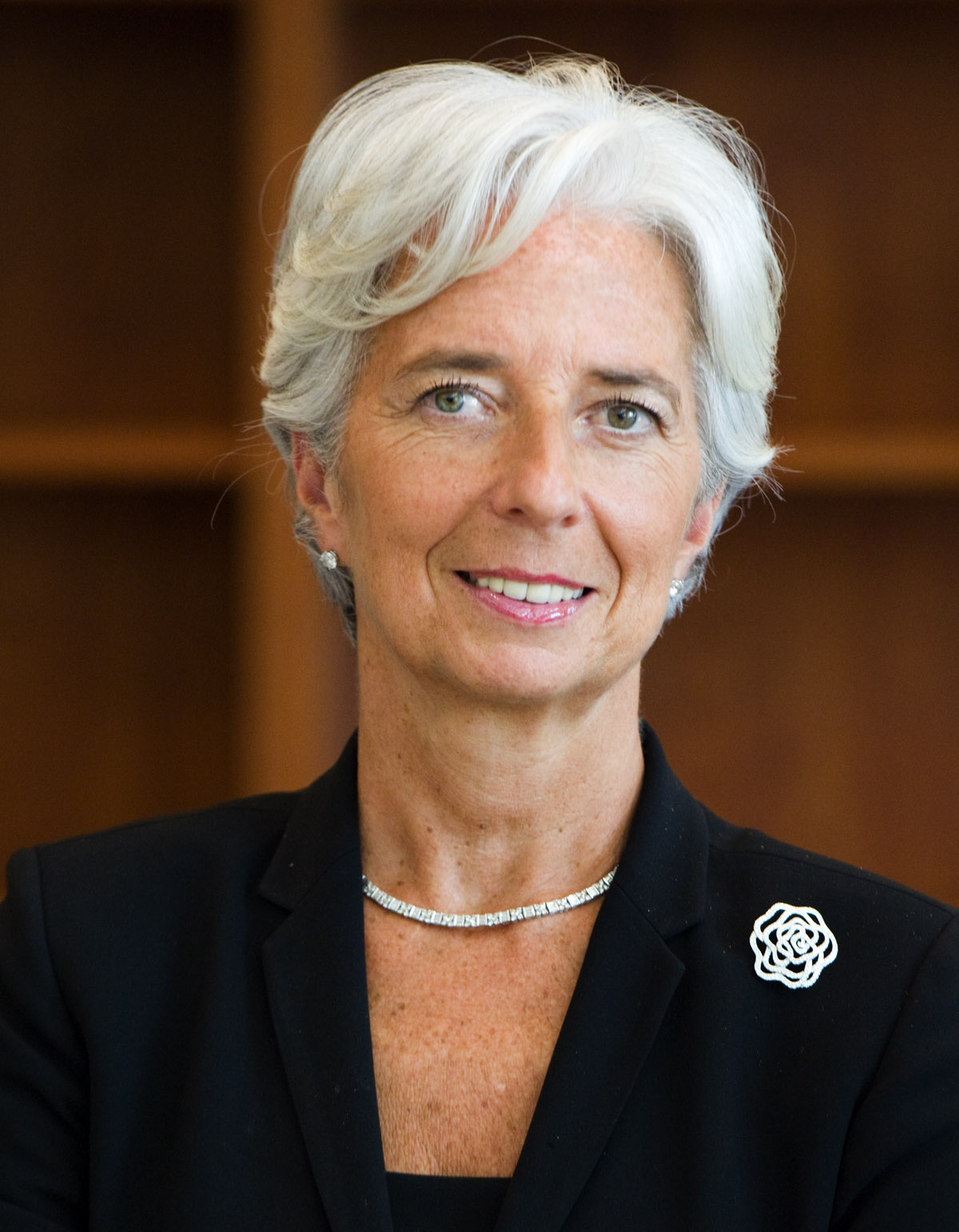
Christine Lagarde, French politician

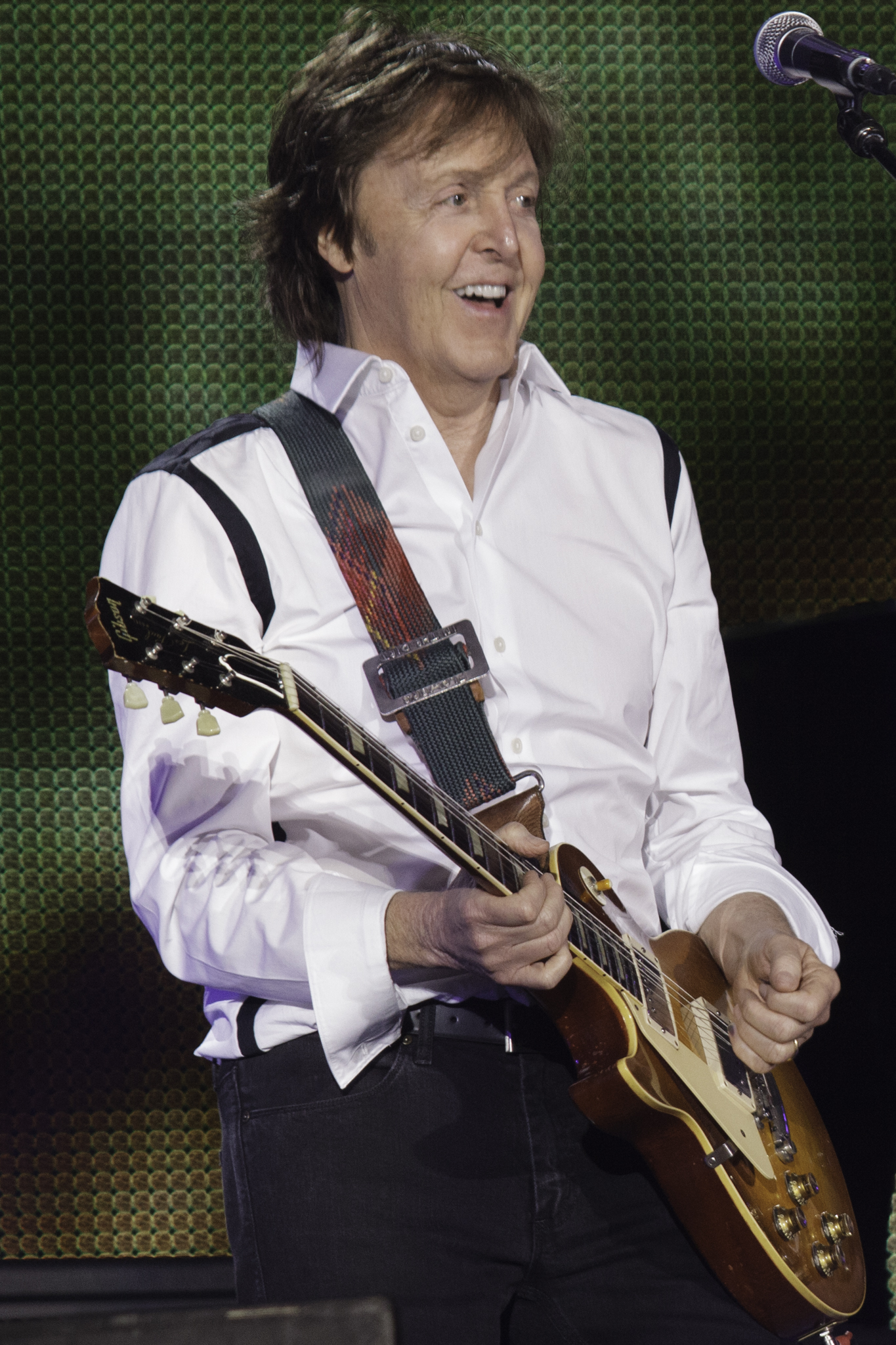
Paul McCartney, British musician

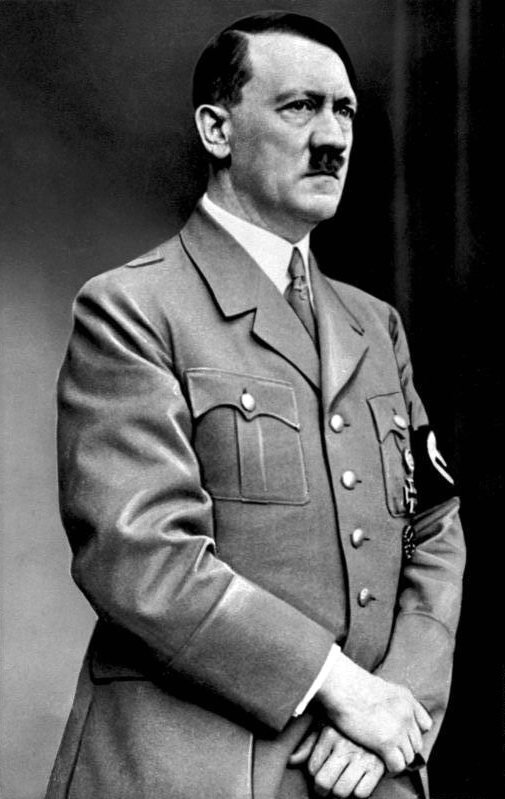
Adolf Hitler, German politician

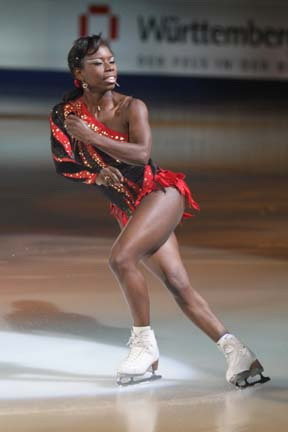
Surya Bonaly, French professional figure skater

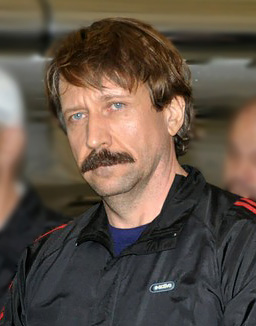
Viktor Bout, Russian arms dealer

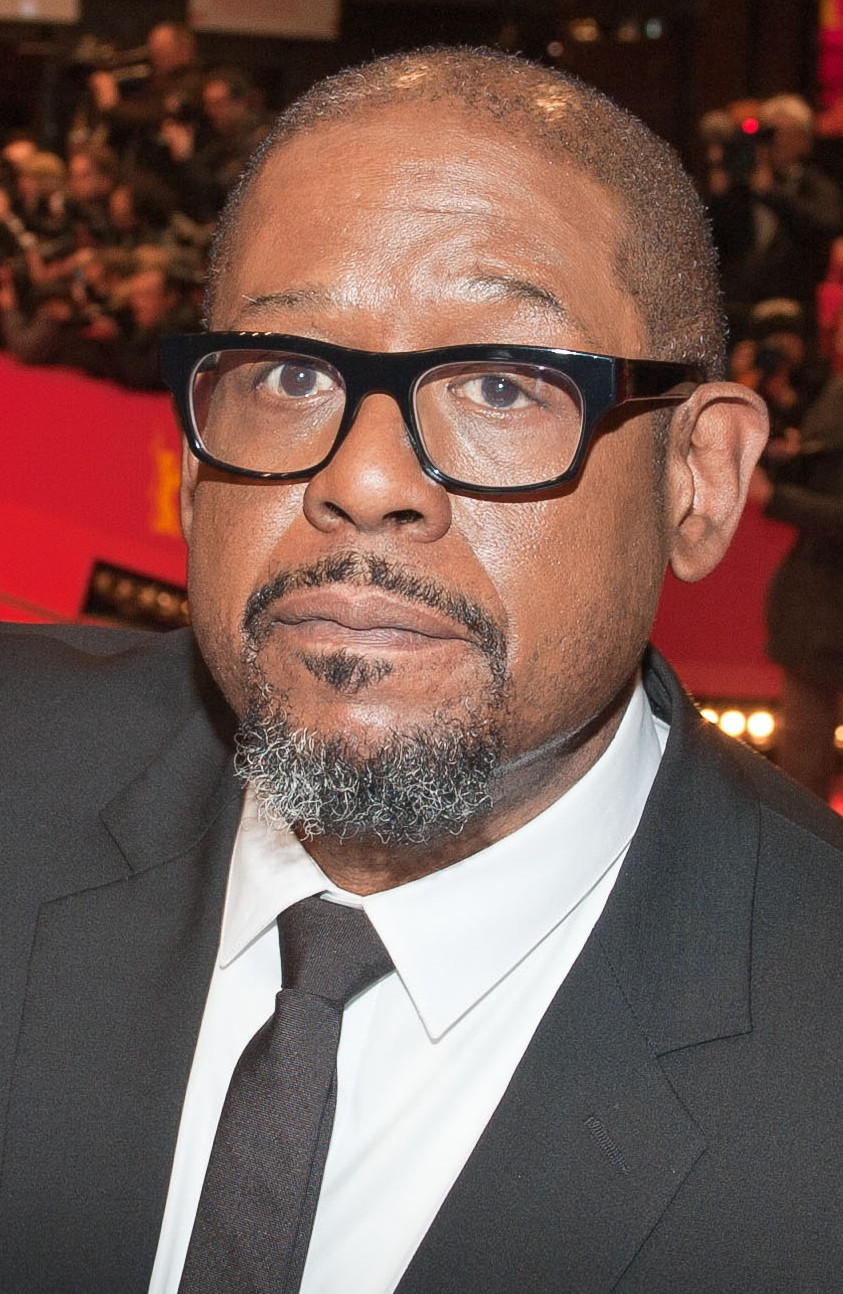
Forest Whitaker, Academy Award-winning American actor

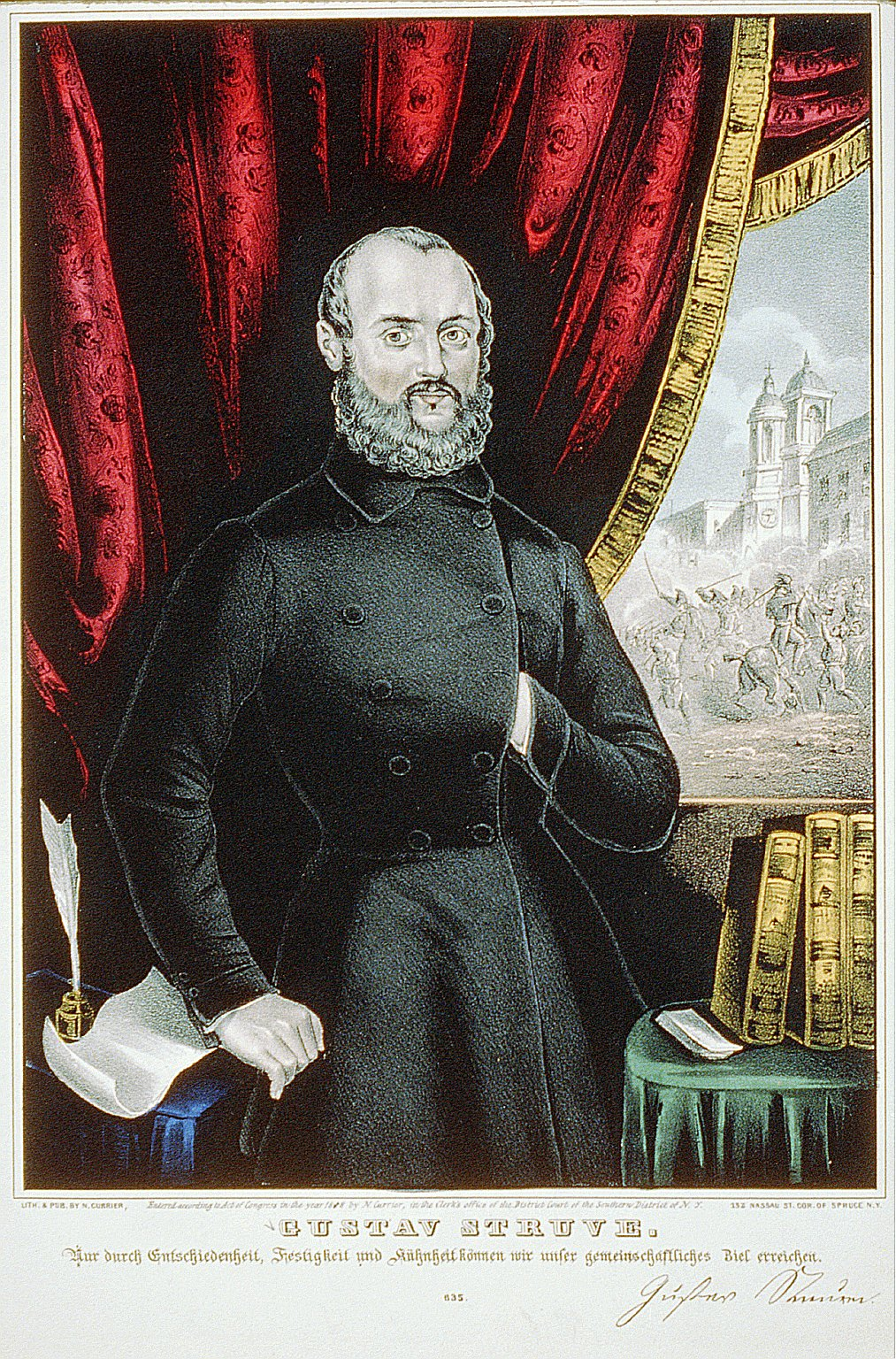
Gustav Struve, German revolutionary

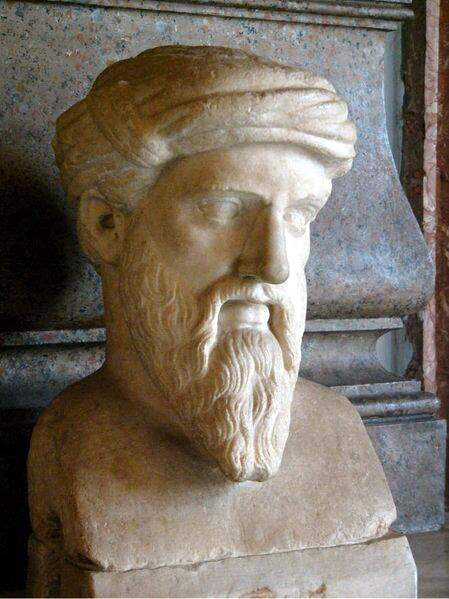
Pythagoras of Samos, Greek philosopher and founder of Pythagoreanism

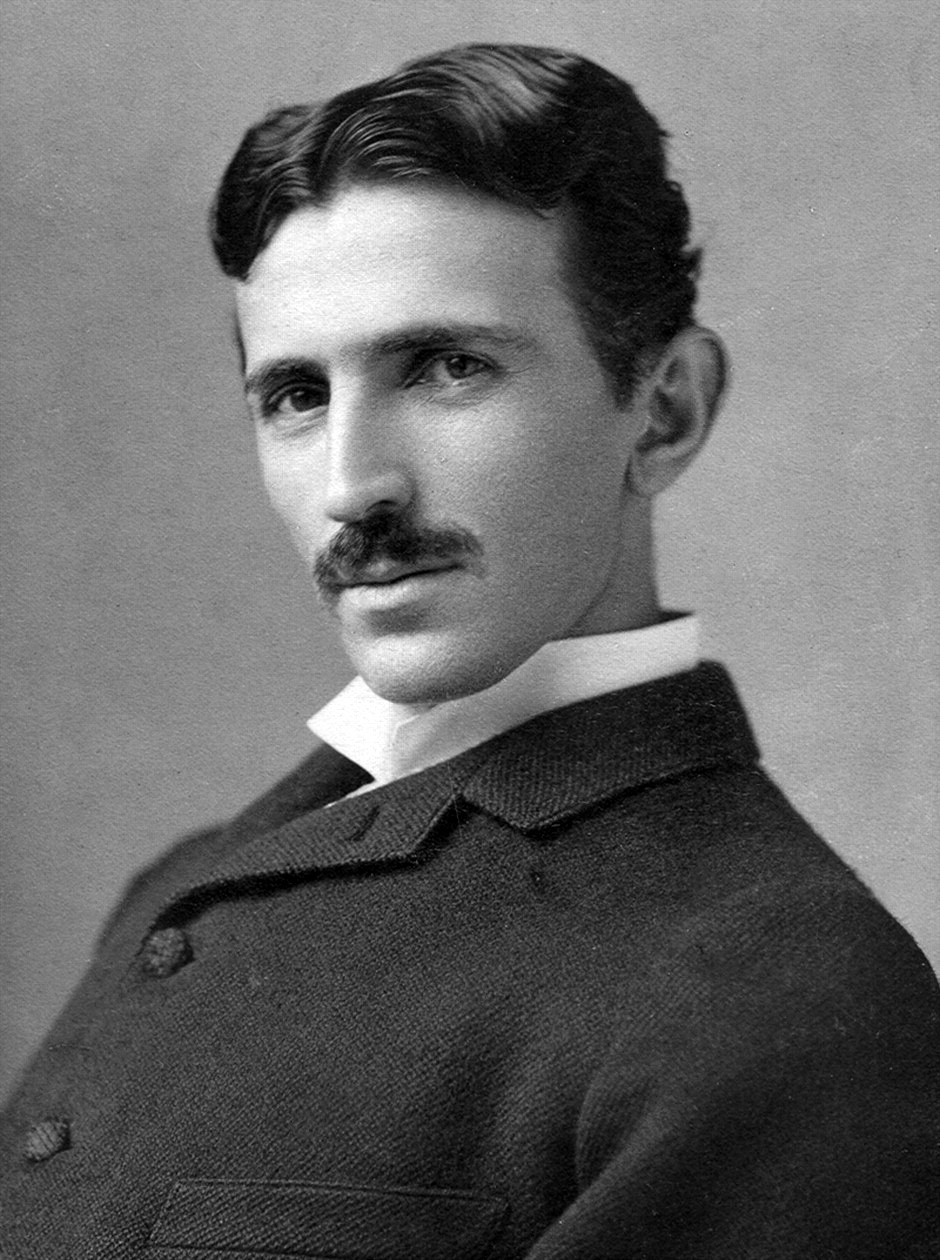
Nikola Tesla, Serbian-American inventor

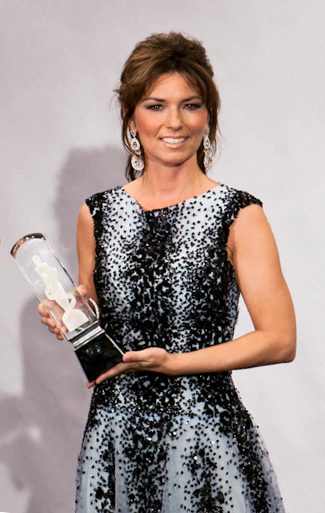
Shania Twain, Canadian singer

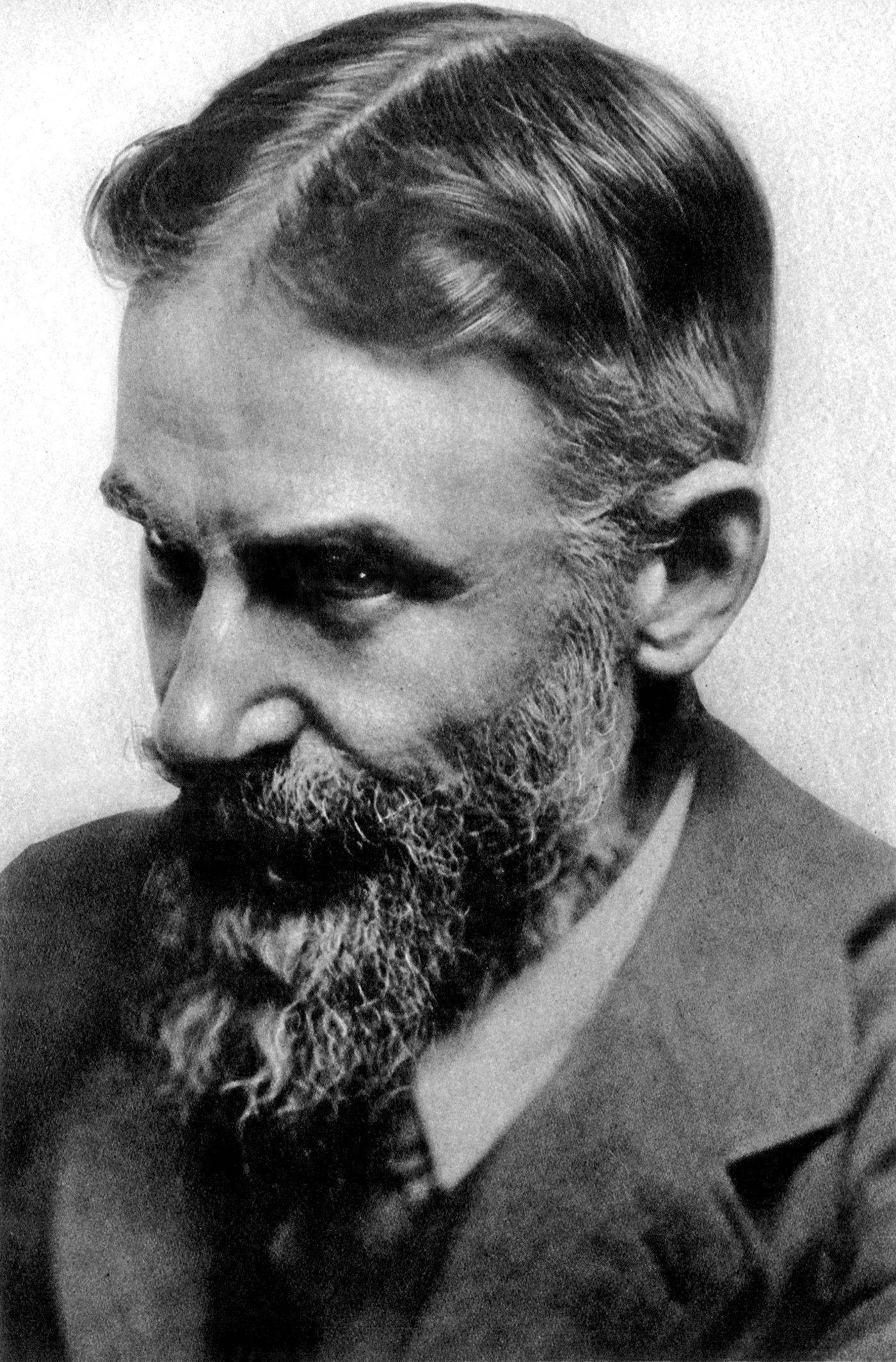
George Bernard Shaw, Irish playwright

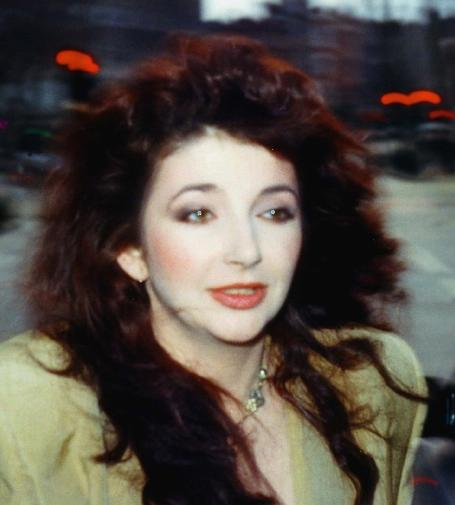
Kate Bush, British singer-songwriter

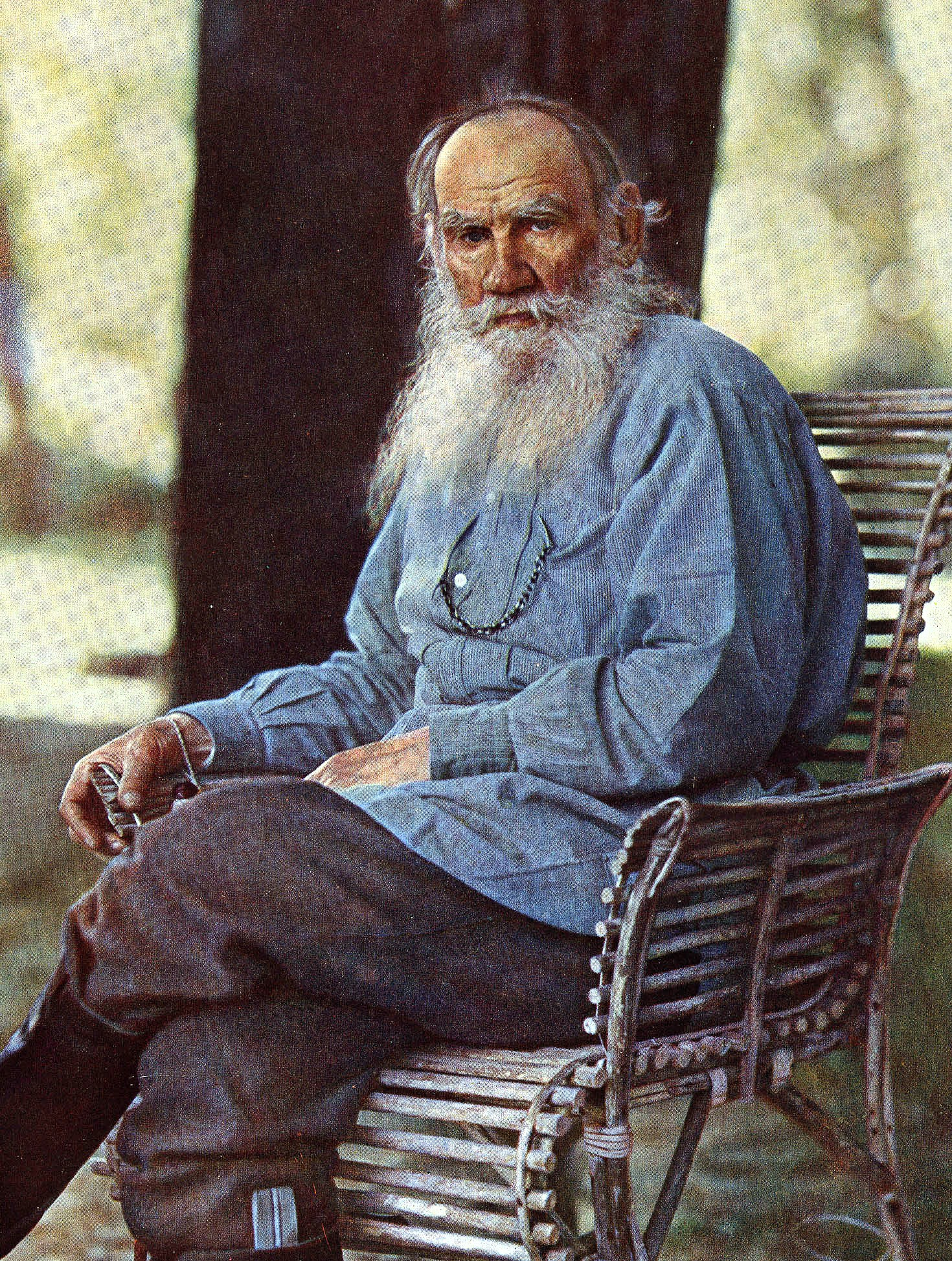
Leo Tolstoy, Russian writer

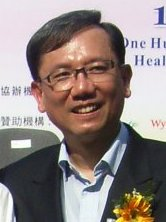
Lo Wing-lok, Hong Kong doctor and politician

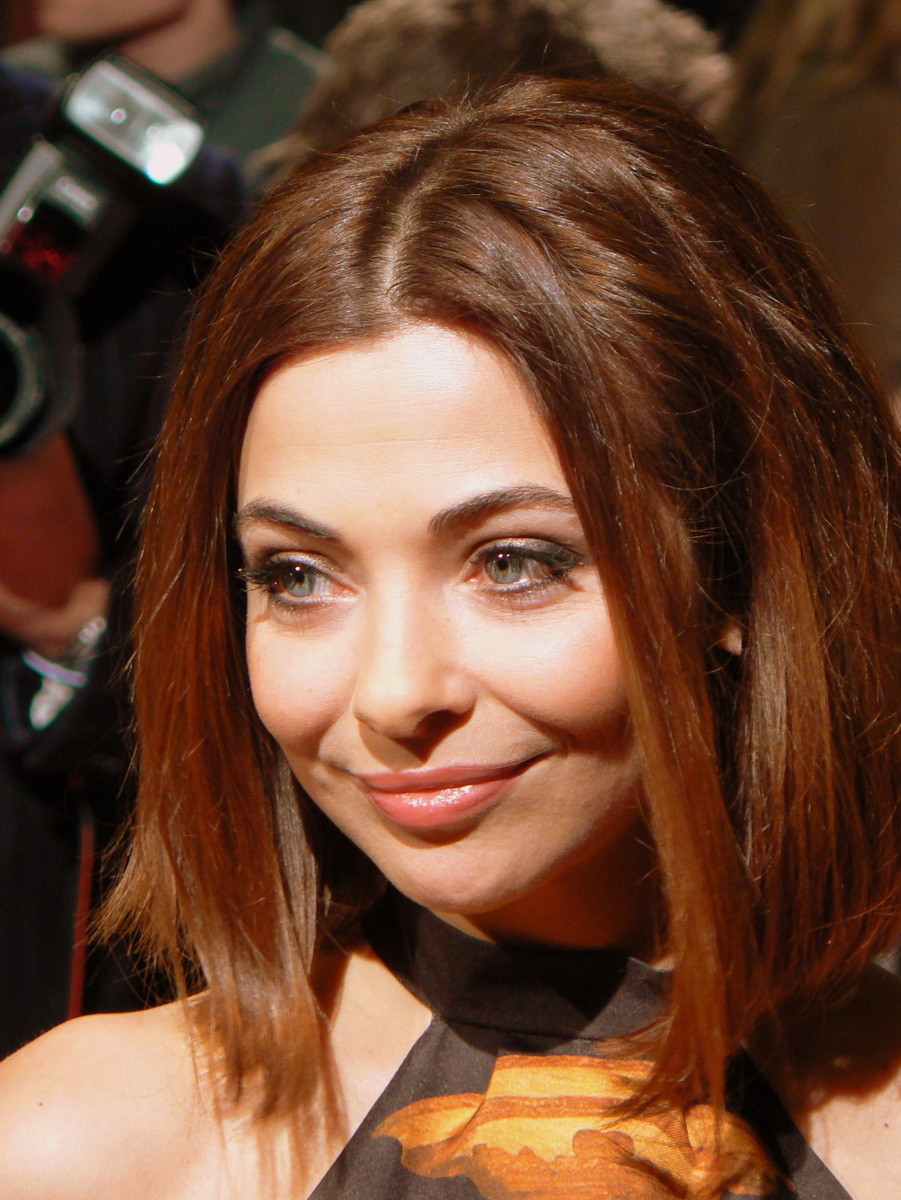
Georgina Verbaan, Dutch actress

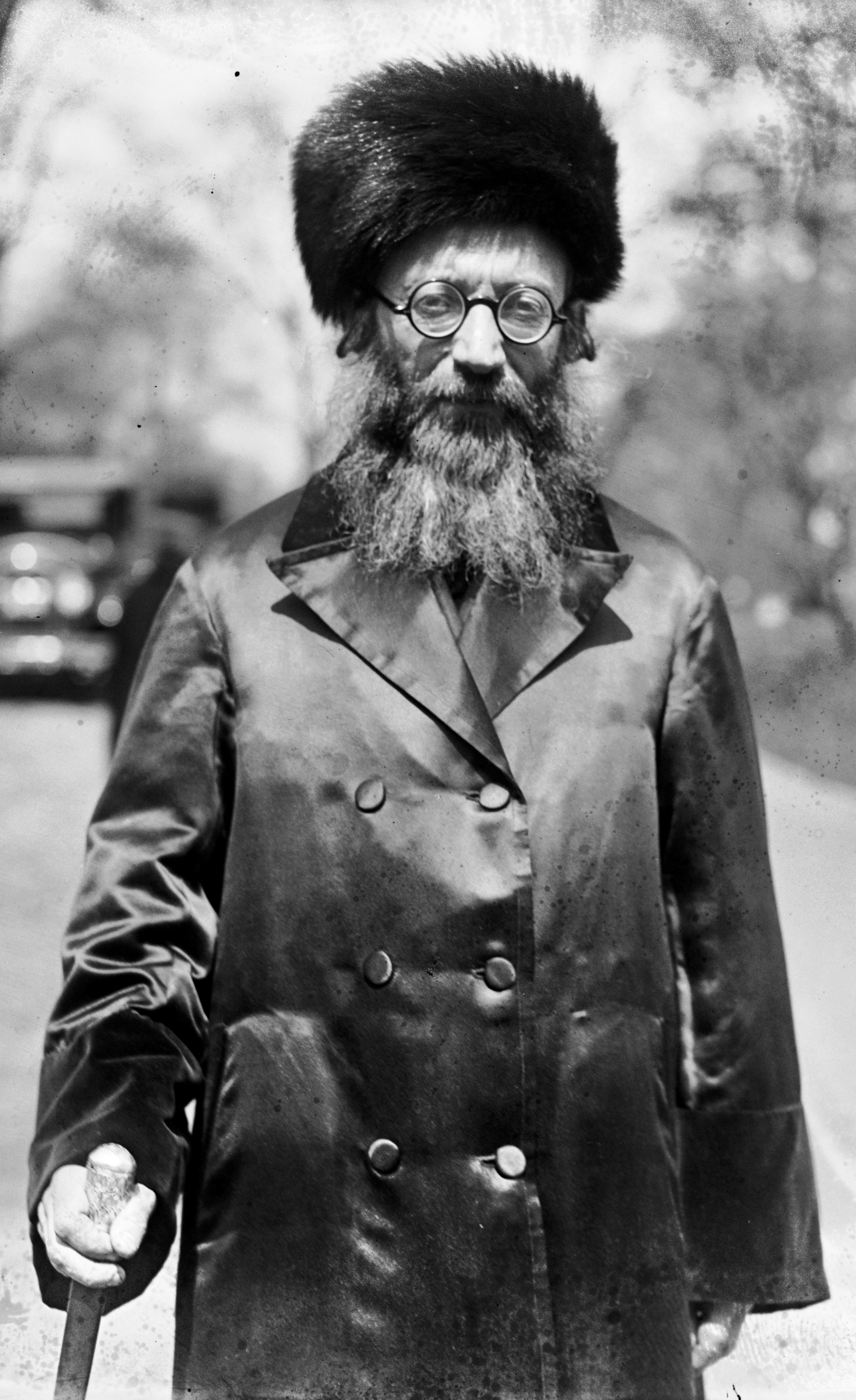
Abraham Isaac Kook, the first Ashkenazi chief rabbi of the British Mandate for Palestine, born in Latvia

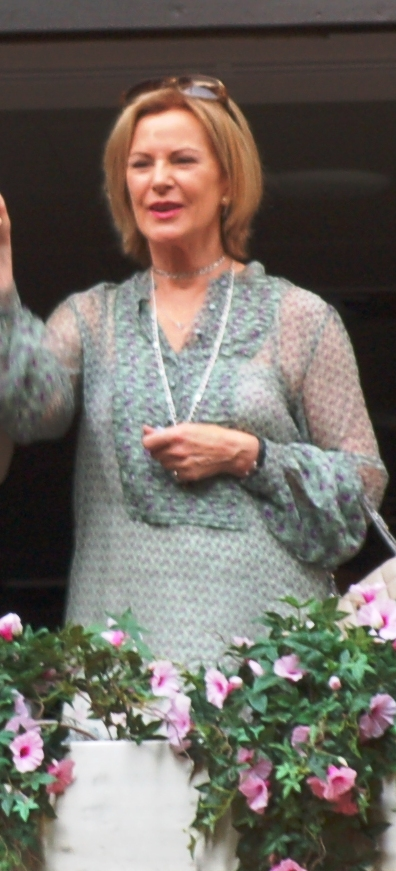
Anni-Frid Lyngstad, Norwegian singer and member of Swedish pop group ABBA

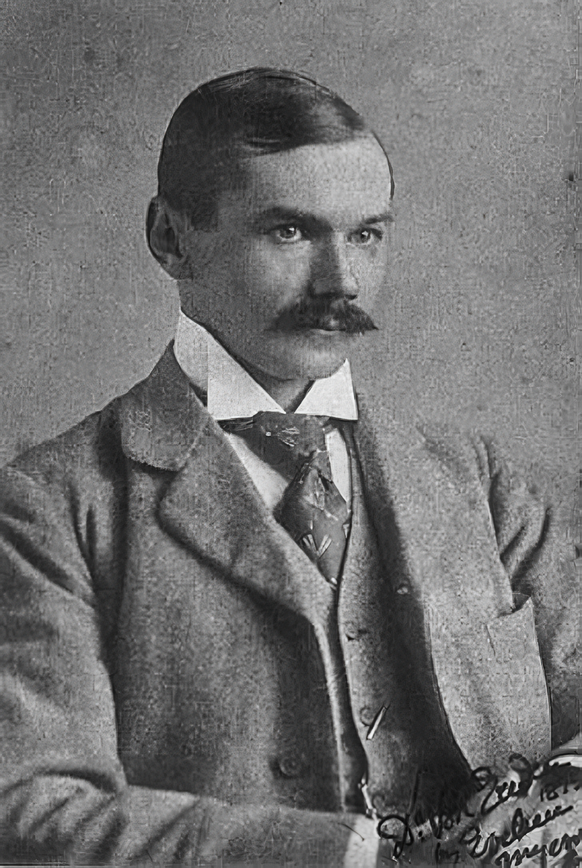
Frederik van Eeden, Dutch writer and psychiatrist

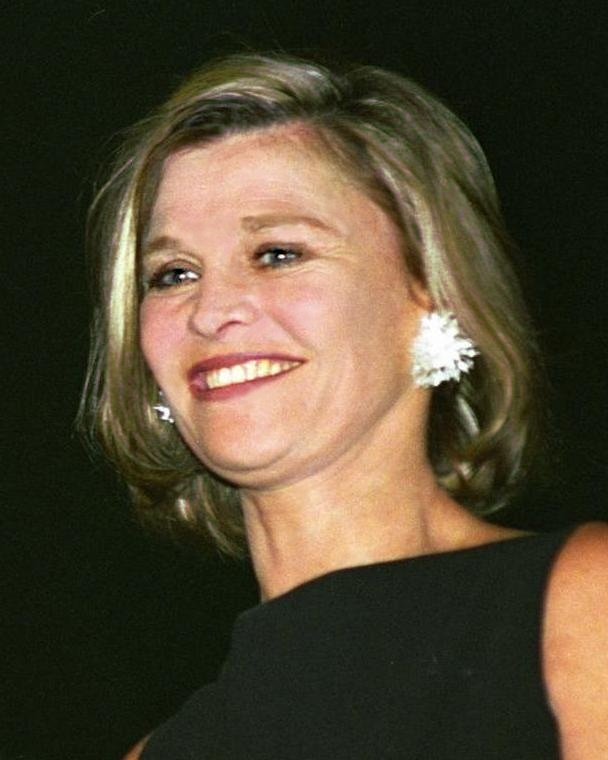
Julie Christie, British actress

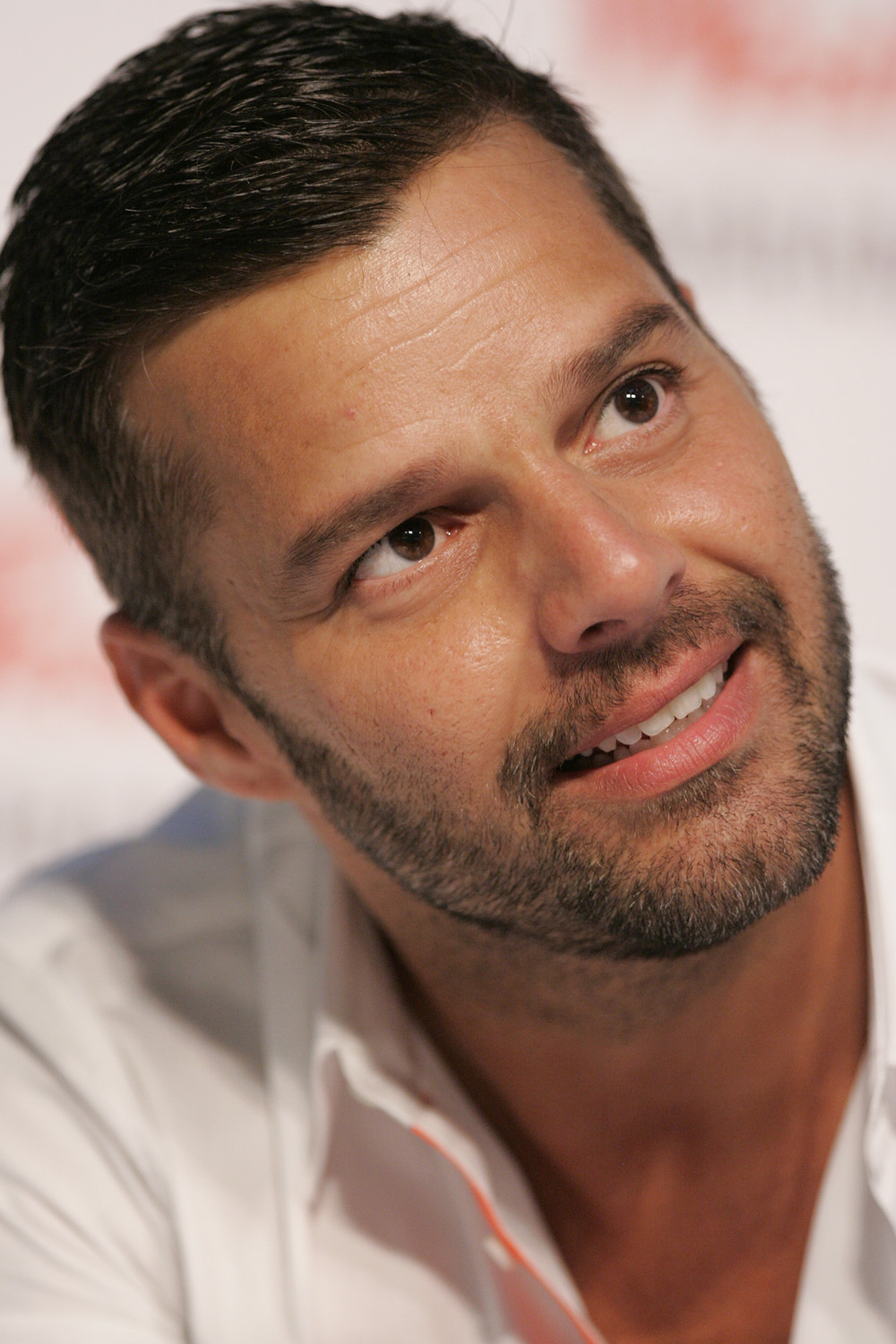
Ricky Martin, Puerto Rican singer

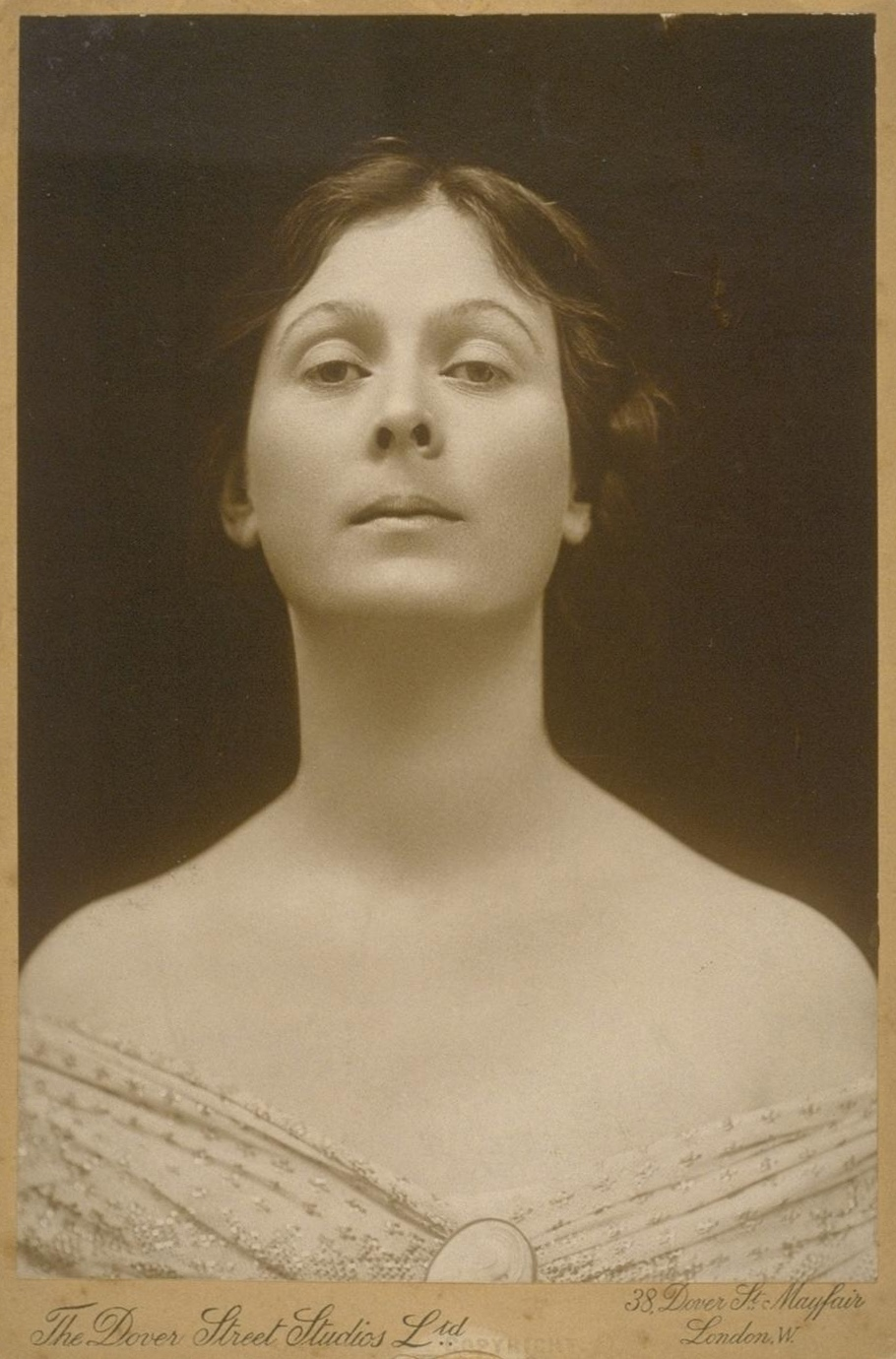
Isadora Duncan, American dancer often credited as the creator of modern dance

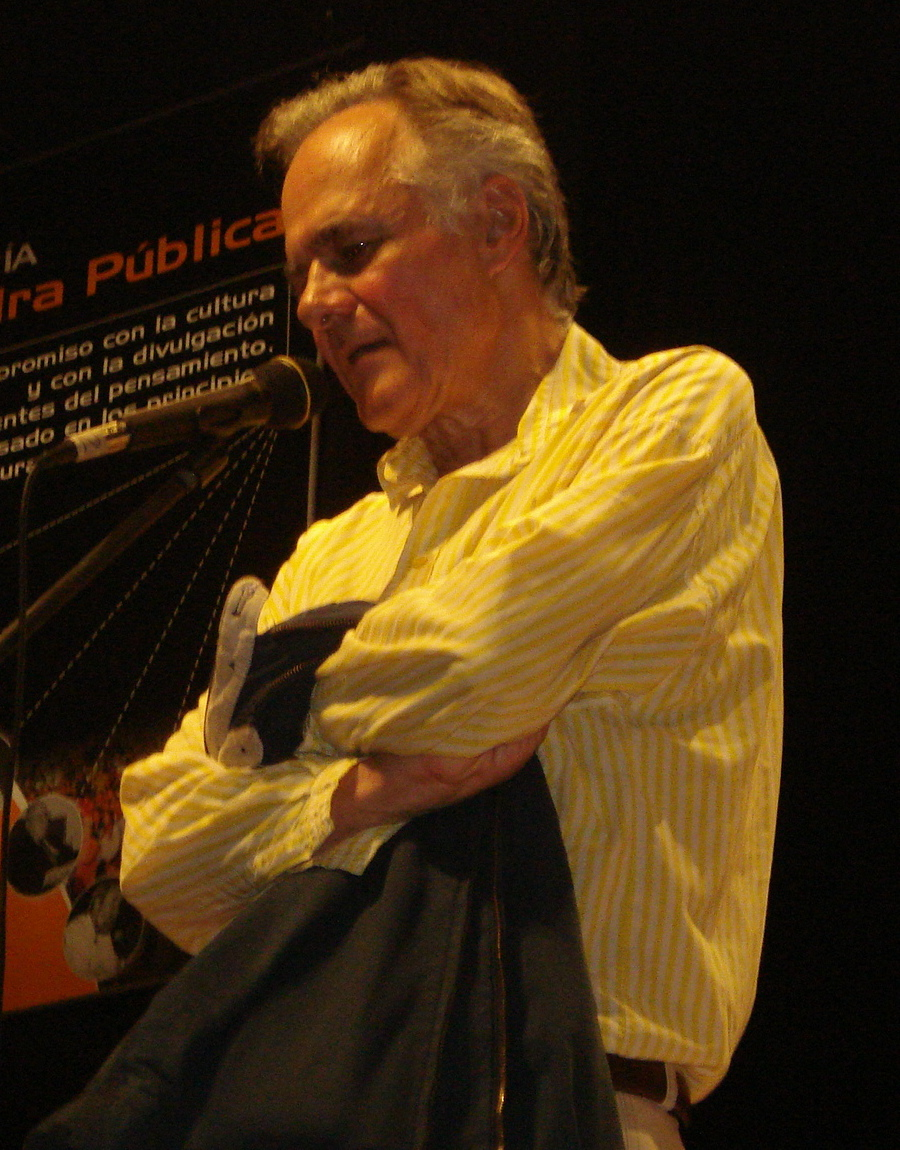
Fernando Vallejo, Colombian writer

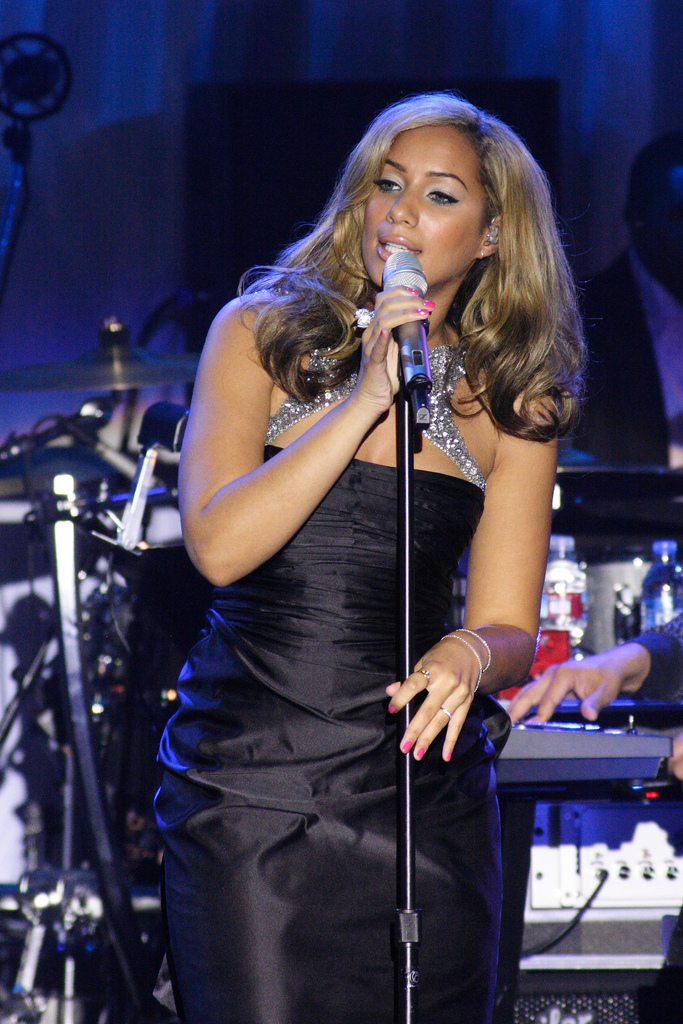
Leona Lewis, British singer and winner of the third series of The X Factor

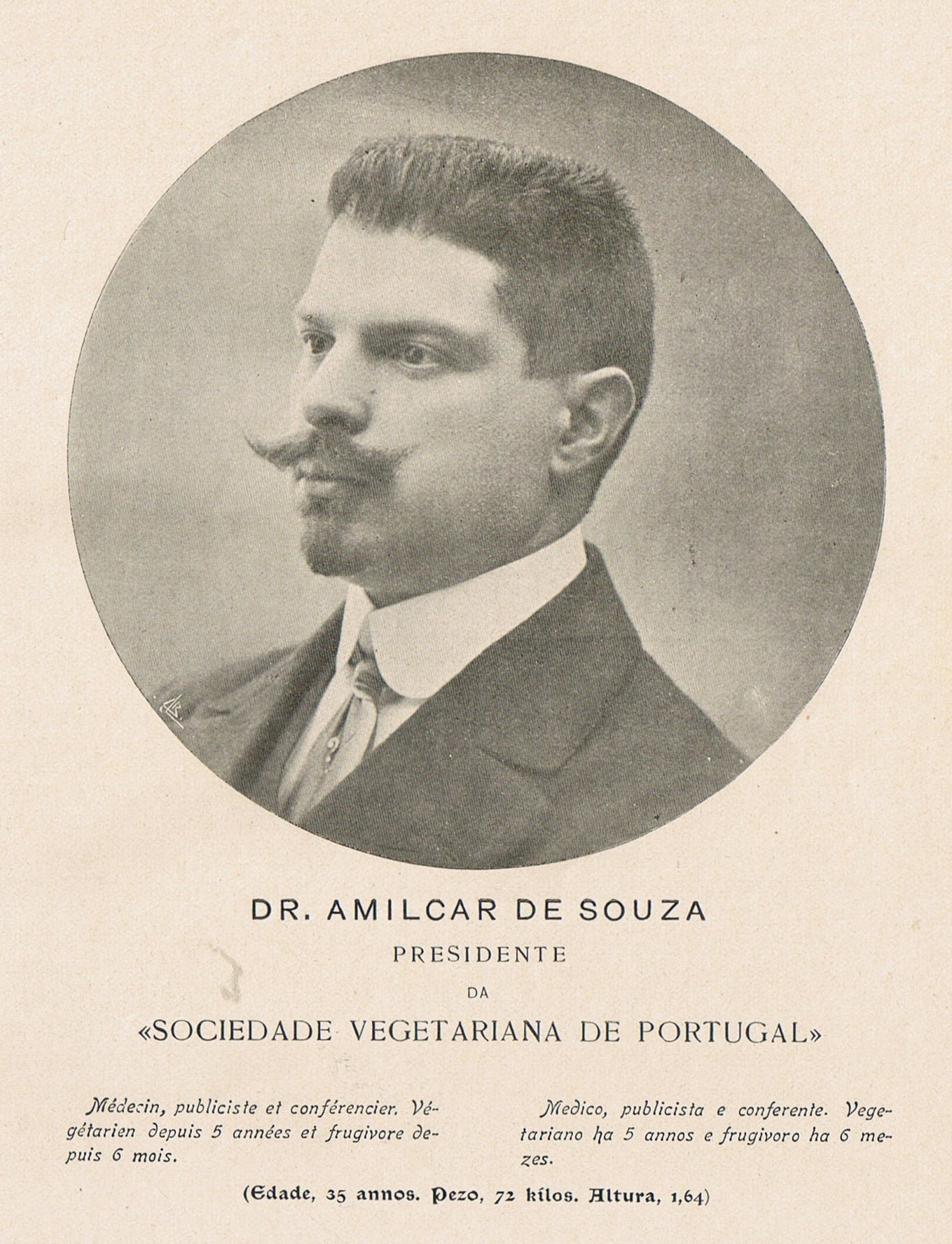
Amílcar de Sousa, Portuguese physician, president of the first Portuguese vegetarian society

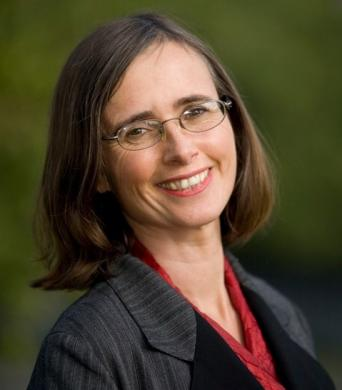
Mojo Mathers, New Zealand politician

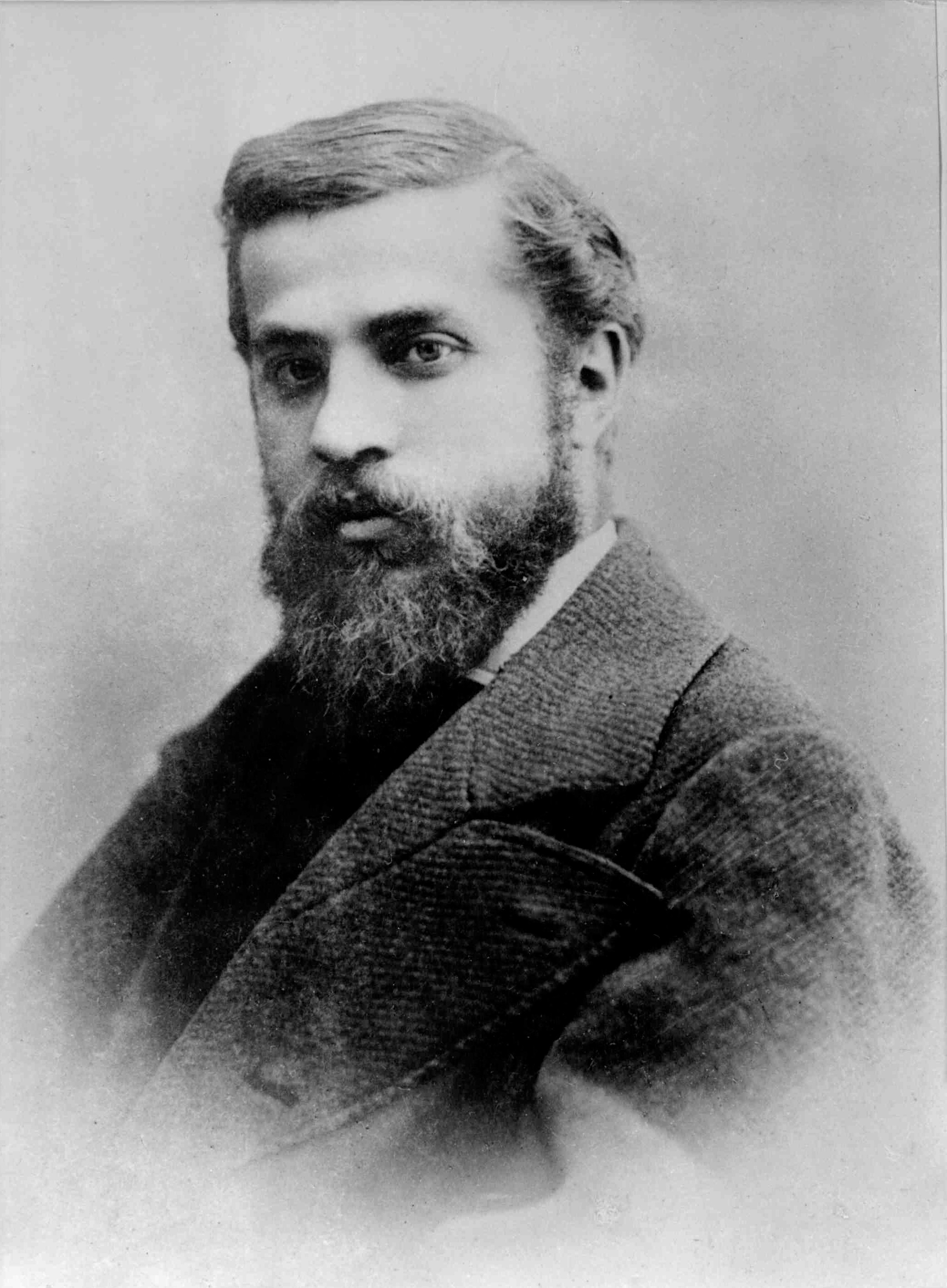
Antoni Gaudí, Spanish Catalan architect

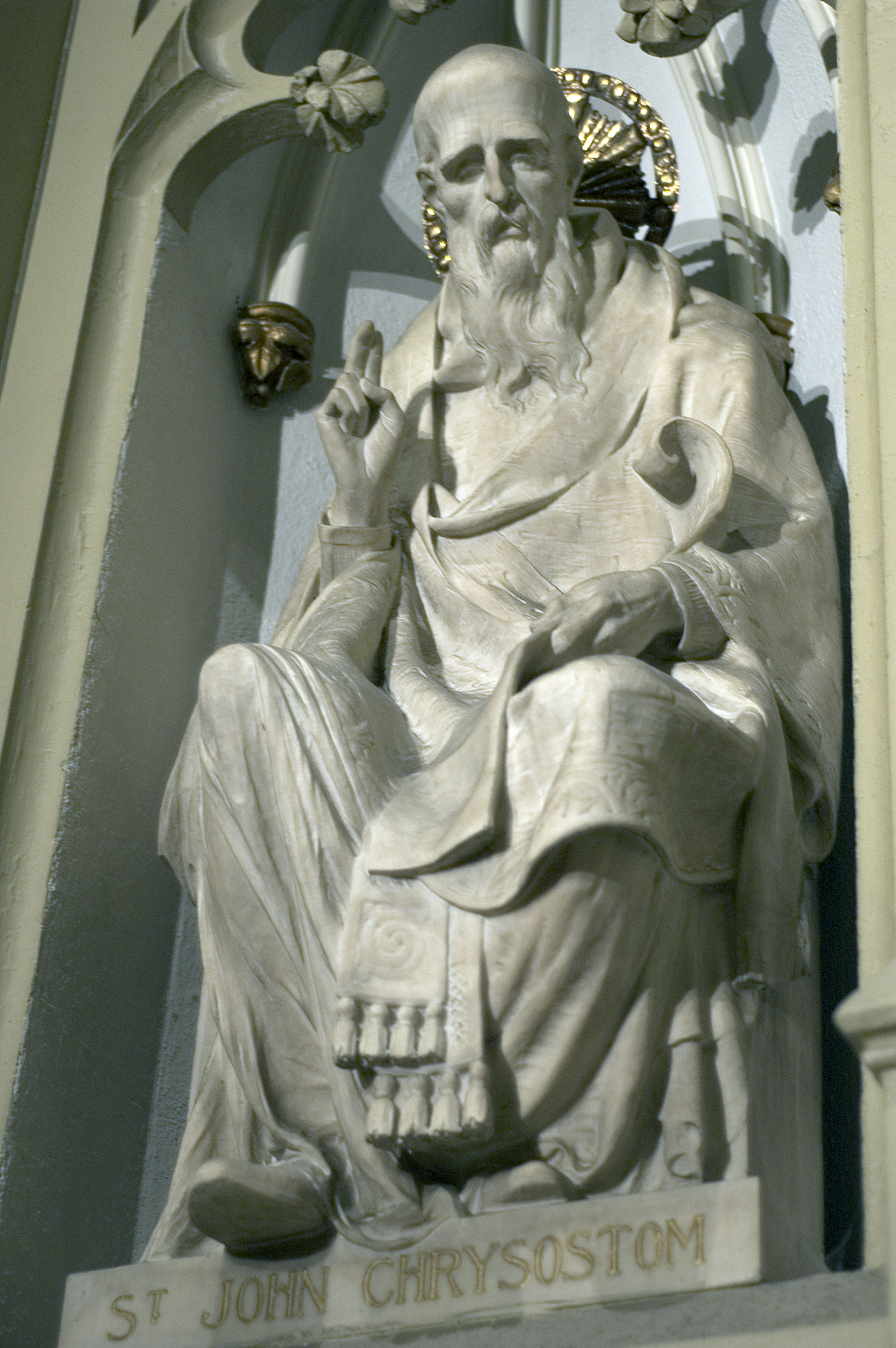
John Chrysostom, Archbishop of Constantinople, an important Early Church Father

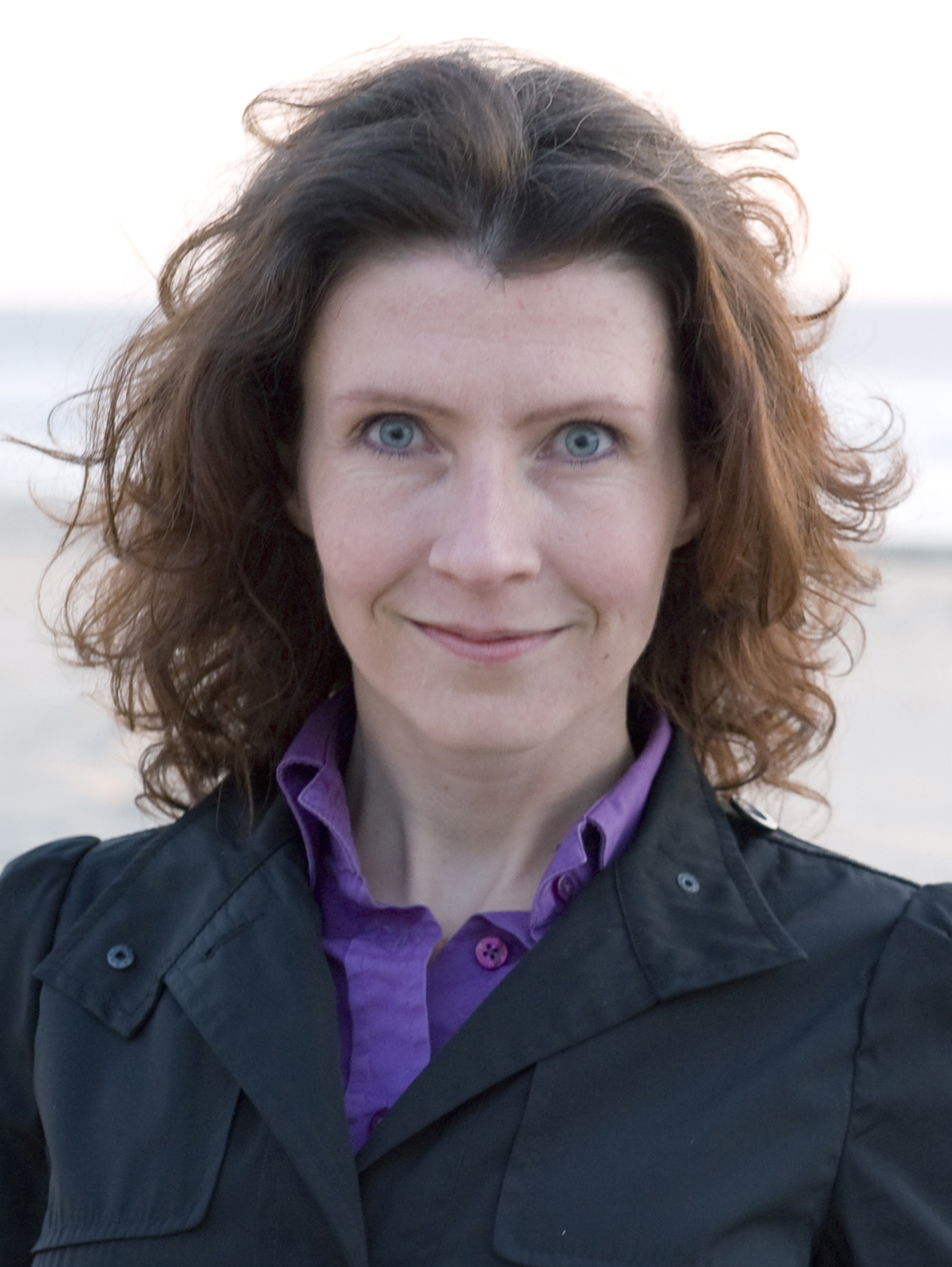
Esther Ouwehand, Dutch politician

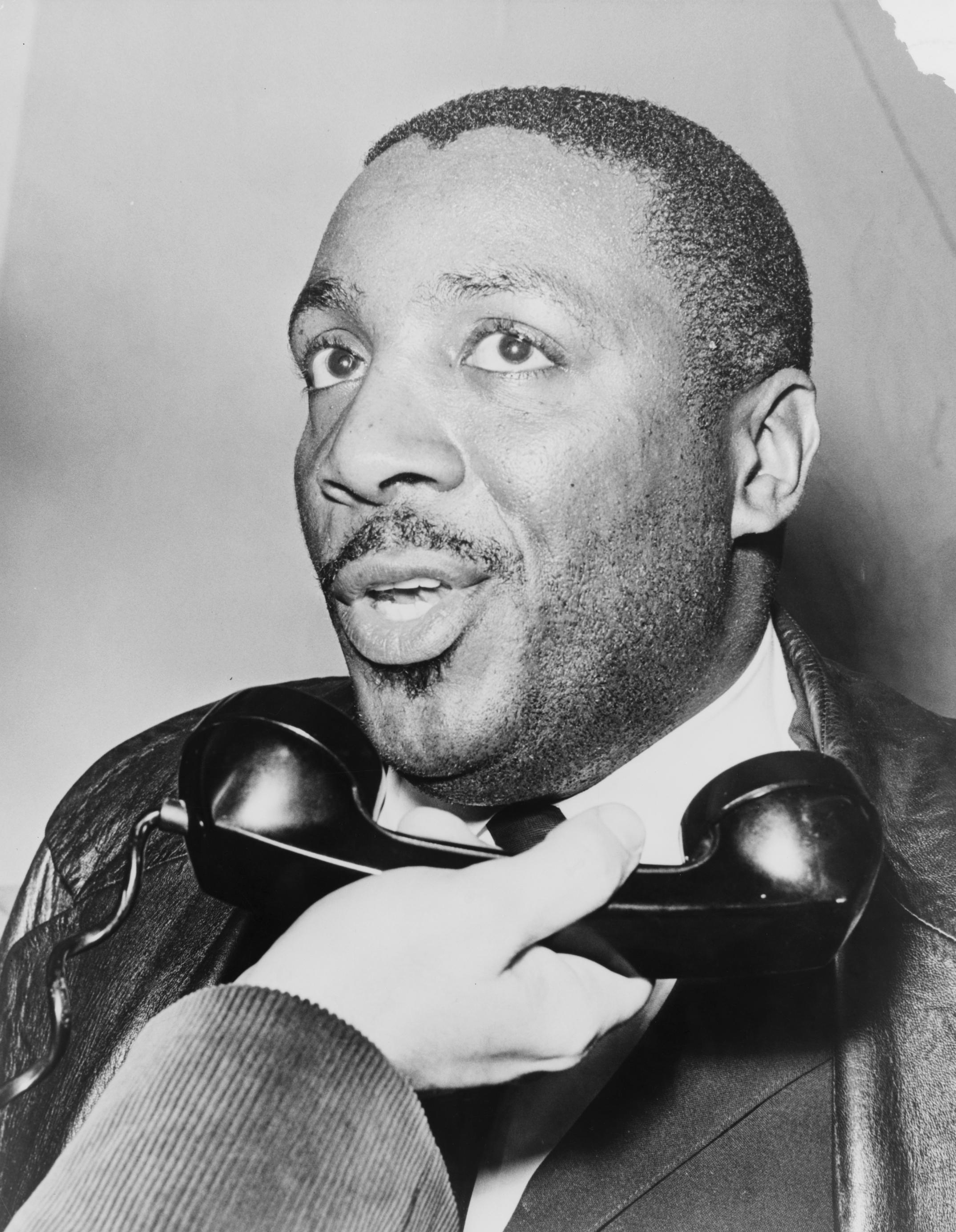
Dick Gregory, American comedian

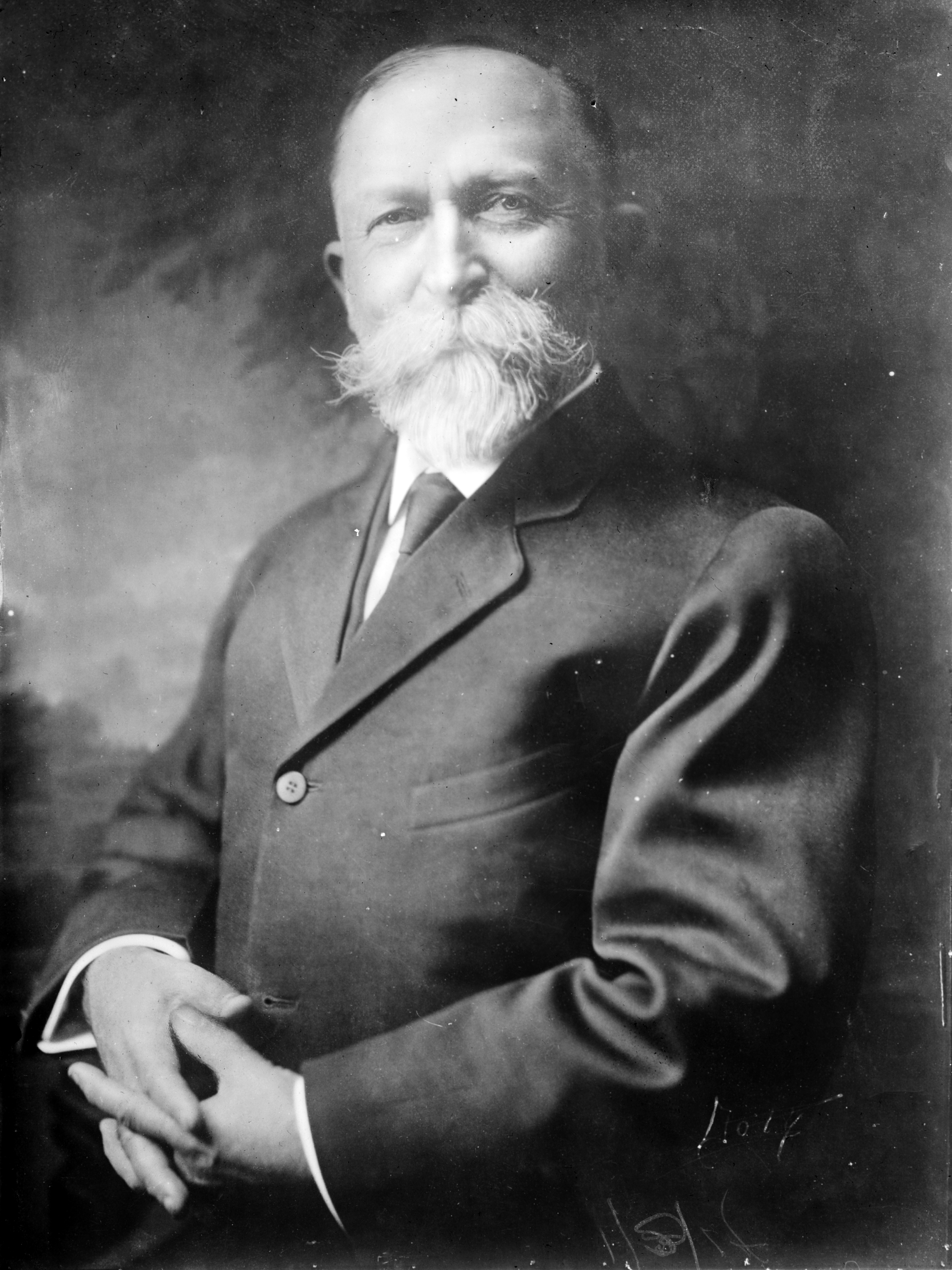
John Harvey Kellogg, American doctor, best known as the inventor of corn flakes

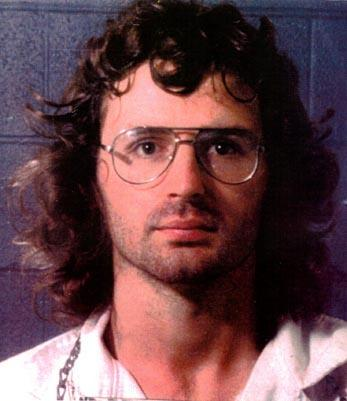
David Koresh, leader of the Branch Davidians

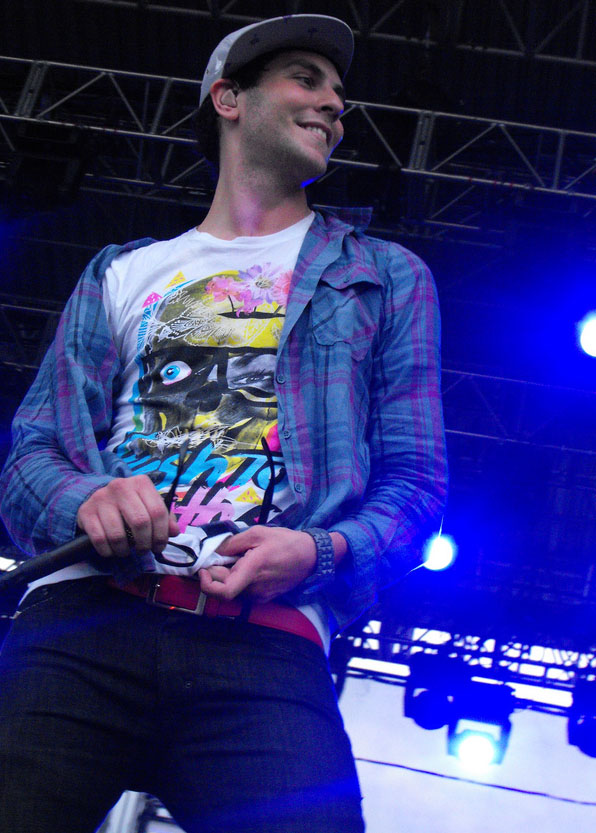
Gabe Saporta, Uruguayan musician, lead singer of the synthpop band Cobra Starship

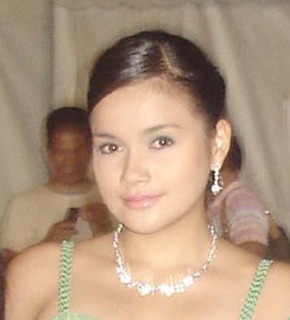
Yasmien Kurdi, Filipino singer, songwriter and actress

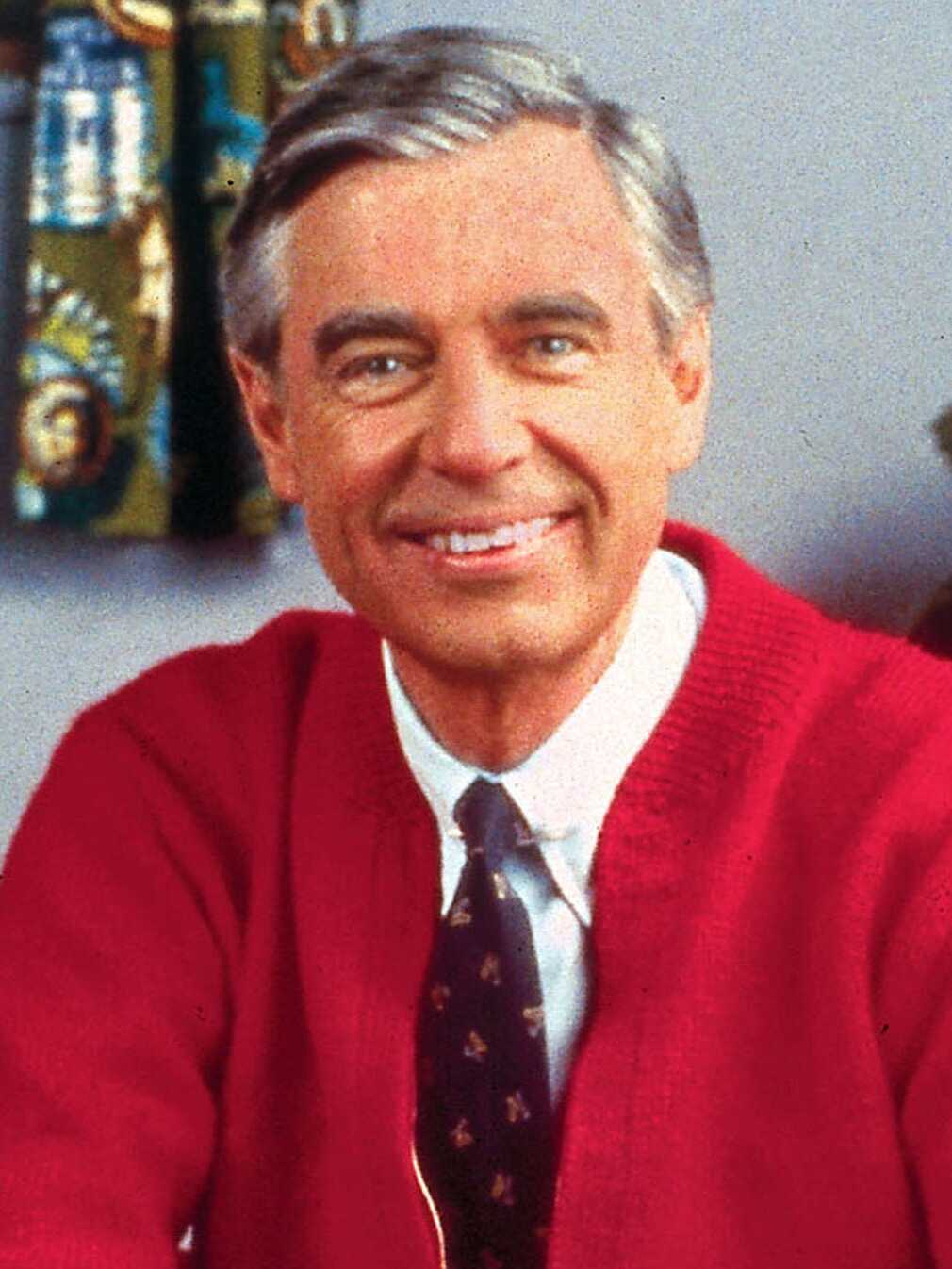
Fred Rogers, television personality and Presbyterian minister

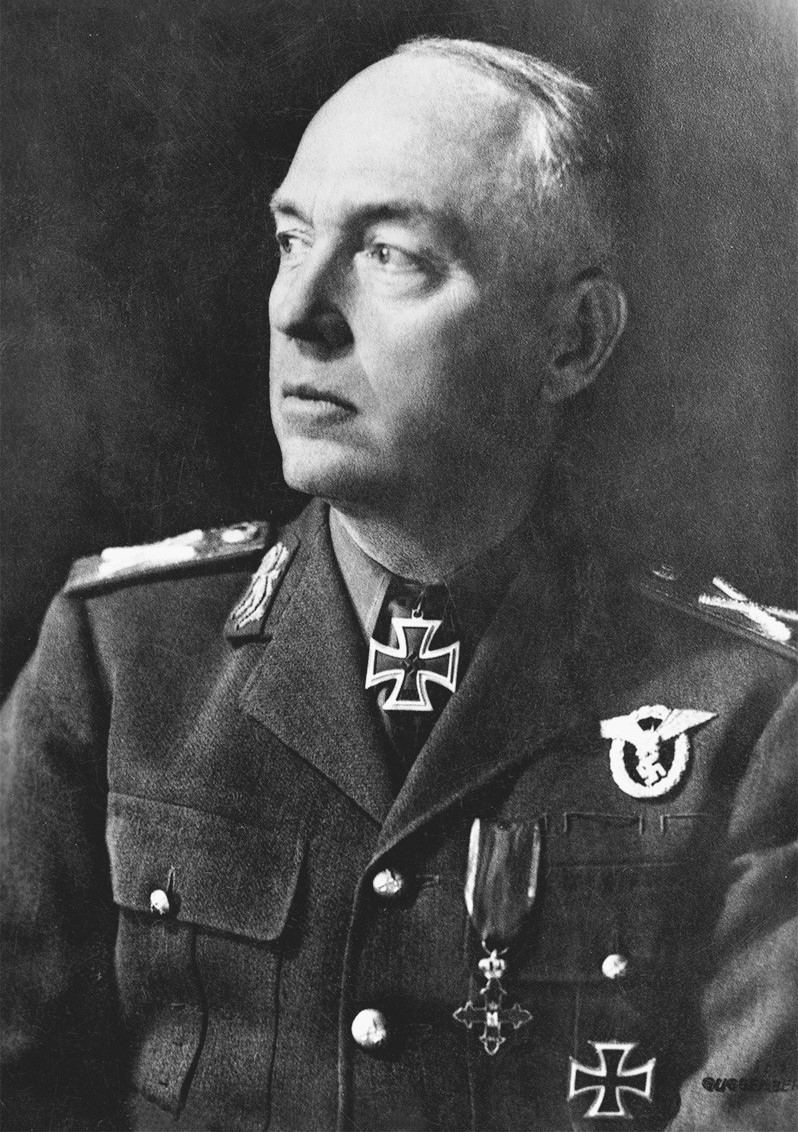
Ion Antonescu, Romanian politician

Name	Occupation	Country	Source
Chris Adler	Musician, drummer of Lamb of God	United States	
Agathocles	Political grindcore musical band	Belgium	
Shmuel Yosef Agnon	Writer	Israel	
Dianna Agron	Actress	United States	
Eden Ahbez	Musician	United States	
William Andrus Alcott	Physician	United States	
Sam Altman	Entrepreneur	United States	
Michael Amott	Musician	Sweden	
And Then There Were None	Rock band	United States	
Johan Angergård	Musician, owner of Labrador Records	Sweden	
Lauren Anderson	Model	United States	
Rhoda Ansty	Suffragist and teacher	United Kingdom	
Anthony the Great	Christian saint	Egypt	(Note: "He ate once a day, after sunset, sometimes once in two days, and often even in four. His food was bread and salt, his drink, water only. Of flesh and wine it is superfluous even to speak, since no such thing was found with the other earnest men.")
Ion Antonescu	Military officer, politician	Romania	
Álex Anwandter	Musician, director	Chile	
Apollonius of Tyana	Philosopher	Greece	
Christina Applegate	Actress	United States	
Johnny Appleseed	Nurseryman	United States	
Joan Armatrading	Musician	United Kingdom	
Ólafur Arnalds	Musician	Iceland	
Ashoka the Great	Emperor	India	
Emilie Autumn	Singer-songwriter, poet, violinist, actress	United States	
Thaila Ayala	Actress	Brazil	
Amitabh Bachchan	Actor	India	
Vidya Balan	Actress	India	
Nic Balthazar	Film director	Belgium	
Jacob Bannon	Musician, member of Converge	United States	
John Banville	Writer	Ireland	
Arnaldo Baptista	Musician	Brazil	
Bob Barker	Game show host	United States	
Samantha Barks	Actress, singer	Isle of Man	
Brandon Barnes	Musician, drummer of Rise Against	United States	
Basil of Caesarea	Bishop	Turkey	
Rabia Basri	Mystic	Iraq	
Joseph Bates	Co-founder of Seventh-day Adventist Church	United States	
Franco Battiato	Singer-songwriter, composer, filmmaker	Italy	
Beatle Bob	Dancer, St. Louis local figure	United States	
Jeff Beck	Musician	United Kingdom	
Nick Beggs	Musician	United Kingdom	
Conrad Beissel	Religious leader	Germany	
Raja Bell	Sportsman	United States	
Brie Bella	Professional wrestler, actress, WWE Ambassador	United States	
Jo Bench	Bassist	United Kingdom	
Anthony Benezet	Abolitionist and educator	United States	
Tony Benn	Politician	United Kingdom	
Hilary Benn	Politician	United Kingdom	
J. D. Beresford	Novelist	United Kingdom	
Elizabeth Berkley	Actress	United States	
Annie Besant	Writer	United Kingdom	
Traci Bingham	Actress	United States	
Maximilian Bircher-Benner	Physician	Switzerland	
John Bishop	Comedian	United Kingdom	
Barry Black	Clergyman	United States	
Pippa Black	Actress	Australia	
Tony Blackburn	Disc jockey	United Kingdom	
Zach Blair	Musician, guitarist of Rise Against	United States	
Alexa Bliss	Professional wrestler	United States	
Jeffrey Block	Buddhist monk and translator	United States	
Reginald Horace Blyth	Author	United Kingdom	
Kees Boeke	Missionary	Netherlands	
Beau Bokan	Musician and singer, frontman of Blessthefall	United States	
Marc Bolan	Musician	United Kingdom	
Michael Bolton	Musician	United States	
Surya Bonaly	Skater	France	
Bramwell Booth	Chief of the Staff and General of The Salvation Army	United Kingdom	
William Booth	Preacher, Founder of The Salvation Army	United Kingdom	
Nathaniel Borenstein	Computer scientist	United States	
Magnus Børmark	Musician	Norway	
Wouter Bos	Politician	Netherlands	(Note: (Original Dutch) V: "Wie is die man die 's zondags het vlees snijdt?" A: "De tofoe snijdt, want ik ben vegetariër." (Translation into English) Q: "Who is that man preparing the meat on Sunday?" A: "Preparing the tofu, because I am a vegetarian.")
Viktor Bout	Arms dealer, entrepreneur	Russia	
Josh Bradford	Guitarist for Silverstein	Canada	
Constantin Brâncuși	Sculptor, painter and photographer, pioneer of modernism	Romania	
Gyles Brandreth	Writer and politician	United Kingdom	
Justin Lee Brannan	Artist, community activist, organizer	United States	
Claudia de Breij	Comedian	Netherlands	(Note: (Original Dutch) "Wat hebben Paul McCartney, Claudia de Breij, Erik Mouthaan en Pia Douwes met elkaar gemeen? [..] Ze zijn vegetariërs..." (Translation into English) "What do Paul McCartney, Claudia de Breij, Erik Mouthaan and Pia Douwes have in common? [..] They're vegetarians...")
Eva Briegel	Singer	Germany	
Christie Brinkley	Model, actress	United States	
Peter Brock	Motor racing driver	Australia	
Fenner Brockway	Politician	United Kingdom	
Joseph Brotherton	Politician	United Kingdom	
Luitzen E.J. Brouwer	Mathematician	Netherlands	
Chris Browne	Cartoonist	United States	
Kathalijne Buitenweg	Politician	Netherlands	
Héctor Buitrago	Co-member of the Latin alternative band Aterciopelados	Colombia	
Bully	Rock band	United States	
Tahita Bulmer	Singer-songwriter for electronic band New Young Pony Club	United Kingdom	
George Burdi	Musician and white supremacist	Canada	
Peter Burwash	Tennis player	Canada	
Kate Bush	Musician	United Kingdom	
Lauren Bush	Model, designer	United States	
Hugo Calderano	Table tennis player	Brazil	
John Campbell	Bassist for Lamb of God	United States	
Nacho Cano	Arranger, composer, musician, record producer	Spain	
Julia Carling	Journalist	United Kingdom	
Belinda Carlisle	Singer	United States	
Edward Carpenter	Poet	United Kingdom	
Ben Carson	Neurosurgeon	United States	
Chris Carter	Musician	United Kingdom	
Paul Carton	Physician	France	
Cathy Cassidy	Author	United Kingdom	
Dan Castellaneta	Voice actor	United States	
Saint Catherine of Siena	Theologian	Italy	
Stephanie Cayo	Actress, singer, model	Peru	
Ceschi	Musician	United States	
Stephen Chan Chi Wan	Businessman	Hong Kong	
Agustina Cherri	Actress, dancer, model	Argentina	
Jacky Cheung	Singer	Hong Kong	
Sri Chinmoy	Poet	India	
Julie Christie	Actress	United Kingdom	
Saint John Chrysostom	Early Church Father	Turkey	
Stephen R. L. Clark	Philosopher	United Kingdom	
Daniël de Clercq	Socialist	Netherlands	
Sue Coe	Artist	United Kingdom	
J. M. Coetzee	Writer	South Africa	
Rabbi David Cohen	Rabbi	Israel	
She'ar Yashuv Cohen	Rabbi	Israel	
Alice Coltrane	Musician	United States	
John Coltrane	Musician	United States	
Pat Condell	Writer	United Kingdom	(Note: "I became a vegetarian in 1976 while watching a deer being butchered.")
Consolidated	Radical activist music group	United States	
Jeremy Corbyn	Politician	United Kingdom	
Liam Cormier	Musician	United States	
Isabelle Cornish	Actress	Australia	
Hugo Brandt Corstius	Author	Netherlands	
Elvis Costello	Musician	United Kingdom	
Roger Crab	Haberdasher	United Kingdom	
Stafford Cripps	Politician	United Kingdom	
Ernest Howard Crosby	Writer	United States	
Attila Csihar	Extreme metal musician	Hungary	
Alfonso Cuarón	Film director	Mexico	
Rivers Cuomo	Musician	United States	
Peter Cushing	Actor	United Kingdom	
Leonardo da Vinci	Polymath	Republic of Florence	
Eugen d'Albert	Musician	Germany	(Note: "It may be of interest to note, in view of his exuberant vigor and great powers of endurance, that d'Albert is a strict vegetarian")
John Darnielle	Musician, novelist	United States	
Georg Friedrich Daumer	Poet	Germany	
Dave Davies	Musician	United Kingdom	
Ray Davies	Musician	United Kingdom	
Zsombor Deak	Triathlete	Romania	
John Dear	Catholic priest, Christian pacifist, vegetarianism advocate	United States	
Brad Delp	Singer-songwriter, frontman of Boston and RTZ	United States	
Eugenio Derbez	Television actor, director	Mexico	
Morarji Desai	4th Prime Minister of India	India	
Floortje Dessing	Presenter	Netherlands	
Torrey DeVitto	Actress, musician, former fashion model	United States	
Thomas Di Leva	Singer-songwriter	Sweden	
Julieta Díaz	Actress	Argentina	
Dave Dictor	Musician	United States	
Mike Dirnt	Musician	United States	
Donovan	Musician	United Kingdom	
Eliza Doolittle	Musician	United Kingdom	
David D'Or	Musician	Israel	
Julien Doré	Singer-songwriter, musician, actor	France	
Desmond Doss	Combat medic, Medal of Honor recipient	United States	
Pia Douwes	Actress	Netherlands	
Hugh Dowding	Officer in the Royal Air Force	United Kingdom	
Muriel Dowding, Baroness Dowding	Animal rights activist	United Kingdom	
Anna Drijver	Model	Netherlands	
Isadora Duncan	Dancer	United States	
Michael Clarke Duncan	Actor	United States	
Frederik van Eeden	Writer	Netherlands	
Greg Egan	Writer	Australia	
Michael Eisner	Businessman	United States	
Mattias Eklundh	Musician	Sweden	
Emmanuel	Singer	Mexico	
Emmylou Harris	Musician	United States	
Empedocles of Acragas	Ancient Greek philosopher	Greece	
Guy Endore	Writer	United States	
Selma Ergeç	Actress	Turkey	
En Esch	Musician	Germany	
Joshua Evans	Quaker minister	United States	
Henri W.PH.E. van den Bergh van Eysinga	Writer	Netherlands	
Brian Fair	Vocalist for metal band Shadows Fall	United States	
Cosey Fanni Tutti	Performance artist, musician, writer	United Kingdom	
Corey Feldman	Actor	United States	
Marty Feldman	Comedian	United Kingdom	
Adam Ferguson	Philosopher	United Kingdom	
Vanessa Ferlito	Actress	United States	
Marsilio Ficino	Philosopher	Italy	
Doug Fieger	Musician	United States	
Thomas Gabriel Fischer	Metal musician who led the groups Hellhammer, Celtic Frost and Triptykon	Switzerland	
Harley Flanagan	Founding member and former bassist of the crossover thrash band Cro-Mags.	United States	
Alba Flores	Actress	Spain	
Flux of Pink Indians	Anarcho-punk/post-punk band	United Kingdom	
Jerome Flynn	Actor	United Kingdom	
Jonathan Safran Foer	Writer	United States	
Alina Foley	Actress	United States	
Alan Ford	Actor	United Kingdom	
Desmond Ford	Evangelical Christian	Australia	
Thomas Ignatius Maria Forster	Astronomer	United Kingdom	
J. D. Fortune	Musician	Canada	
Jorja Fox	Actress	United States	
Sage Francis	Rapper	United States	
Saint Francis of Paola	Mendicant friar	Italy	
Nat Friedman	Programmer	United States	
Liv Lisa Fries	Actress	Germany	
Edgar Froese	German artist and electronic music pioneer, best known for founding the electronic music group Tangerine Dream	Germany	
Sadie Frost	Actress	United Kingdom	
John Galliano	Fashion designer	United Kingdom	
Mahatma Gandhi	Leader of the Indian independence movement	India	
Gao Yuanyuan	Actress	China	
Jerry Garcia	Singer-songwriter and guitarist	United States	
Germán Garmendia	YouTuber	Chile	
Nicky Garratt	Musician, chef	United Kingdom	
Antoni Gaudí	Architect	Spain	
John Gay	Poet and dramatist	United Kingdom	
Teri Gender Bender	Musician	United States	
Geoffrey Giuliano	Actor	United States	
Philip Glass	Composer	United States	
Kevin Godley	Musician	United Kingdom	
Daniel Goldhagen	Author, professor, political scientist	United States	
Bobcat Goldthwait	Comedian	United States	
Lewis Gompertz	Animal rights advocate	United Kingdom	
Jorge González	Musician, former leader of the band Los Prisioneros	Chile	
João Gordo	Singer-songwriter	Brazil	
Shlomo Goren	Rabbi	Israel	
Lawrence Gowan	Musician	Canada	
Mckenna Grace	Actress	United States	
Sylvester Graham	Dietary reformer	United States	
Percy Grainger	Musician	Australia	
Dion Graus	Politician	Netherlands	
Derrick Green	Extreme metal vocalist for Sepultura	United States	
Eva Green	Actress	France	
Gail Greenwood	Musician	United States	
Dick Gregory	Comedian	United States	
Amanda Griffin	Model	Philippines	
Angela Groothuizen	Singer	Netherlands	
Benjamin Grosvenor	Musician	United Kingdom	
Vida Guerra	Glamour model	Cuba	
Nacha Guevara	Singer-songwriter, dancer and actress	Argentina	
Ramachandra Guha	Historian	India	
Chin Chin Gutierrez	Actress	Philippines	
GZA	Rapper	United States	
Ha Okio	Musician	Vietnam	
Alexander Hacke	Musician	Germany	
Nina Hagen	Singer and actress	Germany	
Alexander Haig	Physician	United Kingdom	
J. B. S. Haldane	Scientist	United Kingdom	
Alan Halsall	Actor	United Kingdom	
Otoman Zar-Adusht Ha'nish	Spiritual leader	United States	
Hao Lei	Actress	China	
Neil Harbisson	Cyborg	Spain	
John Harris	Journalist	United Kingdom	
George Harrison	Musician	United Kingdom	
Lenie 't Hart	Animal rights activist	Netherlands	
Maarten 't Hart	Biologist	Netherlands	(Note: (Original Dutch) "Presentator Babs Assink vraagt vegetariër en dierenvriend 't Hart of het een angstaanjagend beeld is dat wij het varken tot op het bot verslinden." (Translation into English) "Presenter Babs Assink asks vegetarian and animal friend 't Hart whether or not it is a frightening image that we devour our pigs to the bone.")
David Hartley	Philosopher	United Kingdom	(Note: "If the FRS knew Hartley as a friend, he would know him to be a mathematician with a special interest in statistics, an amateur violinist, and a vegetarian who saw animals as bearing a 'near relation' to humans.")
Thom Hartmann	Radio personality, author	United States	
Annie Haslam	Musician	United Kingdom	
Juliana Hatfield	Musician	United States	
Lizzy Hawker	Long-distance runner	United Kingdom	
Samantha Hayes	News presenter	New Zealand	
Heaven Shall Burn	Extreme metal band	Germany	
Sadegh Hedayat	Writer	Iran	
Martin van Hees	Philosopher	Netherlands	
Anne-Marie Helder	Singer-songwriter	United Kingdom	
Maximiliano Hernández Martínez	Politician	El Salvador	
Rudolf Hess	Politician	Germany	
Missy Higgins	Singer-songwriter	Australia	
Saint Hilarion	Anchorite	Egypt	
Arnold Hills	Businessman	United Kingdom	
Susumu Hirasawa	Musician	Japan	
Adolf Hitler	Politician	Austria	(Note: Traudl Junge, who became Hitler's secretary in December 1942, wrote in her memoirs that he ate only side dishes, always avoiding meat. Likewise, Margot Wölk, who was forced to work as one of Hitler's food tasters at the Wolf's Lair (1941–1944), stated that all the food she tested for Hitler was vegetarian, and she recalled no meat or fish. Léon Degrelle, an acquaintance of Hitler, also recalled "He could not bear to eat meat, because it meant the death of a living creature. He refused to have so much as a rabbit or a trout sacrificed to provide his food. He would allow only eggs on his table, because egg-laying meant that the hen had been spared rather than killed." See also: the Vegetarianism of Adolf Hitler. In 2017 Russia's Federal Security Service granted permission to a team of French scientists to undertake an examination of Hitler's bones. An analysis of the tartar deposits found on the Führer's teeth and dentures found no traces of meat fibre.)
Isa Hoes	Actress	Netherlands	
Lancelot Hogben	Zoologist	United Kingdom	
Jens Holm	Politician	Sweden	
Tuomas Holopainen	Keyboardist, songwriter	Finland	
Henriette Roland Holst	Poet	Netherlands	
Hostage Calm	Punk rock band	United States	
John Howard	Prison reformer	United Kingdom	
Steve Howe	Musician, guitarist for progressive rock band Yes	United Kingdom	
Mike Hranica	Singer for metalcore band The Devil Wears Prada	United States	
Dave Hughes	Television presenter	Australia	
Richard Hughes	Drummer	United Kingdom	
Henny Huisman	Television presenter	Netherlands	
Aldous Huxley	Writer	United Kingdom	
Chrissie Hynde	Musician, songwriter	United States	
Iamblichus	Philosopher	Syria	
Vanilla Ice	Rapper and actor	United States	
Eric Idle	Comedian, musician, writer	United Kingdom	
Frank Iero	Musician	United States	
Steve Ignorant	Singer and artist, co-founder of the anarcho-punk band Crass	United Kingdom	
Michael Imperioli	Actor	United States	
Ewout Irrgang	Politician	Netherlands	
La Toya Jackson	Singer	United States	
Susan Saint James	Actress	United States	
Jaiden Animations	YouTuber, animator	United States	
Reid Jamieson	Singer-songwriter	Canada	
Jim Jarmusch	Film director	United States	
JeA	Singer	South Korea	
Mick Jenkins	Rapper	United States	
Joan Jett	Singer-songwriter	United States	
Kanak Jha	Table tennis player	United States	
Éder Jofre	Boxer	Brazil	
Adelaide Johnson	Sculptor, suffragist, feminist	United States	
Matt Johnson	Vocalist and keyboardist of the indie pop duo Matt and Kim	United States	
Christofer Johnsson	Musician, founder member of Therion	Sweden	
James Johnston	Politician	United Kingdom	
Howard Jones	Musician	United Kingdom	
Watkin Tudor Jones	Musician	South Africa	
Jónsi	Musician, founder of post-rock band Sigur Rós	Iceland	
Sachiin J. Joshi	Actor, producer	India	
Mike Joyce	Drummer	United Kingdom	
Juanes	Singer-songwriter	Colombia	
Kabīr	Poet	India	
Alter Kacyzne	Photo-journalist	Lithuania	
Franz Kafka	Novelist	Austria-Hungary	
Shelly Kagan	Philosopher	United States	
A. P. J. Abdul Kalam	11th President of India	India	
Roberta Kalechofsky	Jewish writer, feminist, animal rights activist	United States	
Antonie Kamerling	Actor	Netherlands	
Shahid Kapoor	Actor	India	
Eliane Karp	Anthropologist, former First Lady of Peru	France	
Raden Adjeng Kartini	Educator, feminist	Indonesia	
Bill Kaulitz	Singer	Germany	
Kayah	Singer	Poland	
Sati Kazanova	Singer	Russia	
Diane Keaton	Actress	United States	
Annette Kellermann	Swimmer and actress	Australia	
John Harvey Kellogg	Physician	United States	
Matthew Kenney	Chef	United States	
Etgar Keret	Writer	Israel	
Kesha	Singer-songwriter	United States	
Irrfan Khan	Actor	India	
Ayya Khema	Bhikkhuni	Germany and United States	
Steve Kilbey	Singer-songwriter	Australia	
Masta Killa	Rapper	United States	
Kim Hyo-jin	Actress	South Korea	
Anna Bonus Kingsford	Magazine editor	United Kingdom	
Bep van Klaveren	Boxer	Netherlands	
Marcela Kloosterboer	Actress	Argentina	
Nicolette Kluijver	Television presenter and model	Netherlands	
Paul Koehler	Drummer of metalcore band Silverstein	Canada	
Niko Koffeman	Politician	Netherlands	(Note: (Original Dutch) "Zijn gedrevenheid moet, zeggen velen, voortkomen uit religieus besef: de vegetariër Koffeman is net als zijn vrouw belijdend Zevende-dagsadventist, een klein protestants kerkgenootschap."' (Translation into English) "His determination has to, some say, come from religieus belief: the vegetarian Koffeman is just like his wife a practising Seventh-day Adventist, a small protestant denomination.")
Hannes Kolehmainen	Long-distance runner	Finland	
Martine Wittop Koning	Writer	Netherlands	
Abraham Isaac Kook	Rabbi	Latvia	
Kim van Kooten	Actress and screenwriter	Netherlands	
David Koresh	Leader of Branch Davidians	United States	
k-os	Rapper	Canada	
Killer Kowalski	Professional wrestler	Canada	
Daniel H. Kress	Physician, follower of John Harvey Kellogg	Canada-United States	
Lauretta E. Kress	Physician, follower of John Harvey Kellogg	United States	
Jiddu Krishnamurti	Writer and public speaker	India	
Liv Kristine	Singer-songwriter	Norway	
KRS-One	Rapper	United States	
Alexander Krull	Singer	Germany	
Attje Kuiken	Politician	Netherlands	
Sushil Kumar	Wrestler	India	
František Kupka	Artist	Czechoslovakia	(Note: [1892] "Under Diefenbachs theosophical influence Kupka becomes a strict vegetarian and adopts a regime of daily physical exercises".) (Note: [1894] "Meets Nazarene artist Karl Diefenbach, who advocates man's return to naure. Moves to Diefenbach's home and participates in communal life-style there, which features vegetarian cuisine, outdoor baths, nude exercising, discussions about spiritual issues, music, and painting.")
Yasmien Kurdi	Singer	Philippines	
Haldor Lægreid	Singer	Norway	
Shaul Ladany	Racewalker	Israel	
Christine Lagarde	managing director of the International Monetary Fund	France	
Alphonse de Lamartine	Writer, poet and politician	France	(Note: "True it is that Lamartine ate flesh and fish at one period of his life; but we have the authority of Douglas Jerrold's London Journal for assuring our readers that he is again a vegetarian.") (Note: "Lamartine said that, despite his conventions, in adulthood he conformed to society by eating meat. But contemporaries recall that later in life Lamartine reconverted to vegetarianism after travelling through India, and lived in Paris like a Hindu vegetarian...")
Carla Lane	Television writer	United Kingdom	
Robert Lange	Record producer and songwriter	South Africa	
Frances Moore Lappé	Researcher and writer	United States	
Lauren Laverne	Radio DJ, television presenter and musician	United Kingdom	
Maricel Laxa	Comedian and actress	Philippines	
Benjamin Lay	Abolitionist	United States	
Cloris Leachman	Actress	United States	
Charles Webster Leadbeater	Author	United Kingdom	
Rita Lee	Singer-songwriter	Brazil	
Patricia de León	Actress, TV host, model, beauty pageant titleholder	Panama	
Nikolai Leskov	Writer	Russia	
Chris Leslie	Electric folk musician, member of Fairport Convention	United Kingdom	
Katie Leung	Actress	United Kingdom	
Leona Lewis	Singer	United Kingdom	
Tony Levin	Musician	United States	
Liang Shuming	Philosopher, teacher, and leader in the Rural Reconstruction Movement	China	
Jimmy Liao	Picture book illustrator	Taiwan	
Bart de Ligt	Anarcho-pacifist and antimilitarist	Netherlands	
Jan Ligthart	Teacher	Netherlands	
Jack Lindsay	Writer	Australia	
Richard Linklater	Film director	United States	
Lucy Liu	Actress	United States	
Tzipi Livni	Politician	Israel	
Eneko Llanos	Athlete	Spain	
Lo Wing-lok	Physician and politician	Hong Kong	
Michael Locher	Musician	Switzerland	
Claire Loewenfeld	Nutritionist and herbalist	Germany	
César López	Musician	Mexico	
Patricia López	Actress	Chile	
Kiko Loureiro	Musician, Guitarist	Brazil	
Lu You	Poet	China	
Arjen Lucassen	Singer-songwriter	Netherlands	
Joanna Lumley	Actress	United Kingdom	
Anni-Frid Lyngstad	Singer	Norway	
Lady Constance Lytton	Suffragette	United Kingdom	
M-1	Rapper, member of Dead Prez	United States	
Grant MacEwan	Professor and politician	Canada	
Francisco Madero	Politician, writer and revolutionary	Mexico	
R. Madhavan	Actor, writer, producer, television presenter	India	
Jamby Madrigal	Politician	Philippines	
Jaime de Magalhães Lima	Philosopher, poet and writer	Portugal	(Note: Jaime de Magalhães Lima (1859–1936) was a Portuguese writer born in Aveiro. He studied Law in the University of Coimbra. He was an admirer of Tolstoy and visited him in Russia. In 1912 he wrote the essay O Vegetarismo e a Moralidade das raças.)
Mahavira	Sage who established tenets of Jainism	India	
Gustav Mahler	Composer and one of the leading conductors of his generation	Austria-Hungary	(Note: "The following season proved a very gloomy one for Mahler. Once more the "city of music" could furnish him no greater material consolation than that of a few piano-pupils. Evenings he would attach himself to a group of young, poverty-stricken Wagnerian enthusiasts and over a cup of coffee help wage the abstract battles of the music-dramatist's political and ethical doctrines. Of these sage utterances one the young musicians adopted unanimously was the proposal to regenerate mankind through strict, vegetarian diet. Perhaps the cost of meat-dishes had as much to do with this resolution as the realization that carnivorous humanity was going to the dogs. [...] Although two years had passed since those unforgettable meatless meetings of the young Wagnerians in Vienna, Mahler was in Olmuetz still a vegetarian, claiming bitterly that he went to the restaurant to starve.") (Note: "Keussler is also already here. A splendid fellow. After the Saturday evening rehearsal I'll be joining him for a vegetarian meal. (10 September 1908)"; "I'll presumably have to assume the role of 'the flesh pots in the land of Egypt'. Ouch! What a metaphor for a husband with vegetarian inclinations! (June 1909).")
Lucy A. Mallory	Writer, publisher, editor, and spiritualist	United States	
Andrius Mamontovas	Musician, songwriter, record producer, actor	Lithuania	
Mani	Founder of Manichaeism	Iran	
João Manzarra	Television host	Portugal	
Jodie Marsh	Media personality, glamour model	United Kingdom	
Andy Martin	Musician and writer	United Kingdom	
Billy Martin	Guitarist and keyboardist for pop punk band Good Charlotte	United States	
Luis Miguel Martín	Long-distance runner	Spain	
Ricky Martin	Singer-songwriter, actor	Puerto Rico	
Mariano Gabriel Martínez	Musician and producer, founder of the band Attaque 77	Argentina	
Sebastián Martínez	Actor	Colombia	
Doug Martsch	Musician, member of Built to Spill	United States	
Scott Maslen	Actor, model	United Kingdom	
Paul Masvidal	Musician, member of progressive metal band Cynic	United States	
Mojo Mathers	Politician, member of the New Zealand House of Representatives	New Zealand	
Andre Matos	Musician	Brazil	
Trixie Mattel	Drag queen, singer-songwriter, comedian	United States	
Alicia Mayer	Actress, comedian	Philippines	
Mazdak	Founder of Mazdakism	Iran	
Paul Mazurkiewicz	Drummer for death metal band Cannibal Corpse	United States	
Winston McCall	Musician	Australia	
Colman McCarthy	Journalist, teacher, lecturer, peace activist	United States	
Linda McCartney	Photographer, musician, entrepreneur	United States	
Paul McCartney	Musician, composer, producer, businessman, member of The Beatles	United Kingdom	
Stella McCartney	Fashion designer	United Kingdom	
Rue McClanahan	Actress, comedian, author	United States	
Patrick McDonnell	Illustrator, creator of Mutts	United States	
James McDowall	Politician, member of the New Zealand House of Representatives	New Zealand	
Jay McGuiness	Singer, member of the boy band The Wanted	United Kingdom	
Tim McIlrath	Musician, vocalist and guitarist of Rise Against	United States	
Gina McKee	Actress	United Kingdom	
Virginia McKenna	Actress, author and wildlife campaigner	United Kingdom	
Edward McMillan-Scott	Member of the European Parliament	United Kingdom	
Trash McSweeney	Musician, leader of the band The Red Paintings	Australia	
Hemant Mehta	Author, blogger, atheist activist	United States	
Armin Meiwes	Convict who claims to be reformed and concerned about injustices	Germany	
Shraga Feivel Mendlowitz	Rabbi, leader of American Orthodoxy	United States	
Natalie Merchant	Musician, songwriter	United States	
Method Man	Hip hop artist, record producer, actor, member of the Wu-Tang Clan	United States	
Chucho Merchán	Musician	Colombia	
Saint Angela de Merici	Religious leader and saint	Italy	
Johan Messchaert	Singer and vocal pedagogue	Netherlands	
Reinhard Mey	Singer-songwriter	Germany	
Eustace Miles	Real tennis player and health writer	United Kingdom	
Gabrielle Miller	Actress	Canada	
Crispian Mills	Musician, songwriter, film director	United Kingdom	
Hayley Mills	Actress, singer	United Kingdom	
Milo	Rapper	United States	
Giovanni Pico della Mirandola	Renaissance philosopher	Italy	
Narendra Modi	14th Prime Minister of India	India	
Elizabeth Maria Molteno	Suffragist and civil rights activist	South Africa	
Daniel Mongrain	Musician for metal bands Martyr and Voivod	Canada	
Théodore Monod	Naturalist, explorer, and humanist scholar	France	
Andrea Montenegro	Actress, model	Peru	
Leonardo Montero	TV host	Argentina	
Alan Moore	Comic book writer	United Kingdom	
J. Howard Moore	Zoologist, philosopher, educator and socialist	United States	
Jenna Morasca	Actor, swimsuit model, winner of Survivor: The Amazon	United States	
Tom Morello	Guitarist, singer, songwriter, former member of Rage Against the Machine	United States	
Edwin Moses	Former track and field athlete	United States	
Malcolm Muggeridge	Journalist, author, satirist	United Kingdom	
Bawa Muhaiyaddeen	Saintly Tamil-speaking teacher and Sufi mystic from the island of Sri Lanka	Sri Lanka	
Lillian Müller	Model, actress in motion pictures and television	Norway	
Desidério Murcho	Philosopher, professor, and writer	Portugal	(Note: 'O consumo de animais é supérfluo, não há razão para continuar a comê-los quando é tão fácil ser vegetariano', comentou Desidério Murcho, filósofo e vegetariano convicto ['The consumption of animals is unnecessary, there is no reason to continue to eat them when it is so easy to be vegetarian,' said Desiderio Murch, philosopher and vegetarian].)
Stuart Murdoch	Musician, member of indie pop band Belle & Sebastian	United Kingdom	
Keith Murray	Musician, member of indie rock band We Are Scientists	United States	
Murs	Rapper	United States	
Reuben D. Mussey	Medical doctor and an early opponent of tobacco	United States	
My Summer As A Salvation Soldier	Singer-songwriter	Iceland	
Adam Myerson	Cyclist	United States	
Xavier Naidoo	Singer-songwriter, record producer	Germany	
Andrew Napolitano	Senior Judicial Analyst for Fox News Channel, former host of Freedom Watch	United States	
Kevin Nealon	Actor and comedian	United States	
Helen Nearing	Author	United States	
Scott Nearing	Economist, educator, writer	United States	
Sharon Needles	Drag Queen, Singer	United States	
Elizabeth Neesom	19th-century Chartist and social reformer	United Kingdom	
Philip Neri	Priest noted for founding the "Congregation of the Oratory"	Italy	
Alexander Nesmeyanov	Chemist and president of the Academy of Sciences of the Soviet Union	USSR	
Mike Ness	Musician for punk rock band Social Distortion	United States	
Jukka Nevalainen	Musician, member of Nightwish	Finland	
Phil Neville	Footballer, played for Manchester United and Everton	United Kingdom	
George Nicholson	Nationally known printer	United Kingdom	
Ferdinand Domela Nieuwenhuis	The Netherlands' first prominent socialist	Netherlands	
Nityalila	Singer-songwriter	Philippines	
Roberto de Nobili	Jesuit missionary to Southern India	Italy	
William F. Nolan	Novelist, short story writer	United States	
Krist Novoselic	Musician, songwriter, author, activist, Nirvana member	United States	
Laura Nyro	Songwriter, singer, pianist	United States	
Suresh Oberoi	Character actor	India	
Vivek Oberoi	Actor	India	
Billy Ocean	Singer-songwriter	United Kingdom	
Natasja Oerlemans	Politician, prominent member of the Party for the Animals	Netherlands	
José Oiticica	Poet, activist	Brazil	
Henry Oldham	Obstetric physician	United Kingdom	
Margreth Olin	Film director and producer	Norway	
Maria O'Neill	Writer, poet, journalist, spiritualist	Portugal	
Onision	YouTuber and Internet personality	United States	
Natalia Oreiro	Singer, actress, fashion designer	Uruguay	
Origen of Alexandria	Early Christian Neoplatonist philosopher and theologian and Church Father	Roman province of Egypt	
Dean Ornish	Physician and researcher	United States	
Kelly Osbourne	Singer-songwriter, author, actress, television personality, radio personality, fashion designer	United Kingdom	
Maja Ostaszewska	Actress	Poland	
Carré Otis	Actress, model	United States	
Esther Ouwehand	Politician, marketing manager	Netherlands	(Note: (Original Dutch) "De koeien waren moe en zwak, maar werden toch de vrachtwagens ingeschopt en geslagen. Toen heb ik besloten daar niet mee aan mee te werken en vegetariër te worden." (Translation into English) "The cows were tired and weak and were brutally thrown into the trucks. At that point I decided to become a vegetarian and stop supporting this.")
Cem Özdemir	Politician	Germany	
Monty Panesar	Cricketer	United Kingdom	
Rosa Parks	Civil Rights Activist	United States	
Alice Paul	Socialist, suffragist, feminist, and women's rights activist	United States	
Alexandra Paul	Actress	United States	
Gastón Pauls	Actor, TV host, producer	Argentina	
Nicolás Pauls	Actor, musician	Argentina	
Justin Pearson	Musician for a number of noise rock and hardcore bands, as The Locust	United States	
Kal Penn	Film and television actor, producer, and civil servant	United States	
Isaac Leib Peretz	Yiddish language author and playwright	Poland	
Tony Perry	Musician, member of Pierce the Veil	United States	
Fiona Phillips	Television broadcaster	United Kingdom	
Richard Phillips	Schoolteacher, author and publisher	United Kingdom	
Kellie Pickler	Singer-songwriter	United States	
Gary Pihl	Guitarist, member of the band Boston	United States	
Sarah M. Pike	Comparative religion scholar	United States	
Pitchshifter	Metal band	United Kingdom	
Plotinus	Ancient Greek Neoplatonist philosopher	Greece	(Note: "Plotinus came from somewhere in Egypt and lived a frugal life. He was celibate and vegetarian and took little in the way of food, drink and sleep.")
Plutarch	Biographer, essayist, priest, ambassador, magistrate	Greece	
Henri Polak	Trade unionist and politician	Netherlands	
Alexander Pope	Poet	United Kingdom	
John Porcelly	Musician	United States	
Porphyry	Ancient Greek Neoplatonist philosopher	Greece	
Martín de Porres	Lay brother of the Dominican Order	Peru	
John Cowper Powys	Novelist	United Kingdom	
A. C. Bhaktivedanta Swami Prabhupada	Gaudiya Vaishnava teacher, founder-acharya of the International Society for Krishna Consciousness	India	
Jade Puget	Musician, member of the alternative rock band AFI	United States	
Purified in Blood	Metalcore band	Norway	
Jimmy Pursey	Musician, record producer	United Kingdom	
Puyi	Emperor	China	
Pythagoras of Samos	Ionian Greek philosopher, religious teacher, political leader, and founder of Pythagoreanism	Greece	
Martha Quinn	One of the original video jockeys on MTV	United States	
Andrea Rabagliati	Author	United Kingdom	
Amit Rahav	Actor	Israel	
Shrimad Rajchandra	Jain poet and philosopher	India	
C. V. Raman	Physicist	India	
Srinivasa Ramanujan	Mathematician and autodidact	India	
Anna Ramírez Bauxel	Racing cyclist	Spain	
Murray Rankin	Politician	Canada	
P.V. Narasimha Rao	9th Prime Minister of India	India	
Guillaume Thomas François Raynal	Writer and man of letters during the Age of Enlightenment	France	(Note: "Outro autor muito afamado de nossos dias, Raynal, era igualmente sóbrio. A senhora Marquesa de Alorna, que muitas vezes o teve a jantar, me contou, que nunca o vira comer mais que algumas poucas ervas e fruta, nem beber senão água.")
Jean Jacques Élisée Reclus	Geographer, anarchist revolutionary, and writer	France	
Dame Patsy Reddy	Governor-General of New Zealand	New Zealand	
Redman	Rapper, record producer, actor	United States	
Dimitri Reinderman	Chess Grandmaster with an Elo rating of 2542	Netherlands	
Ilya Yefimovich Repin	Leading Russian painter and sculptor of the Peredvizhniki artistic school	Russia	
Rekha	Actress	India	
Reshma	Renowned folk singer of Pakistan	Pakistan	
Rou Reynolds	Lead vocalist of Enter Shikari	United Kingdom	
Saint Richard of Chichester	Saint who was Bishop of Chichester	United Kingdom	
Penny Rimbaud	Writer, poet, philosopher, co-founder of the punk band Crass	United Kingdom	
Joseph Ritson	Antiquary	United Kingdom	
Maura Rivera	Dancer, television performer	Chile	
Reuven Rivlin	10th President of Israel	Israel	
Andy Robinson	English rugby union coach and retired player	United Kingdom	
Zack de la Rocha	Rapper, songwriter, activist, singer of Rage Against the Machine	United States	
Carlos Rodríguez	Musician	Argentina	
José Luis Rodríguez	Singer	Venezuela	
Fred Rogers	Educator, minister, songwriter, television host	United States	
Romain Rolland	Dramatist, essayist, art historian, novelist	France	
Uli Jon Roth	Musician	Germany	
Xavier Rudd	Musician, singer-songwriter	Australia	
Hastings Russell, 12th Duke of Bedford	Nobility, activist	United Kingdom	
RZA	Rapper, CEO, record producer, actor, screenwriter, author, director	United States	
Jonathan Sacks	Rabbi, philosopher, and scholar of Judaism	United Kingdom	
Jacques-Henri Bernardin de Saint-Pierre	Writer, botanist	France	
Henry Stephens Salt	Writer, teacher, social reformer	United Kingdom	
Cesár Sampson	Singer	Austria	
Diederik Samsom	Politician	Netherlands	
Ric Sanders	Violinist, member of Fairport Convention	United Kingdom	
Justin Sane	Lead guitarist, singer and songwriter of the punk rock group Anti-Flag	United States	
Gabe Saporta	Lead singer and primary creative force behind the synthpop band Cobra Starship	Uruguay	
Susan Sarandon	Actress	United States	
Judith Sargentini	GreenLeft politician	Netherlands	
Martin Sastre	Artist, filmmaker	Uruguay	
Swami Satchidananda	Religious teacher, spiritual master and yoga adept	India	
Kool Savas	German rapper	Germany	
Sky Saxon	Musician	United States	
Nikolas Schiller	Blogger, prominent digital map artist in the blogosphere, civil rights activist	United States	
Wim T. Schippers	Voice actor, producer, comedian	Netherlands	
Fred Schneider	Musician, frontman of the rock band The B-52's	United States	
Tom Scholz	Musician, founder of the band Boston	United States	
Loretta Schrijver	Television host	Netherlands	(Note: (Original Dutch) "Of vlees-vrije stijlvolle godinnen als Marly van der Velden, Alyssa Milano, Isa Hoes, Jorinde Moll, Loretta Schrijver [..]" (Translation into English) "Or meat free stylish goddesses like Marly van der Velden, Alyssa Milano, Isa Hoes, Jorinde Moll, Loretta Schrijver [..]")
Richard H. Schwartz	Professor emeritus of mathematics, president of the Jewish Vegetarians of North America	United States	
Jason Schwartzman	Actor, musician	United States	
Albert Schweitzer	Music, philanthropist, theologian	Germany	
Jeremy Scott	Fashion designer	United States	
Jenny Seagrove	Actress, animal rights activist	United Kingdom	
Kevin Seconds	Singer for hardcore punk band 7 Seconds	United States	
Virender Sehwag	One of the leading batsmen in the Indian cricket team	India	
Sandra Seifert	Nurse, beauty pageant contestant, fashion model	Taiwan	
Captain Sensible	Musician	United Kingdom	
Serenity	Erotic dancer and pornographic actress	United States	
Christian Serratos	Actress	United States	
Quintus Sextius	Philosopher, whose philosophy combined Pythagoreanism with Stoicism	Italy	(Note: "Sextius thought, that there was food enough for man in the world without shedding blood; and that the taking pleasure in butchering helpless animals, only inspired men with cruelty.")
Otep Shamaya	Vocalist of nu metal band Otep	United States	
Anushka Sharma	Actress, producer	India	
George Bernard Shaw	Playwright, critic, political activist	Ireland	
Martin Shaw	Actor	United Kingdom	
Francis Sheehy-Skeffington	Pacifist, suffragist	Ireland	
Percy Bysshe Shelley	Poet, dramatist, essayist, novelist	United Kingdom	
Herbert Shelton	Alternative medicine advocate, author, pacifist	United States	
Sheetal Sheth	Actress, producer	United States	
Barbie Shu	Actress and singer	Taiwan	
Agostinho da Silva	Philosopher, essayist and writer	Portugal	
Sarah Silverman	Comedian, writer, actress, singer and musician	United States	
Robert B. Silvers	Editor	United States	
Aaron Simpson	Mixed martial artist	United States	
Isaac Bashevis Singer	Novelist, short story writer	United States	
Peter Singer	Moral philosopher	Australia	
Fauja Singh	Centenarian marathon runner	India	
Matt Skiba	Musician for Alkaline Trio and Blink-182	United States	
Jon Skolmen	Actor and comedian	Norway	
Jaden Smith	Actor, Musician	United States	
Frank Somerville	Journalist	United States	
Song Il-gook	Actor	South Korea	
Sonu Sood	Actor, model	India	
Matt Sorum	Musician	United States	
Patricia Sosa	Singer	Argentina	
Sotion	Neopythagorean philosopher	Greece	
Amílcar de Sousa	Medical doctor, author, president of the first Portuguese vegetarian society	Portugal	
Daniel Sperber	Rabbi and academic	Israel	
Henry Spira	Widely regarded as one of the most effective animal rights activists of the 20th century	United States	
Victoria Starmer	Solicitor	United Kingdom	
Freddie Starr	Comedian	United Kingdom	
Ringo Starr	Musician, singer-songwriter, actor, drummer for the Beatles	United Kingdom	
Bill Steer	Guitarist for extreme metal band Carcass	United Kingdom	
Aad Stelylen	Former Dutch athlete, specialised in long distances	Netherlands	
Arran Stephens	Writer, founder of Nature's Path Foods	Canada	
Jon Stewart	TV show host, comedian	United States	
Courtney Stodden	Reality show contestant, actress, model	United States	
Joss Stone	Singer-songwriter, actress	United Kingdom	
Jan P. Strijbos	Naturalist, cineast, photographer, journalist, writer	Netherlands	
Joe Strummer	Musician, vocalist and guitarist of punk rock band The Clash	United Kingdom	
Stu Strumwasser	Novelist and entrepreneur	United States	
Gustav Struve	Politician	Germany	
Poly Styrene	Singer-songwriter	United Kingdom	
Stza	Musician	United States	
María Eugenia Suárez	Actress, singer, model	Argentina	
Mark Suppelsa	Television anchor	United States	
David Sylvian	Singer-songwriter and musician, lead vocalist and main songwriter in the group Japan	United Kingdom	
Rabindranath Tagore	Poet, playwright, essayist	India	
Amber Tamblyn	Actress	United States	
Carlo Taranto	Member of the trio of TV and radio commentators Gialappa's Band	Italy	
Tarkan	Singer-songwriter, record producer, performer	Turkey	
Tertullian	Prolific early Berber Christian author from Carthage in the Roman province of Africa	Roman Empire (Carthage)	
Nikola Tesla	Inventor, engineer and futurist	Serbia	
Shashi Tharoor	Politician	India	
The Giving Tree Band	Rock band	United States	
Marianne Thieme	Politician, animal rights activist, author	Netherlands	(Note: (Original Dutch) "Of ik zelf ook vegetariër ben? [..] Zelf heb ik dat vlees echter niet meer nodig. Bovendien wil ik graag advocaat voor de dieren zijn en u snapt dat ik dan liever niet mijn eigenklanten opeet." (Translation into English) "Whether or not I am a vegetarian myself? [..] I do not to eat meat anymore. In fact, I want to defend the rights of animals (as a lawyer) and I guess you understand I would rather not eat my own clients")
Maarten Tjallingii	Professional racing cyclist for UCI ProTeam Visma–Lease a Bike	Netherlands	
Olga Tokarczuk	Writer, public intellectual, psychologist, feminist	Poland	
Leo Tolstoy	Novelist, short story writer, playwright, essayist	Russia	
Peter Tosh	Musician, member of The Wailers	Jamaica	
Devin Townsend	Musician, former member of Strapping Young Lad	United States	
Lily Travers	Actress	United Kingdom	
Paolo Troubetzkoy	Artist, sculptor	Russia	(Note: "Repin's contemporary the prominent sculptor Paolo Trubetskoi was also sympathetic to theosophical ideas and was a vegetarian and confirmed antivivisectionist".)
Mary L. Trump	Psychologist, writer	United States	
Trương Thị May	Beauty pageant titleholder	Vietnam	
Titia van der Tuuk	Author, feminist, pacifist, teacher	Netherlands	
Shania Twain	Singer-songwriter, television personality	Canada	
Richard Ungewitter	Writer, pioneer of the German nudist movement	Germany	
Uphill Battle	Metalcore band	United States	
Mellie Uyldert	Writer, alternative healer, occultist and astrologer	Netherlands	
Steve Vai	Guitarist, composer, singer, songwriter, producer	United States	
Pedro Valdjiu	Musician, member of Blasted Mechanism	Portugal	
Fernando Vallejo	Novelist, filmmaker, essayist	Colombia	
Ville Valo	Musician	Finland	
Dada Vaswani	Spiritual leader	India	
Sadhu Vaswani	Spiritual leader	India	
Gee Vaucher	Visual artist	United Kingdom	
Eddie Vedder	Musician, songwriter, member of alternative rock band Pearl Jam	United States	
David Velasco	Editor	United States	
Marly van der Velden	Actress	Netherlands	(Note: (Original Dutch) V: "Waarom ben je vegetariër?" A: "'Ik vind het onzin om vlees te eten terwijl er tegenwoordig genoeg vleesvervangers zijn. Vlees eten is ontzettend zielig voor de diertjes. Ik ben dus zeker al twee jaar vegetariër." (Translation into English) Q: "Why are you a vegetarian?" A: "I think there is no sense in eating meat since there are loads of alternatives available. Eating meat, it's so sad for those poor animals. So I have been a vegetarian for at least two years.")
Krista van Velzen	Politician	Netherlands	
Milo Ventimiglia	Actor, director	United States	
Georgina Verbaan	Actress, singer	Netherlands	
Dirk Verbeuren	Drummer for melodic death metal band Soilwork	Belgium	
Umberto Veronesi	Surgeon and oncologist	Italy	
Virgil	Poet	Italy	
Yolandi Visser	Musician	South Africa	
M. Visvesvaraya	Indian engineer, scholar, statesman and the Diwan of Mysore	India	
Swami Vivekananda	Chief disciple of the 19th-century saint Ramakrishna	India	
Voltaire	Writer, philosopher, playwright	France	
Marijke Vos	Politician	Netherlands	
Ed Vulliamy	Journalist	United Kingdom	
Vydūnas	Teacher, poet, humanist, philosopher and writer	Lithuania	
Jeffrey Walker	Vocalist and bassist for extreme metal band Carcass	United Kingdom	
David Wallechinsky	Author of many Olympic reference books and other reference books	United States	
George Watsky	Hip hop artist, author and poet	United States	
Gerard Way	Singer/songwriter, comic book writer, My Chemical Romance frontman	United States	
Keenen Ivory Wayans	Actor, comedian	United States	
Bernard Weatherill	Politician, Speaker of the House of Commons	United Kingdom	
Beatrice Webb	Sociologist, economist, socialist	United Kingdom	
John Wesley	Founder of Methodism	United Kingdom	
Charlotte Wessels	Singer-songwriter, lead vocalist of Delain	Netherlands	
Vivienne Westwood	Fashion designer	United Kingdom	
Jason Whalley	Singer for punk rock band Frenzal Rhomb	Australia	
Gemma Whelan	Actress	United Kingdom	
Forest Whitaker	Actor, producer, director	United States	
Ellen G. White	Author and co-founder of the Seventh-day Adventist Church	United States	
Zara Whites	Former adult film actress	Netherlands	(Note: "[..] or Zara Whites, a former Dutch porn actress. The militant vegetarian made a half-naked appearance at the last 'Salon International de l'Agriculture'"[..])
Norbert Wiener	Mathematician, famous child prodigy, originator of cybernetics	United States	
Evan Williams	Internet entrepreneur, co-founder of Twitter	United States	
Wendy O. Williams	Singer, actress, member of the punk rock band Plasmatics	United States	
Liam Wilson	Musician	United States	
Steven Wilson	Rock musician	United Kingdom	
Wismichu	YouTuber	Spain	
Dominic Wood	Entertainer and magician	United Kingdom	
S. Fowler Wright	Novelist	United Kingdom	(Note: He (Wright) did not smoke or eat meat, rarely drank alcohol, and exercised with a rare determination".)
Esmé Wynne-Tyson	Actress and writer	United Kingdom	
Jon Wynne-Tyson	Publisher, Quaker, activist and pacifist who founded Centaur Press in 1954	United Kingdom	
Shmuly Yanklowitz	Modern Orthodox Rabbi, activist, educator, writer, motivational speaker, social entrepreneur, founder of Uri L'Tzedek	United States	
"Weird Al" Yankovic	Comedy musician	United States	
Nuseir Yassin	Vlogger	Israel	
Owain Yeoman	Actor	United Kingdom	
Yoon Jin-seo	Actress	South Korea	
Thom Yorke	Musician, singer and principal songwriter of the alternative rock band Radiohead	United Kingdom	
Cy Young	Baseball pitcher	United States	
Marguerite Yourcenar	Author, essayist, poet	France	
Zarathustra	Founder of Zoroastrianism	Iran	
Ieva Zasimauskaitė	Singer	Lithuania	
Zendaya	Actress, singer-songwriter	United States	

== See also ==
- List of vegans
- List of fictional vegetarian characters
