= Henri W.PH.E. van den Bergh van Eysinga =

Dutch religious socialist

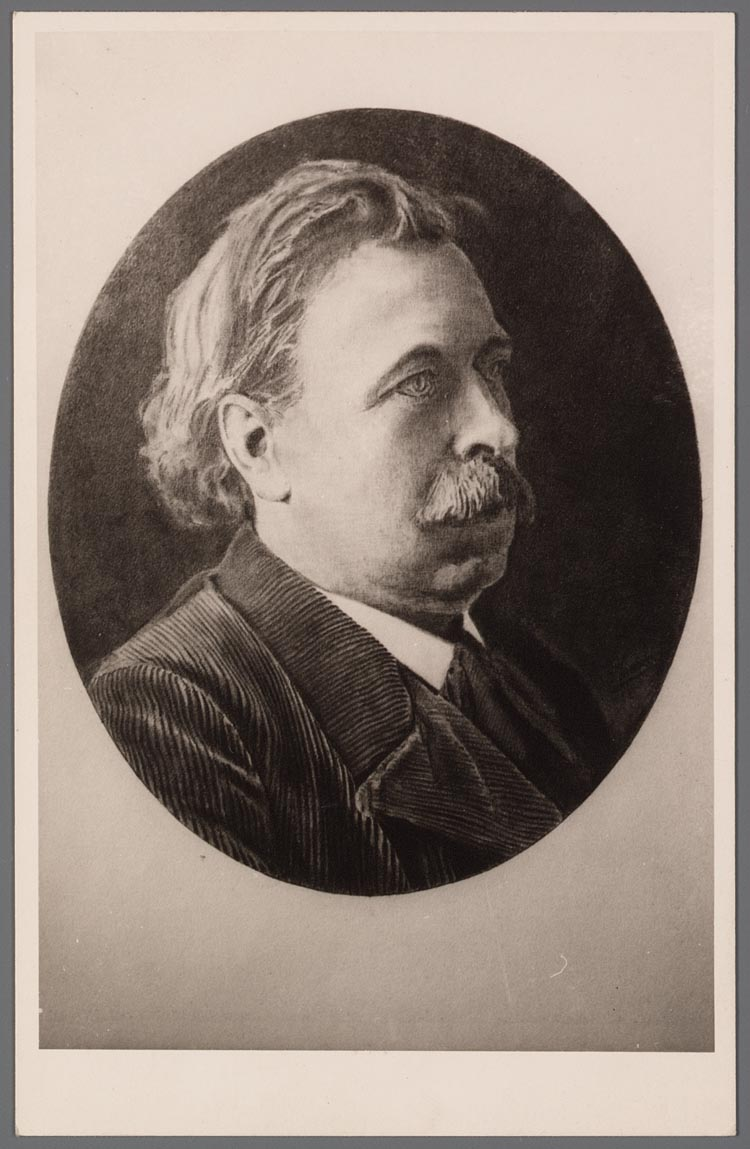

Henri W.PH.E. van den Bergh van Eysinga (born Henri Wilhelm Philippus Elize van den Bergh van Eysinga on 9 August 1868 – 15 April 1920) was a Dutch religious socialist. He was born in The Hague and he died in Zutphen. He was revolutionary and a philosophical writer. In his book The soul of mankind (Dutch: De ziel der mensheid) he describes how children should be raised not to harm anyone and respect life.
