= Amílcar de Sousa =

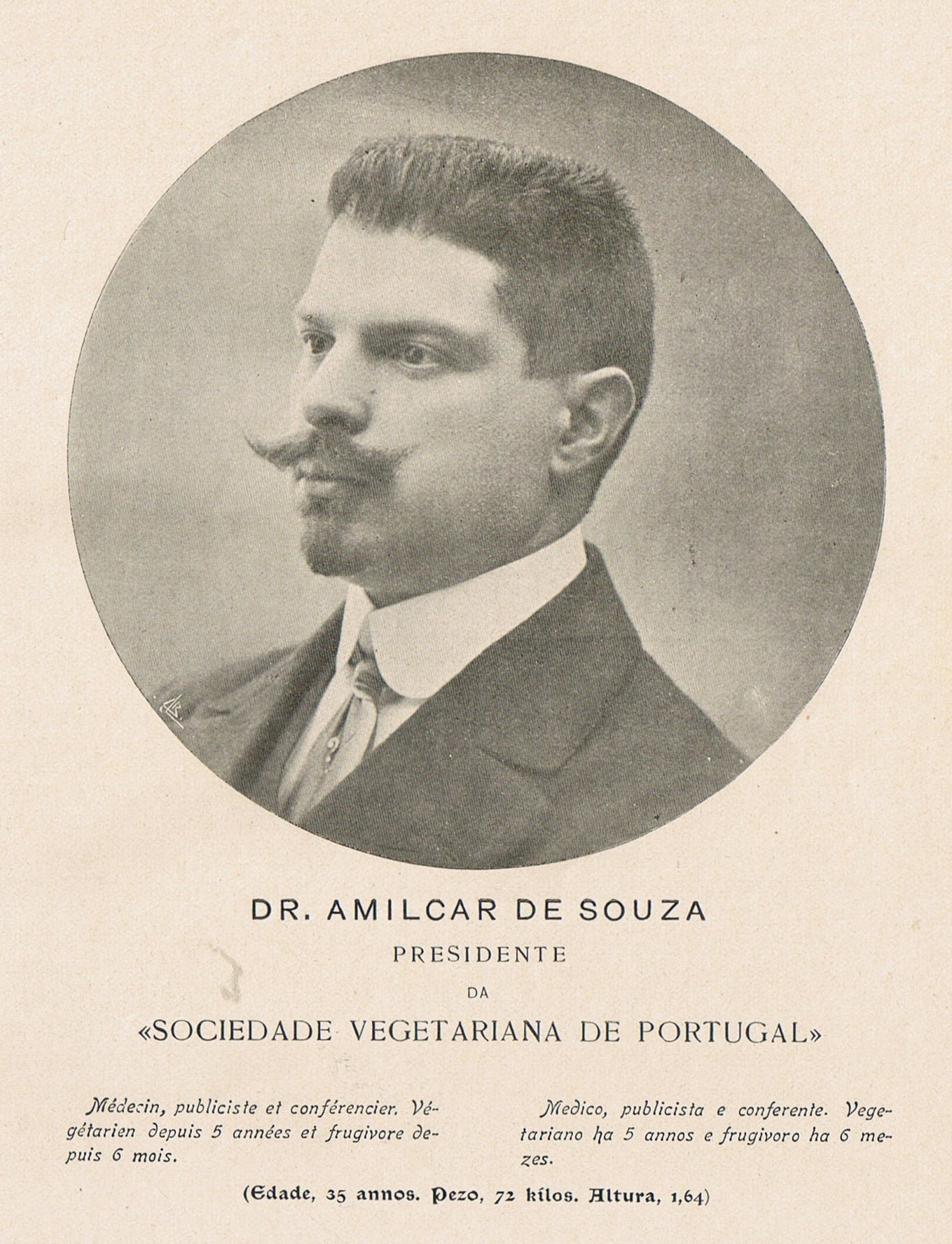
Portrait of Dr. Amílcar de Sousa, from "O Vegetariano", volume II, 1911

Amílcar Augusto Queirós de Sousa (European Portuguese pronunciation: [ɐˈmilkaɾ awˈɣuʃtu kɐjˈɾɔʒ ðɨ ˈsozɐ]; 1876–1940) was a Portuguese medical doctor, and author of many health books, the most famous of which being O Naturismo (Naturism), published in 1912.

== Biography ==
A pioneer of vegetarianism in Portugal, he was the president of the first Portuguese vegetarian society, the Sociedade Vegetariana de Portugal, founded in the city of Porto, 1911, and the director of O Vegetariano (The Vegetarian), a monthly magazine on vegetarianism.

A native of Alijó, Sousa corresponded with many well-known personalities from medicine and science, such as the German naturalist Ernst Haeckel, the American medical doctor John Harvey Kellogg, and the French physician Paul Carton.

He advocated a raw vegetarian diet. He was also against eggs, milk, tobacco and alcohol. He said that eating an egg was the same as ”eating a chicken embryo” and that milk was “not the food of man.”

D. M. Richardson wrote in the magazine The Healthy Life (July, 1912):

It is, by the way, interesting, to note in connection with this question of frutarianism, of fruit and salad eaters, that Dr. Amilcar de Souza, the president of the Portuguese Vegetarian Society, whose dietary, formed strictly of fruit and nuts, we quoted recently, has now added a cress salad to each of his meals. His plan at the present moment is as follows: - two meals a day, at noon and at six o’clock, and at each of them twenty-five nuts, six apples, six oranges, twelve dates and cress salad. He finds himself in the best of health.

He was also a pacifist and frequently criticized war in his articles.

He considered Pythagoras to be the most notable philosopher of all time and wrote that Jean-Jacques Rousseau was the best educator, as in Émile, or On Education, he valued education in contact with nature.

He was also an active defender of the interests of Duriense Viticulture, arguing, in conferences and articles in the periodic press, for the creation of the Casa do Douro as one of the necessary bodies to guarantee the high quality of Port Wine and promote the expansion of its Trade.

Sousa died in Porto in 1940.

== Books in Spanish ==
Most of his books have been translated to Spanish. Some of them are:

- El naturismo La Gutenberg. 1913. Valencia.
- La salud por el naturismo La Gutenberg. 1918. Valencia
- Tesis médica naturista
- La curación del estreñimiento
- Catecismo naturista
- El naturismo en veinte lecciones
- Cómo detendremos la muerte? (with Capo, N.)
- Tesis Medica Naturista. Sauch. 1976. Barcelona

== See also ==
- Fruitarianism
- Veganism
- Raw foodism

== Sources ==
- O Vegetariano: Mensário Naturista Ilustrado, Porto.
- Grande enciclopédia portuguesa e brasileira, Edição de Editorial Enciclopédia, limitada, 1936, volume 29, p. 761.
- Grande enciclopédia portuguesa e brasileira, Edição de Editorial Enciclopédia, limitada, 1936, volume 34, p. 416.
- Delmar Domingos de Carvalho, Vegetarianismo, a solução para uma vida e um mundo melhor, Editorial Minerva, Lisboa, 2009
- A fotografia como prova documental da robustez dos vegetaristas, vegetarianos e frugívoros
