= List of Atrocity band members =

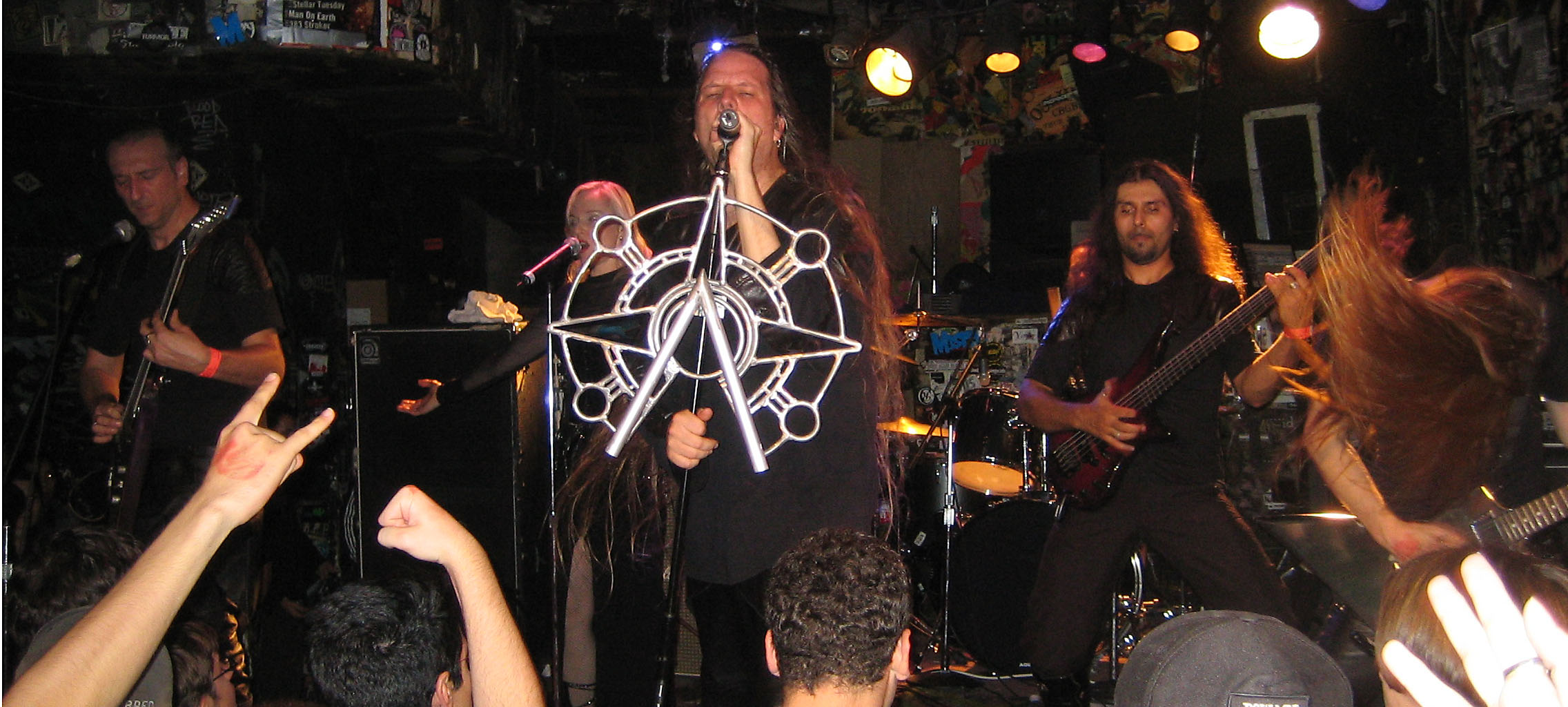
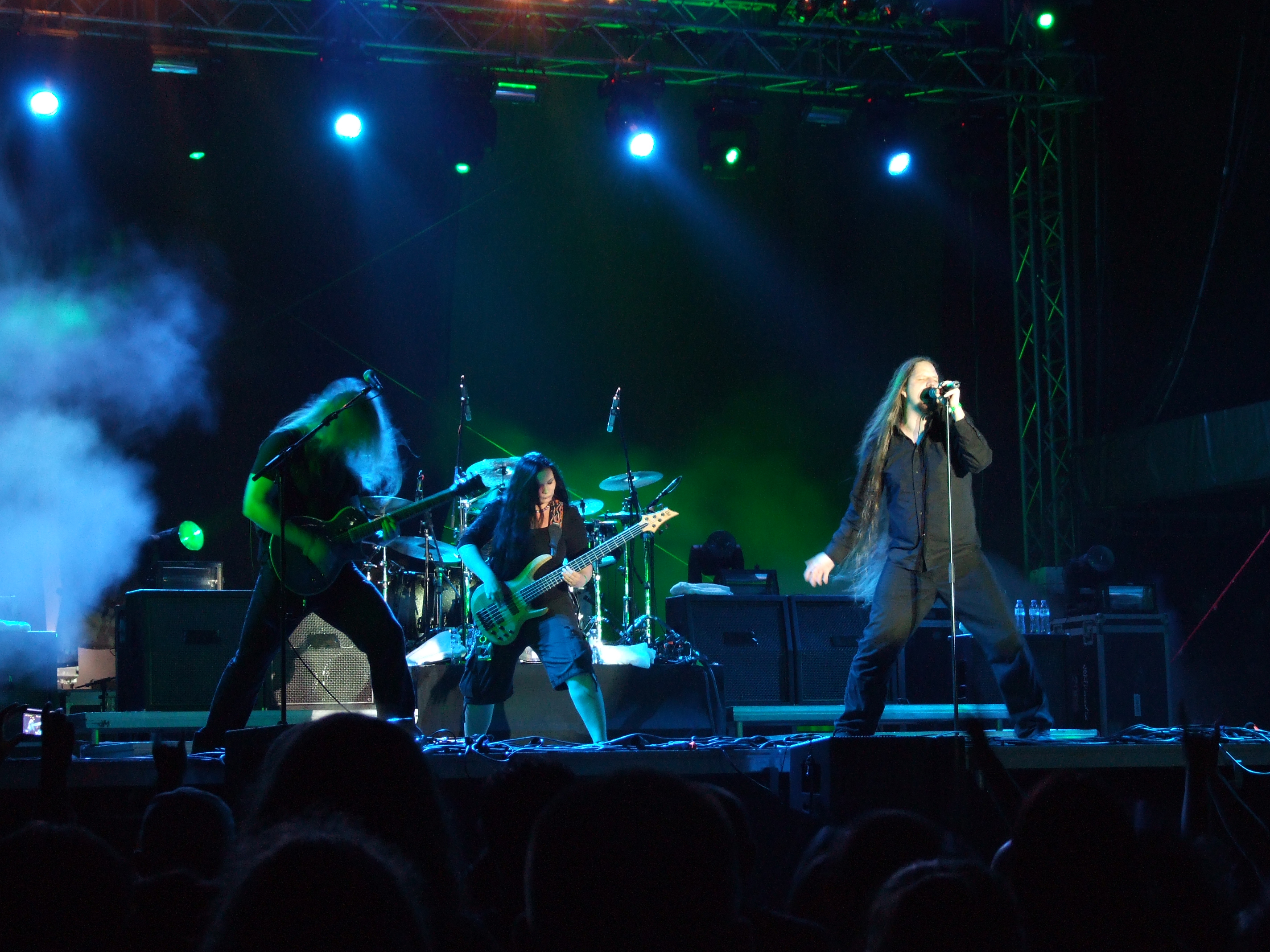
Two line-ups of Atrocity performing in 2005 and 2010

Atrocity are a German heavy metal band from Ludwigsburg. Formed in 1985, the group originally consisted of vocalist and keyboardist Alexander Krull, guitarists Mathias Röderer and Frank Knodel, bassist René Tometschek, and drummer Gernot Winkler. The band's current lineup includes Krull, the sole constant member, alongside drummer Joris Nijenhuis (since 2012), guitarist Micki Richter (since 2019), bassist Andre Nasso (since 2021) and guitarist Luc Gebhardt (since 2022).

== History ==
Atrocity formed in 1985, with the original lineup consisting of Alexander Krull on vocals, Mathias Röderer and Frank Knodel on guitars, René Tometschek on bass, and Gernot Winkler on drums. After releasing their first demo Instigators in 1988, the group replaced Winkler with Michael Schwarz, signed with Nuclear Blast, and released "Blue Blood" in 1989. Shortly thereafter, the group recruited guitarist Richard Scharf and bassist Oliver Klasen to replace Knodel and Tometschek, respectively, and the new lineup released the band's full-length debut Hallucinations in 1990. Todessehnsucht followed in 1992, before Klasen was replaced by Markus Knapp for the recording of 1994's Blut. Before a European tour at the end of the year, Thorsten Bauer joined Atrocity as a third guitarist.

During 1995, both Scharf and Knapp left the band, with the latter replaced by new bassist Chris Lukhaup. The lineup of Krull, Röderer, Bauer, Lukhaup and Schwarz released Willenskraft in 1996 and Werk 80 in 1997, before Martin Schmidt took over on drums from May 1999. Gemini and Atlantis followed in 2000 and 2004, respectively, before Schmidt was replaced by Moritz Neuner in January 2005. Neuner played on just one album, Werk 80 II, before leaving Atrocity and spin-off Leaves' Eyes alongside Lukhaup in November 2007 – Lukhaup for "personal reasons" and Neuner for "another turn in his working career". In January 2008, Alla Fedynitch and Nick Barker were announced as both bands' new bassist and drummer, respectively. By October, Barker had been replaced by Seven Antonopoulos.

In January 2010, Krull became the sole original member of Atrocity when guitarist Mathias Röderer left the group for "family reasons". He was replaced by Sander van der Meer. Two more lineup changes occurred later in the year – in the summer, Antonopoulos was replaced by Roland Navratil, and in October, Fedynitch made way for JB van der Wal (who became an official member in May 2011). Navratil remained until February 2012, when he left for "private reasons" and was replaced by Joris Nijenhuis. By the end of the year, the group had become a four-piece after the departure of van der Wal. Guitarist Bauer performed all bass on the 2013 release Okkult. Bauer continued to cover bass duties during Atrocity and Leaves' Eyes live shows following the release of Okkult.

Pete Streit replaced van der Meer in September 2015, after several months filling in for the former guitarist. He performed on 2018's Okkult II, before leaving for "private reasons" in November 2019 to be replaced by Micki Richter. In June 2021, the band returned to a five-member setup for the first time since 2013 with the addition of Andre Nasso on bass. At the end of the year, Atrocity announced that Bauer would be leaving the band after more than 25 years in the lineup, with the guitarist and bassist writing in a statement that "I feel that now is the right time for me to ... look forward to and embrace new things and challenges in my life." Bauer was not replaced until September 2022, when Luc Gebhardt took his place.

== Members ==
=== Current ===
Image	Name	Years active	Instruments	Release contributions
	Alexander Krull	1985–present	lead vocals; keyboards; samples; programming	all Atrocity releases
	Joris Nijenhuis	2012–present	drums; backing vocals	all Atrocity releases from Die Gottlosen Jahre: Live in Wacken (2012) onwards, except Unspoken Names (Demo 1991) (2022)
	Micki Richter	2019–present	guitar	Okkult III (2023)
	Andre Nasso	2021–present	bass	Okkult III (2023)
	Luc Gebhardt	2022–present	guitar	Okkult III (2023)

=== Former ===
Image	Name	Years active	Instruments	Release contributions
	Mathias Röderer	1985–2010	guitar	all Atrocity releases from Instigators (1988) to Werk 80 II (2008)
	Frank Knodel	1985–1989	guitar	Instigators (1988); "Blue Blood" (1989)
	René Tometschek	1985–1989	bass	Instigators (1988); "Blue Blood" (1989)
	Gernot Winkler	1985–1988	drums	Instigators (1988)
	Michael Schwarz	1988–1999	drums; percussion	all Atrocity releases from "Blue Blood" (1989) to Werk 80 (1997); Unspoken Names (Demo 1991) (2022)
	Richard Scharf	1989–1995	guitar	all Atrocity releases from Hallucinations (1990) to Die Liebe (1995); Unspoken Names (Demo 1991) (2022)
	Oliver Klasen	1989–1994	bass	Hallucinations (1990); Todessehnsucht (1992); Unspoken Names (Demo 1991) (2022)
	Markus Knapp	1994–1995	bass	Blut (1994); Calling the Rain (1995)
	Thorsten Bauer	1994–2021	guitar; bass (from 2012); occasional keyboards	all Atrocity releases from Calling the Rain (1995) to Okkult II (2018)
	Chris Lukhaup	1995–2007	bass	all Atrocity releases from Die Liebe (1995) to Werk 80 II (2008)
	Martin Schmidt	1999–2005	drums	Gemini (2000); Atlantis (2004)
	Moritz Neuner	2005–2007	drums	Werk 80 II (2008)
	Alla Fedynitch	2008–2010	bass	none
	Nick Barker	2008	drums	none
	Seven Antonopoulos	2008–2010	drums; percussion	After the Storm (2010)
	Sander van der Meer	2010–2015	guitar	Die Gottlosen Jahre (2012); Okkult (2013)
	Roland Navratil	2010–2012	drums; percussion	Die Gottlosen Jahre (2012)
	JB van der Wal	2010–2012	bass	Die Gottlosen Jahre (2012)
	Pete Streit	2015–2019	guitar	Okkult II (2018)

== Lineups ==
Period	Members	Releases
1985–1988	Alexander Krull – vocals, keyboards; Mathias Röderer – guitar; Frank Knodel – guitar; René Tometschek – bass; Gernot Winkler – drums	Instigators demo (1988)
1988–1989	Alexander Krull – vocals, keyboards; Mathias Röderer – guitar; Frank Knodel – guitar; René Tometschek – bass; Michael Schwarz – drums, percussion	"Blue Blood" (1989)
Late 1989 – early 1994	Alexander Krull – vocals, keyboards; Mathias Röderer – guitar; Richard Scharf – guitar; Oliver Klasen – bass; Michael Schwarz – drums, percussion	Hallucinations (1990); Todessehnsucht (1992); Unspoken Names (Demo 1991) (2022)
Early – late 1994	Alexander Krull – vocals, keyboards; Mathias Röderer – guitar; Richard Scharf – guitar; Markus Knapp – bass; Michael Schwarz – drums, percussion	Blut (1994)
Late 1994 – early 1995	Alexander Krull – vocals, keyboards; Mathias Röderer – guitar; Richard Scharf – guitar; Thorsten Bauer – guitar; Markus Knapp – bass; Michael Schwarz – drums, percussion	Calling the Rain (1995)
Early – late 1995	Alexander Krull – vocals, keyboards; Mathias Röderer – guitar; Richard Scharf – guitar; Thorsten Bauer – guitar; Chris Lukhaup – bass; Michael Schwarz – drums, percussion	Die Liebe (1995)
Late 1995 – May 1999	Alexander Krull – vocals, keyboards; Mathias Röderer – guitar; Thorsten Bauer – guitar; Chris Lukhaup – bass; Michael Schwarz – drums, percussion	Willenskraft (1996); Werk 80 (1997)
May 1999 – January 2005	Alexander Krull – vocals, keyboards; Mathias Röderer – guitar; Thorsten Bauer – guitar; Chris Lukhaup – bass; Martin Schmidt – drums	Gemini (2000); Atlantis (2004)
January 2005 – November 2007	Alexander Krull – vocals, keyboards; Mathias Röderer – guitar; Thorsten Bauer – guitar; Chris Lukhaup – bass; Moritz Neuner – drums	Werk 80 II (2008)
January – October 2008	Alexander Krull – vocals, keyboards; Mathias Röderer – guitar; Thorsten Bauer – guitar; Alla Fedynitch – bass; Nick Barker – drums	none
October 2008 – January 2010	Alexander Krull – vocals, keyboards; Mathias Röderer – guitar; Thorsten Bauer – guitar; Alla Fedynitch – bass; Seven Antonopoulos – drums, percussion	none
January – summer 2010	Alexander Krull – vocals, keyboards; Thorsten Bauer – guitar; Sander van der Meer – guitar; Alla Fedynitch – bass; Seven Antonopoulos – drums, percussion	After the Storm (2010)
Summer – October 2010	Alexander Krull – vocals, keyboards; Thorsten Bauer – guitar; Sander van der Meer – guitar; Alla Fedynitch – bass; Roland Navratil – drums, percussion	none
October 2010 – February 2012	Alexander Krull – vocals, keyboards; Thorsten Bauer – guitar; Sander van der Meer – guitar; JB van der Wal – bass; Roland Navratil – drums, percussion	Die Gottlosen Jahre (2012)
February – late 2012	Alexander Krull – lead vocals, keyboards; Thorsten Bauer – guitar; Sander van der Meer – guitar; JB van der Wal – bass; Joris Nijenhuis – drums, backing vocals	none
Late 2012 – early 2015	Alexander Krull – lead vocals, keyboards; Sander van der Meer – guitar; Thorsten Bauer – bass, guitar; Joris Nijenhuis – drums, backing vocals	Okkult (2013)
September 2015 – November 2019	Alexander Krull – lead vocals, keyboards; Pete Streit – guitar; Thorsten Bauer – bass, guitar; Joris Nijenhuis – drums, backing vocals	Okkult II (2018)
November 2019 – June 2021	Alexander Krull – lead vocals, keyboards; Micki Richter – guitar; Thorsten Bauer – bass, guitar; Joris Nijenhuis – drums, backing vocals	none
June – December 2021	Alexander Krull – lead vocals, keyboards; Thorsten Bauer – guitar; Micki Richter – guitar; Andre Nasso – bass; Joris Nijenhuis – drums, backing vocals	none
January – September 2022	Alexander Krull – lead vocals, keyboards; Micki Richter – guitar; Andre Nasso – bass; Joris Nijenhuis – drums, backing vocals	none
September 2022 – present	Alexander Krull – lead vocals, keyboards; Micki Richter – guitar; Luc Gebhardt – guitar; Andre Nasso – bass; Joris Nijenhuis – drums, backing vocals	Okkult III (2023)
