= Andy Gerold =

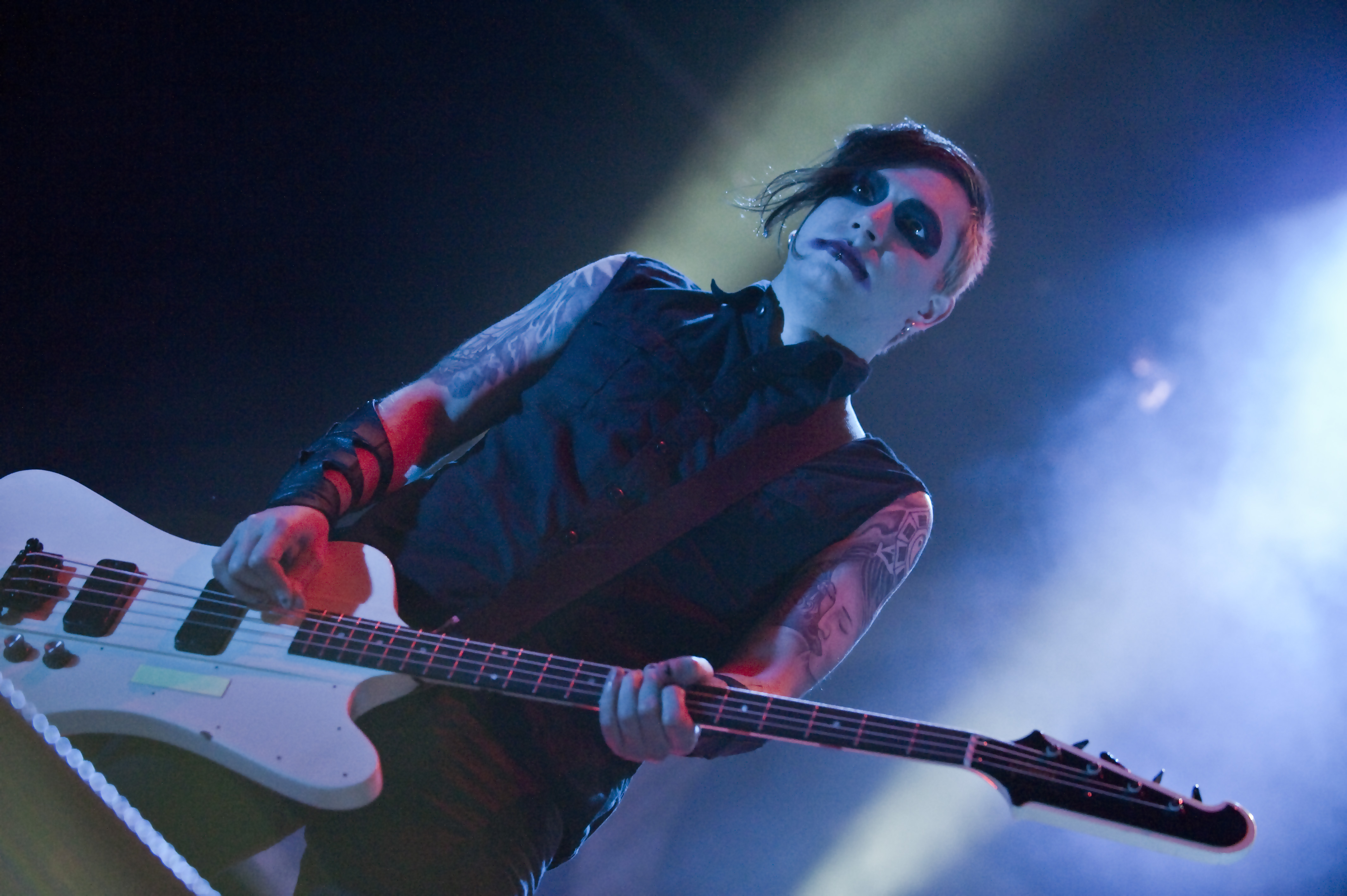
- Andy performing live with Marilyn Manson, 2009

Background information
- Born: June 13, 1978 (age 47); Sandusky, Ohio
- Genres: Industrial rock
- Instruments: Guitar, Bass, Drums

Andy Gerold (born June 13, 1978) is a professional multi-instrumentalist and is best known as a former bassist of Marilyn Manson. Currently playing guitar for "Rock of Ages" at The Crown Theater, located in The Rio All-Suite Hotel & Casino in Las Vegas (as of 1/2016).

== Biography ==
=== Early life ===
Gerold studied music at Phoenix, Arizona's New School for the Arts 1994-1996 escaping the traditional high school arithmetic. His influences as a guitar player include Robin Finck, Jonny Greenwood, and John Williams. During his time at NSA, he started playing music with David Cadry, and his brother, Theodore Gerold, in his first band 8 Feet Under.

=== Victims In Ecstacy ===
In 1998 Gerold formed Victims In Ecstacy with lead singer Jim Louvau. The band was heavily influenced by Chicago based underground rock drag band Mary's Window and other industrial rock bands of the 1990s. The band often wore dresses, skirts, feminine make-up, and boas onstage to set themselves apart from other valley bands. They quickly gained local success with the release of their debut E.P Chinese Pornography and opened for bands like Linkin Park, Disturbed, MDFMK, Jack Off Jill, My Life with the Thrill Kill Kult, and Pitchshifter. Victims In Ecstacy also won 5 Phoenix New Times Showcase awards including "Best Industrial Act" and "Most Likely to Make It Big". During the recording of the band's second record White Box Therapy, they were invited to open dates on the Preaching to the Perverted tour with Pigface, Gravity Kills, and Godhead where Gerold played drums for Victims In Ecstacy.

=== Opiate for the Masses ===
Gerold had a brief stint in Los Angeles/Phoenix based industrial rock band Opiate for the Masses. He contributed the band's second record The Spore and toured with them on the 2005 Warped Tour, Avenged Sevenfold, and Orgy tour. Gerold quit the band after the departure of drummer Elias Mallin.

=== My Darling Murder ===
After leaving Opiate For the Masses Gerold returned to Phoenix to form My Darling Murder with drummer Elias Mallin, bassist Tim Kelleher, and singer Chris Ruoff. The band's influences included Faith No More, Nine Inch Nails, Marilyn Manson, Radiohead, Tool, and Muse. Gerold was the band's primary songwriter and also produced the band's demos. These recordings caught the eye of NIN/Manson/Gn'R producer Sean Beavan. Beavan went on to produce the band debut 5-song e.p before the band had ever played a show.

My Darling Murder quickly gained local notoriety and eventually would share the stage with bands like Greeley Estates, Scary Kids Scaring Kids, Smile Empty Soul, and Blindside. They would also go on to re-release their e.p with 5 additional Gerold produced tracks before a brief tour with Thirty Seconds to Mars, and Seether. Just as more of the music industry started to take notice of the band singer Ruoff surprisingly quit the band prematurely. The band still has many dedicated online fan communities following the band members current projects.

=== Wired All Wrong ===
In 2006 Gerold was the touring guitarist for Los Angeles-based electro rockers Wired All Wrong which featured singer Matt Mahaffey of Self, former God Lives Underwater keyboard player Jeff Turzo, and My Darling Murder bassist Tim Kelleher. Wired All Wrong toured regionally to support Break out the Battle Tapes before Mahaffey and Turzo returned to producing other acts.

=== Daughters of Mara ===
After full filling touring obligation with Wired All Wrong Gerold joined Virgin Records recording artists Daughters of Mara as its permanent bassist. Gerold toured regionally with the band and played bass on the band's debut record I am Destroyer. The record was recorded in Canada by well-famous producer Garth "GGGarth" Richardson in 2007. I am Destroyer never had a proper release thanks to decline of the major label record system but is available on the band's Myspace page.

=== Ashes Divide ===
Gerold was the touring lead guitarist for A Perfect Circle guitarist Billy Howerdel's solo project Ashes Divide in support of its debut release Keep Telling Myself It's Alright. After playing a handful of radio festivals Ashes Divide supported Stone Temple Pilots on selected dates of their reunion tour. The band were also invited to open the main stage at the 2008 edition of the Projekt Revolution tour joining such heavyweights as Linkin Park, Chris Cornell, Atreyu, and The Bravery. During the tour Linkin Park singer Chester Bennington joined the band for a cover of A Perfect Circle's track The Outsider. After Projekt Revolution the band ended its touring cycle with two weeks worth of dates with Seether.

=== Marilyn Manson ===
After much fan speculation and no official announcement, Gerold joined Marilyn Manson as the live bassist for The High End of the Low world tour after former bassist Twiggy Ramirez switched to guitar duties. Gerold played his first show with the band on June 3, 2009, in Brno, Czech Republic.

=== 16VOLT ===
Gerold is currently playing guitar for 16Volt on the KMFDM North America 2011 Tour. E Powell: "I've known Andy for quite some time and he is just super talented. We really wanted to play with him and that feeling was shared in return. It was really as simple as a phone call. "Hey Andy, wanna go do this with us?" And here he is."" Gerold is featured in 16Volts new official music video "Burn", .
