= Ron Underwood (musician) =

Musician and director from Phoenix, Arizona

Ron "Thunderwood" Underwood is a musician and director from Phoenix, Arizona. He was the lead vocalist for Los Angeles–based bands 9ELECTRIC and Opiate For The Masses.

== Music career ==
Underwood founded Opiate for the Masses, a post-hardcore band from Arizona in 1999. They formed in Phoenix by Underwood, Elias Mallin, Dustin Lyon and Jim Kaufman. The meaning of their name came from the Karl Marx quote that says the organized religion is an opiate for oppressed countries and cultures. In June 2009, they posted on their MySpace page that they had broken up and gone their separate ways.

In 2010, the band 9ELECTRIC was formed by Underwood, Mikey Lopez, Micah Electric, and Casey DC. They were signed to Another Century Records.

In 2014, they released their EP "Control."

In July 2016, they released their debut album "The Damaged Ones"

In September 2018, Ron announced via Facebook (supported by bravewords.com) that they had signed a deal with Pavement Entertainment and expect to release their new album 'Megalith' early 2019.

On January 24 2020, band leader Ron Underwood announced that the band was disbanding on the official Facebook page. The band cited the ongoing challenges in the music industry and the general direction of their genre. Underwood expressed his pride that the band's line-up had remained stable over the years, with only bassist Casey Mahomey and programmer Micah "Electric" being the only members to have permanently departed from the band. Mikey Lopez, the guitarist, went on to form a new touring band caled REDSTAR.
