= Seven Antonopoulos =

American musician (born 1973)

- Born: Chris Antonopoulos; November 7, 1973 (age 52)
- Genres: Metal rock gothic metal post-grunge alternative metal
- Occupation: Musician
- Instruments: drums & percussion
- Labels: Napalm Records; Nuclear Blast; Century Media; American VooDoo; SBK Records

Chris Antonopoulos (born on November 7, 1973 in Dallas, Texas) is an American rock drummer, most notable for his tenure in Opiate for the Masses.

== Career ==
Antonopoulos joined Phoenix/Los Angeles hard rock band Opiate for the Masses as a drummer in 2004. Before this time, he was a drummer for Vanilla Ice for three years. In 2006, he toured with the Revolting Cocks. On 21 August 2008, he played with Ron "Bumblefoot" Thal's (Guns N' Roses) All Star Band at Rock Against Diabetes. On 3 November 2008, he left Opiate for the Masses and joined German bands Atrocity and Leaves' Eyes. He resigned from Atrocity on 27 March 2010. Seven currently plays drums for the Belgian band Channel Zero and appears in the band's 2018 Exit Humanity documentary .

Seven describes his approach to the drums as "the idea of putting on a show as well as having fun and playing. He has been featured in Modern Drummer, China's Modern Player and Drum Magazine and blogged for Modern Drummer.

He performed with the Percussive Arts Society (PASIC) in 2008 and has delivered drum clinics around the world in the United States, China, Sweden and Norway.

Seven also serves as host of the YouTube series Metal Wine Guide which brings together metal musicians who love wine and the canned wine industry.

== Equipment ==
Drums - PDP and DW

- 18x24 bass drum (2x)
- 12x14 floor tom used between bass drums in place of rack tom
- 16x18 floor tom
- 18x20 bass drum on floor tom legs used as floor tom
- 14x16 floor tom (on left side)
- 7x14 DW cast steel snare
- 6x12 DW Edge snare

Cymbals - Sabian (from left to right)

- 20" APX Solid Crash
- 20" AA Metal-X Chinese
- 14" AAX X-Celerator Hi-Hats
- 20" AA Metal-X Crash
- 20" AAX Metal Crash
- 24" (custom) HH Power Bell Ride
- 20" AA Rock Crash
- 20" HH Chinese
- 20" Paragon Crash
- 12" Chopper
- 20" AA Rock Crash
- 9" Alu Bell (mounted on top of 2nd AA rock crash)

Drumheads - Aquarian

- Snare: Hi-Energy (Batter); Classic Clear Snare Side (Reso)
- All Toms: Clear Performance II (Batter); Classic Clear Video Gloss Black (Reso)
- Bass: Superkick II (Batter); Regulator Small Hole (Reso)

Drumsticks-Vic Firth

- Vic Firth American Classic rock w/ wood tips

== Associated acts ==
- Channel Zero (2014–Present) - member
- Beasto Blanco (2019) - touring
- Brand New Machine (2013–2014) - member
- Livan (2011–2013) - touring
- Atrocity (2008–2010) - member
- Leaves' Eyes (2008–2010) - member
- Revolting Cocks (2006) - touring
- Opiate for the Masses (2005–2008) - member
- Vanilla Ice (2001–2004) - touring
- Hellafied Funk Crew (1996–2001) - member
- Lone Star Trio (1993–1996) - member

== Discography ==
=== with Lone Star Trio ===
==== Studio albums ====
- 21 Songs (1993)
- Four Play (1995)

=== with Hellafied Funk Crew ===
- 1998 "Hellafied Funk Crew"

=== with V-Ice ===
==== Studio albums ====
- 2001 Bi-Polar

=== with Opiate for the Masses ===
==== Studio albums ====
- The Spore (2005)
- Manifesto (2008)

=== Compilations ===
- Jagermeister Music Tour (2006)
- Taste of Christmas (2005)
- Saw II soundtrack
- Saw III soundtrack
- The Best of Taste of Chaos
- The Best of Taste of Chaos Two.

=== with Leaves' Eyes ===
==== Albums ====
- Njord (2009)

=== with Atrocity ===
==== Albums ====
- After the Storm (2010)

=== with Liv Kristine ===
==== Albums ====
- Skintight (2010)

=== with Channel Zero ===
==== Albums ====
- Channel Zero Unplugged (2017)
- Exit Humanity (2017)
- Channel Zero 30th Anniversary (2020)

=== Live Session Member Of ===
- Revolting Cocks 2006–present

== Personal life ==
Antonopoulos became fast friends with Ministry’s Al Jourgensen and was married to Anna Kjellberg who also played in his former band Opiate for the Masses.
