= Bleed the Dream =

American rock band

- Origin: Los Angeles, California, U.S.
- Genres: Post-hardcore, alternative rock
- Years active: 2003–2007, 2008–present
- Labels: Warcon
- Members: Brandon Thomas; Dave Aguilera; Keith Thompson; Christian Rivera; Justin Posner
- Past members: Scott Gottlieb; Mark Holmes; Tom Breyfogle

Bleed the Dream is an American post-hardcore/alternative rock band from Southern California.

== History ==
=== 2003–2005: Formation to Built by Blood ===
Keith Thompson left Baltimore for Los Angeles in 2002, and Brandon Thomas followed in early 2003. The pair formed Bleed the Dream in spring 2003.

Moving to Los Angeles, the band spent the next year touring from city to city and polishing their sound, landing a spot on the Warped Tour in 2004, and again in 2005.

In 2004, the band's guitarist, Dave Aguilera, created his own label, Maphia Records, which released two EPs by the band: "Awake" and the unplugged, acoustic "Asleep". The band subsequently released a DVD, No Apologies, edited by Scott Gottlieb from tour footage and behind the scene fan cameras.

Kevin Lyman, creator of the Warped Tour, created his own label, Warcon Enterprises, signed Bleed the Dream, and released their first full-length album, Built By Blood in May 2005.

In spring 2005, Bleed the Dream joined the Taste of Chaos tour featuring The Used and My Chemical Romance. During this time, Scott Gottlieb fell ill due to the rough life on the road, having collapsed during a performance a year earlier and been rushed to hospital. He was diagnosed with leukemia and died on April 10, 2005, two weeks before the release of Built by Blood.

=== 2006–2007: Killer Inside and breakup ===
Bleed the Dream finished 2005 by joining Taste of Chaos Europe with headliners The Used and Story of the Year. In December, the band took time off touring to write, and Tom Breyfogle from Ohio replaced Gottlieb on drums in January 2006. On May 24, 2006, the band released a press statement announcing that Brandon Thomas would no longer be singing for the group, to be replaced by Mark Holmes, former lead singer of Like Yesterday, who would sing for the band from 2006 to 2007.

In April 2006, Bleed the Dream toured the U.K. supporting Story of the Year, alongside hardcore punk band Stretch Arm Strong. They then joined Never Heard of It, Army of Freshmen, and Crowned King on tour in Japan.

In July 2006, the band recorded a new album in Canada with producers Garth Richardson and Ben Caplan, entitled Killer Inside. In late 2006, the band finished filming a music video for the song "Closer", the first single from Killer Inside. The video features the band members playing grim reaper type stalkers to the lead singer, and finishes with the band playing paramedics to their bloody lead singer.

On September 24, 2007, Bleed the Dream posted a bulletin on MySpace announcing that "After many years of ups and downs we're calling it quits...".

=== 2014–present: Reformation ===
In 2014, Thomas became the lead vocalist again. The following year the band announced that it would reunite to record a new EP, adding long-time guitar and bass tech, Fatally Yours guitarist Christian Rivera as a permanent member on rhythm guitar.

In 2017, Bleed the Dream began work on a new EP, with Periphery's Matt Halpern filling in on drums.

== Tours ==
The band has appeared on the Taste of Chaos Tour and the Van's Warped Tour. They are also featured in a Warped Tour documentary, Wake Up Screaming. Their song "Streets of Baltimore" was played for a national audience during a FOX broadcast of a Baltimore Ravens' football game on November 19, 2006. Recently, they appeared on Japanese rock band Dir En Grey's Inward Scream Tour, which began on February 1, 2007 in Fort Lauderdale, Florida.

== Members ==
=== Current members ===
- Brandon Thomas – vocals (2003–2006, 2008–present)
- Dave Aguilera – guitar (2003–present)
- Keith Thompson – bass/vocals (2003–present)
- Christian Rivera – guitar (2014–present)
- Justin Posner – drums (2015–present)

=== Past members ===
- Scott Gottlieb – drums (2003–2005) (deceased)
- Tom Breyfogle – drums (2006–2007)
- Mark Holmes – vocals (2006–2007)

=== Tour members ===
- Aaron Edmunds – drums
- Aaron Cohan – drums
- Robin Nicholl – guitars

== Discography ==
=== Albums ===
- Built by Blood (Warcon, 2005)
- Killer Inside (Warcon, 2007)

=== EPs ===
- Awake (Noize Pollution, 2003)
- Asleep (Adrenaline, 2004)

=== DVDs ===
- No Apologies (Maphia, 2005)

=== Soundtracks ===
- Without a Paddle (film) (2004) – "Pop Song"

=== Compilations ===
- Taste of Christmas
- Taste of Chaos
- The Best of Taste of Chaos
- The Best of Taste of Chaos Two
- Punk the Clock
