= Trouble Agency =

Belgian thrash metal band

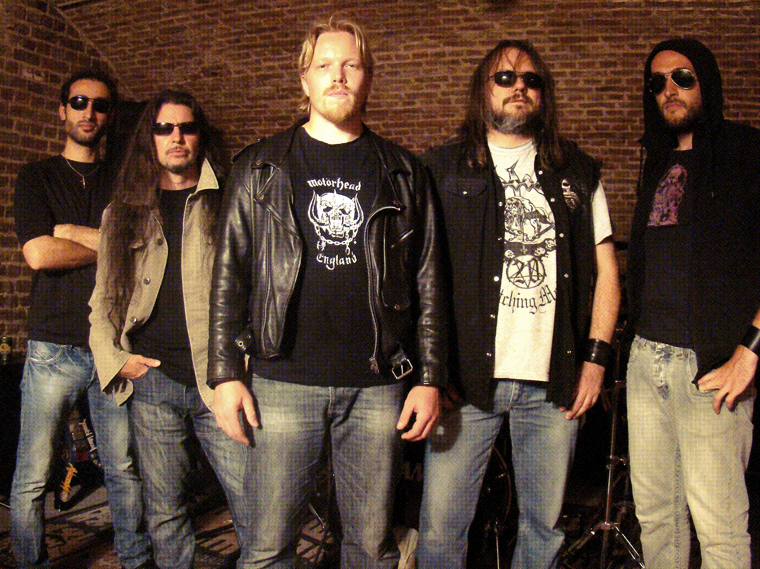
- Trouble Agency Anno 2013

Background information
- Origin: Brussels, Belgium
- Genres: Thrash metal, heavy metal
- Years active: 1993–present
- Label: Independent
- Members: Didier Van Coppenolle; Larry Van De Rostyne; De Bock François; Simon Mouawad; Kevin Nolis
- Website: http://www.troubleagency.be/

Trouble Agency is a Belgian thrash metal band from Brussels, formed in 1993. Founding members Didier Van Coppenolle (guitarist) and Bart Brion (drummer) decided to join forces, writing their first songs, embracing a unique blend of groovy Thrash Metal with Hard Core elements. The band is considered as one of the last of its generation still active in Belgium. Trouble Agency was born in the ashes of 1980s thrash metal bands Cyclone and Decadence.

== Biography ==
=== Formation and early career (1993–2008) ===
The original Trouble Agency lineup consisted of Didier Van Coppenolle (ex-Brain Cancer and Necrosis), Bart Brion (ex-Decadence]) with Kalle Vanlint (ex-Cyclone & Decadence) on guitars, bassist Alain Fabry (ex-Necrosis), and Serge Van Bossele on vocals. The band would record ‘Alone’(1996) and ‘Angry’(1998), their first two demos, joined by Pascal Haneuse on drums and Didier Meeus on vocals.

Trouble Agency then releases a first studio demo called Bite Into Life (2002), which was recorded and produced by Xavier Carrion (ex-Cyclone & Channel Zero) and features Jamal Obeidat on drums.

Larry Van De Rostyne (ex-Decadence) joins the band on lead guitars in 2003. This lineup was the longest to last and also released its first studio album, Moneycracy (2006).

=== Transition (2008–2012) ===
The band's commitment to self-releasing their albums and remaining independent from any local or major labels, hadn't allowed any popular breakthrough of their first releases, despite being well received by the public.

Jamal Obeidat's departure from the band in 2008 would open a breach in the lineup, as bassist Alain Fabry and singer Didier Meeus would leave Trouble Agency shortly after.

Though Trouble Agency never broke up, the most important lineup changes, occurring around 2010, would not affect the band's inspiration or style. Trouble Agency recruited drummer François De Bock (ex- Breathstealer) and as a three-piece, released the totally self-recorded demo LP The Last Shot (2011) with mastermind Didier Van Coppenolle assuming rhythmic guitars as well as vocals and Larry Van De Rostyne on both lead guitars and bass.

=== New era (2012–present) ===
The addition of Simon Mouawad on bass put Trouble Agency back on the tracks, allowing them to bounce back and recruit long time friend Kevin Nolis (ex- Breathstealer and Wasted Years) on vocals during early 2013. The band announced to be working on the release of a studio recording late 2013.

== Acknowledgement ==
Trouble Agency's music was described as being similar to crossover and thrash metal acts Sacred Reich, D.R.I., Destruction and Annihilator by the Dutch Aardschok Magazine and the French Metallian Magazine. Through the years Trouble Agency has shared stages with acts as Exodus, Destruction, Immortal, Anvil, Hyades, Onslaught and Paradox and has headlined the Metal Blast festival held at the Botanique in Brussels. They played at Wacken Open Air 2014's edition.

== Discography ==
- Alone (1996)
- Angry (1998)
- Bite Into Life (2002)
- Moneycracy (2006)
- The Last Shot (2013)
- Suspected (2017)

== Members ==
Current members

- Didier Van Coppenolle (Rhythmic Guitars)
- Larry Van De Rostyne (Lead Guitars)
- François De Bock (Drums)
- Simon Mouawad (Bass)
- Kevin Nolis (Vocals)

Former members

- Alain Fabry (Bass) (1993–2011)
- Bart Brion (Drums) (1993–1995)
- Kalle Vanlint (Guitars) (1993–2003)
- Serge Van Bossele (Vocals) (1993–1995)
- Pascal Haneuse (Drums) (1995–1998)
- Didier Meeus (Vocals) (1995–2011)
- Jamal Obeidat (Drums) (1999–2008)
- Pablos Alvarez (Bass) (2011)
