= My American Heart =

American rock band

- Origin: San Diego, California, United States
- Genres: Alternative rock; pop punk; indie rock; emo
- Years active: 2001-2009, 2017-present
- Label: Warcon (2005-2009)
- Past members: Larry Soliman; Jesse Barrera; Dustin Hook; Jake Kalb; Nick Logan; Matthew VanGasbeck; Steven Oira; Jeremy Mendez; Brian Warren; Clint Delgado; Oscar Gomez

My American Heart is an American rock band from San Diego, California, formed in 2001. Originally named No Way Out, the band released two studio albums through Warcon Enterprises and toured the world before disbanding in late 2009. They reunited in 2017.

== History ==
My American Heart gained local fame from many local SoCal venues from which they played. Due to legal troubles concerning their name, the band changed their name from No Way Out to My American Heart to reflect the ethnic and national duality the original members identified with. The band made their first big break winning the Ernie Ball Battle Of The Bands. As popularity grew, the band was pressured to play at larger venues farther from home, causing Clint Delgado to leave the band to focus on his education. The band played the Taste of Chaos tour in 2005 with a four-piece. Shortly after the tour the band recorded the full-length album The Meaning in Makeup with producer Sal Villanueva released on Kevin Lyman's label, Warcon, in fall 2005. While on the Warped Tour, the band picked up bassist Dustin Hook.

During the summer of 2006, the band's original guitarist, Jeremy Mendez, left the band. My American Heart picked up guitarist Matt "Spud" VanGasbeck (formerly of Downtown Singapore) before heading out on their last tour before they went into the studio to record "Hiding Inside the Horrible Weather" with producer James Paul Wisner.

It was announced on the Soundwave (Australian music festival) tour that Steve Oira would leave the band after tour due to a mutual agreement. Jake Kalb (ex-The Fold/New Atlantic/The Suicide Pact) replaced him on drums.

My American Heart announced on a MySpace page that they were working on a new album. On April 14, 2008, Jesse Barrera announced on his website (jessebarrera.com) that they were no longer on Warcon Records, saying "The label that we were on for four years just folded and now we're currently in the most interesting legal situation ever, which I won't get into".

In early July 2009, Jesse Barrera announced on his website that he was leaving My American Heart. In October 2009, it was announced through members of the band that they would be disbanding following a few final shows. In early October 2009, Jesse Barrera made four demo tracks available on his website, entitled "Unravel", "Pain", "Lost Inside Of You", and "Circa". The songs had been intended for their third studio album that may never be released. Two more demos were later released, titled "Heart Attack" and "Shine Your Light", which may have also been intended for their third studio album.

My American Heart played two reunion shows on February 3 and 4, 2012, at The Epicentre in San Diego and Chain Reaction in Anaheim, respectively.

On August 1, 2017, it was announced that, in honor of the ten-year anniversary of Hiding Inside The Horrible Weather, My American Heart would be reuniting.

== Discography ==
=== No Way Out ===
- The Courtesy Of Stars (EP) – 2002
- Certainty Kills (EP) – 2003

=== My American Heart ===
- My American Heart (EP) – 2004
- The Meaning in Makeup – 2005
- Hiding Inside the Horrible Weather – 2007
- Alder Masters (EP) – 2009
- My American Heart – 2019

=== Compilation appearances ===
- Punk the Clock Vol. 1 – 2004 – Contributed "The Ruins We Hold:
- Taste of Chaos – 2005 – Contributed "White Lines"
- Taste of Christmas – 2005 – Contributed "The First Noel"
- Punk Goes Crunk – 2008 – Contributed a cover of 2Pac's "California Love"

== Former members ==
- Larry Soliman
- Jesse Barrera
- Dustin Hook
- Jake Kalb
- Nick Logan
- Matthew VanGasbeck
- Steven Oira
- Jeremy Mendez
- Brian Warren
- Clint Delgado

== Side projects ==
After announcing his departure from the band, guitarist Jesse Barrera continued work on his eponymous acoustic pop project. On March 24, 2010, he independently released his debut solo album titled Love In Technicolor.

Dustin Hook is currently a full-time touring bassist for country act Dan + Shay, which also reunited with his former Transition bandmate Dan Smyers.
