= Hiding Inside the Horrible Weather =

Studio album by My American Heart
- Released: June 26, 2007
- Genres: Emo, indie rock, alternative rock
- Length: 40:20
- Label: Warcon
- Producer: James Paul Wisner

My American Heart chronology
The Meaning in Makeup (2005)	Hiding Inside the Horrible Weather (2007)

Hiding Inside the Horrible Weather is My American Heart's second and final album, released on June 26, 2007, by Warcon Records. The album was produced by James Paul Wisner, and the artwork was designed by Don Clark of Invisible Creature. Two music videos for the album's single "The Shake (Awful Feeling)" were released.

== Critical reception ==
Professional ratings
Review scores
Source	Rating
AllMusic	4.5/5 stars
NME	6/10
Sputnik Music	3/5

Mike Sterry of NME wrote that My American Heart "play what was considered pop-emo about five years ago, but their trick is to draw a bit of influence from the likes of Yeah Yeah Yeahs and Kings of Leon" and that "Hiding... has incredible 10-second intros and great ideas, but feels less than the sum of its parts." AllMusic's Jo-Ann Greene said the album is "quite a musical step forward" from the band's previous release, The Meaning in Makeup. Greene said "Boys! Grab Your Guns" had "a hook big enough to raise the Titanic" and that the album was "awash in strong melodies and irrepressible choruses" and was "sure to resonate for years to come".

An "emeritus" reviewer with the username "Kiran" on Sputnikmusic said "though My American Heart lacks originality in an already overcrowded pop rock scene, the well crafted and catchy melodic songs make for a memorable follow-up album from the San Diego outfit". Kiran complimented the first half of the album as "radio-friendly and memorable", but said this promising start was "unfortunately let down by the weak ending of the album" and that the work "leaves room for improvement on their next release". Kiran summed up by saying "It's not original, it's not innovative, it's not musically complex, but these guys have the potential to master the art of creating memorable songs."

== Track listing ==
No.	Title	Length
1.	"Boys! Grab Your Guns"	3:37
2.	"Speak Low If You Speak Love"	3:08
3.	"The Shake (Awful Feeling)"	3:29
4.	"Tired & Uninspired"	3:44
5.	"Hiding Inside the Horrible Weather"	3:48
6.	"The Innocent Letter"	3:37
7.	"There Are More Frightening Things..."	3:46
8.	"Dangerous"	4:45
9.	"Moving On"	3:33
10.	"Fantasy"	3:49
11.	"All My Friends"	3:08

== Singles ==
In May 2007, My American Heart filmed a music video for lead single "The Shake (Awful Feeling)" with director Travis Kopach, produced by Dignity & Shame/Refused TV. This video was released in June 2007. In December 2007, the band shot a second music video for "The Shake (Awful Feeling)" with director Hal Randall which was released in March 2008.

== Charts ==
Chart (2007)	Peak position
US Top Heatseekers (Billboard)	28
