= NSAA =

NSAA may refer to:

- National State Auditors Association
- Nebraska School Activities Association
- North Star Athletic Association, a former National Association of Intercollegiate Athletics conference
- Nonsteroidal antiandrogen
- Non-standard amino acids: non-proteinogenic amino acids used for an expanded genetic code
- The New School for the Arts and Academics
