= The SmashUp =

- Origin: New York City, New York, USA
- Genres: Post-hardcore, punk rock
- Years active: 2001–present
- Labels: Warcon Enterprises, Eulogy, Glasstone Records
- Members: Sean Cuthbert; Vin Alfieri; VinnyG; Joshua Brain Jaffe; Bret D'Louhy

The Smashup are a post-hardcore / punk rock band from Brooklyn, New York. They formed in 2001.

They released their self-titled debut EP in 2004 and their first studio album "Being and Becoming" in 2005, featuring songs such as "Never Going To Kill Us", "No Name", and "Effigy." The song "Effigy" was featured on the Saw III soundtrack and the song "Never Going to Kill Us" on the Feast soundtrack.

In 2010 the band signed with Eulogy Recordings and released their second album through the label in March of that year.

The band signed to Glasstone Records for the UK release of their album The Sea and the Serpents Beneath.

== Line up ==
=== Current members ===
- Sean Cuthbert - Vocals
- Vin Alfieri - Guitar/Vocals
- Vinny G - Guitar
- Joshua Brain Jaffe - Bass
- Bret D'Louhy- Drums

=== Previous Members ===
- Watt White - Vocals
- Rich Liegey - Bass
- Ant Cee - Drums

== Tour information ==
In 2006, they toured alongside Megadeth, Lamb of God and others as a second stage act in Dave Mustaine's Gigantour 2006. They also toured during Vans Warped Tour and the 2006 Taste of Chaos tour.

== Discography ==
=== Studio albums ===
- 2005: Untreatable (UK release) – Mighty Atom
- 2005: Being and Becoming – Warcon
- 2010: The Sea and the Serpents Beneath – Eulogy
- 2010: The Sea and the Serpents Beneath (UK/EU release) – Glasstone Records

=== EPs ===
- 2004: The Smashup EP
