= Wrong Side of Town =

2010 film by David DeFalco

- Film poster
- Directed by: David DeFalco
- Written by: David DeFalco
- Produced by: David DeFalco; Jason Hewitt; Carsten H.W. Lorenz
- Starring: Dave Bautista; Rob Van Dam; Ja Rule; Omarion
- Cinematography: Thomas Lembcke
- Edited by: Andrew Drazek; Ezra Gould; Donald Ray Washington
- Music by: Jim Kaufman
- Production company: Films in Motion
- Distributed by: Grindstone Entertainment Group
- Release date: February 23, 2010
- Running time: 88 minutes
- Country: United States
- Language: English
- Budget: $870,000

Wrong Side of Town is a 2010 American action film written, produced and directed by David DeFalco, scored by Jim Kaufman, and starring Dave Bautista and Rob Van Dam. The film was released direct-to-DVD in the United States on February 23, 2010.

== Plot ==
Bobby Kalinowski, a former Navy Seal, enjoys a peaceful life as a landscape architect in Louisiana with his family. After receiving an invitation from new neighbors Clay Freeman and Elise Freeman, they go out for a night on the town to a famous club. The evening soon takes a turn for the worse when Bobby gets into a conflict with one of the club owners, named Ethan Bordas. In the middle of the conflict, Ethan accidentally falls and is stabbed by his own knife, while fighting with Bobby, who was defending his wife.

Seeking revenge, Ethan's father Seth Bordas, previously thought to be his older brother, puts a $100,000 bounty on Bobby's head. Also making matters difficult, Bobby is unable to receive help from the law, for Seth has Clay Freeman, and a corrupt police sergeant, working for him. Now Bobby must survive and escape Louisiana while being hunted by criminals, corrupt law, and many others in the city. To protect his family and neighbors, Bobby decides to separate himself from them and goes to his Navy Seal colleague Big Ronnie (or known as B.R.) for help. B.R. initially refuses, deciding to take the bounty, but later changes his mind and helps Bobby. Seth targets Bobby’s family and kidnaps his 16-year-old daughter Brianna. However, Bobby ends up fighting and killing Seth and his henchmen with B.R.'s help, and rescues his daughter.

== Cast ==
- Rob Van Dam as Bobby Kalinowski
- Dave Bautista as Ronnie "Big Ronnie" / B.R.
- Lara Grice as Dawn Kalinowski
- Edrick Browne as Clay Freeman
- Ava Santana as Elise Freeman
- Stormy Daniels as "Stormy"
- Randal Reeder as "Trouble"
- Jerry Katz as Seth Bordas
- Louis Herthum as Briggs
- Brooke Frost as Brianna Kalinowski
- Ja Rule a.k.a. Jeffrey Atkins as "Razor"
- Nelson Frazier, Jr. as "Animal"
- Damon Lipari as Nicky
- Scott Schwartz as Deacon
- David DeFalco as "Demon"
- Marrese Crump as Markus
- Omarion a.k.a. Omari Grandberry as "Stash"
- Quess a.k.a. Brian Wakefield as "Dawg"
- Ross Britz as Ethan Bordas
- "Big Dog" Ramar Jenkins as "Big Dog"
- Carsten H.W. Lorenz as Cab Driver
- Anthony M. Frederick as Detective Hernandez
- Gabriela Ostos as Abusive Woman
- J. Omar Castro as Cop

== Production ==
The film is set and filmed at Baton Rouge, Louisiana and Los Angeles, California on January 18 and February 21, 2009.

== Home media ==
On February 23, 2010, DVD was released by Lionsgate in the United States in Region 1. DVD was released in Region 2 in the United Kingdom on 15 March 2010, it was distributed by Entertainment One.

== Critical response ==
R.L. Shaffer of IGN scored the film 2/10, writing, "Alas, Wrong Side of Town gets everything wrong. The producers cast a bunch of wrestlers who can't act and they gave them unbelievable dialogue and stupid characters. It's no wonder their performances are terrible. No one is guided in the right direction, and the entire production feels like a high school-produced cheapie that everyone's ashamed they made."

Dave Baustia has claimed himself that his acting in this movie was terrible and he felt embarrassed after finishing the film. Because of this, it made him realize he either had to really work on his acting or he will end up just making bad straight to DVD action movies.
