= Elias Mallin =

American musician (born 1981)

- Born: Elijah Mallin; March 23, 1981 (age 45); Phoenix, Arizona, United States
- Genres: Metal, Progressive rock, alternative rock,
- Occupations: Musician, songwriter
- Instruments: drums, percussion
- Labels: Roadrunner Records, OSR/Universal Records, Atlantic Records, Octone Records, RCA Records, Interscope Records, Columbia Records, Republic Records
- Formerly of: Opiate for the Masses, Kill Hannah
- Website: killhannah.com My Darling Murder

Elias Mallin (born March 23, 1981, Phoenix, Arizona, United States) is an American musician, who played drums for metal/post-hardcore band Opiate for the Masses from 1999 until 2005, a band which he had formed with fellow students of the New School for the Arts and Academics. He was one of the founding members of My Darling Murder, a metal band formed with friends Andy Gerold (former touring bassist for Marilyn Manson) and Tim Kelleher (former touring bassist for Thirty Seconds to Mars).

My Darling Murder broke up in 2006, according to a statement released by the band itself, and in the fall of that year, Mallin joined Kill Hannah on the road as their touring drummer. He has since mid-2007 been featured in interviews, photo shoots, and press as a full member of Kill Hannah. Although a full-time member in Kill Hannah, Mallin has also been performing as the live drummer for Kesha since her Spring 2010 appearance on Saturday Night Live. He also performed as the hired gun in Hollywood Undead from late 2009–2010 before joining Kesha forever.

Mallin, Gerold, and Kelleher reformed My Darling Murder, with singer Jared Woosely. They recorded an EP with producer Sean Beavan in early 2011. The Ep was never officially released.

In 2012 Mallin joined platinum selling rock band Filter for a short stint along with super group Fear and the Nervous System (led by James "Munky" Schaffer from Korn). Elias returned to Kesha in late 2012.

After Kesha's tour cycle for the Warrior album ended Mallin joined platinum selling pop duo MKTO in February 2014 while also recording drums for the new Hollywood Undead album record (set for release in 2015 on Interscope Records).

In 2015 and 2016 he continued playing with Kesha and MKTO while also playing/touring with Andrew Watt, Hayley Kiyoko, and others.

In 2017 Mallin currently plays for Noah Cyrus and Julia Michaels and is expected to continue touring with Kesha.

== Drum kit ==
Mallin plays a Tama kit. He has stated he was obsessed with playing a Tama kit when growing up. Currently on the road with Ke$ha, Elias uses a hybrid kit consisting of his Tama drums and Roland trigger pads. While on tour with Kill Hannah, Hollywood Undead, My Darling Murder, and any other act just a 5-piece Tama B/B kit is used; 10", 12", 16" toms, 22" bass drum, and 14" Bubinga or B/B snare. Elias sponsors Tama drums, Paiste cymbals, Vic Firth drum sticks, and Evans drum heads.

== Influences ==
Elias experimented with many drumming styles, including fusion, afro Cuban, and metal. He has cited Tool and especially drummer Danny Carey as strong influences on his playing style amongst Dave Elitch, Steve Gadd, and Chris Coleman.

== Television appearances ==
Elias has performed on Saturday Night Live, MTV EMAs, X Factor, American Idol, Conan O'Brien, "MTV Movie Awards", "Radio Disney Music Awards", Jimmy Kimmel Live!, Carson Daly, MTV Japanese VMAs, The Today Show, "The Tonight Show with Jimmy Fallon", "The Billboard Awards", "Late Night With Jimmy Fallon", "Good Morning America", "The View", "Live With Kelly And Michael", "Kid's Choice Awards", "MTV World Stage", Steven's Untitled Rock Show on FUSE, amongst many other award shows, late night television (national and international), and specialty shows for MTV2, FUSE, MTVU and other national and international television programs.
