= Opiate for the Masses =

American rock band

- Origin: Los Angeles, California, USA
- Genres: Alternative metal, gothic metal, industrial metal
- Years active: 1999–2009
- Labels: Warcon, Century Media
- Past members: Ron Underwood; Dustin Lyon; Elias Mallin; Ryan Head; Seven Antonopoulos; Anna K. Andy Gerald; Jim Kaufman

Opiate for the Masses was an American alternative metal band from Los Angeles, California in 1999.

== History ==
Opiate for the Masses was founded in 1999 by singer Ron Underwood, drummer Elias Mallin, guitarist/keyboardist Jim Kaufman and guitarist Dustin Lyon. The group's name is an alteration of Karl Marx's famous aphorism, "Religion is the opium of the people". Opiate for the Masses self-released a demo album entitled New Machines and the Wasted Life in 2000. In 2005, the band signed with Warcon Enterprises and issued the album The Spore. By this time the group had added Seven Antonopoulos on drums and Anna K. (of Drain STH) on bass. The group played the Taste of Chaos tour and opened for Static-X, Avenged Sevenfold, My Chemical Romance and Disturbed on tour. On February 4, 2008, the group signed with Century Media Records and released the album Manifesto. The group followed the release of Manifesto by touring with Filter. In 2009, the group disbanded.

== Original members ==
- Ron Underwood – vocals
- Elias Mallin – drums
- Dustin Lyon – guitars
- Ryan Head – bass
- Jim Kaufman – keyboards, guitar

== Touring members ==
- Seven Antonopoulos – drums
- Anna K. – bass

== Discography ==
Studio albums

- The Spore (2005)
- Manifesto (2008)

EPs

- Seven (2001)
- Goodbye (2003)

Demo albums

- New Machines and the Wasted Life (2000)

== Reunion ==
In 2010, original Opiate for the Masses members Ron Underwood, Elias Mallin, Dustin Lyon, Ryan Head and guitarist Andy Gerold played a reunion show to a sold-out crowd in Tempe, Arizona.
