= Non Plus Ultra: 1989–1999 =

Non Plus Ultra: 1989-1999

Compilation album by Atrocity
- Released: 2 August 1999
- Genre: Industrial music, gothic metal
- Label: Massacre

Atrocity chronology
Werk 80 (1997)	Non Plus Ultra: 1989-1999 (1999)	Gemini (2000)

Non Plus Ultra: 1989–1999 is a compilation album by German industrial gothic metal band Atrocity, released in 1999 featuring songs from previous albums, includes some rare / unreleased tracks and all the music videos that had been released until that point.

== History ==
Apart from a couple of unreleased tracks, the listing is set out in reverse chronological order (newer songs first working its way back to the first album).

== Track listing ==
Disc one

1. "Shake Your Head"
2. "Tainted Love" – (Gloria Jones cover)
3. "Rage Hard" – (Frankie Goes to Hollywood cover)
4. "Shout" – (Tears for Fears cover)
5. "Die Deutschmaschine" – (And One cover)
6. "Siehst du mich im Licht?"
7. "Blue Moon"
8. "Deliverance (Das Ich remix version)"
9. "Gottes Tod"
10. "Land Beyond The Forest"
11. "Calling The Rain"
12. "Die Liebe (featuring Das Ich)"
13. "Die Todgeweihten"

Also contains (as CD-Rom material) videos for the following:

1. "Die Liebe" (featuring Das Ich)
2. "Calling the Rain"
3. "The Great Commandment" (Camouflage cover)
4. "Shout" (Tears for Fears cover)

Disc two

1. "Willenskraft"
2. "Love is Dead"
3. "We Are Degeneration"
4. "Trial"
5. "Blut"
6. "Leichenfeier"
7. "Necropolis"
8. "Todessehnsucht"
9. "Godless Years"
10. "Fatal Step"
11. "Hallucinations"
12. "Blue Blood [1996 version]"
13. "Procreation (Of The Wicked)" – (Celtic Frost cover)

Also contains (as CD-Rom material) videos for the following:

1. "Blut"
2. "Love Is Dead"
3. "Miss Directed"
