= Freaks of Nature (Drain STH album) =

Studio album by Drain sth
- Released: 29 June 1999
- Recorded: Decibel, Soundtrade, First Take, Atlantis, MVG and Cherion Studios, Sweden; 1998-1999
- Genres: Alternative metal; nu metal
- Length: 42:55
- Labels: MVG; The Enclave
- Producers: Drain STH; Ulf "Sank" Sandqvist

Drain sth chronology
Horror Wrestling (1996)	Freaks of Nature (1999)

Professional ratings
Review scores
Source	Rating
AllMusic	4.5/5 stars
Rolling Stone	3.5/5 stars

Freaks of Nature is the second and final studio album by Swedish rock band Drain STH, released on 29 June 1999.

== Track listing ==
No.	Title	Lyrics	Music	Length
1.	"Enter My Mind"	Martina Axén, Maria Sjöholm	Anna Kjellberg, Axén	3.13
2.	"Alive"	Axén, Sjöholm	Kjellberg, Axén	3:35
3.	"Simon Says"	Sjöholm, Axén, Herbie Crichlow	Max Martin, Axén	4:10
4.	"I Wish..."	Axén	Flavia Canel, Axén	4:40
5.	"Black"	Axén, Sjöholm	Tony Iommi, Axén, Kjellberg	4:07
6.	"Crave"	Axén	Kjellberg, Axén	4:21
7.	"The Bubble Song"	Axén, Sjöholm	Canel, Kjellberg, Axén	3:28
8.	"Right Through You"	Sjöholm, Martin	Martin	4:04
9.	"Leech"	Axén, Sjöholm	Canel, Axén	4:14
10.	"Get Inside"	Sjöholm, Axén	Canel, Axén, Kjellberg	3:23
11.	"I Will Follow"	Axén, Sjöholm, Kjellberg	Kjellberg	3:40

Drain STH also recorded a new song that was included on Ozzfest Rock Pile Sampler 1999. The song was called "Down".

== Personnel ==
=== Band members ===
- Maria Sjöholm - vocals
- Flavia Canel - guitar
- Anna Kjellberg - bass
- Martina Axén - drums, backing vocals

=== Additional musicians ===
- Nico Elgstrand - acoustic guitar
- Stefan Brisland-Ferner - strings on "I Wish ..."
- Fleshquartet - strings on "I Will Follow"
- Herbie Crichlow - vocals on "Simon Says"
- Tony Iommi - Guitar on "Black"

=== Production ===
- Ulf "Sank" Sandqvist - producer, arranger, engineer, loops and programming
- Andrew Scarth - additional production, engineer
- Max Martin - producer and arranger on "Simon Says", vocals arrangements on "Simon Says" and "Right Through You"
- Stefan Glaumann - mixing
- George Marino - mastering
