= The Spore =

Studio album by Opiate for the Masses
- Released: April 26, 2005
- Recorded: El Dorado Studios
- Genre: Post-hardcore, industrial metal, alternative metal, nu metal
- Length: 41:45
- Label: Warcon Enterprises
- Producer: Jim Kaufman

Opiate for the Masses chronology
Goodbye (2002)	The Spore (2005)	Manifesto (2008)

Professional ratings
Review scores
Source	Rating
Sputnikmusic	4/5 stars

The Spore is Opiate for the Masses's second full-length album, released on April 26, 2005, by Jim Kaufman's own Voodoo Records. The CD is sold with a Warcon DVD including videos from Opiate for the Masses, Eighteen Visions, Queens of the Stone Age, Drowning Pool, El Pus, Stutterfly and Bleed The Dream. There is also a collection of movie trailers, concert clips, video game teasers and a five-track demo by Shadows Fall.

== Track listing ==
1. "Introduction"
2. "Can't Feel"
3. "Up To Me"
4. "Drown"
5. "Clean"
6. "Step Up"
7. "Intermission"
8. "Heaven"
9. "Now"
10. "Transparency"
11. "Dig It Up"
12. "Interlude #2"
13. "Nothing Left"
14. "The End"
