= Horror Wrestling =

Studio album by Drain STH
- Released: 5 June 1996
- Recorded: Decibel Studio in Stockholm, Sweden
- Genre: Alternative metal; grunge
- Length: 56:58
- Label: MVG
- Producer: Drain STH; Adam Kviman

Drain STH chronology
Serve the Shame (1993)	Horror Wrestling (1996)	Freaks of Nature (1999)

Professional ratings
Review scores
Source	Rating
Allmusic	link
Entertainment Weekly	B− link

Horror Wrestling is the debut studio album by Swedish rock band Drain STH, released on 5 June 1996.

== Track listing ==
1. "I Don't Mind" (lyrics: Sjöholm; music: Drain STH) 3:43
2. "Smile" (lyrics: Sjöholm; music: Axén, Kjellberg) 4:14
3. "Serve the Shame" (lyrics & music: Sjöholm) 3:57
4. "Mirror's Eyes" (mislabeled as "Mirror's Smile" on the back of the 1998 album) (lyrics: Sjöholm; music: Drain STH) 3:57
5. "Someone" (lyrics: Axén; music: Axén, Kjellberg) 4:24
6. "Crucified" (lyrics: Axén; music: Axén, Canel) 4:09
7. "Stench" (lyrics: Axén; music: Axén, Canel) 4:59
8. "Crack the Liar's Smile" (lyrics: Sjöholm; music: Kjellberg) 4:01
9. "Klotera" (lyrics: Axén; music: Axén, Canel, Kjellberg) 3:46
10. "Mind Over Body" (lyrics: Axén; music: Axén, Canel) 5:38
11. "Unforgiving Hours" (lyrics: Axén; music: Axén, Kjellberg) 4:53
12. "Unreal" (lyrics: Axén; music: Axén, Kjellberg) 4:48

The album was reissued in 1998 with an orange-tinted cover and three bonus tracks:

- "(So I Will Burn) Alone" (lyrics: Axén; music: Axén, Canel, Kjellberg) 4:29
- "Serve the Shame (Acoustic)" (lyrics & music: Sjöholm) 3:35
- "Ace of Spades" (Lemmy, Phil Taylor, Eddie Clarke) 5:02

The Crack the Liar's Smile single included a bonus track called "Without Eyes". It was recorded during the Horror Wrestling sessions, but had not previously been released.

A 2-track single for "Serve the Shame" was also released. This included the acoustic version heard on the reissued of Horror Wrestling, as well as an unplugged version of the track.

== Personnel ==
- Maria Sjöholm: vocals
- Flavia Canel: guitar
- Anna Kjellberg: bass
- Martina Axén: drums, backing vocals

Additional Personnel:

- Nico Elgstrand: acoustic guitar on "Crack the Liar's Smile," "Mirror's Eyes," and "Unforgiving Hours"
- Sebastian Öberg: cello on "I Don't Mind," "Mind Over Body," "Unforgiving Hours" and "Unreal"
- Orjan Örnkloo: samples on "I Don't Mind"
