= Tim Kelleher (musician) =

American musician (born 1980)

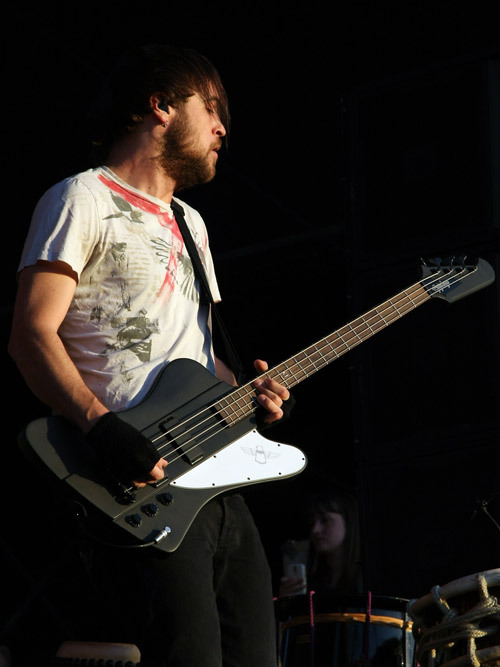
- Kelleher performing with Thirty Seconds to Mars in Fontana, California (October 2010)

Background information
- Born: Timothy Kelleher; 4 October 1980 (age 45); Phoenix, Arizona, United States
- Genres: Alternative rock
- Occupation: Musician
- Instruments: Bass; guitar; keyboards
- Years active: 2004–present

Timothy Kelleher (born October 4, 1980) is an American musician best known for touring with the American rock band Thirty Seconds to Mars from 2007 to 2011, and most recently was a member of the American rock band Filter from 2013 to 2015. He was one of the founding members of My Darling Murder, a metal band formed with friends Andy Gerold and Elias Mallin. Kelleher has also worked with Fear and the Nervous System, 8mm and Wired All Wrong.

== Early life ==
Tim Kelleher was born October 4, 1980, in Phoenix, Arizona. Kelleher attended Chaparral High School in Scottsdale, Arizona, and honed in on his craft while writing music and playing in numerous rock and industrial bands. His influences as a bassist include Billy Gould, Cliff Burton, Rex Brown, and Paul D'Amour.

== Music career ==
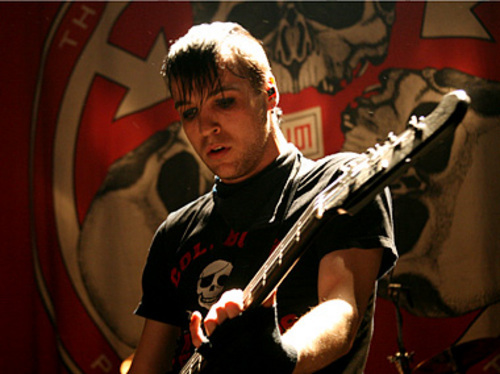
Kelleher in 2008

Kelleher founded My Darling Murder in 2004 with guitarist Andy Gerold, drummer Elias Mallin, and singer Chris Ruoff. The band's influences include Faith No More, Nine Inch Nails, Radiohead, Tool, and Muse.

My Darling Murder quickly gained local notoriety and eventually would share the stage with bands like Greeley Estates, Scary Kids Scaring Kids, Smile Empty Soul, and Blindside. They would also go on to re-release their extended play with five additional tracks before a brief tour with Thirty Seconds to Mars and Seether.

Just as more of the music industry started to take notice of the band, singer Ruoff surprisingly quit the band prematurely. After his departure, the remaining members worked on several projects.

Kelleher was involved in cooperation with Thirty Seconds to Mars since former bassist Matt Wachter left the band in 2007 to join Angels & Airwaves whose schedule was less hectic, allowing him more time for his family. Kelleher was playing bass guitar, keyboards and occasionally rhythm guitar.

On December 31, 2010 Kelleher announced that he was leaving Thirty Seconds to Mars to work on his own music with My Darling Murder. However, he performed with Thirty Seconds to Mars on selected dates in 2011.

Kelleher, Andy Gerold, and Elias Mallin reformed My Darling Murder in 2010 with singer Jared Woosely. They recorded an extended play with producer Sean Beavan in early 2011. Kelleher has also worked with Fear and the Nervous System, 8mm, and Wired All Wrong. He also played bass guitar for Rock of Ages. In October 2013, Kelleher joined American rock band Filter.
