= Dark Reel =

- Directed by: Josh Eisenstadt
- Written by: Aaron Pope; Josh Eisenstadt
- Produced by: Amy Dowdle; John Dowdle; David Forline; Jenapher Forline; Jesse Pate
- Starring: Tiffany Shepis; Lance Henriksen; Edward Furlong; Agung Bagus; Tony Snegoff; Barry Ford; Dragon Dronet; Mercedes McNab; Alexandra Holden; Tony Todd; Blanca Balnco; Kevin Ryder; Amy Dowde; Ron Underwood
- Cinematography: Charies Rose
- Edited by: Rebecca Grace
- Music by: Jim Kaufman
- Distributed by: Northstar Associates
- Release date: 2008
- Running time: 108 minutes
- Language: English

Dark Reel is a 2008 horror starring Tiffany Shepis, Edward Furlong, Agung Bagus, Tony Snegoff, Mercedes McNab, Alexandra Holden, Barry Ford, Tony Todd and Lance Henriksen and directed by Josh Eisenstadt.

== Plot ==
After his girlfriend leaves him, lonely horror movie buff Adam Waltz moves to Los Angeles to be closer to her. There he lands a walk-on role in studio chief Connor Pritchett's latest cinematic schlockfest, Pirate Wench. One night, a killer starts stalking the set, and before long bodies are piling up. On the downside, it wreaks havoc with the film's budget. On the upside, Adam's part keeps getting bigger and bigger. With ace police detectives Shields and LaRue on the case, everyone hopes the mystery will be solved quickly. But when Adam begins seeing the ghost of an actress who died fifty years ago, there may be more to this serial killing spree than a psycho with a taste for torture.

== Cast ==
- Edward Furlong as Adam Waltz
- Lance Henriksen as Connor Pitchett
- Tracey Walter as Roy White
- Tiffany Shepis as Cassie Blue
- Rena Riffel as Detective LaRue
- Jeffrey Vincent Parise as Derek Deeds
- Mercedes McNab as Tara Leslie
- Brooke Lyons as Tanya Kismen
- Alexandra Holden as Scarlett May
- Tony Todd as Detective Shields
- Emmanuel Xuereb as Harris Briggs
- Jake Grace as Rhett Johnson
- Agung Bagus as Children
- Matt Bushell as Bandana Man
- Tony Snegoff as Shadow Killer
- Jade Tailor as Laura
- Ron Underwood as Party Guest 2
- Jim Kaufman as Band Performer
- Christina Desiere as Bikini Girl
- Eric D. Altaman as Bartender
- Rebeka Montoya as 2nd AC
- Church as Pirate Guard
- Rouhi Savoji as Pirate Wench
- Jacey Margolis as Cindy

== Reception ==
Bill Gibron of DVD Talk said, "a lot of what this film has to offer is worth a look. It's not classic, but it's not crap either."
