= Gigantour =

Traveling heavy metal music festival

- Tour by Megadeth (See: full listing)
- The Gigantour 2005 web banner, before Anthrax was announced to join the festival
- Dates: July 21 – September 11, 2005; September 6 – October 24, 2006; November 10, 2007 – May 22, 2008; January – March 2012; July - August 2013
- Legs: 7

Gigantour was a sporadically organized traveling heavy metal music festival organized by Dave Mustaine of Megadeth. The tour was founded in 2005 with dates across North America (see also Gigantour 2005), and the 2006 and 2007 line-ups also traveled to Australia. The bands appearing at the festival were chosen by Mustaine. The tour was an alternative to tours such as Ozzfest. The name "Gigantour" was inspired by the classic 1960s anime Gigantor, of which Mustaine is a fan. The last Gigantour took place in 2013.

== The Festival ==
The lineup of the inaugural Gigantour was composed of bands that Dave Mustaine particularly enjoyed touring with in the past. Mustaine invited Dream Theater, Nevermore and Overkill. The subsequent editions of Gigantour also featured Mustaine's personal choices, such as Anthrax, The Dillinger Escape Plan, and Fear Factory.

== Festival album ==
A live album culled from Gigantour festival shows in Montreal (September 2, 2005) and Vancouver (September 9, 2005) was released on CD on August 22, 2006, and on DVD on September 5, 2006. The album has performances by Megadeth, Dream Theater, Anthrax, Fear Factory, Life of Agony, Nevermore, Dry Kill Logic, Symphony X and Bobaflex.

== Gigantour 2: North America (2006) ==
=== Line-up ===
==== Main stage ====
Megadeth, Lamb of God, Opeth, Arch Enemy

==== Second stage ====
Overkill, Into Eternity, Sanctity, The SmashUp

=== Tour dates ===
Date	City	Country	Venue
September 6, 2006	Nampa, Idaho	United States	Idaho Center
September 8, 2006	Oakland, California	United States	RingCentral Coliseum
September 9, 2006	San Diego, California	United States	Cox Arena
September 10, 2006	San Bernardino, California	United States	Hyundai Pavilion
September 12, 2006	Las Vegas, Nevada	United States	House of Blues
September 13, 2006	Phoenix, Arizona	United States	Dodge Theatre
September 15, 2006	West Valley City, Utah	United States	E Center
September 16, 2006	Greenwood Village, Colorado	United States	Coors Amphitheatre
September 17, 2006	Albuquerque, New Mexico	United States	Journal Pavilion
September 19, 2006	Oklahoma City, Oklahoma	United States	Zoo Amphitheatre
September 21, 2006	Milwaukee, Wisconsin	United States	Eagles Ballroom
September 22, 2006	Chicago, Illinois	United States	Congress Theater
September 23, 2006	Columbus, Ohio	United States	Nationwide Arena
September 24, 2006	Clarkston, Michigan	United States	DTE Energy Music Theatre
September 25, 2006	Toronto, Ontario	Canada	Molson Amphitheatre
September 27, 2006	Montreal, Quebec	Canada	Bell Centre
September 28, 2006	Uniondale, New York	United States	Nassau Coliseum
September 29, 2006	Boston, Massachusetts	United States	Bank of America Pavilion
September 30, 2006	Holmdel Township, New Jersey	United States	PNC Bank Arts Center
October 1, 2006	Atlantic City, New Jersey	United States	House of Blues
October 3, 2006	Portsmouth, Virginia	United States	NTelos Wireless Pavilion
October 4, 2006	Charleston, South Carolina	United States	The Plex
October 6, 2006	Tampa, Florida	United States	St. Pete Times Forum
October 7, 2006	Sunrise, Florida	United States	BankAtlantic Center
October 8, 2006	Orlando, Florida	United States	Hard Rock Live

=== Notable events ===
==== Guest singers ====
At the September 23 show in Columbus, Ohio, Angela Gossow joined Megadeth onstage during the second half of "Peace Sells". Earlier in the show, during Overkill's final song, two members of Lamb of God joined them onstage..

At the September 25 show in Toronto, Angela Gossow, Randy Blythe, and Bobby "Blitz" Ellsworth joined Megadeth on stage and sang the final part of "Peace Sells" with him.

==== Lack of a second stage on some tour stops ====
At the September 9 show in San Diego, September 13 show in Phoenix, Arizona, September 24 in Clarkston, Michigan, and September 29 show in Boston there was no second stage. The bands that performed were, in order of appearance, Overkill, Arch Enemy, Opeth, Lamb of God, and Megadeth.

==== Mike Portnoy jams with Overkill ====
===== September 30, 2006 – Holmdel =====
Mike Portnoy from Dream Theater joined Overkill on stage for their song "Elimination".

==== Molson Amphitheater ====
While playing in the September 25 show in Toronto, Canada towards the beginning of Megadeth's set, Dave Mustaine had some technical problems relating to his guitar, resulting in him throwing it across the stage and walking off. The band then finished the song without Mustaine, and then followed him offstage. After fifteen minutes of chanting from the crowd, Megadeth finally returned to the stage, and with a brief apology from Dave, continued playing through their set.

===== Salt Lake City/Ecenter =====
While Lamb of God was on stage performing, someone spilled beer all over the mixing desk, which did not interfere with the band's set. However, Megadeth received some technical problems during their second set. Dave Mustaine got angry and threatened to "beat the hell out of whoever did it" and asked the crowd to bring the culprit to him. Dave then walked off stage for roughly 20 minutes until the problem was fixed. This can be seen in the special features of the Gigantour 2 DVD.

== Gigantour 2: Australia (2006) ==
=== Line-up ===
Megadeth, Soulfly, Arch Enemy, Caliban

=== Tour dates ===
Date	City	Country	Venue
October 21, 2006	Brisbane	Australia	Riverstage
October 22, 2006	Sydney	Australia	Hordern Pavilion
October 24, 2006	Melbourne	Australia	Festival Hall

== Gigantour 3: Australia (2007) ==
=== Line-up ===
Megadeth, Static-X, Lacuna Coil, DevilDriver, Bring Me the Horizon

=== Tour dates ===
Date	City	Country	Venue
November 10, 2007	Perth	Australia	Metro City
November 12, 2007	Adelaide	Australia	Thebarton Theatre
November 13, 2007	Melbourne	Australia	Festival Hall
November 15, 2007	Sydney	Australia	Luna Park Big Top
November 16, 2007	Sydney	Australia	Luna Park Big Top
November 18, 2007	Brisbane	Australia	Riverstage

== Gigantour 3: UK (2008) ==
=== Line-up ===
Megadeth, Job for a Cowboy, Evile

=== Tour dates ===
Date	City	Country	Venue
February 17, 2008	Norwich	England	UEA
November 18, 2008	Nottingham	England	Nottingham Rock City
November 19, 2008	Glasgow	Scotland	Carling Academy Glasgow
November 20, 2008	Newcastle	England	Carling Academy Newcastle
November 22, 2008	Birmingham	England	Carling Academy Birmingham
November 23, 2008	Manchester	England	Manchester Academy
November 24, 2008	London	England	Brixton Academy

== Gigantour 3: North America (2008) ==
=== Line-up ===
Megadeth, In Flames, Children of Bodom, Job for a Cowboy, High on Fire.

Dave Mustaine wanted a shorter lineup so each band had a chance to put on a show.

=== Tour dates ===
Date	City	Country	Venue
April 12, 2008	Denver	United States	The Fillmore
April 13, 2008	Albuquerque	United States	Journal Pavilion
April 15, 2008	Grand Prairie	United States	Nokia Theatre at Grand Prairie
April 16, 2008	Corpus Christi	United States	Concrete Street Pavilion
April 17, 2008	Houston	United States	Verizon Wireless Theater
April 19, 2008	Louisville	United States	Louisville Gardens
April 20, 2008	Atlanta	United States	Masquerade Music Park
April 22, 2008	New York City	United States	Hammerstein Ballroom
April 23, 2008	New York City	United States	Hammerstein Ballroom
April 25, 2008	Worcester	United States	Worcester Palladium
April 26, 2008	Columbia	United States	Merriweather Post Pavilion
April 28, 2008	Quebec City	Canada	Pavilion De La Jeunesse
April 29, 2008	Montreal	Canada	Bell Centre
April 30, 2008	Toronto	Canada	Arrow Hall
May 1, 2008	London	Canada	John Labatt Centre
May 3, 2008	Clarkston	United States	DTE Energy Music Theatre
May 4, 2008	Cleveland	United States	Time Warner Cable Amphitheater
May 6, 2008	Chicago	United States	Aragon Ballroom
May 7, 2008	Milwaukee	United States	Eagles Ballroom
May 9, 2008	Minneapolis	United States	Myth
May 10, 2008	Winnipeg	Canada	Winnipeg Convention Centre
May 11, 2008	Saskatoon	Canada	Prairieland Exhibition Hall
May 12, 2008	Edmonton	Canada	Shaw Conference Centre
May 14, 2008	Calgary	Canada	The Corral
May 16, 2008	Vancouver	Canada	Pacific Coliseum
May 17, 2008	Salem	United States	Salem Armory
May 19, 2008	San Jose	United States	Event Center @ San Jose State
May 20, 2008	San Diego	United States	Cox Arena
May 21, 2008	Long Beach	United States	Long Beach Arena
May 22, 2008	Mesa	United States	Mesa Amphitheatre

== Gigantour 4 (2012) ==
=== Line-up ===
Megadeth confirmed, on September 27, 2011, that Motörhead, Volbeat, and Lacuna Coil would be included in the next Gigantour that was set for early 2012.

=== Tour dates ===
Megadeth announced, on November 2, 2011, Gigantour 2012 tour dates .

Date	City	Country	Venue
January 26, 2012	Camden	United States	Susquehanna Bank Center
January 27, 2012	Uncasville	United States	Mohegan Sun Arena
January 28, 2012	New York City	United States	Theater at Madison Square Garden
January 29, 2012	Lowell	United States	Tsongas Arena
February 1, 2012	Glens Falls	United States	Glens Falls Civic Center
February 2, 2012	Quebec City	Canada	Colisée Pepsi
February 3, 2012	Montreal	Canada	Bell Centre
February 5, 2012	Kingston	Canada	K-Rock Centre
February 7, 2012	Oshawa	Canada	General Motors Centre
February 8, 2012	Hamilton	Canada	Copps Coliseum
February 9, 2012	Auburn Hills	United States	The Palace of Auburn Hills
February 10, 2012	Chicago	United States	Aragon Ballroom
February 12, 2012	Milwaukee	United States	Eagles Ballroom
February 14, 2012	Saint Paul	United States	Myth
February 16, 2012	Saskatoon	Canada	Prairieland Park
February 17, 2012	Edmonton	Canada	Shaw Conference Centre
February 18, 2012	Calgary	Canada	Big 4 Building
February 20, 2012	Abbotsford	Canada	Abbotsford Entertainment & Sports Centre
February 21, 2012	Kent	United States	ShoWare Center
February 23, 2012	San Jose	United States	Event Center
February 24, 2012	Los Angeles	United States	Gibson Amphitheatre
February 25, 2012	Phoenix	United States	Comerica Theatre
February 26, 2012	Albuquerque	United States	Tingley Coliseum
February 28, 2012	Denver	United States	Fillmore Auditorium
March 1, 2012	Dallas	United States	The Palladium
March 2, 2012	Houston	United States	Verizon Wireless Theater
March 3, 2012	Austin	United States	ACL Live at The Moody Theater

== Gigantour 5 (2013) ==
=== Line-up ===
Megadeth, Black Label Society, Device, Hellyeah, Newsted, and Death Division

=== Tour dates ===
Date	City	Country	Venue
July 3, 2013	Gilford	United States	Meadowbrook U.S. Cellular Pavilion
July 5, 2013	Uncasville	United States	Mohegan Sun Arena
July 6, 2013	Canandaigua	United States	Marvin Sands PAC
July 8, 2013	Clarkston	United States	DTE Energy Music Theatre
July 9, 2013	Rosemont	United States	Allstate Arena
July 10, 2013	Youngstown	United States	Covelli Center
July 12, 2013	Dallas	United States	Gexa Energy Pavilion
July 13, 2013	Lubbock	United States	Lonestar Amphitheatre
July 14, 2013	Corpus Christi	United States	Concrete Street Amphitheatre
July 16, 2013	Oklahoma City	United States	Zoo Amphitheatre
July 18, 2013	Bloomington	United States	U.S. Cellular Coliseum
July 19, 2013	Milwaukee	United States	Eagles Ballroom
July 20, 2013	Cadott	United States	Chippewa Valley Music Festival
July 22, 2013	Winnipeg	Canada	MTS Centre
July 23, 2013	Calgary	Canada	Stampede Corral
July 26, 2013	Edmonton	Canada	Rexall Place
July 27, 2013	Dawson Creek	Canada	EnCana Events Centre
July 29, 2013	Abbotsford	Canada	Abbotsford Entertainment Center
July 30, 2013	Everett	United States	Comcast Arena
August 1, 2013	West Valley City	United States	Maverik Center
August 2, 2013	Denver	United States	1st Bank Center
August 4, 2013	Fargo	United States	Scheels Arena (canceled)
August 7, 2013	New York City	United States	Hammerstein Ballroom
August 9, 2013	Camden	United States	Susquehanna Bank Center
August 10, 2013	Montreal	Canada	Heavy MONTRÉAL
August 11, 2013	Toronto	Canada	Molson Canadian Amphitheatre

=== Notable incidents ===
Due to frontman Jason Newsted being diagnosed with walking pneumonia, Newsted dropped off the bill from July 22–29.

On the last show of the tour, Newsted joined Megadeth to sing vocals on Metallica's "Phantom Lord" (A song originally written by Mustaine).

== Gigantour history summary ==
Dates	Concerts	Region toured	Bands
July–September 2005	39	United States, Canada	Main stage: Megadeth, Dream Theater (34 dates), Anthrax (5 dates), Fear Factory, The Dillinger Escape Plan (31 dates), Nevermore Second stage: Life of Agony, Symphony X, Dry Kill Logic, Bobaflex
September–October 2006	25	United States, Canada	Main stage: Megadeth, Lamb of God, Opeth, Arch Enemy Second stage: Overkill, Into Eternity, Sanctity, The SmashUp
October 2006	3	Australia	Megadeth, Soulfly, Arch Enemy, Caliban
November 2007	6	Australia	Megadeth, Static-X, Lacuna Coil, DevilDriver, Bring Me the Horizon (3 dates)
February 2008	7	United Kingdom	Megadeth, Job for a Cowboy, Evile
April–May 2008	30	United States, Canada	Megadeth, In Flames, Children of Bodom, Job for a Cowboy, High on Fire
January–March 2012	27	United States, Canada	Megadeth, Motörhead, Volbeat, Lacuna Coil
July–August 2013	26	United States, Canada	Megadeth, Black Label Society, Hellyeah, Device, Newsted, Death Division

== Discography ==
=== CD releases ===
- Gigantour (2006)
- Gigantour, Vol. 2 (2008)

=== DVD releases ===
- Gigantour (2006)
- Gigantour 2 (2008)
