= Warcon Enterprises =

- Founded: 2004
- Founder: Bob Chiappardi; Kevin Lyman
- Defunct: 2008
- Status: Defunct
- Distributor(s): ADA (US), Fontana (CAN)
- Genre: Post-hardcore, alternative metal
- Country of origin: U.S.
- Location: New York City
- Official website: www.warconent.com

Warcon Enterprises was a New York City based independent record label focusing on mostly post-hardcore, started by Bob Chiappardi of Concrete Marketing and Kevin Lyman, the founder of Warped Tour, in 2004. Warcon was a sponsor of the Rockstar Taste of Chaos tour. Warcon was distributed through Alternative Distribution Alliance and Fontana Distribution, and operated as the distributor of UK label Demolition Records in the United States starting in August 2006. Warcon signed contracts with artists which included integration of merchandise and marketing along with distribution of albums. Among its signatories were Helmet and My American Heart. It also released the soundtrack to the film Saw III.

Warcon Enterprises closed its doors in late 2008. There were several attempts to re-finance the label which failed. Jim Chambers (GM), Stu Fine (President), Kyle Roeger (Head of new Media), and Hadley Poole (Head of PR/Video) were all that were left in the end. Each was laid off except Chambers, who remained to handle logistical problems.

== Artists ==
- Adair
- Bleed the Dream
- Dir En Grey
- Duck Duck Goose
- Guantanamo
- Helmet
- My American Heart
- Night Kills the Day
- Opiate for the Masses
- The SmashUp
- Street Drum Corps

== Compilation albums ==
- The Best of Taste of Chaos
- The Best of Taste of Chaos Two.
- Taste of Christmas
- Saw III Soundtrack
