= Todessehnsucht =

Studio album by Atrocity
- Released: September 22, 1992
- Genre: Technical death metal
- Length: 47:43
- Label: Roadrunner

Atrocity chronology
Hallucinations (1990)	Todessehnsucht (1992)	Blut (1994)

Todessehnsucht is the second studio album by the heavy metal band Atrocity. It was released in 1992. At the time the band still played death metal with a technical edge.

== History ==
The album was released in some countries with the title Longing for Death, which is a translation of the original German title. The album was released in 1992 by Roadrunner Records.

The final track on the album, "Archangel", is a cover of Death; however the lyrics are re-written as the original ones are not available.

== Track listing ==
1. "Todessehnsucht" – 3:50
2. "Godless Years" – 5:40
3. "Unspoken Names" – 5:27
4. "Defiance" – 4:58
5. "Triumph at Dawn" – 4:01
6. "Introduction" – 1:35
7. "Sky Turned Red" – 6:24
8. "Necropolis" – 4:11
9. "A Prison Called Earth" – 6:06
10. "Todessehnsucht (Reprise)" – 2:05
11. "Archangel (Death cover) " – 3:28

== Personnel ==
- Alexander Krull - vocals
- Mathias Röderer - guitar
- Richard Scharf - guitar
- Oliver Klasen - bass
- Michael Schwarz - drums
