= Werk 80 =

Studio album by Atrocity
- Released: Summer 1997
- Recorded: Spring 1997; Danse Macabre Studio; Bayreuth, Germany
- Genre: Industrial metal, gothic metal
- Length: 46:06
- Label: Massacre
- Producer: Alexander Krull, Bruno Kramm

Atrocity chronology
| Willenskraft (1996) | Werk 80 (1997) | Non Plus Ultra: 1989-1999 (1999) |

Singles from Werk 80
- 1. "Shout" Released: 1997; 2. "Tainted Love" Released: 1997; 3. "Das Letzte Mal" Released: 1997

Werk 80 is the fifth full-length album by German industrial gothic metal band Atrocity and was released in 1997. It's the band's first full-length album with cover versions of popular 1980s songs. Atrocity released a sequel, Werk 80 II, in 2008.

== Track listing ==
=== CD ===
| No. | Title | Writer(s) | Original artist | Length |
|---|---|---|---|---|
| 1. | "Shout" | Roland Orzabal, Ian Stanley | Tears for Fears | 6:30 |
| 2. | "Rage Hard" | Brian Nash, Holly Johnson, Mark O'Toole, Peter Gill | Frankie Goes to Hollywood | 5:00 |
| 3. | "Wild Boys" | Andy Taylor, John Taylor, Nick Rhodes, Roger Taylor, Simon Le Bon | Duran Duran | 4:13 |
| 4. | "The Great Commandment" | Heiko Maile, Marcus Meyn, Oliver Kreyssig | Camouflage | 3:31 |
| 5. | "Send Me An Angel" | David Sterry, Richard Zatorski | Real Life | 3:50 |
| 6. | "Tainted Love" | Ed Cobb | Gloria Jones | 2:50 |
| 7. | "Der Mussolini" | Gabi Delgado, Robert Görl | D.A.F. | 3:50 |
| 8. | "Being Boiled" | Philip Oakey, Martyn Ware, Ian Craig Marsh | The Human League | 3:52 |
| 9. | "Don't Go" | Alison Moyet, Vince Clarke | Yazoo | 3:04 |
| 10. | "Let's Dance" | David Bowie | David Bowie | 5:14 |
| 11. | "Maid of Orleans" | Andy McCluskey | Orchestral Manoeuvres in the Dark | 4:12 |
| 12. | "Die Deutschmaschine" (bonus track on limited edition) | And One | And One | 4:28 |

=== LP ===
Disc one, side one
| No. | Title | Writer(s) | Length |
|---|---|---|---|
| 1. | "Shout" | Orzabal, Stanley | 6:30 |
| 2. | "Rage Hard" | Nash, Johnson, O'Toole, Gill | 5:00 |
| 3. | "Wild Boys" | Taylor, Taylor, Rhodes, Taylor, Le Bon | 4:13 |

Disc one, side two
| No. | Title | Writer(s) | Length |
|---|---|---|---|
| 4. | "The Great Commandment" | Maile, Meyn, Kreyssig | 3:31 |
| 5. | "Send Me An Angel" | Sterry, Zatorski | 3:50 |
| 6. | "Tainted Love" | Cobb | 2:50 |
| 7. | "Der Mussolini" | Delgado, Görl | 3:50 |

Disc two, side one
| No. | Title | Writer(s) | Length |
|---|---|---|---|
| 8. | "Being Boiled" | Oakey, Ware, Marsh | 3:52 |
| 9. | "Don't Go" | Moyet, Clarke | 3:04 |
| 10. | "Let's Dance" | Bowie | 5:14 |
| 11. | "Maid of Orleans" | McCluskey | 4:12 |

Disc two, side two
| No. | Title | Writer(s) | Original artist | Length |
|---|---|---|---|---|
| 12. | "Das Letzte Mal" (original title: "Als Wär's Das Letzte Mal") | | Deutsch-Amerikanische Freundschaft |
| 13. | "Die Deutschmaschine" | And One | And One |
| 14. | "Verschwende Deine Jugend" | | Deutsch-Amerikanische Freundschaft |

=== Werk 80 II limited edition ===
On 29 February 2008 Atrocity released the follow-up Werk 80 II. A limited two disc edition was released on the same day, with on the second disc a re-pressing of the original Werk 80 with additional bonus tracks that had been previously released as tracks on the fourth side of the LP and two extra tracks of singles released from Werk 80: "Tainted Love (Albrin-mix)" and "Shout (Edit)".:

== Credits ==
- Produced by Alexander Krull & Bruno Kramm.
- Recorded & Mixed at Dance Macabre Studio, Bayreuth.
- Engineered by Bruno Kramm, Eva Istok, Ingo Beitz.
- Mixed by Bruno Kramm and Alexander Krull.
- Mastered by Alexander Krull at Master Sound.
- Keyboards and sampling by Bruno Kramm.
- Guest vocals by Liv Kristine Espenaes.
- Classical voice by Sofia Solovej.
