= Atrocity (band) =

German metal band

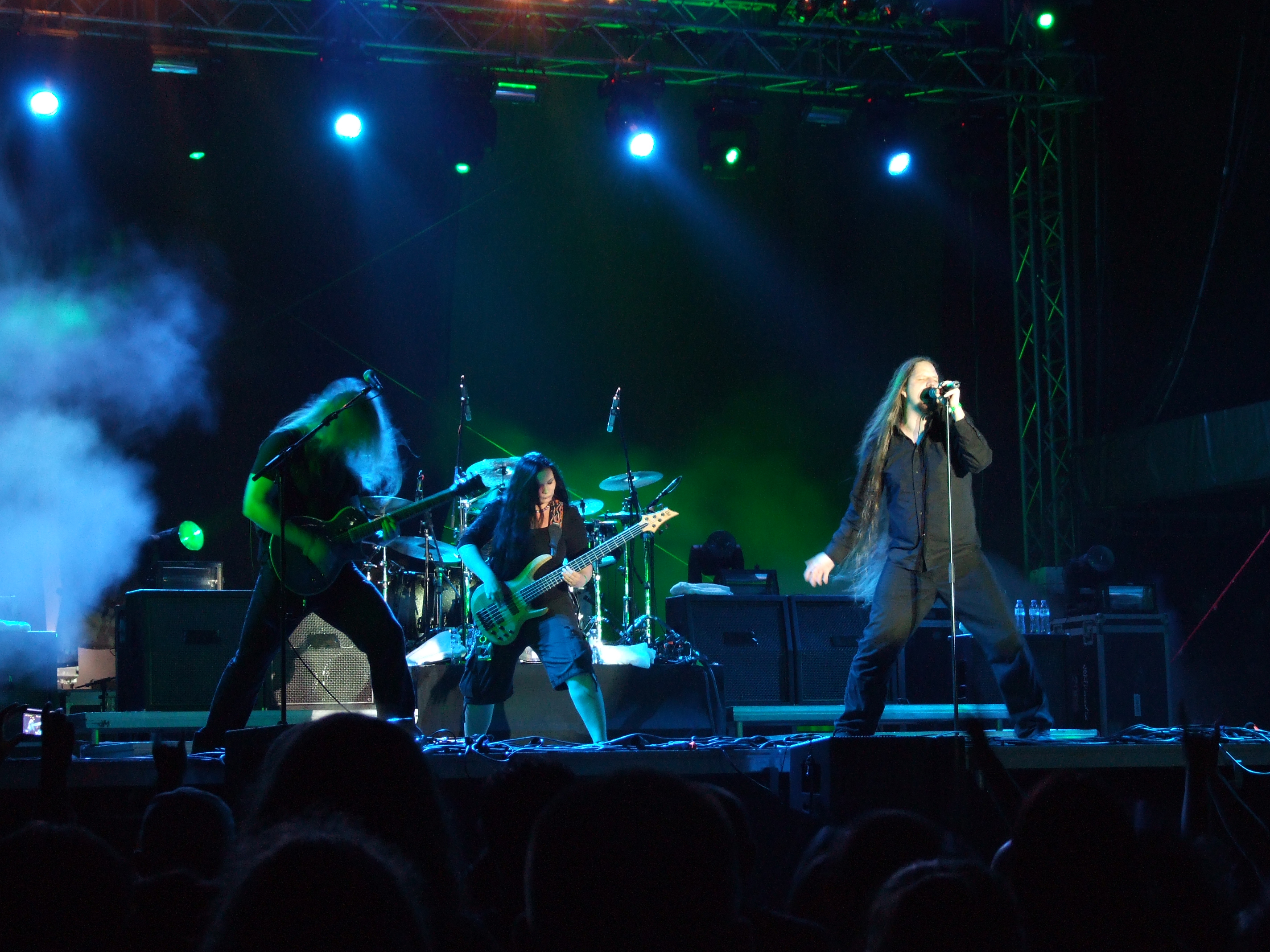
- Atrocity performs at the Kavarna Rock Fest in 2010

Background information
- Origin: Ludwigsburg, Germany
- Genres: Gothic metal; death metal; industrial metal; folk metal; symphonic metal (later); technical death metal (early)
- Years active: 1985–present
- Labels: Nuclear Blast; Roadrunner; Massacre; Motor; Napalm
- Spinoffs: Leaves' Eyes
- Members: Alexander Krull; Luc Gebhardt; Florian Ewert; Simon Skrlec
- Past members: Thorsten Bauer; Sander van der Meer; Richard Scharf; Oliver Klasen; Michael Schwarz; Markus Knapp; Martin Schmidt; Christian Lukhaup; Moritz Neuner; Nick Barker; Alla Fedynich; Mathias Röderer; Seven Antonopoulos; Roland Navratil; Pete Streit; Marc 'Micki' Richter; Joris Nijenhuis
- Website: atrocity.de

Atrocity is a German metal band from Ludwigsburg that formed in 1985.

== History ==
First started in 1985 as Instigators and playing grindcore, Atrocity became a death metal band with their debut EP, Blue Blood, in 1989, followed by Hallucinations, a concept album about drug use. Their second album, Todessehnsucht ("longing for death"), featured a cover of "Archangel" by the band Death. Their musical scope broadened over the years, incorporating medieval and horror influences on their 1994 Dracula-based concept album Atrocity's Blut, (styled after the successful film Bram Stoker's Dracula). Atrocity's Blut was followed by Calling the Rain, an MCD with female vocals by guest singer Yasmin Krull and acoustic music.

The 1996 release Willenskraft introduced industrial elements, with the special bonus CD of the album's special edition (Kraft und Wille) including electronic remixes of the songs. The later releases were less metallic. Werk 80 featured versions of 1980s disco hits and the band had no apparent direction for the following few years. Unusual MCD releases and experimental songs like "Lili Marlene" covers (featured on Gemini) alienated many fans.

The band performed at Wacken Open Air in August of 1999. After 2000, nothing was heard from Atrocity, and they seemed to have disbanded. They returned after four years with a new concept album, Atlantis, centered on the myths of the sunken continent of Atlantis. The album features the vocals of Alexander's wife, Liv-Kristine Espanaes Krull (formerly in Theatre of Tragedy). The band members formed the atmospheric metal band Leaves' Eyes, which features Liv Kristine as lead singer.

The release of the eleventh album, After the Storm, in 2010, started a new era for the band in the ethno metal genre. Yasmin Krull returned a second time as guest singer and instrumentalist for the project.

On 11 November 2007, Atrocity announced that bassist Chris Lukhaup was leaving the band for personal reasons and that drummer Moritz Neuner was taking another turn in his working career. Seven Antonopolous was named the new drummer in late October 2008.

== Members ==
Current members

- Alexander Krull – lead vocals, keyboards, samples (1985–present)
- Luc Gebhardt – guitar (2022–present)
- Florian Ewert – guitar (2024–present)
- Simon Skrlec – drums (2025–present)

== Discography ==
=== Studio albums ===
- 1990: Hallucinations
- 1992: Todessehnsucht
- 1994: Blut
- 1996: Willenskraft
- 1997: Werk 80 (cover album)
- 2000: Gemini
- 2004: Atlantis
- 2008: Werk 80 II (cover album)
- 2013: Okkult
- 2018: Okkult II
- 2023: Okkult III

=== Collaborations ===
- 1995: Calling the Rain (EP, feat. Yasmin Krull)
- 1995: Die Liebe (feat. Das Ich)
- 2010: After the Storm (feat. Yasmin Krull)

=== Compilations ===
- 1996: Kraft & Wille (video collection & The Hunt EP)
- 1999: Non Plus Ultra: 1989–1999 (best-of)

=== DVD ===
- 2012: Die Gottlosen Jahre

=== Demos ===
- 1988: Instigators
- 1993: Promo '93

=== EPs ===
- 1996: The Hunt
- 1996: The Definition of Kraft and Wille
- 2017: Masters of Darkness
- 2019: Spell of Blood

=== Music videos ===
Year	Title	Directed	Album
1994	"B.L.U.T."	—	Blut
1994	"Miss Directed"	—	Blut
1995	"Calling the Rain"	—	Calling the Rain
1995	"Die Liebe"	—	Die Liebe
1996	Love Is Dead	—	Willenskraft
1997	"Shout"	—	Werk 80
1997	"The Great Commandment"	—	Werk 80
2000	"Taste of Sin"	—	Gemini
2006	"Cold Black Days"	Thomas Manglitz	Atlantis
2008	"The Sun Always Shines on TV"	Silvan Büge	Werk 80 II
2009	"Fade to Grey"	—	Werk 80 II
2013	"Pandaemonium"	Rainer ZIPP Fränzen (Und Action!)	Okkult
2013	"Murder Blood Assassination"	—	Okkult
