= Hallucinations (Atrocity album) =

- Cover art by H. R. Giger

Studio album by Atrocity
- Released: 15 October 1990
- Recorded: Morrisound Recording, Tampa, Florida, June/July 1990
- Genre: Technical death metal
- Length: 35:54
- Label: Nuclear Blast, Roadrunner
- Producer: Markus Staiger, Scott Burns, Tom Morris, Atrocity

Atrocity chronology
Blue Blood (1989)	Hallucinations (1990)	Todessehnsucht (1992)

Professional ratings
Review scores
Source	Rating
Allmusic	4/5 stars

Hallucinations is the debut album by the German death metal band Atrocity. It was released in 1990 by Roadrunner Records and was produced by Scott Burns. It is a concept album which follows the story of a young girl who is sexually abused as a child, and her descent into drug abuse, prostitution and eventual death.

The album was reissued in 1997 with the Blue Blood EP.

== Track listing ==
No.	Title	Length
1.	"Deep in Your Subconscious"	5:26
2.	"Life Is a Long and Silent River"	3:36
3.	"Fatal Step"	2:45
4.	"Hallucinations"	4:30
5.	"Defeated Intellect"	5:25
6.	"Abyss of Addiction"	3:39
7.	"Hold Out (To the End)"	5:14
8.	"Last Temptation"	5:17
Total length:		35:54

== Personnel ==
Atrocity

- Alexander Krull - vocals
- Mathias Röderer - guitar
- Richard Scharf - guitar
- Oliver Klasen - bass
- Michael Schwarz - drums

Production

- Scott Burns and Atrocity - production
- Markus Staiger - executive production
- Scott Burns and Tom Morris - engineering
- Scott Burns and Atrocity - mixing
- H.R. Giger - cover illustration: Work Nº 93, “Hommage an S. Beckett I”
