= Jim Kaufman =

American born record producer (born 1981)

- Born: James Kaufman; June 27, 1981 (age 44); Phoenix, Arizona, United States
- Genres: Rock, country, electronic
- Occupations: Producer, multi-instrumentalist, songwriter, recording artist, mixer, film and TV composer, mastering engineer, recording studio owner
- Instruments: Piano, guitar, synthesizer, percussion
- Years active: 1994–present
- Website: jimkaufmanproductions.com

Jim Kaufman is an American born record producer who is also a multi-instrumentalist, songwriter, recording artist, mixer, film and television composer, mastering engineer and recording studio owner.

Kaufman began playing piano at the age of 5 and later studied music theory at the New School for the Arts and Academics, which was also where he started playing guitar. After a stint in a local Phoenix area band, Projex, he began his professional music career as the guitar player and founding member of the industrial alt metal indie band, Opiate for the Masses. In 2003 he took a job as engineer/studio assistant for Charlie Clouser (ex-Nine Inch Nails). With Clouser, Kaufman assisted on Helmet’s 2004 Interscope Records release Size Matters. In addition, he assisted Clouser on scoring the horror film Saw. After working with Clouser, Opiate for the Masses reconvened in Los Angeles to write and record their full-length debut for Warcon/American Voodoo entitled The Spore, which also marked the beginning of Kaufman’s career as a producer.

In early 2007, Kaufman composed the score for Josh Eisenstadt’s full length horror film Dark Reel, starring Edward Furlong. While scoring Dark Reel, Kaufman simultaneously produced the first CD of the singer/songwriter Samuel Markus and The Only Ones.

In 2005, Kaufman created American Voodoo Records, which was distributed by EMI. In 2006, he became co-owner of the Nashville-based publishing company, The Song Factory, along with his father, Jim Kaufman, Sr. and Jennifer Johnson.

Jim Kaufman presently owns and operates recording studios in both Los Angeles, California, and Sedona, Arizona.

== Discography/filmography ==
Producer

- The Black Moods – Laurel Canyon (American Voodoo 2004) – Producer/Engineer/Mixer
- Helmet – Size Matters – Interscope Records 2004) – Engineer
- Opiate For The Masses – The Spore (WARCON Universal 2005) – Producer /Engineer/Writer/Mixer
- Funeral For A Friend – Taste Of Christmas – This Christmas Eve (Atlantic Warcon Universal 2005) – Producer /Eng.
- Emery – Taste Of Christmas- The Last Christmas (Tooth and Nail Warcon Universal 2005) – Producer /Engineer
- Skindred – Taste of Christmas Jungle Bells (Lava Warcon Universal 2005) – Producer /Engineer
- Samuel Markus – The Only Ones (2008) – Producer /Engineer
- E.G. Daily The New Collection (2009) – Producer /Engineer/Writer
- The Hypo Twins – It’s Showtime (American Voodoo EMI 2010) – Producer /Engineer
- Phantom Communiqué – The Wolf And the Sheep (American Voodoo EMI 2010) – Producer /Engineer
- The New Affect – Electro Soul (American Voodoo EMI 2011) – Producer /Engineer
- The Black Moods – This is Lights Not Sound (2011) – Producer /Engineer
- Ryan Sims – (2011) – Producer /Engineer
- The Black Moods – The Black Moods (2012) – Producer /Engineer
- Dead Money Massive (2013) – Producer /Engineer/Writer
- Telegraph – Telegraph (2013) – Producer /Engineer
- Govindas and Radha- Live at Bhakti Yoga Shala (2013) – Producer /Engineer
- Jim Kaufman – A Party of One (2013) – Producer /Engineer/Writer
- Lansdowne (2014) – Producer /Engineer/Writer
- Clark Graham (2014) – Producer /Engineer
- The Black Moods "Killers in the Night EP" (2014) – Producer /Engineer
- Zeale (2014) – Producer /Engineer/Writer
- Hyro Da Hero (2014) – Producer /Engineer/Writer
- Saturn City (2014) – Producer /Engineer/Writer
- Art of Shock (2015) – Producer /Engineer
- Spiritual Rez (2015 – Upcoming Release) – Producer /Engineer
- Dillon Campbell (2015 – Upcoming Release) – Producer /Engineer
- Carolina (2015 – Upcoming Release) – Producer /Engineer
- Anti-Flag – American Spring (Spinefarm 2015) – Producer /Engineer
- Beware of Darkness – Are You Real? (Bright Antenna Records 2016 – Upcoming Release) – Producer /Engineer
- Danny Worsnop – The Prozac Sessions (2017) – Producer /Engineer/Writer
- BFI (2016 – Upcoming Release) – Producer /Engineer
- The Donner Party (2016) – Producer /Engineer
- Varsity Week (Century Media 2016) – Producer /Engineer
- Night Riots (2016 – Sumerian Records 2016) – Producer/Engineer/Writer

Engineer technical mixing re-mixing

- Awolnation – "Sail" re-mix (Red Bull Records 2011)
- The Morning Birds – "OH YEAH" (mixing) (2011)
- Funeral For a Friend – "Monsters" (re-mix)
- Helmet – Size Matters (engineering editing) (Interscope Records 2004)

Mastering

- Timefield Remnants (2015)
- Jake Dean Band – "A Hand For Those" 2011

Composer

- Night Riots (2016 – Sumerian Records 2016)
- Danny Worsnop – The Prozac Sessions (2016)
- Saturn City (2014)
- Hyro Da Hero (2014)
- Zeale (2014)
- Lansdowne (2014)
- Jim Kaufman – A Party of One (2013)
- Model Turned Superstar (2013)
- Dead Money Massive (2013)
- SNAFU (upcoming 2011) Shoreline Films
- Wong Side of Town (Lionsgate 2010)
- E.G. Daily The New Collection (2009)
- Dark Reel (LIONSGATE 2008)
- Commit to the Line (documentary 2008)
- Hot Wheels AcceleRacers (Mattel Toy company 2005)
- Opiate For The Masses – The Spore (WARCON Universal 2005)

Assistant to composer

- Saw (Lionsgate 2004)
