= Channel Zero (band) =

Belgian thrash metal band

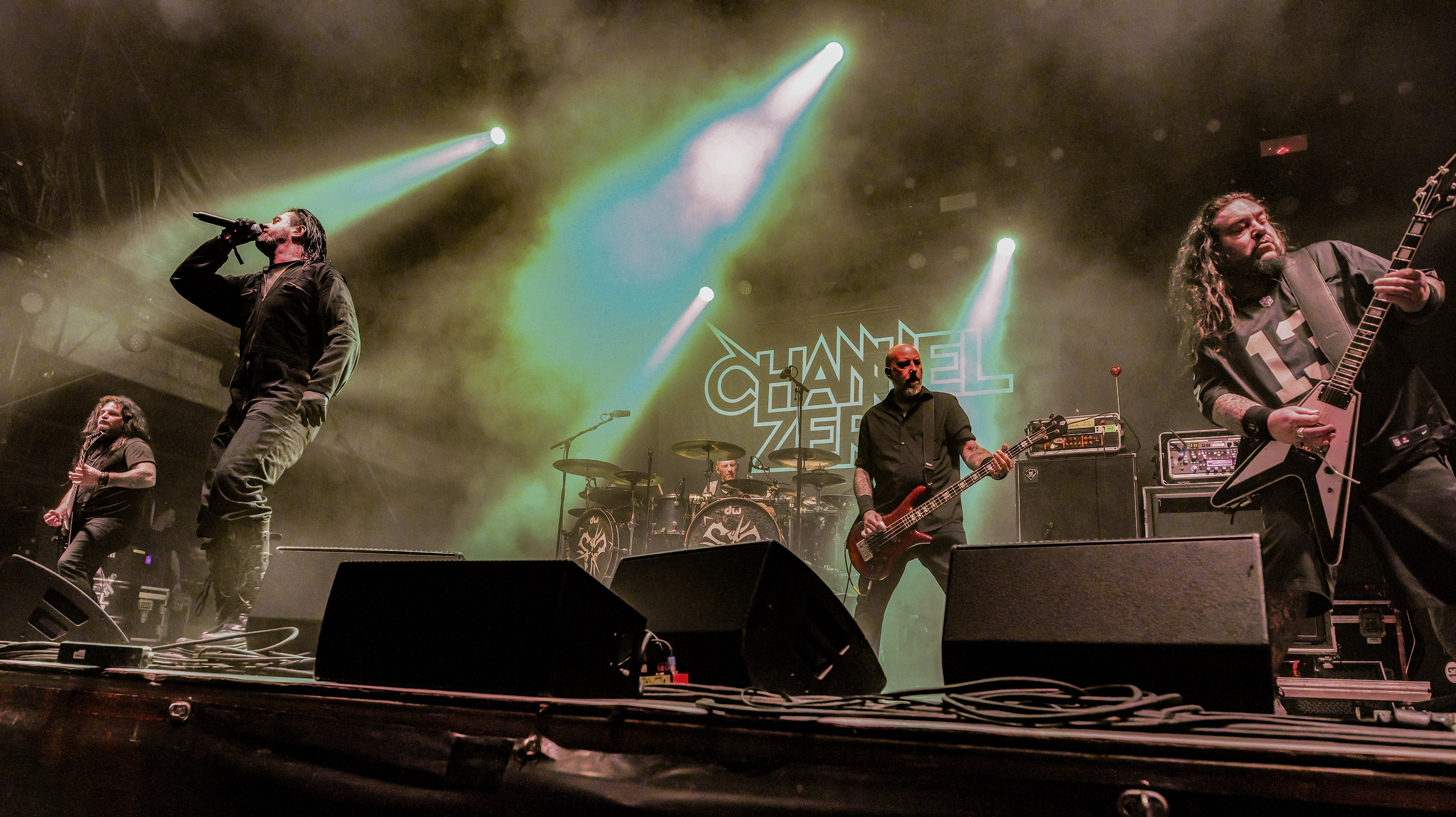
- Channel Zero performing in 2023

Background information
- Origin: Brussels, Belgium
- Genres: Thrash metal, groove metal
- Years active: 1990–1997, 2009–present
- Labels: Shark, Play It Again Sam, Roadrunner, Metal Blade
- Members: Franky De Smet-Van Damme; Tino DeMartino; Mikey Doling; Seven Antonopoulos; Christophe Depree
- Past members: Phil Baheux; Xavier Carion; Roy Mayorga; Peter Iterbeke; Patrice Hubloux
- Website: channel-zero.be
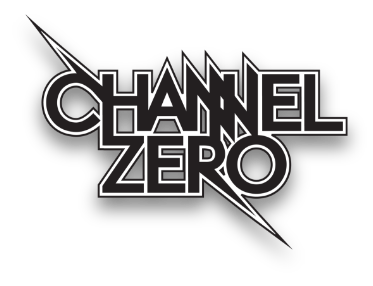

Channel Zero is a Belgian groove/thrash metal band formed in Brussels in 1990. They are one of the best known heavy metal bands from Belgium. They disbanded at the height of their career in 1997, however in 2009, the band announced a series of reunion gigs starting in January 2010.

== History ==
Channel Zero was formed in Brussels in 1990. They released their first album Channel Zero in 1992. Their second album Stigmatized for Life (mixed by Vinnie Paul of Pantera) followed in 1993.

They achieved their breakthrough with the album Unsafe in 1994. The album featured guest vocals of Billy Milano of S.O.D. and Richard 23 of Front 242. Their last studio album Black Fuel was released in 1996.

In 1997, the band announced their break-up. They released one last live album of their performance at Marktrock, Leuven in 1997, simply titled Live. Franky De Smet Van Damme went on to form his own band Skitsoy, while Xavier Carion later formed Sons of Jonathas.

In 2010, the band played six reunion shows in the AB concert hall in Brussels. The first three sold out within 49 minutes, and the next two announced one week later, again sold out.

A single, "Black Flowers", was released in January 2010. On 5 April 2010, de Smet revealed that they are working on a new album, during an interview he gave during 'De zwaarste lijst', a radio show on the Belgian radio station Studio Brussel.

The band played concerts at the Graspop Metal Meeting in 2010 and 2011 in Dessel. They also played at Rock Werchter in 1995, back when the festival was still known as Torhout-Werchter, and in 2010.

The band's former drummer, Phil Baheux, died on 10 August 2013 at the age of 45.

In October 2013, the band announced that they would continue the work made on the new album, with Roy Mayorga playing the drums as a session drummer. Chris "Seven" Antonopoulos became the permanent drummer after the album's release. Their sixth studio album, Kill All Kings, was released on 24 June through Metal Blade Records. Christophe Depree, from fellow Belgian metal band After All, joined the band as a second guitarist in late 2017.

On 23 October 2024, the band announced on their social media that they will disband after one last concert on 12 December 2026.

== Members ==
Current members

- Franky De Smet-Van Damme – vocals (1990–1997, 2009–present)
- Tino De Martino – bass (1990–1997, 2009–present)
- Mikey Doling – lead guitar (2009–present)
- Seven Antonopoulos – drums (2014–present)
- Christophe Depree – rhythm guitar (2017–present)

Former members

- Phil Baheux – drums (1990–1997, 2009–2013; died 2013)
- Xavier Carion – lead guitar (1990–1997)
- Patrice Hubloux – rhythm guitar (1990–1992; died 1995)
- Peter Iterbeke – rhythm guitar (1992–1993)

Session members

- Roy Mayorga – drums (2013–2014)

Timeline

== Discography ==
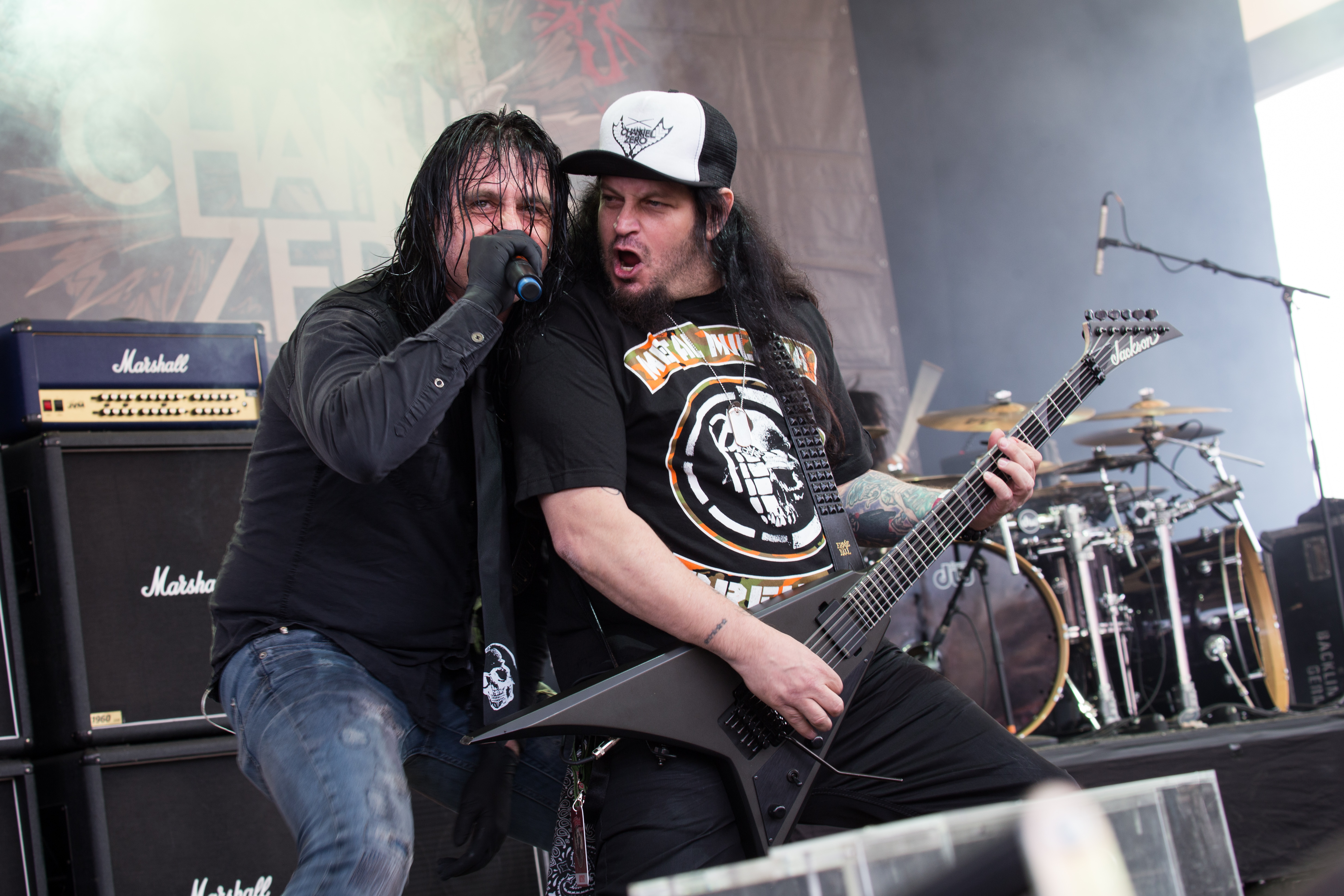
Channel Zero live at Rock Hard Festival 2015

Albums:

- Channel Zero (Shark Records – 1992)
- Stigmatized for Life (Shark Records – 1993)
- Unsafe (Play It Again Sam – 1994)
- Black Fuel (Play It Again Sam – 1997)
- Feed 'Em with a Brick (Roadrunner Records – 2011)
- Kill All Kings (Metal Blade Records – 2014)
- Exit Humanity (Joint Venture Channel Zero – 2017)

Live albums:

- Live (Play It Again Sam – 1997)
- Live at the Ancienne Belgique – CD + DVD (CNR Records / Roadrunner Records – 2010)
- Unplugged (2015)

EPs:

- Suck My Energy (Play It Again Sam – 1995)
- Help (Play It Again Sam – 1995)
- Heroin (Play It Again Sam – 1995)
- Fool's Parade (Play It Again Sam – 1996)

Singles:

- "Run W.T.T." (Play It Again Sam – 1995)
- "Call On Me" (Play It Again Sam – 1997)
- "Black Flowers" (Roadrunner Records – 2010)
- "Hot Summer" (Roadrunner Records – 2011)
- "Electronic Cocaine" (Metal Blade Records – 2014)
