= Okkult =

Studio album by Atrocity
- Released: April 22, 2013
- Genre: Death metal, symphonic death metal, gothic metal
- Length: 56:01
- Label: Napalm Records
- Producer: Alexander Krull

Atrocity chronology
After the Storm (2010)	Okkult (2013)	Masters of Darkness (2017)

Professional ratings
Review scores
Source	Rating
Metal Blast	4/5 stars
Time For Metal – Magazin	9.5/10 stars

Okkult is the ninth studio album by the gothic metal band Atrocity. It was released in 2013 on Napalm Records. With this album, the band returned to a death-metal sound, but also incorporated a symphonic metal edge.

== Track listing ==
1. "Pandaemonium"
2. "Death by Metal"
3. "March of the Undying"
4. "Haunted by Demons"
5. "Murder Blood Assassination"
6. "Necromancy Divine"
7. "Satans Braut"
8. "Todesstimmen"
9. "Masaya (Boca del Infierno)"
10. "When Empires Fall to Dust"
11. "Beyond Perpetual Ice"
12. "La Voisine"

== Personnel ==
Atrocity

- Alexander Krull – vocals, programming, samples
- Joris Nijenhuis – drums
- Sander van der Meer – guitars, backing vocals
- Thorsten Bauer – guitars, bass guitar, backing vocals

Additional musicians

- Katie Halliday – effects
- Uwe Fichtner – backing vocals
- Fullmoon Choir – backing vocals
- Annette Nußbaum – violin
- Christel Fichtner – narration, backing vocals
- Lingua Mortis Orchestra
- Liv Kristine – backing vocals

Production

- Joris Nijenhuis – engineering (assistant)
- Sander van der Meer – engineering (assistant)
- Thorsten Bauer – engineering (assistant)
- Alexander Krull – producer, recording, engineering, mixing, mastering, cover concept
- Stefan Heilemann – artwork, photography, cover concept
