= Werk 80 II =

Studio album by Atrocity
- Released: February 29, 2008
- Recorded: 2007–2008, Mastersound Studios, Stuttgart/Fellbach, Germany
- Genre: Industrial, gothic metal, gothic rock
- Length: 50:23
- Label: Napalm
- Producer: Alexander Krull

Atrocity chronology
Atlantis (2004)	Werk 80 II (2008)	After the Storm (2010)

Werk 80 II is the eighth full-length album by German industrial gothic metal band Atrocity, released on February 29, 2008 and their 2nd full-length cover album after the original Werk 80 album released in 1997. Burlesque artist Dita Von Teese is the cover model.

== History ==
Released on the same day, there was a limited edition with one bonus track, and a two-disc version which collected both Werk 80 albums, including bonus tracks for the original album which had been released as B-sides or bonus tracks on singles.

== Track listing ==
=== Standard release ===
1. "People Are People" (Martin Gore) – 3:43 (Depeche Mode cover)
2. "Smalltown Boy" (Bronski Beat) – 5:10 (Bronski Beat cover)
3. "Relax" (Peter Gill, Holly Johnson, Brian Nash, Mark O'Toole) – 3:47 (Frankie Goes to Hollywood cover)
4. "Don't You Forget about Me" (Keith Forsey, Steve Schiff) – 4:27 (Simple Minds cover)
5. "The Sun Always Shines on T.V." (Pal Waaktaar) – 4:48 (A-Ha cover)
6. "Hey Little Girl" (Iva Davies) – 4:27 (Icehouse cover)
7. "Fade to Grey" (Billy Currie, Christopher Payne, Midge Ure) – 3:26 (Visage cover)
8. "Such a Shame" (Mark Hollis) – 4:11 (Talk Talk cover)
9. "Keine Heimat" (Ideal) – 3:45 (Ideal cover)
10. "Here Comes the Rain Again" (Annie Lennox, Dave Stewart) – 4:47 (Eurythmics cover)
11. "Forever Young" (Alphaville) – 3:48 (Alphaville cover)

=== Limited edition bonus track ===
12. "Feels Like Heaven" (Eddie Jordan, Kevin Patterson) – 4:04 (Fiction Factory cover)

=== Werk 80 II limited deluxe edition ===
The limited two disc edition was released with on the second disc a re-pressing of the original Werk 80 with additional bonus tracks that had been previously released as tracks on the fourth side of the LP and two extra tracks of singles released from Werk 80: "Tainted Love (Albrin-mix)" and "Shout (Edit)".

== Personnel ==
=== Atrocity ===
- Alexander Krull: vocals, keyboards, programming, sampling
- Mathias Roderer: guitars
- Thorsten Bauer: guitars
- Christopher Lukhaup: bass
- Moritz Neuner: drums, percussion

=== Additional musicians ===
- Liv Kristine: additional lead and backing vocals
- Timon Birkhofer: additional keyboards
- In Takt: Choir; conducted by Martin Dennemarck and Claudia Bittner

== Production ==
- Recorded, produced, mixed and mastered by Alexander Krull
- Engineered by Alexander Krull and Ingmar Schelzel
- Assistant engineers: Mathias Roderer, Thorsten Bauer

== Singles ==
Year	Single
2008	"Smalltown Boy"
2008	"The Sun Always Shines on TV"
