= Kevin Lyman =

American event manager

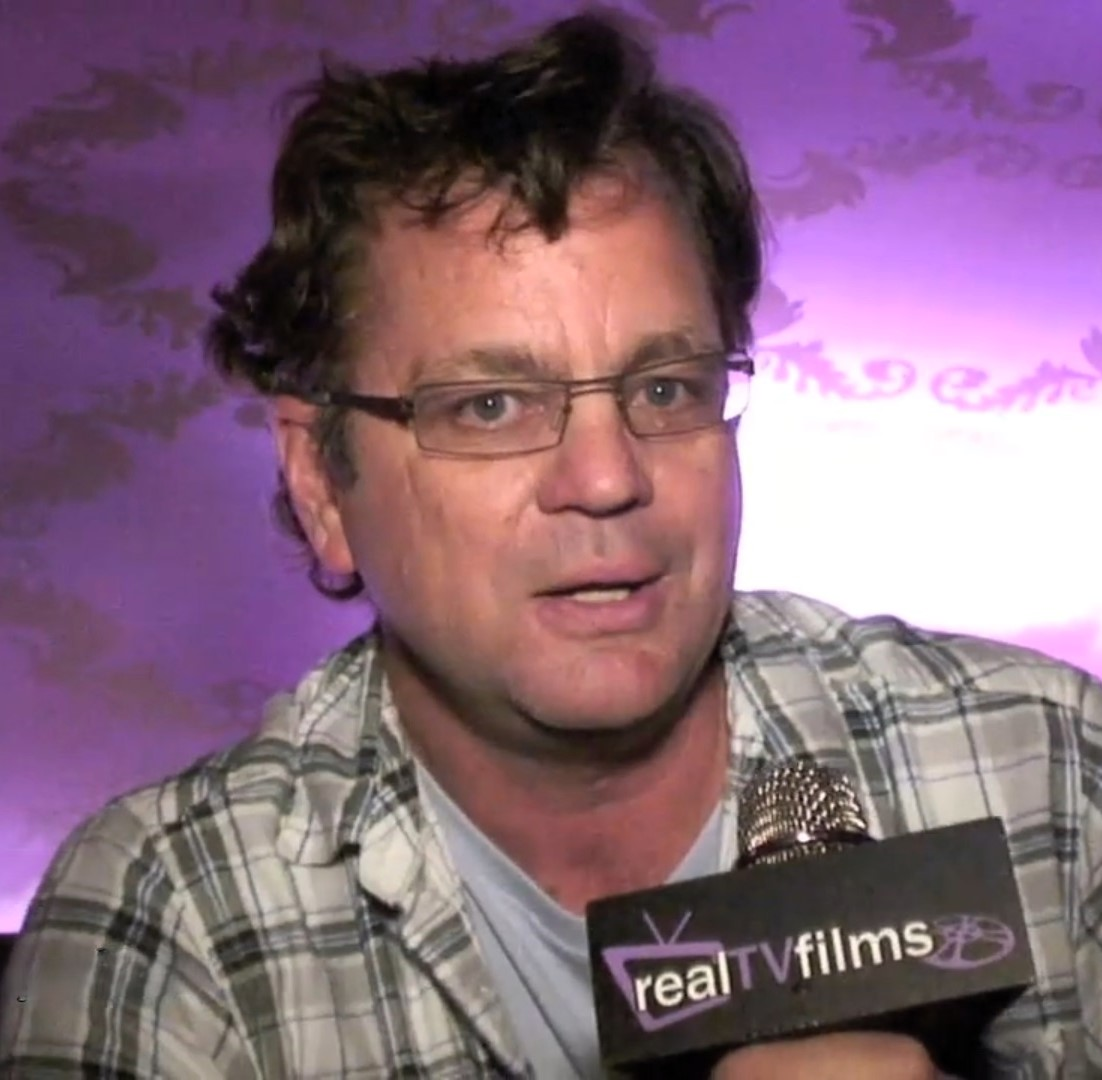
Lyman in 2012

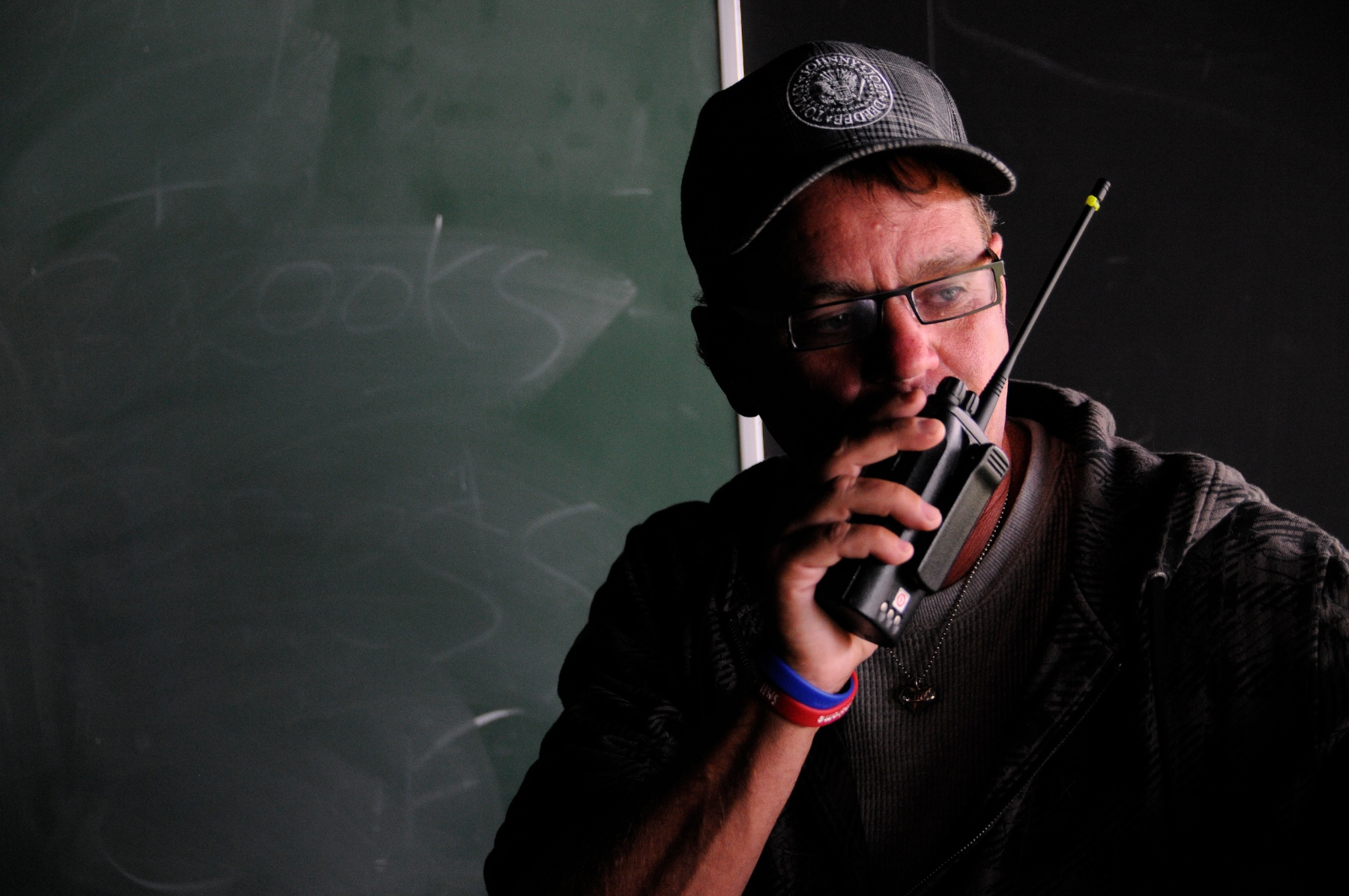
Lyman in 2009

Kevin Lyman is an American event manager who is the founder and operator of the Kevin Lyman Group, formerly known as 4Fini, Inc., a live event production company. His most notable live production is the live music festival series Vans Warped Tour, which attracted about 750,000 people annually and was the longest-running North American festival concert tour.

In the fall semester of 2018, Lyman started teaching at USC Thornton School of Music as an associate professor.

== Education ==
Kevin Lyman is a graduate of California State Polytechnic University, Pomona, with a degree in recreation administration.

== Career tours and festivals ==
=== Tours/festivals ===
- Vans Warped Tour (1995-2018, 2025-present)

=== Other productions ===
- In 2014, 4Fini produced the first Alternative Press (AP) Music Awards show.
- Revolver Golden God Awards

== Filmography ==
Lyman has appeared in and produced multiple TV series, movies, and documentaries including FUSE TV's series Warped Roadies (from 2012–2014), No Room For Rockstars (documentary), The Other F Word (documentary), and Alternative Press's annual AP Music Award Show (2014). He is also producing the animated musical comedy Under The Boardwalk, from Paramount Animation.

== 4Fini Inc. ==
Founded by Lyman, 4Fini is a talent and brand strategy agency (4Fini Agency) and event production company (4Fini Productions) based in South Pasadena, California.

4Fini produces events in North American and globally, and its Warped Tour has helped launch the careers of artists such as Eminem, Katy Perry, No Doubt, Echosmith, and Paramore.

=== 4Fini Agency ===
In 2014, Kevin Lyman and business partner Jerra Spence created 4Fini Agency, a full service consulting firm connecting brands with the youth market.

Over the past 20 years, 4Fini has worked with youth-targeted brands including Monster Energy, Rockstar Energy, Vans, Hurley, Volcom, and retailers like Hot Topic, Journeys, and Tilly's.

=== 4Fini Productions ===
4Fini Productions is a live production house known for producing festivals, events, award shows, and concert tours worldwide.

In 2007, Kevin Lyman's The Vans Warped Tour and its significance to the punk-rock/skate community was commemorated with a time capsule and exhibit at the Rock and Roll Hall of Fame and Museum. In 2019 the exhibit reopened which ran through March 2021.

In July 2014, 4Fini produced the annual AP Music Awards at The Rock and Roll Hall Of Fame Museum.

== Speaking engagements ==
Lyman has been a speaker at SXSW 2014, Vegas Music Summit 2014, Launch Music Conference 2014, ASCAP Expo 2014, Cutting Edge Music Business Conference, Billboard's Mobile Entertainment Live!, and Digital Media Summit.
