= The New School for the Arts and Academics =

Middle/High school in Tempe, Arizona

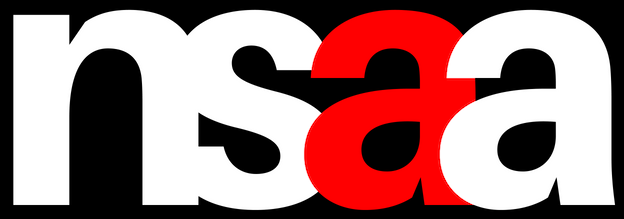
- Tempe, Maricopa County, Arizona

Information
- Other name: NSAA
- Former name: NSA
- School type: Middle/High School
- Motto: Create More.
- Founded: 1995
- Founder: Ron Caya
- Dean: Katy Ferrell-Cardenas
- Enrollment: 173 (2024-2025)
- Student to teacher ratio: 22:1

The New School for the Arts and Academics (sometimes shortened to New School for the Arts or NSAA) is a performing and visual arts charter school in Tempe, Arizona. It teaches grades 6–12. It is located on 1216 West Apache Boulevard. It offers many visual and performing arts courses, in addition to the standard requirements.

== History ==
The New School for the Arts and Academics was founded in 1995 as a high school. In 2003 the NSAA middle school was opened. In 2005 the founding director Ronald Caya retired from his position as dean. Katy Ferrell-Cárdenas, previously the principal of the middle school, took the position of dean. Maya Hoel became the middle school's principal. In the beginning of the 2007 school year, Hoel returned to being only an art teacher and is no longer the principal of the middle school. Cárdenas leads both schools.
