= Taste of Chaos =

Live music festival

- Rockstar Taste of Chaos' 2006 logo
- Genre: Post-hardcore, emo, screamo, pop punk, hardcore punk, metalcore
- Dates: February–March (US and Canada); October–December (Europe and Asia)
- Locations: United States, Canada, Europe, Asia
- Years active: 2005–2009 (US and Canada); 2005–2008 (Asia); 2005–2010 (Europe); 2015 (US); 2016 (US)
- Founders: Kevin Lyman, John Reese
- Website: tasteofchaos.com

Taste of Chaos (or "TOC") was a live music tour that was started in the winter of 2005 by Kevin Lyman, the creator of the successful Warped Tour along with his friend and business partner, John Reese. The Taste of Chaos tour catered to fans of the post-hardcore, emo, pop punk and metalcore genres, while offering the same low ticket price and festival-style format as the Warped Tour. Taste of Chaos has been called the "Winter Warped Tour" since dates ran from October (internationally) through April (in North America) of the next year. The tour was highly successful in 2005 for many of the same reasons as its summer counterpart, including cheap tickets and major bands of the genres.

== History ==
In the fall of 2005, the tour went international with The Used, Story of the Year, and Rise Against playing in Australia, Europe, and Asia. In 2007, each of the seven bands playing the entire tour was a Warped Tour veteran: five had played the 2006 Warped Tour and two (The Used and Saosin) had played TOC previously.

The 2008 lineup was the first to feature Japanese bands, them being Mucc, D'espairsRay and The Underneath.

In 2010, Taste of Chaos founder John Reese stated that although the tour was successful internationally, it had "run its course in America" and would be replaced by the Uproar Festival. Reese stated that the replacement was due to, "running out of bands that fit within the profile of what Taste of Chaos was." Uproar will feature hard rock bands and will begin shortly after the heavy metal tour Mayhem Festival in August 2010. Kevin Lyman expects the tour to continue in Europe, and is unsure if it will return to the US. For the first time since the tour began, Taste of Chaos had no dates in 2011.

On June 18, 2015, it was announced that Taste of Chaos would return with its first festival in five years. The festival took place on October 3 at the San Manuel Amphitheater in California.

It was at a Taste of Chaos show in Orlando, Florida, that Fueled By Ramen representative John Janick first saw Paramore, which led to them signing their first major recording contract.

== Ernie Ball International Battle Of The Bands ==
Ernie Ball International Battle Of The Bands started in 2006, to get popular upcoming small and unsigned bands to play the Taste of Chaos shows in their local towns across many of the tour dates. Fans determined which band is able to win by voting for all bands though the Ernie Ball International Battle Of The Bands website. The top 20 bands in each city, by way of votes were reviewed by a panel of judges who selected one band out of the top 20 to play live in their hometown on the Taste of Chaos tour.

The bands were selected based on their musicianship and live performance ability. They were judged by the founders of TOC and by a group of representatives from corporate sponsors such as Ernie Ball Inc., PureVolume, Guitar Center, and Rockstar.

== Compilations ==
As does the Warped Tour with their compilations, the Taste of Chaos tour releases compilations of the bands that are on the tour.

- Taste of Chaos (2005)
- Taste of Christmas (2005)
- The Best of Taste of Chaos (2006)
- The Best of Taste of Chaos Two. (2007)

=== Certifications ===
Region	Certification	Certified units/sales
Australia (ARIA) Australian compilation	Gold	7,500^{^}
^{^} Shipments figures based on certification alone.

== Reviews ==
- Live Review of April 2006 Calgary, AB, Canada Concert by Chris Andrade for kMNR...Music News Weekly
- Review of April 2008 Los Angeles, CA Concert by Winnie Jaing for LA.Cityzine
