= Moonbathers =

2016 studio album by Delain

Studio album by Delain
- Released: 26 August 2016
- Recorded: 2016
- Studio: Mantis Audio, Wateringen and Trypoul Studios, Neerkant, Netherlands
- Genre: Symphonic metal
- Length: 47:24
- Label: Napalm
- Producer: Martijn Westerholt

Delain studio album chronology
The Human Contradiction (2014)	Moonbathers (2016)	Apocalypse & Chill (2020)

Singles from Moonbathers
- 1. "Suckerpunch" Released: 7 February 2016; 2. "The Glory and the Scum" Released: 5 August 2016; 3. "Fire with Fire" Released: 12 August 2016

Moonbathers is the fifth studio album by the Dutch symphonic metal band Delain. It was released on 26 August 2016 worldwide.

It features one guest appearance from Alissa White-Gluz. Just like We Are the Others, this album does not feature Marko Hietala. It is the only studio album with Ruben Israel on drums and Merel Bechtold on rhythm guitar.

== Background ==
According to lead singer Charlotte Wessels, the lyrics on the album have a theme of death. This was unintentional and she only realized this after reviewing the lyrics she had written. Wessels has said that the title of the album comes from the idea that "Even in a dark place, there can also be that comfort in the dark." The songs "Danse Macabre" and "Chrysalis (The Last Breath)" were inspired by a film script, however she didn't specify which one.

- "Scandal" is a Queen cover.
- "Turn the Lights Out" was inspired by DC comic series "The Sandman" by Neil Gaiman.
- "Hands of Gold" contains fragments of "The Ballad of Reading Gaol" by Oscar Wilde.
- "Suckerpunch" and "Turn the Lights Out" were previously released on Lunar Prelude.

== Track listing ==
No.	Title	Writer(s)	Length
1.	"Hands of Gold" (featuring Alissa White-Gluz)	Charlotte Wessels, Guus Eikens, Martijn Westerholt	5:10
2.	"The Glory and the Scum"	Wessels, Eikens, Westerholt	4:04
3.	"Suckerpunch"	Wessels, Eikens, Hendrik Jan de Jong, Westerholt	4:10
4.	"The Hurricane"	Wessels, Eikens, Westerholt	3:45
5.	"Chrysalis - The Last Breath"	Wessels, Eikens, Westerholt	5:26
6.	"Fire With Fire"	Wessels, Eikens, Westerholt	4:09
7.	"Pendulum"	Wessels, Eikens, Westerholt	3:42
8.	"Danse Macabre"	Wessels, Eikens, Westerholt	5:07
9.	"Scandal" (Queen cover)	Brian May, Freddie Mercury, John Deacon, Roger Taylor	4:04
10.	"Turn the Lights Out"	Wessels, Eikens, de Jong, Westerholt, Timo Somers	4:15
11.	"The Monarch"	Wessels, Eikens, Westerholt	3:40
Total length:			47:24

Bonus CD
No.	Title	Writer(s)	Length
1.	"Suckerpunch" (Live in the Netherlands)	Wessels, Eikens, de Jong, Westerholt	4:22
2.	"Turn the Lights Out" (Live in the Netherlands)	Wessels, Eikens, de Jong, Westerholt, Somers	4:42
3.	"The Glory and the Scum" (Live in the Netherlands)	Wessels, Eikens, Westerholt	4:23
4.	"Don't Let Go" (Live in the Netherlands)	Wessels, Eikens, Westerholt	4:18
5.	"The Glory and the Scum" (Orchestra)	Wessels, Eikens, Westerholt	2:40
6.	"Hands of Gold" (Orchestra)	Wessels, Eikens, Westerholt	4:57
Total length:			25:20

== Personnel ==
Delain

- Charlotte Wessels – lead vocals
- Martijn Westerholt – keyboards, backing vocals
- Timo Somers – lead guitar, backing vocals
- Merel Bechtold – rhythm guitar
- Otto Schimmelpenninck van der Oije – bass
- Ruben Israel – drums

Additional musicians

- Alissa White-Gluz – guest vocals on "Hands of Gold"
- Guus Eikens – additional guitars
- Hendrik Jan de Jong – writing credits (3, 10)
- Oliver Philipps – additional guitars, additional keyboards
- Mikko P. Mustonen – orchestration

Production

- Martijn Westerholt – production, orchestration
- Arno Krabman – drum recording
- Bas Trumpie, Imre Beerends – mixing (10), drum recording
- Guido Aalbers, Oliver Philipps – vocal engineers
- Fredrik Nordström, Henrik Udd – mixing (1 to 9, 11)
- Ted Jensen – mastering at Sterling Sound, New York
- Glenn Arthur – cover artwork, additional paintings
- Wendy van den Bogert-Elberse – design
- Sandra Ludewig – photography

== Charts ==
Chart (2016)	Peak position
Austrian Albums (Ö3 Austria)	53
Belgian Albums (Ultratop Flanders)	23
Belgian Albums (Ultratop Wallonia)	37
Dutch Albums (Album Top 100)	15
Finnish Albums (Suomen virallinen lista)	31
French Albums (SNEP)	93
German Albums (Offizielle Top 100)	17
Japanese Albums (Oricon)	128
Scottish Albums (OCC)	34
Swiss Albums (Schweizer Hitparade)	18
UK Albums (OCC)	50
UK Album Downloads (OCC)	56
UK Independent Albums (OCC)	10
UK Rock & Metal Albums (OCC)	3
US Heatseekers Albums (Billboard)	5
