= Interlude (Delain album) =

2013 compilation album by Delain

Compilation album by Delain
- Released: 1 May 2013
- Recorded: 2011–2012
- Studio: TriPod Studios and Atlantis Studios, Stockholm, Sweden
- Genre: Symphonic metal
- Length: 53:58 (CD)
- Label: Napalm

Singles from Interlude
- 1. "Are You Done with Me" Released: 2013

Interlude is a compilation album by the Dutch symphonic metal band Delain.

The album is described in a press release as "a fantastic blend of brand-new songs, special versions and mixes of popular Delain tracks, covers, and the single 'Are You Done With Me'." Interlude also includes a special DVD featuring exclusive live footage and clips from the band's career.

== Track listing ==
=== CD ===
1. "Breathe on Me" – 3:30
2. "Collars and Suits" – 4:41
3. "Are You Done with Me" (New Single Mix) – 3:08
4. "Such a Shame" (Talk Talk cover) – 3:39
5. "Cordell" (The Cranberries cover) – 3:50
6. "Smalltown Boy" (Bronski Beat cover) – 3:09
7. "We Are the Others" (New Ballad Version) – 3:42
8. "Mother Machine" (Live) – 5:47
9. "Get the Devil Out of Me" (Live) – 3:44
10. "Milk and Honey" (Live) – 4:37
11. "Invidia" (Live) – 4:04
12. "Electricity" (Live) – 5:06
13. "Not Enough" (Live) – 5:01

=== DVD ===
1. "Invidia" (Video Live @ Metal Female Voices Fest)
2. "Electricity" (Video Live @ Metal Female Voices Fest)
3. "We Are the Others" (Video Live @ Metal Female Voices Fest)
4. "Milk and Honey" (Video Live @ Metal Female Voices Fest)
5. "Not Enough" (Video Live @ Metal Female Voices Fest)
6. Backstage Footage
7. "Get the Devil Out of Me" (Video)
8. "We Are the Others" (Video)
9. "April Rain" (Video)
10. "Frozen" (Video)

== Personnel ==
=== Delain ===
- Charlotte Wessels – vocals
- Guus Eikens – rhythm guitars
- Otto Schimmelpenninck van der Oije – bass
- Martijn Westerholt – keyboards
- Sander Zoer – drums

== Charts ==
Chart (2013)	Peak position
Belgian Ultratop (Flanders)	141
Belgian Ultratop (Wallonia)	124
Dutch Albums Chart	37
German Albums Chart	91
UK Rock Chart	15

== Release history ==
Region	Date
Norway, Spain, Sweden	1 May 2013
Austria, Finland, Germany, EU	3 May 2013
Rest of Europe	6 May 2013
Worldwide	7 May 2013
