= Hunter's Moon (Delain EP) =

2019 EP by Delain

EP by Delain
- Released: 22 February 2019
- Recorded: 2017–2018
- Genre: Symphonic metal
- Length: 64:50
- Label: Napalm

Delain EP chronology
Lunar Prelude (2016)	Hunter's Moon (2019)	Dance with the Devil (2024)

Singles from Hunter's Moon
- 1. "Masters of Destiny" Released: 11 January 2019

Hunter's Moon is the second EP by the Dutch symphonic metal band Delain. It was released on 22 February 2019. It is the first release to feature Joey de Boer on drums and the last release to feature guitarist Merel Bechtold.

== Track listing ==
No.	Title	Lyrics	Music	Length
1.	"Masters of Destiny"	Charlotte Wessels	Charlotte Wessels, Martijn Westerholt, Guus Eikens	4:54
2.	"Hunter's Moon"	Wessels	Wessels, Westerholt, Eikens	4:30
3.	"This Silence Is Mine"	Wessels	Wessels, Timo Somers	2:37
4.	"Art Kills"	Wessels	Wessels, Merel Bechtold	4:00
5.	"Hands of Gold" (live)	Wessels	Wessels, Westerholt, Eikens	5:24
6.	"Danse Macabre" (live)	Wessels	Wessels, Westerholt, Eikens	5:28
7.	"Scarlet" (live)	Wessels	Wessels, Westerholt, Eikens	4:45
8.	"Your Body Is a Battleground" (live)	Wessels	Wessels, Westerholt, Eikens	4:11
9.	"Nothing Left" (live)	Wessels	Wessels, Westerholt	5:01
10.	"Control the Storm" (live)	Wessels	Wessels, Eikens	4:24
11.	"Sing to Me" (live)	Wessels	Wessels, Westerholt, Eikens	5:14
12.	"Not Enough" (live)	Wessels	Wessels, Westerholt, Eikens	5:35
13.	"Scandal" (live)	Brian May, John Deacon, Freddie Mercury, Roger Taylor	May, Deacon, Mercury, Taylor	4:10
14.	"The Gathering" (live)	Guus Eikens	Eikens	4:37
Total length:				64:50

=== Blu-ray ===
Danse Macabre – Live at Tivoli Vredenburg
No.	Title	Lyrics	Music	Length
1.	"Hands of Gold" (featuring George Oosthoek)	Wessels	Wessels, Westerholt, Eikens	5:24
2.	"Danse Macabre"	Wessels	Wessels, Westerholt, Eikens	5:28
3.	"Scarlet"	Wessels	Wessels, Westerholt, Eikens	4:45
4.	"Your Body Is a Battleground" (featuring Marko Hietala)	Wessels	Wessels, Westerholt, Eikens	4:11
5.	"Nothing Left" (featuring Marko Hietala)	Wessels	Wessels, Westerholt	5:01
6.	"Control the Storm" (featuring Marko Hietala)	Wessels	Wessels, Eikens	4:24
7.	"Sing to Me" (featuring Marko Hietala)	Wessels	Wessels, Westerholt, Eikens	5:14
8.	"Not Enough"	Wessels	Wessels, Westerholt, Eikens	5:35
9.	"Scandal" (featuring Marko Hietala)	May, Deacon, Mercury, Taylor	May, Deacon, Mercury, Taylor	4:10
10.	"The Gathering" (featuring Marko Hietala)	Guus Eikens	Eikens	4:37
Total length:				48:49

== Personnel ==
Delain

- Charlotte Wessels – lead vocals
- Timo Somers – lead guitar, backing vocals, screams
- Merel Bechtold – rhythm guitar
- Otto Schimmelpenninck van der Oije – bass
- Martijn Westerholt – keyboards
- Joey de Boer – drums on tracks 1–4
- Ruben Israel – drums on tracks 5–14

Guests

- Twan Driessen – guest vocals on track 4
- George Oosthoek – live guest vocals on track 5
- Marko Hietala – live guest vocals on tracks 8, 9, 10, 11, 13 and 14
- Elianne Anemaat – live cello on track 7

Production

- Martijn Westerholt – production on tracks 1–2 and 5–14
- Timo Somers – production on track 3
- Merel Bechtold – production on track 4
- Jacob Hansen – mixing on tracks 1 and 2
- Bas Trumpie – mixing on tracks 3–14
- Imre Beerends – mixing on tracks 3–14
- Mika Jussila – mastering on tracks 3–14
- Mikko Mustonen – orchestrals
- Cam Rackam – cover art
- Marnix de Klerk – graphic design
- Sandra Ludewig – photos
- Charlotte Wessels – art direction

== Charts ==
Chart (2019)	Peak position
Belgian Albums (Ultratop Flanders)	109
Belgian Albums (Ultratop Wallonia)	102
Dutch Albums (Album Top 100)	54
German Albums (Offizielle Top 100)	24
Scottish Albums (OCC)	79
Swiss Albums (Schweizer Hitparade)	24
