= A Decade of Delain: Live at Paradiso =

2017 live video by Delain

Live album by Delain
- Released: 27 October 2017
- Recorded: 10 December 2016
- Genre: Symphonic metal
- Length: 110:53
- Label: Napalm

A Decade of Delain: Live at Paradiso is a live album by the Dutch symphonic metal band Delain. It was recorded at the Paradiso in Amsterdam on 10 December 2016 for the band's 10th anniversary. The live album was released on 27 October 2017.

== Track listing ==
No.	Title	Length
1.	"Intro (The Monarch)"	1:53
2.	"Hands of Gold"	5:14
3.	"Suckerpunch"	4:57
4.	"The Glory and the Scum"	4:22
5.	"Get the Devil Out of Me"	3:48
6.	"Army of Dolls"	5:21
7.	"The Hurricane"	4:02
8.	"April Rain"	5:39
9.	"Where Is the Blood"	3:41
10.	"Here Come the Vultures"	7:28
11.	"Fire With Fire"	4:27
12.	"The Tragedy of the Commons"	4:19
13.	"Danse Macabre"	4:28
14.	"Sleepwalkers Dream"	5:33
15.	"Your Body Is a Battleground"	4:11
16.	"Stay Forever"	4:39
17.	"See Me in Shadow"	5:13
18.	"The Gathering"	4:21
19.	"Pristine"	5:25
20.	"Mother Machine"	4:49
21.	"Sing to Me"	4:54
22.	"Don't Let Go"	4:53
23.	"We Are the Others"	7:16
Total length:		110:53

== Personnel ==
Delain

- Charlotte Wessels – lead vocals
- Timo Somers – lead guitar, backing vocals
- Merel Bechtold – rhythm guitar
- Otto Schimmelpenninck van der Oije – bass, backing and harsh vocals
- Martijn Westerholt – keyboards
- Ruben Israel – drums

Guest musicians

- Alissa White-Gluz – vocals on "Hands of Gold" and "The Tragedy of the Commons"
- Burton C. Bell – vocals on "Where Is the Blood"
- Rob van der Loo – bass on "Sleepwalkers Dream"
- Marko Hietala – vocals on "Your Body Is a Battleground" and "Sing to Me"
- Guus Eikens – guitars on "Sleepwalkers Dream"
- George Oosthoek – vocals on "Pristine"
- Elianne Anemaat – cello on "See Me in Shadow"
- Liv Kristine – vocals on "See Me in Shadow"
- Sander Zoer – drums on "Sleepwalkers Dream"
