= April Rain =

2009 studio album by Delain

Studio album by Delain
- Released: 20 March 2009
- Recorded: September – November 2008
- Studio: Jacob Hansen Studios, Ribe, Denmark, SpaceLab Studios, Grefrath, Germany, Excess Studios, Rotterdam, Netherlands
- Genre: Symphonic metal
- Length: 45:30
- Label: Roadrunner
- Producer: Martijn Westerholt, Oliver Philipps

Delain studio album chronology
Lucidity (2006)	April Rain (2009)	We Are the Others (2012)

Singles from April Rain
- 1. "April Rain" Released: February 2009; 2. "Stay Forever" Released: 16 October 2009; 3. "Nothing Left" Released: 2010

Professional ratings
Review scores
Source	Rating
About.com	3.5/5 stars
AllMusic	3/5 stars
Lords of Metal	(94/100)
Metal Underground	4/5 stars
Rock Sound	8/10 stars

April Rain is the second studio album by the Dutch symphonic metal band Delain. It was released in the Benelux on 20 March 2009 and was released internationally on 30 March 2009 by Roadrunner Records. It was released in Australia on 10 April 2009.

== History ==
Martijn Westerholt, founder of Delain, originally did not intend Delain to be a live band. But after the success of debut album Lucidity a live band was created which recorded the album April Rain. While Delain's previous album Lucidity featured many guest appearances, this album has only two: Maria Ahn, cellist from the Ahn Trio and Finnish singer Marko Hietala, who was featured on multiple tracks of Lucidity as well. "Virtue and Vice" is the only song on April Rain containing death growls performed by guitarist Ronald Landa, who also contributes clean vocals on "Invidia".

Demo versions of "Stay Forever" and "Start Swimming" were already played live by Delain in 2007 and 2008. In November 2008, a version of the song "I'll Reach You" with alternate lyrics was performed live on a Dutch TV show to get attention for UNICEF & BT's "Inspiring Young Minds" charity.

The original release date for the album was 9 February 2009, but in January it was announced that the release was postponed to coincide with foreign release dates.

In February 2009, "April Rain" was revealed to be the first single from this album when it became available for purchase online.

On 13 March 2009, the Dutch website of Roadrunner Records put the entire album up for streaming, only available to residents of the Netherlands.

In October 2009, "Stay Forever" was announced as the second single from the album.

== Track listing ==
No.	Title	Lyrics	Music	Length
1.	"April Rain"	C. Wessels	M. Westerholt	4:36
2.	"Stay Forever"	R. Landa, C. Wessels	M. Westerholt, R. Landa	4:26
3.	"Invidia"	C. Wessels	M. Westerholt	3:47
4.	"Control the Storm" (featuring Marko Hietala)	C. Wessels	G. Eikens	4:12
5.	"On the Other Side"	C. Wessels	G. Eikens	4:09
6.	"Virtue and Vice"	R. Landa, C. Wessels	M. Westerholt	3:55
7.	"Go Away"	G. Eikens, C. Wessels	M. Westerholt, G. Eikens	3:35
8.	"Start Swimming"	C. Wessels	R. van der Loo	5:19
9.	"Lost"	C. Wessels	M. Westerholt	3:23
10.	"I'll Reach You"	C. Wessels	M. Westerholt, G. Eikens, C. Wessels	3:29
11.	"Nothing Left" (featuring Marko Hietala)	C. Wessels	M. Westerholt	4:39

American, Digipak and Japanese editions bonus track
No.	Title	Lyrics	Music	Length
12.	"Come Closer"	C. Wessels	M. Westerholt	4:30

Japanese edition bonus track
No.	Title	Lyrics	Music	Length
13.	"No Compliance" (Charlotte only vocals)	M. Westerholt	M. Westerholt	5:09

Special MP3 Edition bonus tracks
No.	Title	Writer(s)	Length
12.	"The Gathering" (Live)	G. Eikens	11:50
13.	"Silhouette of a Dancer" (Live)	M. Westerholt, J. Yrlund, C. Wessels	5:46

== Personnel ==
Delain

- Charlotte Wessels – vocals
- Ronald Landa – guitars, vocals on track 3 and 6, backing vocals
- Martijn Westerholt – keyboards, production
- Rob van der Loo – bass guitar
- Sander Zoer – drums

Additional musicians

- Marko Hietala – vocals on tracks 4 and 11
- Maria Ahn – cello on tracks 5 and 6
- Guus Eikens – guitars on tracks 4, 5, 6 and 8
- Oliver Philipps – guitar on all tracks except 6, orchestrations, production

Production

- Jacob Hansen – engineering, mixing
- Mark Jansen – photography
- Joachim Ehrig – mastering
- Dennis van der Meule – art direction, design
- Hans de Ruiter – art direction, design

== Charts ==
Chart (2009)	Peak position
Dutch Alternative Top 30	1
Dutch Album Top 100	14
French Albums Chart	88
Swiss Albums Chart	91
German Albums Chart	96
Oricon Japanese Album Chart	127
