= Dark Waters (album) =

2023 studio album by Delain

Studio album by Delain
- Released: 10 February 2023
- Genre: Symphonic metal
- Length: 48:00
- Label: Napalm
- Producer: Martijn Westerholt

Delain studio album chronology
Apocalypse & Chill (2020)	Dark Waters (2023)

Singles from Dark Waters
- 1. "The Quest and the Curse" Released: 9 August 2022; 2. "Beneath" Released: 29 November 2022; 3. "Moth to a Flame" Released: 10 January 2023; 4. "Queen of Shadow" Released: 9 February 2023

Professional ratings
Review scores
Source	Rating
Blabbermouth	7.5/10
Louder Sound	4/5 stars
Metal Injection	7.5/10
Kerrang!	3/5 stars

Dark Waters is the seventh studio album by the Dutch symphonic metal band Delain. It was released on 10 February 2023 via Napalm Records.

It is the first studio album to feature Ludovico Cioffi on bass and the only studio album to feature lead vocalist Diana Leah. The album also marked the return of drummer Sander Zoer and original guitarist Ronald Landa.

== Background ==
On 15 February 2021, it was announced that Delain's lineup had split up, and that it would be continuing with a new lineup that Westerholt stated would continue to "keep Delain alive", which consists of new and previous members.

The band's new lineup was fully announced on the release of the first single, "The Quest and the Curse", on 9 August 2022, as well as announcing their new lead vocalist, Diana Leah. The second single, "Beneath", was released on 29 November 2022. Simultaneously on the same day of the single's release, the band announced the title of their upcoming seventh studio album, Dark Waters, with a release date of 10 February 2023. The third single, "Moth to a Flame", was released on 10 January 2023.

== Track listing ==
Dark Waters track listing
No.	Title	Length
1.	"Hideaway Paradise"	5:18
2.	"The Quest and the Curse"	4:56
3.	"Beneath"	4:59
4.	"Mirror of Night"	4:37
5.	"Tainted Hearts"	4:41
6.	"The Cold"	4:37
7.	"Moth to a Flame"	4:07
8.	"Queen of Shadow"	4:02
9.	"Invictus"	5:30
10.	"Underland"	5:13
Total length:		48:00

Bonus track
No.	Title	Length
11.	"The Quest and the Curse" (Piano version)	3:26
Total length:		51:26

=== Notes ===
- The digisleeve and limited box editions feature a second disc, containing the instrumental versions of the first disc.
- The limited box edition features a third disc, containing orchestral versions of "Tainted Hearts", "The Cold", "Invictus" and "Underland".
- A CD titled Symphonic Dark Waters was released in August 2023, containing an acoustic version of "Mirror of Night", a piano version of "Hideaway Paradise", and the orchestral versions from the limited box edition's third disc.

== Personnel ==
All information from the album booklet.

Delain

- Martijn Westerholt – keyboards, backing vocals
- Sander Zoer – drums
- Ronald Landa – guitars, backing vocals, harsh vocals
- Ludovico Cioffi – bass, backing vocals, harsh vocals
- Diana Leah – lead vocals

Additional musicians

- Rob van der Loo – bass
- Marko Hietala – guest vocals on "Invictus"
- Paolo Ribaldini – guest vocals (tracks 3, 8, 9)
- Ruud Jolie – lead guitar on "Mirror of Night"
- Mikko P. Mustonen – orchestrations

Production

- Martijn Westerholt – production, songwriting
- Jacob Hansen – mixing
- Svante Forsbäck – mastering
- Nathan Cairo – recording
- Robin la Joy – lyrics
- Guus Eikens – songwriting

== Charts ==
Chart performance for Dark Waters
Chart (2023)	Peak position
Austrian Albums (Ö3 Austria)	57
Belgian Albums (Ultratop Flanders)	57
Belgian Albums (Ultratop Wallonia)	177
Dutch Albums (Album Top 100)	35
German Albums (Offizielle Top 100)	9
Scottish Albums (Official Charts)	65
Swiss Albums (Schweizer Hitparade)	10
UK Independent Albums (Official Charts)	12
UK Rock & Metal Albums (Official Charts)	5
