= Westerholt (surname) =

Westerholt is a Dutch surname. Notable people with the surname include:

- Robert Westerholt (born 1975), Dutch guitarist, founding member of Within Temptation
- Martijn Westerholt (born 1979), Dutch musician
