= Apocalypse & Chill =

2020 studio album by Delain

Studio album by Delain
- Released: 7 February 2020
- Genre: Symphonic metal
- Length: 56:03
- Label: Napalm
- Producer: Martijn Westerholt

Delain studio album chronology
Moonbathers (2016)	Apocalypse & Chill (2020)	Dark Waters (2023)

Singles from Apocalypse & Chill
- 1. "Masters of Destiny" Released: 11 January 2019; 2. "Burning Bridges" Released: 27 September 2019; 3. "One Second" Released: 15 November 2019; 4. "Ghost House Heart" Released: 24 January 2020

Apocalypse & Chill is the sixth studio album by the Dutch symphonic metal band Delain. It was released on 7 February 2020 via Napalm Records.

It is the final studio album to feature vocalist Charlotte Wessels, guitarist Timo Somers and bassist Otto Schimmelpenninck van der Oije, as well as the only studio album to feature drummer Joey de Boer on all tracks before his departure with the other members.

== Songwriting ==
The album focuses on themes such as the climate crisis and the way people react to it, with Martijn Westerholt stating:

It's really the contrast that you see when you turn on the TV – You see Australia in flames and then you turn to Instagram and see people with awesome pictures of their garden or themselves. The perfect life. The same world but such a contrast. It's what comes across on the album in the music and in the lyrics. We are a band of contrast with the heavy guitars but with some pop and synth elements so it all comes back to that.

== Reception ==
Writing for Kerrang!, Steve Beebee stated that it was Delain's best album to date and rated it a 4/5.

Metal Injection gave the album an 8/10, stating that "symphonic metal typically sticks to familiar ground—with only marginal variation and experimentation from time to time—and Delain undoubtedly still do it better than most of their peers."

Blabbermouth also gave the album an 8/10, adding that "Delain have upped their game in every department, eschewing cynical acts of musical shark-jumping in favor of aiming for the best and most powerful manifestation of a simple idea."

== Track listing ==
Apocalypse & Chill track listing
No.	Title	Length
1.	"One Second"	3:37
2.	"We Had Everything"	4:08
3.	"Chemical Redemption"	4:39
4.	"Burning Bridges"	4:14
5.	"Vengeance"	4:52
6.	"To Live Is to Die"	3:47
7.	"Let's Dance"	4:07
8.	"Creatures"	3:39
9.	"Ghost House Heart"	2:59
10.	"Masters of Destiny"	4:53
11.	"Legions of the Lost"	5:17
12.	"The Greatest Escape"	4:26
13.	"Combustion"	5:25
Total length:		56:03

Bonus tracks
No.	Title	Length
14.	"Masters of Destiny" (Orchestral version)	3:58
15.	"Burning Bridges" (Orchestral version)	3:02
16.	"Vengeance" (Orchestral version)	4:06
Total length:		67:16

== Personnel ==
All information from the album booklet.

Delain

- Charlotte Wessels – lead vocals
- Martijn Westerholt – keyboards, backing vocals
- Timo Somers – guitars, co-lead vocals on "One Second", backing vocals
- Otto Schimmelpenninck van der Oije – bass
- Joey de Boer – drums

Guest/session musicians

- Guus Eikens – backing vocals, songwriting
- Yannis Papadopoulos – guest vocals on "Vengeance"
- Shir-Ran Yinon – violin on "Ghost House Heart" and "The Greatest Escape"
- Mikko P. Mustonen – orchestrations

Production

- Martijn Westerholt – songwriting, production, orchestrations
- Charlotte Wessels – songwriting, lyrics
- Timo Somers – songwriting, lyrics
- Jacob Hansen – mixing
- Svante Forsbäck – mastering
- Bas Trumpie – drum engineering
- Imre Beerends – drum engineering
- Tim Tronckoe – band photography
- Maxim Getman – cover art
- Marnix de Klerk – artwork
- Nina Mathijsen – artwork
- Oliver Phillips – additional arrangements on "To Live Is to Die" and "The Greatest Escape"

== Charts ==
Chart performance for Apocalypse & Chill
Chart (2020)	Peak position
Australian Digital Albums (ARIA)	49
Austrian Albums (Ö3 Austria)	43
Belgian Albums (Ultratop Flanders)	45
Belgian Albums (Ultratop Wallonia)	59
Dutch Albums (Album Top 100)	24
German Albums (Offizielle Top 100)	14
Hungarian Albums (MAHASZ)	28
Scottish Albums (OCC)	48
Swiss Albums (Schweizer Hitparade)	8
