= Dance with the Devil (EP) =

2024 EP by Delain

EP by Delain
- Released: 8 November 2024
- Genre: Symphonic metal
- Length: 63:52
- Label: Napalm
- Producer: Martijn Westerholt

Delain EP chronology
Hunter's Moon (2019)	Dance with the Devil (2024)

Singles from Dance with the Devil
- 1. "Dance with the Devil" Released: 5 September 2024; 2. "Moth to a Flame (live)" Released: 9 October 2024; 3. "The Reaping" Released: 5 November 2024

Professional ratings
Review scores
Source	Rating
Blabbermouth.net	7/10

Dance with the Devil is the third EP by the Dutch symphonic metal band Delain. It was released on 8 November 2024 via Napalm Records. It is the final release to feature lead vocalist Diana Leah.

== Track listing ==
Dance with the Devil track listing
No.	Title	Length
1.	"Dance with the Devil"	3:54
2.	"The Reaping"	3:47
3.	"Sleepwalkers Dream" (2024 version)	4:25
4.	"The Cold" (live)	3:43
5.	"Burning Bridges" (live)	4:21
6.	"The Quest and the Curse" (live)	5:08
7.	"April Rain" (live)	4:40
8.	"Invidia" (live)	3:50
9.	"Queen of Shadow" (live; featuring Paolo Ribaldini)	4:00
10.	"Your Body Is a Battleground" (live; featuring Paolo Ribaldini)	4:01
11.	"Moth to a Flame" (live)	4:44
12.	"Control the Storm" (live; featuring Paolo Ribaldini)	4:12
13.	"Dance with the Devil" (instrumental)	3:55
14.	"The Reaping" (instrumental)	3:48
15.	"Underland" (alternate version)	5:24
Total length:		63:52

Japanese bonus track
No.	Title	Length
16.	"Dance with the Devil" (acoustic version; featuring Johanna Kurkela)	3:22
Total length:		67:14

== Personnel ==
Delain

- Martijn Westerholt – keyboards
- Sander Zoer – drums
- Ronald Landa – guitars, backing vocals
- Ludovico Cioffi – bass, backing vocals
- Diana Leah – lead vocals

Additional musicians

- Paolo Ribaldini – vocals (tracks 9–10, 12)
- Johanna Kurkela – vocals (track 16; bonus track)

Production

- Martijn Westerholt – engineering
- Tom Müller – mixing
- Nathan Cairo – mixing
- Svante Forsbäck – mastering
- Ludovico Cioffi – cover art
- Guus Eikens – songwriting

== Charts ==
Chart performance for Dance with the Devil
Chart (2024)	Peak position
UK Album Downloads (Official Charts)	60
UK Independent Albums (Official Charts)	31
UK Rock & Metal Albums (Official Charts)	12
