= The Human Contradiction =

2014 studio album by Delain

Studio album by Delain
- Released: 4 April 2014
- Recorded: 2014
- Studio: Wisseloord Studios and Graveland Studios, Hilversum, Netherlands (drums), Spacelab Studios, Grefrath, Germany (guitars), Guus Eiken headquarters
- Genre: Symphonic metal
- Length: 41:56
- Label: Napalm
- Producer: Martijn Westerholt

Delain studio album chronology
We Are the Others (2012)	The Human Contradiction (2014)	Moonbathers (2016)

Singles from The Human Contradiction
- 1. "Your Body Is a Battleground" Released: 7 March 2014; 2. "Stardust" Released: 2 April 2014; 3. "Sing to Me" Released: 6 May 2015

The Human Contradiction is the fourth studio album by the Dutch symphonic metal band Delain. It was released on 4 April 2014 in Europe, and on 8 April 2014 in North America.

The album features guest appearances from Alissa White-Gluz, Marko Hietala and George Oosthoek.

== Background ==
According to lead singer Charlotte Wessels, the album's title was inspired by Octavia E. Butler's science fiction trilogy Lilith's Brood. 'The Human Contradiction' refers to humans in general being highly intelligent and hierarchically structured at the same time. The songwriting, however, was not influenced by Lilith's Brood but continues the theme of being different that was portrayed by Delain's previous album We Are the Others. It charted at number 25 on the Official Album Charts in their native country of Netherlands, as well as charting at number 44 on the Official Album Charts in the United Kingdom.

== Reception ==
Professional ratings
Review scores
Source	Rating
All About The Rock	8/10
Metal Hammer Germany	5/7
Sonic Seducer	6.15/10

A joint review by 10 Sonic Seducer writers found that The Human Contradiction was a well-produced gothic metal album oriented towards Within Temptation, but without any new impulses. A reviewer for the Decibel magazine wrote, too, that the album contained nothing new, but was well crafted. According to Metal Hammer Germany, The Human Contradiction was in fact different than other releases by Delain in that it contained a tiny musical allowing Charlotte Wessels to present the full range of her voice. The reviewer noted though that the album was "too hard for sophisticated pop, [and] too shallow to have any rocking depth." Matt Farrington for All About The Rock said "It would be nice to see them pushing the boundaries more to see what else can be delivered. That said it would be a tough task for them to deliver a better record than April Rain back in 2009".

== Track listing ==
All lyrics are written by Charlotte Wessels; all music is composed by Guus Eikens, Charlotte Wessels and Martijn Westerholt (except where noted).

No.	Title	Length
1.	"Here Come the Vultures"	6:05
2.	"Your Body Is a Battleground" (featuring Marko Hietala)	3:50
3.	"Stardust"	3:57
4.	"My Masquerade"	3:43
5.	"Tell Me, Mechanist" (featuring George Oosthoek)	4:52
6.	"Sing to Me" (featuring Marko Hietala)	5:09
7.	"Army of Dolls"	4:57
8.	"Lullaby"	4:56
9.	"The Tragedy of the Commons" (featuring Alissa White-Gluz)	4:31
Total length:		41:56

Digipak bonus disc
No.	Title	Writer(s)	Length
10.	"Scarlet"		4:36
11.	"Don't Let Go"		3:56
12.	"My Masquerade" (Live from the My Masquerade concert, Haarlem 8 November 2013)		5:02
13.	"April Rain" (Live from the My Masquerade concert, Haarlem 8 November 2013)	Martijn Westerholt, Charlotte Wessels	4:45
14.	"Go Away" (Live from the My Masquerade concert, Haarlem 8 November 2013)	Martijn Westerholt, Guus Eikens, Charlotte Wessels	3:42
15.	"Sever" (Live from the My Masquerade concert, Haarlem 8 November 2013)	Martijn Westerholt	4:54
16.	"Stay Forever" (Live from the My Masquerade concert, Haarlem 8 November 2013)	Martijn Westerholt, Ronald Landa, Charlotte Wessels	4:31
17.	"Sing to Me" (Orchestra version)		3:41
18.	"Your Body Is a Battleground" (Orchestra version)		3:20
Total length:			38:32

== Personnel ==
=== Delain ===
- Charlotte Wessels – vocals
- Martijn Westerholt – keyboards
- Timo Somers – guitars
- Otto Schimmelpenninck van der Oije – bass
- Sander Zoer – drums

=== Additional musicians ===
- Marko Hietala – clean male vocals (2, 6)
- George Oosthoek – death growls (5)
- Alissa White-Gluz – death growls & clean female backing vocals (9)
- Georg Neuhauser – backing vocals (9)
- Guus Eikens – additional guitars
- Oliver Philipps – additional guitars, arrangements, engineer (vocals)
- Mike Coolen – additional drums
- Ruben Israel – additional drums
- Mikko P. Mustonen – orchestration

=== Production ===
- Martijn Westerholt – production, arrangements
- Arno Krabman – drum engineering
- Ad Sluijter – guitar engineering
- Christian Moos – guitar engineering, mixing
- André Zoer – live recording engineering
- Fredrik Nordström – mixing
- Henrik Udd – mixing
- Ted Jensen – mastering at Sterling Sound, New York
- Das Buro – artwork, design
- Sandra Ludewig – photography

== Charts ==
Chart (2014)	Peak position
Belgian Albums (Ultratop Flanders)	65
Belgian Albums (Ultratop Wallonia)	90
Dutch Albums (Album Top 100)	25
French Albums (SNEP)	106
German Albums (Offizielle Top 100)	40
Japanese Albums (Oricon)	185
Scottish Albums (OCC)	52
Swiss Albums (Schweizer Hitparade)	24
UK Albums (OCC)	44
UK Independent Albums (OCC)	8
UK Rock Chart (OCC)	2
US Heatseekers Albums (Billboard)	8
