= Lunar Prelude =

2016 EP by Delain

EP by Delain
- Released: 19 February 2016
- Recorded: 2015–2016
- Genre: Symphonic metal
- Length: 35:23
- Label: Napalm Records
- Producer: Martijn Westerholt

Delain EP chronology
Lunar Prelude (2016)	Hunter's Moon (2019)

Singles from Lunar Prelude
- 1. "Suckerpunch" Released: 7 February 2016

Professional ratings
Review scores
Source	Rating
Sputnikmusic	3/5 stars

Lunar Prelude is the first EP by the Dutch symphonic metal band Delain. It was released on 19 February 2016. This is the first album with Ruben Israel on drums and Merel Bechtold on guitar. The track "Turn the Lights Out" is inspired by Neil Gaiman's The Sandman.

== Critical reception ==
Sputnik Music gave the album 3-stars, but wrote "Nothing on Lunar Prelude is going to surprise you. Symphonic metal with huge hooks is the order of the day. If you like Delain, you’ll find plenty to enjoy here, too. If you don’t like this band, there isn’t a single thing Lunar Prelude can do to change your mind."

== Track listing ==
All lyrics are written by Charlotte Wessels; all music is composed by Martijn Westerholt, Charlotte Wessels and Guus Eikens, except "Turn the Lights Out", co-written by Hendrik Jan de Jong

No.	Title	Length
1.	"Suckerpunch"	4:10
2.	"Turn the Lights Out"	4:15
3.	"Don't Let Go" (New Version)	3:57
4.	"Lullaby" (Live 2015)	5:15
5.	"Stardust" (Live 2015)	4:13
6.	"Here Come the Vultures" (Live 2015)	5:40
7.	"Army of Dolls" (Live 2015)	5:27
8.	"Suckerpunch" (Orchestral Version)	2:31
Total length:		35:23

== Personnel ==
Adapted from the EP booklet:

Delain

- Charlotte Wessels – vocals
- Timo Somers – lead guitar
- Merel Bechtold – rhythm guitar
- Otto Schimmelpenninck van der Oije – bass
- Martijn Westerholt – keyboards
- Ruben Israel – drums

Technical

- Martijn Westerholt – producer
- Ted Jensen – mastering
- Arno Krabman – drum engineering on "Suckerpunch", "Turn the Lights Out" and "Don't Let Go"
- Bas Trumpie and Imre Beerends – guitar and backing vocals recording on "Suckerpunch" and "Turn the Lights Out"; mixing on "Turn the Lights Out"
- Guido Aalbers – vocal recordings on "Suckerpunch" and "Turn the Lights Out"
- Oliver Philipps – additional guitars and additional vocal engineering
- Mikko P. Mustonen – classical arrangements
- Fredik Nordstrom and Henrik Udd – mixing on "Suckerpunch" and "Don't Let Go"
- Christian Moos – mixing on all live tracks
- Glenn Arthur – cover art
- Wandy van den Bogert-Elberse – artwork design
- Sandra Ludewig – photos
