= Blaricum =

Municipality and village in Netherlands

- Municipality and village
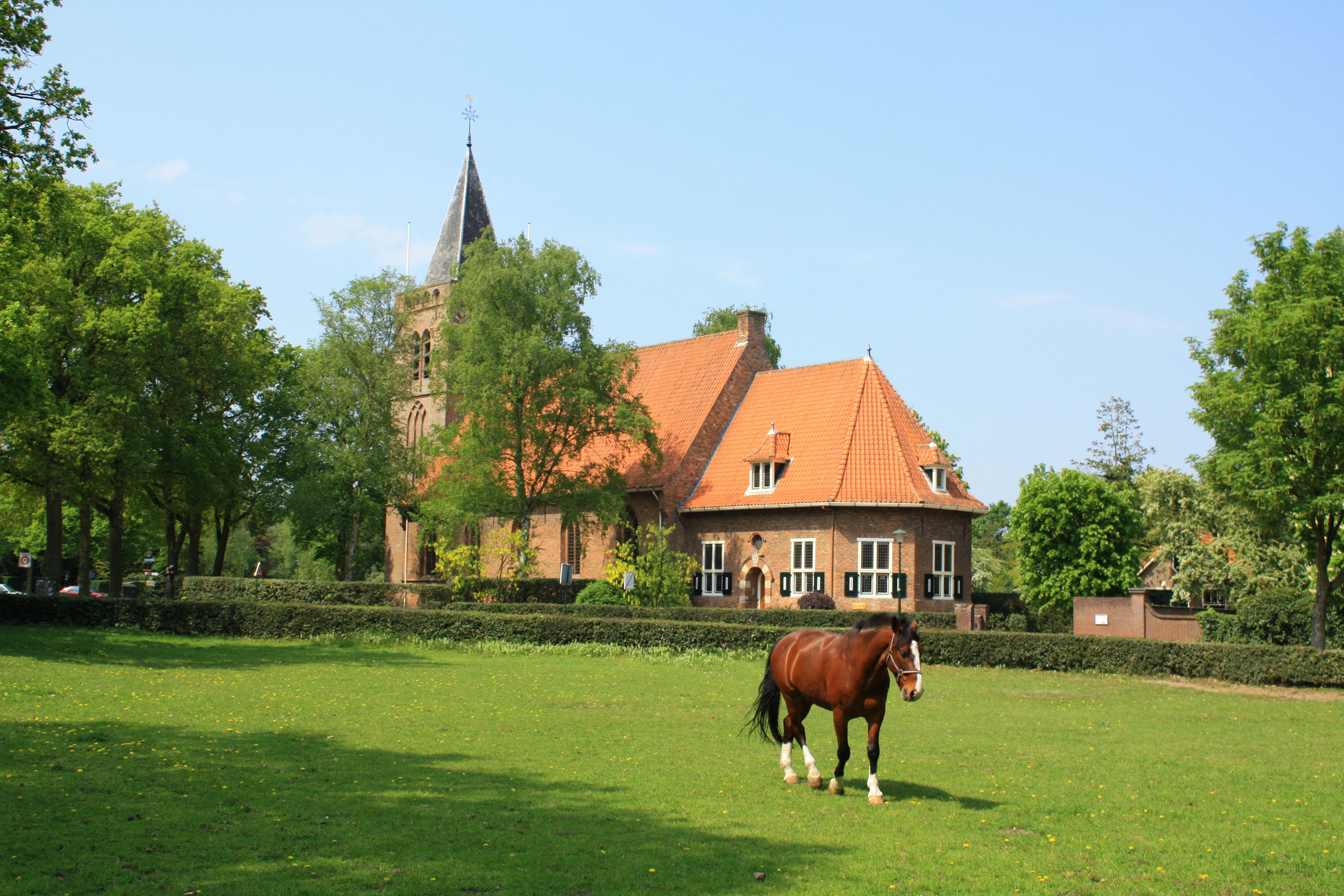
- Church in Blaricum

- Flag Coat of arms

- Location in North Holland
- Coordinates: 52°16′N 5°15′E
- Country: Netherlands
- Province: North Holland

Government
  - Body: Municipal council
  - Mayor: Barbara de Reijke (VVD)

Area
  - Total: 15.56 km^{2} (6.01 sq mi)
  - Land: 11.11 km^{2} (4.29 sq mi)
  - Water: 4.45 km^{2} (1.72 sq mi)
- Elevation: 4 m (13 ft)

Population (January 2021)
  - Total: 11,954
  - Density: 1,076/km^{2} (2,790/sq mi)
- Demonym: Blaricummer
- Time zone: UTC+1 (CET)
  - Summer (DST): UTC+2 (CEST)
- Postcode: 1260–1261
- Area code: 035
- Website: www.blaricum.nl

Blaricum (Dutch pronunciation: [ˈblaːrikʏm]) is a municipality and village in the province of North Holland, the Netherlands. It is part of the region of Gooiland and part of the Metropolitan Region Amsterdam. It is known for its many monumental farm buildings, local cafes and restaurants, nature, several annual community events, and extensive up-market residential areas.

According to statistics published by the Dutch land registry office in February 2011, Blaricum was the most expensive location to purchase a house in the Netherlands. The average home in Blaricum cost €800,000, an increase of 12% on the previous year. In 2025, this price had risen to an average of €1,100,000 and it again became the most expensive municipality, dethroning Laren.

Blaricum is a popular residence of many Dutch celebrities, including Rene Froger, Anita Meijer, Paul de Leeuw, Dennis Bergkamp, Gordon, Jerney Kaagman, John de Mol, Anita Witzier and Marco Borsato.

== Districts ==
The municipality of Blaricum consists of the following districts:

- Dorp
- Bijvanck
- Blaricummermeent

== Topography ==
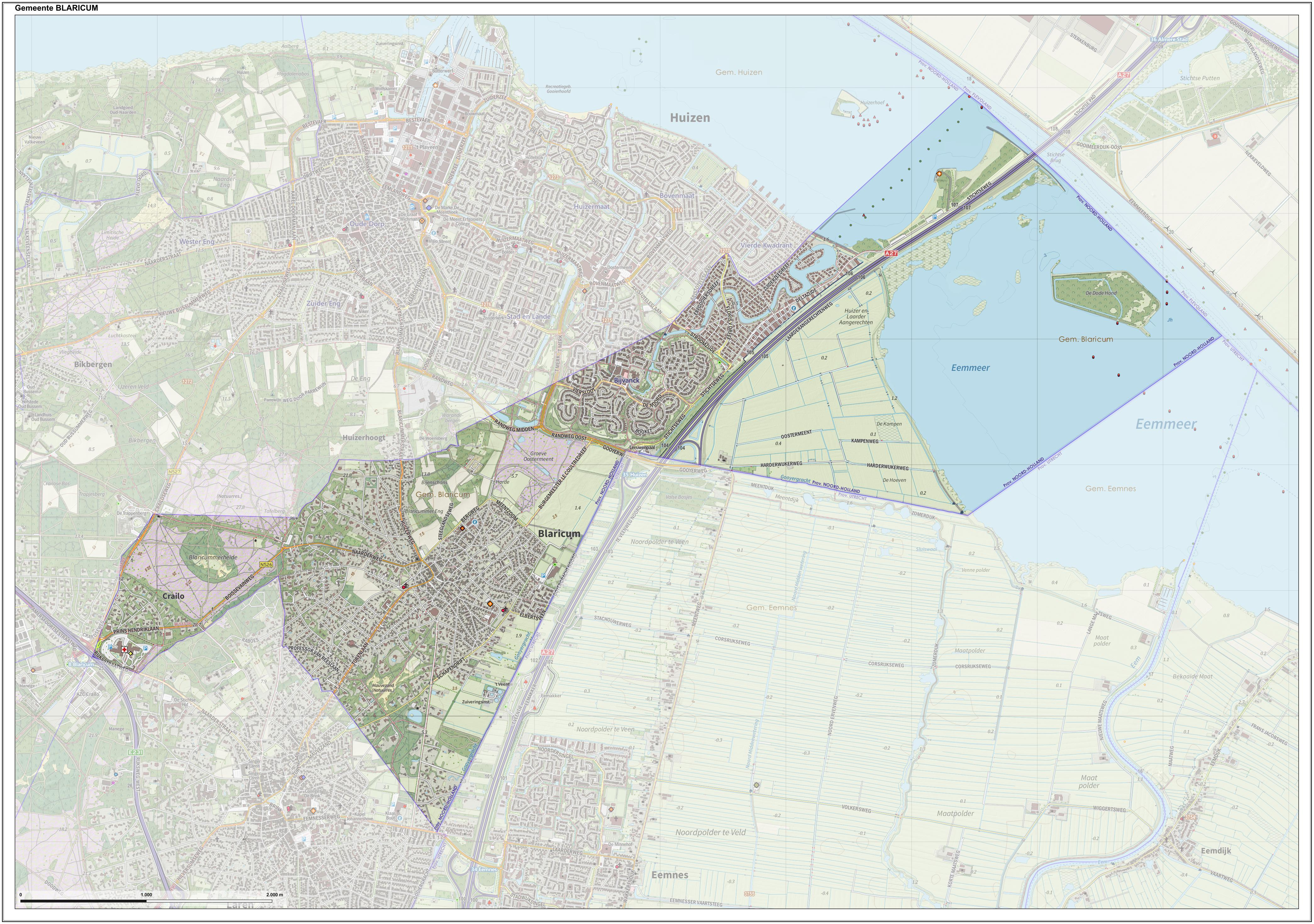

Dutch Topographic map of the municipality of Blaricum, June 2015.

== Local government ==
The municipal council of Blaricum consists of 15 seats, which at the 2026 elections divided as follows:

- VVD - 3 seats
- Hart voor Blaricum - 3 seats
- De Blaricumse Partij - 3 seats
- D66 - 2 seats
- Het Geluid van Blaricum - 2 seats
- CDA - 1 seat
- GroenLinks / PVDA - 1 seat

== History ==
The Tolstoyan community De International Broederschap was located in Blaricum from 1900 to 1903.

== Notable people ==
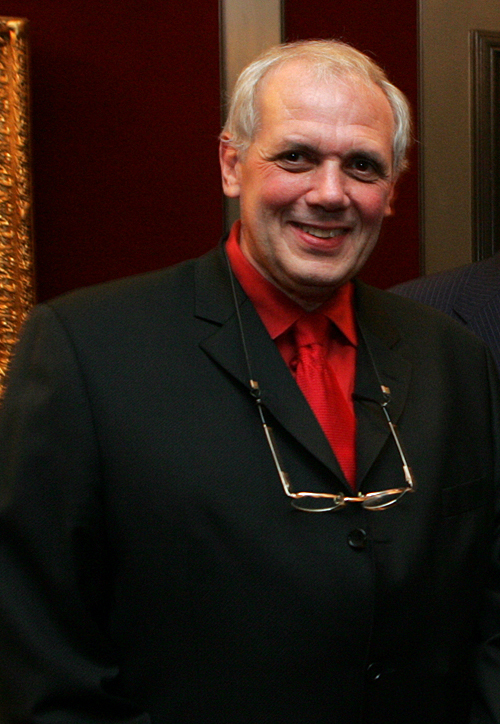
Dick Bakker, 2010

- Mellie Uyldert (1908 in Blaricum – 2009) a New Age writer, alternative healer, occultist, and astrologer
- Max Croiset (1912 in Blaricum – 1993) an actor
- Dick Bakker (born 1947 in Blaricum) a composer, conductor and music producer
- Merel Bechtold (born 1992 in Blaricum) a guitarist
- Meau (born 2000) singer-songwriter, influencer

=== Sport ===
- Ton Richter (1919 in Blaricum – 2009) a field hockey player, team bronze medallist at the 1948 Summer Olympics
- Robert-Jan Derksen (born 1974) a professional golfer, lives in Blaricum
- Selena Piek (born 1991 in Blaricum) a badminton player, team gold medalist at the 2019 European Games
- Pieter Schothorst (born 1992), a racing driver
- Steijn Schothorst (born 1994) a racing driver, who competed in the GP3 Series.
- Tristan Gooijer professional football player

== Gallery ==
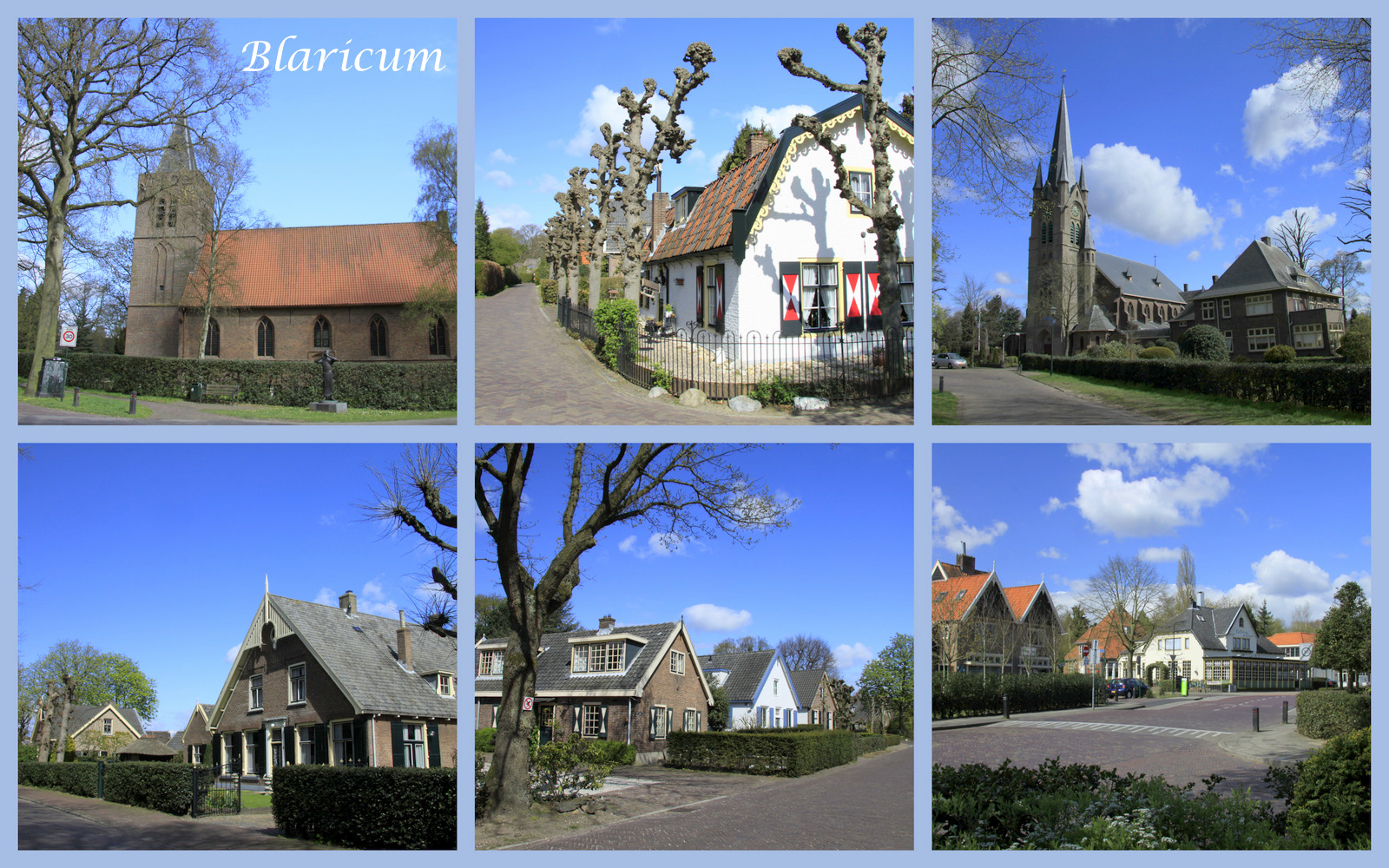
Montage of Blaricum in the summer
