= Soaring Highs and Brutal Lows: The Voices of Women in Metal =

Documentary about female metal singers

- Film poster
- Directed by: Mark Harwood
- Written by: Mark Harwood
- Produced by: Mark Harwood
- Starring: Floor Jansen; Simone Simons; Charlotte Wessels; Anneke van Giersbergen; Marcela Bovio; Alissa White-Gluz; Kobra Paige; Doro Pesch
- Cinematography: Mark Harwood
- Edited by: Daniel Gradilla; Mark Harwood
- Music by: Ruben Wijga
- Production company: Rising Moon Productions
- Release date: October 15, 2015
- Running time: 93 minutes
- Countries: Netherlands; United States; Germany; Canada; Belgium
- Language: English

Soaring Highs and Brutal Lows: The Voices of Women in Metal (also known as Soaring Highs and Brutal Lows) is a 2015 Canadian documentary film, directed by Mark Harwood, that follows the personal journeys of women from different generations who are prominent vocalists inside the heavy metal music genre. It premiered theatrically in Eindhoven, Netherlands on October 15, 2015 and is distributed by the National Film Board of Canada.

== Background ==
According to director Mark Harwood, the idea for making the film came from the absence of documentaries regarding the journey of women inside the heavy metal music genre, as there were a great number of documentaries regarding other aspects of this extreme type of music. From this point, the director wanted to depict the musical and personal trajectory of these women and what drove them on creating their art. Although some structural changes had to be done and new topics for discussion and exploring surfaced, the director managed to follow most parts of his original ideas. The movie combines interviews and parts of live performances in an effort to present the work of the artists in balance with their stories. Harwood attempted this balance in order for the film to appeal to the wider public and not be exclusive to metal enthusiasts. Archival footage was another device adopted on the film.

== Cast ==
- Floor Jansen
- Simone Simons
- Charlotte Wessels
- Anneke van Giersbergen
- Marcela Bovio
- Alissa White-Gluz
- Kobra Paige
- Doro Pesch
