= Delain =

Dutch symphonic metal band

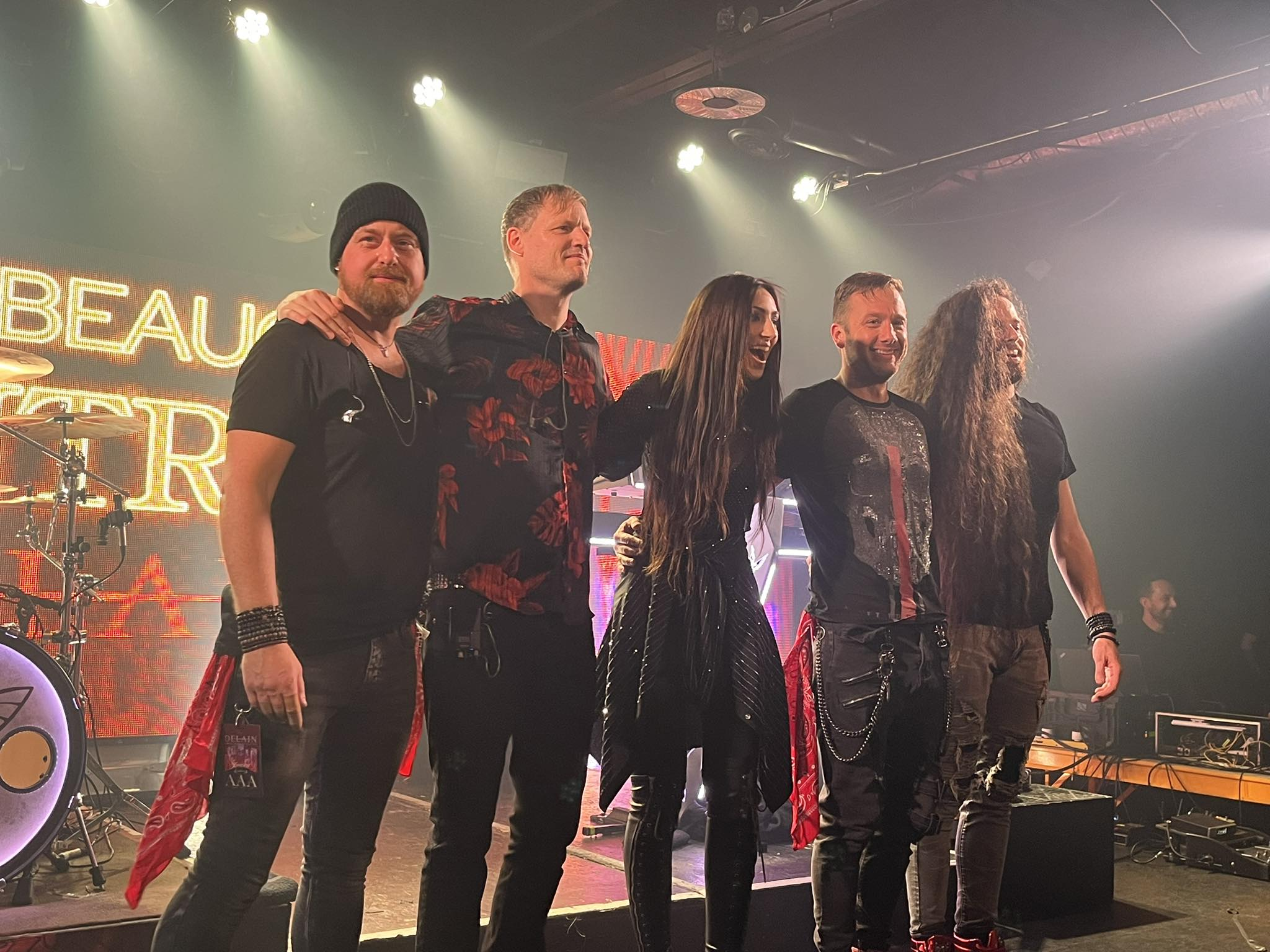
- Delain in Montreal 2025; (L–R): Sander Zoer, Martijn Westerholt, Diana Leah, Ronald Landa, Ludovico Cioffi.

Background information
- Origin: Zwolle, Overijssel, Netherlands
- Genre: Symphonic metal
- Years active: 2002; 2005–present
- Labels: CNR; Roadrunner; Napalm
- Members: Martijn Westerholt; Sander Zoer; Ronald Landa; Ludovico Cioffi
- Past members: See former members
- Website: www.delain.nl

Delain is a Dutch symphonic metal band formed in 2002 by keyboardist Martijn Westerholt. After his departure from Within Temptation in 2001, Westerholt formed Delain the following year, intending for the band to be solely a project, but stopped after the release of one demo. In 2005, Westerholt restarted Delain alongside singer Charlotte Wessels, and released the debut studio album, Lucidity, in September 2006. The band began to perform publicly following the positive reception the album received.

After the release of the band's sixth studio album, Apocalypse & Chill, in February 2020, the members parted ways the following year, while Westerholt stated he would continue the band as a solo project. In June 2021, Westerholt announced that there would be a new lineup involving former and new members, with Diana Leah later being announced as the new lead vocalist in August 2022. Following the new lineup's formation, the band released their seventh studio album, Dark Waters, in February 2023. Following its release, Leah left the band in October 2026.

As of 2026, Delain have released seven studio albums, three EPs, one live album and nineteen music videos.

== History ==
=== 2002–2010: Early years, Lucidity and April Rain ===
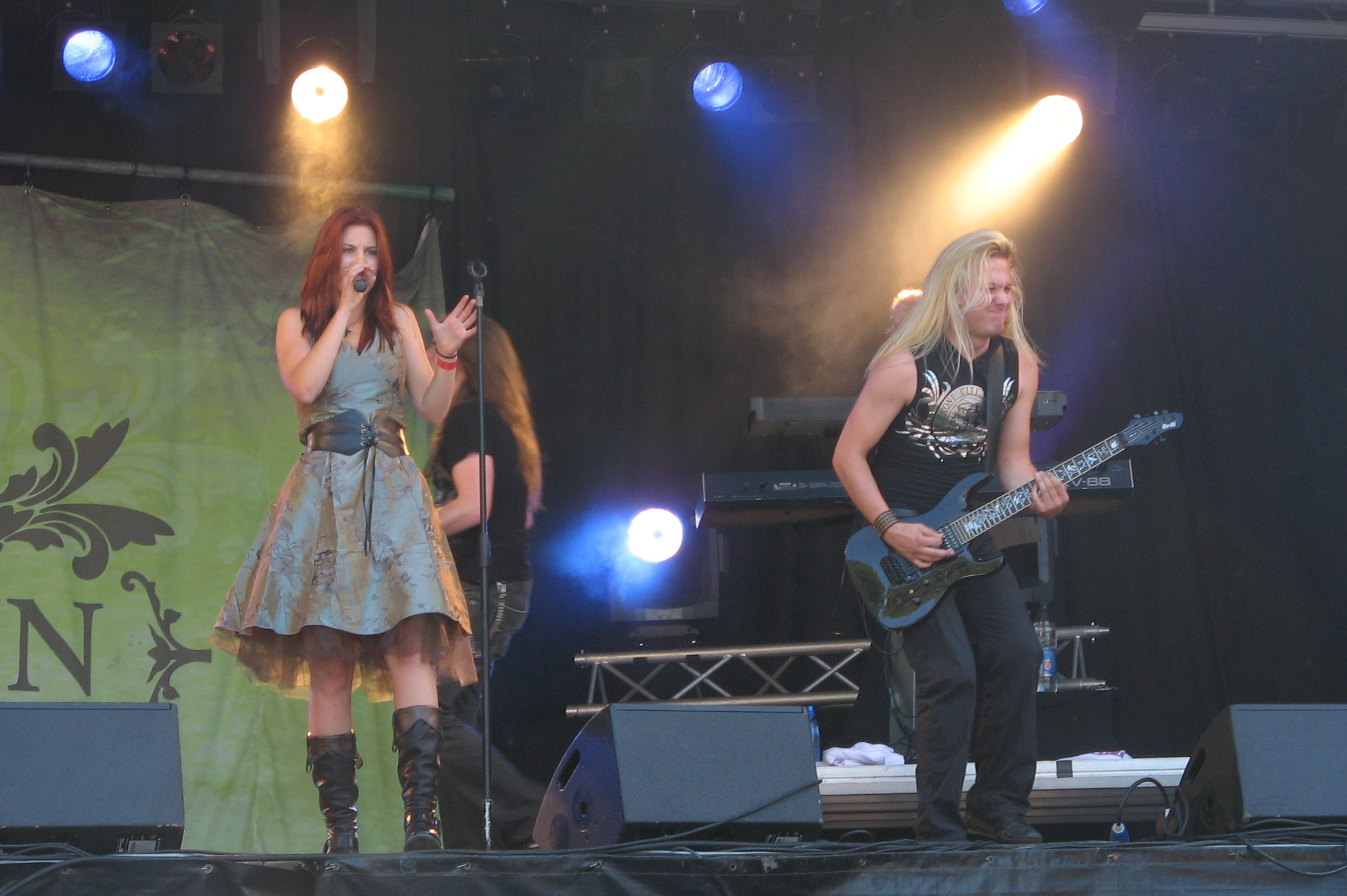
Delain performing in 2007

In 2002, Westerholt formed Delain, after he was forced to leave Within Temptation in 2001 due to Pfeiffer's disease. The name of the band came from the "Kingdom of Delain" in Stephen King's novel, The Eyes of the Dragon. In the same year, they independently released the demo Amenity. After the demo, Westerholt temporarily left the project behind but continued to write music.

In 2005, he joined with Charlotte Wessels, and was signed to Roadrunner Records. At the time, the band was envisioned as a musical project featuring a host of guest musicians, and not as a live band.

Lucidity brought to fruition Westerholt's dream of a musical project, featuring many well-known musicians from the metal community: Marko Hietala, Liv Kristine, Ariën van Weesenbeek, Ad Sluijter, George Oosthoek and Guus Eikens, Sharon den Adel and Jan Yrlund.

Despite many delays, Lucidity was released in September 2006, to generally positive reviews. The album spawned three singles: "Frozen", "See Me in Shadow" and "The Gathering", and the response to the album allowed Delain to tour in support in the Netherlands and neighboring countries. Rob van der Loo, Ronald Landa and Sander Zoer were added on bass, guitar and drums respectively to round out the live band.

At the end of 2007, Delain announced that they were working on their second album. New songs from the album – "Stay Forever" and "Start Swimming" – were added to the band's setlist in early 2008. Their second album, April Rain, was released on 9 February 2009. The lead single was the title track, "April Rain", followed by "Stay Forever". The band toured extensively in support of the album, visiting many new countries such as the United States and Mexico, as well as performing at high-profile festivals in Europe, including Hellfest, Lowlands, Wacken Open Air and Sonisphere. In February 2010, Delain announced they had started working on their third album, and that bassist Rob van der Loo would leave the band the same year due to time constraints. In March, Otto Schimmelpenninck van der Oije was announced as Rob's successor. On 4 October 2010, Delain announced they were to part company with guitarist Ewout Pieters. Timo Somers was announced as his replacement on 17 April 2011.

=== 2011–2013: We Are the Others ===
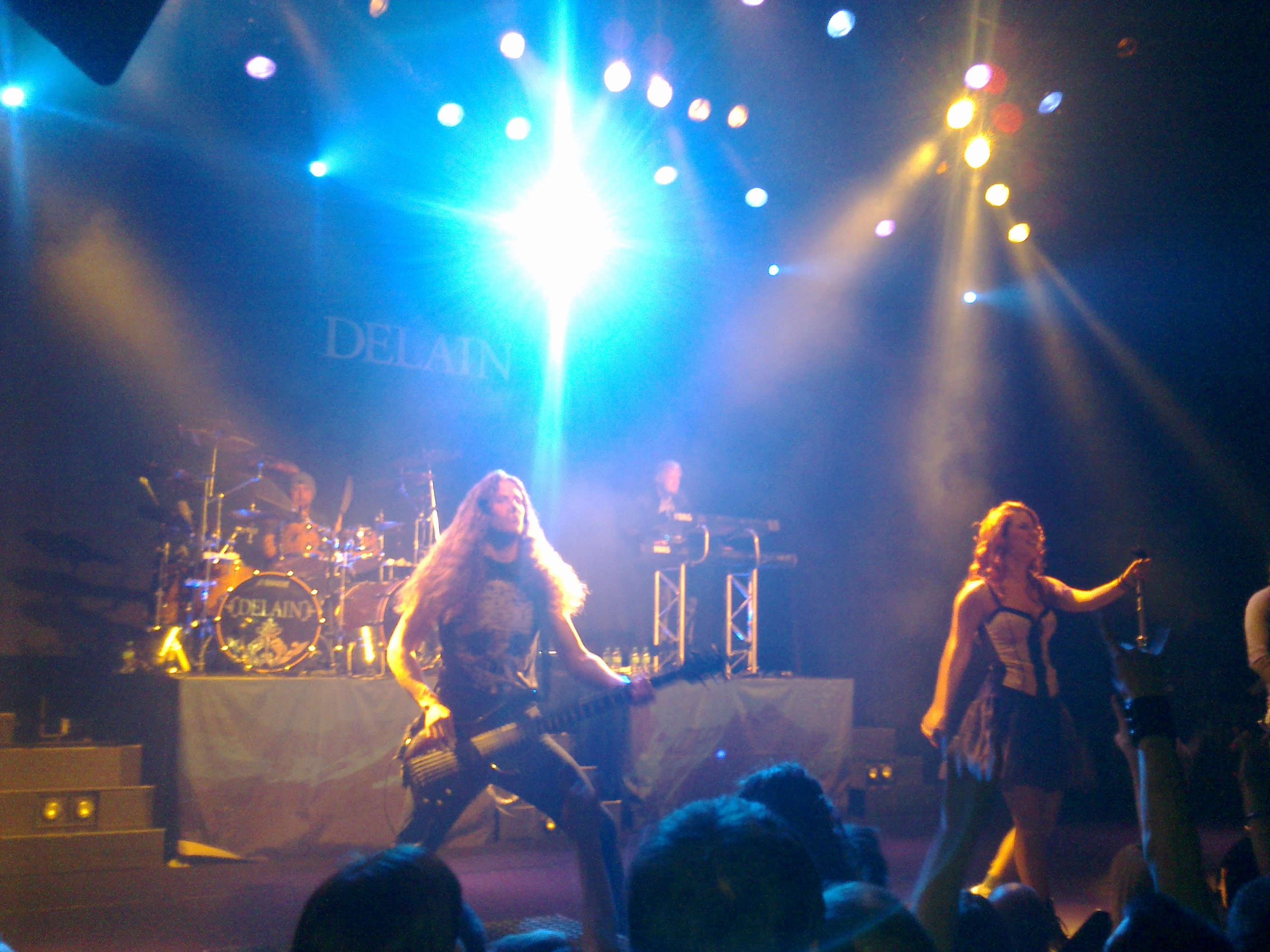
Delain performing in Strasbourg, 2011

During their 2011 live shows, Delain debuted three new songs — "Manson" (later renamed to "Mother Machine"), "Get the Devil Out of Me" and "Milk and Honey" — from their third album, We Are the Others. In an interview with Sonic Cathedral, Wessels discussed the inspiration she drew from the Sophie Lancaster case:

I remember when I first heard about it … it wasn't on Dutch news, I just heard about it through Internet networks and the goth scene … there was this movie made about it, a short film of about four minutes. I saw it, and I just cried. It's so incredibly sad! After seeing the movie, I didn't really DO anything with it until we were working on "We Are The Others." But the basic idea of the lyrics was there. It was just supposed to be a song about "we are the others" and a feeling of togetherness. On the one hand, being proud of whoever you are, whether you divert from the norm in whatever way you divert from the norm. But on the other hand, it is also kind of a song for "others". We just wanted a song about acceptance.

Originally intended for release in early 2012, the album's release date was unknown due to Warner Music's purchase of Roadrunner Records. However, it was announced via a Facebook message on the band official page that the album would be released on 1 June 2012 with the album's first single, 'Get the Devil Out of Me' being released on 13 April 2012 via CNR Music, who took over Delain from Warner Music. The second single from the album was the title track, 'We Are the Others'.

Delain released a compilation album entitled Interlude on 1 May 2013, that includes new songs, covers, live tracks, special versions of previous songs and a bonus DVD.

=== 2014–2020: The Human Contradiction to Apocalypse & Chill ===
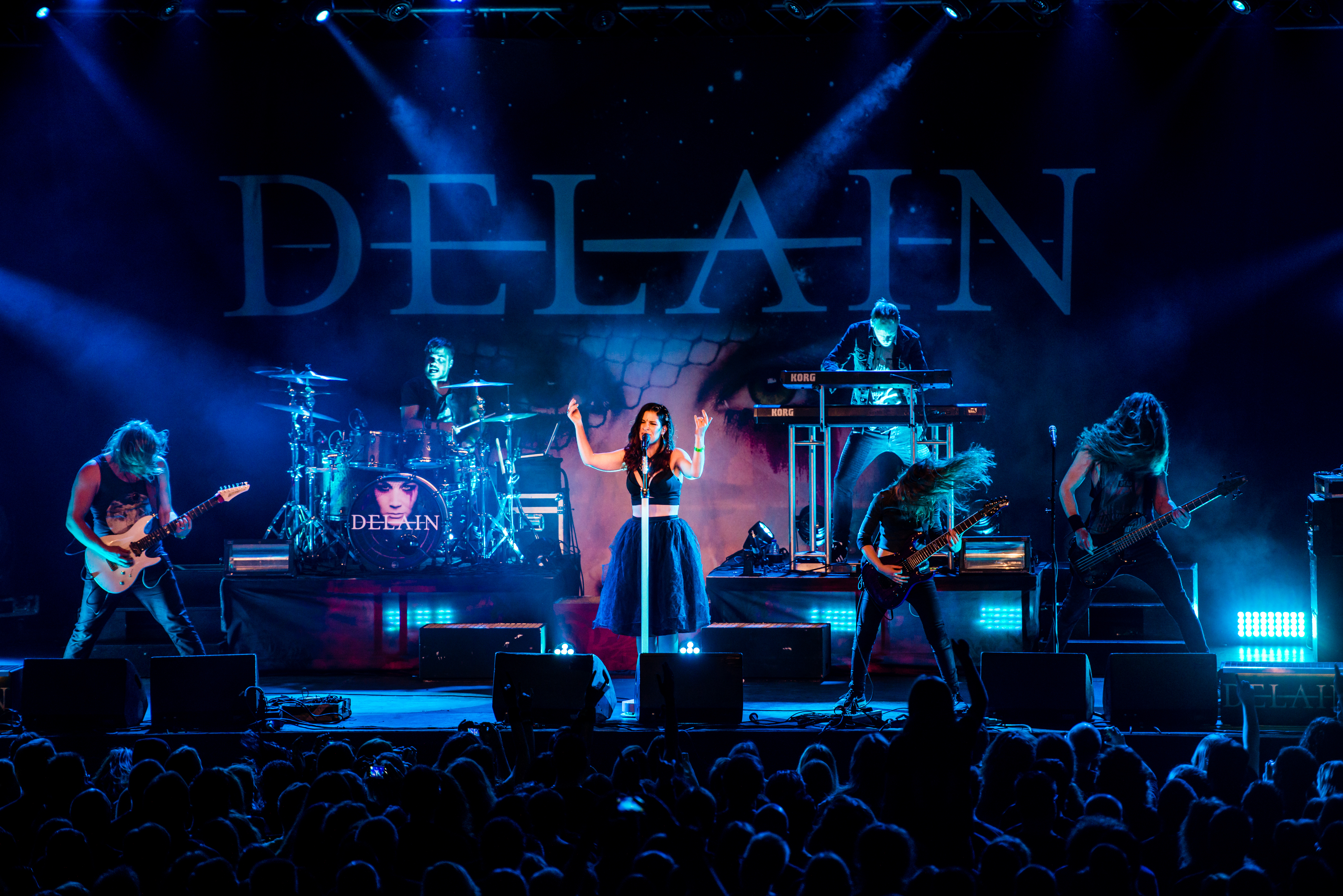
Delain performing at Epic Metal Fest in 2015

On 23 January 2014, Delain announced that they would release a new album entitled The Human Contradiction. It was released on 5 April 2014 in Europe, and on 8 April 2014 in North America.

Drummer Sander Zoer stepped down from the band on 4 June 2014 for personal reasons; though he would continue working behind the scenes of Delain. Ruben Israel was announced at the same time as his replacement.

The band brought with them Merel Bechtold as a second guitarist for their UK tour in November 2014. Bassist Otto Schimmelpenninck van der Oije suffered an injury on 26 November 2014, when he was accidentally hit by a streamer cannon, causing his left testicle to rupture. This incident was said to be caused by uncertain stage positioning, as there were six people onstage instead of the usual five. While he was recovering, the band used pre-recorded bass parts. No permanent damage was done, and Schimmelpenninck van der Oije resumed touring in January 2015. Merel Bechtold filled in for guitarist Timo Somers until February, due to Somers' full schedule.

Delain toured with Sabaton and Battle Beast, and also North America with Sabaton as support for Nightwish for the first half of 2015 and returned to Latin America during October as support of them. Delain toured as support again for Nightwish in North America in 2016 with Sonata Arctica. This made it the fourth year in a row the band had toured in the United States and Canada.

On 19 October 2015, Delain made recurring touring guitarist Merel Bechtold a permanent member.

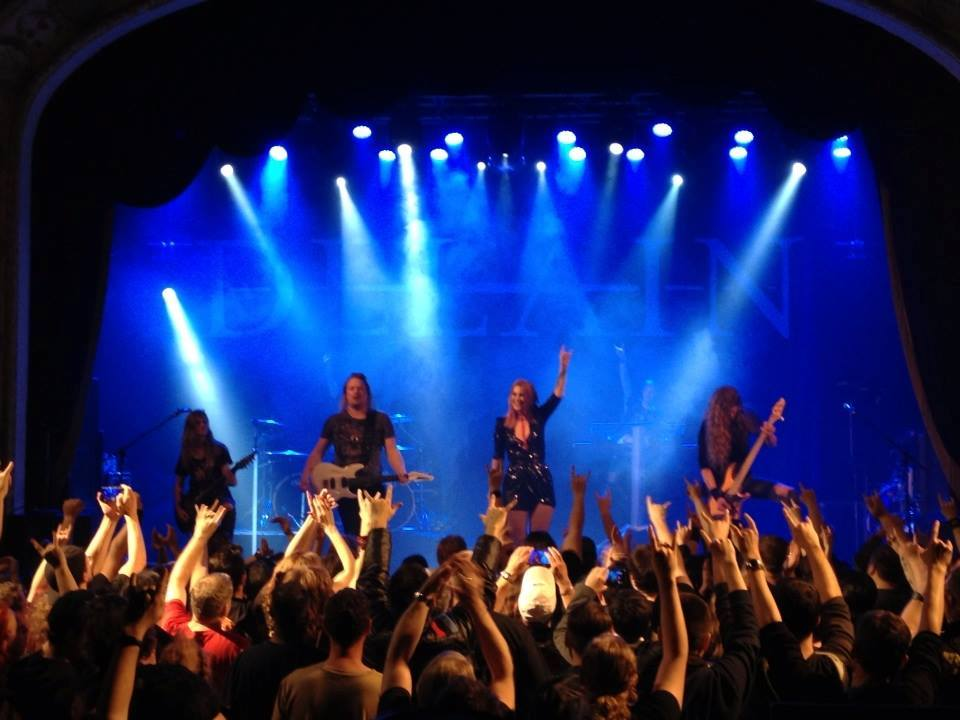
Delain performing in 2017

Delain announced an eight track EP of new and live songs named Lunar Prelude. The EP was released on 19 February 2016. Their first single, "Suckerpunch", of the EP was released on 5 February.

The band announced a new album of ten original songs and one "Queen" cover named Moonbathers. The record was released on 26 August 2016.

Delain's first live video album, A Decade of Delain: Live at Paradiso was filmed at the Paradiso in Amsterdam, Netherlands for the band's 10th anniversary on 10 December 2016. It was released on 27 October 2017.

On 30 August 2018, Joey de Boer was made a permanent member of Delain after filling in for Ruben Israel, who left the band in October 2017.

Delain announced a new EP titled Hunter's Moon on 13 December 2018. The EP was released on 22 February 2019. "Masters of Destiny", the first single off of the EP was released on 11 January 2019 along with a music video.

Merel Bechtold announced on 16 June 2019 that she was amicably leaving the band to pursue other musical interests. Her last show with Delain took place at Graspop Metal Meeting on 23 June 2019.

On 27 September 2019, "Burning Bridges", the first single off of the album was released, which made its debut days before during their North America tour. On 15 November 2019, the second single off of the album, "One Second", was released.

The band announced the title of their sixth studio album, Apocalypse & Chill, on 29 November 2019. It was released on 7 February 2020.

During the COVID-19 pandemic, the band was nominated by Alissa White-Gluz for a benefit livestream concert called Together at Home. Wessels and Somers both participated and did an acoustic version of songs and were the final performers of the livestream nominations.

=== 2021–present: Lineup changes, Dark Waters and upcoming eighth studio album ===
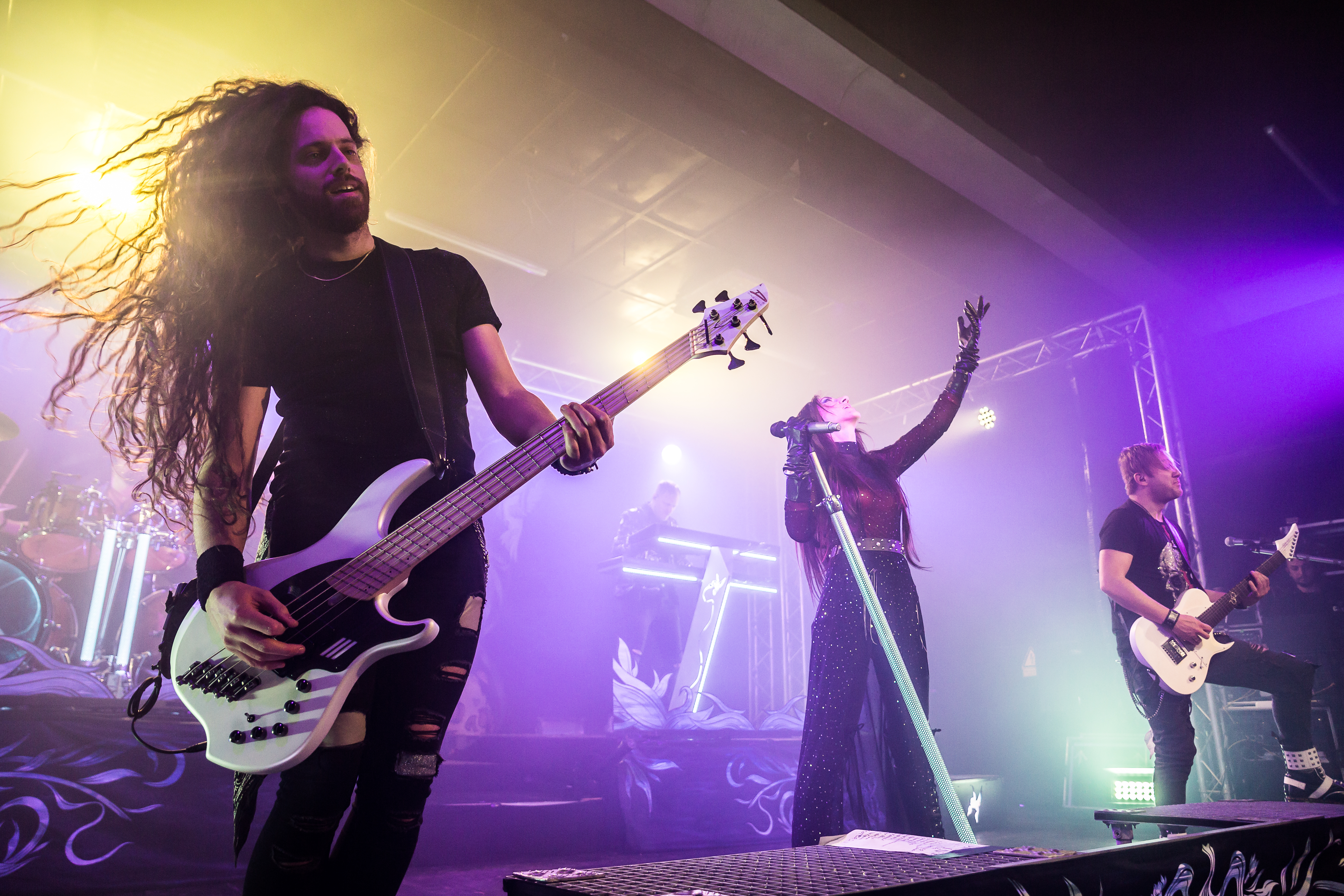
Delain performing in Leipzig in 2024

Delain's lineup had dissolved on 15 February 2021, and initially was stated that it would be continuing as a solo project of Westerholt's who stated that he would "keep Delain alive". In the statement, he said: "Delain will live on. The others have chosen to pursue different paths. I have decided to keep Delain alive by continuing on with writing and producing the music for Delain as I always have. I started Delain as a project in 2002 and for the next album I will take it back to a project form, releasing music with special guests. As it looks now many familiar faces will be returning to join me on this journey." Wessels moved forward with her solo career, but wished the other departing members and the fans well in a statement:

"I hope that Delain remains a positive force in everyone's lives. We Are The Others, always will be, and none of this changes that."

On 9 June 2021, Westerholt stated in an interview that the band would continue to be a live entity that would consist of new and former members. He continued on to state that there would be a lot of Delain DNA in the new lineup.

It was announced on 28 June 2021 that Sander Zoer who previously was Delain's drummer, had returned as the first member for the new lineup of the band. On 12 July 2021, Delain reintroduced Ronald Landa who was the band's original guitarist up until April Rain, as their guitarist. On 28 February 2022, it was announced that former bassist Rob van der Loo would be featured as a guest musician for the album. On 19 May 2022, Ludovico Cioffi joined the band as the new bassist. While announcing that they would return to performing shows in November 2022, the band released the new single, "The Quest and the Curse", on 9 August 2022, as well as announcing their new lead vocalist, Diana Leah. The band's new lineup performed for the first time in Aarburg, Switzerland for the Riverside festival on 27 August 2022. The second single, "Beneath", which was performed by the band in Zwolle was released on 29 November 2022. Simultaneously on the same day of the single's release, the band also announced the title of their seventh studio album, Dark Waters, which was released on 10 February 2023. On 10 January 2023, the third single along with a music video in support of it was released for the song, "Moth to a Flame".

To support the release of Dark Waters, the band toured Europe in April and May 2023 with Xandria and Illumishade, followed by a North American tour in September 2023 with Visions of Atlantis.

On 5 September 2024, the band released the single "Dance with the Devil", and simultaneously announced the Dance with the Devil EP, which was released on 8 November 2024. Two other singles were released in support of the EP, a live version of "Moth to a Flame", and "The Reaping". Delain toured the United Kingdom and Ireland on the month of the EP's release, followed by a North American tour in March 2025 with Xandria and Edge of Paradise. After two performances in Amstelveen and Enschede in October 2025, the band took a year off from touring to focus on songwriting for their upcoming eighth studio album.

On 19 October 2026, the band announced that Diana Leah had left from the band, and rather than look for another lead vocalist, would collaborate with different vocalists for future releases and shows. The next day, the band released the first single from the upcoming studio album, "We Are Fire" which features Fabienne Erni, Paolo Ribaldini and Noa Gruman.

The band is set to tour in Europe in February 2027 alongside Marko Hietala, and joined by the support acts Infected Rain and Persefone.

== Band members ==
Delain live at Wacken Open Air 2023

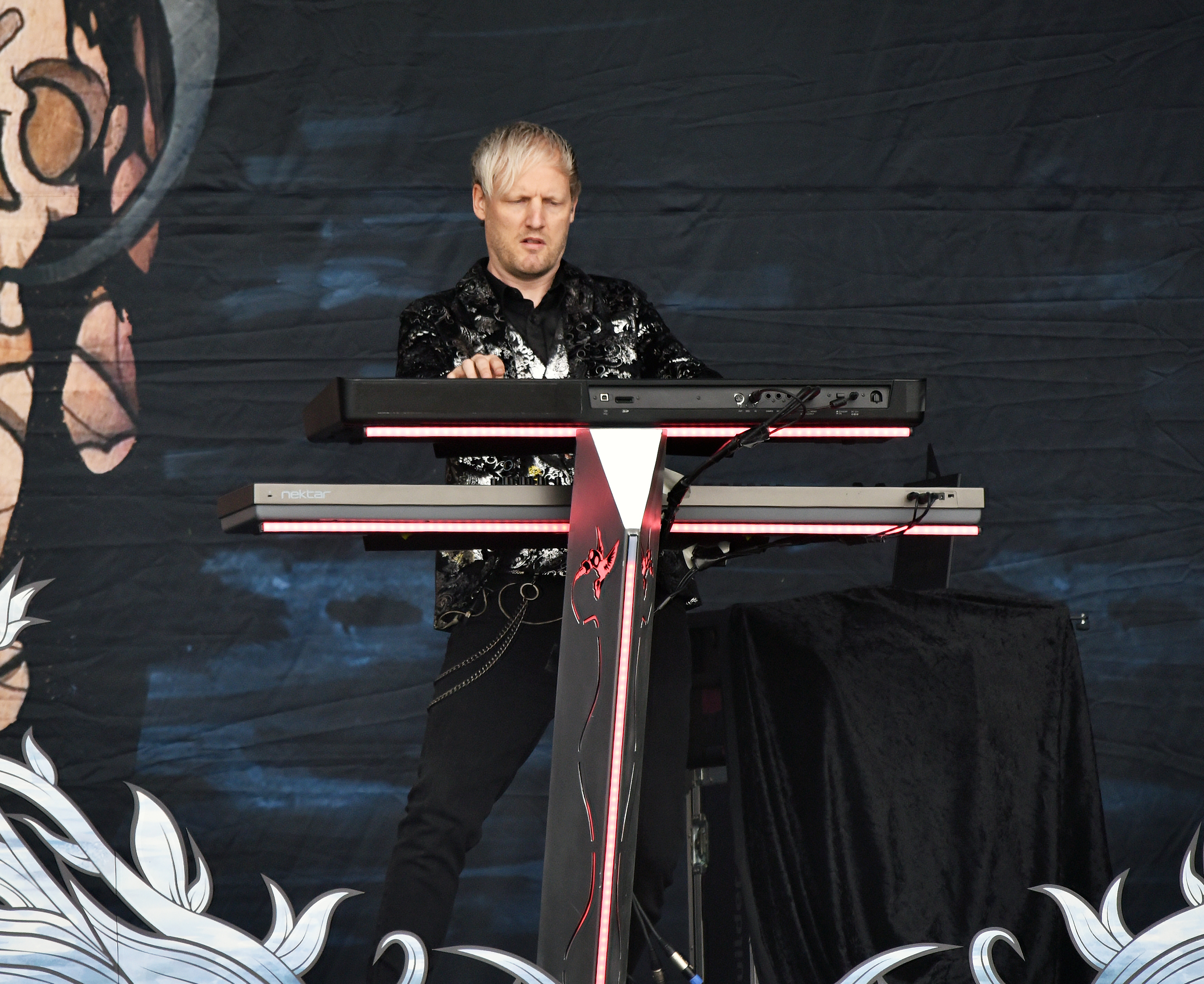
Martijn Westerholt

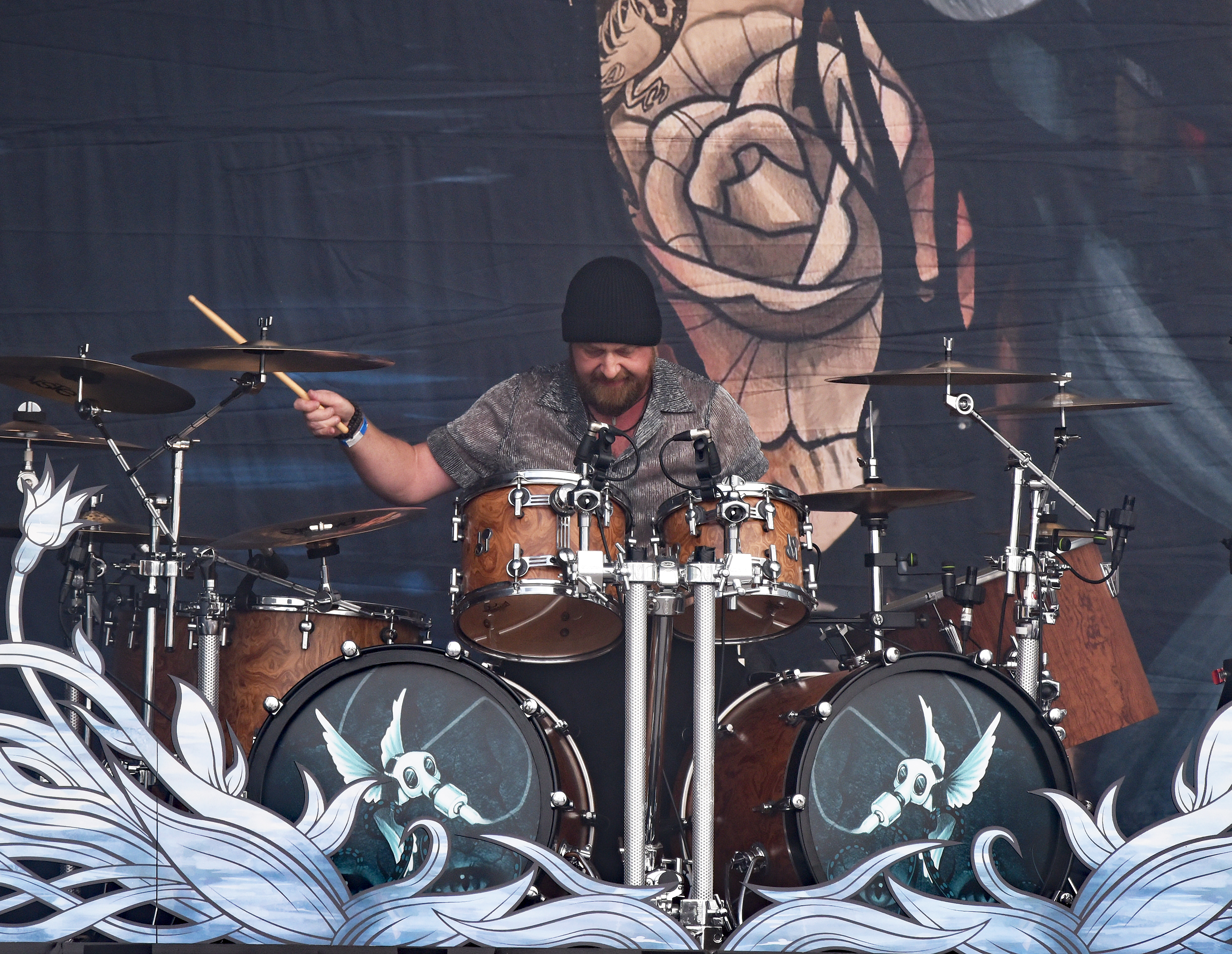
Sander Zoer

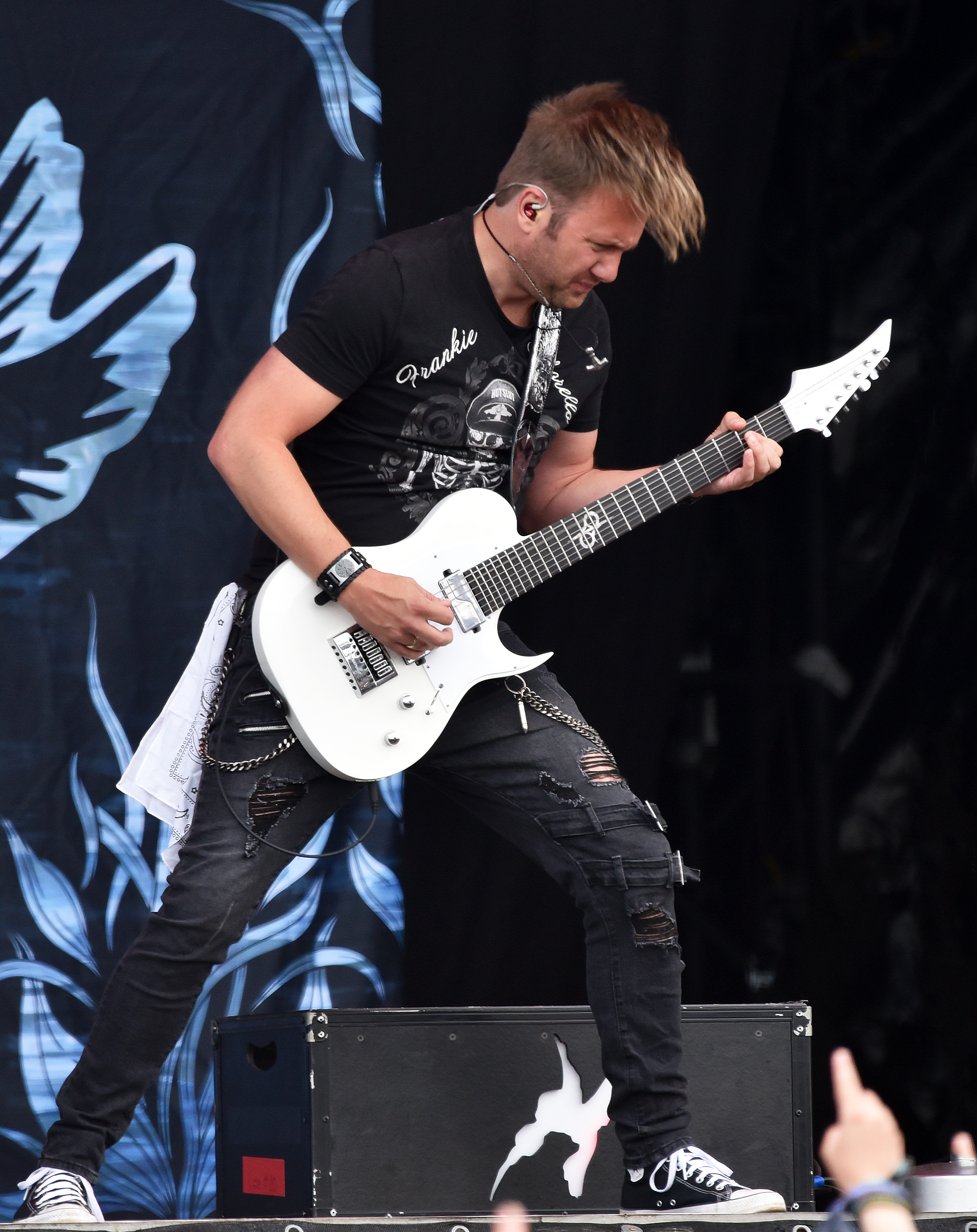
Ronald Landa

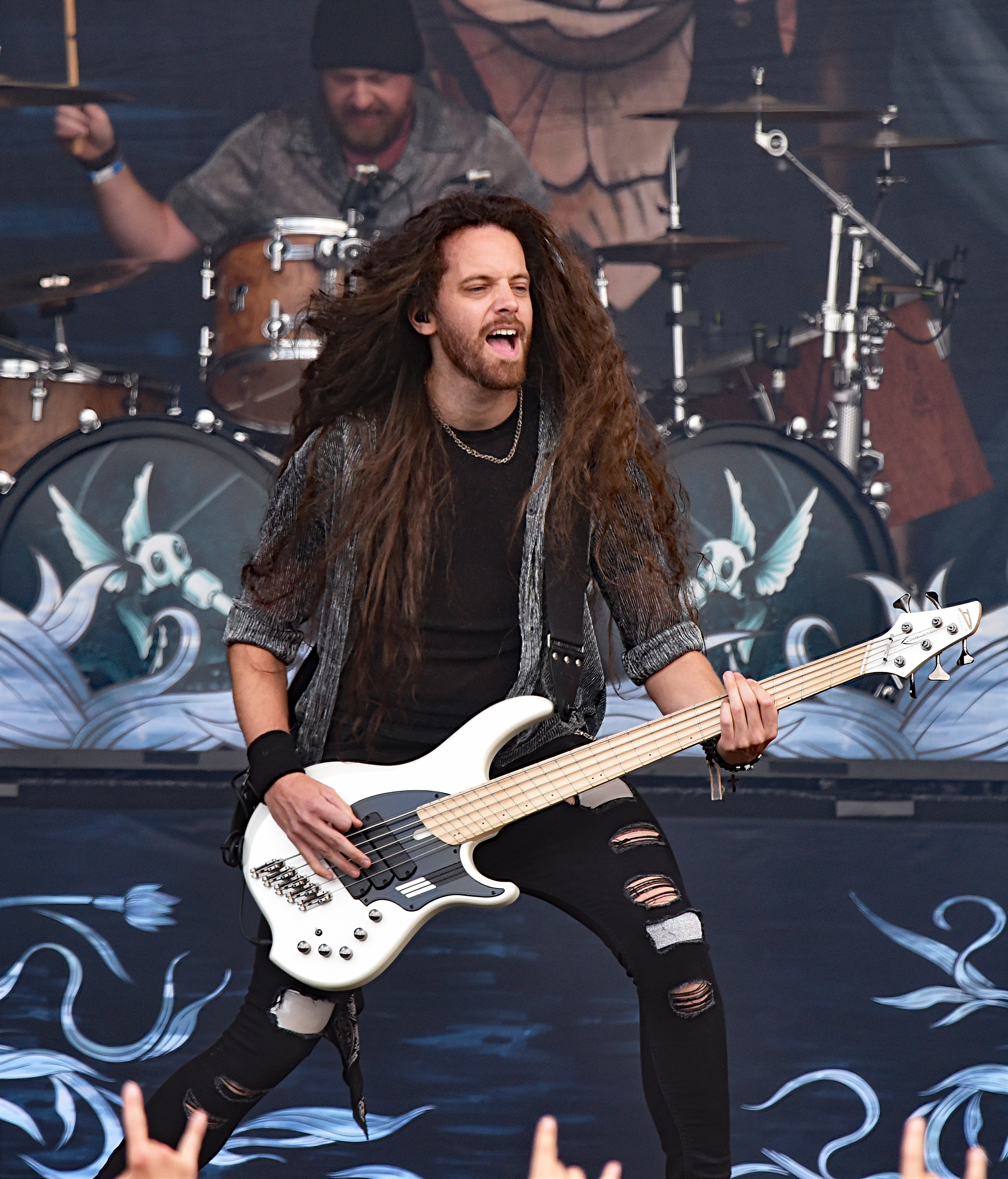
Ludovico Cioffi

=== Current ===
- Martijn Westerholt – keyboards (2002, 2005–present)
- Sander Zoer – drums (2006–2014, 2021–present)
- Ronald Landa – guitars, backing vocals, harsh vocals (2006–2009, 2021–present; live 2013–2014)
- Ludovico Cioffi – bass, backing vocals, harsh vocals (2022–present)

=== Former ===
- Anne Invernizzi – lead vocals (2002)
- Roy van Enkhuyzen – guitars (2002)
- Frank van der Meijden – guitars (2002)
- Martijn Willemsen – bass (2002)
- Tim Kuper – drums (2002)
- Ray van Lente – guitars (2006–2007)
- Rob van der Loo – bass (2006–2010; session and live 2022, 2025)
- Ewout Pieters – guitars, backing vocals (2009–2010)
- Ruben Israel – drums (2014–2017; live 2013)
- Merel Bechtold – rhythm guitar (2015–2019; live 2013–2015)
- Charlotte Wessels – lead vocals (2005–2021)
- Otto Schimmelpenninck van der Oije – bass, harsh vocals (2010–2021)
- Timo Somers – lead guitar, backing vocals (2011–2021)
- Joey de Boer – drums (2018–2021; live 2017–2018)
- Diana Leah – lead vocals (2022–2026)

=== Session and live ===
- Marko Hietala – bass (2006), co-lead vocals (2006, 2009, 2014–2018, 2023, 2026–present)
- Sharon den Adel – co-lead vocals (2006–2007, 2009, 2013)
- Rosan van der Aa – backing vocals (2006)
- George Oosthoek – harsh vocals (2006, 2009, 2012, 2014, 2016–2020)
- Ad Sluijter – guitars (2006)
- Jan "Örkki" Yrlund – guitars (2006)
- Guus Eikens – guitars, backing vocals (2006, 2009, 2012, 2014)
- Ariën van Weesenbeek – drums (2006)
- Roel Vink – bass (2009)
- Bas Maas – guitars (2012)
- Alissa White-Gluz – harsh vocals (2014, 2016)
- Jan Rechberger – drums (2019)
- Paolo Ribaldini – co-lead vocals (2022–present)
- Michele Guaitoli – co-lead vocals (2023)
- Fabienne Erni – co-lead vocals (2026–present)
- Noa Gruman – co-lead vocals (2026–present)

== Discography ==
=== Studio albums ===
Title	Album details	Peak chart positions							
Title	Album details	NLD	GER	SWI	UK	BEL (WA)	BEL (FL)	FRA	JPN
Lucidity	Released: 4 September 2006; Label: Roadrunner Records; Formats: CD, download	43	—	—	—	—	—	—	—
April Rain	Released: 20 March 2009; Label: Roadrunner Records; Formats: CD, LP, download	14	96	91	192	—	—	88	127
We Are the Others	Released: 1 June 2012; Label: Roadrunner; Formats: CD, LP, download	4	77	43	75	99	82	118	221
The Human Contradiction	Released: 4 April 2014; Label: Napalm; Formats: CD, LP, download	25	40	24	44	90	65	106	185
Moonbathers	Released: 26 August 2016; Label: Napalm; Formats: CD, LP, download	15	17	18	50	37	23	93	128
Apocalypse & Chill	Released: 7 February 2020; Label: Napalm; Formats: CD, LP, download	24	14	8	—	59	45	—	—
Dark Waters	Released: 10 February 2023; Label: Napalm; Formats: CD, LP, download	35	9	10	—	177	57	—	—
"—" denotes a recording that did not chart or was not released in that territory.

=== Live albums ===
Title	Live album details	Peak chart positions			
Title	Live album details	NLD	BEL (WA)	BEL (FL)	GER
A Decade of Delain: Live at Paradiso	Released: 27 October 2017; Label: Napalm Records; Formats: CD, DVD, Blu-ray	78	123	107	64

=== Compilations ===
Title	Compilation details	Peak chart positions			
Title	Compilation details	NLD	GER	BEL (WA)	BEL (FL)
Interlude	Released: 1 May 2013; Label: Napalm; Formats: CD, CD+DVD, download	37	91	124	141

=== EPs ===
Title	EP details	Peak chart positions				
Title	EP details	NLD	GER	SWI	BEL (WA)	BEL (FL)
Lunar Prelude	Released: 19 February 2016; Label: Napalm; Formats: CD, download	—	—	—	—	—
Hunter's Moon	Released: 22 February 2019; Label: Napalm; Formats: CD, CD+Blu-Ray, download	54	24	24	102	109
Dance with the Devil	Released: 8 November 2024; Label: Napalm; Formats: CD, LP, download	—	—	—	—	—
"—" denotes a recording that did not chart or was not released in that territory.

=== Singles ===
Year	Title	Peak chart positions	Album
Year	Title	NLD	Album
2007	"Frozen"	36	Lucidity
2007	"See Me in Shadow"	46	Lucidity
2007	"Shattered"	—	Lucidity
2008	"The Gathering"	—	Lucidity
2009	"Stay Forever"	—	April Rain
2009	"April Rain"	—	April Rain
2009	"Smalltown Boy"	—	Interlude
2010	"Nothing Left"	—	April Rain
2012	"Get the Devil Out of Me"	—	We Are the Others
2012	"We Are the Others"	—	We Are the Others
2013	"Are You Done with Me"	—	Interlude
2014	"Your Body Is a Battleground"	—	The Human Contradiction
2014	"Stardust"	—	The Human Contradiction
2015	"Sing to Me"	—	The Human Contradiction
2016	"Suckerpunch"	—	Lunar Prelude
2016	"The Glory and the Scum"	—	Moonbathers
2016	"Fire with Fire"	—	Moonbathers
2019	"Masters of Destiny"	—	Hunter's Moon
2019	"Burning Bridges"	—	Apocalypse & Chill
2019	"One Second"	—	Apocalypse & Chill
2020	"Ghost House Heart"	—	Apocalypse & Chill
2022	"The Quest and the Curse"	—	Dark Waters
2022	"Beneath"	—	Dark Waters
2023	"Moth to a Flame"	—	Dark Waters
2023	"Queen of Shadow"	—	Dark Waters
2024	"Dance with the Devil"	—	Dance with the Devil
2024	"Moth to a Flame" (live)	—	Dance with the Devil
2024	"The Reaping"	—	Dance with the Devil
2026	"We Are Fire"	—	TBA
"—" denotes a recording that did not chart or was not released in that territory.

=== Music videos ===
- "Frozen" (2007)
- "See Me in Shadow" (2007)
- "The Gathering" (2008)
- "Stay Forever" (2009)
- "April Rain" (2009)
- "Get the Devil Out of Me" (2012)
- "We Are the Others" (2012)
- "Are You Done with Me" (2013)
- "Stardust" (2014)
- "Suckerpunch" (2016)
- "Fire with Fire" (live video; 2016)
- "Masters of Destiny" (2019)
- "Burning Bridges" (2019)
- "Ghost House Heart" (2020)
- "The Quest and the Curse" (2022)
- "Beneath" (2022)
- "Moth to a Flame" (2023)
- "Queen of Shadow" (2023)
- "Dance with the Devil" (2024)
- "The Reaping" (2024)
- "We Are Fire" (2026)

== Awards and nominations ==
Year	Award	Category	Nominated work	Result	Notes
2007	MTV Europe Music Awards	New Sounds of Europe	Best New Band	Nominated	Knocked out on the eleventh day
2007	TMF Awards	Best Rock	Best New Band	Nominated	
