= Mellie Uyldert =

Dutch astrologer

- Born: Mellifica Uyldert; 31 May 1908; Blaricum, Netherlands
- Died: 10 May 2009 (aged 100); Bilthoven, Netherlands
- Occupations: Writer; astrologer; occultist; naturopath; alternative healer
- Known for: Esoteric and New Age writings
- Movement: New Age, Theosophy

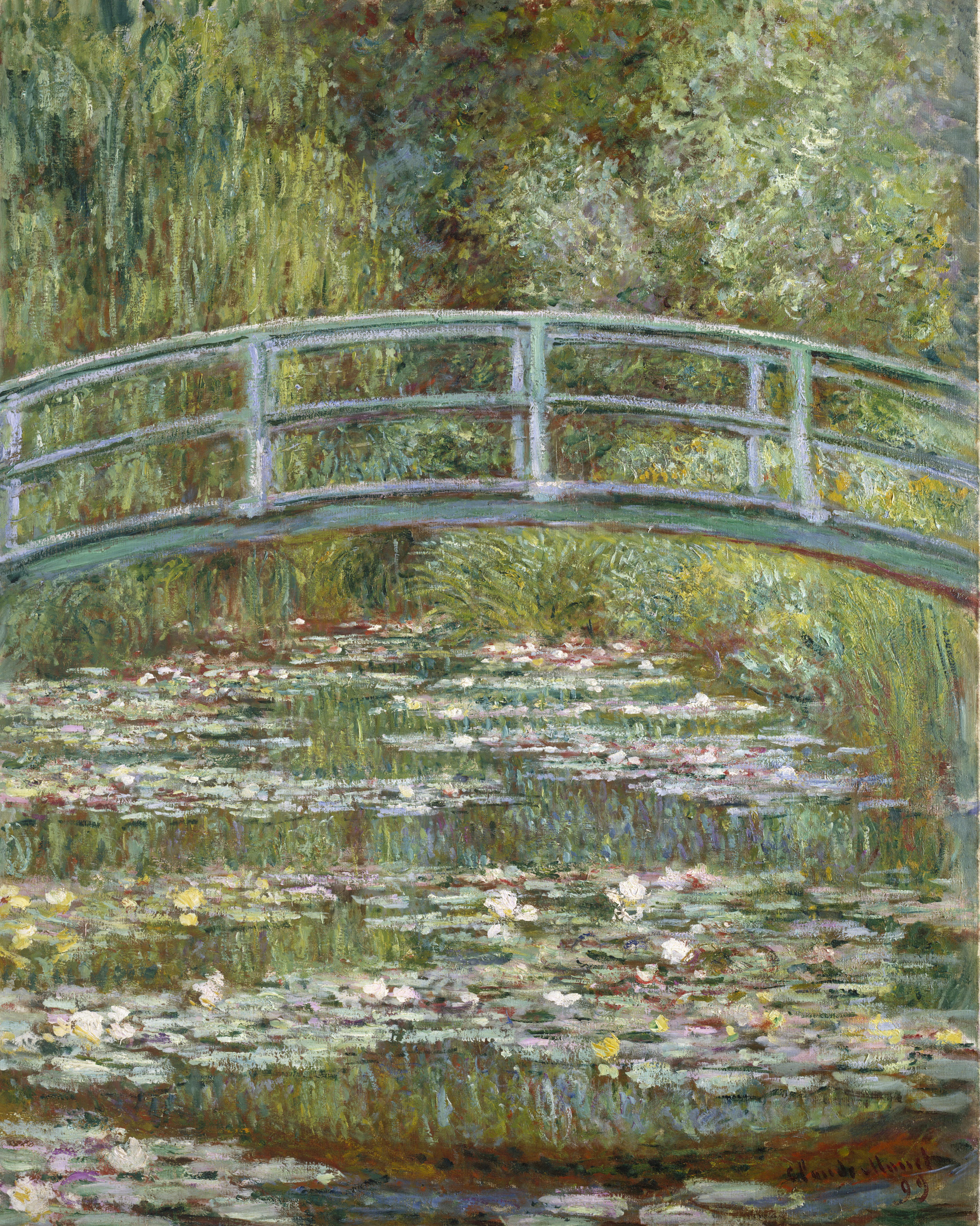
Along her books Mellie Uyldert frequently advocates relation among man and nature, gardens, mystical beings, natural life as the way for a better life. "Water lily pond " by Monet, 1899.

Mellifica "Mellie" Uyldert (31 May 1908 in Blaricum – 10 May 2009 in Bilthoven) was a Dutch New Age writer, alternative healer, occultist, and astrologer who published about 30 esoteric books, selling over a million copies, making her a recognized person in the Netherlands. Of a conservative, peculiar, poetic, eccentric character, she was also controversial because of several unsettling claims that caused antagonism. In the 1970s she became a celebrity on Dutch television. Her publications cover fairy tales, herbal medicine, stones, metals, health, and gnomes. She also wrote poems.

== Biography ==
=== Early life and education ===
Uyldert was the daughter of Marie Calisch, a teacher, and Emil Uyldert, both vegetarians who were followers of the back-to-nature Chaste Life movement. In 1912 her father Emil deserted the family, going to the United States and leaving Mellie's mother the task of raising their daughter.

At eighteen years old she became interested in astrology, taking her first lessons with a Freemason called Mr. Ram in Hilversum. In 1928 she joined the Dutch Philosophical Society (Nederlandse Vereniging voor Filosofie) but at age twenty-one she left it for lessons in esoteric philosophy including Theosophy and Indian-style astrology.

=== Career ===
In 1928 she began teaching astrology, and in 1934 she published her first book, the vegetarian cookbook Handleiding voor de moderne keuken (Manual for the Modern Kitchen). In 1942 she started giving courses on herbs and lectures.

From around 1947, she began writing in De Kaarsvlam (The Candle’s Flame), a bimonthly magazine produced in both English and German, and later published by the Mellie Uyldert Foundation. She was also a journalist for Onkruid, a widely read Dutch New Age magazine, and wrote for the magazine Overleven van de rechtse Ekologische Beweging (Surviving the right Ecological Movement).

Meanwhile, she was a teacher at naturopathic institutes such as the Academie voor Natuurgeneeswijzen (Academy of Natural Treatment) and De Kosmos in Amsterdam. However, in 1984 she was discredited by a booklet which accused her of alleged racist theories. Following these events, Onkruid magazine ended its relation with her.

=== Later life ===
Uyldert moved to Kalmthout in Belgium, where eleven years earlier she had established the Oasis Mellie Uyldert Foundation, a center for natural therapeutic treatments.

At a country house belonging to her foundation, Uyldert continued to write books, teach courses, organize workshops and give lectures up to age 96. She spent her final years in the Leendert Meeshuis, an anthroposophical nursing home in Bilthoven, where she lived until reaching the age of 100.

== Literary work ==
By 2008, Uyldert registered about 30 books with a total circulation around one million, with translations in German, English, Spanish, Italian, Portuguese, and Danish.

Uyldert reveals that the major interest over her work came when the World War began, turning people's attention to spiritual issues, but in fact it dates from the nineteen sixties, helped by her involvement with environmental writings, and because it was a period of a belief in a new, peaceful, romantic world accompanied by numerous protests against the emergent and global mechanized world and belief in a New Age.

Early on, she discovered esoteric astrology, claiming it as a base of all sciences and regularly citing the East as source of ancient wisdom. According to her, people have only a short free will, and most of time the celestial bodies rule their destinies.

Uyldert commonly focuses on some aspects of physical and spiritual diseases, regarding them as consequences of neglect of ancient knowledge and of the estrangement between man and nature. For instance she asserts that Chinese have had rules by 6000 years for which place a house should be built because the soil must provide good energy.

As for herself, she claims to remember things from her past lives and have psychic abilities since childhood, although she states "The important thing is the understanding coming from within - clairvoyance is just a trick". However she claims esoteric knowledge for her writings about herbal medicine and nutrition where she argues the influence of nature spirits over the plants.

Uyldert writes about healing, mystical, cultural, and magic properties of metals, stones, colors, and their influence over religions and traditions. She delivers her own interpretations of folkloric tales, human behavior, and many subjects, merging all with her astrologic knowledge. Sometimes producing very questionable assertions, she seems to balance the issue with many mystical verses and bucolic poems like those in her book "Het Levensritme" (The Rhythm of Life). Ultimately she affirmed that her life was dedicated to rescuing contact between the occult world and living people.

== Books ==
- 50 Horoscope Forms (50 Horoscoop formulieren)
- Heartily - a collection of articles of Onkruid magazine (Van harte - een bundeling van artikelen uit het tijdschrift Onkruid)
- Amnesty International Annual Report, 2003 (Amnesty international Jahresbericht)
- Astrology I: Cosmic Association (Astrologie I: Kosmische samenhangen)
- Astrology II: Aspects (Astrologie II: Aspecten)
- Astrology III: Medical Astrology (Astrologie III: Medische Astrologie)
- Earth's Living Body (Aarde's levend lichaam)
- Beings and Forces of Metal, 1977 (Wezen en krachten der metalen)
- Heal Yourself (Genees uzelf)
- Herbs in the Kitchen (Kruiden in de keuken)
- Hundreds of Medicinal Herbs (Honderd geneeskrachtige kruiden)
- Inspiration from life - Autobiography, 2002 (Leven uit inspiratie een autobiografie)
- Lexicon of Medicinal Herbs (Lexicon der Geneeskruiden)
- Love (Liefde)
- Manual for the Modern Kitchen, 1934 (Handleiding voor de moderne keuken)
- My Heart is on the Other side (Mijn hart is aan de Overzijde)
- Occult powers of Gemstones, 1972 (Verborgen Krachten der Edelstenen);
- Occult Wisdom of Ancient Rhymes (Verborgen Wijsheid van oude Rijmen)
- Occult Wisdom of children's games (Verborgen wijsheid van kinderspelen)
- Occult Wisdom of Fairy Tales (Verborgen Wijsheid van het Sprookje)
- Plant Wisdom: Allies, Friends and Helpers in Your Garden, 1980
- Plant’s Souls, 1974 (Plantenzielen)
- Stars, People, Herbs, 2005 (Sterren, mensen, kruiden )
- Symbolism in The Lord of the Rings, 1974 (Symboliek In de ban van de Ring)
- The Language of Herbs, 1980 (De Taal der Kruiden)
- The Psychology of Christianity (De psychologie van het Christendom)
- The Rhythm of Life, 1977 (Het Levensritme)
- The Solar Year, (Het zonnejaar)
- The Symbolism of the Winter Solstice (De Symboliek van de Midwintertijd)
