= Charlotte Wessels =

Dutch singer (born 1987)

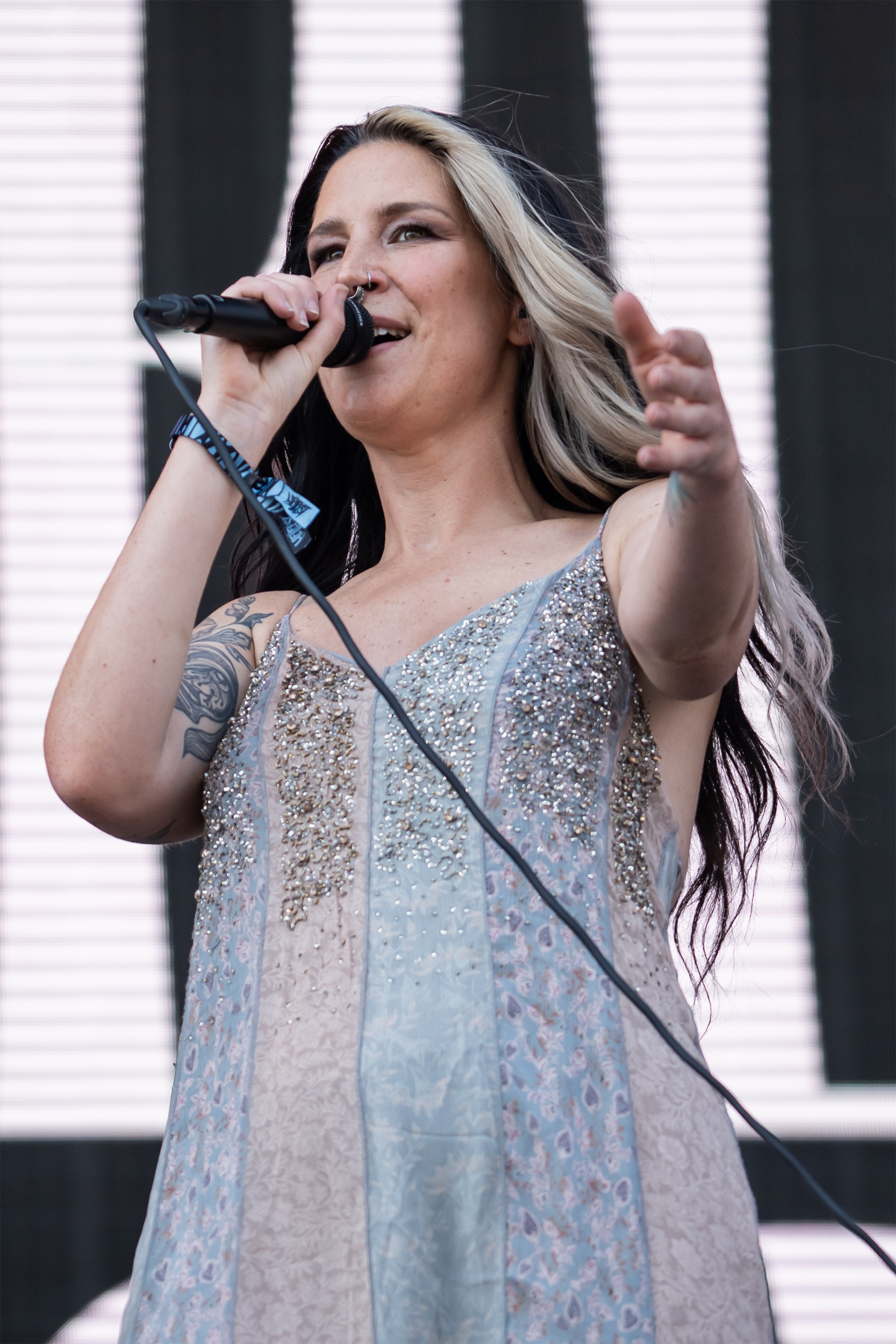
- Charlotte Wessels in 2025

Background information
- Born: Johanna Charlotte Wessels; 13 May 1987 (age 39)
- Origin: Zwolle, Netherlands
- Occupations: Singer, songwriter
- Years active: 2004–present
- Formerly of: Delain; Phantasma; To Elysium

Johanna Charlotte Wessels (born 13 May 1987) is a Dutch musician, best known as the former lead vocalist for the symphonic metal band Delain.

Wessels met Martijn Westerholt in 2004, and was invited to restart Delain in 2005 when it originally was a studio project, becoming the lead vocalist of the band until her departure from the band in 2021. Shortly after she left Delain, she started her solo career that same year with the release of her debut solo album, Tales from Six Feet Under, which was released in September. The following year, she released Tales from Six Feet Under, Vol. II, a follow-up to her debut in October. In 2024, Wessels released her third solo album, The Obsession, in September. Her fourth, Mute Swan Empire, is set for release in February 2027.

== Background ==
Wessels has been trained in both jazz singing and classical singing. She was first trained in jazz, but later, her instructor suggested classical singing to her. However, Wessels has stated that she found classical training to be very restrictive, and so she likes to do something "in between the classical and the jazz stuff, and if you look at classical music with high vocal lines, then you kind of get to gothic very soon!"

== Career ==
=== To Elysium (2000–2005) ===
She joined a gothic metal band named To Elysium around the age of fifteen or sixteen. She mentioned in an interview that her parents had to sign a contract because she was still underage.

=== Delain (2004–2021) ===
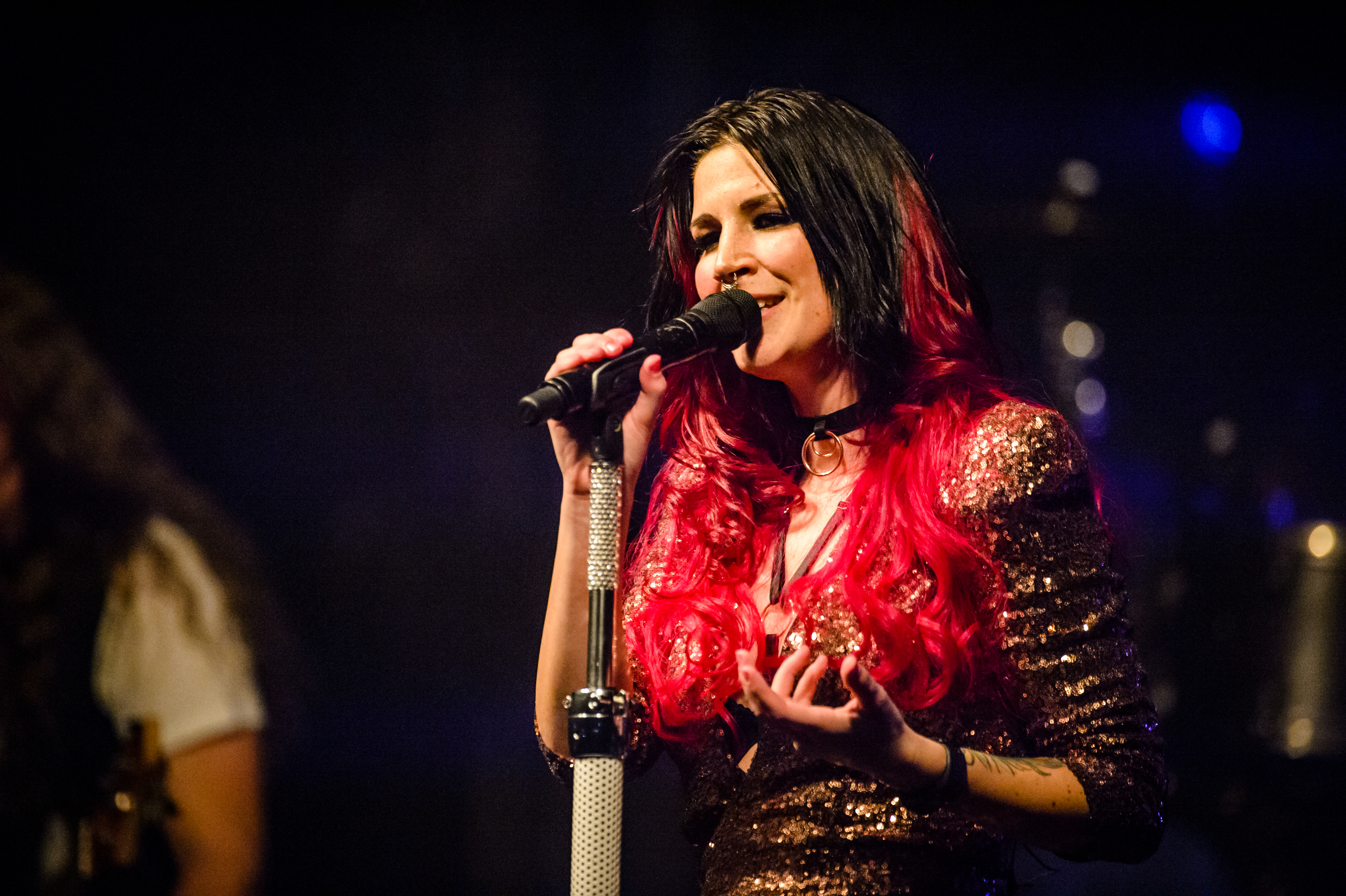
Wessels performing with Delain in 2016

Wessels became involved with Delain in 2004 when she met Martijn Westerholt formerly of Within Temptation. Since the band was meant to be a studio project only, Westerholt asked if she could write some lyrics and vocalize. She thought it was going to be a one-time thing. In 2005 they signed a deal with Roadrunner Records. She was the lead vocalist and primary lyricist of the band.

She departed Delain in February 2021, and simultaneously announced that she would be launching a solo career. In Wessels' statement on her departure, she wished the other departing members and the fans well:

"I hope that Delain remains a positive force in everyone's lives. We Are The Others, always will be, and none of this changes that."

In May 2021 during an interview, she reflected on her departure from Delain in February, stating that she was grateful that she got to work with the other musicians in the band.

=== Phantasma (2015–2017) ===
Wessels, along with Georg Neuhauser from Serenity and Oliver Philipps from Everon, formed a symphonic rock group named Phantasma. They were signed to Napalm Records and released a concept album titled The Deviant Hearts. Wessels not only sang on the album, but also wrote her debut novella called The Deviant Hearts especially for it. The novella is included with the album's physical release.

=== Solo career (2020–present) ===
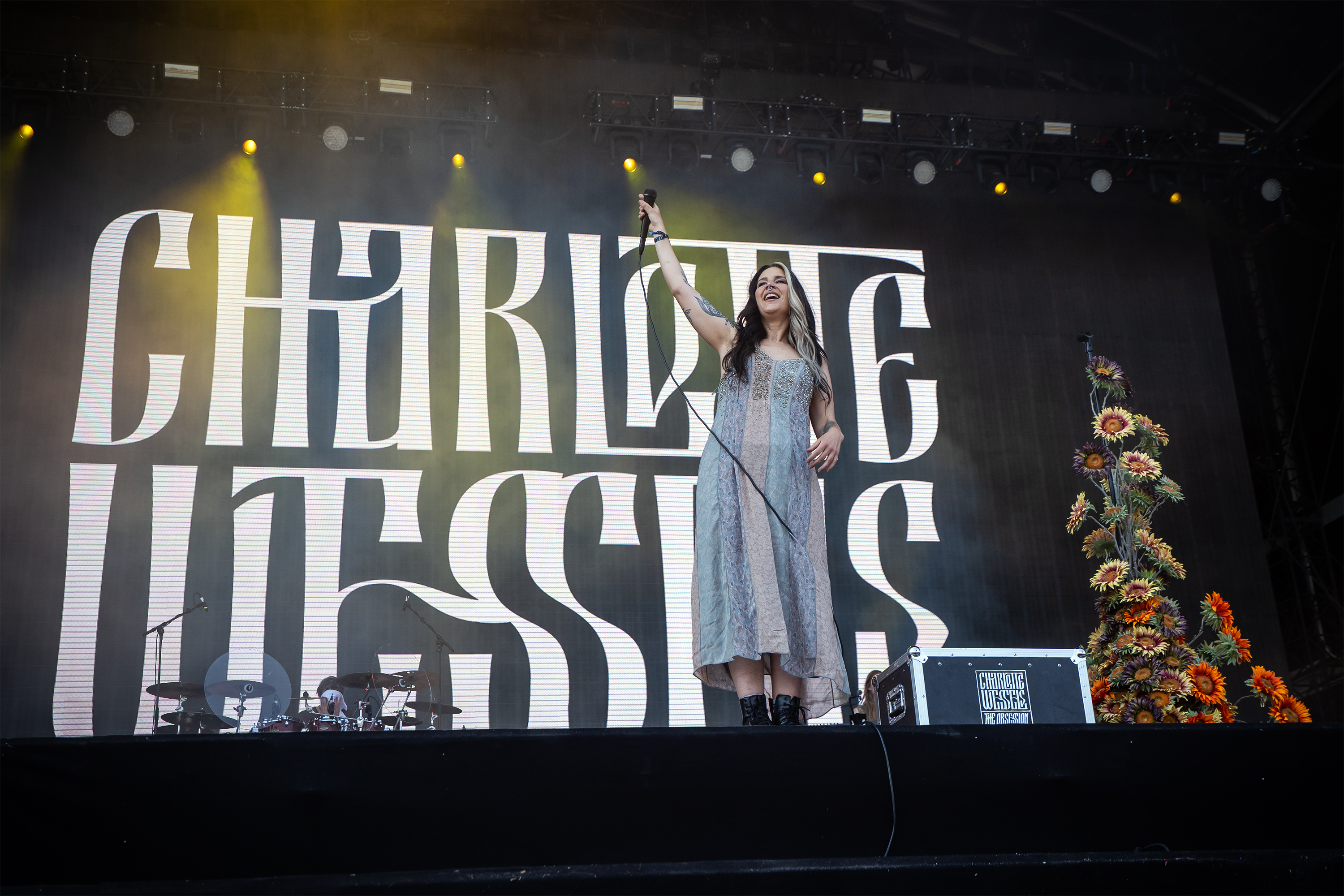
Wessels performing at Hellfest 2025

In August 2020, Wessels released the single, "Lizzie" which features Alissa White-Gluz as part of a collaboration.

Following her departure from Delain, Wessels had released a solo single, "Soft Revolution" via her Patreon which was Song of the Month in January 2021. On 14 May 2021, Wessels released a cover of Gerard McMahon's "Cry Little Sister", a song featured in the 1987 film The Lost Boys. On 30 June 2021, she released a music video of the single, "Superhuman".

On 1 June 2021, Wessels announced the title of her first studio album, Tales from Six Feet Under, a collection of multiple genres ranging from indie pop to synth-infused rock. It was released on 17 September 2021. All of the songs were made in her home studio, where she wrote, produced, and performed all the instruments on the record. Following the release of her solo album, she released her new song "Tonight" on 25 November 2021.

On 28 June 2022, Wessels announced her second studio album, titled Tales from Six Feet Under, Vol. II, which was released on 7 October 2022. Wessels also appeared on the EP The Alchemy Project by the Dutch symphonic metal band Epica, on the song "Sirens – Of Blood and Water", alongside Amalie Bruun. A music video for this song was released on 11 November 2022.

Wessels announced her third studio album, The Obsession, which was released on 20 September 2024, and at the same time, announced the album's first single, "The Exorcism", which was released on 16 May 2024. Wessels released four other singles to promote the album: "Chasing Sunsets", "Dopamine", "The Crying Room" and "Ode to the West Wind".

Her fourth studio album, Mute Swan Empire, is set to be released on 5 February 2027.

== Influences ==
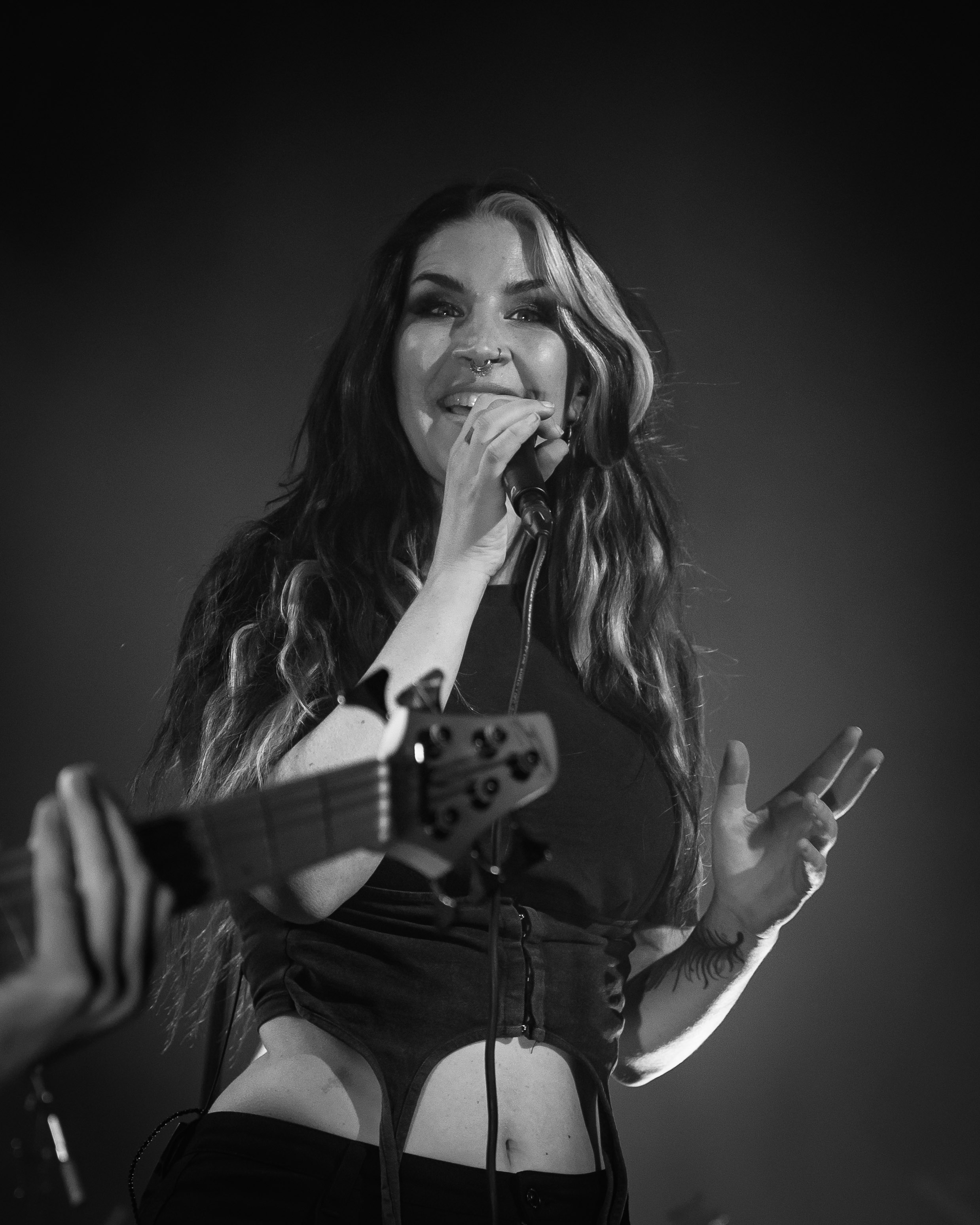
Wessels performing in 2024.

When asked in 2014 who her influences are, Wessels said

My parents had quite good taste in music so I had some of the classic rock influences; Pink Floyd, Deep Purple, Genesis, Led Zeppelin, and Kate Bush. My brother really got me into metal, those were really the high days of Metallica. Actually, Toxicity by System of a Down is still one of my favorite records ever. Right now, I am really into the alternative rock scene, Radiohead is my favorite band ever. I adore Muse and Nick Cave. Then there is the corner of the great female songwriters like Tori Amos, Björk. That pretty much covers it. I can go on for hours but I think these are the few directions which have influenced me most.

When asked in a Loudwire interview who she gets inspired by vocally she mentions Australian singer Sia, she admires Sia's voice and also her songwriting.

Wessels stated on her Instagram in 2018 that Dolores O'Riordan's voice was one of her main inspirations to start singing.

== Personal life ==
She is a cousin of Dutch hardcore DJ DaY-már. Wessels has an art history degree and also has a master's degree in gender studies. She is a vegan. She considers herself a feminist and she doesn't like the female-fronted metal term: "It's just really weird that the gender of one person in the band defines what kind of music you make! I think that it's one of the things that really indicates that the bias is still there."

On 26 August 2017, Charlotte revealed that she had married her partner after being together for twelve years.

== Discography ==
Studio albums:

- Tales from Six Feet Under (2021)
- Tales from Six Feet Under, Vol. II (2022)
- The Obsession (2024)
- Mute Swan Empire (2027)

=== Delain ===
Studio albums:

- Lucidity (2006)
- April Rain (2009)
- We Are the Others (2012)
- The Human Contradiction (2014)
- Moonbathers (2016)
- Apocalypse & Chill (2020)

EPs & Live albums:

- Lunar Prelude (2016)
- A Decade of Delain: Live at Paradiso (2017)
- Hunter's Moon (2019)

=== Phantasma ===
Studio albums:

- The Deviant Hearts (2015)

== Filmography ==
- Soaring Highs and Brutal Lows: The Voices of Women in Metal (2015)
