= Merel Bechtold =

Dutch musician

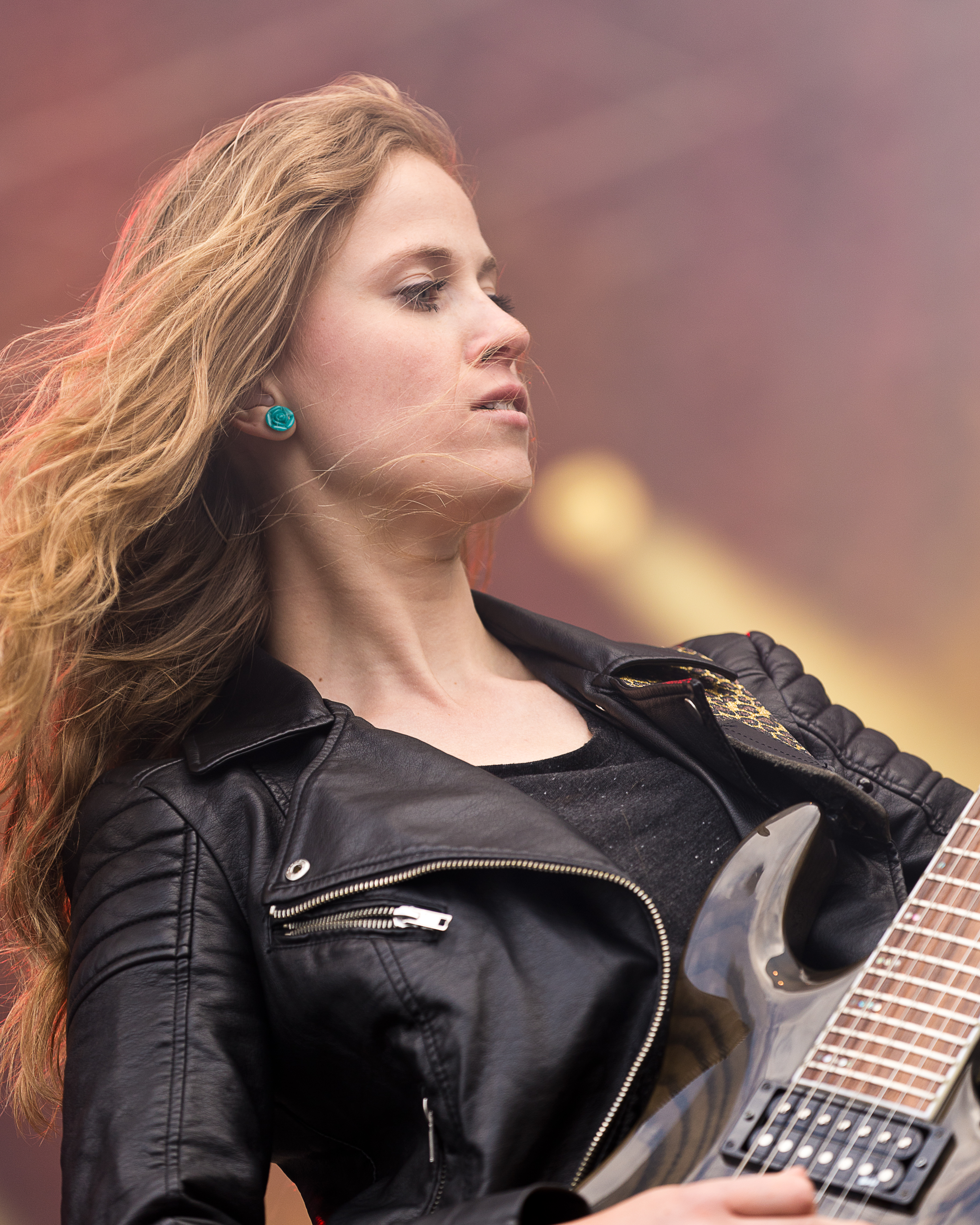
- Merel Bechtold performing with The Gentle Storm in 2015

Background information
- Born: February 27, 1992 (age 34)
- Origin: Blaricum, Netherlands
- Genres: Death metal, power metal, symphonic metal, hard rock
- Occupations: Musician, Composer
- Instrument: Guitar
- Years active: 2007–present
- Member of: Dear Mother
- Formerly of: Purest of Pain, Delain, MaYaN
- Website: merelbechtold.com

Merel Bechtold (born February 27, 1992) is a Dutch musician. She was born in Blaricum. She started playing guitar in 2007 at the age of fifteen. Half a year later she founded the band Purest of Pain, in which she played lead guitar until its disbandment in 2018. In 2013, she released the single "Momentum" and in 2014 she starred at the large metal festival Wacken Open Air.

== Musical acts ==
At the end of 2012, Bechtold performed her first performance with Delain. In 2013, for the first time, she filled in for Timo Somers, Delain's main guitarist. During the same period, she performed several concerts with Purest of Pain. In October 2014, she was contacted by Isaac Delahaye (Epica, ex-MaYaN) who had to leave MaYaN for other priorities. After two concerts in January 2015 as a replacement, the band asked her to become a permanent member. She left MaYaN in 2023.

In the summer of 2014, she became part of Anneke van Giersbergen's The Gentle Storm, with van Giersbergen's husband Rob Snijders. She then played several concerts with Delain alongside Somers. In 2015, she again accompanied Delain at other concerts with Sabaton. From October 2015 until June 2019, Bechtold was officially a permanent member of Delain. In 2019 Bechtold formed the alternative/metalcore band Dear Mother, with David Pear and former Delain member Joey de Boer.
