= Martijn Westerholt =

Dutch keyboardist

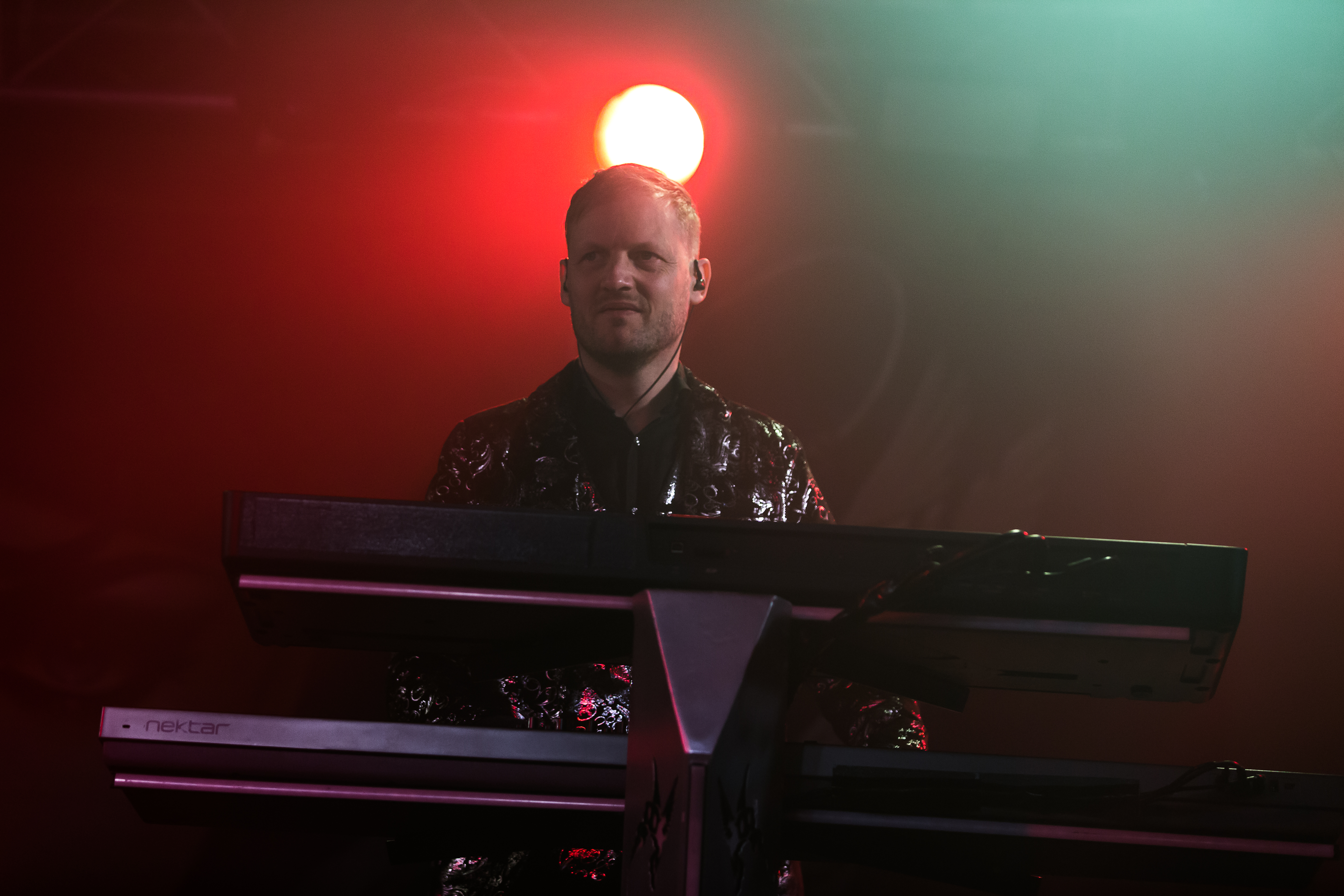
- Westerholt with Delain in 2024

Background information
- Born: David Martijn Westerholt; 30 March 1979 (age 47)
- Origin: Zwolle, Overijssel, Netherlands
- Occupations: Musician; songwriter
- Instrument: Keyboards
- Years active: 1996–2002; 2005–present
- Member of: Delain; Eye of Melian
- Formerly of: Within Temptation
- Spouse: Robin La Joy
- Website: delain.nl; eyeofmelian.com

David Martijn Westerholt (born 30 March 1979) is a Dutch musician and the founder, keyboardist and main songwriter of the symphonic metal band Delain. He was previously a member of symphonic metal band Within Temptation, until he was diagnosed with infectious mononucleosis shortly after the release of Within Temptation's second studio album, Mother Earth. His brother Robert is the guitarist and founder of Within Temptation. He has lived in Zwolle, since studying Communication at Windesheim College in 1998.

In September 2021, Westerholt formed a new symphonic project called Eye of Melian, with his wife, Robin La Joy, Johanna Kurkela, and Mikko P. Mustonen.

== Discography ==
=== With Eye of Melian ===
==== Studio albums ====
- Legends of Light – 2022
- Forest of Forgetting – 2026

=== With Within Temptation ===
==== Studio albums ====
- Enter – 1997
- Mother Earth – 2000

==== EP ====
- The Dance – 1998

| New title | Keyboardist for Within Temptation; 1996–2001 | Succeeded by Martijn Spierenburg |
| New title | Keyboardist for Delain since 2002 | Incumbent |
