= Elegy (disambiguation) =

An elegy is a poem of mourning.

Elegy, Elegie, or Elegies may also refer to:

== Art ==
- Élégie, a painting by William-Adolphe Bouguereau

== Literature ==
- Any poem written in elegiac couplets
- Elegies by Propertius (ca. 50-15 BC)
- Elegy, a 1586 poem by Chidiock Tichborne
- "Elegy Written in a Country Churchyard", a 1751 poem by Thomas Gray
- Elegy, the opening poem in Leonard Cohen’s first collection Let Us Compare Mythologies from 1956.

== Film and television ==
- Elégia, a 1965 film by Hungarian director Zoltán Huszárik
- Elegy (film), a 2008 film by Spanish director Isabel Coixet
- Elegies (film), a 2023 documentary by Hong Kong director Ann Hui
- "Elegy" (The Twilight Zone), an episode of The Twilight Zone
- "Elegy" (The X-Files), an episode of The X-Files

== Music ==
=== Classical ===
- "Elegy", Russian song by Modest Mussorgsky
- Elegy, by Elliott Carter
- Elegy (Corigliano), by John Corigliano
- Elegy, by Hubert Parry
- Elegy, for guitar by Alan Rawsthorne
- Elegia (Madetoja), Op. 4/1, a 1909 composition for string orchestra by Leevi Madetoja
- Elegie (Schoeck), Op.36 song cycle for baritone and chamber orchestra by Othmar Schoeck
- Élégie (ballet), a ballet by George Balanchine to Igor Stravinsky's Élégie for solo viola
- Élégie (Massenet), an 1873 piece for cello and orchestra
- Élégie (Fauré), an 1883 piece for cello and orchestra
- Elegies (Busoni), a 1908 series of pieces
- Elegy, Op.58, an orchestral work for strings by Edward Elgar
- Élégie (Stravinsky), a 1944 piece for solo viola
- Elegies (William Finn), a 2003 song cycle
- Élégie, by Johann Kaspar Mertz
- Élégie pour cor et piano, FP 168, by Francis Poulenc
- Élégie pour 2 pianos (en accords alternés), FP 175, by Francis Poulenc
- Elegy, by George Thalben-Ball, 1960

=== Popular bands ===
- Elegy (band), a Dutch power metal musical group
- Elegies (J-pop), a J-pop musical group

=== Albums ===
- Elegy (The Nice album), a 1971 album
- Elegy (John Zorn album), a 1991 album
- Elegy (Amorphis album), a 1996 album
- Elegy (Julian Lloyd Webber album), a 1998 album
- Elegy (Shadow of Intent album), a 2022 album
- Elegy (EP), a 2005 EP by Leaves' Eyes
- Elegies (video), a 2005 DVD by Machine Head

=== Songs ===
- "Elegy", a suite by Chicago from their 1971 album Chicago III
- "Elegy", a song by Patti Smith from her 1975 album Horses
- "Elegy", a song by Jethro Tull from the 1979 album Stormwatch
- "Elegy", a song by Conception from their 1991 album The Last Sunset
- "Elegy", a song by Edge of Sanity from their 1994 album Purgatory Afterglow
- "Elegy", a song by Labyrinth from their 2000 album Sons of Thunder
- "Elegy", a song by As I Lay Dying from their 2003 album Frail Words Collapse
- "Elegy", a song by Becoming the Archetype from their 2005 album Terminate Damnation
- "Elegy", a song by Leaves' Eyes from their 2005 album Vinland Saga
- "Elegy", a song by Intronaut from the 2010 album Valley of Smoke
- "Elegy", a song by Fleshgod Apocalypse from the 2013 album Labyrinth
- "Elegy", a song by Seventh Wonder from the 2022 album The Testament
- "Elegy", a song by Architects from the 2025 album The Sky, the Earth & All Between
- "Elegies", a song by Make Them Suffer from the 2012 album Neverbloom
- "Élégie", an arrangement of Massenet's Élégie by Art Tatum
