= Sign of the Dragonhead =

Studio album by Leaves' Eyes
- Released: January 12, 2018
- Genre: Symphonic metal
- Length: 47:07
- Label: AFM Records; Chaos Reigns (Japan); Ward Records (Japan); Fono Ltd. (Russia)
- Producer: Alexander Krull

Leaves' Eyes chronology
King of Kings (2015)	Sign of the Dragonhead (2018)	The Last Viking (2020)

Singles from Sign of the Dragonhead
- 1. "Across the Sea" Released: 2017; 2. "Jomsborg" Released: 2018; 3. "Sign of the Dragonhead" Released: 2018

Sign of the Dragonhead is the seventh studio album of the German symphonic metal band Leaves' Eyes. It is their first full-length release with Elina Siirala as lead vocalist, following Liv Kristine's departure in 2016.

== Track listing ==
No.	Title	Length
1.	"Sign of the Dragonhead"	4:06
2.	"Across the Sea"	3:49
3.	"Like a Mountain"	4:44
4.	"Jomsborg"	3:25
5.	"Völva"	3:38
6.	"Riders on the Wind"	3:53
7.	"Fairer Than the Sun"	4:20
8.	"Shadows in the Night"	3:48
9.	"Rulers of Wind and Waves"	3:00
10.	"Fires in the North"	4:21
11.	"Waves of Euphoria"	8:03
Total length:		47:07

Bonus tracks
No.	Title	Length
12.	"Beowulf"	4:07
13.	"Winter Nights"	3:40
14.	"Fairer than the Sun" (Acoustic, Japanese edition)	3:40
Total length:		54:54

=== Notes ===
- The limited, digipak and box set editions of the album contain a second instrumental disc with all the tracks from the regular edition.

== Personnel ==
Leaves' Eyes

- Joris Nijenhuis – drums, choir vocals, assistant recording
- Pete Streit – guitars
- Elina Siirala – female vocals, choir vocals
- Thorsten Bauer – guitars, bass, mandolin, choir vocals, songwriting, assistant recording, orchestral arrangements
- Alexander Krull – growling vocals, choir vocals, samples, programming, songwriting, lyrics, recording, engineering, mixing, mastering, production, cover art concept

Additional musicians

- London Voices – choir vocals
- Christian Roch – uilleann pipes, flute, whistles
- Christoph Kutzer – cello
- Thomas Roth – nyckelharpa
- Full Moon Choir – additional choir vocals
- Uwe Fichtner – choir vocals
- Andreas Bösch – choir vocals
- Christel Fichtner – additional choir vocals
- Sophie Zaaijer – solo violin
- Fieke van den Hurk – hurdy gurdy
- Knuth Jerxsen – percussion, effected drums

Production

- Stefan Heilemann – cover art concept, artwork, band photography
- Victor Smolski – recording
- Mat Bartram – recording
- Chris Parker – assistant recording

== Charts ==
Chart (2018)	Peak position
Austrian Albums (Ö3 Austria)	69
Belgian Albums (Ultratop Flanders)	189
German Albums (Offizielle Top 100)	21
Swiss Albums (Schweizer Hitparade)	33
UK Independent Albums (OCC)	18
UK Rock & Metal Albums (OCC)	10
