= Retribution (Obscura album) =

Studio album by Obscura
- Released: August 2006
- Recorded: August 2004 at Mastersound Studios; November 2006 (Bonus Tracks)
- Genre: Technical death metal
- Length: 45:50
- Label: Vots Records, Relapse (remastered)
- Producer: Obscura and Alexander Krull; V. Santura (remastered)

Obscura chronology
Retribution (2006)	Cosmogenesis (2009)

Alternative cover
- 2010 remastered edition cover

Professional ratings
Review scores
Source	Rating
AllMusic	3.5/5 stars

Retribution is the debut studio album by German technical death metal band Obscura. It was recorded in August 2004 and released 2 years later in August 2006 on Vots Records. After the band signed to Relapse Records and released Cosmogenesis, they decided to reissue Retribution. The reissue, which was remastered, was released in 2010 and featured bonus tracks plus new artwork.

== Track listing ==
Standard Edition
No.	Title	Lyrics	Music	Length
1.	"Humankind"	Steffen Kummerer; Morean; V. Santura	Jonas Baumgartl	2:48
2.	"Nothing"	Kummerer; Morean; V. Santura	Kummerer	4:56
3.	"Unhinged"	Kummerer; Morean; V. Santura	Kummerer	2:16
4.	"None Shall Be Spared"	Kummerer; Morean; V. Santura	Baumgartl	5:58
5.	"Alone"	V. Santura	Kummerer	3:44
6.	"Hymn to a Nocturnal Visitor"	Kummerer; Morean; V. Santura	Stephan Bergbauer	6:33
7.	"Intoxicated"	V. Santura	Kummerer	2:29
8.	"Exit Life"	V. Santura	Kummerer	3:48
9.	"Sentiment"	Kummerer	Kummerer; Baumgartl	6:11
10.	"Sweet Silence" (instrumental, ends at 1:15 followed by two minutes of silence)		Kummerer	3:15
11.	"Lack of Comprehension" (Death cover)	Chuck Schuldiner	Schuldiner	3:48
Total length:				45:50

2010 Reissue bonus tracks
No.	Title	Lyrics	Music	Length
12.	"Synthetically Revived" (Suffocation cover)	Doug Cerrito; Terrance Hobbs	Cerrito; Hobbs	4:04
13.	"God of Emptiness" (Morbid Angel cover)	David Vincent	Trey Azagthoth	6:01
Total length:				55:55

2010 Japanese Reissue bonus tracks
No.	Title	Lyrics	Music	Length
14.	"Decade ov Therion" (Behemoth cover)	Krzysztof Azarewicz	Nergal	3:37
15.	"Wings" (Vader cover)	Paweł Frelik	Piotr Wiwczarek	3:09
Total length:				62:41

== Personnel ==
Obscura

- Steffen Kummerer – lead vocals, rhythm guitar, lead guitar
- Markus Lempsch – lead guitar, backing vocals
- Jonas Fischer – bass
- Jonas Baumgartl – drums, cello (track 6)

Additional personnel

- Victor "V. Santura" Bullok – additional vocals, guitar solo (track 8)
- Stephan Bergbauer – guitar solos (track 2, 9)
- Matthias Röderer – guitar solo (track 7)
- Thorsten Bauer – guitar solo (track 11)
- Martin Bauer – bass solo (exact track uncredited)
- Orion Landau – design on reissue

Production

- Alexander Krull – production
- Obscura – producer
- Victor "V. Santura" Bullok – mastering on the reissue
