= Enter My Religion =

Studio album by Liv Kristine
- Released: 13 February 2006
- Recorded: 2005–2006
- Genres: Gothic rock, Pop rock
- Length: 45:07
- Label: Roadrunner
- Producer: Alexander Krull

Liv Kristine chronology
Deus Ex Machina (1999)	Enter My Religion (2006)	Skintight (2010)

Enter My Religion is the second album by Leaves' Eyes vocalist and lyricist Liv Kristine. It was released in 2006 on Roadrunner Records.

== Background ==
In an interview Liv Kristine gave with Brave Words And Bloody Knuckles in 2006, she was quoted as saying "When it comes to music, doing one thing is not enough. I've got a lot of different sources of musical inspiration, and I know that doing one thing is easy and saves time, but I wouldn't know what I would do with all my ideas and dreams if I went that direction. I have to bring them to life somehow, so doing a solo project is a way of being creative. With me, the creative process is an ongoing thing, so it really comes down to the planning. My husband (Atrocity frontman/producer Alex Krull) and I have the same profession, I have a fantastic mother-in-law, and I'm also able to close the door when I leave the studio or tour bus. Time off is time off and work is work, and I enjoy both."

== Reviews ==
Professional ratings
Review scores
Source	Rating
Lords Of Metal	8/10 stars
sputnikmusic	2.0/5 stars

The album received mixed reviews. In an early 2007 issue of Terrorizer Magazine, it got 2 of 10, and the reviewer called it "Euro-pop bilge". But Brave Words & Bloody Knuckles thought differently, calling it "a melancholic pop-rock album geared towards a non-metal audience. While it does have commercial potential – particularly on the European market – it is also a surprisingly strong multi-faceted piece of work well distanced from the Britney Spears/P!nk/Jessica Simpson formula."

== Track listing ==
No.	Title	Lyrics	Music	Length
1.	"Over the Moon"	Liv Kristine	Peter Tagtgren	3:32
2.	"Fake a Smile"	Kristine	Alexander Krull, Timon Birkhofer	3:40
3.	"All the Time in the World"	Kristine	Thorsten Bauer	3:52
4.	"My Revelation"	Kristine	Bauer	3:31
5.	"Coming Home"	Kristine	Bauer, Krull	4:11
6.	"Trapped in Your Labyrinth"	Kristine	Tagtgren	3:46
7.	"Blue Emptiness"	Kristine	Birkhofer, Bauer	3:49
8.	"You Are the Night"	Kristine	Mathias Röderer	3:34
9.	"Enter My Religion"	Kristine	Bauer	3:50
10.	"Streets of Philadelphia"	Bruce Springsteen	Springsteen	3:19
11.	"You Take Me Higher"	Kristine	Kristine, Röderer	3:37
12.	"For a Moment"	Kristine	Krull, Bauer	4:24

== Personnel ==
- Liv Kristine - lead and backing vocals
- Thorsten Bauer - electric, acoustic and flamenco guitars, saz, mandolin, sitar, oud, piano and recording
- Alexander Krull - keyboards, programming, samples, recording, producing, mixing and mastering
- Timon Birkhofer - bass, cello, piano and backing vocals
- Jana Kallenberg - violin
- Dimitrios Argyropolous - bouzouki and tzoura
- Jean Paul - accordion
- Katharina Klein - flute
- Florian Tekale - keyboards and additional piano
- Moritz Neuner - drums and percussion
- Mathias Röderer - recording

== Sources ==
- Liv Kristine "Enter My Religion" CD Liner Notes; Roadrunner Records, 2006
