= Deus Ex Machina (Liv Kristine album) =

Studio album by Liv Kristine
- Released: 1998
- Genre: Gothic rock, synthpop
- Length: 41:51
- Label: Massacre, Candlelight
- Producer: Gunther Illi

Liv Kristine chronology
Deus Ex Machina (1998)	Enter My Religion (2006)

Professional ratings
Review scores
Source	Rating
allmusic	3.5/5 stars

Deus Ex Machina is the first full-length album from former Leaves' Eyes frontwoman Liv Kristine. Unlike her follow-up, "Enter My Religion", she only co-wrote two songs: the title track and "In the Heart of Juliet". The song "3 am" is a duet between Liv Kristine and Nick Holmes of Paradise Lost.

It was re-issued in 2007 on Candlelight Records, with the catalog number 338.

== Track listing ==
All music is composed by Gunther Illi.

No.	Title	Lyrics	Length
1.	"Requiem"	(instrumental)	0:54
2.	"Deus Ex Machina"	Kristine	9:34
3.	"In the Heart of Juliet"	Kristine	4:52
4.	"3 AM"	Brendel	5:02
5.	"Waves of Green"	Hertler	5:55
6.	"Take Good Care"	Brendel	3:59
7.	"Huldra"	Illi	2:58
8.	"Portrait: Ei tulle med øyne blå"	Illi	3:59
9.	"Good Vibes Bad Vibes"	Brendel	3:38
10.	"Outro"	(instrumental)	0:59
11.	"3 AM" (No Loop mix) (bonus track)	Brendel	4:56

== Personnel ==
Musicians

- Liv Kristine – vocals
- Gunther Illi – guitars, keyboards, synthesizers, piano, bass, drums, percussion, programming
- Nick Holmes – vocals (track 4)
- Stefan Muller-Ruppert – vocals (track 2)

Production

- Gunther Illi – production, engineering, mixing
- Andy Horn, Gunter Eckert – engineering
- Dierk Budde – mixing
- Alexander Krull – mastering
