= Skintight =

Studio album by Liv Kristine
- Released: 2010
- Recorded: 2009–2010
- Genre: Rock, pop rock
- Length: 35:11
- Label: Napalm
- Producer: Alexander Krull

Liv Kristine chronology
Enter My Religion (2006)	Skintight (2010)	Libertine (2012)

Professional ratings
Review scores
Source	Rating
Allmusic	Review

Skintight is the third album by Leaves' Eyes female vocalist and lyricist Liv Kristine. It was released in August 2010 on Napalm Records.

== Track listing ==
All lyrics are written by Liv Kristine; all music is composed by Thorsten Bauer, Alexander Krull.

No.	Title	Length
1.	"Skintight"	3:18
2.	"Twofold"	3:07
3.	"Train to Somewhere"	3:33
4.	"Love in Grey"	4:10
5.	"Emotional Catastrophe"	2:43
6.	"Life Line"	3:04
7.	"Boy at the Window"	3:45
8.	"Wonders"	3:11
9.	"Versified Harmonies"	4:12
10.	"The Rarest Flower"	4:05

Limited edition has one bonus track.

No.	Title	Length
11.	"One of Them"	3:24

== Production ==
- Produced, recorded, engineered, mixed and mastered by Alexander Krull
- Assistant recording engineers: Thorsten Bauer & Matthias Röderer
- Additional Programming & Samples by Alexander Krull
- Recorded at Mastersound Studio, Steinheim, Germany

== Personnel ==
- Liv Kristine: Vocals
- Thorsten Bauer: Electric and acoustic guitars, bass, keyboards, mandolin
- Seven Antonopoulos: Drums and percussion
- Oliver Palotei: Piano on "The Rarest Flower"
- Christoph Kutzer: Cello on "The Rarest Flower"
