= Vervain (disambiguation) =

Vervain (from French) is the common name of plants of the genus Verbena.

It can also refer to:

- The Vervain hummingbird from the West Indies
- The 25th day of Prairial in the French Republican Calendar, corresponding to June 15 in the Gregorian calendar
- HMS Vervain (K190), a Royal Navy Group 2 Flower class corvette
- Vervain, one of the Efrafan rabbits from the novel Watership Down
- Oncle Vervain, a character in the 2000 Anne Rice novel Merrick
- Liv Kristine's fifth solo album, Vervain
- A track on the Daniel Dumile album Special Herbs, Vols. 9 & 0
- A track on the Faith and the Muse debut album Elyria
- In The Vampire Diaries: An herb that has the power to weaken vampires and protects humans from their mind control.
- A song from Rock band, The Dose
