= See Me in Shadow =

2007 single by Delain

Single by Delain

from the album Lucidity
- Released: 2 July 2007
- Genre: Symphonic metal
- Length: 3:36 (single edit); 4:41 (album version)
- Label: Roadrunner
- Songwriter(s): Martijn Westerholt, Charlotte Wessels
- Producer(s): Oliver Phillips, Martijn Westerholt

Delain singles chronology
"Frozen" (2007)	"See Me in Shadow" (2007)	"Shattered" (2007)

"See Me in Shadow" is the second single by the Dutch symphonic metal band Delain from the album Lucidity. It was released on 2 July 2007 by Roadrunner Records.

== Track listing ==
1. "See Me in Shadow" (Single Edit) - 3.36
2. "Frozen" (Acoustic Version) - 4.27
3. "Silhouette of a Dancer" (Acoustic Version) - 3.21
4. "See Me in Shadow" (Acoustic Version) - 3.36
5. "See Me in Shadow" (Video) - 3.36

== Personnel ==
- Charlotte Wessels – vocals
- Ronald Landa – guitars
- Ray van Lente – guitars
- Rob van der Loo – Bass
- Martijn Westerholt – keyboards
- Sander Zoer – drums
- Liv Kristine - vocals (album version only)
- Rupert Gillet - cello

== Charts ==
Chart	Peak position
Dutch Top 40	46
