= Lucidity (album) =

2006 studio album by Delain

Studio album by Delain
- Released: 4 September 2006
- Recorded: Spacelab Studio, Grefrath, Germany; Sonic Pump Studios, Helsinki, Finland (Marko's bass and vocals); Mastersound Studio, Steinheim, Germany (Liv's vocals) somewhere in the Netherlands (Sharon's vocals)
- Genre: Symphonic metal
- Length: 54:44
- Label: Roadrunner
- Producers: Oliver Philipps, Martijn Westerholt

Delain studio album chronology
Lucidity (2006)	April Rain (2009)

Singles from Lucidity
- 1. "Frozen" Released: 8 January 2007; 2. "See Me in Shadow" Released: 2 July 2007; 3. "Shattered" Released: 2007; 4. "The Gathering" Released: 13 December 2008

Professional ratings
Review scores
Source	Rating
AllMusic	3/5 stars
About.com	3.5/5 stars
Metal Storm	8.5/10 stars
Sonic Cathedral	6/10 stars

Lucidity is the debut studio album by the Dutch symphonic metal band Delain. It was released on 4 September 2006 by Roadrunner Records. It was released in the US by Sensory Records on 22 June 2010. After the disbandment of the band which had recorded the Amenity demo, the keyboard player and main composer Martijn Westerholt decided to retain lead vocalist Charlotte Wessels and to record an album with the best session musicians available, without the perspective of bringing the songs on tour. He recruited for the project Marko Hietala on vocals and bass, Ad Sluijter, Guus Eikens and Jan Yrlund on guitars and Ariën van Weesenbeek on drums. Guest vocalists on the album were Sharon den Adel, Liv Kristine, and George Oosthoek.

The album was recorded in different periods during 2005 and 2006 to accommodate the availability of the many musicians involved, often on tour with their bands.

Lucidity peaked at No. 43 in Dutch charts and the success of the album pushed Westerholt to reorganize Delain as a touring band with new musicians.

In 2021, it was elected by Metal Hammer as the 20th best symphonic metal album.

== Track listing ==
No.	Title	Lyrics	Music	Length
1.	"Sever"	Martijn Westerholt	Westerholt	4:53
2.	"Frozen"	Charlotte Wessels, Westerholt	Westerholt	4:43
3.	"Silhouette of a Dancer"	Wessels, Westerholt	Westerholt, Jan Yrlund	5:25
4.	"No Compliance"	Westerholt	Westerholt	5:10
5.	"See Me in Shadow"	Wessels, Westerholt	Westerholt	4:41
6.	"Shattered"	Westerholt	Westerholt	4:20
7.	"The Gathering"	Guus Eikens	Eikens	3:35
8.	"Daylight Lucidity"	Westerholt, Eikens	Westerholt, Eikens	4:36
9.	"Sleepwalkers Dream"	Wessels, Westerholt	Westerholt	4:27
10.	"A Day for Ghosts"	Westerholt	Westerholt	3:37
11.	"Pristine"	Rein Doze	Westerholt	4:31
12.	"(Deep) Frozen" (Bonus track)	Wessels	Westerholt	4:46

Japanese edition bonus track
No.	Title	Length
13.	"Silhouette of a Dancer" (Acoustic)	3:23

US edition bonus tracks
No.	Title	Length
13.	"Frozen" (Acoustic)	4:27
14.	"Silhouette of a Dancer" (Acoustic)	3:21
15.	"See Me in Shadow" (Acoustic)	3:36
16.	"No Compliance" (Charlotte only vocals)	5:09

The 10th Anniversary Edition (CD 1) - Bonus Tracks
No.	Title	Length
13.	"Silhouette of a Dancer" (Live)	5:50
14.	"Shattered" (Live)	4:24
15.	"Pristine" (Live)	5:11
16.	"Medley" (Instrumental)	3:27

The 10th Anniversary Edition (CD 2) - Instrumentals
No.	Title	Length
1.	"Sever"	4:53
2.	"Frozen"	4:43
3.	"Silhouette of a Dancer"	5:25
4.	"No Compliance"	5:10
5.	"See Me in Shadow"	4:41
6.	"Shattered"	4:20
7.	"The Gathering"	3:35
8.	"Daylight Lucidity"	4:36
9.	"Sleepwalkers Dream"	4:27
10.	"A Day for Ghosts"	3:37
11.	"Pristine"	4:31

== Personnel ==
Band members

- Charlotte Wessels - lead vocals (except tracks 4 and 10)
- Martijn Westerholt - keyboards, orchestral arrangements, co-producer

Session musicians

- Marko Hietala - lead vocals on tracks 1, 4, 7, 8, 10, bass guitar on all tracks
- Ad Sluijter - guitar on tracks 1, 2, 4, 9, 10
- Guus Eikens - guitar on tracks 3, 6, 7, 8, 11, keyboards on track 7, backing vocals on tracks 1, 2, 7, 8, 10, 11
- Ariën van Weesenbeek - drums
- Rosan van der Aa - backing vocals on tracks 1, 2, 7, 8, 10, 11

Guest musicians

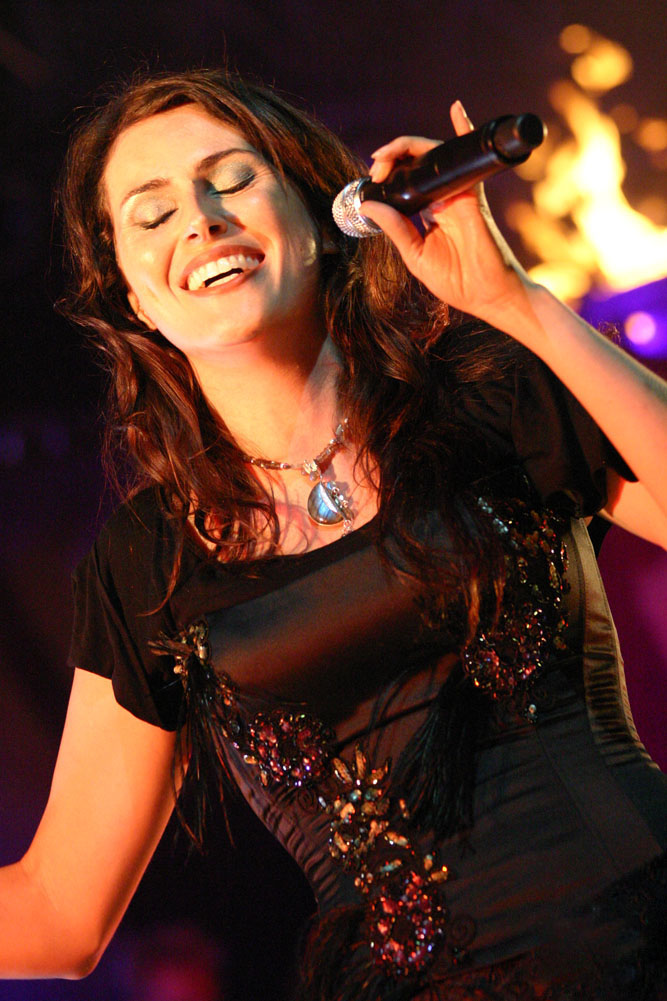
Sharon den Adel

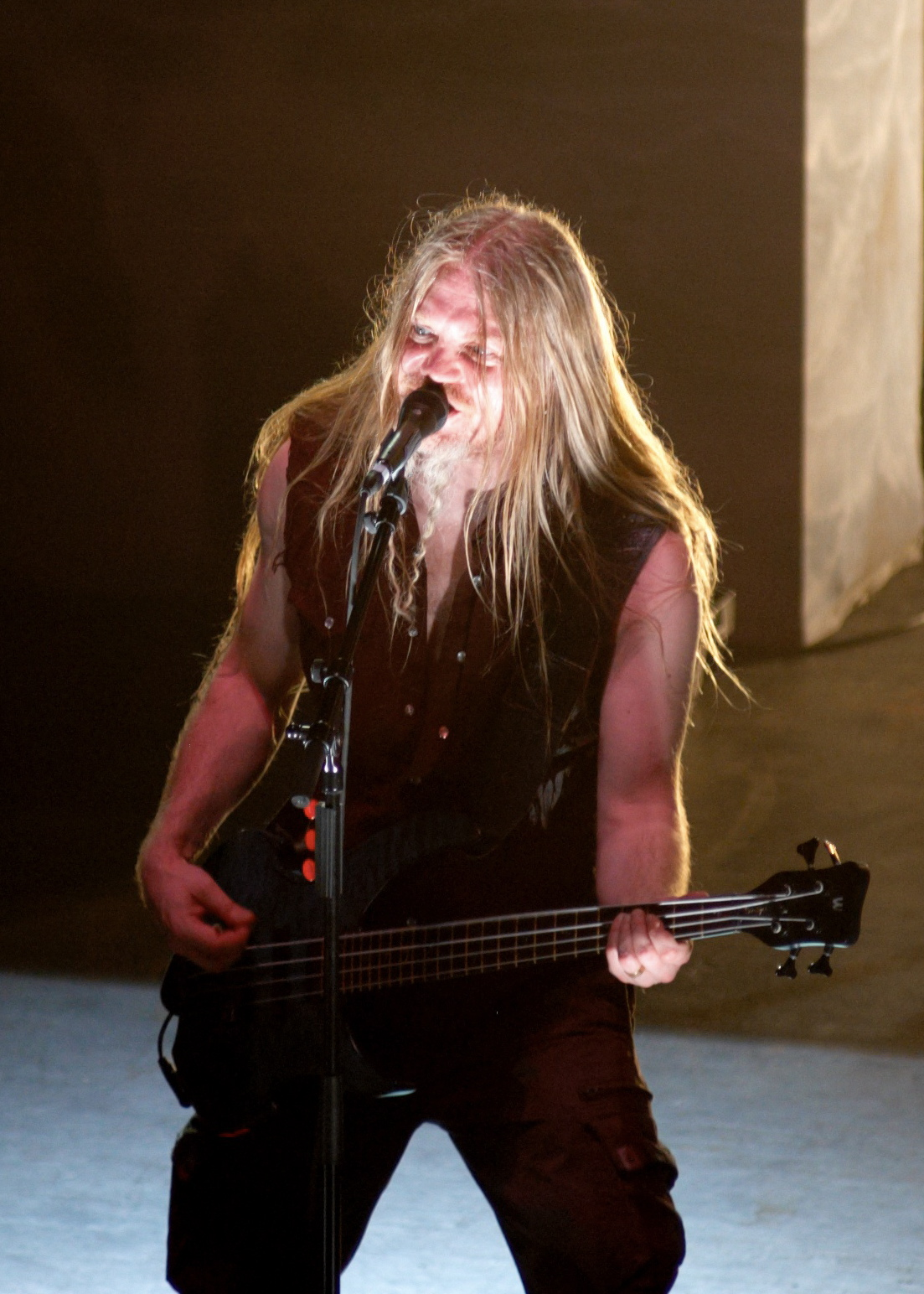
Marko Hietala

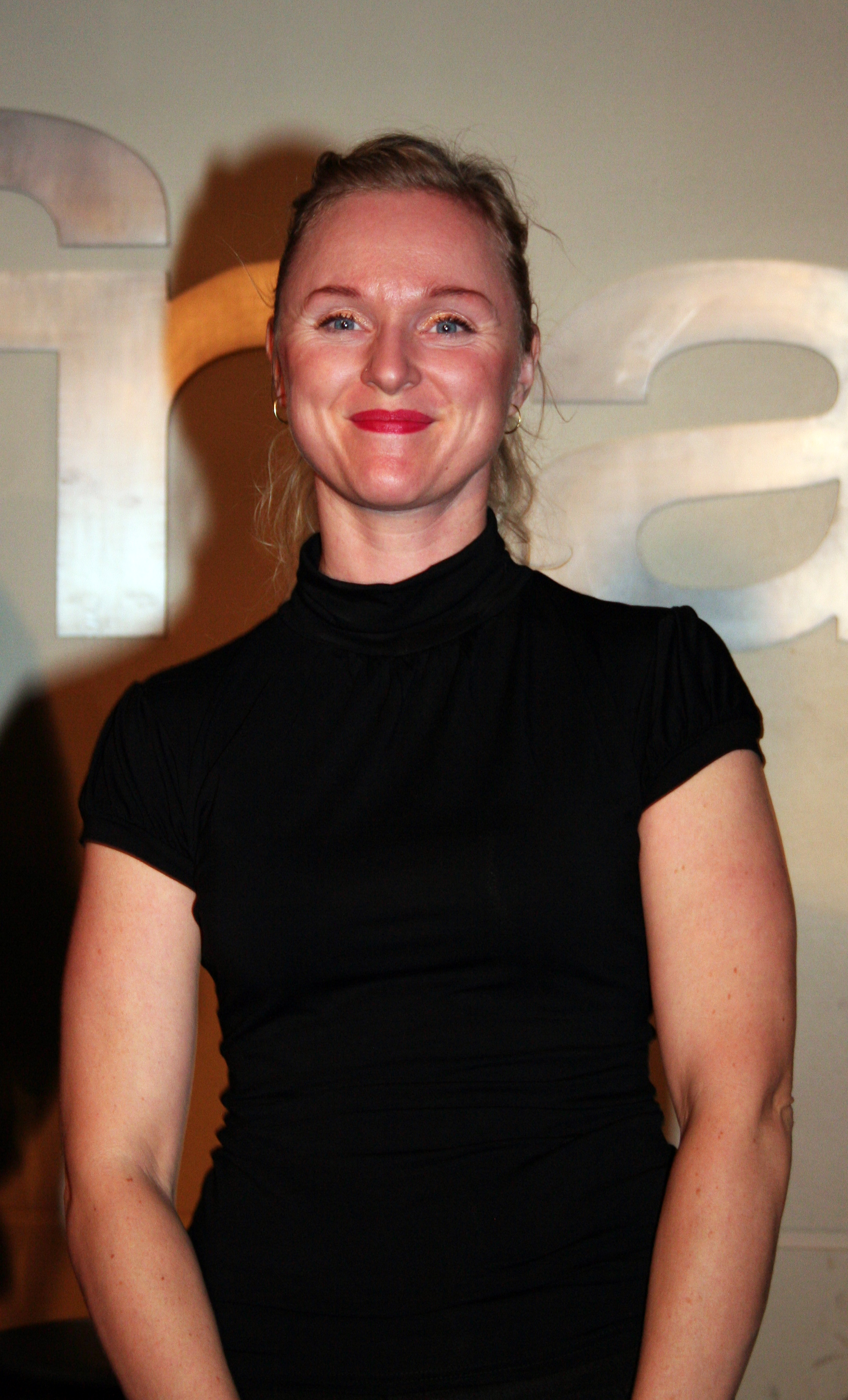
Liv Kristine

- Sharon den Adel - lead vocals on track 4
- Liv Kristine - lead vocals on tracks 5 and 10
- George Oosthoek - grunts on tracks 3, 11, 12
- Jan Yrlund - guitar on tracks 1, 4, 5
- Oliver Phillips - guitar on track 4, orchestral arrangements, producer
- Rupert Gillett - cello on tracks 3, 4, 5

Touring members

- Ronald Landa - guitars, backing vocals
- Rob van der Loo - bass
- Sander Zoer - drums

Technical personnel

- Christian Moos, Tero Kinnunen, Daniël Gibson, Alexander Krull - engineers
- Stefan Helleblad - mixing
- Thomas Eberger - mastering
