= We Came with the Northern Winds: En Saga i Belgia =

Leaves' Eyes DVD/CD

Video by Leaves' Eyes
- Released: 27 February 2009
- Recorded: Metal Female Voices Fest, Wieze, Belgium, 20 October 2007
- Genre: Symphonic metal
- Length: 155 min. (DVD 1); 91 min. (DVD 2)
- Label: Napalm
- Director: Stefan Liebhauser, Alexander Krull
- Producer: Mastersound Entertainment & Leaves' Eyes

We Came with the Northern Winds: En Saga i Belgia

Live album by Leaves' Eyes
- Released: 27 February 2009
- Recorded: Metal Female Voices Fest, Wieze, Belgium, 20 October 2007
- Genre: Symphonic metal
- Length: 85 min.
- Label: Napalm
- Producer: Alexander Krull

Leaves' Eyes chronology
Legend Land (2006)	We Came with the Northern Winds: En Saga i Belgia (2009)	My Destiny (2009)

We Came with the Northern Winds: En Saga i Belgia is a double DVD and double CD from the symphonic metal band Leaves' Eyes. The package was released on 27 February 2009 and the band started to promote it with an acoustic tour and signing session. The first DVD features almost two hours of documentary with in-depth interviews of the band members at home, in studio and on tour. The second DVD contains live footage of a Leaves' Eyes concert at Metal Female Voices Fest in Wieze, Belgium, on 20 October 2007. The two CDs replicate the concert soundtrack.

== Track listings ==
=== DVD 1 ===
Documentary

1. "From Fjords and Myths"
2. "The Story of Leaves Eyes"
3. "Ode to a Seamaid"
4. "Musical Nature"
5. "The Saga of Vinland"
6. "Sounds of Strings"
7. "Across European Borders"
8. "Dark Emotions"
9. "Mexican Tales"
10. "Strange Melodies"
11. "Viva Southamerica"
12. "Angelique Voices"
13. "Going Downunder"
14. "The Beauty and the Beast"
15. "American Dreams"
16. "The Passage"

Video clips

1. "Elegy"
2. "Into your Light"
3. "Farewell Proud Men" (From Mexico to Russia)
4. "Legend Land"
5. "New Found Land"
6. "The Thorn" (Live at Masters of Rock)
7. "The Crossing - America 2006 A.D." (Trailer)

=== DVD 2 - Live at MFVF '07 ===
1. "Intro – Vinland Saga"
2. "Farewell Proud Men"
3. "Ocean's Way"
4. "The Crossing"
5. "Into Your Light"
6. "The Thorn"
7. "Mourning Tree"
8. "For Amelie"
9. "Skraelings"
10. "Temptation"
11. "Tales of the Seamaid"
12. "New Found Land"
13. "Leaves' Eyes"
14. "Solemn Sea"
15. "Amhrán (Song of the Winds)"
16. "Norwegian Lovesong"
17. "Lyset"
18. "Legend Land"
19. "Elegy"
20. "Outro – Mot Fjerne Land"
- Making of
- Photogallery

=== CD 1 ===
1. "Intro – Vinland Saga"
2. "Farewell Proud Men"
3. "Ocean's Way"
4. "The Crossing"
5. "Into Your Light"
6. "The Thorn"
7. "Mourning Tree"
8. "For Amelie"
9. "Skraelings"
10. "Temptation"

=== CD 2 ===
1. "Tales of the Seamaid"
2. "New Found Land"
3. "Leaves' Eyes"
4. "Solemn Sea"
5. "Amrhan"
6. "Norwegian Lovesong"
7. "Lyset"
8. "Legend Land"
9. "Elegy"
10. "Outro – Mot fjerne land"
