= Siirala =

Siirala is a Finnish surname. Notable people with the surname include:

- Antti Siirala (born 1979), Finnish classical pianist
- Elina Siirala (born 1983), Finnish soprano and vocal coach
- Martti Olavi Siirala (1922–2008), Finnish psychiatrist, psychoanalyst and philosopher
