= Elina Siirala =

Finnish singer (born 1983)

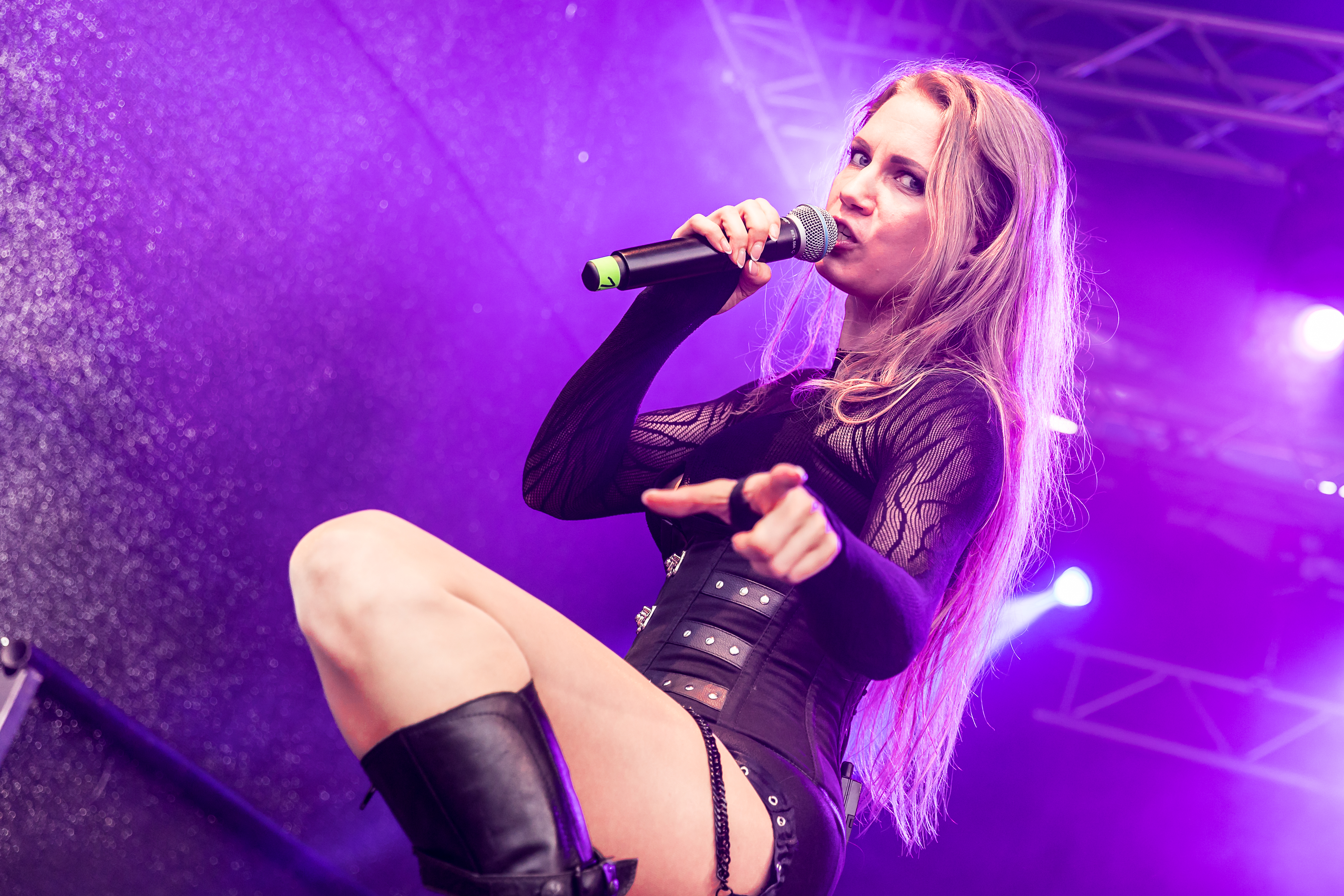
- Siirala performing at Rock & Metal Day'z 2025

Background information
- Born: 27 October 1983 (age 42); Helsinki, Finland
- Genres: Melodic metal, symphonic metal
- Occupation: Singer
- Years active: 2011–present

Elina Siirala (born 27 October 1983) is a Finnish soprano. She is the founder and frontwoman for the English melodic metal band Angel Nation (formerly EnkElination) and the current female vocalist for the German symphonic metal/viking metal band Leaves' Eyes. Siirala is the second cousin of Tuomas Holopainen, founder and keyboardist of Nightwish.

== Career ==
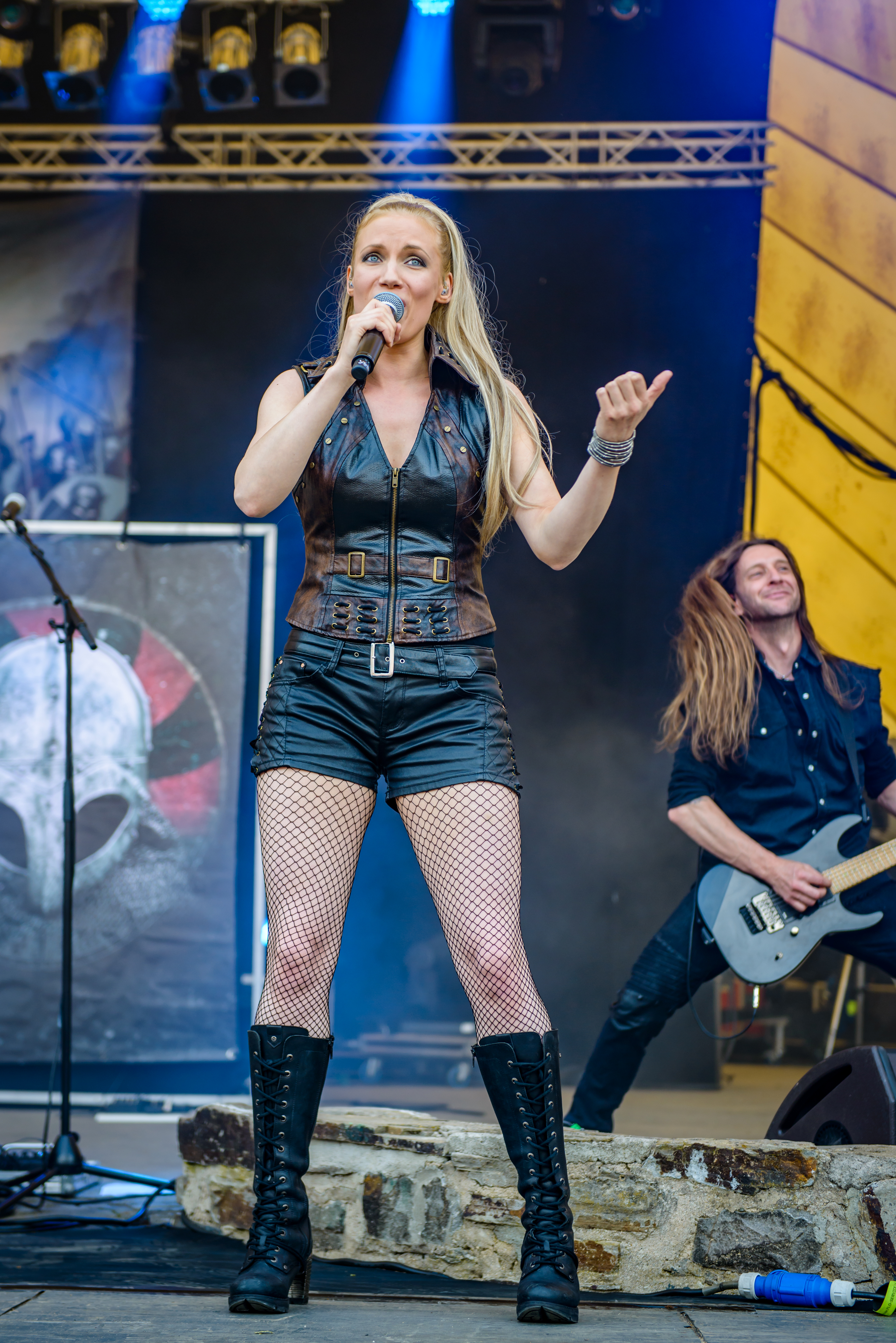
Siirala in 2016

After completing a bachelor's degree in classical singing in Helsinki, Siirala moved to London in 2008 to study contemporary vocals.

In 2011, she formed the melodic metal band EnkElination, the band name being a play on words featuring "enkeli", the Finnish word for "angel", and also her name "Elina" in the middle. In 2016, the band announced they would translate their name to "Angel Nation".

The new band name of Angel Nation was shortly followed on 12 April 2016 by the announcement of a new drummer Lucas Robert Williamson joining existing members Shadow on guitar and Julia on bass.

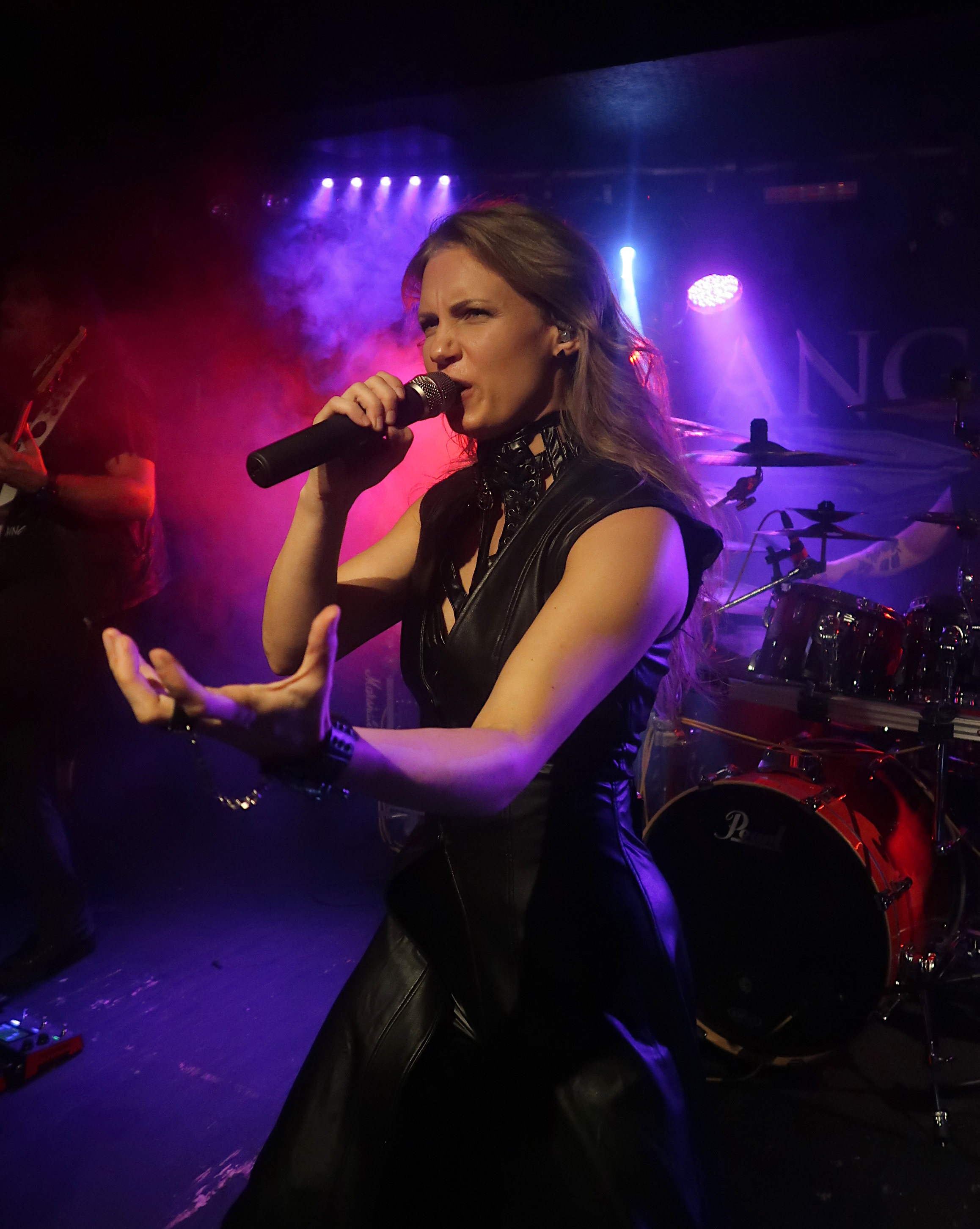
Siirala in 2022

The band played several live shows both headlining venues such as the Camden Underworld and supporting larger bands, as well as festival appearances including Bloodstock Open Air in 2014 and Dames of Darkness in 2015. She came to the attention of Leaves' Eyes during one of those support slots, and in 2016 she was invited to join Leaves' Eyes to replace departing singer Liv Kristine.

In 2016, Siirala toured the United States with Leaves Eyes. In October 2016, she released the single "Do It Anyway" with her band Angel Nation via Nuclear Blast. The single was accompanied by a video produced by Caz Reason and featured fellow band members Shadow, Julia and Lucas.

In 2017, Leaves Eyes announced another tour of the United States alongside Sabaton while Siirala also returned to work on recordings for Angel Nation's second album Aeon. Aeon was released on 27 October 2017 with a small European tour announced alongside Elyose.

== Discography ==
=== Angel Nation ===
==== Albums ====
- Tears of Lust (2014)
- Aeon (2017)
- Antares (2022)

==== Singles ====
- Do It Anyway (2016)

==== Music videos ====
- Tears of Lust (2014)
- Last Time Together (2015)
- Do it Anyway (2016)
- Burn the Witch (2017)

=== Leaves' Eyes ===
==== Albums ====
- Sign of the Dragonhead (2018)
- The Last Viking (2020)
- Myths of Fate (2024)

==== EPs ====
- Fires in the North (2016)
- Black Butterfly (2019)
- Song of Darkness (2026)

==== Music videos ====
- Edge of Steel (2016)
- Fires in the North (2016)
- Sign of the Dragonhead (2017)
- Across the Sky (2018)
- Dark Love Empress (2020)
- Chain of the Golden Horn (2020)
- War of Kings (2020)

=== Guest performances ===
- Orden Ogan - Absolution for our final days (2022)
