= King of Kings (Leaves' Eyes album) =

Studio album by Leaves' Eyes
- Released: September 11, 2015
- Genre: Symphonic metal
- Length: 43:08 (standard); 51:08 (deluxe); 1:44:30 (gold)
- Label: AFM Records, Nuclear Blast
- Producer: Alexander Krull

Leaves' Eyes chronology
Symphonies of the Night (2013)	King of Kings (2015)	Sign of the Dragonhead (2018)

Singles from King of Kings
- 1. "Halvdan the Black" Released: August 8, 2015; 2. "The Waking Eye" Released: August 28, 2015

King of Kings is the sixth studio album by the German symphonic metal band Leaves' Eyes. It contains guest appearances of (among others) Simone Simons from the Dutch symphonic metal band Epica and Lindy-Fay Hella from the Norwegian dark folk act Wardruna. It is their last album with Liv Kristine on vocals.

== Track listing ==
No.	Title	Length
1.	"Sweven" (Prelude)	2:03
2.	"King of Kings"	4:47
3.	"Halvdan the Black"	4:22
4.	"The Waking Eye"	4:41
5.	"Feast of the Year" (Interlude)	0:37
6.	"Vengeance Venom"	3:17
7.	"Sacred Vow"	4:20
8.	"Edge of Steel" (featuring Simone Simons)	5:06
9.	"Haraldskvæði"	3:24
10.	"Blazing Waters" (featuring Lindy-Fay Hella)	7:30
11.	"Swords in Rock"	3:01
Total length:		43:08

Deluxe edition
No.	Title	Length
12.	"Spellbound"	4:06
13.	"Trail of Blood"	3:54
Total length:		51:08

Exclusive Gold Edition - Bonus CD
No.	Title	Length
14.	"The Waking Eye" (piano) (featuring Oliver Palotai)	3:35
15.	"Swords in Rock" (acoustic)	3:07
16.	"Vengeance Venom" (acoustic)	3:24
17.	"Sweven" (instrumental)	2:03
18.	"King of Kings" (instrumental)	4:47
19.	"Halvdan the Black" (instrumental)	4:22
20.	"The Waking Eye" (instrumental)	4:41
21.	"Feast of the Year" (instrumental)	0:38
22.	"Vengeance Venom" (instrumental)	3:17
23.	"Sacred Vow" (instrumental)	4:21
24.	"Edge of Steel" (instrumental)	5:06
25.	"Haraldskvæði" (instrumental)	3:25
26.	"Blazing Waters" (instrumental)	7:31
27.	"Swords in Rock" (instrumental)	3:01
Total length:		1:44:30

=== Editions ===
- The exclusive gold edition (released throughout Nuclear Blast) is limited to 300 box sets with golden swords, limited double CD in Media Book, golden swords sculpture in the style of the album story and a handwritten letter from singer Liv Kristine.
- The US Edition, released in 2016, features unique cover art and a re-recording of "Edge of Steel" with Leaves' Eyes's new vocalist Elina Siirala, following Liv Kristine's departure. This version of the song also appears on the band's 2016 EP Fires in the North and has its own music video.

== Personnel ==
Leaves' Eyes

- Thorsten Bauer - bass, guitars
- Liv Kristine - female vocals
- Alexander Krull - vocals, keyboards, samples, producer
- Joris Nijenhuis - drums
- Pete Streit - guitars

Guest musicians

- White Russian Symphony Orchestra - orchestra (directed by Victor Smolski)
- Simone Simons - vocals on Edges of Steel
- Lindy-Fay Hella - vocals on Blazing Waters
- London Voices - choir ensemble
- Oliver Palotai - piano on The Waking Eye
- Leon Krull - spoken words on Sweven
- Christian Roch - uilleann pipes, whistles
- Christoph Kutzer - cello
- Janna Kirchhof - nyckelharpa
- Kathrin Schlumpf - harp
- Elvya Dulcimer - hammered dulcimer
- Fieke van den Hurk - hurdy gurdy
- Sophie Zaaijer - solo violin
- Knuth Jerxsen - percussions

Design

- Stefan Heilemann - artwork

== Charts ==
Chart (2015)	Peak position
Belgian Albums (Ultratop Flanders)	90
Belgian Albums (Ultratop Wallonia)	130
Dutch Albums (Album Top 100)	83
German Albums (Offizielle Top 100)	15
Swiss Albums (Schweizer Hitparade)	54
UK Independent Albums (OCC)	34
UK Rock & Metal Albums (OCC)	20
