= Meredead =

- Cover art by Stefan Heilemann

Studio album by Leaves' Eyes
- Released: 22 April 2011
- Recorded: Mastersound Studios, Steinheim, Germany, 2010-2011
- Genre: Symphonic metal
- Length: 55:16
- Language: English, Nynorsk
- Label: Napalm
- Producer: Alexander Krull

Leaves' Eyes chronology
Njord (2009)	Meredead (2011)	Symphonies of the Night (2013)

Professional ratings
Review scores
Source	Rating
Metal Storm	(very favorable)
About.com	4/5 stars
Metal Underground	3.5/5 stars
Femme Metal	(95/100)
Metal Temple	7/10 stars
Rockfreaks.net	(7/10)

Meredead is the fourth studio album by the German/Norwegian symphonic metal band Leaves' Eyes. It was released on 22 April 2011 on Napalm Records. The Deluxe Edition of the album contains a bonus DVD with five songs from a live performance recorded at the Metal Female Voices Fest, in Wieze, Belgium, on 24 October 2010.

== Background ==
The title is inspired by the Old English compound noun meredēað, literally "sea-death", which is attested (in the genitive plural meredēaða) in the passage rodor swipode meredēaða mǣst, literally: "the greatest quantity of sea-deaths scourged the skies", in Exodus, the second poem of the Junius manuscript, in the section telling the story of the Crossing of the Red Sea. Alternatively, meredēað could be translated as "sea of death" or "deadly sea" in view of a later passage in the same text: meredēað geswealh, literally "sea-death swallowed". On her website, Liv Kristine explicitly recommends Marsden 2004, and quotes the explanation for meredēað given in the book, saying that Meredead could be translated as "dead by the sea".

Produced by Alexander Krull, the album blends the folk elements from earlier works to shape Meredead's atmospheric tone. The opening track, "Spirits' Masquerade," incorporates folk instrumentation, enriching the album’s diverse sound. Tracks like Étaín and Sigrlinn lyrically evoke the mysticism of ancient cultures, featuring uilleann pipes to enhance their thematic depth. The album also includes more traditional songs, such as Nystev and Kråkevisa; the latter employs the Scandinavian nyckelharpa, or keyed fiddle. A cover of To France reinterprets the tragedy and emotion of Mike Oldfield's classic. Supporting vocals and instrumentation on the album are provided by Maite Itoiz and John Kelly (Elfenthal), Carmen Espenæs, the Norwegian Anette Guldbrandsen, and Victor Smolski's Lingua Mortis Orchestra.

== Track lists ==
All lyrics are written by Liv Kristine Espenæs; all music is composed by Alexander Krull and Thorsten Bauer, except where noted.

No.	Title	Writer(s)	Length
1.	"Spirits' Masquerade"		6:31
2.	"Étaín"		3:58
3.	"Velvet Heart"		3:42
4.	"Kråkevisa" ("Crow's Ballad")	traditional	4:34
5.	"To France" (Mike Oldfield cover)	Mike Oldfield	4:37
6.	"Meredead" ("The Deadly Sea")		5:19
7.	"Sigrlinn"		8:47
8.	"Mine tåror er ei grimme" ("My Tears Are Not Hideous")		2:54
9.	"Empty Horizon"		4:58
10.	"Veritas" ("Truth")		0:48
11.	"Nystev" ("New Stave")	traditional	4:39
12.	"Tell-Tale Eyes"		3:58

Bonus track
No.	Title	Length
13.	"Sorhleod" ("Song of Sorrow")	5:04

Japanese edition bonus tracks
No.	Title	Writer(s)	Length
14.	"Melusine"		3:34
15.	"Legend Land" (acoustic)	Espenæs, Krull, Bauer, Chris Lukhaup, Mathias Röderer.	3:46

Deluxe edition bonus DVD
No.	Title	Length
1.	"Njord"
2.	"My Destiny"
3.	"Ragnarok"
4.	"Elegy"
5.	"Frøya's Theme"

== Personnel ==
=== Leaves' Eyes ===
- Liv Kristine Espenæs – lead and backing vocals
- Alexander Krull – harsh vocals, keyboards, programming, samples
- Thorsten Bauer – guitars, bass, mandolin on tracks 1, 5 and 12
- Sander van der Meer - guitars
- Roland Navratil - drums, percussions

=== Additional musicians ===
- Lingua Mortis Orchestra from Minsk, Belarus, directed by Victor Smolski
- Al dente Choir from Kleinbottwar, Germany, directed by Veronika Messmer
- Anette Guldbrandsen - backing vocals, lead vocals on tracks 4, 8, 10, 11
- Carmen Elise Espenæs - lead and backing vocals on track 7
- Maite Itoiz - lead and backing vocals on tracks 2 and 6, baroque guitar on track 12
- John Kelly - lead vocals on track 12
- Christian Roch - Uilleann pipes and whistles
- Janna Kirchhof - fiddle on tracks 2, 3 and 11, nyckelharpa on track 4

=== Production ===
- Alexander Krull - producer, engineer, mixing and mastering at Mastersound Studios
- Thorsten Bauer, Liv Kristine Espenæs - assistant engineers
- Victor Smolski - orchestra recording engineer
- Orchestral arrangements by Leaves' Eyes

== Charts ==
Chart (2011)	Peak position
German Albums Chart	32
Ultratop Belgian Chart (Flanders)	97
UK Indie Chart	37
US Top Heatseekers	37
US Independent Albums	134
