= Lovelorn =

Lovelorn may refer to:

- Lovelorn (album), an album by Leaves' Eyes
- Lovelorn (film), a Turkish film
- The Lovelorn, a 1927 American silent film
