= Libertine (Liv Kristine album) =

Studio album by Liv Kristine
- Released: September 7th, 2012
- Genre: Gothic rock, Pop rock
- Length: 39:40
- Label: Napalm
- Producer: Alexander Krull

Liv Kristine chronology
Skintight (2010)	Libertine (2012)	Vervain (2014)

Libertine is the fourth solo studio album by the Norwegian artist Liv Kristine.

The album was rated a 6.5 out of 10 by Metal Forces.

== Track listing ==
1. "Interlude" - 2:23
2. "Solve Me" - 3:46
3. "Silence" - 3:49
4. "Vanilla Skin Delight" - 4:09
5. "Panic" - 3:31
6. "Paris Paris" - 3:40
7. "Wait for Rain" - 3:32
8. "Love Crime" - 2:24
9. "Libertine" - 4:45
10. "Meet Me in the Red Sky" - 5:11
11. "The Man with the Child in His Eyes" (Kate Bush cover) - 2:30

== Personnel ==
- Liv Kristine - vocals
- Thorsten Bauer - guitars. bass guitar
- Alexander Krull - keyboards, programming, samples
- Felix Born - drums
- Alessandro Pantò - piano

== Additional personnel ==
- Tobias Regner - vocals on "Vanilla Skin Delight"
- Christoph Kutzer - cello
