= The Last Viking =

The Last Viking may refer to:

- The Last Viking (album)
- The Last Viking (1997 film)
- The Last Viking (2025 film)
- Harald Hardrada, king of Norway
