= Eterno (Romanthica album) =

Studio album by Romanthica
- Released: March 18, 2014
- Recorded: 2012
- Genre: Gothic rock, gothic metal
- Length: 57:24
- Label: Fair Warning
- Producer: David Castillo

Romanthica chronology
| Regreso al Sur del Edén (Demo) (2006) | Eterno (2014) |

Eterno is the first album by Romanthica. The album was self-released twice in 2012 and 2013, then re-released in 2014 under the sub-label Fair Warning / Gran Sol. The track Despierta features ex-Leaves' Eyes member Liv Kristine. A digital download single of Mercurio was released in 2013.

== Music video ==
Two music videos were released from the album, the first was Mercurio released on Sep 1, 2013 and Muriel released on May 14, 2014, both directed and produced by Xavi Díaz from Nova Era Produccions.

== Track listing ==
Track listing
| No. | Title | Writer(s) | Length |
|---|---|---|---|
| 1. | "Despierta" | David Gohe | 5:15 |
| 2. | "Mercurio" | David Gohe | 6:31 |
| 3. | "Sacrificado" | David Gohe | 4:25 |
| 4. | "Nada" | David Gohe | 4:29 |
| 5. | "Muriel" | David Gohe | 5:08 |
| 6. | "Mejor Será Olvidar" | David Gohe | 6:44 |
| 7. | "El Vientre Del Huracán" | David Gohe | 5:15 |
| 8. | "Regreso Al Sur Del Edén" | David Gohe | 5:26 |
| 9. | "La Cura" | David Gohe | 5:52 |
| 10. | "Al Final" | David Gohe | 4:22 |
| 11. | "Despierta (Bonus track)" (featuring Liv Kristine) | David Gohe | 5:17 |

== Personnel ==
Taken from the album's booklet:

- David Gohe – songwriting
- Mats Limpan – mastering
- David Castillo – recording, producer
- Alexander Krull – recording, producer (track 11)
