= My Destiny (EP) =

- Cover design by Stefan Heilemann

EP by Leaves' Eyes
- Released: 24 July 2009
- Recorded: Mastersound Studios, Steinheim, Germany, 2009
- Genre: Symphonic metal
- Length: 23:58
- Label: Napalm
- Producer: Alexander Krull

Leaves' Eyes chronology
We Came with the Northern Winds: En Saga i Belgia (2009)	My Destiny (2009)	Njord (2009)

My Destiny is a maxi single/EP by the symphonic metal band Leaves' Eyes, released on 24 July 2009. The songs "My Destiny" and "Northbound" are extracts from the then upcoming album Njord. The rest of the tracks are exclusive to this release.

On 28 August 2009, the band released the music video for the title track. In the video, a Norse warrior leaves his home to fight in a war after his wife gives him a necklace. While fighting, the necklace falls off and is retrieved by an enemy. He brings it back to the wife, telling her the owner is dead. She commits suicide by jumping off a cliff, her body later retrieved by her husband who is still alive. Angry, he slays several more enemies.

== Track listing ==
All lyrics are written by Liv Kristine Espenæs Krull; all music is composed by Alexander Krull, Mathias Röderer, Thorsten Bauer, except where noted.

No.	Title	Writer(s)	Length
1.	"My Destiny"		4:13
2.	"The Battle of Maldon"		4:23
3.	"Scarborough Fair" (acoustic version)	Traditional	3:24
4.	"Northbound"		4:22
5.	"Nine Wave Maidens"		3:24
6.	"My Destiny" (remix)		4:12
Total length:			23:58

== Personnel ==
=== Leaves' Eyes ===
- Liv Kristine Espenæs Krull – vocals
- Alexander Krull – vocals, keyboards, programming, samples
- Thorsten Bauer – guitars
- Mathias Röderer – guitars
- Alla Fedynitch – bass
- Seven Antonopoulos – drums

=== Additional musicians ===
- Lingua Mortis Orchestra from Minsk, Belarus, directed by Victor Smolski
- Al dente Choir from Kleinbottwar, Germany, directed by Veronika Messmer
- Christian Roch - Uilleann pipes on "Scarborough Fair"

=== Production ===
- Alexander Krull - producer, engineer, mixing and mastering at Mastersound Studios
- Mathias Röderer, Thorsten Bauer - assistant engineers
- Victor Smolski - orchestra recording engineer

== Charts ==
Chart (2009)	Peak position
French Singles Chart	54
