= Vervain (Liv Kristine album) =

Studio album by Liv Kristine
- Released: 2014
- Recorded: 2013–2014
- Genre: Gothic metal
- Length: 56:52
- Label: Napalm
- Producer: Alexander Krull

Liv Kristine chronology
Libertine (2012)	Vervain (2014)	River of Diamonds (2023)

Vervain is the fifth album by female vocalist and lyricist Liv Kristine. It was released in 2014 on Napalm Records.

== Track listing ==
All lyrics are written by Liv Kristine; all music is composed by Thorsten Bauer, Alexander Krull

No.	Title	Length
1.	"My Wilderness"	03:31
2.	"Love Decay (feat. Michelle Darkness)"	04:42
3.	"Vervain"	05:00
4.	"Stronghold of Angels (feat. Doro Pesch)"	04:10
5.	"Hunters"	03:32
6.	"Lotus"	03:46
7.	"Elucidation"	03:45
8.	"Two and a Heart"	05:09
9.	"Creeper"	03:49
10.	"Oblivious"	04:52

Limited edition has three bonus tracks, two of which are vocal re-recordings of Stronghold of Angels and Love Decay with only Liv on vocals.

No.	Title	Length
11.	"Unbreakable"	04:21
12.	"Love Decay"	04:59
13.	"Stronghold of Angels"	04:42

== Production ==
- Produced, recorded, engineered, mixed and mastered by Alexander Krull
- Assistant recording engineers: Thorsten Bauer & Matthias Röderer
- Additional Programming & Samples by Alexander Krull
- Recorded at Mastersound Studio, Steinheim, Germany

== Personnel ==
- Liv Kristine - Vocals
- Thorsten Bauer - Guitars, Guitars (acoustic), Saz, Flamenco Guitars, Mandolin, Sitar, Oud, Piano
- Alexander Krull - Keyboards, Programming, Samples
- Felix Born - Drums
- Alessandro Pantò - Piano

=== Additional personnel ===
- Michelle Darkness - additional vocals, Love Decay
- Doro Pesch - additional vocals, Stronghold Of Angels
