= Njord (album) =

- Cover design by Stefan Heilemann

Studio album by Leaves' Eyes
- Released: 26 August 2009
- Recorded: Mastersound Studios, Steinheim, Germany, 2009
- Genre: Symphonic metal
- Length: 55:56
- Language: English, Norwegian
- Label: Napalm
- Producer: Alexander Krull

Leaves' Eyes chronology
My Destiny (2009)	Njord (2009)	Meredead (2010)

Singles from Njord
- 1. "My Destiny"/"Northbound" Released: 24 July 2009

Professional ratings
Review scores
Source	Rating
Allmusic	3.5/5 stars
About.com	4/5 stars
BBC	(positive)
Sputnikmusic	3.5/5 stars
Sea of Tranquility	4/5 stars

Njord is the third studio album by the German/Norwegian symphonic metal band Leaves' Eyes, released on 28 August 2009 on Napalm Records. Njörðr comes from Norse mythology and is a name associated to the Vanir god of the sea and the wind.

In this album the band used for the first time a full orchestra and choir and wrote for them suitable arrangements.

The album was also released in a digipak deluxe edition, including two bonus tracks and a model of a Viking longship with Leaves' Eyes logo on the sail.

== Track listing ==
All lyrics are written by Liv Kristine Espenæs; all music is composed by Alexander Krull, Mathias Röderer, Thorsten Bauer, except where noted.

No.	Title	Writer(s)	Length
1.	"Njord"		6:14
2.	"My Destiny"		4:13
3.	"Emerald Island"		5:24
4.	"Take the Devil in Me"		3:51
5.	"Scarborough Fair"	Traditional	4:04
6.	"Through Our Veins"		3:40
7.	"Irish Rain"		4:01
8.	"Northbound"		4:23
9.	"Ragnarok"		5:11
10.	"Morgenland" ("The Morning Land")		2:54
11.	"The Holy Bond"		3:41
12.	"Frøya's Theme"		8:20
Total length:			55:56

Limited edition bonus tracks
No.	Title	Length
13.	"Landscape of the Dead"	4:36
14.	"Les Champs de Lavande" ("Lavender Fields")	2:41
Total length:		63:13

== Personnel ==
=== Leaves' Eyes ===
- Liv Kristine Espenæs – vocals
- Alexander Krull – vocals, keyboards, programming, samples
- Thorsten Bauer – guitars, bass
- Mathias Röderer – guitars
- Alla Fedynitch – bass (credited, but does not appear on the album)
- Seven Antonopoulos – drums

=== Additional musicians ===
- Lingua Mortis Orchestra from Minsk, Belarus, directed by Victor Smolski
- Al dente Choir from Kleinbottwar, Germany, directed by Veronika Messmer
- Christian Roch - Uilleann pipes and whistles on "Scarborough Fair" and "Irish Rain"
- Anette Gulbrandsen - backing vocals on "Northbound"
- Gunnar Sauermann, Cristoph Sutzer, Robert Suß, Uwe Fichtner, Markus Rutten, Steven Willems, Stefan Heilemann - Vikings on "Njord"

=== Production ===
- Alexander Krull - producer, engineer, mixing and mastering at Mastersound Studios
- Mathias Röderer, Thorsten Bauer - assistant engineers
- Victor Smolski - orchestra recording engineer

== Charts ==
Chart (2009)	Peak position
Belgian Flander Albums Chart (Ultratop)	58
Belgian Wallonia Albums Chart (Ultratop)	82
German Albums Chart (Media Control)	30
Swiss Albums Chart	88
UK Indie Chart	40
US Independent Albums	105

== Release history ==
Region	Date	Label	Format
Spain, Finland	26 August 2009	Napalm Records	Compact disc
Germany, Austria, Switzerland, Italy, Sweden, Benelux, France	28 August 2009	Napalm Records	Compact disc
Internationally	28 August 2009	Napalm Records	Deluxe CD packaging containing Viking Longship model and extra sticker (limited to 500 copies)
The rest of Europe	31 August 2009	Napalm Records	Compact disc
Canada	1 September 2009	Napalm Records	Compact disc
United States	29 September 2009	Napalm Records	Compact disc
