= Symphonies of the Night =

- Album cover art design by Stefan Heilemann

Studio album by Leaves' Eyes
- Released: 15 November 2013
- Recorded: 2013
- Studios: Mastersound Studio; Stuttgart, Germany
- Genre: Symphonic metal
- Length: 51:09
- Label: Napalm
- Producer: Alexander Krull

Leaves' Eyes chronology
Meredead (2011)	Symphonies of the Night (2013)	King of Kings (2015)

Singles from Symphonies of the Night
- 1. "Hell to the Heavens" Released: 8 November 2013

Professional ratings
Review scores
Source	Rating
Blabbermouth	4/5 stars
Scream Magazine	6/6 stars

Symphonies of the Night is the fifth studio album by the German/Norwegian symphonic metal band Leaves' Eyes. It was released in Europe on 15 November 2013, and in the US on 26 November 2013, through Napalm Records. The record was produced by Alexander Krull at Mastersound Studio, Germany and features album artwork by Stefan Heilemann. Like previous albums, Symphonies of the Night features songs sung in different languages, including English, Shakespearean English, Norwegian, French and Irish. The album title was said to be inspired by Symphony of the Swan Lake by Tchaikovsky.

== Track listing ==
All songs written and composed by Leaves' Eyes with the exception of "One Caress" written by Martin Gore.

No.	Title	Length
1.	"Hell to the Heavens"	4:32
2.	"Fading Earth"	4:33
3.	"Maid of Lorraine"	5:13
4.	"Galswintha"	4:14
5.	"Symphony of the Night"	4:58
6.	"Saint Cecelia"	4:12
7.	"Hymn to the Lone Sands"	5:22
8.	"Angel and the Ghost"	3:36
9.	"Éléonore de Provence" ("Eleanor from Provence")	6:24
10.	"Nightshade"	3:41
11.	"Ophelia"	4:24
12.	"Eileen's Ardency" (bonus track)	3:04
13.	"One Caress" (Depeche Mode cover) (bonus track)	3:30
Total length:		57:43

== Charts ==
Chart (2013)	Peak position
Belgian Albums Chart (Flanders)	172
Belgian Albums Chart (Wallonia)	124
German Albums Chart	49
UK Independent Albums (Official Charts)	33
UK Rock & Metal Albums (Official Charts)	18
US Top Heatseekers	18

== Personnel ==
Leaves' Eyes

- Liv Kristine Espenæs – vocals
- Alexander Krull – vocals, production
- Thorsten Bauer – guitar, bass guitar
- Sander van der Meer – guitar
- Felix Born – drums, percussion

Additional personnel

- Lingua Mortis Orchestra – orchestra
- Carmen Elise Espenæs – guest vocals on "Eileen's Ardency"
- Stefan Heilemann – album cover
- Liesbeth De Weer "Elvya Dulcimer" – hammered dulcimer on "Nightshade"
- Joris Nijenhuis – percussion
