= Myths of Fate =

Studio album by Leaves' Eyes
- Released: 26 March 2024
- Studio: Mastersound, Stuttgart, Germany
- Genre: Symphonic metal
- Length: 49:46
- Label: AFM
- Producer: Alexander Krull

Leaves' Eyes chronology
The Last Viking (2020)	Myths of Fate (2024)

Singles from Myths of Fate
- 1. "Forged By Fire" Released: 1 December 2023; 2. "Realm of Dark Waves" Released: 5 January 2024; 3. "Who Wants To Live Forever" Released: 2 February 2024; 4. "In Eternity" Released: 24 February 2024; 5. "Hammer of the Gods" Released: 22 March 2024

Professional ratings
Review scores
Source	Rating
Angry Metal Guy	2.5/5
Distorted Sound	5/10

Myths of Fate is the ninth studio album by German symphonic metal band Leaves' Eyes. It was released on 26 March 2024 by AFM Records. It is the last album to feature guitarist Micki Richter. The band promoted the album with a European tour in March and April 2024, supported by NorthTale, Metalite, and Catalyst Crime.

Singles/music videos were released for several tracks including "Forged by Fire", "In Eternity", and "Hammer of the Gods". The band has also released orchestral versions of "Sail with the Dead" and "Forged by Fire".

== Track listing ==
Myths of Fate track listing
No.	Title	Length
1.	"Forged by Fire"	4:43
2.	"Realm of Dark Waves"	4:58
3.	"Who Wants to Live Forever"	4:25
4.	"Hammer of the Gods"	4:34
5.	"In Eternity"	3:39
6.	"Fear the Serpent"	4:30
7.	"Goddess of the Night"	4:19
8.	"Sons of Triglav"	4:55
9.	"Elder Spirit"	3:49
10.	"Einherjar"	5:12
11.	"Sail with the Dead"	4:42
Total length:		49:46

== Personnel ==
Leaves' Eyes

- Joris Nijenhuis – drums, choir vocals
- Luc Gebhardt – guitar, bass
- Micki Richter – guitar, choir vocals
- Alexander Krull – growled vocals, keyboards, samples, programming
- Elina Siirala – clean vocals

Additional musicians

- Ivan Ferenc – choir vocals
- Uwe Fichtner – choir vocals
- Thomas Roth – nyckelharpa on track 5
- Lea-Sophie Fischer – fiddle on track 5
- Igor Górewicz – additional vocals on track 5
- Marcin Slezmir – additional vocals on track 5

Production

- Stefan Heilemann – artwork, cover concept, band photography

== Charts ==
Chart (2024)	Peak position
German Albums (Offizielle Top 100)	17
Swiss Albums (Schweizer Hitparade)	66
