= Kråkevisa =

Norwegian folk song

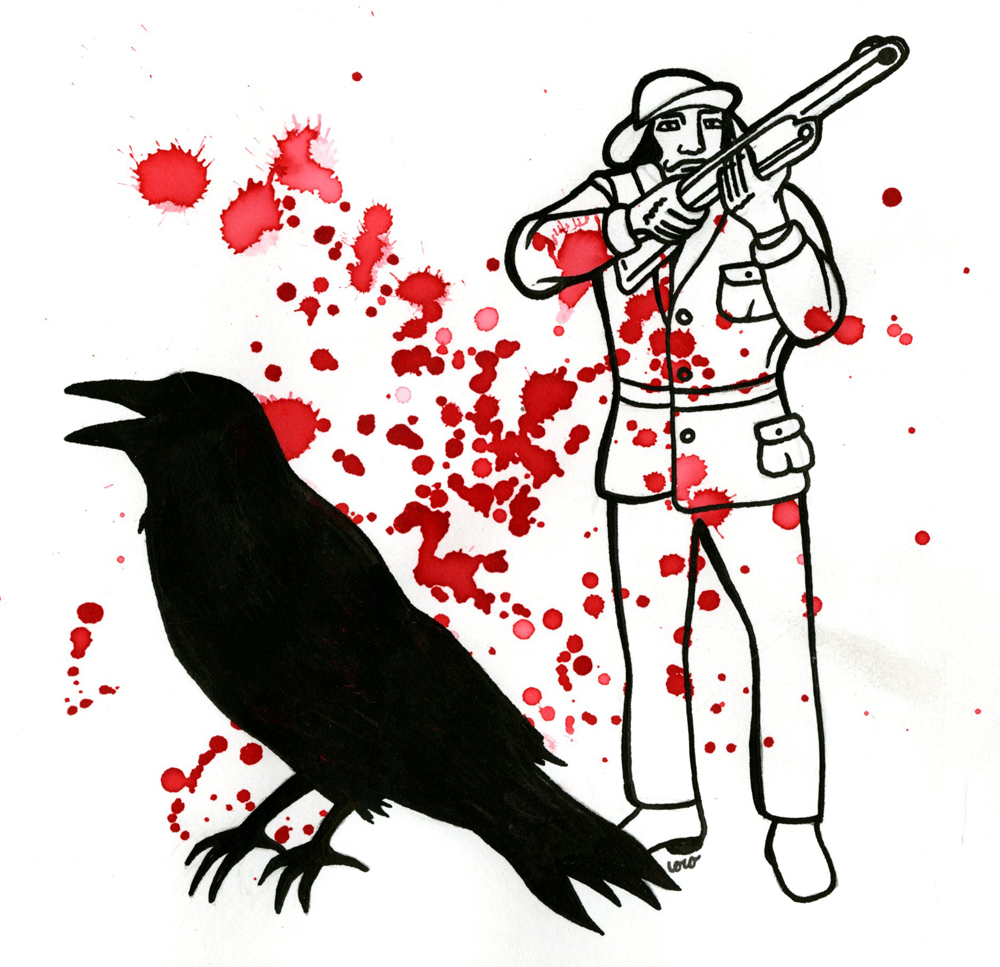
The Farmer and the Crow

Kråkevisa ("The Crow Song"), also known as Bonden og Kråka ("The Farmer and the Crow") and Mannen Han Gjekk Seg i Vedaskog ("The Man Went Into the Firewood Forest"), is a widespread Norwegian name for a folk song and jocular ballad spread over all of Scandinavia. There are different versions in Norway, which also uses other melodies. Kråkevisa was sometimes sung by two people as a duel song, where the loser was the one who forgot the verses, or was not able to come up with new verses. Variants are also known in Danish, Faroese, and Swedish.

Although the song is counted among the Scandinavian medieval ballads, it is still widely well-known, often as a song for children.

An 8-minute-long animation film Kråkevisa was released in 1962. It was directed by Wilfred Jensenius to a version of the song by Alf Prøysen and produced by Kommunenes Filmcentral A/S.

== Recordings (Norwegian) ==
- Lillebjørn Nilsen: ...og Fia hadde sko Polydor 2920 119, 1974
- Lillebjørn Nilsen: Norske Ballader: 30 ballader – Om drap og elskov, skjemt og lengsel blant riddere, jomfruer, kjemper og dyr. Grappa 2009, HCD 7239
- Tempest
- Morten Harket
- Spiritual Seasons
- Leaves' Eyes - 2011
- Arve Moen Bergset
- Wenche Myhre - Sanger fra dengang mor var liten 2 Polydor, 1976
- Turid Spildo, Nykkjen. Heilo, Grappa HCD 7196, 2005
- Myrkur (Amalie Bruun) - 2018
- Mortemia - 2023
