= Frozen (Delain song) =

2007 single by Delain

Single by Delain

from the album Lucidity
- Released: 8 January 2007
- Genre: Gothic metal
- Length: 4:01
- Label: Roadrunner
- Songwriter(s): Martijn Westerholt, Charlotte Wessels
- Producer(s): Oliver Phillips, Martijn Westerholt

Delain singles chronology
"Frozen" (2007)	"See Me in Shadow" (2007)

"Frozen" is the first single by the Dutch symphonic metal band Delain. It was released on 8 January 2007 by Roadrunner Records.

== Charts ==
Chart	Peak position
Dutch Top 40	36

== Track listing ==
1. "Frozen" – 4:01
2. "(Deep) Frozen" – 4:42
3. "Frozen Video Clip"

== Personnel ==
- Charlotte Wessels – vocals
- Ronald Landa – guitars
- Ray van Lente – guitars
- Ad Sluijter - guitar solo
- Rob van der Loo – bass
- Martijn Westerholt – keyboards
- Sander Zoer – drums
