= Vinland Saga (album) =

- Cover design by Stefan Heilemann

Studio album by Leaves' Eyes
- Released: 30 May 2005
- Recorded: Mastersound Studio, Fellbach/Stuttgart, Germany, 2005
- Genre: Symphonic metal
- Length: 45:43
- Language: English, Norwegian
- Label: Napalm
- Producer: Alexander Krull

Leaves' Eyes chronology
Elegy (2005)	Vinland Saga (2005)	Legend Land (2006)

Singles from Vinland Saga
- 1. "Elegy" Released: 2 May 2005

Professional ratings
Review scores
Source	Rating
Allmusic	3.5/5 stars
PopMatters	6/10 stars
Metal Hammer (GER)	5/7 stars
Exclaim!	(favorable)

Vinland Saga is the second full-length album by the symphonic metal band Leaves' Eyes, released in 2005. It is a concept album that tells the story of the voyage of the Norse explorer Leif Erikson and his discovery of Vinland. The main vocals are by the Norwegian singer Liv Kristine, but some harsh vocals performed by her former husband and producer Alexander Krull can be heard on the songs "Solemn Sea", "The Thorn", and "New Found Land".

A limited edition version of the album was released on 7 November 2006, which included two bonus tracks, a making-of video, an interview with Liv Kristine, as well as the music video produced for the single "Elegy" .

== Track listing ==
All lyrics are written by Liv Kristine Espenæs; all music is composed by Alexander Krull, Thorsten Bauer, Mathias Röderer and Christopher Lukhaup.

No.	Title	Length
1.	"Vinland Saga"	3:12
2.	"Farewell Proud Men"	4:04
3.	"Elegy"	5:07
4.	"Solemn Sea"	3:44
5.	"Leaves' Eyes"	3:59
6.	"The Thorn"	4:05
7.	"Misseri (Turn Green Meadows Into Grey)"	3:50
8.	"Amhrán (Song of the Winds)" (instrumental)	2:48
9.	"New Found Land"	3:28
10.	"Mourning Tree"	4:03
11.	"Twilight Sun"	3:22
12.	"Ankomst" ("The Arrival")	3:55
Total length:		45:43

Limited edition bonus tracks
No.	Title	Length
13.	"Heal"	3:58
14.	"For Amelie" (new version)	3:37
Total length:		53:18

Multimedia disc
No.	Title	Length
1.	"Elegy" (music video)	4:32
2.	"Interview (directed by Robert Suß)"	7:35
3.	"Making of a Saga (directed by Robert Suß)"	4:03
Total length:		16:10

== Personnel ==
=== Leaves' Eyes ===
- Liv Kristine Espenæs - lead vocals, keyboards
- Alexander Krull - death grunts, keyboards, programming, samples
- Thorsten Bauer - guitars, keyboards
- Mathias Röderer - guitars, keyboards
- Christopher Lukhaup - bass, keyboards
- Moritz Neuner - drums, percussion, keyboards

=== Additional musicians ===
- Robert & Johannes Suß, Norman Sickinger, Christof Kutzers, Anders Oddsberg, Steven Willems, Simone Sacco, Gunnar Sauermann, Sascha Henneberger, Markus Bruder, Jochen Steinsdorfer, Ralf Oechsle - backing vocals on "New Found Land"
- Timon Birkhofer - cello and piano on "Elegy", harp on "Amhran"
- Jana Kallenberg - violin

=== Production ===
- Produced, engineered, mixed and mastered by Alexander Krull at Mastersound Studios
- Assistant recording engineers: Mathias Röderer, Thorsten Bauer, Chris Lukhaup, Robert Suß

== Charts ==
Chart (2005)	Peak position
German Albums Chart	62
