= Romanthica =

- Origin: Barcelona, Spain
- Genres: Pop rock, gothic rock, gothic metal
- Years active: 2004–present
- Labels: Rock Estatal Records (current), Maldito Digital
- Members: David Gohe; Rubén Rosas
- Website: http://www.romanthica.com/

Romanthica is a gothic rock band from Barcelona formed in 2004 by members from bands like Embellish and Ironica.

== History ==
In 2004 the band self-released their first demo Al Final, followed by a second self-released demo in 2006 Regreso al Sur del Edén. The demo tracks were re-released in a studio album in 2014 in Eterno and a live album in 2016 MMXVII (Live). Two tracks from the demos were released in the 2017 single Recuerdos. A cover of Maná's Labios Compartidos was released as a single in 2016.

== Members ==
- David Gohe – vocals
- Rubén Rosas – rhythm guitar

== Discography ==
=== Studio albums ===
- Eterno (2014)
- Músicas para el fin del mundo (2018)
- Romanthica (2025)

=== Live albums ===
- MMXVII (Live) (2016)

=== Demos ===
- Al Final (2004)
- Regreso al Sur del Edén (2006)

=== Singles ===
- "Mercurio" (2013)
- "Labios Compartidos" (2016, Maná cover)
- "Recuerdos" (2017)
- "La Despedida" (2021)
- "Qué más da" (2023)

=== Eps ===
- Acusthica (2021)
