= Lovelorn (album) =

Studio album by Leaves' Eyes
- Released: 26 May 2004
- Recorded: Mastersound Studio, Fellbach/Stuttgart, Germany, 2003–2004
- Genre: Symphonic metal; gothic metal
- Length: 41:36
- Label: Napalm
- Producer: Alexander Krull

Leaves' Eyes chronology
Lovelorn (2004)	Elegy (2005)

Singles from Lovelorn
- 1. "Into Your Light" Released: 18 June 2004

Professional ratings
Review scores
Source	Rating
Sea of Tranquility	4/5 stars
Exclaim!	(favorable)
Metal Temple	8/10 stars

Lovelorn is the debut studio album by the Norwegian/German symphonic metal band Leaves' Eyes, released in 2004. All vocals are by Liv Kristine, except death growls, which are by Alexander Krull.

== Track listing ==
All lyrics are written by Liv Kristine; all music is composed by Alexander Krull, Chris Lukhaup, Thorsten Bauer, Mathias Röderer, and Martin Schmidt.

No.	Title	Length
1.	"Norwegian Lovesong"	3:43
2.	"Tale of the Sea Maid"	3:48
3.	"Ocean's Way"	3:32
4.	"Lovelorn"	4:11
5.	"The Dream"	4:59
6.	"Secret"	4:31
7.	"For Amelie"	3:38
8.	"Temptation"	3:44
9.	"Into Your Light"	5:33
10.	"Return to Life"	4:07
Total length:		41:36

== Personnel ==
=== Band members ===
- Liv Kristine – lead vocals, keyboards
- Alexander Krull – death growls, programming, keyboards
- Thorsten Bauer – guitars, keyboards
- Mathias Röderer – guitars, keyboards
- Christopher Lukhaup – bass, keyboards
- Martin Schmidt – drums, percussion, programming, keyboards

=== Guest musicians ===
- Carmen Elise Espenæs – backing vocals on track 9
- Timon Birkhofer – piano and cello on tracks 5 and 7

=== Production ===
- Alexander Krull – production, engineering, mixing, mastering
- Chris Lukhaup, Martin Schmidt, Mathias Röderer, Thorsten Bauer – assistant engineers
