= Elegy (EP) =

- Cover design by Stefan Heilemann

EP by Leaves' Eyes
- Released: 2 May 2005
- Recorded: Mastersound Studio, Fellbach/Stuttgart, Germany, 2005
- Genre: Symphonic metal
- Length: 25:01
- Label: Napalm
- Producer: Alexander Krull

Leaves' Eyes chronology
Lovelorn (2004)	Elegy (2005)	Vinland Saga (2005)

Elegy is a maxi-single/EP by symphonic metal band Leaves' Eyes, released on 2 May 2005. Almost all vocals are by the Norwegian singer Liv Kristine, with some backing "growls" by her husband Alexander Krull. The song "Elegy" is taken from the then upcoming album Vinland Saga, and a further track from that album, "Solemn Sea" is also included in demo form. The rest of the tracks are exclusive to this release, but unlike the following EP Legend Land, they do not share the Vinland theme.

== Track listing ==
All lyrics are written by Liv Kristine; all music is composed by Alexander Krull, Thorsten Bauer, Mathias Röderer & Christopher Lukhaup.

No.	Title	Length
1.	"Elegy" (single version)	4:33
2.	"Senses Capture"	4:58
3.	"A Winter's Poem"	4:06
4.	"Solemn Sea" (demo version)	3:47
5.	"Mot fjerne land" (Toward Faraway Lands)	2:28
6.	"Elegy" (album version)	5:06
Total length:		25:01

== Personnel ==
=== Leaves' Eyes ===
- Liv Kristine Espenæs Krull – female vocals
- Alexander Krull – keyboards, programming, death growls
- Thorsten Bauer – guitars
- Mathias Röderer – guitars
- Chris Lukhaup – bass
- Moritz Neuner – drums, percussion

=== Production ===
- Produced, engineered, mixed and mastered by Alexander Krull at Mastersound Studios
- Assistant recording engineers: Mathias Röderer, Thorsten Bauer, Chris Lukhaup, Robert Suß

== Charts ==
Chart (2005)	Peak position
German Singles Chart	76
