= Legend Land =

- Cover design by Stefan Heilemann

EP by Leaves' Eyes
- Released: June 2, 2006
- Recorded: Mastersound Studio, Fellbach/Stuttgart, Germany, 2005
- Genre: Symphonic metal
- Length: 21:08
- Language: English / Norwegian
- Label: Napalm
- Producer: Alexander Krull

Leaves' Eyes chronology
Vinland Saga (2005)	Legend Land (2006)	We Came with the Northern Winds: En Saga i Belgia (2009)

Professional ratings
Review scores
Source	Rating
About.com	3.5/5 stars
Blabbermouth.net	8/10 stars
Kerrang!	4/5 stars

Legend Land is an EP by the symphonic metal band Leaves' Eyes, released on June 2, 2006 as a follow-up to the album Vinland Saga. Almost all vocals are by Liv Kristine, but there are also some death growls in the tracks "Legend Land", "Viking's Word", and "The Crossing" provided by Alexander Krull.

== Track listing ==
All lyrics are written by Liv Kristine Espenæs Krull; all music is composed by Alexander Krull, Chris Lukhaup, Thorsten Bauer and Mathias Röderer.

No.	Title	Length
1.	"Legend Land"	3:43
2.	"Skraelings"	3:34
3.	"Viking's Word"	3:35
4.	"The Crossing"	3:18
5.	"Lyset" (The Light)	2:15
6.	"Legend Land" (extended version)	4:43
Total length:		21:08

== Personnel ==
=== Leaves' Eyes ===
- Liv Kristine Espenæs Krull - lead vocals, keyboards
- Alexander Krull - death grunts, keyboards, programming, samples
- Thorsten Bauer - guitars, keyboards
- Mathias Röderer - guitars, keyboards
- Christopher Lukhaup - bass, keyboards
- Moritz Neuner - drums, percussion, keyboards

=== Additional musicians ===
- Timon Birkhofer - cello
- Sarah Nuchel - violin

=== Production ===
- Produced, engineered, mixed and mastered by Alexander Krull at Mastersound Studios
- Assistant recording engineers: Mathias Röderer, Thorsten Bauer, Chris Lukhaup

== Charts ==
Chart (2006)	Peak position
German Singles Chart	75
