= The Last Viking (album) =

Studio album by Leaves' Eyes
- Released: 23 October 2020
- Studio: Mastersound, Stuttgart, Germany
- Genre: Symphonic metal
- Length: 63:48
- Label: AFM
- Producer: Alexander Krull

Leaves' Eyes chronology
Sign of the Dragonhead (2018)	The Last Viking (2020)	Myths of Fate (2024)

Singles from The Last Viking
- 1. "Dark Love Empress" Released: 17 August 2020; 2. "Chain of the Golden Horn" Released: 20 September 2020; 3. "Black Butterfly" Released: 29 October 2021

Professional ratings
Review scores
Source	Rating
Blabbermouth.net	7/10
Sonic Perspectives	8.9/10

The Last Viking is the eighth studio album by German symphonic metal band Leaves' Eyes. It was released on October 23, 2020, by AFM Records. It is the last album to feature longtime member Thorsten Bauer.

== Track listing ==
The Last Viking track listing
No.	Title	Length
1.	"Death of a King"	2:33
2.	"Chain of the Golden Horn"	4:00
3.	"Dark Love Empress"	4:43
4.	"Serpents and Dragons"	4:30
5.	"Black Butterfly" (featuring Clementine Delauney)	4:25
6.	"War of Kings"	4:18
7.	"For Victory"	3:58
8.	"Two Kings, One Realm"	2:39
9.	"Flames in the Sky"	4:48
10.	"Serkland"	4:19
11.	"Varangians"	3:55
12.	"Night of the Ravens"	4:35
13.	"The Last Viking"	10:04
14.	"Break into the Sky of Aeon"	5:01
Total length:		63:48

Notes

- The digipak, limited and artbook editions feature a second disc, containing the instrumental versions of the first disc.
- The limited and artbook editions of the album features a DVD of a documentary titled "Viking Spirit". A third disc is featured as the soundtrack for the documentary.

== Personnel ==
Leaves' Eyes

- Joris Nijenhuis – drums, Viking choir vocals, assistant engineer
- Thorsten Bauer – guitar, bass, mandolin, music, orchestral arrangements, Viking choir vocals, assistant engineer
- Micki Richter – guitar, Viking choir vocals, assistant engineer
- Alexander Krull – growled vocals, Viking choir vocals, music, lyrics, cover concept, recording, engineer, mixing, mastering, programming
- Elina Siirala – female vocals, choir vocals, Viking choir vocals

Additional musicians

- Christel Fichtner – choir vocals
- Full Moon Choir – choir vocals
- Uwe Fichtner – Viking choir vocals
- Thomas Roth – nyckelharpa
- Lea-Sophie Fischer – solo violin, fiddle
- Susanne Dahle Johansen – spoken words (1)
- Clementine Delauney – guest vocals (5)

Production

- Stefan Heilemann – artwork, cover concept, band photography
- Alex Schuller – assistant engineer
- Jonah Weingarten – songwriting (1)

== Charts ==
Chart (2020)	Peak position
German Albums (Offizielle Top 100)	28
Swiss Albums (Schweizer Hitparade)	62
UK Independent Albums (OCC)	48
UK Rock & Metal Albums (OCC)	26
