= Liv Kristine =

Norwegian singer (born 1976)

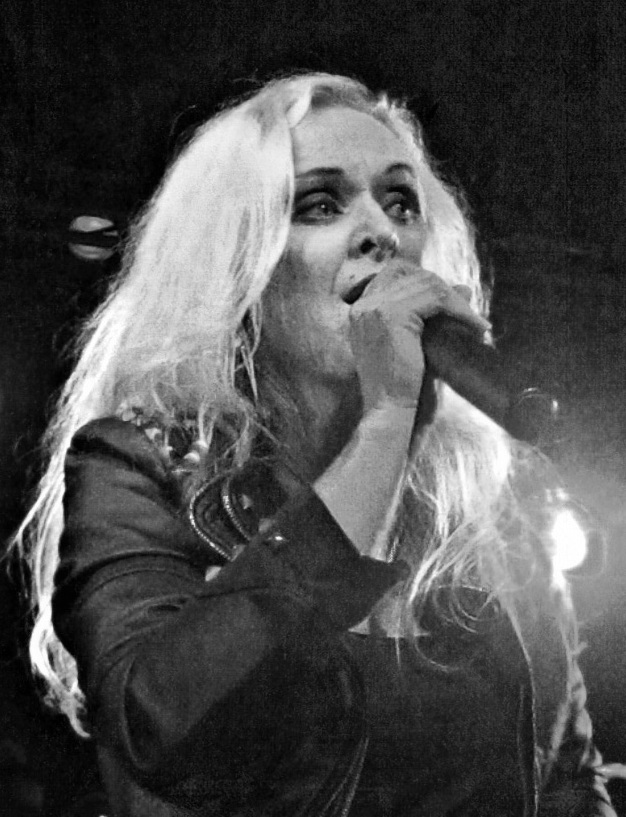
- Liv Kristine in 2014

Background information
- Born: Liv Kristine Espenæs; 14 February 1976 (age 50); Stavanger, Norway
- Genres: Symphonic metal; gothic metal; folk metal; pop rock
- Occupations: Singer; songwriter
- Years active: 1993–present
- Label: Metalville Records
- Member of: Liv Kristine
- Formerly of: Theatre of Tragedy; Leaves' Eyes
- Website: livkristine.net

Liv Kristine Espenæs (born 14 February 1976) is a Norwegian singer who has performed and composed songs mostly for various subgenres of heavy metal music. She started her career as a vocalist of gothic metal band Theatre of Tragedy, and is the former lead vocalist of symphonic metal band Leaves' Eyes. She is known for her work in close association with her then-husband and leader of German band Atrocity, Alexander Krull. She is vocalist in German band Midnattsol alongside her younger sister Carmen Elise Espenæs. She has also released a number of solo albums in various genres.

== Career ==
Liv Kristine was born in Stavanger, and joined Norwegian gothic metal band Theatre of Tragedy in 1994 as a backup singer, but was soon sharing lead vocals duties with Raymond István Rohonyi. She was fired from Theatre of Tragedy in 2003, a fact she learned about through an e-mail message. She had been living in Germany since 1996 and collaborating with death metal band Atrocity, whose singer Alexander Krull she married on 3 July 2003. With the five musicians from Atrocity she formed a new band, Leaves' Eyes, in August 2003.

She has also released six solo albums, the most recent of which was released in October 2025 through Napalm Records. The first, Deus Ex Machina, was released in 1998, and was re-released in 2024. She continued her pop-influenced solo career besides fronting Leaves' Eyes. In early 2006 she released her second solo album, Enter My Religion on Roadrunner Records.

Her fifth solo album Vervain was released in October 2014 and featured contributions by Doro Pesch and Michelle Darkness.

In 2005, Liv Kristine was nominated for a Grammy award with Cradle of Filth for the song "Nymphetamine".

She also performed live with Firewind on their 2014 tour. In 2016, she joined Eluveitie as a session vocalist for a couple of their live shows after the departure of their singer Anna Murphy.

On 16 April 2016, Leaves' Eyes stated that Liv Kristine, who formed and had the idea of the band project, was no longer the singer of the band.

In December 2017 it was announced that Liv Kristine joined her sister Carmen's band Midnattsol. She was originally announced to be a guest on their new album but after some discussions, the band picked her up as a permanent member.

In 2021, her solo album Have Courage Dear Heart was released, followed by River Of Diamonds (2023).

Her last material Amor Vincit Omnia is released in 2025 through Metalville Records.[24]

== Personal life ==
On 3 July 2003, Liv Kristine married Atrocity vocalist Alexander Krull. They have a son, Leon Alexander. Kristine and her husband split up in early January 2016. She married Michael Hansen (Espenæs) in June 2021. Kristine is a keen runner.

Her younger sister, Carmen Elise Espenæs, is the vocalist of the German symphonic/folk metal band Midnattsol and of the Norwegian gothic/folk metal band Savn.

After living in Switzerland for a few years and follow-up her solo career, she came back to Norway in 2025.

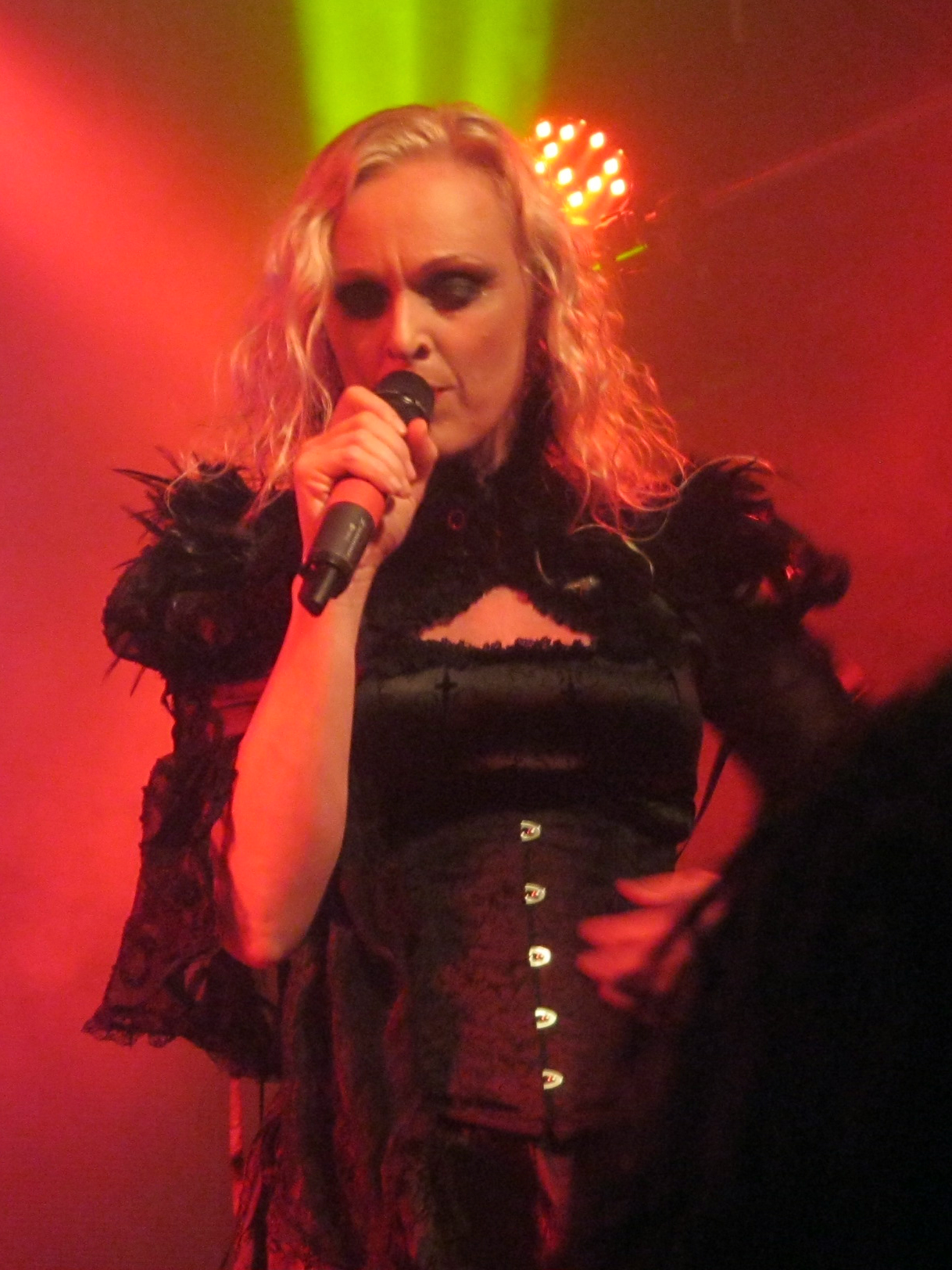
Kristine at a live show in Israel, 2016

Liv Kristine helped pioneer the contrasting operatic female vocals with male growls in symphonic metal. Paradise Lost and The Gathering had already made use of this technique on some songs from their earlier albums, but it was the Norwegian Theatre of Tragedy, Kristine's first band, that released an entire album devoted to this approach with their self-titled debut in 1995. Kristine has a soprano vocal range.

== Discography ==
=== Solo ===
Studio albums

- Deus Ex Machina (1998)
- Enter My Religion (2006)
- Skintight (2010)
- Libertine (2012)
- Vervain (2014)
- Have Courage Dear Heart (2021)
- River of Diamonds (2023)
- Amor Vincit Omnia (2025)

Singles

- 3AM (1998)
- Take Good Care (1998)
- One Love (1999)
- Fake a Smile (2006)
- Over the Moon (2006)
- Trapped in Your Labyrinth (2006)
- Skintight (2010)
- Paris Paris (2012)
- Love Decay (feat. Michelle Darkness) (2014)
- Skylight (2019)
- Gravity (2020)
- River of Diamonds (2023)
- In Your Blue Eyes (2023)
- Love Me High (2023)
- Portrait: Ei Tulle Med Øyne Blå (2024)
- Amor Vincit Omnia (2025)
- Ode to Life Pristine (2025)
- 12th February (2025)
- Lotus (Acoustic Version) (2025)

EPs

- Fake a Smile (2006)
- Have Courage Dear Heart (2021)

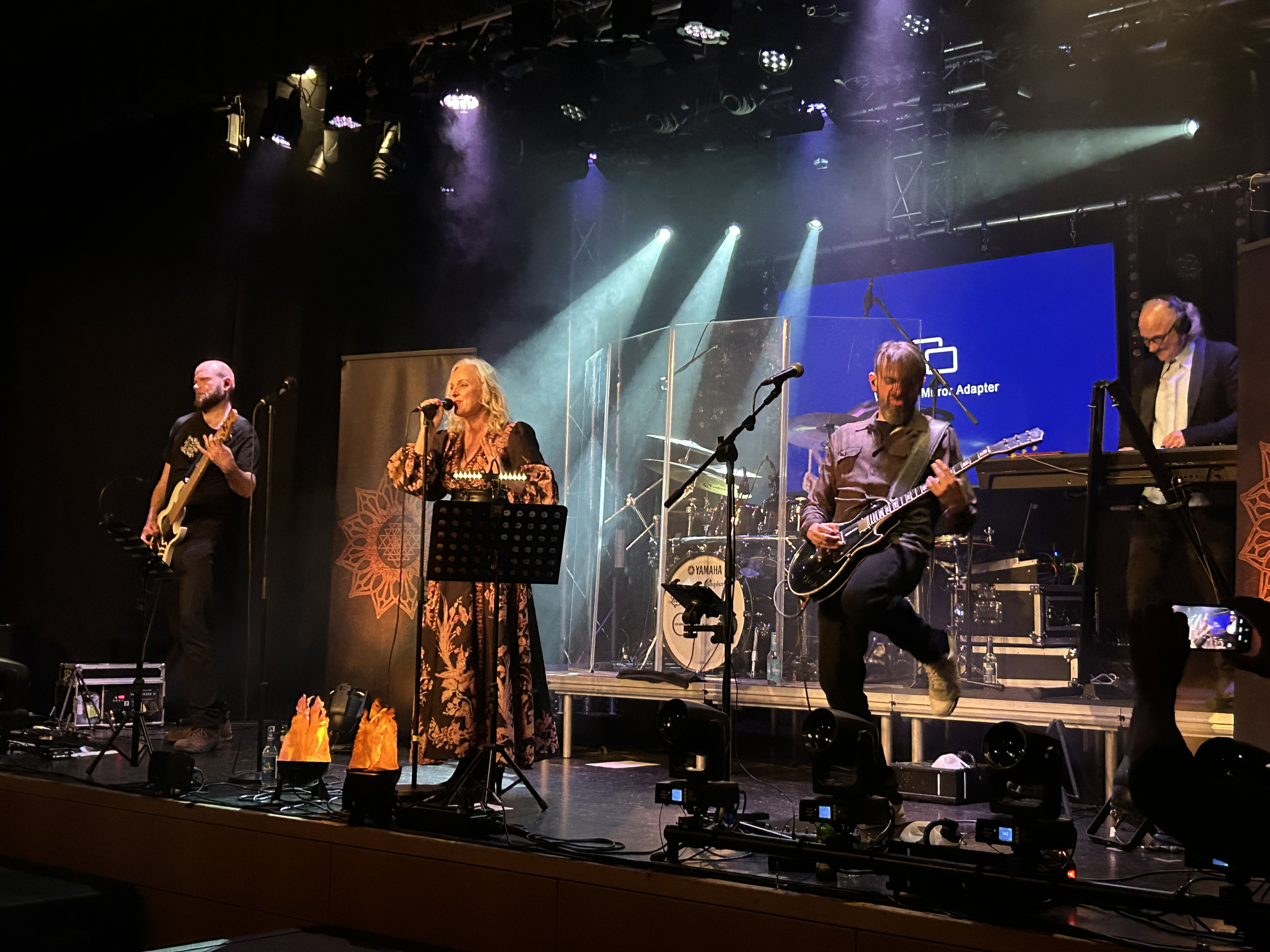
Liv Kristine performing in Nagold, 2025

Live albums

- Liv(e) in Nagold 2019 (2021)

=== With Midnattsol ===
Studio albums

- The Aftermath (2018)

=== With Leaves' Eyes ===
Studio albums

- Lovelorn (2004)
- Vinland Saga (2005)
- Njord (2009)
- Meredead (2011)
- Symphonies of the Night (2013)
- King of Kings (2015)

EPs

- Into Your Light (2004)
- Elegy (2005)
- Legend Land (2006)
- My Destiny (2009)
- At Heaven's End (2010)
- Melusine (2011)
- Song of Darkness (2026)

=== With Theatre of Tragedy ===
Studio albums

- Theatre of Tragedy (1995)
- Velvet Darkness They Fear (1996)
- Aégis (1998)
- Musique (2000)
- Assembly (2002)

EPs

- A Rose for the Dead (1997)
- Inperspective (2001)

Live albums

- Closure: Live (2001)

=== Guest appearances ===
- Atrocity – Werk 80 (1997) – (additional vocals)
- Heavenwood – Swallow (1998) – (vocals on "Downcast")
- Atrocity & Silke Bischoff – "Blue Moon" (non-album single) (1998) – (additional vocals)
- Atrocity – Non Plus Ultra (1999) – (additional vocals)
- WeltenBrand – Der Untergang von Trisona (1999) – vocals on "The Devil Gets the Profiteer"
- Das Ich – Re-Laborat (2000) – vocals on "Des Satans neue Kleider" (Atrocity Remix)
- Atrocity – Gemini (2000) – additional vocals
- Atrocity – Thank You – A Tribute to The Sisters of Mercy (2000) – vocals on "More"
- Genius – A Rock Opera Part II (2004) – vocals on "To Be Free"
- Immortal Rites – Art of Devolution (2004) – vocals on "Mirror Reflections"
- Hortus Animae – The Lotus Eaters – Dead Can Dance Tribute (2004) – vocals on "Summoning of the Muse"
- Cradle of Filth – Nymphetamine (2004) – vocals on "Nymphetamine"
- Atrocity – Atlantis (2004) – additional vocals
- Umbra et Imago – Motus Animi (2005) – "Ein letztes Mal" (Leaves' Eyes Remix)
- Delain – Lucidity (2006) – vocals on "See Me in Shadow" and "Day for Ghosts"
- Atrocity – Werk 80 II (2008) – additional vocals
- Doro Pesch – Fear No Evil (2009) – backing vocals on "Celebrate"
- Legio Mortis – The Human Creation and The Devil's Contribution (2011) – vocals on "Life Denied"
- Bob Katsionis – Rest in Keys (2012) – vocals on "Rendez-Vous in the Sky"
- Týr – Valkyrja (2013) – vocals on "The Lay of Our Love
- Romanthica – Eterno (2013) – vocals on "Despierta"
- Primal Fear – Delivering the Black (2014) – backing vocals on "Born with a Broken Heart"
- Savn – Savn (2014) – vocals on "I Am Free"
- Emerald Sun – Metal Dome (2015) – vocals on "Call of Nature"
- Tanzwut - Schreib es mit Blut (2016) – backing vocals on "Stille Wasser"
- Cradle of Filth – Cryptoriana – The Seductiveness of Decay (2017) – vocals on "Vengeful Spirit"
- Orden Ogan – Gunmen (2017) – vocals on "Come with Me to the Other Side"
- Lux in Tenebris – To a New Eternity (2018) – additional vocals on "The Grand Design"
- Ben Blutzukker – Queen of the Nite (2019) – additional vocals on "Queen of the Nite"
- Myrkgand – Old Mystical Tales (2019) – vocals on "Chthonian Cyclops"
- Coldbound – Slumber of Decay (2021) – vocals on "Slumber of Decay"
- Sollys - Soul Pristine (2021) - vocals on "Soul Pristine"
- Mortemia – The Pandemic Pandemonium Sessions (2021) – vocals on "Decadence Deepens Within"
- Tales of a Sleeping Giant (2022) – vocals on "Summer's End", "Lost in Emptiness", "Morgana"
- Sollys – Rhodonitt (2023) – vocals on "Rhodonitt"
- Don't Drop The Sword - Age of Heroes (2023) - vocals on 'A Murder of Ravens'
- Alexandrite - Cold Stars (2025) - vocals on "Cold Stars"
