= Leaves' Eyes =

German symphonic metal band

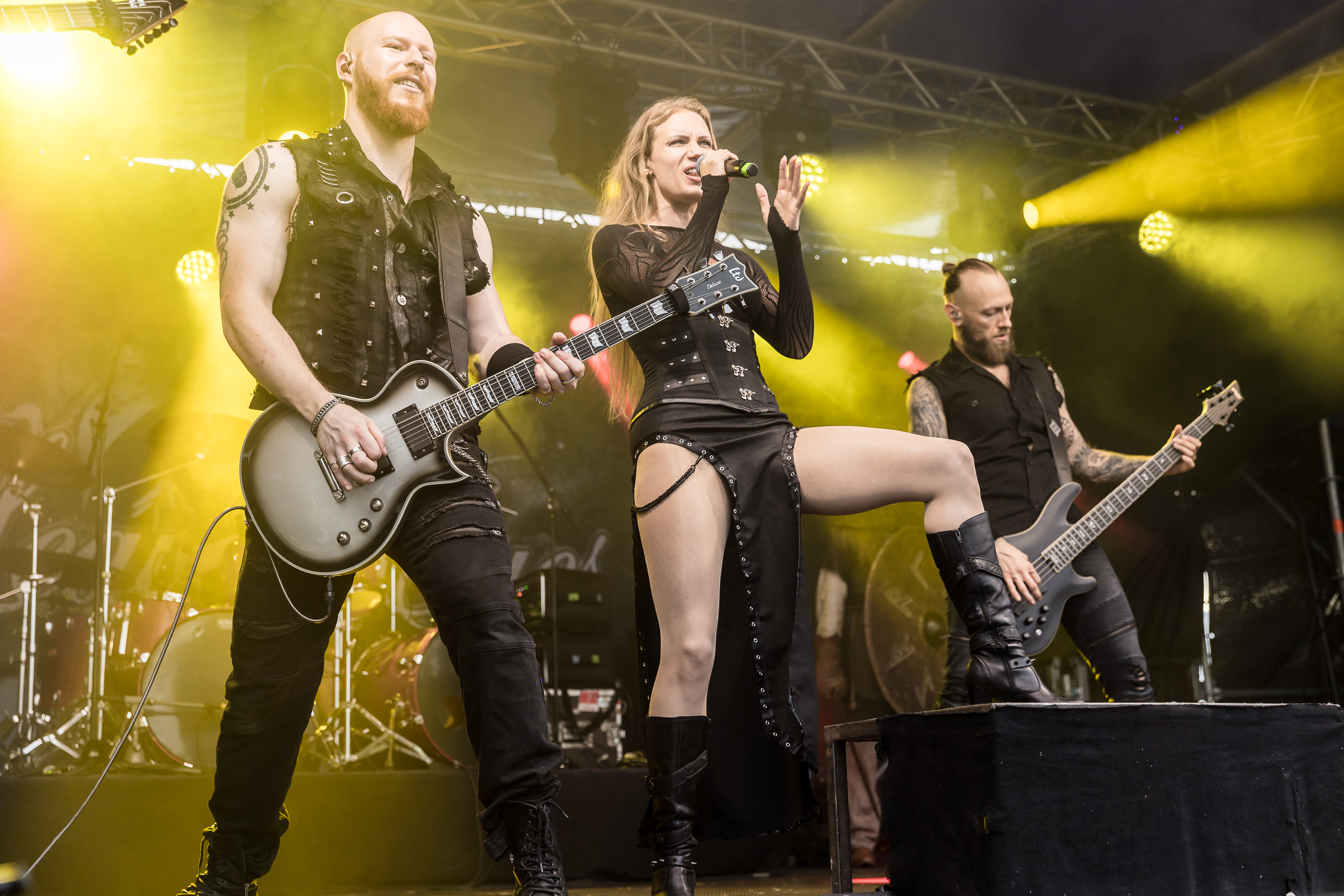
- Leaves' Eyes performing at Rock & Metal Day'z 2025

Background information
- Origin: Ludwigsburg, Germany
- Genres: Symphonic metal; gothic metal
- Years active: 2003–present
- Labels: Napalm; AFM
- Spinoff of: Theatre of Tragedy; Atrocity
- Members: Alexander Krull; Joris Nijenhuis; Elina Siirala; Andre Nasso; Luc Gebhardt; Florian Ewert
- Past members: Sander van der Meer; Mathias Röderer; Chris Lukhaup; Martin Schmidt; Nick Barker; Moritz Neuner; Alla Fedynitch; Seven Antonopoulos; Roland Navratil; J.B. van der Wal; Felix Born; Thorsten Bauer; Micki Richter; Liv Kristine
- Website: LeavesEyes.de

Leaves' Eyes is a symphonic metal band based in Germany, formed in 2003 by Liv Kristine (ex Theatre of Tragedy) and Alexander Krull (Atrocity). Kristine departed in 2016 and was succeeded by Elina Siirala. The band has released nine studio albums, a live album and DVD as well several singles and EPs.

== History ==
=== Formation and Lovelorn (2003–2005) ===
Liv Kristine performed with the band Theatre of Tragedy from its formation in 1993 and featured on first five albums by the band. She met Krull in the mid 1990s, and they married in 2003. The same year, they formed Leaves' Eyes after Kristine was dismissed from Theatre of Tragedy and enlisted members from Krull's band Atrocity.

Signed to Napalm Records, they began recording their debut album, Lovelorn. The concept behind the album was based upon a treatment written by Kristine during her literature studies. The album was preceded by the single "Into the Light" in April 2004. The band toured as support to Atrocity in Europe throughout the year, and appeared at the Summer Breeze and Wave Gotik Treffen festivals.

By the end of the year drummer Martin Schmidt had left both outfits, with Moritz Neuner hired as a replacement.

=== Vinland Saga and Njord (2005–2011) ===
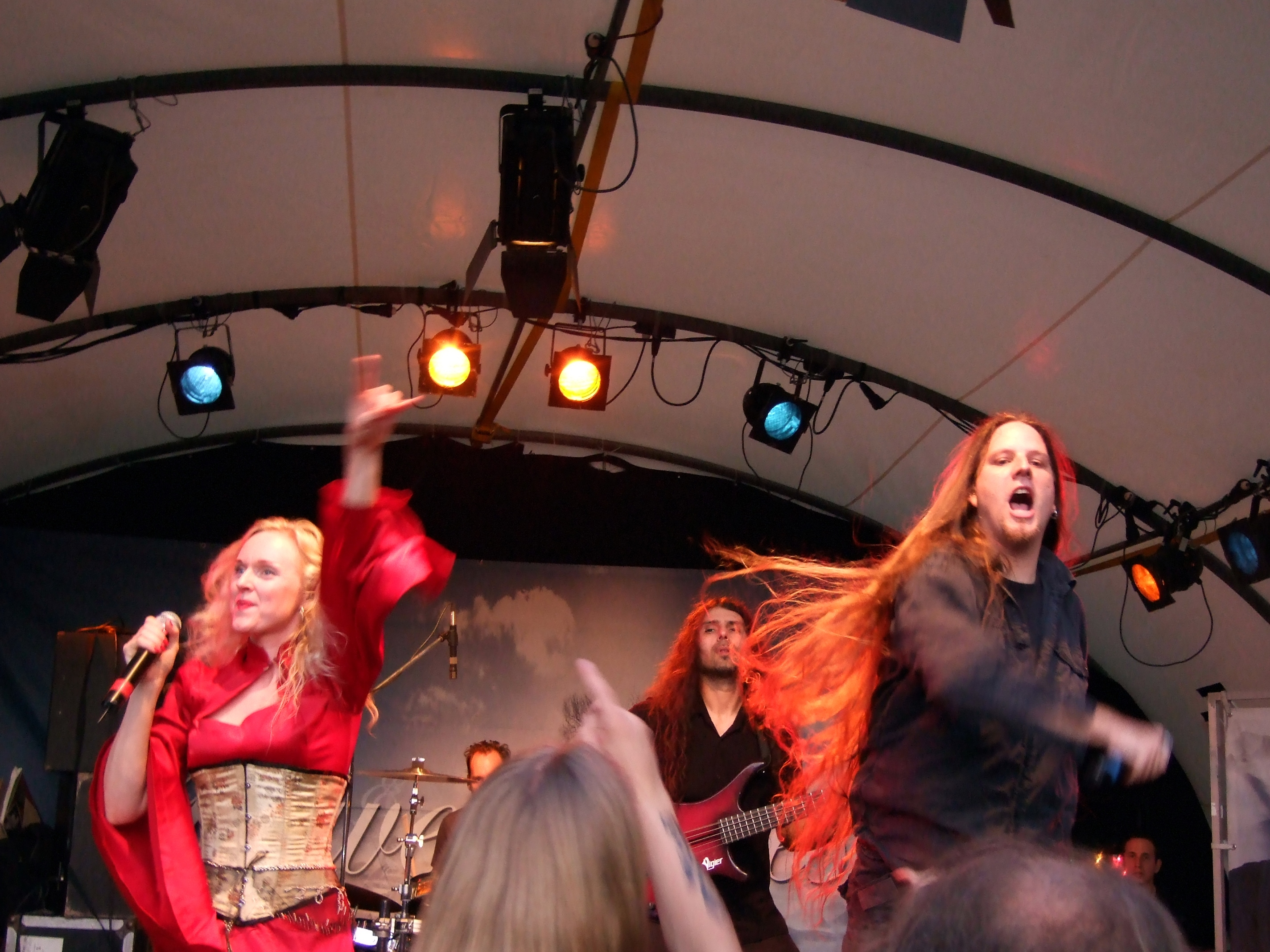
Liv Kristine and Alexander Krull, the band's founders

One year after Lovelorn, Leaves' Eyes released their follow-up album, Vinland Saga, in 2005, inspired by Viking explorer Leif Eriksson. The album's single, Elegy, charted in Germany for four consecutive weeks. The band continued to tour, mostly as support act, to for instance Subway To Sally and Paradise Lost.

The band embarked on their first tour of North America, which suffered some cancellations after an accident with their bus in Detroit. A companion EP Legend Land was released in July 2006, which charted in Germany. The band did a headlining tour around the UK and Northern Europe, and toured South America for the first time.

The band continued to tour in 2007, including North America as support to Kamelot. They also performed at several festivals, including the Metal Female Voices Festival, which was filmed.

By the end of the year it was announced that both Neuner and bassist Chris Lukhaup had left the band. Drummer Nick Barker joined the band for live dates during 2008, but left by the summer, with Alex Holzwarth as a temporary replacement.

In October 2008, Chris Antonopoulos joined the band on drums, while Alla Fedynitch was recruited on bass. As the band had been writing and recording their third album Njord for much of 2007, Fedynitch did not yet feature on the recordings. Instead, the main composer Thorsten Bauer contributed most to the songs.

In February 2009, the band released a 2 disc DVD featuring We Came with the Northern Winds tour documentary, as well as the 2007 En Saga i Belgia concert with a double live album. Released in July, the EP My Destiny charted in France. The album Njord appeared in August of that year, and was described as "a sweeping, epic album" with "many alluring charms". The album features the Lingua Mortis Orchestra conducted by Victor Smolski and a cover of the English folk ballad "Scarborough Fair".

The band toured in support of the album, while bassist Fedynitch was replaced by Oliver Holzwarth due to suffering an injury. She made her last appearance with the band during an acoustic set at the 2009 Metal Female Voices Festival, and was replaced by JB van der Wal a year later.

In January 2010, guitarist Mathias Röderer left the band, and was replaced by Sander van der Meer, while in March drummer Antonopoulos resigned. He was replaced by Roland Navratil, before the band toured as support Kamelot again around Europe and North America. In May 2010 the band released an expanded version of Njord that included the EP At Heaven's End.

=== Meredead and Symphonies of the Night (2011–2015) ===
After the personnel changes, the band began recording new material in the middle of 2010. In April 2011, Leaves' Eyes released their fourth studio album, Meredead. The record emphasised the 'varied folk elements' that featured on previous albums nad included a cover of "To France".

The 2011 EP Melusine was a special release in collaboration with the German magazine Sonic Seducer.

In an interview with Valkyrian Music, Leaves' Eyes announced they had begun writing material for their fifth studio album, which they aimed to release in spring 2013. On January 7, 2013, the band announced on their official Facebook page that the title of their fifth studio album would be Symphonies of the Night.

On May 9, 2013, the band announced that the vocal recordings were complete and that Alexander Krull had begun mixing the album. The band premiered the first new song from the album, titled "Hell to the Heavens," at the Summer Breeze Festival.

The artwork for the new album was released on August 26, 2013. A few days later, the band released a video announcing that they would be performing at Metal Female Voices Fest 2013. A teaser of the studio version of "Hell to the Heavens" was also included in the video.

=== King of Kings and departure of Liv Kristine (2015–2016) ===
Leaves' Eyes stated in 2015 that they would release a new album titled King of Kings, which would feature the London Voices choir and guest vocals by Simone Simons of Epica. This album would also be their first release on AFM Records after parting ways with their longtime label, Napalm Records. King of Kings is a concept album centered around the sagas of Norway's first king, Harald Fairhair (Harald Hårfagre).

In an interview with Sonic Cathedral webzine, Liv Kristine discussed her inspiration for the album:

The nicest thing for me is that it is said in the sagas that Harald became the first king of Norway after he won a battle that took place in one of the Norwegian fjords called Hafrsfjord. You know, that is a very important place—not only for the history of Norway—but also for me, because I was born there. So, this album is a concept album, but it's also a very personal album.

The first official video from King of Kings is for the track "The Waking Eye," which was filmed in Norway (for the background scenes) and in Germany (for the action scenes). The Viking reenactment group Værjaborg supplied over 40 members for the battle and action sequences. Leaves' Eyes considers "The Waking Eye" to be their most ambitious video to date.

On April 15, 2016, the band announced they had parted ways with lead vocalist and co-founder Liv Kristine. Since then, both parties have provided different accounts of how the split occurred, with the band stating that the decision regarding Kristine's departure was made in January. While the band initially stated that it had been a mutual decision, Kristine disputed this claim, indicating she was dismissed and that it was not her decision.

=== Arrival of Elina Siirala and Sign of the Dragonhead (2016–2019) ===
On April 15, 2016, the band announced Finnish singer Elina Siirala as their new lead vocalist. Siirala made her debut with the band on April 18, 2016, at the Hammersonic Festival in Jakarta. A tour edition of the album King of Kings was released on June 3, 2016.

On October 7, 2016, the band released the EP "Fires in the North," which featured a brand new song as well as three re-recorded tracks from King of Kings with Siirala on vocals. Following the release of the EP, the band embarked on a North American tour in support of Sabaton. On November 27, 2017, the band announced their new album, Sign of the Dragonhead. The same day the album was announced, the title track was released as the lead single. The song "Across the Sea" was released as the album's second single on December 31, 2017, with an accompanying music video. The band released "Jomsborg" as the album's third single on January 11, 2018.

Sign of the Dragonhead was released on January 12, 2018. The band toured throughout Europe in support of the album, and on August 30, 2018, they released the song "Riders on the Wind" as the album's fourth and final single. The music video for the song featured footage from the Sign of the Dragonhead tour. On September 7, 2018, a tour edition of Sign of the Dragonhead was released, which included the "Riders on the Wind" physical single.

=== The Last Viking, departure of Thorsten Bauer, Myths of Fate, and Song of Darkness EP (2020–present) ===
The Last Viking was released on October 23, 2020. The album continued the trend toward folk metal and historical lyrics. On May 23, 2021, the band announced the addition of bassist Andre Nasso. On December 29, 2021, it was announced that Thorsten Bauer would leave the band by the end of 2021.

On December 9, 2023, the band revealed the title of their ninth studio album, Myths of Fate, which was released on March 22, 2024. On June 20, 2024, it was announced that guitarist Micki Richter left both of Krull's bands. His replacement is Florian Ewert.

On December 12, 2025, the band revealed the title of their EP, Song of Darkness, scheduled for release on March 7, 2026. The band released the title track of the EP on the day of the announcement.

== Style ==
Most of Leaves' Eyes' lyrics, written by Liv Kristine until her departure in 2016, focus on Norse mythology and the Viking Age and have frequently incorporated naturalistic themes. This also features in the stage set-up. The melodic vocals of Liv Kristine and her successor, Elina Siirala, are occasionally complemented by death growl vocals from Krull.

== Band members ==
Current

- Alexander Krull – keyboards, unclean vocals (2003–present)
- Elina Siirala – lead vocals (2016–present)
- Luc Gebhardt – guitar (2022–present)
- Florian Ewert – guitar (2024–present)
- Dominik Prykiel – bass (2024–present)
- Simon Skrlec – drums (2025–present)

Live

- Oliver Holzwarth – bass (2009)
- Niels Löffler – bass (2011–2015)
- Gijs Coolen – bass (2015–2016)
- Ferry Duijsens – bass (2016–2020)
- Marek Šmerda – bass (2026–present)

Former

- Thorsten Bauer – guitars, bass (2003–2021)
- Liv Kristine Espenæs – lead vocals (2003–2016)
- Mathias Röderer – guitars (2003–2010)
- Chris Lukhaup – bass (2003–2007)
- Martin Schmidt – drums (2003–2004)
- Nick Barker – drums (2004–2008)
- Moritz Neuner – drums (2005–2007)
- Alla Fedynitch – bass (2007–2010)
- Seven Antonopoulos – drums (2008–2010)
- Sander van der Meer – guitars (2010–2015)
- J.B. van der Wal – bass (2010–2013)
- Roland Navratil – drums (2010–2012)
- Felix Born – drums (2012–2013)
- Pete Streit – guitar (2015–2019)
- Micki Richter – guitar (2019–2024)
- Andre Nasso – bass (2021–2024)
- Joris Nijenhuis – drums (2013–2025)

== Discography ==
=== Studio albums ===
Title	Album details	Peak chart positions					Sales		
Title	Album details	GER	SWI	BEL (FL)	BEL (WA)	US Heat	Sales		
Lovelorn	* Released: May 26, 2004	* Label: Napalm Records	* Formats: CD, digital download	—	—	—	—	—	
Vinland Saga	* Released: May 30, 2005	* Label: Napalm Records	* Formats: CD, digital download	62	—	—	—	—	
Njord	* Released: August 26, 2009	* Label: Napalm Records	* Formats: CD, digital download	30	88	58	82	—	* US: 2,200+
Meredead	* Released: April 22, 2011	* Label: Napalm Records	* Formats: CD, CD+DVD, digital download	32	—	97	—	37	* US: 990+
Symphonies of the Night	* Released: November 15, 2013	* Label: Napalm Records	* Formats: CD, LP, digital download	49	—	172	124	18	
King of Kings	* Released: September 11, 2015	* Label: AFM Records	* Formats: CD, LP, digital download	15	54	90	130	52	
Sign of the Dragonhead	* Released: January 12, 2018	* Label: AFM Records	* Formats: CD, LP, digital download	21	33	189	—	—	
The Last Viking	* Released: October 23, 2020	* Label: AFM Records	* Formats: CD, LP, digital download	28	62	—	—	—	
Myths of Fate	* Released: March 22, 2024	* Label: AFM Records	* Formats: CD, LP, digital download	—	—	—	—	—	
"—" denotes a recording that did not chart or was not released in that territory.

=== Live albums ===
Title	Album details	Peak chart positions		
Title	Album details	GER		
We Came with the Northern Winds: En Saga i Belgia	* Released: February 27, 2009	* Label: Napalm Records	* Formats: CD, DVD	75
"—" denotes a recording that did not chart or was not released in that territory.

=== EPs ===
Title	Album details						
Title	Album details	Into Your Light	* Released: August 3, 2004	—	* Label: Napalm Records	* Formats: CD, digital download	—
Elegy	* Released: May 2, 2005	76	* Label: Napalm Records	* Formats: CD, digital download	—		
Legend Land	* Released: June 9, 2006	75	* Label: Napalm Records	* Formats: CD	—		
My Destiny	* Released: July 24, 2009	—	* Label: Napalm Records	* Formats: CD, digital download	54		
At Heaven's End	* Released: April 9, 2010	—	* Label: Napalm Records	* Formats: CD, digital download	—		
Melusine	* Released: April 19, 2011	—	* Label: Napalm Records	* Formats: CD, digital download	—		
Fires in the North	* Released: October 8, 2016	—	* Label: AFM Records	* Formats: CD, digital download	—		
Black Butterfly	* Released: November 22, 2019	—	* Label: AFM Records	* Formats: CD, digital download	—		
"—" denotes a recording that did not chart or was not released in that territory.

=== Music videos ===
Year	Title	Directed	Album
2004	"Into Your Light"	—	Lovelorn
2005	"Elegy"	—	Vinland Saga
2006	"Legend Land"	—	Legend Land
2009	"My Destiny"	Patric Ullaeus	Njord
2010	"Take the Devil in Me"	Robert Suß	Njord
2011	"To France"	Patric Ullaeus	Meredead
2013	"Hell to the Heavens"	—	Symphonies of the Night
2015	"Symphony of the Night (feat. Maite Itoiz – Spanish Version)"	—	Symphonies of the Night
2015	"Halvdan the Black"	—	King of Kings
2015	"The Waking Eye"	Rainer Zipp Fraenzen	King of Kings
2016	"Edge of Steel"	Rainer Zipp Fränzen	King of Kings
