= Alexander Krull =

German musician (born 1970)

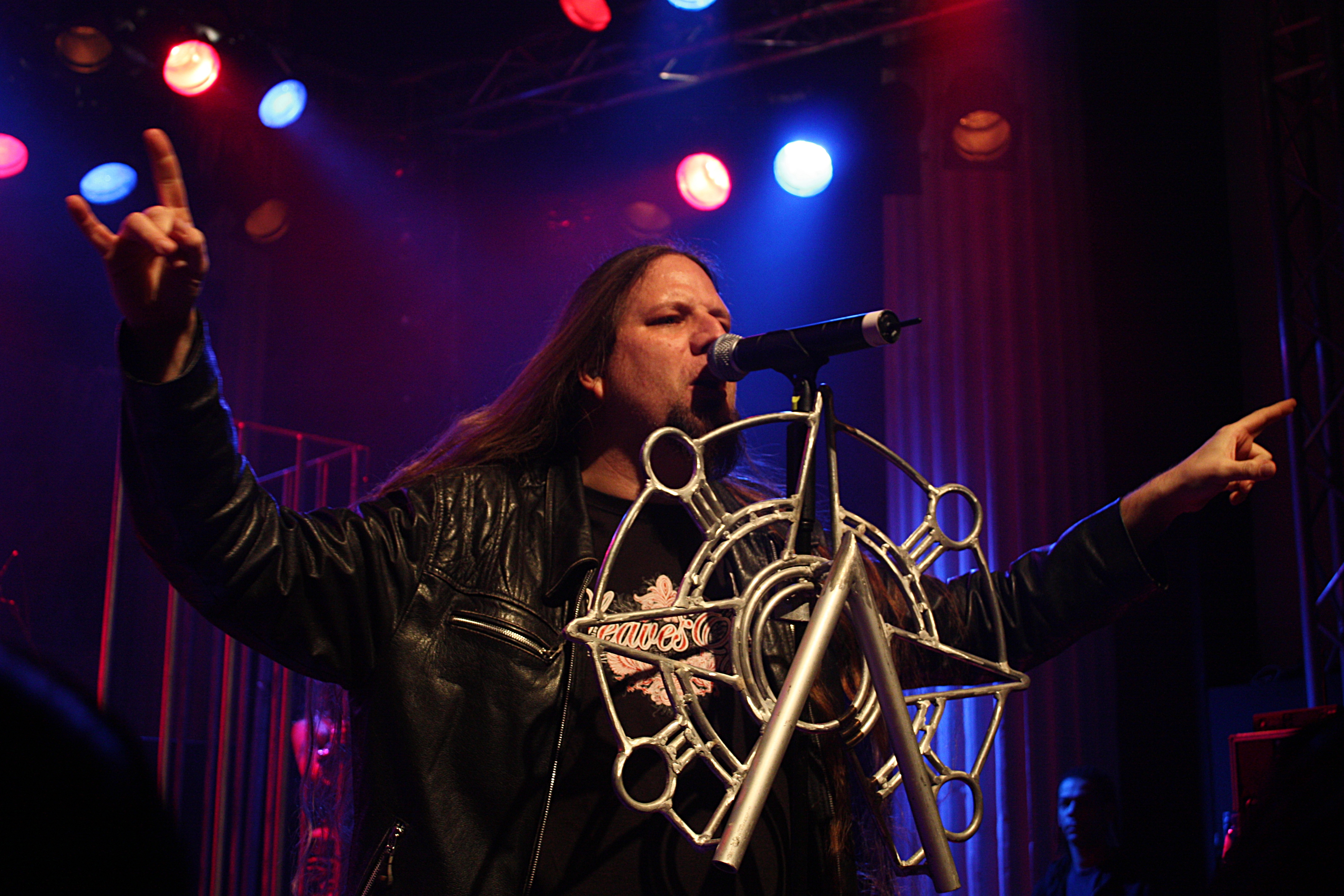
- Krull in 2009

Background information
- Also known as: Alex Krull, Krulle
- Born: 31 July 1970 (age 56); Ludwigsburg, West Germany
- Genres: Death metal, gothic metal, industrial metal
- Occupations: Musician, producer
- Instruments: Vocals, keyboards, programming
- Years active: 1985–present
- Member of: Leaves' Eyes, Atrocity
- Spouse: Liv Kristine (m. 2003–2016)
- Website: alexanderkrull.com

Alexander Krull (born 31 July 1970) is a German musician who is the lead vocalist for metal band Atrocity, as well as backing vocalist and keyboardist in the band Leaves' Eyes.

== Biography ==
Krull was born in Backnang, where he formed Atrocity in 1985. He has also worked as a producer for Elis, Leaves' Eyes, and Erben der Schöpfung. He uses the Mastersound Studio for his recording work with the bands. In 2005, he was named Producer of the Year by True Alternatives magazine.

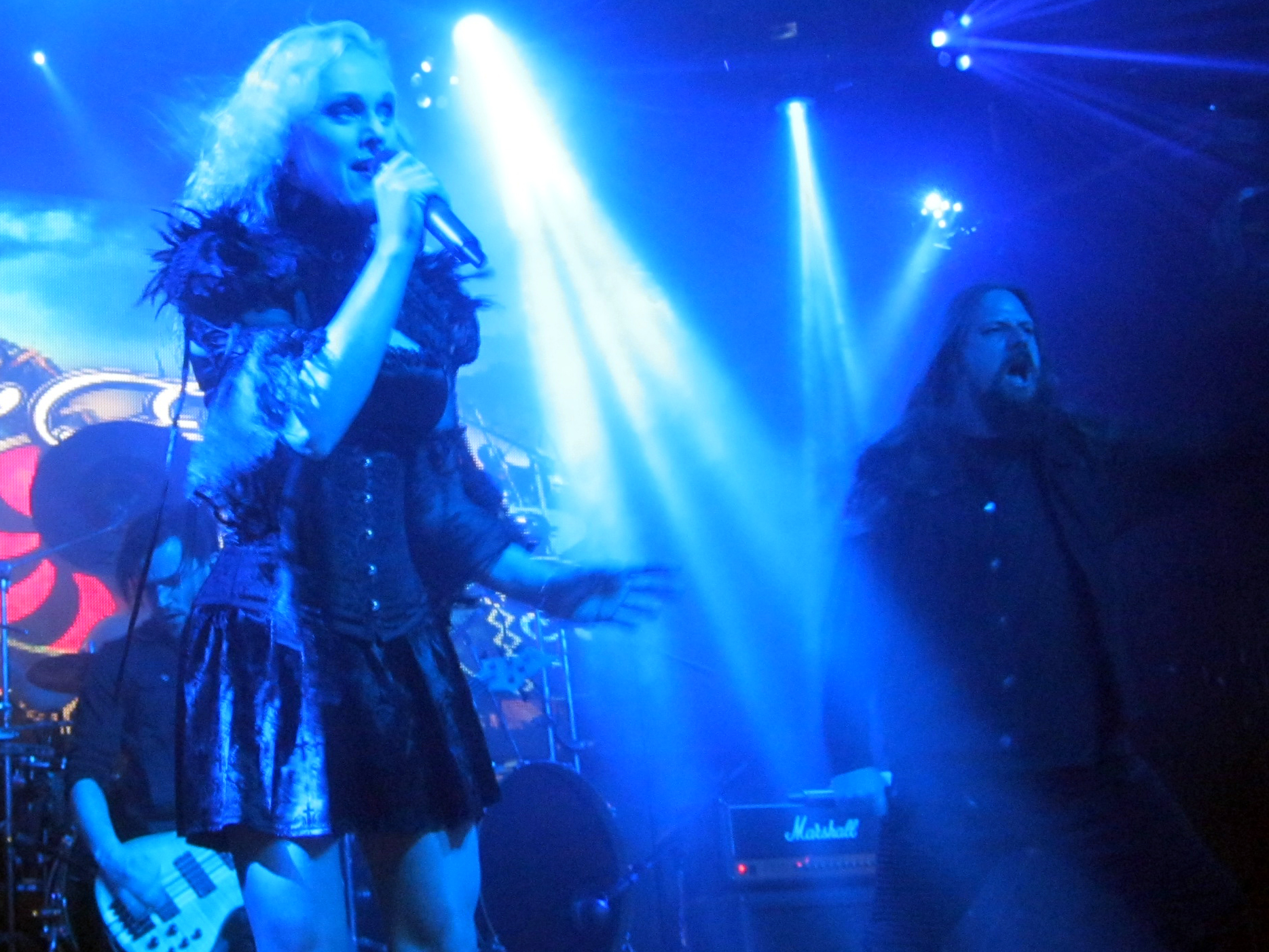
Liv Kristine and Krull during Leaves' Eyes show in Israel, 2016

Krull married Liv Kristine of Norwegian gothic metal band Theatre of Tragedy in July 2003. She gave birth to their first and only son the same year in December. The couple split in January 2016.

Krull's sister Yasmin has performed as guest singer with Atrocity on two projects and works as a Celtic folk singer.

== Discography ==
=== With Atrocity ===
- Hallucinations (1990)
- Todessehnsucht (1992)
- Blut (1994)
- Willenskraft (1996)
- Gemini (2000)
- Atlantis (2004)
- After the Storm (2010)
- Okkult (2013)

=== With Leaves' Eyes ===
- Into Your Light (Single, 2004)
- Lovelorn (2004)
- Elegy (Single, 2005)
- Vinland Saga (2005)
- Legend Land (EP, 2006)
- We Came with the Northern Winds: En Saga i Belgia (DVD-CD, 2009)
- My Destiny (EP, 2009)
- Njord (album) (2009)
- Melusine (EP, 2011)
- Meredead (2011)
- Symphonies of the Night (2013)
