= Koningslied =

Single by Various artists
- Released: April 19, 2013
- Genre: Nederpop
- Length: 5:07
- Label: Universal
- Songwriter: John Ewbank
- Producer: John Ewbank

The Koningslied (English: King's Song) is a song written for the investiture of prince Willem-Alexander as King of the Netherlands on 30 April 2013 on request of the Nationaal Comité Inhuldiging (National Committee [for the] Inauguration). Upon release the song was met with criticism and ridicule from the public. As a result of the criticism Ewbank withdrew the Koningslied on 20 April 2013. Nevertheless, the Nationaal Comité Inhuldiging confirmed on 22 April 2013 the song would be used as part of the investiture.

== Background, release and controversy ==
John Ewbank composed the music and wrote the lyrics using suggestions that were sent in during a participation project through Dutch social media and the official website of the inauguration. Artists who cooperated on writing the song are Ali B, Bollebof, Daphne Deckers, Fouradi, Lange Frans, Guus Meeuwis, Kraantje Pappie, Gers Pardoel, and Jack Poels.

The Koningslied was released on 19 April 2013. Soon after its release it reached the first position on the iTunes download chart. Both music and lyrics quickly became the subject of criticism and ridicule. The same day, an online petition against the song was started by journalist Sylvia Witteman and signed 20,000 times. It passed the 40,000 mark a few days later. Alternative King's Songs were released on YouTube soon after. As a result of the criticism Ewbank withdrew the Koningslied on 20 April 2013. The Nationaal Comité Inhuldiging confirmed on 22 April 2013 the song would be used as part of the investiture.

The song cost €550,000, which was paid by the broadcaster Nederlandse Publieke Omroep.

== Performance for King Willem-Alexander ==
The Nationaal Comité Inhuldiging originally intended that the song would be sung on 30 April 2013 for Willem-Alexander in one central place in all the provinces of the Netherlands and in each of the countries of the Netherlands Antilles. This did not happen because of a lack in interest in Maastricht and Assen. In Utrecht, no license was given for the event and in Zwolle the DJ forgot to play the song. The performance of the song in Rotterdam Ahoy by 33 of the participating artists was broadcast on two video screens in Amsterdam for Willem-Alexander and Máxima.

== Cooperating artists ==
- Willeke Alberti
- Ali B
- Jim Bakkum
- Frans Bauer
- Bollebof
- Marco Borsato
- Alain Clark
- Ben Cramer
- Esmée Denters
- Do
- Sharon Doorson
- Frans Duijts
- Edwin Evers
- Jennifer Ewbank
- Fouradi
- Danny Froger
- René Froger
- Jack van Gelder
- Niels Geusebroek
- Glennis Grace
- Wouter Hamel
- André Hazes jr.
- Roxeanne Hazes
- Ruben Hein
- Chris Hordijk
- Ruth Jacott
- Laura Jansen
- Chantal Janzen
- Gerard Joling
- Pearl Jozefzoon
- Jeroen van Koningsbrugge
- Carel Kraayenhof
- Iris Kroes
- Paul de Leeuw
- Lisa Lois
- Jamai Loman
- Guus Meeuwis
- Anita Meijer
- Lavinia Meijer
- Johnny de Mol
- Nielson
- Trijntje Oosterhuis
- No-P
- Kraantje Pappie
- Gers Pardoel
- Syb van der Ploeg
- Henk Poort
- Jaap Reesema
- Edsilia Rombley
- Rowwen Hèze
- Frederique Spigt
- Lee Towers
- Babette van Veen

Rob de Nijs withdrew after reading the song's lyrics.
