= Silkstone (disambiguation) =

Silkstone may refer to:

== Places ==
- Silkstone, Queensland, a suburb of Ipswich, Queensland, Australia
- Silkstone, a village in South Yorkshire, England

== Music ==
- Silkstone (group), Dutch pop band fronted by vocalist Niels Geusebroek

== Other ==
- Binghamite, which also goes by the name silkstone
- The Silkstone Waggonway, an early British railway
