= The Voice of Holland season 2 =

The Voice of Holland
- Season 2
- Hosted by: Martijn Krabbé; Wendy van Dijk; Winston Gerschtanowitz (Red Room/Backstage); Airen Tjon-A-Tsien (V Reporter)
- Coaches: Angela Groothuizen; Nick & Simon; Roel van Velzen; Marco Borsato
- Winner: Iris Kroes
- Winning coach: Marco Borsato
- Runner-up: Chris Hordijk
- Finals venue: Studio 24 in Hilversum

Release
- Original network: RTL 4
- Original release: 23 September 2011 – 20 January 2012

Season chronology
- ← Previous; Season 1 Next → Season 3

The Voice of Holland (season 2) was the second season of the Dutch reality singing competition, created by media tycoon John de Mol Jr. and the first sophomore season ever of the show's format. It was aired from September 2011 to January 2012 on RTL 4.

One of the important premises of the show is the quality of the singing talent. Four coaches, themselves popular performing artists, train the talents in their group and occasionally perform with them. Talents are selected in blind auditions, where the coaches cannot see, but only hear the auditioner.

Martijn Krabbé, who was hosting season one, remained as the host but was now joint by Wendy van Dijk, with whom he was already sharing the hosting duties on (Idols. Winston Gerschtanowitz was interviewing the contestants and their inmates backstage while Airen Tjon-A-Tsien was the V-Reporter (social media correspondent) on this edition.

Angela Groothuizen, Nick & Simon and Roel van Velzen returned as coaches for their second season. Jeroen van der Boom left the show, being replaced by popular Dutch pop-artist Marco Borsato who would eventually win the show with 19-year-old Iris Kroes on 20 January 2012 over Chris Hordijk for Team Nick & Simon, who again became the runners-up of the show. Kroes won over Hordijk with only 51% of the votes, making her the second female contestant worldwide to win the show after Steliyana Khristova, who won the Bulgarian version of the show.

== Summary of competitors ==
Competitors' table
– Winner
– Runner-up
– Third
– Fourth
– Eliminated after semi-finals
– Eliminated after quarter finals
– Eliminated in earlier live shows
– Eliminated in Sing-Off
– Eliminated in The Battle

Coaches	Top 64			
Marco Borsato				
Marco Borsato	Iris Kroes	Sharon Doorson	Bart Brandjes	Marieke Dollekamp
Marco Borsato	Nora Dalal	Ivanildo Kembel	Christiana Bohorquez	Luca Savazzi
Marco Borsato	Miguel van Dillenburg	Frank Geisink	Jan Hendrik Niemeijer	Dominique Eissing
Marco Borsato	Vera de Bree	Ricardo Kolleman	Joyce Aarsman	Stanley van der Brugh
Angela Groothuizen				
Angela Groothuizen	Erwin Nyhoff	Niels Geusebroek	Laura Estévez	Rodney Elzer
Angela Groothuizen	Daniël van der Zee	Gino Emnes	Fenneke Pommer	Lennie van Zandwijk
Angela Groothuizen	Jenny van de Wateringen	Demi Maténáhoru	Soumia Abalhaja	Carmen de Vries
Angela Groothuizen	Erwin Lima	Lara Mallo	Milan Kin	Kimberly Fransens
Nick & Simon				
Nick & Simon	Chris Hordijk	Charly Luske	Marloes van Ommen	Danjil Tuhumena
Nick & Simon	Emmanuel Anning	Jomy Boky	Maria Goosen	Jody Berghuis
Nick & Simon	Shannon Sarracco	Sakina Dalal	Gamze Zeriner	Daan Meijer
Nick & Simon	Jeevan Chopra	Laurie Reijs	Tom Wesselink	Stephanie Paulino
VanVelzen				
VanVelzen	Paul Turner	Wouter Vink	Michelle Flemming	Guy Barzily
VanVelzen	Sacha van Beek	Christopher Max	Mirjam van der Loo	Puck Cyson
VanVelzen	Elles Springs	Gianna Tam	Joyce Bloemers	Anuschka Westmaas
VanVelzen	Loisa Jade Christensen	Chara-Z Msellek	Lauren Wisman	Ben Littlewood

== The Blind Auditions ==
=== Episode 1 ===
Legenda	✔Coach pressed "I WANT YOU" button	Artist defaulted to this coach's team	Artist elected to join this coach's team

Order	Artist, age	Song	Coach's and contestant's choices			
Order	Artist, age	Song	Marco	Angela	Nick & Simon	Roel
1	Chaira Borderslee, 36	"Song for You"	—	—	—	—
2	Marieke Dollekamp, 21	"Modern World"	✔	✔	✔	✔
3	Milan Kin, 18	"Come Undone"	—	✔	—	—
4	Charly Luske, 33	"It's a Man's World"	✔	✔	✔	✔
5	Noam Vazana, 28	"Sweet About Me"	—	—	—	—
6	Ivanildo Kembel, 34	"7 Nation Army"	✔	—	✔	—
7	Kim van Doremalen, 19	"Sweet Goodbyes"	—	—	—	—
8	Laura Estévez, 29	"Love Is a Losing Game"	—	✔	✔	✔
9	Jos Severens, 27	"Because of You"	—	—	—	—
10	Lennie van Zandwijk, 17	"Price Tag"	✔	✔	✔	✔
11	Sakina Dalal, 23	"Hou Me Vast"	—	—	✔	—
12	Nora Dalal, 30	"Afscheid"	✔	—	—	—
13	Guy Barzily, 31	"True Colors"	✔	✔	✔	✔

=== Episode 2 ===
Order	Artist, age	Song	Coach's and contestant's choices			
Order	Artist, age	Song	Marco	Angela	Nick & Simon	Roel
1	Chris Hordijk, 28	"Waiting On The World To Change"	✔	✔	✔	—
2	Anuschka Westmaas, 34	"Away From You"	—	—	—	✔
3	Ace Vincent, 43	"It's a Man's World"	—	—	—	—
4	Demi Matenahoru, 17	"Valerie"	—	✔	—	—
5	Steffie Roelofs, 18	"World of Hurt"	—	—	—	—
6	Daan Meijer, 19	"I Alone"	—	—	✔	—
7	Joyce Aarsman, 22	"Michel"	✔	—	✔	—
8	Elles Springs, 35	"Summer of '69"	—	—	—	—
9	Christiana Bohorquez, 21	"Don't Know Why"	✔	✔	✔	✔
10	Guido van de Meent, 30	"Une Belle Histoire"	—	—	—	—
11	Rodney Elzer, 21	"Faith"	—	✔	✔	✔
12	Alice Hoes, 26	"Set Fire to the Rain"	—	—	—	—
13	Christopher Max, 49	"Come As You Are"	—	—	✔	✔
14	Iris Kroes, 18	"Someone Like You"	✔	✔	✔	✔

=== Episode 3 ===
Order	Artist, age	Song	Coach's and contestant's choices			
Order	Artist, age	Song	Marco	Angela	Nick & Simon	Roel
1	Jody Berghuis, 19	"I Was Made for Lovin' You"	✔	✔	✔	✔
2	Enlery Mayfield, 25	"Another Day"	—	—	—	—
3	Danjil Tuhumena, 37	"Waiting On The World To Change"	✔	—	✔	✔
4	Jenny van de Wateringen, 33	"I Alone"	✔	✔	✔	✔
5	Chahra-Z Msellek, 27	"Make You Feel My Love"	✔	—	—	✔
6	Luca Savazzi, 35	"Faith"	✔	—	—	—
7	Natalie Edwardes, 33	"Stil In Mij"	—	—	—	—
8	Erwin Nyhoff, 38	"The River"	✔	✔	✔	✔
9	Joyce Bloemers, 25	"Modern World"	✔	✔	✔	✔
10	Rodney Druivendal, 29	"Never Nooit Meer"	—	—	—	—
11	Jeevan Chopra, 21	"I Still Haven't Found"	—	—	✔	—
12	Paul Turner, 25	"Valerie"	—	—	✔	✔
13	Bridget van Alphen, 18	"Don't Know Why"	—	—	—	—
14	Sharon Doorson, 24	"It's a Man's World"	✔	✔	✔	✔

=== Episode 4 ===
Order	Artist, age	Song	Coach's and contestant's choices			
Order	Artist, age	Song	Marco	Angela	Nick & Simon	Roel
1	Ariën Vink, 36	"Harder Dan Ik Hebben Kan"	—	—	—	—
2	Wouter Vink, 28	"I Still Haven't Found What I'm Looking For"	—	✔	—	✔
3	Sacha van Beek, 26	"My Baby Left Me"	—	—	✔	✔
4	Bryan B., 43	"When Summer Ends"	—	—	—	—
5	Mirjam van der Loo, 33	"Times Are Changing"	—	—	✔	✔
6	Tom Wesselink, 25	"Margherita"	—	—	✔	—
7	Gino Politi, 53	"Storie Di Tutti I Giorni"	—	—	—	—
8	Marloes van Ommen, 22	"When You Believe"	✔	—	✔	—
9	Niels Geusebroek, 31	"Trouble"	—	✔	—	✔
10	Micheal Hijlkema, 23	"The Lazy Song"	—	—	—	—
11	Maria Goosen, 33	"World of Hurt"	—	—	✔	—
12	Lara Mallo, 22	"Sunday Morning"	—	✔	—	—
13	Aditya Elman, 23	"My Baby Left Me"	—	—	—	—
14	Stanley van der Brugh, 22	"Hallelujah I Just Love Her So"	✔	✔	✔	✔

=== Episode 5 ===
Order	Artist, age	Song	Coach's and contestant's choices			
Order	Artist, age	Song	Marco	Angela	Nick & Simon	Roel
1	Daniel van der Zee, 38	"Ordinary People"	✔	✔	✔	—
2	Gianna Tam, 24	"Valerie"	—	✔	✔	✔
3	Bart Brandjes, 49	"Holding Back The Years"	✔	—	✔	✔
4	Anke de Vries, 17	"Seven Nation Army"	—	—	—	—
5	Fenneke Pommer, 22	"Toen Ik Je Zag"	—	✔	—	—
6	Stephanie Paulino, 20	"Anything For You"	—	—	✔	—
7	Djino Snijtsheuvel, 31	"Iris"	—	—	—	—
8	Ben Littlewood, 42	"Time After Time"	✔	✔	✔	✔
9	Vera de Bree, 29	"Beautiful"	✔	—	—	—
10	Jan Hendrik Niemeijer, 23	"Pianoman"	✔	—	—	—
11	J.C. Wardenaar, 27	"How You Remind Me"	—	—	—	—
12	Puck Cyson, 33	"Blow Me Away"	✔	—	—	✔
13	Ivar Keuren, 28	"Maybe"	—	—	—	—
14	Laurie Reijs, 31	"Time After Time"	—	—	✔	✔
15	Michelle Flemming, 23	"It's a Man's World"	✔	✔	✔	✔

=== Episode 6 ===
Order	Artist, age	Song	Coach's and contestant's choices			
Order	Artist, age	Song	Marco	Angela	Nick & Simon	Roel
1	Shannon Sarracco, 25	"Another Day"	✔	✔	✔	—
2	Dominique Eissing, 24	"7 Nation Army"	✔	—	✔	—
3	Denise Wijngaarden, 49	"Natural Woman"	—	—	—	—
4	Gino Emnes, 35	"Easy"	—	✔	—	—
5	Carmen de Vries, 24	"Ordinary People"	✔	✔	✔	✔
6	Frank Geisink, 21	"Pak Maar M'n Hand"	✔	—	—	—
7	Rudi Sibma, 25	"Everything I Do"	—	—	—	—
8	Loisa Jade Christensen, 23	"Bottles"	✔	—	✔	✔
9	Pien Ankerman, 42	"Fragile"	—	—	—	—
10	Emmanuel Anning, 32	"7 Nation Army"	✔	—	✔	—
11	Gamze Zeriner, 26	"Natural Woman"	—	—	✔	—
12	Ricardo Kolleman,	"Here Without You"	✔	—	✔	✔
13	Erwin Lima, 28	"I'm Yours"	—	✔	—	—
14	Lauren Wisman,	"Don't Know Why"	—	—	—	✔

=== Wildcard ===
Order	Artist, age	Song	Coach's and contestant's choices			
Order	Artist, age	Song	Marco	Angela	Nick & Simon	Roel
1	Bo Jeuken, 27	"Valerie"	—	—	—	—
2	Jomy Boky, 31	"Three Days in a Row"	—	—	✔	—
3	Soumia Abalhaja, 23	"Someone Like You"	—	✔		—
4	Miguel van Dillenburg, 25	"Ordinary People"	✔	—		—
5	Kyara Kuiper, 19	"Michel"		—		—
6	Elles Springs, 35	"Sweet Child of Mine"		✔		✔
7	Kimberly Fransens, 19	"Someone Like You"		✔		
8	Julia Verbeek, 20	"7 Nation Army"		—		

== The Battle ==
=== Advisors ===
Marco Borsato	Angela Groothuizen	Nick & Simon	Roel van Velzen
Ton Dijkman	Sven Figee	Gordon Groothedde	Holger Schwedt

– Battle Winner
- Battle Loser

Week/Order	Coach	Winner	Loser	Song
1.1	Roel van Velzen	Christopher Max	Joyce Bloemers	"Sweet Child O' Mine"
1.2	Nick & Simon	Jody Berghuis	Stephanie Paulino	"Hot N Cold"
1.3	Roel van Velzen	Michelle Flemming	Anuschka Westmaas	"Love Is a Battlefield"
1.4	Marco Borsato	Christiana Bohorquez	Frank Geisink	"Love Song"
1.5	Angela Groothuizen	Niels Geusebroek	Jenny van de Wateringen	"Sex on Fire"
1.6	Marco Borsato	Bart Brandjes	Dominique Eissing	"When a Man Loves a Woman"
1.7	Angela Groothuizen	Lennie van Zandwijk	Demi Maténáhoru	"Nobody's Perfect"
1.8	Nick & Simon	Charly Luske	Tom Wesselink	"For The First Time"
2.1	Angela Groothuizen	Laura Estévez	Soumia Abalhaja	"Sweet Child O' Mine"
2.2	Nick & Simon	Emmanuel Anning	Laurie Reijs	"Face In The Crowd"
2.3	Marco Borsato	Iris Kroes	Miguel van Dillenburg	"Set Fire to the Rain"
2.4	Nick & Simon	Danjil Tuhumena	Jeevan Chopra	"Father and Friend"
2.5	Angela Groothuizen	Erwin Nyhoff	Carmen de Vries	"Dancing in the Dark"
2.6	Nick & Simon	Jomy Boky	Daan Meijer	"She's So High"
2.7	Angela Groothuizen	Gino Emnes	Erwin Lima	"Feeling Good"
2.8	Nick & Simon	Marloes van Ommen	Gamze Zeriner	"F**kin' Perfect"
2.9	Roel van Velzen	Paul Turner	Gianna Tam	"Animal"
3.1	Marco Borsato	Nora Dalal	Vera de Bree	"Mercy"
3.2	Angela Groothuizen	Rodney Elzer	Lara Mallo	"The Man Who Can't Be Moved"
3.3	Roel van Velzen	Mirjam van der Loo	Elles Springs	"Like The Way I Do"
3.4	Angela Groothuizen	Fenneke Pommer	Milan Kin	"Broken Strings"
3.5	Nick & Simon	Chris Hordijk	Sakina Dalal	"Not Over You"
3.6	Nick & Simon	Maria Goosen	Shannon Sarracco	"Wonderful World"
3.7	Angela Groothuizen	Daniel van der Zee	Kimberly Fransens	"This Love"
4.1	Marco Borsato	Sharon Doorson	Jan Hendrik Niemeijer	"One"
4.2	Roel van Velzen	Wouter Vink	Loisa Jade Christensen	"Against All Odds"
4.3	Roel van Velzen	Puck Cyson	Chara-Z Msellek	"I Wanna Be The Only One"
4.4	Marco Borsato	Marieke Dollekamp	Ricardo Kolleman	"Every Time I Think of You"
4.5	Roel van Velzen	Sacha van Beek	Lauren Wisman	"It Ain't Over 'Til It's Over"
4.6	Marco Borsato	Ivanildo Kembel	Joyce Aarsman	"You Give Me Something"
4.7	Marco Borsato	Luca Savazzi	Stanley van der Brugh	"Moves Like Jagger"
4.8	Roel van Velzen	Guy Barzily	Ben Littlewood	"Somewhere Only We Know"

=== The Sing Off ===
Sing Off #	Coach	Artist	Song
Sing Off 1	Nick & Simon	Danjil Tuhumena	"Waiting On The World To Change"
Sing Off 1	Nick & Simon	Jody Berghuis	"I Was Made for Lovin' You"
Sing Off 1	Nick & Simon	Maria Goosen	"World of Hurt"
Sing Off 2	Angela Groothuizen	Daniël van der Zee	"Ordinary People"
Sing Off 2	Angela Groothuizen	Fenneke Pommer	"Toen Ik Je Zag"
Sing Off 2	Angela Groothuizen	Lennie van Zandwijk	"Price Tag"
Sing Off 3	Marco Borsato	Christiana Bohorquez	"Don't Know Why"
Sing Off 3	Marco Borsato	Ivanildo Kembel	"7 Nation Army"
Sing Off 3	Marco Borsato	Luca Savazzi	"Faith"
Sing Off 4	Roel van Velzen	Puck Cyson	"Blow Me Away"
Sing Off 4	Roel van Velzen	Mirjam van der Loo	"Times Are Changing"
Sing Off 4	Roel van Velzen	Guy Barzily	"True Colors"

== Live shows ==
=== Liveshow 1 ===
Competition performances

Order	Coach	Artist	Song	Result
1	Nick & Simon	Emmanuel Anning	"Rolling in the Deep"	Eliminated
2	Angela Groothuizen	Daniël van der Zee	"Promise Me"	Eliminated
3	Nick & Simon	Danjil Tuhumena	"Another Day"	Safe
4	Angela Groothuizen	Erwin Nyhoff	"Go Your Own Way"	Safe
5	Nick & Simon	Marloes van Ommen	"Listen"	The Sing Off
6	Angela Groothuizen	Gino Emnes	"I Still Haven't Found What I'm Looking For"	Eliminated
7	Nick & Simon	Jomy Boky	"I'll Be There"	Eliminated
8	Angela Groothuizen	Laura Estévez	"Mama Do"	The Sing Off
9	Nick & Simon	Chris Hordijk	"Drops of Jupiter (Tell Me)"	Safe
10	Angela Groothuizen	Rodney Elzer	"Mandy"	Safe
11	Nick & Simon	Charly Luske	"Have a Little Faith in Me"	Safe
12	Angela Groothuizen	Niels Geusebroek	"Here Without You"	Safe

Non-competition performances

Order	Performers	Song
1	Lenny Kravitz, Jomy Boky & Laura Estévez	"Are You Gonna Go My Way"
2	Nick & Simon & their team	"Somebody to Love"

=== Liveshow 2 ===
Competition performances

Order	Coach	Artist	Song	Result
1	Marco Borsato	Sharon Doorson	"Ain't No Other Man"	The Sing Off
2	Roel van Velzen	Christopher Max	"Kiss From A Rose"	Eliminated
3	Marco Borsato	Iris Kroes	"Foolish Games"	Safe
4	Roel van Velzen	Guy Barzily	"Saving All My Love For You"	Safe
5	Marco Borsato	Ivanildo Kembel	"Perfectly Lonely"	Eliminated
6	Roel van Velzen	Michelle Flemming	"River Deep - Mountain High"	The Sing Off
7	Marco Borsato	Marieke Dollekamp	"How Am I Supposed to Live Without You"	Safe
8	Roel van Velzen	Sacha van Beek	"You Know I'm No Good"	Eliminated
9	Marco Borsato	Nora Dalal	"There You'll Be"	Eliminated
10	Roel van Velzen	Wouter Vink	"I Don't Want to Be"	Safe
11	Marco Borsato	Bart Brandjes	"Let's Stay Together"	Safe
12	Roel van Velzen	Paul Turner	"Thunder In My Heart"	Safe

Non-competition performances

Order	Performers	Song
1	Michael Bublé & Michelle Flemming	"Everything"
2	Marco Borsato & Marieke Dollekamp	"Wereld Zonder Jou"

=== Liveshow 3 ===
Competition performances

Order	Coach	Artist	Song	Result
1	Angela Groothuizen	Laura Estévez	"Trouble"	The Sing Off
2	Nick & Simon	Chris Hordijk	"When I Get You Alone"	Safe
3	Angela Groothuizen	Rodney Elzer	"Everlasting Love"	Eliminated
4	Nick & Simon	Marloes van Ommen	"Since U Been Gone"	The Sing Off
5	Angela Groothuizen	Erwin Nyhoff	"Always On My Mind"	Safe
6	Nick & Simon	Danjil Tuhumena	"Chariot"	Eliminated
7	Angela Groothuizen	Niels Geusebroek	"Save The World"	Safe
8	Nick & Simon	Charly Luske	"Run to You"	Safe

Non-competition performances

Order	Performers	Song
1	Jessie J & Marloes van Ommen	"Price Tag"
2	Angela Groothuizen & her team	"Beautiful Day"
3	Nick & Simon & their team	"Waiting On The World To Change"
4	Both the teams	"Earth Song"

=== Liveshow 4 ===
Competition performances

Order	Coach	Artist	Song	Result
1	Marco Borsato	Marieke Dollekamp	"Tell Me 'bout It"	Eliminated
2	Roel van Velzen	Guy Barzily	"Rock with You"	Eliminated
3	Marco Borsato	Iris Kroes	"Listen to Your Heart"	Safe
4	Roel van Velzen	Paul Turner	"Born This Way"	Safe
5	Marco Borsato	Bart Brandjes	"Superstition"	The Sing Off
6	Roel van Velzen	Michelle Flemming	"Wonderful World"	The Sing Off
7	Marco Borsato	Sharon Doorson	"Crazy In Love"	Safe
8	Roel van Velzen	Wouter Vink	"Heaven"	Safe

Non-competition performances

Order	Performers	Song
1	VanVelzen & his team	"Baby Get Higher"
2	Ben Saunders & Sharon Doorson	"If You Don't Know Me By Now"
3	Marco Borsato & his team	"Do They Know It's Christmas?"
4	Both the teams	"Christmas medley"

=== Quarter finals ===
Competition performances

Order	Coach	Artist	Song	Result
1	Marco Borsato	Iris Kroes	"When Love Takes Over"	The Sing Off
2	Nick & Simon	Chris Hordijk	"The A Team"	The Sing Off
3	Roel van Velzen	Michelle Flemming	"Sober"	Eliminated
4	Angela Groothuizen	Laura Estévez	"R U Kiddin' Me"	Eliminated
5	Nick & Simon	Charly Luske	"Signed, Sealed & Delivered"	Safe
6	Marco Borsato	Sharon Doorson	"I Have Nothing"	Safe
7	Roel van Velzen	Wouter Vink	"Rain Down On Me"	The Sing Off
8	Angela Groothuizen	Niels Geusebroek	"Old and Wise"	Safe
9	Roel van Velzen	Paul Turner	"Somebody That I Used To Know"	Safe
10	Angela Groothuizen	Erwin Nyhoff	"No Mercy"	The Sing Off
11	Marco Borsato	Bart Brandjes	"September"	Eliminated
12	Nick & Simon	Marloes van Ommen	"Umbrella"	Eliminated

Non-competition performances

Order	Performers	Song
1	Di-rect, Niels Geusebroek & Charly Luske	"Times Are Changing"

=== Semifinals ===
Competition performances

Order	Coach	Artist	Type	Song	Result
1	Angela Groothuizen	Erwin Nyhoff	Solo Song	"Rumour Has It"	Safe
2	Marco Borsato	Iris Kroes	Solo Song	"Nothing Else Matters"	Safe
3	Nick & Simon	Chris Hordijk Charly Luske	Duet Song	"Viva La Vida"	
4	Roel van Velzen	Wouter Vink	Solo Song	"The Reason"	Eliminated
5	Marco Borsato	Iris Kroes; Sharon Doorson	Duet Song	"Crazy"	
6	Nick & Simon	Charly Luske	Solo Song	"Nobody's Wife"	Eliminated
7	Roel van Velzen	Paul Turner	Solo Song	"Reach Out, I'll Be There"	Safe
8	Angela Groothuizen	Niels Geusebroek	Solo Song	"Titanium"	Eliminated
9	Roel van Velzen	Wouter Vink; Paul Turner	Duet Song	"Don't Let The Sun Go Down On Me"	
10	Nick & Simon	Chris Hordijk	Solo Song	"Poker Face"	Safe
11	Marco Borsato	Sharon Doorson	Solo Song	"We Found Love"	Eliminated
12	Angela Groothuizen	Erwin Nyhoff; Niels Geusebroek	Duet Song	"This Ain't a Love Song"	

Non-competition performances

Order	Performers	Song
1	Alain Clark & Sharon Doorson	"Blow Me Away"

==== Results show ====
Artist	Coach	Points coach	Points voters	Total	Result
Erwin Nyhoff	Angela Groothuizen	55	46,8	101,8	finalist
Niels Geusebroek	Angela Groothuizen	45	53,2	98,2	Eliminated
Iris Kroes	Marco Borsato	51	74,4	125,4	finalist
Sharon Doorson	Marco Borsato	49	25,6	74,6	Eliminated
Paul Turner	Roel van Velzen	49	52	101	finalist
Wouter Vink	Roel van Velzen	51	48	99	Eliminated
Chris Hordijk	Nick & Simon	49	55,5	104,5	finalist
Charly Luske	Nick & Simon	51	44,5	95,5	Eliminated

At the end of the show, all finalists sang their single.

Order	Performer	Song
1	Erwin Nyhoff	"Nights in White Satin"
2	Iris Kroes	"I Can't Make You Love Me"
3	Paul Turner	"Don't Stop Me Now"
4	Chris Hordijk	"Time After Time"

=== Finals ===
Competition performances

Order	Coach	Artist	Type	Song	Result
1	Angela Groothuizen	Erwin Nyhoff (met Gavin DeGraw)	Duet Song	"In Love with a Girl"	
2	Roel van Velzen	Paul Turner	Solo Song	"Thunder In My Heart"	Eliminated
3	Marco Borsato	Iris Kroes (met Birdy)	Duet Song	"Skinny Love"	
4	Nick & Simon	Chris Hordijk	Solo Song	"The A Team"	Safe
5	Angela Groothuizen	Erwin Nyhoff	Solo Song	"The River"	Safe
6	Roel van Velzen	Paul Turner (met Taio Cruz)	Duet Song	"Dynamite"	
7	Marco Borsato	Iris Kroes	Solo Song	"Someone Like You"	Safe
8	Nick & Simon	Chris Hordijk (met Lisa Lois)	Duet Song	"It's Only Love"	

==== Results show ====
Order	Artist	Song	Percentage	Result
1	Paul Turner	"Don't Stop Me Now"	-	Fourth place
2	Erwin Nyhoff	"Nights in White Satin"	-	Third place
3	Chris Hordijk	"Time After Time"	49%	Runner-Up
4	Iris Kroes	"I Can't Make You Love Me"	51%	Winner

=== Celebrity performances ===
Week	Performer	Song	Show
1	Lenny Kravitz	"Black and White America"	Result show
2	Michael Bublé	"Christmas (Baby Please Come Home)"	Result show
3	Jessie J	"Domino"	Liveshow
4	Ben Saunders	"Heart Strings (This Is Love)"	Result show
5	Di-rect	"Young Ones"	Result show
6	Glennis Grace & Edwin Evers	"Wil Je Niet Nog 1 Nacht"	Result show
7	Gavin DeGraw	"Not Over You"	Liveshow
7	Taio Cruz	"Hangover"	Result show

== Ratings ==
=== The voice of Holland - Episodes ===
Episode	Date	Viewers	Place	Market share	Audience rating	Source
The Blind Auditions 1	23 September 2011	3.271.000	1	21,5	47,5	
The Blind Auditions 2	30 September 2011	3.514.000	1	23,0	51,0	
The Blind Auditions 3	7 October 2011	3.298.000	1	21,6	43,7	
The Blind Auditions 4	14'October 2011	3.627.000	1	23,8	51,3	
The Blind Auditions 5	21 October 2011	3.311.000	1	21,7	43,3	
The Blind Auditions 6	28 October 2011	3.872.000	1	25,4	50,7	
The Battles 1	4 November 2011	3.564.000	1	23,4	49,4	
The Battles 2	11 November 2011	3.502.000	1	23,0	43,1	
The Battles 3	18 November 2011	3.655.000	1	24,0	46,2	
The Battles 4	25 November 2011	3.350.000	1	22,0	44,8	
Liveshow 1	2 December 2011	3.615.000	1	23,7	46,2	
Liveshow 1: The Results	2 December 2011	2.257.000	3	14,8	42,7	
Liveshow 2	9 December 2011	3.220.000	1	21,1	43,6	
Liveshow 2: The Results	9 December 2011	2.380.000	2	15,6	41,2	
Liveshow 3	16 December 2011	2.905.000	1	19,0	39,8	
Liveshow 3: The Results	16 December 2011	1.950.000	4	12,8	37,6	
Liveshow 4	23 December 2011	3.017.000	1	19,8	39,5	
Liveshow 4: The Results	23 December 2011	2.214.000	2	14,5	39,2	
Quarter Finals	6 January 2012	2.936.000	1	19,2	39,0	
Quarter Finals: The Results	6 January 2012	2.017.000	4	13,4	38,7	
The Sing Off	7 January 2012	2.150.000	1	14,0	29,5	
Semi-finals	13 January 2012	3.310.000	1	21,6	41,9	
Semi-finals: The Results	13 January 2012	2.204.000	3	14,4	47,1	
The Finals	20 January 2012	3.689.000	1	24,1	45,1	
The Finals: The Results	20 January 2012	3.204.000	3	20,9	52,9	

=== The voice of Holland - Real Life ===
Episode	Date	Viewers	Place	Market share	Audience rating	Source
The Real Life 1	October 26, 2011	1.079.000	8	7,1	16,7	
The Real Life 2	November 2, 2011	767.000	19	5,0	11,3	
The Real Life 3	November 9, 2011	883.000	15	5,8	13,8	
The Real Life 4	November 16, 2011	843.000	15	5,5	12,5	
The Real Life 5	November 23, 2011	727.000	17	4,8	10,7	
The Real Life 6	November 30, 2011	984.000	11	6,5	14,9	
The Real Life 7	December 7, 2011	793.000	19	5,2	11,3	
The Real Life 8	December 14, 2011	806.000	14	5,3	12,5	

== See also ==
- The Voice (TV series)
