= Pure Air =

Compilation album of re-recordings and cover tracks by Agua de Annique
- Released: 2009
- Genres: Alternative rock, pop rock
- Label: Agua Recordings

Agua de Annique chronology
Air (2007)	Pure Air (2009)	In Your Room (2009)

Pure Air is a compilation album by Agua de Annique, a band formed by the former The Gathering vocalist Anneke van Giersbergen. It was released in 2009. It contains tracks from their first album Air, and also songs featuring other artists.

== Track list ==
1. "The Blower's Daughter (feat. Danny Cavanagh from Anathema)" (Damien Rice cover)
2. "Beautiful One (feat. Niels Geusebroek from Silkstone)"
3. "Wild Flowers" (Frank Boeijen cover)
4. "Day After Yesterday (feat. Marike Jager)"
5. "Come Wander with Me (feat. Kyteman)" (Jeff Alexander cover)
6. "Valley of the Queens (feat. Arjen Lucassen from Ayreon)" (Ayreon cover)
7. "To Catch a Thief (feat. John Wetton from King Crimson & Asia)" (John Wetton & Geoff Downes cover)
8. "Ironic" (Alanis Morissette cover)
9. "What's the Reason? (feat. Niels Geusebroek from Silkstone)" (Silkstone cover)
10. "Yalin"
11. "Somewhere (feat. Sharon den Adel from Within Temptation)" (Within Temptation cover)
12. "Witnesses"
13. "The Power of Love" (Frankie Goes to Hollywood cover)

== Personnel ==
- Anneke van Giersbergen - vocals, piano
- Joris Dirks - guitars, vocals
- Jacques de Haard - bass
- Rob Snijders - drums

=== Special guests ===
- John Wetton
- Danny Cavanagh
- Arjen Anthony Lucassen
- Sharon den Adel
- Marike Jager
- Niels Geusebroek
- Kyteman
- Marcel Verbeek
- Svetlana Tratch
- Dewi Kerstens
- Ewa Albering
