= King's Song =

King's Song may refer to:

== Royal anthems ==
- Kongesangen, the royal anthem of Norway
- Kungssången, the royal anthem of Sweden

== Contemporary music ==
- "Koningslied", a 2013 song written for the investiture of prince Willem-Alexander as King of the Netherlands. It was released on request of the Nationaal Comité Inhuldiging (the Dutch National Committee Inauguration)
