= Silkstone (group) =

Dutch pop band, active from 1996 to 2009

- Origin: Netherlands
- Genres: Pop
- Years active: 1996-2009
- Labels: Sony BMG
- Past members: Permanent members: Niels Geusebroek; Frans van Essen In last line-up Niels Bik; Dave Besse; Marco Kuypers Earlier members: Daniel van Luipen; Paul van Twisk; Boxie van Gerrisheim; Jeroen Vrolijk

Silkstone was a Dutch pop band that was established in 1996, by singer Niels Geusebroek and guitarist Frans van Essen. There were many changes in line-up of the band with various members that included earlier on Daniel van Luipen (bass), Paul van Twisk (keyboards), Boxie van Gerrisheim and Jeroen Vrolijk (drums).

After initial limited success, they were picked up by Sony BMG that signed them in 2001. Their debut single "Ready" gained heavy play on Dutch radio becoming their first charting hit. Soon followed their debut album What's the Reason that was released on Sony in 2003 and sold more than 15,000 copies. In addition to singer Geusebroek and guitarist van Essen, the line-up of Silkstone now included Niels Bik (drums), Dave Besse (bass) and Marco Kuypers (keyboards). The band toured in Europe and notably the States and Russia.

For their third album, they started working with local producers John Sonnveld and Oscar Holleman and English producers Paul Simm and Sam Frank. The result was Here in Your World released in 2008 with the title track being the first single from the album. The band called quits in 2009, after heaving played for 13 years, with members preferring to go their separate careers.

== After break-up ==
After break-up singer Niels Geusebroek tried to build a solo career and even appeared as a contestant in second season of The Voice of Holland as a contestant in Team Angela (Angela Groothuizen). and reached the semi-finals Top 8 before elimination. After the competition, in 2012, he was featured on vocals on Wildstylez megahit in the Netherlands called "Year of Summer" reaching #3 on the Dutch Top 40.

Frans van Essen established a company that focuses on sound design / production and songwriting. The assignments vary from music for television, advertising, film and websites to songwriting. He has written for writes songs for pop and soul singer Alain Clark, hip hop artist Blaxtar, pop singer Gordon Heuckeroth, Dewi Pelcher and Raphaella (both from Dutch Idols), as well as Romanga (r.o.o.o.m), Paul Simm, Sam Frank and Michael Garvin. His works through his own studio in Amsterdam. In 2013, he plans to release his album "Battles of 1977". It will include collaboration with a number of artists including Rudeboy from Urban Dance Squad and Ray Slijngaard from 2 Unlimited.

== Discography ==
=== Albums ===
Year	Single	Chart peak position NED Album Top 100
2003	What's the Reason	43
2008	Here in Your World	36

=== Singles ===
Year	Single	Chart peak position NED Dutch Top 40
2002	"Ready"	40
2002	"Rain Has Come"	-
2002	"Blue X-mas"	-
2003	"What's the Reason"	Tip 3
2003	"Lost"	-
2008	"What's the Reason"	35
