= K3 Bengeltjes =

2012 film

- Theatrical release poster
- Directed by: Bart Van leemputten
- Written by: Hans Bourlon; Gert Verhulst
- Produced by: Anja van Mensel/Sofie Buytaert
- Distributed by: Kinepolis Film Distribution (Belgium); Independent Films (Netherlands)
- Release date: 12 December 2012
- Running time: 77 minutes
- Countries: Belgium; Netherlands
- Language: Dutch

K3 Bengeltjes is the fourth movie with K3. It was directed by Bart Van Leemputten. It is the first movie with new member Josje Huisman.

== Plot ==
The girls of K3 are excited because their cousins will come to visit them for the weekend. But their excitement is quickly dissipated, because their cousins are obnoxious. They break everything in their apartment. Karen calls them terrorists. Angel Manuel sends his assistant Tuur to take K3's cousins, but he accidentally takes K3 instead and makes them into "rascal angels". K3 must be well behaved for 24 hours, but that is not as easy as you think.

== Cast ==
Character	Actor
Karen	Karen Damen
Kristel	Kristel Verbeke
Josje	Josje Huisman
Marcel	Jacques Vermeire
Bas	Winston Post
Rosie	Metta Gramberg
Tuur, Manuel's assistant	Chris Van den Durpel
Manuel	Michel Van Dousselaere
Nurse	Camilia Blereau
Aunt Linda	Bianca Vanhaverbeke
Weather presentatrice	Jill Peeters
Carlo, Karen's fan	Sam Gooris
Glenn, Kristel's boyfriend	Charly Luske
Guido, K3's manager	Hans Cornelissen
Klaartje, Karen's niece	Laurine Verbruggen
Kelly, Kristel's niece	Tove Tielemans
Jolien, Josje's niece	Fleur Mertens
Angel	Coralie Rasquin

== Voices ==
Character	Actor
Karen	Vic De Wachter
Kristel	Bart Van Leemputten
Josje	Manou Kersting

== Soundtrack ==
The title song of the movie "Waar zijn die Engeltjes" (En.: "Where Are the Angels") came out in July 2012.

- "Waar zijn die Engeltjes"
- "Leugentje Leugentje"
- "Niet Normaal"
- "Gigaleuke Dag"
- "Jurkje"
