= Ron Link (singer) =

Dutch singer and actor

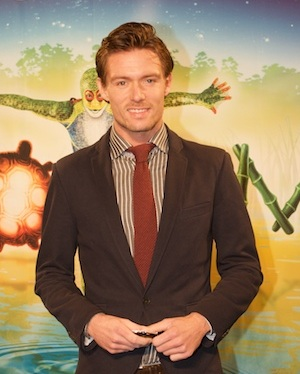
Ron Link in 2010

Ron Link (Nijmegen, 22 September 1979) is a Dutch singer and actor in musical theatre.

== Career ==
He began his career as a model for a sauna promotion. In 2004, he competed in the Dutch version Idols where he managed to reach the final 10 but was ultimately voted off in the third round, making him the eighth finalist. Since then he has made numerous appearances on television programs in the Netherlands.

In 2006, he was chosen in the TV show Wie Wordt Tarzan? (Who is going to be Tarzan?) to play Tarzan in the Dutch version of the musical. The program had one of the highest audience shares of any television program in the Netherlands. Link is played the role in the Netherlands and continued with the production when it moved to Sweden. In preparing for the role, Link got to work with such notable artists as Phil Collins. In 2007, he was awarded with the Nashuatec Musical Award (John Kraaijkamp Musical Award) for new musical talent. Link was seen in cabaret group Purple in 2011.

In 2012, he competed on season 3 of The Voice of Holland, where he was chosen to be on Trijntje Oosterhuis' team.

In 2013, he was performing as lead singer of the Dutch band Colibri.

== Personal life ==
Link was in a committed relationship with fellow Idol star Jamai Loman from 2004 when they met on the program, but they broke up in 2008.
