= Iris Kroes =

Dutch singer-songwriter and harpist

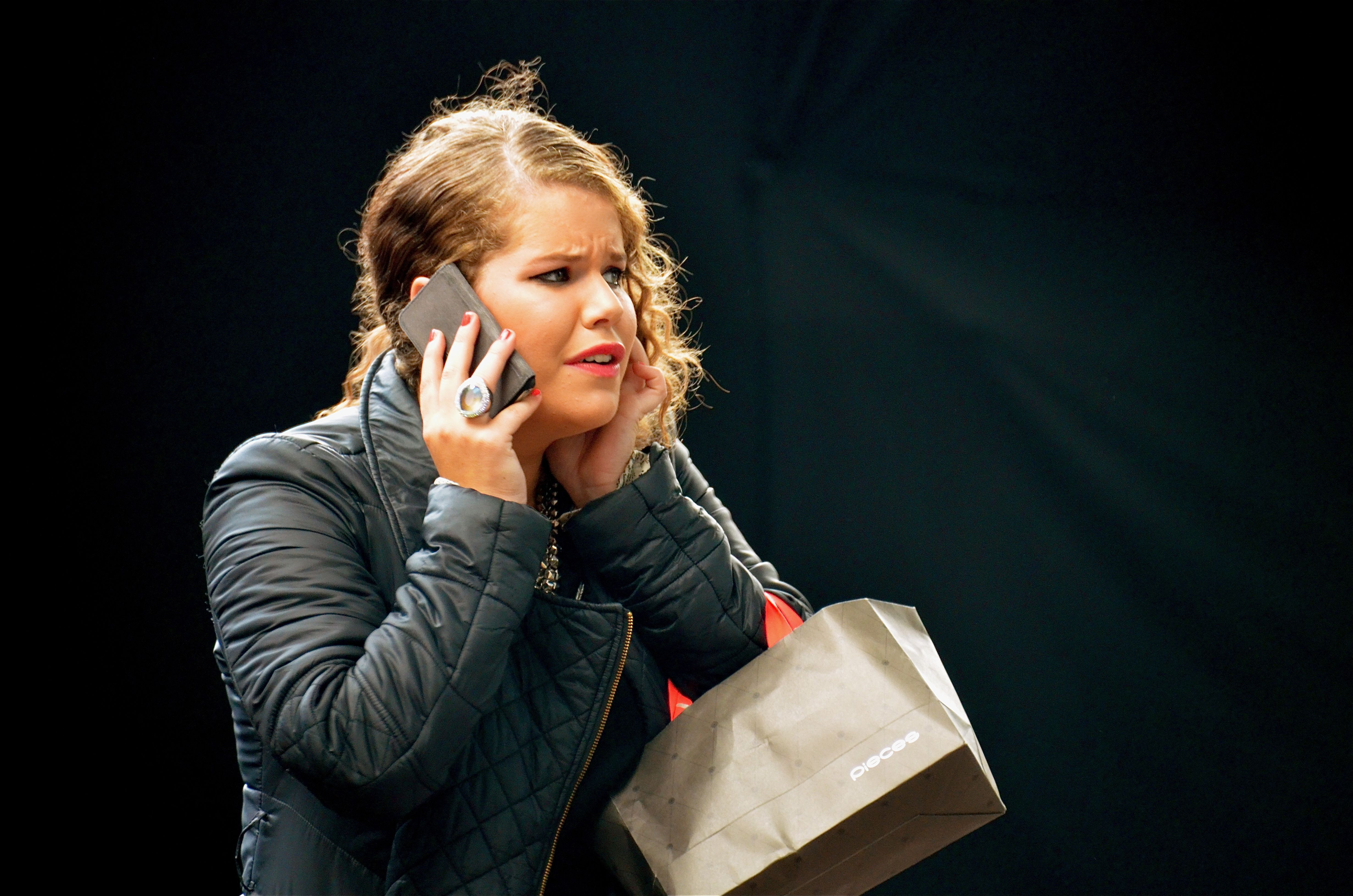
- Iris Kroes, September 13, 2013

Background information
- Born: 11 November 1992 (age 33); Drachten, Netherlands
- Occupation: Singer
- Instruments: Vocals, harp
- Years active: 2011–present
- Label: Independent
- Website: www.iriskroes.com

Iris Kroes (born 11 November 1992 in Drachten) is a Dutch singer-songwriter and harpist (she was called Harpmeisje (Dutch for Harp Girl)). She was the winner of the second season of the television program The Voice of Holland on January 20, 2012, making her the second female contestant worldwide to win the show after Steliyana Khristova, who won the Bulgarian version of the show.

== Early years ==
Iris Kroes was born in a musical family. Her mother was a flute player, while her sister played clarinet and sang, and her father was an ongoing music encyclopedia. Under family influence, Iris began to learn the harp while she was nine and quickly developed a strong interest in the harp.

Prior to her appearance on The Voice of Holland, she had been a harpist for more than a decade and performed as a vocalist in a rock duo based in Drachten alongside Pieter Veenstra, frequently performing both roles simultaneously. Meanwhile, she continued studying between 2005 and 2010 at the Drachtster Lyceum, obtaining her high school diploma and following with a Communications Bachelor. In May 2009 she sang a big band.

== In The Voice of Holland (2011–2012) ==
Iris Kroes' entry of The Voice of Holland started from her Blind Audition at September 30, 2011 where she sang Someone Like You by Adele while also playing the harp. All four judges in this Blind Audition (Marco Borsato, Angela Groothuizen, Nick & Simon and Van Velzen) pressed "I WANT YOU" button and turned their chairs around within the first 15 seconds of her performance. Kroes chose Borsato as her coach.

Kroes drew consistent attention throughout the competition. Many of her renditions during the show became chart entries in the Dutch Single Top 100, like "Foolish Games" (#76), "Listen to Your Heart" (#83), "When Love Takes Over" (#100). Her rendition of Metallica's "Nothing Else Matters reached No. 16 on Single Top 100.

Her winning song and official debut single was Bonnie Raitt's "I Can't Make You Love Me" that entered the official Dutch Top 40 at No. 6, in its first week of release, also making it to No. 3 of the Single Top 100.

== Career After Winning The Voice of Holland (2011–2012) ==
After winning The Voice of Holland (2011–2012), Kroes was awarded with Special Award of Dutch Harp Festival at March 27, 2012 by its Artistic Director Remy van Kesteren in recognition of her achievement with the harp, especially her explorations outside the typical cadre of harp playing, and she was the performance and prize presenting guest on the Second Dutch Harp Competition 2012 (Final) in April 1, 2012, with the prize given to the winner Amandine Carbuccia (France). Kroes was also on tour with her former coach Marco Borsato, which she performed at the Ziggo Dome include twice in 2012. Marco had even offer a surprise present to Kroes on his first of the four concerts of the concert series 'Close On Tour' at Groningen – A brand new harp from Salvi Harps as "a token of my confidence in her great talent".

Kroes' first album First was released on August 24, 2012 with her collections of covered song on The Voice of Holland (2011–2012) of Adele, Michael Jackson and Metallica and others, and two of her originals (New Song and another one).In these songs, the guitar and bass parts were converted to harp. The album reached the fourth position in the album chart, where it lasted six weeks.

In early 2013, Kroes gave the First Frisian single Thús (Homeland) in recognition of her Frisian roots. At the opening of the Fries Museum in September 2013 Kroes sang for Queen Beatrix a song that was written especially for the opening. Since 2013, Kroes was being invited with cruise line Holland America Line as a Guest Entertainer, including voyage season of Year 2014 & 2015.

On 15 January 2014, Kroes' new single Never Coming Back was released with supported by its Theatre Program Thús, with her vocals and harp and a string ensemble from the North Pole Orchestra. From the song Never Coming Back a video is recorded in the area of Valletta, Malta, together with Leeuwarden for Capital of Culture 2018, with the video taking was funded and supported by Malta Tourism Authority. Never Coming Back was included on her second self-released EP It Will Come in Time, released on March 7, 2014, together with the songs It Will Come in Time, The Suit and Of Roses, in which the latter song she had performed with Surimane-Dutch dancer Sedrig Verwoert with support by ABN-AMRO on the talent experiment De Uitwisseling (The Exchange) at August 2014.

Kroes was commissioned in November 2013 by Dutch movie director Steven de Jong to write and perform the theme song Look Up Lizzy on his directed movie Stuk! (English name: Eyecatcher) which was launched in cinemas on both Netherlands and USA on June 11, 2014. She had premiered this song on the Film Premiere at May 22, 2014.

On 23 July 2014 Kroes played and sang the song I still cry, originally written by Julie Miller and performed by Ilse de Lange, during the national memorial service Verbonden in Verdriet (Connected in Sorrow) in the Sint Joriskerk in Amersfoort for Malaysia Airlines Flight 17 Air Disaster with her performance reported worldwide through CNN. This song is now available on free download in her official site. By this song, she had become the voice of a globally mourning for MH17.

In her statement to the Global AIDS community, she wrote:

We can all do nothing against a terrible tragedy, we are powerless and sad.
It's unbelievable that so much innocent families, doctors and children are victim of this plane crash.
People who were willing to help this world to do research for AIDS organizations, have come tragically to the end of their life.
It's a terrible loss for the whole AIDS community, my condolences.

On June 27, 2015, Iris released her first song in Dutch language, Bijna Met Jou (English: Almost With You) for the project 'Fietsliedjes' from provence Drenthe for showing why they are the number one bicycle province of the Netherlands.

Kroes will launch her new series of Theatre Tour Irisistible in the whole Netherlands at January to April 2016.

== Discography ==
=== Albums ===
Year	Title	Chart positions
Year	Title	NL
2012	First	4
2014	It Will Come in Time	

=== Singles ===
Year	Title	Chart positions	
Year	Title	NL 40	NL 100
2011	Foolish games	-	76
2012	Listen to your heart	-	83
2012	When love takes over	-	100
2012	Nothing else matters	-	16
2012	I can't make you love me	6	3
2012	Just more	57	35
2013	Thús		
2014	Never Coming Back		
2014	Look Up Lizzy (Theme song of movie [Stuk!)		

Awards and achievements
Preceded by Ben Saunders	The Voice of Holland; Winner; 2011–12	Succeeded by Leona Philippo
