= Fouradi =

Dutch hip-hop trio

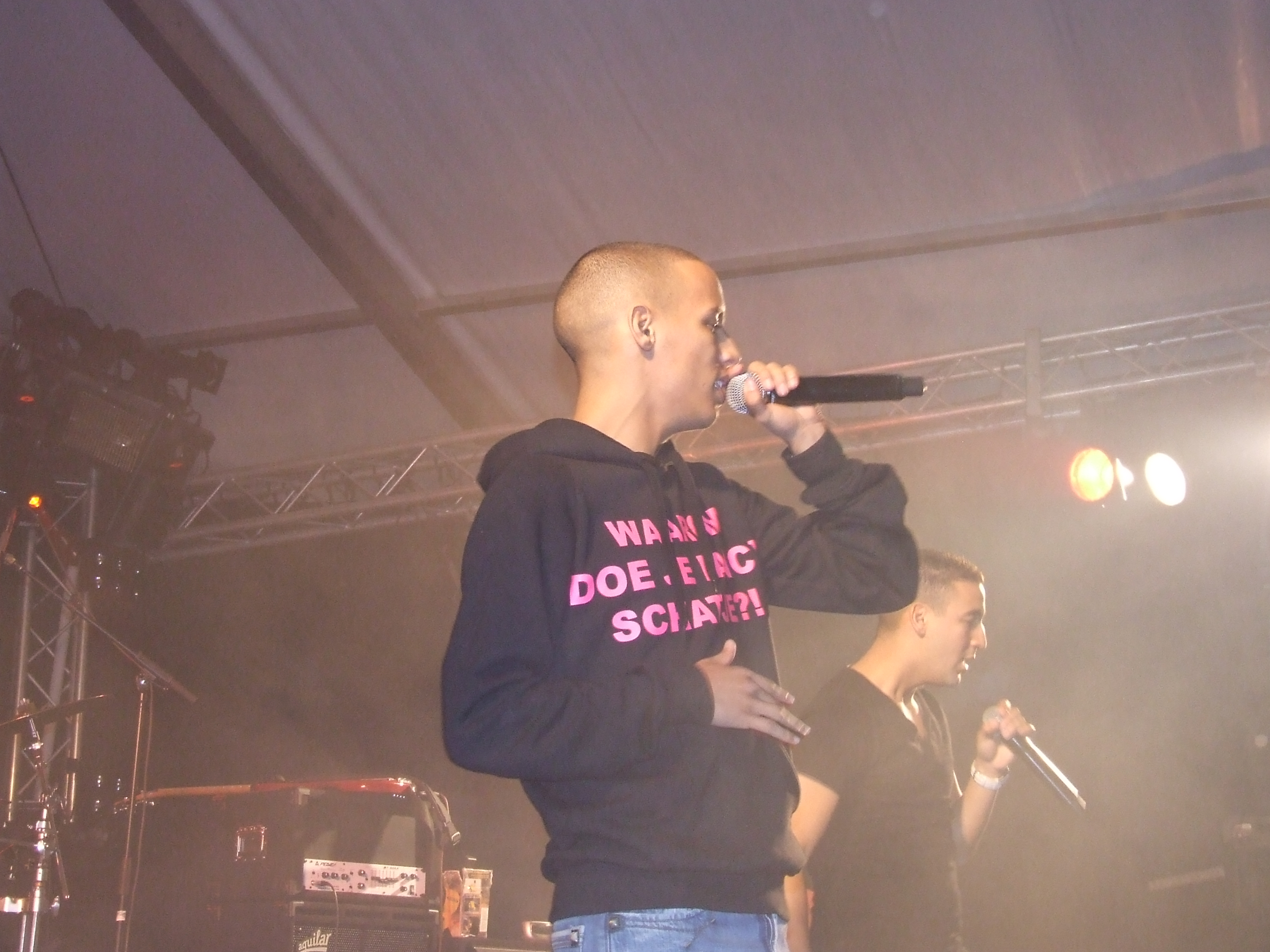

Background information
- Origin: Amsterdam, Netherlands
- Genres: Hip hop, R&B
- Years active: 2005–present
- Label: Walboomers (until 2009)
- Members: Mohamed Fouradi; Brahim Fouradi
- Website: Fouradi.nl

Fouradi was a Dutch hip-hop duo from Amsterdam, Netherlands. The group is composed of Moroccan-Dutch brothers Mohamed (born 5 January 1982) and Brahim (19 November 1985) Fouradi.

== Discography ==
=== Albums ===
Year	Title	Peak chart positions	Notes
Year	Title	NED	Notes
2009	De Favoriete Schoonzoons	—	Tracklist: 1. "Ding" (3:18); 2. "Gemengde gevoelens" (feat. Kim-Lian) (5:27); 3. "Flipmuziek" (3:22); 4. "Blijf" (4:06); 5. "Click Click" (3:41); 6. "Golddiggers" (feat. Will-M) (4:26); 7. "Huiselijk geweld" (feat. Debrah Jade) (4:15); 8. "Een nacht met jou" (feat. Crown) (3:37); 9. "Puberteit" (3:21); 10. "Sneeuw Voor De Zon" (4:14); 11. "Bij je zijn" (feat. Yes-R) (3:57); 12. "West-Side assepoester" (3:12); 13. "Op eigen kracht" (feat. Brainpower & Dicecream) (4:33)

=== Singles ===
Year	Title	Peak chart positions			Album
Year	Title	NED Dutch Top 40	NED Single Top 100	BEL (Fl)	Album
2007	"1 ding"	11	8	—	
2007	"1 ding" (Jumpmasters remix)	—	95	—	
2007	"Flipmuziek"	33	18	—	
2008	"Eén nacht in jou"	29	19	—	
2008	"In je zijn" (feat. Yes-R)	Tip14	36	—	
2009	"Gemengde gevoelens" (feat. Kim-Lian)	Tip10	17	—	
2009	"Gefocust"	Tip10	—	42	
2010	"Ping"	Tip11	20	—	
2011	"Stiekem" (feat. Lange Frans)	—	96	—	
2012	"Lekker bezig"	—	—	Tip89	

Featured in

Year	Title	Peak chart positions			Notes
Year	Title	NED Dutch Top 40	NED Single Top 100	BEL (Fl)	Notes
2013	"Koningslied" (On occasion of the investiture of Willem-Alexander as King of the Netherlands)	2	1	41	(A collective work of many artists including Fouradi)
