= Charly Luske =

Dutch singer and actor (born 1978)

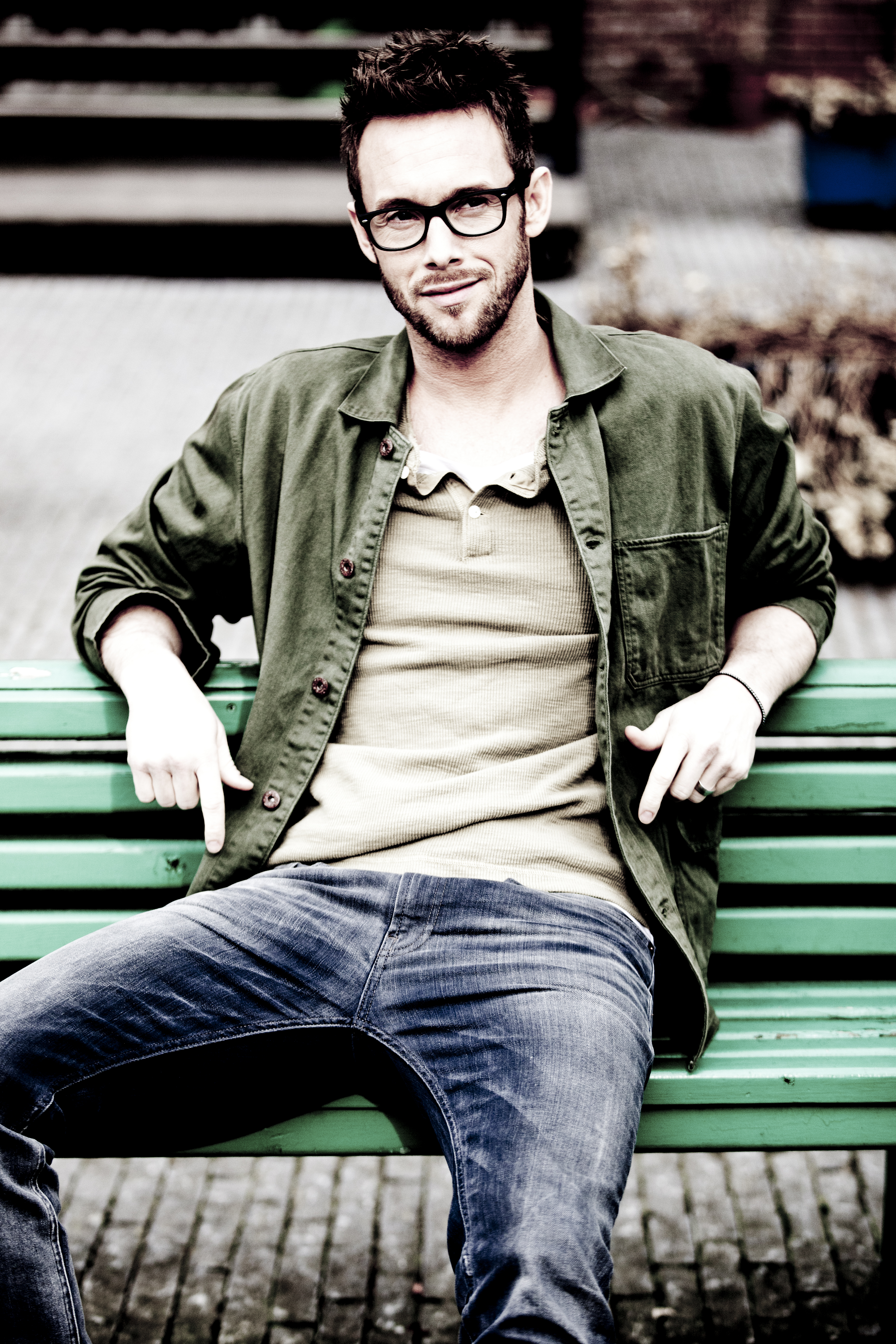
- Charly Luske (2012)
- Born: Charles René Pierre (Charly) Luske-Jess; 19 September 1978 (age 47); Amsterdam, Netherlands
- Occupations: Actor; Singer; Television presenter; Voice actor

Charles René Pierre (Charly) Luske-Jess (born 19 September 1978) is a Dutch singer, actor and television presenter. He is known for playing roles in musicals, including The Wiz and We Will Rock You, and television series, including Goede tijden, slechte tijden and Meiden van de Wit.

== Career ==
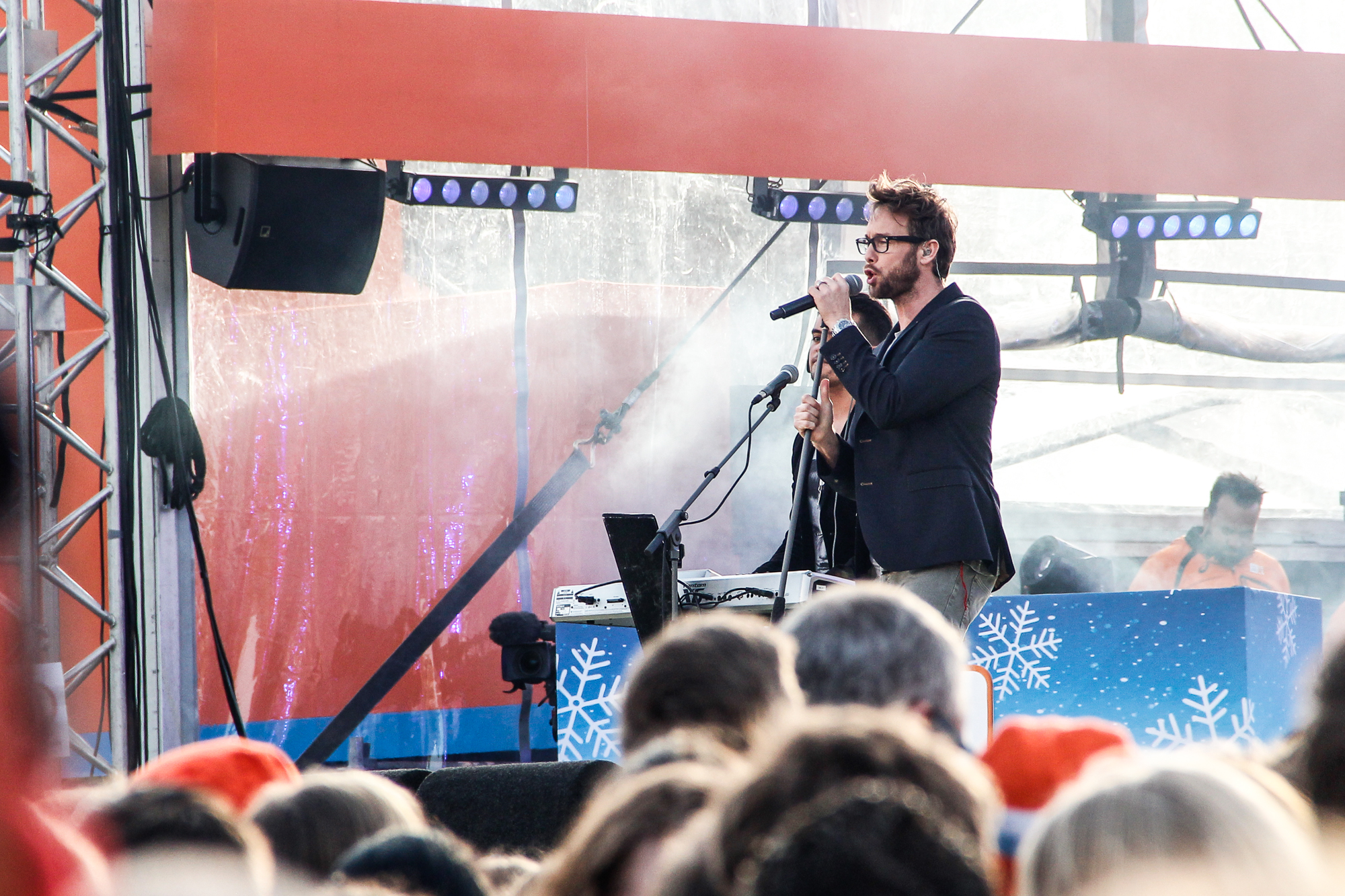
Luske performing a song for the Dutch delegation to the 2014 Winter Olympics after their arrival back in the Netherlands.

In 2005, Luske presented the second season of the television show Het Beste Idee van Nederland. In the show, contestants presented their inventions to a jury and the winning invention was made available for sale in stores.

Luske played the role of lawyer Lars Berenschot in several episodes of the soap opera Goede tijden, slechte tijden. He also played the role of Piet Schuringa in Meiden van de Wit and the role of Peter in the youth television series Zoop. Luske played the role of Judas Iscariot in the 2012 edition of The Passion, a Dutch Passion Play held every Maundy Thursday since 2011. He played roles in multiple musicals, including The Wiz and We Will Rock You.

Luske participated in season two of singing competition show The Voice of Holland where he was eliminated in the semi-finals by Chris Hordijk. He participated in the 2004 edition of the Nationaal Songfestival, an annual competition held almost every year between 1956 and 2012 to select the country's representative for the Eurovision Song Contest. He finished in 4th place.

Luske appeared in a 2012 episode of the television game show De Jongens tegen de Meisjes. In that same year, he also played the role of Glenn in the film K3 Bengeltjes directed by Bart Van Leemputten. In 2013, he participated in the fifth season of the television show Beste Zangers van Nederland. Luske was also a contestant in the quiz show De slimste mens. Luske and his wife Tanja Jess discussed their relationship in an episode of the 2026 television show Mi Dushi: Wat is dan liefde? presented by Wilfred Genee.

== Personal life ==
Luske is married to Dutch actress Tanja Jess and they have two children. They married in August 2008.

== Selected filmography ==
=== As actor ===
- Goede tijden, slechte tijden (2000, 2001)
- Meiden van de Wit (2002, 2003)
- Zoop (2004)
- K3 Bengeltjes (2012)
- Onze Jongens 3 (2025)

=== As presenter ===
- Het Beste Idee van Nederland (2005)

=== As contestant ===
- De Jongens tegen de Meisjes (2012)
- De beste zangers van Nederland (2013)
- Een goed stel hersens (2018)
- Let's play ball (2025)

=== As himself ===
- Groeten uit 19xx (2018)
- Mi Dushi: Wat is dan liefde? (2026)
