= Groeten uit 19xx =

Dutch television series

- Presented by: Kasper van Kooten (season 1); Natasja Froger (season 2)
- Country of origin: Netherlands
- Original language: Dutch
- No. of seasons: 2
- No. of episodes: 14

Original release
- Release: 10 January 2018 – 14 March 2019

Groeten uit 19xx (Dutch for Greetings from 19xx) is a Dutch television series broadcast by RTL 4. In the show, a Dutch celebrity and their family revisit the year in which they were twelve years old. In each episode, the main guest and their family live a weekend in a house with home decoration of that year as well as hairstyle, clothing, newspapers, radio and television of that year. Kasper van Kooten presented the first season of the show. The show was also Kasper van Kooten's debut as presenter. The second season of the show was presented by Natasja Froger.

The show is based on a similar Belgian show.

== Seasons ==
=== Season 1 ===
Episode	Date	Year	Celebrity
1	10 January 2018	1972	René Froger & Natasja Froger, Danny Froger
2	17 January 2018	1984	Tooske Ragas & Bastiaan Ragas
3	25 January 2018	1980	Leontien van Moorsel
4	31 January 2018	1986	Frans Bauer & Mariska Bauer
5	7 February 2018	1973	Henkjan Smits
6	14 February 2018	1982	Danny de Munk
7	21 February 2018	1979	Tanja Jess & Charly Luske

=== Season 2 ===
Episode	Date	Year	Celebrity
1	24 January 2019	1970	Xandra Brood, Lola Pop Brood, Holly Mae Brood
2	31 January 2019	1988	Klaas van der Eerden
3	7 February 2019	1965	Hans Kazàn
4	14 February 2019	1985	Xander de Buisonjé
5	21 February 2019	1991	Frans Duijts
6	28 February 2019	2003	Roy Donders
7	14 March 2019	1983	Bibian Mentel
