= The Voice of Holland season 3 =

The Voice of Holland
- Season 3
- Hosted by: Martijn Krabbé; Wendy van Dijk; Winston Gerschtanowitz (Red Room/Backstage)
- Coaches: Nick & Simon; Roel van Velzen; Marco Borsato; Trijntje Oosterhuis
- Winner: Leona Philippo
- Winning coach: Trijntje Oosterhuis
- Runner-up: Johannes Rypma
- Finals venue: Studio 22 in Hilversum

Release
- Original network: RTL 4
- Original release: 24 August – 14 December 2012

Season chronology
- ← Previous; Season 2 Next → Season 4

The Voice of Holland (season 3) was the third season of the Dutch reality singing competition, created by media tycoon John de Mol Jr. and the first sophomore season ever of the show's format. It was aired from August to December 2012 on RTL 4.

One of the important premises of the show is the quality of the singing talent. Four coaches, themselves popular performing artists, train the talents in their group and occasionally perform with them. Talents are selected in blind auditions, where the coaches cannot see, but only hear the auditioner.

Martijn Krabbé and Wendy van Dijk, who was co-hosting season two, remained as co-hosts. Winston Gerschtanowitz was interviewing the contestants and their inmates backstage.

Nick & Simon and Roel van Velzen returned for their third and final season as coaches, while Marco Borsato returned for his second season. Angela Groothuizen was replaced by singer Trijntje Oosterhuis. She won in her first season through her team contestant Leona Philippo in the final held on 14 December 2012 against over Johannes Rypma for Team Nick & Simon who came runner-up. Leona Philippo's win came with 56% of the votes in her favor. The ratings for the last show where the highest ratings The Voice of Holland ever had. 4.6 million people watched the show.

== Summary of competitors ==
Competitors' table
– Winner
– Runner-up
– Third
– Fourth
– Eliminated after semi-finals
– Eliminated after quarter finals
– Eliminated during first or second live round
– Eliminated during the Battle rounds

Team	Top 64 Artists			
Marco Borsato				
Marco Borsato	Ivar Oosterloo	Barbara Straathof	Anja Dalhuisen	Babette van Vugt
Marco Borsato	Omri Tindal	Niña van Dijk	Pomme van de Ven	Jared Hiwat
Marco Borsato	Jayms	Mindy Broeren-Martosoedjono	Inge McGee	Maaike Hagar
Marco Borsato	Petra Creutzberg	Linda Smeets	Claudia van den Anker	Kelita Gallant
Trijntje Oosterhuis				
Trijntje Oosterhuis	Leona Philippo	Sandra van Nieuwland	Tessa Belinfante	Laurrhie Brouns
Trijntje Oosterhuis	Velorisa Yorks	Ron Link	Patt Riley	Denzel Dongen
Trijntje Oosterhuis	Paula Pielanen	Pip Whien	Loes van de Mars	Hagar Daoudi
Trijntje Oosterhuis	Marco Gerits	Hilde Vos	Gerrie van Dijk-Dantuma	Sotiri Antonakoudis
Nick & Simon				
Nick & Simon	Johannes Rypma	Maame Joses	Salóme Pieris	Claudia de Graaf
Nick & Simon	Nicola Ebbink	Marx Margono	Mathijs Rumping	Janine Heines
Nick & Simon	Koert Witteman	Kristel Roulaux	Liza Vermeer	Marco Oostra
Nick & Simon	Claire Melchiot	Natascha Vergeer	Natalja Majoor	Jean-Louis Finta
VanVelzen				
VanVelzen	Floortje Smit	Eyelar Mirzazadeh	Marjet van den Brand	Sam Holden
VanVelzen	Sifra Geessink	Randy Soewarno	Katty Heath	David Gonçalves
VanVelzen	Paul van Commenee	Ginger Kleinee	Vernice Marques	Charlotte Fisser
VanVelzen	Bart Reinders	Sebastiano Zafarana	Anneloes Wigboldus	Desi van Doeveren
