= Amsterdamned =

1988 Dutch horror film by Dick Maas

- Theatrical release poster
- Directed by: Dick Maas
- Written by: Dick Maas
- Produced by: Laurens Geels; Dick Maas
- Starring: Huub Stapel; Monique van de Ven; Serge-Henri Valcke; Hidde Maas; Wim Zomer
- Cinematography: Marc Felperlaan
- Edited by: Hans van Dongen
- Music by: Dick Maas
- Production company: First Floor Features
- Distributed by: Concorde Film
- Release date: 11 February 1988
- Running time: 105 minutes
- Country: Netherlands
- Language: Dutch
- Budget: ƒ4.2 million

Amsterdamned is a 1988 Dutch thriller slasher film directed and written by Dick Maas, and stars Huub Stapel, Monique van de Ven, and Serge-Henri Valcke. The plot revolves around a serial killer who uses canals of Amsterdam to murder random people, one of which involves a detective's girlfriend linked to the murders.

== Plot ==
The film opens with a point-of-view shot, as a murderer surveys Amsterdam's canals at night. He slips into the back of a Chinese restaurant, steals a butcher's knife, and stalks his first victim, a prostitute. After she fights off a taxi driver, the killer stabs her and drags her body into the water, watched by a homeless person. The next morning, a tour boat collides with her corpse, horrifying the passengers.

Detective Eric Visser is assigned to the case. Eric, raising his thirteen-year-old daughter Anneke, is respected despite his late nights and occasional drink. His partner Vermeer takes him to the crime scene where another officer questions the bag lady, who insists it was a monster who rose from the water.

That night, two environmentalists investigating a chemical plant are attacked; one is dragged under, and the other finds his severed head attached to the anchor, before being pulled in himself. Eric and Vermeer examine the bodies and realise they are facing a serial killer. Eric reunites with John, an old friend from the river police, and they begin working together.

During an investigation at a sporting club, Eric meets Laura, a museum guide, and her friend Martin Ruysdael, a psychiatrist. Eric and Laura quickly develop feelings for each other. Meanwhile, the killer strikes again, murdering a salvationist and a young woman on an inflatable sunbed. Frustrated at the lack of progress, Eric and John pursue a chemical plant ex-employee, but Eric doubts his guilt.

That night, while Eric spends time with Laura, the killer sinks a boat. John investigates but is ambushed and killed. Later, when the killer is spotted at a marina, a high-speed speedboat chase follows through the canals and ends in the sewers, where Eric is shot with a harpoon gun, but manages to shoot the killer's mask before collapsing.

Eric wakes in hospital while Laura investigates Martin's house. She finds the damaged mask, and believes him to be the killer. Eric rushes to her aid. Laura beats Martin when he returns, but the real killer emerges from the water and seizes Laura. Eric arrives just in time to shoot him but he escapes. The killer is revealed as Martin's childhood friend, disfigured by uranium hexafluoride poisoning and driven to murder. He takes his own life with the harpoon gun before Eric can apprehend him.

The film closes with Eric and Laura together on a pedalo, drifting through the canals.

== Cast ==
- Huub Stapel as Eric Visser
- Monique van de Ven as Laura
- Serge-Henri Valcke as Vermeer
- Tanneke Hartzuiker as Potter
- Wim Zomer as John van Meegeren
- Tatum Dagelet as Anneke Visser
- Hidde Maas as Martin Ruysdael
- Lou Landré as Chef
- Edwin Bakker as Willy
- Barbara Martijn as Prostitute
- Leontine Ruiters as Girl in gumboat (credited as Leontien Ruyters)
- Jules Croiset as Mayor
- Jaap Stobbe as Cab driver

== Production ==
Writer director Dick Maas got the idea for the film's killer after reading a news story about an Amsterdam prison escape that was conducted with the assistance of a frogman.

=== Stunts ===
The speedboat chase scene and other stunts were handled by Dickey Beer. Legendary stuntman turned stunt coordinator Vic Armstrong worked on the film as a stuntman. The speedboat chase scene left Huub Stapel out of production for three weeks when the boat he rode in crashed on the set of the film. Parts of the speedboat chase were filmed in the Oudegracht of Utrecht.

== Release ==
=== Reception ===
At the American Film Market in 1988, the movie would go on to become the third highest selling motion picture that year. Vestron Pictures released the film dubbed in English on home video. The dubbed version featured the voices of lead actors Huub Stapel, Monique van de Ven, and Serge-Henri Valcke in English, as they spoke English well. The film was given a limited release, grossing $14,819 on five screens in its opening weekend in North America, and a total of $98,003 over its entire run.

=== Home media ===
Amsterdamned was released on home video in the United Kingdom by Vestron in November 1989.

== Sequel ==
A sequel film, Amsterdamned II, with Maas directing and Stapel reprising his role as Detective Visser was released in the Netherlands on 4 December 2025 by Splendid Film.
