= Chris Van den Durpel =

Belgian impressionist and actor

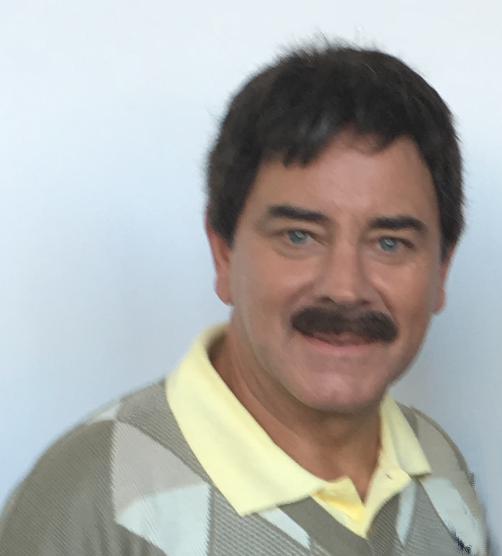
- Born: 10 July 1960 (age 65); Lokeren, Belgium
- Occupations: Actor, impressionist, comedian

Chris Van den Durpel (born 7 October 1960) is a Belgian impressionist and actor. He became known for his parody of Paul Jambers (Paul Schampers) and Herman Le Compte and self-made characters such as Kamiel Spiessens, Jimmy B.,Snelle Eddy, Ronny King and Firmin Crets. He is also famous as an imitator of famous Flemish and Dutch people. Van den Durpel has also recorded various humorous songs in the guise of his comedy characters.

== Filmography ==
- 1997: Oesje!
- 2002: Ice Age (Flemish dub)
- 2005: Robots (Flemish dub)
- 2006: Ice Age: The Meltdown (Flemish dub)
- 2007: Firmin
- 2007: The Simpsons Movie (Flemish dub)
- 2009: Ice Age: Dawn of the Dinosaurs (Flemish dub)
- 2012: K3 Bengeltjes
- 2013: Marina
- 2015: Mega Mindy versus Rox
- 2017: Het tweede gelaat

== Television ==
- 1994: Buiten De Zone
- 1997: Schalkse Ruiters
- 1998–2004: Chris & Co
- 2011–2015: ROX
- 2014: Celebrity Family Feud
- 2017: Allemaal Chris

== Theatre ==
- 2001–2002: Kuifje – De Zonnetempel
- 2008–2009: Daens
- 2013: Shrek The Musical
- 2022-2024: Kamiel Spiessens Spijbelt
- 2024-...: Kamiel Spiessens Spartelt
