= Anneke van Giersbergen (band) =

Dutch musical project

Anneke van Giersbergen & Agua de Annique
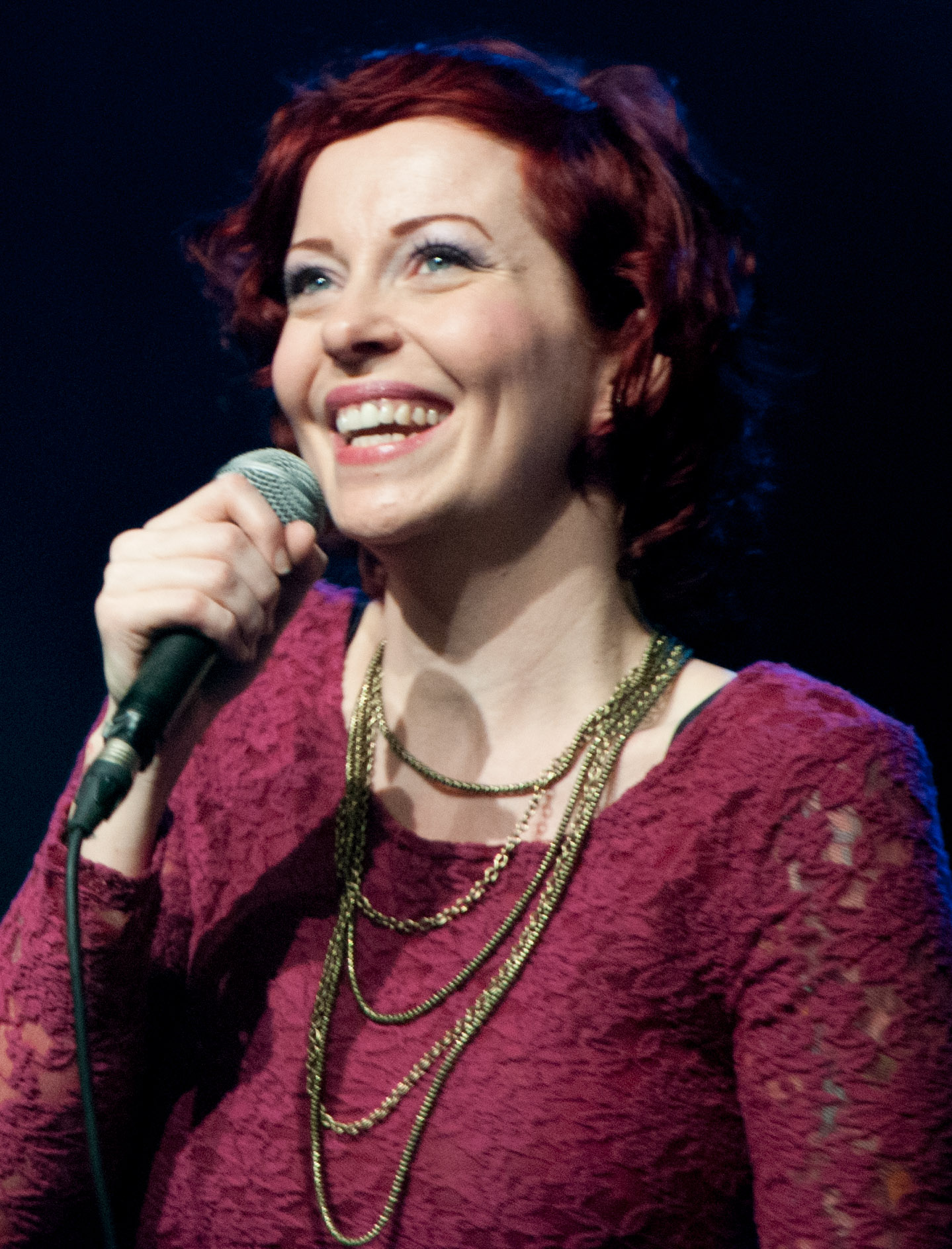
- Anneke van Giersbergen in 2014

Background information
- Also known as: Agua de Annique
- Origin: Oss, Netherlands
- Genres: Alternative rock; pop rock
- Years active: 2007–2011
- Website: www.annekevangiersbergen.com

Anneke van Giersbergen & Agua de Annique was the solo project of the former The Gathering vocalist, Anneke van Giersbergen.

== History ==
The project was announced on 5 June 2007, the same day that both The Gathering and Anneke van Giersbergen issued separate announcements that van Giersbergen would leave the band in August.

=== Air and Pure Air (2007–2008) ===
She and her new bandmates laid down some basic tracks for the first album at the Waterfront Studios in Rotterdam and recorded overdubs at The Void in Eindhoven, as well as in her own home studio. Several of these songs were made available on the band's official web site. A track, "Ice Water", has been said to feature a string arrangement by Jeffrey Fayman. Additional vocals for the track "Lost and Found" were done by Kristin Fjellseth, who also wrote the track "Sunken Soldiers Ball". Heleen de Witte is said to play flute on unspecified tracks while Timothy Conroy provides some trumpet work. They released their first album called Air at the end of 2007, mixed by Jon Anders Narum.

For the week ending 2 July 2009, Pure Air (a compilation of tracks from Air but also of songs featuring Anneke with other artists like Within Temptation) entered the GfK Dutch Charts at No.42 during the first week of release, her highest ever chart position.

=== In Your Room (2009–2010) ===
A second album, titled In Your Room, was released on 30 October 2009. Under the name Anneke van Giersbergen & Agua de Annique, they released the concert album Live in Europe in 2010.

=== Anneke van Giersbergen's solo career (2011–present) ===
In 2011, Anneke signed to PIAS Records as a solo artist. Her debut album under her own name, Everything Is Changing, was released on 20 January 2012.

== Line-up ==
Last line-up

- Anneke van Giersbergen - lead vocals, rhythm guitar (2007-2011), keyboards, piano (2007-2009)
- Rob Snijders - drums (2007-2011)
- Annelies Kuijsters - keyboards, piano, backing vocals (2009-2011)
- Joost van Haaren - bass (2010-2011)
- Thomas Martens - lead guitar (2010-2011)

Former Members

- Jacques de Haard - bass (2007-2010)
- Joris Dirks - lead guitar, backing vocals (2007-2009)

Touring Members

- Ruud Jolie - lead guitar (2010)

== Discography ==
=== Albums ===
- Air (2007)
- Pure Air (2009)
- In Your Room (2009)
- Live in Europe (2010, live album)

=== Singles ===
- Day After Yesterday (2007) - includes "Witnesses"
- Come Wander with Me (2008)
- The Blower's Daughter (2009)
- Hey Okay! (2009)
- Sunny Side Up (2010)
