= Holly Mae Brood =

Dutch actress and presenter (born 1994)

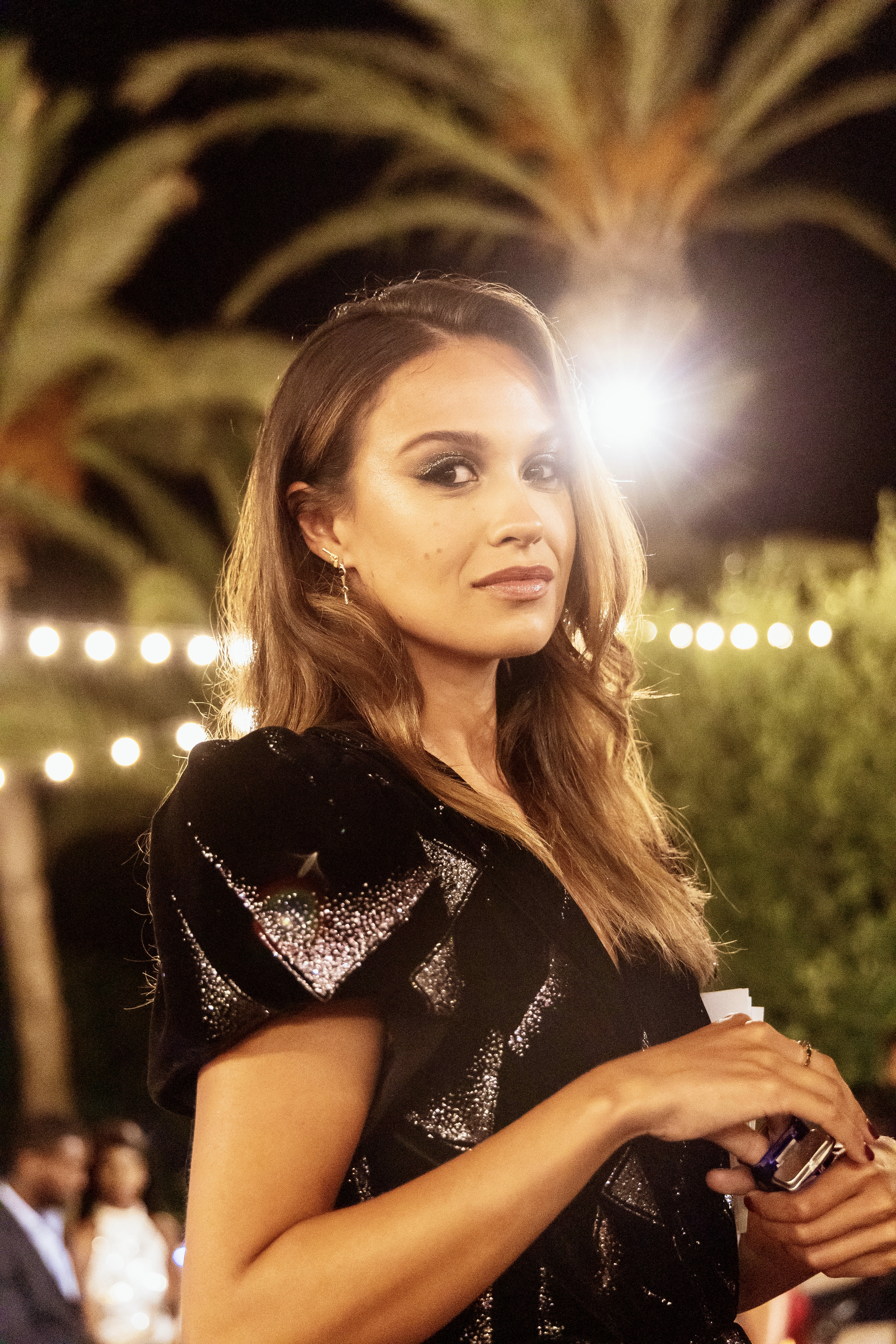
- Brood in 2021
- Born: 25 November 1994 (age 31); Amsterdam, Netherlands
- Occupations: Actress, presenter
- Parents: Herman Brood (father); Xandra Jansen (mother)

Holly Mae Brood (born 25 November 1994) is a Dutch actress and presenter. She is best known for her role as Amy Kortenaer in the soap opera Goede tijden, slechte tijden and the spin-off series Nieuwe Tijden. She is also known as co-host of the Dutch/Flemish version of Love Island. Musician Herman Brood was her stepfather.

== Career ==
=== Film and television ===
Brood played a role in the 2016 films SneekWeek and Hart Beat. She played a role in the 2018 comedy film Mannen van Mars. In 2019, she presented Holland's Next Make Over, a spin-off of Holland's Next Top Model. In that same year, Brood also appeared in the musical Lazarus at the DeLaMar theatre in Amsterdam, Netherlands.

In 2019 and 2020, Brood appeared in the television series Meisje van Plezier. She also played the role of Claudia in the 2020 film Life as It Should Be directed by Ruud Schuurman. In March 2022, she appeared in an episode of the police drama series Flikken Maastricht. Brood appears in the 2022 film Foodies directed by Mannin de Wildt.

Brood plays a lead role in the Netflix film The Takeover directed by Annemarie van de Mond. She also provided the voice for the character Goldilocks in the Dutch version of the film Puss in Boots: The Last Wish. Brood appears in the Videoland series Hockeyvaders. She was one of the team captains in the 2023 television show Alles is Muziek presented by Marieke Elsinga. The show ended after six episodes as a result of disappointing viewing figures.

Brood appears in the 2023 film Alles is nog steeds zoals het zou moeten zijn which is the sequel to the 2020 film Life as It Should Be. She appears in the 2024 film De Break-Up Club directed by Jonathan Elbers. Brood also appears in the 2024 film Tegendraads directed by Ben Sombogaart. She also appears in a 2024 Videoland series about Patty Brard. She appears in the 2024 film Schitterend directed by Maurice Trouwborst. Brood and the band IOS created the title song of the film.

Brood plays a lead role in the 2025 film Amsterdamned II directed and written by Dick Maas. The film won the Golden Film award after having sold over 100,000 tickets. As of January 2026, she is scheduled to appear in the 2027 film De Bovenburen directed by Simone van Dusseldorp. She plays a role in the 2026 television series Rippers which airs on Videoland. As of June 2026, she is scheduled to play a lead role in the Videoland series La Vida Barcelona.

=== Television appearances ===
In 2014, Brood finished in seventh place in the seventh season of Holland's Next Top Model.

She appeared in a 2016 episode of the game show Ik hou van Holland. In 2017, she appeared in the second season of the Dutch singing television show It Takes 2. In that same year, she also appeared in the game show Een goed stel hersens. In 2019, she appeared in an episode of Groeten uit 19xx.

In 2021, Brood played the role of traitor in the television game show De Verraders. In February 2022, she sang a cover of the song Amor, amor, amor by Dutch singer André Hazes in the television show Hazes Is de Basis. Brood appeared in the 2024 season of the television show The Masked Singer where she was eliminated in the semi-finals.

== Personal life ==
Her father, though not her biological father, is musician, painter, actor and poet Herman Brood. Her biological father Leo Spindelaar died in 2009. Fashion designer and artist Lola Pop Brood is her maternal half-sister.

She is in a relationship with Dutch musical actor Soy Kroon. They met in 2016 at an audition for the television series Nieuwe Tijden. In 2017, Brood and Kroon appeared in an episode of the game show De Jongens tegen de Meisjes. In 2018, they both won the fourth season the Dutch television show Dance Dance Dance.

In 2025, she got a tattoo in memory of Manuëla Kemp who died earlier that year.

== Filmography ==
=== Film ===
- SneekWeek (2016)
- Hart Beat (2016)
- Mannen van Mars (2018)
- Life as It Should Be (2020)
- Foodies (2022)
- nl:The Takeover (2022)
- Alles is nog steeds zoals het zou moeten zijn (2023)
- De Break-Up Club (2024)
- Tegendraads (2024)
- Schitterend (2024)
- Amsterdamned II (2025)
- De Bovenburen (2027, upcoming)

=== Television ===
- Goede tijden, slechte tijden (2016 – 2017)
- Nieuwe Tijden (2016 – 2018)
- Meisje van Plezier (2019 – 2020)
- Flikken Maastricht (2022)
- Hockeyvaders (2023, Videoland)
- PATTY (2024)
- Rippers (2026, Videoland)
- La Vida Barcelona (2027, Videoland, upcoming)

=== Voice acting ===
- Puss in Boots: The Last Wish (Goldilocks, 2022)

=== As presenter ===
- Love Island (2019 – 2023)
- I Kissed A Girl (2025, Videoland)

=== As team captain ===
- Alles is Muziek (2023)

=== As contestant ===
- Ik hou van Holland (2016)
- Een goed stel hersens (2017)
- It Takes 2 (2017)
- De Jongens tegen de Meisjes (2017)
- Dance Dance Dance (2018)
- De Verraders (2021)
- The Masked Singer (2024 – 2025)

=== As herself ===
- Unknown Brood (2016)
- Groeten uit 19xx (2019)
- Casa di Beau (2023)
- Gelukkig Hebben We De Foto's Nog (2025)
