= Amsterdamned II =

2025 film directed by Dick Maas

- Theatrical release poster
- Directed by: Dick Maas
- Written by: Dick Maas
- Produced by: Dick Maas; Diede in 't Veld; Edvard van 't Wout
- Starring: Huub Stapel; Holly Mae Brood
- Cinematography: Danny Elsen
- Edited by: Bert Rijkelijkhuizen
- Music by: Dick Maas
- Production companies: Potemkino. Production; Guess Who; Parachute Pictures; 2CFilm
- Distributed by: Splendid Film (Netherlands); WW Entertainment (Belgium)
- Release dates: 1 December 2025 (Amsterdam); 4 December 2025 (Netherlands); 4 February 2026 (Belgium)
- Running time: 110 minutes
- Countries: Netherlands; Belgium
- Language: Dutch
- Budget: €6.5 million
- Box office: $4.2 million

Amsterdamned II is a 2025 Dutch-language crime thriller slasher film written, composed and directed by Dick Maas. It is a sequel to his 1988 film Amsterdamned. The film stars Huub Stapel reprising his role as Detective Eric Visser, along with Holly Mae Brood.

Amsterdamned II premiered on 1 December 2025 in Amsterdam and was released in the Netherlands on 4 December 2025 by Splendid Film. The film received mixed reviews from critics, who praised the action sequences and Maas' direction, but criticized the script and dialogue. The film won the Golden Film award after having sold over 100,000 tickets.

The film finished in 5th place in the list of best-visited Dutch films of 2025. Just over 214,000 tickets were sold in 2025 and just over 301,000 tickets in total, including tickets sold in 2026.

== Plot ==
As an American couple enjoys a midnight cruise on the canals of Amsterdam, they discover their pilot missing before both are dragged underwater and killed. The next morning, tourists discover the corpses of the couple on a burning boat. Detective Tara Lee, a young but determined investigator, is assigned the perplexing case.

The next night, a drag queen is followed along a canal by a mysterious figure. The drag queen's body is found the following morning disembowled on an anchor. Tara realizes the police are likely dealing with a canal-based serial killer. Her chief, Koos van Amstel, decides to call his old friend, retired detective Eric Visser.

Eric was involved in a similar case nearly four decades ago. (Note: As depicted in Amsterdamned (1988)) Eric has returned to Amsterdam to receive a medal for his career. When they meet, Koos explains to Eric that this serial killer appears to be an expert diver, just as in the original case. Moreover, DNA testing, requested by the daughter of the man Eric caught for the original crimes, has suggested the man may have been innocent: his DNA was not at any of the old crime scenes.

Eric and Koos examine the boat from the couple's killing. Eric feels uneasy because the scene reminds him so much of the original killings, including the killer's almost superhuman abilities. Tara is not thrilled about Eric's involvement, although he assures her that he is there simply as an observer. However, at Koos's encouragement, Eric launches his own investigation. Eric visits the daughter of the original "killer"; after a tense conversation where she blames Eric for the death of her father, the daughter slips away.

Two more people are discovered killed in the canal, drowned in a mini-car they drunkenly drove into the water. Tara allows Eric to investigate the scene with her and she warms to him after he deduces how the killings occurred. A disgraced professor meets with Tara and insists the killer is actually a supernatural figure from Dutch folklore, the Bullebak, that haunts canals. Tara scoffs at this suggestion.

Tara and Eric cross paths again as both their investigations lead to Josef, an old diving colleague of the original "killer". Josef flees, inciting an elaborate chase. Eric finally corners Josef on top of a building. Josef cryptically scoffs at Eric's efforts to catch the killer before setting himself on fire and jumping to his death.

After this latest misstep, the Dutch government takes over the investigation, closing the central canals and deploying a military task force. Eric confides to Tara that, as with the original case, he has an uneasy feeling that the killer is something supernatural.

That evening, the military task force attempts to corner the killer in the canals, but it kills five operatives and seemingly disappears. Eric and Tara, relying on Eric's extensive knowledge of the sewer system, deduce where the killer must be headed. They discover a strange lair in the sewers where the killer ambushes them; Eric and Tara shoot at the killer, who flees.

Exiting the sewer in pursuit, Eric and Tara discover a wet-suited body on a nearby dock. The body is revealed to be the daughter of the original killer. Further research reveals that the daughter served in her country's Special Forces division as an expert diver like her Dutch father. Eric remains skeptical that they caught the real killer, however.

Eric receives his medal and is congratulated by Tara. Later, back home in the country, Eric receives a call from Tara, who is set to compete in a swimming race in the canals. Farther ahead in the canal, in front of the swimmers, the camera shows bubbles rising.

== Cast ==
- Huub Stapel as Eric Visser
- Holly Mae Brood as Tara Lee
- Bas Keijzer as Jozef Visbeen
- Tatum Dagelet as Anneke Visser, Eric's daughter
- Dunya Khayame as Helga
- Tarik Moree as Tour Guide
- Ruben Brinkman as Dicke van Dongen
- Mattijn Hartemink as Major General
- Pierre Bokma as Professor
- Tamar van den Dop as Chief of Police

== Production ==
=== Development ===
In a 2013 interview with Schokkend Nieuws, Dick Maas said that in the 90s he had considered making a sequel to Amsterdamned titled Rotterdoom, set in Rotterdam. However, the project never materialized. In 2022, NL Film approached Maas regarding making a sequel to the film, but he declined.

In December 2023, it was announced that Amsterdamned would get a sequel with Huub Stapel reprising his role as Eric Visser. Tatum Dagelet reprises her role as Eric's daughter, Anneke Visser, with Dunya Khayame, Tarik Moree, Ruben Brinkman, Mattijn Hartemink, and Pierre Bokma being cast.

=== Filming ===
Principal photography began on 8 September 2024 in Amsterdam, with further shooting in Alkmaar. Filming concluded on 18 December, with pick up shots scheduled for summer 2025.

=== Post-production ===
The film features over 300 visual effect shots; Generative AI was used for planning, visualization, and visual effects.

=== Marketing ===
The first teaser trailer was released on 18 December 2024. The first and second trailer were released on 7 October 2025 and 22 November 2025.

== Release ==
Amsterdamned II premiered on 1 December 2025 for press and guests at the Tuschinski Theatre in Amsterdam. The film was released in the Dutch cinemas on 4 December 2025 by Splendid Film. It was made available on Amazon Prime Video after its theatrical release. Incredible Film handled international sales for the film. It was the first Dutch IMAX-film.

Kijkwijzer gave the film a 12 rating for violence, fear, drug use, and coarse language. A month after its release, a complaint was filed due to a scene involving a drag queen. As a result, Kijkwijzer added an extra symbol for discrimination.

=== Critical response ===
The film received mixed reviews from critics.

=== Home media ===
The film was released on Amazon Prime Video on 9 March 2026.
