= Leona Philippo =

Canadian-born singer of Jamaican descent

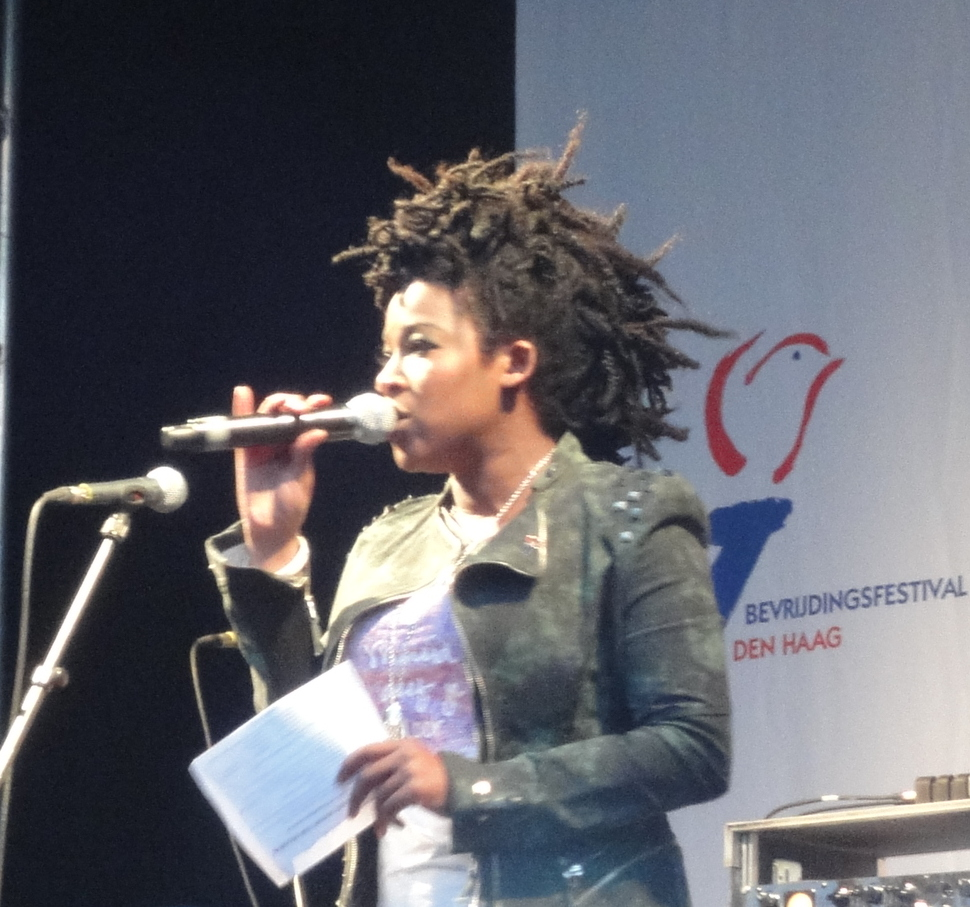
- Philippo during Bevrijdingsfestival (2012)

Background information
- Born: 6 September 1979 (age 46); Guelph, Canada
- Genres: Pop, R&B
- Occupations: Singer, songwriter
- Instruments: Vocals, piano
- Years active: 2001 – present
- Label: Lions Den Records
- Website: www.leonaphilippo.com

Leona Philippo (born 6 September 1979 in Guelph) is a Canadian-born Dutch singer-songwriter of Jamaican origin. On 14 December 2012, she won the title for season 3 of the Dutch reality television music competition The Voice of Holland. She is also often credited simply as Leona.

== Career ==
Born in Guelph, she started music very early learning the piano. When she was 6, she moved with her adoptive family to the Netherlands. In 1998, she recorded materials in Hollywood, Los Angeles made available as a demo. Later she moved back to Holland, to Rotterdam She also took part with R&B band Sat-R-Day performing at various locations including at the Rotterdam Ahoy. She left the band after three years.

Leaving the Conservatory after three years of studies, she joined band Nits as vocalist and toured with them in their Wool Tour in 2000 performing throughout Europe and in Japan.

In 2001, Philippo starred in Aida, a musical directed by Joop van den Ende. She also took part in a string of musical stage acts, notably Big, Black & Beautiful: A Tribute to the Girl Groups, and in A Tribute to The Blues Brothers.

In 2004–2005, she appeared in Dutch television series Het glazen huis in a leading role of Bibi Kruyswijk. She was also in backing vocals for a number of touring artists including Trijntje Oosterhuis, Total Touch, Kane and Candy Dulfer. In 2008, she also made guest appearances during Symphonica in Rosso concert of Lionel Richie.

In 2009, her single "Shake Ya Tailfeather" was promoted as Radio 501 favourite upcoming hit.

In 2011, she returned to musical stage theatre with A Tribute to Michael Jackson and in The Songs from the movie Sister Act. In 2012, she acted in the Dutch drama Lijn 32, Stars For Planet Earth and acted in the 2012 film release De groeten van Mike! as Laetitia Jurna after having appeared in a string of films and TV series in a variety of roles.

== In The Voice of Holland ==
In 2012, she auditioned for season 3 of the Dutch reality television music competition The Voice of Holland with the song "Mesmerized" on the first day of the blind auditions with all four judges, Marco Borsato, Trijntje Oosterhuis, Nick & Simon and Roel van Velzen pressing their "I Want You" buttons and turning their chairs. She chose to be part of Team Trijntje.

Progressing successfully through all rounds, in the final she sang "Could You Be Loved" winning with 54.6% of the public vote against runner up Johannes Rypma from Team Nick & Simon with 45.4% of the votes.

Performances

- Blind Audition: "Mesmerized" Result: Team Trijntje
- Battle round: "Always There" (facing Gerrie van Dijk-Dantuma). Result: To the live shows
- Live show 1: "I Just Want to Make Love to You" (full 10.0 from all four judges)
- Live show 3: "Livin' on a Prayer" (average 8.5 from the judges. To next round)
- Quarter finals: "Addicted to Love" (9.3 from judges. Total average 74.3. To next round)
- Semi-finals: "(You Make Me Feel Like) A Natural Woman" (9.3 from judges. Total average 129.1. Third best overall. To final)
- Final: "Could You Be Loved" (winner's song) / "Mesmerized" / "Knocked out" with coach Trijntje Oosterhuis. Result Winner of Voice of Holland with 54.6% of the popular votes

== After The Voice of Holland ==
After winning, she signed a contract with 8ball Music that released her winning song, a Bob Marley cover. Leona's release reached number 2 of the Dutch Top 40 charts and reached number 1 in Dutch Single Top 100 charts.

== Discography ==
=== Albums ===
Studio albums

- 2006: The Official Bootleg Volume 1
- 2009: Strut It!

Live albums

- 2010: Concert for Freedom

=== Singles ===
(Selective)

- 2002: "Zomer op je radio / Summer on Your Radio"
- 2006: "I'd Like to Teach the World to Sing"
- 2012: "Could You Be Loved" (Winning song in The Voice of Holland)

Other download releases from The Voice of Holland interpretations

- 2012: "Mesmerized"
- 2012: "I Just Want to Make Love to You"
- 2012: "Livin' on a Prayer"
- 2012: "Addicted to Love"

== Filmography ==
- 2003: Phileine Says Sorry Joanne
- 2005: Johan as Hester
- 2006: Wild Romance as Bombita 2
- 2006: Afdwalen (short film)
- 2007: Alles is Liefde
- 2008: Ver van familie as Filonia
- 2010: The Happy Housewife
- 2012: De groeten van Mike! as Laetitia Jurna

Television

- 2004–2005: Het Glazen Huis as Bibi Kruyswijk
- 2002–2012: Roles in various episodes of Trauma 24/7 (2002), Grijpstra & De Gier (2004), Man & Paard (2006, Verborgen Gebreken (2010), Lijn 32 (2012)

== Theater / Musical theater ==
- Sinbad the Sailor
- Wind in the Willow
- Little Miss Muffet
- Aida
- Big, Black & Beautiful
- Mussen & Zwanen
- MC Shake
- Helden (musical)
- Kings & Queens
- Stars for Planet Earth

Others

- Concert for Freedom
- The Official Tribute to the Blues Brothers
- Tribute to Michael Jackson
- Sister Act songs

Awards and achievements
Preceded by Iris Kroes	The Voice of Holland; Winner; 2012	Succeeded by Julia van der Toorn
