= Air (Agua de Annique album) =

Studio album by Agua de Annique
- Released: 30 October 2007
- Genre: Alternative rock, pop rock
- Length: 51:10
- Label: The End

Agua de Annique chronology
Air (2007)	Pure Air (2009)

Air is the debut album of the band Agua de Annique formed by the former The Gathering vocalist Anneke van Giersbergen. The album is a pop/rock oriented album and was released in 2007. Anneke van Giersbergen also plays piano on the album.

== Track listing ==
All tracks by Anneke van Giersbergen except where noted

1. "Beautiful One" – 4:43
2. "Witnesses" – 4:17
3. "Yalin" – 3:23
4. "Day After Yesterday" – 3:43
5. "My Girl" – 4:14
6. "Take Care of Me" – 2:43
7. "Ice Water" – 4:10
8. "You Are Nice!" – 3:16
9. "Trail of Grief" – 4:35
10. "Come Wander with Me" (Jeff Alexander) – 3:32
11. "Sunken Soldiers Ball" – 5:07
12. "Lost and Found" (Kristin Fjelltseth) – 5:15
13. "Asleep" – 2:30
14. "Notthemostprettygirl" (Bonus Track) – 3:14

There is an animated video of the song "Day After Yesterday" which can be viewed on their official site. There is also a video for the cover song "Come Wander with Me," which was released as a download-single in 2008.

== Personnel ==
- Anneke van Giersbergen – vocals, piano
- Joris Dirks – guitars, vocals
- Jacques de Haard – bass
- Rob Snijders – drums
