= Father & Friend =

Single by Alain Clark

from the album Live It Out
- B-side: "This Ain't Gonna Work (Live)"
- Released: 7 January 2008 (NL); 30 March 2009 (UK)
- Recorded: 2007
- Genre: Pop
- Length: 4:16
- Label: 8ball Music
- Songwriters: Alain Clark, Dane Clark
- Producer: Alain Clark

"Father & Friend" is a song by Dutch singer Alain Clark. It was released as the second single in the Netherlands and the first and only single in most European countries, from his second album Live It Out. It is a duet with his father Dane Clark.

== Charts ==
=== Weekly charts ===
Chart (2008)	Peak position
Italy (FIMI)	17
Netherlands (Dutch Top 40)	2
Netherlands (Single Top 100)	2
Switzerland (Schweizer Hitparade)	38
Poland (Polish Airplay Top 100)	47
UK Singles (Official Charts Company)	122

=== Year-end charts ===
Chart (2008)	Position
Netherlands (Dutch Top 40)	5
Netherlands (Single Top 100)	15
