= Van Velsen =

Van Velsen, Van Velzen, and Van Velze are Dutch toponymic surname referring to the town Velsen in North Holland. People with these surnames include:

Van Velsen

- Gerard van Velsen (died 1296), Dutch noble
- Jaap van Velsen (1921–1990), Dutch-born British anthropologist
- Jacob Jansz van Velsen (1597–1656), Dutch painter
- Koen van Velsen (born 1952), Dutch architect
- Ria van Velsen (1943–2025), Dutch backstroke swimmer
- Ria van Velsen (gymnast) (born 1939), Dutch gymnast
- Wilma van Velsen (born 1964), Dutch butterfly and freestyle swimmer

Van Velzen

- Bryony van Velzen (born 1996), Dutch racing cyclist
- Christiaan van Velzen (born 1932), Olympic shooter from the Netherlands
- Dick van Velzen, Dutch pathologist involved in the Alder Hey organs scandal
- Gyliano van Velzen (born 1994), Dutch football forward
- Ilse and Femke van Velzen (born 1980), Dutch documentary filmmakers
- Krista van Velzen (born 1974), Dutch politician
- Peter van Velzen (born 1958), Dutch footballer
- Roel van Velzen (born 1978), Dutch singer-songwriter better known as VanVelzen
- Wim van Velzen (born 1943), Dutch politician, CDA Party Chair 1987–1994

Van Velze

- Gerrit-Jan van Velze (born 1988), South African rugby player

Thoden van Velzen

- Bonno Thoden van Velzen (1933–2020), Dutch anthropologist, Surinamist and Africanist
