= Sharon Doorson =

Dutch singer-songwriter

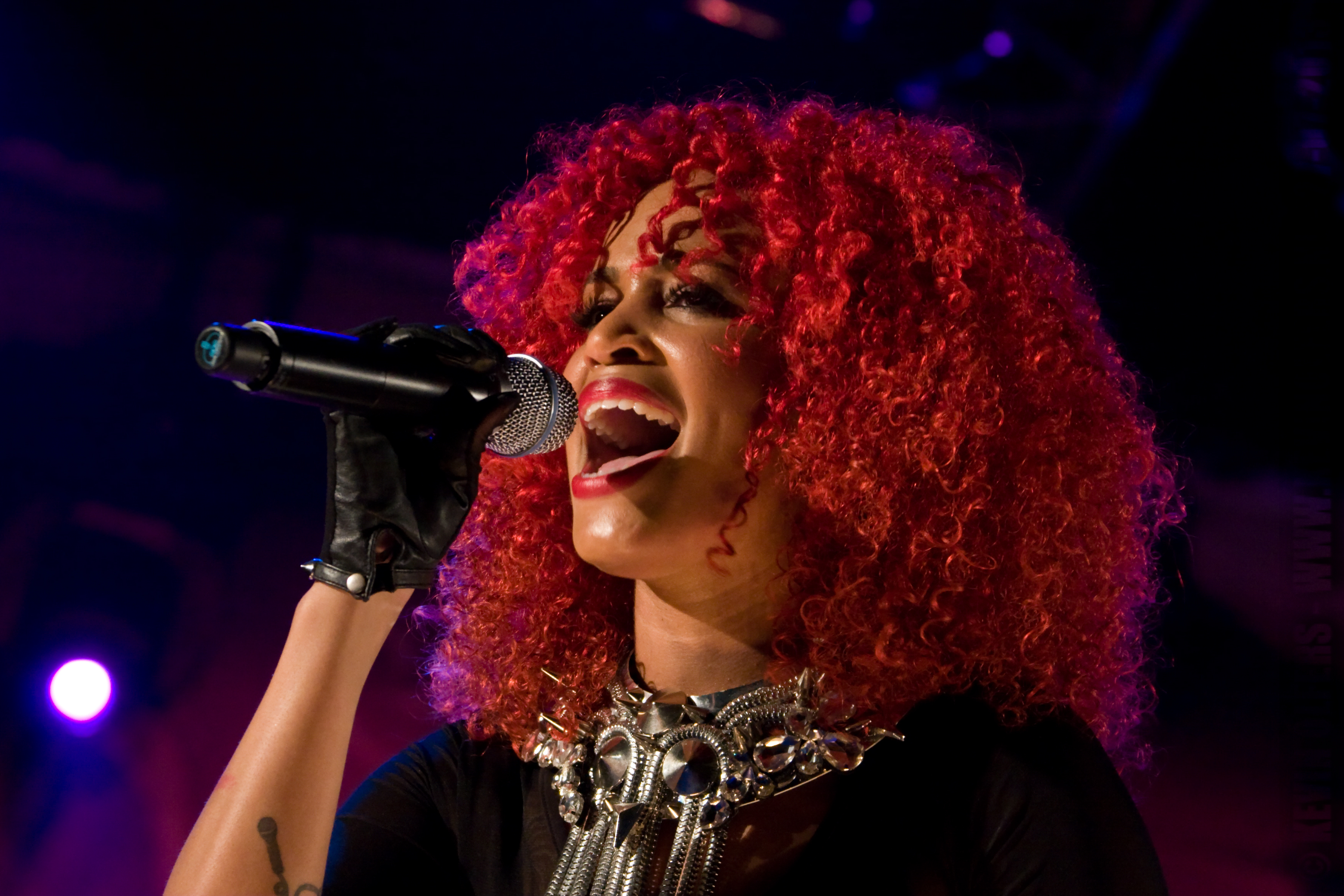

Background information
- Born: 24 April 1987 (age 39); Utrecht, Netherlands
- Genres: Pop, electronic dance, R&B
- Occupations: Singer-songwriter, dancer
- Instrument: Vocals
- Years active: 2004–present
- Label: 8ball Music
- Formerly of: Raffish
- Website: sharondoorsonworld.com

Sharon Doorson (born 24 April 1987, Netherlands) is a Dutch singer-songwriter, of Surinamese descent. She released her debut album in 2013, which reached the top 20 with 4 Top 40 singles released so far in Netherlands. She competed in The Voice of Holland having all four judges turn for her in the Blind-Audition. She was eliminated in Week 6 (the semi-finals).

== Early years ==
When Doorson was six years old, she won a playback show. In 2004 she was in a girl band, called Raffish (with Eva Simons). Raffish had a No. 1 hit in the Netherlands. The girlband separated ways in 2006, because all the girls wanted to go solo.

== Career ==
In 2011, Doorson participated in the Dutch TV program The Voice of Holland. In 2012, she released her first single, "Fail in Love". In 2013 she released her second single, high on your love (she got a Number 1 hit in Poland with this song), her third single, "Killer", which is also the title of her debut album, her fourth single "can't live without you" with Mischa Daniels and her fifth single "Run Run". On 14 March she released her new single, "Louder".

In 2015, Doorson decided she wanted to go another musical way, more pop instead of dance. She released 2 singles, "Electrify" and "Something Beautiful". In 2016 she followed up with the catchy How You Like It. She also successfully introduced the song Hold me now.

In 2017 Sharon Doorson gained popularity on YouTube in Brazil and Vietnam.

== Discography ==
=== Albums ===
| Year | Title | Peak |
| Year | Title | NET |
|---|---|---|
| 2005 | "How Raffish Are You? (as: Raffish)" | 10 |
| 2013 | "Killer" | 20 |

=== As lead artists ===
| Year | Title | Peak positions | | | | | | | Certifications |
| Year | Title | NET 40 | NET 100 | BE (FL) | BE (WA) | CH | FR | RUS | Certifications |
|---|---|---|---|---|---|---|---|---|---|
| 2012 | "Fail In Love" | 14 | 17 | — | — | 75 | — | — (Note: "Fail In Love" did reach number 230 on the Russian TopHit Charts. We only show the official top 100 positions in this graphic) | NET: Gold |
| 2013 | "High On Your Love" | 12 | 18 | — | — | — | 144 | — (Note: "High On Your Love" did reach number 220 on the Russian TopHit Charts. We only show the official top 100 positions in this graphic) | NET: Gold |
| 2013 | "Killer" | 25 | 38 | — | — | — | — | — (Note: "Killer" did reach number 213 on the Russian TopHit Charts. We only show the official top 100 positions in this graphic) | |
| 2013 | "Run Run" | 31 | 48 | — | — | — | — | — | |
| 2014 | "Louder" | 58 | 53 | — | — | — | — | — (Note: "Louder" did reach number 181 on the Russian TopHit Charts. We only show the official top 100 positions in this graphic) | |
| 2015 | "Electrify" | 51 | — | — | — | — | — | — | |
| 2015 | "Something Beautiful" | 35 | 110 | — | — | — | — | — | |
| 2015 | "Something Good (ft. Digitzz)" | — | — | — | — | — | — | — | |
| 2015 | "Dance Dance Dance" | — | — | — | — | — | — | — | |
| 2016 | "How You Like It" | 55 | — | — | — | — | — | — | |
| 2016 | "Touch Me There" | 52 | — | — | — | — | — | — | |
| 2016 | "You Know What" | — | — | — | — | — | — | — | |
| 2017 | "Jungle" | — | — | — | — | — | — | — | |
| 2017 | "Golden Trophy" | — | — | — | — | — | — | — | |
| 2017 | "Come To Me (ft. Rochelle & ROLLÀN)" | 57 | — | — | — | — | — | — | |
| 2017 | "I Got You (Kiss Me Under The Mistletoe)" | — | — | — | — | — | — | — | |
| 2018 | "Opinions" | 59 | — | — | — | — | — | — | |
| 2018 | "Drown In Love" | — | — | — | — | — | — | — | |
| 2018 | "One Of These Days" | — | — | — | — | — | — | — | |
| 2019 | "Peaches" | — | — | — | — | — | — | — | |

=== As featured artists ===
| Year | Title | Peak positions | | | | | | | Certifications |
| Year | Title | NET 40 | NET 100 | BE (FL) | BE (WA) | CH | FR | RUS | Certifications |
|---|---|---|---|---|---|---|---|---|---|
| 2004 | "Plaything (as: Raffish)" | 1 | 1 | — | — | — | — | — | NET: Gold |
| 2005 | "Als Je Iets Kan Doen (ft. Various Artists & as: Raffish)" | 1 | 1 | — | — | — | — | — | |
| 2005 | "Thursday's Child (as: Raffish)" | 38 | 28 | — | — | — | — | — | |
| 2005 | "Let Go (ft. Gio) (as: Raffish)" | 38 | 27 | — | — | — | — | — | |
| 2013 | "Koningslied (ft. Various Artists)" | 2 | 1 | 41 | — | — | — | — | |
| 2013 | "Can't Live Without You (ft. M. Daniels)" | 44 | — | — | — | — | — | — (Note: "Can't Live Without You" did reach number 238 on the Russian TopHit Charts. We only show the official top 100 positions in this graphic) | |
| 2013 | "I'm Over You (ft. Maison & Dragen)" | — | — | — | — | — | — | — | |
| 2014 | "Blijf Hangen (ft. Reverse & Jayh)" | 46 | — | — | — | — | — | — | |
| 2015 | "Feel Like Dancing (ft. Nils van Zandt)" | — | — | 42 | 46 | — | — | — | |
| 2017 | "We Fire It Up (ft. Loudgarden)" | — | — | — | — | — | — | — | |
| 2019 | "Mijn Kompas (ft. Jairzinho)" | — | — | — | — | — | — | — | |
| 2019 | "De Keuzes Die Je Maakt (Verspijkerd) (ft. Kempi)" | — | — | — | — | — | — | — | |

=== Other appearances ===
| Year | Title | Peak positions | | | | | | | Certifications |
| Year | Title | NET 40 | NET 100 | BE (FL) | BE (WA) | CH | FR | RUS | Certifications |
|---|---|---|---|---|---|---|---|---|---|
| 2011 | "Ain't No Other Man" | — | — | — | — | — | — | — | |
| 2012 | "I Have Nothing" | — | — | — | — | — | — | — | |
| 2012 | "We Found Love" | — | — | — | — | — | — | — | |
| 2012 | "Deeper Love" | — | — | — | — | — | — | — | |
| 2012 | "Paralized (ft. Iris Kroes)" | — | — | — | — | — | — | — | |
| 2016 | "Vision Of Love" | — | — | — | — | — | — | — | |
| 2016 | "Magic" | — | — | — | — | — | — | — | |
| 2016 | "Tuintje In Mijn Hart (ft. Brownie Dutch)" | — | — | — | — | — | — | — | |
| 2016 | "Hold Me Now" | — | — | — | — | — | — | — | |
| 2016 | "Een Wereld" | — | — | — | — | — | — | — | |
| 2016 | "Stay With Me" | — | — | — | — | — | — | — | |
