= Binghamite =

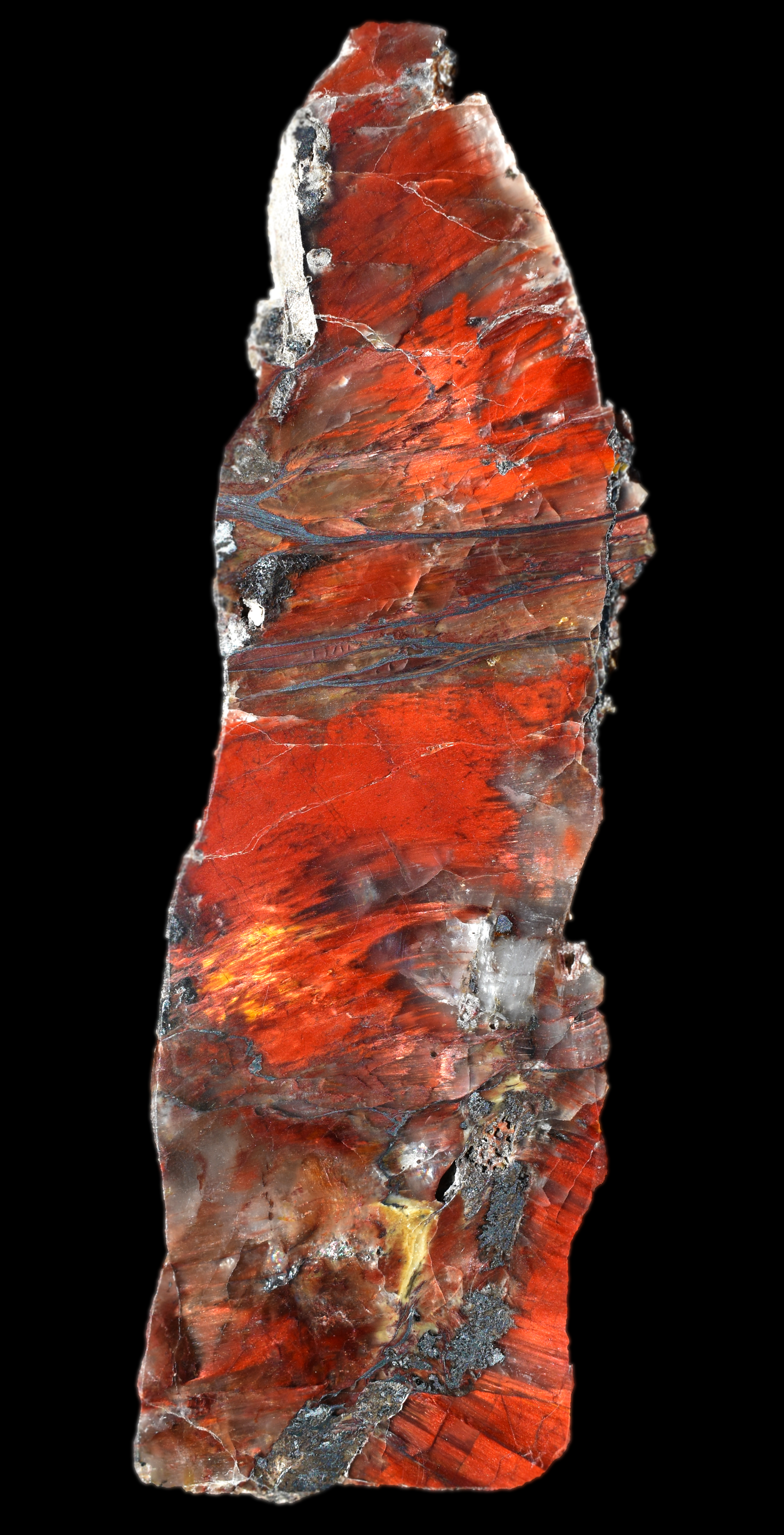
Binghamite

Binghamite (also called silkstone and cuyunite) is a type of chalcedony found only on the Cuyuna Range (near Crosby) in Crow Wing County, Minnesota. The stone occurs near deposits of iron ore.

== Description ==
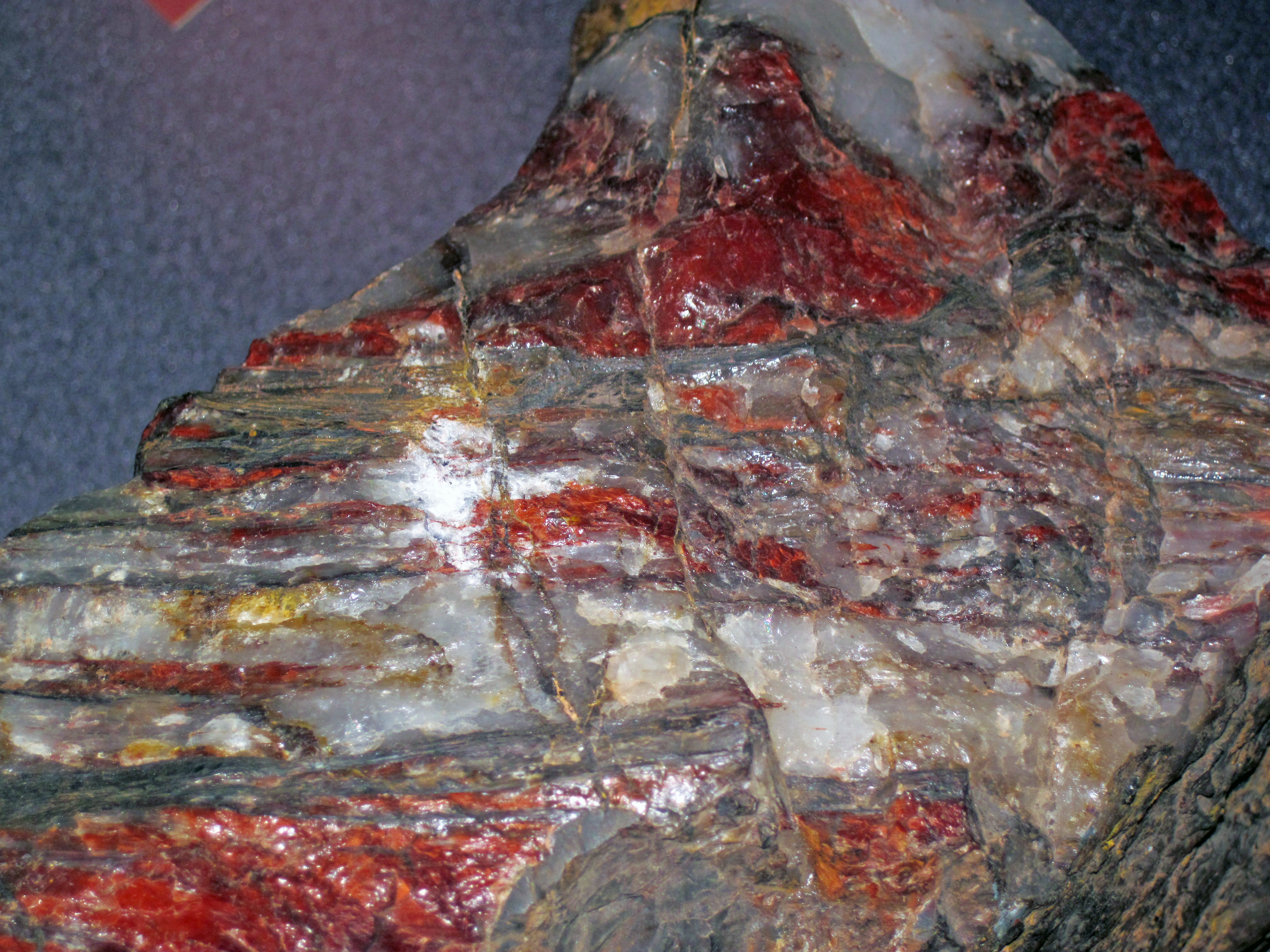
Binghamite, Cuyuna North Range, Minnesota, USA

Mining in the area uncovered deposits of the stone, but since mining operations were discontinued in the area many years ago the stone has become fairly rare. The stone has areas that are highly chatoyant similar to pietersite or tiger's eye. It is a variety of chalcedony with fibers of goethite or hematite usually in colors of red, gold, and black. The highest quality binghamite compares with pietersite for color and chatoyancy. When the stone's pattern is arranged in parallel bands it is called silkstone. Binghamite is named after William Bingham, a lapidarist, who discovered it in 1936.
