= Chaira Borderslee =

Dutch singer, actress and dancer

- Born: 1975 (age 50–51); Netherlands
- Occupations: Singer; actress; dancer

Chaira Borderslee (born 1975, in Alkmaar) is a Dutch singer, actress and dancer.

== Biography ==
Borderslee started singing on when she was five. She sang in the Antillean children's choir Zjozjoli, in which they made albums and children's films. She studied at the Nel Roos Ballet Academy and then followed the premiere and higher professional education training Showmusical at the Amsterdam Dance Academy Lucia Marthas. She grew up in Heiloo.

During her pre-tertiary education, Borderslee was seen as a singer and dancer in many well-known television programmes such as The Voice of Holland and The Next Pop Talent, by Joop van den Ende and John de Mol, in which she performed with celebrities like Barry White. In addition to her high school education, Borderslee also performed vocal studio work on the R&B duo Unknown. Later she was asked to sing at the Dutch-language R&B project Vogelvrij. With this ensemble they recorded an album, two singles and two video clips.

In her graduation year, she made the transition to musical and played in, among others, West Side Story, Miss Saigon, Fame, Aida, Hair and Tarzan. In Aida and Hair she performed key roles.

In 2017 she became a naked partner in the celebrity version of Adam Zkt. Eva.

== Theatre credits ==
Years	Title	Role	Notes	Ref.
1996–98	West Side Story	Anita (understudy)	Swing, ensemble	
1998–99	Miss Saigon	Gigi (understudy)	Swing, ensemble	
1999–2000	Fame	Carmen, Mabel and Miss Sherman (understudy)	Ensemble	
2001–03	Aida	Aida		
2005	Hair	Sheila		
2007–08	Tarzan	Kala		
2016	Goede tijden, slechte tijden	Meredith van Soest		
