= Alain Clark =

Dutch-Aruban musician and producer

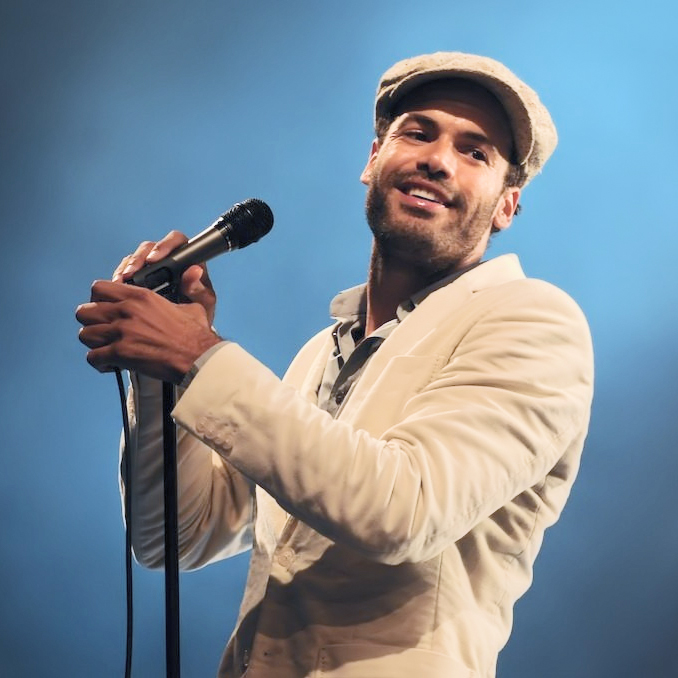
- Alain Clark in 2008

Background information
- Birth name: Alain Clark
- Born: 4 June 1979 (age 45)
- Origin: Haarlem, Netherlands
- Genres: Soul, pop
- Occupation: Singer
- Years active: 2004–present
- Labels: Concord Records, 8ball Music
- Website: www.alainclark.com

Alain Clark (born 4 June 1979) is a Dutch musician and producer.

== Biography ==
Alain Clark (born 4 June 1979), is a Dutch- Aruban singer, songwriter, and record producer. Alain's father is Dane Clark, a Dutch soul singer who had his own successful band Dane and the Dukes of Soul.

Alain blends pop melodies with his own natural R&B roots to write an organic, electric mix of music layered with infectious harmonies.

Alain released his debut record album in 2004, a self-titled album which featured the hit "Heerlijk". Alain wrote the music and produced the album with help from noted producers Fluitsma & Van Tijn. Alain wrote and produced music for Ali B, Simon, Men2B, and for Dutch TV shows including Idols, and Popstars: The Rivals and had his first #1 single with the song "Bigger Than That".

Alain's career took off with the release of his second album (and first English language album) in 2007, the award winning, Live It Out. Featuring Steve Gadd on drums, Live It Out has sold nearly 200,000 copies and contains the huge hit "Father and Friend", a duet with his father, Dane Clark. Alain released Colorblind in 2010, which entered the charts at #1 and went double platinum. Generation Love Revival followed in 2012, and Walk With Me in 2014.

== Discography ==
=== Albums ===
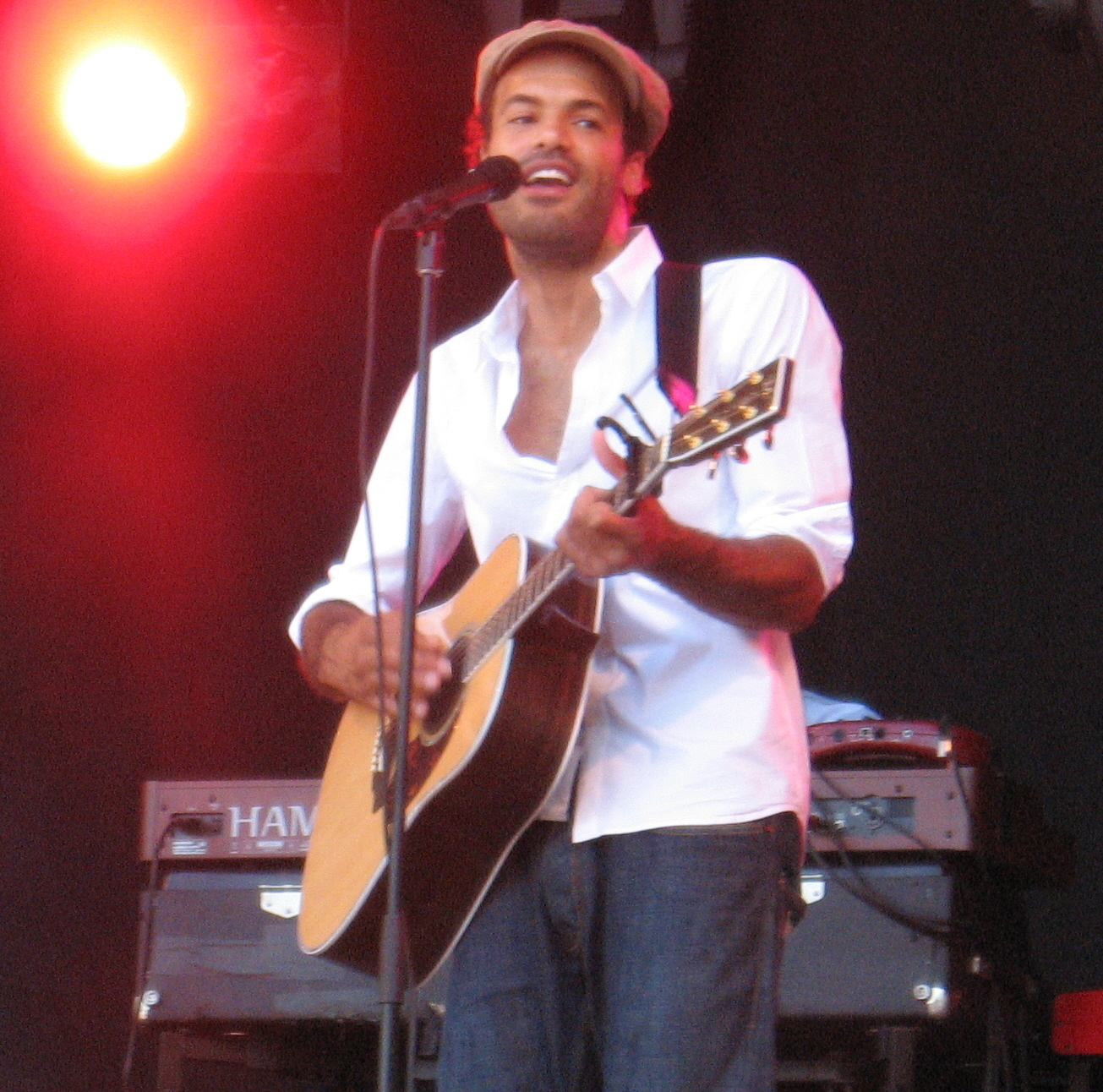
Alain Clark, Westerpop 2008

Studio albums

Year	Album	Peak positions		
Year	Album	NL	SWI	UK
2004	Alain Clark	—	—	—
2007	Live It Out	2	43	—
2010	Colorblind	1	24	—
2012	Generation Love Revival	5	—	—
2014	Walk With Me	3	—	—
2017	Bad Therapy	77	—	—
2020	Sunday Afternoon	93	—	—

Live albums

Year	Album	Peak positions
Year	Album	NL
2011	Live (with The Metropole Orchestra)	39

=== Singles ===
Year	Single	Peak positions						Album
Year	Single	NL Top 40	NL Top 100	SWI	ITA	POL	UK	Album
2004	"Heerlijk" (Lovely)	22	18	—	—	—	—	Alain Clark
2004	"Vrij" (Free)	—	43	—	—	—	—	Alain Clark
2004	"Ringtone"	—	32	—	—	—	—	Alain Clark
2007	"This Ain't Gonna Work"	3	11	—	—	—	—	Live It Out
2008	"Father & Friend"	2	2	38	17	47	122	Live It Out
2008	"Blow Me Away"	8	14	—	—	—	—	Live It Out
2008	"Fell in Love"	19	10	—	—	—	—	Live It Out
2009	"Hold On"	15	12	—	—	—	—	Live It Out
2010	"Love Is Everywhere"	15	2	—	—	—	—	Colorblind
2010	"For Freedom"	—	—	—	—	—	—	Colorblind
2010	"Good Days"	—	9	—	82	—	—	Colorblind
2010	"Too Soon to End" (with Diane Birch)	—	62	—	—	—	—	Colorblind
2010	"Dancing in the Street" (with Ben Saunders)	—	28	—	—	—	—	non-album single
2011	"Foxy Lady"	15	51	—	—	—	—	Colorblind
2011	"Wherever You Will Go" (with Jacqueline Govaert)	—	33	—	—	—	—	Colorblind
2012	"Let Some Air In"	33	38	—	—	—	—	Generation Love Revival
2012	"Nympho"	—	—	—	—	—	—	Generation Love Revival
2013	"Back in My World"	11	14	—	—	—	—	
2013	"Lose Ourselves"	—	88	—	—	—	—	
2014	"Change Will Come"	—	—	—	—	—	—	
