= Niels Geusebroek =

Dutch singer

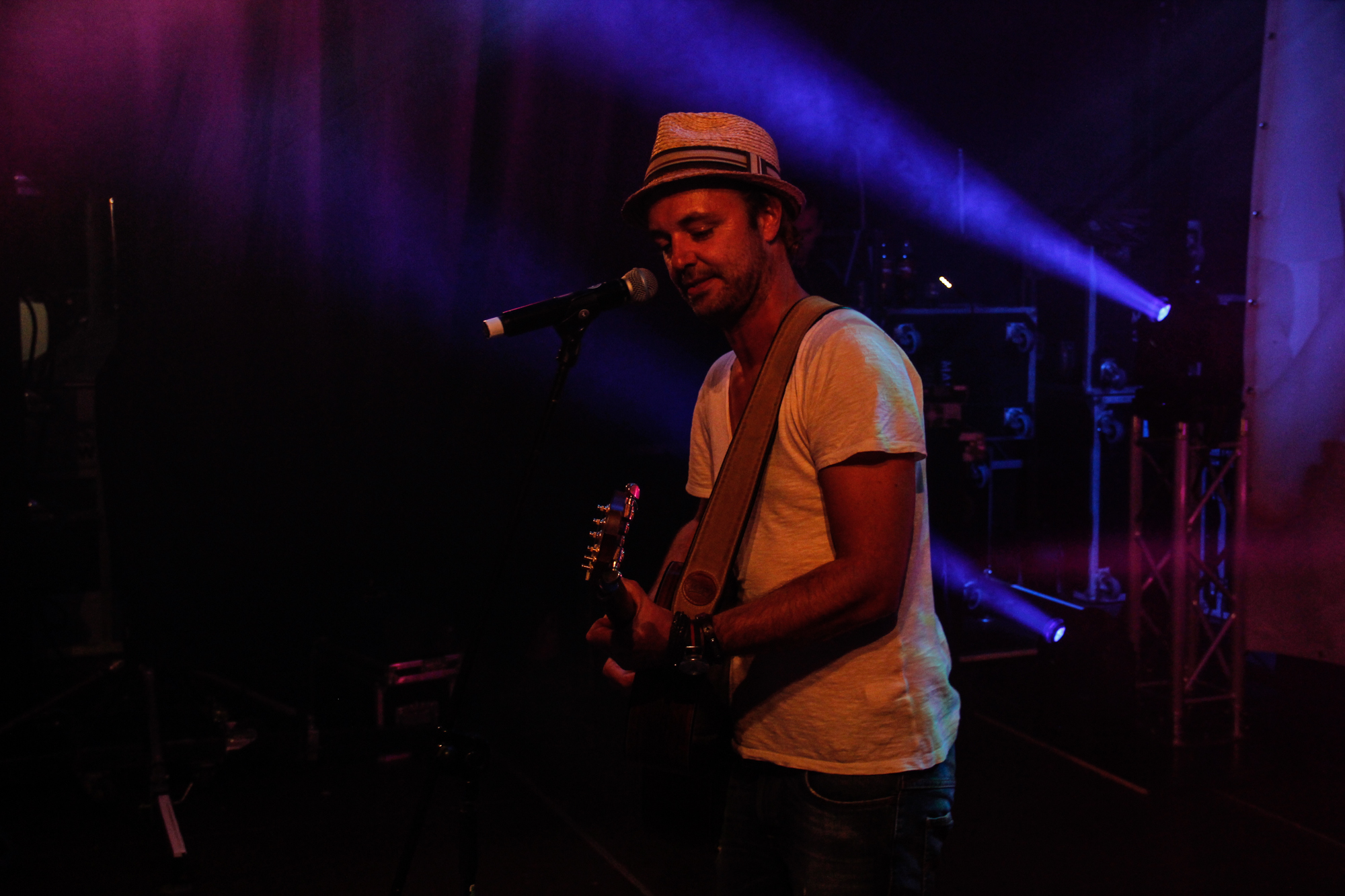
Niels Geusebroek during the Gouden Pijl in 2013

Niels Geusebroek (Dutch pronunciation: [nils ˈxøːsəbruk]; born 4 August 1979) is a Dutch singer and songwriter.

== In Silkstone ==
In 1996, he formed the Dutch pop group Silkstone becoming the vocalist of the band in partnership with guitar player Frans van Essen. There were many changes in line-up with various members that included earlier on Daniel van Luipen (bass), Paul van Twisk (keyboards), Boxie van Gerrisheim and Jeroen Vrolijk (drums). At later stages, the band was composed of Geusbroek and van Essen, in addition to the new line-up of Niels Bik (drums), Dave Besse (bass) and Marco Kuypers (keyboards). After initial success, the band signed with BMG releasing two albums, What's the Reason in 2003 and Here in Your World in 2008. Various hit singles by Silkstone included "Ready", "Rain Has Come" and "Blue X-mas" all in 2002, "What's the Reason" and "Lost" in 2003 and "Here in Your World" in 2008. He have also done a cover version of the British pop band Right Said Fred's song Don't Talk Just Kiss in 2013 in the Netherlands talkshow De Frank en Vrijdag Show. Silkstone also toured to US and Russia. The band broke up in 2009 after more than 13 years.

== In Voice of Holland ==
Geusebroek continued on a solo career, taking part in 2011 in the second season of The Voice of Holland as a contestant in Team Angela (Angela Groothuizen). During his run, three of his interpretations became minor hits appearing on the Dutch "Single Top 100" charts, namely for "Save the World", "Old and Wise" (an Alan Parsons project song) and "Titanium" (from David Guetta). He reached the semi-finals before getting eliminated in week 6 finishing in the 5th to 8th bracket.

== Solo career ==
In November 2012, he teamed up with Wildstylez with a massive hardstyle hit called "Year of Summer" where he was featured on the vocals of the popular dance hit and reaching #3 on Dutch Top 40. The single was certified gold in January 2013.

== Discography ==
=== Albums ===
As part of Silkstone

- 2003: What's the Reason (BMG, peaked NED #43 on Album Top 100)
- 2008: Here in Your World (BMG, peaked NED #36 on Album Top 100)

=== Singles ===
as part of Silkstone

- 2002: "Ready" (peaked at #40 on Dutch Top 40)
- 2003: "What's the Reason" (reaching Tip 3 just below the Top 40)
- 2008: "Here in Your World" (peaked at #36 on Dutch Top 40)

Solo, during The Voice of Holland

Year	Single	Original by	Chart peak NED Single Top 100
2010	"Save the World"	Swedish House Mafia	66
2010	"Cold and Rice"	Alan Parsons Project	13
2010	"Titanium"	David Guetta featuring Sia	23

featured in

Year	Single	Chart peak NED Dutch Top 40
2012	"Year of Summer"	3

=== Duets ===
- 2016: "All I want" (with Sam Bettens)
