= The Gathering discography =

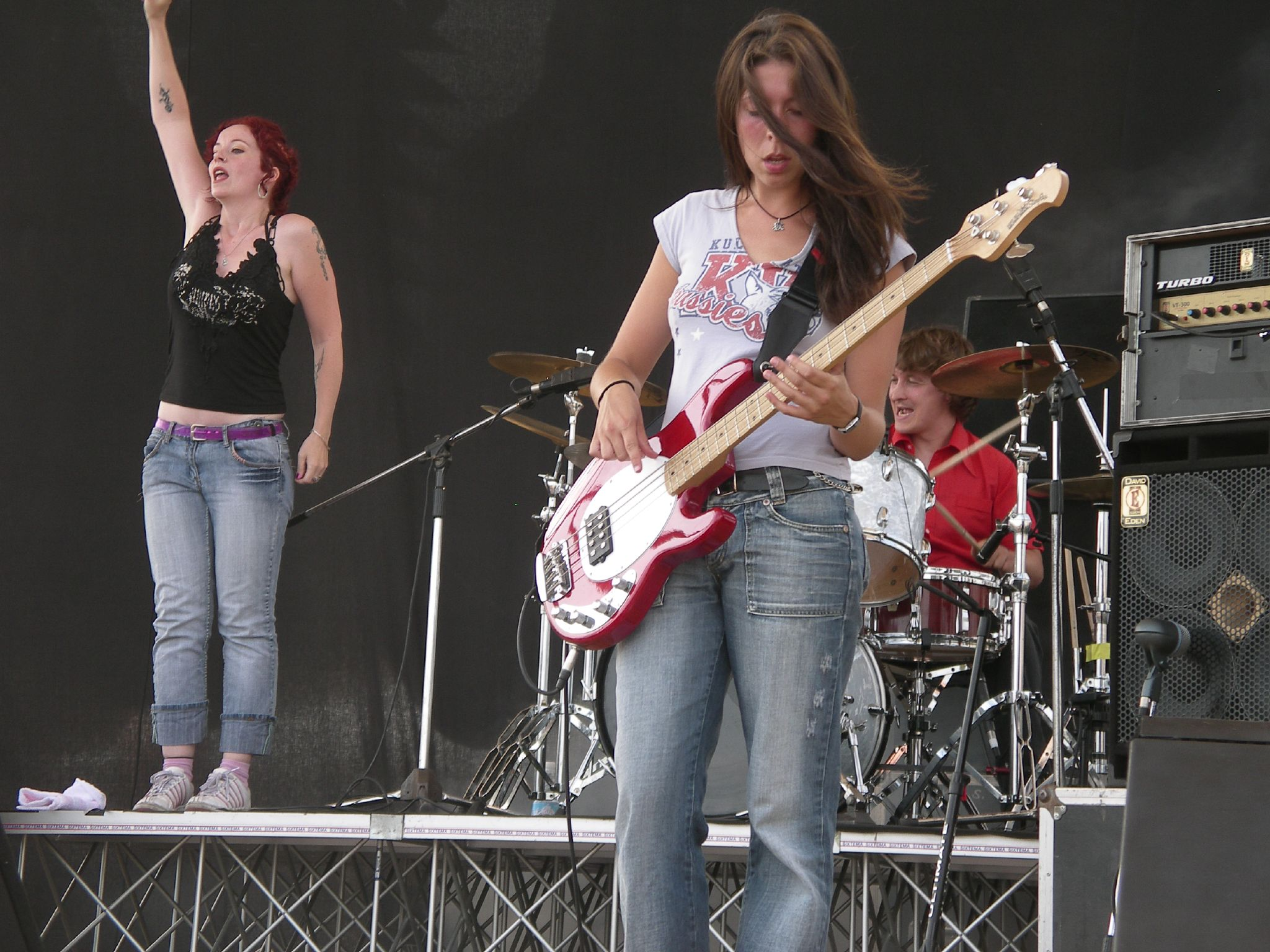
The Gathering in 2006

This is the discography for Dutch rock band The Gathering.

== Studio albums ==
Title	Album details	Peak chart positions				
Title	Album details	NLD	GER	FRA	FIN	BEL (WA)
Always...	Released: 9 June 1992; Label: Foundation 2000; Formats: CD, CS, LP, digital download	—	—	—	—	—
Almost a Dance	Released: September 1993; Label: Foundation 2000; Formats: CD, CS, digital download	—	—	—	—	—
Mandylion	Released: 28 August 1995; Label: Century Media Records; Formats: CD, CS, LP, digital download	20	—	—	—	—
Nighttime Birds	Released: 15 May 1997; Label: Century Media Records; Formats: CD, CS, LP, digital download	12	80	—	32	—
How to Measure a Planet?	Released: 9 November 1998; Label: Century Media Records; Formats: CD, CS, LP, digital download	45	99	—	—	—
if then else	Released: 3 July 2000; Label: Century Media Records; Formats: CD, CS, LP, digital download	47	76	—	—	—
Souvenirs	Released: 24 February 2003; Label: Psychonaut Records; Formats: CD, CS, LP, digital download	47	90	—	—	—
Home	Released: 15 April 2006; Label: Noise/The End; Formats: CD, LP, digital download	34	—	58	—	—
The West Pole	Released: 4 May 2009; Label: Psychonaut Records; Formats: CD, LP, digital download	98	—	—	—	—
Disclosure	Released: 12 September 2012; Label: Psychonaut Records; Formats: CD, LP, digital download	—	—	—	—	146
Afterwords	Released: 5 October 2013; Label: Psychonaut Records; Formats: CD, LP	—	—	—	—	—
Beautiful Distortion	Released: 29 April 2022; Label: Psychonaut Records; Formats: CD, LP, digital download	—	—	—	—	—
"—" denotes a recording that did not chart or was not released in that territory.

== Live albums ==
Title	Album details	Peak chart positions		
Title	Album details	NLD	GER	FRA
Superheat	Released: 25 January 2000; Label: Century Media Records; Formats: CD, CS, LP, digital download	88	—	—
Sleepy Buildings – A Semi Acoustic Evening	Released: 26 January 2004; Label: Century Media Records; Formats: CD, LP, digital download	66	91	93
A Noise Severe	Released: 31 October 2007; Label: Psychonaut Records; Formats: CD, digital download	—	—	—
TG25: Live at Doornroosje	Released: 27 November 2015; Label: Psychonaut Records; Formats: CD, digital download	—	—	—
"—" denotes a recording that did not chart or was not released in that territory.

== Compilations ==
Title	Album details	Peak chart positions
Title	Album details	NLD
Downfall – The Early Years	Released: 22 May 2001; Label: Hammerheart Records; Formats: CD, LP, digital download	—
Accessories – Rarities and B-Sides	Released: 22 August 2005; Label: Century Media Records; Formats: CD, LP, digital download	73
Sand and Mercury	Released: 25 January 2008; Label: Century Media Records; Formats: CD (Box set)	—
TG25: Diving Into the Unknown	Released: 26 January 2015; Label: Psychonaut Records; Formats: CD (Box set), Digital Download	—
Blueprints	Released: 3 February 2017; Label: Psychonaut Records; Formats: 2 x CD	—
"—" denotes a recording that did not chart or was not released in that territory.

== Video albums ==
Title	Album details	Peak chart positions
Title	Album details	NLD
In Motion	Released: 28 October 2002; Label: Century Media Records; Formats: DVD	—
A Sound Relief	Released: October 2005; Label: Psychonaut Records; Formats: DVD	29
A Noise Severe	Released: 31 October 2007; Label: Psychonaut Records; Formats: DVD	—
"—" denotes a recording that did not chart or was not released in that territory.

== Singles ==
Title	Year	Peak chart positions		Album
Title	Year	NLD	FIN	Album
"Strange Machines"	1995	37	—	Mandylion
"Adrenaline/Leaves"	1996	—	—	Mandylion
"The May Song"	1997	—	17	Nighttime Birds
"Kevin's Telescope"	1997	—	—	Nighttime Birds
"Liberty Bell"	1998	—	—	How to Measure a Planet?
"Rollercoaster"	2000	—	—	if_then_else
"Amity"	2000	—	—	if_then_else
"You Learn About It"	2003	—	—	Souvenirs
"Monsters"	2003	—	—	Souvenirs
"Alone"	2006	—	—	Home
"—" denotes a recording that did not chart or was not released in that territory.

== EPs ==
Title	Demo details
Black Light District	Released: 17 June 2002; Label: Psychonaut Records; Formats: CD, LP, digital download
City from Above	Released: 4 May 2009; Label: Psychonaut Records; Formats: CD
A Sound Relief	Released: 27 October 2010; Label: Psychonaut Records; Formats: CD
Afterlights	Released: 12 September 2012; Label: Psychonaut Records; Formats: CD
Interference	Released: 29 April 2022; Label: Psychonaut Records; Formats: CD, LP

== Demos ==
Title	Demo details
An Imaginary Symphony	Released: 1990; Label: Self-released; Formats: CS
Moonlight Archer	Released: 1991; Label: Self-released; Formats: CS
Promo '92	Released: 1992; Label: Self-released; Formats: CS

== Music videos ==
Year	Title	Directed	Album
1992	"King for a Day"	—	Always…
1995	"Leaves"	—	Mandylion
1995	"Strange Machines"	—	Mandylion
1995	"In Motion #2"	—	Mandylion
1998	"Liberty Bell"	-	How to Measure a Planet?
1998	"My Electricity"	Hans Nagtegaal	How to Measure a Planet?
2000	"Eléanor"	—	Superheat (live) originally on Mandylion
2000	"Life's What You Make It"	—	Amity (single)
2003	"Monsters"	Lorenzo Bonicontro	Souvenirs
2003	"You Learn About It"	—	Souvenirs
2007	"Forgotten"	—	Home
2007	"Alone"	Lorenzo Bonicontro	Home
2009	"All You Are"	—	The West Pole
2010	"No Bird Call"	—	The West Pole
2011	"Heroes for Ghosts"	Marcus Moonen	Disclosure
2013	"Echoes Keep Growing"	—	Afterwords
