= Downfall (The Gathering album) =

2001 compilation album by The Gathering

Downfall – The Early Years

Compilation album by The Gathering
- Released: 22 May 2001
- Recorded: 1990, 1991
- Genre: Death-doom, gothic metal
- Length: 69:59
- Label: Hammerheart Records
- Producer: Han Swagerman Sr. and The Gathering

The Gathering chronology
if then else (2000)	Downfall – The Early Years (2001)	Souvenirs (2003)

Professional ratings
Review scores
Source	Rating
AllMusic	(not rated)

Downfall – The Early Years is a compilation album of by the Dutch rock band The Gathering. The record was first released on 22 May 2001 by the Hammerheart Records label. On 15 September 2008, an expanded version of the album was released by Vic Records.

== Track listing ==
All lyrics are written by Bart Smits; all music is composed by The Gathering.

Original 2001 Release
No.	Title	Length
1.	"In Sickness and Health" (Unreleased 7-inch)	7:26
2.	"Gaya's Dream" (Unreleased 7-inch)	6:23
3.	"Always…" (Unreleased 7-inch)	2:30
4.	"Subzero" (Moonlight Archer demo)	6:21
5.	"Anthology in Black" (Moonlight Archer demo)	3:48
6.	"Second Sunrise" (Moonlight Archer demo)	6:50
7.	"Downfall" (Moonlight Archer demo)	6:03
8.	"In Sickness and Health" (Moonlight Archer demo)	6:45
9.	"Second Sunrise" (An Imaginary Symphony demo)	6:48
10.	"Six Dead, Three to Go" (An Imaginary Symphony demo)	4:04
11.	"Downfall" (An Imaginary Symphony demo)	5:21
12.	"Another Day" (An Imaginary Symphony demo)	3:14
13.	"Share the Wisdom" (An Imaginary Symphony demo)	4:14

Bonus MPEG Video Disc
No.	Title	Length
1.	"Live at Willem II, Den Bosch, 1991"	53:55

== Credits ==
- Bart Smits – all vocals
- Jelmer Wiersma – guitar
- René Rutten – guitar
- Hans Rutten – drums
- Frank Boeijen – keyboards
- Hugo Prinsen Geerligs – bass

=== Songwriting ===
- All music by The Gathering.
- All lyrics by Bart Smits.

=== Production ===
- [3] Unreleased 7-inch EP 1991. Recorded at Beaufort Studios, the Netherlands. Produced by the Gathering and Han Swagerman Sr.
- [2] Moonlight Archer demo, recorded live at the Caveman Studio, the Netherlands on 1 April 1991. Assisted by Johan. Produced by the Gathering
- [1] An Imaginary Symphony demo. Recorded at the rehearsal room, Oss, the Netherlands, 18 October 1990. Assisted by Johan and Ralph. Produced by the Gathering

== 2008 reissue ==
Downfall

Compilation album by The Gathering
- Released: 15 September 2008
- Recorded: 1990–1993
- Genre: Death-doom, gothic metal, doom metal
- Length: 144:06
- Label: Vic Records
- Producer: Han Swagerman Sr. and The Gathering

The Gathering chronology
Home (2006)	Downfall (2008)	The West Pole (2009)

Professional ratings
Review scores
Source	Rating
Allmusic	

All lyrics are written by Bart Smits; all music is composed by The Gathering.

Disc 1
No.	Title	Length
1.	"Heartbeat Amplifier" (1992 Promo demo)	4:56
2.	"Her Last Flight" (1992 Promo demo)	8:09
3.	"On A Wave" (1992 Promo demo)	5:28
4.	"The Illusionist" (1992 Promo demo)	4:29
5.	"Passage to Desire" (1992 Promo demo)	4:49
6.	"Of Pavilions and Fountains" (1992 Promo demo)	3:33
7.	"In Sickness and Health" (Unreleased 7-inch)	7:26
8.	"Gaya's Dream" (Unreleased 7-inch)	6:23
9.	"Always…" (Unreleased 7-inch)	2:30
10.	"Second Sunrise" (An Imaginary Symphony demo)	6:48
11.	"Six Dead, Three To Go" (An Imaginary Symphony demo)	4:04
12.	"Downfall" (An Imaginary Symphony demo)	5:21
13.	"Another Day" (An Imaginary Symphony demo)	3:14
14.	"Share The Wisdom" (An Imaginary Symphony demo)	4:14

Disc 2
No.	Title	Length
1.	"Dethroned Emperor" (Celtic Frost cover)	4:12
2.	"Subzero" (Moonlight Archer demo)	6:21
3.	"Anthology In Black" (Moonlight Archer demo)	3:48
4.	"Second Sunrise" (Moonlight Archer demo)	6:50
5.	"Downfall" (Moonlight Archer demo)	6:03
6.	"In Sickness and Health" (Moonlight Archer demo)	6:45
7.	"Anthology In Black" (Live)	3:02
8.	"Downfall" (Live)	5:33
9.	"Subzero" (Live)	6:44
10.	"Second Sunrise" (Live)	7:06
11.	"Gaya's Dream" (Live)	6:16
12.	"Stonegarden" (Live)	4:58
13.	"Heartbeat Amplifier" (Live)	5:11

=== Production ===
- [demo] The 1992 Promo demo. Recorded at Popkollektief Oss, the Netherlands, Autumn 1992. Produced by the Gathering
- [3] Unreleased 7-inch EP 1991. Recorded at Beaufort Studios, the Netherlands. Produced by the Gathering and Han Swagerman Sr.
- [1] An Imaginary Symphony demo. Recorded at the rehearsal room, Oss, the Netherlands, 18 October 1990. Assisted by Johan and Ralph. Produced by the Gathering
- Dethroned Emperor written by Celtic Frost. Previously unreleased. Live recorded on 18 October 1990. Assisted by Johan and Ralph. Produced by the Gathering
- [2] Moonlight Archer demo, recorded live at the Caveman Studio, the Netherlands on 1 April 1991. Assisted by Johan. Produced by the Gathering
- [live] the Gathering live 1991–1993:
  - Live 19 October 1991 @ de Zon, Bodegraven, the Netherlands
  - Live 22 February 1992 @ Burgerweeshuis, Deventer, the Netherlands
  - Live 30 January 1993 @ Ekke, Utrecht, the Netherlands
  - Live 8 April 1993 @ Pinguin Club, Tel Aviv, Israel
