= Beautiful Distortion =

Studio album by the Gathering
- Released: 29 April 2022
- Genre: Alternative rock
- Length: 48:16
- Label: Psychonaut
- Producer: Attie Bauw

The Gathering chronology
Afterwords (2013)	Beautiful Distortion (2022)	Interference (2022)

Singles from Beautiful Distortion
- 1. "In Colour" Released: 13 October 2021; 2. "We Rise" Released: 9 February 2022

Professional ratings
Review scores
Source	Rating
Sputnikmusic	4.0/5.0

Beautiful Distortion is the eleventh (Note: It is reported here as their 11th album because the band consider it as such, with Afterwords being more like an EP. States drummer Hans Rutten, "We all see Disclosure as our last studio album, and Afterwords was more or less a Disclosure after-party... It's a mini album, maybe, but it's a long album. But that said, we don't see it as a full-length album of The Gathering, more as sort of an EP kind of thing.") album by Dutch rock band the Gathering. It was released on 29 April 2022 via the Gathering's imprint Psychonaut Records. It is their first full-length album in over nine years, after the band took an hiatus in 2014, and their first to feature the band's founding bassist Hugo Prinsen Geerligs since their 2003 effort Souvenirs. He replaced Marjolein Kooijman, who played bass for the band between 2004 and 2014. It is also their last album to feature vocalist Silje Wergeland who left the band in 2025.

== Background ==
The band had first announced that they were recording an album in February 2021, when they had shared pictures from inside the studio.

Attie Bauw, the producer of this album, had also previously produced the Gathering's albums How to Measure a Planet? and Home.

The album's first single, "In Colour", was released on 13 October 2021. This was followed by their second single "We Rise", released via a music video on 9 February 2022. At 4:33, the music video is shorter than the "single edit" version of the song posted on their Bandcamp page.

On the same day of Beautiful Distortion's release, an EP titled Interference, is also being released, which is meant as a companion piece to the album. A music video for the EP's song "Stronger" was released in December 2021.

Following the release, the Gathering will perform concerts for AutoReverse: 30th Anniversary Tour, which includes four dates in the Netherlands, three in Mexico, and one each in Colombia, Bolivia, Chile and Brazil.

== Track listing ==
All lyrics by Silje Wergeland

No.	Title	Music	Length
1.	"In Colour"	Frank Boeijen	5:49
2.	"When We Fall"	Frank Boeijen	5:23
3.	"Grounded"	René Rutten	6:52
4.	"We Rise"	René Rutten	6:47
5.	"Black Is Magnified"	René Rutten	6:19
6.	"Weightless"	Frank Boeijen	5:50
7.	"Pulse of Life"	Hugo Prinsen Geerligs	6:44
8.	"On Delay"	René Rutten	4:30

== Personnel ==
The Gathering

- Silje Wergeland – vocals
- Frank Boeijen – keyboards and piano
- Hugo Prinsen Geerligs – bass, guitar, keyboards, piano, percussion
- René Rutten – guitars, keyboards, percussion
- Hans Rutten – drums, percussion

Production

- Attie Bauw – production
- Studio Captain – artwork
- Maor Appelbaum – mastering
