= City from Above =

EP by The Gathering
- Released: 3 May 2009
- Genre: Alternative rock, post-rock, shoegaze
- Length: 30:38
- Label: Psychonaut Records
- Producer: René Rutten

The Gathering chronology
The West Pole (2009)	City from Above (2009)	Disclosure (2012)

City from Above (2009) is a mini-album by the Dutch rock band The Gathering. It is limited to 2,000 copies.

The song "Miniature" uses samples from the 1963 "The Twilight Zone" TV-series, episode 8, also called "Miniature". Around the 2 minute and 40 seconds mark of the song, dialogue from the episode can be heard.

== Track listing ==
No.	Title	Lyrics	Music	Length
1.	"Treasure (Radio Edit)"	Silje Wergeland	René Rutten	3:17
2.	"All You Are (Radio Edit)"	Silje Wergeland	René Rutten	3:22
3.	"Miniature"	Marcela Bovio	Frank Boeijen	6:22
4.	"Pale Traces (Alternate Spanish Version)"	Marcela Bovio	Frank Boeijen	4:47
5.	"City from Above (Modern Dance Project)"	Instrumental	Frank Boeijen, René Rutten	12:53

== Credits ==
- Lyrics by – Marcela Bovio (tracks: 3, 4), Silje Wergeland (tracks: 1, 2)
- Mastered by – Paul Matthijs Lombert (tracks: 3, 4, 5), René Rutten (tracks: 1, 2), Zlaya Hadzich (tracks: 1, 2)
- Mixed by – René Rutten, Zlaya Hadzich (tracks: 1, 2)
- Producer – René Rutten
