= Silje Wergeland =

Norwegian singer, songwriter and pianist

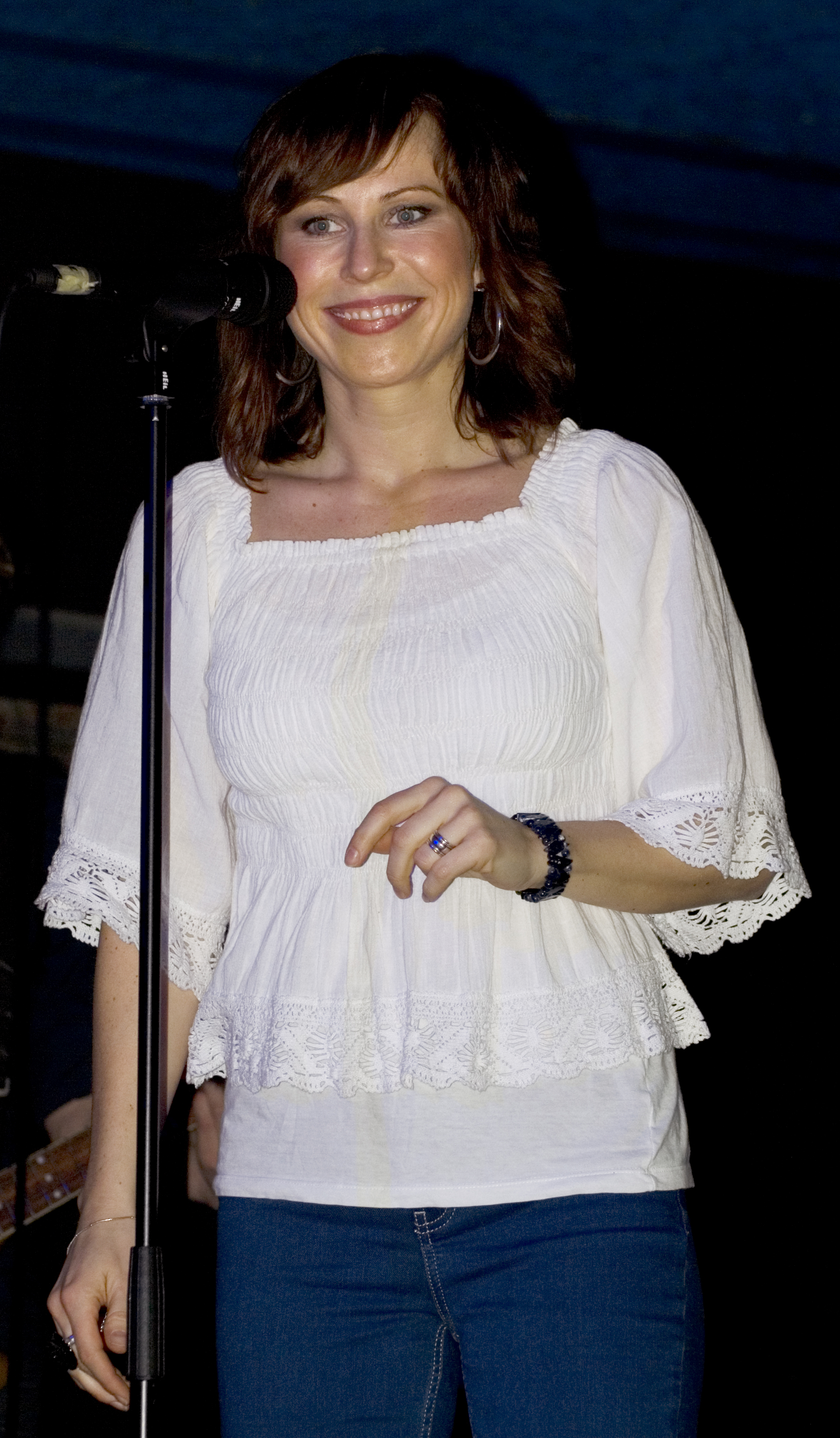
- Silje Wergeland in Budapest, 2010

Background information
- Born: Silje Wergeland; 9 November 1974 (age 51); Bergen, Hordaland, Norway
- Occupations: Vocalist, singer-songwriter, lyricist
- Instruments: Vocals, piano, keyboards
- Years active: 2000–present
- Formerly of: The Gathering

Silje Wergeland (born 9 November 1974) is a Norwegian singer, songwriter and pianist. She is best known as the former lead vocalist of the Dutch progressive/alternative rock band The Gathering (2009 - 2025). She was also the frontwoman of Norwegian doom/gothic metal band Octavia Sperati.

== Musical career ==
Silje Wergeland was a founding member of the female group of gothic / doom metal Octavia Sperati in 2000, where she remained as vocalist and one of the main songwriters along with Gyri Losnegaard and Bodil Myklebust, until 2008. In an interview with Paul Stenning, Wergeland described the band as “Extravagant, dramatic doom with a rock n’ roll heart.” She also said her influences were “Black Sabbath, Slayer, Clutch, Pantera, Type O Negative, Pink Floyd among others, and also some Norwegian folk music influences due to our musical inheritance.”

On 10 March 2009, it was announced that singer Wergeland joined the Dutch rock band The Gathering, replacing singer Anneke van Giersbergen, who left to form her band Agua de Annique.

Her first studio album with The Gathering, The West Pole was released in May 2009.

== Personal life ==
Wergeland was born in Bergen, where she still regularly lives. Her partner is Mads Lilletvedt, drummer of the death / thrash metal local band Hellish Outcast and Sahg. They are the parents of two girls: Marie, born in August 2012 and Louise, born in February 2016.

== Discography ==
=== With Octavia Sperati ===
- Guilty (demo, (2002)
- Winter Enclosure (2005)
- ...and Then the World Froze (single, 2007)
- Grace Submerged (2007)

=== With The Gathering ===
- The West Pole (2009)
- City from Above (EP, 2009)
- Heroes for Ghosts (Single, 2011)
- Meltdown (Single, 2012)
- Disclosure (2012)
- Afterlights (EP, 2012)
- Echoes Keep Growing (Single, 2013)
- Afterwords (2013)
- Beautiful Distortion (2022)
