= Accessories (album) =

Accessories – Rarities and B-Sides

Compilation album by The Gathering
- Released: 22 August 2005
- Recorded: 1995–2000
- Genre: Progressive metal, alternative rock, experimental rock
- Length: 144:14
- Label: Century Media
- Producer: Siggi Bemm, Waldemar Sorychta, and The Gathering

Accessories – Rarities and B-Sides is a compilation album by Dutch alternative rock band The Gathering. The album was released on 22 August 2005 by Century Media. The album features B-sides and demos the group released from 1995 to 2000 while with Century Media. The first disc is compiled from B-Sides taken from The Gathering's out-of-print single releases, whilst the second disc is composed of demo recordings from the albums Nighttime Birds and How to measure a planet?. Included are such rarities as their cover versions of Talk Talk, Dead Can Dance and Slowdive.

== Track listing ==
Disc 1 – B-Sides
No.	Title	Original Release	Length
1.	"In Motion No. 1" (live)	Strange Machines single	7:54
2.	"Leaves" (live)	Strange Machines single	6:15
3.	"Adrenaline"	Adrenaline/Leaves single	4:13
4.	"Third Chance" (alternate version)	Adrenaline/Leaves single	5:35
5.	"Strange Machines" (live with orchestra)	The May Song single	6:51
6.	"In Power We Trust the Love Advocated" (Dead Can Dance cover)	Kevin's Telescope single	4:04
7.	"When the Sun Hits" (Slowdive cover)	Kevin's Telescope single	4:51
8.	"Confusion" (demo/EROC session)	Kevin's Telescope single	7:16
9.	"Shrink" (Alternate Version)	Liberty Bell single	2:13
10.	"Frail" (live)	Liberty Bell single	3:58
11.	"Theme from 'The Cyclist'"	Rollercoaster Single	3:21
12.	"Leaves" (live with orchestra)	Rollercoaster single	4:11
13.	"Life's What You Make It" (Talk Talk cover)	Amity single	4:52
14.	"Amity" (live at Isabelle)	Amity single	6:11

Disc 2 – Rarities
No.	Title	Length
1.	"New Moon, Different Day" (Demo/EROC Session)	6:17
2.	"Kevin's Telescope" (Demo/EROC Session)	4:47
3.	"Shrink" (Demo/EROC Session)	3:59
4.	"The Earth Is My Witness" (Demo/EROC Session)	6:08
5.	"Diamond Box" (Demo/EROC Session)	4:41
6.	"Nighttime Birds" (Demo/EROC Session)	7:01
7.	"On Most Surfaces" (Demo/EROC Session)	7:30
8.	"Hjelmar's" (Demo/EROC Session)	1:35
9.	"My Electricity" (Demo)	3:03
10.	"Probably Built in the Fifties" (Demo)	8:25
11.	"Illuminating" (Demo)	5:27
12.	"Red Is a Slow Colour" (Demo)	6:08
13.	"Travel" (Demo)	7:28

== Personnel ==
- Anneke van Giersbergen – lead vocals/guitars
- René Rutten – guitars/flute
- Jelmer Wiersma – guitars
- Frank Boeijen – keyboards
- Hugo Prinsen Geerligs – bass
- Hans Rutten – drums
