= René Rutten =

Dutch guitarist for The Gathering (born 1972)

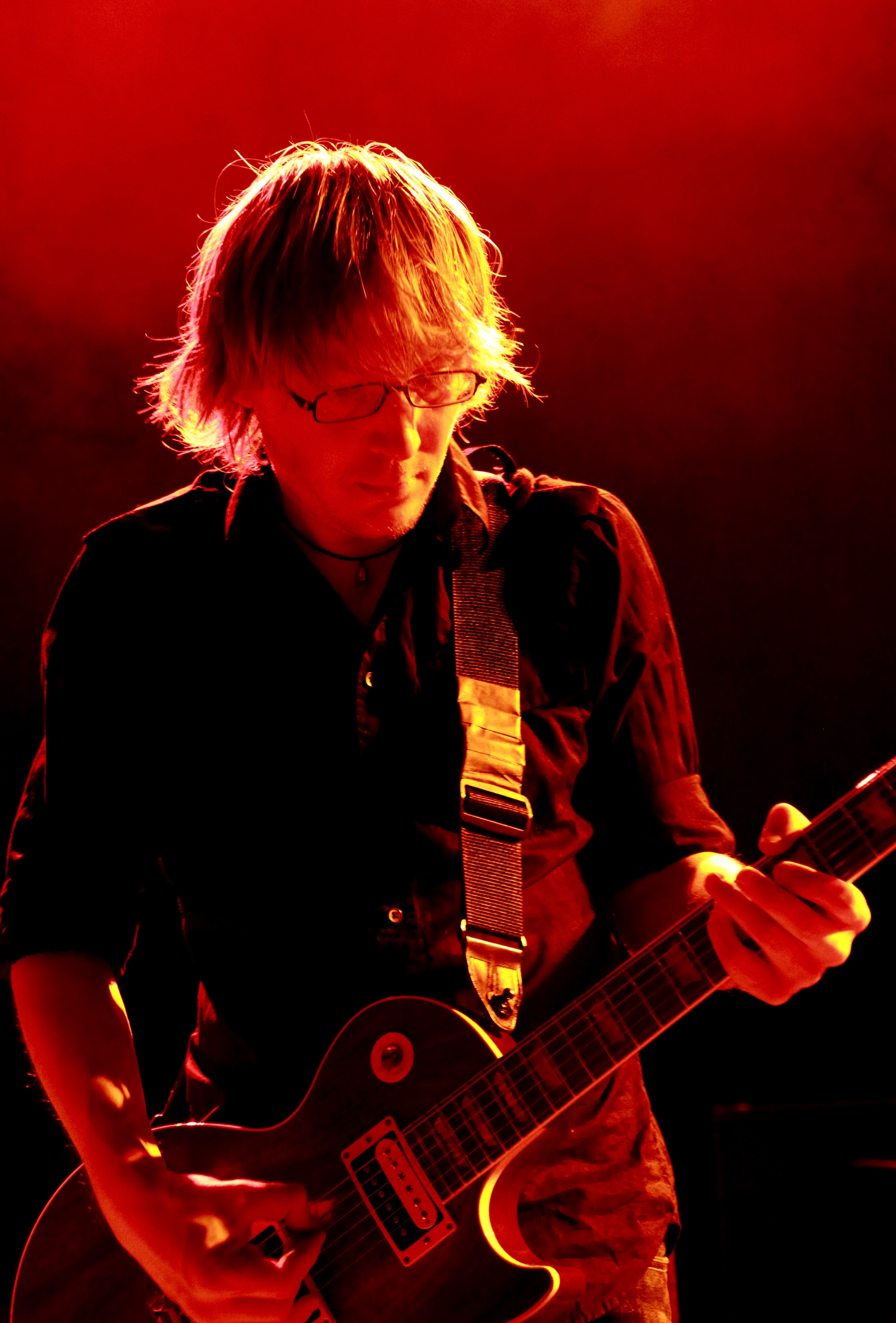

Background information
- Born: René Rutten; 2 July 1972 (age 54); Nijmegen, Netherlands
- Occupation: Musician
- Instruments: Guitar, bass, theremin
- Years active: 1989 to present
- Label: Psychonaut_Records
- Member of: The Gathering
- Website: The Gathering

René Rutten (born 2 July 1972 in Nijmegen, Gelderland) is a Dutch guitarist for The Gathering. He founded the band with his brother Hans in 1989, and together they released eleven studio albums, four live albums, and four EPs. His latest work with The Gathering was Beautiful Distortion, released in 2022. In 2015 Rutten formed a new band, "Habitants", who released their debut album in 2018.

== Discography ==
With The Gathering:

- Always... (1992)
- Almost a Dance (1993)
- Mandylion (1995)
- Adrenaline / Leaves - EP (1996)
- Nighttime Birds (1997)
- How to Measure a Planet? (1998)
- if then else (2000)
- Superheat (album) - Live (2000)
- Amity - EP (2001)
- Black Light District - EP (2002)
- In Motion - DVD (2002)
- Souvenirs (2003)
- Sleepy Buildings - A Semi Acoustic Evening - Live (2004)
- Accessories - Rarities and B-Sides - Compilation (2005)
- A Sound Relief - DVD (2005)
- Home (2006)
- A Noise Severe - DVD (2007)
- The West Pole (2009)
- Disclosure (2012)
- Afterwords (2013)
- TG25: Live at Doornroosje (2015)
- One Self (Habitants album) (2018)
- Beautiful Distortion (2022)
- Alma (Habitants album) (2024)
