= Always (The Gathering album) =

Always…

Studio album by The Gathering
- Released: 9 June 1992
- Recorded: 28 February – 7 March 1992
- Studio: Studio Beaufort, Bovenkarspel, Netherlands
- Genre: Death-doom; gothic metal
- Length: 47:56
- Label: Foundation 2000 (Europe); Pavement Music (US)
- Producer: Han Swagerman Sr., The Gathering, Mark Fritsma

The Gathering chronology
Moonlight Archer (1991)	Always… (1992)	Almost a Dance (1993)

Professional ratings
Review scores
Source	Rating
AllMusic	2/5 stars
Collector's Guide to Heavy Metal	6/10
Prog	3.5/5 stars
Rock Hard	8.5/10
Sputnikmusic	3.5/5 stars

Always… is the debut studio album of the Dutch band The Gathering. The record was initially released on 9 June 1992, in Europe by Foundation 2000 and in North America by Pavement Music. In 1994, a first remixed version of the album was released by Foundation 2000. In 1999, a second remixed version was released by Psychonaut Records. The Mexican edition was released by Scarecrow Records.

== Background ==
On this album, Bart Smits was the lead singer with death growls vocals and occasional clean female vocals by the guest member Marike Groot, who also joined the Gathering on stage for most of their first live shows. At the end of 1992, both Smits and Groot left the group due to musical differences, being briefly replaced by Niels Duffhuës and Martine van Loon.

== Musical style ==
Always... is categorized as a classic death-doom metal album and one of the earliest gothic metal albums.

The music features slow, funereal riffing and heavy guitars typical of the genre, but incorporates prominent keyboard parts and piano sections that add a dark, church-like ambience and an epic atmosphere.

Despite its limited commercial success outside the Netherlands, it is considered one of the pioneering atmospheric death/doom albums that helped lay the foundations for the gothic metal subgenre in the mid-90s. Among these, the development of the vocal style of "Beauty and the Beast" stands out (combining male growls with clean female voices).

== Track listing ==
All lyrics are written by Bart Smits; all music is composed by The Gathering.

No.	Title	Length
1.	"The Mirror Waters"	7:10
2.	"Subzero"	6:53
3.	"In Sickness and Health"	7:00
4.	"King for a Day"	6:33
5.	"Second Sunrise"	6:43
6.	"Stonegarden"	4:53
7.	"Always…"	2:40
8.	"Gaya's Dream"	6:04

Mexican edition bonus tracks
No.	Title	Length
1.	"In Sickness and Health" (Demo)	7:26
2.	"Gaya's Dream" (Demo)	6:23
3.	"Always…" (Demo)	2:30

The Mexican version features three additional tracks from the compilation album Downfall.

== Personnel ==
The Gathering

- Bart Smits – vocals, backing vocals
- René Rutten – electric and acoustic guitars
- Jelmer Wiersma – electric and 12 string acoustic guitars
- Frank Boeijen – keyboards, grand piano
- Hugo Prinsen Geerligs – bass, flute, triangle
- Hans Rutten – drums, wind chimes

Additional musicians

- Marike Groot – female vocals
- Henk van Koeverden – electronics, Korg MS-10

Production

- Recorded and mixed at the Beaufort Recording Studio, Bovenkarspel, the Netherlands from 28 February 1992, to 7 March 1992.
- Produced and mixed by Han Swagerman Sr. and The Gathering.
- Engineered by Han Swagerman Sr.
- Executive producer: Mark Fritsma
