= Disclosure (The Gathering album) =

2012 studio album by the Gathering

Studio album by The Gathering
- Released: 12 September 2012
- Genres: Alternative rock; trip hop
- Length: 51:42
- Label: Psychonaut
- Producer: René Rutten

The Gathering chronology
City from Above (2009)	Disclosure (2012)	Afterwords (2013)

Disclosure is the tenth studio album by the Dutch rock band The Gathering, released via Psychonaut Records on 12 September 2012.

== Background ==
The Gathering have evolved drastically in their 23 years of existence, going from death-doom metal in their early days, through gothic metal to more progressive sounds and settling somehow in a genre popularly labelled as "trip hop".

== Reception ==
Professional ratings
Review scores
Source	Rating
AllMusic	3/5 stars
Metal Hammer	3.5/5 stars
Sputnikmusic	4/5

Jonathan Selzer of Metal Hammer stated, "Less low-key, more electronics-infused than 2009's The West Pole, it's still at the mercy of melancholic driftwinds, Silje's rich, ruffled Arctic floe able to bear devastation with haunting, soul-cleansing grace. If you're fond of frill-free, fragile emotional hinterlands that don't dissolve under scrutiny, Disclosure will reach down deep." Sputnikmusic review observed, "From start to finish, Disclosure is an extraordinary endeavor into the farthest reaches of The Gathering's progressive/experimental side. Silge Wergeland plays a major role in Disclosure's success, but it is important not to overstate her responsibility at the expense of the rest of the band. Selecting even just a few tracks at random is enough to understand the quality and depth of their imagination, not to mention their strength of execution."

== Track listing ==
All lyrics by Silje Wergeland. All music by Frank Boeijen. Additional writers listed below.

No.	Title	Lyrics	Music	Length
1.	"Paper Waves"			5:32
2.	"Meltdown"	Frank Boeijen	René Rutten	7:56
3.	"Paralyzed"		René Rutten	5:04
4.	"Heroes for Ghosts"		René Rutten	10:42
5.	"Gemini I"			4:55
6.	"Missing Seasons"			3:26
7.	"I Can See Four Miles"		René Rutten	9:04
8.	"Gemini II"			5:03
Total length:				51:42

== Charts ==
Chart (2012)	Peak position
Belgian Albums Chart (Wallonia)	146

== Personnel ==
The Gathering

- Silje Wergeland – vocals
- René Rutten – guitars, theremin, backing vocals
- Hans Rutten – drums, backing vocals
- Frank Boeijen – keyboards, vocals, backing vocals
- Marjolein Kooijman – bass, backing vocals

Additional musicians

- Jos van den Dungen – violin and viola on track 1, 2, 3, 4, 6 and 7
- Noel Hofman – trumpet on track 2 and 4
- Maaike Peterse – cello on track 1, 3, 6 and 7
- Bjørnar Nilsen – speaking voice on track 7

Production

- Design [Design & Dtp] – Martijn Busink
- Producer, Engineer [Additional drums, all additional recordings] – René Rutten
- Engineer [Drums] – George Konings
- Engineer [Vocals] – Arve Isdal, Herbrand Larsen
- Illustration – Carlos Manuel Vergara Rivera
- Mastered By – Paul Matthijs Lombert
- Mixed By – Guido Aalbers
- Photography By [Band] – Marcus Moonen
