= Afterwords (The Gathering album) =

Studio album / remix album / EP by The Gathering
- Released: 25 October 2013
- Genre: Alternative rock
- Length: 41:29
- Label: Psychonaut
- Producer: René Rutten

The Gathering chronology
Disclosure (2012)	Afterwords (2013)	Beautiful Distortion (2022)

Afterwords is an album by the Dutch rock band The Gathering, released via Psychonaut Records on 25 October 2013. It is referred to as either a studio album or a remix album, containing remakes of five songs from Disclosure, but the band consider Afterwords more like an EP. Drummer Hans Rutten has stated, "We all see Disclosure as our last studio album, and Afterwords was more or less a Disclosure after-party... It's a mini album, maybe, but it's a long album. But that said, we don't see it as a full-length album of The Gathering, more as sort of an EP kind of thing." The record is the last album before the band went on hiatus and bassist Marjolein Kooijman quit in 2014.

== Song information ==
S.I.B.A.L.D. stands for "Sometimes it's better a little dusty".

Areas is a cover of synthpop band New Musik from their 1981 album Anywhere.

The title track features Bart Smits on vocals, in a clean singing style as opposed to his growling in the band's death-doom debut Always....

== Reception ==
Taking the elements from the previous album, the band has rebuilt some of the songs, structurally sounding more or less similar. "Echoes Keep Growing" is just an extension to "I Can See Four Miles", while "Sleep Paralysis" ("Paralyzed"), "Tuning In, Fading Out" ("Missing Seasons") and "Bärenfels" ("Heroes For Ghosts") are more instrumental versions with a lot of emphasis on electronics. There is also some new material, the opening and wonderful "S.I.B.A.L.D.", "Gemini III" and "Afterlights", which is a short instrumental intro into "Sleep Paralysis". It also features a New Musik's cover of "Areas" and "Afterwords" with Bart Smits (the first vocalist of the band) on the vocals, both songs which are utterly unnecessary as they don't fit into the dynamics of the album.

—Review on Terra Relicta (6.5/10)

== Track listing ==
No.	Title	Lyrics	Music	Length
1.	"S.I.B.A.L.D."	Silje Wergeland	René Rutten	5:02
2.	"Echoes Keep Growing"	Silje Wergeland	Frank Boeijen, René Rutten	6:52
3.	"Areas" (New Musik cover)	Tony Mansfield	Tony Mansfield	4:18
4.	"Afterwords"	Bart Smits	Frank Boeijen	4:01
5.	"Tuning In, Fading Out"	Silje Wergeland	Frank Boeijen	3:51
6.	"Gemini III"	Silje Wergeland	Frank Boeijen, René Rutten	4:00
7.	"Afterlights"	Silje Wergeland	Frank Boeijen	1:58
8.	"Sleep Paralysis"	Silje Wergeland	Frank Boeijen, René Rutten	3:15
9.	"Bärenfels"	Silje Wergeland	Frank Boeijen	8:12
Total length:				41:29

== Personnel ==
=== The Gathering ===
- Silje Wergeland : vocals, lyrics (except track 4), piano (on track 8)
- René Rutten : guitar, bass (on tracks 2, 3, 4, 6), mixing, recording, engineer, music (on tracks 1, 2, 6, 8), producer
- Marjolein Kooijman : bass (on tracks 1, 8, 9), guitar (on track 8)
- Hans Rutten : drums
- Frank Boeijen : keyboards, mixing, recording, engineer, music (on track 2, 4, 5, 6, 7, 8, 9), vocals (on track 3)

=== Guest musicians ===
- Noel Hofman: trumpet on tracks 1 and 9
- Bart Smits: vocals and lyrics on track 4
- Jakob Johannessen: speech on track 9

=== Production ===
- Martijn Busink: design
- Carlos Manuel Vergara Rivera: illustration
- Paul Matthijs Lombert: mastering
- Tony Mansfield: music and lyrics on track 3
- Gema Pérez: photography
