= Hugo Prinsen Geerligs =

Dutch bassist

Hugo Prinsen Geerligs (born 16 December 1973 in Oss) is a Dutch bassist. He was the original bassist of The Gathering, and together they released seven studio albums, two live albums, and three EPs. After the release of Sleepy Buildings - A Semi Acoustic Evening in 2004, he left the band. In 2009 he agreed to participate in the band's 20th anniversary tour.

== Discography ==
- An Imaginary Symphony - Demo (1990)
- Moonlight Archer - Demo (1991)
- Always... (1992)
- Almost a Dance (1993)
- Mandylion (1995)
- Adrenaline / Leaves - EP (1996)
- Nighttime Birds (1997)
- How to Measure a Planet? (1998)
- if then else (2000)
- Superheat - Live (2000)
- Amity - EP (2001)
- Downfall - The Early Years - Compilation (2001)
- Black Light District - EP (2002)
- In Motion - DVD (2002)
- Souvenirs (2003)
- Sleepy Buildings - A Semi Acoustic Evening - Live (2004)
- Accessories - Rarities and B-Sides - Compilation (2005)
