= Almost a Dance =

Studio album by The Gathering
- Released: 2 October 1993
- Recorded: September 1993
- Studio: Spitzbergen Studios, Zuidbroek, Groningen, Netherlands
- Genre: Doom metal, gothic metal
- Length: 54:22
- Label: Foundation 2000
- Producer: Tom Holkenborg, Mark Fritsma

The Gathering chronology
Always (1992)	Almost a Dance (1993)	Mandylion (1995)

Professional ratings
Review scores
Source	Rating
Rock Hard	7/10
Sputnikmusic	1.5/5

Almost a Dance is the second studio album by the Dutch doom metal band The Gathering, released on 2 October 1993.

== Background ==
This is the band's only album with lead singer Niels Duffhuës (with his occasional female counterpart Martine van Loon). Duffhuës also played a key role in songwriting and instrumentation, aspects that helped shift the band's direction towards a lighter, more progressive sound.

However, the public reaction was mostly negative towards his voice type and limited range, as well as his lack of connection with The Gathering's music. Consequently, in 1994 the band decided to introduce a frontwoman going forward, and he was replaced by Anneke van Giersbergen.

== Track listing ==
Credits adapted from the original release.

No.	Title	Lyrics	Music	Length
1.	"On a Wave"	Niels Duffhuës	The Gathering	5:53
2.	"The Blue Vessel"	Duffhuës	René Rutten	6:04
3.	"Her Last Flight"	Duffhuës	Frank Boeijen, Hugo Prinsen Geerligs, Rutten	8:47
4.	"The Sky People"	Duffhuës	Boeijen	4:27
5.	"Nobody Dares"	Duffhuës	Duffhuës	3:32
6.	"Like Fountains"	Duffhuës, Martine van Loon	Boeijen, Rutten	7:41
7.	"Proof"	Duffhuës	Boeijen, Jelmer Wiersma	6:18
8.	"Heartbeat Amplifier"	Duffhuës	Boeijen, Rutten	4:51
9.	"A Passage to Desire"	Duffhuës, van Loon	Boeijen, Prinsen Geerligs, Rutten	6:44
Total length:				54:22

== Personnel ==
The Gathering

- Niels Duffhuës – lead vocals, acoustic guitar, arrangements on track 5
- Martine van Loon – female vocals (tracks 1, 4, 6, and 9)
- René Rutten – guitars, theremin, digeridoo
- Jelmer Wiersma – guitars
- Frank Boeijen – keyboards
- Hugo Prinsen Geerligs – bass guitar, flute, triangle
- Hans Rutten – drums, arrangements

Production

- Tom Holkenborg – producer, engineer, mixing
- Mark Fritsma – executive producer
