= A Noise Severe =

Live album by The Gathering

Video by The Gathering
- Released: 2007
- Recorded: 24 March 2007 at Teatro Caupolicán, Santiago, Chile
- Genre: Progressive rock, alternative rock, trip hop
- Label: Psychonaut Records

The Gathering chronology
A Sound Relief (2005)	A Noise Severe (2007)

A Noise Severe

Live album by The Gathering
- Released: 2007
- Recorded: 24 March 2007 at Teatro Caupolicán, Santiago, Chile.
- Genre: Progressive rock, alternative rock, trip hop
- Label: Psychonaut Records

The Gathering chronology
Sleepy Buildings (2004)	A Noise Severe (2007)

Professional ratings
Review scores
Source	Rating
Sputnikmusic	4/5

A Noise Severe is a live recording by Dutch rock band The Gathering, released on 31 October 2007, on the group's own record label, Psychonaut Records. The album was recorded at Teatro Caupolicán, Santiago, Chile, on 24 March 2007. The live recording was released in a 2xDVD package with an accompanying 2xCD package available separately.

A Noise Severe showcases The Gathering's heavier side, and is a companion to their 2005 2xDVD semi-acoustic release, A Sound Relief.

== Track listing ==
DVD

Disc 1

1. "Shortest Day" – 4:41
2. "In Between" – 4:35
3. "Liberty Bell" – 5:30
4. "Probably Built In The Fifties" – 6:46
5. "Even The Spirits Are Afraid" – 6:04
6. "Saturnine" – 4:24
7. "Monsters" – 5:32
8. "Alone" – 4:48
9. "A Noise Severe" – 7:35
10. "Leaves" – 5:41
11. "Eléanor" – 6:43
12. "In Motion #1" – 6:07
13. "Waking Hour" – 6:02
14. "On Most Surfaces" – 6:34
15. "Strange Machines" – 6:35
16. "Adrenaline" – 4:34
17. "Third Chance" – 4:59
18. "Black Light District" – 16:18
19. "Travel" – 9:43

Disc 2

1. Homemade – a studio documentary by Danyael Sugawara & Camiel Zwart
2. The 3 winning video of the Alone contest
3. Videoclip of Forgotten
4. Box and Waking Hour projection clip
5. Edison 'thank you' videoclip
6. The making of A Noise Severe

CD

Disc 1
No.	Title	Length
1.	"Shortest Day"	4:41
2.	"In Between"	4:35
3.	"Liberty Bell"	5:30
4.	"Probably Built In The Fifties"	6:46
5.	"Even The Spirits Are Afraid"	6:04
6.	"Saturnine"	4:24
7.	"Monsters"	5:32
8.	"Alone"	4:48
9.	"A Noise Severe"	7:35
10.	"Leaves"	5:41
11.	"Eléanor"	6:43
12.	"In Motion #1"	6:07

Disc 2
No.	Title	Length
1.	"Waking Hour"	6:02
2.	"On Most Surfaces (Inuït)"	6:34
3.	"Strange Machines"	6:35
4.	"Adrenaline"	4:34
5.	"Third Chance"	4:59
6.	"Black Light District"	16:18
7.	"Travel"	9:43
