= Niels Duffhuës =

Niels Duffhuës (born 8 January 1973 in Oss) is a Dutch multi-instrumentalist, composer and writer. From 1993 to 1994 he was the vocalist and acoustic guitarist in the then Doom metal band The Gathering, and he played on their album Almost a Dance, released in 1993. From 1997 to 1998, he played drums in U-Charger. In 1998 he founded the experimental rock band Enos, and he recorded the album Tremolo with them, before they split in 2001. From 2000 to 2002 he was also a member of Blimey!. After that he started a solo career, and he released several albums. He released The Village in 2018.

== Discography ==
- The Gathering - Almost a Dance (1993)
- Enos - Tremolo (2000)

=== Solo albums ===
- Piranesi's Rome (2001)
- Jacky the Stripper (2002)
- Harem (2005)
- Man on Fire (2007)
- Songs of Mystery (2009)
- Among the Ruins (2011)
- There's a Storm coming (2014)
- The Village (2018)
