= Bart Smits =

Dutch singer

Bart Smits (born 17 March 1972 in Oss) is a Dutch heavy metal singer. He was the original singer in The Gathering, and he sang on their first album Always..., released in 1992. The following year he left them to form Wish. After one full-length album and four EPs, the band split up in 2003. Smits' latest work is Wish's Ground Zero Heaven, released in 2000.

== Discography ==
=== With The Gathering ===
- An Imaginary Symphony - Demo (1990)
- Moonlight Archer - Demo (1991)
- Always... (1992)
- Afterwords (2013)
- TG25: Live at Doornroosje (live) (2015)

=== With Wish ===
- Monochrome (1995)
- Jane Doe - EP (1996)
- Eve of Self-Destruction - EP (1997)
- www.wish-2013.nl - EP (1999)
- Ground Zero Heaven - EP (2000)
