= If Then Else =

if_then_else

Studio album by The Gathering
- Released: 3 July 2000
- Recorded: January–March 2000
- Studios: Koeienverhuurbedrijf Studio, Purmerend, S&K Studio, Doetinchem, The Netherlands
- Genres: Progressive rock; alternative rock
- Length: 52:46
- Label: Century Media
- Producers: The Gathering; co-produced by Zlaya Hadzich

The Gathering chronology
Superheat (2000)	if_then_else (2000)	Black Light District (2002)

Professional ratings
Review scores
Source	Rating
AllMusic	4.5/5 stars
Chronicles of Chaos	9.5/10
Rock Hard	8.5/10

If Then Else (stylized if_then_else) is the sixth studio album by the Dutch rock band The Gathering. The album was released on 3 July 2000 through Century Media.

== Background ==
The album was recorded at the Koeienverhuurbedrijf Studio, Purmerend, and at S&K Studio, Doetinchem between January and March 2000, under the band's own guidance with Zlaya Hadzich as co-producer. The album was engineered by Zlaya Hadzich and Dick Kemper, mixed and mastered on Pro Tools by Attie Bauw at Bauwhaus Studio, Amsterdam, in April 2000.

Its title combines two frequently used computer programming notations:

- The if, then, else conditional statement
- The use of all lowercase, underscore-separated words (known as snake case)

"Colorado Incident" is about a real-life experience of having to cancel a gig in Colorado because of overbooking, exhaustion and the band members' illnesses. Fans were frustrated, and the band was later very apologetic about this "incident". (It is apparently not about the 1999 Columbine High School massacre, as often speculated.)

An excerpt of Lewis Carroll's Alice in Wonderland, narrated by Willie Rushton, is heard between "Analog Park" and "Herbal Movement".

== Track listing ==
All lyrics are written by Anneke van Giersbergen, except when noted; all music is composed by The Gathering.

No.	Title	Length
1.	"Rollercoaster"	4:45
2.	"Shot to Pieces"	4:10
3.	"Amity"	5:57
4.	"Bad Movie Scene"	3:49
5.	"Colorado Incident" (René Rutten, van Giersbergen)	4:53
6.	"Beautiful War"	2:33
7.	"Analog Park"	6:06
8.	"Herbal Movement"	4:11
9.	"Saturnine"	5:12
10.	"Morphia's Waltz"	6:37
11.	"Pathfinder"	4:39
Total length:		52:46

== Personnel ==
The Gathering

- Anneke van Giersbergen – lead vocals
- René Rutten – guitars, vibraphone
- Frank Boeijen – synthesizer, keyboards, drum programming, Hammond, piano, effects
- Hugo Prinsen Geerligs – bass
- Hans Rutten – drums, percussion

Additional musicians

- Bart van Vegchel – French horn (Tracks 1, 6, and 11)
- Ad Verspaandonk – trombone (Tracks 6 and 11)
- Emmeke Bressers – oboe (Track 6)
- Jasper Slotboom – cello (Track 6)
- Marthe Kalkhoven – cello (Track 6)
- Jiska ter Bals – violin (Tracks 3, 6, 9, 10, and 11)

== Charts ==
Chart (2000)	Peak position
Dutch Albums Chart	47
German Albums Chart	76
