= Gothic metal =

Genre of heavy metal music

- Stylistic origins: Heavy metal; gothic rock; death-doom
- Cultural origins: Early 1990s, United Kingdom

Subgenres
- Symphonic gothic metal

Regional scenes
- England; Finland; The Netherlands; Norway; Sweden; Germany; Italy; Poland; United States; Greece

Other topics
- Alternative metal; avant-garde metal; list of gothic metal bands; industrial metal; post-metal

Gothic metal (or goth metal) is a fusion genre combining the aggression of heavy metal with the dark atmospheres of gothic rock. The music of gothic metal is diverse with bands known to adopt the gothic approach to different styles of heavy metal music. The genre originated during the early 1990s in the United Kingdom originally as an outgrowth of death-doom, a fusion of death metal and doom metal. Lyrics are generally dark and introspective with inspiration from gothic fiction as well as personal experiences.

Pioneers of gothic metal include Lacrimosa from Germany, Paradise Lost, My Dying Bride, and Anathema, from the north of England , Type O Negative from the United States, Lake of Tears, Tiamat and Katatonia from Sweden, Sentenced from Finland and the Gathering from the Netherlands. Norwegian band Theatre of Tragedy developed the "beauty and the beast" aesthetic of combining aggressive male vocals with clean female vocals, a contrast that had been adopted by groups before them, but not as a regular trademark; several bands have employed the technique since. During the mid-1990s, Moonspell, Theatres des Vampires, Rotting Christ and Cradle of Filth brought the gothic approach to black metal. By the end of the decade, a symphonic metal variant of gothic metal had been developed by Tristania and Within Temptation. Nightwish also integrated elements of gothic metal into their well-known mix of symphonic metal and power metal.

In the 2000s, gothic metal has moved towards the mainstream in Europe, particularly in Finland where groups such as Entwine, Charon, HIM, Lullacry, the 69 Eyes, and Poisonblack have released hit singles or chart-topping albums. In the US, however, only a few bands such as Type O Negative and Evanescence have found some degree of commercial success.

== Etymology ==
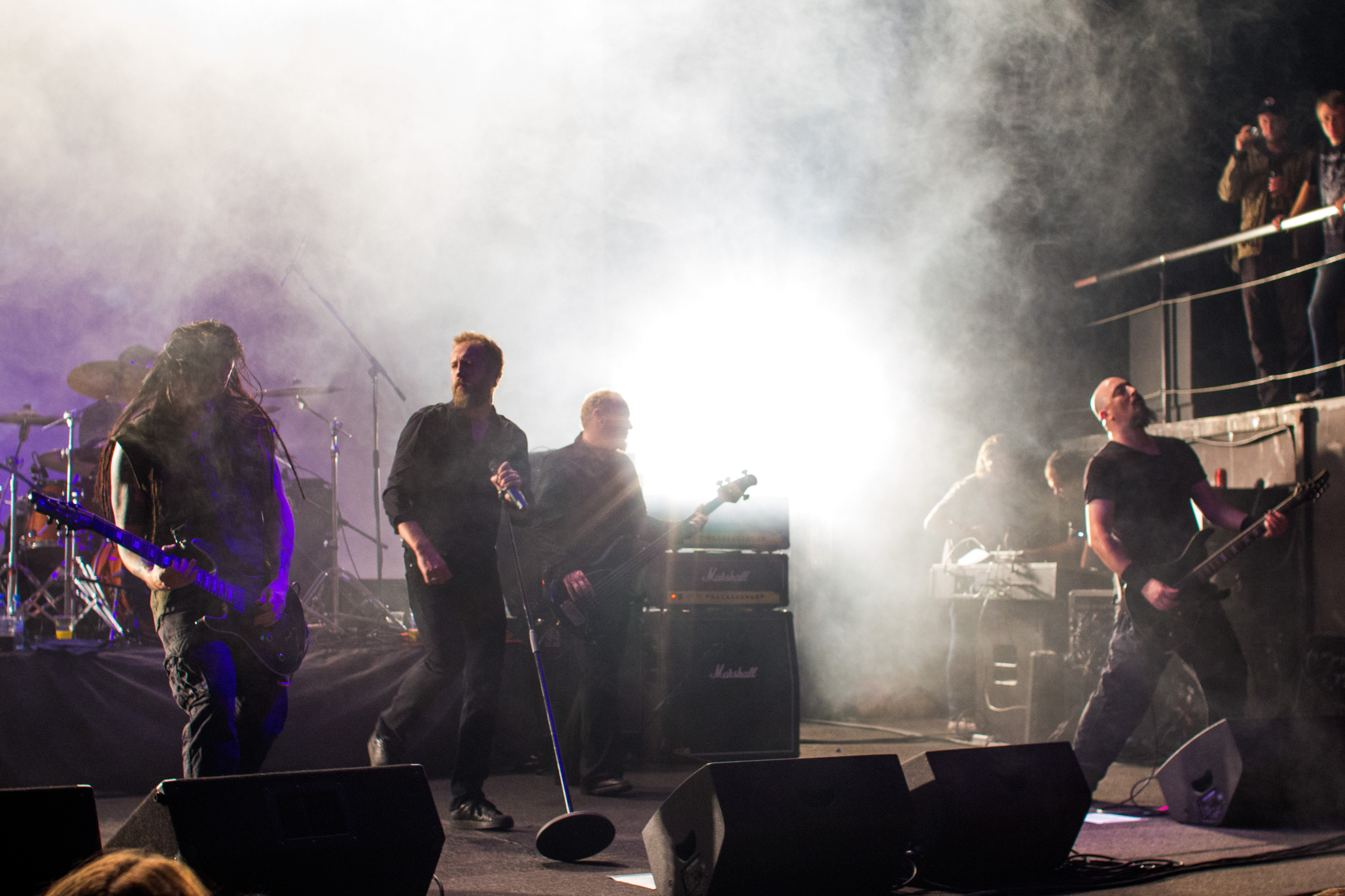
Paradise Lost's 1991 album Gothic inspired the name of the genre.

Some musicians have disputed the gothic label associated with their bands, including Rozz Williams of Christian Death and Andrew Eldritch of the Sisters of Mercy. In the gothic metal subgenre, members from such groups as After Forever and Nightwish have similarly downplayed or dismissed the gothic label from their music.

== Characteristics ==
=== Sonic traits ===
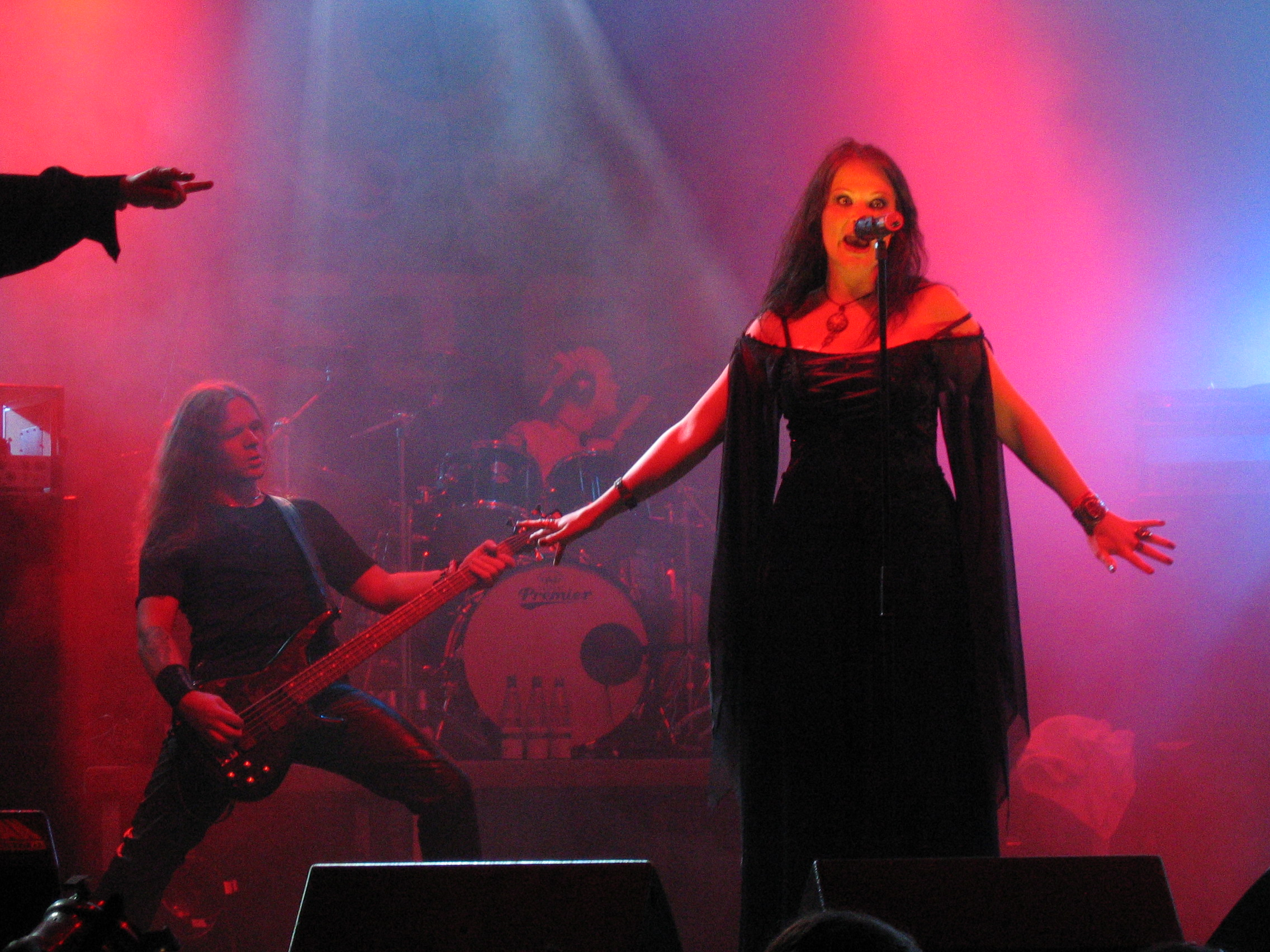
Gothic metal band Tristania

The music of gothic metal is generally characterised by its dark atmospheres. The adjective "dark" is commonly used to describe gothic music in general while other terms that are less frequently used include deep, romantic, passionate and intense. Gothic metal has also sometimes been viewed as "a combination of the darkness and melancholy of goth rock with heavy metal". Allmusic defines the genre as a fusion of "the bleak, icy atmospherics of goth rock with the loud guitars and aggression of heavy metal" and further notes that "true goth metal is always directly influenced by goth rock — ethereal synths and spooky textures are just as important as guitar riffs, if not more so".

Gothic metal is a varied genre with bands pursuing many different directions, from "slow and crushing variations" to "orchestral and bombastic". The doom metal background of early pioneers like Anathema, Paradise Lost and My Dying Bride has been taken up by groups like Artrosis, Ava Inferi and Draconian. The black metal approach of Cradle of Filth, Theatres des Vampires and early Moonspell can be found in such subsequent bands as Graveworm and Samsas Traum.

=== Vocals ===
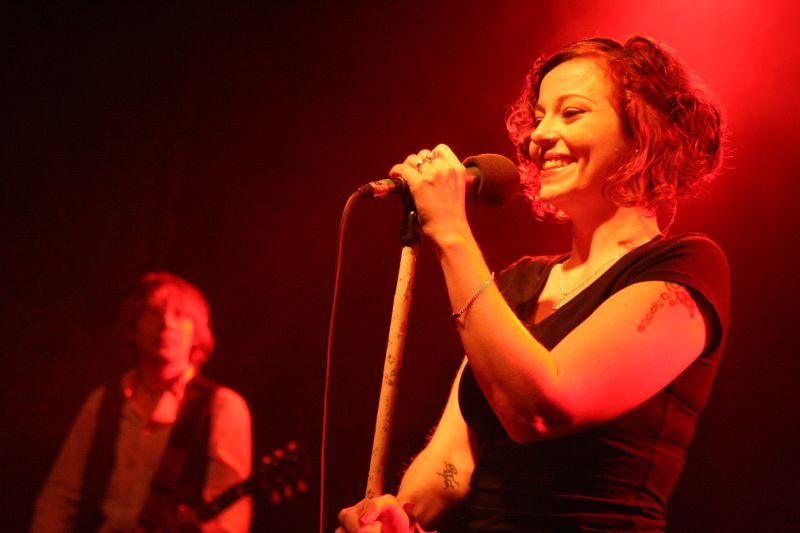
Lead female vocalists are a common presence in the gothic metal genre. One of the earliest was Anneke van Giersbergen of the Gathering, depicted above.

There is also a diverse range of vocal styles in gothic metal. Male singers in the genre range from the guttural growls and black metal shrieks of Dani Filth and Morten Veland to the clean baritone vocals of Østen Bergøy and the bass range of Peter Steele. For the female singers, the different vocal styles includes the screams and growls of Cadaveria, the "poppy" vocals of Tanja Lainio from Lullacry and the operatic soprano style of Vibeke Stene from Tristania. There are more female singers in gothic metal than there are in any other heavy metal subgenre, but female vocals are neither necessary nor synonymous with the genre. Liv Kristine of Theatre of Tragedy and Leaves' Eyes notes that the gothic tag is often misinterpreted and points out that "not every band with female vocals is a gothic band". The genre is also known to attract more female fans relative to other subgenres of heavy metal music.

=== Lyrics ===
The lyrics of gothic metal are known to be melodramatic, fantasized, romantic, dark or sometimes gloomy. For the three English bands that helped to pioneer the genre, their gloomy lyrics reflect their background in doom metal while their darker or melodramatic lyrics draw influence from gothic rock. The music of My Dying Bride has been noted as "dripping with treachery and pain" from a "lyrical fascination with deceit and transgressions of every variety". Lyrics that focus on suicide and the meaninglessness of life can be found in Anathema while Paradise Lost too has "never lost their depressive edge".

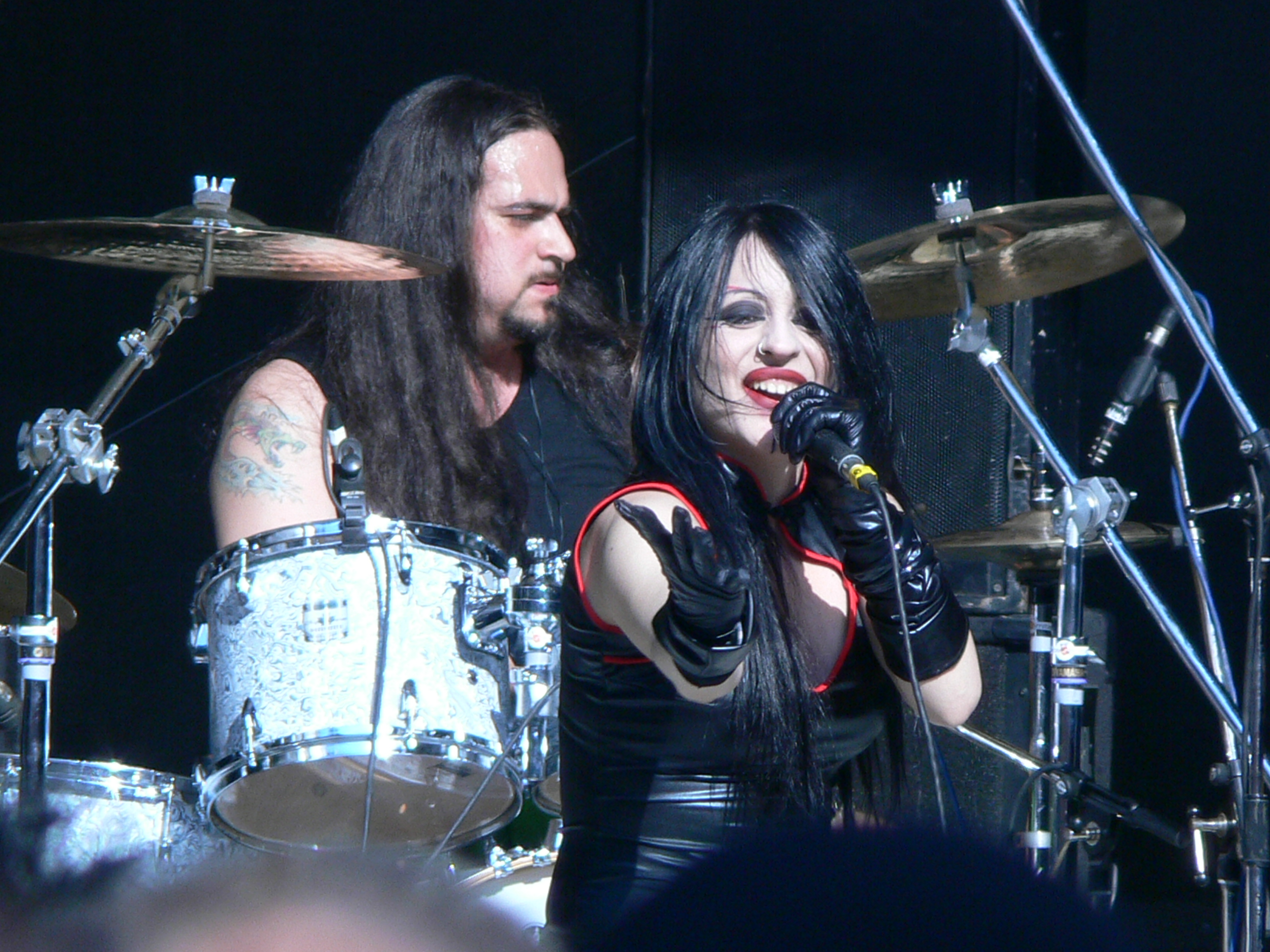
The Italian gothic, black metal band Theatres des Vampires manifests a deep interest in the vampire myth, a common staple of gothic horror fiction.

Gothic fiction, a literary genre that blends horror and romance, has been a source of inspiration for the lyrics of many gothic metal bands like Cadaveria, Cradle of Filth, Moonspell, Theatres des Vampires and Xandria. Critic Eduardo Rivadavia of Allmusic identifies drama and mournful beauty as requisite elements of the genre. For My Dying Bride, the subjects of "death and misery and lost love and romance" have been approached repeatedly from different angles. The common gothic theme of lost love is a subject that has been tackled by such gothic metal bands as Theatre of Tragedy and Leaves' Eyes.

Lyrics based on personal experiences are another common feature of many gothic metal bands such as Anathema, Elis, Evanescence, Tiamat, Midnattsol and the Old Dead Tree. Graveworm moved away from fantasy stories in favour of personal lyrics after finding them more suitable for their style of music. The lyrics of fellow Italians Lacuna Coil also do not feature any "fantasy stuff or something that you cannot find in reality" as their co-vocalist Cristina Scabbia finds it desirable that people can relate themselves to her band's lyrics. Similarly, the band Lullacry features lyrics on the subjects of "love, hate, passion and pain" because a person "can easily connect to a song" with lyrics "about human relationships". A few bands, such as Saviour Machine and Virgin Black, deal extensively with Christian religious themes and navigating personal religious faith.

== History ==
=== Precursors ===
==== Heavy metal ====
Black Sabbath's self-titled debut album (1970) with its gothic cover art

Heavy metal music is perceived by many members of the goth subculture as the "crass, crude macho antithesis of everything that their music represents". In contrast to the "softer" and "more feminine" character of gothic music, the heavy metal genre is typically associated with aggression and masculinity. Despite this difference, "a few bold souls have identified Black Sabbath's eponymous 1970 debut album as the first ever 'Goth-rock' record". The author Gavin Baddeley notes that the title track of the album "describes a satanic rite, complete with driving-rain and tolling bell sound effects, while the cover focuses on a black-cloaked, spectral-looking girl in a graveyard, shot through a sickly pale ochre filter". Other commentators have described Black Sabbath as the "absolute prototype gothic heavies" and observed that by separating the band's music "from their heavy metallic connotations", one "could cull a killer Goth album from their first five LP's, with every future reference point and requirement intact".

The "vaguely medieval, minor-key sounds" of Rainbow, Dio and Judas Priest have also been described as "gothic" prior to "the emergence of goth rock as a post-punk genre". The bands Blue Öyster Cult and Iron Maiden have featured some gothic lyrics in their music on songs such as "(Don't Fear) The Reaper" and "Phantom of the Opera". Deep Purple's song "Stormbringer" has been called a "goth metal treasure". The Danish metal band Mercyful Fate had also demonstrated "a Gothic obsession with evil and the occult". Frontman King Diamond continued exploring his interest in gothic storytelling after establishing a solo career under his own moniker, issuing "a series of concept albums which told Gothic horror tales with sound effects and song". During the 1980s, the Misfits frontman Glenn Danzig also "occupied the no man's land between Goth and heavy metal". With the dissolution of his second band Samhain in 1988 and the creation of his own eponymous act, Danzig went on to combine heavy metal riffs with "a heavily romanticized, brooding, gothic sensibility".

The Swiss group Celtic Frost was another precursor to gothic metal, translating the influence they drew from gothic rock acts Bauhaus and Siouxsie and the Banshees into their own albums. The band's "radical fusion of violent black metal and elements of classical music" was dubbed "avant-garde" and had a huge impact "on the evolution of European heavy metal". Christofer Johnsson of Therion cites Celtic Frost's 1987 album Into the Pandemonium in particular for playing a key role in the development of the "gothic and symphonic wave of bands" in the 1990s, noting further that neither his group Therion nor Paradise Lost "would have sounded the way we did without Celtic Frost".

==== Gothic rock ====
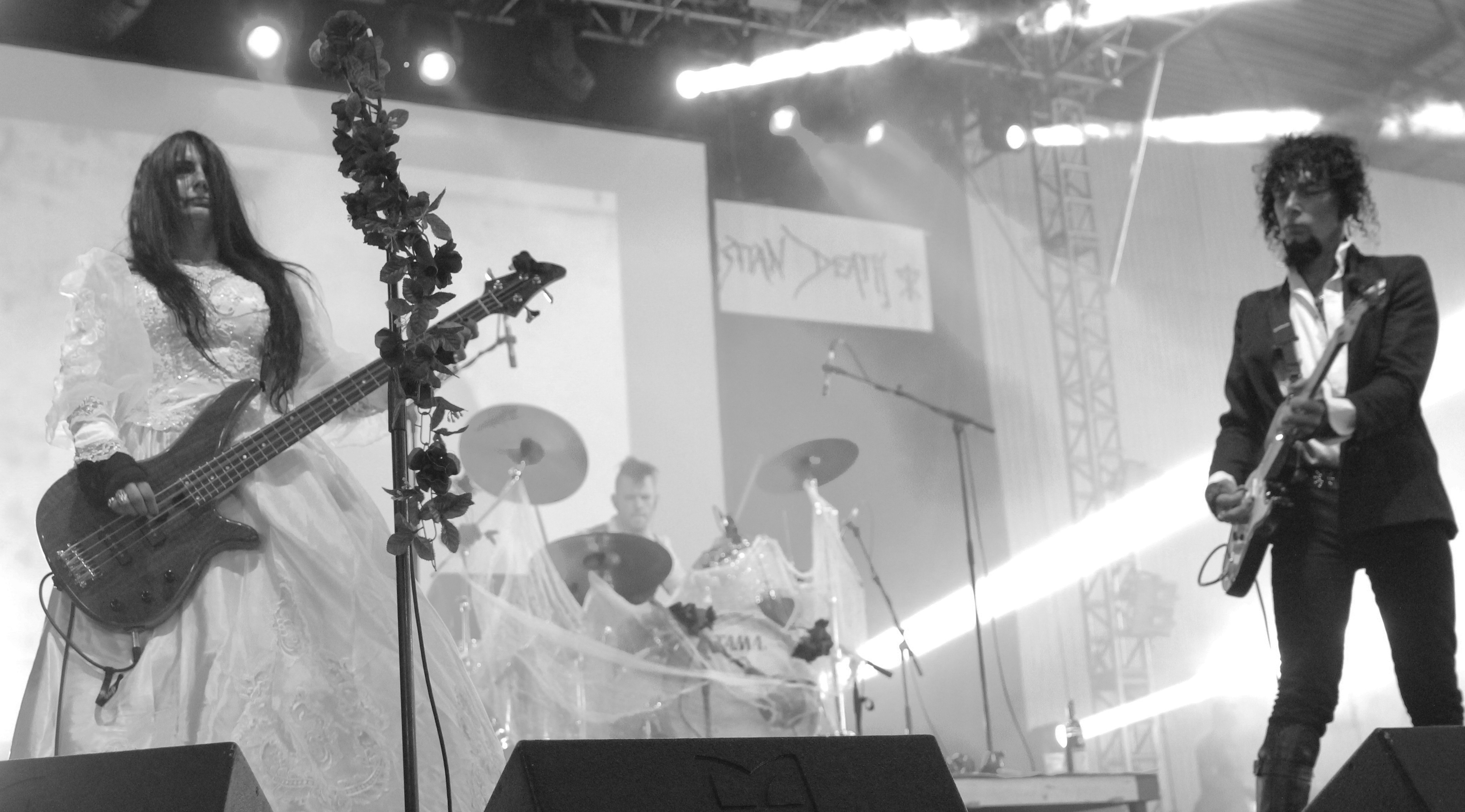
Gothic rock band Christian Death performing live at Wave-Gotik-Treffen in Leipzig, Germany, in 2014

Gothic rock had emerged as an offshoot of post-punk in the 1980s but by the end of that decade, the genre had splintered into different directions with bands such as the Cure, Siouxsie and the Banshees and the Mission incorporating "more pop and alternative elements" while the Sisters of Mercy, Fields of the Nephilim and Christian Death took on a "heavier, sometimes metal-influenced approach". The Sisters of Mercy was one of the leading goth bands of the 1980s, playing "a slow, gloomy, ponderous hybrid of metal and psychedelia, often incorporating dance beats". The band only released three full-length albums with the debut First and Last and Always released in 1985. Their last album Vision Thing arrived in 1990 as one of the earliest attempts to mix gothic music with heavy metal. Fields of the Nephilim had also released only three studio albums before their initial dissolution in 1991. They have since reformed, released more albums and been recognised for their influence on the "glut of metal bands" in the early 21st century "that incorporated obvious elements of goth into their sound — especially detected in their appreciation of symphonic and keyboard sounds (as well as their fashion sense)".

According to AllMusic, "goth metal first emerged during the early to mid-'80s, centered around Los Angeles' so-called 'death-rock' scene headed by Christian Death". Acclaimed as the "founding fathers of American goth rock", Christian Death went through a major personnel change in 1985 with the departure of the band's leader and founder Rozz Williams. Guitarist Valor Kand took over the reins and, under his leadership, Christian Death subsequently pursued a more metal-oriented direction. In particular, their 1988 album Sex and Drugs and Jesus Christ has been described by critic Steve Huey as "heavy goth-rock bordering on metal".

=== Origins ===
==== The Peaceville Three ====
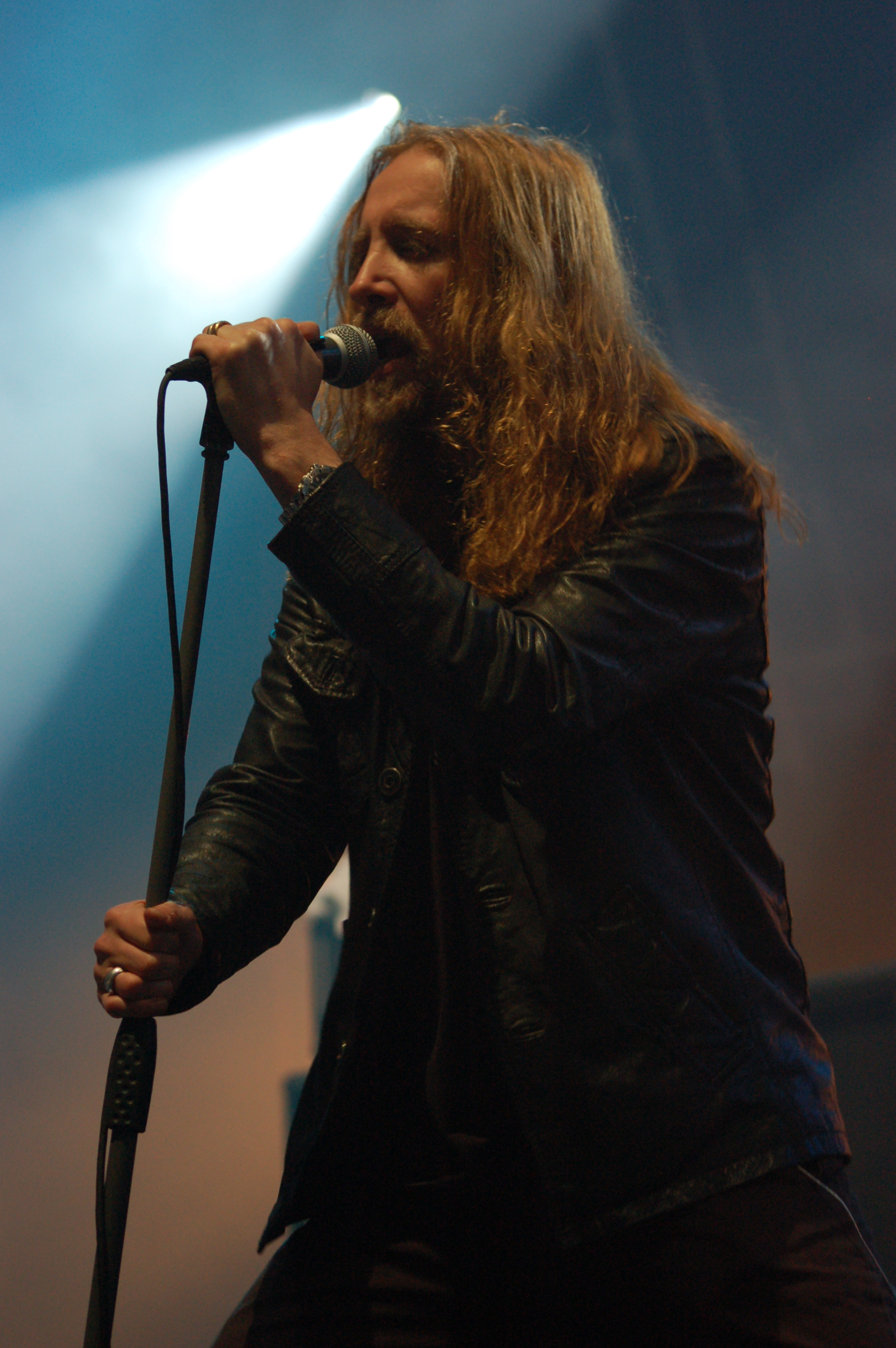
Nick Holmes is the vocalist of the pioneering Paradise Lost. The group is known to have influenced many subsequent bands in the genre.

As a musical style, gothic metal "truly began in the early 1990s in the north of England" with the three bands Paradise Lost, My Dying Bride and Anathema representing "the core of the movement". They are also recognised as three of the major bands that pioneered the death/doom subgenre, showing why gothic metal originated from death/doom. All three bands were signed to Peaceville Records during the early 1990s and have since been known as the "Peaceville Three". They had roots in "frenetically abrasive death metal, but they were also influenced by what Paradise Lost vocalist, Nick Holmes, described as the 'really bleak, dark sound' of Dead Can Dance".

Paradise Lost were the first to form in 1988 in Halifax, England. Their debut album Lost Paradise was released in 1990 and "helped define the rules of doom/death metal: grinding, de-tuned anthems of woe topped with death metal-style guttural vocals" while demonstrating that the band was "already reaching for realms unknown to their then-amateurish abilities and latent promise". The band was "evolving at a fast clip" and in the following year, their second "aptly titled album" Gothic came as "something of a departure for the band's earliest fans". With a "less deliberate, more energetic arrangements", the album featured a "slightly cleaner approach to guitar crunch" and "cautious use of keyboards and even female vocals, which together added atmospheric nuances to the group's ultra-depressive power chords". Gothic was a chart success across Europe, particularly in Germany, and has since been acclaimed as "one of the most influential albums" in heavy metal music for creating the gothic metal genre. Their 1992 album Shades of God continued the transition while the follow-up 1993 album Icon represented "a turning point" for the band with the experimental use of synthesised strings, timpani, piano and angelic female vocals. By the time of 1995's Draconian Times album, Paradise Lost's music firmly stood "between stark, oppressive goth rock and crunching heavy metal". With these five albums, the band had created "a bold collection of songs that sounded like Black-era Metallica played by a group who loved the Sisters of Mercy". They have since been recognised as the band that "originally laid the gothic seed that other bands have been nicking and reaping in recent years".

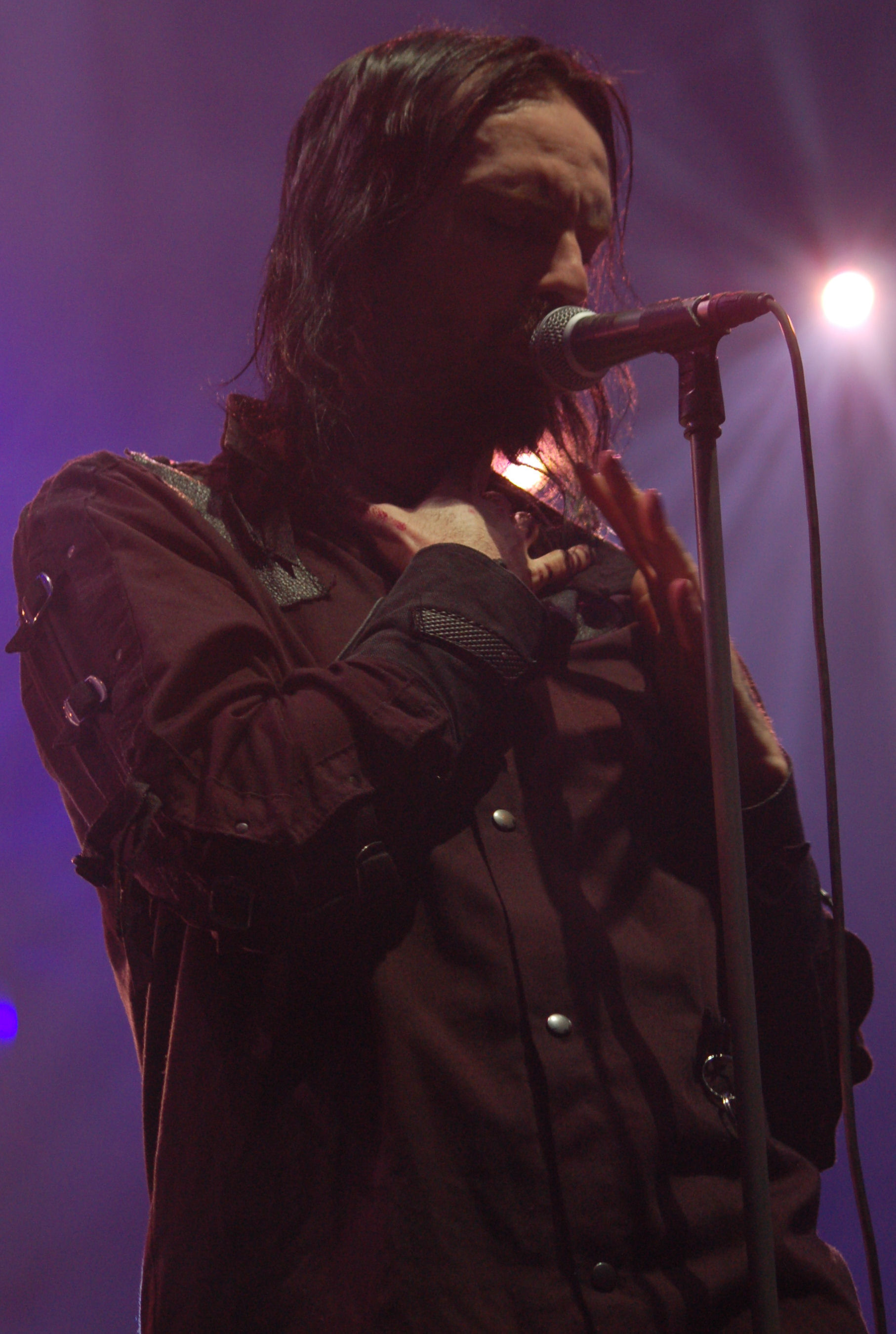
Aaron Stainthorpe of My Dying Bride credits Dead Can Dance, Swans and Nick Cave and the Bad Seeds as inspirations.

From Bradford, My Dying Bride were formed in 1990. An EP, Symphonaire Infernus et Spera Empyrium, "sparked a lot of interest" upon its release in 1991. Their first full-length release, As the Flower Withers, followed shortly after in the same year. The album was critically acclaimed by the press and "turned the Doom genre on its head". They added a violinist to their line-up for their 1993 sophomore effort Turn Loose the Swans. On this "groundbreaking" album, the group introduced a "much greater element of dark romanticism to their doomy music". Vocalist Aaron Stainthorpe explains the band's pursuit of this direction:

We knew that when Celtic Frost disappeared and turned into a glam rock band, we knew there was a market there for this sort of over-the-top avant-garde band, someone who were doing something a bit weird and unusual. Paradise Lost were doing similar-ish kind of things, but I don't think they had this more romantic edge. We definitely worked for that gothic appeal, and I'm not really sure why.

Their 1995 album The Angel and the Dark River "marked a shift in the band's strategy, for the first time dropping the death growl of Stainthorpe in favour of a 'clean' vocal delivery". The rest of the group "followed suit, setting aside any death metal influences, carefully using violins and keyboards to enhance the group's brooding excursions" into "fauna-wilting gothic doom metal". While the album was more experimental, the music was still dark and atmospheric.

Also forming in 1990, the Liverpool-based band Anathema released a "highly acclaimed" EP, The Crestfallen, in 1992. The "crushing emotional doom/death" of this EP remained on their 1993 debut full-length Serenades, "the most traditional doom-styled album in their catalog". Their juxtaposition of the fragile and ferocious "fostered a keen fan base". Pentecost III was recorded in 1994 as another EP "that nonetheless ended up long enough to have qualified as a full-length". The year 1995 saw the release of this EP as well as the departure of Darren White. Guitarist Vincent Cavanagh took over vocal duties for their subsequent album The Silent Enigma released later in the same year. The album "marked an important turning point in the band's sound" with critics drawing upon comparisons to Pink Floyd, "bringing new appreciation from a more mainstream band of listeners but also causing a withdrawal of support from hardened Doom fanatics". Like My Dying Bride, this transition involved leaving behind their traditional death metal sound. They continued experimenting with their 1996 album Eternity, "stretching its songs into sorrowful, orchestrated epics" that "quickly proved to be their most original work to date". While Anathema's music has "changed a lot", their "main features remained a heart-rending melancholy and intensity".

==== Other pioneers ====
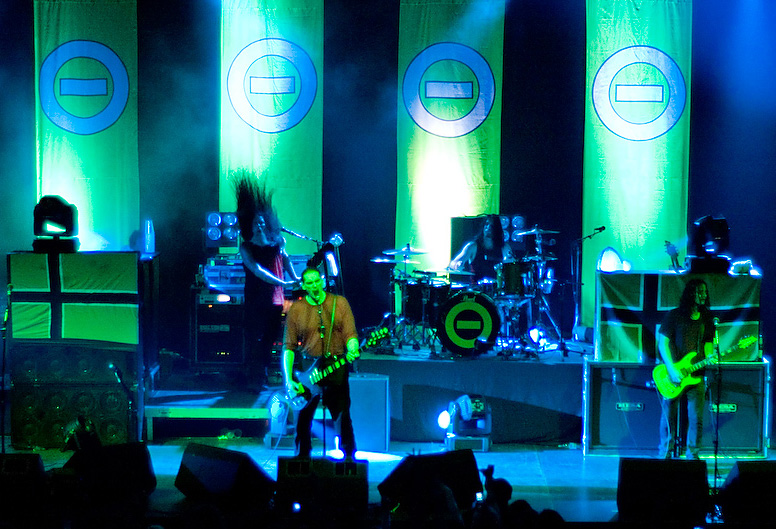
Type O Negative, performing at the Columbiahalle in Berlin, Germany, was one of the earliest gothic metal bands.

In North America, Peter Steele had formed Type O Negative in 1990 out of the remnants of his former thrash metal band Carnivore. With their debut album Slow, Deep and Hard in 1991, the New York based outfit pursued a "melodramatic goth rock style" that "encompasses long songs built on simple riffs, theatrical shouting vocals, churchy-sounding organ and vocal-harmony passages, and the odd mechanical noise". The Origin of the Feces followed in 1992, but it was their third album Bloody Kisses in 1993 that became their breakthrough album. AllMusic reviewer Steve Huey noted that the album had a "twistedly affectionate send-up of goth rock conventions" and lyrics that "gleefully wallow in goth clichés — sex, death, Christianity, vampires, more sex, and death". The album has since sold nearly a million copies in the United States, a surprise success that "obliged Goths to take notice" of the group. The trademarks of Type O Negative's music include the use of "downtuned, fuzzy guitars" and a "deep baritone croon" from Peter Steele, an "intimidatingly large, sarcastically self-deprecating original, whose dry, dirty one-liners and morbid machismo challenge those who insist the archetypal Goth is a po-faced androgyne". Type O Negative has since been recognised as a pioneer of the genre. In a review of their 2007 album Dead Again, critic Greg Prato of Allmusic declared that "before Type O Negative, there was really no such thing as goth metal".

Also in North America, the brothers Jeff and Eric Clayton formed Saviour Machine in 1989. Described as a gothic and symphonic metal band as well as art rock, the group released its first self-titled album in 1993.

The year 1988 saw not only the formation of Paradise Lost but another early gothic metal pioneer, the Swedish band Tiamat. Their debut album Sumerian Cry arrived in 1990 and featured "slightly above average death metal". Their third album Clouds was released in 1993 as the band's first turning-point, "starkly reducing speed and heaviness for melody and atmosphere". The album made an impact on the European metal community for its atmospheric doom metal approach "enhanced with keyboards which are never out of place or over-used". The next album Wildhoney was unveiled in 1994 as an "artistic and commercial breakthrough, fully realizing the sound hinted at on previous releases and eliciting effusive praise in metal circles for its brooding, Gothic atmospherics". The album featured an interplay of contrasts between delicate acoustic guitar, gentle whispering vocals and angelic choruses on the one hand and massive riffs, industrial grind and death metal grunting on the other. On subsequent releases, Tiamat moved further into gothic territory with Johan Edlund "dropping the metal growling in favor of an unearthly croon". The result has seen critics comparing Edlund's vocals to the Sisters of Mercy's Andrew Eldritch, "alongside musical comparisons to Nick Cave and the Bad Seeds". The band has been recognised for producing some of the most "overtly Gothic material" from Scandinavia.

As far back as 1985, Celtic Frost had used female vocals for some songs on their To Mega Therion album. Paradise Lost began making similar use of female vocals from their very first album Lost Paradise in 1990. Inspired by the use of female vocals on Paradise Lost's second album Gothic, the Gathering released their debut album Always... in 1992 with growling vocalist Bart Smits supported by female singer Marike Groot. The music on the album was "firmly rooted in the dark, midtempo style of gothic and doom metal". Their second album Almost a Dance arrived in the following year with new vocalist Niels Duffhues, "a strange choice for the band". Duffhues' "punk-ish" and "alt-rock" style of singing was widely seen as out of place with the music, a perception that was shared by the band themselves, and the album was "largely written off as a result." The Gathering decided to drop the use of male vocals altogether and instead brought in a lead female vocalist Anneke van Giersbergen for their third full length Mandylion, an album that "saw the band adventurously breaking away from the Gothic Doom fare of previous works". The result was considered a "groundbreaking achievement" upon its release in 1995 with critics lavishly describing it as "the perfect pinnacle of gothic metal". The Gathering's "introspective atmosphere owed a creative debt to Dead Can Dance, and established them as a leading band in their native Holland [sic]".

The German band Pyogenesis has also been named as a pioneering gothic metal act.

=== Development ===
==== Beauty and the beast ====
Theatre of Tragedy's "A Hamlet for a Slothful Vassal" (1995)
A simultaneous duet between soprano and death vocals can be heard in this 24 second sample from Theatre of Tragedy's self-titled debut album.

Tristania's "Angina" (1999)
This 30 second sample from Tristania's second album Beyond the Veil feature three distinct vocal styles with a black metal shriek followed by soprano and baritone vocals.

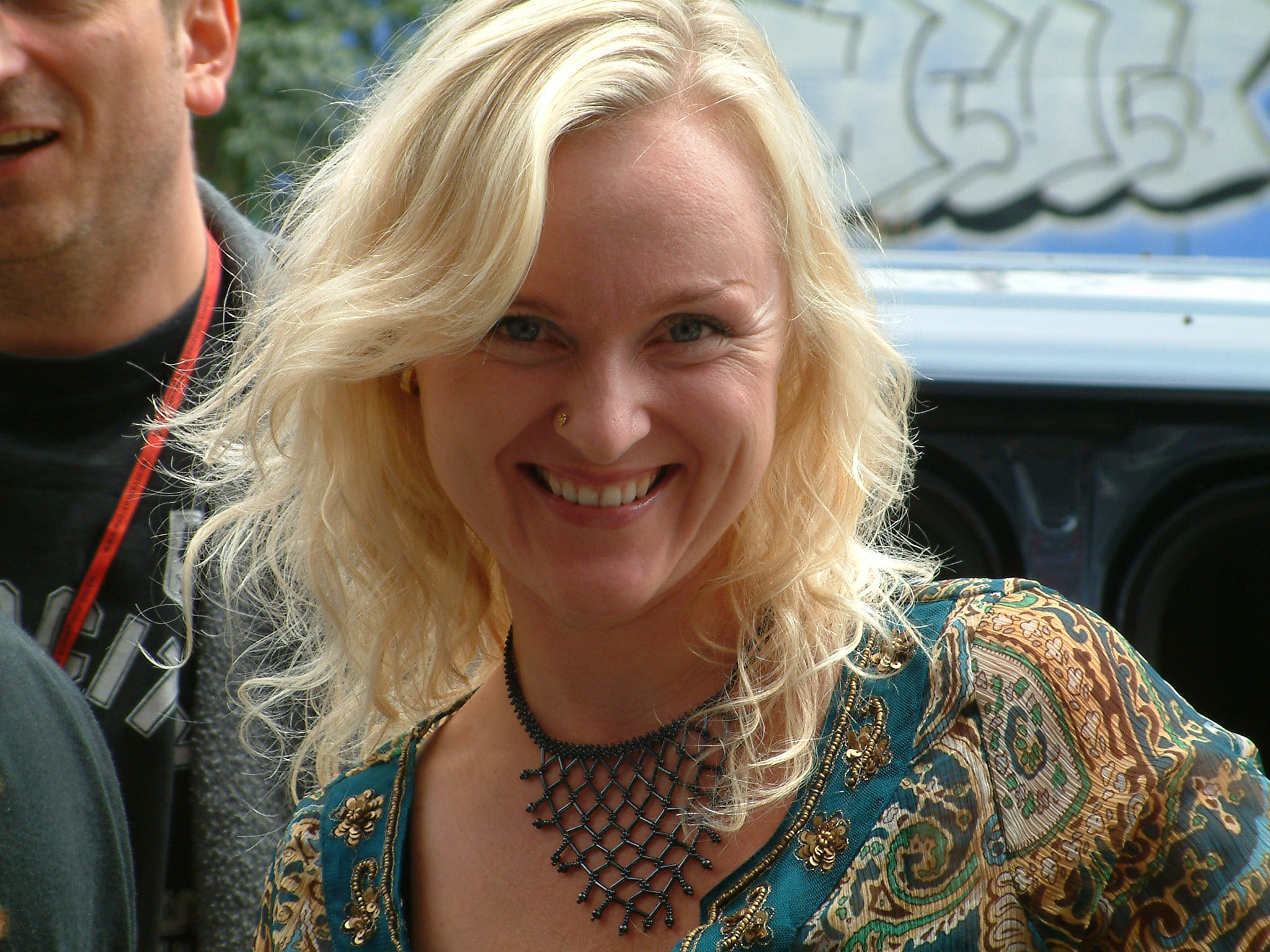
Liv Kristine helped to pioneer the beauty and the beast approach.

The term "beauty and the beast" refers to an aesthetic contrasting "angelic" female vocals with male growls or aggressive singing. Paradise Lost and the Gathering had already made use of this technique on some songs from their earlier albums, but it was the Norwegian Theatre of Tragedy that first released an entire album devoted to this approach with their self-titled debut in 1995. A second album, Velvet Darkness They Fear, arrived in the following year. Theatre of Tragedy's third album Aégis in 1998 saw the band "venturing into fresh musical territory". The piano was replaced by electronic keyboards while Raymond Rohonyi opted to discard his death growls in favour of a "soft, spoken, sometimes whispering voice". The music was more clean and soft, "stripped of guitar harshness" but with a "near flawless execution" that "prompted many European critics to award Aégis perfect review scores".

Other bands that contrast aggressive male vocals and clean female vocals continued to emerge in the late 1990s. Trail of Tears had formed in 1994 while Tristania formed in 1995 and the Sins of Thy Beloved were formed in 1996. All three Norwegian groups released their debut albums in 1998. Tristania stood apart from the others with their use of three distinct vocal styles in the "operatic soprano Vibeke Stene, clean-singing counter-tenor Østen Bergøy, and harsh, black metal-style shrieker Morten Veland". Their second album Beyond the Veil in 1999 made use of a ten members choir and featured violin passages from Pete Johansen of the Sins of Thy Beloved, earning "rave reviews" across Europe. By then, the band had risen to "the top of the goth metal heap" with their "lush, symphonically enhanced" approach. They were "dealt a potentially crippling blow" when singer, guitarist and principal composer Veland left the group to form Sirenia. Tristania has continued to prosper with subsequent releases and has since been "regarded as one of the world's premiere goth metal bands".

For over a decade, this beauty and the beast aesthetic has flourished with many representatives across the European continent. Cradle of Filth has also been known to make use of this approach through guest female vocalists such as Liv Kristine and Sarah Jezebel Deva. A few critics have since lamented that the approach has been "done to death by countless bands".

==== Symphonic gothic metal ====
Symphonic gothic metal is a subgenre of gothic metal that emerged in the 1990s and incorporates symphonic and orchestral elements, as well as heavy usage of atmospheric keyboarding in the music, akin to symphonic black metal. The symphonic aspects of this genre are normally integral parts of a band, and as such are commonly used throughout the whole duration of a song. Several of the most notable symphonic gothic metal bands are Saviour Machine, Theatre of Tragedy, Leaves' Eyes, Xandria, Trail of Tears, After Forever, Epica, and Therion.

=== Commercial success ===
==== Paradise Lost ====
With the release of their sixth album One Second in 1997, Paradise Lost brought a more commercial and pop-oriented direction to the genre they had helped create but the success of Draconian Times has not been overcome. Praised by Eduardo Rivadavia of Allmusic as a "radical but impressive departure", the album drew comparisons to Depeche Mode with nothing remaining "of their early death/doom metal origins". Subsequent albums "progressively experimented with electronics and pop elements, with the guitars gradually getting pushed further into the background". The result was "an accessible sound and a strong emphasis on catchy choruses". Despite attaining "a huge reputation in Europe, where all of their albums have sold strongly", the group's status as "the progenitors of gothic metal" has been "constantly overlooked, both in their homeland and the US, possibly because of their determination to never make the same record twice".

==== Cradle of Filth ====
In contrast, Cradle of Filth has become "one of the very biggest names" in their black metal genre with impressive albums sales and mainstream appearances on MTV, a level of success that has attracted accusations of "selling out" by the "black metal faithful".

==== Moonspell and Within Temptation ====
Moonspell too has "lost a lot of fans who couldn't keep up with the changes" to their music. In the opinion of vocalist Fernando Ribeiro, fans of the early 1990s were "less cynical and more open-minded in their hearts and minds" than they are in 2007. Nonetheless, the band has continued to experience success with their 2006 album Memorial debuting at number 1 on their native Portuguese charts. They were rewarded with the "Best Portuguese Act" award at the 2006 MTV European Music Awards, a feat matched by Within Temptation in the following year with the "Best Dutch & Belgian Act" award. Within Temptation further received recognition as their country's best selling artist at the 2007 World Music Awards.

==== Lacuna Coil ====
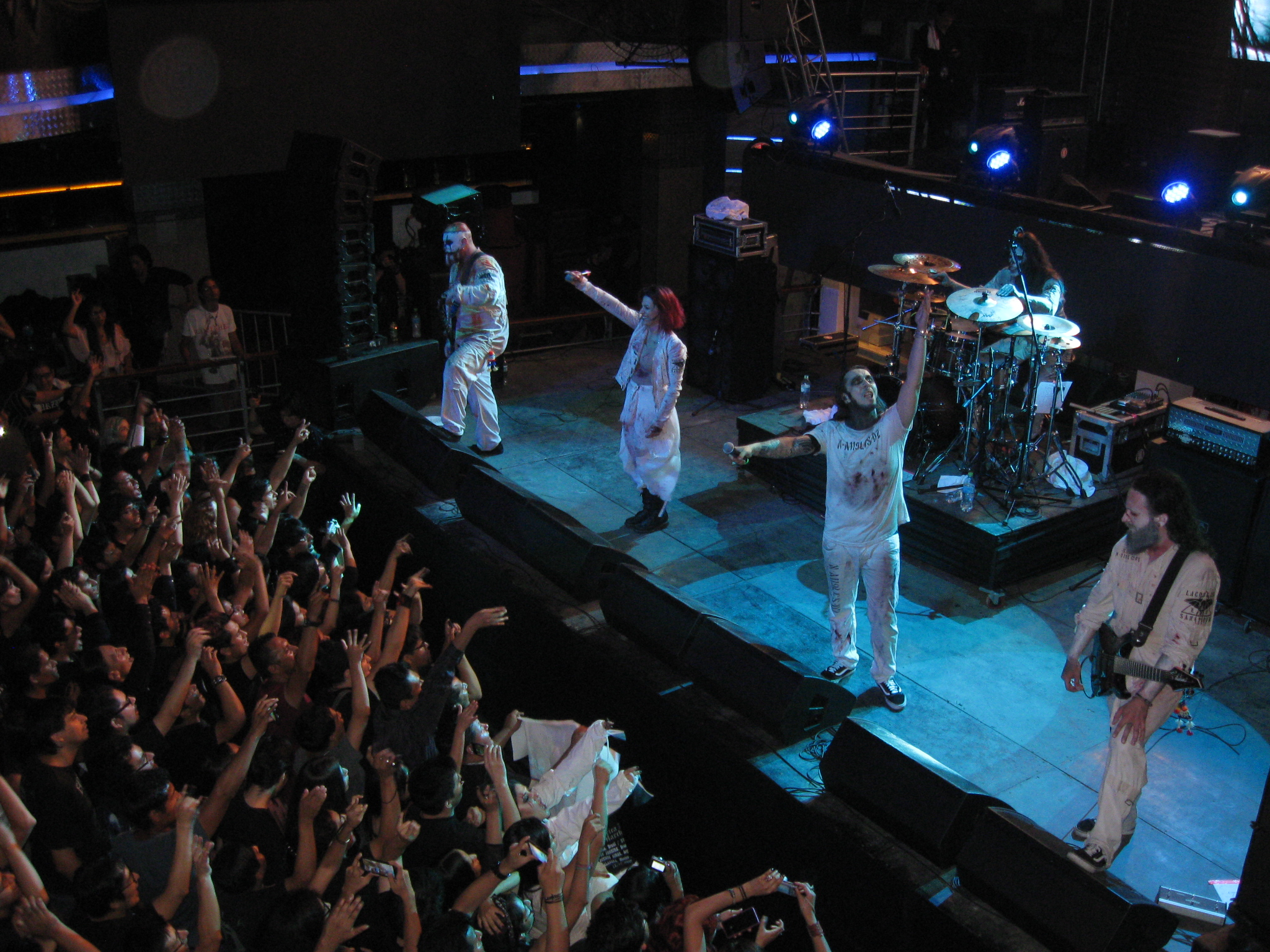
Lacuna Coil performing in Lima, Peru, in 2017

The Italian band Lacuna Coil has also become a "premiere act" of the gothic metal genre. The group employs both a female vocalist Cristina Scabbia and a male vocalist Andrea Ferro, although the group uses less of a 'beauty and the beast' style, with Ferro primarily using clean vocals. Formed in Milan in 1994, they released a demo tape in 1996 strongly influenced by Paradise Lost and Type O Negative. The band "turned a lot of heads in Italy's ambient/goth scene" with their self-titled EP in 1998. Their debut album In a Reverie was released in 1999 with a style that bore "some similarities to contemporaries like the Gathering and Moonspell". Lacuna Coil's music was also "more accessible than many of their peers". A second album, Unleashed Memories, arrived in 2001, but it was their third full-length, Comalies, that became their breakthrough album, "highly praised by the metal world after its release in October 2002". On the strength of Comalies, Lacuna Coil became the most successful artist in the history of their label Century Media Records as well as the highest selling rock act in their home country Italy. The band has also achieved the distinction of being the first and, as of late 2007, the only European gothic metal band to successfully break into the United States market with radio airplay and impressive album sales. Their highly anticipated fourth album Karmacode was even more successful, debuting at number 28 on the Billboard charts, and also debuting on many European music charts. The Comalies and Karmacode albums "reportedly sold nearly 1 million units combined worldwide, a good chunk of that in the States". The band has also performed on the main stage of the American heavy metal festival Ozzfest. Their next two albums, Shallow Life and Dark Adrenaline, debuted at number 16 and number 15, respectively, on the Billboard charts.

==== Evanescence ====
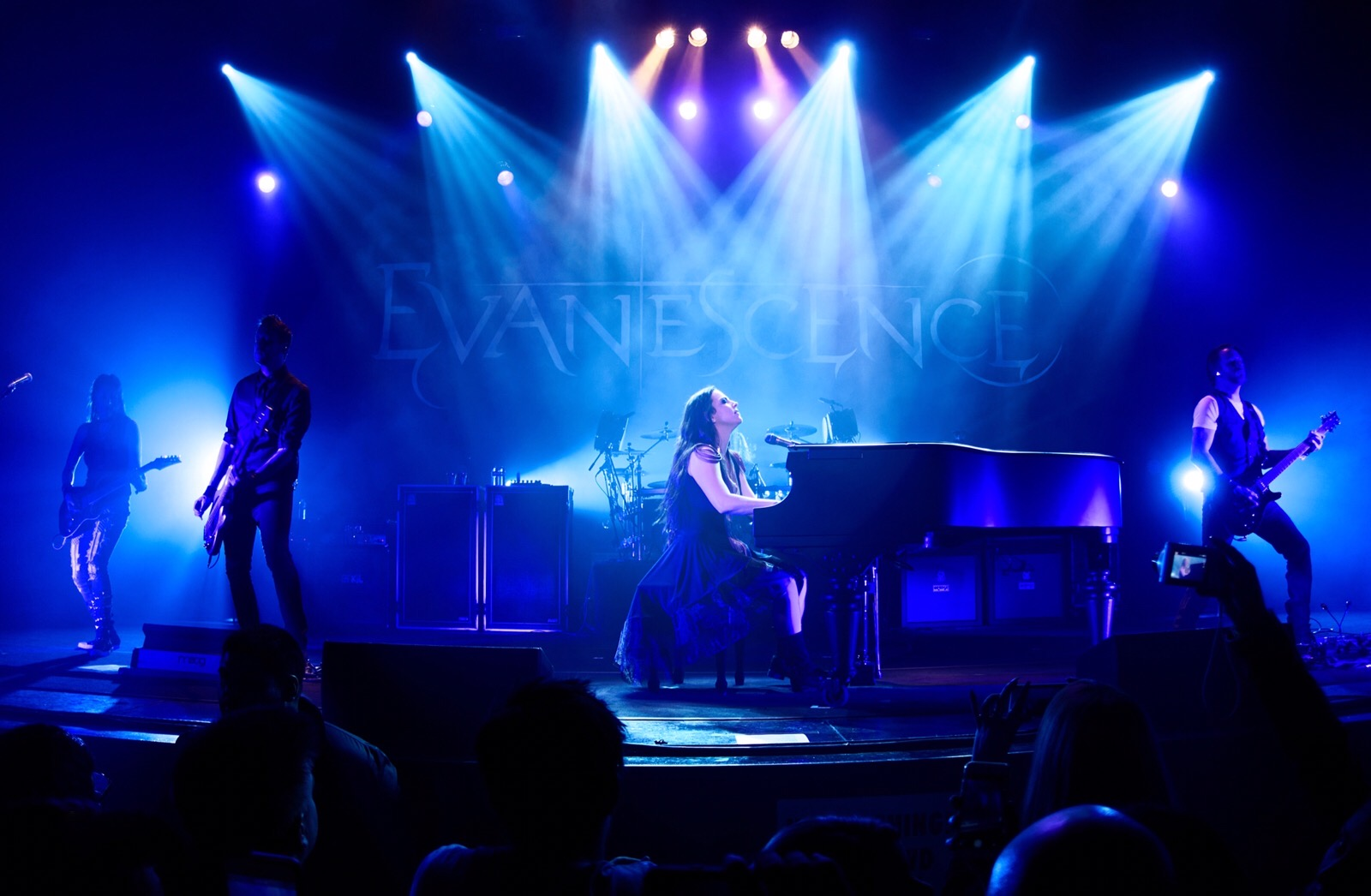
Evanescence performing live at The Wiltern theatre in Los Angeles, California on Tuesday 17 November 2015.

In 2003, the rock group Evanescence from Arkansas, United States also found commercial success with the release of their debut album Fallen, which has been described as a blend of gothic and alternative metal and drawing comparisons to other alternative metal acts like P.O.D. and Linkin Park. In October 2011, Evanescence's self-titled album was released and represented a mix of gothic nu metal and hard rock. Further comparisons have since been drawn between Evanescence and gothic metal groups like Within Temptation and Lacuna Coil. Critic Adrien Begrand of PopMatters wryly notes that while Lacuna Coil "had been tirelessly building a fanbase in Europe since the late 1990s with their listener-friendly brand of goth metal", they had been overshadowed by "a bunch of corn-fed kids from Arkansas with a big publicity machine behind them [taking] the very sound the Italian sextet had helped pioneer, and present it to the American suburban goth kids in a much more pop-oriented, dumbed down variation". Cammila Albertson of Allmusic similarly locates Evanescence as one step further from gothic metal, offering the description of the band as "a pop version of an already diluted brand of metal". While Fernando Ribeiro of Moonspell contends that Evanescence is not a metal band, publications such as the New York Times, Rough Guides, Rolling Stone and Blender have nonetheless identified Evanescence as a gothic metal act. Adrian Jackson, former bassist My Dying Bride feels the American group is doing something similar to My Dying Bride's music, only in a more accessible direction. Gregor Mackintosh of Paradise Lost notes a generation gap between his group and Evanescence, suggesting that Paradise Lost has only influenced Evanescence indirectly through other acts like Lacuna Coil. The success of Evanescence has been recognised for opening "new grounds" for gothic metal bands to "explore and conquer".

==== HIM ====
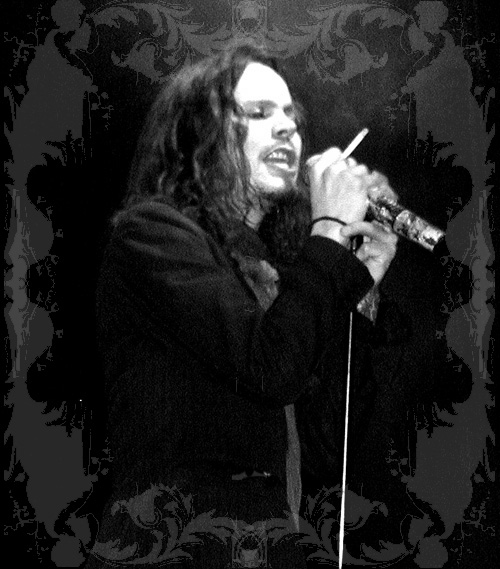
Ville Valo of HIM cites Type O Negative and the Peaceville Three as some of his influences.

Another act that has attracted both commercial success and controversy is the band HIM. The group has "not only dominated the charts in their native Finland but also across Europe and in particular Germany". Their debut album arrived in 1997 as Greatest Lovesongs Vol. 666 with music that "combines metal with '80s rock and some goth influences". HIM began moving towards a more "polished pop" direction on their next album Razorblade Romance in 2000. The band describes their "Sabbath-meets-Depeche Mode sound" as love metal, the title of their fourth album in 2003. Their subsequent release two years later Dark Light was their breakthrough album in the United States with a debut at number 18 on the Billboard charts, a feat exceeded when their next album Venus Doom in 2007 made a debut at number 12. Critic Lance Teegarden of PopMatters notes that HIM is "not the sort of act that conjures up a lukewarm response [as] people either like them or discredit them outright".

==== Finnish scene ====
In the 21st century, gothic metal has enjoyed a strong mainstream presence in Finland with many representatives enjoying commercial success. In addition to the aforementioned HIM, the bands Charon, Entwine, For My Pain..., Lullacry, Poisonblack, Sentenced, The 69 Eyes and To/Die/For have all found their singles or albums hitting the top ten of the Finnish charts. Of these bands, Sentenced notably formed as far back as 1989 with their early albums in the melodic and blackened death metal vein. For My Pain... was formed as a supergroup with members from other prominent bands in Finland including Nightwish, Embraze, Eternal Tears of Sorrow and Reflexion.

== See also ==
- List of gothic festivals
- List of gothic metal bands
- Goth subculture
- Gothic rock
