= Souvenirs (The Gathering album) =

Studio album by The Gathering
- Released: 24 February 2003
- Studio: E-Sound, Weesp, Loud and; A1 Studio, Amsterdam, The Netherlands
- Genre: Alternative rock; trip hop
- Length: 59:25
- Label: Psychonaut
- Producer: Zlaya Hadzich

The Gathering chronology
| Black Light District (2002) | Souvenirs (2003) | Sleepy Buildings – A Semi Acoustic Evening (2004) |

Professional ratings
Review scores
| Source | Rating |
|---|---|
| AllMusic | 4.5/5 stars |
| Chronicles of Chaos | 8/10 |
| Rock Hard | 9.0/10 |

Souvenirs is the seventh studio album by Dutch rock band The Gathering. It was released on 24 February 2003 through independent label Psychonaut Records; the label was founded by the band in 1999.

== Overview ==
Souvenirs is the first album release from The Gathering since parting ways with Century Media, and the first album for Psychonaut Records. The album was recorded at E-Sound, Weesp, Loud Amsterdam and A1 Amsterdam during 2002 and 2003 under the guidance of producer Zlaya Hadzich. The album was engineered by Zlaya Hadzich, Sietze Gardenier, David Klooker & Ignaz Bruens; mixed at A1, Loud & E-Sound by Zlaya Hadzich, René Rutten & Michael Buyens; and mastered by Alan Ward at Electric City.

Many speculate that it was the new experimental directions of the group, as well as the inability of the label to market them that signaled the end of their contract with Century Media.

This is the last studio album to feature original bassist Hugo Prinsen Geerligs until Beautiful Distortion which was released in 2022.

== Track listing ==
All music is composed by The Gathering and Zlaya Hadzich.

| No. | Title | Lyrics | Length |
|---|---|---|---|
| 1. | "These Good People" | Anneke van Giersbergen | 5:55 |
| 2. | "Even the Spirits Are Afraid" | Anneke van Giersbergen | 5:13 |
| 3. | "Broken Glass" | Anneke van Giersbergen | 4:59 |
| 4. | "You Learn About It" | Anneke van Giersbergen | 5:09 |
| 5. | "Souvenirs" | Anneke van Giersbergen | 6:07 |
| 6. | "We Just Stopped Breathing" | Zlaya Hadzich | 6:52 |
| 7. | "Monsters" | Zlaya Hadzich | 5:02 |
| 8. | "Golden Grounds" | Anneke van Giersbergen | 4:53 |
| 9. | "Jelena" | Anneke van Giersbergen | 6:10 |
| 10. | "A Life All Mine" | Trickster G., Anneke van Giersbergen | 5:08 |

Bonus track
| No. | Title | Lyrics | Length |
|---|---|---|---|
| 11. | "Telson" | Anneke van Giersbergen | 2:08 |

Notes

- On the CD version, "Telson" appears as a hidden track in the pregap. On the vinyl edition of this album, "Telson" is the final bonus track. There is a four-minute pregap between "Jelena" and "A Life All Mine" that often elongates the length of "Jelena" when the disc is ripped (pregaps are usually appended to the previous track in this process).
- There's also a promo CD version with only the first 8 tracks. "Monsters" and "We Just Stopped Breathing" are swapped, and "Monsters" is only 4:18 long.

== Charts ==
| Chart (2003) | Peak position |
|---|---|
| Dutch Albums Chart | 47 |
| German Albums Chart | 90 |

== Personnel ==
The Gathering

- Anneke van Giersbergen – lead vocals/guitars
- René Rutten – guitars
- Frank Boeijen – keyboards
- Hugo Prinsen Geerligs – bass
- Hans Rutten – drums

Guests

- Kristoffer Rygg – lyrics and vocals on "A Life All Mine"
- Kristin Fjellseth – choirs on "You Learn About It"
- Wouter Planteijdt – electric and acoustic guitars on "These Good People" and "You Learn About It"
- Mathias Eick – trumpet on "We Just Stopped Breathing"
- Kid Sublime – beats on "We Just Stopped Breathing"
- Michael Buyens – bass guitar on "You Learn About It" and "Monsters"
- Zlaya Hadzich – lyrics on "Monsters" and "We Just Stopped Breathing"

Production

- Artwork, Design – iNDEX Utrecht
- Composed by, performer, Arranged By – The Gathering, Zlaya Hadzich
- Engineer – David Klooker, Ignaz Bruens, Sietze Gardenier, Zlaya Hadzich
- Lyrics by – Anneke van Giersbergen (tracks: 1 to 5, 8 to 10), Trickster G. (tracks: 10), Zlaya Hadzich (tracks: 6, 7)
- Mastered by – Alan Ward
- Mixed by – Michael Buyens, René Rutten, Zlaya Hadzich
- Photography by – Esther Marbus
- Photography by [Flowers] – Niels Coppes
- Producer – Zlaya Hadzich
