= The West Pole =

Studio album by The Gathering
- Released: 4 May 2009
- Recorded: 2008
- Genre: Alternative rock, post-rock, shoegaze
- Length: 54:01
- Label: Psychonaut
- Producer: René Rutten

The Gathering chronology
Home (2006)	The West Pole (2009)	City from Above (2009)

Professional ratings
Review scores
Source	Rating
AllMusic	3/5 stars
Rock Sound	8/10 stars
Sputnikmusic	4/5 stars
Blogcritics	(Positive)
Sea of Tranquility	4/5 stars
MusicTAP	4/5 stars
Lords of Metal	(89/100)
Gravemusic	8/10 stars
Dangerdog Music	3.5/5 stars

The West Pole is the ninth studio album by the Dutch rock band The Gathering. It is the first album to feature the new vocalist Silje Wergeland, previous frontwoman of Norwegian gothic metal band Octavia Sperati. This album also includes two guest singers, Dutch Anne van den Hoogen and Mexican Marcela Bovio (Stream of Passion), as well as other guest musicians. Music videos were made of the songs "All You Are" and "No Bird Call".

== Track listing ==
No.	Title	Lyrics	Music	Length
1.	"When Trust Becomes Sound"	Instrumental	René Rutten	3:53
2.	"Treasure"	Silje Wergeland	René Rutten	4:06
3.	"All You Are"	Silje Wergeland	René Rutten	4:34
4.	"The West Pole"	Silje Wergeland	René Rutten	6:35
5.	"No Bird Call"	Silje Wergeland	Frank Boeijen	5:38
6.	"Capital of Nowhere"	Anne van den Hoogen	René Rutten	6:35
7.	"You Promised Me a Symphony"	Silje Wergeland	Silje Wergeland	2:54
8.	"Pale Traces"	Marcela Bovio	Frank Boeijen	7:46
9.	"No One Spoke"	Silje Wergeland	Frank Boeijen	4:32
10.	"A Constant Run"	Silje Wergeland	Frank Boeijen	7:44
Total length:				54:01

== Charts ==
Chart (2009)	Peak position
Dutch Albums Chart	98

== Personnel ==
Band members

- Silje Wergeland – vocals and grand piano
- René Rutten – electric and acoustic guitars, stylophone
- Frank Boeijen – keyboards, piano, harmonium and vibraphone
- Marjolein Kooijman – bass guitar
- Hans Rutten – drums and percussions

Additional musicians

- Marcela Bovio – vocals on track 8
- Anne van den Hoogen – vocals on track 6, megaphone nonsense on track 1 and megaphone backing vocals on track 2
- Jos van den Dungen – violin and viola on tracks 2, 3, 4, 5 and 8
- John Mitchell – cello on tracks 3, 4, 5 and 8
- Marije de Jong and Jonas Pap – narrative on track 4
