= Black Light District (EP) =

EP by The Gathering
- Released: 17 June 2002
- Recorded: E-sound, Loud & Morningsun Studios, 2001 and 2002
- Genre: Progressive rock; trip hop
- Length: 24:28
- Label: Psychonaut Records
- Producer: Zlaya Hadzich

The Gathering chronology
If Then Else (2000)	Black Light District (2002)	Souvenirs (2003)

Black Light District (2002) is an EP by the Dutch rock band The Gathering. It was first made available as an internet-only release on 24 June 2002 and officially went in distribution on 16 September 2002. The EP marks a 12½-year anniversary of the band, and also the end of their five-album contract with Century Media Records. Black Light District was released under The Gathering's own label Psychonaut Records, and it is the label's first completely new release, however, since an EP does not qualify as an album, the later released Souvenirs is widely regarded as the first new album release of the label.

== Track listing ==
No.	Title	Lyrics	Music	Length
1.	"Black Light District"	Anneke van Giersbergen	The Gathering	16:22
2.	"Debris"	Zlaya Hadzich/Anneke van Giersbergen	The Gathering	4:35
3.	"Broken Glass (Piano Version)"	Anneke van Giersbergen	The Gathering	3:30
Total length:				24:28

- Spoken parts on "Black Light District" are performed by Sarah Jezebel Deva.
- The CD also contains a hidden track which, according to the band, is titled "Over You", and a multimedia part featuring an extensive video of the band working on the mini-album and tracks from their following full-length album Souvenirs.

== Personnel ==
- Anneke van Giersbergen – vocals
- René Rutten – guitars
- Frank Boeijen – synthesizer, keyboards
- Hugo Prinsen Geerligs – bass
- Hans Rutten – drums
