= Home (The Gathering album) =

Studio album by The Gathering
- Released: 15 April 2006 (except North America); 18 April 2006 (North America)
- Recorded: 2005–2006
- Studio: La Divina Commedia Church in Maurik, Netherlands
- Genre: Alternative rock; progressive rock
- Length: 60:25
- Label: Noise/Sanctuary (except North America); The End Records (North America)
- Producer: Attie Bauw

The Gathering chronology
| Sleepy Buildings – A Semi Acoustic Evening (2004) | Home (2006) | The West Pole (2009) |

Professional ratings
Review scores
| Source | Rating |
|---|---|
| AllMusic | 4.5/5 stars |
| Metal Storm | 8.5/10 |
| Rock Hard | 8.0/10 |

Home is the eighth studio album by Dutch band The Gathering. The album was released on 15 April 2006 by Sanctuary Records through its heavy metal label Noise. The album had a separate release in North America which took place on 18 April 2006 by Brooklyn-based label The End Records. It was the last album to feature lead singer and lyricist Anneke van Giersbergen.

In an interview for the San Diego–based magazine Modern Fix, drummer Hans Rutten described Home as being "more stripped-down...Souvenirs was quite structured and was quite heavy to make. This one is more simple, I think, but still there, still in a Gathering kind of way. But rhythmically speaking, it's more stripped-down, it's more primitive, I think. I think 'primitive' is a good word...it's more instinctive (and) more primitive. It's not as layered as Souvenirs, and maybe it's less 'trippish.' Maybe it's more...yeah, primitive trip-rock, something like that."

== Track listing ==
All lyrics are written by Anneke van Giersbergen; all music is composed by The Gathering.

| No. | Title | Length |
|---|---|---|
| 1. | "Shortest Day" | 4:13 |
| 2. | "In Between" | 4:44 |
| 3. | "Alone" | 4:57 |
| 4. | "Waking Hour" | 5:38 |
| 5. | "Fatigue" | 1:49 |
| 6. | "A Noise Severe" | 6:07 |
| 7. | "Forgotten" | 3:25 |
| 8. | "Solace" | 3:51 |
| 9. | "Your Troubles Are Over" | 3:46 |
| 10. | "Box" | 4:44 |
| 11. | "The Quiet One" | 2:16 |
| 12. | "Home" | 6:58 |
| 13. | "Forgotten Reprise" | 7:59 |
| Total length: | | 60:25 |

== Charts ==
| Chart (2006) | Peak position |
|---|---|
| Dutch Albums Chart | 34 |
| French Albums Chart | 58 |
| Hungarian Albums Chart | 31 |

== Personnel ==
- Anneke van Giersbergen – vocals, guitars
- René Rutten – guitars, flute
- Marjolein Kooijman – bass
- Hans Rutten – drums
- Frank Boeijen – keyboards

Production

- Artwork – Michel de Klein
- Lyrics by – Anneke van Giersbergen
- Mastered by – Darius van Helfteren
- Photography by [cover picture taken by] – Thomas Rausch
- Producer, engineer, mixed by – Attie Bauw
