= The Gathering (band) =

Dutch rock band

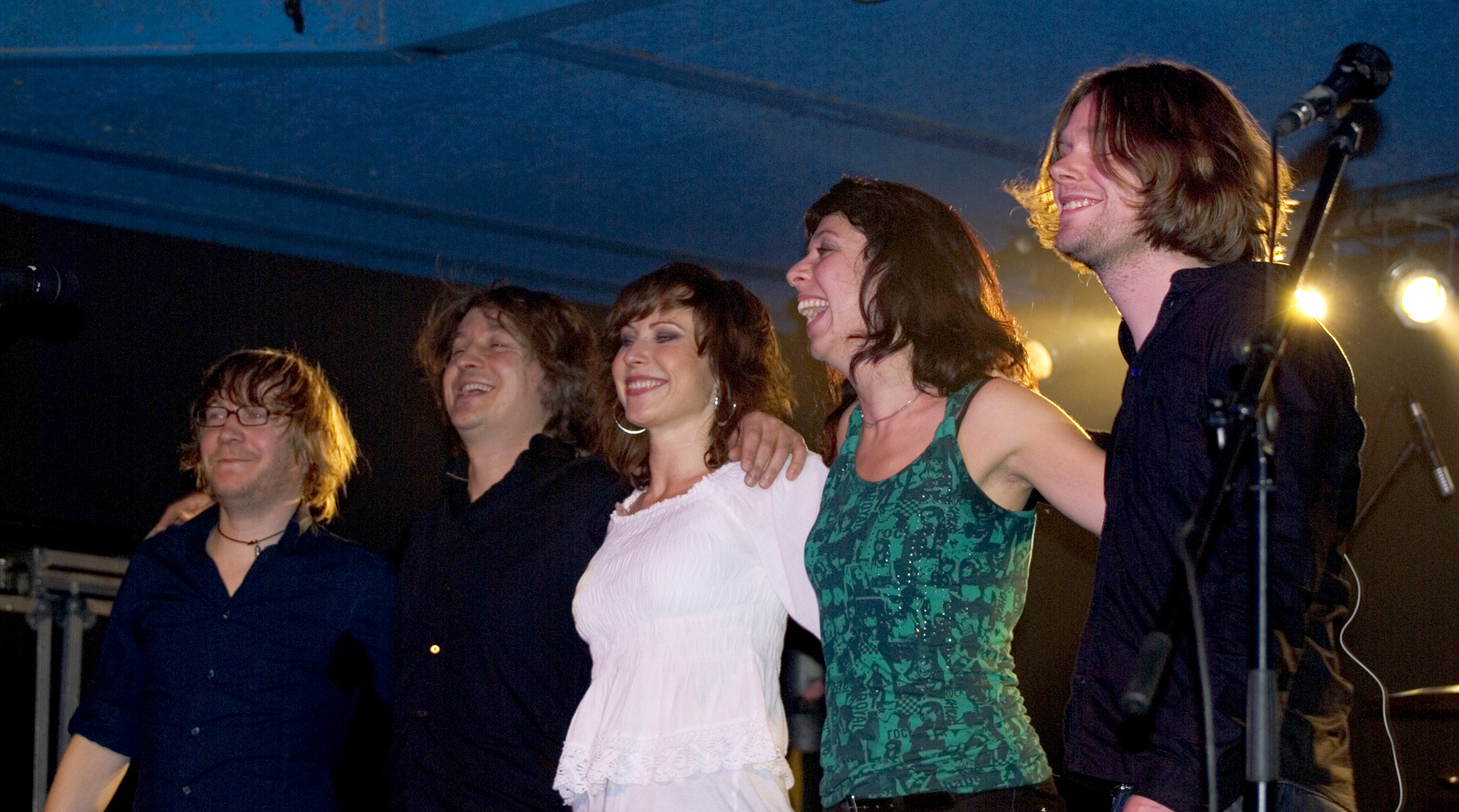
- Budapest concert, 31 January 2010

Background information
- Origin: Oss, Netherlands
- Genres: Electronic rock; progressive rock; alternative rock; trip hop; shoegaze; gothic metal (early); death-doom (early)
- Years active: 1989–2014; 2018–present
- Labels: Century Media; Psychonaut; Hammerheart; Sanctuary; The End; Foundation 2000; Season of Mist; Alone
- Members: René Rutten; Hans Rutten; Frank Boeijen; Anneke van Giersbergen; Hugo Prinsen Geerligs
- Past members: Jelmer Wiersma; Bart Smits; Marike Groot; Niels Duffhues; Martine van Loon; Silje Wergeland; Marjolein Kooijman
- Website: www.gathering.nl

The Gathering are a Dutch rock band formed in Oss, North Brabant in 1989. The band's lineup currently consists of founding brothers René Rutten (guitars) and Hans Rutten (drums), Hugo Prinsen Geerligs (bass) and Frank Boeijen (keyboards), with former lead vocalist Anneke van Giersbergen currently a touring member.

The band's earliest releases were categorized as atmospheric doom metal with influences from extreme metal acts like Celtic Frost and Hellhammer. They underwent numerous vocalist changes before breaking out in 1995 with Mandylion. It was The Gathering's first album to feature lead singer Anneke van Giersbergen and the first to chart in the Netherlands. With van Giersbergen, the band's sound shifted from gothic metal to one influenced by shoegaze, post-rock and trip hop, starting with their fifth studio album, How to Measure a Planet?, in 1998.

In 2007, van Giersbergen left the group to focus on her new project, Agua de Annique. Norwegian singer Silje Wergeland of the band Octavia Sperati replaced her in 2009. They released their first album with her, The West Pole, later that year. The band released three albums with Wergeland. Van Giersbergen toured with The Gathering in 2025 to celebrate the 30th anniversary of Mandylion. Wergeland left the band at the end of the year.

== History ==
=== Early years (1989–1994) ===
Brothers Hans and René Rutten and vocalist Bart Smits founded by The Gathering in Oss in 1989. Hugo Prinsen Geerligs, Jelmer Wiersma and Frank Boeijen joined them to complete their first line-up. The Gathering's earliest recordings were categorized as atmospheric doom metal with influences from death metal acts like Celtic Frost and Hellhammer.

In 1990, they recorded the demo An Imaginary Symphony, which met positive reactions from the underground metal scene due to their unusual use of keyboards in metal music. They recorded a second demo, "Moonlight Archer", in April 1991. Several music journalists picked it up. Both demos were poorly produced but helped establish the band's name on the live circuit, opening for bands such as Dead Head, Invocator, Samael, Morbid Angel and Death.

After signing with Foundation 2000, the group released their debut album, Always..., in 1992. On this album, Marike Groot accompanied Bart Smits on vocals. Groot joined the Gathering on stage for most shows. The album sold nearly 20,000 units over the next few years in Europe. In 1992, Smits and Groot left the group due to musical differences. The other members wanted a lighter, more progressive sound. Smits went on to form his own project, Wish, to explore a darker, heavier sound.

In 1993, the group recruited vocalists Niels Duffhues and female counterpart Martine van Loon. They recorded and released a second album, Almost a Dance, in 1993 by Foundation 2000. The album met criticism aimed at Duffhues' punk-ish tone being out of step with the music. The album was largely written off as a result. The group acknowledged their disappointment with the album and started writing new material and looked for a new vocalist.

=== Century Media years (1995–2001) ===
In 1995, The Gathering released Mandylion, their third album and first to feature lead vocalist Anneke van Giersbergen, through Century Media. It was their breakthrough, selling over 130,000 copies in Europe. Two singles were released from Mandylion, "Adrenaline/Leaves" and "Strange Machines", the latter of which reached number 37 on the Dutch singles charts and helped raise the group's popularity in Europe and the United States. Tours of Belgium and Germany, as well as appearances at the Dynamo Open Air and Pinkpop Festivals, further established the band's presence in the European metal scene. The 1997 album Nighttime Birds was stylistically and musically a companion piece to Mandylion and sold over 90,000 copies. The group toured throughout Europe.

In 1998, the group acknowledged their growing influences and their need to experiment with a double album, How to Measure a Planet?. Attie Bauw produced the album, which was a radical departure from the group's established sound. Upon release, the album received excellent reviews from critics who appreciated the band's absorption of new styles such as shoegaze and trip hop into its sound. Positive reactions came from all over the world, including the United States, where they played 14 shows during the summer of 1999.

In 1999, the band formed their own record label, Psychonaut Records, to release their music and take creative control over marketing and distribution. They remastered and re-released Always... in 1999 and Almost a Dance in 2000, both with new artwork. The band remained under contract with Century Media. They released the live album Superheat (2000), recorded in several Dutch venues during 1999.

The Gathering released If Then Else in 2000. The album is intense and emotional, more compact than its predecessor. They toured for fifteen months, traveling to several countries of Europe, going to Mexico, and ending with a small Dutch club tour in October 2001. The Gathering became increasingly popular in South America with these atmospheric trip hop albums.

=== Independent years (2002–2008) ===
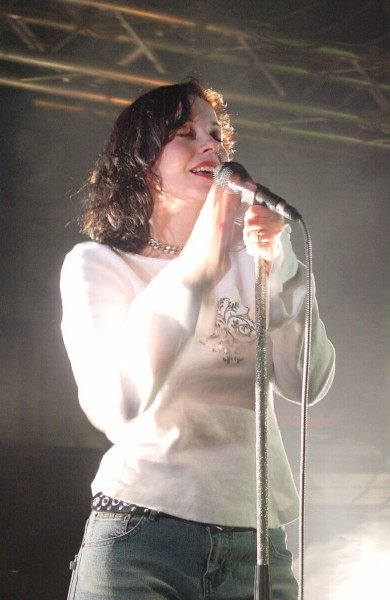
Anneke van Giersbergen in 2003

In 2002, the band took a break and tended to their private lives. During this period, they ended their contract with Century Media. The Gathering had to run their newborn label Psychonaut Records. To celebrate their 12½-year anniversary, they released the mini-CD Black Light District on their own label.

They released Souvenirs in 2003. Sleepy Buildings, a semi-acoustic live album, followed in 2004. This was the last album featuring bassist Hugo Prinsen Geerligs. Marjolein Kooijman replaced him.

In 2005, The Gathering provided the music for the CD-ROM "Passengers in Time: The Musical History Tour". This CD accompanied a history study book that Professor Wim Kratsborn wrote. The band did not consider it an official release.

The band released a DVD in 2005, A Sound Relief. This contained gentle semi-acoustic songs. But this was not their first DVD. Century Media had released In Motion without the band's permission in 2001. Nevertheless In Motion had an acceptable success. The next plan was to release in 2007 a second DVD (recognized for the band) A Noise Severe which features the more hard rock sound of The Gathering. This DVD was recorded in Santiago, Chile at 24 March 2007 at the Caupolicán Theatre.

In April 2006 they released their eighth studio album called Home. They had toured in March in North and South America and, after a brief pause to let van Giersbergen treat a laryngitis problem, they continued their touring schedule with European dates and music festivals throughout 2006.

In May 2007, The Gathering joined Lacuna Coil, In This Moment and Stolen Babies on "The Hottest Chicks in Metal" tour in the United States, sponsored by Revolver. On 5 June 2007, it was announced that Anneke was leaving The Gathering to spend more time with her family and her new project, Agua de Annique. Their final performance before Anneke's departure took place on 4 August 2007, at the Ankkarock festival in Finland.

=== Silje Wergeland era (2009–2025) ===
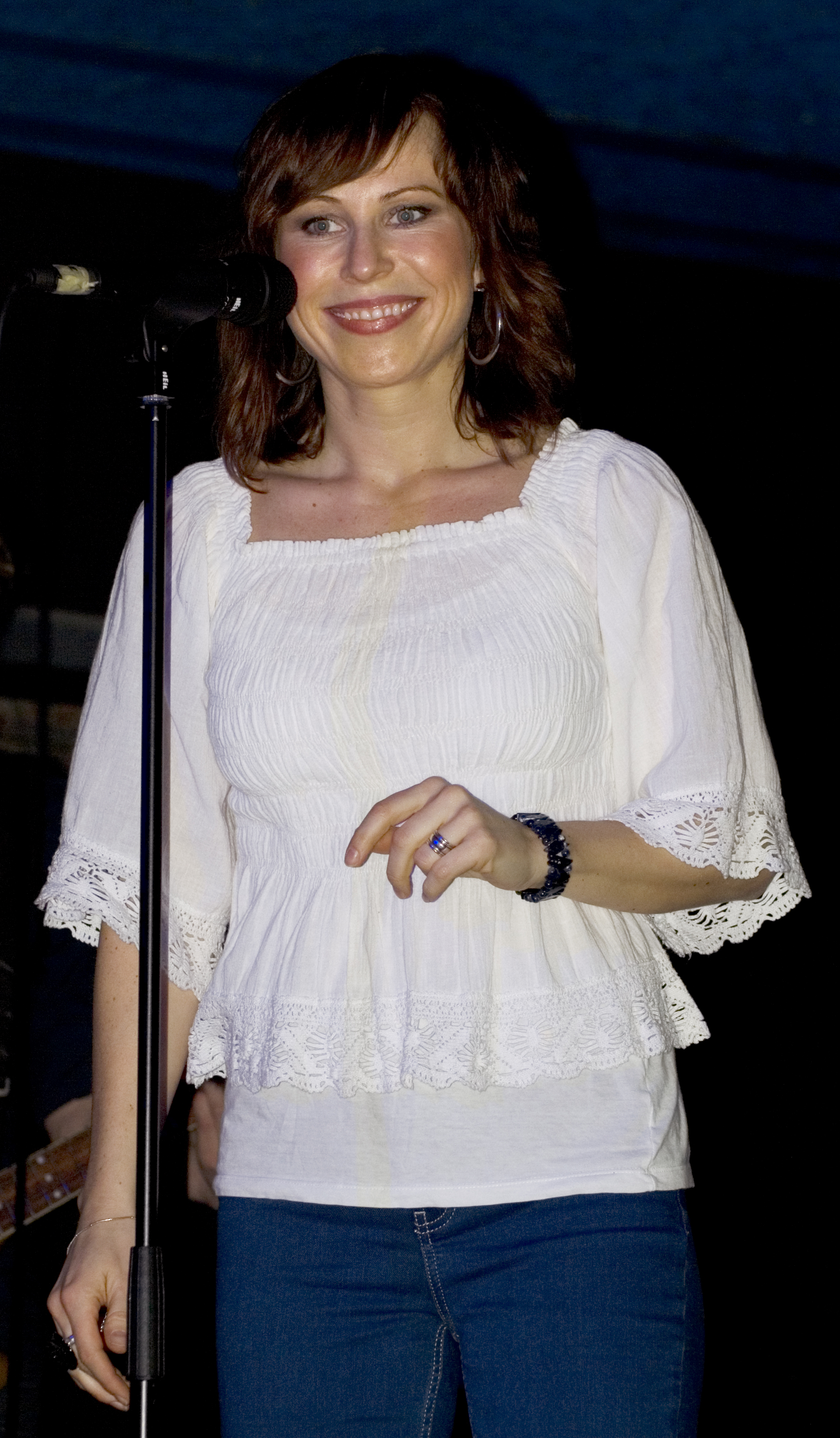
Silje Wergeland in Budapest, 2010

In March 2009, The Gathering announced Norwegian singer Silje Wergeland, of the band Octavia Sperati, as their new lead vocalist. Their ninth album, and first with Wergeland, was titled The West Pole and released in May 2009.

On 16 May 2011, the band released the single "Heroes for Ghosts" via their Bandcamp page, as well as announcing a South American tour. This was the lead single to their tenth studio album Disclosure, released on 12 September 2012. In 2013, the band released Afterwords, which features alternate versions of several songs from Disclosure. Drummer Hans Rutten referred to it as more of an EP than a proper album.

In January 2014, the band announced the departure of bassist Marjolein Kooijman after 10 years and an incoming hiatus at the end of the year.

The Gathering celebrated their 25th birthday with two sold-out reunion concerts at Doornroosje in Nijmegen on 9 November 2014. It was the first time that four of their singers (Bart Smits, Marike Groot, Anneke van Giersbergen and Silje Wergeland) performed together, and the band's first performance with van Giersbergen since her departure in 2007.

The Gathering returned from their hiatus in June 2018, with their first announced show at the Midsummer Prog Festival in Valkenburg. On 29 April 2022, the band released their eleventh studio album, and first in nearly 10 years, Beautiful Distortion. It was preceded by the lead single "We Rise", released in February.

=== Mandylion anniversary tour (2025–present) ===
In December 2024, the band announced that, to celebrate the 30th anniversary of Mandylion, they would reunite with van Giersbergen for five sold-out August 2025 shows in Nijmegen. The band then announced a full worldwide 2026 Mandylion tour with van Giersbergen.

On 28 December 2025, vocalist Silje Wergeland announced her departure from the band after 16 years "to move on to new ventures." There was no indication if van Giersbergen's temporary return influenced her decision.

On 12 October 2026, the Gathering released Echoes of Mandylion, a live album from their August 2025 shows in Nijmegen. The Mandylion 30th anniversary tour is scheduled to end on 16 January 2027 at AFAS Live in Amsterdam, where the band will also play Nighttime Birds.

== Etymology ==
Frank Boeijen on the origins of the name of the band:

"The name the Gathering has been made like eleven years ago when we started this band. We were all between 15 and 17. We were watching a lot of movies those days. One of the movies spoke about immortality and that you could kill the immortals with cutting their head off [it's the first Highlander Frank is speaking about]. In the first part of the movie, they speak a lot about the gathering. There will be a gathering once with all the immortals. We thought it was a nice name for a band, and that's how we created this name. And you can feel it's a cool name for five people who come together to make fine music." [sic]

== Band members ==
Current
- René Rutten – guitars, theremin, flute, keyboards, percussion (1989–present)
- Hans Rutten – drums (1989–present)
- Hugo Prinsen Geerligs – bass, guitar, flute, additional keyboards, percussion (1989–2004; guest 2014; 2018–present)
- Frank Boeijen – keyboards, synthesizer (1990–present)
- Jelmer Wiersma – guitars (1989–1998; guest 2014, 2025-present)
- Anneke van Giersbergen – lead vocals, guitars (1994–2007; guest 2014, 2025–present)
Former
- Bart Smits – lead vocals (1989–1993, guest 2013 and 2014)
- Marike Groot – backing & co-lead vocals (1992–1993; guest 2014)
- Niels Duffhues – lead vocals, guitars (1993–1994)
- Martine van Loon – backing & co-lead vocals (1993–1994)
- Marjolein Kooijman – bass, backing vocals (2004–2014)
- Silje Wergeland – lead vocals, keyboards (2009–2025)

Timeline

== Discography ==
- Always... (1992)
- Almost a Dance (1993)
- Mandylion (1995)
- Nighttime Birds (1997)
- How to Measure a Planet? (1998)
- if_then_else (2000)
- Souvenirs (2003)
- Home (2006)
- The West Pole (2009)
- Disclosure (2012)
- Afterwords (2013) - also categorized as a remix album and EP
- Beautiful Distortion (2022)
