= Anneke van Giersbergen discography =

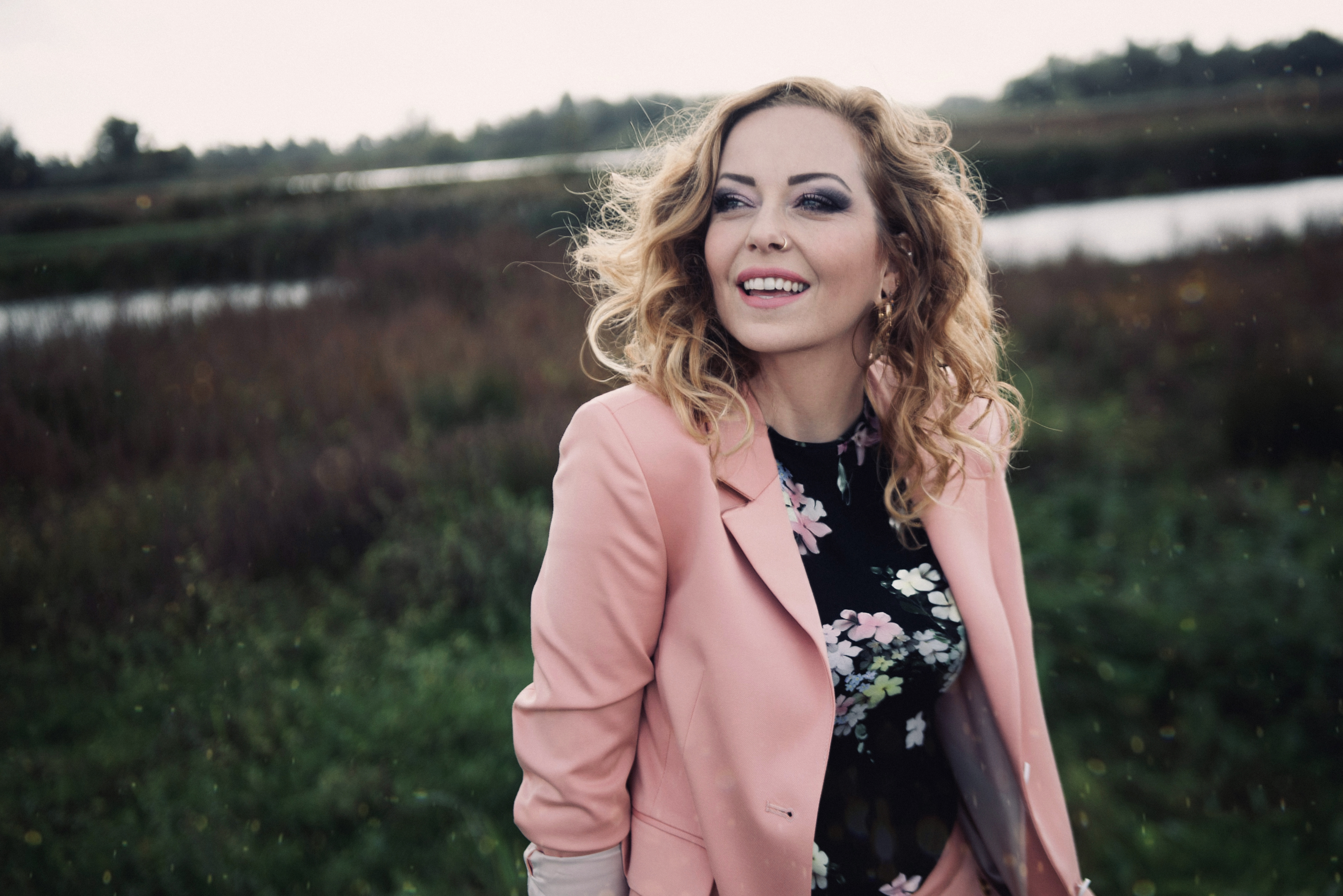
Anneke van Giersbergen promo photo 2023

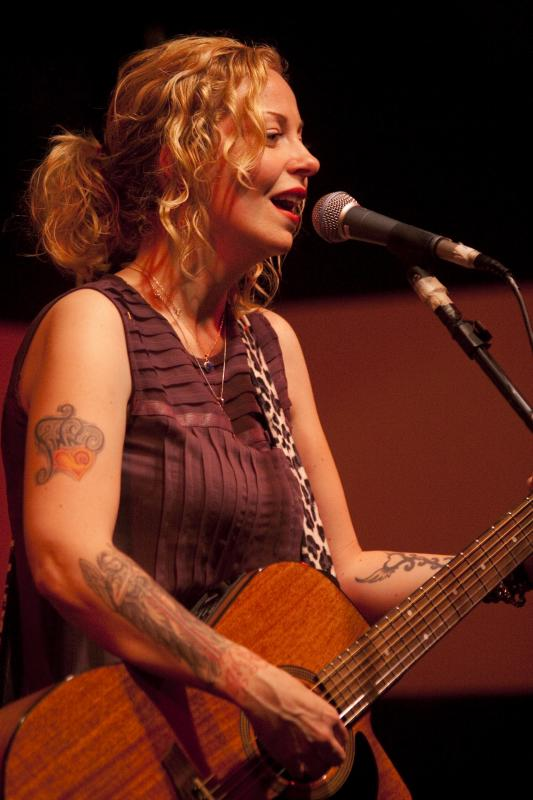
Van Giersbergen performing in 2010

This is the discography for Dutch rock/metal singer Anneke van Giersbergen.

== Albums ==
=== Studio albums ===
==== As Agua de Annique ====
Title	Album details	Peak chart positions
Title	Album details	NLD
Air	Released: 30 October 2007; Label: The End Records; Formats: CD, digital download	89
Pure Air	Released: 30 January 2009; Label: Agua Recordings; Formats: CD, digital download	42
In Your Room	Released: 30 October 2009; Label: Agua Recordings; Formats: CD, digital download	31

==== As Anneke van Giersbergen ====
Title	Album details	Peak chart positions
Title	Album details	NLD
Everything is Changing	Released: 20 January 2012; Label: Agua Recordings; Formats: CD, digital download	11
Drive	Released: 23 September 2013; Label: Inside Out Music; Formats: CD, digital download	52
The Darkest Skies Are the Brightest	Released: 26 February 2021; Label: Inside Out Music; Formats: CD, Digital Download, Vinyl	5

=== Collaborative albums ===
Title	Album details
In Parallel with Danny Cavanagh	Recorded live in March 2009 at the Little Devil in Tilburg, the Netherlands; Released: 10 September 2009; Label: Angelic Recordings; Formats: CD
De Beer Die Geen Beer Was with Martijn Bosman	Released: 17 December 2011; Label: Productiehuis Oost-Nederland; Formats: CD, digital download
Verloren Verleden with Árstíðir	Released: 12 February 2016; Label: Self-released; Formats: CD, digital download

=== Live albums ===
Title	Album details	Peak chart positions
Title	Album details	NLD
Live in Europe	Released: 15 October 2010; Label: Agua Recordings; Formats: CD	—
Symphonized	Released: 16 November 2018; Label: Inside Out Music; Format: CD	17
Let the Light In	Released: 21 July 2020; Label: Formats: CD	—

=== Singles ===
Title	Year	Album
"Day After Yesterday"	2007	Air
"Come Wander with Me"	2008	Pure Air
"The Blower's Daughter" with Danny Cavanagh	2009	In Parallel
"Hey Okay!"	2009	In Your Room
"Hey Okay!" (Acoustic Version)	2009	In Your Room
"Sunny Side Up"	2010	In Your Room
"Feel Alive"	2011	Everything Is Changing
"Circles"	2011	Everything Is Changing

== Music videos ==
Title	Year	Directed	Album
"Wonder"	2009	Erwin Arkema	In Your Room
"Feel Alive"	2011	Barry Annes	Everything Is Changing
"Take Me Home"	2012	Rob Hodselmans	Everything Is Changing
"My Mother Said"	2013	Raymond van Olphen	Drive
"My Promise"	2020	Jasper van Gheluwe	The Darkest Skies Are the Brightest

== Other appearances ==
Year	Artist	Album	Notes
1995	The Gathering	Mandylion	band member
1996	Farmer Boys	Countrified	vocals on "Never Let Me Down Again"
1997	The Gathering	Nighttime Birds	band member
1998	Ayreon	Into the Electric Castle	vocals on "Isis and Osiris", "The Decision Tree (We're alive)", "Tunnel of Light", "The Garden of Emotions", "Valley of the Queens" and "Another Time, Another Space"
1999	The Gathering	How to Measure a Planet?	band member
2000	The Gathering	Superheat	band member
2000	The Gathering	if then else	band member
2002	The Gathering	Black Light District	band member
2003	The Gathering	Souvenirs	band member
2004	Lawn	Backspace	vocals on "Fix"
2004	The Gathering	Sleepy Buildings – A Semi Acoustic Evening	band member
2006	Wetton/Downes	ICON II: Rubicon	vocals on "To Catch a Thief" & "Tears of Joy"
2006	Globus	Epicon	vocals on "Mighty Rivers Run" & "Diem Ex Dei"
2006	The Gathering	Home	band member
2006	Napalm Death	Smear Campaign	vocals on "Weltschmerz" & "In Deference"
2007	The Gathering	A Noise Severe (2007, CD and DVD) – lead vocals, guitar	band member
2008	Moonspell	Night Eternal	vocals on "Scorpion Flower"
2008	Within Temptation	Black Symphony	vocals on "Somewhere" (Live)
2008	Ayreon	01011001	vocals on "Age of Shadows (We are Forever)", "Comatose", "Beneath the Waves", "The Fifth Extinction", "Waking Dreams" and "The Sixth Extinction"
2009	Giant Squid	The Ichthyologist	vocals on "Sevengill (Notorynchus Cepedianus)"
2009	Within Temptation	An Acoustic Night at the Theatre	vocals on "Somewhere" (Live)
2009	Devin Townsend	Addicted	lead and backing vocals
2010	Shane Shu	Push Me to the Ground (Single)	vocals on "Push Me to the Ground"
2010	Maiden uniteD	Mind the Acoustic Pieces	vocals on "To Tame a Land" (duet with Damian Wilson)
2010	Maiden uniteD	The Trooper (Single)	vocals on "Sun and Steel"
2011	November's Doom	Aphotic	vocals on "What Could Have Been"
2011	Anathema	Falling Deeper	vocals on "Everwake" & "...Alone"
2011	Globus	Break From This World	vocals on "The Promise"
2011	Lorrainville	you may never know what happiness is	vocals on various tracks
2012	DJ Hidden & Anneke van Giersbergen	Lights Off: Only You Can See	vocals on "Only You Can See"
2012	Devin Townsend	Epicloud	lead and backing vocals
2012	Devin Townsend	By a Thread – Live in London 2011	lead and backing vocals on Addicted
2013	Devin Townsend	The Retinal Circus	lead and backing vocals
2014	Cellarscape	The Act of Letting Go	vocals on "The Same Place"
2014	Devin Townsend	Z² - Sky Blue	lead and backing vocals
2014	Devin Townsend	Z² - Dark Matters	lead and backing vocals on "From sleep awake"
2014	Countermove	The Power of Love Charity single for The Red Cross, originally by Frankie Goes to Hollywood	vocals
2015	The Gentle Storm	The Gentle Storm Exclusive Tour CD	band member
2015	The Gentle Storm	The Diary	band member
2015	Amadeus Awad	Death Is Just A Feeling	vocals
2016	The Gathering	TG25: Live at Doornroosje – live album	former band member, lead and backing vocals
2016	Ayreon	The Theater Equation	live album; vocals on ""Day Two: Isolation", ""Day Five: Voices", "Day Eight: School", "Day Eleven: Love", "Day Twelve: Trauma", "Day Fifteen: Betrayal", "Day Eighteen: Realization" and "Day Twenty: Confrontation" (replacing Mikael Åkerfeldt as Fear from the album The Human Equation)
2016	Devin Townsend	Transcendence	Vocals
2017	Vuur	In This Moment We Are Free – Cities	band member
2018	Ayreon	Ayreon Universe – The Best of Ayreon Live	vocals
2018	Amorphis	Queen of Time	Vocals on "Amongst Stars"
2018	Lux Terminus	The Courage to Be	Vocals on "Epilogue: Fly (IV)"
2019	Avalon	Return to Eden	vocals on "Hear My Call" and "We Are the Ones"
2019	Devin Townsend	Empath	lead and backing vocals on "Hear Me", "Here Comes the Sun" and "King"
2019	Scarlean	Soulmates	vocals on "Wonderful Life"
2019	Vomitron	Vomitron 2	vocals on "Cry Little Sister"
2020	Ayreon	Electric Castle Live and Other Tales	vocals
2020	Celestial Burst	The Maze	vocals
2020	Votum	Duhkha	backing vocals on "Prey"
2021	Silver Lake by Esa Holopainen	Silver Lake by Esa Holopainen	vocals on "Fading Moon"
2022	Devin Townsend	Lightwork	lead and backing vocals
2022	Docker's Guild	The Mystic Technocracy - Season 2: The Age of Entropy	vocals on "Cassilda's Song", "Urbs Aeterna" and "The Head" from the suite "Into the Dahr Cages"
2026	Devin Townsend	The Moth	Vocals

Recordings of van Giersbergen's voice can also be heard in Raveleijn, a horse show at Dutch theme park De Efteling. The same theme was re-used in 2012 for Aquanura, a water show in the same theme park. In 2015 a new roller coaster was openened at De Efteling, Baron 1898, where recordings of van Giersbergen's vocals are used for the White Women (Witte Wieven) characters. Her part is prominently featured twice during the ride, but is not part of the soundtrack CD.
