= In Your Room =

In Your Room may refer to:

- "In Your Room" (Depeche Mode song) (1993)
- "In Your Room" (The Bangles song) (1988)
- "In Your Room" (Toni Pearen song) (1992)
- In Your Room (Yazoo album) (2008)
- In Your Room (Agua de Annique album) (2009)
- "Aap Ke Kamre Mein" (lit. 'In Your Room'), a song by R. D. Burman, Asha Bhosle and Kishore Kumar from the 1971 Indian film Yaadon Ki Baaraat
