= How to Measure a Planet? =

Studio album by the Gathering
- Released: 9 November 1998
- Recorded: July–October 1998
- Studio: Bauwhaus Studios, Amsterdam, and Wisseloord Studios, Hilversum
- Genre: Progressive rock; alternative rock
- Length: 103:21
- Label: Century Media
- Producer: Attie Bauw

The Gathering chronology
Nighttime Birds (1997)	How to Measure a Planet? (1998)	Superheat (2000)

Professional ratings
Review scores
Source	Rating
AllMusic	4.5/5 stars
Chronicles of Chaos	7/10
Collector's Guide to Heavy Metal	7/10
Rock Hard	10/10

How to Measure a Planet? is the fifth studio album by the Dutch rock band the Gathering. It was released as a double CD on 9 November 1998 by Century Media Records. The album was recorded at Bauwhaus Studios, Amsterdam, and Wisseloord Studios, Hilversum, between July and October 1998 under the guidance of producer Attie Bauw.

The theme of space travel runs through many of the songs on the album as well as on the cover and CD booklet.

The track "Liberty Bell" was released as a single in Europe, as well as in Canada on a bonus CD distributed with issue 12 of the metal magazine Brave Words & Bloody Knuckles.

Upon release, the album received positive reviews from critics who appreciated the band's absorption of newfound elements of shoegaze and trip hop into its sound. However, many fans of the more metallic side of the group were not so pleased and it sold about two-thirds as much as its two predecessors (although some slippage should have been expected, given it was a more expensive two-CD package). Many of the Gathering's fans did stay with the band and, as the members have said, it brought them a whole new fanbase.

How to Measure a Planet? remains something of a high point for the Gathering, with tracks from the album making up the majority of their two subsequent live albums, Superheat (2000) and Sleepy Buildings – A Semi Acoustic Evening (2004).

In Japan, a one-CD version of the album was released, omitting the nearly half-hour title track.

== Background ==
Having already achieved some moderate success with Mandylion (1995) and Nighttime Birds (1997), the group felt trapped in an artistically controlled corner, which was very limited due to the high expectations from their fanbase.

Following the departure of guitarist Jelmer Wiersma, the remaining members of the Gathering decided they needed a change in musical direction. Having only one guitar player implied more space for different elements. Acknowledging the likes of Radiohead's OK Computer and Massive Attack's Mezzanine, and the growing influence of shoegaze bands such as Slowdive, the spacey psychedelia of bands such as Motorpsycho, and the more ethereal sounds of 4AD bands such as Dead Can Dance, the group took the opportunity to experiment with their sound and reinvent themselves.

Under guidance from producer Attie Bauw, the band embraced innovative recording techniques and a will to experiment, turning away from the standard structuring of their previous recordings. The group developed a different sound, less bombastic, more transparent, which vastly expanded the group's creative spectrum and style.

== Track listing ==
All lyrics are written by Anneke van Giersbergen.

Disc one
No.	Title	Music	Length
1.	"Frail (You Might as Well Be Me)"	René Rutten, Frank Boeijen	5:04
2.	"Great Ocean Road"	Rutten, Hugo Prinsen Geerligs	6:19
3.	"Rescue Me"	Rutten	6:22
4.	"My Electricity"	Van Giersbergen	3:32
5.	"Liberty Bell"	Rutten	6:01
6.	"Red Is a Slow Colour"	Rutten	6:26
7.	"The Big Sleep"	Boeijen	5:01
8.	"Marooned"	Rutten	5:56
9.	"Travel"	Rutten, Boeijen	9:06
Total length:			53:47

Disc two
No.	Title	Music	Length
1.	"South American Ghost Ride"	Boeijen	4:25
2.	"Illuminating"	Boeijen	5:51
3.	"Locked Away"	Van Giersbergen	3:24
4.	"Probably Built in the Fifties"	Rutten	7:26
5.	"How to Measure a Planet?"	Rutten, Prinsen Geerligs	28:33
Total length:			49:39

Japanese single-disc edition
No.	Title	Length
1.	"Frail (You Might as Well Be Me)"	5:04
2.	"Great Ocean Road"	6:19
3.	"Rescue Me"	6:22
4.	"My Electricity"	3:32
5.	"Liberty Bell"	6:01
6.	"Red Is a Slow Colour"	6:26
7.	"The Big Sleep"	5:01
8.	"Marooned"	5:56
9.	"Travel"	9:06
10.	"South American Ghost Ride"	4:25
11.	"Illuminating"	5:51
12.	"Locked Away"	3:24
13.	"Probably Built in the Fifties"	7:26
Total length:		74:48

== Personnel ==
The Gathering

- Anneke van Giersbergen – lead vocals, guitars on tracks 1.4 and 2.3
- René Rutten – guitars, didgeridoo on track 2.1, theremin on track 2.2
- Frank Boeijen – keyboards
- Hugo Prinsen Geerligs – bass
- Hans Rutten – drums

Production

- Attie Bauw – producer, engineer, mixing, programming, some percussion, arrangements with The Gathering
- Chris Blair – mastering at Abbey Road Studios, London

== Charts ==
Chart (1998)	Peak position
Dutch Albums Chart	45
German Albums Chart	99
