= Superheat =

Superheat may refer to:

- Superheating, in physics
- Superheater, for steam engine superheat
- Superheat (album), live 2000 album by Dutch band The Gathering
