= BMG Production Music =

American production music company

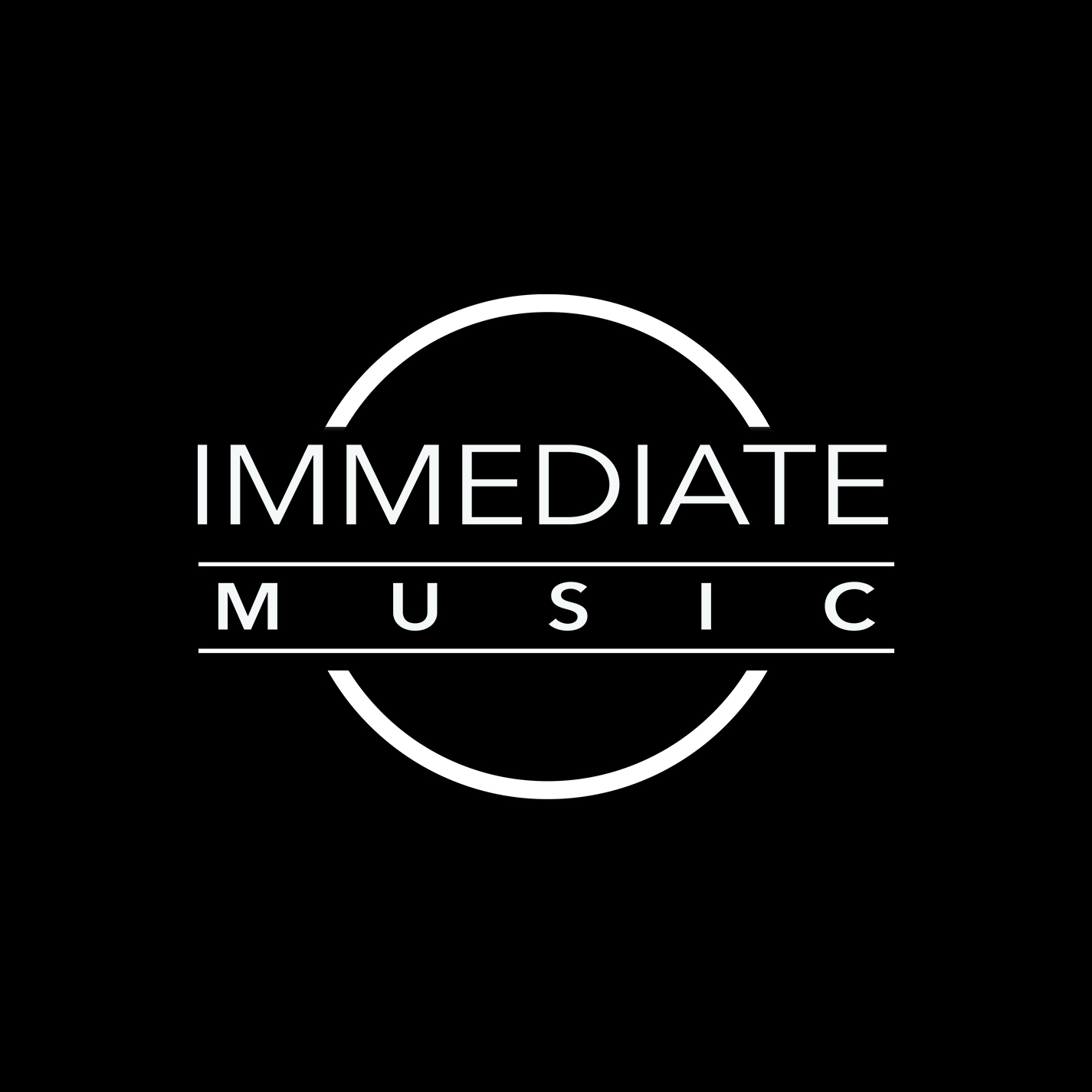
- Formerly: Immediate Music, LLC (1993–2017)
- Type: Subsidiary
- Industry: Music industry
- Founded: 1993; 33 years ago
- Founders: Yoav Goren; Jeffrey Fayman
- Headquarters: Santa Monica, California, U.S.
- Key people: Yoav Goren; Jeffrey Fayman
- Parent: BMG Rights Management (2017–present)
- Subsidiaries: 1 Revolution Music
- Website: immediatemusic.com

Immediate Music

BMG Production Music is an American production music company based in Santa Monica, California owned by BMG Rights Management, a subsidiary of German conglomerate Bertelsmann. Founded in 1993 as Immediate Music, it is best known for specializing in high-end trailer music for commercial motion pictures. The company's music has been featured in film trailers such as those for Avatar, Alien vs. Predator, Terminator Salvation, Pirates of the Caribbean: At World's End, The Ring, The Matrix franchise, Marvel Cinematic Universe, The Lord of the Rings, The Hobbit franchises and the Harry Potter films.

In 2007, Immediate received an Emmy for "Outstanding Music Composition in a Sports Program" for their work on the 2006 Winter Olympics. Immediate Music has its own band, Globus, that fuses cinematic orchestral music with contemporary and world music rhythms. In September 2017, Bertelsmann acquired Immediate Music and subsequently adopted its current name.

== Organization ==
Immediate Music was founded in 1993 by Jeffrey Fayman and Yoav Goren with their first trailer track for Carlito's Way. Originally starting out as making music for film trailers, in 2008 the company opened its libraries to the video game and advertising industries.

The company is based in Santa Monica, California. In addition to Immediate Music, they also operate 1 Revolution Music, a company founded in 2010 that specializes television soundtracks and trailers. Its record label, Imperativa Records that releases albums in the Epic Music genre to the public since 2006.

== Discography ==
Immediate Music has released a number of albums that incorporate a wide range of genres, none of which however are commercially available to the general public. The most well known of these is the Themes for Orchestra and Choir series which currently has three multi-disk volumes. For the month of December 2010, Immediate Music made their TFOAC volumes 2 and 3 CDs available for purchase by the public.

=== Studio albums ===
==== Industry release ====
- 30 Clicks North
- Action / Drama #1
- Action / Drama #2
- Action / Drama #3
- Action / Drama #4
- Action / Drama #5
- Act 1
- Amethyst Skies
- Ashes
- Black Room
- Broken Dreams
- Burning Drums
- Carnage
- Champion
- Cinematic Soundscapes
- Cinematic Tension And Horror #1
- Comedy #1
- Comedy #2
- Comedy #3
- Dark Hero: Uprising
- Decompression
- Dream Worlds
- Drums & Chants: Ritual
- Encounters
- Epic #1
- Epic #2
- Epic #3
- Epic Choral Action #1
- Epic: The Dark And The Light
- Existence
- Exosphere
- Exosphere II
- Fantasy And Imagination
- Fate Of Gods
- Fields Of Glory
- Final Escape
- Frenzy
- Grindhouse Serenade
- Horror / Sci-Fi #1
- Inferno
- Life Cycles
- Lumina
- Memories
- Night Terrors
- Omega
- Omega II
- Omega III
- On The Burden Of Being
- Orchestral Soundtrack
- Patriotic Covers
- Percussive Action #1
- Plosive: In Three Acts
- Quantum
- Redemption
- Revolt
- Romantic & Adventure #2
- Romantic Comedy, Romantic & Adventure #1
- Romantic Comedy #2
- Subliminal
- Subsonic
- Subversion
- Suspense & Drama #1
- Suspense & Drama #2
- Suspense & Drama #3
- Suspense & Drama #4
- Suspense & Drama #5
- Themes For Orchestra And Choir 1
- Themes For Orchestra And Choir 2
- Themes For Orchestra And Choir 3
- Themes For Orchestra And Choir 4
- Themes For Orchestra And Choir 5
- The Dark Web
- Trailer Beast: Heroes, Legends And Ogres
- Trailer DNA: Toolkit
- Trailer Rock Series: Hard Rock
- Trailer Rock Series: Pop Rock
- Trailer Rock Series: Post Rock
- Transformers And Terminators
- Trinity And Beyond
- Unique Organic Underscore
- Universe Number 7
- Youth Oriented #1
- Youth Oriented #2
- Youth Oriented #3
- Youth Oriented #4
- Youth Oriented #5
- Violations
- Wonder

==== Trailerhead (2008) (15 songs - 45 minutes 57 seconds) ====
1. Prometheus Rising (Ported from Themes for Orchestra and Choir 3) - Based On "Peace In Our Time"
2. An Epic Age – Based on "Epicon"
3. Lacrimosa Dominae – Based on "Lacrimosa" and "Preliator"
4. Serenata Immortale – Based on "Serenata" and "Orchard of Mines"
5. Imperitum – Based on "Imperativa"
6. Trial of the Archangel – Based on "Witch Hunt" and "Archangel"
7. Prelude to Paradise – Based on "Prelude" and "Prelude (On Earth As In Heaven)"
8. The Reluctant Warrior (Ported from Themes for Orchestra and Choir 3)
9. Spiritus Omnia – Based on "Spiritus Elektros", "Spiritus Sancte" and "Spiritus Khayyam"
10. Fides en Lucius Dei – Based on "Lucius Dei" and "Diem ex Dei"
11. Shield of Faith – Based on "Armed By Faith" and "Take Me Away"
12. Onward to Freedom - Based on "Onward To Glory"
13. Empyrean Mercenaries – Based on "Heaven's Warriors"
14. Generations (Ported from Themes for Orchestra and Choir 3)
15. Age of Discovery (Ported from Themes for Orchestra and Choir 3) – Based on "Elegy"

==== Trailerhead: Saga (2010) ====
Trailerhead: Saga is Immediate's second studio album, released digitally on July 20, 2010.

1. Hymnus Orbis – Based on "Hymn"
2. Glory Seeker – Based on "Defcon"
3. Libertas – Based on "Liberation"
4. Invictus – Based on "Divide and Conquer" and "Black Parade"
5. Oratio Sanctus – Based on "Holy" and "Madre Terra"
6. Emergence Of Empire – Based on "Rising Empire"
7. In League With Cerberus – Based on "Final Omen 2", "Monolith", and "Blasphemy 2.0"
8. Darkness On The Edge Of Power – Based on "Dark side of Power"
9. Ashes Of War – Based on "Love And War"
10. World On A String – Based on "Global Crisis #1"
11. Salvation For A Proud Nation – Based on "Proud Nation" and "Salvation"
12. Fatum Plebis – Based on "O Destina"
13. Darkness On The Edge Of Power (Live)
14. Surrender To Hope – Based on "Believe"

==== Trailerhead: Triumph (2012) ====
Trailerhead: Triumph is Immediate's third studio album, released digitally on October 30, 2012.

1. Destiny of the Chosen - Based on "Epic Expedition" and "Rise of the Chosen"
2. Journey to Glory - Based on "In Memoriam" and "Journey To The Front"
3. Tales of the Electric Romeo - Based on "Electric Romeo" and "Europa"
4. Battle For The Soul of the Universe - Based on "Mother of All Battles"
5. Ode To Power - Based on "With Great Power"
6. State Of Endless Grace - Based On "State of Grace"
7. Falling Skies - Based on "Catch the Falling Sky"
8. Rex Imperium - Based on "Rex Eternum"
9. Tears of Blood - Based on "With an iron fist"
10. A Nation Born - Based on "Birth of a Nation"
11. Burden Of Atlas - Based on "Atlas" and "The Promise"
12. How To Control The Dream - Based on "A life extraordinary" and "Control the dream"
13. Incensus - Based on "Fahrenheit"
14. Mercurial - Based on "A Grand Inqusition", "Mercuito", and "A Thousand Deaths"
15. Excalibur - Based on "Return of the King"
16. Ageless Empires - Based on "Age of empires"
17. Sanctus Immortale - Based on "Iron Warrior" and "Doomsday"
18. Pandora‘s Heaven - Based on "Pandora"
19. Rex Imperium Reprise - (Rex Eternum)
20. The Lords Shall Rule - Based on "Lords of the Realm"
21. Novus Arcana - Based on "Arcana" and "False Reedemers"
22. Barbarians - Moniker remix (bonus track)
23. Salveus - Moniker remix (bonus track)

==== Epic Olympic Dreams (2012) ====
Epic Olympic Dreams is Immediate's fourth studio album, released digitally on July 9, 2012. As of January 2017, is no longer available.

1. Heroes Crusade
2. For Honor, for Glory, Forever
3. Glorious Victories
4. On the Eve of the Games
5. Let the Games Begin
6. Pride on the Platform
7. Union of Warriors
8. World on a String
9. The Brave and the Proud
10. Spirit of the Ancients
11. Salvation of a Proud Nation
12. Triumphant Ceremony
13. Victory for the Hometown Hero
14. Surrender to Hope
15. Legacy of Champions
16. Voyage to the Games
17. Onward to Freedom
18. Quest for Gold
19. Echoes of Greatness
20. Dreams of my Country

==== The Demon Within (2013) ====
The Demon Within is Immediate's fifth studio album, released digitally on October 21, 2013. As of January 2017, it is no longer available.

1. Tormentor
2. Witch Hunt
3. Shadow Killer
4. Infernalis
5. Fatal Vision
6. Possessed
7. Sensing Human Prey
8. The Demon Code
9. Dead Ringer
10. Curse Of The Oracle
11. Fear
12. The Gathering
13. Unholy In Thee
14. Countdown To Oblivion
15. Find Your Way Out
16. Prophets Of Doom
17. Incubus
18. Slash And Burn
19. Why Is This Happening
20. The World We Have Left
21. Death Box
22. In League With Cerberus

==== Trailerhead: Nu Epiq (2014) ====
Trailerhead: Nu Epiq is Immediate's sixth studio album, released digitally on May 27, 2014.

1. Protectors Of Truth – Based on "Vindicator"
2. From The Ashes We Will Rise – Based on "The Brave Shall Rise"
3. This War Must End – Based on "We Made This War"
4. Purple Heart - Based on "The Tomb"
5. Wolf Moon Uprising – Based on "Wolf Moon 2012"
6. A Life Extraordinary – Based on "How To Control The Dream" and "Eclipse"
7. Saga Of The Immortals – Based on "Immortal Legends"
8. Majestic – Based on "Kingmaker"
9. The Unlikeliest Of Heroes - Based on "Unlikely Hero"
10. Translucent
11. Prologue To A Conquest – Based on "Counquest of Kingdoms"
12. Night Of The Avenging Angels - Based on "Avenging Angel"
13. Deliverance For All – Based on "End of a Dark Ages"
14. One Destiny To Follow
15. Dark Times Are Upon Us - Based on "These Are Dark Times"
16. The Fate Of Our Brave – Based on "Fate Of The World"
17. Falling Into Inertia - Based on "For The Fallen"
18. This World Of Wonders – Based on "Voyage of Wonder"
19. Virtue At All Costs

==== Futbol Is Epic! (2016) ====
Futbol Is Epic! is Immediate Music's seventh studio album released in 2016.

1. Milan, Milan!
2. Alles Paris Saint-Germain
3. You'll Never Walk Alone (feat. Matty McCloskey & Julien Jorgensen)
4. Cant del Barca
5. Stern des Sudens
6. Glory, Glory, Man United
7. Storia di un grande amore
8. Tek Buyuk Galatasaray
9. Hymne Olympique Lyonnais
10. Arsenal, We're On You're Side
11. Leuchte auf mein Stern Borussia
12. Blue Is the Colour
13. Vechernyaya Pesnya (Zenit)
14. Gluck auf, def Steiger kommt
15. !Hala Madrid! (Himno del Centenario)

==== Trailerhead: Catharsis (2021) ====
Catharsis is Immediate's seventh studio album, released digitally on July 30, 2021.

1. The Rock Upon Which All Waves Crash
2. Lockdown
3. Short Goodbyes and Long Memories
4. Super Spreader
5. Origins of Chaos
6. For Those Who Don't Get to Say Goodbye
7. Collective Rebirth
8. Uprising Catalyst
9. Darkest Before Dawn
10. Herd Immunity
11. What Was Lost Will Not Be Forgotten
12. Covid Elegy

== See also ==
- Globus (music)
