= The Diary (The Gentle Storm album) =

Studio album by The Gentle Storm
- Released: 23 March 2015
- Recorded: April 2014–2015
- Genre: Folk rock, progressive rock, progressive metal, symphonic metal
- Length: 113:56
- Label: Inside Out Music
- Producer: Arjen Anthony Lucassen

The Gentle Storm chronology
The Gentle Storm Exclusive Tour CD (2015)	The Diary (2015)

Arjen Anthony Lucassen chronology
The Theory of Everything (2013)	The Diary (2015)	The Source (2017)

Anneke van Giersbergen chronology
Drive (2013)	The Diary (2015)

The Diary is the debut studio album by the Dutch band The Gentle Storm, consisting of composer and guitarist Arjen Anthony Lucassen and singer and lyricist Anneke van Giersbergen. It was released on March 23, 2015 in Europe, and the following day in the US.

A concept album about a love story set in the 17th century, The Diary consists of two discs, each with the same track list: the "Gentle" side of the album consists of acoustic, softer, folk-oriented versions of the songs, while the "Storm" side of the album is made of heavy metal versions of the songs with progressive and symphonic elements.

== Story ==
The story is taken from the album's liner notes.

The album describes the lives of Joseph Warwijck (born in Amsterdam in 1644) and Susanne Vermeer (born in Delft in 1647). They were married in 1666, and lived in Lindengracht, Amsterdam. The story is set in the late 1600s during the Dutch Golden Age of the 17th Century, when the Dutch sailed to many far regions of the world; trading gold, silver, and goods with many other territories. Joseph was a young officer serving with the VOC (Verenigde Oost-In-dische Compagnie), or also called the Dutch East India Company.

On December 20, 1666 Joseph leaves for the island of Texel to await the departure of the VOC ship, Merchant. He departs on his two-and-a-half-year journey on December 26, 1666. Susanne begins writing letters to him, in order to make Joseph's long journey more bearable. Not long after; on February 1, 1667, Susanne discovers she is pregnant and instantly writes Joseph to tell him of the news. Susanne gives birth to their son Michiel on September 20, 1667, and then writes Joseph again a few days later to tell him of their son's birth. After sending her letters to Joseph, informing him of their son's birth, Susanne receives a letter from Joseph that he had written five months earlier, letting her know that he is safe and that he is soon departing for Batavia, and then India, soon after. Susanne's first letters arrive to Joseph in mid-February 1668, in Batavia, just before he sails to India. He is overjoyed with the news of learning he will be a father. However, the first ship leaving Batavia, going back to Holland to deliver mail, does not depart until December 1668, so he is unable to send a response to Susanne.

From February until August 1668, Joseph makes his journey to India. It was a most dangerous trip since they had many encounters with British ships, who were Holland's biggest rivals and competitors at the time, and were in a state of war. By this time the war was over, but news of the end of the war had not reached the territories of India just yet. He describes these events in a letter to Susanne, which she is excited to receive, knowing that Joseph is safe.

Back in Amsterdam, several months earlier in March 1668, Susanne learns she has an illness. Their son, Michiel is now six months old. It was in April 1668, Susanne sends another letter to Joseph, hinting at her illness, and hoping for him to return home. After returning from India, Joseph finally receives Susanne's earlier letters in September 1668, which had arrived in Batavia during June and July, a couple of months earlier. As of November 1668, Susanne still has not received any further letters from Joseph and is increasingly worried about him, and decides to write him another letter describing her illness and hopes he is on his way home. Still unaware of Susanne's condition, Joseph departs from Batavia on December 14, 1668, to return home to Amsterdam. As he reaches the Cape of Good Hope in Africa, in March 1669, he receives more of Susanne's earlier letters. He is still unaware of her illness and continues his journey home.

On May 7, 1669, Susanne dies in Amsterdam and is buried by her family a couple of days later. Two months later; on July 1, 1669, Joseph finally arrives back at his house in Lindengracht, only to learn of Susanne's death, and is able to meet his son Michiel for the first time, who is now almost 2 years old. Joseph finds Susanne's diary containing many entries while he was on his journey, describing many of her thoughts and feelings as well as many other things she wanted to share with him while he was away. He finds more letters she had written between the diary's pages and then realizes her words and their son, Michiel, is all he has left of Susanne. Joseph then places her letters within the pages of the diary and keeps them safe so they may be passed on to Michiel. The very next day, after returning home, Joseph visits Susanne's grave with Michiel. 11 years later, in 1680, Joseph becomes Captain of the VOC ship Merel (The Blackbird). He then departs the island of Texel for another voyage with Michiel, now roughly 13 years old, accompanying him.

Present Day - Joseph and Susanne's diaries and letters were handed down as family heirlooms from generation to generation. Although, at some point during the early 1800s their importance went unnoticed. They were eventually stored in a wooden chest and placed in the attic of the family estate. There they remained until they were discovered again in the early 21st century.

== Track listing ==
All lyrics are written by Anneke van Giersbergen; all music is composed by Arjen Anthony Lucassen.

CD1: Gentle
No.	Title	Length
1.	"Endless Sea"	5:59
2.	"Heart of Amsterdam"	6:36
3.	"The Greatest Love"	4:08
4.	"Shores of India"	6:40
5.	"Cape of Storms"	5:28
6.	"The Moment"	6:08
7.	"The Storm"	5:56
8.	"Eyes of Michiel"	3:56
9.	"Brightest Light"	4:46
10.	"New Horizons"	5:24
11.	"Epilogue: The Final Entry"	2:02
Total length:		57:03

CD 2: Storm
No.	Title	Length
1.	"Endless Sea"	5:53
2.	"Heart of Amsterdam"	6:37
3.	"The Greatest Love"	3:57
4.	"Shores of India"	6:24
5.	"Cape of Storms"	5:32
6.	"The Moment"	6:10
7.	"The Storm"	5:58
8.	"Eyes of Michiel"	4:00
9.	"Brightest Light"	4:54
10.	"New Horizons"	5:25
11.	"Epilogue: The Final Entry"	2:03
Total length:		56:53

== Charts ==
Chart	Peak position
Belgian Albums (Ultratop Flanders)	79
Belgian Albums (Ultratop Wallonia)	130
Dutch Albums (Album Top 100)	6
French Albums (SNEP)	157
German Albums (Offizielle Top 100)	38
Swiss Albums (Schweizer Hitparade)	62

== Personnel ==
The Gentle Storm

- Anneke van Giersbergen - lead and backing vocals
- Arjen Anthony Lucassen - electric and acoustic guitars, electric and acoustic bass guitars, keyboards, hammered dulcimer

Additional musicians

- Johan van Stratum - bass
- Ed Warby - drums
- Rob Snijders - percussion
- Joost van den Broek - piano
- Ben Mathot - violin
- Maaike Peterse - cello
- Hinse Mutter - double bass
- Jenneke de Jonge - French horn
- Jeroen Goossens - wind instruments
- Michael Mills - Irish bouzouki
- Timo Somers - guitar solo
- Epic Rock Choir - choir
