= Globus (band) =

American rock band

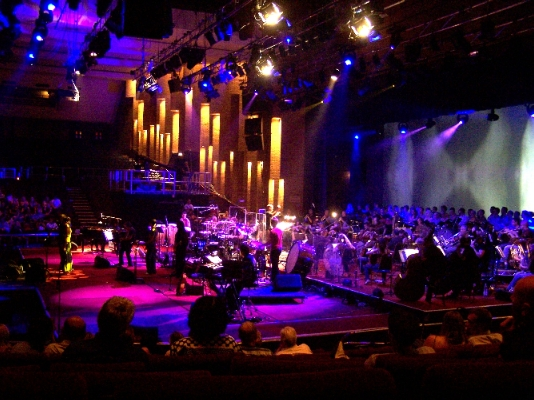
- The world premiere of Globus at The Grand Hall, Wembley, London. It was the last concert held at this location.

Background information
- Origin: Santa Monica, California, United States
- Genres: Orchestral; world; symphonic rock; symphonic metal
- Years active: 2006–present
- Label: Imperativa Records
- Members: Ryan Hanifl; Lisbeth Scott; Scott Ciscon; Anneke van Giersbergen; Christine Navarro; Yoav Goren; Dann Pursey; Tate Simms; Mark Richardson; Jeffrey Fayman; Robert Fripp; Sammy Allen; Kfir Melamed; Hiro Goto; Mike Horick; Bernard Yin; Jane Runnalls; Ariel Mann; Gregg Bissonette; Lindsay Solo; Adam Max Goren; Stacy Wilde; TD Lind; Mark Richmond Phillips
- Website: www.globusmusic.com

Globus is an American movie trailer music-inspired band consisting of a mix of producers, musicians, and vocalists. The band is led by composer and producer Yoav Goren.

== History ==
=== Foundation ===
Globus was founded as a result of increasing demand for Immediate Music to make their work available to a wider audience. The band's live world premiere took place in The Grand Hall, Wembley, London, on July 26, 2006 and their first album, Epicon, was released in August of that same year. Feeder's Mark Richardson is featured on drums with guest performances by vocalist Scott Ciscon.

=== Later years ===
In 2011, Globus released their second album, Break From This World, with Ciscon returning for some performances together with Dutch singer Anneke van Giersbergen. The latter also actively participated in the album's development, helping write some of the lyrics for the song Mighty Rivers Run.

In the following years, Globus' activity declined, as creative director Yoav Goren worked on other composing and producing projects.

=== Return ===
The group announced that they had restarted work in mid-2018. On 4 November 2020, a rendition of John Lennon's "Gimme Some Truth" (1971) was released, the band's first studio recording in over 9 years, and the first of a so-called Election 2020 trilogy of covers.

On 25 February 2022, the band released You and I performed by Dann Pursey as the first of three singles for a third studio album Cinematica, which was released on October 14, 2022.

This was followed by a collaboration with A.D.A.M., in which Globus producer Yoav Goren worked with songwriter Danny McGaw and vocalist TD Lind on an outlaw-themed album, Unforgiven, released March 15, 2024. In addition, a 22-minute Unforgiven short film was produced, containing music videos for "The Devil Is Me," "Ordinary Man," and "Love Me True" within an overarching narrative, premiering March 15, 2025 at the Indie Short Fest. After securing awards including Best Short Film (Rome International Short Festival) and Best Music in Short (Hong Kong Indie Film Festival), the Unforgiven film was released to YouTube April 16, 2026.

A fifth studio album, Every End a Whispered Start, was premiered on YouTube on August 25, 2026, in advance of the album's full release on September 25. The album's production was accompanied by "Inside the Sound," a behind-the-scenes documentary series of 10 episodes.

== Musical style ==
Globus is considered to have been a pioneer of the then relatively young Epic Music genre. As a result, their musical style range from orchestral arrangements to symphonic rock with elements of world music and symphonic metal. Many tracks are based on orchestral source tracks from the Immediate Music library, layering rock elements over reworked arrangements.

Some of their compositions have been used as trailer music, such as Preliator, which was featured in the trailers for Spider-Man 2 and The Dukes of Hazzard as well as the "Epic" promo for PlayStation Move. A portion of their Epicon "Preliator" track was used for the final sinking of the Japanese warship "Yamato" feature (2005).

== Discography ==
=== Studio albums ===
==== Epicon (2006) ====
No.	Title	Lead vocals	Length
1.	"Preliator (source track "Lacrimosa")"	Lisbeth Scott	4:28
2.	"Mighty Rivers Run (source track "Where Mighty Rivers Run")"	Anneke van Giersbergen	5:13
3.	"Prelude (On Earth as in Heaven) (source track "Prelude")"	Dann Pursey	5:25
4.	"Spiritus Khayyam (source tracks "Spiritus Sancte" and "Spiritus Elektros")"	Shadia	5:12
5.	"La Coronacion (source track "Coronation")"		4:18
6.	"Europa (source track "Electric Romeo")"	Dann Pursey	4:03
7.	"Diem Ex Dei (source track "Lucius Dei")"	Anneke van Giersbergen and Christine Navarro	6:04
8.	"Orchard of Mines (source track "Serenata")"	Dann Pursey	5:08
9.	"Crusaders of the Light (source track "Crusade")"		5:43
10.	"Madre Terra (source track "Holy")"	Scott Ciscon	4:12
11.	"Illumination (source track "Euphrates")"	Terry Wood	5:44
12.	"Take Me Away (source track "Armed by Faith")"	Dann Pursey	4:22
13.	"Sarabande Suite (Aeternae) (source tracks "Angel Terreste," "Redeemer," and "Strength and Honor")"	Dann Pursey	7:46
14.	"Porque te Vas (Globus Version) (José Luis Perales cover)"	Tel Badani	4:06
Total length:			71:44

==== Break from This World (2011) ====
No.	Title	Lead vocals	Length
1.	"The Promise (source track "Atlas")"	Lisbeth Scott and Anneke van Giersbergen	7:36
2.	"Wyatt Earth (source track "Wyatt's Torch")"	Dann Pursey	6:05
3.	"Doomsday (source track "Iron Warrior")"	Lisbeth Scott	3:37
4.	"A Thousand Deaths (source tracks "Grand Inquisition" and "Mercutio")"	Ryan Hanifl	6:30
5.	"Save Me"	Ryan Hanifl	5:55
6.	"In Memoriam (source track "Journey to the Front")"	Scott Ciscon	4:24
7.	"Manuela"	Ryan Hanifl	4:40
8.	"Amazing Grace"	Ryan Hanifl	4:53
9.	"Black Parade (source track "Divide and Conquer")"	Dann Pursey	5:19
10.	"One Truth"	Lisbeth Scott	6:29
11.	"Terminal"	Yoav Goren	7:22
12.	"Elegy (source track "Age of Discovery")"	Ryan Hanifl	7:25
Total length:			70:15

==== Cinematica (2022) ====
No.	Title	Lead vocals	Length
1.	"Sprockets"		0:27
2.	""Peace in Our Time" (source track "Prometheus Rising")"	Ryan Hanifl	6:17
3.	"O California (source track "Iron Giant")"	Dann Pursey	4:53
4.	"False Redeemers (source track "Arcana")"	Dann Pursey	3:28
5.	"War (source track "Victorious")"	Yoav Goren and Lindsay Solo	5:53
6.	"I'm Afraid of Americans (David Bowie cover)"	Adam Max Goren and Dann Pursey	3:48
7.	"Peltier: The Art of Healing"		2:19
8.	"Mighty Ship"	Lisbeth Scott	5:37
9.	"Recover"	Anneke Van Giersbergen	5:00
10.	"Seraphim"	Scott Ciscon	2:52
11.	"Brothers in Arms (source track "Armies of Steel")"	Ryan Hanifl	4:12
12.	"You'll Never Walk Alone (Oscar Hammerstein II cover)"	Lisbeth Scott	4:16
13.	"Air I Breathe"	Adam Max Goren	4:14
14.	"You and I (Album Version) (source track "Day Is at Hand")"	Dann Pursey	4:57
15.	"The River"	Jane Runnalls	4:06
16.	"Carry the Flame"	Stacy Wilde	3:48
17.	"Golden Dream (Letter from Adi Abeyito)"	Yoav Goren	8:07
Total length:			74:50

==== Unforgiven - Globus and A.D.A.M (2024) ====
No.	Title	Length
1.	"Ordinary Man"	3:53
2.	"On the Run"	4:19
3.	"Upside Down"	4:28
4.	"The Devil Is Me"	3:44
5.	"Stranger"	3:28
6.	"Put You Down"	4:06
7.	"Sick in the Head"	3:21
8.	"Bad Man"	3:34
9.	"We Had Everything"	3:29
10.	"Love Me True"	2:51
11.	"Redemption (down the line...)"	5:15
Total length:		42:33

==== Every End a Whispered Start (2026) ====
No.	Title	Lead vocals	Length
1.	"Shelter from the Storm"	Dann Pursey	3:52
2.	"Sacrifice (source track "The Hunger")"	Lisbeth Scott	5:12
3.	"The Siege (Welcome to My Bunker) (source track "How to Control the Dream")"	Yoav Goren and Mark Richmond Phillips	6:10
4.	"Liberation Day"	Yoav Goren	4:49
5.	"One More Day, One More Night (Tom Petty cover)"	Anneke van Giersbergen	5:29
6.	"When We Were Young"	Tate Simms	5:13
7.	"Everything in Its Place"	TD Lind	4:01
8.	"Dying Can Be Beautiful"	Ryan Hanifl	8:48
9.	"Perfect World"	Ryan Hanifl and Sammy Allen	4:36
10.	"Conspiracies (source track "Falling Skies")"	Ryan Hanifl	4:24
11.	"Extraordinary (source track "Fatum Plebis")"	Lisbeth Scott	5:13
12.	"Someone Called My Name"	Yoav Goren	4:48
13.	"Evergrand"	Sammy Allen	2:21
14.	"Identity (source track "St. Francis by Moonlight")"	Ryan Hanifl	5:53
Total length:			70:46

==== Live albums ====
- Epic Live! (2010)
- Studio Live (2012)

=== Singles ===
- Prelude (On Earth as in Heaven)
- Spiritus Khayyam
- Orchard of Mines
- Wyatt Earth
- Preliator
- Europa
- Save Me
- Gimme Some Truth (John Lennon Cover)
- I'm Afraid Of Americans (David Bowie Cover)
- Democracy (Leonard Cohen Cover)
- You and I
- Brothers In Arms
- Recover
- Black Parade (2022 Remaster)
- Ordinary Man
- On the Run
- Redemption (down the line...)
- Shelter from the Storm
- Liberation Day
- Perfect World
- Prelude - On Earth as in Heaven (2026 Cinematic Future Bass Remix)

=== DVDs ===
- Live at Wembley (2008)

== Band members ==
- Yoav Goren - keyboards, Lead vocals
- Daniel Pursey - guitar, Lead vocals
- Lisbeth Scott - Lead vocals
- Scott Ciscon - Lead vocals
- Anneke van Giersbergen - Lead vocals
- Ryan Hanifl - guitar, Lead vocals
- Jane Runnalls - Lead vocals
- Lindsay Solo - Lead vocals
- Adam Max Goren - Lead vocals
- Stacy Wilde - Lead vocals
- Christine Navarro - backing vocals
- Sammy Allen - backing vocals, Lead vocals
- Tate Simms - bass, Lead vocals
- TD Lind - Lead vocals
- Mark Richmond Phillips - Lead vocals
- Mark Richardson - lead drums
- Jeffrey Fayman - percussion, drums
- Robert Fripp - guitar
- Kfir Melamed - bass
- Hiro Goto - strings
- Mike Horick - drums
- Bernard Yin - guitars
- Ariel Mannn - guitars

== See also ==
- Nick Phoenix
- Thomas J. Bergersen
- Two Steps from Hell

For more orchestral bands related to Globus (music), see the Trailer music article.
