= Anneke van Giersbergen =

Dutch singer and musician

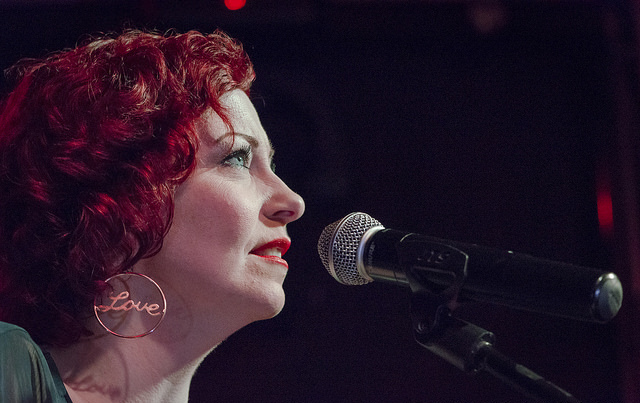
- Anneke performing at Manifesto Bar in São Paulo, Brazil, on 11 March 2014

Background information
- Born: Anna Maria van Giersbergen; 8 March 1973 (age 53); Sint-Michielsgestel, Netherlands
- Genres: Doom metal, electronic, rock, heavy metal, progressive rock, pop rock, progressive metal, acoustic, folk
- Occupations: Singer, songwriter, pianist, guitarist
- Instruments: Vocals, piano, guitar, acoustic guitar
- Labels: InsideOut Music, Agua Records
- Website: www.annekevangiersbergen.com

Anna Maria "Anneke" van Giersbergen (born 8 March 1973) is a Dutch singer, songwriter, guitarist and pianist. She became internationally known as the lead vocalist and principal songwriter of the progressive and atmospheric rock band The Gathering, of which she was a member from 1994 to 2007. During this period she recorded seminal albums such as Mandylion (1995) and Nighttime Birds (1997), which defined the band's sound and established her name on the international scene.

After leaving the group, she developed a successful solo career — initially under the project Agua de Annique and, from 2012 onwards, under her own name — and also formed the bands The Gentle Storm (2015) and VUUR (2017). She is recognised for her wide vocal range and stylistic versatility, having moved naturally between atmospheric rock, progressive metal, folk and acoustic pop over more than three decades.

A frequent collaborator of Arjen Anthony Lucassen and Devin Townsend, Anneke has also worked with artists such as Within Temptation, Anathema, Amorphis, Napalm Death, Moonspell, Novembers Doom, Globus, Lawn, Farmer Boys and Giant Squid, among many others. In 2019, she received the Buma ROCKS! Export Award, given annually by the Dutch copyright organisation Buma Cultuur to the Dutch artist with the greatest international presence in heavy music.

In 2025, The Gathering's classic Mandylion line-up reunited for a series of shows commemorating the album's 30th anniversary. The overwhelming response to the sold-out shows in the Netherlands led the band to an extensive world tour in 2026, with dates at festivals and venues across Europe, North America and South America.

== Biography ==
=== Early life ===
Anneke was born in the small town of Sint-Michielsgestel in the Netherlands. She began singing at age 7, when she took part in a music contest. By 12 she was singing in her school choir, which toured France. She later took singing lessons and joined her first band. After that first experience, Anneke went on to join several bands. In 1992, she co-founded the duo "Bad Breath" with guitarist and singer Deniz Cagdas (Spencer Edgards), a project rooted in blues, jazz, folk and funk.

=== The Gathering ===
In 1994 she was invited to join The Gathering through a mutual friend. Her musical sensibility fitted perfectly with the changes the band intended to make, and the result was very successful.

Anneke's debut with the band, Mandylion, The Gathering's third album, was released on 22 August 1995. From her first album with the band, Anneke took on responsibility for the great majority of the lyrics, revealing not only her distinctive vocal style but also her skill in writing deep and intimate texts. The evolution at the helm of The Gathering was gradual and fascinating, leading the band to grow both in fan base and live activity. In 1996 she was a guest vocalist for the German band Farmer Boys on the song Never Let Me Down Again (a Depeche Mode cover).

On 6 June 1997, The Gathering released their second album with Anneke, Nighttime Birds. The album sold more than 90,000 copies and led to an extensive European tour. The band gradually made its mark on the scene, driven in large part by its then-unknown but talented vocalist. On How to Measure a Planet?, released on 26 January 1998, further evolution was evident, with Anneke exploring intense and varied vocalisations. That same year she was invited by Dutch multi-instrumentalist Arjen Anthony Lucassen to take part in his Ayreon project, recording vocals for Into the Electric Castle, a concept album about an alien entity kidnapping eight human souls from different eras. Anneke portrayed an Egyptian woman from the age of the pharaohs.

With if_then_else, released on 25 July 2000, Anneke was going through a difficult period in her personal life, during which she again experimented with changes in her singing and songwriting. At the time the end of her engagement was reflected in several lyrics, with the singer working up to 15 hours a day in the studio. The effort resulted in a deeply personal record that is nonetheless considered of the highest quality.

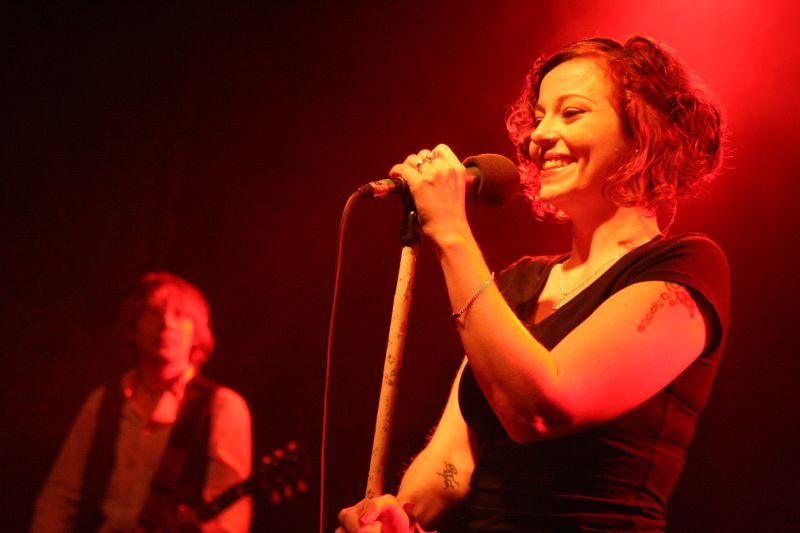
Anneke with The Gathering, 2006.

On 12 February 2003 the band released the acclaimed album Souvenirs. That same year, on 22 August 2003, The Gathering made their first live recording, the semi-acoustic Sleepy Buildings, recorded at The LUX Theatre in Nijmegen, Netherlands. Over time, Anneke consolidated her position as one of the finest vocalists in the genre.

On the personal side, Anneke's life was changing for the better. On 11 February 2003 she married drummer, manager and musician Rob Snijders.

In 2004, she was invited by the Dutch indie rock band Lawn to participate in their album Backspace on the song Fix.

In 2006, The Gathering released Home, showcasing a more refined Anneke whose voice at times hovered on a whisper. A maturity gained through years of practice was clearly perceptible. The band toured Europe, North America and South America; after a brief pause for Anneke to treat a bout of laryngitis, they resumed their schedule of shows with European dates and music festivals throughout 2006. In parallel, Anneke contributed vocals to the Drive By Wire project and to John Wetton's album ICON II. Still in 2006, she participated in the album Epicon by the British band Globus, where she sang and co-wrote the lyrics for Mighty Rivers Run, dueted with Christine Navarro on Diem Ex Dei and sang backing vocals on Orchard of Mine. The latter was used in 2007 in one of the trailers for Marvel Studios' film Spider-Man 3, with Anneke's voice featured prominently. She also participated in two songs by the British band Napalm Death.

In 2007, The Gathering toured North America and Canada again, this time alongside the Italian heavy metal band Lacuna Coil. The band was at its peak, internationally known and a reference point for many artists and bands. However, on 5 June 2007, Anneke announced her departure from The Gathering to pursue other projects and spend more time with her family. Her departure took place in August of that year, when she began her new project, Agua de Annique. Despite the announcement, Anneke and The Gathering still released a DVD, A Noise Severe, recorded at Teatro Caupolicán in Santiago, Chile, on 24 March 2007 and released on 31 October of that year.

=== Solo career ===
==== Agua de Annique ====
The first Agua de Annique album was Air, released on 30 October 2007. The band was founded alongside Anneke's husband and drummer Rob Snijders, guitarist Joris Dirks and bassist Jacques de Haard. The album was marked by a more intimate and melancholic atmosphere.

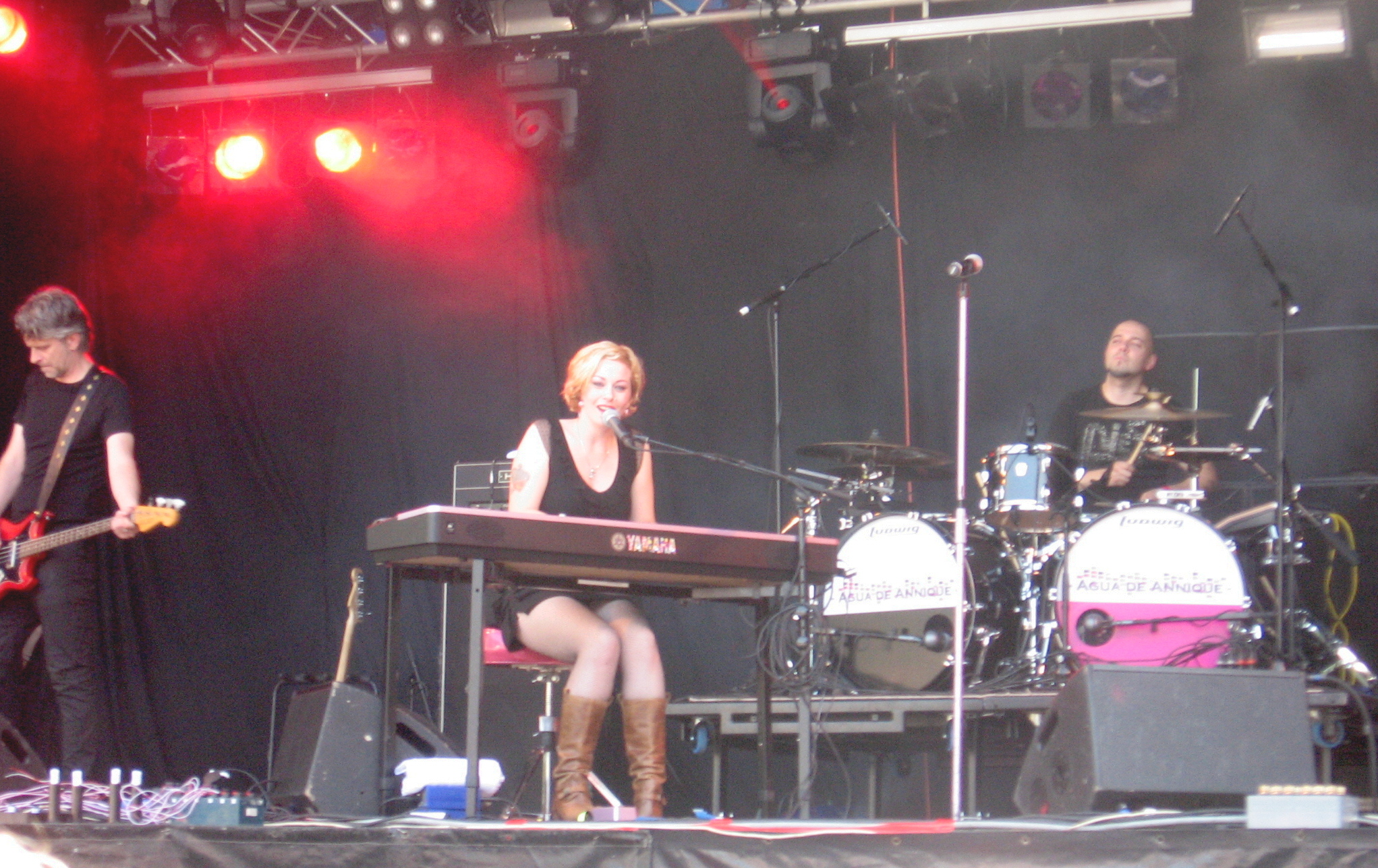
Anneke van Giersbergen & Agua de Annique, 2008

In 2008 she contributed to the album Night Eternal by Portuguese band Moonspell, singing alongside Fernando Ribeiro on Scorpion Flower and appearing in the song's official music video. Also in February 2008, she performed Somewhere alongside Sharon den Adel of Within Temptation at the concert that would become the album and DVD/Blu-ray Black Symphony. The show took place at Ahoy, Netherlands, on 22–24 September 2008.

That same year, Anneke participated in the Ticket for Tibet project, which brought together several of the leading Dutch musicians. The project included a special performance, called Night of Tibet, for the Tibetan Buddhist spiritual leader the Dalai Lama. Also in 2008, Anneke participated again in the Ayreon project, on the album 01011001. The character she portrays is one of the Forever, an alien being of the same race that kidnapped her character from Into the Electric Castle.

On 30 January 2009, Anneke released her second solo album, Pure Air. From this release onwards, Anneke began adding her own name to the band name, presenting herself as "Anneke van Giersbergen with Agua de Annique". Following an acoustic direction, the album featured contributions from Sharon den Adel, Danny Cavanagh, Marike Jager, John Wetton, Niels Geusebroek, Arjen Lucassen and Kyteman. Pure Air contains songs from Air in acoustic form and some covers, including Ironic by Alanis Morissette and The Blower's Daughter by Damien Rice. Anneke also released, on 10 September, a live acoustic album entitled In Parallel, in partnership with Danny Cavanagh, guitarist and vocalist of the British band Anathema. The show, which contains songs from The Gathering, Anneke's solo career, Anathema and some covers, was recorded at the Little Devil venue in Tilburg, Netherlands. She was invited by the American post-metal band Giant Squid to participate in their album The Ichthyologist on the song Sevengill. In June, Anneke founded her own studio in the south of the Netherlands, which was named Aguarium through a competition held on her official website.

Later that year, on 6 October, Anneke released another studio album of original material, In Your Room. This time, Anneke adopted the name "Anneke van Giersbergen & Agua de Annique" and for the first time revealed a more pop rock sensibility that would become a tendency in her future recordings. The album's closing track, Just Fine, was co-written with Canadian vocalist, guitarist, songwriter and producer Devin Townsend, marking the beginning of a long and fruitful partnership. Even before recording In Your Room, Anneke had participated in Devin Townsend's album Addicted!, following a remarkable coincidence.

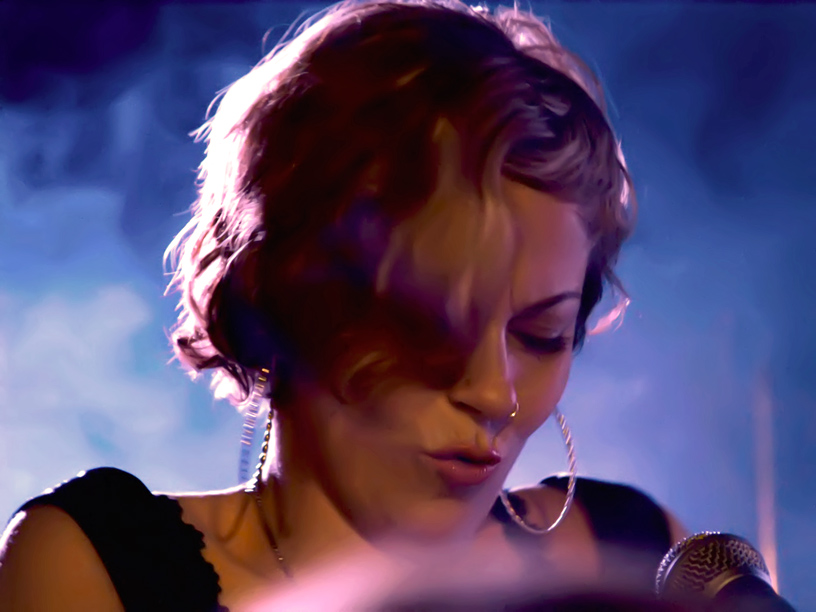
Anneke van Giersbergen, 2009

I was already familiar with her work. In 1994, The Gathering and Strapping Young Lad both signed to Century Media. I spent a lot of time listening to the Mandylion album at that point, but I had never met her personally. Some people choose to believe in destiny, and some choose to believe in free will. I'm somewhere in the middle. My meeting with Anneke is best described as destiny. Up until two weeks before I was going to record the vocals for Addicted! I knew I wanted a strong female presence. The concept of the album, in a way, explores the dichotomy between masculine and feminine, and how addiction in general is not gender-specific. Having a woman was always on the cards, but nothing seemed to be right. Two weeks before I started the vocals I received an unexpected e-mail from Anneke with a YouTube video of her singing one of my older songs. She said that if I was interested in working with her at some point I should consider her. So I e-mailed her and told her to come to Canada the following week. "I have an album I would love you to do." I am happy with her performance. I always loved her voice, and having that strong feminine counterpart... I couldn't have asked for anything better.
Devin Townsend explains how Anneke came to participate in the album Addicted!.

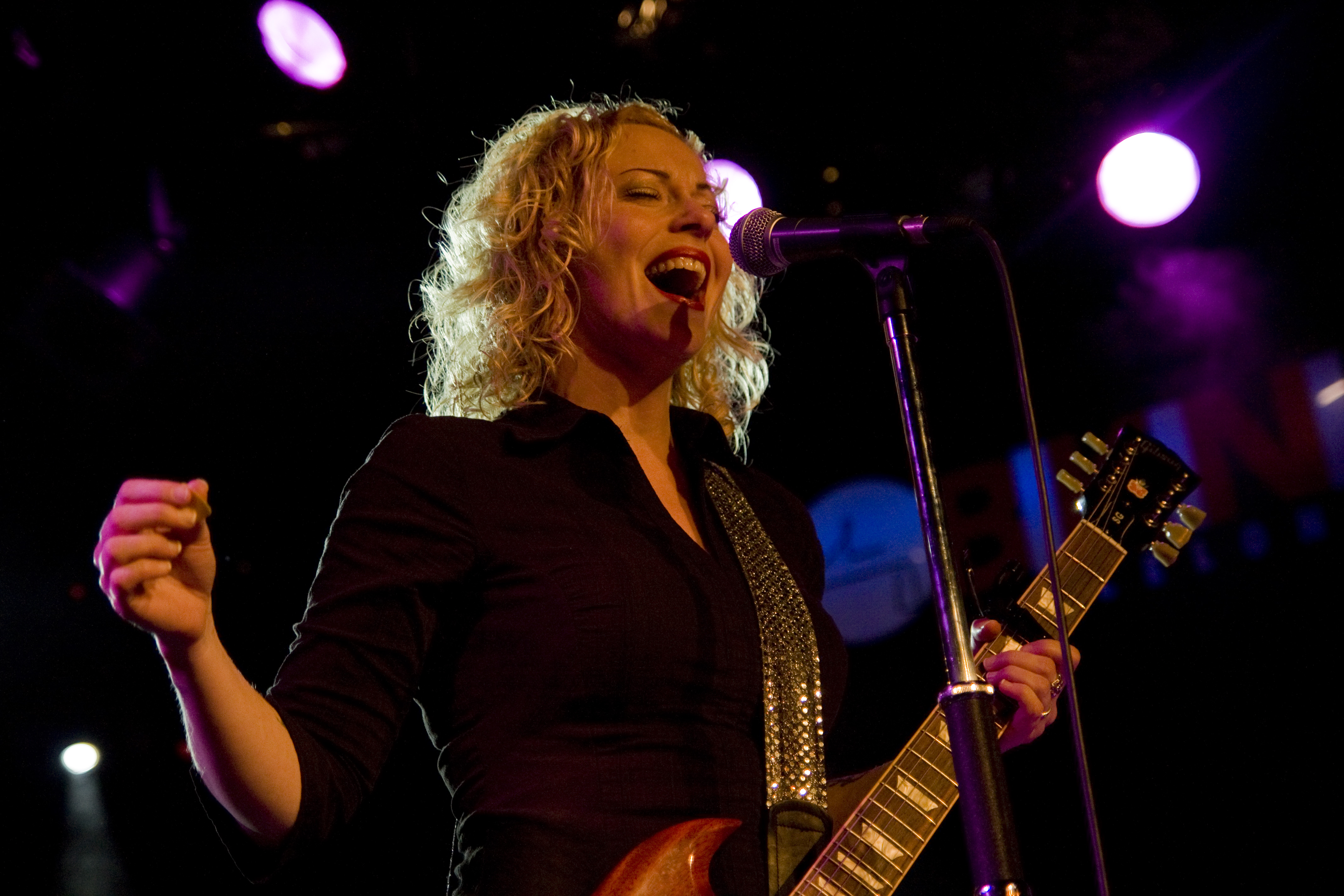
Anneke van Giersbergen, 2010

Also in 2009, on 30 October, Anneke participated in Within Temptation's live acoustic album An Acoustic Night at the Theatre, singing Somewhere as a duet with Sharon den Adel. The show was recorded at the Muziekcentrum Frits Philips in Eindhoven, Netherlands, and released in audio format only.

In 2010, the singer continued to make guest appearances. At the invitation of Dutch-Canadian singer, songwriter, producer and photographer Shane Shu, she recorded an acoustic version of the song Push Me to the Ground. She also participated in the Maiden uniteD project, which presents acoustic versions of songs by British heavy metal band Iron Maiden. Anneke sang on To Tame a Land (a duet with Damian Wilson) and Sun and Steel.

That same year, Anneke released the album Live in Europe, containing recordings of her own songs and songs from The Gathering in several European countries. This was the last release under the Agua de Annique name.

I felt that the live album Live in Europe closed a chapter. My new album has a new sound and anyway I think a lot of people didn't understand the fact that I started working under a nickname. I think I was afraid of being the captain of my own ship, and choosing a band name seemed to make sense at the time, but now I feel confident enough to show the world: This is me!.
Anneke on abandoning the Agua de Annique name.

==== Anneke van Giersbergen ====
In 2012, Anneke released the acclaimed album Everything Is Changing, produced by Portuguese musician Daniel Cardoso (Anathema), with whom she also co-wrote some of the compositions. This is the first work in which the singer chose to use only her own name, Anneke van Giersbergen. The influence of her collaborations with Devin Townsend is perceptible, with the songs becoming more progressive and featuring electronic arrangements. In 2011, Anneke had participated in the children's project De Beer Die Geen Beer Was, in partnership with drummer, actor, singer, producer and presenter Martijn Bosman, which tells the story of a bear in various adventures. Anneke not only sang some of the songs and recited poems on the album, but also participated in some of the performances during the Dutch tour that same year. She also recorded the song Mighty Rivers for the album Raised in Captivity by British vocalist, bassist and guitarist John Wetton. Also in 2011, she participated in the song What Could Have Been from the album Aphotic by American doom metal band Novembers Doom, and on the album Days to Come by Dutch musician Marcel Verbeek, singing Little Man.

That same year, Anneke collaborated once again with Yoav Goren on The Promise, the lead track from the second Globus album, Break From This World. She co-wrote the lyrics and was a featured vocalist in a duet with Lisbeth Scott. Anneke also sang on Everwake on the orchestral re-interpretation album by British progressive rock band Anathema, Falling Deeper, released on 5 September 2011. Before the year ended, Anneke participated in a live recording by Devin Townsend called By a Thread – Live in London, performing several of his albums in full, including the acclaimed Addicted!, which featured Anneke. She also participated in the album You May Never Know What Happiness Is by Dutch pop rock band Lorrainville, with lead and backing vocals on every song.

In 2012, Anneke appeared as a guest vocalist on the debut album of The Human Experimente project, which also features Robert Fripp of King Crimson, John Wetton of Asia and King Crimson, Maynard James Keenan of Tool, A Perfect Circle and Puscifer, Adrian Belew, Sean Kingston and Dann Pursey of Globus and Vantan. Also in 2012, Anneke collaborated once again with Devin Townsend on the album Epicloud. Anneke sang on virtually every track, including all songs on the demo album Epiclouder. She also collaborated with Dutch musician and producer DJ Hidden on the electronic music album Lights Off: Only You Can See, singing Only You Can See. Before the year ended, Anneke dueted with vocalist Kristin Fjellseth of Norwegian alternative rock band Pale Forest on Mandrake Makes a Hypnotic Gesture and Envy from the album Second Hand Balloons. She also participated in the live album Some December Evening by Lorrainville, singing on virtually the entire show.

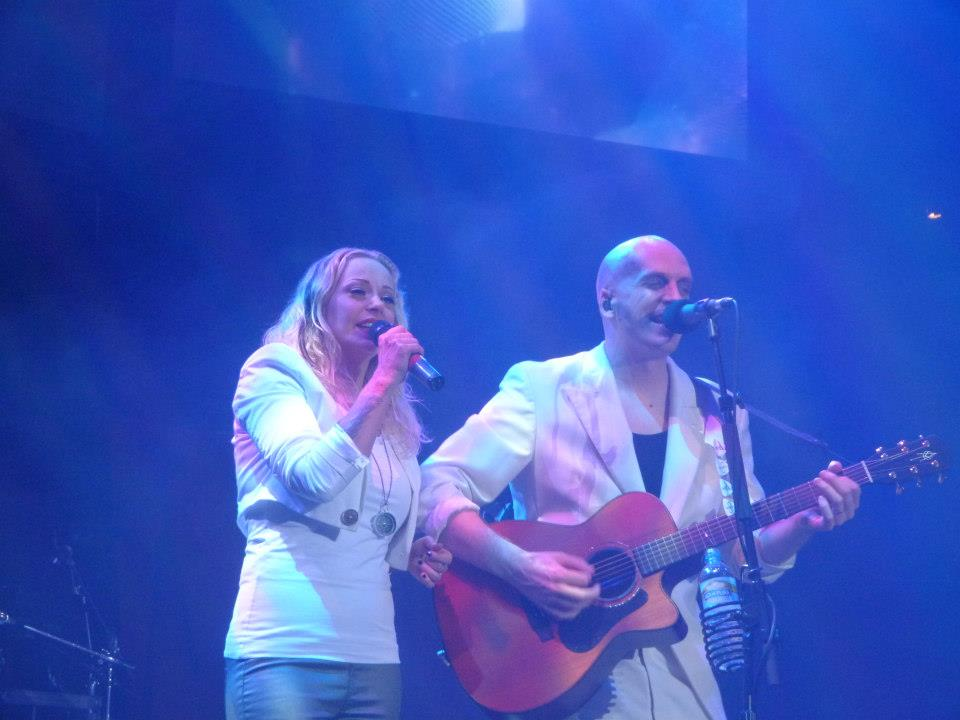
Anneke van Giersbergen & Devin Townsend, live at The Retinal Circus, 2014.

In January 2013, Anneke received two Edison Award nominations, the most important music prize in the Netherlands, in the categories "Best Female Artist" and "Best Album" for Everything Is Changing. She also co-wrote and provided vocals for the theme song of Dutch film &Me, Please Baby Don't, and filmed a music video featuring scenes from the film. She also sang on I'm So Real by DJ Tronik. Once again, Anneke was invited by Devin Townsend to participate in a DVD project, The Retinal Circus, singing on several songs during the show.

That same year, Anneke released the studio album Drive on 20 September 2013. Unlike its predecessor, Drive has a more organic and direct sound and was recorded with all instruments played simultaneously in the same room. Drive was her first work with InsideOut Music and was produced by Arno Krabman. Turkish singer and multi-instrumentalist Hayko Cepkin appears on Mental Jungle. Before the year closed, Anneke also participated in Funeral from the album Make Your Own by French death metal band For Many Reasons.

In 2014, Anneke participated in the album The Act of Letting Go by the Cellarscape project, on the song The Same Place. She also joined the The Power of Love project, which brought together various Dutch rock and metal musicians in support of victims of sexual abuse in conflict zones. Also in 2014, she participated once again in a Devin Townsend album, Z², singing on all songs of disc 1, Sky Blue, and on some songs of disc 2, Dark Matters. Before year's end, she participated in the second studio album by Dutch band Lorrainville, Desire the Reckless, with lead and backing vocals. In November 2014, Anneke rejoined her former band The Gathering for two special shows bringing together all current and former members to celebrate the band's 25th anniversary. Called TG25: Live at Doornroosje, the shows featured songs from the band's entire history, performed as duets and collaborations among all the musicians who had ever been part of it.

In 2015, Anneke participated in the album Death is Just a Feeling by Turkish artist Amadeus Awad, singing on Opia, Sleep Paralysis and Lonesome Clown. That same year, she participated in the project The Theatre Equation, a musical based on the Ayreon album The Human Equation and staged in the Netherlands, portraying the character "Fear", replacing vocalist Mikael Åkerfeldt of Swedish death metal band Opeth.

In 2016, Anneke collaborated again with Devin Townsend on the album Transcendence.

In September 2017, she performed in the "Ayreon Universe" concert series at the 013 venue in Tilburg, Netherlands.

In 2018, she contributed her voice to the track Amongst Stars from the album Queen of Time by Finnish heavy metal band Amorphis, also appearing in the official music video.

In 2019, she collaborated once again with Devin Townsend on the album Empath. That same year, she joined the North American tour of Amorphis and Delain, presenting a solo set and performing Amongst Stars alongside Amorphis during their set.

On 26 February 2021, Anneke released The Darkest Skies Are The Brightest via InsideOut Music, her 23rd career album. The album was born from a period of personal crisis: in 2018, after self-financing the VUUR debut album and realising that a second venture would entail even greater financial risks, Anneke also found herself facing difficulties in her marriage. As a way of recovery, she retreated alone to a small house near a forest on the outskirts of Eindhoven and began composing with no intention of turning the songs into a full album — just an acoustic guitar and basic recording gear. In 2020, she invited her friend and producer Gijs Coolen to help polish the material, and eleven of the compositions became the album.

Musically, the album follows a more melancholic and intimate path compared to the progressive metal ventures that preceded it: it features mainly acoustic guitars, strings, brass and percussion, with all music and lyrics composed by Anneke herself. The title refers to the idea that, when facing personal challenges, we are forced to find answers to life's biggest questions. Also in 2021, Anneke appeared on the popular Dutch television programme Beste Zangers, where she made a strong impression on a wide and diverse audience.

In 2025, Anneke began an ambitious new solo project conceived as a trilogy. The series La Vie, La Mort, L'Amour — French for "Life, Death, Love" — traces an intimate emotional journey of love, loss and grief, inspired by the death of both her parents within just two months of each other. The first EP, La Vie, released on 28 February 2025, comprises four tracks: "One More Nanosecond", "When I Die", "More Than a Thousand Words" and "Heal Me". According to Anneke, the songs were recorded with her eight-piece live band and were musically inspired by the sounds of the 1980s and 1990s.

The second EP, La Mort, was released on 27 March 2026, with a special vinyl edition for Record Store Day on 18 April. Its four tracks are "Fade In Fade Out", "Handle Me with Care", "Red Sky" and "Sail Towards the Sun". The EP was recorded during an uninterrupted week in the studio with members of the live band, lending the material an organic character close to a live performance. The track "Sail Towards the Sun", according to Anneke, is a farewell to her father: he had built his own seaworthy sailboat with his own hands and the family spent many holidays sailing together. The third EP, as yet untitled, will be released simultaneously with a complete physical edition of the trilogy — as a CD Digipak and Gatefold LP — expected in 2027.

=== Side projects ===
Between 2014 and 2016, Anneke was involved in several side projects, including The Sirens, The Gentle Storm, Verloren Verleden and De Nieuwe Madonna.

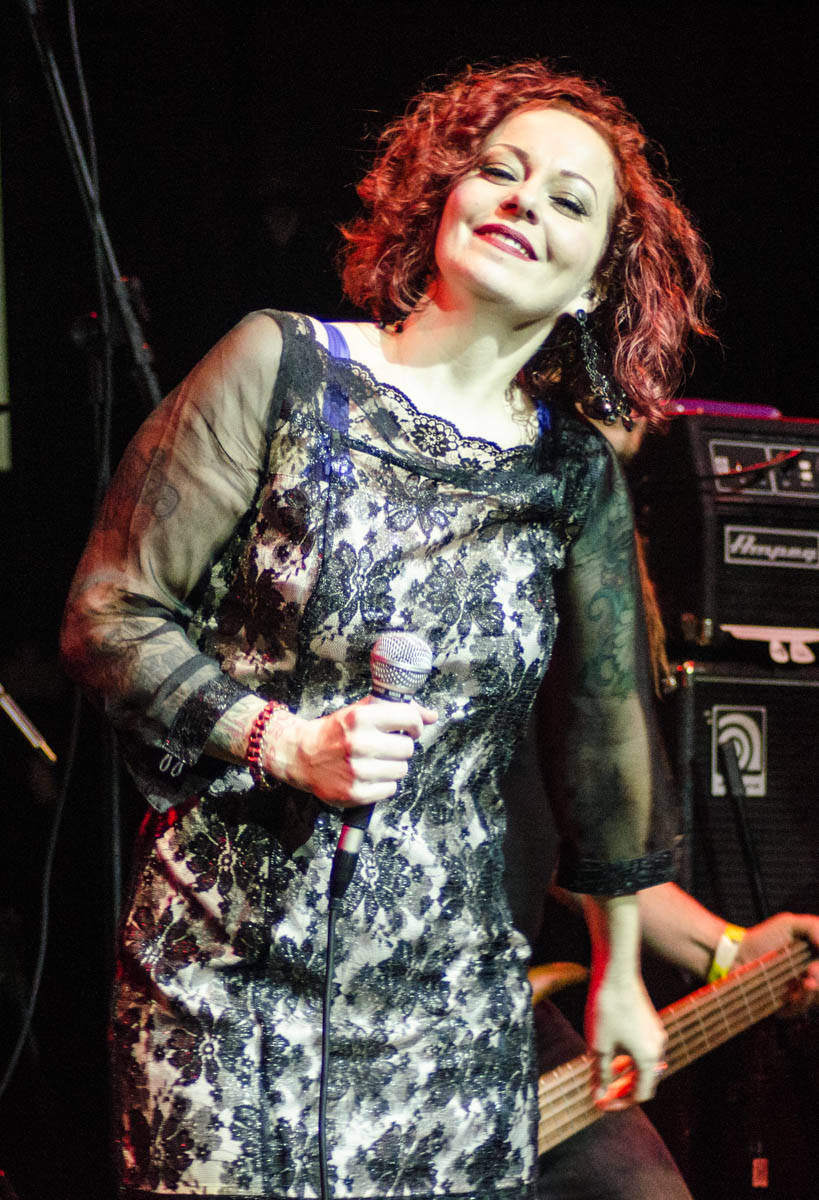
Anneke at The Sirens show in São Paulo, 2015.

==== The Sirens ====
On 4 June 2014, Anneke announced a new project in partnership with vocalists Liv Kristine (ex-Theatre of Tragedy, Leaves' Eyes) and Kari Rueslåtten (ex-The 3rd and the Mortal) called The Sirens. The project brought together the three considered pioneers of the female-fronted metal style, going on tour to perform songs from their former bands and current solo careers. Exclusively for the project, they presented three original songs: Embracing the Seasons, composed by Anneke; Sisters of the Earth, composed by Liv; and Fearless, composed by Kari. The Sirens toured various European countries and undertook a South American tour, including two shows in Brazil in February 2015. They also appeared at several European summer festivals, opening a show for Finnish band Nightwish on 29 August 2015. Coincidentally, that band was primarily inspired by the three bands represented by The Sirens' three vocalists, as stated by its creator Tuomas Holopainen:

"At the time, The Third and the Mortal, Theatre of Tragedy and The Gathering were an inspiration for him to write his own material."
Tuomas Holopainen biography on his official website.

==== The Gentle Storm ====
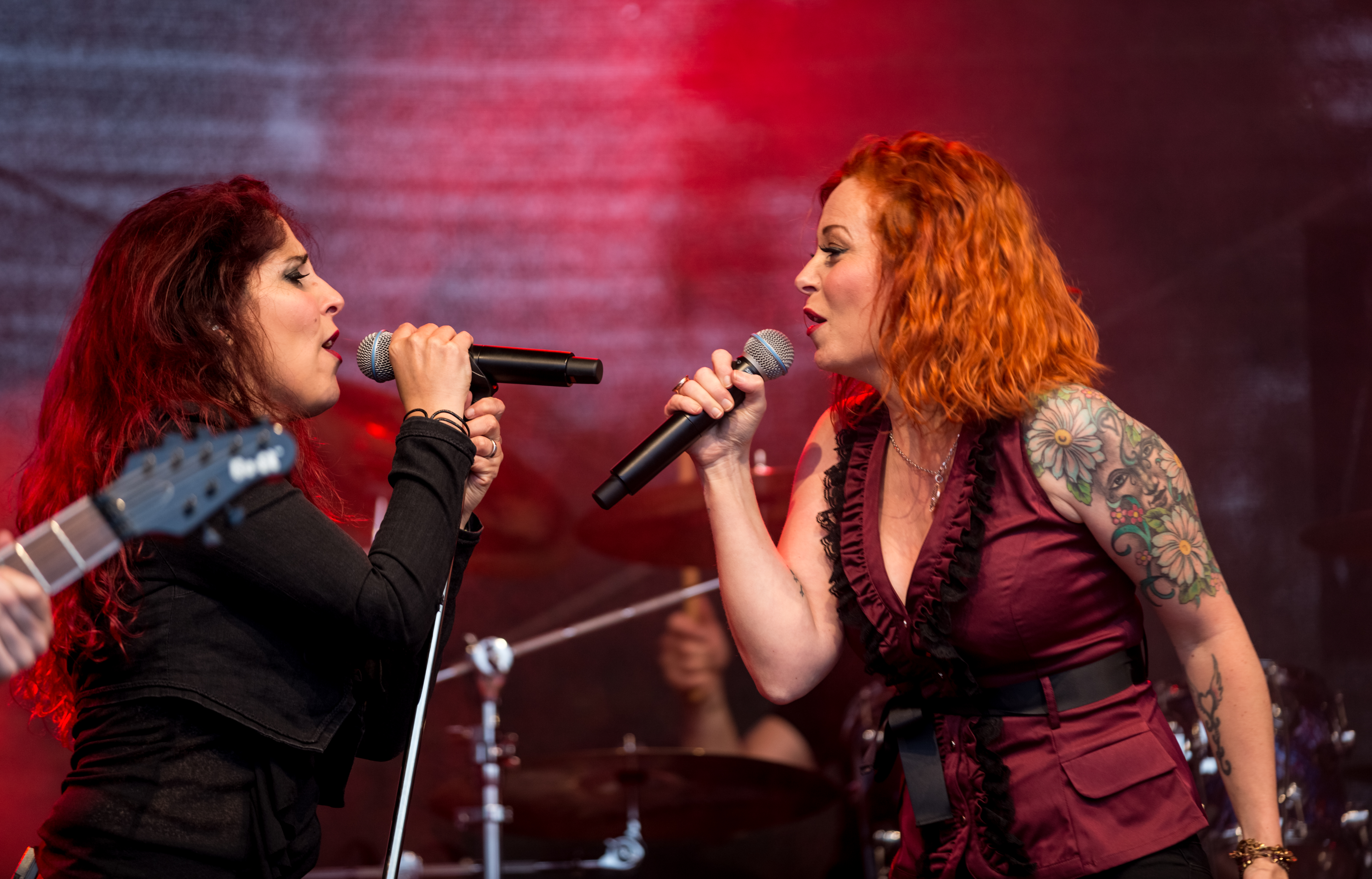
The Gentle Storm at Wacken Open Air festival, 2015.

On 22 April of that year, Arjen Anthony Lucassen (creator of the Ayreon project) revealed that his next project would be a collaboration with Anneke van Giersbergen, their third work together after the Ayreon albums Into the Electric Castle and 01011001. He described it as "an epic double concept album". The album, called The Diary, featured two discs with the same 11 tracks in different arrangements: one heavier, oriented towards progressive and symphonic metal, and one lighter, acoustic and folk.

"The concept of the album is a tale of love, loss and separation told through the story of two fictional lovers from the 17th century. A Dutch sailor embarks on a two-year voyage, leaving his wife at home in the Netherlands. The only way the couple can communicate and keep their love alive during the long separation is through letters. These letters form the basis for the songs on the album."
Anneke in her newsletter in late 2014.

Arjen and Anneke undertook a small acoustic European tour in early 2015 before the album's release on 23 March 2015. The album was very well received by critics and audiences, leading to an extensive tour that ran from early 2015 into 2016, covering many European countries and several in the Americas, including the United States, Chile, Argentina and Brazil.

==== Verloren Verleden ====
In 2015, Anneke announced a new album in partnership with the Icelandic folk band Árstíðir. The project, called Verloren Verleden (Lost Past in Dutch), presented contemporary arrangements of classical arias. The album was released on 12 February 2016 and was followed by a Dutch theatre tour in March of that year.

==== De Nieuwe Madonna ====
After the success of the almost entirely sold-out tour alongside Árstíðir, Anneke announced in April 2016 a new acoustic tour of Dutch theatres, this time themed around the 1980s. The tour, called De Nieuwe Madonna (The New Madonna in Dutch), revived classic songs from that decade while seeking to recreate on stage the teenager's bedroom she grew up in, complete with posters of her favourite artists, her bed, skates and personal items. Once again the tour, which ran from 30 September to 25 November, was almost entirely sold out.

Also in 2016, Anneke was a guest of honour at Veteranendag, an event hosted by the King of the Netherlands in honour of the country's war veterans. In addition to performing the country's national anthems (old and current), Anneke sang other songs in tribute to those present. The event was broadcast live across the country.

As for collaborations with other artists, in 2016 she also participated in another Devin Townsend studio album, Transcendence, released on 9 September. In addition, Anneke recorded vocals for several songs on the album Silk by Dutch musician Peter Slager. She also lent her voice and image to the live shows of Dutch singer Paskal Jakobsen, which were projected onto a replica of an old painting on the concert stage.

To close 2016, Anneke hosted the first Anneke van Giersbergen Fan Weekend, an exclusive weekend programme for a select number of fans, consisting of shared accommodation at a hotel in Amsterdam, canal boat trips, karaoke, dinners and full access — including backstage — to the final show of The Gentle Storm's The Diary tour, which took place on 17 December.

==== Inchecken ====
To celebrate her 25 years of career, Anneke undertook an extensive tour of 44 shows at Dutch theatres with an acoustic repertoire spanning her entire career. Simultaneously, she released an acoustic album with 11 acoustic re-recordings of career highlights, including songs from The Gathering, Devin Townsend, VUUR, Lorrainville, BLØF and her solo catalogue.

==== Avicii Tribute and Anneke Goes To Church Tour ====
In 2020, Anneke performed a series of concerts alongside singer Niels Geusebroek, accompanied by the Noord Nederlands Orkest, as a tribute to Swedish DJ Avicii, who had passed away in 2018.

Also in 2020, Anneke announced a series of concerts at Dutch churches and cathedrals. Initially scheduled to begin in March of that year, the tour was postponed due to the COVID-19 pandemic, which caused the cancellation and rescheduling of all public events worldwide. The tour was rescheduled for September and October. Before the postponement, more than half the concerts had already sold out.

Other events she was scheduled to take part in — including a short acoustic tour of Norway in May and a Portuguese progressive metal festival — were also postponed.

During the quarantine period, Anneke remained at her home and studio, composing and recording new songs for her future solo album.

=== VUUR ===
On 1 December 2016, Anneke announced through her social media the creation of her new band, VUUR (fire in Dutch, also interpreted as meaning "passion" or "unity" — chosen as a name representing Anneke's metal side). In a presentation video that revisited many eras and collaborations from Anneke's musical life, it was emphasised that VUUR would not simply be another of the singer's projects, but a permanent new band. The group was composed mostly of Anneke's former partners from The Gentle Storm live band:

- Anneke Van Giersbergen – lead vocals
- Ed Warby (ex-Ayreon, The Gentle Storm) – drums
- Johan van Stratum (ex-Stream of Passion, The Gentle Storm) – bass
- Ferry Duijsens (Anneke van Giersbergen, The Gentle Storm, The Sirens) – guitar
- Jord Otto (ex-ReVamp) – guitar

In the same announcement, Anneke confirmed that recording would begin in early 2017, with the first album expected for autumn of that year (spring in the Southern Hemisphere). Anneke described her new band as follows:

"It's like I'm looking for contradictions," says Anneke about dividing her focus in two. "I want the heavy to be really heavy, and the acoustic and soft things I can do to be almost silent and introspective. I'm trying to find the outer limits. I'm still writing and collaborating with different people, so the style of VUUR is still a different style from The Gathering or The Gentle Storm. You could say that the music of VUUR has the melancholy of The Gathering and many elements of The Gentle Storm, but it is a little darker and with fewer folk elements. It's still melodic and warm, but heavy."
Anneke in an interview for Blabbermouth, 2016.

On the same day as the band's announcement, their first show was also revealed: 24 July 2017, at the Masters of Rock festival in the Czech Republic. Many festival dates were announced thereafter.

Initially, Marcela Bovio (ex-Stream of Passion, MaYan) was also to be part of the band. However, on 11 June 2017, Marcela announced her departure, amid the recording sessions, citing musical differences. Despite the second vocalist's departure, the album continued in production, with the band's first show taking place before its release, on 9 June 2017, at Neushoorn, Netherlands. On 2 June the band presented their first track, Days Go By - London, making clear that the band would be oriented towards progressive metal.

VUUR performed numerous shows at festivals and on their own tours across Europe, North America, South America, Japan and other countries, also touring alongside bands such as Epica and Delain. On 27 November 2019, Anneke posted on her Facebook that she had decided to release a solo album rather than continue with VUUR, which would go on hiatus.

=== Mandylion 30th anniversary shows (2025–2026) ===
In December 2024, The Gathering announced the reunion of the classic Mandylion line-up — including Anneke van Giersbergen on vocals, Hugo Prinsen Geerligs on bass, Frank Boeijen on keyboards and backing vocals, Hans Rutten on drums, René Rutten on guitar and Jelmer Wiersma on guitar — for a series of shows commemorating the album's 30th anniversary.

The idea arose spontaneously during informal conversations among the band members, when they realised that Mandylion was approaching its thirtieth anniversary and decided to mark the occasion with something special. The album is considered the milestone of The Gathering's international breakthrough.

The reunion began with a warm-up show on 29 June 2025 at Dynamo in Eindhoven, followed by five sold-out performances at Doornroosje in Nijmegen, Netherlands, between 27 and 31 August 2025. The shows presented the complete Mandylion tracklist, along with other songs from the period when van Giersbergen was part of the band.

The overwhelming response from audiences led to an extensive run of shows at festivals and venues in 2026, with dates across Europe, North America and South America. The 2026 European tour opened on 19 May at the O2 Shepherd's Bush Empire in London and included stops in Paris, Pratteln (Switzerland), Milan, Lyon, Luxembourg, festivals such as Sweden Rock, Hellfest, Graspop and Wacken Open Air, as well as dates in Istanbul, Budapest, Lisbon and Cartagena.

At the shows, Anneke van Giersbergen demonstrated a remarkably well-preserved voice, while the band underscored the timeless quality of the material. The performances featured elaborate visual support with projections of lunar landscapes, cosmic imagery and cinematic colour fields, consistent with the atmospheric character of the music.

The tour concluded with a show at Movistar Arena in Santiago, Chile, on 17 October 2026, followed by a final performance at AFAS Live in Amsterdam on 16 January 2027, which also celebrated the 30th anniversary of Nighttime Birds, the 1997 follow-up album. In total, the series amounted to approximately 29 performances worldwide.

== Vocal range ==
Anneke's vocal range was formerly classified as soprano. However, over the years her register dropped somewhat, leading to her reclassification as a mezzo-soprano.

Well, I used to be soprano when I was younger. But my voice dropped a little bit, because I'm now older and because I also didn't train to stay up. With training, you expand your reach. But I didn't really think to do that. So I just sing what I sing. I sing what I write and this is how I train my voice. So I dropped too. I don't know what you call it in a logical way: mezzo-soprano. It's a little bit lower.
Anneke to Femme Metal Webzine, 2013.

Her vocal range spans from C3 to A5.

=== Highest notes ===
Below is a list of some of Anneke's highest recorded notes:

- A5: Nighttime Birds
- G♯5: To Catch a Thief
- G5: When I'm Laid in Earth (live), Morphias Waltz, In Deference
- F♯5: Tunnel of Light, Supercrush!, Hyperdrive!, Numbered!, Feel Alive
- F5: Slow Me Down, To Catch a Thief, Save Our Now, Grace (live Retinal Circus), Strange Machines (live Pinkpop 1997)
- E5: Stonegarden (live 2003), In Motion #1, In Motion #2, I Wake Up, Hope, Pray, Dance, Play, Waking Dreams, ...Alone, Scorpion Flower
- E♭5: You Want to Be Free, Hold On, Somewhere (live), Feel Alive, Supercrush!, Circles, Take Me Home, On Most Surfaces, By Your Command (live Tuska)
- D5: Leaves, On Most Surfaces, These Good People, Fear the Sea, The Big Sleep, Tunnel of Light, Too Late, My Boy, Sand and Mercury, Strange Machines, Sevengill, Red is a Slow Colour, Saturnine, 1000 Miles Away from You, When I'm Laid in Earth (live), Shortest Day, In Power We Entrust the Love Advocated, Resolve!, Scorpion Flower, Liberation, Everything Is Changing
- C♯5: Analog Park, Circles, Hyperdrive!, Numbered, Eleanor, Awake!, The Mirror Waters (live 2003), Adore, Ice Water, Grace, Rollercoaster
- C5: Nighttime Birds, Kevin's Telescope, Saturnine, Third Chance, Morphias Waltz, Rescue Me, Everwake, Valley of the Queens, Hold On, Angel, Tunnel of Light, Travel

=== Lowest notes ===
Below is a list of some of Anneke's lowest recorded notes:

- G♯3: Angel, Numbered!, In Between, Box, The Mirror Waters (live 2003)
- G3: Amity, Even the Spirits Are Afraid, Frail, New Moon Different Day, Take Care of Me, Solace, Rollercoaster, Your Troubles Are Over, Kevin's Telescope, Strange Machines, Morphias Waltz, Too Late, Slow Me Down, Tears of Joy
- F♯3: Eleanor, These Good People, Adore, We Just Stopped Breathing, In Deference, Shortest Day, Grace, In Between, Ironic
- F3: Sand and Mercury, Shot to Pieces, Your Troubles Are Over, Black Light District
- E3: I Wake Up, Wonder, Asleep, In Between, Rollercoaster, Eleanor
- E♭3: The World, Supercrush!, Day After Yesterday
- D3: Home (live 2006)
- C3: Solace, Rollercoaster

== Musical roots and influences ==
Anneke's musical roots lie in European classical music and jazz, but she has been most involved with rock and pop. Her main influences are Prince, Ella Fitzgerald and Thom Yorke (Radiohead). She is also a fan of Barbra Streisand.

== Reception and place in the scene ==
Anneke has always held a prominent position among female vocalists in rock and heavy metal. She is considered to this day one of the pioneers of women occupying space in this musical scene. For this reason, she is frequently the subject of comparisons with bands of similar styles.

I think the comparisons are not so unlikely, because we also started as a rock band, but have changed since then. We tried other styles of music and our music today is completely different from what we did 12 years ago.
Anneke on the comparisons of The Gathering with Dutch bands Within Temptation and After Forever.

In 2026, Loudwire ranked her as the 6th greatest progressive rock singer of all time.

The artist is constantly cited by other musicians in the genre:

"Massive voice!"
Tarja on Anneke

"Anneke is one of my favourite singers."
Tarja on Anneke

"It's an honour to work with her and she has a beautiful, beautiful energy."
Devin Townsend on Anneke

"The power that comes out of you magnifies anything that I do."
Devin Townsend on Anneke

"I write so much music with female vocals in mind that it's great to have someone I could rely on to do that."
Devin Townsend on Anneke

"I have many inspirations — everything I listen to also constitutes a source of inspiration on some level. But I love artists like Anneke van Giersbergen."
Floor Jansen (ex-After Forever, ex-ReVamp, Nightwish) on Anneke

"We have been privileged to work with Anneke before, so it was natural to ask her. As everyone knows her voice is more than stunning and she is surrounded by an incredibly positive aura."
Esa Holopainen (Amorphis) on Anneke, when announcing the collaboration on Amongst Stars (2018)

"Enchanting!"
Amanda Somerville (Trillium) on Anneke

"My greatest inspiration is Anneke van Giersbergen, former vocalist of The Gathering. I heard her sing in 1996 with an orchestra instead of her band, and I was struck by the sound of her voice. I still think she is one of the greatest singers of all time."
Manda Ophuis (Nemesea) on Anneke

"Anneke is a pitch-perfect singer and her voice has a wonderful deep vibrato."
Arjen Anthony Lucassen (Ayreon) on Anneke

"Anneke's got an amazing instrument in her voice, and I wanted to showcase that by giving her strong melodies to sing."
Arjen Anthony Lucassen (Ayreon) on Anneke, speaking about The Gentle Storm project

"My favourite female singer."
Arjen Anthony Lucassen (Ayreon) when announcing the collaboration with Anneke in 2014

"Anneke is one of the best female singers I have ever worked with."
Arjen Anthony Lucassen (Ayreon) when announcing The Gentle Storm tour in 2015

Beyond the admiration of fellow musicians, it is notable that Anneke maintains friendships with some of them:

I talked to my friend Anneke about it, because she was also pregnant on stage. She told me that her son was really quiet during the heavy songs, and when she did ballads he would start kicking and become active. But so far I haven't felt any movement during the shows — outside of the stage, I have.
Simone Simons of Epica, to the website Blabbermouth.

Anneke also speaks openly about her pioneering role in the scene:

When I and other women were the first ones in this scene — kind of as lead singers — I liked the attention. It was something new with The Gathering. And we didn't plan on it.
Anneke on being one of the first female vocalists in metal.

The metal and prog world is like a brotherhood. And very female friendly in general. I truly love being part of it!
Anneke in an interview with Guitar Girl Magazine (2018).

== Social causes and politics ==
Anneke organised a show, together with other musicians, to raise funds for the victims of the 2010 earthquake in Chile. The show, called "Concert for Chile", was held on 24 March in Amsterdam. In addition to the musicians who accompany her in Agua de Annique, the event featured Danny Cavanagh of Anathema and Simone Simons of Epica, among other artists. Anneke also announced that the proceeds from sales of her new single, Sunny Side Up, would be donated to the same cause.

Anneke has rarely spoken about her political views.

I think Obama is the hero of the year. In fact, politics is crap, as are the politicians themselves, but it gives some hope and I like that. He's a very relaxed kind of guy, especially for an American. I also loved the time of Bill Clinton, who was very sympathetic and human and thought much more positively, although he was also a leader at the same time. I would like to put Obama in a similar category, because he has a similar purpose. Our world has become very busy, always moving and there are many trends and influences today. I hope that Obama brings back the necessary rest, one way or another. I think the world should be governed with a calm, gentle hand, no matter the country. I am confident he can be the person to take the next step in the right direction.
Anneke to Sound2Move, shortly after the election of Barack Obama as President of the United States.

Anneke also participated in 2018 and 2019 in the Nacht van de Vluchteling (Night of the Refugee), an annual event organised by the Stichting Vluchteling in the Netherlands that consists of a collective night walk with routes of 10, 20 or 40 kilometres to raise funds for emergency aid to refugees worldwide. In 2019, Anneke completed the 40-kilometre route.

== Documentary ==
Over two and a half years, journalist and filmmaker Peter Blok followed Anneke in her daily routine and produced a documentary titled A Nightingale Fluttering from Metal to Classical and Back. Peter followed Anneke from her project with Icelandic group Árstíðir, with whom she recorded the album Verloren Verleden (2016) and toured Dutch theatres. The documentary also captures some of the smaller, more private shows Anneke performed during that period, the creative process behind and recording of the first VUUR album, the first Anneke van Giersbergen Fan Weekend (2016), VUUR's first solo and festival shows (2017), radio appearances, some days off, the De Nieuwe Madonna tour, her appearance at Veteranendag (an event hosted by the King of the Netherlands in honour of war veterans) and the rehearsals and excerpts from her 25th anniversary concerts with the Residentie Orkest (Resident Orchestra). The documentary, with English subtitles, was released in 21 episodes on the filmmaker's Vimeo channel, with the intention of being commercially released with additional unseen footage in the future.

== Discography ==
=== Agua de Annique / Anneke van Giersbergen ===
==== Studio albums ====
Year	Album	Band/Project	Involvement
2007	Air	Agua de Annique	compositions, vocals, piano
2009	Pure Air	Anneke van Giersbergen with Agua de Annique	compositions, vocals, piano
2009	In Your Room	Anneke van Giersbergen & Agua de Annique	compositions, vocals, keyboards, piano, acoustic guitar
2012	Everything Is Changing	Anneke van Giersbergen	compositions, vocals, guitar, keyboards, piano, acoustic guitar
2013	Drive	Anneke van Giersbergen	compositions, vocals, piano, acoustic guitar
2021	The Darkest Skies Are the Brightest	Anneke van Giersbergen	compositions, vocals, guitar, bass, percussion
2027	La Vie, La Mort, L'Amour	Anneke van Giersbergen	compositions, vocals, guitar; planned release as a full physical album collecting the three EPs of the trilogy (2025–2026)

==== Live albums ====
Year	Album	Band/Project	Involvement
2010	Live in Europe	Anneke van Giersbergen & Agua de Annique	compositions, vocals, piano
2018	Symphonized	Anneke van Giersbergen with Residentie Orkest The Hague	compositions, vocals; live orchestral album recorded at two shows in May 2018 in The Hague, Netherlands
2019	Inchecken	Anneke van Giersbergen	compositions, vocals, acoustic guitar; acoustic collection of 10 tracks recorded for the eponymous theatre tour, accompanied by guitarist Ferry Duijsens; exclusive tour release, limited edition
2020	Let the Light in	Anneke van Giersbergen with Kamerata Zuid	compositions, vocals; live album with chamber orchestra Kamerata Zuid, recorded at seven concerts in December 2019 in the province of North Brabant, Netherlands; includes own songs with classical arrangements, collaborations and classical arias

==== Singles ====
Year	Single	Album	Band/Project
2007	Day After Yesterday	Air	Agua de Annique
2008	Come Wander with Me	Air	Agua de Annique
2009	The Blower's Daughter	Pure Air	Anneke van Giersbergen with Agua de Annique
2009	Hey Okay!	In Your Room	Anneke van Giersbergen & Agua de Annique
2010	Sunny Side Up	In Your Room	Anneke van Giersbergen & Agua de Annique
2011	Feel Alive	Everything Is Changing	Anneke van Giersbergen
2011	Circles	Everything Is Changing	Anneke van Giersbergen
2013	Drive	Drive	Anneke van Giersbergen
2013	My Mother Said	Drive	Anneke van Giersbergen
2018	Your Glorious Light Will Shine – Helsinki	Symphonized	Anneke van Giersbergen
2018	Zo Lief	Symphonized	Anneke van Giersbergen
2020	My Promise	The Darkest Skies Are the Brightest	Anneke van Giersbergen
2021	Hurricane	The Darkest Skies Are the Brightest	Anneke van Giersbergen
2021	Agape	The Darkest Skies Are the Brightest	Anneke van Giersbergen
2021	Weary	The Darkest Skies Are the Brightest (sessions)	Anneke van Giersbergen
2025	One More Nanosecond	La Vie (EP)	Anneke van Giersbergen
2025	La Vie (EP)	La Vie, La Mort, L'Amour	Anneke van Giersbergen
2026	Red Sky	La Mort (EP)	Anneke van Giersbergen
2026	La Mort (EP)	La Vie, La Mort, L'Amour	Anneke van Giersbergen

=== VUUR ===
==== Studio albums ====
Year	Album	Involvement
2017	In This Moment We Are Free: Cities	compositions, rhythm guitar, vocals

==== EPs ====
Year	Album	Involvement
2017	The Mermaid And The Horseman	compositions, rhythm guitar, vocals

=== The Gathering ===
==== Studio albums ====
Year	Album	Involvement
1995	Mandylion	compositions, vocals
1997	Nighttime Birds	compositions, vocals, guitar
1999	How to Measure a Planet?	compositions, vocals, guitar
2000	if_then_else	compositions, vocals, guitar
2003	Souvenirs	compositions, vocals, guitar
2006	Home	compositions, vocals, guitar, acoustic guitar

==== Live albums ====
Year	Album	Involvement
2000	Superheat	vocals, guitar, acoustic guitar
2004	Sleepy Buildings – A Semi Acoustic Evening	vocals, guitar, acoustic guitar
2007	A Noise Severe	vocals, guitar
2015	TG25: Live at Doornroosje	vocals

==== Compilations ====
Year	Album	Involvement
2004	Black Light District / Monsters	vocals
2005	Accessories: Rarities & B-Sides	vocals, guitar, acoustic guitar
2008	Sand And Mercury – The Complete Century Media Years	vocals, guitar, acoustic guitar
2008	Two 4 One	vocals, guitar
2014	TG25: Diving Into The Unknown	vocals, guitar
2015	Original Album Collection	vocals, guitar, acoustic guitar
2016	Blueprints	vocals

==== EPs ====
Year	Album	Involvement
1996	Adrenaline / Leaves	vocals
2000	Amity	vocals, acoustic guitar
2002	Black Light District	vocals
2003	Monsters EP	vocals
2003	You Learn About It	vocals

==== Singles ====
Year	Single	Album
1995	Strange Machines	Mandylion
1997	Kevin's Telescope	Nighttime Birds
1997	The May Song	Nighttime Birds
1998	Liberty Bell	How to Measure a Planet?
2000	Rollercoaster	if_then_else
2000	Amity	if_then_else
2003	Monsters	Souvenirs
2006	Alone	Home

== Videography ==
=== Agua de Annique / Anneke van Giersbergen ===
==== Music videos ====
- Day After Yesterday (2007)
- Come Wander with Me (2008)
- Wonder (2009)
- Hey Okay! (2009)
- The Blower's Daughter (2009)
- Sunny Side Up (2010)
- Feel Alive (2011)
- Take Me Home (2012)
- The Best is Yet to Come (lyric video) (2013)
- My Mother Said (2013)
- Zo Lief (2018)
- My Promise (2020)
- Hurricane (2021)
- I Saw a Car (2021)
- When I Die (2025)
- Red Sky (2026)

=== The Gentle Storm ===
==== Music videos ====
- Endless Sea – gentle version (lyric video) (2014)
- Endless Sea – storm version (lyric video) (2014)
- Heart of Amsterdam (2014)
- Shores of India (2014)
- The Storm (live) (2014)

=== The Gathering ===
==== Music videos ====
- Leaves (1995)
- Strange Machines (1995) (unreleased)
- Liberty Bell (1998)
- My Electricity (2000)
- Monsters (2003)
- Life's What You Make It (2003)
- You Learn About It (2003)
- Alone (2006)
- Forgotten (2006)
- Paper Waves (2015)

==== VHS ====
- In Motion (2002)

==== DVDs ====
- In Motion (2002)
- A Sound Relief (2005)
- A Noise Severe (2007)

== Collaborative releases ==
Year	Artists involved	Project	Album/song	Collaboration
2009	Danny Cavanagh	Parallel Worlds	In Parallel	vocals throughout the album
2010	Martijn Bosman	—	De Beer Die Geen Beer Was	vocals throughout the album
2012	Devin Townsend Project	—	Epicloud	lead and backing vocals on virtually every track
2014	Liv Kristine, Kari Rueslåtten	The Sirens	Sisters of the Earth, Fearless, Embracing the Seasons	vocals on Sisters of the Earth and Fearless; vocals and composition on Embracing the Seasons
2015	Arjen Anthony Lucassen	The Gentle Storm	The Diary	vocals and compositions throughout the double album
2016	Árstíðir	—	Verloren Verleden	vocals throughout the album
2016	Devin Townsend Project	—	Transcendence	backing vocals on Truth, Secret Sciences, Stars, Transcendence, Offer Your Light, Gump and Loud
2018	Residentie Orkest The Hague	—	Symphonized	vocals and curation of the repertoire on a live orchestral album spanning her entire career
2019	Devin Townsend	—	Empath	vocals on Hear Me, Singularity and King
2021	Devin Townsend	—	The Puzzle	vocals on Light Year Whale
2022	Devin Townsend	—	Lightwork	vocals on Starchasm Pt. 2
2026	Devin Townsend	—	The Moth	vocals on War Beyond Words, Covered by Causes, A Proxy for God, The Mothers, Orion, Prepare for War, The Big Snit and Stained Hearts

== Guest appearances ==
Anneke has made numerous guest appearances on recordings by artists from a variety of musical genres.

I love recording and performing with other artists. Collaborations create new energy and creative output. I enjoy the freshness it brings, which inspires me as a solo artist in my own work.
Anneke to Metal Imperium, 2012.

Year	Artist	Album	Collaboration
1992	The Mess	King Moron (soundtrack)	vocals on A Long Way
1993	Duo Bad Breath	Duo Bad Breath	vocals on all tracks
1996	Farmer Boys	Countrified	vocals on Never Let Me Down Again
1998	Ayreon	Into the Electric Castle	vocals and lyrics for the Egyptian character on Isis and Osiris, The Decision Tree (We're Alive), Tunnel of Light, The Garden of Emotions, Valley of the Queens and Another Time, Another Space
2003	Lawn	Backspace	vocals on Fix
2006	Drive By Wire	Drive By Wire	vocals on Happiness is Dangerous, Tullamore Dew and Windswept
2006	Wetton/Downes	ICON II: Rubicon	vocals on To Catch a Thief and Tears of Joy
2006	Globus	Epicon	vocals and composition on Mighty Rivers Run, vocals on Diem Ex Dei and backing vocals on Orchard of Mine
2006	Napalm Death	Smear Campaign	vocals on Weltschmerz and In Deference
2007	Merry Pierce	The Warm Aquarium	vocals on Audrey's Dance
2007	Joris Dirks	Because of the Sadness	vocals on Old Lies and Unbearable
2008	Ayreon	01011001	vocals and composition of vocal melodies for the Forever "Heart" character on Age of Shadows (We Are Forever), Comatose, Beneath the Waves, The Fifth Extinction, Waking Dreams and The Sixth Extinction
2008	Ticket for Tibet	Als Je Ooit Nog Eens Terug Kan	vocals on Als Je Ooit Nog Eens Terug Kan
2008	Moonspell	Night Eternal	vocals on Scorpion Flower
2008	Within Temptation	Black Symphony	vocals on Somewhere
2009	Giant Squid	The Ichthyologist	vocals on Sevengill
2009	Within Temptation	An Acoustic Night at the Theatre	vocals on Somewhere
2009	Devin Townsend Project	Addicted	lead and backing vocals on all songs
2009	Kan Door Huid Heen (film)	soundtrack	vocals on Dust and Holes
2010	Shane Shu	Push Me to the Ground	vocals on Push Me to the Ground (acoustic)
2010	Maiden uniteD	Mind the Acoustic Pieces	vocals on To Tame a Land and Sun and Steel
2010	Wie	Wie	vocals on Waar Gaan We Heen
2011	John Wetton	Raised in Captivity	vocals on Mighty Rivers
2011	Novembers Doom	Aphotic	vocals on What Could Have Been
2011	Globus	Break From This World	vocals on The Promise
2011	Anathema	Falling Deeper	vocals on Everwake and Alone
2011	Lorrainville	You May Never Know What Happiness Is	lead and backing vocals on all songs
2011	Devin Townsend Project	By a Thread – Live in London	lead and backing vocals on all songs
2011	Marcel Verbeek	Days to Come	vocals on Little Man
2011	DWDD Recordings	De Wereld Draait Door Recordings	vocals on All I Want is You
2011	Henry Saiz	Balance 019	vocals on Come Wander With Me
2012	Devin Townsend Project	Epicloud	lead and backing vocals on all songs
2012	DJ Hidden & Anneke van Giersbergen	Lights Off: Only You Can See	vocals on Only You Can See
2012	Pale Forest	Second Hand Balloons	vocals on Mandrake Makes a Hypnotic Gesture and Envy
2012	Lorrainville	Some December Evening	lead and backing vocals
2012	The Human Experimente	The Human Experimente	vocals on 21st Century Schizoid Man
2012	Poetracks	Poetracks	vocals on Nu Nog
2013	Devin Townsend Project	The Retinal Circus	lead and backing vocals
2013	&Me (film)	soundtrack	vocals and composition of Please Baby Don't
2013	Tronik	I'm So Real	vocals on I'm So Real
2013	For Many Reasons	Make Your Own	vocals on Funeral
2013	Niels Geusebroek	Lines	backing vocals on Falling Down and Helping Hand
2014	Devin Townsend Project	Z²	lead vocals on disc Sky Blue and backing vocals on disc Dark Matters
2014	Cellarscape	The Act of Letting Go	vocals on The Same Place
2014	The Power of Love	The Power of Love	vocals on The Power of Love
2014	Lorrainville	Desire the Reckless	lead and backing vocals
2015	Amadeus Awad	Death is Just a Feeling	vocals on Opia, Sleep Paralysis and Lonesome Clown
2015	Apenstreken (film)	soundtrack	vocals on all songs
2016	Ayreon	The Theatre Equation	vocals on various songs
2016	Devin Townsend Project	Transcendence	backing vocals
2016	Peter Slager	Silk	lead and backing vocals on various songs
2017	Ayreon	Ayreon Universe Experience	vocals on Waking Dreams, Valley of the Queens, Magnetism and The Eye of Ra
2017	BLØF	Aan	lead and backing vocals on various songs
2017	For All We Know	Take Me Home	vocals on We Are the Light
2017	Topartiesten	De Liedjeskast	vocals on De Woordsoorten
2017	Rauno Pella Project	Lullaby	vocals on Lullaby
2017	The Fading	A Moment of Insight	vocals on A Moment of Insight
2017	Grzegorz Olejnik	Another Day	vocals on Another Day
2017	Daniel Cavanagh	Monochrome	vocals on This Time, Soho and Oceans of Time
2017	BLØF	Aan Live Op CAS 2017	vocals on Hierheen and Porselein
2018	Lux Terminus	The Courage to Be	vocals on Epilogue: Fly (IV)
2018	Henry Saiz & Band	Human	vocals on Darvulia (Europe)
2018	Amorphis	Queen of Time	vocals on Amongst Stars
2018	Ayreon	Ayreon Universe	vocals on Waking Dreams, Valley of the Queens, Magnetism and The Eye of Ra
2019	Timo Tolkki's Avalon	Return to Eden	vocals on Hear Me Call and We Are the Ones
2019	Koen Herfst	LEO	vocals on July 20, 1984, Dream Away, Bereaved and All We Have is Now
2019	Devin Townsend	Empath	vocals on Hear Me, Here Comes the Sun and King
2019	Scarlean	Soulmates	vocals on Wonderful Life
2019	Vomitron	Vomitron 2	vocals on Cry Little Sister
2020	Blue Flamingo	My Kandyan Shirt	vocals on My Kandyan Shirt
2020	Ayreon	Electric Castle Live and Other Tales	vocals on Isis and Osiris, Tunnel of Light, The Garden of Emotions, Valley of the Queens, Another Time, Another Space, Shores of India and Songs of the Ocean
2020	Devin Townsend	Quarantine Project	vocals on We Like to Party (Vengaboys cover)
2020	Votum	Duhkha	vocals on Prey
2020	The Gathering Gloom	The Quarantimes	vocals on Masquerade
2020	Enlai & Kara Day	Constellations	vocals on Constellations
2020	Celestial Burst	The Maze	vocals on The Maze
2021	Esa Holopainen	Silver Lake	vocals on Fading Moon
2021	Fizzy Beard	Goddesses Among Us	vocals on Wolves Remain the Same
2021	FB1964	Dreams and Nightmares	vocals on Blood-Red Sky
2021	Libra	It Doesn't Matter Two (single)	vocals (Depeche Mode cover)
2021	John Holden and Friends	Together Apart	vocals on Northern Lights
2021	Gabriel Lucas Music	The Tower	vocals on The Tower
2021	Tomas Bergsten's Fantasy	What the Future Will Bring	vocals on What the Future Will Bring
2022	Docker's Guild	The Mystic Technocracy – Season 2: The Age of Entropy	vocals on Cassilda's Song, Urbs Aeterna and The Head
2022	Globus	Cinematica	vocals on Recover
2022	Ritual	Enigma	vocals on Pandemonium
2022	Division:Dark	Prophecy	vocals on Wrong
2025	Roswell Six	Terra Incognita: Uncharted Shores	vocals on A Sense of Wonder and The Key to Creation
2025	Cabrio	Blueprint of God	vocals on Drowning in My Own Fears
2026	Devin Townsend	The Moth	vocals on War Beyond Words, Covered by Causes, A Proxy for God, The Mothers, Orion, Prepare for War, The Big Snit and Stained Hearts
2026	Isproject	What Remains of Us	vocals on A Thousand Decades Without Me

=== DVDs and Blu-rays ===
Year	Artists	Title	Collaboration
2002	Nightwish	End of Innocence (documentary)	brief appearance and mention
2008	Within Temptation	Black Symphony	vocals on Somewhere
2011	Devin Townsend Project	By a Thread – Live in London 2011	vocals on various songs
2013	Devin Townsend Project	The Retinal Circus	vocals on various songs
2016	Ayreon	The Theatre Equation	vocals in the role of the "Fear" character on various songs from the album The Human Equation
2018	Ayreon	Ayreon Universe – Best of Ayreon Live	vocals on Waking Dreams, Valley of the Queens, Magnetism and The Eye of Ra; recorded in September 2017 at the 013 venue in Tilburg, Netherlands
2020	Ayreon	Electric Castle Live and Other Tales	vocals in the role of the "Egyptian" character on Isis and Osiris, Tunnel of Light, The Garden of Emotions, Valley of the Queens, Another Time, Another Space, Shores of India and Songs of the Ocean; recorded in September 2019 at the 013 venue in Tilburg, Netherlands
2024	Ayreon	01011001 – Live Beneath the Waves	vocals in the role of the Forever "Heart" character on various songs from the album 01011001; recorded in September 2023 at the 013 venue in Tilburg, Netherlands; released on 17 May 2024

=== Music videos (guest appearances) ===
Year	Artists	Song
2006	Lawn	Fix
2008	Ticket for Tibet	Als Je Ooit Nog Eens Terug Kan
2008	Moonspell	Scorpion Flower
2008	Within Temptation	Come Wander with Me (Agua de Annique)
2009	Agua de Annique	Hey Okay!
2009	Agua de Annique	Wonder
2010	Shane Shu	Can You Help Me
2011	Anneke van Giersbergen	Feel Alive
2012	Anneke van Giersbergen	Take Me Home
2013	&Me (film)	Please Baby Don't
2013	Anneke van Giersbergen	My Mother Said
2014	The Power of Love	The Power of Love
2018	Amorphis	Amongst Stars
2018	Anneke van Giersbergen	Zo Lief (from Symphonized)
2020	Anneke van Giersbergen	My Promise
2021	Anneke van Giersbergen	Hurricane
2021	Anneke van Giersbergen	I Saw a Car
2025	Anneke van Giersbergen	When I Die (from EP La Vie)
2026	Anneke van Giersbergen	Red Sky (from EP La Mort)
