= Shane Shu =

- Born: Shane Berend van Lunteren; February 11, 1976 (age 50)
- Origin: Kamloops, British Columbia, Canada
- Genres: Pop, hip hop, R&B
- Occupations: Singer-songwriter, songwriter, producer
- Instruments: Vocals, piano, guitar, harmonica
- Years active: 2008–present
- Labels: Virgin EMI Records, Beluga Heights
- Website: http://iamshaneshu.com/

Shane Shu (Shane Berend van Lunteren, born February 11, 1976) is a Dutch/Canadian singer-songwriter, Record producer and photographer from Kamloops, British Columbia. He is best known as a solo artist though he has an independent career as a songwriter and producer for various artists and record labels. Shane has made vocal contributions to the albums of Nobody Beats The Drum, Don Diablo, Anneke van Giersbergen, and artist photography for Lucky Fonz III, Beans & Fatback, Kris Berry, Steffen Morrison, Alfred Brendel, Jorge Luis Prats, Severin von Eckardstein, Lang Lang, Enrico Pace, and Arcadi Volodos. His mezzo-soprano voice has been compared to David Bowie, David Byrne and Robert Plant and his dress sense has been compared to Prince.

Shu's self-titled debut album was released in 2008. "The Way She Talks To Me" was widely played on MTV Europe. The music video was directed by MVPA Director of the Year Yoann Lemoine.

The single "Push Me to the Ground" from his second album Let's Burn This Town 2010 was well received and got "tons of airplay". Dutch Radio 3FM named him "Serious Talent". The acoustic version, a duet with Anneke van Giersbergen performed live on Giel Beelen's 3FM radio show created a small internet hype.

He is based in Los Angeles and professionally represented by Beluga Heights and Sony/ATV Music Publishing.
