= Superheat (album) =

Live album by The Gathering
- Released: 25 January 2000
- Recorded: Paradiso (Amsterdam) on 16 April 1999, except "Rescue Me" and "Strange Machines", recorded at 013 (Tilburg) on 28 February 1999.
- Genre: Alternative rock, progressive rock
- Length: 65:41
- Label: Century Media
- Producer: The Gathering

The Gathering chronology
How to Measure a Planet? (1999)	Superheat (2000)	If Then Else (2000)

Professional ratings
Review scores
Source	Rating
AllMusic	4/5 stars
Kerrang!	3/5 stars

Superheat is a live album by Dutch alternative rock band The Gathering, released on 25 January 2000 by Century Media Records. The album was recorded at Paradiso, Amsterdam, Netherlands on 16 April 1999, with the exception of "Rescue Me" & "Strange Machines", which were recorded at 013, Tilburg, Netherlands on 28 February 1999.

The album was produced by The Gathering, recorded and engineered by Jan Schuurman at 'The Van' Mobile Studio. The album was mixed by Jan Schuurman Raymond Tabak & The Gathering at 'The Van' Home Studio, Spakenburg, Netherlands during the Summer of 1999. The album was mastered by Paul Schuurman on 1 October 1999 at 'The Van' Home Studio.

In refrigeration, superheat is the amount of heat added to the refrigerant after it has changed from liquid state into a vapor state.

== Track listing ==
Original 2000 Release
No.	Title	Length
1.	"The Big Sleep"	5:26
2.	"On Most Surfaces (Inüit)"	6:45
3.	"Probably Built in the Fifties"	6:52
4.	"Liberty Bell"	5:27
5.	"Marooned"	5:47
6.	"Rescue Me"	6:59
7.	"Strange Machines"	6:26
8.	"Nighttime Birds"	6:51
9.	"My Electricity"	3:29
10.	"Sand & Mercury"	11:38

CD-ROM bonus track
No.	Title	Length
11.	"Eléanor"	7:33

== Personnel ==
- Anneke van Giersbergen – lead vocals, guitars
- René Rutten – guitars
- Frank Boeijen – keyboards
- Hugo Prinsen Geerligs – bass
- Hans Rutten – drums
