= Yoav Goren =

Israeli-American composer

Yoav Goren (Hebrew: יואב גורן) is an Israeli-American musician, composer, and record producer specializing in soundtracks and trailer music for films and television series. He was one of the founders of Immediate Music, 1 Revolution Music, and Imperativa Records.

Born in Israel, Goren was raised in New York City by an artistic family that encouraged him to study piano at a young age. He was influenced initially by classical composers, then by the Beatles and by film composers Ennio Morricone, Jerry Goldsmith, and John Barry. He began composing while studying at New York University, where he graduated with a degree in Film & Television Production.

After touring with several bands in the US as a keyboardist, Goren settled in Los Angeles, California, where he met and collaborated with Leonard Cohen on the critically acclaimed album The Future (1992) as arranger and co-producer.

In 1993, Goren co-founded Immediate Music with fellow composer Jeffrey Fayman. From his first trailer score for Carlito’s Way in 1993 to campaigns for films such as Star Wars, Captain Marvel, Wonder Woman, Avengers, X-Men, Amazing Spider-Man, and the complete Harry Potter series, Goren and Immediate Music have provided music to motion picture studios through both custom scoring and the Immediate Music production music library. With over 6,000 trailer score placements to date, the team of Goren and Fayman are among the world's most frequently utilized composers in the motion picture advertising industry. Building upon the success of Immediate Music, Goren collaborated again with Fayman in 2010 to co-found the company 1 Revolution Music, which produced a production music catalog for licensed use in television programming and other media. Both Immediate Music and 1 Revolution Music were acquired by BMG Rights Management in 2017.

In 2006 Goren launched Imperativa Records, a commercial record label specializing in the music genre known as Epic Music. Notable artists and releases include Globus Music and the Trailerhead series.

Goren received an Emmy Award in 2007 for ‘Outstanding Music Composition in a Sports Program’, and a BMI Award in 2008, for his contribution to "The XX Olympic Winter Games: The Stories of Torino" during NBC's XX Olympic Winter Games broadcast. Goren was also tapped by Telemundo Deportes to compose the official theme song of Telemundo's 2018 FIFA WORLD CUP™ BROADCAST.
