= Everything Is Changing =

Studio album by Anneke van Giersbergen
- Released: 20 January 2012
- Recorded: 2011
- Genre: Alternative rock, pop rock
- Length: 45:00
- Label: Agua Recordings

Anneke van Giersbergen chronology
In Your Room (2009)	Everything Is Changing (2012)	Drive (2013)

Everything Is Changing is the debut studio album by the former The Gathering and Agua de Annique vocalist Anneke van Giersbergen.

== Track list ==
All tracks are written by Daniel Cardoso and Anneke van Giersbergen, except where noted

No.	Title	Length
1.	"Feel Alive"	3:37
2.	"You Want to Be Free"	3:23
3.	"Everything Is Changing"	3:18
4.	"Take Me Home"	3:23
5.	"I Wake Up"	3:29
6.	"Circles" (René Merkelbach, van Giersbergen)	4:00
7.	"My Boy"	4:15
8.	"Stay"	4:08
9.	"Hope, Pray, Dance, Play" (Merkelbach, van Giersbergen)	3:19
10.	"Slow Me Down"	2:57
11.	"Too Late"	4:11
12.	"1000 Miles Away from You"	4:59
Total length:		45:00

== Credits ==
- Anneke van Giersbergen - vocals, guitar, keyboards, piano, acoustic guitar
- Daniel Cardoso - vocals, piano, guitars, bass
- Rob Snijders - drums
- Dennis Leeflang - drums (tracks 5, 9, 11)
- Ruud Jolie - guitars (tracks 1, 2, 4, 7, 12)
- Ferry Duijsens - guitars (track 9)
- Joost van Haaren - bass (track 2)
- René Markelbach - keyboards (track 9), grand piano (track 6)
- Camilla van der Kooij - violins (track 6)
