= Nighttime Birds =

Studio album by The Gathering
- Released: 6 June 1997
- Recorded: 17 February – 15 March 1997
- Studio: Woodhouse Studios, Hagen, Germany
- Genre: Progressive metal; gothic metal
- Length: 48:44
- Label: Century Media
- Producer: Siggi Bemm, The Gathering

The Gathering chronology
Mandylion (1995)	Nighttime Birds (1997)	How to Measure a Planet? (1998)

Professional ratings
Review scores
Source	Rating
AllMusic	4.5/5 stars
Chronicles of Chaos	9/10 8/10
Collector's Guide to Heavy Metal	9/10
Rock Hard	9.5/10

Nighttime Birds is the fourth full-length album of the Dutch rock band The Gathering, released on 6 June 1997 by Century Media Records. The album was recorded at Woodhouse Studios, Hagen, Germany, between 17 February and 15 March 1997 under the guidance of producer Siggi Bemm. Unlike their previous album, Nighttime Birds is much more experimental, atmospheric and melodic.

== Track listing ==
All lyrics are written by Anneke van Giersbergen; all music is composed by The Gathering, except where noted otherwise.

Original 1997 Release
No.	Title	Length
1.	"On Most Surfaces (Inuït)"	6:55
2.	"Confusion"	6:33
3.	"The May Song"	3:45
4.	"The Earth Is My Witness"	5:31
5.	"New Moon, Different Day"	6:07
6.	"Third Chance"	5:26
7.	"Kevin's Telescope"	3:23
8.	"Nighttime Birds"	7:00
9.	"Shrink"	4:00

Japanese edition bonus tracks
No.	Title	Length
10.	"Leaves" (live)	6:55
11.	"Eléanor" (live)	6:34

2007 Century Media Reissue Disc 1 bonus tracks
No.	Title	Length
10.	"The May Song" (radio edit)	3:50
11.	"The Earth Is My Witness" (edit)	4:14
12.	"Confusion" (live)	7:08
13.	"The May Song" (live)	3:32
14.	"New Moon, Different Day" (live)	6:03
15.	"Adrenaline" (live)	4:06

Tracks 10–11 taken from The May Song EP.
Tracks 12–15 taken from the In Motion DVD. Recorded live in Krakow, Poland, 1997

2007 Century Media Reissue Disc 2 bonus tracks
No.	Title	Length
1.	"New Moon, Different Day" (demo/EROC sessions)	6:18
2.	"Kevin's Telescope" (instrumental demo/EROC sessions)	4:47
3.	"Shrink" (demo/EROC sessions)	3:59
4.	"The Earth Is My Witness" (demo/EROC sessions)	6:09
5.	"Diamond Box" (Instrumental demo/EROC sessions)	4:41
6.	"Nighttime Birds" (demo/EROC sessions)	7:02
7.	"On Most Surfaces" (demo/EROC sessions)	7:30
8.	"Hjelmar's" (instrumental demo/EROC sessions)	1:35
9.	"In Power We Entrust the Love Advocated" (Dead Can Dance cover, written by Lisa Gerrard, Brendan Perry)	4:05
10.	"When the Sun Hits" (Slowdive cover, written by Neil Halstead)	4:52
11.	"Confusion" (EROC remix)	7:16
12.	"Shrink" (alternate version)	2:14
13.	"Adrenaline"	4:15
14.	"Third Chance" (alternate version)	5:37

Tracks 1–8: EROC demo sessions recorded at Woodhouse Studios, Hagen, Germany, mixed by EROC, 15 to 30 November 1996.
Tracks 9–10 recorded at S&K Studios, Doetinchem, Netherlands, 1 to 4 September 1997. Taken from the Kevin's Telescope EP, produced by The Gathering & Dirk Kemper.
Track 11 taken from the Kevin's Telescope EP, remixed by EROC.
Track 12 recorded at Patrick Steenbakkers Audioprodukties, Shijndel, Netherlands, Summer 1996. Taken from the Liberty Bell EP, produced by Patrick Steenbakkers & The Gathering.
Tracks 13–14 recorded at RS 29 Studios, Wolluck, Netherlands, 30 March to 3 April 1996. Taken from the Adrenaline / Leaves EP, produced, engineered and mixed by Oscar Holleman & The Gathering.

== Trivia ==
- In the song "Nighttime Birds" (after minute 3:45) there is a sample of Indian flute music (a Raga Kafi) which can be heard in the Dutch theme park Efteling at the fairy tale of The Flying Fakir.
- The song "Nighttime Birds" contains a quote from the film Willy Wonka & the Chocolate Factory.

== Personnel ==
The Gathering

- Anneke van Giersbergen – lead vocals
- René Rutten – guitars, flute
- Jelmer Wiersma – guitars
- Frank Boeijen – synthesizers, grand piano
- Hugo Prinsen Geerligs – bass
- Hans Rutten – drums

Production

- Siggi Bemm – producer, engineer, mixing
- Matthias Klinkmann – engineer

== Charts ==
Chart (1997)	Peak position
Dutch Albums Chart	12
Finnish Albums Chart	32
German Albums Chart	80

== Certifications ==
Certifications for Nighttime Birds
Region	Certification	Certified units/sales
Netherlands (NVPI)	Gold	18,600^{‡}
^{‡} Sales+streaming figures based on certification alone.
