= In Your Room (Agua de Annique album) =

Studio album by Agua de Annique
- Released: 30 October 2009
- Label: Agua Recordings

Agua de Annique chronology
Pure Air (2009)	In Your Room (2009)	Everything Is Changing (2012)

In Your Room is the third studio album by Agua de Annique, formed by the former Gathering vocalist Anneke van Giersbergen. It was released on 30 October 2009.

== Track list ==
1. "Pearly"
2. "Hey Okay!"
3. "I Want"
4. "Wonder"
5. "The World"
6. "Sunny Side Up"
7. "Physical"
8. "Home Again"
9. "Wide Open"
10. "Longest Day"
11. "Just Fine" (co-written by Devin Townsend)
12. "Adore" (written by Jacques de Haard and Cyril Crutz)

All songs written by Anneke van Giersbergen except where noted

== Personnel ==
- Anneke van Giersbergen – Vocals, keys, guitar
- Joris Dirks – guitar, vocals
- Jacques de Haard – Bass guitar
- Rob Snijders – Drums
