= Sleepy Buildings – A Semi Acoustic Evening =

Live album by The Gathering
- Released: 26 January 2004
- Recorded: 21–22 August 2003 at the
- Venues: Lux Theatre, Nijmegen, The Netherlands
- Genres: Alternative rock, progressive rock
- Length: 72:39
- Label: Century Media Records
- Producer: The Gathering

The Gathering chronology
| Souvenirs (2003) | Sleepy Buildings – A Semi Acoustic Evening (2004) | Home (2006) |

Professional ratings
Review scores
| Source | Rating |
|---|---|
| AllMusic | 4/5 stars |
| Chronicles of Chaos | 9/10 |
| Scream Magazine | 2/6 stars |

Sleepy Buildings – A Semi Acoustic Evening is a live album by the Dutch rock band The Gathering, released in Europe on 26 January 2004 and in the United States on 9 March 2004 by Century Media Records. The album was recorded at The LUX Theatre in Nijmegen, Netherlands on 22 August 2003. Produced, performed and arranged by The Gathering, it was recorded and engineered by Jan Schuurman at 'The Van' Mobile Studio. The album was mixed by Jan Schuurman, assisted by Wouter Nagtegaal, René Rutten and Frank Boeijen and mastered by Paul Schuurman at 'The Van' Mastering Studio.

== Track listing ==
Original 2004 release
| No. | Title | Lyrics | Music | Length |
|---|---|---|---|---|
| 1. | "Locked Away" | Anneke van Giersbergen | The Gathering | 3:36 |
| 2. | "Saturnine" | Anneke van Giersbergen | The Gathering | 4:54 |
| 3. | "Amity" | Anneke van Giersbergen | The Gathering | 5:52 |
| 4. | "The Mirror Waters" (v.2003) | Bart Smits | Bart Smits, René Rutten, Jelmer Wiersma, Frank Boeijen, Hugo Prinsen Geerligs, Hans Rutten | 6:41 |
| 5. | "Red Is a Slow Colour" | Anneke van Giersbergen | The Gathering | 5:39 |
| 6. | "Sleepy Buildings" | Anneke van Giersbergen | The Gathering | 2:55 |
| 7. | "Travel" | Anneke van Giersbergen | The Gathering | 9:08 |
| 8. | "Shrink" | Anneke van Giersbergen | Anneke van Giersbergen, René Rutten, Jelmer Wiersma, Frank Boeijen, Hugo Prinsen Geerligs, Hans Rutten | 2:58 |
| 9. | "In Motion #2" | Anneke van Giersbergen | Anneke van Giersbergen, René Rutten, Jelmer Wiersma, Frank Boeijen, Hugo Prinsen Geerligs, Hans Rutten | 4:29 |
| 10. | "Stonegarden" (v.2003) | Bart Smits | Bart Smits, René Rutten, Jelmer Wiersma, Frank Boeijen, Hugo Prinsen Geerligs, Hans Rutten | 5:11 |
| 11. | "My Electricity" | Anneke van Giersbergen | The Gathering | 3:23 |
| 12. | "Eléanor" | Anneke van Giersbergen | Anneke van Giersbergen, René Rutten, Jelmer Wiersma, Frank Boeijen, Hugo Prinsen Geerligs, Hans Rutten | 5:32 |
| 13. | "Marooned" | Anneke van Giersbergen | The Gathering | 5:31 |
| 14. | "Like Fountains" (v.2003) | Niels Duffhues & Anneke van Giersbergen | René Rutten, Jelmer Wiersma, Frank Boeijen, Hugo Prinsen Geerligs, Hans Rutten | 6:45 |

== Credits ==
- Anneke van Giersbergen – vocals & acoustic guitar
- René Rutten – guitars
- Hugo Prinsen Geerligs – bass
- Frank Boeijen – keyboards & piano
- Hans Rutten – drums
