= Drive (Anneke van Giersbergen album) =

Studio album by Anneke van Giersbergen
- Released: 23 September 2013
- Recorded: 2013
- Genre: Alternative rock, pop rock
- Length: 37:28
- Label: Inside Out Music
- Producer: Arno Krabman

Anneke van Giersbergen chronology
Everything Is Changing (2012)	Drive (2013)	The Darkest Skies Are the Brightest (2021)

Singles from Drive
- 1. "Drive" Released: 23 August 2013

Drive is the second studio album by Anneke van Giersbergen, released in the Benelux Union on 23 September 2013 and internationally on 15 October.

Professional ratings
Review scores
Source	Rating
Bring the Noise UK	9/10

== Track listing ==
No.	Title	Lyrics	Music	Length
1.	"We Live On"	Anneke van Giersbergen, Ferry Duijsens, Arno Krabman	Anneke van Giersbergen, Ferry Duijsens, Arno Krabman	3:41
2.	"Treat Me Like a Lady"	Giersbergen, Krabman	Giersbergen, Duijsens, Krabman	4:00
3.	"She"	Giersbergen	Daniel Gibson	3:08
4.	"Drive"	Giersbergen, Krabman	Giersbergen, Krabman	3:43
5.	"My Mother Said"	Giersbergen	Giersbergen, René Merkelbach, Krabman	3:21
6.	"Forgive Me"	Giersbergen	Giersbergen, Gibson	3:11
7.	"You Will Never Change"	Giersbergen, Krabman	Giersbergen, Duijsens, Krabman	4:03
8.	"Mental Jungle"	Giersbergen, Hayko Cepkin	Giersbergen, Duijsens	3:44
9.	"Shooting for the Stars"	Giersbergen	Giersbergen, Krabman	4:33
10.	"The Best Is Yet to Come"	Giersbergen, Krabman	Giersbergen, Gibson, Krabman	4:04
Total length:				37:28

== Personnel ==
Anneke van Giersbergen

- Anneke van Giersbergen – vocals
- Arno Krabman – guitars, keyboards
- Ferry Duijsens – guitars, keyboards
- Gijs Coolen – guitars
- Joost van Haaren – bass
- Rob Snijders – drums

Additional personnel

- Hayko Cepkin – vocals on "Mental Jungle"
- Annelies Kuijsters – backing vocals
- Niels Geusebroek – backing vocals
- Susanne Clermonts – backing vocals
- René Merkelbach – piano on "My Mother Said"
- Silvana Jirka – violin on "Mental Jungle"
