= Mandylion (album) =

Studio album by The Gathering
- Released: 22 August 1995
- Recorded: 1–16 June 1995
- Studio: Woodhouse Studios, Hagen, Germany
- Genre: Gothic metal; progressive metal
- Length: 52:40
- Label: Century Media
- Producer: Siggi Bemm, Waldemar Sorychta and The Gathering

The Gathering chronology
Almost a Dance (1993)	Mandylion (1995)	Nighttime Birds (1997)

Professional ratings
Review scores
Source	Rating
AllMusic	3/5 stars
Chronicles of Chaos	8/10
Collector's Guide to Heavy Metal	8/10
Rock Hard	9.0/10
PopMatters	9/10
Sputnikmusic	3.5/5

Mandylion is the third studio album by the Dutch band the Gathering. It was released on 22 August 1995 by Century Media Records. The record is their first album to feature vocalist Anneke van Giersbergen. The album was recorded and mixed at Woodhouse Studios in Hagen, Germany between 1 and 16 June 1995, under the guidance of Siggi Bemm and Waldemar Sorychta.

== Background ==
The Gathering was signed to Century Media Records from 1995 to 2001. This era is widely considered the band's most commercially successful and influential period, marking their transition from death-doom metal to atmospheric rock and trip hop.

Mandylion was their breakthrough album and their first to chart in the Netherlands, featuring music videos and the hits "Strange Machines" and "Leaves". Additionally, is one of the first albums of the gothic metal genre to focus on female vocals, replacing the harsh male death growls.

== Musical style ==
This album is a radical change from the dark content of doom metal of The Gathering's first two albums, towards a more melodic sound that explores themes of nature, emotion and mysticism. All the lyrics were written by the new singer at the time, Anneke van Giersbergen, to whom the band would give total creative freedom from then on. Instrumentally, the sound is built on slow-to-midtempo, heavy "doomy" guitar riffs intertwined with "omniscient layers" of atmospheric synthesizers, with complex song structures and long tracks.

Two of the songs have quotes from popular culture inserted into them: "Strange Machines" contains a passage from George Pal's film version of H. G. Wells's The Time Machine, and "Sand & Mercury" ends with a recording of J. R. R. Tolkien reading a quote from Simone de Beauvoir.

== Track listing ==
All lyrics are written by Anneke van Giersbergen; all music is composed by The Gathering.

No.	Title	Length
1.	"Strange Machines"	6:04
2.	"Eléanor"	6:42
3.	"In Motion #1"	6:56
4.	"Leaves"	6:01
5.	"Fear the Sea"	5:50
6.	"Mandylion" (instrumental)	5:02
7.	"Sand & Mercury"	9:57
8.	"In Motion #2"	6:08

Japanese edition bonus tracks
No.	Title	Length
9.	"Adrenaline"	4:16
10.	"Third Chance"	5:37

Disc 2 – 2005 Century Media Reissue
No.	Title	Length
1.	"In Motion #1 (Demo)"	7:28
2.	"Mandylion (Demo)" (instrumental)	4:42
3.	"Solar Glider (Demo)" (instrumental)	4:35
4.	"Eléanor (Demo)"	6:38
5.	"In Motion #2 (Demo)"	7:18
6.	"Third Chance (Demo)"	5:53
7.	"Fear the Sea (Demo)"	6:28

Disc 2, 1–3 demo recorded in June 1994 at Beaufort Studio.
Disc 2, 4–7 demo recorded in early 1995 at Double Noise Studio in Tilburg.

== Personnel ==
The Gathering

- Anneke van Giersbergen – lead vocals
- René Rutten – guitars, flute
- Jelmer Wiersma – guitars
- Frank Boeijen – keyboards
- Hugo Prinsen Geerligs – bass
- Hans Rutten – drums

Production

- Siggi Bemm, Waldemar Sorychta – producers, engineers, mixing

== Charts ==
=== Weekly charts ===
Chart (1995–96)	Peak position
Dutch Albums (Album Top 100)	20

=== Year-end charts ===
Chart (1996)	Position
Dutch Albums (Album Top 100)	99

== Certifications ==
Certifications for Mandylion
Region	Certification	Certified units/sales
Netherlands (NVPI)	Gold	18,600^{‡}
^{‡} Sales+streaming figures based on certification alone.
