= List of Dutch singers =

This is a list of singers from the Netherlands.

== List ==
=== 0-9 ===
- 4 AM
- 4 Fun

=== A ===
- Aafje Heynis
- Aaltje Noordewier-Reddingius
- Albert West
- Allan Eshuijs
- Amber
- Amira Willighagen
- André Hazes
- André Manuel
- André van Duin
- Andy Tielman
- Angela Groothuizen
- Anita Doth
- Anita Meyer
- Ann Burton
- Anneke Grönloh
- Anneke van Giersbergen
- Anneliese van der Pol
- Annemarie Kremer
- Annie Palmen
- Anny Schilder
- Anouchka van Miltenburg
- Anouk
- Anton Sistermans
- Anton van Rooy
- Antonie Kamerling
- Arjen Anthony Lucassen
- Armand
- Arno Menses
- Arnold van Mill

=== B ===
- Barry Hay
- Bart Smits
- Bas Ramselaar
- Bastiaan Ragas
- Bearforce 1
- Ben Cramer
- Ben Janssen
- Ben Saunders
- Benny Neyman
- Bernadette
- Bert van t'Hoff
- Bertha Frensel Wegener
- Bertolf Lentink
- Bill van Dijk
- Birgit Schuurman
- Blaudzun
- Bojoura
- Bonnie St. Claire
- Boris Titulaer
- Boudewijn de Groot

=== C ===
- CB Milton
- Cab Kaye
- Candy Dulfer
- Carice van Houten
- Carina Lemoine
- Caro Emerald
- Carola Smit
- Caroline Stam
- Caught in the Act
- Cees Veerman
- Celine Cairo
- Centerfold
- Chantal Janzen
- Charlie Dée
- Charlotte Margiono
- Charlotte Wessels
- Christel Adelaar
- Close II You
- Co Verdaas
- Coen van Vrijberghe de Coningh
- Conny Stuart
- Conny Vandenbos
- Cornelis Bronsgeest
- Cornelis Vreeswijk
- Cornélie van Zanten
- Corry Brokken
- Cristina Deutekom

=== D ===
- Daisy Dee
- Daniël Sahuleka
- Danny de Munk
- Dave
- David Alexandre Winter
- De Buddy's
- Dean Saunders
- Debbie
- Denise Jannah
- Devriès family
- Diana van Berlo
- Dianne van Giersbergen
- Dick Annegarn
- Dick Rienstra
- Dinand Woesthoff
- Do
- Dolf Brouwers
- Dolly Dots
- Dorona Alberti
- Dotan Harpenau
- Douwe Bob
- Driekes Hoekstra
- Dries Holten
- Dries Roelvink
- Drs. P
- Duncan Laurence

=== E ===
- E-Life
- Eddy Christiani
- Ede Staal
- Edsilia Rombley
- Edward Reekers
- Eef van Breen
- Eefje de Visser
- EliZe
- Ellen ten Damme
- Elly Ameling
- Els Bongers
- Emma Kok
- Emil Landman
- Eric Corton
- Erik Hulzebosch
- Erna Spoorenberg
- Esmée Denters
- Esther Hart
- Euson
- Eva Simons
- Eva-Maria Westbroek
- Ewout Genemans

=== F ===
- Floor Jansen
- Floortje Smit
- Forrest
- Francien van Tuinen
- Franciscus Henri
- Frank Boeijen
- Frans Bauer
- Frans Duijts
- Fred Wiegman
- Frederik van Pallandt
- Freek de Jonge
- Frisz
- Frizzle Sizzle

=== G ===
- G.W. Sok
- George Baker
- George Kooymans
- Georgie Davis
- Georgina Verbaan
- Gerard Cox
- Gerard Joling
- Getty Kaspers
- Glennis Grace
- Gordon Heuckeroth
- Greetje Kauffeld
- Gré Brouwenstijn
- Guus Meeuwis
- Guusje Nederhorst

=== H ===
- Haris Alagic
- Harry Muskee
- Harry van der Kamp
- Hearts of Soul
- Heddy Lester
- Heintje Simons
- Henk Poort
- Henk Westbroek
- Henk Wijngaard
- Henkie
- Henny Vrienten
- Henri Albers
- Henri Sattler
- Henri van Zanten
- Herman Brock Jr.
- Herman Brood
- Herman van Doorn
- Herman van Veen
- Hessel
- Hetty Blok
- Hilbrand Nawijn
- Hind Laroussi
- Humphrey Campbell
- Huug Kok

=== I ===
- IET
- Ilse DeLange
- Ilse Huizinga
- Imran Khan
- Irene Jansen
- Irene Moors
- Iris Kroes
- Izaline Calister

=== J ===
- Jaap Reesema
- Jack Jersey
- Jack Poels
- Jacqueline Govaert
- Jacques Urlus
- Jamai Loman
- Jan Keizer
- Jan Mesdag
- Jan Rot
- Jan Smit
- Jan-Chris de Koeijer
- Janine Kitzen
- Jeannette van Zutphen
- Jelka van Houten
- Jenny Arean
- Jerney Kaagman
- Jeroen Phaff
- Jeroen van der Boom
- Jeronimo van Ballegoijen
- Jett Rebel
- Jetty Paerl
- Jim Bakkum
- Joan Franka
- Johan Messchaert
- Johannes Heesters
- Johannette Zomer
- John van Kesteren
- Johnny & Jones
- Johnny Jordaan
- Joost Prinsen
- Joost Klein
- Jordy van Loon
- Jos Brink
- Josje Huisman
- José Hoebee
- Joëlle van Noppen
- Judith Mok
- Julia Culp
- Julia van Bergen
- Justine Pelmelay

=== K ===
- K3
- Kamryn Belle
- Karin Bloemen
- Katja Schuurman
- Kenny B
- Keren Ann
- Kim Hoorweg
- Kim-Lian
- Kimm Hekker
- Kizzy

=== L ===
- Lana Wolf
- Laura Fygi
- Laura Jansen
- Laurens Bogtman
- Lee Towers
- Leigh Blond
- Lena Lootens
- Lenny Kuhr
- Leo Fuld
- Leoni Jansen
- Leonie Meijer
- Lex Goudsmit
- Lex van Delden
- Lexington Bridge
- Lia Dorana
- Liesbeth List
- Lils Mackintosh
- Linda Estelle
- Linda Wagenmakers
- Linda Williams
- Lisa Hordijk
- Liz Kay
- Loona
- Lou Bandy
- Louis Davids
- Loïs Lane
- Luv'
- Léon de Jong

=== M ===
- Maarten Cox
- Maarten Heijmans
- Maarten van Roozendaal
- Maartje Offers
- Maggie MacNeal
- Mai Tai
- MainStreet
- Maitri
- Manda Ophuis
- Manke Nelis
- Manoush
- Marcha
- Marco Borsato
- Marga Scheide
- Maria Francisca Bia
- Marian van de Wal
- Maribelle
- Marijne van der Vlugt
- Marike Groot
- Marike Jager
- Mariska Veres
- Marius van Altena
- Mark Jansen
- Mark Ritsema
- Marlayne
- Martin Porter
- Martin van Drunen
- Martine van Loon
- Mathilde Santing
- Maud Mulder
- Maurice de Jong
- Max Blokzijl
- Max Werner
- Max van Egmond
- Maya Hakvoort
- Maya Lavelle
- Maywood
- Michelle Courtens
- Miggy
- Milly Scott
- Mirjam Timmer
- Monica Verschoor
- Monique Smit

=== N ===
- Nancy Coolen
- Natalie La Rose
- Natasja Vermeer
- Nathalie Makoma
- Nick & Simon
- Nick Schilder
- Nico van der Meel
- Niels Duffhuës
- Niels Geusebroek
- Nielson
- Nightporter
- Nikki Kerkhof
- Ntjam Rosie
- Nynke Laverman

=== O ===
- O'G3NE
- Oedo Kuipers
- Olivier Heim
- Ome Henk
- Oscar Benton

=== P ===
- Passion Fruit
- Patricia Paay
- Patrick Mameli
- Patrick Tilon
- Patty Brard
- Patty Trossèl
- Paul de Leeuw
- Peter Blanker
- Peter Kooy
- Peter Van Wood
- Peter de Koning
- Phatt (Ricardo Burgrust)
- Pia Douwes
- Pierre Kartner
- Piet Muijselaar
- Piet Römer
- Piet Veerman
- Polle Eduard
- Princess Christina of the Netherlands

=== R ===
- Rachel Kramer
- Rachel Traets
- Rachèl Louise
- Raffaëla Paton
- Ralf Mackenbach
- Ramses Shaffy
- Rania Zeriri
- Ray Slijngaard
- René Froger
- René Klijn
- René Shuman
- Ria Brieffies
- Ria Thielsch
- Ria Valk
- Rijk de Gooyer
- Rita Reys
- Rob de Nijs
- Robbie van Leeuwen
- Robert Holl
- Robert Long
- Robert Westerholt
- Rochelle Perts
- Roger Peterson
- Rolinha Kross
- Romy Haag
- Ron Link
- Ronald van Prooijen
- Rood Adeo
- Rosy Pereira
- Rudi Carrell
- Ruth Jacott
- Ruud Schaap

=== S ===
- Sabine Uitslag
- Sabrina Starke
- Sander Gommans
- Sander Jan Klerk
- Sandra Reemer
- Sandra van Nieuwland
- Sanne Hans (Miss Montreal)
- Selena
- Shane Shu
- Sharon Doorson
- Sharon Kips
- Sharon Kovacs
- Sharon den Adel
- Shirley
- Sieneke
- Signe Tollefsen
- Simon Keizer
- Simone Angel
- Simone Kleinsma
- Simone Simons
- Sita
- Snoopy
- Stef Bos
- Stella Maessen
- Stevie Ann
- Suzanna Lubrano
- Svenja van Beek
- Sylvia Kristel
- Sytse Buwalda

=== T ===
- Taco
- Tamara Hoekwater
- Tania de Jong
- Tante Leen
- Tatjana Šimić
- Teddy Scholten
- Tess Gaerthé
- The Shorts
- The Star Sisters
- Thea Van Seijen
- Thijs van Leer
- Thomas Azier
- Thomas Berge
- Thé Lau
- Thérèse Steinmetz
- Tim Douwsma
- Tim Knol
- Tol Hansse
- Tom Manders
- Toon Hermans
- Treble
- Trijntje Oosterhuis
- Trudy van den Berg

=== V ===
- Valensia
- VanVelzen

=== W ===
- WOW!
- Wally Tax
- Waylon
- Wende
- Wesley Klein
- Wieteke van Dort
- Wilke te Brummelstroete
- Willeke Alberti
- Willem Duyn
- Willemijn Verkaik
- Willy Alberti
- Willy Walden
- Wilma Driessen
- Wilma Landkroon
- Wim Hogenkamp
- Wim Kan
- Wim Sonneveld
- Wim de Bie
- Wolter Kroes
- Wouter Hamel

=== X ===
- Xander
- Xander de Buisonjé

=== Y ===
- Youp van 't Hek
- Yvonne Keeley

=== Z ===
- Zangeres Zonder Naam
- Ziggi Recado

== See also ==
- Music of Netherlands
