= Hoekstra =

Hoekstra is a Frisian toponymic surname, meaning "from the corner" or "(river) bend". Notable people with the surname include:

- André Hoekstra (born 1962), Dutch footballer
- Arnout Hoekstra (born 1984), Dutch politician
- Cecil Hoekstra (1935–2018), Canadian ice hockey player
- Driekes Hoekstra (born 2000), Dutch folk singer
- Ed Hoekstra (1937–2011), Dutch-Canadian ice hockey player
- Han G. Hoekstra (1906–1988), Dutch poet
- Hannah Hoekstra (born 1987), Dutch actress
- Henk Hoekstra (1924–2009), Dutch politician
- Hopi Hoekstra (born 1972), American evolutionary biologist
- Kenn Hoekstra (born 1973), American video game designer
- Jacob Hoekstra (born 2000), American politician and professor
- Jochem Hoekstra (born 1992), Dutch cyclist
- Joel Hoekstra (born 1970), American guitarist
- Johnny Hoekstra (1917–2006), American basketball player
- Marten Hoekstra (born 1961), American businessman
- Minne Hoekstra (1884–1941), Dutch speed skater
- Paulus Hoekstra (born 1944), Belgian sprint canoer
- Pete Hoekstra (born 1953), American politician and diplomat
- Peter Hoekstra (born 1973), Dutch footballer
- Piet Hoekstra (born 1947), Dutch cyclist
- Rein Jan Hoekstra (1941–2025), Dutch jurist and politician
- Sanne Hoekstra (born 1992), Dutch handball player
- Sjoerd Hoekstra (born 1959), Dutch rower
- Tiny Hoekstra (born 1996), Dutch footballer
- Wopke Hoekstra (born 1975), Dutch politician
