= Reddingius =

Reddingius is a Dutch surname. Notable people with the surname include:

- Aaltje Noordewier-Reddingius (1868–1949), Dutch classical soprano
- Joannes Reddingius (1873–1944), Dutch poet
- Kiara Reddingius (born 1992), Australian bobsledder
- Regnerus Petrus Reddingius (1895–1957), Dutch physician and mayor
- Rutger Adolf Benthem Reddingius (1801–1863), Dutch mayor
