= Miggy =

Miggy may refer to:

== People ==
- nickname of Miguel Tayag Sta.Ana (born 2006), Filipino professional gamer
- nickname of Miguel Almirón (born 1994), Paraguayan professional footballer
- nickname of Miguel Andújar (born 1995), Dominican Republic professional baseball player
- nickname of Margherita Miggy Biller, British mathematics teacher
- nickname of Miguel Cabrera (born 1983), Venezuelan professional baseball player
- nickname of Miguel Montero (born 1983), Venezuelan former professional baseball player
- Miggy Cancel, a contestant on the reality TV series The Biggest Loser (season 9)
- Miggy Chavez, a member of the Filipino rock band Chicosci
- Miggy Littleton, a member of the American indie rock band Blood on the Wall
- Miggy (singer), Dutch pop singer Marina van der Rijk (1961–2012)

== Other uses ==
- Miggy, a character in the British comic strip The Gambols
- nickname for the Amiga computer

== See also ==
- Paul Migy (1814–1879), Swiss politician
