= Alice Maywood =

Alice May
- Also known as: Alice Maywood
- Born: December 20, 1954 (age 70)
- Occupation: Singer-songwriter
- Formerly of: Maywood (band)
- Spouse(s): Rob van Wijk, m. 1996

Alice May (or Aaltje de Vries, born 20 December 1954) is a Dutch singer-songwriter. She is best known as one half of Maywood (duo) with her sister Caren Wood.

== Career ==
May and her sister formed the singing duo Maywood (duo) in the 1970s. May wrote the lyrics for the tracks as well as composing the music. The duo had hits in the Netherlands, Australia, Sweden, Germany and South Africa.

As a solo artist, May wrote Wait For Me for Shannah for the National Song Contest 1989.

May and her sister Caren Wood represented the Netherlands at the Eurovision Song Contest in 1990 with the song I Want To Share Everything With You. They came in fifteenth place.

In 1997 Alice May recorded her own CD single "Rise In The Morning". In the same year she also released a Christmas single for the ‘Family Help Program’ Holland in Sri Lanka, entitled "One World Family". Away from singing, she teaches singing and music lessons.

May reformed Maywood in 2010, with Inge Peters. The pair re-released their single Rio for the World Cup in 2014.

Singles

Year	Title	Chart positions				
Year	Title	NL	AUS	GER	SA	SWED
1978	Since I Met You	—				
1979	You Treated Me Wrong	35			—	
1979	Mother How Are You Today	10		—		
1980	Late At Night	1	72	18	11	7
1980	Give Me Back My Love	7	—	27	2	
1981	Distant Love	14	—	—	16	
1981	Rio	3	—	—	—	
1981	Mano	10				
1982	Get Away	17		—		
1982	Star	17				
1982	I Believe in Love	—		—		
1983	Ask for Tina	—				
1983	Show Me the Way To Paradise	43				
1984	Standing In The Twilight	23				
1985	It Takes A Lifetime	—				
1985	Lonely Nights	—				
1986	When I Look Into Your Eyes	—				
1987	Help The Children Of Brazil	—				
1987	If You Need A Friend	86				
1987	Break Away	—				
1989	Kom In Mijn Armen	33				
1989	Hey Hey Hey	—				
1990	Ik Wil Alles Met Je Delen	42		—		
1990	Ik Blijf Naar Jou Verlangen	—				
1991	Da Doo Ron Ron					
