= Ajax-mars =

Official song of AFC Ajax

"Ajax-mars" (English: Ajax march) is the official club song of Dutch association football club AFC Ajax since 1918.

The song was first heard on the 31 March 1918 when Ajax clinched their first ever division championship in a 4–1 win over Sparta Rotterdam. Sparta had won consecutive championships the previous three seasons with Bok de Korver, but when Ajax starlets Jan de Natris and Wim Gupffert scored three goals in three minutes, the crowd at Het Houten Stadion were jumping and chanting what would become the blueprint for this song. The words to the song were then written by Dirk Knegt, and it was composed by Emile Painparé. It was performed at the stadium by an orchestra during the championship celebration.

On 9 June 1918 Ajax then won the National championship without losing a single match. In the version of 1918 the word 'heil' was in the lyrics in place of the word 'hup', the word was however replaced in 1963 due to its association with the Nazi occupation and the Third Reich. The oldest known recording of the song is from 1919 performed by the Odeon Orchestra, followed in 1932 an instrumental version by the orchestra of Jack Presburg on Ultraphon, later also released on Telefunken. In 1950 Max van Praag recorded the song with the Accordiola Orchestra. The last recording is from 1963 by Fred Wiegman and the City Theater Orchestra.
