= Raskolnikov (band) =

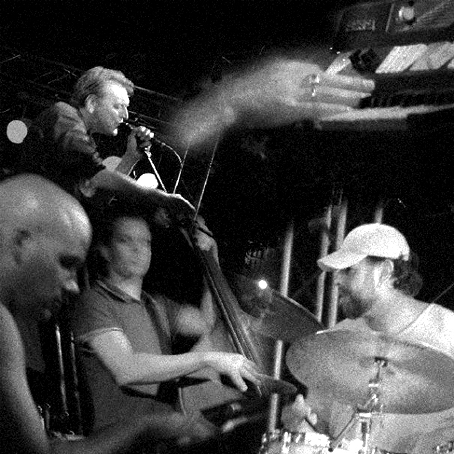
- Raskolnikov 2009

Background information
- Origin: Rotterdam, South Holland, Netherlands
- Genres: Alternative jazz, Singer-songwriter
- Years active: 1998–present
- Members: Mark Ritsema, Peter Jessen, Ron de Bruyn, Chris Grem
- Website: Raskolnikov

Raskolnikov is a Rotterdam-based band, consisting of four well-known musicians in the Dutch music world. They were brought together by singer, guitarist and songwriter Mark Ritsema (Nightporter, former Spasmodique) in the late nineties to be the house band of a local radio show called Studio Gloria. A sort of best of these sessions was released in September '99 as their highly acclaimed debut album Studio Gloria. During the last decade, the group released two more albums, played throughout Holland, wrote and performed music for a dance performance and a theatre show, did support shows for Jools Holland and 16 Horsepower and became regular musical guests at VPRO radio.

The promotional website for Dutch artists dutchsound.nl wrote about their second album The Jezebel Shanty: “Subdued jazz, melancholy soul, soul-searching shanties, and baroque themes. Inner city blues, imaginary nighttime travels through town full of down-on-their-luck characters, dives, unrequited love and the inevitable morning hangover. (...) The make-up of piano, contrabass, and percussion lends a loose, almost jazzy feel to the proceedings. Think atmosphere and depth instead of tightness and rock 'n' roll machismo. The Jezebel Shanty is a remarkable reflection of a band's unique look on life.”

After a short break (but still meeting each other in several other bands and projects) the fab four reunited as Raskolnikov in the winter of 2009.

== Discography ==
| 1999 | Studio Gloria | CD |
| 2003 | The Jezebel Shanty | CD |
| 2005 | Portrait Of Raskolnikov As A Young Man Part 1 | Downloadable CD |
