= Dictator (Centerfold song) =

Single by Centerfold

from the album Man's Ruin
- Released: April 1986
- Genre: Dance
- Length: 3:40
- Label: Injection Disco Dance Label
- Songwriter(s): Rowan Moore, Peter van Asten, Richard de Bois
- Producer(s): Onno van de Laak

Centerfold singles chronology
"Rough" (1985)	"Dictator" (1986)	"Up and Coming" (1986)

"Dictator" is a 1986 song by Dutch female group Centerfold. The song was written by Centerfold member Rowan Moore, together with Peter van Asten and Richard de Bois. It was a huge hit in the Netherlands, reaching Number 6 in the Dutch Top 40 on 24 May 1986. It also appears on their debut album Man's Ruin.

== Track listing ==
7" Injection 134.726
No.	Title	Length
1.	"Dictator"	3:40
2.	"Dictator (Instrumental Version)"	3:40

12" Injection 234.726
No.	Title	Length
1.	"Dictator (Dance Mix)"	7:31
2.	"Dictator (Instrumental Version)"	3:30

== Charts ==
=== Weekly charts ===
Chart (1986)	Peak position
Belgium (Ultratop 50 Flanders)	19
Netherlands (Dutch Top 40)	6
Netherlands (Single Top 100)	6

=== Year-end charts ===
Chart (1986)	Position
Netherlands (Dutch Top 40)	47
Netherlands (Single Top 100)	50
