= 677 Aaltje =

Main-belt minor planet

Discovery
- Discovered by: August Kopff
- Discovery site: Heidelberg
- Discovery date: 18 January 1909

Designations
- Alternative designations: 1909 FR

Orbital characteristics
- Epoch 31 July 2016 (JD 2457600.5)
- Uncertainty parameter 0
- Observation arc: 109.68 yr (40062 d)
- Aphelion: 3.1092 AU (465.13 Gm)
- Perihelion: 2.8043 AU (419.52 Gm)
- Semi-major axis: 2.9568 AU (442.33 Gm)
- Eccentricity: 0.051565
- Orbital period (sidereal): 5.08 yr (1857.1 d)
- Mean anomaly: 349.034°
- Mean motion: 0° 11^{m} 37.86^{s} / day
- Inclination: 8.4812°
- Longitude of ascending node: 272.799°
- Argument of perihelion: 276.733°

Physical characteristics
- Mean radius: 14.435±0.85 km
- Synodic rotation period: 16.608 h (0.6920 d)
- Geometric albedo: 0.2794±0.037
- Absolute magnitude (H): 9.6

677 Aaltje is a main-belt minor planet orbiting the Sun, discovered by August Kopff at Heidelberg on January 18, 1909. It was named after the Dutch singer Aaltje Noordewier-Reddingius.

This object has a geometric albedo of 0.2794. Photometric observations during 2008 showed a rotation period of 16.6076 ± 0.0006 hours and a brightness variation of 0.30 ± 0.02 in magnitude.

677 Aaltje is orbiting within the 7/3 Kirkwood gap. This means it has a 7:3 orbital resonance with Jupiter, completing seven orbits for every three orbits of the planet. For smaller objects, this would typically lead to orbital instability, causing it to shift to a different orbital period. However, 677 Aaltje is too large for its orbit to have been moved by more than about 0.01 AU over the lifetime of the Solar System. What is more likely is that orbital interactions with the dwarf planet Ceres may have shifted it to the present-day orbit—the orbit of 677 Aaltje leads it into relatively close encounters with Ceres.
