= Humphrey Campbell =

Dutch singer and record producer (1958–2024)

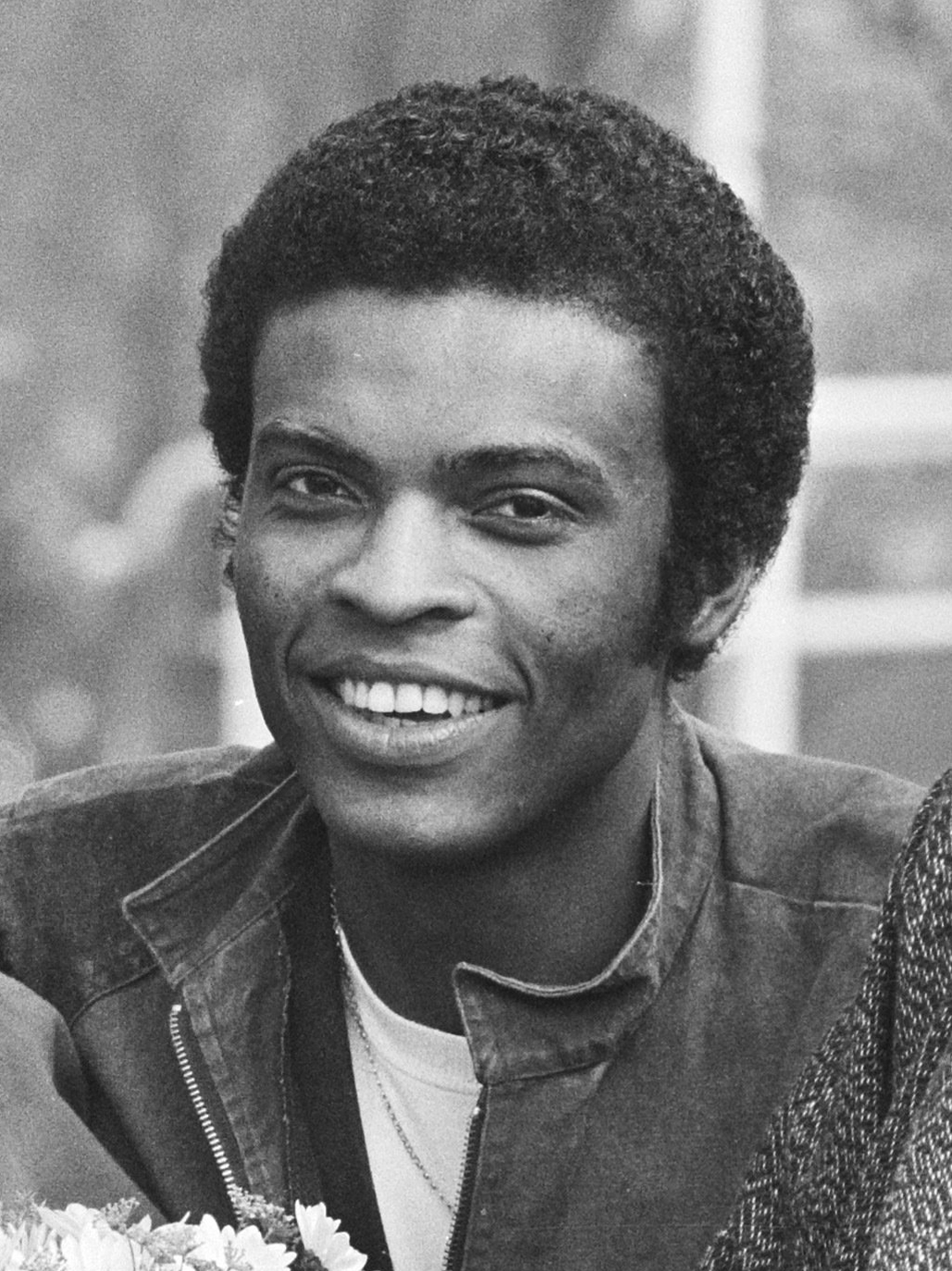
- Campbell in 1984

Background information
- Born: 26 February 1958; Moengo, Suriname
- Died: 25 March 2024 (aged 66) Dronten, Netherlands
- Genres: Pop
- Occupations: Singer, record producer

Humphrey Campbell (26 February 1958 – 25 March 2024) was a Dutch singer and record producer of Surinamese descent, known for his participation in the Eurovision Song Contest 1992.

== Early career ==
Campbell moved to the Netherlands in 1973 before Suriname's independence in 1975 and later studied and taught at the Hilversum Conservatorium. He gained experience in musical theater theatre, working with singers such as Denise Jannah and Madeline Bell.

== Eurovision Song Contest ==
Campbell took part in the Dutch Eurovision selection in 1992, when his song "Wijs me de weg" (English version; "Open your eyes") was chosen from 12 entrants as the country's representative in the Eurovision Song Contest 1992, held in Malmö, Sweden on 9 May. Performing last of the 23 entrants and joined on stage by brothers Carlo and Ben, Campbell finished the evening in ninth place. Campbell's backing singers in Malmö included Ruth Jacott; the following year Campbell would return the favour by appearing as a backing singer when Jacott represented the Netherlands in the Eurovision Song Contest 1993. Campbell and Jacott would subsequently become a couple till 2011.

== Later career ==
Following his Eurovision appearances, Campbell concentrated on his career as a producer, although in 1997, under the name of CC Campbell with brothers Carlo and Charles, he released an album, Souls in Harmony. This was not successful, and he returned to producing. Campbell has worked with artists such as Judith Jobse and Rob de Nijs, as well as continuing to work with Jacott.

== Death ==
Campbell died of cancer on 25 March 2024, at the age of 66.

Awards and achievements
Preceded by Maywood with "Ik wil alles met je delen"	Netherlands in the Eurovision Song Contest; 1992	Succeeded by Ruth Jacott with "Vrede"
