= Kim Hoorweg =

Dutch singer-songwriter

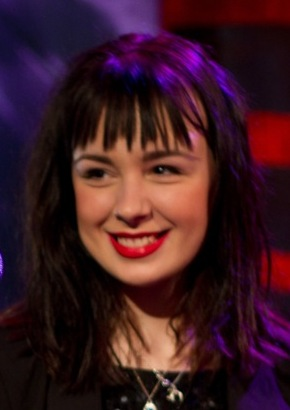
- Kim Hoorweg (2011)

Background information
- Born: 9 December 1992; Utrecht
- Genres: Traditional pop, Jazz
- Occupations: Singer, songwriter
- Years active: Since 2007
- Label: Challenge Records

Kim Hoorweg (born 9 December 1992) is a Dutch singer-songwriter.

== Biography ==
Kim Hoorweg is born in 1992 in Utrecht, but quickly moved to Rotterdam. As a young girl, Kim starts with cello lessons, but when she meets Trijntje Oosterhuis at the age of twelve, thanks to her father pianist Erwin Hoorweg, Kim gets inspired to sing jazz. Since then Kim takes singing classes at the conservatory in Amsterdam.

=== Albums ===
==== 2007: Kim Is Back ====
At the age of fourteen, Universal Music offers her a contract. That makes her the youngest female artist on the label Verve Records, the label on the concern. In 2007, her debut-cd Kim Is Back is released, after which she performed at North Sea Jazz Festival, with Trijntje Oosterhuis in the Heineken Music Hall and with the Metropole Orchestra

==== 2009: My Recipe for a Happy Life ====
Kim's second album was released in 2009. On My Recipe for a Happy Life Kim manages to get several international jazz artists to play on her album. On the album are artists like Prince keyboard player Chance Howard, Dutch saxophonist Candy Dulfer, jazz singer Trijntje Oosterhuis and Perquisite.

==== 2011: Why Don't You Do Right? ====
In June 2011 Kim signs a contract at Challenge Records to record her third album Why Don't You Do Right together with the jazz sextet The Houdinis. The album contains twelve jazz standards which are made famous by Peggy Lee. The first single of the album is also the first song of the album, Shady Lady Bird. The CD is a product of a theater tour which Kim did with The Houdini's. The tour called Remember Peggy Lee contained songs from Peggy Lee which are now recorded and released on CD at Challenge Records.

=== Projects ===
Beside studio albums, Kim is also doing other projects. She is performing with The Kimcompany, a band which exists of eight Dutch musicians, led by pianist Erwin Hoorweg. With this funk and soul-jazz formation she performed on The Hague Jazz, IJsseljazz, Amersfoort Jazz, Jazz in Duketown and the Enschede International Jazzfestival. Another project is Back to the Roots, in which Kim performs in a special setting, together with Shirma Rouse. With percussion, keyboard and bass they sing several songs of Ella Fitzgerald en Aretha Franklin. Also, Kim is one of the founders of Bongomatik, a formation which make music that is a mix of Latin, pop and jazz. The bandleaders are known from their participation in bands like Drums United, the Houdini's, Nueva Manteca, Orkater and the formation works together with musicians like Marco Borsato, Raul Midón, Trijntje Oosterhuis, Candy Dulfer en Gino Vannelli.

== Discography ==
=== Studio albums ===
Year	Title	Peak chart positions		Certifications
Year	Title	NL	BE	NL
2007	Kim is Back	49		
2009	My recipe for a happy life	67		
2011	Why Don't You Do Right?			
