= Ruth Jacott =

Surinamese-Dutch singer (born 1960)

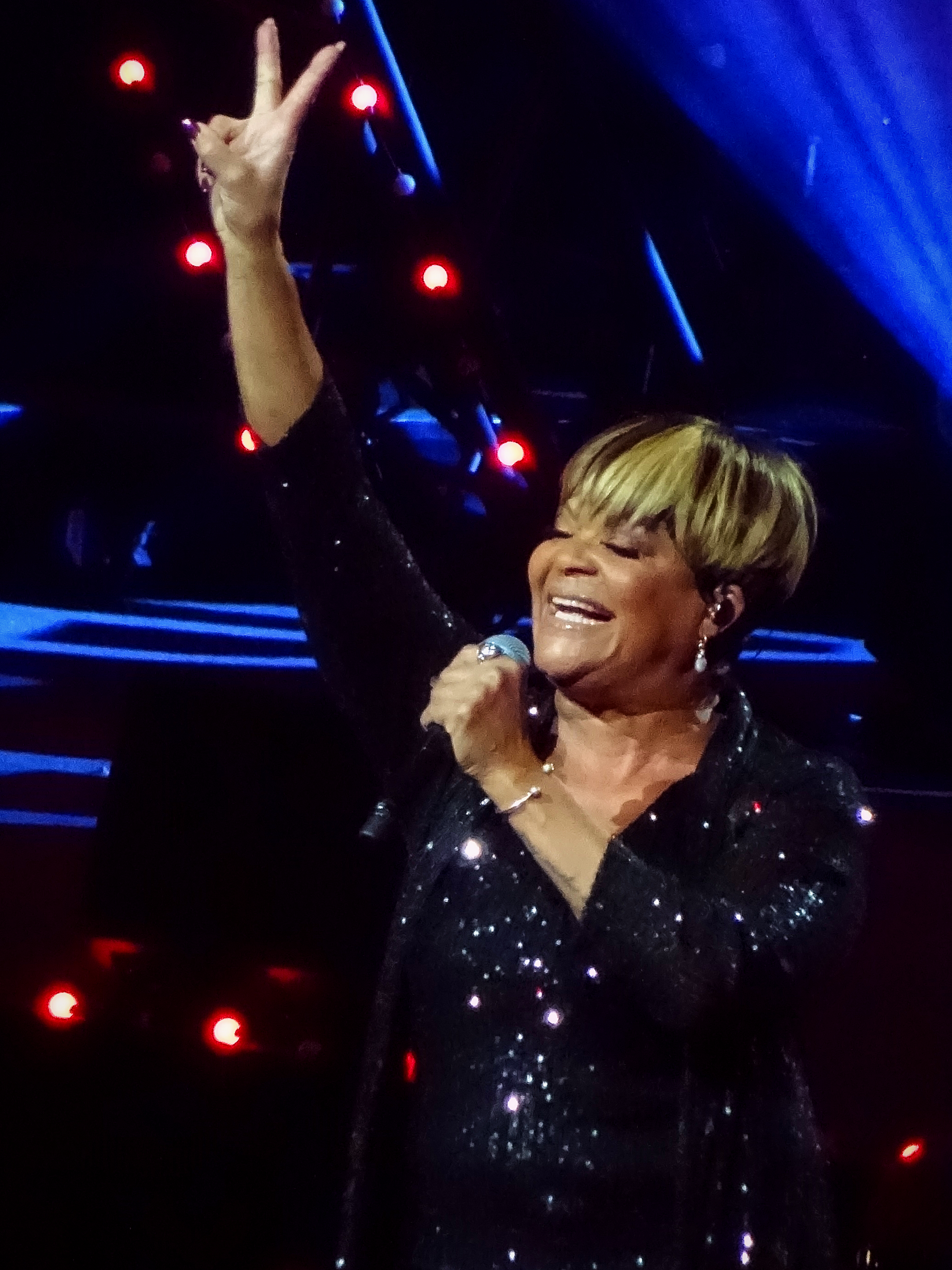
- Jacott at Het Grote Songfestivalfeest, 2019

Background information
- Born: 2 September 1960 (age 65); Paramaribo, Suriname
- Genres: Pop
- Occupation: Singer
- Years active: 1988–present
- Label: CNR Music
- Website: https://www.ruthjacott.nl/

Ruth Jacott (born 2 September 1960) is a Surinamese-Dutch singer.

Jacott transitioned from musical theatre to popular music in 1993, when she represented the Netherlands at the Eurovision Song Contest 1993. Her song, "Vrede" (Peace), was one of the favorites to win, and ended up ranking sixth out of 25 at Millstreet. She has since released nine Dutch-language albums, four of which made the Top Ten on the Dutch music charts.

== Biography ==
Ruth Jacott was born in Suriname and at nine, moved with her family to The Netherlands, where at 17 she took part in a talent contest, after which she received many offers to perform. She dropped out of the Hilversum Conservatory and began her career with The Vips and bands like The Skymasters, the VARA-Dansorkest and the Metropole Orkest.

=== Breakthrough ===
In 1988, Jacott won the Knokke Festival in Belgium. After this success, she had many offers to work in the musical world. She landed key roles in Dutch and German-language productions of Cats and A Night at the Cotton Club, touring The Netherlands, Belgium, Germany and Switzerland. In 1989, Jacott received the Zilveren Harp (Silver Harp) award. One year later, she sang the duet "Tegyo Makandra" with Hans Vermeulen, in commemoration of a plane crash in Paramaribo, the capital of Suriname. The duet was also released after the 1992 crash of an El Al flight in the Bijlmer (southeast Amsterdam), and became a hit.

In 1993, her career took an important turn when she was asked to represent The Netherlands at the Eurovision Song Festival in Ireland. She received 92 points and ranked No. 6 with the song "Vrede" (Peace).

Her Dutch-language debut album Ruth Jacott was released shortly afterwards. In July, she had a big hit together with Paul de Leeuw with the duet "Blijf bij mij" (Stay with me). She sang this song solo during the Dutch heat of Eurovision. In Spring 1994, her second album "Hou me vast" (Hold me tight) came out and went double platinum in the Dutch market. In addition, she collaborated on albums with Gerard Joling, René Froger and Oscar Harris. With the charity single Buseruka, written together with listeners of Dutch radio station 3FM, she was able to collect donations for UNICEF and Oxfam Novib projects in Rwanda.

Her third album "Geheimen" (Secrets) was released in 1995 and went gold. She performed shows in major Dutch theaters, but became exhausted and needed to rest her voice. In February 1997, she was honored with a "Golden Harp" award. Two months later, her album Hartslag (Heartbeat) was released, which was also successful and was followed by another tour.

The compilation album Altijd Dichtbij (Always close) was released in 1998 and contained a selection of five years of hits. She sang the theme song of the Dutch film Kruimeltje.

=== 2000s ===
In 2000, she had an operation on her vocal cords. Once she recovered, she embarked on a new theater-tour. Her album Vals verlangen (False desire) went gold and in October, she performed at Amsterdam's Carré Theater which was filmed by TV network RTL 4 and recorded for CD release.

In 2002, the album Tastbaar (Tangible) was released and the single Onderhuids (Under my skin). Both were produced by Humphrey Campbell and the Dutch singing duo Fluitsma & Van Tijn. Two years later, the duet Nu Is Het Over (Now it's over) with Mark Dakriet (Re-Play) was released.

In 2004, the compilation CD Het Beste Van Ruth Jacott' (The best of Ruth Jacott) was released.

In the 2005–06 Dutch theater season, Ruth was again in Dutch theaters with her show A Touch of Latin in which she sang both in Dutch and Spanish, with some numbers reworked in a Latin style. By popular demand, the tour was prolonged and followed by a second tour in the 2006–07 season.

In 2008, Jacott played the title role in the musical Billie Holiday about the legendary African American singer. Her performance was well received by both critics and the public. On 2 June 2008, she received the Dutch Musical Award for "Best Female Lead in a Small Musical". In December, Ruth appeared with her own Christmas show, which was also well received.

On 23 March 2009, the single Jammer, maar helaas (Too bad) was released from her Latin double-CD Passie (Passion), which followed on 20 April 2009. CD 1 contained the original-language versions and CD 2 the Dutch-language versions. Passie was promoted with another tour starting in autumn of 2009.

=== 2010s ===
In 2010, Jacott was a guest at the "Toppers" concert in the Amsterdam ArenA, where a quartet of well-known Dutch-language pop singers performed a high-camp show and where other top Dutch musical stars appeared as special guests. Jacott played a supporting role in 't Spaanse Schaep (The Spanish Sheep) as Jopie Vrijman. In June 2010, Jacott climbed Alpe d'Huez for the Radio 2 team on Radio 2's evening commute show "Knooppunt Kranenbarg" (Kranenbarg Junction). In 2016, she participated in the song-exchange-programme Ali B op volle toeren; Jacott was paired to rapper I Am Aisha who reworked Vrede.

Starting in February 2011, Jacott can be seen in her one-woman show Simply the Best, in which she performs songs and tells her life story in between the songs. On 4 October, she released a new single duet with Edsilia Rombley called "Uit Het Oog, Niet Uit Mijn Hart".

== Discography ==
=== Albums ===
Album title	Release date	Charting in the Dutch Album Top 100			Comments
Album title	Release date	Date of entry	Highest	Weeks	Comments
Ruth Jacott	1993	1 May 1993	30	23	Platinum
Hou me vast	1994	14 May 1994	2	80	2× Platinum
Geheimen	1995	14 October 1995	8	40	Gold
Hartslag	1997	12 April 1997	2	35	Platinum
Altijd dichtbij: De hitcollectie	1998	7 March 1998	11	16	Compilation
Vals verlangen	1999	1 May 1999	6	16	Gold
Live in Carré	2000	2 December 2000	44	13	Live album
Tastbaar	2002	16 November 2002	28	9	
Het beste van Ruth Jacott	2004	13 March 2004	23	14	Compilation
Passie	17 April 2009	25 April 2009	13	18	
A tribute to Billie Holiday	2010	20 November 2010	41	3	with the Metropole Orkest dir. by Michael Abene
Simply the Best	2012	15 Maart 2012	20	12	Live album
Ik Adem Je In	2014	03 Oktober 2014	09	11	
RUTH LIVE - EP	2020	30 April 2020	49	09	Live ep

=== Singles ===
Single title	Release date	Charting in the Dutch Top 40			Comments
Single title	Release date	Date of entry	Highest	Weeks	Comments
Teygo Makandra	1989	19 May 1990	tip17	-	met Hans Vermeulen / No. 60 in de Single Top 100
Teygo Makandra	1992	24 October 1992	20	4	met Hans Vermeulen / re-release / No. 27 in de Single Top 100 / Alarmschijf
Vrede	1993	15 May 1993	16	7	Eurovisiesongfestival / No. 16 in de Single Top 100
Blijf bij mij	1993	3 July 1993	5	10	met Paul de Leeuw / No. 5 in de Single Top 100 / Alarmschijf
Onderweg naar morgen	1994	5 February 1994	24	5	Tune voor de soap Onderweg Naar Morgen / No. 15 in de Single Top 100
Vrij met mij	1994	23 April 1994	25	6	No. 19 in de Single Top 100
Buseruka (Lied voor Rwanda) / Ik kan echt zonder jou	1994	16 July 1994	8	12	No. 8 in de Single Top 100
Ik hou zoveel van jou (Rad van fortuin)	1994	15 October 1994	33	3	No. 30 in de Single Top 100
Zon voor de maan	1994	17 December 1994	tip18	-	
You've got a friend	1995	9 September 1995	3	6	met Marco Borsato & René Froger / No. 3 in de Single Top 100
Ik ga door	1995	30 September 1995	20	5	No. 24 in de Single Top 100
Kippevel	1995	25 November 1995	tip11	-	
Hij gaat voor C!	1997	8 February 1997	3	8	als BN'ers voor BNN / No. 3 in de Single Top 100
Hartslag	1997	5 April 1997	32	6	No. 39 in de Single Top 100
Altijd dichtbij	1997	5 July 1997	tip2	-	Ter promotie van KPN telefonie / No. 49 in de Single Top 100
Liefde of lust	1997	18 October 1997	tip16	-	No. 81 in de Single Top 100
Wat jij wil	1997	-			No. 76 in de Single Top 100
Het laatste moment	1998	-			No. 86 in de Single Top 100
Leun op mij	1999	27 March 1999	11	11	No. 13 in de Single Top 100
Kop dicht en kus me	1999	-			No. 92 in de Single Top 100
Kruimeltje	1999	-			Titelsong Kruimeltje / No. 85 in de Single Top 100
Waar ben je nou?	2000	-			No. 68 in de Single Top 100
Onderhuids	2002	-			No. 93 in de Single Top 100
Nu het over is	2004	-			met Mark / No. 37 in de Single Top 100
Als je iets kan doen	6 January 2005	15 January 2005	1(4wk)	9	als Artiesten voor Azië / No. 1 in de Single Top 100 / Alarmschijf
Jammer maar helaas	2009	-			
Seki Marinda	2009	-			
Kom dans met mij	2009	-			
Terug bij mij	2009	-			
Uit Het Oog, Niet Uit Mijn Hart	4 October 2011	-	TBD		

Awards and achievements
Preceded by Humphrey Campbell with "Wijs me de weg"	Netherlands in the Eurovision Song Contest; 1993	Succeeded by Willeke Alberti with "Waar is de zon?"
