= Caren Wood =

Dutch singer

- Also known as: Caren Maywood
- Born: 24 February 1953 (age 72)
- Occupation: Singer-songwriter
- Formerly of: Maywood (band)

Caren Wood (or Doetie (Doetje) de Vries) born in Harlingen, 24 February 1953) is a Dutch singer, best known for her work with group Maywood with her sister Alice Maywood

== Career ==
She formed the singing duo Maywood (band) with her sister Alice May. They represented the Netherlands in the Eurovision Song Contest in 1990 with the song I Want To Share Everything With You, the duo came in, in fifteenth place. The duo had hits in the Netherlands, Australia, Sweden, Germany and South Africa.

== Solo career ==
In 2007, Wood began her solo career by teaming up with the then cabaret artist Henk Smaling and returned to the stage in the program Hotel Weemoed.

Wood then decided to work as a nurse for the elderly. In November 2010, Wood performed with the band Kayak at the memorial concert for Pim Koopman, former drummer and producer of Maywood. She sometimes shares rare posts on her social media pages about her family life. She is married.

=== Singles ===
Year	Title	Chart positions				
Year	Title	NL	AUS	GER	SA	SWED
1978	Since I Met You	—				
1979	You Treated Me Wrong	35			—	
1979	Mother How Are You Today	10		—		
1980	Late at Night	1	72	18	11	7
1980	Give Me Back My Love	7	—	27	2	
1981	Distant Love	14	—	—	16	
1981	Rio	3	—	—	—	
1981	Mano	10				
1982	Get Away	17		—		
1982	Star	17				
1982	I Believe in Love	—		—		
1983	Ask for Tina	—				
1983	Show Me the Way To Paradise	43				
1984	Standing in the Twilight	23				
1985	It Takes A Lifetime	—				
1985	Lonely Nights	—				
1986	When I Look into Your Eyes	—				
1987	Help The Children Of Brazil	—				
1987	If You Need A Friend	86				
1987	Break Away	—				
1989	Kom in Mijn Armen	33				
1989	Hey Hey Hey	—				
1990	Ik Wil Alles Met Je Delen	42		—		
1990	Ik Blijf Naar Jou Verlangen	—				
1991	Da Doo Ron Ron					
