= Maywood (duo) =

Dutch pop band

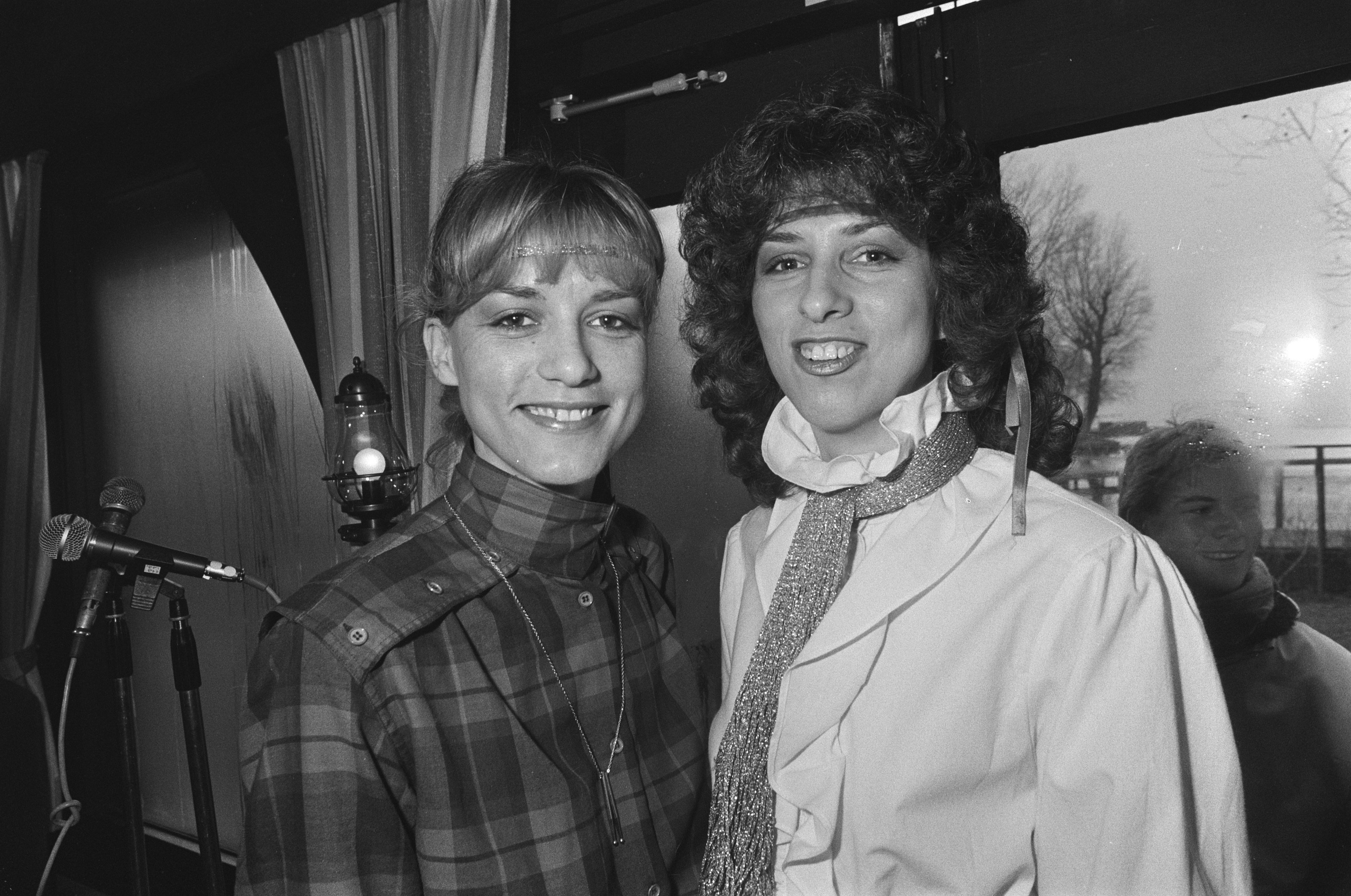
- Maywood in 1981

Background information
- Origin: Uitwellingerga, Friesland, Netherlands
- Genres: Pop
- Years active: 1978 - 1995, 2006 - 2013
- Past members: Caren Wood, Alice Maywood

Maywood was a Dutch singing duo consisting of sisters Aaltje ("Alie") and Doetje ("Edith") de Vries. They each took on a stage name for the project: Alie, a blonde, (songwriting, background and harmony vocals, keyboards) became "Alice May" (Alice Maywood) and the dark-haired Edith (lead vocals) became Caren Wood.

The duo were active as recording artists between 1978 and 1992, and their best known songs are "Late At Night" (a #1 hit in the Netherlands, and a significant chart hit in several other nations), "Give Me Back My Love", and "Rio". All but one of their singles were written solely by Alice May; "Kom In Mijn Armen", a #33 hit from 1989, was co-written by May and Aad Klaris. Through 1986, their material was produced and arranged by Pim Koopman; later records were produced by Koopman, Klaris, or Ton Scherpenzeel. They represented the Netherlands in the Eurovision Song Contest 1990 with the song "Ik wil alles met je delen" (I Want to Share Everything With You), which finished in fifteenth place. The group split up in 1995, but re-formed for a series of Gerard Joling concerts with whom they performed a medley of their hit songs including "Mother, How Are You Today" (it became one of their most popular songs in Indonesia), in October 2013. In 2006 Alice announced her return without her sister Caren, but with an unknown artist named Rose Louwers. Their first performance was in Antwerp, Belgium, in December 2006.

== Discography ==
=== Albums ===
1980 - Maywood
1981 - Different Worlds
1982 - Colour My Rainbow
1982 - Cantado En Español
1983 - Het beste van Maywood (compilation)
1987 - Beside You
1990 - Achter De Horizon
1991 - 6 Of The Thirties
1991 - Walking Back To Happiness
1992 - De Hits Van Maywood (compilation)
1994 - More Maywood
1996 - Good For Gold (compilation)
2006 - Alle 40 Goed (Box Set 4 CD Collection) (compilation, Netherlands)
2008 - Hollandse Sterren Collectie (compilation)

=== Singles ===
Year	Title	Chart positions				
Year	Title	NL	AUS	GER	SA	SWED
1978	Since I Met You	—				
1979	You Treated Me Wrong	35			—	
1979	Mother How Are You Today	10		—		
1980	Late At Night	1	72	18	11	7
1980	Give Me Back My Love	7	—	27	2	
1981	Distant Love	14	—	—	16	
1981	Rio	3	—	—	—	
1981	Mano	10				
1982	Get Away	17		—		
1982	Star	17				
1982	I Believe in Love	—		—		
1983	Ask for Tina	—				
1983	Show Me the Way To Paradise	43				
1984	Standing In The Twilight	23				
1985	It Takes A Lifetime	—				
1985	Lonely Nights	—				
1986	When I Look Into Your Eyes	—				
1987	Help The Children Of Brazil	—				
1987	If You Need A Friend	86				
1987	Break Away	—				
1989	Kom In Mijn Armen	33				
1989	Hey Hey Hey	—				
1990	Ik Wil Alles Met Je Delen	42		—		
1990	Ik Blijf Naar Jou Verlangen	—				
1991	Da Doo Ron Ron					
1994	Blue Sundaymorning					

Awards and achievements
Preceded by Justine Pelmelay with "Blijf zoals je bent"	Netherlands in the Eurovision Song Contest; 1990	Succeeded by Humphrey Campbell with "Wijs me de weg" No representation in 1991
