= Rolinha Kross =

Dutch singer

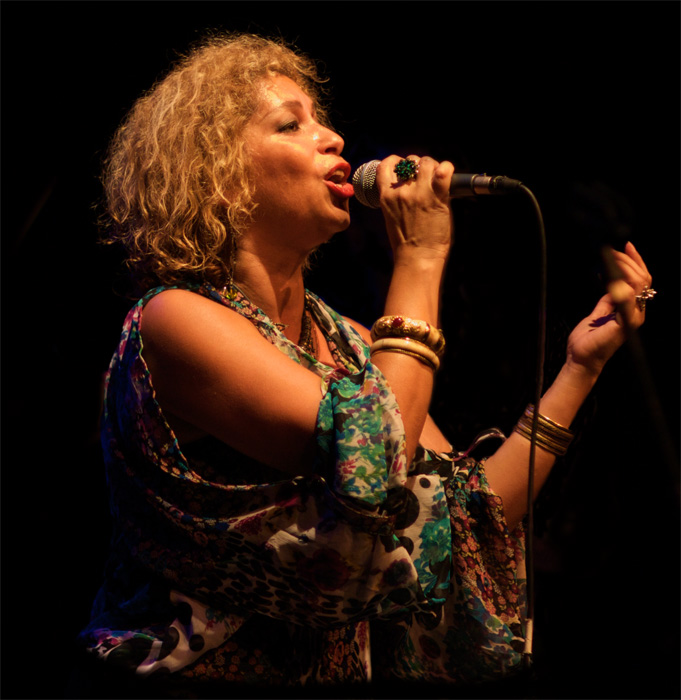

Background information
- Genres: World music, Klezmer, Dutch music, Jazz
- Website: http://www.rolinhakross.com

Rolinha Kross (born 16 June 1961) is a Dutch singer with a Jewish/Czech mother and a Surinamese father. From an early age, she was fascinated by Eastern European music and the Yiddish language. She performed with various groups, a.o. with her mother, Ilona Cechova, under the name "Sense". She followed the vocalprogram in jazz and light music at the Conservatory in Hilversum (now in Amsterdam).

Immediately after the academy, she went on tour with the musical "You're The Top", with Willem Nijholt in the lead. Meanwhile, she worked with Klezmokum, Solomon Klezmorim and various jazz ensembles. The Rolinha Kross Trio, together with Bokkie Vink and Theo van Tol, recorded an album "Tsigayner Klezmer". Many performances followed at home and abroad, among them Canada and Curaçao.

A tour with Ramses Shaffy along theaters in the Netherlands and Belgium proceeded together with a production of Ira Gershwin with Ernst Daniël Smid, Mathilde Santing en Denise Jannah. Subsequently, Rolinha worked together with the klezmer group Mazzeltov, with whom she performed often at home and abroad, and recorded four albums. With Mazzeltov Rolinha performed three times at the Concertgebouw in Amsterdam.

Recently, Rolinha plays in the musical performance "Iberia" which she and Perry Dossett developed. With guitarist Harold Berghuis she delivers a program of Yiddish poetry (translated by Willy Brill) that they have put to music. She often performs as a guest in the show of "Frank in Person" with jazz standards. On top of that, the newly created Rolinha Kross Quartet brings Dutch lyrics to gypsy jazz music. They are currently working on an album.

Rolinha Kross regularly hosts singing workshops. Her voice can be heard in commercials and commentary on documentaries.

== Discography ==
- 'Jiddische Sjmoesmuziek' (1994) Sense: Ilona Cechova & Rolinha Kross – Syncoop produkties
- 'Tsigayner Klezmer' (2000) Rolinha Kross trio – Syncoop produkties
- 'Tsores & Cheyn' (2002) Mazzeltov & Rolinha Kross – Music & Words
- 'Mishpoge' (2004) Mazzeltov & Rolinha Kross – Music & Words
- 'Amsterdam' (2007) Mazzeltov & Rolinha Kross – Music & Words
- 'Mayn Umru' (2009) Mazzeltov & Rolinha Kross – Music & Words
