= 4 AM (band) =

Dutch boy band

- Origin: Netherlands
- Genres: Pop
- Years active: 2005-2006
- Past members: Koen; Jeff; Daan; Xander

4 AM was an Amsterdam-based Dutch boy band formed in 2005. 4 AM was composed of Koen, Jeff and Daan and Xander. The band dissolved in 2006.

== Career ==
In August 2005, 4 AM had a hit with the Las Vegas-themed "Wake Up Call" that reached #24 in the MegaTop 100 They followed it with "Livin' on Love"

The band also appeared on the Hummertime, a Dutch television reality show on Jetix television.

== After break ==
After break-up of the band, member Xander Venema (born in Rotterdam, Netherlands on 27 August 1985) performing under his mononym Xander auditioned in 2008 to the first season of the Dutch version of the series Popstars but had failed to qualify. He tried a second time in series 2 of the music reality show, qualified as a finalist and finished 11th. Xander has continued a solo career after Popstar. He performs usually at the Lef gay club in Rotterdam, Netherlands. He sings in English, Dutch, Spanish and Italian.

== Discography ==
=== Singles ===
Year	Single	NL	Album	Notes
2005	"Wake Up Call"	24	Non-album release	
2006	"Livin' on Love"	-	Non-album release	
