= Kenn Hoekstra =

American video game developer

Kenn Hoekstra (born October 1, 1973), is a former video game developer who worked as an executive producer for the game development company Pi Studios in Houston, Texas. He attempted to form Category 6 Studios after leaving Pi Studios, but was unable to secure funding. He is probably best known for his game development, marketing and promotional work as a Level Designer and Project Administrator at Raven Software in Middleton, Wisconsin where he worked from February, 1997 to June, 2004. While employed at Raven Software, Hoekstra wrote a series of articles for Computer Games Magazine, GameSpy and two anthology books aimed at helping aspiring game developers break into game development. Additionally, he maintains a section of his personal website dedicated to getting a job in the game development industry.

Hoekstra studied at the University of Wisconsin–Whitewater.

Kenn joined PopHorror in August, 2016 and works for the horror website as a writer and associate editor.
