= Laurens Bogtman =

Dutch baritone

Laurens Bogtman (8 February 1900 in Oudkarspel – 1969 in Hilversum, the Netherlands) was a Dutch baritone.

Unlike many contemporary singers his career began late, at the age of 30, and he studied singing in Berlin, with Otto Iro in Vienna and with Aaltje Noordewier-Reddingius in Hilversum.

Bogtmam debuted in 1932 in a concert with the Kölner Bachverein (Cologne Bach Society). He then had a successful career as an oratorio singer in Germany, Austria and England and travelled further afield.

Following World War II, Bogtman sang in France and Belgium. In a 1957 recording of Bach's St Matthew Passion with De Nederlandse Bachvereniging, conducted by Anthon van der Horst, he was the vox Christi.
