= Mark Ritsema =

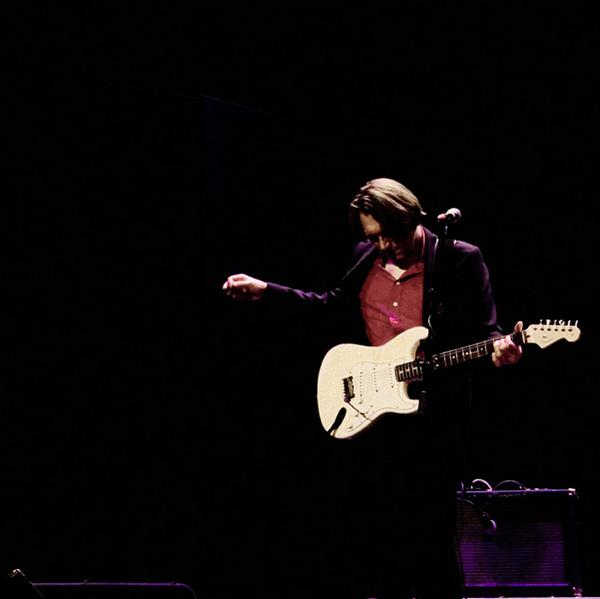
- Mark Ritsema live in Rotterdam, December 2008

Background information
- Born: Mark Jan Ritsema; 8 March 1962 (age 64); Amsterdam, Netherlands
- Genres: Post-punk, alternative jazz
- Occupations: Singer-songwriter, guitarist, writer, journalist
- Instruments: Guitar, vocals
- Years active: 1979 – present
- Website: www.markritsema.nl

Mark Ritsema (born 8 March 1962 in Amsterdam) is a singer, guitarist, songwriter, journalist and writer from the Netherlands. During the eighties and nineties he fronted cult bands Spasmodique and Cobraz and currently he plays with Raskolnikov. He also performs as the solo artist Nightporter and plays guitar for John Sinclair, Vera and Mecano.

== Early years ==
Ritsema, born in Amsterdam, grew up in Zwijndrecht and Maassluis, suburban towns near Rotterdam where he moved with his parents in 1974. After teaching himself to play guitar, Ritsema started writing songs in the late seventies, inspired by the punk and new wave movements. He formed a duo with drummer Reinier Rietveld called Evil a.k.a. Puberpunk. Around 1979 the pair (with Ritsema now on bass) joined singer/guitarist Arjo Hijmans, and guitarist Ed Versloot, to form their first serious, but short lived, band Torpedos.

== Bands ==
=== Spasmodique ===
In 1981 Ritsema began to work at a psychogeriatric nursing home in Capelle a/d IJssel. Here he met bassplayer Martin Doctors van Leeuwen and drummer Bob Stoute, who had just disbanded their band Slum. They joined forces, with Ritsema on lead vocals and guitar. Soon after their first show in a car-park in Nieuwerkerk a/d IJssel in 1982, they were joined by Reinier Rietveld on drums and Arjo Hijmans on guitar. In 1983 Stoute left. In this (classic) line-up Spasmodique remained active until 1990, gaining a solid live-reputation in the Netherlands and releasing a few cassettes during the first half of the decade. They released their first mini-album in 1986, followed by four albums, a mini-album and two singles. The quartet toured intensively throughout the Netherlands, Germany, Austria, Hungary and the former Czechoslovakia. After Hijmans left in 1990, they worked with guitar players Niek den Brave, Hans Brussee and Raymond Gerrits, and finally broke up in 1992. In 1998 the classic line-up of Spasmodique reunited. They recorded the soundtrack for the short movie In Forced Perspective by Favola Film (Rino Gouw and Hugo Goudswaard) and performed live in the Rotterdam club Rotown under the name Villa Delirium. Spasmodique started recording new material they had written around 2000. The album Villa Delirium was finally released in 2002 and the book Cellar of Roses, about Spasmodique, edited by Jean-Paul van Mierlo, was launched at the same time. After a lengthy Dutch tour Ritsema decided to leave Spasmodique, which meant the end of the band.

=== Cobraz ===
In the early nineties Ritsema started playing and composing with multi-instrumentalist Willem Cramer. Cramer had just left the Rotterdam-based multi-cultural band East Meets West. They soon recruited more (ex-)members of this band – percussionists Alex Eind, Daniël Bloem and John de Wit – to join a 1992 tour of the Netherlands with East Meets West and Hi Ho Silver, called Rotterdam Olay I (De Rotterdamse Daad). They were joined by Martin Doctors van Leeuwen on bass and changed their name to Cobraz. A CD was issued, featuring three tracks by each band on the tour. Most of the band members left after the tour, so Ritsema and Cramer were joined by percussionists Joke Hamminga (East Meets West) and Coen Aalberts (Willy Nilly), and drummer Ron de Bruijn. This line-up debuted in Rotterdam at the Metropolis Festival in 1993. Doctors van Leeuwen left to be replaced by Chris Grem. This sextet recorded Cobraz only studio album Sato Bar (produced by TC Matic guitarist and producer Jean-Marie Aerts) in 1995, and disbanded the following year.

=== (Mark Ritsema & Trio) Raskolnikov ===
In 1997 Ritsema formed Last Side Show with Jean-Marie Aerts, Chris Grem and Coen Aalberts (replaced by Ron de Bruijnduring the first Dutch tour ) but the band broke up before the end of the year due to logistic problems. Live and studio recordings were made but never released. In 1998 Ritsema was asked by the local radio station Radio Rijnmond to play during their weekly talk show Studio Gloria. Initially Ritsema reunited with Grem (on piano) and Aalberts, calling themselves Trio Raskolnikov. After a few radio shows, double bassplayer Peter Jessen was recruited and the band name was changed to Mark Ritsema & Trio Raskolnikov. Combining Ritsema's new songs, written each week, with jazzy improvisations, they rapidly became an established band that began playing throughout the Netherlands. With the financial help of Radio Rijnmond and Rotown they also released a collection of radio recordings on CD Studio Gloria (1999). In 2001 they were part of the music, dance and film performance Dorst, with Regina Magnus (choreography, dance), Sanja Hasagic (dance) and Favola Film (visuals) for Rotterdam Cultural Capital. In 2001, together with members of the Q-Club from Hoorn, Ritsema founded UNSOUND, an organisation and record label that established the musical freedom of its members in a lengthy manifest (UNSOUND0001), which is partly an indictment of the commercial, tunnel visioned, music world. In 2003 UNSOUND released new albums by both Q-Club and Raskolnikov (with Aalberts again replaced by De Bruijn), and the two bands also shared the stage during the theatrical music show UNSOUND0007, with visuals and video footage by Favola Film. The recording of the on-line-only album Portrait of Raskolnikov As A Young Man was financed by a group of Raskolnikov fans. During 2007/2008 Raskolnikov was fairly inactive, due to Ritsema's solo-activities, Grem's work for Charlie Dée and Jessens's growing activities in the classical/avant-garde music world. New live shows and recordings are being planned for 2009.

== Solo ==
From the early nineties on, Ritsema performed solo, accompanying himself on acoustic guitar. Between 2003 and 2007 this repertoire, and some new material, was recorded in Vale The Lobos Studios and Bed & BreakFast Studios in Portugal, in collaboration with producer Jules Otto, Portuguese singer/guitarist Rui Veloso and Belgian/Dutch guitarist Dany Lademacher. In A Valley of Wolves was released in late 2007 under the name Nightporter, followed by performances at Crossing Border Festival and NuMoon Fest in 2008.

== Collaborations ==
Between 1998 and 2000, Ritsema participated as guitarist in the making of several sound sculptures, with the British artist/photographer Craigie Horsfield. The works (mostly edited in length, to suit the opening hours of the gallery) were exhibited in galleries in Middelburg, Stuttgart, Brussels and London.

In 2001 Ritsema played for the first time as guitarist for the American poet and writer John Sinclair. They debuted at the Crossing Border Festivall in Amsterdam and continued playing together in the Netherlands, Italy, Spain and England.

At the same edition of Crossing Border, Waltzing The Storm, the second short movie by Favola Film was shown, with a soundtrack that Ritsema composed, sang and performed at the recording studio Studio 2X2.

In 2005 Ritsema joined the reformed, Amsterdam based, new wave band Mecano, playing mainly in Greece and France. He also performed as a duo with Mecano singer Dirk Polak in Athens. Currently Ritsema and Polak are writing songs together, calling themselves The Polar Twins.

In 2005 Ritsema produced the first demo of the young singer/songwriter Vera Juhrend and continues to play guitar in her band (with Peter Jessen and Ron de Bruijn). They recorded Vera's first album Leave A Line in mid-2008 with Dirk Polak as producer.

In 2008 Ritsema played guitar for Dutch writer and columnist Carrie in Museum Boijmans Van Beuningen (Rotterdam). Words and music were inspired by, and performed in front of, the painting Shooting Gallery by Pyke Koch.

== Writings ==
Ritsema is also a journalist who regularly contributes to the cultural monthly magazine Uit Agenda Rotterdam, and the Lowlands Festival newspaper Daily Paradise.

In 2008 Ritsema wrote a brief history of the Rotterdam underground scene in the eighties/nineties for the book Antiscene by photographer Carla van der Marel. He has also written introductions to the Spasmodique book From the Cellar of Roses (2002) and The John Sinclair reader IT'S ALL GOOD (Headpress 2009).

With visual-artist Arno van de Pol he created the graphic novel In A Valley of Wolves which accompanies the deluxe edition of the Nightporter album of the same name. They continue working on new chapters, the second being published in the literary magazine Passionate, which has also published Ritsema's short stories and poems. He has appeared in the poetry magazine Krakatau and is currently working on a novel.

== Discography ==
Year	Title	Format	Artist
1982	Animals in Springtime	Cassette	Spasmodique
1984	Demo	Cassette	Spasmodique
1985	From Rotterdam	Cassette	Spasmodique
1985	Alienation	Cassette	Spasmodique
1986	Spasmodique	LP	Spasmodique
1987	From the Cellar of Roses	LP	Spasmodique
1988	Start to Believe	LP	Spasmodique
1989	North	LP/CD	Spasmodique
1989	Primitive	7”	Spasmodique
1990	Haven	LP/CD	Spasmodique
1991	Spilling/Boston Tea Party	7”	Spasmodique
1991	Who's afraid	CD	Spasmodique
1995	Sato Bar	CD	Cobraz
1996	Evil Rhythm	CD	Cobraz
1997	In forced Percpective	OST	Spasmodique
1999	Studio Gloria	CD	Raskolnikov
2001	Waltzing The Storm	OST	Mark Ritsema
2002	From Villa Delirium	CD	Spasmodique
2003	The Jezebel Shanty	CD	Raskolnikov
2005	Portrait of Raskolnikov As A Young Man Part 1	Downloadable CD	Raskolnikov
2007	In a Valley of Wolves	CD	Nightporter
2008	Urban Sundown	Downloadable CD	Nightporter
