= Fred Wiegman =

Dutch actor and singer

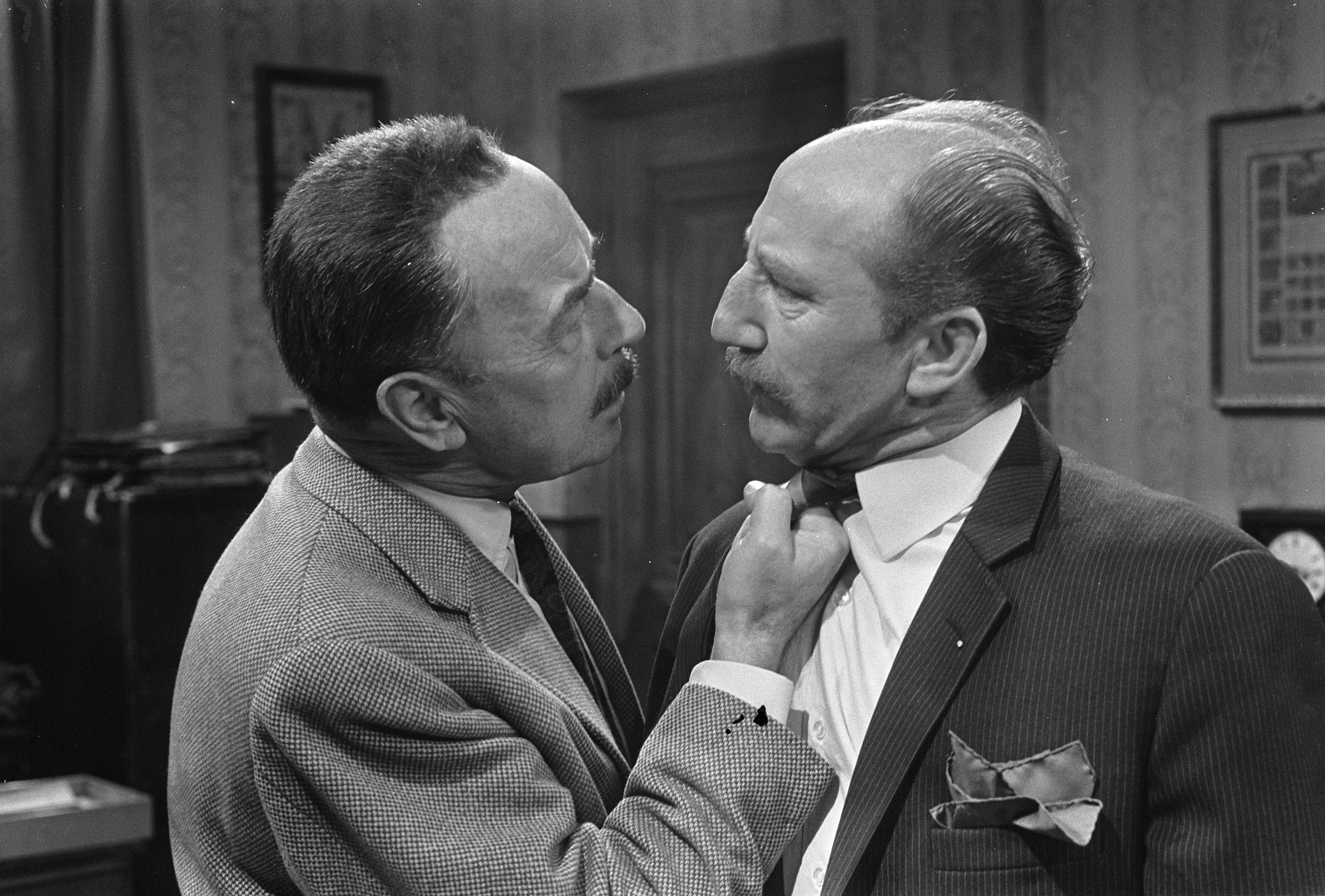
- Fred Wiegman (r.) as Gaston Mauran in La Colère de Maigret
- Born: 14 August 1924; Amsterdam, Netherlands
- Died: 19 October 1968 (aged 44); Amsterdam, Netherlands
- Occupations: Actor, singer

Fred Wiegman (14 August 1924 – 19 October 1968) was a Dutch actor and singer most known for his role in the 1961 production of 'de Schele'. He wrote and published many Levenslied songs, amongst others one of the most well-known renditions of the 'Ajax-mars' (English, Ajax march), the official song of Dutch association football club AFC Ajax. He was married to Ria Verda, a famous Dutch singer and actress.

Wiegman died in an accident, when he was hit by car in front of his house. He has starred in various Dutch movies and television shows during the span of his career.
