= Centerfold (group) =

Dutch pop band

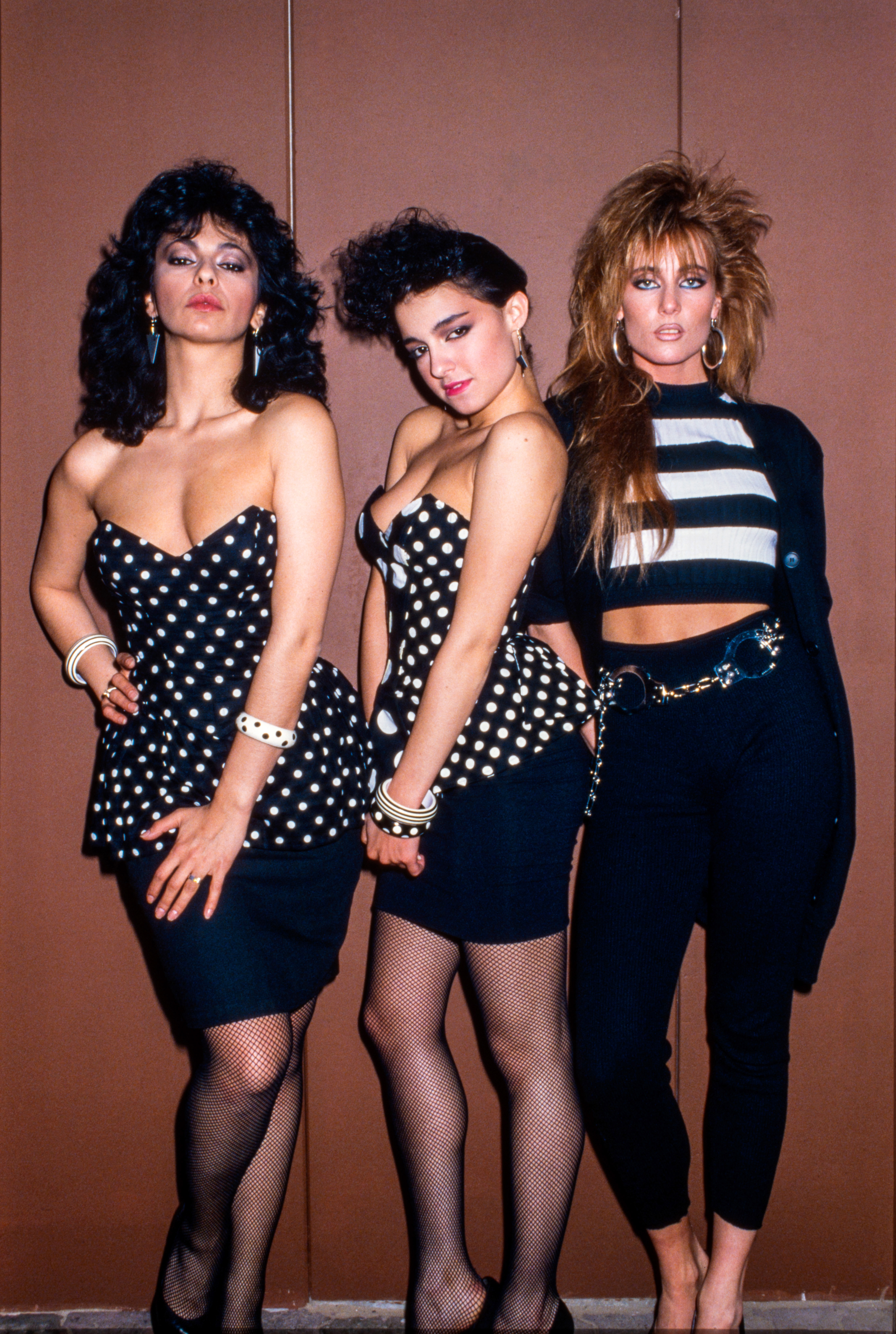
- Laura Fygi (l), Rowan Moore (c), Cecilia de la Rie (r)

Background information
- Origin: Netherlands
- Genres: Pop, dance
- Years active: 1984-1989
- Labels: Ariola / Injection Disco Dance / Red Bullet Records / CBS
- Members: Laura Fygi; Rowan Moore; Cecilia de la Rie; Sandra Noach (1988-1989)
- Website: Tribute site

Centerfold was a Dutch female pop trio that scored a string of hit records in the Netherlands during the mid to late 1980s. The original line-up consisted of Laura Fygi, Rowan Moore and Cecilia de la Rie.

== Biography ==
=== Debut single and Playboy shoot ===
Their first single Bad Boy was accompanied by a spicy photoshoot for the Dutch Playboy in 1984. The ladies performed their song naked in the popular TV-show TopPop, and soon Centerfold became a household name through their sex kitten image.

=== Breakthrough ===
The single Dictator marked the breakthrough of the group and reached Number 6 in the Dutch Top 40 and Number 19 in the Belgium Top 30. Also other European countries showed interest, and Centerfold performed the song for the German TV show WWF Club. More hits followed, such as Up and Coming and a cover of the Golden Earring classic Radar Love. Björn Ulvaeus and Benny Anderson of ABBA fame wrote a follow-up single for the girls, Bitch When I See Red. In 1987, a debut album titled Man's Ruin saw the light of release, which fared reasonably well in the Dutch album charts.

=== New line-up ===
In 1988, Cecilia de la Rie decided to leave the group and was replaced by Sandra Noach. In this new line-up, they released a single in April 1989, Play the Game. Shortly after the release, Noach committed suicide, which ended the group indefinitely. The already recorded second album Whistling at the Wolves was canceled by the record company.

== Life after Centerfold ==
Rowan Moore and Laura Fygi founded The Backlot and made one album called The Backlot and two singles: Tower of Love (#76 in the Dutch Single Top 100) and The Goodbye. Cecilia de la Rie started a new group called Red Cinder and released a mini-album in 1992. Both bands did not live a long life.

Red Bullet Records released a Best Of CD of the group in 1992. Laura Fygi went on to become a highly acclaimed jazz singer. Rowan Moore made her debut as a television moderator for Dutch broadcasting association VPRO and commercial TV.

== Discography ==
=== Singles ===
- 1984 Bad Boy (Netherlands #41)
- 1984 Pump It Up
- 1985 Rough
- 1985 Sexual Wonder Land EP (Japanese release)
- 1986 Dictator (Belgium #19 / Netherlands #6 / Netherlands Dance Charts #3)
- 1986 Up and Coming (Belgium #30 / Netherlands #28)
- 1986 Radar Love (Belgium #11 / Netherlands #14)
- 1987 Bitch When I See Red
- 1987 S.O.S. Mozambique (Netherlands #18 - Dutch Artists Sing for Mozambique)
- 1987 Intimate Climate (Netherlands #36)
- 1988 Money (Netherlands #50)
- 1989 Play the Game (Netherlands #35)

=== Albums ===
- 1987 Man's Ruin (Netherlands #67)
- 1989 Whistling at the Wolves (canceled)
- 1992 Best of Centerfold
- 1998 Man's Ruin (incl. bonus tracks) (reissue)
