= De Buddy's =

de Buddy's (also known as Jongenszanggroep de Buddy's) was a boys' show choir based in Delft, Netherlands that existed under this name from 1976 to 2005. Originally called De Nicolaessanghers, the choir was founded as a traditional church choir in 1966, beginning with thirty members aged between nine and sixteen. Inspired from the French choir Les Poppys and their hit "Non, non, rien n'a changé" (No, no, nothing has changed, 1970) the choir was renamed and changed to the pop genre. In 2005 de Buddy's was succeeded by re-speKt.

de Buddy's has held performances in and outside the country, including for Beatrix of the Netherlands. Some performances supported social projects.

== Members ==
The best known buddy, as the members were called, was Jody Bernal (nl) who had a number one hit in 2000. Other notable members were Roy van den Akker, DJ Robin Meijers and Joost Verhoeff.

== Musicals ==
Some members performed in musicals like:

- Elisabeth
- Jesus Christ Superstar
- Oliver!
- De Tondeldoos (The Tinder Box by Hans Christian Andersen).

== Repertoire ==
The choir produced many songs (pop songs, Christmas songs, children's songs, house music and cover versions of television series and the Kinderen voor Kinderen project) and assisted the musicians Tee Set (1971,72), Herman Finkers (1980), Henny Huisman (1988 and 1997), Bassie & Adriaan (since 1989), Dolf Brouwers (1991), Herman van Veen (1994) and Rollercoaster 23 (2003).

== Highlights ==
- Non, non, rien n'a changé
- Going Up Getting Down (on your Skateboard) (1979) #32 in the Dutch Top 40
- Soundmixshow with Henny Huisman for the television (1998)
- Anti-Haider-Lied (2000), protest song against Austrian politician Jörg Haider "Don't buy from Austrians", which led to a scandal
- Ik wille wille Alexander (2001) song for the engagement of Willem-Alexander, Prince of Orange and Princess Máxima of the Netherlands, contest in television show (they didn't know that it was a contest, but won)
- German CD project Voll Cool (2002) with songs like Ein Bißchen Frieden.

== Discography ==
- Hoor ik van ver muziek (single, 1971)
- Going Up Getting Down (single, 1979)
- D.I.S.C.O. (single, 1980)
- Liselotje (Pierre en de Buddy's) single, 1983
- Tiroliro (Pierre en de Buddy's) single, 1984
- Bananas and Coconuts (1992, first compact disc)
- Vakantiehits voor Kids (1996)
- Hits voor Kinderen (1996)
- De liedjes van Annie M.G. Schmidt (1996)
- St Maarten liedjes (1996) 18 Sint Maarten liedjes
- De Glimlach van een Kind (De Mini Baritons van de Buddy's) single, 1997
- Zeg Roodkapje waar ga je housen?, Alle Eendjes housen in het water, House Liedjes 4 Kids (1997)
- Een Vrolijk Kerstfeest En Een Gelukkig Nieuwjaar (single, 2000)
- Niet Kinderachtig (2000)
- Buddy's 2000 (2000)
- De Buddy's voor Oranje (single, 2001, for Maxima and Willem-Alexander)
- Voll Cool (2002, German songs under the name Die Buddies)
- Greek Songs (2003)
- Il mostro di Firenze (The Monster of Florence, 2003)
- De Reis van Zwarte Piet (DVD, 2005, re-speKt with Bassie & Adriaan)

and samplers, records for social projects like SOS Children's Villages and Kids for Animals, and the above-mentioned assistance.
