= Amersfoort Jazz =

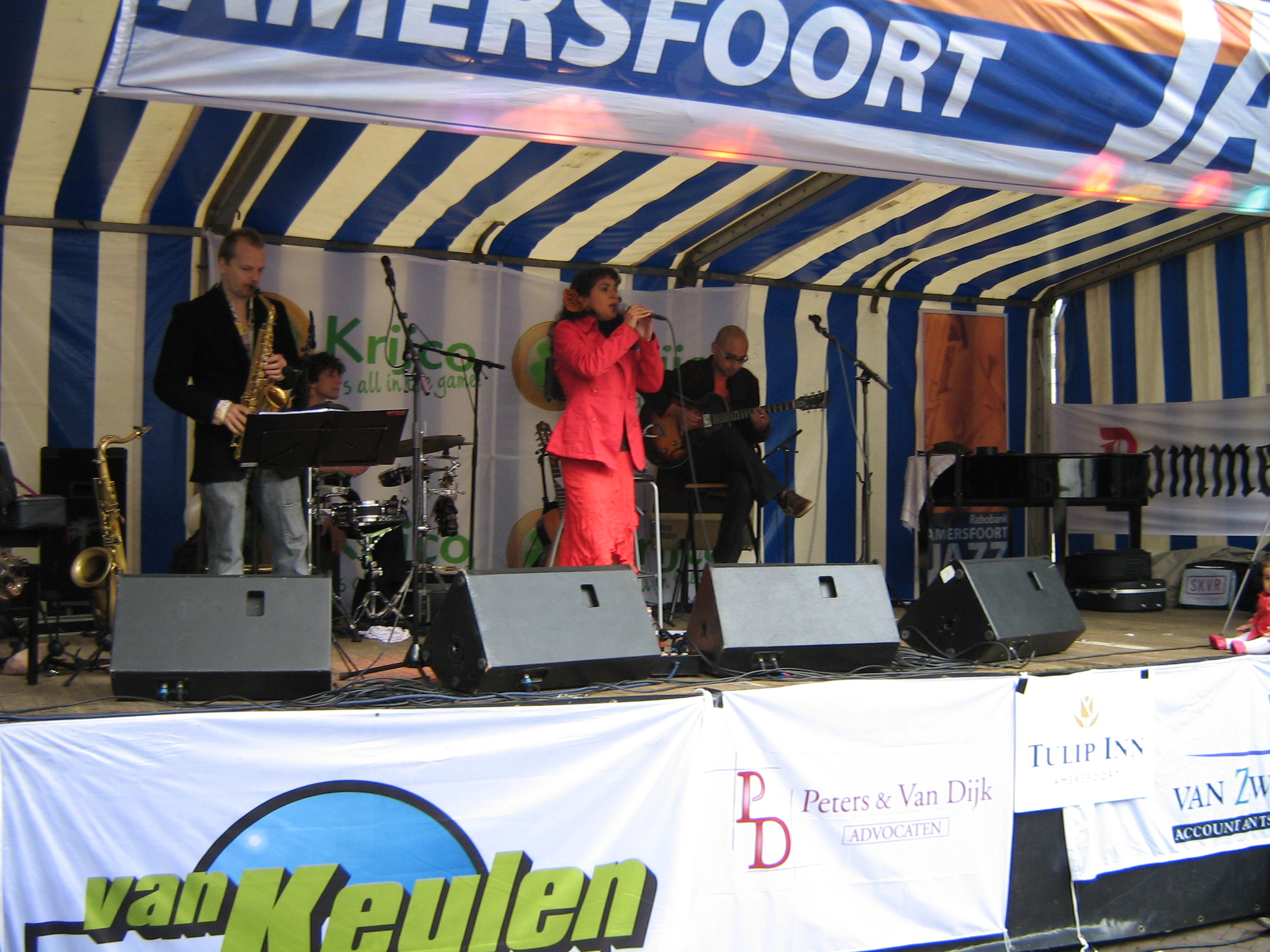
Jazz Juice at Amersfoort Jazz 2007

Amersfoort Jazz is an annual open air jazz festival in the Dutch city of Amersfoort. The festival has eight stages all over the old part of the inner city of Amersfoort, mainly on the historic squares. The festival is traditionally held in the second weekend of May, but moved in 2015 to the second weekend of June. It is a large free three-day event, and it attracts over 100,000 visitors every year.

The event had in 2014 its 35th edition and the 36th edition in 2015 was from Thursday 11 June until Sunday 14 June.
