= Laura Fygi =

Dutch jazz singer (born 1955)

- Born: 27 August 1955 (age 70); Amsterdam, Netherlands
- Genres: Vocal jazz, pop
- Occupation: Singer
- Instrument: Vocals
- Years active: 1980–present
- Labels: Mercury, Verve
- Website: www.laurafygi.com

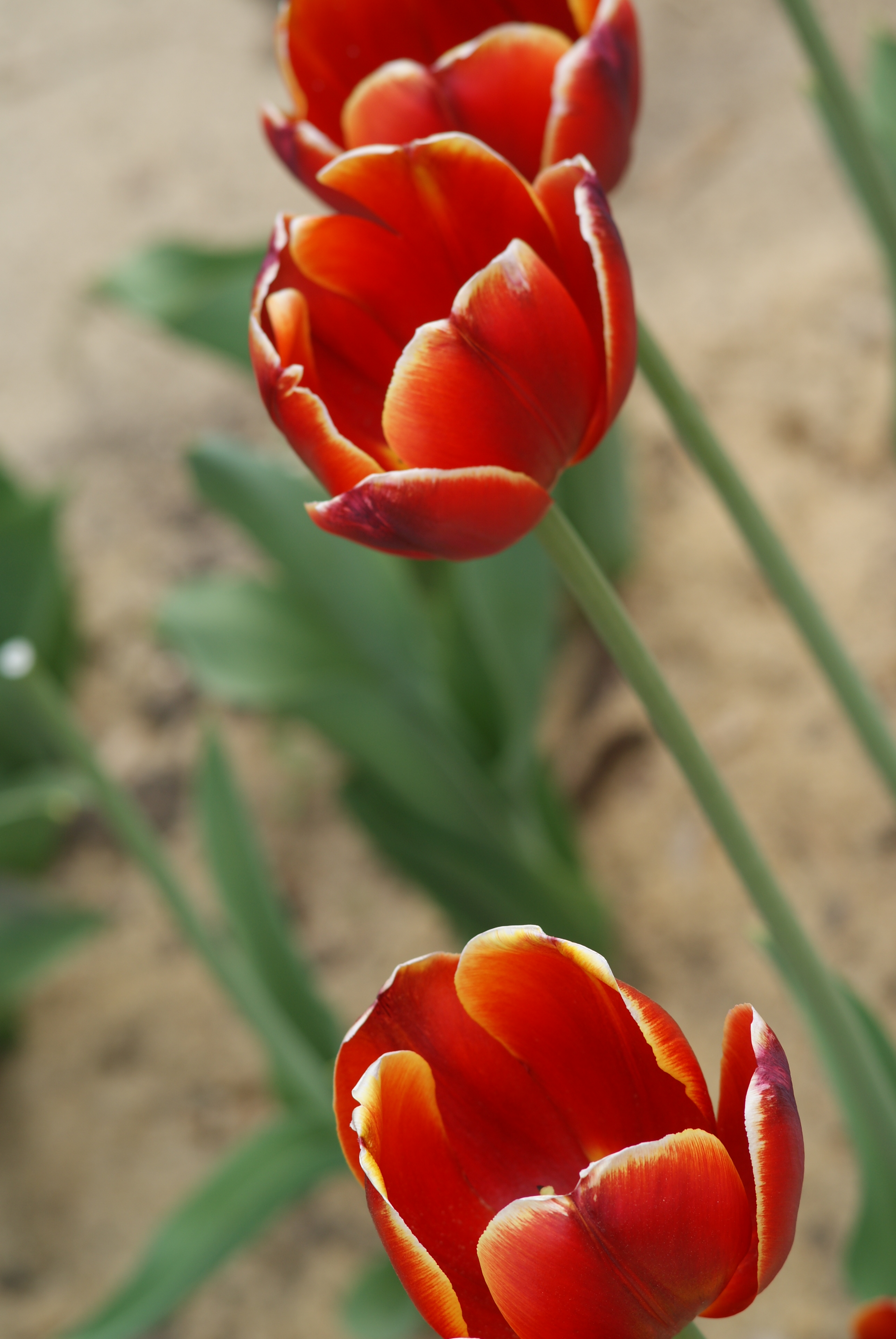
Tulipa 'Laura Fygi'

Laura Fygi (born 27 August 1955) is a Dutch jazz singer.

Fygi's father was a Dutch businessman, a director of Philips, and her mother was a belly dancer of Egyptian descent on her father's side and of Serbian descent on her mother's side. She was raised in Uruguay, until her father's death in the late 1960s, when she moved back to the Netherlands with her mother. She was then under the care of a French-speaking governess before being adopted by the principal of her school. During the 1980s, she was a member of Centerfold, an all-female Dutch disco band which was popular in Europe and Japan.

In the early 1990s, she began a solo career and recorded her debut album with Toots Thielemans. During her career, she has worked with Johnny Griffin, Michel Legrand, Clark Terry and the Pasadena Roof Orchestra and considers Julie London one of her influences. She has sung in English, Chinese, French, Portuguese, and Spanish.

== Discography ==
- Introducing (Mercury, 1991)
- Bewitched (Verve Forecast, 1992)
- The Lady Wants to Know (Verve Forecast, 1994)
- Turn Out the Lamplight (Mercury, 1995)
- Watch What Happens When Laura Fygi Meets Michel Legrand (Philips, 1997)
- Live (Mercury, 1998)
- Dream Your Dream (Mercury, 1998)
- Laura Fygi's Tunes of Passion (Z Music, 1999)
- The Latin Touch (Mercury, 2000)
- Change (Mercury, 2001)
- Laura Fygi at Ronnie Scott's (Verve, 2003)
- The Christmas Album: The Very Best Time of Year (Verve, 2004)
- Rendez-Vous (Universal/Verve, 2007)
- The Best Is Yet to Come (T2/Out of the Blue, 2011)
- Flower (Starsing/Gold Typhoon, 2012)
- Jazz Love (Universal, 2016)
- Laura Goes East (2021)
