= Maya Lavelle =

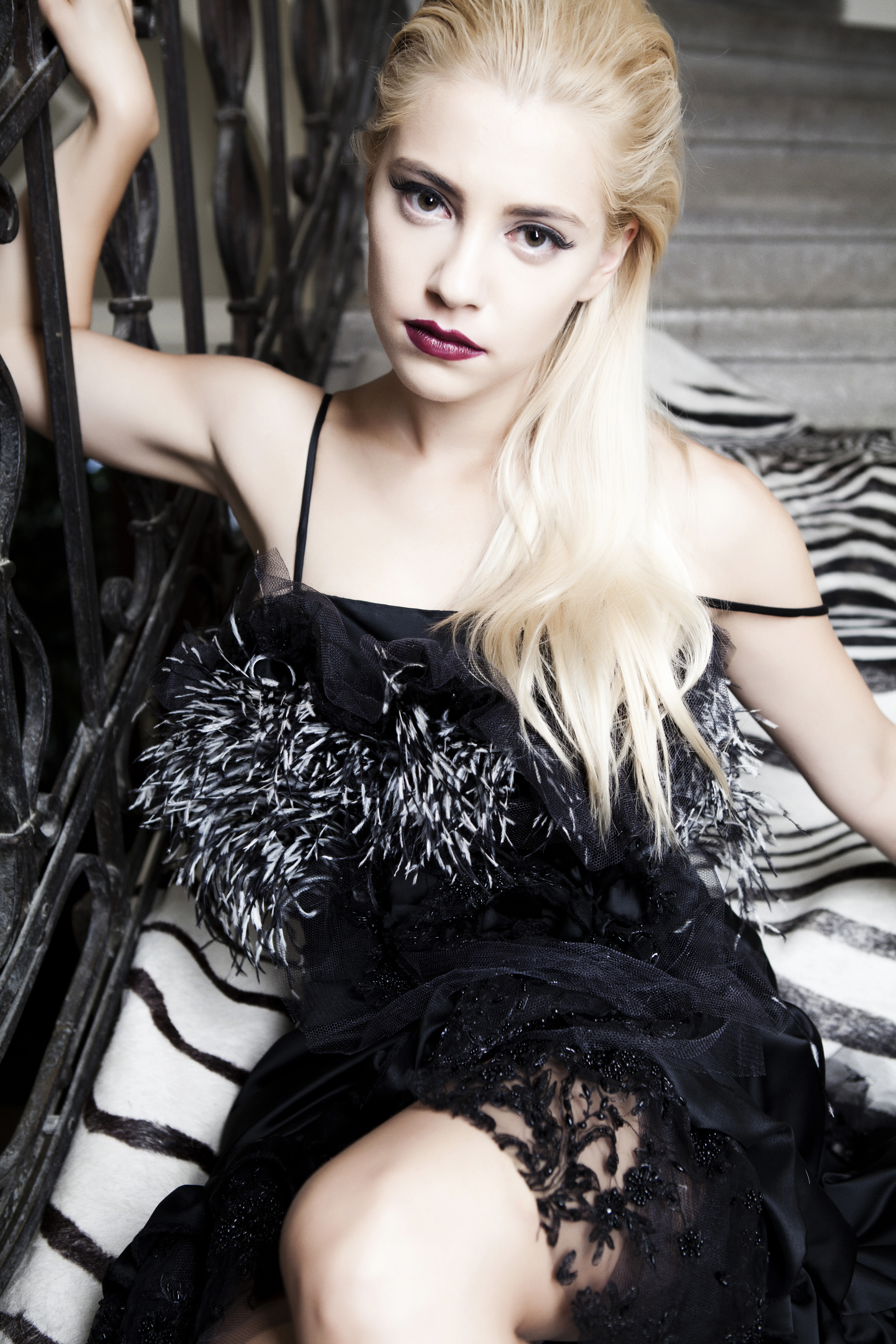

Background information
- Genres: Electropop; cinematic pop; pop; dream pop; synth-pop; electronic; indie pop; art pop; electronica
- Occupations: Singer; songwriter; composer; producer
- Instruments: Vocals; piano; synthesizer
- Label: Maya Lavelle
- Website: mayalavelle.com

Maya Lavelle is an international singer-songwriter, composer, record producer and music video producer. She grew up in Amsterdam, The Netherlands, was born in Belgrade, Serbia and currently resides in London, United Kingdom.

== Career ==
She reached number 1 on the Netherlands iTunes charts with three of her songs and peaked at number 27 in the UK Singles Chart. Her debut single "This Ain't the End" was aired on MTV, and was sync and licensed as a film soundtrack. It tantalised fans of The Walking Dead by being linked to giving a clue as to who Negan would kill in the final episode of season 6.

She followed this up with the song "My Summer", for which she was executive producer and art director of the music video. Then came "The Amazon", an ecological call to the preservation of the Amazon rainforest. For this she used sound recordings she made of crickets and birds in Brazil. A similar theme continued with her metaphorically titled song "Zombietown" which is set in a post-apocalyptic future caused by the negligence of the human race towards climate change.

Her first chart success came with the release of her song titled "Ben" which was featured on BBC Introducing and reached number 1 on the iTunes Top charts in the Netherlands on 19 December 2017. The release of "House on a Rocky Road" cemented her success with another number 1 hit on the Netherlands iTunes charts, whilst this time breaking into the UK top 40 causing Clash Music to call her a "pop icon-in-waiting" with the premiere of her follow up single "Dancing with a Bottle", her third number 1 hit in the Netherlands and her second UK top 40 hit.

She is an independent artist with her own label.

== Early life and artistry ==
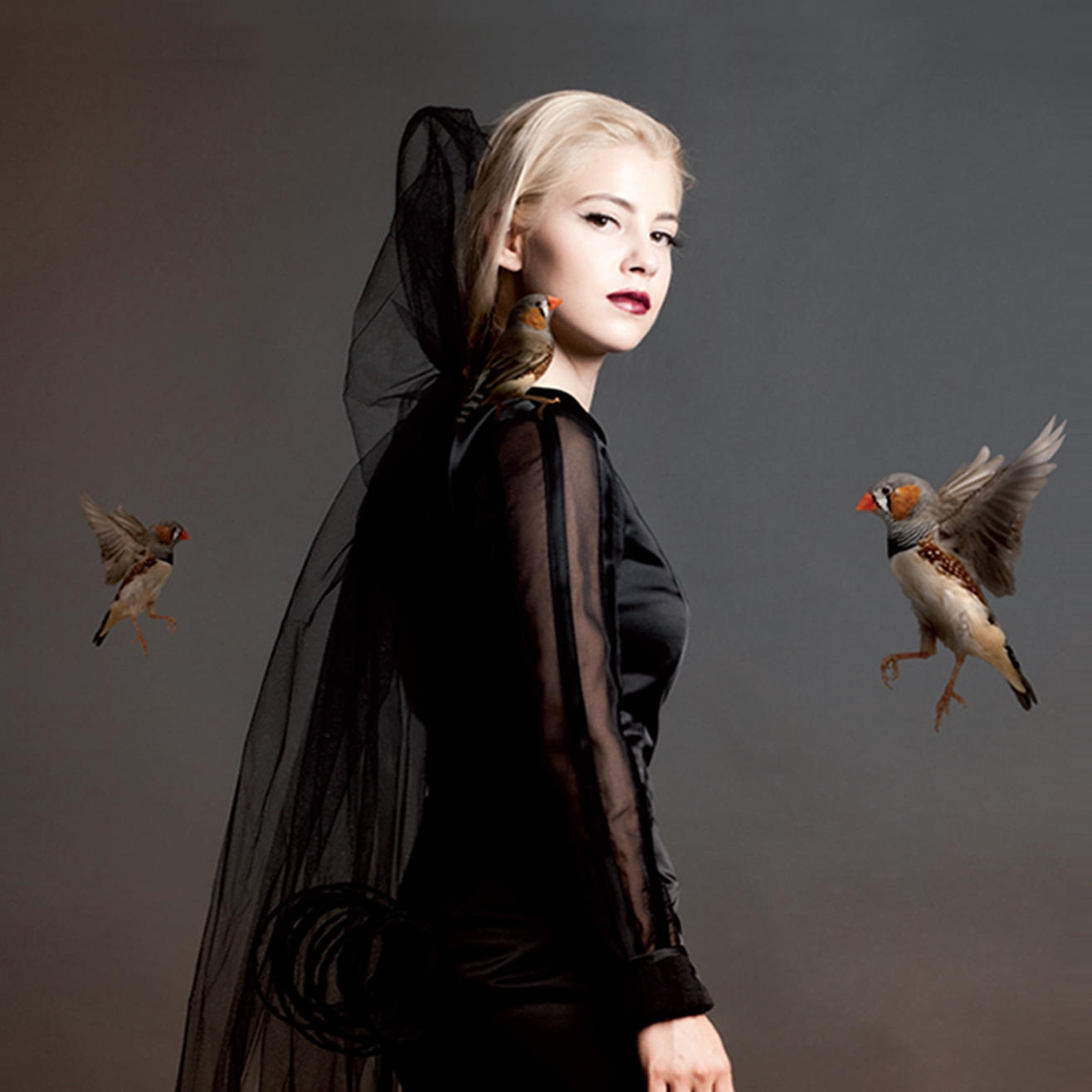
Photo from her debut single "This Ain't the End"

From a young age, Lavelle composed music for films. As a classically trained composer, she won prizes such as for "Best Piece" in the Young Composers Meeting competition in Appeldoorn, Netherlands. She was chosen to represent Netherlands for the Berlin International Film Festival in the Berlinale Talent Campus as a film composer.

Lavelle cites her influences as pop, electronic and classical music. For writing her music, she has mainly been inspired through cinema and literature. Aesthetically, Tim Burton has been a large influence on her music. She cites her music to twist reality and allow the audience to see the world from a different perspective – a fantasy world with special places and remarkable characters. She has a master's degree in advanced composition and orchestration at the Conservatorium van Amsterdam. Early in her career, she self funded herself through scoring for film and theater, teaching piano, and as an artist for MEMO to stimulate cognitive development in children through music.

When she was a child, she was diagnosed with synesthesia, not only with the form of synesthesia called chromesthesia but also the less common visual to auditory synesthesia.

Lavelle creates the arrangements for her music herself – scoring for live instruments and producing electronic sounds with Logic. She plays her music with a custom made electronic sculpture called "Lavellius".

== Discography ==
- "This Ain't the End"
- "My Summer"
- "The Amazon"
- "Zombietown"
- "Ben"
- "Dancing with a Bottle"
- "House on a Rocky Road"
- "Alberto"
- "HOBO"
