= Erna Spoorenberg =

Dutch soprano

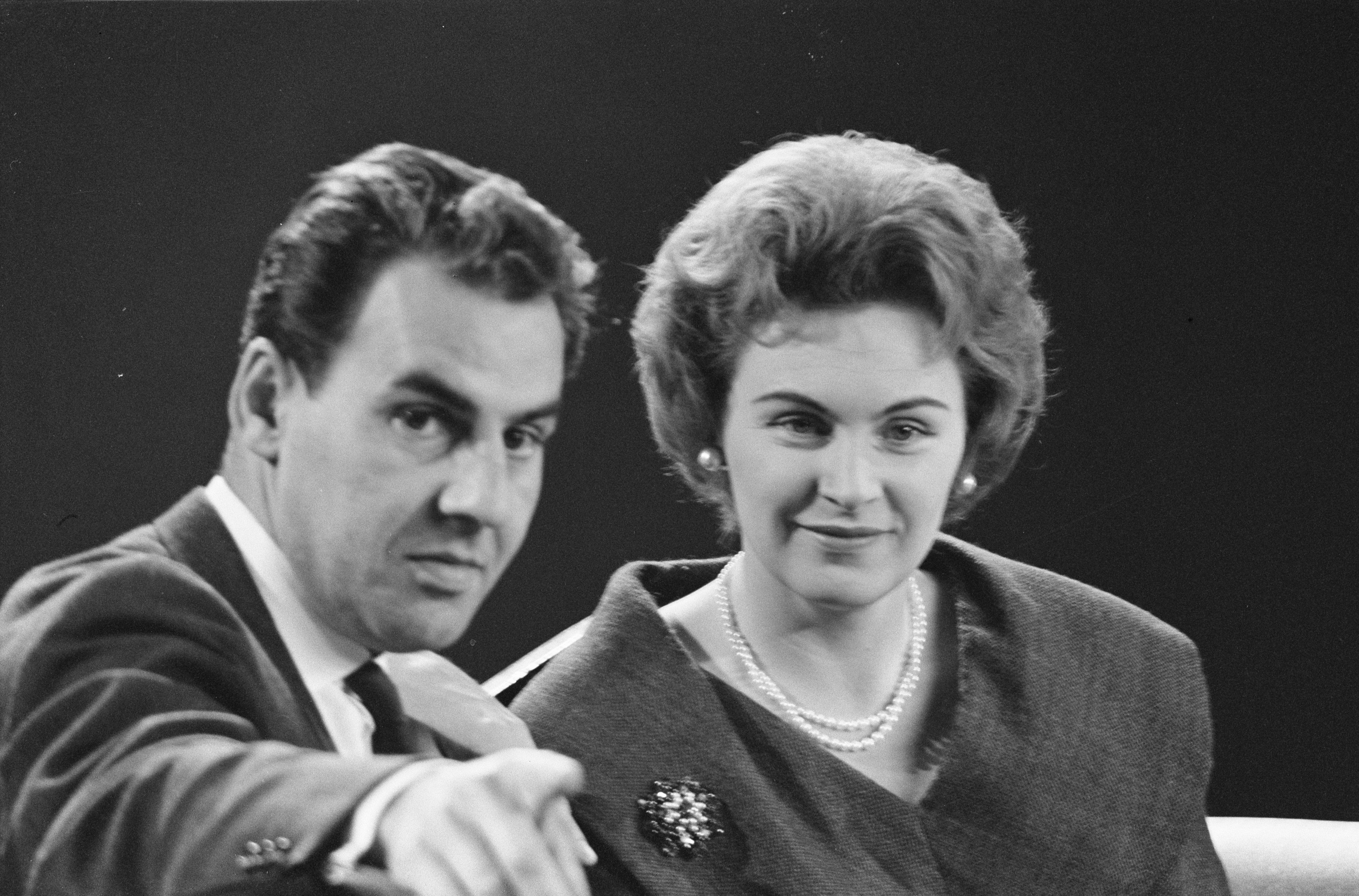
Erna Spoorenberg with Willem Duys in 1961

Erna Spoorenberg, Huberdina Aletta Spoorenberg as real name, (11 April 1926 – 18 March 2004) was a Dutch soprano.

== Life ==
She was born in Yogyakarta, Java, Dutch East Indies (now Indonesia). As a child, she studied the violin and singing. At the age of 14, she studied under Isa Neuhaus, a singer with the Düsseldorf Opera (who was later transported and killed by the Nazis). Spoorenberg then studied singing under Aaltje Noordewier until she was 17, whilst continuing her violin lessons under Julius Röntgen. At the conservatory, she decided to pursue singing in preference to the violin. In 1947, she made her debut on Radio Hilversum, singing Mozart's motet Exsultate, jubilate.

In 1949, she auditioned for Karl Böhm and was given a guest contract at the Vienna State Opera, soon becoming a permanent member. Her performances there included:

- Donizetti: Don Pasquale (Norina)
- Millöcker: Der Bettelstudent (Laura)
- Mozart: The Magic Flute (Pamina / Queen of the Night), Die Entführung aus dem Serail (Konstanze), Le nozze di Figaro, Don Giovanni (Donna Elvira), Così fan tutte (Fiordiligi)
- Nicolai: Die lustigen Weiber von Windsor (Frau Fluth)
- Offenbach: The Tales of Hoffmann
- Johann Strauss II: Die Fledermaus (Adele)
- Richard Strauss: Elektra
- Verdi: Rigoletto (Gilda)

Returning to the Netherlands, she was eventually offered a contract with De Nederlandse Opera for 25 performances per season. Her debut on 15 September 1955 was as Violetta in La traviata. Her insecure position there entailed that she had to work abroad for opera roles. She performed in Hamburg and Berlin and concert tours throughout Europe. In 1963 and 1965, she toured the Soviet Union, appearing at the Kirov and the Bolshoi Theatre. In 1968, she debuted in the United States.

In parallel to her opera career, she gave many recitals, often with Géza Frid, and also as a soloist. In a 1957 recording of Bach's St Matthew Passion with De Nederlandse Bachvereniging, conducted by Anthon van der Horst, she was the soprano soloist. On 16 April 1970, she made her final appearance at De Nederlandse Opera as Konstanze in Die Entführung aus dem Serail.

In the early 1970s, Spoorenberg was injured in a car accident, in which her rib cage was crushed. After six months in hospital, she trained intensively to restore her breathing technique. The accident influenced her decision to work closer to home and she became mainly a singing teacher. From 1970 to 1977, she taught at the Royal Academy in Brussels, and from 1971 to 1988 in the Sweelinck Academy of Music in Amsterdam. After 1978, she worked as a private teacher.

== Awards ==
- A Harriet Cohen International Music Award (year not determined)
- 2002: Commander of the Order of Orange-Nassau

== Death ==
In later life she settled in the town of Vught, where she died in 2004, aged 78.

== Recordings ==
Her more than 20 recordings include:

- The Art of Erna Spoorenberg in Opera Gala GL 100.570
- Erna Spoorenberg: Legendary Voices Decca 466 985-2
- Leona Mitchell and Erna Spoorenberg - Italian Arias and Sacred Songs Works by Giacomo Puccini; Pietro Mascagni; Gioachino Rossini; Giuseppe Verdi; Wolfgang Amadeus Mozart Belart 461
- Les pêcheurs de perles by Bizet. Role: Leila. Verona 2707-8
- La dame blanche by François-Adrien Boieldieu. Role: Anna. Melodram
- Roméo et Juliette by Gounod. Role: Juliette. G.O.P.
- Pelléas et Mélisande by Debussy. Role: Mélisande. Decca 473351-2
- Solveig's Song in Grieg's Peer Gynt - The Hague Philharmonic, directed by Willem Van Otterloo. Philips (Minigroove 33 1/3), 1958
