= Justine Pelmelay =

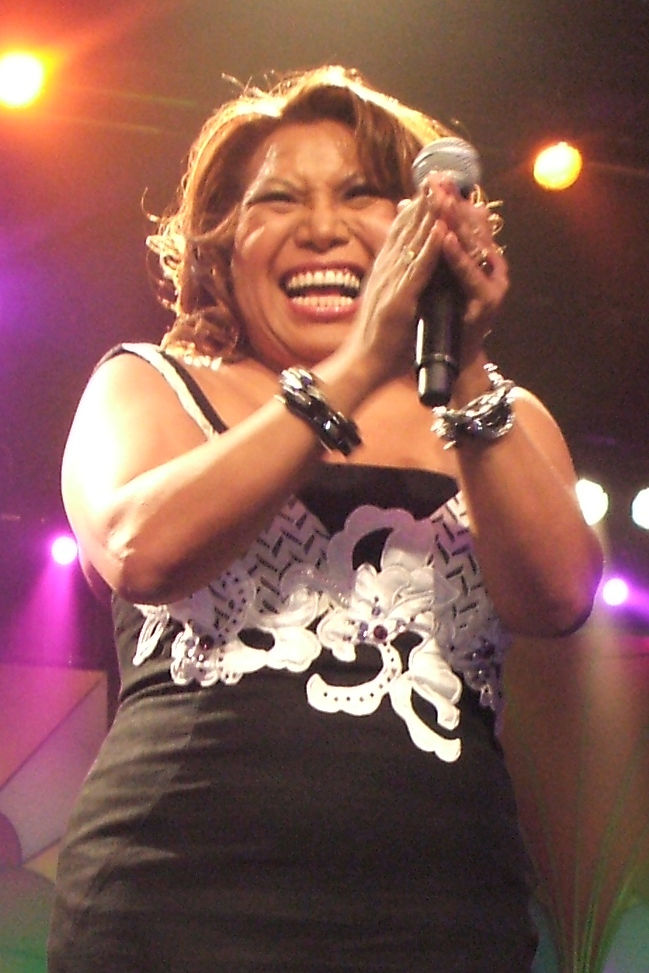
- Justine Pelmelay in 2011

Background information
- Born: 24 September 1958 (age 66); Leiden, Netherlands
- Origin: Leiden, Netherlands
- Occupation: Singer

Justine Pelmelay (born 24 September 1958) is a Dutch singer who represented the Netherlands in the Eurovision Song Contest in 1989. Her entry, "Blijf zoals je bent" (Stay the way you are) was placed fifteenth out of the 22 participating songs.

Pelmelay made another attempt to go to Eurovision in 2005 with the song "What you see is what you get" but it did not qualify for the final of Nationaal Songfestival, Dutch National Selection for Eurovision.

Pelmelay was in the Costa Concordia when it was involved in the disaster which happened on 14 January 2012.

Awards and achievements
Preceded by Gerard Joling with "Shangri-La"	Netherlands in the Eurovision Song Contest; 1989	Succeeded by Maywood with "Ik wil alles met je delen"
