= Xander (Dutch singer) =

Dutch singer

- Born: Xander Venema; 27 August 1985 (age 40)
- Origin: Rotterdam, Netherlands
- Genres: Pop
- Occupation: Singer
- Instrument: Vocals
- Years active: 2006–present
- Formerly of: 4 AM

Xander Venema (born 27 August 1985 in Nieuw-Amsterdam, Netherlands), performing under his mononym Xander, is a Dutch singer, songwriter who was part of the Dutch boyband 4 AM. He took part in Dutch series 2 of Popstars finishing 11th. After Popstars, he has continued with a solo musical career.

== Beginnings ==
Coming from a musical family, where almost every family member sing or play a musical instrument. At age six he started playing keyboards when he was eight he started singing and composing songs and learnt playing the piano. He also studied Media and Entertainment. Around the age of 16 he made a demo, signed a music deal with Willem van Kooten and Eelco van Cooten and released an independent single.

== In boyband 4 am ==
In 2006, he auditioned for the Amsterdam-based Dutch boy band 4 AM and became a member. 4 AM was composed of Koen, Jeff and Daan besides Xander. Xander and 4 am had a minor hit with the Las Vegas-themed "Wake Up Call" that reached No. 24 in the MegaTop 100 followed by "Livin' on Love" The band also appeared on the Hummertime, a Dutch television reality show on Jetix television.

== Popstars Netherlands ==
In 2008, he auditioned unsuccessfully in the Netherlands to the first season of the Dutch version of Popstars.

In 2009, he applied for a second time to season 2 (2009–2010) of the competition where he sang "Arms of s Woman" from Amos Lee. Known as Xander, he was picked as one of the Final 14. He sang "Built to Last" from Mêlée in week 1, "Patience" from Take That in week 2 and was eliminated from competition on 5 December 2009 finishing 11th overall, after singing "Patience" once again and "I Can't Stop Loving You" from Leo Sayer / Phil Collins in a sing-off with the contestants Joshua Newton and Dewi Pechler.

== After Popstars ==
Xander has continued a solo career after Popstar. He performs usually at the Lef gay club in Rotterdam, Netherlands. He sings in English, Dutch, Spanish and Italian.

== Discography ==
=== Singles ===
with 4 AM

Year	Single	NL	Album	Notes
2005	"Wake Up Call"	24	Non-album release	
2006	"Livin' on Love"	-	Non-album release	

Solo (own compositions)

- 2010: "Miss U" / "Voor jou" / "Anders dan toen"
- 2011: "I'm Your Man" / "I Believe in You and I"
