= Monica Verschoor =

Dutch pop singer and pianist

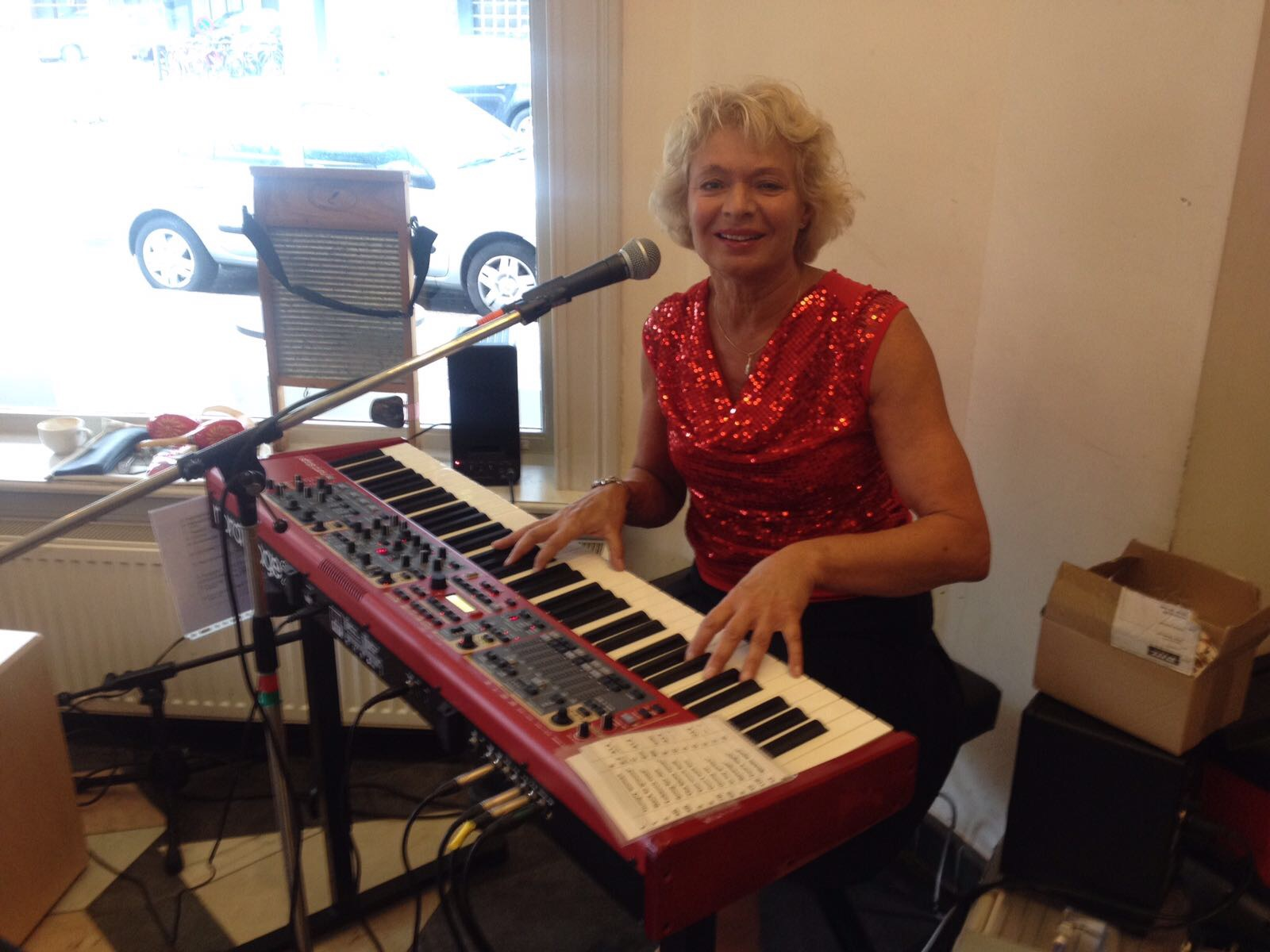
- Born: October 8, 1950 (age 75); The Hague, the Netherlands

Monica Adella Verschoor (born 18 October 1950, in The Hague) is a pop singer and pianist. When her songs ranked number 1 in the Dutch top 40, Monica became a famous singer in the 1970s .

== Biography ==
Monica Verschoor was born in The Hague. Her mother from the former Dutch East Indies married in the Netherlands Jan Verschoor, French teacher. During 10 years, she had piano lessons from Mrs. Tilly Talboom Smits, founder of the Hofstads Youth Orchestra. Later, on the advice of Mrs. Talbert, she played as double bass player for several years in this orchestra. Studying Dutch in Leiden, she obtained a teaching certificate.

In 1971, with the band Monica and the voice of freedom hit the number 1 of the Dutch top 40 with the single Empty words release by Imperial Records in the Netherlands, Columbia Records in Germany, Transatlantic Records in United Kingdom, and also in 1972 with Oscar Benton with the single All I ever need is you or Everybody is telling me] released by Imperial Records.

Later, she became both a teacher and a performing artist in all the Netherlands. She is currently an active composer, pianist and vocalist, Her last project is an educational show for children wij gaan op reis with Guillaume Marcenac.

== Discography ==
=== Singles ===
Year	Title	Label	Reference
1971	Empty words / Crying for love	Imperial Records	5C 006-24 447
1971	Empty words / Crying for love	EMI	2C 006-24 447 M
1971	Empty words / Crying for love	Columbia Records	1 C 006-24 447
1971	Empty words / Crying for love	Odeon Records	1 J 006-24 447
1972	Paula / Springtime	Imperial Records	5C 006-24 605
1972	All I ever need is you / Sing along sing along	Imperial Records	4C 006-24 476
1972	All I ever need is you / Sing along sing along	Imperial Records	5C 006-24 476
1972	Was ich brauche das bist du / Danke schön bitte schön	Columbia Records	1 C 006-24 484 U
1972	Everybody is telling me / Were you there?	Imperial Records	5C 006-24 627
1972	Everybody is telling me / Were you there?	Columbia Records	1C 006-24 627
1972	Everybody is telling me / Were you there?	Carrere Records	49 037
1973	What I wanna do / Stay another night	EMI	5C 006-24 876
1973	Mama don't you worry / Never trust a woman	Imperial Records	5C 006-24 809
1974	My children- my wife/ My first band	Imperial Records	5C 006-25 005
1981	All I ever need is you / Everybody is telling me	Imperial Records	5C 006-24 476
1981	All I ever need is you / Everybody is telling me	Imperial Records	4C 006-24 476

=== Albums / collector-LP's ===
Year	Title	Label	Reference
1972	Top picks	Imperial Records	5C 052-24 521
1972	Met volle kracht-de eerste hits van Veronica 538	Columbia Records	5C 048.24 538
1972	20 Original hits, 20 original artists	EMI	5C 052.24 920
1972	Summer hits, original hitversions vol.1	Columbia Records	5C 048-24700

=== CD’s ===
Year	Title	Label	Reference
1988	Exclusive Love Duets	Ariola Records	259.065
1997	De jaren ’70, vol 3 1972	EVA Records	74321-419902
1994	The real hits, 14 original hitrecordings	EMI	7243 83066322
2005	Nederpop volume 2	Universal Music Group	0602498275665
2008	50 jaar Nederpop, rare & obscure, samengesteld door Leon Blokhuis	Universal Music Group	0602517851573

== Literature ==
Year	Title	Editor	Reference
2001	Top 40 Hitdossier		ISBN 9789025733490
2001	Oor's Eerste Nederlandse Pop Encyclopedie	Oor	ISBN 9789045304618
