= Aaltje Noordewier–Reddingius =

Dutch classical soprano

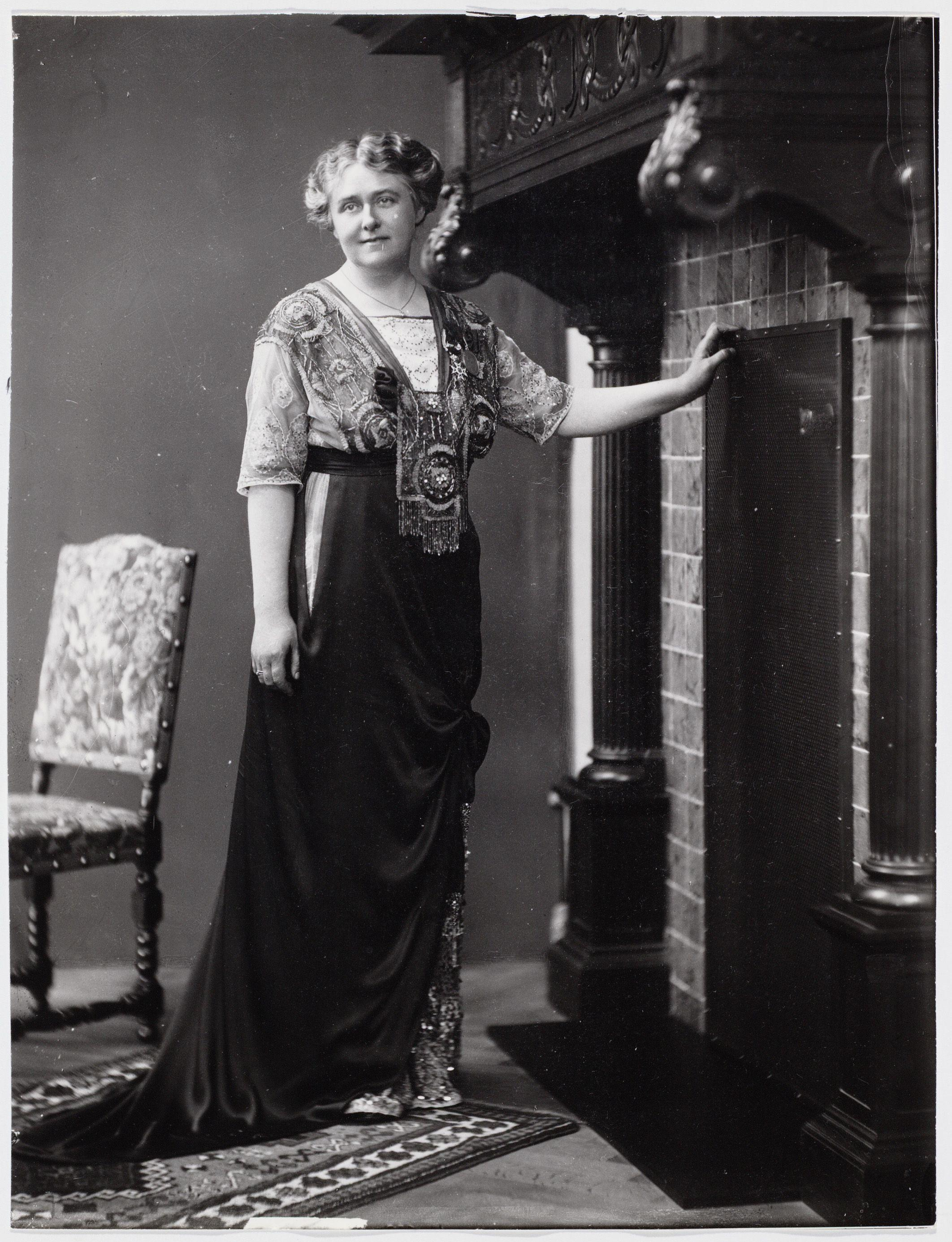
Aaltje Noordewier in the 1920s

Aaltje Noordewier–Reddingius (née Reddingius; 1 September 1868, Deurne – 6 April 1949) was a Dutch classical soprano who had an active performance career in the concert repertoire from 1888 through the 1930s. She was also a celebrated voice teacher.

From 1886 to 1890, she studied at the Conservatorium van Amsterdam. In 1893, she married painter Michiel Noordewier. She was a mentor to singers such as Aafje Heynis, Erna Spoorenberg and Laurens Bogtman.

== Legacy ==
Main-belt asteroid 677 Aaltje, discovered by August Kopff at Heidelberg Observatory in 1909, was named in her honour.

== See also ==
- Erna Spoorenberg
