= Miggy (singer) =

Dutch pop singer

Marina van der Rijk
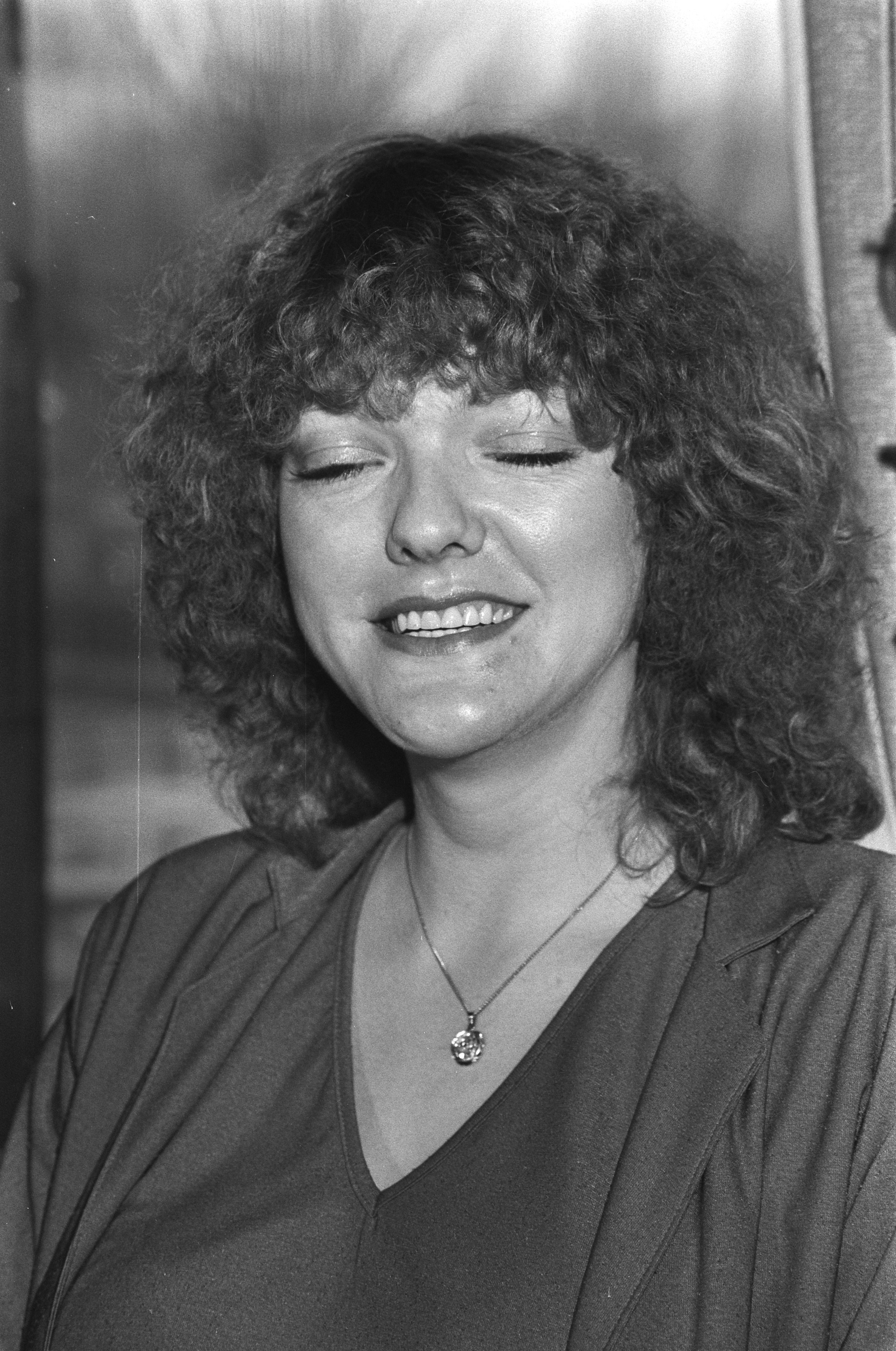
- Miggy in 1981

Background information
- Born: 31 October 1961; Breda, Netherlands
- Died: 7 September 2012 (aged 50) Geleen, Netherlands

Marina van der Rijk (31 October 1961 – 7 November 2012), known as Miggy, was a Dutch pop singer of the 1980s. She was born in Breda and died in Geleen. Her only hit was the novelty song 'Annie, which released in 1981.
