= Netherlands in the Eurovision Song Contest 1992 =

- Eurovision Song Contest 1992
- Participating broadcaster: Nederlandse Omroep Stichting (NOS)
- Country: Netherlands
- Selection process: Nationaal Songfestival 1992
- Selection date: 29 March 1992

Competing entry
- Song: "Wijs me de weg"
- Artist: Humphrey Campbell
- Songwriter: Edwin Schimscheimer

Placement
- Final result: 9th, 67 points

Participation chronology

The Netherlands was represented at the Eurovision Song Contest 1992 with the song "Wijs me de weg", written by Edwin Schimscheimer, and performed by Humphrey Campbell. The Dutch participating broadcaster, Nederlandse Omroep Stichting (NOS), selected its entry for the contest through a national final.

== Before Eurovision ==
=== Nationaal Songfestival 1992 ===
Nederlandse Omroep Stichting (NOS), the Dutch national broadcaster, continued to host a national final to select its entry for the Eurovision Song Contest 1992, held in Malmö, Sweden. Nationaal Songfestival 1992 was held at the NOS TV studios in Hilversum on 29 March 1992, hosted by Bas Westerweel. The winner was chosen by the votes of 12 regional juries, which was Humphrey Campbell with the song "Wijs me de weg", composed by Edwin Schimscheimer.

Final – 29 March 1992
R/O	Singer	Song	Songwriter(s)	Points	Place
1	Justian	"De schok van mijn leven"	Ellert Driessen, Peter Schön	75	5
2	Laura Vlasblom	"Gouden bergen"	Henk Temming, Paula Patricio	88	2
3	Ferry van Leeuwen	"Een klassieke liefde"	Marcel Schimscheimer, John van Katwijk	56	7
4	Tony Neef and Hella Koffeman	"Nooit geweten"	Maarten Peeters	61	6
5	Rob Janszen	"Net als een kind"	Henk Hofstede	85	3
6	Fantasyx	"Met mij gaat het goed"	Marcel Schimscheimer, Cees Stolk	42	9
7	Lisa Boray	"Hartstocht"	Edwin Schimscheimer, Lisa Boray	81	4
8	Bob van Niekerk	"Waar is het feest"	Maarten Peeters	44	8
9	Sigi	"Wachten op water"	Piet Souer	34	10
10	Humphrey Campbell	"Wijs me de weg"	Edwin Schimscheimer	94	1

Detailed Regional Jury Votes
R/O	Song	Groningen	North Brabant	Utrecht	Flevoland	North Holland	Gelderland	Drenthe	South Holland	Zeeland	Overijssel	Limburg	Friesland	Total
1	"De schok van mijn leven"	5	7	7	8	8	3	9	5	5	5	10	3	75
2	"Gouden bergen"	8	9	8	9	9	8	7	4	7	4	9	6	88
3	"Een klassieke liefde"	6	3	4	7	4	6	1	7	2	3	6	7	56
4	"Nooit geweten"	3	5	5	5	7	7	6	1	3	6	8	5	61
5	"Net als een kind"	10	2	6	10	6	9	3	9	10	10	1	9	85
6	"Met mij gaat het goed"	1	8	2	4	3	4	4	3	1	7	4	1	42
7	"Hartstocht"	9	6	10	2	2	2	10	10	6	9	5	10	81
8	"Waar is het feest"	4	1	3	1	5	5	8	6	4	2	3	2	44
9	"Wachten op water"	2	4	1	3	1	1	5	2	8	1	2	4	34
10	"Wijs me de weg"	7	10	9	6	10	10	2	8	9	8	7	8	94

== At Eurovision ==
Campbell performed 23rd (last) on the night of the contest, following Germany. "Wijs me de weg" came 9th of 23, receiving 67 points.

The Dutch conductor at the contest was Harry van Hoof.

=== Voting ===
Points awarded to the Netherlands
Score	Country
12 points	
10 points	
8 points	Ireland
7 points	Cyprus; Germany; Spain; Turkey
6 points	
5 points	Austria; Greece; Israel
4 points	France; Norway
3 points	Iceland
2 points	Belgium; United Kingdom
1 point	Switzerland

Points awarded by the Netherlands
Score	Country
12 points	Italy
10 points	Ireland
8 points	Cyprus
7 points	United Kingdom
6 points	France
5 points	Malta
4 points	Greece
3 points	Israel
2 points	Iceland
1 point	Spain
