= Driekes Hoekstra =

Driekes Hoekstra is a folk singer from Breda, Netherlands. On 6 March 2015, he won the finale of the talent show Bloed, Zweet en Tranen ("Blood, Sweat, and Tears") on the Dutch television station SBS6.
