= Denise Jannah =

Dutch jazz singer

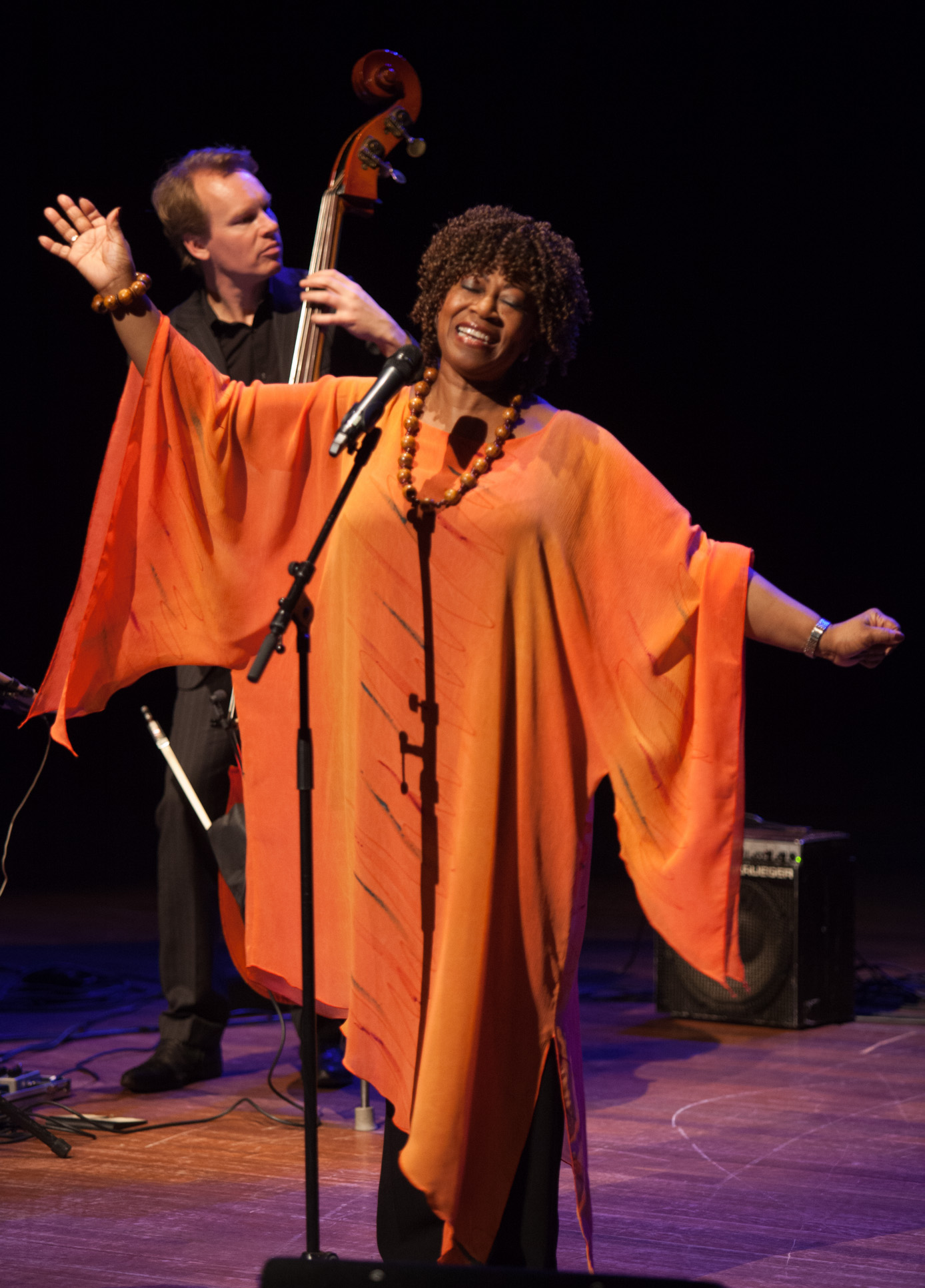
- Denise Jannah in 2019

Background information
- Born: Denise Johanna Zeefuik; 7 November 1956 (age 69); Paramaribo, Suriname
- Genres: Jazz
- Occupation: Singer

Denise Johanna Zeefuik (born 7 November 1956) is a Dutch jazz singer. She made her debut at the North Sea Jazz Festival in 1991. Two years later she won her first of two Edison Music Awards with her second album "A Heart Full of Music" (1993). She was the first Dutch jazz soloist to be signed by Blue Note Records. In 1996 a documentary was made named "Denise Jannah, new lady in jazz".

== Early life ==
She spent her childhood in Suriname and the Netherlands as the eldest daughter of four from the well known Surinamese pastor Rev. Karel Zeefuik.

=== Education ===
Denise studied law at the University of Utrecht. However, her interest in music tempted her to enroll herself into the Conservatorium van Amsterdam. She graduated the university as a vocal educator.

== Discography ==
Studio albums

- Take It from the Top (Timeless, 1991)
- A Heart Full of Music (Timeless, 1993)
- I Was Born in Love with You (Blue Note, 1995)
- Different Colours (EMI, 1996)
- The Madness of Our Love (Blue Note, 1999)
- Thirst! (BV Haast, 2000)
- Gedicht Gezongen (Plattel Music, 2004)
- El Sendero (Maxanter, 2005)
- Ella!: Denise Jannah Sings Ella Fitzgerald (September 2015)
- Lost & Found (Rhapsody Analog, 2017)
