= List of Ayreon guest musicians =

This is a list of musicians who have contributed to the Arjen Anthony Lucassen's rock opera project known as Ayreon.

== Vocals ==
Vocalist	The Final Experiment	The Final Experiment (Bonus disc)	Actual Fantasy	Into the Electric Castle	The Dream Sequencer	Flight of the Migrator	Ayreonauts Only	The Human Equation	01011001	Elected	Timeline	The Theory of Everything	The Theater Equation	The Source	Ayreon Universe	Electric Castle Live and Other Tales	Transitus	01011001 – Live Beneath the Waves	Total
Amanda Somerville HDK, Kiske/Somerville																	☒		1
Andi Deris Helloween						☒													1
Anneke van Giersbergen ex-The Gathering, Agua de Annique				☒					☒				☒		☒	☒		☒	6
Astrid van der Veen Ambeon		☒					☒												2
Barry Hay Golden Earring	☒																		1
Bob Catley Magnum, ex-Hard Rain									☒										1
Brittney Slayes Unleash the Archers																		☒	1
Bruce Dickinson Iron Maiden, ex-Samson						☒													1
Cammie Gilbert Oceans of Slumber																	☒		1
Caroline Westendorp The Charm the Fury																	☒		1
Cristina Scabbia Lacuna Coil												☒							1
Damian Wilson ex-Rick Wakeman, Threshold (UK), Landmarq, Headspace				☒	☒	☒	☒								☒	☒		☒	7
Daniel Gildenlöw Pain of Salvation									☒									☒	2
Debby Schreuder	☒																		1
Dee Snider ex-Twisted Sister																	☒		1
Devin Townsend Strapping Young Lad, The Devin Townsend Band								☒											1
Devon Graves Deadsoul Tribe, ex-Psychotic Waltz								☒					☒						2
Dianne van Giersbergen Ex Libris																☒	☒		2
Edward Reekers ex-Kayak	☒		☒	☒	☒										☒	☒			6
Edwin Balogh ex-Omega				☒												☒			2
Eric Clayton Saviour Machine								☒					☒						2
Esther Ladiges		☒																	1
Fabio Lione Vision Divine, Rhapsody of Fire						☒													1
Fish ex-Marillion				☒												☒			2
Floor Jansen After Forever, ReVamp, Nightwish					☒				☒					☒	☒				4
Gary Hughes Ten							☒												1
George Oosthoek Orphanage, Kutschurft				☒												☒			2
Hansi Kürsch Blind Guardian, Demons & Wizards									☒					☒	☒			☒	4
Heather Findlay Mostly Autumn								☒					☒						2
Ian Parry Elegy	☒					☒	☒												3
Irene Jansen ex-Karma		☒						☒					☒		☒			☒	5
Jacqueline Govaert Krezip					☒														1
James LaBrie Dream Theater								☒					☒	☒					3
Janne JB Christoffersson Grand Magus												☒							1
Jan-Chris de Koeijer Gorefest	☒																		1
Jan Willem Ketelaers																☒	☒	☒	3
Jasper Steverlinck Arid											☒								1
Jay van Feggelen ex-Bodine	☒			☒											☒				3
Johan Edlund Tiamat, Lucyfire					☒														1
Johanne James Threshold, Kyrbgrinder																	☒		1
John "Jaycee" Cuijpers Praying Mantis		☒													☒	☒		☒	4
John Wetton Asia, ex-King Crimson												☒							1
Jonas Renkse Katatonia									☒						☒			☒	3
Jørn Lande Jorn, ex-Masterplan, ex-Ark, Vagabond, etc.									☒										1
Lana Lane					☒	☒	☒												3
Lenny Wolf Kingdom Come	☒																		1
Leon Goewie Vengeance	☒						☒												2
Liselotte Hegt Dial									☒									☒	2
Lisette van den Berg Scarlet Stories			Scarlet Stories										☒	☒	☒		☒		4
Lucie Hillen	☒																		1
Magali Luyten Beautiful Sin, Virus IV									☒						☒			☒	3
Magnus Ekwall The Quill								☒					☒						2
Marcela Bovio Elfonía, Stream of Passion, MaYaN		☒						☒					☒		☒	☒	☒	☒	7
Marjan Welman Elister, Autumn									☒									☒	2
Mark Jansen Epica																☒			1
Mark McCrite Rocket Scientists					☒														1
Marko Hietala Nightwish, Tarot												☒			☒				2
Michael Eriksen Circus Maximus														☒					1
Michael "Mike" Mills Toehider												☒	☒	☒	☒		☒	☒	6
Mikael Åkerfeldt Opeth, Bloodbath (Swe)								☒											1
Mike Baker Shadow Gallery								☒											1
Mirjam van Doorn	☒																		1
Mouse Tuesday Child					☒		☒												2
Neal Morse ex-Spock's Beard, Transatlantic					☒														1
Nils K. Rue Pagan's Mind														☒					1
Okkie Huysdens			☒																1
Paul Manzi ex-Arena																	☒		1
Peter Daltrey ex-Kaleidoscope		☒		☒															2
Phideaux Xavier									☒									☒	2
Ralf Scheepers Primal Fear, ex-Gamma Ray						☒													1
Robby Valentine Valentine		☒														☒			2
Robert Soeterboek Wicked Sensation	☒		☒			☒	☒								☒	☒			6
Robert Westerholt Within Temptation				☒															1
Rodney Blaze		☒																	1
Russell Allen Symphony X, Adrenaline Mob						☒								☒					2
Ruud Houweling Cloudmachine	☒	☒																	2
Sara Squadrani Ancient Bards												☒							1
Sharon den Adel Within Temptation				☒															1
Simone Simons Epica									☒					☒		☒	☒	☒	5
Steve Lee Gotthard									☒										1
Timo Kotipelto Stratovarius, Kotipelto						☒													1
Tobias Sammet Edguy, Avantasia										☒				☒					2
Tom S. Englund Evergrey									☒									☒	2
Tommy Giles Rogers Between the Buried and Me														☒					1
Tommy Karevik Kamelot, Seventh Wonder												☒		☒	☒		☒		4
Ty Tabor King's X, Platypus, The Jelly Jam									☒										1
Wilmer Waarbroek												☒		☒			☒		3
Wudstik									☒				☒					☒	3
Zaher Zorgati Myrath														☒					1

== Bass ==
- Armand van der Hoff (ex-Bodine)
- Jan Bijlsma (ex-Vengeance)
- Jolanda Verduijn
- Peter Vink (ex-Finch)
- Rheno Xeros (ex-Bodine)
- Walter Latupeirissa (Snowy White)
- Johan van Stratum (Stream of Passion, Vuur)

== Cello ==
- Dewi Kerstens
- Marieke van der Heyden
- Taco Kooistra
- Maaike Peterse (Kingfisher Sky)
- Jurriaan Westerveld

== Didgeridoo, Treble recorder ==
- Jeroen Goossens

== Drums ==
- Ed Warby (Gorefest)
- Ernst van Ee (Trenody)
- Gerard Haitsma (ex-Bodine)
- John Snels (ex-Vengeance)
- Matt Oligschlager (ex-Vengeance)
- Rob Snijders (ex-Celestial Season, Agua de Annique)
- Stephen van Haestregt (ex-Within Temptation)

== Flute ==
- Barry Hay (Golden Earring)
- Ewa Albering (ex-Quidam)
- Jeroen Goossens (ex-Pater Moeskroen)
- John McManus (Celtus)
- Thijs van Leer (Focus)

== Guitar ==
- Gary Wehrkamp (Shadow Gallery)
- Guthrie Govan (The Aristocrats, ex-Asia)
- Jan Somers (Vengeance)
- Joe Satriani (Chickenfoot)
- Lori Linstruth
- Marcel Coenen (Sun Caged)
- Michael Romeo (Symphony X)
- Oscar Holleman (ex-Vengeance)
- Paul Gilbert (Mr.Big, ex-Racer-X)
- Peer Verschuren (ex-Vengeance)
- Rheno Xeros (ex-Bodine)
- Ruud Houweling (Cloudmachine)
- Steve Hackett (ex-Genesis)
- Timo Somers

== Hurdy-gurdy ==
- Patty Gurdy

== Keyboard / Harpsichord / Piano / Synths / Hammond ==
- Cleem Determeijer (ex-Finch)
- Clive Nolan (Arena)
- Erik Norlander (Rocket Scientists)
- Gary Wehrkamp (Shadow Gallery)
- Derek Sherinian (Planet X, ex-Dream Theater)
- Jordan Rudess (Dream Theater)
- Joost van den Broek (After Forever)
- Keiko Kumagai (Ars Nova)
- Keith Emerson (Emerson, Lake & Palmer)
- Ken Hensley (ex-Uriah Heep, ex-Blackfoot)
- Mark Kelly (Marillion)
- Martin Orford (IQ, Jadis)
- Oliver Wakeman
- René Merkelbach
- Rick Wakeman (ex-Yes)
- Robby Valentine (Valentine)
- Roland Bakker (ex-Vengeance)
- Tomas Bodin (The Flower Kings)
- Ton Scherpenzeel (Kayak)

== Sitar ==
- Jack Pisters

== Violin ==
- Ernö Olah (Metropole Orchestra)
- Pat McManus (Celtus)
- Robert Baba
- Ben Mathot
