= Fate of a Dreamer =

Studio album by Ambeon
- Released: 2001
- Recorded: 2000–2001
- Length: 51:29
- Label: Transmission Records
- Producer: Arjen Lucassen

Arjen Anthony Lucassen chronology
Ayreonauts Only (2000)	Fate of a Dreamer (2001)	Space Metal (2002)

Professional ratings
Review scores
Source	Rating
Allmusic	3/5 stars

Fate of a Dreamer is an album by Dutch singer and musician Arjen Anthony Lucassen under the name Ambeon, released in 2001 by Dutch music label Transmission Records. All of the ten tracks feature samples from and arrangements of Ayreon's songs, as noted below. The album was out of print for years, due to the closing of Transmission. The album was re-released in December 2011 with bonus tracks, and an accompanying acoustic CD covering various Ambeon and Ayreon tracks.

== Track listing ==
All tracks are written by Arjen Anthony Lucassen and Astrid van der Veen.

No.	Title	Length
1.	"Estranged"	2:51
2.	"Ashes"	5:29
3.	"High"	4:15
4.	"Cold Metal"	6:50
5.	"Fate"	7:45
6.	"Sick Ceremony"	3:44
7.	"Lost Message"	4:33
8.	"Surreal"	4:38
9.	"Sweet Little Brother"	6:08
10.	"Dreamer"	5:17

2011 Expanded Edition bonus tracks
No.	Title	Length
11.	"Cold Metal (Single Version)"	3:48
12.	"Merry-Go-Round"	4:45
13.	"High (Remix)"	3:29

2011 Expanded Edition Disc 2: The Unplugged Recordings
No.	Title	Length
1.	"Actual Fantasy"	1:25
2.	"Valley of the Queens"	2:39
3.	"Ashes"	3:15
4.	"Charm of the Seer"	3:29
5.	"Castle Hall"	4:33
6.	"Estranged"	2:49
7.	"Temple of the Cat"	3:32
8.	"Isis and Osiris"	6:09
9.	"High"	3:43
10.	"Garden of Emotions"	4:31
11.	"Sick Ceremony"	3:02
12.	"House on Mars"	5:22
13.	"Lost Message"	3:42
14.	"Into the Black Hole / Cold Metal"	5:10

== Single ==
=== Cold Metal ===
Cold Metal

"Cold Metal" is the only single from this album. It has samples of Ayreon's "Into the Black Hole", from the album Universal Migrator Part 2: Flight of the Migrator.

==== Track listing ====
1. "Cold Metal (Remix Single Version)"
2. "Merry-Go-Round"
3. "High (Remix)"
4. "Cold Metal (Album Version)"

== Personnel ==
- Astrid van der Veen – vocals, background vocals
- Arjen Lucassen – acoustic and electric guitar, keys, samples
- Stephen van Haestregt – acoustic and electronic drums, percussion
- Walter Latupeirissa – bass, fretless bass

=== Guest musicians ===
- John McManus – alto flute, uilleann pipes
- Pat McManus – viola
- Erik Norlander – synthesizers
- Lana Lane – reversed background vocals

== Ayreon's song reference ==
- "Estranged": "Ye Courtyard Minstrel Boy" (from The Final Experiment)
- "Ashes": "Back on Planet Earth" (from Actual Fantasy)
- "High": "The Shooting Company of Captain Frans B. Cocq" (from Universal Migrator Part 1: The Dream Sequencer)
- "Cold Metal": "Into the Black Hole" (from Universal Migrator Part 2: Flight of the Migrator)
- "Fate": "Welcome to the New Dimension" and "Forever of the Stars" (both from Into the Electric Castle)
- "Sick Ceremony": "Magic Ride" (from The Final Experiment)
- "Lost Message": "The Charm of the Seer" (from The Final Experiment) and "Carried by the Wind" (from Universal Migrator Part 1: The Dream Sequencer)
- "Surreal": "And the Druids Turn to Stone" and "Carried by the Wind" (both from Universal Migrator Part 1: The Dream Sequencer)
- "Sweet Little Brother": "2084" (from Universal Migrator Part 1: The Dream Sequencer)
- "Dreamer": "Computer Eyes" (from Actual Fantasy)
- "Merry-Go-Round": "The Dawn of Man" (from Actual Fantasy)
