= Universal Migrator =

Universal Migrator can refer to either one of two albums by progressive metal project Ayreon:

- Universal Migrator Part 1: The Dream Sequencer
- Universal Migrator Part 2: Flight of the Migrator
