= Strange Hobby =

Studio album by Arjen Anthony Lucassen
- Released: 1996
- Genre: Psychedelic rock, rock, folk rock
- Label: Transmission, Cherry Red Records (Re-Release)

Arjen Anthony Lucassen chronology
Actual Fantasy (1996)	Strange Hobby (1996)	Into the Electric Castle (1998)

Strange Hobby is an uncredited cover album by Arjen Anthony Lucassen, released in 1996. The album and the booklet contained no information about Lucassen and did not explain who was responsible for the recordings, to make the album even more "strange".

The album features covers of songs that have influenced Lucassen's musical development, mainly from the 1960s. As he did in his solo album Pools of Sorrow, Waves of Joy, Lucassen performed all the vocals and all the instruments (except drums and synthesizer) and arranged all the songs himself.

The album was re-released on 8 July 2016 with four previously unreleased bonus tracks; this time, Lucassen was officially credited as the artist.

== Track listing ==
No.	Title	Writer(s)	Original artist (date)	Length
1.	"Arnold Layne"	Syd Barrett	Pink Floyd (1967)	2:59
2.	"Norwegian Wood"	John Lennon, Paul McCartney	The Beatles (1965)	2:07
3.	"Pictures of Matchstick Men"	Francis Rossi	Status Quo (1968)	3:10
4.	"I Am a Rock"	Paul Simon	Paul Simon (1965)	2:35
5.	"Boris the Spider"	John Entwistle	The Who (1966)	2:10
6.	"(Further Reflections) In the Room of Percussion"	Eddy Pumer, Peter Daltrey	Kaleidoscope (1967)	3:11
7.	"Sunny Afternoon"	Ray Davies	The Kinks (1966)	3:29
8.	"See Emily Play"	Syd Barrett	Pink Floyd (1967)	2:41
9.	"For No One"	John Lennon, Paul McCartney	The Beatles (1966)	2:02
10.	"I Want You"	Bob Dylan	Bob Dylan (1966)	2:38
11.	"Bus Stop"	Graham Gouldman	The Hollies (1966)	3:05
12.	"Flowers in the Rain"	Roy Wood	The Move (1967)	2:11
13.	"The Letter"	Wayne Carson Thompson	The Box Tops (1967)	2:08
14.	"Ride a White Swan"	Marc Bolan	T. Rex (1970)	2:18
15.	"Sloop John B"	Traditional West Indies (Bahamas) folk song, The Kingston Trio, Brian Wilson	The Beach Boys (1966)	2:55
16.	"Daydream Believer"	John Stewart	The Monkees (1967)	2:42
17.	"Catch the Wind"	Donovan	Donovan (1965)	1:58
18.	"Ice in the Sun"	Marty Wilde, Ronnie Scott	Status Quo (1968)	2:26

2016 reissue and Itunes bonus tracks
No.	Title	Writer(s)	Original artist (date)	Length
19.	"Pretty Girls"	Arjen Anthony Lucassen	original song	2:41
20.	"In the Room of Percussion"	Eddy Pumer, Peter Daltrey	Kaleidoscope (1967)	2:26
21.	"Last Train to Clarksville"	Tommy Boyce, Bobby Hart	The Monkees (1966)	2:27
22.	"Ruby Tuesday"	Mick Jagger, Keith Richards	The Rolling Stones (1967)	2:48

== Commercial reception ==
The album was a commercial loss, partially because Lucassen was not well known at that time (his success really started with Into the Electric Castle). Years later, Arjen stated: "[I]t may not be smart from a commercial point of view, but it was fun".
