= The Theory of Everything (Ayreon album) =

Studio album by Ayreon
- Released: 28 October 2013
- Recorded: June 2012 – August 2013
- Genres: Progressive rock; progressive metal
- Length: 89:33
- Label: Inside Out Music
- Producer: Arjen Lucassen

Ayreon chronology
Timeline (2008)	The Theory of Everything (2013)	The Source (2017)

Arjen Anthony Lucassen chronology
Lost in the New Real (2012)	The Theory of Everything (2013)	The Diary (2015)

The Theory of Everything (stylized as ŦĦΣ ŦĦΣΦɌ¥ ΦƑ ΣVΣɌΨŦĦIΠG) is the eighth studio album from Ayreon, a progressive metal/rock opera project by Dutch musician Arjen Anthony Lucassen, released on 28 October 2013.

As with every Ayreon album, it is a concept album with each character being portrayed by a unique singer; however, it is separate from the science fiction storyline featured in most Ayreon albums, instead acting as a stand-alone story set in modern times. In the story, a young scientist sets out to solve the theory of everything, an explanation to all aspects of the universe, while navigating his troubled mental health and personal life. Lucassen composed all the music, and wrote the story and lyrics with his girlfriend Lori Linstruth, making it the first Ayreon album in which he shares lyrics credit for all songs.

In the typical style of the project, the album features several guest singers to portray the characters across the album, including Tommy Karevik of Kamelot and Seventh Wonder, Marko Hietala of Nightwish and Tarot, Cristina Scabbia of Lacuna Coil, and Asia and former King Crimson member John Wetton. It also features various guest musicians such as keyboardists Rick Wakeman (ex-Yes), Keith Emerson (ex-Emerson, Lake & Palmer), Jordan Rudess (Dream Theater), and guitarist Steve Hackett (ex-Genesis). It is Lucassen's first collaboration with every singer on the album, with the exception of backing vocalist Wilmer Waarbroek, who already sung on Lucassen's solo album Lost in the New Real.

According to Lucassen, the album is "four long tracks divided into various segments", with each song longer than 20 minutes for a total of almost one hour and a half of music. The complete number of segments is 42, which is the Answer to the Ultimate Question of Life, the Universe, and Everything in The Hitchhiker's Guide to the Galaxy, recognized by Lucassen as a direct reference. On 18 December 2013 Lucassen released on YouTube a free version of the album with all vocals sung by Waarbroek.

The Theory of Everything was a commercial success and received acclaim from audience and critics, who praised its instrumental sections, songwriting, story, and the performances of the cast.

== Production ==
After the release of 01011001, Lucassen decided to temporarily put Ayreon on hold, because he was not inspired to continue and also because many critics noted that there was nothing new being offered on 01011001. He then focused on other projects, such as Guilt Machine's first album, Star One's second album, and a new solo album.

On 23 August 2012 Lucassen published on his YouTube channel that he started composing a new project, and on 9 October 2012 revealed it via YouTube again to be a new Ayreon album, planned for 2013. On 26 March 2013 Lucassen revealed the name of the next album to be The Theory of Everything. Since then, Lucassen progressively revealed the singers and musicians involved in the new album, through YouTube. On September 6, the artwork and track listing for the new album was revealed on the official Ayreon Facebook page. The album cover was painted by frequent Ayreon artist Jef Bertels.

During the recordings, Lucassen suffered an elbow injury. According to him, it is "pretty serious" and will need to be operated on, with only 70/80% chance of success. However, he chose to not be operated immediately because it would delay the release of The Theory of Everything, and continued to record despite the pain.

Lucassen described the album as "less heavy and more instrumental than 01011001", and also cited the films A Beautiful Mind and Rain Man as inspirations for the lyrics.

== Plot ==
The story follows a young prodigy and his family, a girl, a rival, and a teacher, none named. The first phase opens ("Prologue: The Blackboard") with a hint of the genius of the prodigy before the story falls back eleven years to the prodigy's parents ("The Theory of Everything part 1"). The father is working on the titular "Theory of Everything"—a unified theory explaining all the forces of the cosmos. In doing so, he neglects his wife and young child. The main character, the prodigy, is finally introduced ("The Prodigy's World") and reveals his genius prevents him from normal social interactions. He frequently lives inside his head and stares off into space. Human life and society bore him and don't fit into the grand scheme of things—his mental model of the universe.

The story jumps three years ("The Teacher's Discovery") where the teacher, a voice from the prologue, discovers the boy's genius. A rival classmate accuses him of fraud, and a girl rises to his defense ("Love and Envy"). The teacher arranges a meeting with the boy's father ("The Gift"), where the father learns that his son is more than just an awkward kid who spaces out. A few more years pass ("Inertia") and the prodigy tries to reach out to his father to no avail. Finally, the father and mother decide the child needs some medical intervention ("The Theory of Everything Part 2"): the mother believes the child needs to fit in with society to have a normal life, and the father finally realizes that his genius son might help him discover the Theory of Everything.

Phase 2 deals with the prodigy's visit to therapy. A drug is introduced that might help him, but the psychiatrist admits that it is very experimental. Even though the father is intrigued, the mother is completely against anything that might endanger their son ("Diagnosis" / "The Argument 1"). His teacher reveals that he could use the child to boost his own popularity; the girl reveals she wants him to open up to her ("Potential"). As the prodigy continues living in his own chaotic world the father wonders if the psychiatrist's drug really will help ("Quantum Chaos"). The Father wants the child to help with the Theory of Everything, and decides to take the therapist's drug ("Dark Medicine") and feed it to the child secretly. The prodigy takes very well to it, as the results are almost immediate and miraculous ("Alive"). The mother is also happy about their son's drastic improvement, even though she is still unaware that it is due to the drug she was adamantly opposed to ("The Prediction").

Phase 3 opens as the teacher also notices the changes in the prodigy, but wonders if something unhealthy is occurring. But he is still determined to help the prodigy ("Transformation"). As a result of the drug the prodigy has a great new found confidence and finally confronts his classmate rival ("Collision"). Eventually the psychiatrist tells the father that the drug can cause severe psychosis and delusions and urges him to stop the treatment. The father comes clean to the prodigy about giving him the drug. Feeling betrayed he runs away ("Side Effects"). Eventually, after trying to find the teacher, the prodigy runs into the girl and the rival, and explains to them about what his father did. The prodigy asks if he can stay with the girl, who reciprocates his offer without hesitation or resistance at the behest of the rival who says the prodigy will use her. Undaunted, the girl tries to take care of the prodigy, but without the drug he withdraws into himself again ("Magnetism"). Time passes and the rival reveals he can synthesize the therapist's drug if the prodigy helps in a bank robbery ("Quid Pro Quo"). When the plan succeeds, the girl tells the prodigy to leave since she is disappointed in his choices, and he is heartbroken that she is gone ("Fortune?").

Phase 4 opens three months before the prologue, with the girl and the mother revealing their helplessness in the main character's situation ("Mirror of Dreams"). The prodigy, having nowhere else to turn now, meets the teacher again to resume work on the Theory of Everything. With money now a formality to the prodigy, he buys and resumes his work in a lighthouse ("The Lighthouse"). The father knows his chances for discovering the theory lie with the prodigy, but the mother doesn't want to hear any more of it ("The Argument 2"). After months of fruitless arguments, the mother tells the father that she is leaving him, he is heartbroken and believes there is only one thing left for him to do ("The Parting"). The prodigy later—only one day before the opening of the story—sees the father in the lighthouse to help unify their efforts and complete the work. They work constantly all throughout the night while the prodigy takes a much larger dose of the drug than usual ("The Visitation" / "The Breakthrough"). Exhausted, the prodigy writes a quick note explaining their success to the teacher ("The Note").

The next day—same day as the Prologue—, the real nature of the previous day's events is revealed: the teacher comes to visit the lighthouse and finds the prodigy lying catatonic in the corner, with the note crumpled in his hand. He immediately calls the girl to tell her of the note regarding the breakthrough. As the girl showed up at the lighthouse to meet the teacher, she is already in tears after a phone call with the prodigy's mother. The girl explains that the father took his own life before the supposed visitation ("The Uncertainty Principle"); he couldn't have been there with his son for the breakthrough ("Dark Energy"), and it could only be a hallucination from the prodigy. The girl and the mother mourn together the losses of their loved ones, come to an agreement that the world isn't ready to know the Theory of Everything, and decide to move on with their lives. After everyone else leaves the lighthouse, the teacher examines the blackboard and notices there are two different hand writing styles, as if the father and son had truly completed their theory together ("The Theory of Everything Part 3" / "The Blackboard - Reprise").

== Critical reception ==
Professional ratings
Review scores
Source	Rating
Classic Rock	7/10 stars
Dangerdog Music Reviews	4.5/5 stars
Metal.de	9/10 stars
Metal Hammer (GER)	7/7 stars
Metal Injection	8.5/10 stars
Metal Mouth	10/10 stars
Myglobalmind	10/10 stars
Nightfall in Metal Earth	4.5/5 stars
Sputnikmusic	3.5/5 stars
Ultimate Guitar Archive	8.6/10
Metal1.info	9/10 stars

The album received positive reviews from music critics. Metal Mouth gave the album a perfect rating of 10 out of 10, stating " a massive undertaking that completely pays off. It draws from many genres and gives you so much more than you’d ever expect, leaving you with a sense of overwhelming calm [...] This album is essential listening. It’s prog perfection, and for that I have to salute everyone involved." Dangerdog Music Reviews called The Theory of Everything "another melodic progressive rock tour-de-force from the creative mind of Arjen Lucassen" and gave a near-perfect score of 4.5 out of 5.

Metal Injection called the album "the most musically diverse offering [Lucassen] had a hand in, perhaps with the exception of his solo record [...] listeners should treat it as a proper musical or film in a theater. Try to experience it all in one sitting for the full effect. It's absolutely worth it." MyGlobalMind called it a "masterpiece, filled with many different musical styles, seven strong guest singers, many guest musicians, and an unforgettable story that’s sure to take you on an emotional ride. In short, it delivers everything an Ayreon album should deliver, then it goes one step further."

Despite a positive review, the reviewer for Sputnikmusic pointed out several faults: "the issue with The Theory of Everything lies in an underdevelopment of musical structure and an over reliance on an operatic vocal format that knows no brevity [...] From a storytelling and lyrical point of view, The Theory of Everything fails to focus on the introspective and emotional dialog the way The Human Equation did". He also criticized the singing performances, calling them "unemotive sing-talking", as well as the characters that he felt less inspired than in previous Ayreon albums. He did however strongly praised the "dazzling and intriguing" and "incredibly well-arranged" instrumental sections, and gave the overall album a note of 3.5 out of 5.

== Track listing ==
=== CD 1 ===
All lyrics are written by Arjen Anthony Lucassen and Lori Linstruth; all music is composed by Lucassen

Phase I: Singularity
No.	Title	Vocalists	Length
1.	"Prologue: The Blackboard"	Janne JB Christoffersson, Sara Squadrani	1:55
2.	"The Theory of Everything Part 1"	Michael Mills, Cristina Scabbia	3:01
3.	"Patterns"	Instrumental	1:03
4.	"The Prodigy's World"	Scabbia, Tommy Karevik	1:31
5.	"The Teacher's Discovery"	JB, Karevik, Marko Hietala	2:58
6.	"Love and Envy"	Squadrani, Hietala	2:39
7.	"Progressive Waves"	Instrumental	3:16
8.	"The Gift"	JB, Mills	2:38
9.	"The Eleventh Dimension"	Instrumental	1:46
10.	"Inertia"	Karevik	0:45
11.	"The Theory of Everything Part 2"	Scabbia, Mills	1:50
Total length:			23:29

Phase II: Symmetry
No.	Title	Vocalists	Length
12.	"The Consultation"	John Wetton, Karevik, Scabbia	3:49
13.	"Diagnosis"	Wetton, Mills, Scabbia	2:48
14.	"The Argument 1"	Scabbia, Mills	0:24
15.	"The Rival's Dilemma"	Hietala	2:22
16.	"Surface Tension"	Instrumental	0:57
17.	"A Reason to Live"	JB, Squadrani	0:45
18.	"Potential"	JB, Squadrani	3:14
19.	"Quantum Chaos"	Instrumental	2:09
20.	"Dark Medicine"	Wetton, Mills	1:23
21.	"Alive!"	Karevik, Mills	2:29
22.	"The Prediction"	Scabbia	1:05
Total length:			21:31

=== CD 2 ===
Phase III: Entanglement
No.	Title	Vocalists	Length
1.	"Fluctuations"	Instrumental	1:01
2.	"Transformation"	JB, Karevik	3:13
3.	"Collision"	Karevik, Hietala	3:26
4.	"Side Effects"	Wetton, Mills, Karevik	2:59
5.	"Frequency Modulation"	Instrumental	1:44
6.	"Magnetism"	Karevik, Squadrani, Hietala	3:54
7.	"Quid Pro Quo"	Hietala, Karevik, Squadrani	3:09
8.	"String Theory"	Instrumental	1:29
9.	"Fortune?"	Hietala, Squadrani, Karevik	1:36
Total length:			22:34

Phase IV: Unification
No.	Title	Vocalists	Length
10.	"Mirror of Dreams"	Squadrani, Scabbia	2:30
11.	"The Lighthouse"	JB, Karevik	3:16
12.	"The Argument 2"	Mills, Scabbia	0:49
13.	"The Parting"	Scabbia, Mills	3:27
14.	"The Visitation"	Mills, Karevik	3:27
15.	"The Breakthrough"	Karevik, Mills	2:00
16.	"The Note"	Karevik	1:11
17.	"The Uncertainty Principle"	JB, Squadrani	2:09
18.	"Dark Energy"	Instrumental	0:44
19.	"The Theory of Everything Part 3"	Scabbia, Squadrani	1:29
20.	"The Blackboard (Reprise)"	JB	1:13
Total length:			22:20

== Charts ==
=== Weekly charts ===
Chart (2013)	Peak position
Australian Albums (ARIA)	37
Belgian Albums (Ultratop Flanders)	58
Belgian Albums (Ultratop Wallonia)	36
Dutch Albums (Album Top 100)	3
Finnish Albums (Suomen virallinen lista)	28
German Albums (Offizielle Top 100)	21
Norwegian Albums (VG-lista)	26
Swedish Albums (Sverigetopplistan)	46
Swiss Albums (Schweizer Hitparade)	41
US Heatseekers Albums (Billboard)	13

=== Year-end charts ===
Chart (2013)	Position
Dutch Albums (Album Top 100)	92

== Personnel ==
Vocalists

- JB (Grand Magus) as The Teacher
- Sara Squadrani (Ancient Bards) as The Girl
- Michael Mills (Toehider) as The Father
- Cristina Scabbia (Lacuna Coil) as The Mother
- Tommy Karevik (Kamelot, Seventh Wonder) as The Prodigy
- Marko Hietala (Nightwish, Tarot) as The Rival
- John Wetton (Asia, U.K., ex-King Crimson, ex-Family, ex-Roxy Music) as The Psychiatrist
- Wilmer Waarbroek - backing vocals

Production

- Arjen Anthony Lucassen - production, mixing, recording
- Brett Caldas-Lima - mastering

Musicians

- Arjen Anthony Lucassen - electric and acoustic guitars, bass guitar, mandolin, analog synthesizers, Hammond, Solina Strings
- Ed Warby - drums, percussion
- Rick Wakeman (ex-Yes) - minimoog solo on "Diagnosis", synthesizer solo on "Surface Tension", piano
- Keith Emerson (ex-Emerson, Lake & Palmer) - modular moog solo on "Progressive Waves"
- Jordan Rudess (Dream Theater, Liquid Tension Experiment) - synthesizer solo on "Progressive Waves"
- Steve Hackett (ex-Genesis) - guitar solo on "The Parting"
- Troy Donockley (Nightwish) - uilleann pipes, whistles
- Ben Mathot - violin
- Maaike Peterse (Kingfisher Sky) - cello
- Jeroen Goossens - flutes, bass flute, piccolo, bamboo flute, contrabass flute
- Siddharta Barnhoorn - orchestrations
- Michael Mills (Toehider) - Irish bouzouki
