= Golden Age of Music =

Studio album by Arjen Lucassen's Supersonic Revolution
- Released: 19 May 2023
- Genre: Progressive metal; progressive rock
- Length: 54:28
- Label: Music Theories
- Producer: Arjen Anthony Lucassen

Arjen Lucassen chronology
Revel in Time (2022)	Golden Age of Music (2023)

Singles from Golden Age of Music
- 1. "The Glamattack" Released: 16 February 2023; 2. "The Rise of the Starman" Released: 23 March 2023; 3. "Golden Age of Music" Released: 20 April 2023

Golden Age of Music is the first studio album by Arjen Lucassen's Supersonic Revolution. It was released on 19 May 2023 by Music Theories. The album focuses on the 1970s and is musically highly inspired by music from the 1970s, ranging from progressive rock to heavy metal to glam rock, more specifically names such as Pink Floyd, Led Zeppelin, Deep Purple and Rainbow, with its lyrics also referencing the cinema of that time, for example Steven Spielberg.

The project arose from a request of a German music magazine who asked Lucassen if he had a cover version available. He proposed to record one for them and with a deadline of one week quickly put together a band with some of his favorite musicians. After recording a cover of ZZ Top's "Heard It on the X", they decided to form a band and record a studio album.

The cover art is designed by Claudio Bergamin. It was promoted with three singles: "The Glamattack", released on 17 February; "Rise of the Starman", about David Bowie and Ziggy Stardust, on 23 March; and the title track on 20 April, containing references of the 1970s including T. Rex, Rainbow, Pink Floyd, Deep Purple, Alice Cooper and Thin Lizzy.

== Track listing ==
All lyrics are written by Arjen Lucassen, except "Holy Holy Ground" by John Jaycee Cuijpers; all music is composed by Arjen Lucassen, except "SR Prelude" by Joost van den Broek and "The Glamattack" by Arjen Lucassen and Joost van den Broek.

No.	Title	Length
1.	"SR Prelude"	1:32
2.	"The Glamattack"	5:15
3.	"Golden Age of Music"	5:12
4.	"The Rise of the Starman"	4:49
5.	"Burn It Down"	4:52
6.	"Odyssey"	6:46
7.	"They Took Us by Storm"	5:05
8.	"Golden Boy"	5:49
9.	"Holy Holy Ground"	5:06
10.	"Fight of the Century"	3:55
11.	"Came to Mock, Stayed to Rock"	6:07

Bonus tracks
No.	Title	Writer(s)	Length
12.	"Children of the Revolution" (T. Rex cover)	Marc Bolan	3:05
13.	"Heard It on the X" (ZZ Top cover)	Billy Gibbons, Dusty Hill, Frank Beard	2:55
14.	"Fantasy" (Earth, Wind & Fire cover)	Maurice White, Verdine White, Eddie del Barrio	4:09
15.	"Love Is All" (Roger Glover cover)	Roger Glover, Eddie Hardin, Ronnie James Dio	3:08

== Personnel ==
- Arjen Anthony Lucassen – bass
- Joost van den Broek – keyboards
- Timo Somers – guitar
- Koen Herfst – drums
- John Jaycee Cuijpers – vocals

== Charts ==
Chart performance for Golden Age of Music
Chart (2023)	Peak position
Belgian Albums (Ultratop Flanders)	156
Dutch Albums (Album Top 100)	2
German Albums (Offizielle Top 100)	59
Swiss Albums (Schweizer Hitparade)	28
