= The Human Equation =

Studio album by Ayreon
- Released: 25 May 2004
- Recorded: October 2003–March 2004
- Genre: Progressive metal
- Length: 102:14
- Label: Inside Out Music
- Producer: Arjen Lucassen

Ayreon chronology
Universal Migrator Part 2: Flight of the Migrator (2000)	The Human Equation (2004)	01011001 (2008)

Arjen Anthony Lucassen chronology
Live on Earth (2003)	The Human Equation (2004)	Embrace the Storm (2005)

Singles from The Human Equation
- 1. "Day Eleven: Love" Released: 2004; 2. "Loser" Released: 2004

Professional ratings
Review scores
Source	Rating
Laut.de	4/5 stars
Plattentests.de	8/10
Rock Hard	9/10

The Human Equation is the sixth album from the progressive rock project Ayreon by Dutch musician Arjen Anthony Lucassen, released on 25 May 2004 via Inside Out Music. As with other Ayreon albums, it features guest appearances from several musicians previously unrelated to the project, including James LaBrie of Dream Theater, Mikael Åkerfeldt of Opeth, Eric Clayton of Saviour Machine, and Devin Townsend, performing music arranged and written by Lucassen.

As with nearly every Ayreon album, it is a concept album with each character being portrayed by one singer. However unlike previous albums, The Human Equation is not a sci-fi story but takes place almost entirely in the mind of a character called Me (played by LaBrie) who is in a coma after a car crash, with each song consisting of one day spent in coma. While his Wife (Marcela Bovio) and Best Friend (Lucassen) are at his side in the real world, Me, trapped in his own mind, encounters representations of his own feelings and recalls his life from his childhood to his crash.

The album was released in three different editions: a regular edition with two CDs, a Special Edition with two CDs and a DVD, and a Limited Deluxe Edition with two CDs, a DVD and a 36-page booklet. The album peaked at #7 at Dutch Albums Chart and at #50 at Germany Albums Top 50. The single "Day Eleven: Love" peaked at #39 at Dutch Singles Chart. The album was also released on vinyl in December 2012.

The Human Equation is one of the few Ayreon albums in which Lucassen did not write all the lyrics (the others are Into the Electric Castle and The Theory of Everything): Townsend wrote all lyrics for his character Rage, while Heather Findlay of Mostly Autumn and Devon Graves of Deadsoul Tribe also wrote some of the lyrics for their characters, Love and Agony. The albums marks the first collaboration between Lucassen and Bovio, selected by Lucassen via an internet female singing contest to play Wife. The following year, Bovio and Lucassen created together progressive/symphonic metal band Stream of Passion.

== Concept and storyline ==
The album explores the idea of psychological rebirth, and follows the story of a man who, after falling into a coma following a car crash, is confronted with his past, his emotions, and his current situation as he lays trapped inside his own mind. The circumstances surrounding the crash are mysterious, as the man ("Me", portrayed by James LaBrie) ploughed into a tree on a deserted road in broad daylight. Following this, he slips into a twenty-day coma, with each day represented by a single song. Each song follows a slightly different format, though there are major common themes, such as the presence of Me's manifest emotions in his dream world including Fear (Mikael Åkerfeldt), Reason (Eric Clayton), and Pride (Magnus Ekwall); the presence of Me's Wife (Marcela Bovio) and Best Friend (Arjen Anthony Lucassen) at his bedside; and the past events that Me is forced to reflect on.

The plot builds from Me's early broken state to his eventual rebirth as a new and better man. His own dark past, in which he suffered beneath an abusive Father (Mike Baker), was driven to become merciless by school bullies, and eventually betrayed his closest friend for his own benefit; is intertwined with the plot surrounding Wife and Best Friend, eventually revealing the cause of the crash: Me had witnessed the two sharing an intimate moment, and had swerved his car into a tree in his despair. The three eventually come clean and forgive each other, leading Me to conquer his negative emotions and escape his nightmarish prison.

The story terminates with a sci-fi twist in contrast to the psychodrama of the album, but reminiscent of earlier Ayreon releases. The final song cuts suddenly to silence as it crescendoes to a climax, and a computerised voice announces the shut-down of the Dream Sequencer. The voice of Forever of the Stars then speaks the final words of the album ("Emotions...I remember..."), tying its events into the overall Ayreon plot that began with The Final Experiment.

== The Theater Equation ==
The Theater Equation is a video release of a live performance of The Human Equation in 2015.

== Track listing ==
All lyrics are written by Arjen Anthony Lucassen except where noted; all music is composed by Lucassen.

CD 1
No.	Title	Vocals (in order of appearance)	Length
1.	"Day One: Vigil"	Arjen Anthony Lucassen, Marcela Bovio	1:33
2.	"Day Two: Isolation"	James LaBrie, Mikael Åkerfeldt, Eric Clayton, Irene Jansen, Magnus Ekwall, Heather Findlay	8:42
3.	"Day Three: Pain" (Lucassen/Devin Townsend)	Devon Graves, LaBrie, Devin Townsend, Findlay	4:58
4.	"Day Four: Mystery"	Lucassen, Bovio, Jansen, LaBrie, Ekwall, Findlay, Graves	5:37
5.	"Day Five: Voices"	Ekwall, LaBrie, Clayton, Findlay, Åkerfeldt	7:09
6.	"Day Six: Childhood"	Graves, LaBrie, Åkerfeldt	5:05
7.	"Day Seven: Hope"	Lucassen, LaBrie	2:47
8.	"Day Eight: School" (Lucassen/Townsend)	Åkerfeldt, LaBrie, Townsend, Graves, Ekwall, Clayton, Jansen	4:22
9.	"Day Nine: Playground" (Adaptation of Edvard Grieg's "Morning Mood")	instrumental	2:15
10.	"Day Ten: Memories"	Lucassen, Bovio, Ekwall, Findlay, Jansen, Clayton	3:57
11.	"Day Eleven: Love"	LaBrie, Findlay, Jansen, Ekwall, Graves, Åkerfeldt, Bovio	4:18
Total length:			50:20

CD 2
No.	Title	Vocals	Length
12.	"Day Twelve: Trauma"	Clayton, Åkerfeldt, Graves, Jansen, Ekwall	9:54
13.	"Day Thirteen: Sign" (Lucassen/Heather Findlay)	Findlay, Bovio, LaBrie, Lucassen	4:47
14.	"Day Fourteen: Pride"	LaBrie, Ekwall, Clayton	4:42
15.	"Day Fifteen: Betrayal"	Åkerfeldt, Graves, Clayton, Jansen, LaBrie	5:24
16.	"Day Sixteen: Loser" (Lucassen/Townsend)	Mike Baker, Townsend	4:46
17.	"Day Seventeen: Accident?" (Lucassen/Devon Graves)	Clayton, Bovio, Graves, Jansen	5:42
18.	"Day Eighteen: Realization"	Clayton, LaBrie, Jansen, Ekwall, Findlay, Graves, Åkerfeldt, Lucassen, Bovio	4:31
19.	"Day Nineteen: Disclosure"	Lucassen, Bovio, Findlay, Jansen, LaBrie	4:42
20.	"Day Twenty: Confrontation"	Lucassen, LaBrie, Bovio, Findlay, Graves, Jansen, Clayton, Ekwall, Åkerfeldt, Peter Daltrey	7:03
Total length:			51:41

Disc 2 has ten four-second and one nine-second hidden tracks which introduce "Day Twelve: Trauma".

DVD (Special and Deluxe editions)
No.	Title	Length
1.	"Inside" (behind the scenes)	45:27
2.	"Concept" (the concept of The Human Equation)	3:05
3.	"Drums" (Ed Warby's drums)	3:32
4.	"Video" (videoclip of "Day Eleven: Love")	3:49
5.	"Teaser" (teaser trailer)	1:28
Total length:		57:25

== Personnel ==
Vocalists

- James LaBrie (Dream Theater) as Me
- Mikael Åkerfeldt (Opeth, Bloodbath) as Fear
- Eric Clayton (Saviour Machine) as Reason
- Heather Findlay (ex-Mostly Autumn) as Love
- Irene Jansen as Passion
- Magnus Ekwall (The Quill) as Pride
- Devon Graves (Deadsoul Tribe, Psychotic Waltz) as Agony
- Arjen Anthony Lucassen as Best Friend
- Marcela Bovio (Elfonía) as Wife
- Mike Baker (Shadow Gallery) as Father
- Devin Townsend (Strapping Young Lad) as Rage
- Peter Daltrey (ex-Kaleidoscope) as Voice (uncredited cameo)

Production

- Arjen Anthony Lucassen - production, mixing, recording

Musicians

- Arjen Anthony Lucassen – all electric and acoustic guitars, bass guitars, mandolin, lap steel guitar, keyboards, synthesizers, Hammond
- Ed Warby (Gorefest, Hail of Bullets) – all drums and percussion
- Robert Baba – all violins
- Marieke van den Broek – all cellos
- John McManus (Celtus, Mama's Boys) – low flute on Days 13, 16 and 18 and whistle on Day 18
- Jeroen Goossens – flute on Days 3, 5, 9, 14 and 18, alto flute on Day 2, bass flute on Days 5 and 14, panpipes on Day 6, descant and treble recorders on Day 13, didgeridoo on Day 16, bassoon on Day 18
- Joost van den Broek (After Forever) – synthesizer solo on Day 2, spinet on Day 13
- Martin Orford (IQ, Jadis) – synthesizer solo on Day 15
- Ken Hensley (Uriah Heep) – Hammond solo on Day 16
- Oliver Wakeman – synthesizer solo on Day 17

== Charts ==
Chart (2004)	Peak position
Dutch Albums (Album Top 100)	7
French Albums (SNEP)	160
German Albums (Offizielle Top 100)	50

Chart (2025)	Peak position
Dutch Albums (Album Top 100)	1
