= Pools of Sorrow, Waves of Joy =

Studio album by Anthony
- Released: 1993
- Genre: Psychedelic rock; hard rock
- Length: 47:19
- Label: Ray’s Music B.V
- Producer: Anthony

Anthony chronology
Pools of Sorrow, Waves of Joy (1993)	Lost in the New Real (2012)

Arjen Anthony Lucassen chronology
Arabia (1989)	Pools of Sorrow, Waves of Joy (1994)	The Final Experiment (1995)

Pools of Sorrow, Waves of Joy is the debut solo album of Dutch composer, singer, and multi-instrumentalist Arjen Anthony Lucassen, released under the name Anthony. He sang leading vocals and played most of the instruments himself. However unlike most of his future works, Lucassen did not play bass, with Peter Vink (future member of Lucassen's band Star One and future contributor of Lucassen's project Ayreon) playing all bass.

The name of the album comes from the lyrics of the Beatles song "Across the Universe", one of Lucassen's favorite songs. Even though the album spawned three singles with radio spots, it flopped commercially.

== Track listing ==
All tracks are written by Arjen Anthony Lucassen

No.	Title	Length
1.	"Wrong Side of the Street"	5:20
2.	"Best of Friends"	3:09
3.	"Crescendo"	3:40
4.	"Cry Yourself to Sleep"	2:30
5.	"Little Miss Understood"	4:44
6.	"Escape"	4:21
7.	"Country Girl, City Boy"	2:43
8.	"Summer’s in the Air"	2:33
9.	"Days of the Knights"	3:16
10.	"Not Over You"	3:37
11.	"Night on the Town"	2:45
12.	"A-losin’ You"	3:47
13.	"Midnight Train"	2:50
14.	"Pools of Sorrow"	1:57
Total length:		47:19

== Personnel ==
=== Musicians ===
- Arjen Anthony Lucassen - lead and backing vocals, guitars, banjo, mandolin, lute, keyboards and drum programming
- Peter Vink - bass
- Cleem Determeijer - keyboards
- Debbie Schreuder - backing vocals
- Mirjam van Doorn - backing vocals

=== Additional personnel ===
- Arjen Anthony Lucassen - producing and mixing
- Oscar Holleman - assistant producing, engineering and mixing
- Mario Schulz - engineering and mixing
- Peter Brussée - Mastering
- Niels van Iperen - Photography

== Charts ==
Chart performance for Pools of Sorrow, Waves of Joy
Chart (2025)	Peak position
Dutch Albums (Album Top 100)	20
