= Arjen Lucassen =

Dutch musician

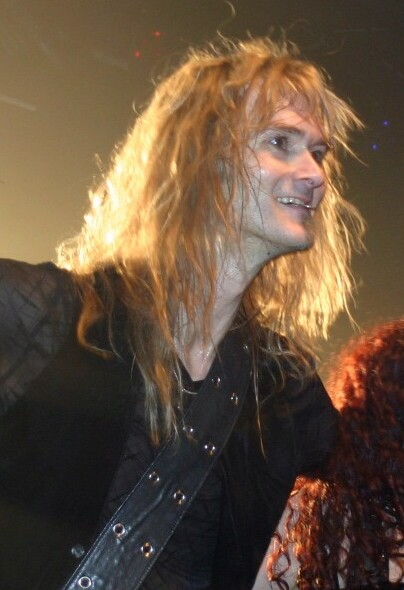
- Lucassen with Stream of Passion in 2007

Background information
- Also known as: Arjen A. Lucassen, Iron Anthony, Anthony
- Born: Arjen Anthony Lucassen; 3 April 1960 (age 66); Hilversum, Netherlands
- Origin: The Hague, Netherlands
- Genres: Progressive rock, heavy metal, folk, electronic, psychedelia, classical
- Instruments: Vocals, guitars, bass, Hammond, keyboards
- Years active: 1980–present
- Member of: Ayreon, Star One, Guilt Machine, The Gentle Storm
- Formerly of: Stream of Passion, Ambeon, Bodine, Vengeance
- Website: arjenlucassen.com

Arjen Anthony Lucassen (born 3 April 1960) is a Dutch singer, songwriter, multi-instrumentalist musician and record producer, best known for his long-running progressive metal/rock opera project Ayreon. Lucassen started his career in 1980 as the guitarist and backing vocalist of Dutch heavy metal band Bodine as Iron Anthony, before joining Vengeance in 1984. After eight years he left the band, wanting to go into a more progressive direction, and released two years later an unsuccessful solo album entitled Pools of Sorrow, Waves of Joy under the nickname Anthony.

In 1995, Lucassen released an album uncredited to any artist called Ayreon: The Final Experiment, in which he sang, wrote every song and played most of the instruments. The album led to the creation of Ayreon; despite being relatively unknown at first, the project gained notable attention and praise with the release of its third album, Into the Electric Castle, establishing Lucassen as a notable composer of rock operas. Following Ayreon's success, Lucassen has been involved in many other projects: he is the creator, composer and current guitarist/keyboardist of Star One, Guilt Machine, and The Gentle Storm, and the creator and former guitarist of Ambeon and Stream of Passion. He composes and writes most of his songs, but leaves the lyrics to his musical partners in some of his projects.

Lucassen plays a wide variety of instruments: his main instruments are guitar and keyboards, but he also plays bass, banjo and many others. Overall, in his career and including all his bands and projects (as principal instrumentalist/creative force or as a member), Lucassen has released twenty-six studio albums, four live albums, two EPs and seventeen singles. He has also made many minor participations alongside various artists including Shadow Gallery, After Forever, Within Temptation and Avantasia, and appears in over 50 albums.

Since the creation of Ayreon, Lucassen progressively made a name for himself under rock and metal reviewers, with many critics calling him a "genius", and praising his composition abilities and originality. In his review of 01011001, AllMusic reviewer Cosmo Lee stated "Music this over the top almost defies criticism. Reviewing it is like reviewing the world's tallest building. It doesn't care; it just goes on and on." In 2025, Lucassen was knighted as a Member of the Order of the Netherlands Lion.

== Career ==
Lucassen's love of music was sparked in the '60s, when he became a big fan of The Beatles. He decided to learn guitar when he heard Ritchie Blackmore playing in Made in Japan. One of his first bands was called Mover, which he joined around the age of 18.

=== Bodine (1980–1984) ===
In 1980, Lucassen joined Bodine via their drummer Gerrard Haitsma, who was also the drum teacher of Mover's drummer. Under the nickname Iron Anthony, he was featured on their second album, Bold as Brass (1982), and their third and final album, Three Times Running (1983).

Lucassen later recalled about his years with Bodine: "on one side they were good musicians, extremely good musicians, the best drummer in Holland (Gerard Haitsma), an incredible guitar player and a very steddy [sic] bass player (Armand van der Hoff). And I actually learned how to play there, how to play very tight, how to play in tune, you know, to play solo not just fast but to play one note and do it good. But on the other hand, they were kind of boring guys, they were all 10 years older than me, they didn't like partying and stuff. And in those days I was young, I was 20, after the girls and after the party, you know. So it was a bit boring. And another problem in that band was that they didn't like melody, they were in love with AC/DC and stuff like that. And I always liked melodic music, already in those days I was into prog music. So I didn't like to be there, I wrote songs but they were just a little part of me."

In 1984, Lucassen left Bodine to join Vengeance; they disbanded shortly after.

=== Vengeance (1984–1992) ===
In 1984, the newly created band Vengeance played as supporting act for Bodine. When Lucassen, who had been impressed by their performance, was later contacted by the band to ask if he knew any potential replacement for their guitarist who had just left, he proposed himself and joined the band, leaving Bodine.

Regarding their original self-titled album released in 1984, Lucassen stated in a 2002 interview that the album was "horrible", adding "The songs were mostly finished when I joined the band. I think I wrote just two songs for that album and it was recorded very cheap, the sound is bad and the songs are not that good. So it's not a very strong album although you can already hear the potential". The band later established themselves as one of the most successful bands of the Netherlands at the time. He also recalled a concert in Germany cancelled at the last moment because "after the first night Vengeance wrecked the hotel, it was like $10,000 damage. We were not allowed to leave Germany, they took our equipment... so that was really sex, drugs and rock'n'roll!"

In 1989, the band was forced to fire their lead vocalist Leon Goewie, who was, according to Lucassen, "really crazy on stage. The only problem was that he was also crazy offstage. But he also liked to have a stiff drink now and then, if you know what I mean". Vengeance found little success with their new vocalist Ian Parry, and disbanded in 1992 after a surprisingly successful farewell tour.

While Lucassen pursued his solo career, Vengeance's label released The Last of the Fallen Heroes, promoted as a new studio album but actually a compilation of unfinished demos, in 1994. Goewie, who was heavily struggling as a musician after being fired from the band, later contacted Lucassen, asking him to write him songs. Lucassen wrote two songs, which were later featured on a new Vengeance album, Back from Flight 19, in 1997; despite participating to this new album, Lucassen did not re-join Vengeance. He later stated about Back from Flight 19 "I'm not so proud of that album. There's a couple of good songs but it's definitely not Vengeance."

=== Solo debuts (1992–1995) ===
After his departure, Lucassen first tried to create a new band, Planet Nine. However, according to his words in The Final Experiment book, "nobody even wanted to touch it". He released his first solo album, Pools of Sorrow, Waves of Joy, under the name "Anthony" in 1994. It was a commercial flop; according to Lucassen, "people didn't understand it. It wasn't hard rock, it wasn't prog or something. People thought, 'What's that he is doing now? He must be crazy!'"

Remembering this period, Lucassen stated "it was the period in my life when my girlfriend broke up with me, Vengeance broke up and I had no more record deal. So it was a horrible time".

=== Ayreon's debut and fame (1995–2000) ===
After his first unsuccessful solo album, Lucassen began recording The Final Experiment, which was released in 1995 as Ayreon: The Final Experiment on a small Dutch label, Transmission Records, with no artist noted. The album featured a wide array of musical styles, ranging from folk to progressive metal. It was soon followed by Ayreon's first single, "Sail Away to Avalon".

One year later, Lucassen decided to continue the project started with The Final Experiment, using Ayreon as the project's official name, and released a second album titled Actual Fantasy. The album later became the exception in Ayreon's discography, as the only Ayreon release that does not feature a single overarching story concept. The single "The Stranger from Within" from this album was also released. It was a relative commercial failure. Lucassen decided to make one more album, and to stop Ayreon if this one did not become a commercial success.

The same year, Lucassen, tired after the complexity of Ayreon, decided to do "something really simple, like punky or heavy versions of 1960s songs" and released Strange Hobby, a cover album without artist name or any personnel credited at the idea of the record company to make people curious about the record. According to Lucassen, "it didn't work because people knew how it was and they weren't so interested, so it was another flop. But I think it's good. Maybe the songs are too much alike, too short and after 10 songs you think, 'Oh, that's it?!' But I do like that album and I'm not ashamed that I did it."

In 1998 the commercially successful and critically acclaimed Ayreon album Into the Electric Castle was released. It is still currently considered one of the best albums in Lucassen's career. The good reception to the album made Lucassen decide to continue the project Ayreon.

The next two Ayreon albums, Universal Migrator Part 1: The Dream Sequencer and Universal Migrator Part 2: Flight of the Migrator, considered as two parts of the same story, were released simultaneously on 20 June 2000. The two sold well and were received positively, despite Part 1 being considered superior to Part 2 by most critics. "Temple of the Cat" from Part 1 was released as a single the same year, and again the following year in an acoustic version.

=== First side projects; Ambeon and Star One (2000–2003) ===
In 2000 Lucassen created Ambeon, his first side project since the creation of Ayreon, to explore a softer style of his music. The band consisted of him as composer and principal instrumentalist and then 14-year-old Astrid van der Veen as singer and lyricist. They released their only album Fate of a Dreamer in 2001, along with the single "Cold Metal". The album had a limited success. Ambeon's atmospheric sound draws from a wide variety of influences, including celtic, gothic, progressive music, and dark ambient. The songs on Fate of a Dreamer were mostly composed of different remixed pieces of songs from Ayreon albums. The name of the band was a play on the words ambient and Ayreon. The album went out of print shortly after its release and was considered rare, until Lucassen re-released it in December 2011, with the addition of a bonus CD containing previously unreleased tracks. Lucassen was not satisfied with the final result, stating "it's a bit cold for me. It's too electronic, a bit too much computers... And I didn't know how well Astrid could sing for I didn't know her and she didn't know me".

Van der Veen retired from music after the release of Fate of a Dreamer, leading to Lucassen stating that there'd most likely be no future Ambeon albums, despite the fact he would have liked it. Van der Veen eventually released a new record for herself in 2012 after a long battle with depression and addiction, but does not seem to intend on performing actively anymore.

In 2002, Lucassen created another side project, named Star One; it is the only side project to date he made more than one studio album with. Star One focused on four singers: Dan Swanö, Russell Allen, Floor Jansen and Damian Wilson; Lucassen played guitar, keyboards and Hammond organ. Their first album, Space Metal, was released in 2002. The album also had limited success, although it was more successful than Ambeon. Live on Earth, the first live album in Lucassen's career which also included Ayreon songs, was released one year later.

=== The Human Equation and 01011001, Stream of Passion (2003–2008) ===
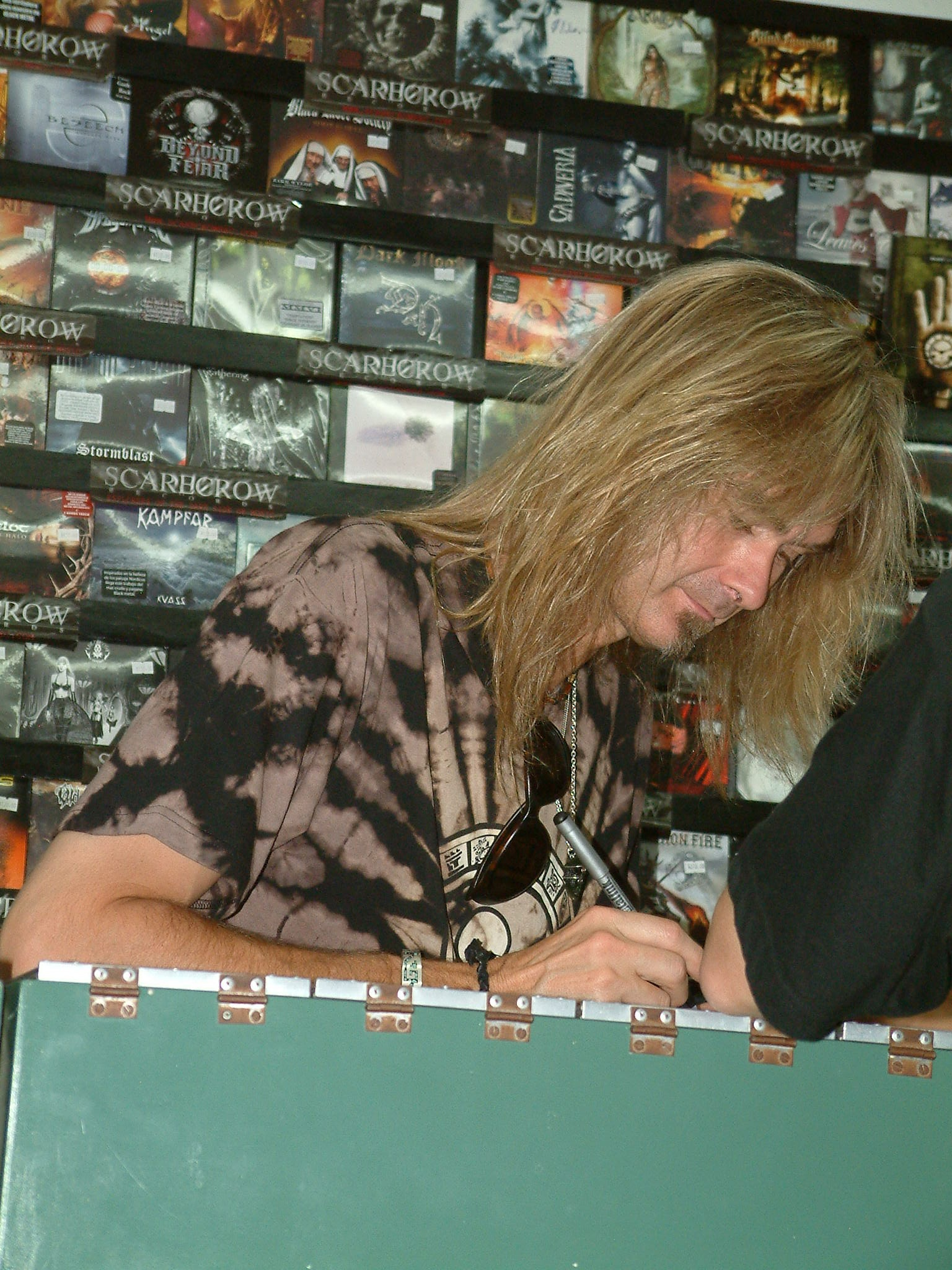
Lucassen at a signature event with Stream of Passion in 2006

Four years after Universal Migrator, Lucassen released Ayreon's sixth album, The Human Equation. It was a commercial success, going No. 7 in the Dutch album charts, and some critics considered the album as Lucassen's best since Into the Electric Castle.)

Special editions of all Ayreon albums were released in 2004 when Lucassen switched label from Transmission to InsideOut Records; The new edition of The Final Experiment featured a bonus disc of newly recorded, semi-acoustic versions of songs from the album, while Actual Fantasy was entirely remixed and partially re-recorded, with the new version being titled Actual Fantasy: Revisited.

In 2005, Lucassen created Stream of Passion to make a more conventional progressive metal band with symphonic and gothic inspirations. He also wanted to showcase the talents of his friend and Mexican female vocalist Marcela Bovio, who also sang on The Human Equation and who had won a contest on Lucassen's website.

He recruited second guitarist Lori Linstruth (his future girlfriend), keyboardist Alejandro Millán (Bovio's then-boyfriend), bassist Johan van Stratum (Bovio's future husband), and drummer Davy Mickers, and started the band. As with Astrid van der Veen for Ambeon, Lucassen was in charge of composing the music, while letting Bovio write the lyrics. They released the album Embrace the Storm in 2005. Like Lucassen had done with Star One, Stream of Passion toured and released a live album, Live in the Real World, in 2006. Also like Star One, the tour featured many Ayreon songs, as well as songs from the album. He finally left the band in 2007, as he had planned. The band continued successfully without him: They subsequently released three studio albums, The Flame Within, Darker Days and A War of Our Own, before amicably disbanding in 2016.

In 2008, Lucassen released a new Ayreon album, 01011001, which achieved commercial success, reaching No. 2 in the Dutch album chart.

The album was meant to be the conclusion of the Ayreon storyline, and after its release Lucassen decided to temporarily stop Ayreon, because he was not inspired to continue and also because many critics (despite the album being well reviewed) noted that there was nothing new being offered on 01011001; he believed that he might make more Ayreon albums in the future, but that they would not follow the same storyline.

=== Ayreon hiatus, focus on other projects (2008–2012) ===
In February 2009 Lucassen announced on his website his new side project: Guilt Machine. The project features a very limited line-up compared to other Lucassen side projects: himself on many instruments and backing vocals, Jasper Steverlinck (Arid) on lead vocals, Chris Maitland (ex-Porcupine Tree) on drums and Lori Linstruth (ex-Stream of Passion) on lead guitar. Their first album On This Perfect Day, released the same year, received a very good critical reception but was Lucassen's least commercially successful album in many years.

In 2010, Lucassen reunited the six other members of Star One, inactive since 2003, and released the band's second studio album Victims of the Modern Age. The album received critical acclaim and was a big commercial success. In December 2011 the Ambeon album Fate of a Dreamer, like the older Ayreon albums, was re-released with bonus tracks.

At the same time as that the Ambeon album was re-released, Lucassen was already busy composing and recording his next project. On 23 April 2012, Lucassen released Lost in the New Real, his first solo album since Pools of Sorrow, Waves of Joy 18 years before. On this album Lucassen sang all lead vocals, wrote all lyrics and played almost all instruments. Also, he asked the Dutch actor Rutger Hauer to provide narration between the tracks. Artwork for this album was done by Claudio Bergamin.

=== Ayreon revival and The Gentle Storm (2012–2017) ===
On 23 August 2012, Lucassen published on his YouTube channel that he started composing "a new project". On 9 October 2012, he revealed it via YouTube again to be a new Ayreon album, planned for 2013.

Responding to fan comments on his website, Lucassen stated on 12 October that it would probably take a year before the album was completed. He also stated that the album would be the start of a new story apart from the previous Ayreon albums, and confirmed the presence of Ed Warby as usual.

In late 2012, Tobias Sammet announced that Arjen would make some guest lead guitar works in his new Avantasia album, The Mystery of Time. This marked the second time both musicians have worked together, the first having been the Ayreon EP Elected, on the title song, in which Tobias sang guest vocals.

On 26 March 2013, Lucassen revealed the name of the next Ayreon's album, The Theory of Everything. This album was released on 25 October and received positive reviews.

On 22 April 2014, Lucassen revealed that his new project would be a collaboration with Dutch singer Anneke van Giersbergen, who previously collaborated with him in Ayreon albums Into the Electric Castle and 01011001. He described it as "an epic double concept album, a combination of 'classical meets metal' and 'acoustic folk'." Lucassen's most recurrent collaborator Ed Warby was featured once again on drums, and it was his very first album featuring double bass among the instruments. He confirmed that Johan van Stratum from his former band Stream of Passion would play bass on the album. Also, due to "unforeseen problems", Warby had to re-record all his drums part in one day, doing that "with time to spare".

On 2 September 2014, Lucassen revealed that his collaboration with van Giersbergen was actually a new band, called The Gentle Storm. A cover EP entitled The Gentle Storm Exclusive Tour CD, and their first album, The Diary, were both released in 2015, with van Giersbergen writing all the lyrics and him composing the music. The band toured in 2015, without him; however, he was featured on a few acoustic shows by the band in the Netherlands.

Between 18 and 20 September 2015, a live version of The Human Equation, directed by Lucassen's former manager Yvette Boertje and featuring most of the original album's singers and musicians, took place for four shows. Although he was not involved in the creative process, Lucassen appeared at the end of each show, and acted as producer and mixer for the DVD/live album, entitled The Theater Equation and released on 17 June 2016.

On 6 October 2016, Lucassen's next project was announced to be a new Ayreon studio album. After revealing the cast one by one during the following months, he revealed its cover art and title, The Source, on 19 January 2017. The album was released on 28 April 2017 and was a commercial success, topping the albums charts in the Netherlands at its release.

=== Focus on Ayreon live performances (2017–present) ===
In November 2016, Lucassen announced the first ever official Ayreon concerts for September 2017, entitled Ayreon Universe. The show featured 16 singers and 11 instrumentalists, all of which had previously worked together with Lucassen on his studio albums. Unlike The Theater Equation, it consisted of unrelated songs from Ayreon performed after each other as in a traditional concert, with a few songs from Star One featured as well. One of the performances was released as a live album/DVD on 30 March 2018, titled Ayreon Universe – The Best of Ayreon Live.

On 7 December 2017, Lucassen stated that a new Ayreon concert would take place on 22 June 2018 at Graspop Metal Meeting, where they would headline the Marquee stage. It featured the same instrumentalists as the Ayreon Universe shows and most of its vocalists, along with Simone Simons, Barry Hay and Tom S. Englund, who had never performed live with Ayreon before, and Mark Jansen, who had never collaborated with Lucassen before; Lucassen himself also performed a few songs.

Between 13 and 15 September 2019, the album Into the Electric Castle was performed in Tilburg in its entirety similarly to The Theater Equation in 2015, this time as official Ayreon performances. Fish, Anneke van Giersbergen, Damian Wilson, Edward Reekers, Edwin Balogh, and George Oosthoek returned from the original cast, alongside Ed Warby and flutist Thijs van Leer, who also performed on the original album. Simone Simons and Mark Jansen of Epica, Praying Mantis singer John Jaycee Cuijpers, Marcela Bovio, VUUR bassist Johan van Stratum, and Ex Libris members Dianne van Giersbergen and Bob Wijtsma were also featured, with actor John de Lancie acting as narrator. It was released as the live album Electric Castle Live and Other Tales on 27 March 2020.

Ayreon was supposed to headline the Night of the Prog Festival in Germany on 18 July 2020 to perform Into the Electric Castle once again; however, the event was cancelled due to the COVID-19 pandemic.

On 8 May 2020, Lucassen revealed on his YouTube channel that his next album would be an Ayreon album, titled Transitus and to be released the same year; the album has been released alongside a tie-in comic book on 25 September 2020.

Beginning 9 February 2021 on his Facebook page, Lucassen began teasing a new Star One album. On 6 October 2021 he revealed that it would be titled Revel in Time. The album was released on 18 February 2022 on different formats, followed by re-releases of Star One (11 March 2022) and Victims of the Modern Age (1 April 2022).

On 19 January 2023, it was announced that Lucassen had formed a new band called Arjen Lucassen's Supersonic Revolution. On 19 May 2023, they released the 1970s-influenced album Golden Age of Music.

Between 14 and 17 September 2023, much like with the album "Into The Electric Castle", shows were held in the Dutch city of Tilburg, but this time for the album "01011001", under the title "01011001 - Live Beneath The Waves". These shows were teased on 29 September 2022 via a cryptic teaser on social medias, and were officially announced on 13 October 2022, along with the album that would be played on its entirety. The cast for these live shows featured many of the original singers and performers: Hansi Kürsch of Blind Guardian, Tom S. Englund of Evergrey, Daniel Gildenlöw of Pain of Salvation, Jonas Renkse of Katatonia, Anneke van Giesbergen, Simone Simons of Epica, Wudstik, Marjan Welman, Liselotte Hegt, Magali Luyten, Ed Warby, Joost van den Broek, Ben Mathot and Jeroen Goossens; as well as artists new to the album but not to Arjen's music: Damian Wilson, Brittney Slayes of Unleash the Archers, Micheal Mills of Toehider and John Jaycee Cuijpers of Praying Mantis, along with instrumentalists Marcel Coenen, Timo Somers, Johan van Stratum and Jurriaan Westerveld. The live album was released on 17 April 2024

On 13 November 2023, he announced he would be reviving an old project from 1993 with friend and singer Robert Soeterboek, Plan Nine. The album The Long-Lost Songs would be released under this project on 17 April 2024, along with previously mentioned "01011001 - Live Beneath the Waves".

Lucassen later collaborated with Simone Simons on her debut solo album, Vermillion, which was released on 23 August 2024.

In 25 April 2025, he was knighted by the Order of the Netherlands Lion, "for his achievements in progressive rock and metal music", and "His albums are truly unique, and hundreds of thousands of fans have created a unique community around his music. This makes him an ambassador for Dutch rock music".

== Personal life ==
Lucassen stated that to him, "Music is everything. Both listening and creating. Even if I wouldn't be successful I would be creating music. Music chose me, I didn't choose music. I have no choice in the matter whatsoever!"

According to Lucassen, his self-made motto is "the meaning of life is to give life meaning", a sentence which he included in the Ayreon song "The Sixth Extinction" from 01011001, and considers himself "a very rational man. I believe in science".

=== Family and relationships ===
Lucassen has an older brother, Gjalt, who speaks through a megaphone on the song "I'm The Slime" from his solo album Lost in the New Real. Every Lucassen album contains a "Gjalt joke" in its booklet, in which he refers to his brother. This is, at times, done in both a joking and/or mocking fashion, as for years he and Gjalt have had a rocky relationship and have not always got along. He was married to Jolanda Verduijn, who appeared as bassist on The Final Experiment, until they divorced in 2006/2007.

Lucassen is currently in a relationship with American guitarist and lyricist Lori Linstruth, who left Sweden to move in with him. She is his former bandmate from both Stream of Passion and Guilt Machine, and was featured in several Ayreon albums. Despite retiring as an active performer in 2010, she still acts as his manager, a role she has held since 2007, and is responsible for various other tasks on his albums; she notably co-wrote the story and lyrics of the Ayreon album The Theory of Everything. According to Lucassen, Linstruth supervises the making of all his works, notably his lyrics as English is her native language, and she is also an English teacher.

=== Health issues ===
During the recordings of The Human Equation from 2003 to 2004, Lucassen suffered from "increasing lower back problems". Doctors gave him an MRI examination, revealing he was suffering from a hernia; he had his examination filmed to use it for a video shoot, "as the 'Me' character [from The Human Equation] would also have needed a scan after his car accident".

Lucassen has suffered from permanent anosmia since 2007. The same year, he suffered from a depressive episode which required medical help, due to the disease, his constant work over the last years, and his recent divorce with Verduijn resulting in him living on his own.

On 3 September 2012, he revealed on his Facebook page that he had been suffering from an incurable tinnitus for the past two months.

== Discography ==
Solo albums

- Pools of Sorrow, Waves of Joy (1994)
- Strange Hobby (cover album) (1996)
- Lost in the New Real (2012)
- Songs No One Will Hear (2025)

Ambeon

- Fate of a Dreamer (2001)

Ayreon

- The Final Experiment (1995)
- Actual Fantasy (1996)
- Into the Electric Castle (1998)
- Universal Migrator Part 1: The Dream Sequencer (2000)
- Universal Migrator Part 2: Flight of the Migrator (2000)
- The Human Equation (2004)
- 01011001 (2008)
- The Theory of Everything (2013)
- The Source (2017)
- Transitus (2020)

Bodine

- Bold as Brass (1982)
- Three Times Running (1983)

The Gentle Storm

- The Diary (2015)

Guilt Machine

- On This Perfect Day (2009)

Plan Nine

- The Long Lost Songs (2024)

Star One

- Space Metal (2002)
- Victims of the Modern Age (2010)
- Revel in Time (2022)

Stream of Passion

- Embrace the Storm (2005)
- Live in the Real World (2006)

Supersonic Revolution

- Golden Age of Music (2023)

Vengeance^{1}

- Vengeance (1984)
- We Have Ways to Make You Rock (1986)
- Take It or Leave It (1987)
- Arabia (1989)
- The Last of the Fallen Heroes (1994)^{2}

^{1} Lucassen also contributed to the 1997 album Back from Flight 19, but was not credited as band member.
^{2} Despite being considered by Lucassen as a compilation of unfinished demos, the album was released as a new studio album with Lucassen credited as band member.

== See also ==
- List of ambient music artists
