= Actual Fantasy =

Studio album by Ayreon
- Released: 23 October 1996
- Recorded: 1996
- Studio: The Electric Castle Studio
- Genres: Progressive metal, progressive rock
- Length: 54:18
- Label: Transmission
- Producer: Arjen Lucassen

Ayreon chronology
| The Final Experiment (1995) | Actual Fantasy (1996) | Into the Electric Castle (1998) |

Arjen Anthony Lucassen chronology
| The Final Experiment (1995) | Actual Fantasy (1996) | Strange Hobby (1996) |

Actual Fantasy is an album released in 1996 by Dutch multi-instrumentalist Arjen A. Lucassen and is the second album of his Ayreon project. It is the only Ayreon release that does not feature a single overarching story concept, but instead draws on science fiction and fantasy films for inspiration, as well as stories written by Arjen himself.

In 2004, Arjen moved to a new record label, Inside Out Germany. With this move came re-issues of all previous Ayreon releases, including Actual Fantasy. The re-issue came with a bonus DVD featuring a 5.1 remix of the entire original album, a video clip for "The Stranger from Within," and a video featurette showing the 2004 recordings of drums, bass, and guitar for the remix.

== Actual Fantasy: Revisited ==
After remixing "Star Child" from his Star One album Space Metal in Pro Logic, and "Day 11: Love" from The Human Equation in 5.1, Arjen was very motivated and excited about making an entire album in 5.1. With a switch in record companies to Inside Out, there came a reprinting of all previous Ayreon albums; this proved an attractive opportunity to promote Actual Fantasy, the lowest-selling and most often overlooked Ayreon recording.

Originally, Actual Fantasy was recorded with a digital drum computer. Arjen had for some time wondered what the tracks would sound like with a real drummer, and as his collaborations with Gorefest drummer Ed Warby became more consistent over the years, the exciting yet intimidating idea developed. To remix the album in 5.1, certain sections had to be re-recorded, as they were lost in the subsequent eight years - this made the idea of using drums for the entire album an increasingly viable option.

The original intention with the album was to make it entirely electronic, which fit the themes found in the songs well. However, after discussing it with Ed, Arjen decided he would be remiss not to utilize Ed's abilities, and re-recorded the drum section. When the album was first released in 1996, prior to Ed's association with Arjen, Ed commented to people he knew that he felt the record should have utilized real drums.

== Track listing ==
All tracks are written by Arjen Anthony Lucassen.

| No. | Title | Length |
|---|---|---|
| 1. | "Actual Fantasy" | 1:33 |
| 2. | "Abbey of Synn" | 9:34 |
| 3. | "The Stranger from Within" | 7:40 |
| 4. | "Computer Eyes" | 7:27 |
| 5. | "Beyond the Last Horizon" | 7:35 |
| 6. | "Farside of the World" | 6:20 |
| 7. | "Back on Planet Earth" | 7:04 |
| 8. | "Forevermore" | 7:16 |

1998 reissue bonus tracks
| No. | Title | Length |
|---|---|---|
| 9. | "The Dawn of Man" | 7:32 |
| 10. | "The Stranger from Within" (Single version) | 3:38 |

== Personnel ==
- Okkie Huijsdens – vocals
- Edward Reekers – vocals
- Robert Soeterboek (Cotton Soeterboek Band) – vocals
- Cleem Determeijer – synth solo on tracks 3 and 4; orchestral and string arrangements on tracks 1, 3, 7, and 8
- Rene Merkelbach – Hammond, synth solo on track 2
- Floortje Schilt – violin
- Arjen Anthony Lucassen – all other instruments
- David Bachwitz – 'little boy' on track 1
- Kiki Holleman – 'baby' on track 8

=== Actual Fantasy: Revisited ===
- Ed Warby (Gorefest) – drums
- Peter Vink – bass guitar
- Ewa Albering – flute
- Astrid van der Veen – vocal sample on "Back on Planet Earth"

== Production ==
- Arranged and produced by Arjen Anthony Lucassen
- Recorded, engineered and mixed by Arjen Anthony Lucassen and Oscar Holleman

== References and footnotes ==
- "The Stranger From Within" page at Ayreon's official website
