= Universal Migrator Part 2: Flight of the Migrator =

Flight of the Migrator

Studio album by Ayreon
- Released: 20 June 2000
- Recorded: October 1999 – April 2000, The Electric Castle Studio
- Genre: Progressive metal; power metal; heavy metal; space rock
- Length: 65:34
- Label: Transmission; Inside Out; SPV
- Producer: Arjen Lucassen

Ayreon chronology
Universal Migrator Part 1: The Dream Sequencer (2000)	Flight of the Migrator (2000)	The Human Equation (2004)

Arjen Anthony Lucassen chronology
Universal Migrator Part 1: The Dream Sequencer (2000)	Universal Migrator Part 2: Flight of the Migrator (2000)	Ayreonauts Only (2000)

Universal Migrator Part 2: Flight of the Migrator is the fifth album from Ayreon, a progressive metal/rock opera project by Dutch musician Arjen Anthony Lucassen, released in 2000.

The musical styles found on Flight of the Migrator contrast its counterpart The Dream Sequencer, illustrating a wild, raucous journey through the tumultuous and chaotic reaches of outer space. In keeping with the setting of the story, the album's tone is much heavier, exuding a powerful, guitar-driven metal feel throughout.

Both albums were released simultaneously, sold well and were received positively. In 2004, Lucassen moved to a new record label - Inside Out Music - and with this move came re-issues of all the previous Ayreon releases, including The Dream Sequencer. The special edition re-issue merged both albums into a single release, titled Universal Migrator: Parts I & II. The album was also released on vinyl in December 2012.

As Universal Migrator had enough content to form a two-CD album, Lucassen decided to sell each disc as a separate release. He believed his fans to be fundamentally divided into two groups by genre of choice, being either progressive rock or heavy metal fans. The Dream Sequencer was meant to appeal to the prog enthusiasts, and Flight of the Migrator to the metal fans.

== Plot background ==
Flight of the Migrator continues the story of the final living human being, the colonist on Mars, and his decision to go even further back in time. Using the Dream Sequencer machine, he travels all the way back to just before the Universe was formed, theoretically before the Big Bang, when there was nothing but chaos. The colonist observes the creation of the very first soul, known as the Universal Migrator. It is from this soul that all others are formed, through a division of the original soul. Each resulting soul then travels off into the Universe to bring life in some form to the planet they inhabit.

The colonist follows the soul bound for Earth, as it travels through countless astronomical entities, such as quasars, pulsars, supernovas, eventually entering a black hole, traveling through a wormhole, and coming out the other side through a white hole directed towards the Solar System. The colonist's ambitious time travel subsequently overloads the Dream Sequencer, resulting in his death while hypnotized by the machine; however, his eternal self receives a message from the Migrator: "Eternity lies before you. You are the new Migrator!"

== Track analysis, historical notes and technical information ==
=== Chaos ===
The colonist travels back in time to before the Big Bang. The digitalised voices on this song were provided both by Lana Lane and Erik Norlander. Norlander also performs a synthesizer solo and Arjen Lucassen provides a guitar solo.

=== Dawn of a Million Souls ===
This song makes reference to the Big Bang itself, and according to Lucassen's fantasy, the primordial soul, the Universal Migrator — which subsequently divides into a million souls — is generated in this event. Vocals on this song were provided by Russell Allen and guitar solos were provided by Michael Romeo, both musicians are from Symphony X. Backing vocals were provided by Damian Wilson.

=== Journey on the Waves of Time ===
In this song, the colonist begins his search to the Earth along with the Migrator that goes to the Earth. Vocals on this song were provided by Ralf Scheepers (from Primal Fear) and Erik Norlander performs a Hammond organ solo.

=== To the Quasar ===
This song is divided in two movements, and its central theme are quasars, astronomical sources of electromagnetic energy which output massive amounts of light. A Quasar may readily release energy in levels equal to the output of dozens of average galaxies combined. In this song Arjen Lucassen adopts the most widely supported theory concerning the origin of quasars as true, that is, he implies they are gigantic supermassive black holes. Here, the colonist passes the Taurus Pulsar and goes to the center of Quasar 3C 273, hoping that its black hole will take him closer to Earth. Vocals on this song were provided by Andi Deris (from Helloween), Rene Merkelbach and Erik Norlander each perform a keyboard solo, and Arjen Lucassen provides a guitar solo. Backing vocals were provides by Lana Lane.

- First movement: The Taurus Pulsar

Pulsars are rotating neutron stars which are sources of electromagnetic radiation. This movement of the song speaks of a pulsar formerly located at the Taurus constellation, which imploded at some point in time.

- Second movement: Quasar 3C 273

3C 273 is a quasar located in the constellation of Virgo. It is the optically brightest quasar in our sky and was the first object to be identified as what we now know quasars to be — extremely luminous objects at cosmological distances, typically supermassive black holes powered by consuming the stars orbiting them.

=== Into the Black Hole ===
This song is divided in three movements, and its central theme are black holes. In this song, the colonist begins his travel through the black hole of 3C 273. Vocals on this song were provided by Bruce Dickinson (from Iron Maiden), Clive Nolan performs a synthesizer solo and Arjen Lucassen provides a guitar solo. Backing vocals were provided by Lana Lane.

- First movement: The Eye of the Universe
- Second movement: Halo of Darkness
- Third movement: The Final Door

=== Through the Wormhole ===
This song makes reference to wormholes. In physics, a wormhole is a hypothetical topological feature of spacetime that is essentially a shortcut through space and time, allowing matter to travel from one point to another much faster than it would normally be possible. Here, the colonist continues his journey through the black hole, getting closer to the Earth. Vocals on this song were provided by Fabio Lione from Rhapsody. Gary Wehrkamp (from Shadow Gallery) performs a synthesizer solo and a guitar solo. Backing vocals were provided by Lana Lane.

=== Out of the White Hole ===
This song is divided in three movements, and makes reference to several different concepts. Foremost, white holes are highly theoretical celestial bodies that spew out matter. In other words, they are anti-black holes, or the time reversal of black holes, and are the point in which matter which travels a black hole would exit. Finally, the colonist exits the black hole through a white hole and reaches the Andromeda Galaxy, passing through the fictional Planet Y, which is already populated. He decides to continue his search. Vocals on this song were provided by Timo Kotipelto (from Stratovarius and Kotipelto), Erik Norlander performs a synthesizer solo and Arjen Lucassen provides a guitar solo. The demo version of the song had vocals by Robert Soeterboek.

- First movement: M31

The Andromeda Galaxy — also known as M31 or Messier 31 — is a giant spiral galaxy which approaches us at about 300 kilometres per second, so it is one of the few blue shifted galaxies. It is unknown whether it will collide with the Milky Way galaxy, but if the impact is to happen, it is predicted to occur in about 3 billion years. In that case the two galaxies will merge to form a giant elliptical galaxy.

- Second movement: Planet Y

This movement makes reference to and is referenced by other Arjen Lucassen albums, the former Into the Electric Castle, and the latter 01011001. "Planet Y" is a fictional planet in which lives a being called Forever. "Remember Forever", the final sentence of the song, is the final sentence of Into The Electric Castle.

- Third movement: The Search Continues

=== To the Solar System ===
In this song, the colonist approaches the Solar System, but eventually dies as the oxygen on Mars runs out and the Dream Sequencer overheats. Vocals on this song were provided by Robert Soeterboek, who also wrote the vocal melody of the song and Arjen Lucassen provides a guitar solo. "Planet of Blue" is a metaphor that refers to the planet Earth.

- First movement: Planet Of Blue
- Second movement: System Alert

=== The New Migrator ===
Here, the colonist is told by the old Migrator that he is the new Migrator, and as his soul separates from his body, his new mission in the universe begins. Vocals on this song were provided by Ian Parry, who also wrote the lyrics. Keiko Kumagai (from Ars Nova) performs a synthesizer solo and a Hammond solo and Arjen Lucassen provides a guitar solo. Backing vocals were provided by Lana Lane. The song was mixed by Oscar Holleman. This song was originally composed by Lucassen and Parry during the time they were in the band Vengeance.

- First movement: Metamorphosis
- Second movement: Sleeper Awake

== Reception ==
Professional ratings
Review scores
Source	Rating
Allmusic	3/5 stars

AllMusic reviewer Glenn Astarita felt that Flight of the Migrator wasn't as good as its counterpart, saying that "Lucassen's applied concepts and compositional acumen fare much better on the highly recommended 'The Dream Sequencer'."

== Track listing ==
All lyrics are written by Arjen Anthony Lucassen, except track 8 by Lucassen/Robert Soeterboek and track 9 by Lucassen/Ian Parry; all music is composed by Lucassen.

No.	Title	Lead vocals	Length
1.	"Chaos"	Lana Lane (spoken only)	5:11
2.	"Dawn of a Million Souls"	Russell Allen with Damian Wilson	7:45
3.	"Journey on the Waves of Time"	Ralf Scheepers	5:48
4.	"To the Quasar": I. "The Taurus Pulsar"; II. "Quasar 3C273"	Andi Deris with Lane	8:43
5.	"Into the Black Hole": I. "The Eye of the Universe"; II. "Halo of Darkness"; III. "The Final Door"	Bruce Dickinson with Lane	10:25
6.	"Through the Wormhole"	Fabio Lione with Lane	6:05
7.	"Out of the White Hole": I. "M31"; II. "Planet Y"; III. "The Search Continues"	Timo Kotipelto	7:11
8.	"To the Solar System": I. "Planet of Blue"; II. "System Alert"	Robert Soeterboek	6:12
9.	"The New Migrator": I. "Metamorphosis"; II. "Sleeper Awake"	Ian Parry with Lane	8:17

== Personnel ==
=== Vocalists ===
- Lana Lane - voice on track 1; backing vocals on tracks 4, 5, 6, and 9
- Russell Allen (Symphony X) - track 2
- Damian Wilson (Threshold) - backing vocals on track 2
- Ralf Scheepers (Primal Fear) - track 3
- Andi Deris (Helloween) - track 4
- Bruce Dickinson (Iron Maiden) - track 5
- Fabio Lione (Rhapsody of Fire) - track 6
- Timo Kotipelto (Stratovarius) - track 7
- Robert Soeterboek - track 8
- Ian Parry (Elegy) - track 9
- Johan Edlund (Tiamat) – track 2

=== Instrumentalists ===
- Arjen Lucassen - electric and acoustic guitars, bass guitar, analog synthesizers, Mellotron, Hammond, additional keyboards; guitar solos on tracks 1, 4, 5, 7, 8, 9
- Ed Warby - drums
- Erik Norlander - analog synthesizers, vocoder, Taurus pedal, Hammond, additional keyboards; synth solos on tracks 1, 3 (Hammond), 4, 5, 7
- Michael Romeo - guitar solo on track 2
- Oscar Holleman - second guitar solo on track 4
- Gary Wehrkamp - guitar and synth solo on track 6
- Rene Merkelbach - last synth solo on track 4
- Clive Nolan - second synth solo on track 5
- Keiko Kumagai - synth solo on track 9 (plus Hammond)
- Peter Siedlach - strings

=== Technical ===
- Arjen Lucassen - producer
- Oscar Holleman - sound engineer
- Stephen van Haestregt - sound engineer
- Jacques Marcoux - sleeve design and layout

== Charts ==
Chart (2000)	Peak position
German Albums (Offizielle Top 100)	87
