= Vengeance (band) =

Dutch heavy metal band

- Origin: Waalwijk, Netherlands
- Genres: Hard rock, Heavy Metal
- Years active: 1983-1992, 1997-1998, 2006-present
- Labels: Sony Holland, CBS Records
- Spinoffs: Ayreon, Elegy
- Spinoff of: Bodine
- Members: Leon Goewie; Bram Engelen; Gert Nijboer; Johnny Dooms; John Emmen
- Past members: Arjen Anthony Lucassen; Ian Parry; Oscar Hollemann; Peter Verschurren; Jan Bijlsma; Roland Bakker; Paul Thissen; Matt Oligschlager; John Snels; Jan Somers (deceased); Barend Courbois; Peter Bourbon; Hans in 't Zandt; Emile Marcelis; Timo Somers
- Website: Official website

Vengeance is a hard rock band from the Netherlands formed in 1983 in Waalwijk. Arjen Anthony Lucassen, the head of Ayreon and other progressive metal projects, played in the band from its formation until 1992 when the band split up, after which he left to pursue a solo career. They later reformed on 1997.

Their guitarist, Jan Somers, who was born on 28 December 1964, died on 28 January 2011 in Mierlo, Netherlands, from a heart attack. He was 46 years old.

== Members ==
=== Current members ===
- Leon Goewie – lead vocals
- Gert Nijboer (ex-Picture, ex-Highway Chile, August Life) – guitar
- Bram Engelen (ex-OSTROGOTH) - guitar, backing vocals
- Johnny Dooms (ex-Powerplay) – bass guitar, backing vocals
- John Emmen – drums, backing vocals

=== Former members ===
- Ian Parry – lead vocals
- Arjen Anthony Lucassen - guitar
- Oscar Holleman – guitar
- Peer Verschuren - guitar
- Peter Bourbon - guitar
- Len Ruygrock - guitar
- Jan Somers - guitar
- Jan Bijlsma – bass guitar
- Barend Courbois - bass guitar
- Roland Bakker - keyboards
- Paul Thissen – drums
- Matt Olieschlager - drums
- John Snels - drums
- Hans in 't Zandt - drums
- Erik Stout - drums
- Emile Marcelis - bass
- Timo Somers - guitar, backing vocals

== Discography ==
=== Studio albums ===
- Vengeance (1984)
- We Have Ways to Make You Rock (1986)
- Take It or Leave It (1987)
- Arabia (1989)
- The Last of the Fallen Heroes (1994)
- Back from Flight 19 (1997)
- Back in the Ring (2006)
- Soul Collector (2009)
- Crystal Eye (2012)
- Piece of Cake (2013)

=== Live albums ===
- Same/Same... But Different (2007)

=== Compilation albums ===
- The Last Teardrop '84-'92 (1992)
- Rock'n Roll Shower '84-'98 (1998)
- Wings of an Arrow (2000)

=== Extended plays ===
- Only the Wind (1986)
- Rock N Roll Shower (1987)
- If Lovin' You is Wrong (1989)

=== Singles ===
- "Prisoners of the Night" (1984)
- "You Took Me By Surprise" (1985)
- "May Heaven Strike Me Down" (1986)
- "Only the Wind" / "Deathride to Glory" (1986)
- "Rock 'n' Roll Shower" / "Code of Honour" (1987)
- "Looks like a Winner" (1987)
- "Ain't Gonna Take You Home" (1987)
- "Arabia" (1989)
- "As the Last Teardrop Falls" (1992)
- "Planet Zilch" (1997)
- "Crazy Horses" (1998)
