= Bodine (band) =

Dutch heavy metal band

- Origin: The Hague, Netherlands
- Genres: Heavy metal
- Years active: 1978–1984
- Label: WEA
- Past members: Jay Van Feggelen – Vocals; Rheno Xeros – Guitar; Armand van der Hoff – Bass guitar Gerard Haitsma – Drums; Axel Jozef Langemeijer – Vocals; Iron Anthony – Guitar; Jeronimo – Bass guitar

Bodine was a Dutch heavy metal band which was active from 1978 until 1984.

The band released three albums: Bodine (1981), Bold as Brass (1982) and Three Times Running (1983). Bodine debuted with Jay van Feggelen as the vocalist, who performed as the Barbarian in the album Into the Electric Castle by Ayreon. The creator of Ayreon, Arjen Anthony Lucassen, tried becoming the lead singer of Bodine, but was added as a guitarist instead. The band is currently inactive. In 2012, Jay van Feggelen joined The Southside Blues Revue as lead singer under the alias Jay Bodean, a clear reference to his Bodine past.

== Discography ==
- Bodine (1981)
- Bold as Brass (1982)
- Three Times Running (1983)
