= Universal Migrator Part 1: The Dream Sequencer =

The Dream Sequencer

Studio album by Ayreon
- Released: 20 June 2000
- Recorded: March – November 1999, The Electric Castle Studio
- Genres: Progressive rock; space rock; folk rock; acoustic rock
- Length: 70:14
- Labels: Transmission; Inside Out; SPV
- Producer: Arjen Lucassen

Ayreon chronology
Into the Electric Castle (1998)	The Dream Sequencer (2000)	Universal Migrator Part 2: Flight of the Migrator (2000)

Singles from Universal Migrator Part 1: The Dream Sequencer
- 1. "Temple of the Cat" Released: 2000

Universal Migrator Part 1: The Dream Sequencer (sometimes simply referred as The Dream Sequencer) is a progressive rock album released in 2000 by Dutch multi-instrumentalist and songwriter Arjen Lucassen, and is the fourth album of his Ayreon project.

The Dream Sequencer features a musical style quite disparate from its counterpart Flight of the Migrator, telling the story of a trip through time from a variety of perspectives, it features a prog-infused atmospheric feeling, with a softer and more melodic sound than that of Flight of the Migrator.

Both albums were released simultaneously, sold well and were received positively. In 2004, Lucassen moved to a new record label - Inside Out Music - and with this move came re-issues of all the previous Ayreon releases, including The Dream Sequencer. The special edition re-issue merged both albums into a single release, titled Universal Migrator: Parts I & II. The album was also released on vinyl in December 2012.

== Creation ==
After the success of the previous Ayreon release, Into the Electric Castle, Arjen felt he had to create an album that was a worthy release all on its own, without being derivative or treading on similar ground. To this end, he made some fundamental changes to his previous composition process. Arjen decided to have each vocalist only sing one track each, as opposed to the almost conversational, rock opera-style singing which was utilized in previous albums.

As Universal Migrator had enough content to form a two-CD album, Arjen made a key decision to sell each disc as a separate release. He believed his fans to be fundamentally divided into two groups by genre of choice, being either progressive rock or heavy metal fans. The Dream Sequencer was meant to appeal to the prog enthusiasts, and Flight of the Migrator to the metal fans, so that each could simply purchase the album of their choice, if so inclined, but to his surprise, fans bought and loved both albums.

== Plot background ==
The story of The Dream Sequencer continues the plot found in The Final Experiment, starting in the year 2084, when the final world war wiped out all life on Earth. During the final years of fighting on Earth, a number of humans escaped to live on Mars. These people brought supplies with them, but with Earth ravaged, there was no way to replenish their resources, and soon almost all humans perished. The Dream Sequencer tells the story of the last human being alive, living alone on the Martian colony.

Born of the earliest settlers on Mars, the colonist never lived on Earth, and could only experience it through a machine known as the Dream Sequencer. Developed by scientists on Mars to curb boredom, the Dream Sequencer uses a form of hypnosis that allows the user to travel back in time to their youth, or even farther beyond, to previous incarnations of their persistent selves.

The colonist uses the machine and revisits his own youth, living on Mars, and eventually views many of his past lives: a woman fighting in the war of 2084, Queen Elizabeth I overlooking her fleet, a man present at the building of Stonehenge, and even the first human being to live on Earth, among other lives. Each track on The Dream Sequencer revisits one of these past lives.

== Track Analysis ==
=== The Dream Sequencer ===
The digitized voices on this song were provided by Lana Lane and Erik Norlander. This song is about the Colonist's preparation to use the Dream Sequencer, and the orders given by the machine. After the spoken words, the Dream Sequencer plays a background music (which is, in fact, the track "The Dream Sequencer") that, supposedly, finishes on the eleventh track, "The Dream Sequencer (Reprise)".

=== My House on Mars ===
Vocals on this song were provided by Johan Edlund (of Tiamat) and Floor Jansen (of After Forever). Edlund is also the composer of the song's vocal melody. The song is apparently about the main character of the story as a child, with his sister, mourning the death of his father in the war on Earth and its destruction in 2084. By the end of the song, he has forgiven his father for leaving him, and breaking his promise to take him to Earth.

=== 2084 ===
Vocals on this song were provided by Lana Lane. This song is about the war which ultimately leads to mankind's destruction, referenced in The Final Experiment, and later in 01011001. Still, the character speaking here is not the main protagonist himself, but one of his past lives (as told in "My House on Mars", the protagonist never saw Earth).

=== One Small Step ===
According to Arjen Lucassen, the song tells of the events he lived during the first crewed lunar landing—the Apollo 11 mission. It uses the famous words of Neil Armstrong, "That's one small step for a man, one giant leap for mankind". The song contains samples from the voices of astronauts, recorded during Moon landings. Vocals on this song were provided by Edward Reekers and backing vocals were provided by Lana Lane.

=== The Shooting Company of Captain Frans B. Cocq ===
This song makes reference to Captain Frans Banninck Cocq and his militia, immortalised on the painting The Night Watch by Dutch painter Rembrandt. The painting dates from the Dutch Golden Age, 1642. In the song's title, Arjen Lucassen makes use of a title which is considered the most accurate for the painting. Vocals on this song were provided by Mouse of Tuesday Child and backing vocals were provided by Lana Lane.

=== Dragon on the Sea ===
This song makes reference to Queen Elizabeth I of England and the "Speech to the Troops at Tilbury" given by her in July 1588, on the light of an attack by the Spanish Armada, which consisted of a grand naval fleet of 130 ships bearing over 30,000 men. The English fleet won the battle under the leadership of Sir Francis Drake—the "dragon" on the sea—and Charles Howard, 1st Earl of Nottingham. Vocals on this song were provided by Lana Lane. Erik Norlander is the writer of the song's lyrics.

=== Temple of the Cat ===
This song makes reference to the Mayan civilization and Maya mythology, taking place circa the 8th century. According to Arjen Lucassen, it speaks especially about the Jaguar Temple and the city of Tikal. Certain samples used on the song come from an authentic Maya festival. Vocals on this song were provided by Jacqueline Govaert of Krezip. Arjen Lucassen has stated that this is his least favorite Ayreon song.

=== Carried by the Wind ===
This song is influenced by Irish folk music, and makes reference to the blind minstrel Ayreon, protagonist of The Final Experiment. Vocals on this song were provided by Arjen Anthony Lucassen himself. According to the lyrics of the song, Ayreon's spirit notices that the Final Experiment has failed, and looks on to Mars for mankind's new hope. This "spirit on the wind" is also referenced in "The Sixth Extinction" on 01011001.

=== And the Druids Turn to Stone ===
This song makes reference to the Stonehenge, a monument located near Amesbury in the English county of Wiltshire, which is believed to have mainly been built between 2500 BCE and 2000 BCE. Due to the uncertainty regarding the origins of the monument, Arjen Lucassen proposes the fantasy explanation that a group of druids was turned to stone by means of magic, and thus became the Stonehenge. Vocals on this song were provided by Damian Wilson.

=== The First Man on Earth ===
This song makes reference to the appearance of the first Homo sapiens on Earth, circa 50,000 BCE. Vocals on this song were provided by Neal Morse (ex-frontman of Spock's Beard) and backing vocals were provided by Mark McCrite. Neal Morse, Erik Norlander and Arjen Anthony Lucassen are the composers of the song's lyrics.

=== The Dream Sequencer Reprise ===
This is an instrumental track. As no singer sings on this song, some fans believe that this song is the end of the background music played on "The Dream Sequencer" track, after the machine gave all the instructions to the Colonist. Thus, due to the song's end, it can be interpreted as if the Dream Sequencer is turned off. This idea is supported by the fact that, in the beginning of the next album, Flight of the Migrator, the Dream Sequencer speaks again some orders and warnings (there is no background music, the journey commences immediately).

== Reception ==
Professional ratings
Review scores
Source	Rating
Allmusic	4.5/5 stars

Allmusic reviewer Glenn Astarita praised the album, saying: "Basically, Lucassen's strong compositions and alluring arrangements strike an engaging chord as the music and overall production hearken back to the glory days of defiantly inventive progressive rock."

== Track listing ==
All lyrics are written by Arjen Anthony Lucassen except where noted; all music is composed by Lucassen except "My House on Mars" by Lucassen and Johan Edlund.

No.	Title	Vocals	Length
1.	"The Dream Sequencer"	Lana Lane	5:10
2.	"My House on Mars"	Johan Edlund, Floor Jansen	7:49
3.	"2084"	Lane	7:42
4.	"One Small Step"	Edward Reekers, Lane	8:46
5.	"The Shooting Company of Captain Frans B. Cocq"	Mouse, Lane	7:59
6.	"Dragon on the Sea" (Lucassen, Erik Norlander)	Lane	7:09
7.	"Temple of the Cat"	Jacqueline Govaert	4:11
8.	"Carried by the Wind"	Arjen Anthony Lucassen	3:59
9.	"And the Druids Turn to Stone"	Damian Wilson	6:37
10.	"The First Man on Earth" (Neal Morse, Erik Norlander, Lucassen)	Neal Morse, Mark McCrite	7:20
11.	"The Dream Sequencer Reprise"	instrumental	3:38

== Personnel ==
=== Vocalists ===
- Lana Lane – backing vocals on tracks 4 and 5, vocals on tracks 1, 3 and 6
- Johan Edlund (Tiamat) – track 2
- Floor Jansen (After Forever) – track 2
- Edward Reekers (Kayak) – track 4
- Mouse – track 5
- Jacqueline Govaert (Krezip) – track 7
- Arjen Lucassen – track 8
- Damian Wilson (Threshold) – track 9
- Neal Morse – track 10
- Mark McCrite – backing vocals on track 10

=== Instrumentalists ===
- Arjen Lucassen – electric and acoustic guitars, bass guitar, analog synthesizers, Mellotron, Hammond, and additional keyboards
- Rob Snijders – drums
- Erik Norlander – analog synthesizers, piano, vocoder, Hammond, and additional keyboards
- Clive Nolan – synth solo on track 3
- Peter Siedlach – strings

=== Technical ===
- Arjen Lucassen – producer
- Oscar Holleman – sound engineer
- Jef Bertels – cover art

== Charts ==
Chart (2000)	Peak position
German Albums (Offizielle Top 100)	90
