= 01011001 =

Studio album by Ayreon
- Released: 23 January 2008
- Recorded: April–November 2007
- Genre: Progressive metal; progressive rock
- Length: 102:16
- Label: Inside Out Music
- Producer: Arjen Lucassen

Ayreon chronology
The Human Equation (2004)	01011001 (2008)	Timeline (2008)

Arjen Anthony Lucassen chronology
Live in the Real World (2006)	01011001 (2008)	Elected (2008)

01011001 is the seventh studio album by Arjen Anthony Lucassen's long-running Ayreon project. The title is the binary representation of the ASCII value of the letter Y.

01011001 is a concept album that tells the story of aliens called the "Forever", who create humanity, only to later endanger it by providing it with technology.

Seventeen singers in total, including Lucassen himself, contributed to the album, more than any other Ayreon album. Apart from Lucassen, only Anneke van Giersbergen (ex-The Gathering) and Floor Jansen (After Forever, Nightwish) had sung on previous Ayreon albums, on Into the Electric Castle and Universal Migrator Part 1: The Dream Sequencer respectively.

It also stars, among others, Bob Catley from Magnum, Hansi Kürsch from Blind Guardian, Jørn Lande, and Steve Lee from Gotthard in his final guest appearance before his death in 2010. The album was a commercial and critical success.

== Reception ==
Professional ratings
Review scores
Source	Rating
About.com	4/5 stars
AllMusic	3.5/5 stars
Dangerdog.com	4.5/5 stars
Melodic.net	3/5 stars
Metal Storm	7/10 stars
Metal Storm (2)	9.5/10 stars
Record Collector	3/5 stars

AllMusic reviewer Cosmo Lee praised the album, saying that it has "pristine production [and] byzantine songs that feel like full albums." He went on to say that "Music this over the top almost defies criticism. Reviewing it is like reviewing the world's tallest building. It doesn't care; it just goes on and on." Exclaim's Laura Wiebe Taylor felt that the album had some great songs, such as "Liquid Eternity" and "E=mc^{2}," but that some of the other songs were weaker, including "Newborn Race" and "Web of Lies." She concluded her review by saying that "ultimately, 01011001 is a hard rock extravaganza."

Chad Bower, in his review for About.com, said that 01011001 "has something for everyone," and that the album is "a musical tour de force that takes the listener on a musical journey with an interesting storyline and very well-written songs." Record Collector's Tim Jones noted the differing styles of the album's songs, saying that "The Truth is in Here" is similar to the music of Blackmore's Night, that "River of Time" is reminiscent of Jethro Tull, and that "Beneath the Waves" reminded him of Pink Floyd.

== Track listing ==
All lyrics are written by Arjen Anthony Lucassen; all music is composed by Lucassen except Anneke van Giersbergen who wrote her own vocal melodies in tracks 1 (disc 1) and 2 (disc 2), and Jonas Renkse who wrote his own vocal melodies in tracks 1 (disc 1), 2, 4 and 7 (disc 2).

CD 1 – "Y"
No.	Title	Vocalists	Length
1.	"Age of Shadows" I. "Age of Shadows" II. "We are Forever" III. "Age of Shadows (reprise)"	Tom Englund, Steve Lee, Daniel Gildenlöw, Hansi Kürsch, Floor Jansen, Jonas P. Renkse, Anneke van Giersbergen, Jørn Lande	10:47
2.	"Comatose"	van Giersbergen, Lande	4:26
3.	"Liquid Eternity"	Renkse, Gildenlöw, Magali Luyten, Bob Catley, Englund, Lande, Jansen	8:10
4.	"Connect the Dots"	Ty Tabor, Arjen Anthony Lucassen	4:13
5.	"Beneath the Waves" I. "Beneath the Waves" II. "Face the Facts" III. "But a Memory..." IV. "World Without Walls" V. "Reality Bleeds"	Gildenlöw, Catley, van Giersbergen, Jansen, Lee, Lande, Kürsch, Englund	8:26
6.	"Newborn Race" I. "The Incentive" II. "The Vision" III. "The Procedure" IV. "Another Life" V. "Newborn Race" VI. "The Conclusion"	Gildenlöw, Jansen, Englund, Renkse, Catley, Kürsch, Lande	7:49
7.	"Ride the Comet"	Lande, Jansen, Englund, Renkse, Catley, Luyten	3:29
8.	"Web of Lies"	Simone Simons, Phideaux Xavier	2:50
Total length:			50:13

CD 2 – "Earth"
No.	Title	Vocalists	Length
1.	"The Fifth Extinction" I. "Glimmer of Hope" II. "World of Tomorrow Dreams" III. "Collision Course" IV. "From the Ashes" V. "Glimmer of Hope (reprise)"	van Giersbergen, Catley, Lee, Lande, Englund, Gildenlöw, Kürsch, Renkse, Jansen	10:29
2.	"Waking Dreams"	Renkse, van Giersbergen	6:31
3.	"The Truth Is in Here"	Lucassen, Liselotte Hegt	5:12
4.	"Unnatural Selection"	Englund, Lee, Lande, Catley, Kürsch, Renkse	7:15
5.	"River of Time"	Kürsch, Catley	4:24
6.	"E=mc^{2}"	Wudstik, Marjan Welman	5:50
7.	"The Sixth Extinction" I. "Echoes on the Wind" II. "Radioactive Grave" III. "2085" IV. "To the Planet of Red" V. "Spirit on the Wind" VI. "Complete the Circle"	Englund, Lee, Kürsch, Gildenlöw, Jansen, Renkse, Catley, Lande, van Giersbergen	12:18
Total length:			52:02

== Personnel ==
Vocalists

- Bob Catley (Magnum) – Forever
- Tom S. Englund (Evergrey) – Forever
- Anneke van Giersbergen (ex-The Gathering) – Forever
- Daniel Gildenlöw (Pain of Salvation) – Forever
- Floor Jansen (Nightwish | ex-After Forever) – Forever
- Hansi Kürsch (Blind Guardian) – Forever
- Jørn Lande (ex-Masterplan) – Forever
- Steve Lee (Gotthard) – Forever
- Magali Luyten – Forever
- Jonas Renkse (Katatonia) – Forever
- Arjen Anthony Lucassen – Mr. L on "The Truth Is in Here", and backing vocals on "Connect the Dots"
- Liselotte Hegt (Dial) – Mr. L's nurse on "The Truth Is in Here"
- Simone Simons (Epica) – Simone on "Web of Lies"
- Ty Tabor (King's X) – an average middle-class worker on "Connect the Dots"
- Marjan Welman (Autumn) – a 21st-century scientist on "E=mc^{2}"
- Wudstik – a 21st-century scientist on "E=mc^{2}"
- Phideaux Xavier – PX on "Web of Lies"

Instrumentalists

- Tomas Bodin (The Flower Kings) – synthesizer solo on "Waking Dreams"
- Joost van den Broek (After Forever) – synthesizer solo and piano on "The Sixth Extinction"
- David Faber – cellos
- Jeroen Goossens – flute; soprano and tenor recorder on "The Truth Is in Here"; bass flute on "Unnatural Selection"; tin whistle on "River of Time"
- Lori Linstruth – guitar solo on "Newborn Race"
- Arjen Anthony Lucassen – electric and acoustic guitars, bass guitars, mandolin, keyboards, synthesizers, Hammond, and Solina
- Ben Mathot – violins
- Michael Romeo (Symphony X) – guitar solo on "E=mc^{2}"
- Derek Sherinian (ex-Dream Theater) – synthesizer solo on "The Fifth Extinction"
- Ed Warby – drums and percussion

Production

- Arjen Anthony Lucassen – recording, production, mixing, and mastering
- Joost van den Broek – engineering assistant
- Jef Bertels – cover painting
- Yvette Boertje – image for "The Truth Is in Here"
- Felipe Machado Franco – lay-out and illustrations
- Simone van Vegten – 3D illustrations

== Charts ==
Chart (2008)	Peak position
Belgian Albums Chart (Flanders)	80
Belgian Albums Charts (Wallonia)	96
Dutch Album Chart	2
French Albums Chart	90
German Albums Chart	18
Swedish Albums Chart	54
Swiss Albums Chart	85
