= The Final Experiment =

Studio album by Ayreon
- Released: 27 October 1995
- Recorded: 1995
- Studios: Studio "RS 29" (Waalwijk, Netherlands)
- Genres: Progressive metal; progressive rock; folk metal
- Length: 71:17
- Labels: Transmission; Inside Out; SPV
- Producer: Arjen Anthony Lucassen

Ayreon chronology
The Final Experiment (1995)	Actual Fantasy (1996)

Arjen Anthony Lucassen chronology
Pools of Sorrow, Waves of Joy (1994)	The Final Experiment (1995)	Actual Fantasy (1996)

The Final Experiment is the debut studio album by the Dutch progressive metal project Ayreon, released in 1995. Originally released with no artist noted as Ayreon: The Final Experiment, the unexpected success of the album lead project leader Arjen Anthony Lucassen to detach the "Ayreon" name and use it as the project's name for subsequent releases at the suggestion of the record label.

The album focuses on the character of Ayreon, a blind minstrel in 6th century Britain who receives visions of the end of the world and attempts to warn King Arthur's court of the threat; unlike future Ayreon releases, characters are not each voiced by a single singer, with several alternating as Ayreon and other characters over the course of the story. The Final Experiment introduces several concepts which appear in future Ayreon albums, such as humanity's propensity for war, pollution, and the gratuitous use of technology in human society. The end of the world witnessed by the character of Ayreon plays a key role in the overall storyline featured in following albums, and the character himself is referenced multiple times in later albums.

In 2004, after Lucassen moved to a new record label, Inside Out, he re-released The Final Experiment with a bonus disk featuring nine new versions of songs from the original version with different singers and mostly acoustic instrumentation.

== Creation ==
After leaving Vengeance in 1992, Arjen began working on writing and recording solo material, with his newfound creative freedom. Finding motivation to commercialize the new music from his record company, Arjen released his first solo album in 1993 under his middle name, Anthony, entitled Pools of Sorrow, Waves of Joy. The album lacked a musical direction, and became a heterogeneous mixture of styles and genres. While the album was not commercially successful, it formed the groundwork for the Ayreon project to come.

A number of albums from the 1960s and 70s featuring common stylistic threads made a lifelong impact on Arjen. The dynamic and exciting music, emotionally driven lyrics, and an ensemble cast found in albums such as Andrew Lloyd Webber's Jesus Christ Superstar and The Who's Tommy, commonly referred to as rock operas, inspired Arjen to create one of his own. Working in an environment where he could develop an album exactly as he wanted, Arjen intended to create his vision, making no compromises along the way. His vision manifested itself in The Final Experiment and, after being rejected by several different record labels, was picked up by a small Dutch record label. The project was financially burdensome, but through some subsidization in the form of a "very large amount of money" from Arjen's father, it was seen through to completion, and was successful enough to warrant another Ayreon release.

== Concept ==
=== Prologue ===
In the year 2084 scientists have found a way to send messages back into time using time telepathy. With the Earth nearly destroyed by many different causes, they have one hope for the experiment: warn the past of the future to avert the fate of Earth.

=== Act I ===
The receiver of the telepathic messages is Ayreon, a blind minstrel living in 6th century Britain. He’s lived his life in darkness from the day he was born, but one fateful day everything changes — Ayreon can see images. The minstrel believes these visions are sent to him by the Lords of Time. Unaware of how much time there is left before Earth is destroyed Ayreon sets out to tell the tale of Earth’s demise singing songs of wars, natural disaster, and computer technology. The terrifying tales frighten the villagers who run him out of town.

=== Act II ===
Alone, and cast out of his village, Ayreon goes to King Arthur’s castle, and, being a famed minstrel, he is allowed to sing of his visions in the King’s very own court.

=== Act III ===
Jealous of his ability to foresee the future, Merlin, the court’s wizard, isn’t pleased with Ayreon’s message, convincing the court the minstrel must be a fake.

=== Act IV ===
Merlin believes it is necessary to silence Ayreon forever and curses him. With the curse completed Merlin realizes his error, but it is too late. The wizard then predicts that the message will arrive in the mind of another minstrel at the end of the 20th century.

== Track listing ==
All tracks are written by Arjen Anthony Lucassen.

No.	Title	Vocals	Length
1.	"Prologue" I. "The Time Telepathy Experiment" II. "Overture" III. "Ayreon's Quest"	Edward Reekers	3:16
Total length:			3:16

Act I: The Dawning
No.	Title	Vocals	Length
2.	"The Awareness" I. "The Premonition" ( 0:00 - 1:21 ) II. "Dreamtime (Words Become a Song)" ( 1:21 - 4:07 ) III. "The Awakening ( 4:07 - 6:36 )"	Edward Reekers	6:36
3.	"Eyes of Time" I. "Eyes of Time" ( 0:00 - 3:30 ) II. "Brainwaves ( 3:33 - 5:05 )"	Lenny Wolf	5:05
4.	"The Banishment" I. "A New Dawn" ( 0:00 - 1:25 ) II. "The Gathering" ( 1:26 - 3:13 ) III. "The Accusation" ( 3:14 - 6:07 ) IV. "The Banishment" ( 6:08 - 9:46 ) V. "Oblivion ( 9:47 - 11:08 )"	Jan-Chris de Koeijer, Robert Soeterboek	11:08
Total length:			22:49

Act II: King Arthur's Court
No.	Title	Vocals	Length
5.	"Ye Courtyard Minstrel Boy"	Ian Parry	2:45
6.	"Sail Away to Avalon"	Barry Hay	4:02
7.	"Nature's Dance"	Arjen Anthony Lucassen	2:27
Total length:			9:14

Act III: Visual Echoes
No.	Title	Vocals	Length
8.	"Computer-Reign (Game Over)"	Ian Parry	3:24
9.	"Waracle"	Jay Van Feggelen	6:44
10.	"Listen to the Waves"	Arjen Anthony Lucassen	4:58
11.	"Magic Ride"	Arjen Anthony Lucassen	3:35
Total length:			18:41

Act IV: Merlin's Will and Ayreon's Fate
No.	Title	Vocals	Length
12.	"Merlin's Will"	Leon Goewie	3:20
13.	"The Charm of the Seer"	Ruud Houweling, Lucy Hillen	4:11
14.	"Swan Song"		2:44
15.	"Ayreon's Fate I. "Ayreon's Fate" ( 0:00 - 2:32 ) II. "Merlin's Prophecy" ( 2:32 - 5:23 ) III. "Epilogue ( 5:23 - 6:55 )"	Arjen Anthony Lucassen, Edward Reekers, Ian Parry, Jay van Feggelen, Leon Goewie, Robert Soeterboek, Debby Schreuder, Mirjam van Doorn	6:55
Total length:			17:10

Semi-acoustic bonus disc (2005 Special Edition release only)
No.	Title	Vocals	Length
1.	"Dreamtime"	Astrid van der Veen	4:19
2.	"Eyes of Time"	Ruud Houweling	3:25
3.	"The Accusation"	Rodney Blaze	3:49
4.	"Ye Courtyard Minstrel Boy"	Esther Ladiges	2:50
5.	"Sail Away to Avalon"	John Jaycee Cuijpers	3:26
6.	"Nature's Dance"	Peter Daltrey	2:03
7.	"Waracle"	Marcela Bovio	5:16
8.	"Merlin's Will"	Irene Jansen	3:29
9.	"The Charm of the Seer"	Robby Valentine	3:29
Total length:			37:41

== Personnel ==
Ayreon

- Arjen Anthony Lucassen – vocals (tracks 7, 10, 11 & 15), guitar, bass, keyboards, synthesizer, drums, percussion, timpani, audio mixing, sleeve design & photography

Vocalists

- Barry Hay on "Sail Away To Avalon"
- Edward Reekers as Merlin on "Prologue," "The Awareness" and "Ayreon’s Fate;" as Ayreon on "The Awareness" and "Ayreon’s Fate"
- Ian Parry as Nobleman on "Ye Courtyard Minstrel Boy", "Computer Reign" and as Merlin on "Ayreon’s Fate"
- Jan-Chris de Koeijer on "The Banishment"
- Jay van Feggelen of Bodine as Merlin on "Ayreon's Fate" and "Waracle"
- Lenny Wolf on "Eyes Of Time"
- Leon Goewie as Merlin on "Merlin's Will" and "Ayreon's Fate"
- Robert Soeterboek as Villagers on "The Banishment" and as Merlin on "Ayreon's Fate"
- Ruud Houweling as Ayreon on "The Charm Of The Seer"
- Lucy Hillen on "The Charm Of The Seer;" as Chorus on several tracks
- Debby Schreuder as Merlin, Women and Villagers on "Ayreon's Fate;" as Chorus on several tracks
- Mirjam van Doorn as Merlin, Women and Villagers on "Ayreon's Fate;" as Chorus on several tracks
- Irene Jansen (bonus)
- Marcela Bovio (bonus)
- Peter Daltrey (bonus)
- John "Jaycee" Cuijpers (bonus)
- Esther Ladiges (bonus)
- Rodney Blaze (bonus)
- Astrid van der Veen (bonus)
- Valentine (bonus)

Keyboards

- Cleem Determeijer (tracks 2–6, 14)
- Rene Merkelbach (tracks 4, 6, 11, 12)

Drums

- Ernst van Ee (tracks 2–4, 6–10, 12, 15)
- Davy Mickers

Bass

- Peter Vink – acoustic bass (tracks 3–4, 7–8)
- Jolanda Verduijn (tracks 4, 6, 15)
- Jan Bijlsma (track 11)

Cello

- Marieke van der Heyden
- Dewi Kerstens

Artwork

- Ruud Houweling
- Richèle Nijst
- Jacoby Peters

Designs

- Richele Nijst – additional
- Jacoby Peeters – additional
- Ruud Houweling – sleeve

Miscellaneous

- Ewa Albering – flute
- Lori Linstruth – electric lead guitar solos
- Jeroen Goossens – assorted wind instruments
- Valentine – piano, vocals
- Oscar Holleman – engineering
- Sjoerd Kops – photography
- Peter Brussee – mastering
- Oscar Holleman – production, mixing & engineering
