= Into the Electric Castle =

Studio album by Ayreon
- Released: 31 October 1998
- Studio: The Electric Castle, Netherlands; RS29, Waalwijk, Netherlands; The Funny Farm, East Lothian, Scotland
- Genre: Progressive metal; progressive rock; space rock
- Length: 104:35
- Label: Transmission
- Producer: Arjen Anthony Lucassen

Ayreon chronology
Actual Fantasy (1996)	Into the Electric Castle (1998)	Universal Migrator Part 1: The Dream Sequencer (2000)

Arjen Anthony Lucassen chronology
Strange Hobby (1996)	Into the Electric Castle (1998)	Universal Migrator Part 1: The Dream Sequencer (2000)

Into the Electric Castle – A Space Opera is the third album of the progressive metal project Ayreon by Dutch singer, songwriter, producer and multi-instrumentalist Arjen Anthony Lucassen. Released in 1998, it was the band's first double album.

Like most Ayreon albums, it is a concept album, taking place in the same fictional universe as Ayreon's first album The Final Experiment. Into the Electric Castle follows eight characters from different locations and time periods, who inexplicably find themselves in a strange place where they follow a mysterious voice to reach the Electric Castle to survive. Each character, made bombastically flamboyant with influence from B movies, is voiced by a different singer. Into the Electric Castle is the first collaboration between Lucassen and Ed Warby, who has since become Lucassen's most regular collaborator, playing drums on every following Ayreon album except Universal Migrator Part 1: The Dream Sequencer and Transitus and on most of his other projects.

The album was a commercial success and received overwhelmingly positive reviews from music critics. Lucassen released a remixed version of the album in 2018, followed by a live album featuring a full live performance of the album, titled Electric Castle Live and Other Tales, in 2020.

== Background ==
After the previous Ayreon album, Actual Fantasy, sold below expectations, Lucassen sought to deliver a top-quality recording with Into the Electric Castle. If the album had not been a success, he said that he would have no longer have continued the Ayreon project. It remains his highest selling album to date, with The Human Equation being a close second.

== Plot ==
The story begins with a strange voice (Peter Daltrey) calling out to the eight characters that are taken from various planes of time. The mysterious voice tells them they are in a place of "no-time and no space". Urging them to continue, the voice gives them a task: to reach The Electric Castle and find out what's inside.

After various steps, they come to the Decision Tree where the voice tells them one of them must die. They must then go through the Tunnel of Light, but the Highlander (Fish) refuses to reach the light, stays behind, accepts his death slowly, and lays himself down to die while the others continue. Then in the Garden of Emotions, the Egyptian (Anneke van Giersbergen), overwhelmed by her emotions, becomes convinced that Amon-Ra is coming to seal her fate. She loses her will to continue and wanders alone until she lays herself down and dies as well.

The surviving characters finally reach the Electric Castle, penetrating the Castle Hall. On the Tower of Hope a breeze draws the attention of the Indian (Sharon den Adel), luring her away towards the sun despite the warning of the Knight (Damian Wilson) and the Futureman (Edward Reekers). On the breeze, she encounters Death itself (George Oosthoek and Robert Westerholt) who takes her while she screams.

The characters then come to their final test: the voice tells them that beyond them stand two gates, with one of them leading to oblivion and the second to the desired time of the heroes. One of the gates is old, deteriorated, and ugly, and the other made of gold and appears at first glance to be paradise. The Barbarian (Jay van Feggelen), in his arrogance and pride, walks through the golden gate in spite of his companion's choice, and falls into oblivion forever.

Finally, the Knight, the Roman (Edwin Balogh), the Hippie (Arjen Anthony Lucassen) and the Futureman, who had chosen the right gate, discover the true nature of the voice: it is called "Forever of the Stars", and claims that its kind is an alien race who lost all emotions. It also claims its kind caused the emergence of humanity on Earth, and that the eight heroes were in an experiment in understanding and/or rediscovering emotions. Feeling tired, the voice tells them to go on ahead and open the door, and that they won't remember what has happened.

Back in their real time, the heroes all wonder what has happened, with the Hippie asking himself if this journey was the result of his drug abuse, the Futureman wondering if his memory has been erased, the Roman feeling stronger and the Knight thinking he found the Grail in a magic dream. The voice of the Forever of the Stars is then heard, asking them all to remember Forever.

== Reception ==
Professional ratings
Review scores
Source	Rating
AllMusic	4/5 stars
Blistering	8/10
Collector's Guide to Heavy Metal	8/10
Sputnikmusic	4.5/5 stars

Into the Electric Castle received overwhelmingly positive reviews from critics, who praised Lucassen's writing and composition abilities and the performances of the singers. A Sputnikmusic reviewer stated "if you’re a fan of progressive metal, or even progressive music in general, your collection will not be complete without Into the Electric Castle". AllMusic reviewer Robert Taylor praised the album, saying that "The massive coordination of such a large project is admirable, but to pull it off with such impressive results is stunning."

In 2025, it was ranked by Loudwire as the 3rd best progressive metal album of the 1990s.

== Track listing ==
All tracks are written by Arjen Anthony Lucassen, with singers Peter Daltrey, Jay van Feggelen, Fish, and Anneke van Giersbergen writing some lyrics for their respective characters.

Disc one
No.	Title	Length
1.	"Welcome to the New Dimension"	3:05
2.	"Isis and Osiris": I. "Let the Journey Begin"; II. "The Hall of Isis and Osiris"; III. "Strange Constellations"; IV. "Reprise"	11:11
3.	"Amazing Flight": I. "Amazing Flight in Space"; II. "Stardance"; III. "Flying Colours"	10:15
4.	"Time Beyond Time"	6:05
5.	"The Decision Tree (We're Alive)"	6:24
6.	"Tunnel of Light"	4:05
7.	"Across the Rainbow Bridge"	6:20
Total length:		47:25

Disc two
No.	Title	Length
1.	"The Garden of Emotions": I. "All in the Garden of Emotions"; II. "Voices in the Sky"; III. "The Aggression Factor"	9:40
2.	"Valley of the Queens"	2:25
3.	"The Castle Hall"	5:49
4.	"Tower of Hope"	4:54
5.	"Cosmic Fusion": I. "Soar on the Breeze"; II. "Death's Grunt"; III. "The Passing of an Eagle"	7:27
6.	"The Mirror Maze": I. "Inside the Mirror Maze"; II. "Through the Mirror"	6:34
7.	"Evil Devolution"	6:31
8.	"The Two Gates"	6:28
9.	""Forever" of the Stars"	2:02
10.	"Another Time, Another Space"	5:20
Total length:		57:10

== Personnel ==
Vocalists

- Edwin Balogh – Roman
- Sharon den Adel – Indian
- Jay van Feggelen – Barbarian
- Fish – Highlander
- Anneke van Giersbergen – Egyptian
- Arjen Anthony Lucassen – Hippie
- Edward Reekers – Futureman
- Damian Wilson – Knight
- Robert Westerholt and George Oosthoek – Death
- Peter Daltrey – the Voice

Production

- Arjen Anthony Lucassen – producing, mixing
- Oscar Holleman – mixing
- John van den Oetelaar – layout and image handling
- Thomas Ewerhard – additional layout for the special edition
- Jef Bertels – cover art and all other paintings
- Peter van 't Riet – mastering
- John Verheijen – scanning

Instrumentalists

- Arjen Anthony Lucassen – all electric and acoustic guitars, mandolin, bass, minimoog, mellotron and keyboards
- Ed Warby – drums
- Roland Bakker – hammonds
- Robby Valentine – all pianos, synth solos on "Isis and Osiris, I. Let The Journey Begin", "Amazing Flight, I. Amazing Flight in Space", and "Tower of Hope", Mellotron "The Mirror Maze, I. Inside the Mirror Maze"
- Ernő Oláh – violins
- Taco Kooistra – cellos
- Jack Pisters – sitar
- Rene Merkelbach – synth solos on "The Decision Tree (We're Alive)" and "Evil Devolution" and harpsichord on "Valley of the Queens"
- Clive Nolan – synth solos on "Amazing Flight, III. Flying Colours"
- Ton Scherpenzeel – synth solos on "Cosmic Fusion, III. The Passing of an Eagle"
- Thijs van Leer – flute on "Amazing Flight, III. Flying Colours", "Time Beyond Time", "Valley of the Queens", and "The Castle Hall"
