= Dirk Bruinenberg =

- Born: Dirk J. Bruinenberg; 21 August 1968 (age 58)
- Origin: Nieuwerkerk aan den IJssel, Netherlands
- Genres: Progressive metal, power metal, thrash metal
- Occupation: Musician
- Instrument: Drums

Dirk Bruinenberg (born 21 August 1968) is a Dutch musician known as the former drummer of several European progressive metal and power metal bands, including: Elegy, Ian Parry's Consortium Project and Adagio. He is often recognized for his intricate drumming style and technical double bass patterns.

In the late 1980s and early 90s, Bruinenberg played with Dutch thrash metal bands Abyss and Vulture. Subsequently, he joined Elegy in 1993, replacing original drummer Ed Warby of Gorefest. He recorded seven albums with Elegy until 2002. The band toured throughout Europe and Japan alongside Stratovarius, Kamelot, Annihilator, Phantom Blue, The Gathering, Gorefest and others.

After Elegy, Bruinenberg joined French progressive metal band Adagio with whom he recorded their first two albums. He left the band in late 2003, citing personal reasons coupled with conflicting schedules. His performance in Adagio has been critically acclaimed due mainly to the high complexity of the music.

Bruinenberg is also featured as a guest drummer on Kamelot's The Fourth Legacy and continues recording and performing with several other artists, including: Kristoffer Gildenlöw (Dial, Pain of Salvation, Lana Lane), David Readman (Pink Cream 69), Ebony Ark, The 11th Hour, Maiden uniteD and Bob Catley (Magnum).

In 2013 he was announced as the new drummer of the melodic rock project Place Vendome. Bruinenberg currently plays with the new Dutch melodic rock band 7 Miles to Pittsburgh (with ex Elegy bass player, Martin Helmantel) and with the solo band of former Elegy bandmate Patrick Rondat.

== Discography and appearances ==
=== Vulture ===
- Fatal Games (1990)
- Easier To Lie (1993)

=== Elegy ===
- Supremacy (1994)
- Lost (1995)
- Primal Instinct (EP) (1996)
- State Of Mind (1997)
- Manifestation Of Fear (1998)
- Forbidden Fruit (2000)
- Principles Of Pain (2002)

=== Consortium Project ===
- Ian Parry's Consortium Project (1999)
- Continuum In Extremis (2001)

=== Adagio ===
- Sanctus Ignis – (8 May 2001)
- Underworld – (23 July 2003)

=== Patrick Rondat ===
- An Ephemeral World (2004)
- Live (2005)
- Escape From Shadows (2025)

=== Bob Catley ===
- Immortal (2008)

=== Place Vendome ===
- Thunder in the Distance (2013)
- Close to the Sun (2017)

=== 7 Miles to Pittsburgh ===
- Revolution On Hold (2019)
- Beyond Repair (2026)

=== Kamelot ===
- The Fourth Legacy (1999)

=== Ebony Ark ===
- Decoder 2.0 (2006) (uncredited)

=== Dial ===
- Synchronized (2007)

=== David Readman ===
- David Readman (2007)

=== Fergie Frederiksen ===
- Happiness is the Road (2011)

=== Damian Wilson|DWB ===
- 20 years of avoiding a job (2011)

=== Schwertmann ===
- Theater Of Grief (2021)

=== Breaking The Chains ===
- We Are Breaking The Chains (2018)

=== Maiden United ===
- The Barrel House Tapes (2019)
- Sailors Of The Sky ( live in europe) (2021)
- The Ionian Sea (2025)

=== Kristoffer Gildenlöw ===
- Homebound (2020)
- Let Me Be a Ghost (2021)
- Empty (2023)

=== Wicked Sensation ===
- Crystalized (2010)
- Adrenaline Rush (2014)

=== Structure ===
- Disordered (2022)
- Heritage (2025)
