= For All We Know (Ruud Jolie album) =

Studio album
- Released: 25 April 2011
- Genre: Progressive metal
- Length: 58:26
- Language: English
- Producer: Ruud Jolie

For All We Know is Ruud Jolie’s solo project. Jolie is best known for being the guitarist for Within Temptation. Written over a four-year period this album contains 12 original songs and features several guest musicians.

== Track listing ==
1. Blind Me (4:08)
2. Busy Being Somebody Else (5:30)
3. Out of Reach (6:02)
4. When Angels Refuse to Fly (5:42)
5. I Lost Myself Today (4:31)
6. Keep Breathing (1:56)
7. Down On My Knees (9:02)
8. Save Us... (3:48)
9. Embrace/Erase/Replace/Embrace (2:52)
10. Tired and Ashamed (5:27)
11. Open Your Eyes (5:20)
12. Nothing More... (4:08)

All music and lyrics written by Ruud Jolie except “Blind Me”, music written by Wudstik.
Arrangements by Ruud Jolie. Vocal harmony arrangements by Ruud Jolie and Wudstik.
Produced by Ruud Jolie

== Personnel ==
- Wudstik – vocals
- Ruud Jolie – guitar
- Kristoffer Gildenlöw – bass
- Léo Margarit – drums
- Thijs Schrijnemakers – Hammond
- Marco Kuypers – Rhodes and piano

=== Guest musicians ===
- Daniel Gildenlöw – vocals
- Sharon den Adel – vocals
- Ruud Houweling – vocals
- Damian Wilson – vocals
- Anke Derks – vocals
- Tom Sikkers – vocals
- John Wesley – guitar
- Richie Faulkner – guitar
