= BE (Original Stage Production) =

"BE" (Original Stage Production)

Live album by Pain of Salvation
- Released: 26 April 2005
- Recorded: 12 September 2003
- Studio: Lokomotivet; Eskilstuna, Sweden
- Genre: Progressive metal
- Length: DVD: 78:49; CD: 69:39
- Label: InsideOut Music
- Producer: Jonas Burman (SMT), Daniel Gildenlöw

Pain of Salvation chronology
12:5 (2004)	"BE" (Original Stage Production) (2005)	Scarsick (2007)

Professional ratings
Review scores
Source	Rating
AllMusic	2/5 stars

"BE" (Original Stage Production) is the second live album by Swedish progressive metal band Pain of Salvation, documenting one of the performances of their 2004 album BE in its entirety in Eskilstuna, Sweden, on 12 September 2003. In contrast to the studio album, The Orchestra of Eternity (a nine-piece orchestra accompanying the band) are given credit on the front cover of the album (though they weren't shown on the initial promo release).

== Track listing ==
All music by Daniel Gildenlöw, except "Iter Impius" by Fredrik Hermansson.

1. "Animae Partus"
2. "Deus Nova"
3. "Imago"
4. "Pluvius Aestivus"
5. "Lilium Cruentus"
6. "Nauticus"
7. "Dea Pecuniae"
8. "Vocari Dei"
9. "Diffidentia"
10. "Nihil Morari"
11. "Latericius Valete"
12. "Omni"
13. "Iter Impius"
14. "Martius/Nauticus II"
15. "Animae Partus II"

The track listing is identical for both the CD and DVD, which are in turn identical to the studio release of "BE".

== Personnel ==
- Daniel Gildenlöw – lead vocals, electric and acoustic guitars, mandola, percussion
- Johan Hallgren – electric and acoustic guitars, vocals, percussion
- Fredrik Hermansson – grand piano, harpsichord, percussion
- Kristoffer Gildenlöw – fretted and fretless basses, double bass, vocals, percussion
- Johan Langell – drums, percussion

The Orchestra of Eternity

- Mihai Cucu – first violin
- Camilla Arvidsson – second violin
- Kristina Ekman – viola
- Magnus Lanning – cello
- Åsa Karlberg – flute
- Anette Kumlin – oboe
- Nils-Åke Pettersson – clarinet
- Dries van den Poel – bass clarinet
- Sven-Oloe Juvas – tuba

Backtrack musicians

- Daniel Gildenlöw – harmony vocals, choirs, guitars, keyboards, samplers, Chinese archo
- Mats Stenlund – church organ
- Cecilia Ringkvist – vocals
- Donald Morgan – narration
- Donald K. Morgan – narration
- Alex R. Morgan – narration
- Kim Howatt – news reading, Cindy (Sandra!)
- Jim Howatt – news reading
- Blair Wilson – Miss Mediocrity
- Gaby Howatt – Miss Mediocrity
- Various people from around the world – voice messages to God

Concept, research, original stories, lyrics, narrations and texts by Daniel Gildenlöw.

All orchestral arrangements by Daniel Gildenlöw, except "Iter Impius" by Fredrik Hermansson and "Imago" by Jan Levander and Daniel Gildenlöw.
