= 12:5 =

Live album by Pain of Salvation
- Released: 23 February 2004
- Recorded: 12 May 2003
- Venue: Blå Salen (Eskilstuna)
- Genre: Progressive metal
- Length: 60:40
- Label: InsideOut Music
- Producer: Pain of Salvation

Pain of Salvation chronology
Remedy Lane (2002)	12:5 (2004)	BE (2004)

Professional ratings
Review scores
Source	Rating
Weekender	A

12:5 is the first live album by Swedish band Pain of Salvation. It was released in 2004 and was recorded from a concert in the band's home town of Eskilstuna, Sweden, on 12 May (12.5) 2003. It was an "unplugged" show, meaning that there were only acoustic instruments, i.e. no electric guitars; grand piano and harpsichord instead of synthesizers. It features songs from all the band's albums to that date except One Hour by the Concrete Lake.

== Outline ==
The songs of 12:5 are not simply the original studio versions played with acoustic instruments. Most have been rearranged and have new parts layered over the top of old ones. The reasoning behind this is that the band did not want to simply release "Pain of Salvation Live", but rather a performance of the band taking a more personal and different approach to the material. Reactions to the album were mainly positive, and the band was applauded for its ability to re-interpret their own material. Of particular note is the 12:5 version of "Ashes" which begins with its original intro (in A minor), but then continues in an uplifting major key.

"Reconciliation" contains a short excerpt from the Imperial March theme from the Star Wars trilogy.

== Track listing ==
Book I: Genesis
No.	Title	Length
1.	"Brickwork Part I (Leaving Entropia T5 A)" (originally from Entropia)	5:44
2.	"Brickwork Part II (This Heart of Mine T5)" (originally from Remedy Lane)	2:35
3.	"Brickwork Part III (Song for the Innocent T5)" (originally from The Perfect Element Part I)	1:23
4.	"Brickwork Part IV (Descend 1)" (section of "Her Voices," originally from The Perfect Element Part I)	0:37
5.	"Brickwork Part V (Leaving Entropia T5 B)" (originally from Entropia)	0:48

Book II: Genesister
No.	Title	Length
6.	"Winning a War T5" (originally from Entropia)	7:52
7.	"Reconciliation T5" (originally from The Perfect Element Part I)	4:22
8.	"Dryad of the Woods T5" (originally from Remedy Lane)	5:37
9.	"Oblivion Ocean T5" (originally from Entropia)	5:18
10.	"Undertow T5" (originally from Remedy Lane)	5:46
11.	"Chain Sling T5" (originally from Remedy Lane)	4:25

Book III: Genesinister
No.	Title	Length
12.	"Brickwork Part VI (Ascend 1)" (section of "Idioglossia," originally from The Perfect Element Part I)	1:39
13.	"Brickwork Part VII (Ascend 2)" (different section of "Her Voices," originally from The Perfect Element Part I)	1:19
14.	"Brickwork Part VIII (Second Love)" (originally from Remedy Lane)	4:12
15.	"Brickwork Part IX (Ashes T5)" (major key version; originally from The Perfect Element Part I)	5:12
16.	"Brickwork Part X (Descend 2)" (blues jam)	3:51

At the actual concert the band played an encore song, "Ashes" (in the original key).

== Personnel ==
Band:

- Daniel Gildenlöw – lead vocals, acoustic guitar
- Fredrik Hermansson – grand piano, harpsichord
- Johan Hallgren – acoustic guitar, backing vocals (lead vocals on Chain Sling chorus)
- Johan Langell – drums, backing vocals
- Kristoffer Gildenlöw – acoustic bass, cello, backing vocals
