= Road Salt (song) =

Single by Pain of Salvation

from the album Road Salt One
- A-side: "Road Salt"
- Released: 2010
- Label: Century Media Records
- Songwriter(s): Daniel Gildenlöw

Pain of Salvation singles chronology
"Ashes" (2000)	"Road Salt" (2010)	"Sisters" (2010)

"Road Salt" is a song written by Daniel Gildenlöw, and performed by Pain of Salvation in the first semifinal of Melodifestivalen 2010 in Örnsköldsvik, from where it made it to Andra chansen before getting knocked out of contest. The band also recorded the song on the album Road Salt One.

During Melodifestivalen 2012, the song appeared at "Tredje chansen".

== Charts ==
Chart (2010)	Peak position
Sweden (Sverigetopplistan)	12
