= In the Passing Light of Day =

Studio album by Pain of Salvation
- Released: 13 January 2017
- Recorded: 2015–2016
- Studio: Dugout Studio; Tuft Studio; Daniel Gildenlöw's and Ragnar Zolberg's home studios Balsta Musikslott; Studio Brun
- Genre: Progressive metal, progressive rock, art rock
- Length: 71:46
- Label: InsideOut
- Producer: Daniel Bergstrand, Daniel Gildenlöw, Ragnar Zolberg

Pain of Salvation chronology
Falling Home (2014)	In the Passing Light of Day (2017)	Panther (2020)

Professional ratings
Review scores
Source	Rating
Classic Rock	4/5 stars
Cutting Edge	5/5 stars
Focus	8/10
Inferno (lehti)	5/5 stars
Interia Muzyka	8/10
Laut.de	5/5 stars
Plattentests.de	7/10
Rock Hard	7.5/10
Soundi	4/5 stars

In the Passing Light of Day is the tenth studio album by Swedish band Pain of Salvation, released on 13 January 2017 via InsideOut Music. A concept album like every other by the band, the lyrics focus on mortality, death and the joys and angers of life. The album is dedicated to "my lover, my best friend", in reference to Daniel Gildenlöw's wife Johanna Iggsten.

== Album information ==
The album was conceived in 2014 when bandleader Daniel Gildenlöw contracted a life-threatening flesh eating bacteria. Hospitalized in Uppsala, Sweden, he was forced to sit out of Transatlantic's KaLIVEoscope tour. While receiving treatment Gildenlöw wrote the songs that became the basic premise of the album, including the 15 minute title track.

"I have been brought to the emergency ward with flesh-eating bacteria. Teams of doctors struggle, but no antibiotics help and no morphine takes away the pain. What started off as an annoying infection has, in just hours, suddenly pivoted into the very real possibility of my actually dying."

— Daniel Gildenlöw

The song is about Daniel's wife Johanna and the life they've spent together. It makes reference to "A Trace of Blood" from Remedy Lane, written about Johanna's miscarriage. In fact, Gildenlöw has referred to this album as Remedy Lane II due to its repeated use of themes found throughout the original's songs.

== Track listing ==
All lyrics are written by Daniel Gildenlöw except on the song "Meaningless", written by Ragnar Zolberg; all music is composed by Daniel Gildenlöw & Ragnar Zolberg, except for "Silent Gold" by Daniel Gildenlöw & Peter Kvint.

No.	Title	Length
1.	"On a Tuesday"	10:22
2.	"Tongue of God"	4:53
3.	"Meaningless"	4:47
4.	"Silent Gold"	3:23
5.	"Full Throttle Tribe"	9:05
6.	"Reasons"	4:45
7.	"Angels of Broken Things"	6:24
8.	"The Taming of a Beast"	6:33
9.	"If This Is the End"	6:03
10.	"The Passing Light of Day"	15:31
Total length:		71:46

=== Special edition bonus CD ===
No.	Title	Length
1.	"Introduction (demo intro)"	1:45
2.	"Tongue of God (demo intro)"	0:48
3.	"Tongue of God (demo)"	5:00
4.	"Meaningless (demo intro)"	0:44
5.	"Meaningless (demo)"	5:48
6.	"Silent Gold (demo intro)"	0:48
7.	"Silent Gold (demo)"	3:12
8.	"Full Throttle Tribe (demo intro)"	0:49
9.	"Full Throttle Tribe (demo)"	8:54
10.	"Reasons (demo intro)"	0:52
11.	"Reasons (demo)"	4:32
12.	"Angels of Broken Things (demo intro)"	0:42
13.	"Angels of Broken Things (demo)"	6:56
14.	"Bloopers"	2:32
Total length:		43:22

== Personnel ==
- Daniel Gildenlöw – vocals, guitar
- Ragnar Zolberg – guitar, vocals
- Gustaf Hielm – bass, vocals
- Daniel "D2" Karlsson – keyboards, vocals
- Léo Margarit – drums, vocals

=== Guest musicians ===
- Peter Kvint – bass, mellotron and backing vocals on "Silent Gold"
- Camilla Arvidsson – violin
- David Ra-Champari – violin
- Anette Kumlin – oboe, English horn
- Hálfdán Árnason – double bass

== Charts ==
Chart (2017)	Peak position
Austrian Albums (Ö3 Austria)	39
Belgian Albums (Ultratop Flanders)	82
Belgian Albums (Ultratop Wallonia)	79
Dutch Albums (Album Top 100)	86
Finnish Albums (Suomen virallinen lista)	32
French Albums (SNEP)	107
German Albums (Offizielle Top 100)	28
Italian Albums (FIMI)	56
Swiss Albums (Schweizer Hitparade)	28
