= Labyrinth of Dreams =

Labyrinth of Dreams can refer to:

- Labyrinth of Dreams (album), a 1992 album by Elegy
- Labyrinth of Dreams (film), a 1997 Japanese film
