= Forbidden Fruit (Elegy album) =

Elegy album

Studio album by Elegy
- Released: 31 October 2000
- Genre: Power metal
- Length: 52:13
- Label: T&T / Noise
- Producer: Elegy

Elegy chronology
Manifestation of Fear (1998)	Forbidden Fruit (2000)	Principles of Pain (2002)

Professional ratings
Review scores
Source	Rating
AllMusic	3/5 stars

Forbidden Fruit, released in 2000, is an album by Dutch power metal band Elegy.

== Track listing ==
1. "Icehouse" - 5:11
2. "Force Majeure" - 4:44
3. "Killing Time" - 2:52
4. "Behind the Tears" - 5:23
5. "The Great Charade" - 4:44
6. "'Til Eternity" - 7:44
7. "Masquerade" - 5:01
8. "Elegant Solution" - 4:28
9. "I Believe" - 4:50
10. "Forbidden Fruit" - 7:16

=== 2006 edition bonus tracks ===
1. "Sweet Revenge"
2. "Angel Without Wings"
3. "The Forgotten"

=== Japanese Edition Bonus Tracks ===
1. "Eloquence"
2. "Always with You"
3. "Angel without Wings"
4. "Spirits"
5. "The Forgotten"

== Personnel ==
=== Band members ===
- Ian Parry - vocals, mixing
- Patrick Rondat - guitars
- Martin Helmantel - bass, backing vocals
- Günter Werno - keyboards
- Dirk Bruinenberg - drums, backing vocals

=== Production ===
- Hans Pieters - engineer, mixing
- Dennis Leidelmeijer - assistant engineer
- Jan Rooymans - mastering
