= Voodoo Johnson =

British rock band

Voodoo Johnson are an English heavy rock band based in Birmingham. Formed in 2007, they have released one album and three EPs.

== History ==
=== Formation and EPs (2007–2009) ===
Voodoo Johnson were formed in 2007 by Carl Gethin and Dave Barker after they met working in an ice cream factory while at University. Initially called Polarian, the pair recruited Carl's brother Paul, bassist Ben Picken and singer Dai Roberts to complete the line-up. After extensive touring and support slots with Zico Chain and Sign, Ben Picken and Dai Roberts left and were replaced by Rich Bellamy and Kev Bayliss in December 2007. Many of the original songs, with vocals now added by Bayliss, appeared on the band's debut demo EP (confusingly titled II). The demo EP was recorded in early 2008 at M2 Studios near Wolverhampton, released later that year, and followed by support slots with Hawkwind and Tokyo Dragons. EP II was followed in 2009 by Into the Red. The 5-track EP was recorded at Wolverhampton's Magic Garden studios and produced and mixed by Gavin Monaghan. Positive reviews in Classic Rock Magazine and further exposure through support slots with Duff McKagan's Loaded and The Answer saw the band subsequently named as Ones to Watch in Classic Rock Magazine's January 2010 edition.

=== 10,000 Horses ===
The band's debut album was released in August 2010 on Spiritual Beast/Universal in Asia and Polarian Records in Europe to a largely positive response (Blogs 'n Roses called the album "the best debut record from a hard rock band since Appetite for Destruction"). Metal Hammer described it as being "chock full of headline grabbing potential", and Kerrang! described it as "mesmerising". The majority of the album was recorded at Longwave Studios in Cardiff and produced and mixed by Romesh Dodangoda (except two tracks produced by John Mitchell at Outhouse Studios in Reading). The Japanese music critic Masa Ito wrote the liner notes for the Asian release. Following the success of the album, the band were confirmed as main support for Europe on their Balls 'n' Banners tour.

=== Bayliss out, Taylor-Stoakes in ===
Only three months after the release of 10,000 Horses in November 2010, singer Kev Bayliss announced that he was leaving the band, citing 'personal differences'. The same day, the remaining members of the band confirmed that they would be continuing without Bayliss and began the search for a new singer in preparation for their dates with Europe. That singer was eventually confirmed as Nik Taylor-Stoakes in January 2011. Former vocalist with south coast metal band Vallenbrosa, Taylor-Stoakes' gruff vocal style was a considerable departure from Bayliss' high pitched vocals, but the band were confident that they could work well with their new member; as Carl Gethin said in an interview in February 2011, "He's got a very different voice to Kev. It's a lot lower and grittier but we kinda thought that we don't just want a replacement for Kev, we don't want someone who can sing like Kev, what we're really looking for is someone that we can work with and that we're all positive about the music we're making". Taylor-Stoakes subsequently joined the band for their tour with Europe, which was followed by a belated headline tour for the 10,000 Horses album in April 2011, as well as dates in Norway and a slot at the 2011 Download Festival.

=== "Black Skies Mist" ===
Voodoo Johnson's first release with their new singer was the digital single "Black Skies Mist", recorded once again at Outhouse Studios. The track is notable as a collaboration with Diamond Head's Brian Tatler, who contacted the band after they named him as an influence in an interview with Classic Rock magazine. Tatler contributed the intro and outro riffs to the final song and recorded a solo at M2 Studios in time for a March 2011 release.

=== Black Powder Mother Loader ===
Voodoo Johnson's next release was another EP, named in August 2011 as Black Powder Mother Loader. The EP, again recorded at Outhouse Studios, features the previous single Black Skies Mist, as well as four new songs, and was released online and with a limited run of 1000 physical copies on 17 October 2011.

== Musical style and influence ==
Voodoo Johnson have a hard rock sound that has progressively moved away from the classic rock genre that characterised their first demo EP II, and incorporated more stoner, metal and post-rock elements into their sound. Queens of the Stone Age, Pearl Jam, Radiohead, Soundgarden and Metallica are said to have been their primary influences.
