= Crystal Tears =

Crystal Tears may refer to:

- Crystal Tears, 1982 album by Sheila Andrews
- Crystal Tears, 1999 album by On Thorns I Lay
- Crystal Tears (band)
