= Linoleum (disambiguation) =

Linoleum is a material used for floor covering and also by artists for linocut prints.

Linoleum may also refer to:

- Linoleum (band), a London-based musical group
- Linoleum (EP), an EP by progressive metal band Pain Of Salvation
- Linoleum (film), a 2022 film starring Jim Gaffigan
- "Linoléum", a song by Dumas
- "Linoleum" (song), a 1994 song by the punk rock band NOFX

== See also ==
- Linoleum knife, a small knife
