= Panther (album) =

Studio album by Pain of Salvation
- Released: 28 August 2020
- Genre: Avant-garde metal, progressive metal
- Length: 53:29
- Label: InsideOut
- Producer: Daniel Bergstrand, Daniel Gildenlöw

Pain of Salvation chronology
In the Passing Light of Day (2017)	Panther (2020)

Panther is the eleventh studio album by Swedish band Pain of Salvation, released on 28 August 2020 via InsideOut Music.

== Track listing ==
Lyrics and music by Daniel Gildenlöw.

=== Standard Edition ===
No.	Title	Length
1.	"Accelerator"	5:31
2.	"Unfuture"	6:46
3.	"Restless Boy"	3:34
4.	"Wait"	7:04
5.	"Keen to a Fault"	6:01
6.	"Fur"	1:34
7.	"Panther"	4:11
8.	"Species"	5:18
9.	"Icon"	13:30
Total length:		53:29

=== Special Edition Bonus CD ===
No.	Title	Length
1.	"Panther" (Demo)	4:09
2.	"Keen to a Fault" (Demo)	5:31
3.	"Fifi Gruffi"	2:32
4.	"Unforever"	2:27
Total length:		14:39

== Personnel ==
- Daniel Gildenlöw – all vocals, electric/acoustic guitars, bass, piano, keyboard, cello, banjo, percussion, programming; drums on "Unfuture"
- Léo Margarit – drums on all other songs
- Johan Hallgren – final guitar solo on "Icon"

=== Guest musicians ===
- Sandiran Gildenlöw – additional vocals on "Accelerator"
- The Dalek – additional noise on "Accelerator"

== Critical reception ==
Professional ratings
Review scores
Source	Rating
Blabbermouth	8.5/10
InRock	9/10
Metal Injection	9/10
Metal Storm	8.2/10
Rock Hard	8/10
Sputnikmusic	4.5/5

The album is the follow-up to the concept album In the Passing Light of Day. During its development, Daniel Gildenlöw used a different approach to composing in order to expand the sounds of the band without losing its typical style. PopMatters described the album as "a true triumph", with "added variety, experimentation, and thought-provoking quandaries".

== Charts ==
Chart (2020)	Peak position
Austria	35
Belgium (Wallonia)	42
France	125
Germany	19
Switzerland	18
United Kingdom	12
