= Ending Themes (On the Two Deaths of Pain of Salvation) =

Live album by Pain of Salvation
- Released: March 2009 DVD, Limited Edition DVD and CD
- Recorded: March 2, 2007
- Venue: Paradiso (Amsterdam, Netherlands)
- Genre: Progressive metal
- Label: InsideOut
- Producer: Daniel Gildenlöw, Per Hillblom

Pain of Salvation chronology
Scarsick (2007)	Ending Themes (On the Two Deaths of Pain of Salvation) (2009)	Linoleum (EP) (2009)

Ending Themes (On the Two Deaths of Pain of Salvation) is a live album and documentary by Swedish progressive metal band Pain of Salvation. It was released on January 26, 2009, with a DVD version released on March 3, 2009. The DVD release has a double disc feature. The first disc has an 80-minute documentary of the band's 2005 world tour directed by Per Hillblom and the second disc has the full concert video from the Paradiso show recorded on March 2, 2007.

A limited-edition version will also be released that will include a double audio CD version of the Amsterdam concert. The CD version was released independently of the DVDs as well.

== Track listing ==
All music by Daniel Gildenlöw, except "Hallelujah" by Leonard Cohen.

DVD1 - The First Death Of

SixWorlds/EightDays (80-minute documentary of 2005 world tour by Per Hillblom)

DVD2 - The Second Death Of

Touching You Harder: Live from Amsterdam

1. "Scarsick"
2. "America"
3. "Nightmist"
4. "! (Foreword)"
5. "Handful of Nothing"
6. "New Year's Eve"
7. "Ashes"
8. "Undertow"
9. "Brickworks 1 (Parts II-IV)"
10. "Chain Sling"
11. "Diffidentia"
12. "Flame to the Moth"
13. "Disco Queen"
14. "Hallelujah"
15. "Cribcaged"
16. "Used"

CD1

1. "Scarsick" - 7:09
2. "America" - 5:55
3. "Nightmist" - 7:48
4. "! (Foreword)" 6:47
5. "Handful of Nothing" 7:43
6. "New Year's Eve" - 5:48
7. "Ashes" - 5:25
8. "Undertow" - 5:11

CD2

1. "Brickworks 1 (Parts II-IV)" - 6:25
2. "Chain Sling" - 3:59
3. "Diffidentia" - 7:36
4. "Flame to the Moth" - 6:04
5. "Disco Queen" - 8:15
6. "Hallelujah" - 9:04
7. "Cribcaged" - 6:24
8. "Used" - 5:43

== Personnel ==
Pain of Salvation live from Amsterdam 2007

- Daniel Gildenlöw – lead vocals, guitars
- Johan Hallgren – guitars, harmony vocals
- Fredrik Hermansson – keyboards, backing vocals
- Simon Andersson – bass guitar, backing vocals
- Johan Langell – drums, backing vocals

Additional members present in 2005 documentary

- Kristoffer Gildenlöw – bass guitar, vocals
