= Ragnar Zolberg =

Icelandic musician

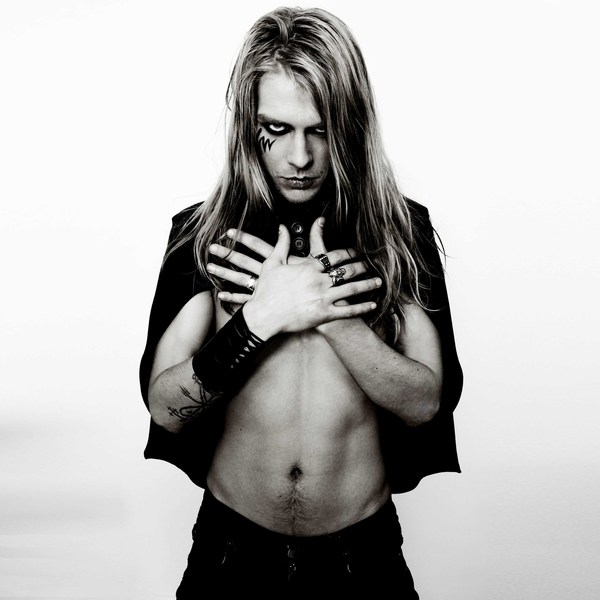
Ragnar Zolberg

Ragnar Zolberg (born 2 December 1986) is an Icelandic multi-instrumentalist, singer and songwriter. He is a founding member and frontman of the Icelandic rock band Sign and was a guitarist and vocalist in the Swedish progressive metal band Pain of Salvation.

== Career ==
Zolberg co-founded Sign around 2000. The band emerged from Iceland's rock scene in the early 2000s, with Zolberg serving as its singer and guitarist. Sign later performed internationally and appeared at festivals including Iceland Airwaves. In 2005, Kerrang! gave the band's Iceland Airwaves performance four out of five "K"s, with coverage specifically noting Zolberg's performance as frontman.

Sign released several studio albums, including Thank God for Silence, The Hope and Hermd. The band also toured with acts including The Wildhearts, Wednesday 13 and The Answer.

Zolberg joined Pain of Salvation in the early 2010s as a guitarist and vocalist. He appeared on the band's 2014 acoustic album Falling Home, the 2016 live album Remedy Lane Re:Lived, and the 2017 studio album In the Passing Light of Day.

His role in In the Passing Light of Day extended beyond performance to songwriting. Contemporary reviews highlighted the contrast between Zolberg's vocals and those of bandleader Daniel Gildenlöw, particularly on songs such as "Meaningless". Zolberg left Pain of Salvation in 2017.

Alongside his work with bands, Zolberg has maintained a solo career. He released his first solo album, Upplifun, at the age of 11 and later released albums including The Circle, The Hanged Man, The Hermit, ROG, Sonr Ravns, Forest Lovesongs, Heavy Heart and Heavy Metal at the Summer House.

In 2019, Zolberg performed as a solo artist at Iceland Airwaves. A preview in The Reykjavík Grapevine described his solo material as combining heavy and acoustic elements and singled out the long-form song "Celestía".

== Discography ==
=== Solo releases ===
- Upplifun! (1998)
- The Circle (2008)
- The Hanged Man (2011)
- The Hermit (2014)
- Feelings (2015)
- The Circle (Darker Side) (2017)
- ROG (2018)
- Sonr Ravns (2018)
- ROG II (2020)
- 220 / Celestía (2020)
- Forest Lovesongs (2022)
- Heavy Heart (2024)
- Heavy Metal at the Summer House (2025)

=== With Pain of Salvation ===
- Falling Home (2014)
- Remedy Lane Re:Lived (2016)
- In the Passing Light of Day (2017)
