= Falling Home (Pain of Salvation album) =

Studio album of re-recorded songs by Pain of Salvation
- Released: 10 November 2014
- Genre: Progressive rock, folk rock, acoustic rock
- Length: 48:36
- Label: InsideOut
- Producer: Pain of Salvation

Pain of Salvation chronology
Road Salt Two (2011)	Falling Home (2014)	In the Passing Light of Day (2017)

Falling Home is the ninth studio album by Swedish band Pain of Salvation, released on November 10, 2014, by InsideOut. Falling Home is an acoustic album, featuring acoustic versions of previous work, covers of Dio and Lou Reed and the self-titled track.

== Track listing ==
Concept, music and lyrics by Daniel Gildenlöw, except where noted.

=== Standard Edition ===
No.	Title	Writer(s)	Length
1.	"Stress"	Gildenlöw, Daniel Magdic	5:32
2.	"Linoleum"		4:57
3.	"To the Shoreline"		3:05
4.	"Holy Diver"	Ronnie James Dio	4:34
5.	"1979"		2:50
6.	"Chain Sling"		4:07
7.	"Perfect Day"	Lou Reed	4:51
8.	"Mrs. Modern Mother Mary"		4:23
9.	"Flame to the Moth"		4:30
10.	"Spitfall"		6:42
11.	"Falling Home"	Gildenlöw, Ragnar Zolberg	3:05

=== Limited Edition Digipack ===
1. Stress (Gildenlöw/Magdic) - 05:32
2. Linoleum - 04:57
3. To the Shoreline - 03:05
4. Holy Diver (Dio) - 04:34
5. 1979 - 02:50
6. She Likes to Hide - 02:57
7. Chain Sling - 04:07
8. Perfect Day (Lou Reed) - 04:51
9. Spitfall - 06:42
10. Mrs. Modern Mother Mary - 04:23
11. Flame to the Moth - 04:30
12. King Of Loss - 07:12
13. Falling Home (Gildenlöw/Zolberg) - 03:05

== Personnel ==
- Daniel Gildenlöw - lead vocals, acoustic guitars
- Ragnar Zolberg - acoustic guitars, vocals
- Gustaf Hielm - acoustic basses, upright bass, vocals
- Daniel "D2" Karlsson - rhodes, organs, vocals
- Léo Margarit - drums, vocals
