= No One's Words =

Studio album by Ephrat
- Released: November 4, 2008
- Recorded: 2006–2008
- Genre: Progressive rock; progressive metal
- Length: 59:43
- Label: InsideOut Music
- Producer: Omer Ephrat/Steven Wilson

Professional ratings
Review scores
Source	Rating
AllMusic	3.5/5 stars
Metal Storm	7.8/10

No One's Words is the name of the debut album by Israeli progressive rock act Ephrat. The album was produced by Omer Ephrat and mixed/mastered by Steven Wilson.

== Track listing ==
1. "The Show" – 10:31
2. "Haze" – 7:13
3. "Better Than Anything" – 8:26
4. "Blocked" – 4:55
5. "The Sum of Damage Done" – 9:36
6. "Real" – 18:58

== Personnel ==
- Lior Seker – vocals
- Omer Ephrat – keyboards, guitars, flute
- Gili Rosenberg – bass
- Tomer Z – drums
- Asaf Dar – cello
- David Segal – double bass
- Barak Ben-Tsur – percussion
- Petronella Nettermalm – vocals
- Daniel Gildenlöw – vocals
- Steven Wilson – mixing, mastering
