= The Perfect Element, Part I =

Studio album by Pain of Salvation
- Released: 31 October 2000
- Recorded: March–July 2000
- Studio: Roasting House Recording Studio (Malmö, Sweden)
- Genre: Progressive metal
- Length: 72:44
- Label: InsideOut Music
- Producer: Daniel Gildenlöw, Anders "Theo" Theander, Pain of Salvation

Pain of Salvation chronology
One Hour by the Concrete Lake (1998)	The Perfect Element, Part I (2000)	Remedy Lane (2002)

Singles from The Perfect Element, Part I
- 1. "Ashes" Released: 2000

Professional ratings
Review scores
Source	Rating
AllMusic	3/5 stars

The Perfect Element, Part I is Pain of Salvation's third studio album, released in October 2000. It is a concept album that focuses on the forming of the individual, particularly on the events from one's childhood and adolescence. It is the first segment of a planned three-part concept. The Perfect Element, Part II was released in 2007 under the title Scarsick.

== Analysis ==
The Perfect Element, Part I is the first part of a planned, two-piece concept, and is divided into three chapters, each containing four tracks.

Part one of the concept is a story of human development, which focuses specifically on the progression from childhood to adolescence. It contains many themes within its context which include:

- Child abuse (sexual and physical)
- Sexuality
- Tragedy
- Drug abuse
- Love
- Pain
- Anger
- Loss (of life and innocence, among other things)
- Shame
- Regret
- Despair
- Inner struggles

All these themes are dealt with as the story explores the lives of two characters, one male and one female (known commonly as "He" and "She") who are broken, dysfunctional people. They meet in the events of the song "Ashes" after the first two songs of the album present us with a depiction of their troubled pasts ("Used" for "He" and in "In the Flesh" for "She"). After that introduction, the concept focuses on the inner struggles and feelings of the characters after the events on "Ashes", and we also have some memory flashes, telling us more about their pasts and revealing what events in their lives caused them to become what they are, finally ending with the "falling" of He on the last song, "The Perfect Element".

== Track listing ==
All lyrics by Daniel Gildenlöw. All music and arrangements by Daniel Gildenlöw except the middle part of "Her Voices" by Daniel Gildenlöw and Fredrik Hermansson, and the "Once..." part of "The Perfect Element" by Daniel Gildenlöw and Johan Langell. String arrangements by Daniel Gildenlöw and Fredrik Hermansson.

Chapter I: As These Two Desolate Worlds Collide
No.	Title	Length
1.	"Used"	5:23
2.	"In the Flesh"	8:36
3.	"Ashes"	4:28
4.	"Morning on Earth"	4:34

Chapter II: It All Catches Up on You When You Slow Down
No.	Title	Length
5.	"Idioglossia"	8:29
6.	"Her Voices"	7:56
7.	"Dedication"	4:00
8.	"King of Loss"	9:46

Chapter III: Far Beyond the Point of No Return
No.	Title	Length
9.	"Reconciliation"	4:24
10.	"Song for the Innocent"	3:02
11.	"Falling"	1:50
12.	"The Perfect Element"	10:09
13.	"Epilogue" (Japanese bonus track)	3:14

Concept, lyrics and artwork by Daniel Gildenlöw.

A Limited Edition has been also released with an extra cd including bonus tracks and multimedia application containing videos ("Ashes", "Exclamation") and additional material/information.

Extra CD:

1. "Beyond the Mirror" - 8:20
2. "Never Learn to Fly" - 5:10
3. "Time Weaver’s Tale" - 6:19
4. (PC multimedia track with videos, photos, interview, additional information/material and hidden area)

== Personnel ==
- Daniel Gildenlöw – lead vocals, guitar, producer, mixing, mastering
- Kristoffer Gildenlöw – bass, backing vocals
- Johan Hallgren – guitar, backing vocals, mixing
- Fredrik Hermansson – keyboards, Steinway and samples
- Johan Langell – drums, backing vocals, mixing, mastering

Additional personnel

- Anders "Theo" Theander – producer, engineering
- Pontus Lindmark – engineering
- Mihai Cucu – strings
- Camilla Andersson – strings
- Petter Axelsson – strings
- Gretel Gradén – strings
- Johnny Björk – strings
- Daniel Gildenlöw/Gildenlöw MultiMedia – artwork
- Elin Iggsten – photos
- Johanna Iggsten – photos
- Fredrik Hallgren – photos
