= Elegy (band) =

Dutch power metal band (founded 1986)

- Origin: Eindhoven, The Netherlands
- Genres: Power metal, progressive metal
- Years active: 1986-present
- Labels: Shark Records, T&T, Locomotive Music
- Members: Ian Parry; Henk van der Laars; Gilbert Pot; Martin Helmantel; Dirk Bruinenberg
- Past members: Arno van Brussel; Chris Terheijden; Bert Burgers; Ed Warby; Eduard Hovinga; Serge Meeuwsen; Ton van de Stroom; Gerrit Hager; Chris Allister; Patrick Rondat; Joshua Dutrieux; Bart Bisseling
- Website: Elegy Official Site

Elegy are a Dutch power metal band, founded in 1986 in Eindhoven. Their music is characterized by the fusion of power and progressive metal, which made them the pioneers of the 'progressive power metal' subgenre. The band was plagued by a continuing changing roster, which counts in the current line-up only one founding member. Elegy have currently suspended any recording or live activity, apart from occasional reunion shows.

== History ==
The band was formed in 1986 by guitarists Henk van der Laars and Arno van Brussel, who recruited the first stable line-up of Elegy with vocalist Chris Terheijden, bassist Martin Helmantel and Bert Burgers on drums. In 1986, the new band won a competition organized by the German magazine Metal Hammer and Polydor Records and recorded their first demo Metricide. After recording their second demo, Better Than Bells, the band had already become known enough to tour with Angel Witch, Paul Di'Anno’s Battlezone, Hellion and King Diamond. The following year came the first changes in the band: Ed Warby and Eduard Hovinga joined the band on drums and vocals. This line-up recorded a third demo called Elegant Solution.

In 1992 they recorded their first album (Labyrinth of Dreams) and ensured a contract with the German label Shark Records. The album was a success in Japan where it reached number 42 in the album charts. Soon after the release of the album in 1993, Ed Warby left the band to join Gorefest and drummer Serge Meeuwsen was hired for a Japanese tour, along keyboard player Ton van de Stroom. Back from Japan, Meeuwsen, van de Stroom and founding member Arno van Brussel left Elegy, to be replaced by drummer Dirk Bruinenberg and guitarist Gilbert Pot.

In the spring of 1994, Elegy released their second studio album, Supremacy, which received little promotion by their record label and was supported only by a small tour with Annihilator, Phantom Blue, The Gathering and Gorefest.

In the summer of 1995, the album Lost is presented to the public, with new keyboard player Gerrit Hager. But shortly before going on tour with Yngwie Malmsteen, Hovinga, Pot and Hager left the band. At the same the German record company Modern Music, home of T&T and Noise Records, offered the band a lucrative contract.

The following year, vocalist Ian Parry (ex-Hammerhead) joined the band and recorded the EP Primal Instinct, which contains acoustic versions of old Elegy songs.

The album State of Mind saw the light in May 1997 with good reviews and sales, both in Europe and Japan. Elegy went on a European tour with the Finnish band Stratovarius to support the new album.

Chris Allister joined on keyboards for the concept album Manifestation of Fear, released in the summer of 1998. The band co-headlined a European tour with American power metal band Kamelot the same year.

After the tour in 1999, Parry started his side-project Consortium with Bruinenberg on drums. At the end of the year founding member Henk van de Laars and Chris Allister left Elegy. French guitar virtuoso Patrick Rondat joined the band during the same year and recorded Elegy's eight album Forbidden Fruit, released on September 18, 2000, and well received by critics. Forbidden Fruit was the last album released for Modern Music, leaving the band without a recording contract for more than a year. Meanwhile, the band members worked on side-projects or as touring and session musicians

Two years later Elegy released Principles of Pain with the Spanish label Locomotive Records. Since then the band have not published any more albums and is currently on hiatus.

Ian Parry said in a 2012 interview that he would like to make one more Elegy album, if a record company would be prepared to invest in it. Guitar player Henk van der Laars wrote an album full of songs but more effort is needed to get it ready.

On Friday April 1, 2023 news broke of the band's reunion, following relentless speculations. Reuniting in their strongest line-up, the band sees the return of their founding member, guitarist Henk v/d Laars after decades of absence. Rumor has it the band reunited by popular demand and request of musicians globally. Helmantel joined ranks of Headless featuring Dario Parente and Walter Cianciusi and both guitarists are fans of Elegy's work. They sparked the flame, as did guitarist Bill Hudson (I am Morbid, Doro, Northtale), mentioning recently Elegy as a huge inspiration. Upon news dropping, Helmantel and Parry are touring with Headless supporting Geoff Tate on his 35th anniversary tour for 'Operation: Mindcrime', performing an inspired version of Elegy's praised classic "Visual Vortex".

== Discography ==
=== Albums ===
- Demo 86 - (1986) Demo
- Better Than Bells - (1987) Demo
- Elegant Solution - (1988) Demo
- Labyrinth Of Dreams - (1990) Demo
- Labyrinth of Dreams (1992)
- Supremacy (1994)
- Lost (1995)
- Primal Instinct (EP) (1996)
- State of Mind (1997)
- Manifestation of Fear (1998)
- Forbidden Fruit (2000)
- Principles of Pain (2002)

== Band members ==
=== Current members ===
- Ian Parry - vocals (1995–present)
- Henk van der Laars - guitars (1986–1999, 2023–present)
- Gilbert Pot - guitars, keyboards (1993–1995, 2023–present)
- Martin Helmantel - bass (1987–present)
- Dirk Bruinenberg - drums (1993–2002, 2023–present)

=== Former members ===
- Arno Van Brussel - guitars (1986–1993)
- Chris Terheijden - vocals (1986–1989)
- Bert Burgers - drums (1986–1988)
- Ed Warby - drums (1988–1993)
- Eduard Hovinga - vocals (1990–1995)
- Serge Meeuwsen - drums (1993)
- Ton van de Stroom - keyboards (1992–1993)
- Gerrit Hager - keyboards (1995)
- Chris Allister - keyboards (1998–1999)
- Patrick Rondat - guitars (1999–2002)
- Bart Bisseling - drums (2002)
