= Amphibia (album) =

Studio album by Patrick Rondat
- Released: 1996
- Genre: Instrumental Metal, Progressive metal
- Length: 56:45
- Label: Disques Dreyfus
- Producer: Patrick Rondat

Patrick Rondat chronology
Rape of the Earth (1991)	Amphibia (1996)	On the Edge (1999)

Amphibia is a third album from French Instrumental Metal guitarist Patrick Rondat.

== Track listing ==
No.	Title	Writer(s)	Length
1.	"Amphibia Part 1"	Patrick Rondat	3:39
2.	"Amphibia Part 2"	Rondat	6:36
3.	"Amphibia Part 3"	Rondat	3:12
4.	"Amphibia Part 4"	Rondat	6:34
5.	"Amphibia Part 5"	Rondat	2:18
6.	"Amphibia Part 6"	Rondat	5:54
7.	"Camouflage"	Rondat	5:38
8.	"Vivaldi Tribute"	Antonio Vivaldi	2:59
9.	"Dreamstreet"	Rondat	4:38
10.	"Backhand"	Rondat	5:26
11.	"Shattered Chains"	Rondat	5:37
12.	"Equinoxe IV"	Jean Michel Jarre	4:14
Total length:			56:45

== Personnel ==
- Patrice Guers - Bass
- Tommy Aldridge - Drums
- Patrick Rondat - Guitar
- Phil Woindrich - Keyboards
