= Patrick Rondat =

French guitarist (born 1960)

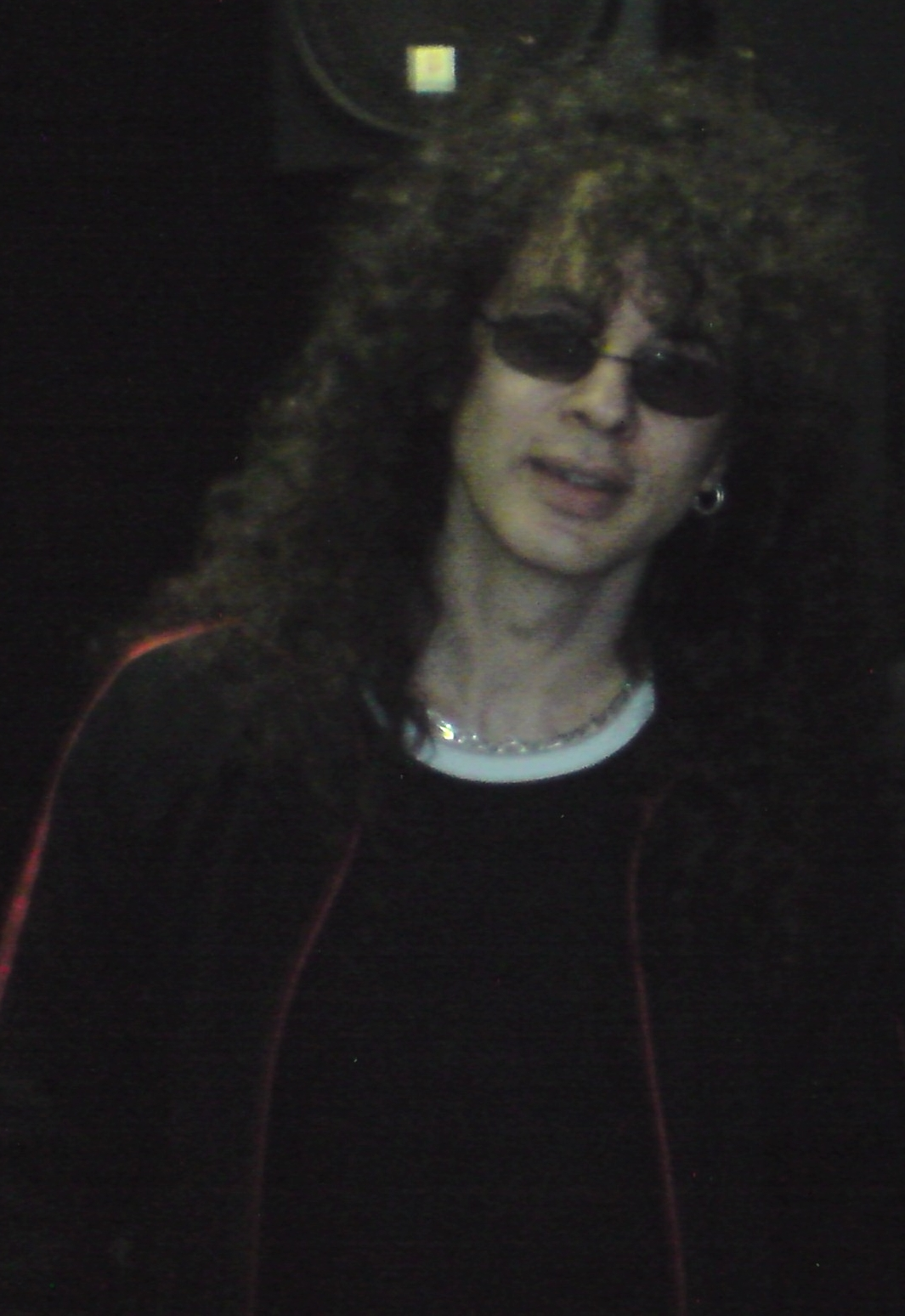
- Patrick Rondat in 2009
- Born: 12 October 1960 (age 66); Paris, France
- Occupation: Musician
- Years active: 1985–present
- Musical career
- Genres: Progressive metal; classical rock; jazz rock; new-age music
- Instrument: Guitar
- Labels: Disques Vogue; XIII Bis Records; Music For Nations; Disques Dreyfus; Sony BMG

Patrick Rondat (born 12 October 1960) is a French guitarist. He plays instrumental heavy metal associated with diverse influences such as new-age music, progressive metal, classical music and jazz. He has collaborated on various projects with Jean Michel Jarre and has taken part in some of his shows.

== Biography ==
Patrick Rondat started playing guitar in 1978, at the age of 17, after being inspired by listening to a recording of Ronnie Montrose in a record shop. Rondat's formative influences included Al Di Meola and Yngwie Malmsteen.

He has played with Elegy, Consortium Project, Red Circuit, G3 with Joe Satriani and Steve Vai, and Jean-Michel Jarre. He is also featured on the song "Rainmaker" on Vanden Plas' Spirit of Live album. He participated in the compilation Hard-Rock Rendez-Vous (Vogue, 1989), which made him known to a wider audience, and began a French tour with Blue Öyster Cult. The release of the debut solo album Just For Fun confirmed his position as a leader of French instrumental metal.

He began touring with Rape of the Earth (Vogue / Music For Nations 1991). His first two albums were distributed internationally, and he was involved in a live show for BBC Radio 1 in London. Although still relying on technical prowess, each album presented an evolution with more mature and accomplished compositions.

Alongside his solo career, Rondat has worked with other artists. The meeting with Jean-Michel Jarre in 1991 opened new horizons in Rondat's music. After his participation in Monsters of Rock France at the Hippodrome de Vincennes in September 1991 (AC/DC, Metallica, Queensrÿche etc.), he began working with Jarre, recording the album Chronologie which led to participation in an impressive series of concerts around the world, including one at Wembley Stadium in 1993. This meeting also led to the recording of Amphibia (FDM 1996), produced by Jarre, on which Rondat is accompanied by Tommy Aldridge and Patrice Guers. This album continues the musical change in Rape of the Earth where the compositions of progressive influences are affirmed in an adaptation of Vivaldi's landmark "Presto" ("Vivaldi Tribute").

Other artists have crossed his path on several occasions, including Tony Mac Alpine, Simon Phillips, Steve Lukather, Stu Hamm (Cannes music passion) and Gary Moore (BBM) for whom Rondat was an opening act at the Zénith Paris, then he was invited to join Joe Satriani's G3 tour (1998) with Michael Schenker, for 14 shows.

In 1999, Rondat released On the Edge (FDM), a transition album exploring other musical worlds. Along with Rondat, Tommy Aldridge, and Patrice Guers, two other prestigious musicians were invited: Didier Lockwood and Michel Petrucciani.

During this period, Rondat began a collaboration with English singer Ian Parry, participating in the Consortium Project. He recorded two albums and toured Europe together with Patrice Guers (who would join Rhapsody a few years later), Dirk Bruinenberg (drummer of Elegy), Stephan Lill, and Gunter Verno (Vanden Plas). After this positive experience, Rondat joined the Dutch group Elegy for two albums, followed by a tour around the world.

Jean-Michel Jarre then planned new gigs in which Rondat was involved: Athens (Acropolis, 2001), Beijing (Forbidden City, 2004, Universal DVD), Monaco (Salle des étoiles, 2005) and Gdansk (Space of Freedom concert, 2005). During this time, Rondat prepared his new solo album An Ephemeral World (2004 NTS), a concept album evoking the ephemeral nature of things. Regarded by many as his most successful album, it confirmed its qualities as a composer and outstanding instrumentalist. There was then a tour with the band Freak Kitchen, and Manu Martin joined in on keyboards to reinforce the band.

Upon the encounter with classical pianist Hervé N'Kaoua in 2008, a collaborative work started which required, coming from the "rock" world, discipline and humility from Rondat. The duo, coming from apparently conflicting cultures, offered a new perspective on sonatas for piano and violin (Fauré / Beethoven), and also pieces for orchestra ("Winter", from Vivaldi's The Four Seasons). The recording of this album was followed by concerts in France and Italy in 2009, and XIII Bis Records released a 5-CD box set retracing his career (Just For Fun, Rape Of The Earth, An Ephemeral World, Patrick Rondat - Hervé N'Kaoua, and a disc of live tracks).

For over twenty years, Rondat has also been dedicated to teaching and considers it essential to transmit and share his musical legacy. Thus he was involved in workshops and master classes in France and abroad, and has recorded an instructional DVD (Virtuosity and Velocity, 1997).

Patrick Rondat has his signature Ibanez guitar signatur the PRM1X model.

== Discography ==
=== Albums ===
Title	Release	Remarks
Time (with The Element)	1985	First release with ex-Warning singer "Raphael Garrido" and bassist "Frederic Guillemet", first TV appearance ever with "Rapha" (vocals), "Fredo Guillemet" (bass), "Manu Bensi" (drums), and "Fred Bensi" (keyboards)
Just for fun	1989	re-release 2002
Rape of the Earth	1991	re-release in 1993 & 2002
Amphibia	1996	-
Amphibia	1997	Japanese release with bonus live track - Ultimate Dreams
Amphibia	1998	European release with 2 bonus live tracks - Burn Out, and Just For Fun
On the Edge	1999	With Michel Petrucciani, Didier Lockwood, and Tommy Aldridge
Forbidden Fruit (with Elegy)	2000	With Dirk Bruinenberg on drums
Principle of Pain (With Elegy)	2002	-
An Ephemeral World	2004	With Dirk Bruinenberg - drums (Elegy, Adagio), Patrice Guers - bass (Rhapsody of Fire), and Manu Martin - keyboards
Patrick Rondat & Hervé N'Kaoua	2008	With Hervé N'Kaoua on Piano
Super Eurobeat 197 ~King Of Eurobeat~	2009	Performed "Fire Dragon" with Dave Rodgers (Giancarlo Pasquini) on vocals
Escape from Shadows	2025	-
