= BE (Pain of Salvation album) =

Studio album by Pain of Salvation
- Released: 27 September 2004
- Recorded: Sweden, February–July 2004
- Genre: Progressive metal
- Length: 75:53
- Label: InsideOut
- Producer: Daniel Gildenlöw

Pain of Salvation chronology
12:5 (2004)	BE (2004)	Scarsick (2007)

Professional ratings
Review scores
Source	Rating
AllMusic	2/5 stars
Sputnikmusic	3.5/5 stars
Silencio Hungary	2/5 stars
RevelationZ	4/5 stars
Sea of Tranquillity	4.5/5 stars

BE is the fifth studio album by Swedish band Pain of Salvation, released via InsideOutMusic in September 2004. It is a concept album focusing on the existence of God and humankind. Along with the band it features a nine-part orchestra, The Orchestra of Eternity, which features prominently throughout the album. It is the last album to feature Kristoffer Gildenlöw on bass and is the first Pain of Salvation album to be divided into more than three chapters.

The band performed it live as a rock opera. It was released as "BE" (Original Stage Production).

== Outline ==
BE attempts to explore the many facets of human existence. It begins with the narration of Animae, someone or something who/that has existed for as long as they/it can remember and contemplate the nature of their/its existence and then begins a journey of understanding with the words: "I will call myself GOD and I will spend the rest of forever trying to figure out who I am". The story continues from there. The characters that appear and disappear throughout the story are as follows:

- Animae: Animae is the album's representation of God, or a Godhead.
- Nauticus: Nauticus is the name of a fictional space probe that is, according to the album, the most intelligent space probe ever to be created. In reference to the marine 'neighborhood', Nauticus 'drifts' throughout space, searching for answers to save Earth from itself.
- Imago: Imago is the image of humanity in its most natural form. Combined, Imago is the reflection of Animae.
- Dea Pecuniae: Dea Pecuniae can be seen as a feminine version of Mr. Money, and the Eve of humanity's dark side. In a way, she represents sin.
- Mr. Money: Mr. Money is the main character of the story; a man with the most wealth on Earth, who spends most of it on cryogenics in order to fulfill his wish - to be frozen, and not to be awakened until he is made immortal. He represents the darker side of humanity, being the Adam for Dea Pecuniae.

The sound and style are somewhat more varied than previous Pain of Salvation albums, but at the same time, calling upon those previous albums as influences. The album includes: narrative passages; a folk-like song; a gospel-prayer-like song; a church-hymn-like song; progressive metal songs; a classical piano/strings piece; a conversation with a radio in the background; news readings; and even a song that would not be out of place in a Broadway musical. Another song consists entirely of voice messages to be left on "God's answering machine". To approach this song, the band asks the subscribers of their newsletter to call a certain phone number and say what ever they would want to say to God.

In writing "BE", Daniel Gildenlöw used many resources for information, insights and inspiration. These are intended as "points of departure" for listeners to continue their "own journey through "BE" ".

== Track listing ==
Prologue

01. Animae Partus ("I Am") - A God Is Born ("I Am") 1:48

"BE" (CHINASSIAH)

I Animae Partus

All in the Image of

02. Deus Nova - New God 3:18

03. Imago (Homines Partus) - Imago (Man Is Born) 5:11

04. Pluvius Aestivus - Summer Rain 5:00

Of Summer Rain (Homines Fabula Initium) - Of Summer Rain (The Story of Man Begins)

As is evident by the list to the left, the track listing and structure of the album are very detailed and confusing.

II Machinassiah

Of Gods & Slaves

05. Lilium Cruentus (Deus Nova) - Blood Stained Lily (New God) 5:28

On the Loss of Innocence

06. Nauticus (Drifting) - Nauticus (Drifting) 4:58

07. Dea Pecuniae - Goddess of Money 10:09

I Mr. Money
II Permanere
III I Raise My Glass

III Machinageddon

Nemo Idoneus Aderat Qui Responderet

08. Vocari Dei - Messages to God 3:50

Sordes Aetas - Mess Age

09. Diffidentia (Breaching the Core) - Mistrust (Breaching the Core) 7:26

Exitus - Drifting II

10. Nihil Morari - Nothing Remains

(Homines Fabula Finis) - The Story of Man Comes to an End 6:21

IV Machinauticus

Of the Ones with no Hope

11. Latericius Valete - If You Are Strong, Be Strong 2:27

12. Omni - Everything 2:37

Permanere?

13. Iter Impius - Wicked Path 6:21

Martius, Son of Mars
Obitus Diutinus

14. Martius/Nauticus II - Martius/Nauticus II 6:41

V Deus Nova Mobile

...And a God Is Born

15. Animae Partus II 4:08

Concept, research, original stories, lyrics, narrations and texts by Daniel Gildenlöw. All music by Daniel Gildenlöw, except "Iter Impius" by Fredrik Hermansson. All orchestral arrangements by Daniel Gildenlöw, except "Imago" by Jan Levander and Daniel Gildenlöw and "Iter Impius" by Fredrik Hermansson. News casts, fake interview and other "snipplets" written by Kim Howatt, Jim Howatt and Daniel Gildenlöw.

== Credits ==
=== Band ===
- Daniel Gildenlöw - Vocals, choirs, voices, harmony vocals; electric and acoustic guitar; mandola; Chinese archo; keyboards; percussion on toms, rototoms, mandola (body), eggs, floors, broken cymbals and what-have-you; samplers and programming.
- Fredrik Hermansson - Grand piano, harpsichord and keyboards; percussion on large toms;
- Johan Hallgren - Electric and acoustic guitars; harmony vocals; percussion on congas.
- Johan Langell - drums; backing vocals; percussion on djembe and cowbell.
- Kristoffer Gildenlöw - Bass and Fretless bass; double bass; harmony vocals; percussion on congas.

=== The Orchestra of Eternity ===
- Mihai Cucu - 1st violin
- Camilla Arvidsson - 2nd violin
- Kristina Ekman - viola
- Magnus Lanning - cello
- Åsa Karlberg - flute
- Anette Kumlin - oboe
- Nils-Åke Pettersson - clarinet
- Dries van den Poel - bass clarinet
- Sven-Olof Juvas - tuba

=== Guest Musicians ===
- Mats Stenlund - church organ
- Cecilia Ringkvist - vocals

=== Other ===
- Donald Morgan - narration
- Donald K. Morgan - narration
- Alex R. Morgan - narration
- Kim Howatt - news reading, Cindy (Sandra!)
- Jim Howatt - news reading
- Jackie Crotinger - news reading
- Ross Crotinger - news reading
- Tom Kleich - Mr. Money on radio
- Blair Wilson - interviewer on radio, Miss Mediocrety
- Gaby Howatt - Miss Mediocrety
- Molly Fahey - "There's room for all God's creatures..."
- Various people from around the world - voice messages to God

=== Visual ===
- Lars Ardarve - photography
- Per Hillblom
- Kim Howatt - photography
- Jim Howatt - photography
- Kristoffer Gildenlöw - photography
- Daniel Gildenlöw - photography, artwork, logotypes

== Charts ==
Chart performance for BE
Chart (2026)	Peak position
Greek Albums (IFPI)	45
