= Remedy Lane =

Studio album by Pain of Salvation
- Released: 15 January 2002
- Recorded: 2001
- Studio: Roasting House Recording Studio (Malmö, Sweden)
- Genre: Progressive metal
- Length: 68:12
- Label: InsideOut Music
- Producer: Daniel Gildenlöw and Anders "Theo" Theander

Pain of Salvation chronology
The Perfect Element, Part I (2000)	Remedy Lane (2002)	12:5 (2004)

Professional ratings
Review scores
Source	Rating
Allmusic	4.5/5 stars
Metal Storm	9/10
Progmind	5/5 stars

Remedy Lane is the fourth album by Swedish progressive rock band Pain of Salvation, released in January 2002. It is a concept album focusing on a character's search for self-discovery. It was described by Allmusic as Pain of Salvation's breakthrough album.

== Outline ==
While both Remedy Lane and Pain of Salvation's second album, One Hour by the Concrete Lake, feature a protagonist searching for self-discovery, Remedy Lane addresses a wider variety of themes, including love, loss, lust, sex and self-understanding. The album, written by guitarist and vocalist Daniel Gildenlöw, is semi-autobiographical in nature. The liner notes include poems and photos related to the concept as well as date markings to signify the chronological order of the album. Gildenlöw has said that the inspiration for Remedy Lane was an era of his life in which he wished to understand the nature of freedom.

The album's production is similar to its predecessor, The Perfect Element, part I. While its mood is dark, there are some moments of happiness.

== Reissue ==
On 1 July 2016 the band released a reissue of the album, entitled Remedy Lane Re:visited (Re:mixed & Re:lived). The 2-CD set includes a new mix of the record by longtime Pain of Salvation collaborator and mixing engineer Jens Bogren at Fascination Street Studios, as well as a live recording of the entire album from Pain of Salvation's performance at the ProgPower USA Festival in 2014.

== Track listing ==
All lyrics by Daniel Gildenlöw. All music by Daniel Gildenlöw, except instrumental part of "Rope Ends" by Daniel Gildenlöw and Fredrik Hermansson.

No.	Title	Length
1.	"Of Two Beginnings"	2:24

Chapter I
No.	Title	Length
2.	"Ending Theme"	4:59
3.	"Fandango"	5:51
4.	"A Trace of Blood"	8:17
5.	"This Heart of Mine (I Pledge)"	4:01

Chapter II
No.	Title	Length
6.	"Undertow"	4:47
7.	"Rope Ends"	7:02
8.	"Chain Sling"	3:58
9.	"Dryad of the Woods" (instrumental)	4:56

Chapter III
No.	Title	Length
10.	"Remedy Lane" (instrumental)	2:15
11.	"Waking Every God"	5:19
12.	"Second Love"	4:21
13.	"Beyond the Pale"	9:56

The Japanese edition of this album also contains a bonus track titled "Thorn Clown" that is sequenced between "This Heart of Mine (I Pledge)" and "Undertow". However, the Official Pain of Salvation Website shows the song as inserted between "Dryad of the Woods" and "Remedy Lane".

== Personnel ==
- Daniel Gildenlöw - lead vocals, guitar, concept and lyrics
- Kristoffer Gildenlöw - bass, backing vocals
- Johan Hallgren - guitar, backing vocals
- Fredrik Hermansson - keyboards
- Johan Langell - drums, backing vocals

Additional personnel

- Anders "Theo" Theander - producer, engineering
- Pontus Lindmark - engineering
- Jörgen Tannander - editing
- Johanna Iggsten - photography
