= Lost (Elegy album) =

Studio album by Elegy
- Released: 25 July 1995
- Genre: Power metal
- Length: 48:09
- Label: T&T / Noise
- Producer: Elegy

Elegy chronology
Supremacy (1994)	Lost (1995)	State of Mind (1997)

Lost, released in 1995, is the third album by Dutch power metal band Elegy.

== Track listing ==
1. "Lost" - 4:41
2. "Everything" - 6:00
3. "Clean Up Your Act" - 5:03
4. "Always with You" - 4:33
5. "Under Gods Naked Eyes" - 4:51
6. "1998 (The Prophecy)" (instrumental) - 2:34
7. "Spirits" - 6:44
8. "Crossed the Line" - 5:30
9. "Live It Again" - 4:10
10. "Spanish Inquisition" - 4:03

=== Bonus Tracks (2009 re-release) ===
- "I’m No Fool" (demo 1990)
- "Labyrinth of Dreams" (demo 1990)

== Contributing Members ==
- Eduard Hovinga - vocal, guitars (track 5)
- Henk Van Der Laars - guitars, bass (track 5)
- Gilbert Pot - guitars
- Martin Helmantel - bass
- Dirk Bruinenberg - drums
- Gerrit Nager - keyboards
