= Sign (band) =

Icelandic rock band

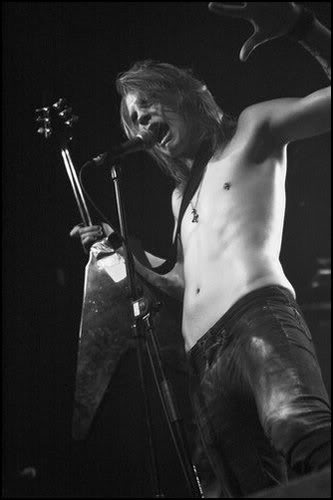

Background information
- Also known as: Halim
- Origin: Hafnarfjörður, Iceland
- Genres: Hard rock, alternative rock
- Years active: 2000–present
- Labels: R&R Music
- Members: Ragnar Zolberg; Arnar Grétarsson; Hálfdán Árnason; Ragnar Ólafsson; Heimir Hjartarson; Aggi Friðbertsson; Hrafnkell Örn; Leo Margarit
- Past members: Egill Örn Rafnsson; Sigurður Ágúst; Hörður Stefánsson; Baldvin Freyr; Silli Geirdal; Jon Skäre

Sign is an Icelandic rock band that was formed in 2000, as Halim, to compete in the Icelandic version of the Battle of the bands called Musiktilraunir. The band's frontman and founding member Ragnar Zolberg is also a solo artist and was a guitar player in the Swedish band Pain of Salvation. Sign has toured with bands such as Wednesday 13, The Wildhearts, Aiden, The Answer, Skid Row and played a show with Alice Cooper in Iceland. In August 2007 Sign played their first headline tour of the UK.

On 10 June 2008, Sign opened for Whitesnake in Reykjavik, Iceland. On 14 June 2008, Sign were the first band to play on the mainstage at Download Festival, Donington Park.

Sign recorded a cover of Iron Maiden's "Run to the Hills" on the tribute album Maiden Heaven: A Tribute to Iron Maiden released by Kerrang! magazine.

In 2013 Sign released their fifth album called "Hermd", the album is currently only available in Iceland. The album was co-produced by Sign, Daniel Bergstrand and Sorg&Umbreit and recorded at Dugout Studio in Uppsala, Sweden and Principal studios, Germany.

== Personnel ==
=== Members ===
Current members

- Ragnar Zolberg - vocals, guitars (2000–present)
- Arnar Grétarsson - guitars (2004–present)
- Heimir Hjartarson - bass (2007–present)
- Hálfdán Árnason - bass (2012–present)
- Aggi Friðbertsson - guitar, keyboards (2008–present)
- Ragnar Ólafsson - keyboards, vocals (2013–present)
- Hrafnkell Örn - drums (2013–present)
- Leo Margarit - drums (2013–present)

Former members

- Egill Örn Rafnsson - drums (2000–2009)
- Sigurður Ágúst - bass (2000–2003)
- Hörður Stefánsson - guitars (2000–2001)
- Baldvin Freyr (Baddi) - guitars (2001–2004)
- Silli Geirdal - bass (2004–2007)
- Jon Skäre - drums (2009–2012)

=== Lineups ===
2000-2001	2001-2003	2003-2004	2004-2007
Ragnar Sólberg Rafnsson - vocals, guitars; Sigurður Ágúst - bass; Egill Örn Rafnsson - drums; Hörður Stefánsson - guitars	Ragnar Sólberg Rafnsson - vocals, guitars; Sigurður Ágúst - bass; Egill Örn Rafnsson - drums; Baldvin Freyr - guitars	Ragnar Sólberg Rafnsson - vocals, guitars; Egill Örn Rafnsson - drums; Baldvin Freyr - guitars	Ragnar Sólberg Rafnsson - vocals, guitars; Egill Örn Rafnsson - drums; Silli Geirdal - bass; Arnar Grétarsson - guitars
2007-2008	2008-2009	2009-2012	2013–present
Ragnar Sólberg Rafnsson - vocals, guitars; Egill Örn Rafnsson - drums; Arnar Grétarsson - guitars; Heimir Hjartarson - bass	Ragnar Sólberg Rafnsson - vocals, guitars; Egill Örn Rafnsson - drums; Arnar Grétarsson - guitars; Heimir Hjartarson - bass; Aggi Friðbertsson - guitar, keyboards	Ragnar Sólberg Rafnsson - vocals, guitars; Arnar Grétarsson - guitars; Heimir Hjartarson - bass; Aggi Friðbertsson - guitar, keyboards; Jon Skäre - drums	Ragnar Sólberg Rafnsson - vocals, guitars; Arnar Grétarsson - guitars; Aggi Friðbertsson - guitar, keyboards; Ragnar Ólafsson - keyboards, vocals; Hrafkell Örn - drums; Leo Margarit - drums; Heimir Hjartarson - bass; Hálfdán Árnason - bass

== Discography ==
=== Albums ===
- Vindar og Breytingar (2001)
- Fyrir Ofan Himininn (2002)
- Thank God for Silence (2005)
- The Hope (2007)
- Hermd (2013)

=== EP ===
- Sign EP (2004)
- Out from the Dirt EP (2012)

=== Singles ===
- "So Pretty" Single (2006)

=== Sampler ===
- Maiden Heaven (2008)
- Higher Voltage!: Another Brief History of Rock (2007)

== Tours ==
- 16 September - 5 October 2006 - Opening for Wednesday 13 on 18 concerts in Germany, Great Britain, The Netherlands, France and Belgium.
- May 2007 - Opening for The Wildhearts in Great Britain
- 8–17 August 2007 - Signs first head-line tour in Great Britain, 10 concerts.
- 13 November - 1 December 2007 - Opening for Skid Row on 13 concerts in Great Britain and Iceland.
- 1–11 April 2008 - 7 concerts in Iceland with Benny Crespo's Gang and Dr. Spock
- 13 May - 1 June 2008 - Opening for Wednesday 13 on 11 concerts in Great Britain
- 10 June 2008 - Opening for Whitesnake in Iceland
- 1–31 October 2008 - Opening for Aiden in UK and Europe
