= Road Salt One =

Studio album by Pain of Salvation
- Released: 17 May 2010
- Genre: Progressive rock, art rock
- Length: 51:18
- Label: InsideOut
- Producer: Pain of Salvation

Pain of Salvation chronology
Linoleum (EP) (2009)	Road Salt One (2010)	Road Salt Two (2011)

Road Salt One is the seventh studio album by Swedish band Pain of Salvation, released 17 May 2010 on InsideOut. While a concept album in keeping with all previous Pain of Salvation albums, the album was more song-oriented and streamlined in its production values.

== Outline ==
Daniel Gildenlöw has described the album in interviews as sounding more "jam oriented" with tracks that sound like they have been "recorded live in the rehearsal room". He indicated that the intent of the album was to go "back to letting the song be the focal point" by having the album feature "just us. Playing a song meant to touch your heart. Stripped down. Naked. Brave. Old school".

Gildenlöw described the concept of Road Salt One as being many parallel stories:

it’s not like a chronological story like the other albums. It’s like several parallel stories and once you look at them together they start vibrating at the same speed or frequency and that’s where you get the story...The whole idea is to compare situations or chains of events, compare them to roads and choose what roads you want to take and the roads will lead you to different places...whatever road you are traveling down at different points in the movie they will be keyframes. At that position, you could see things from a different perspective than you normally would. Many of these songs are these key frames and sort of singularities and special points on the different roads from all these different people doing the different things. That’s where everything connects.

Gildenlöw has also compared the album's plot to the film Magnolia in interviews.

Around the inside lips of the back cover is the following sentence: "This album, however, is NOT a part of The Perfect Element concept...but for what it's worth, it easily COULD have been, right? Right?"

== Track listing ==
Concept, music and lyrics by Daniel Gildenlöw.

=== Standard Edition ===
No.	Title	Length
1.	"No Way"	5:26
2.	"She Likes to Hide"	2:57
3.	"Sisters"	6:15
4.	"Of Dust"	2:32
5.	"Tell Me You Don't Know"	2:42
6.	"Sleeping Under the Stars"	3:37
7.	"Darkness of Mine"	4:15
8.	"Linoleum"	4:55
9.	"Curiosity"	3:33
10.	"Where It Hurts"	4:51
11.	"Road Salt"	3:02
12.	"Innocence"	7:13

=== Limited Edition Digipack ===
1. "What She Means to Me" (Bonus track) - 0:50
2. "No Way" (Extended version) - 7:09
3. "She Likes to Hide" - 2:57
4. "Sisters" - 6:15
5. "Of Dust" - 2:32
6. "Tell Me You Don't Know" - 2:42
7. "Sleeping Under the Stars" - 3:37
8. "Darkness of Mine" - 4:15
9. "Linoleum" - 4:55
10. "Curiosity" - 3:33
11. "Where It Hurts" - 4:51
12. "Road Salt" (Extended version) - 4:40
13. "Innocence" - 7:13

The Japanese edition has a bonus track after "Innocence" titled "Tip Toe Two". The drum parts in the song are played by Daniel Gildenlöw.

== Personnel ==
- Daniel Gildenlöw - lead vocals, backing vocals, electric and acoustic and fretless guitars, bass guitar (tracks 2–11), organs, piano, mandolin, lute, balalaika, drums (tracks 2–6), keyboards
- Johan Hallgren - electric guitars (tracks 1, 3, 7–10, and 12), backing vocals
- Fredrik Hermansson - electric and acoustic pianos, organs, mellotron, other keyboards
- Léo Margarit - drums, backing vocals

Guest musicians

- Jonas Reingold - bass guitar ("No Way")
- Gustaf Hielm - bass guitar ("Innocence")
- Mihai Anton Cucu - violin ("Sisters" and "Innocence")
- Camilla Arvidsson - violin ("Sisters" and "Innocence")
- Kristina Ekman - viola ("Sisters" and "Innocence")
