= Kristoffer Gildenlöw =

Swedish musician and songwriter (born 1978)

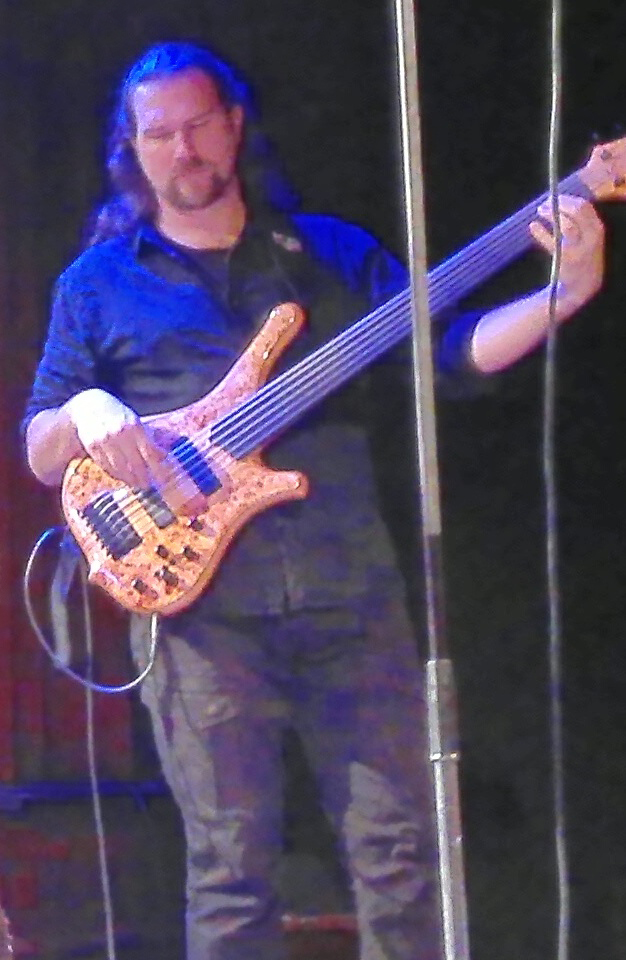
- Gildenlöw performing in 2018

Background information
- Born: David Kristoffer Gildenlöw; July 27, 1978 (age 47); Eskilstuna, Sweden
- Genres: Progressive metal, progressive rock, symphonic rock
- Occupation(s): Musician, songwriter, singer
- Instrument(s): Bass, vocals, cello
- Years active: 1994–present
- Labels: New Joke Music

Kristoffer Gildenlöw (born 1978) is a Swedish musician and songwriter, best known as a former bassist of progressive rock band Pain of Salvation.

== Early life and education ==
Gildenlöw was born in Eskilstuna, Sweden. He studied piano for six years until stopping at the age of 13. He changed over to drums and bass guitar and started taking bass lessons at the age of 14. He went on to study electric bass, classical vocals, double bass, and music design.

== Career ==
=== Pain of Salvation 1994–2006 ===
In 1994, at the age of 16 years, Gildenlöw joined Pain of Salvation as a new bass player and became a member of the band. This line-up of the Gildenlöw brothers (Kristoffer and Daniel), Johan Langell, and Daniel Magdic recorded a demo called Hereafter, which the band sent out to record companies. They were signed by Avalon (Japan) for their first album Entropia and by InsideOut Music (DE) in 1998. Kristoffer Gildenlöw performed on the following Pain of Salvation studio albums: Entropia (1997), One Hour by the Concrete Lake (1998), The Perfect Element, Part I (2000), Remedy Lane (2002), BE (2004). In addition to the albums, Gildenlöw performed on the live albums 12:5 (2003) and BE Live (2004), as well as the single "Ashes" (2000). There were several demos and unofficial releases of Pain of Salvation that also featured Gildenlöw's bass play: Hereafter (demo, 1996), The Painful Chronicles (magazine compilation album), and Live in Barcelona (fan club release).

=== Session musician and side projects: 2006–present ===
In 2003, Gildenlöw left Sweden and moved to The Netherlands. In 2006 he left Pain of Salvation. The next six years were focused on creating his first solo album, but he also remained active in the music scene recording bass for various artists. In addition to studio recordings, Gildenlöw worked as a session musician for live performances and touring. He's been recording and touring with international artists such as Neal Morse, Damian Wilson, Lana Lane, Bert Herink, Lesoir, Kingfisher Sky, Mr. Fastfinger and many more. See discography.

One of Gildenlöw's side projects is the progressive rock band Dial, founded in late 2003 by Liselotte Hegt, Rommert van der Meer and Gildenlöw. In the summer 2006, the band recorded their debut album Synchronized together with producer Devon Graves (of Deadsoul Tribe and Psychotic Waltz). The album was released in May 2007 through ProgRock Records.

In 2017, Gildenlöw joined the renowned prog band Kayak for the recording and touring of their new album 17. Gildenlöw continued to record and play with Kayak until the band finally stopped in 2025, with the release of their last live album/DVD Back To Shore. The album was filmed and recorded during their 2022 farewell tour.

=== Solo artist: 2012–present ===
Gildenlöw's solo career as a singer-songwriter took flight with the release of his debut album Rust (2012), which he had been working on for six years. It featured a wide range of guest musicians, including Ruud Jolie (Within Temptation), Fredrik Hermansson (ex-Pain of Salvation), Ola Hedén (ex-The Flower Kings).

Gildenlöw's second solo album, The Rain, was released in 2016. It features Fredrik Hermansson (ex-Pain of Salvation), Lars Erik Asp (Gazpacho) on drums and percussion, Paul Coenradie (Valentine) on guitar, Anne Bakker (Blaze Bayley) on violins and viola, and Maaike Peterse (Ayreon, Kingfisher Sky and Kovacs) on cello.

Third album Homebound (2020) came out just at the eve of the COVID-19 pandemic. Again, the album had several established guest musicians joining.

During the pandemic Gildenlöw recorded the album Let Me Be A Ghost (2021). A dark album, dealing with different aspects of depression.

In 2024, Gildenlöw's fifth solo album Empty was finally released. It was supposed to be released in 2020, as a quick followup to the Homebound-album, but due to the pandemic and ruling curfews, he wasn't able to finish recordings with all guest musicians. Empty looks at humans and humanity through different perspectives: humans, human race and humanity.

== Discography ==
=== Solo ===
- Rust (2012)
- The Rain (2016)
- Homebound (2020)
- Let Me Be A Ghost (2021)
- Empty (2024)

=== Pain of Salvation ===
- Hereafter (1996) (demo)
- Entropia (1997)
- One Hour by the Concrete Lake (1998)
- The Perfect Element, Part I (2000)
- Remedy Lane (2002)
- 12:5 (2003, live album)
- BE (2004)
- BE Live (2004, live album)
- Ending Themes (On the Two Deaths of Pain of Salvation) (2009, DVD)
- Remedy Lane Re:Visited (2016)
- Remedy Lane Re:Mixed (2016)

=== Kayak ===
- Seventeen (2018)
- Live (2020)
- Out of This World (2021)
- Back to Shore (2025)

=== Breaking the Chains ===
- We Are Breaking the Chains (2018)
