= Rape of the Earth =

Studio album by Patrick Rondat
- Released: 1991
- Genre: Neoclassical metal
- Length: 55:42
- Labels: Food For Thought Records, Music For Nations
- Producer: Patrick Rondat

Patrick Rondat chronology
Just for Fun (1989)	Rape of the Earth (1991)	Amphibia (1996)

Rape of the Earth is a second album from French neoclassical guitarist Patrick Rondat.

== Track listing ==
No.	Title	Writer(s)	Length
1.	"Ultimate Dreams"	Patrick Rondat	4:49
2.	"Mindscape"	Rondat	4:50
3.	"Barbarians at the Gates"	Rondat	7:56
4.	"The Last Whale"	Rondat	7:31
5.	"Burn Out"	Rondat	6:47
6.	"Nuages"	Django Reinhardt	6:26
7.	"Rape of the Earth"	Rondat	4:45
8.	"Visions"	Rondat	6:04
9.	"World of Silence"	Rondat	6:19
Total length:			55:42

== Personnel ==
- Pascal Mulot - Bass
- Christian Namour - Drums
- Patrick Rondat - Guitar
- Didier Erard - Keyboards

== Charts ==
Chart performance for Rape of the Earth
Chart (2026)	Peak position
French Rock & Metal Albums (SNEP)	83
