= State of Mind (Elegy album) =

Studio album by Elegy
- Released: 1997
- Recorded: Markant Studios, Heeze, The Netherlands
- Genre: Power metal
- Length: 45:36
- Label: T&T/Noise
- Producer: Elegy

Elegy chronology
| Lost (1995) | State of Mind (1997) | Manifestation of Fear (1998) |

State of Mind, released in 1997, is an album by Netherlands power metal band Elegy.

== Track listing ==
1. "Equinox (Instrumental)" (Henk Van De Laars) - 1:39
2. "Visual Vortex" (Dirk Bruinenberg, Van De Laars, Ian Parry) - 4:45
3. "Trust" (Van De Laars, Parry) - 4:01
4. "Beyond" (Parry) - 5:05
5. "Shadow Dancer" (Bruinenberg, Van De Laars, Parry) - 4:13
6. "Aladdin's Cave" (Parry) - 5:39
7. "State of Mind" (Bruinenberg, Van De Laars, Parry) - 3:33
8. "Destiny Calling" (Parry) - 6:32
9. "Resurrection (Instrumental)" (Van De Laars) - 1:03
10. "Loser's Game" (Van De Laars, Parry) - 3:57
11. "Suppression" (Parry) - 5:09

=== Bonus Tracks (2009 re-release) ===
- "Trust" (demo)
- "Shadow dancer" (demo)
- "Suppression" (demo)
- "Visual Vortex" (video)

=== Japan Bonus Track ===
- "Sweet Revenge"

== Line-up ==
=== Band Members ===
- Ian Parry - vocals, keyboards
- Henk Van De Laars - guitars, keyboards
- Dirk Bruinenberg - drums
- Martin Helmantel - bass

=== Guest Artists ===
- Bart Brower - piano
- Melly Oudejans - violin
