= Linoleum (EP) =

EP by Pain of Salvation
- Released: 16 November 2009
- Genre: Progressive metal
- Label: InsideOut Music
- Producer: Pain of Salvation

Pain of Salvation chronology
Ending Themes (On the Two Deaths of Pain of Salvation) (2009)	Linoleum (2009)	Road Salt One (2010)

Linoleum is an EP by Swedish progressive metal band Pain of Salvation. It features one song each from Road Salt One and Road Salt Two, two exclusive non-album tracks, a satirical spoken bonus track, and a cover of "Yellow Raven" by Scorpions.

It was released on 16 November 2009 and a release party was held on 14 November at The Cave Rock Club in Sundbyberg, Stockholm, where the band played and sold signed copies of it.

Around the inside lips of the back cover is the following sentence: "This album, however, is NOT a part of The Perfect Element concept...but for what it's worth, it easily COULD have been, right? Right?"

== Track listing ==
All lyrics are written by Daniel Gildenlöw except for "Yellow Raven" by Uli Jon Roth; all music is composed by Daniel Gildenlöw, except for "Yellow Raven" by Uli Jon Roth.

No.	Title	Length
1.	"Linoleum"	4:54
2.	"Mortar Grind"	5:50
3.	"If You Wait"	2:29
4.	"Gone"	7:54
5.	"Bonus Track B"	2:27
6.	"Yellow Raven"	5:39
Total length:		29:13
