= Ian Parry (singer) =

British heavy metal singer

Ian Parry is a British heavy metal singer.

In the 1980s and early 1990s he was the singer for Dutch heavy metal bands Hammerhead and Vengeance, moving on to another Dutch band Elegy.

Parry also embarked on an eponymous project, releasing the first album Symphony of Dreams in 1993. Following 1994's Artistic Licence, 1995's Thru' the Looking Glass had Arjen Lucassen as a guest. Parry also set up the Ian Parry's Consortium Project.

In the mid-2000s, Parry was recruited on vocals by Greek band Crystal Tears for their second album., Generation X. In 2009 he sang for the Danish band Infinity Overture.

== Solo discography ==
=== Ian Parry ===
- Symphony of Dreams (1993)
- Artistic Licence (1994)
- Thru' the Looking Glass (1995)
- Shadowman (compilation, 2000)
- Visions (2006)
- In Flagrante Delicto (2020)

=== Consortium Project ===
- Ian Parry's Consortium Project (1999)
- Consortium Project II - Continuum in Extremis (2001)
- Consortium Project III - Terra Incognita (The Undiscovered World) (2003)
- Consortium Project IV - Children of Tomorrow (2007)
- Consortium Project V - Species (2011)
- Consortium Project VI - Legacy of Empires (2026)

=== Ian Parry's Rock Emporium ===
- Society of Friends (2016)
- Brute Force (2021)
