= Supremacy (Elegy album) =

Studio album by Elegy
- Released: 1 June 1994
- Genre: Power metal
- Length: 46:58
- Label: T&T / Noise
- Producer: Elegy

Elegy chronology
Labyrinth of Dreams (1992)	Supremacy (1994)	Lost (1995)

Supremacy, released in 1994, is the second album by Dutch power metal band Elegy.

== Track listing ==
1. "Windows of the World" – 5:10
2. "Angel´s Grace" – 7:09
3. "Poisoned Hearts" – 5:26
4. "Lust for Life" – 5:21
5. "Anouk" (instrumental) – 1:53
6. "Circles in the Sand" – 4:42
7. "Darkest Night" – 4:10
8. "Close Your Eyes" – 0:39
9. "Supremacy" – 5:01
10. "Erase Me" – 7:27

=== Bonus Tracks (2009 re-release) ===
- "All Systems Go" (instrumental, demo)
- "The Grand Change" (demo)

== Contributing Artists ==
=== Band members ===
- Eduard Hovinga – vocals, guitars (track 4)
- Martin Helmantel – bass
- Henk van de Laars – guitars, keyboards
- Gilbert Pot – guitars, keyboards
- Dirk Bruinenberg – drums, keyboards

=== Guest Artists ===
- Stefan Schneider-Reuter – keyboards
- Andreas Hirschmann – keyboards
