= Road Salt Two =

Studio album by Pain of Salvation
- Released: 26 September 2011
- Genre: Progressive rock, art rock, blues rock
- Length: 53:35
- Label: InsideOut
- Producer: Pain of Salvation

Pain of Salvation chronology
Road Salt One (2010)	Road Salt Two (2011)	Falling Home (2014)

Road Salt Two is the eighth studio album by Swedish band Pain of Salvation, released on 26 September 2011 by InsideOut. It is the final album to feature keyboardist Fredrik Hermansson, who had appeared on all previous releases by the band. Around the inside lips of the back cover is the following sentence: "This album, however, is NOT a part of The Perfect Element concept...but for what it's worth, it easily COULD have been, right? Right?"

== Track listing ==
Concept, music and lyrics by Daniel Gildenlöw.

=== Standard Edition ===
No.	Title	Length
1.	"Road Salt Theme"	0:45
2.	"Softly She Cries"	4:15
3.	"Conditioned"	4:15
4.	"Healing Now"	4:29
5.	"To the Shoreline"	3:03
6.	"Eleven"	6:55
7.	"1979"	2:53
8.	"The Deeper Cut"	6:10
9.	"Mortar Grind"	5:46
10.	"Through the Distance"	2:56
11.	"The Physics of Gridlock"	8:43
12.	"End Credits"	3:25

=== Limited Edition Digipack ===
1. "Road Salt Theme" – 0:45
2. "Softly She Cries" – 4:15
3. "Conditioned" – 4:15
4. "Healing Now" – 4:29
5. "To the Shoreline" – 3:03
6. "Break Darling Break" (bonus track) – 2:22
7. "Eleven" – 6:55
8. "1979" – 2:53
9. "Of Salt" (bonus track) – 2:36
10. "The Deeper Cut" – 6:10
11. "Mortar Grind" – 5:46
12. "Through the Distance" – 2:56
13. "The Physics of Gridlock" – 8:43
14. "End Credits" – 3:25

The Japanese edition includes both bonus tracks from the limited edition, with an addition of "Last Night" and "Thirty-Eight"

== Personnel ==
- Daniel Gildenlöw – lead vocals, backing vocals, electric and acoustic and fretless guitars, bass guitar
- Johan Hallgren – electric guitars, backing vocals, lead vocals on "Softly She Cries"
- Fredrik Hermansson – electric and acoustic pianos, organs, mellotron, other keyboards
- Léo Margarit – drums, backing vocals
