= Labyrinth of Dreams (album) =

Studio album by Elegy
- Released: 1992
- Genre: Power metal
- Length: 41:54
- Label: T&T / Noise
- Producer: Elegy

Elegy chronology
Labyrinth of Dreams (1992)	Supremacy (1994)

Labyrinth of Dreams, released in 1992, is the debut album by Dutch power metal band Elegy. It reached number 42 on the album charts in Japan.

== Track listing ==
1. "The Grand Change" – 4:42
2. "I'm No Fool" – 4:56
3. "Take My Love" – 4:47
4. "All Systems Go" (instrumental) – 2:56
5. "Trouble in Paradise" – 5:36
6. "Over and Out" – 3:42
7. "Labyrinth of Dreams" – 6:10
8. "Mass Hysteria" (instrumental) – 1:25
9. "Powergames" – 4:25
10. "The Guiding Light" – 3:15

=== Bonus Tracks (2009 re-release) ===
- "The Guiding Light" (demo)
- "Ballad" (demo, instrumental)
- "I'm No Fool" (video)

== Contributing members ==
- Eduard Hovinga – vocals
- Henk van de Laars – guitars
- Arno Van Brussel – guitars
- Martin Helmantel – bass
- Ton van de Stroom – keyboards
- Ed Warby – drums
