= Crystal Tears (band) =

Greek speed metal band

Crystal Tears is a Greek speed/power metal band.

The band was formed in 1997 and was able to release their debut album on Pure Steel Records in 2006. Ian Parry was recruited on vocals for their second album. The band, led by drummer Chrisafis Tantanozis, later added Søren Adamsen as a singer and Mate Nagy on guitars.

== Discography ==
- Choirs of Immortal (2006)
- Generation X (2010)
- Hellmade (2014)
- Decadence Deluxe (2018)
- Athanato (2025)
