= Cloudmachine =

Dutch indie rock band

- Origin: Haarlem, Netherlands
- Genres: alternative rock, indie rock, alternative pop
- Years active: 2003–2014
- Past members: Ruud Houweling; Richard Lagerweij; Michiel van Zundert; Marco Kuypers; Ray Edgar Duyns; René Dissel; Mike Coolen
- Website: cloudmachine.nl

Cloudmachine was an eclectic indie rock band hailing from the Netherlands, founded by songwriter and composer Ruud Houweling (Alphen aan den Rijn, July 29, 1968) who fronts the band, singing and playing guitar. Other band members were: Marco Kuypers (keyboards), Mike Coolen (drums), Richard Lagerweij (guitars) and Ray Edgar Duyns (bass). The style of music can be described as atmospheric with a melancholic undertone. The songs are always constructed with 'real' instruments, part acoustic. Vintage keyboards (hammond, piano, wurlitzer, mellotron, pump organ), various types of guitars, sometimes accordion. Arrangements often incorporate additional string players or a brass section. The band has released four albums, receiving critical acclaim in the Netherlands and Belgium, before disbanding in december 2014.

== History ==
Houweling started off his music career in the early nineties signed to Columbia Records as Biscuit, releasing two singles. Disappointed in the workings of the Dutch music industry, he found ways to make the records he wants to make with Cloudmachine by using his song writing and composing skills working on other projects, investing the money he thus made in album productions. Songs were recorded for or by e.g. Kinderen voor Kinderen (reaching #21 in the Dutch Top 40), Tarja Turunen (The song My Little Phoenix on the album My Winter Storm that won awards in Finland (platinum), Russia (double platinum), Germany (gold) and the Czech Republic (gold) selling more than 500.000 copies), for Efteling, and Ricky Koole. He wrote and produced music for various national television series for Dutch public-service broadcasters such as VPRO, AVRO and Omroep NTR all part of Netherlands Public Broadcasting.

== Biography ==
Cloudmachine started out with Ruud Houweling (vocals & guitars), Richard Lagerweij (guitars), Michiel van Zundert (drums) and varying session musicians, releasing their debut album Sweater For The Cold World in 2003. Marco Kuypers joined as a member, prior to recording their second album Hum Of Life in 2006. Ray Edgar Duyns joined as a member while touring and promoting it. The third album Back On Land (2009) was partly recorded and fully mixed at the Prairie Sun Recording Studios in California by Oz Fritz, (award winning engineer on various Tom Waits albums such as Mule Variations). Mike Coolen replaced van Zundert, while touring and promoting Back On Land. Marco Kuypers and Mike Coolen are longtime friends, attending the Tilburg Conservatory together. At this point the band found its definite form. The video for the single Safe Haven, animated by Harrie Geelen was selected for the Holland Animation Film Festival 2009 and added to the collection of EYE Film Institute Netherlands. A fourth album titled A Gentle Sting was released in 2013. The band recorded with British producer Tristan Longworth who caught their attention with his work for Jon Allen. Allen sings backing vocals on the album and the mastering was done by mastering engineer Mike Marsh who is known for his work on classic albums by e.g. Björk, Prodigy, Depeche Mode, Oasis and Massive Attack. In 2014, A Gentle Sting won the award for Best Indie/Alternative Rock Album at the 13th Independent Music Awards. The band opened for international acts such as The Veils, Brett Anderson, Mew, The Boxer Rebellion and Tim Christensen.

== Discography ==
=== Studio albums ===
- Sweater For The Cold World (2003)
- Hum Of Life (2006)
- Back On Land (2009)
- A Gentle Sting (2013)

=== Singles ===
- Circus Animals(2003)
- Some Way (2004)
- When You Feel (2006)
- Make It Better (2006)
- Safe Haven (2009)
- Big Love (2009)
- Fading Picture (2010)
- Stone In The River (2012)
- Time Passes For Everyone (2013)
- Hands On Skin (2013)
