= Entropia (album) =

Studio album by Pain of Salvation
- Released: 21 August 1997
- Recorded: 1997
- Studio: Roasting House Recording Studio (Malmö, Sweden)
- Genre: Progressive metal
- Length: 70:42
- Label: Avalon (later InsideOutMusic)
- Producer: Anders "Theo" Theander

Pain of Salvation chronology
Entropia (1997)	One Hour by the Concrete Lake (1998)

Professional ratings
Review scores
Source	Rating
Allmusic	3/5 stars
Sputnikmusic	3.5/5 stars
Metal Storm	9/10 stars
Sea of Tranquility	5/5 stars

Entropia is Pain of Salvation's first studio album. It is a concept album concerning the story of a family in a fictional society that is torn apart by a war. The title is a portmanteau of Entropy (from thermodynamics), and Utopia (the ideal society). This is the only album to feature Daniel Magdic on guitar.

In 2024 and 2025, Loudwire elected it as one of the 11 best progressive metal debut albums and the 5th best progressive metal album of the 1990s, respectively.

== Release history ==
Entropia was first released by the Japanese company Marquee on their Avalon label in August 1997 (see 1997 in music). Following favourable reviews and positive fan reactions in the progressive rock/metal world, Marquee decided to fly Daniel over to Tokyo a week in October 1997 to promote the album. While in Tokyo, Daniel featured in various TV and radio shows, did interviews for the Japanese metal press, and performed in selected record stores. Around this time, purchasing albums through online record stores was commonplace, and fans from around the world began to do so with Entropia.

It was subsequently released in Romania (1998 on Rocris Discs), in Europe (September 1999 on InsideOut Music), in South America (September 1999 on Hellion), and in the USA (2000 on InsideOut America).

== Concept ==
"This album is a very complex concept that is pretty hard to grasp. It is about a family in a war situation, about a father that fails to protect his family, about a child who needs a father and not a soldier, about a society that kills and excludes and then takes its hand away from the remains in shock of what it has become. It is about a world I have chosen to call Entropia, which is a combination of the two words "Entropy" and "Utopia". Entropia is suspiciously similar to our world."

— Daniel Gildenlöw

== Track listing ==
All lyrics by Daniel Gildenlöw. All music by Daniel Gildenlöw except 1, 4 (part 2: "Memorials"), 6, 7 & 9 by Daniel Gildenlöw and Daniel Magdic.

Prologue
No.	Title	Length
1.	"!" (Foreword)	6:11

Chapter 1
No.	Title	Length
2.	"Welcome to Entropia"	1:22
3.	"Winning a War"	6:33
4.	"People Passing By"	9:07
5.	"Oblivion Ocean"	4:43

Chapter 2
No.	Title	Length
6.	"Stress"	5:01
7.	"Revival"	7:39
8.	"Void of Her"	1:46
9.	"To the End"	4:57

Chapter 3
No.	Title	Length
10.	"Circles"	0:55
11.	"Nightmist"	6:49
12.	"Plains of Dawn"	7:23

Epilogue
No.	Title	Length
13.	"Leaving Entropia" (Epilogue)	2:31

=== Additional information ===
- The Japanese version of "Entropia" has a bonus track after "To the End" titled "Never Learn to Fly".

== Personnel ==
- Daniel Gildenlöw - lead vocals, guitar
- Kristoffer Gildenlöw - bass, vocals
- Fredrik Hermansson - keyboards
- Johan Langell - drums, vocals
- Daniel Magdic - guitar, vocals

Additional personnel

- Ander "Theo" Theander - Producer, engineering
- Anders Hansson - Engineering
