= Scarsick =

Studio album by Pain of Salvation
- Released: 22 January 2007
- Genre: Progressive metal; nu metal
- Length: 67:52
- Label: InsideOut Music
- Producer: Pain of Salvation

Pain of Salvation chronology
BE (2004)	Scarsick (2007)	Ending Themes (On the Two Deaths of Pain of Salvation) (2009)

Professional ratings
Review scores
Source	Rating
About.com	3/5 stars
Blabbermouth.net	9.5/10 stars

Scarsick is the sixth studio album by Swedish progressive metal band Pain of Salvation, released on 22 January 2007. It is a concept album focusing on contemporary issues including capitalism, materialism, and consumerism. Scarsick is the last album to feature Johan Langell on drums.

== Overview ==
According to Daniel Gildenlöw, "Scarsick is much more band oriented and down to the core. Threatening and disturbing".

The liner notes reveal that Scarsick is actually The Perfect Element, part II - "he". The album is divided into two chapters: side A and side B.

== Concept ==
Scarsick is the second part of a planned, three-piece concept and the follow-up to The Perfect Element, part I. It continues the story of the male character from the latter album. Unlike its predecessor, Scarsick is a politically charged social commentary, and deals with a number of topics, including:

- Frustration (with society in general, and most of the things listed below)
- Consumer culture
- Materialism
- Industrialization
- Capitalism
- Commercialization
- American imperialism
- Conformity
- Idolization of celebrities
- Collectivist nature of religion
- Decline of civilization

Daniel Gildenlöw has revealed in interviews that the life of "He" is an allegory for all of mankind; that in him we see the problems of society on an intimate, personal level. Thus as The Perfect Element, part I deals with the subject of dysfunction in a psychological context that deals with the individual, Scarsick deals with them in a sociological sense and explores the relationship between the two. Just as the final song on the first part of the concept ("The Perfect Element") witnesses the falling of "He" on a mental level, the final song on Scarsick ("Enter Rain") sees him fall on a physical level.

== Track listing ==
Concept, music and lyrics by Daniel Gildenlöw.

Side A: His Skin Against This Dirty Floor
No.	Title	Length
1.	"Scarsick"	7:08
2.	"Spitfall" (Introducing Star/Thus Quote the Craving/Redefining Vomatorium/Man of the Masses/YO)	7:17
3.	"Cribcaged"	5:56
4.	"America"	5:05
5.	"Disco Queen" (Tonight I'll Fall/A Cheap Sellout Drug/A Tighter Groove/My Disco Queen)	8:22

Side B: Why Can't I Close My Eyes?
No.	Title	Length
6.	"Kingdom of Loss"	6:41
7.	"Mrs. Modern Mother Mary"	4:14
8.	"Idiocracy"	7:04
9.	"Flame to the Moth"	5:58
10.	"Enter Rain" (Running/Standing/Falling)	10:03

=== Scarsicker ===
The band offered an edited version of the album as a download from their official store in 2008. It also featured two new short tracks. Gildenlöw said on the release,

I had this idea about making edits where all of the songs would clock in under 5 minutes each. My absolute first idea was to make a radio edit version of the album, where every song would simply be cut at precisely 3:50 or something, except for the track America, in which we instead would add like 10 minutes of commercials after the "We'll be back after this short break!" phrase. But once I was sitting down with the tracks it became sort of a challenge. Some of the songs I prefer in the original version, but some (like Idiocracy and Mrs Modern Mother Mary for instance) really turned out more like I initially intended them to be, and I prefer them. Also, I could use my original idea for an intro to the album - it was scrapped for the official release since I felt it gave away the TPE1 link way too soon. The Slipsync track uses recurring themes, a trademark POS conceptual instrumental passage, and was originally thought as a Japanese bonus track, but then it felt more right on this edited album version, called SCARSICKER.

No.	Title	Length
1.	"Nausea"	0:25
2.	"Scarsick"	4:38
3.	"Spitfall"	4:56
4.	"Cribcaged"	4:26
5.	"America"	3:39
6.	"Disco Queen"	4:11
7.	"Kingdom of Loss"	6:41
8.	"Mrs. Modern Mother Mary"	3:52
9.	"Idiocracy"	4:52
10.	"Flame to the Moth"	4:55
11.	"Slipsync"	1:07
12.	"Enter Rain"	9:52

== Personnel ==
- Daniel Gildenlöw - lead vocals, guitars, bass guitar, banjos and samplers
- Johan Hallgren - guitars, vocals
- Fredrik Hermansson - keyboards, samplers
- Johan Langell - drums, backing vocals
