= One Hour by the Concrete Lake =

Studio album by Pain of Salvation
- Released: 21 July 1998
- Recorded: 1998
- Studio: Roasting House Recording Studio (Malmö, Sweden)
- Genre: Progressive metal
- Length: 59:55
- Label: Avalon (later InsideOutMusic)
- Producer: Pain of Salvation and Anders "Theo" Theander

Pain of Salvation chronology
Entropia (1997)	One Hour by the Concrete Lake (1998)	The Perfect Element, Part I (2000)

Professional ratings
Review scores
Source	Rating
Allmusic	3/5 stars
Sputnikmusic	5/5 stars
Silencio Hungary	4/5 stars
Lebmetal	5/5 stars

One Hour by the Concrete Lake is Pain of Salvation's second studio album. It is a concept album focusing on the issues of nuclear power and waste, displacement of indigenous peoples, the firearm industry, and human discovery.

== Release history ==
One Hour by the Concrete Lake was first released by Avalon Records in Japan in July 1998. It was later released in Europe in January 1999 on InsideOut, in the USA in November 1999 on InsideOut America and in South America in November 1999 on Hellion.

== Overview ==
One Hour by the Concrete Lake takes a more thorough and factual approach to its concept than its predecessor, Entropia. A number of facts are given in the album booklet, with a list of sources provided at the end. The chronological order of songs is the same as the track order (as opposed to Entropia) and a number of the events and places are real. For example, the Black Hills in North America and Lake Karachay in the former USSR. The sound is generally darker and more subdued than Entropia, with a harsh, industrial feel to the guitar tones.

Daniel Gildenlöw has personally, though reluctantly, stated that Concrete Lake is his least favorite Pain of Salvation album.

== Concept ==
One Hour by the Concrete Lake follows the fictional tale of a man that works in the weapons industry. He begins to have doubts about the morality of his occupation, and realizes that he is just part of a big "machine" that controls his life. He makes a New Year's resolution to discover what consequences his life and his work have on other parts of the world, and decides to break free of the machine.

In the second chapter, he travels around the world to many different places and sees what effects his weapons are actually having. He remembers being told that the weapons he helped to make would save human lives and preserve the peace, yet all he sees are weapons being used by people to kill other people—which is their designed purpose. Furthermore, he finds native people (specifically, Native American Indians) struggling to reclaim their sacred land from the colonizing white man, who have also taken uranium from the ground and dumped radioactive waste into the local rivers.

In the third chapter, he arrives at shores of Lake Karachay (in Kyshtym in the former USSR). There, so much nuclear waste had been dumped over the past fifty years that if one stood by the shore for one hour, the exposure to radiation would be such that death from physical injuries would inevitably occur within two weeks. Concrete blocks have been placed in the lake, falling to the bottom to help compress sediments down and prevent them from shifting. Still it would take tens of thousands of years for the deleterious effects of the radiation to subside. Unfortunately, after ten years, the concrete had already begun to crack and split open. The water in the lake has been decreasing steadily over the years and will eventually leave a dry lake bed. In addition, the lake connects to many underground rivers that go out to sea.

The man's quest to leave the machine ends as he realizes that it is impossible for anyone to truly leave the machine. Outside one machine there are merely more machines. However, he also realizes that the "machine" is only made of its "wheels," so the only thing he can do is choose which machine he wants to be part of and take some responsibility for its direction.

The album ends with the idea that anyone could easily come to understand the significance and immorality of the issues raised in the album; it would only require them to stand for one hour by the concrete lake.

== Track listing ==
All lyrics written by Daniel Gildenlöw. Music written by members listed below.

No.	Title	Writer(s)	Length
1.	"Spirit of the Land"	D. Gildenlöw	0:43

Part of the Machine
No.	Title	Writer(s)	Length
2.	"Inside"	D. Gildenlöw, Magdic, K. Gildenlöw, Hermansson	6:12
3.	"The Big Machine"	D. Gildenlöw, Magdic	4:21
4.	"New Year’s Eve"	D. Gildenlöw	5:43

Spirit of Man
No.	Title	Writer(s)	Length
5.	"Handful of Nothing"	D. Gildenlöw	5:39
6.	"Water"	D. Gildenlöw, Magdic	5:05
7.	"Home"	D. Gildenlöw	5:49

Karachay
No.	Title	Writer(s)	Length
8.	"Black Hills"	D. Gildenlöw	6:33
9.	"Pilgrim"	D. Gildenlöw	3:17
10.	"Shore Serenity"	D. Gildenlöw	3:13
11.	"Inside Out"	D. Gildenlöw, Magdic, Hermansson	13:20

Note: These are the reported track lengths on the CD casing, however, the length of Inside Out goes for over 6 more minutes (includes a hidden track, Pilgrim Reprise). This increases the track length to 13:15, and the total album playing time to 60:00, linking the album length to the album title. In the South American edition, the hidden tracks are removed to make space for a bonus track, "Beyond the Mirror". The Japanese edition of this album also contains "Beyond the Mirror" as well as another bonus track, "Timeweaver's Tale".

== Personnel ==
- Daniel Gildenlöw - lead vocals, guitar
- Kristoffer Gildenlöw - bass, vocals
- Johan Hallgren - guitar, vocals
- Fredrik Hermansson - keyboards and samplers
- Johan Langell - drums and percussion, vocals

Additional personnel

- Anders "Theo" Theander - producer, engineering
- Jonas Reingold - engineering
- Mats Olsson - mastering
- Frasse Franzen - photos
- Patrik Larsson/Peel Production - cover art
- Katarina Åhlén - cello

== Notes ==
- As commented by Daniel Gildenlöw in an interview in March 2001
