= Pain of Salvation =

Swedish progressive metal band

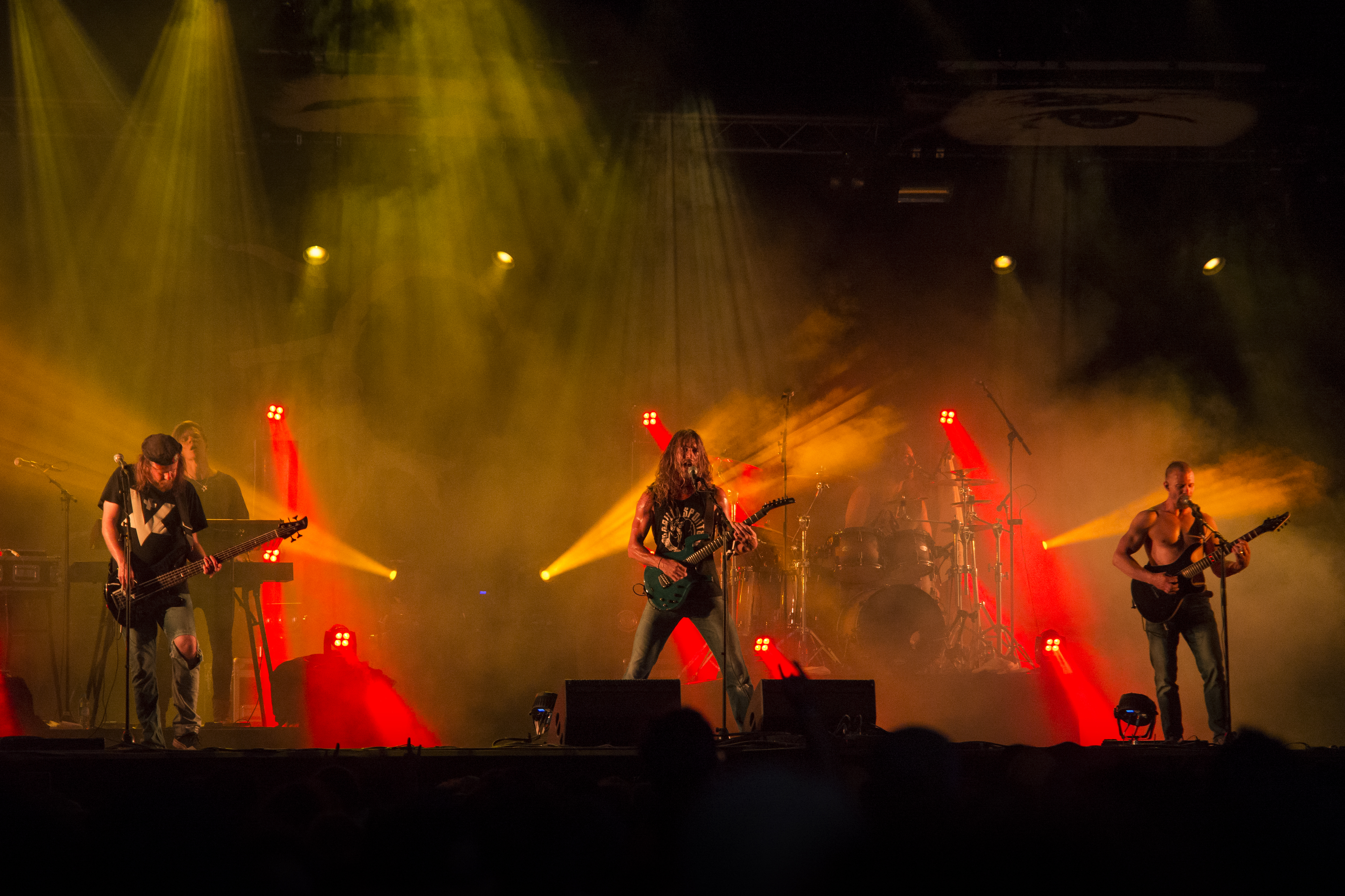
- Pain of Salvation live at Hellfest 2017

Background information
- Origin: Eskilstuna, Sweden
- Genres: Progressive metal, progressive rock
- Years active: 1984−1991 (as Reality); 1991−present (as Pain of Salvation)
- Label: InsideOut Music
- Members: Daniel Gildenlöw; Léo Margarit; Daniel Karlsson; Johan Hallgren
- Past members: Joakim Strandberg; Mikael Pettersson; Daniel Magdic; Johan Langell; Magnus Johansson; Kristoffer Gildenlöw; Fredrik Hermansson; Simon Andersson; Ragnar Zolberg; Gustaf Hielm
- Website: painofsalvation.com

Pain of Salvation is a Swedish progressive metal band led by Daniel Gildenlöw, who is the band's main songwriter, lyricist, guitarist, and vocalist. Pain of Salvation's sound is characterised by riff-oriented guitar work, a broad vocal range, oscillation between heavy and calm passages, complex vocal harmonies and the structures of their albums, syncopation, and polyrhythms. Thus far, every album released by the band has been a concept album. Lyrically, the band tends to address contemporary issues, such as sexuality, war, the environment, and the nature of God, humanity, and existence.

== Etymology ==
The name "Pain of Salvation" was devised by Daniel Gildenlöw, who interpreted the name as having "the meaning of balance. Taking the good with the bad. It is also a good expression in everyday use: when something does not go the way you planned, [the phrase 'pain of salvation'] indicates that this is just a slight setback on an otherwise painless journey towards your goal".

== Biography ==
=== Reality and early Pain of Salvation (1984–1996) ===
In 1984, an eleven-year-old Daniel Gildenlöw founded the band "Reality" in Eskilstuna, Sweden. One of the early members was Daniel Magdic, who would remain with the band until after Entropia was recorded in 1997. In 1987, Reality participated in the Swedish Annual Music Contest, "Rock-SM", and were the youngest competitors ever to enter the competition. Daniel Gildenlöw won the category of "Best Vocalist". In 1990, drummer Johan Langell and bassist Gustaf Hielm joined the band.

Daniel Gildenlöw renamed the band to "Pain of Salvation" in 1991, having reportedly conceived the band's name during math class. During the next three years, the band competed in contests and competitions while earning national recognition in the process.

In 1994, Kristoffer Gildenlöw, Daniel's younger brother, replaced Hielm on bass. The line-up of the Gildenlöw brothers, Magdic and Langell entered a local studio and recorded the Hereafter demo, which the band actively shopped to various record companies. Fredrik Hermansson learned of the band through the Hereafter demo and successfully auditioned to become the band's keyboardist.

=== Entropia and One Hour by the Concrete Lake (1997–1999) ===
In early 1997, Pain of Salvation entered the Roasting House Studio to record their debut album, Entropia, which was released in Asia on Avalon Records. Entropia was described as "a well-needed breath of fresh air for a genre that was full of self-parody and self-indulgence," as it was "delivered with emotion, intelligence, integrity, passion, and poignancy". A Sea of Tranquility reviewer also defined the album as Pain of Salvation's most "eclectic" release because of the varied song structures and arrangements. The album was also praised for sounding "crisp and fresh." In 1999, the album was released in Europe by InsideOut Music and in South America by Hellion Records.

Preparations for the band's second album were disrupted by the amicable departure of Magdic, who reportedly was unprepared to commit to the increasing demands associated with the band's initial success. Magdic was replaced by Johan Hallgren, who had previously played with Daniel Gildenlöw in Crypt of Kerberos. One Hour by the Concrete Lake was released in Asia on Avalon Records in July 1998. This album was considered a darker and more complex effort than Entropia, with one reviewer noting that "in a world that demands instant gratification, those things for which one must labor to reach usually give greater satisfaction in the end. That is certainly true with this CD". Another reviewer remarked that it was a more focused effort compared to its predecessor while also noting that it was a concept album which "contains several independent subtopics and, instead of directly telling a story, combines [interesting] lyrical themes in a very unusual and successful way." Some of the concepts explored are the impact of nuclear waste on the environment and life, in particular at Lake Karachay in the former USSR; indigenous peoples' rights, displacement, and beliefs; and war and firearms. Pain of Salvation signed with InsideOut Music and later American sibling, InsideOut Music America. The band embarked on a European tour supporting fellow progressive metal bands Threshold and Eldritch. They also played at their first ProgPower festival in Tilburg on 14 November 1999.

=== The Perfect Element, Part I and Remedy Lane (2000–2003) ===
After a short break to regroup, Pain of Salvation recorded their third album, The Perfect Element, Part I from March to July 2000. Conceptually, The Perfect Element, Part I examined an individual's formative events during the transition from adolescence to adulthood. Released in October 2000, the album was noted for being more straightforward and melodic than the two previous albums, yet retaining the complexity of arrangement and concept. Also, it was defined as "a landmark in the history of prog metal music. It is original, ground-breaking, fresh, and the definitive prog release of the new millennium." The reviewer stated that Perfect Element I marked the beginning of a completely new era for the band and praised the bold experimentation in the songwriting and conceptual development. In support of the album, the band toured Europe from September to October 2000 with Arena. In February 2001 the band headlined ProgPower USA alongside Symphony X and Evergrey.

In late 2001, Pain of Salvation recorded their fourth album, Remedy Lane, which was almost entirely written during a two-month period from August to September 2001 by Daniel Gildenlöw. The album, which was described as the band's "breakthrough", was recorded at Roasting House Studio in Sweden. Remedy Lane is Daniel Gildenlöw's semi-autobiographical meditation on love, lust, and life. The album was released in January 2002. During the Remedy Tour, Pain of Salvation opened for Dream Theater.

On 12 May 2003, Pain of Salvation recorded an acoustic concert in their hometown of Eskilstuna before a crowd of 80. The concert was released as 12:5 in early 2004. It featured dramatically rearranged versions of the band's past material. As a result, the band considers the album as a stand-alone work and not merely a live album.

=== BE and Scarsick (2004–2008) ===
For much of 2003 and 2004, the band worked on their most ambitious conceptual undertaking to date: a concept album about the nature of God and humanity, which Daniel Gildenlöw had been working on intermittently since 1996. The recording of the album was preceded by a number of live shows in Eskilstuna, where the band performed the album in its entirety. The shows were full productions replete with costumes, stage props, screen projections and the nine-part Orchestra of Eternity. After the conclusion of the string of performances, the material was further refined by Daniel Gildenlöw prior to commencing the recording in February 2004.

In September 2004, BE was released. The album proved divisive for critics and fans, with AllMusic remarking that "It may be safe to say that never in the history of rock & roll has an album creaked so alarmingly under the weight of such a ponderous concept". Sea of Tranquility commented that "[the album] BE too holds so many undiscovered treasures, and only after a good many spins will it disclose itself to its listeners." BE included a song featuring samples culled from a special phone line that the band set up for fans to record their messages on "God's answering machine". The messages were compiled and presented with a relaxed instrumental accompaniment, resulting in what the band considers to be one of their most touching tracks.

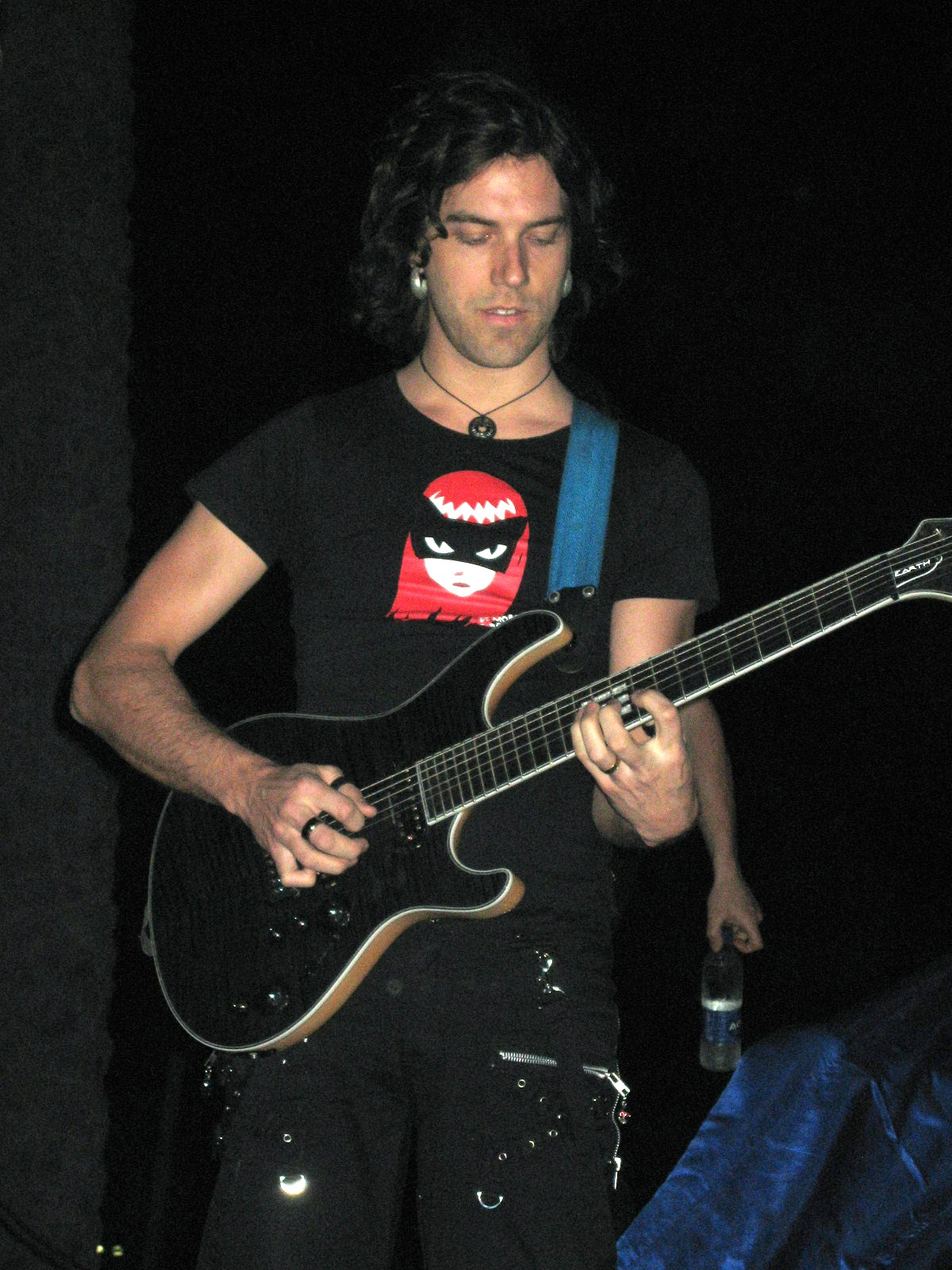
Daniel Gildenlöw performing in 2007

Pain of Salvation did not play in the United States from 2004 to 2013. In 2004, Daniel Gildenlöw expressed his refusal to take part in the U.S. policy of fingerprinting all out-of-country visitors, as well as his contempt for the Bush administration. On 22 January 2009, he announced his support for the newly elected Barack Obama and lifted his embargo on the country. On 21 February 2006, Kristoffer Gildenlöw, unable to attend rehearsals due to his relocation to the Netherlands, was asked to leave the band.

Scarsick was released on 22 January 2007. The album again met with mixed reviews. Daniel Gildenlöw said that Scarsick is a thematic continuation of The Perfect Element, Part I, drawing listeners' attention to the CD inlay where it reads: The Perfect Element, Part II - "He". Because of his brother's departure, Daniel Gildenlöw recorded the bass guitar parts for the album. The band toured Europe and played select international shows, including one in Egypt. Simon Andersson was recruited as touring bassist and, on 10 March 2007, he was made a full member of the band.

On 29 April 2007 the band announced that Johan Langell would depart at the end of the tour due to family commitments. On 6 October 2007, at the "Motstøy" festival in Notodden, the band announced that Langell's replacement would be Leo Margarit. Both drummers performed during the show, with Margarit doing a three-minute solo at the end of "Nightmist". Late in 2008, Simon Andersson left the band to pursue his side projects and recover from the Scarsick tour. The band relied on touring musicians Per Schelander (2008–2010) and Daniel Karlsson (2011) for the next three years.

On 13 February 2009, the band announced that they would take part in Dream Theater's "Progressive Nation 2009" tour. However, the recent bankruptcy of SPV forced both Pain of Salvation and Beardfish to back out of the tour because of a lack of financial backing.

The Ending Themes (On the Two Deaths of Pain of Salvation) DVD was released on 24 March 2009 and featured the band performing in Amsterdam performance. The DVD included a cover of the Leonard Cohen song, "Hallelujah".

=== Road Salt One and Two (2008–2013) ===
On 1 November 2008, the band debuted a new song, "Mortar Grind", from their upcoming studio album and EP. Pain of Salvation described its next project as a two album concept. However, the project was delayed due to the bankruptcy of SPV, subsidiary InsideOut Music was acquired by Century Media, which allowed the band to finish the albums. By the time that Daniel Gildenlöw returned to the album, he had re-evaluated the double album concept and ultimately decided to split the project into two separate releases.

In December 2009, it was confirmed that the song "Road Salt" would be an entry in the 2010 edition of Melodifestivalen, Sweden's national final for the 2010 Eurovision Song Contest. The band performed during the first semi-final and qualified for the runners-up broadcast; however, they lost to Pernilla Wahlgren by a slim margin and did not progress to the finals.

Road Salt One was released on 17 May 2010 in most of Europe and on 8 June 2010 in the North America while Road Salt Two was released in September 2011. A music video for "Where It Hurts" was also released. The Road Salt albums featured a concept that was in sharp contrast to previous undertakings, as Daniel Gildenlöw discusses:

it's not like a chronological story like the other albums. It's like several parallel stories and once you look at them together they start vibrating at the same speed or frequency and that's where you get the story...The whole idea is to compare situations or chains of events, compare them to roads and choose what roads you want to take and the roads will lead you to different places...whatever road you are traveling down at different points in the movie they will be keyframes. At that position, you could see things from a different perspective than you normally would. Many of these songs are these key frames and sort of singularities and special points on the different roads from all these different people doing the different things. That's where everything connects.

In late 2011 and early 2012, the band's lineup underwent significant turmoil, with Johan Hallgren and Fredrik Hermansson leaving at the end of the year, touring bassist Daniel Karlsson joining the band on keyboards, Gustaf Hielm returning on bass guitar, and Ragnar Zolberg joining on guitars.

=== Falling Home, In the Passing Light of Day and Panther (2014–present) ===
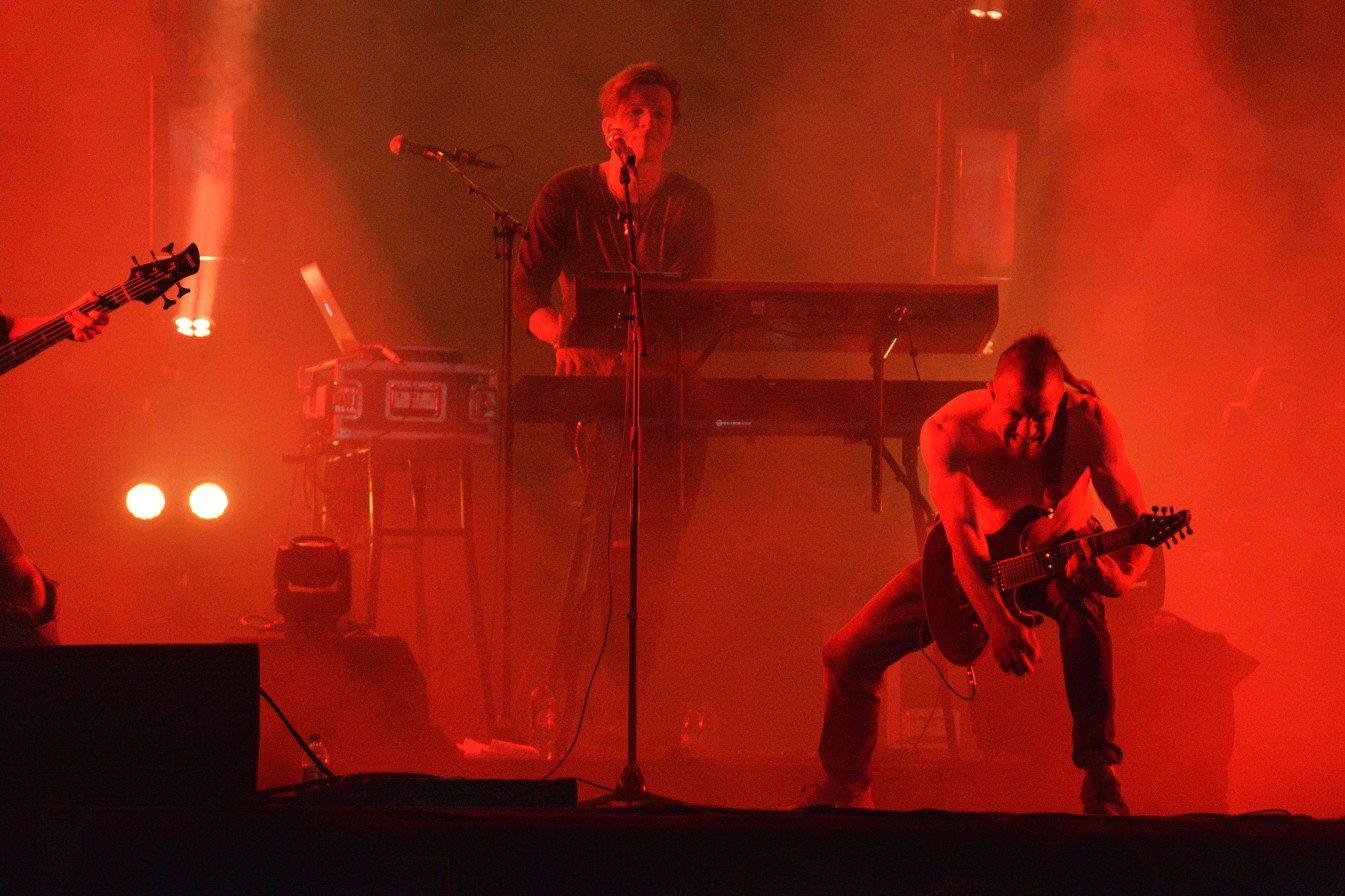
Pain of Salvation live at Hellfest 2017

In 2014, the band released Falling Home, an acoustic album containing re-imagined versions of their songs, two cover songs, and a brand new song (the title track, "Falling Home"). Around that time, Daniel Gildenlöw contracted a life-threatening flesh eating bacteria. Hospitalized in Uppsala, Sweden, he was forced to sit out of Transatlantic's KaLIVEoscope tour.

In 2016, the band released a remixed version of Remedy Lane, as well as Remedy Lane Re:lived, a live recording of the album played in its entirety from their appearance at ProgPower USA. During the same year, the band announced a new album, In the Passing Light of Day, based upon Gildenlöw's hospitalization with a life-threatening streptococcal infection. It was released on 13 January 2017. On 1 May 2017, the band announced the departure of Ragnar Zolberg from the band and the return of previous band member Johan Hallgren.

In 2020, the band announced the release of a new album, Panther, set for late August. A single from the album was released in advance titled "Accelerator". It was also the last album with longtime bassist Gustaf Hielm who had recently departed the band.

== Musical style ==
AllMusic describes Pain of Salvation's music as "melding metal, orchestral, and more traditional progressive elements".

== Band members ==
Current

Image	Name	Years active	Instruments	Release contributions
	Daniel Gildenlöw	1984−present	lead vocals; guitars; lute; mandolin; bass; keyboards; piano; sampling; drums; percussion	all releases
	Johan Hallgren	1997–2011; 2017–present	guitar; vocals	all releases from One Hour by the Concrete Lake (1998) to Road Salt Two (2011), from Panther (2020) onwards
	Léo Margarit	2007−present	drums; vocals; percussion	all releases from Linoleum (2009) onwards
	Daniel "D2" Karlsson	2011–present (touring 2011)	keyboards; percussion; bass (2011, 2020−present); backing vocals	Falling Home (2014); In the Passing Light of Day (2017)

Former

Image	Name	Years active	Instruments	Release contributions
	Joakim Strandberg	1984–1990	bass	none
	Mikael Pettersson	1984–1989	drums	none
	Daniel Magdic	1986−1997	guitar; backing vocals	Entropia (1997)
	Johan Langell	1989−2007	drums; percussion; backing vocals	all releases from Entropia (1997) to Ending Themes (On the Two Deaths of Pain of Salvation) (2009)
	Magnus Johansson	1990–1992	bass	none
	Gustaf Hielm	1992–1994; 2011–2020	bass; double bass; backing vocals	Road Salt One (2010); Falling Home (2014); In the Passing Light of Day (2017)
	Kristoffer Gildenlöw	1994−2006	bass; double bass; backing vocals	all releases from Entropia (1997) to BE (2004)
	Fredrik Hermansson	1996−2011	keyboards; backing vocals	all releases from Entropia (1997) to Road Salt Two (2011)
	Simon Andersson	2007–2008	bass; backing vocals	Ending Themes (On the Two Deaths of Pain of Salvation) (2009)
	Ragnar Zolberg	2011–2013; 2014–2017	guitar; vocals	Falling Home (2014); In the Passing Light of Day (2017)

Touring

Image	Name	Years active	Instruments	Release contributions
	Per Schelander	2008–2010; 2024–present	bass; backing vocals	Linoleum (2009)
	Roger Öjersson	2013	guitar; vocals	none
	Clay Withrow	2014	guitar; vocals	none
	Vikram Shankar	2022–present	keyboards; vocals	none

Timeline

== Discography ==
=== Studio albums ===
List of studio albums, with selected chart positions
Year	Album details	Peak chart positions			
Year	Album details	SWE	FIN	FRA	GR
1997	Entropia: Released: August 1997	—	—	—	—
1998	One Hour by the Concrete Lake: Released: July 1998	—	—	—	—
2000	The Perfect Element, Part I: Released: 31 October 2000	—	—	—	—
2002	Remedy Lane: Released: February 2002	—	—	—	—
2004	BE: Released: September 2004	—	—	—	—
2007	Scarsick: Released: 22 January 2007	6	—	155	3
2010	Road Salt One: Released: 2010	17	41	129	7
2011	Road Salt Two: Released: 2011	24	32	195	—
2014	Falling Home: Released: 2014	—	—	—	63
2017	In the Passing Light of Day: Released: 13 January 2017	—	32	—	—
2020	Panther: Released: 28 August 2020	—	—	—	—
"–" denotes releases that did not chart or were not released in that country.

=== EPs ===
- Linoleum (2009)

=== Live albums ===
- 12:5 (2004)
- "BE" (Original Stage Production) (2005)
- Ending Themes (On the Two Deaths of Pain of Salvation) (2009)
- Remedy Lane Re:lived (2016)

=== Singles ===
- "Ashes" (2000)
- "Road Salt" (2010)
- "Sisters" (2010)
- "Where It Hurts" (2011)
- "Accelerator" (2020)
- "Restless Boy" (2020)
- "Panther" (2020)

=== Demos ===
- Repent (1991–92)
- Unknowing (1993)
- Hereafter (1996)

=== Videography ===
- "BE" (Original Stage Production) (2005, live DVD)
- Ending Themes (On the Two Deaths of Pain of Salvation) (2009, live DVD)
