= Daniel Gildenlöw =

Swedish musician (born 1973)

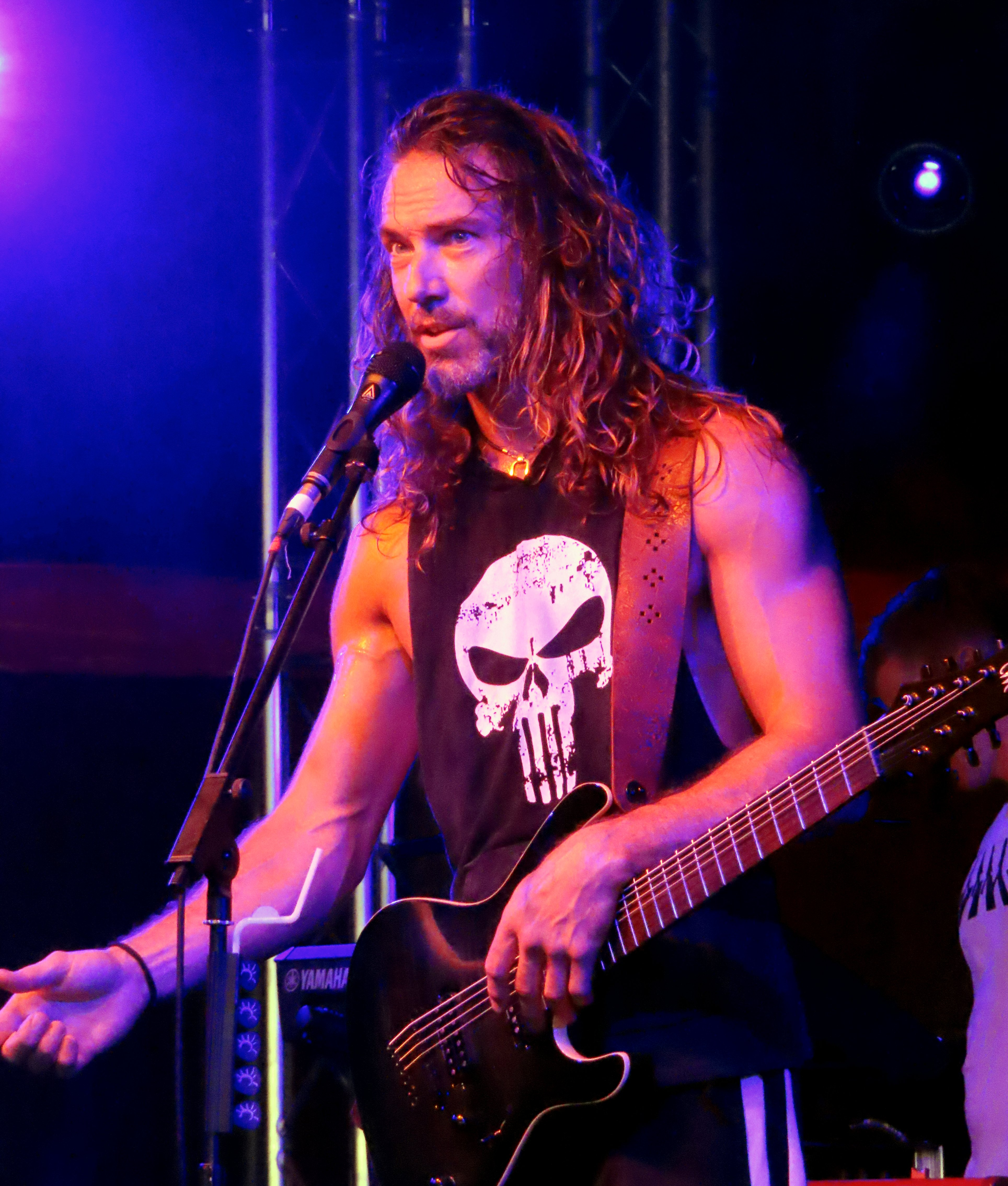
- Gildenlöw performing with Pain of Salvation in 2019

Background information
- Born: 5 June 1973 (age 53); Eskilstuna, Sweden
- Genres: Progressive metal; progressive rock; art rock; avant-garde metal
- Occupations: Musician; songwriter; producer; composer/arranger; music teacher
- Instruments: Vocals; guitar; bass; keyboards; piano; drums
- Years active: 1984–present
- Member of: Pain of Salvation, The Sea Within
- Formerly of: The Flower Kings

Daniel Gildenlöw (born 5 June 1973) is a Swedish musician and songwriter. He is best known as a multi-instrumentalist and vocalist for the progressive rock band Pain of Salvation. In the band, he is the main songwriter, lead singer, guitarist, producer, and the mastermind behind each album's concept. He has also performed with The Flower Kings, Transatlantic and The Sea Within.

== Career ==
In 1984, at age 11, Gildenlow formed a band called Reality, which changed its name to Pain of Salvation in 1991, and released its first album, Entropia, in 1997.

In 2001, he joined progressive rock supergroup Transatlantic on their European tour, playing keyboards, guitar and singing. He re-joined Transatlantic in 2010, this time for a North American tour.

In 2002, Gildenlow joined The Flower Kings on vocals, guitar, keyboards and percussion, playing on their albums Unfold the Future (2002), Meet the Flower Kings (2003) and Adam & Eve (2004). He departed The Flower Kings due to his opposition to US-VISIT which required submitting biometric data first before entering the U.S.

In 2007 he provided spoken word to the track "Repentance" on Dream Theater's album Systematic Chaos, alongside many other guests including Corey Taylor, Steve Vai, Joe Satriani, Mikael Åkerfeldt and Jon Anderson. In the same year he also sang on 01011001 by Ayreon.

He was also due to tour with Transatlantic again in 2014 but was forced to step down due to personal issues and was replaced by Ted Leonard. These personal issues were later revealed to be a flesh eating bacteria otherwise known as Necrotising Fasciitis which hospitalised him for six months. The events of which were fictionalised in Pain of Salvation's tenth album In the Passing Light of Day which was released in 2017.

In late 2017 he joined The Sea Within, a progressive rock supergroup consisting of guitarist Roine Stolt, bassist Jonas Reingold, drummer Marco Minnemann and keyboardist Tom Brislin. This band released one self titled album in 2018, which featured guests Jon Anderson (Yes), Jordan Rudess (Dream Theater), Casey McPherson (Flying Colors) and Rob Townsend (Steve Hackett).

== Personal life ==
Gildenlöw has been diagnosed with attention deficit hyperactivity disorder.

== Discography ==
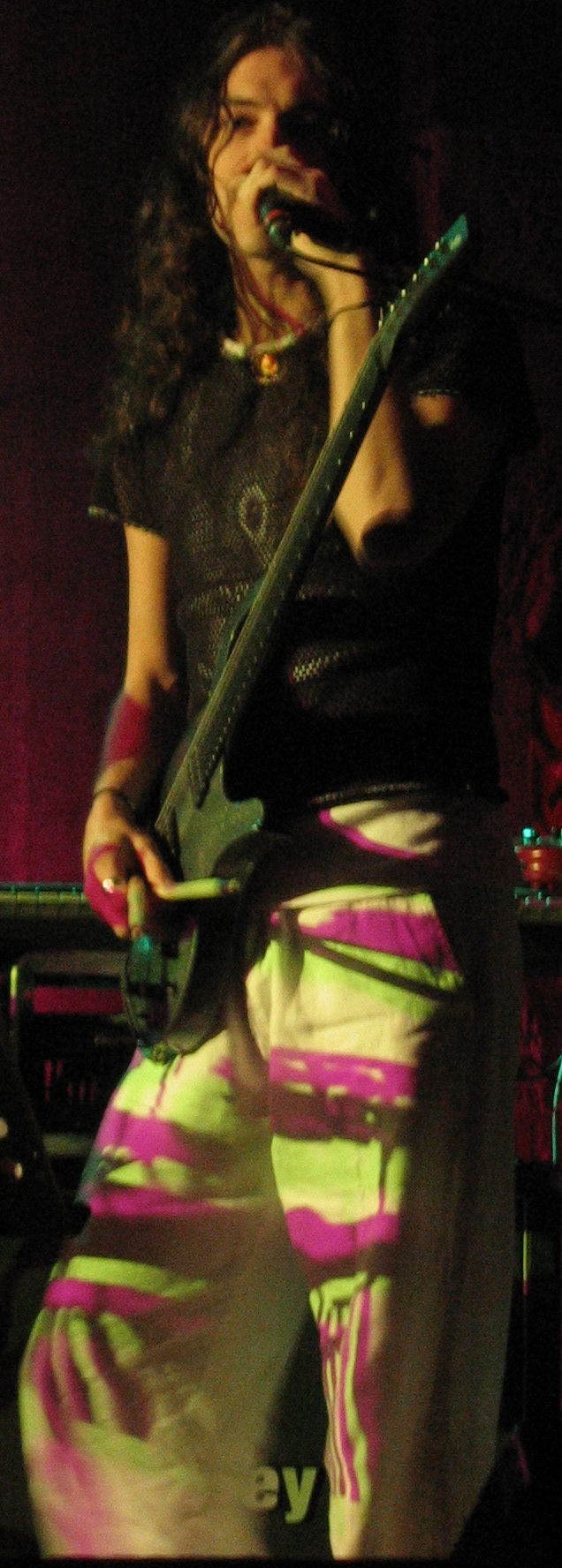
Gildenlöw performing in 2004

=== Pain of Salvation ===
- Hereafter (1996) (demo)
- Entropia (1997)
- One Hour by the Concrete Lake (1998)
- Ashes (2000) (single)
- The Perfect Element, Part I (2000)
- Remedy Lane (2002)
- 12:5 (2004)
- "BE" (2004)
- "BE" (Original Stage Production) (2005) (live DVD)
- "BE" (Original Stage Production) (2005) (live CD)
- Scarsick (2007)
- On the Two Deaths of Pain of Salvation (2009) (live CD)
- Ending Themes (2009) (live DVD)
- Linoleum EP (2009)
- Road Salt One (2010)
- Road Salt Two (2011)
- Falling Home (2014)
- In the Passing Light of Day (2017)
- Panther (2020)

=== Soviac ===
- GMC Out in the Fields (2002) (guitar on Don Chinos)

=== The Flower Kings ===
- Unfold the Future (2002) (lead and backing vocals)
- Meet the Flower Kings (2003) (live) (guitars, keyboards, vocals, percussion)
- Adam & Eve (2004) (lead and backing vocals)
- The Road Back Home (2007) (compilation) (vocals)

=== Crypt of Kerberos ===
- The Macrodex of War (2005) (compilation)

=== Daniele Liverani ===
- Genius: A Rock Opera – Episode 1: A Human into a Dream World (vocals), as Twinspirit n.32
- Genius: A Rock Opera – Episode 2: In Search of the Little Prince (2004) (vocals), as Twinspirit n.32
- Genius: A Rock Opera – Episode 3: The Final Surprise (2007) (vocals), as Twinspirit n.32

=== Axamenta ===
- Ever-Arch-I-Tech-Ture (2006) (vocals, vocal melodies/arrangements on the eighth track, "Threnody for an Endling")

=== Spastic Ink ===
- Ink Compatible, song titled "Melissa's Friend" (2004) (vocals)

=== Transatlantic ===
- Live in Europe (2003) (electric guitar, keyboard, percussion, vocals)
- Whirld Tour 2010: Live in London (2010) (keyboards, electric guitar, acoustic guitar, percussion, samples, vocals)
- Kaleidoscope (2014) (guest vocals on "Into the Blue")

=== Dream Theater ===
- Systematic Chaos (2007) (spoken word on the track Repentance)

=== Various artists ===
- ProgAID – All around the World (2005) (vocals)

=== Hammer of the Gods ===
- Two Nights in North America (2006) (vocals)

=== Ayreon ===
- 01011001 (2008) (vocals)
- 01011001 – Live Beneath the Waves (2024) (vocals)

=== Ephrat ===
- No One's Words (2008) (vocals on the track "The Sum of Damage Done")

=== For All We Know ===
- For All We Know (2011) (vocals on Keep Breathing)

=== Tristema ===
- Dove Tutto È Possibile (2012) (vocals on "L'Assenza (Roses and Thorns)")

=== The Sea Within ===
- The Sea Within (2018) (vocals, electric guitar)

=== Kingcrow ===
- The Persistence (2018) (vocals on "Night's Descending")
