= Arjen Lucassen discography =

Discography for Dutch musician Arjen Anthony Lucassen

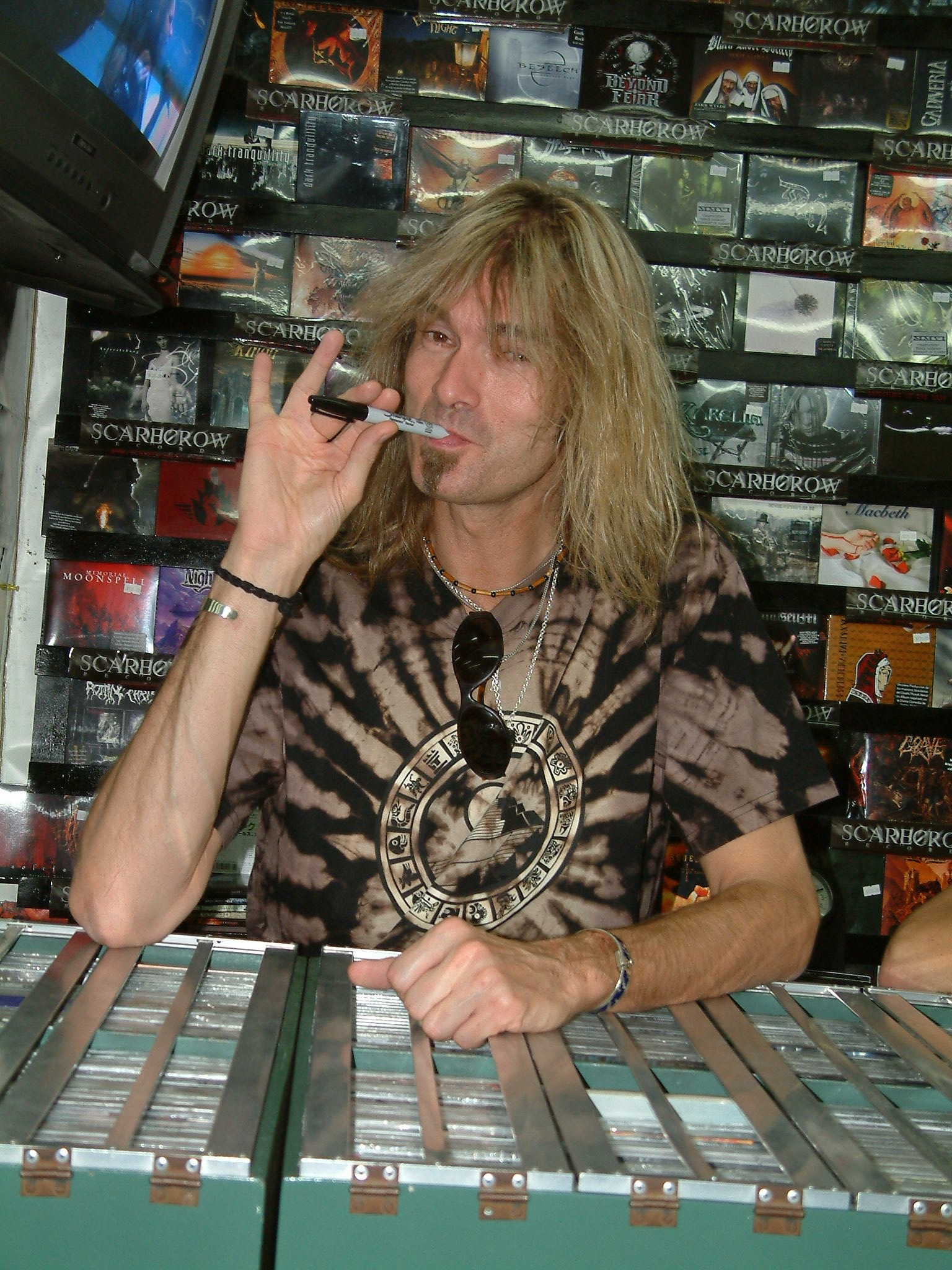
- Lucassen doing a sign session in 2006
- Studio albums: 26
- Extended plays: 4
- Live albums: 5
- Compilation albums: 2
- Singles: 19

Arjen Lucassen is a Dutch multi-instrumentalist musician, singer, songwriter and record producer. He is most known as the creator of progressive metal/rock opera Ayreon.

Over the years, Lucassen created various bands and musical projects. Overall, he has released twenty studio albums in project or bands in which he was the leader and main creative force: two solo albums, ten for Ayreon, one for Ambeon, three for Star One, one for Stream of Passion, one for Guilt Machine, one for The Gentle Storm, and one for Arjen Lucassen's Supersonic Revolution. He was the guitarist in two studio albums by rock band Bodine (as Iron Anthony), and in six studio albums by rock band Vengeance, and also released a cover album without any artist credited. Bodine, Vengeance, and Stream of Passion all released albums without Lucassen.

== Solo ==
=== Studio albums ===
Year	Album details	Instrument(s)	Notes
1994	Pools of Sorrow, Waves of Joy: Label: Ray's Music B.V	Lead vocals, guitars, banjo, mandolin, lute, keyboards, drum programming	Released as Anthony
2012	Lost in the New Real: Released: 23 April 2012; Label: Inside Out Music	Lead vocals, guitars, bass, keyboards	
2025	Songs No One Will Hear: Released: 12 September 2025; Label: Inside Out Music	Lead vocals, guitars, bass, keyboards	

=== Singles ===
Year	Title	Album
2012	Pink Beatles in a Purple Zeppelin: Label: Inside Out Music	Lost in the New Real

== Cover Albums ==
=== Studio albums ===
Year	Album details	Instrument(s)	Notes
1996	Strange Hobby Label: Transmission Records	Lead vocals, guitars, bass	Uncredited, recognized post-release

=== Singles ===
Year	Title	Album
1996	Pictures of Matchstick Men: Label: Transmission Records	Strange Hobby

== Ambeon ==
=== Studio albums ===
Year	Album details	Instrument(s)
2001	Fate of a Dreamer: Label: Transmission Records	Guitars, keyboards, samplers

=== Singles ===
Year	Title	Album
1998	"Cold Metal": Label: Transmission Records	Fate of a Dreamer

== Ayreon ==
=== Studio albums ===
Year	Album details	Instrument(s)	Notes
1995	The Final Experiment: Released: 27 October 1995; Label: Transmission Records	Vocals, guitars, bass, keyboards, synthesizer (also drums and timpani on 2005 reissue)	Originally released as Ayreon: The Final Experiment with no artist credited
1996	Actual Fantasy: Released: 23 October 1996; Label: Transmission Records	Guitars, bass, keyboards, drum programming	
1998	Into the Electric Castle: Released: 30 August 1998; Label: Transmission Records	Vocals, guitars, bass, keyboards, mandolin, minimoog, mellotron	
2000	Universal Migrator Part 1: The Dream Sequencer: Released: 20 June 2000; Label: Transmission Records	Vocals, guitars, bass, analog synthesizers, mellotron, Hammond, additional keyboards	Released simultaneously
2000	Universal Migrator Part 2: Flight of the Migrator: Released: 20 June 2000; Label: Transmission Records	Vocals, guitars, bass, analog synthesizers, mellotron, Hammond, additional keyboards	Released simultaneously
2004	The Human Equation: Released: 25 May 2004; Label: InsideOut Music	Vocals, guitars, bass, keyboards, mandolin, synthesizers, Hammond	
2008	01011001: Released: 25 January 2008; Label: InsideOut Music	Vocals, guitars, bass, keyboards, mandolin, synthesizers, Hammond, Solina	
2013	The Theory of Everything: Released: 28 October 2013; Label: InsideOut Music	Guitars, bass, mandolin, analog synthesizers, Hammond, Solina	
2017	The Source: Released: 28 April 2017; Label: Mascot Label Group	Guitars, bass, mandolin, analog synthesizers, Hammond, Solina	
2020	Transitus: Released: 25 September 2020; Label: Music Theories Recordings, Mascot Label Group	Guitars, Bass, Keyboards, Glockenspiel, Dulcimer, Toy Piano	

=== Live albums/DVDs ===
Year	Album details	Instrument(s)
2016	The Theater Equation: Released: 17 June 2016	Spoken vocals
2018	Ayreon Universe – The Best of Ayreon Live: Release: 30 March 2018	Vocals, guitar
2020	Electric Castle Live and Other Tales: Release: 27 March 2020	Vocals
2024	01011001 - Live Beneath the Waves: Release: 17 May 2024	Vocals

=== EPs ===
Year	Album details	Instrument(s)
2008	Elected: Released: 25 April 2008; Labels: Transmission Records/SPV	Guitars, bass, keyboards

=== Singles ===
Year	Title	Album
1995	"Sail Away to Avalon": Label: Transmission Records	The Final Experiment
1996	"The Stranger from Within": Label: Transmission Records	Actual Fantasy
2000	"Temple of the Cat": Label: Transmission Records	Universal Migrator Part 1: The Dream Sequencer
2001	"Temple of the Cat" (acoustic version): Label: Transmission Records	Universal Migrator Part 1: The Dream Sequencer
2004	"Day Eleven: Love": Label: InsideOut Music	The Human Equation
2004	"Loser": Label: InsideOut Music	The Human Equation
2005	"Come Back to Me": Label: InsideOut Music	The Human Equation

=== Compilation albums ===
Year	Album details
2000	Ayreonauts Only: Labels: Transmission Records
2008	Timeline: Labels: InsideOut Music

== The Gentle Storm ==
=== Studio albums ===
Year	Album details	Instrument(s)
2015	The Diary: Released: 2015; Labels: Inside Out Music	Electric and acoustic guitars, electric and acoustic bass guitars, keyboards, hammered dulcimer

=== EPs ===
Year	Album details	Instrument(s)
2015	The Gentle Storm Exclusive Tour CD: Released: 2015; Labels: Independent	Vocals, acoustic guitars, acoustic bass guitar, mandolin, percussion, hammered dulcimer

== Guilt Machine ==
=== Studio albums ===
Year	Album details	Instrument(s)
2009	On This Perfect Day: Released: 28 August 2009; Labels: Mascot Records	Guitars, bass, keyboards, mandolin, backing vocals

== Plan Nine ==
=== Studio albums ===
Year	Album details
2023	The Long-Lost Songs: Released: 17 May 2024; Labels: Music Theories Recordings

== Simone Simons ==
=== Studio albums ===
Year	Album details	Instrument(s)
2024	Vermillion: Released: 23 August 2024; Labels: Nuclear Blast	All music and instruments

== Star One ==
=== Studio albums ===
Year	Album details	Instrument(s)
2002	Space Metal: Released: 21 May 2002; Labels: InsideOut Music	Guitars, keyboards, Hammond
2010	Victims of the Modern Age: Released: 25 October 2010; Labels:InsideOut Music	Guitars, Hammond, mellotron, analog synthesizer, solina strings
2022	Revel in Time: Released: 18 February 2022; Labels: InsideOut Music	Vocals, guitars, bass, keyboards

=== Live albums/DVDs ===
Year	Album details	Instrument(s)
2002	Live on Earth: Released: 29 April 2003; Labels: InsideOut Music	Guitar

== Stream of Passion ==
=== Studio albums ===
Year	Album details	Instrument(s)
2005	Embrace the Storm: Released: 24 October 2005; Labels: InsideOut Music	Guitars, keyboards

=== Live albums/DVDs ===
Year	Album details	Instrument(s)
2006	Live in the Real World: Released: 15 June 2006; Labels: InsideOut Music	Guitars, vocals

=== Singles ===
Year	Title	Album
2006	"Out in the Real World": Released: 27 February 2006; Label: Transmission Records	Embrace the Storm

== Supersonic Revolution ==
=== Studio albums ===
Year	Album details	Instrument(s)
2023	Golden Age of Music: Released: 19 May 2023; Labels: Music Theories Recordings	Bass

== With Bodine ==
=== Studio albums ===
Year	Album details	Instrument(s)	Notes
1982	Bold as Brass: Labels: Warner Music Group	Guitar	Credited as Iron Anthony
1983	Three Times Running: Labels: Warner Music Group	Guitar	Credited as Iron Anthony

== With Vengeance ==
=== Studio albums ===
Year	Album details	Instrument(s)	Notes
1984	Vengeance	Guitar	
1986	We Have Ways to Make You Rock	Guitar	
1987	Take It or Leave It	Guitar	
1989	Arabia	Guitar	
1994	The Last of the Fallen Heroes	Guitar	Released after the band split
1997	Back from Flight 19	Guitar	Not credited as band member

=== EPs ===
Year	Album details	Instrument(s)
1986	Only the Wind	Guitar
1987	Rock N Roll Shower	Guitar
1989	If Lovin' You is Wrong	Guitar

=== Singles ===
Year	Title	Album
1984	"Prisoners of the Night"	Vengeace
1985	"You Took me by Surprise"	Vengeace
1986	"May Heaven Strike me Down"	We Have Ways to Make You Rock
1986	"Only the Wind"/"Deathride to Glory"	Only the Wind
1987	"Rock N roll Shower"/"Code of Honour"	Rock N Roll Shower
1987	"Looks like a Winner"	Take It or Leave It
1987	"Ain't Gonna Take You Home"	Take It or Leave It
1989	"Arabia"	Arabia
1992	"As The Last Teardrop Falls"	Arabia

=== Compilation albums ===
Year	Album details	Instrument(s)	Notes
1992	The Last Teardrop '84–'92	Guitar	
1998	Rock'n Roll Shower '84–'98	Guitar	Released after his departure

== Guest appearances ==
Year	Album	Artist
1981	After the Silence	Pythagoras
1993	Symphony of Dreams	Ian Parry
1994	Pink Floyd Songbook	Alex Bollard
1995	Thru the Looking Glass	Ian Parry
1996	Between You and Me	Biscuit
1997	Opposites	Veralin
1998	A Time and Place for Everything	Helloise
1999	Powder to the People	BlockBusters
1999	Consortium Project	Ian Parry
1999	Candy: The Best of Peter Daltrey	Peter Daltrey
1999	Oblivion Days	Rocket Scientists
2000	Into the Sunset	Erik Norlander
2000	Shadowman	Ian Parry
2000	Chronometree	Glass Hammer
2000	Mother Earth	Within Temptation
2000	Secrets of Astrology	Lana Lane
2002	"Emphasis/Who Wants to Live Forever"	After Forever
2002	The Hound of the Baskervilles	Clive Nolan and Oliver Wakeman
2002	Reflected	Wicked Sensation
2003	Alive Again	Nightingale
2003	Biogenesis Project	Ars Nova
2003	Once and Future King Part I	Gary Hughes
2004	The Darker Side of Art	Space Mirrors
2004	Amadeus' Spell	
2005	Hour of Joy	Morning
2005	This Sonic Landscape	Elfonía
2005	Characters	Freak Neil Inc.
2005	Room V	Shadow Gallery
2008	Cybion	Kalisia
2008	Galexia	Galexia
2013	The Mystery of Time	Avantasia
2013	Abstract Disorder	Homo-Demen
2014	The Aspie Project	Computer Mind
2015	Death is just a Feeling	Amadeus Awad
2016	The Clockwork Fable	Gandalf's Fist
2017	Galexia Remastered	Galexia
2017	Rose of Thorns 2.0	Galexia
2017	Of Clans and Clones and Clowns	Soul Enema
2018	The Room	Ostura
2024	"A Symphonic Tragedy"	Dianne van Giersbergen

== Contributing artist / Guest appearances ==
Year	Artist	Album	Notes
1981	Pythagoras	After the Silence	Guitar / Bass Pedals: Guitar (Tracks 2-4, 8-12), Bass Pedals Track 12
1993	Ian Parry	Symphony of Dreams	Guitar: Lead Guitar on "Watch the Wind Blow"
1994	Alex Bollard	Pink Floyd Songbook	Vocals: Melody Vocals on "Burning Bridges"
1995	Ian Parry	Thru the Looking Glass	Guitar: Guest Guitar on "Tell Me Why"
1996	Biscuit	Between You and Me	Guitar / Bass: Acoustic Guitar on "Between You And Me", Bass on "Anybody Out There?"
1997	Vengeance	Back From Flight 19	Guitar / Vocals / Writing / Production: Guitar solo on "Flight 19", Backing vocals across the album
1997	Vengeance	Planet Zilch	All Instruments: On "Big Fat Car" and "What The Hell Is Going On". The other 2 tracks are same as on the Album
1998	Helloise	A Time and Place for Everything	Guitar:Lead Guitar on "After The War"
1999	Block Busters	Powder to the People	Guitar / Vocals: Jean Genie
1999	Ian Parry	Consortium Project	Bass / Engineer: "Change Breeds Contempt", "A Miracle is All We Need", "The Snake"
1999	Peter Daltrey	Candy: The Best of Peter Daltrey	Guitar: Guest Guitar on "Candy"
1999	Rocket Scientists	Oblivion Days	Guitar: Lead on "Escape", Rhythm on "Aqua Vitae", "Oblivion Days", "Space 1999", "Escape"
2000	Erik Norlander	Into the Sunset	Guitar: All tracks (EU/USA and JPN release have different Bonus Tracks, both of which feature Arjen)
2000	Ian Parry	Shadowman	Guitar: Lead on "Watch the Wind Blow" from 'Symphony of Dreams', "Tell Me Why" from 'Thru The Looking Glass'
2000	Glass Hammer	Chronometree	Guitar: Lead solo on "Perfect Indigo"
2000	Within Temptation	Mother Earth	Guitar: Solo on "Dark Wings"
2000	Lana Lane	Secrets of Astrology	Guitar / Bass: All Guitars on "Tarot"
2002	After Forever	Emphasis/Who Wants to Live Forever]"	Guitar / Keyboard: "Who Wants to Live Forever"
2002	Clive Nolan and Oliver Wakeman	The Hound of the Baskervilles	Guitar: "Guitar on "Shadows of Fate", "Second Light", "Seldon", "Waiting"
2002	Wicked Sensation	Reflected	Vocals: 'Backing' Vocals across several tracks
2003	Nightingale	Alive Again	Guitar: Second Solo on "Falling"
2003	Ars Nova	Biogenesis Project	Guitar: Electric Guitar on "Biogenesis - Melt Down", "Escape", "Trust to The Future"
2003	Gary Hughes	Once and Future King Part I	Keyboard: "Excalibur"
2004	Space Mirrors	The Darker Side of Art	Guitar / Narration: All Guitars and Narration on "Dark Jedi", Lead Vocal and Rhythm Guitar on "It's Cold Today in Underworld"
2005	Elfonía	This Sonic Landscape	Guitar: Solo on "Camaleon"
2005	Freak Neil Inc.	Characters	Vocal: Lead / Backing Vocals on "I Understand"
2005	'Hurricane Katrina Project'	After The Storm	Pools of Sorrow / Not Over You
2005	Morning	Hour Of Joy	Narrator: Spoken Word Narration on intro.(58 sec
2005	Progaid	All Around The World	Guitar: Guest Guitar, stand out version on "All Around The World (Cue Mix).
2005	Shadow Gallery	Room V	Guitar / Vocal: Lead Solo / Lead/Co-Lead Vocals on "Floydian Memories", Lead Solo on "Seven Years"
2006	Shakary	Shakary 2006	Guitar: Guest Solo on "Sentence"
2006	Vengence	Back In The Ring	Guitar: Lead solo on "Captain Moonlight"
2007	Galexia	Galexia (Remastered)	Vocals: Vocals on "Rose Of Thorns"
2008	Kalisia	Cybion	Vocals: Guest Vocals on "Beyond Betrayal"
2013	Avantasia	The Mystery of Time	Guitar: Solo on "The Watchmakers Dream"
2014	Computer Mind	The Aspie Project	Narrator: As "The Doctor"
2015	Amadeus Awad	Death is just a Feeling	Vocals: Spoken Word and Lead Vocals on "Temporary"
2016	Gandalf's Fist	The Clockwork Fable	Vocals: Choir, and Sung words for 'Armistead'
2016	Mantra Vega	The Illusion's Reckoning	Guitar: Guest Solo on "The Illusion's Reckoning"
2017	Galexia	Rose Of Thorns 2.0 (Remastered)	Vocals: Vocals on "Rose Of Thorns"
2017	Soul Enema	Of Clans and Clones and Clowns	Guitar: Guest Solo on "Eternal Child"
	Epica Vs Metropole Orkest	Beyond The Matrix - The Battle	Guitar: Guest Solo
2018	Ostura	The Room	Guitar: Guest Solo on "Darker Shade of Black"
2023	Temperance	Hermitage - Daruma's Eyes Pt. 2	Narrator: Multiple Tracks
2023	Edward Reekers	The Liberty Project	Guitar / Bass: "The Disease"
2024	Dianne van Giersbergen	A Symphonic Tragedy	Guitar: Solo
2025	Flaming Row	The Keeper Of The Scriptures	Guitar: Guest Solo on "An Old Legend"
2025	Simone Simmons	Vermillion	All Instruments / Music / Production
