= Electric Castle Live and Other Tales =

Live album by Ayreon
- Released: 27 March 2020
- Recorded: 13–15 September 2019
- Genre: Progressive metal, progressive rock
- Length: 2:26:39
- Label: Mascot Label Group / Music Theories
- Producer: Arjen Anthony Lucassen

Ayreon live chronology
Ayreon Universe – The Best of Ayreon Live (2018)	Electric Castle Live and Other Tales (2020)	01011001 – Live Beneath the Waves (2024)

Electric Castle Live and Other Tales is a live album and DVD/Blu-ray by Arjen Anthony Lucassen's progressive rock/metal rock opera project Ayreon, released on 27 March 2020. It is a live version of the 1998 studio album Into the Electric Castle, performed as an actual rock opera, complete with mise-en-scène; it is a recording of one of four live performances between 13 and 15 September 2019 in Tilburg to celebrate the original album's 20th anniversary in a way similar to The Theater Equation, with songs from other Lucassen projects performed once the songs from the albums were all performed.

Lucassen and fellow singers Anneke van Giersbergen, Damian Wilson, Edward Reekers (in his final performance and overall album with Ayreon before his death in 2025), Edwin Balogh, Fish, and George Oosthoek returned to reprise their roles from the original album, alongside drummer Ed Warby and flutist Thijs van Leer. New additions include John "Jaycee" Cuijpers of Praying Mantis, Simone Simons of Epica, Marcela Bovio of Mayan, and Mark Jansen of both Epica and Mayan, with actor John de Lancie acting as narrator. The performance of the album was followed by a selection of songs from other Lucassen projects.

== Background and recording ==
After positive reactions to the Ayreon Universe shows, Lucassen decided to supervise a live version of Into the Electric Castle in a style similar to The Theater Equation, to celebrate the album's 20th anniversary.

The four Electric Castle Live and Other Tales shows were performed between 13 and 15 September 2019 (with two performances on the last day) in Tilburg; unlike The Theater Equation, which was performed as an unofficial series of shows titled Ayreon's The Human Equation Theater Experience with the recording being later released as an official Ayreon release, Electric Castle Live and Other Tales was performed as a series of official Ayreon shows. Singers Anneke van Giersbergen, Damian Wilson, Edward Reekers, Edwin Balogh, Fish, and George Oosthoek returned to reprise their roles from the original album, alongside drummer Ed Warby and flutist Thijs van Leer; Lucassen also reprised his role as the Hippie, unlike in The Theater Equation, in which he had been replaced by Jermain "Wudstik" van der Bog and only made a small appearance at the end. New additions include John "Jaycee" Cuijpers of Praying Mantis, Simone Simons of Epica, Marcela Bovio of Mayan, and Mark Jansen of both Epica and Mayan, with actor John de Lancie acting as narrator. Actor John de Lancie, of whom Lucassen was a long-time fan due to De Lancie's role as Q in Star Trek: The Next Generation, was announced on 8 October 2018 as the playing the role of "The Voice" in the last performances, replacing Peter Daltrey from the original album.

After performing the album in its entirety, the cast performed several songs from other Lucassen projects: "Shores of India" from the album The Diary by his band The Gentle Storm with Van Giersbergen, "Ashes" from the album Fate of a Dreamer by his former project Ambeon, "Out in the Real World" from Embrace the Storm by his former band Stream of Passion with Bovio and her ex-husband Johan van Stratum (who performs bass on the live album), "Pink Beatles in a Purple Zeppelin" from his solo album Lost in the New Real, and "Songs of the Ocean" from Space Metal by his project Star One with Wilson; they also performed a cover of Kayleigh", a song by Marillion from Fish's time with the band.

== Release ==
The album was available to pre-order in five editions: the Super Deluxe Wooden Box Set for €159,00, limited to 1500 copies worldwide, the 5-disc Earbook for €49,99, the Gold Vinyl Edition for €27,99, the 2CD + DVD edition for €17,99, and the Blu-Ray for €17,99. The Gold Vinyl Edition does not contain the tracks "Robby Valentine (piano solo)", "Kayleigh", and "Speech by Arjen & Joost".

It also features a documentary chronicling the making of the shows and the events behind-the-scenes of the show themselves.

== Track listing ==
All tracks are written by Arjen Anthony Lucassen, except as noted. Narration written by John de Lancie and Marnie Mosiman

No.	Title	Length
1.	"Welcome to the New Dimension"	3:10
2.	"Isis and Osiris" (Lucassen/Fish)	10:51
3.	"Amazing Flight" (Lucassen/Jay van Feggelen)	8:26
4.	"Time Beyond Time"	6:30
5.	"The Decision Tree" (Lucassen/Fish)	5:44
6.	"Tunnel of Light" (Lucassen/Fish/Anneke van Giersbergen)	4:29
7.	"Across the Rainbow Bridge"	6:05
8.	"The Garden of Emotions"	9:00
9.	"Valley of the Queens"	4:18
10.	"The Castle Hall"	5:45
11.	"Tower of Hope"	5:32
12.	"Cosmic Fusion"	6:53
13.	"Robby Valentine"	4:52
14.	"The Mirror Maze"	6:52
15.	"Evil Devolution"	5:00
16.	"The Two Gates"	6:54
17.	"Forever of the Stars"	1:39
18.	"Another Time, Another Space" (Lucassen/Fish)	6:18
19.	"Shores of India" (Lucassen/A. van Giersbergen)	5:23
20.	"Ashes" (Lucassen/Astrid van der Veen)	5:06
21.	"Out in the Real World" (Lucassen/Marcela Bovio)	4:01
22.	"Twisted Coil" (Lucassen/Lori Linstruth)	9:18
23.	"Kayleigh" (Fish/Marillion)	4:14
24.	"Pink Beatles in a Purple Zeppelin"	4:36
25.	"Songs of the Ocean"	5:43

== Personnel ==
Vocalists

- John de Lancie – Narrator
- Fish (ex-Marillion) – Highlander
- Simone Simons (Epica) – Indian
- Damian Wilson (Headspace, Maiden uniteD, ex-Threshold) – Knight
- Edwin Balogh – Roman
- Anneke van Giersbergen (The Gentle Storm, VUUR, ex-The Gathering) – Egyptian
- John Jaycee Cuijpers – Barbarian
- Arjen Anthony Lucassen – Hippie
- Edward Reekers (ex-Kayak) – Futureman
- George Oosthoek (ex-Orphanage) – Death
- Mark Jansen (Epica, Mayan, ex-After Forever) - Death
- Marcela Bovio (Stream of Passion, Mayan) - Backing vocals, lead vocals on "Out in the Real World"
- Dianne van Giersbergen (Ex Libris, ex-Xandria) - Backing vocals
- Jan Willem Ketelaers - Backing vocals
- Robert Soeterboek - Vocals on "Songs of the Ocean"
- Michael Mills (Toehider) - TH-1 (recorded intro to Other Tales section)
- Rutger Hauer - Voight Kampff (recorded intro to "Pink Beatles in a Purple Zeppelin")

Production

- Arjen Anthony Lucassen – producing, mixing
- Brett Caldas-Lima – mastering

Instrumentalists

- Ed Warby – drums
- Marcel Singor (Kayak) – lead guitar
- Ferry Duijsens (VUUR, Dear Mother) – guitar
- Bob Wijtsma (Ex Libris) – guitar
- Johan van Stratum (VUUR, Stream of Passion) – bass
- Joost van den Broek (ex-After Forever) – keyboards
- Ben Mathot – violin
- Jurriaan Westerveld – cello
- Thijs van Leer (Focus) – flute
- Robby Valentine - piano on "Robby Valentine" and "The Mirror Maze"
- Arjen Anthony Lucassen - guitar on "Songs of the Ocean"

== Charts ==
Chart (2020)	Peak position
German Albums (Offizielle Top 100)	14
Hungarian Albums (MAHASZ)	13
