= Ayreon Universe – The Best of Ayreon Live =

Ayreon Universe – Best of Ayreon Live

Live album by Ayreon
- Released: 30 March 2018
- Recorded: 15–16 September 2017
- Genre: Progressive metal, progressive rock
- Length: 122:38
- Label: Mascot Label Group / Music Theories
- Producer: Arjen Anthony Lucassen

Arjen Anthony Lucassen live chronology
The Theater Equation (2016)	Ayreon Universe – Best of Ayreon Live (2018)	Electric Castle Live and Other Tales (2020)

Arjen Anthony Lucassen chronology
The Source (2017)	Ayreon Universe – Best of Ayreon Live (2018)	Electric Castle Live and Other Tales (2020)

Ayreon Universe – The Best of Ayreon Live, alternatively known as Ayreon Universe – Best of Ayreon Live or simply Ayreon Universe, is a live album and DVD/Blu-ray by Arjen Anthony Lucassen's progressive rock/metal rock opera project Ayreon, released on 30 March 2018. Unlike Ayreon's first live album The Theater Equation, which was a stage performance of the album The Human Equation, Ayreon Universe was performed as a traditional concert, with two additional songs from Star One, another project by Lucassen. It was recorded during a series of concerts in September 2017, which were the first ever official Ayreon concerts, although The Theater Equation was released (but not performed) as an official Ayreon product.

The performance featured 16 singers, all of whom had previously worked together with Lucassen on his studio albums.

== Recording ==
It was recorded during a series of concerts in September 2017, which were the first ever official Ayreon concerts; over 9000 fans were present in the attendance, with 30 cameras used for the filming.

=== Promotion ===
Lucassen officially announced the album in January 2018.

On 30 January 2018 Lucassen released the video for "Everybody Dies" on YouTube to promote the upcoming release, calling the track "a personal favorite".

=== Release ===
The album was released on seven different formats: single-disc Blu-ray, 2 DVDs, 2 CDs, 3 black LPs, a 3 gold LPs edition limited to 500 copies, a digital download version, and a "Limited Edition" featuring the contents from all first three editions.

== Track listing ==
All tracks are written by Arjen Anthony Lucassen except where noted.

No.	Title	Lead vocalists^{1}	Length
1.	"Prologue" (from The Final Experiment)	Michael Mills	3:57
2.	"Dreamtime" (from The Final Experiment)	Edward Reekers	2:31
3.	"Abbey of Synn" (from Actual Fantasy)	Robert Soeterboek	4:16
4.	"River of Time" (from 01011001)	Hansi Kürsch, Marco Hietala	3:58
5.	"The Blackboard" (from The Theory of Everything; lyrics by Lucassen and Lori Linstruth)	Mills, Marcela Bovio	1:52
6.	"The Theory of Everything" (from The Theory of Everything; lyrics by Lucassen and Linstruth)	Mills, Bovio	4:38
7.	"Merlin's Will" (from The Final Experiment)	Floor Jansen	3:10
8.	"Waking Dreams" (from 01011001; music by Lucassen and Anneke van Giersbergen)	Jonas Renkse, Anneke van Giersbergen	3:40
9.	"Dawn of a Million Souls" (from Universal Migrator Part 2: Flight of the Migrator)	John Jaycee Cuijpers	5:08
10.	"Valley of the Queens" (from Into the Electric Castle)	Van Giersbergen, F. Jansen, Bovio	2:50
11.	"Ride the Comet" (from 01011001)	Renkse, Maggy Luyten	3:41
12.	"Star of Sirrah" (from The Source)	Mills, Luyten, Kürsch, F. Jansen	5:56
13.	"Comatose" (from 01011001)	Van Giersbergen, Renkse	2:58
14.	"Day Sixteen: Loser" (from The Human Equation; lyrics by Lucassen and Devin Townsend)	Mills	4:42
15.	"And the Druids Turned to Stone" (from Universal Migrator Part 1: The Dream Sequencer)	Damian Wilson	4:42
16.	"The Two Gates" (from Into the Electric Castle)	Cuijpers, Wilson; spoken vocals by Irene Jansen	6:00
17.	"Into the Black Hole" (from Universal Migrator Part 2: Flight of the Migrator)	Tommy Karevik	6:11
18.	"Actual Fantasy" (from Actual Fantasy)	Reekers	1:25
19.	"Computer Eyes" (from Actual Fantasy)	Reekers, Soeterboek	4:35
20.	"Magnetism" (from The Theory of Everything; lyrics by Lucassen and Linstruth)	Karevik, Van Giersbergen, Hietala	4:45
21.	"Age of Shadows" (from 01011001; music by Lucassen, Van Giersbergen, and Jonas Renkse)	Hietala, Kürsch, F. Jansen	4:48
22.	"Intergalactic Space Crusaders" (from Star One's Space Metal)	Wilson, Luyten	5:33
23.	"Collision" (from The Theory of Everything; lyrics by Lucassen and Linstruth)	Karevik, Hietala	3:36
24.	"Everybody Dies" (from The Source; lyrics and music by Lucassen and Mike Mills)	Mills, Karevik, Kürsch, Luyten, F. Jansen	5:01
25.	"The Castle Hall" (from Into the Electric Castle)	Soeterboek, Wilson	6:30
26.	"Amazing Flight in Space" (from Into the Electric Castle)	Jay van Feggelen, Arjen Anthony Lucassen	6:20
27.	"Day Eleven: Love" (from The Human Equation)	Reekers, Bovio, Soeterboek, I. Jansen, Lisette van den Berg, Ed Warby	4:04
28.	"The Eye of Ra" (from Star One's Space Metal)	Wilson, Cuijpers, I. Jansen, F. Jansen, Kürsch, Karevik, Van Giersbergen, Hietala, Renkse, Mills, Bovio, Soeterboek, Reekers, Van Feggelen, Luyten, Van den Berg, Lucassen	5:51

^{1}In order of appearance.

== Personnel ==
Vocalists

- Floor Jansen (Nightwish, ex-After Forever, ex-ReVamp)
- Damian Wilson (Headspace, ex-Threshold)
- Hansi Kürsch (Blind Guardian)
- Tommy Karevik (Kamelot, Seventh Wonder)
- Anneke van Giersbergen (Anneke van Giersbergen, The Gentle Storm, VUUR, ex-The Gathering)
- Marco Hietala (Nightwish, Tarot)
- Jonas Renkse (Katatonia, Bloodbath, ex-October Tide)
- Mike Mills (Toehider)
- Marcela Bovio (MaYaN, ex-Stream of Passion, ex-Elfonía)
- Irene Jansen
- Robert Soeterboek (ex-Erik Norlander)
- John Jaycee Cuijpers (Praying Mantis)
- Edward Reekers (ex-Kayak)
- Jay van Feggelen (ex-Bodine)
- Maggy Luyten (Nightmare)
- Lisette van den Berg (Scarlet Stories)

Instrumentalists

- Ed Warby - drums except on "Comatose" and "And the Druids Turned to Stone", additional vocals in "Day Eleven: Love"
- Johan van Stratum (VUUR, ex-Stream of Passion) - bass, except on "Intergalactic Space Crusaders"
- Peter Vink - bass in "Intergalactic Space Crusaders"
- Marcel Coenen (Lemur Voice, Sun Caged) - lead guitar
- Ferry Duijsens - guitar
- Joost van den Broek (ex-After Forever) - keyboards
- Ben Mathot - violin
- Jeroen Goossens - flutes, woodwinds
- Maaike Peterse - cello
- Rob Snijders - percussion in "Comatose" and drums on "And the Druids Turned to Stone"
- Arjen Anthony Lucassen - additional guitar and vocals in "Amazing Flight in Space" and "The Eye of Ra"

== Charts ==
Chart (2018)	Peak position
Dutch Albums (Album Top 100)	6
German Albums (Offizielle Top 100)	13
Hungarian Albums (MAHASZ)	32
Swiss Albums (Schweizer Hitparade)	39
