= The Flame Within =

Studio album by Stream of Passion
- Released: 27 May 2009
- Recorded: 2008
- Genres: Progressive metal, symphonic metal
- Length: 54:40
- Label: Napalm
- Producers: Jochem Jacobs, Joost van den Broek & Stream of Passion

Stream of Passion chronology
Live in the Real World (2006)	The Flame Within (2009)	Darker Days (2011)

Professional ratings
Review scores
Source	Rating
Dangerdog Music Reviews	3.5/5 stars
Kerrang!	3/5 stars
Sea of Tranquility	3.5/5 stars
Lords of Metal	(81/100)
Blistering	8/10 stars
AltSounds	(80/100)
Metal Storm	8.5/10 stars

The Flame Within is Stream of Passion's second studio album, released on 27 May 2009 by Napalm Records. It is the follow-up to their debut album, Embrace the Storm.

It is the first album with guitarists Eric Hazebroek and Stephan Schultz and keyboardist Jeffrey Revet, who are replacing three members who departed in 2007, including Stream of Passion's founder and original composer Arjen Anthony Lucassen, who left as he was planning since its creation. It is also the last album with Davy Mickers on drums.

== Track listing ==
1. "The Art of Loss" - 3:57
2. "In the End" - 4:01
3. "Now or Never" - 4:13
4. "When You Hurt Me the Most" - 4:46
5. "Run Away" - 4:16
6. "Games We Play" - 4:02
7. "This Endless Night" - 4:20
8. "My Leader" - 4:53
9. "Burn My Pain" - 4:18
10. "Let Me In" - 3:32
11. "Street Spirit" - 5:24 (Radiohead cover)
12. "A Part of You" - 4:48
13. "All I Know" - 2:12
14. "Far and Apart" - 4:12 (Bonus track)

== Lineup ==
- Marcela Bovio - Lead Vocals; Violin
- Eric Hazebroek - Lead/Rhythm Guitars
- Stephan Schultz - Lead/Rhythm Guitars
- Johan van Stratum - Bass Guitars
- Jeffrey Revet - Keyboards; Piano
- Davy Mickers - Drums

With:

- Ben Mathot - Violin
- Judith Van Driel - Violin
- Mark Mulder - Viola
- David Faber - Cello

== Release history ==
Country	Date
Finland	27 May 2009
Spain	27 May 2009
Benelux	29 May 2009
France	29 May 2009
Italy	29 May 2009
Sweden	29 May 2009
Europe	1 June 2009
United States	2 June 2009 (by Rykodisc Records)
Canada	2 June 2009 (by Rykodisc Records)
