= Marcela Bovio =

Mexican singer (born 1979)

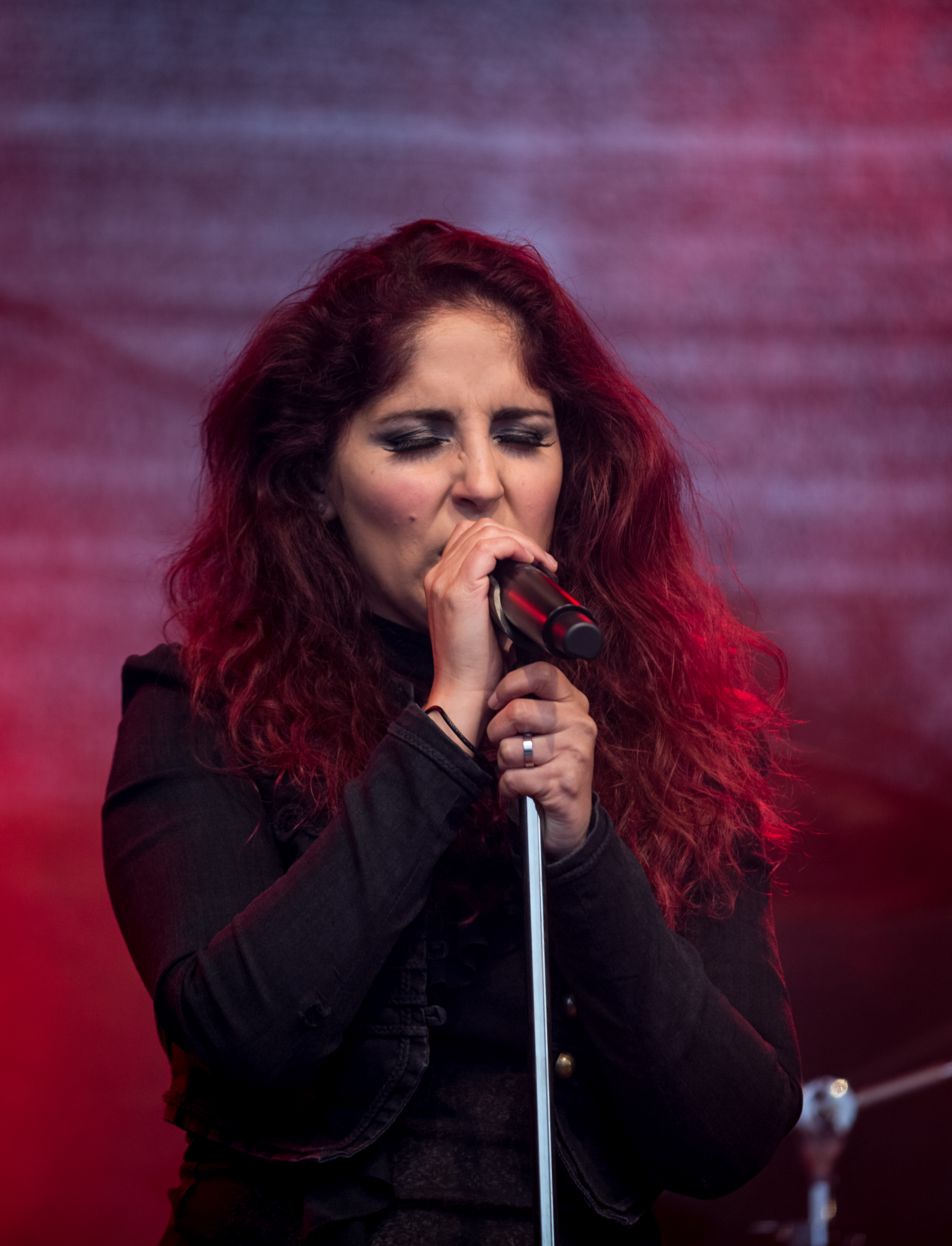
- Bovio performing with The Gentle Storm at Wacken Open Air 2015

Background information
- Born: Marcela Alejandra Bovio Garcia; October 17, 1979 (age 46)
- Origin: Monterrey, Mexico
- Genres: Progressive metal, gothic metal, experimental rock, classical, symphonic metal
- Occupations: Singer, songwriter, musician
- Instruments: Vocals, violin, guitar, piano, bass
- Years active: 1995–present
- Label: Self-published
- Website: marcelabovio.com

Marcela Alejandra Bovio García (born October 17, 1979) is a Mexican singer, violinist and songwriter who is currently a member of the Dutch symphonic metal bands Stream of Passion (since 2005) and MaYaN (since 2017).

In 1995, she joined Hydra, a Mexican metal band, singing and playing violin. In 1999 they released an EP called "Bosquejo". After leaving them, Bovio co-founded the Mexican experimental rock band Elfonía in 2001, which was active until 2006. In 2003, she responded to a "casting call" by Dutch musician Arjen Anthony Lucassen for relatively unknown singers, who chose her to play the character of Wife in the Ayreon album The Human Equation. In 2005, he also picked her for his new project, the progressive metal band Stream of Passion. The band released their debut album, Embrace the Storm, the same year, with Bovio acting as sole lyricist. Lucassen left the band to continue on its own in 2007; this resulted in Bovio acting as band leader and one of the main songwriters (including for composition) on subsequent albums. Stream of Passion initially disbanded in December 2016, but reformed in October 2022.

In September 2016, Bovio independently released her first solo album, Unprecedented, a classical album consisting of original songs she wrote; it was followed by Through Your Eyes in 2018. She joined MaYaN as a full-time member in 2017, after regular collaborations with the band since 2013. She regularly acts as backing vocalist for other bands, notably Epica and The Gentle Storm, and was also one of the founding members of VUUR in 2016.

== Career ==
Bovio started music around the age of five alongside her sister Diana; she sang, played recorder and western concert flute, and studied music theory. At age 17, she formed a cover band with her friends in which she was bass guitarist, but the band later decided that she would perform better as lead vocalist; around that time, she started classical singing lessons and violin, and became interested in rock and heavy metal.

Early in their careers, Bovio and her then-boyfriend Alejandro Millán were members of a band called Hydra.

=== Elfonía (2001–2006) ===
After leaving Hydra, Bovio and Millán formed the experimental/progressive rock band Elfonía in 2001, originally as a duo. They subsequently extended into a quintet for their self-titled debut album in 2003.

Two years later they released their second studio album, This Sonic Landscape, which they described as a fusion of many music genres, including progressive rock, jazz, ambient music, and gothic rock. The band eventually split up in December 2006.

=== Ayreon (2003–present) ===
In 2003, Bovio responded to a "casting call" by Dutch musician Arjen Anthony Lucassen for relatively unknown singers to be featured on one of his albums. Lucassen then chose her to play the character of Wife in his Ayreon album The Human Equation, released in 2004, which became Lucassen's best-selling album at the time.

She was later featured on a new version of "Waracle" on the 2005 Special Edition release of The Final Experiment.

Between September 18 and 20, 2015, most of the cast of The Human Equation, including Bovio, reprised their roles in a production titled The Theater Equation, released the following year under the same name.

She later performed at the first official Ayreon concerts in September 2017, titled Ayreon Universe. One of the performances will be released as a live album in 2018, titled Ayreon Universe – The Best of Ayreon Live; she performed lead vocals on selected songs, and backing vocals as a part of the choir on others.

=== Stream of Passion (2005–present) ===
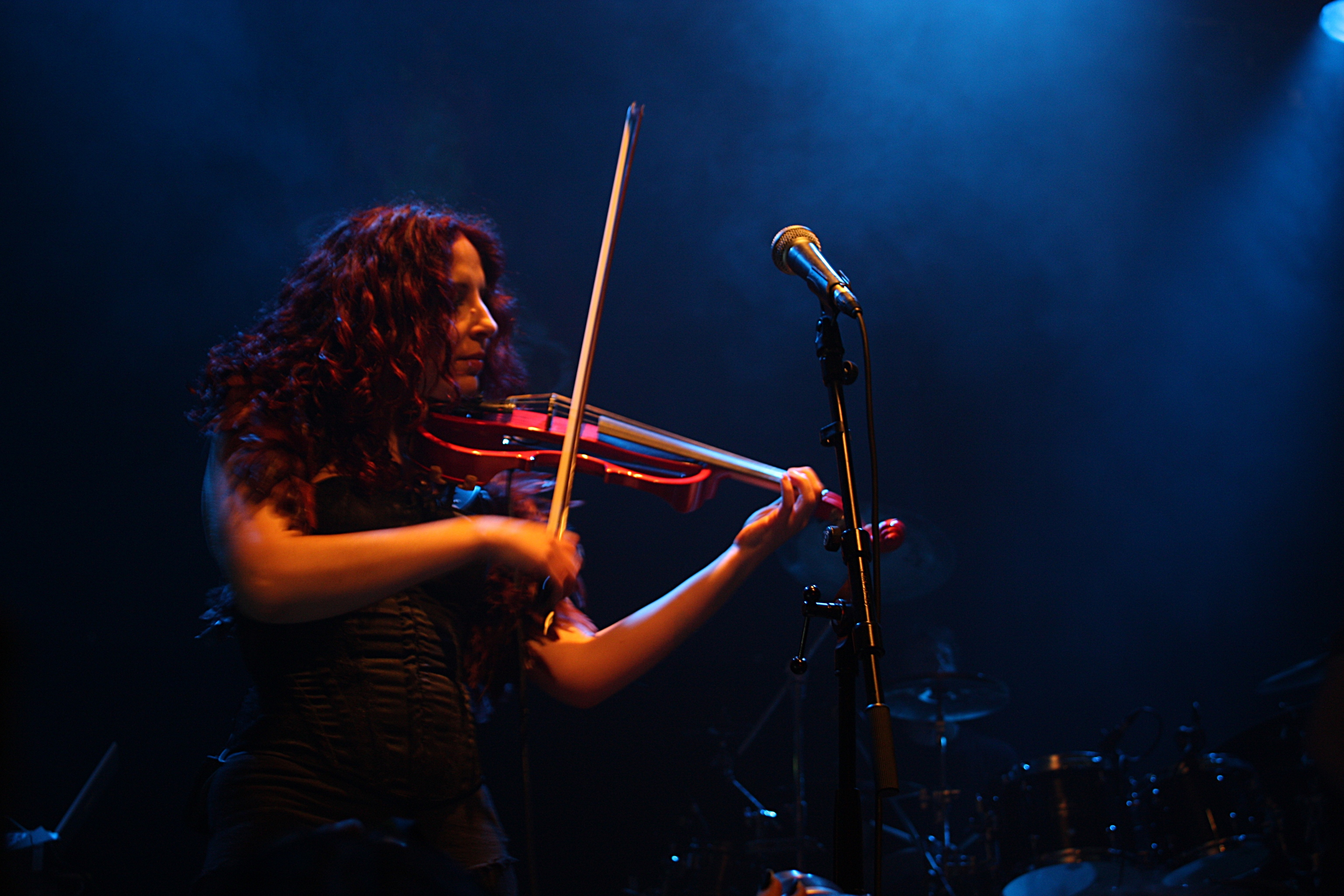
Bovio playing violin with Stream of Passion in 2009.

While recording Bovio, Lucassen realized that he wanted to work with her again; he later decided to form a new band, with her on vocals and violin; they formed Stream of Passion in 2005, with a line-up also including Millán on keyboards, and her future husband Johan van Stratum on bass. The band released their debut album, Embrace the Storm, in 2005, with Lucassen acting as composer and Bovio as lyricist.

After several years of touring and the release of the live album Live in the Real World, several members of Stream of Passion chose to leave the band, including Millán, who had broken up with Bovio, and Lucassen, who had decided to leave to band to continue on its own. As the result, Bovio was left as band leader; she, Van Stratum and producer Joost van den Broek shared songwriting duties on their three subsequent studio albums: The Flame Within in 2009, Darker Days in 2011, and A War of Our Own in 2014. A War of Our Own was produced and released independently, and funded via the crowdfunding site Indiegogo.

In April 2016, the band announced via Facebook that they would be separating at the end of the year, stating

Over the past eleven years we've had the time of our lives playing in stages all over the world and sharing moments of joy on stage. But all good things come to an end, and we feel it's time to move on and search for new musical challenges. We're proud of everything we've achieved, with your help, and we want to end the band history on a high note instead of losing focus, interest and drive. Before parting ways as a band we will perform a few goodbye shows; we also want to record a DVD to serve as a memento of the good times we've had. [...] Once again, we'd like to express our eternal gratitude for the support you've given us all these years. All of us will continue to make music, one way or the other; so we still hope to see you soon on a stage near you. Thank you for being part of the wonderful adventure that has been Stream of Passion!

The band released a live album entitled Memento later that year, and performed their final show on December 28, 2016.

In 2022, a band reunion for two concerts scheduled for September 2023 was announced, and the release of an EP with new songs.

=== MaYaN (2013–present) ===
In 2013, Bovio collaborated with Dutch symphonic death metal MaYaN, led by Mark Jansen of Epica, another band she would later work with. She performed choir parts on their second album, Antagonise, released in January 2014, and performed lead vocals on three tracks: "Bloodline Forfeit", "Devil in Disguise", and "Human Sacrifice".

After performing at MaYan live shows regularly since 2014, Bovio officially joined the band as a full-time member on June 21, 2017. She stated "I've had the pleasure of joining the guys and gals of MaYaN on stage for quite a while now, and every time we've played together it's been a blast! Not only are they all great musicians, but also really cool people to be around, über nice and funny as hell! So I'm very happy to officially be part of the MaYaN family, and I'm looking forward to lots of new adventures with the band!"

=== Solo career (2015–present) ===
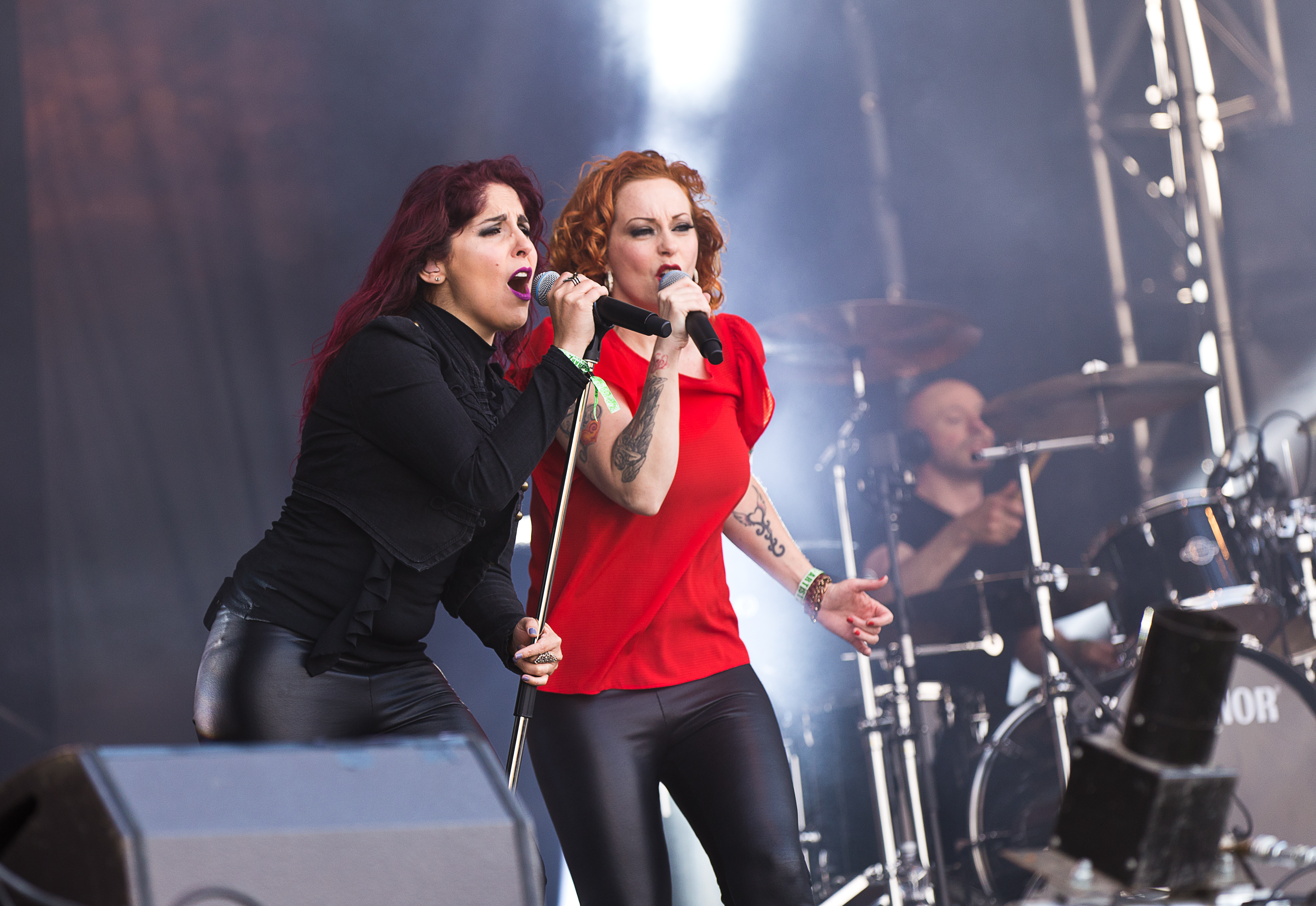
Bovio performing alongside Anneke van Giersbergen in 2015

In 2015, Bovio released her solo debut, an EP titled Found!, consisting of two tracks, "Found!" and "Dime", later to be a part of her first full-length album.

On April 20, 2016, Bovio announced the production of her first solo album, Unprecedented. A departure from her previous works in the heavy metal and rock genres, it is a classical album recorded in a single live session, consisting of ten original songs she wrote, and in which she performs vocals accompagned solely by a string quartet. The album was funded via Crowdfunding on Indiegogo; it reached its original goal of $6,000 in 11 hours, eventually reaching $26,858, 448% of its original goal, and was released independently on September 23, 2016. It featured both songs in English language, and songs in her native Spanish language.

Later that year, Bovio toured as a solo artist, acting as supporting act for Maiden uniteD from November 6 to 24; except for the show on November 24, which featured a string quartet, she performed on all other dates with pianist Erik van Ittersum instead.

On January 24, 2017, Bovio released a second version of the album, titled Unprecedented – The Piano Sessions, with the string quartet replaced by van Ittersum. This version, considered a new studio album by Bovio, was also recorded in a single day, and features four bonus tracks: an original song, two covers, and a version of "The One" from the original album with lyrics in Spanish.

On February 9, 2018, she will perform a concert as a solo artist with van Ittersum, as a part of an event dedicated to singer-songwriters.

Bovio started the recording of her next solo album on January 15, 2018. She announced its title, Through Your Eyes, on June 26, with a planned release in fall. Self-described as "melancholic chamber music", the album is "inspired by 11 different topics, provided to me by 11 different people from all around the world."

=== VUUR (2016–2017) ===
In 2016, singer Anneke van Giersbergen created the band VUUR; she chose Bovio, whom she had worked with as a part of The Gentle Storm, as backing vocalist and secondary lead vocalist, alongside Van Stratum as bass guitarist.

However, when the recording of the band's debut album In This Moment We Are Free – Cities started, Bovio and Van Giersbergen "wanted to take very different directions when it came to the sound and approach of the vocals". After failing to find a compromise that would satisfy both creatively, it was decided that Bovio would leave the band, as the two were afraid that doing otherwise would leave both regretful and hurt their friendship. Bovio made her departure official on April 11, 2017, stating "I'm truly devastated, because I'm a huge fan of Anneke and every single member of the band; they're all incredibly sweet people, as well as top notch musicians. Plus, the songs are so fantastic… this is going to be a revolutionary album! But I have to follow my heart and choose for what I think in the future will bring me (and the rest of the band) happiness, no matter how hard it feels right now. Anneke, Fer, Jord, Johan and Ed [her VUUR bandmates]: you guys are THE BEST. I'd wish you luck but you don't need it, you are going to ROCK this world".

In December 2017, she attended a concert of the band as a fan in Lille, France.

=== Other works ===
Since 2012, Bovio started acting as backing vocalist and occasional secondary lead vocalist for Epica; she was featured in their albums The Quantum Enigma (2014) and The Holographic Principle (2016), their EP The Solace System (2017), and sometimes performs at their live shows.

She was featured on the song "Divorce" by the rock opera project Computer Mind alongside Damian Wilson, with the official music video released on March 13, 2015. The song was later featured in their debut album, The Aspie Project, in 2016, in which she portrayed the character of The Mother.

In 2015 and 2016, Bovio performed as a live member and backing vocalist for The Gentle Storm, a musical project by Arjen Anthony Lucassen and Anneke van Giersbergen; Stream of Passion also performed as their opening act. On February 27, 2015, the band released an official music video for their song "Heart of Amsterdam", Bovio performs backing vocals as in live shows.

=== Vocal teacher ===
On December 9, 2017, Bovio graduated as vocal coach from the Universal Voice Institute in Amsterdam, with a score of 93 out of 100. In January 2018, she became a vocal teacher at the Metal Factory, one of the Netherlands' top MBO schools and the world's first heavy metal-based music school.

In April 2017, progressive rock webzine Progsphere included Marcela Bovio in their "Top 10 Female Singers in Prog Rock, Metal and Around" listing.

== Personal life ==
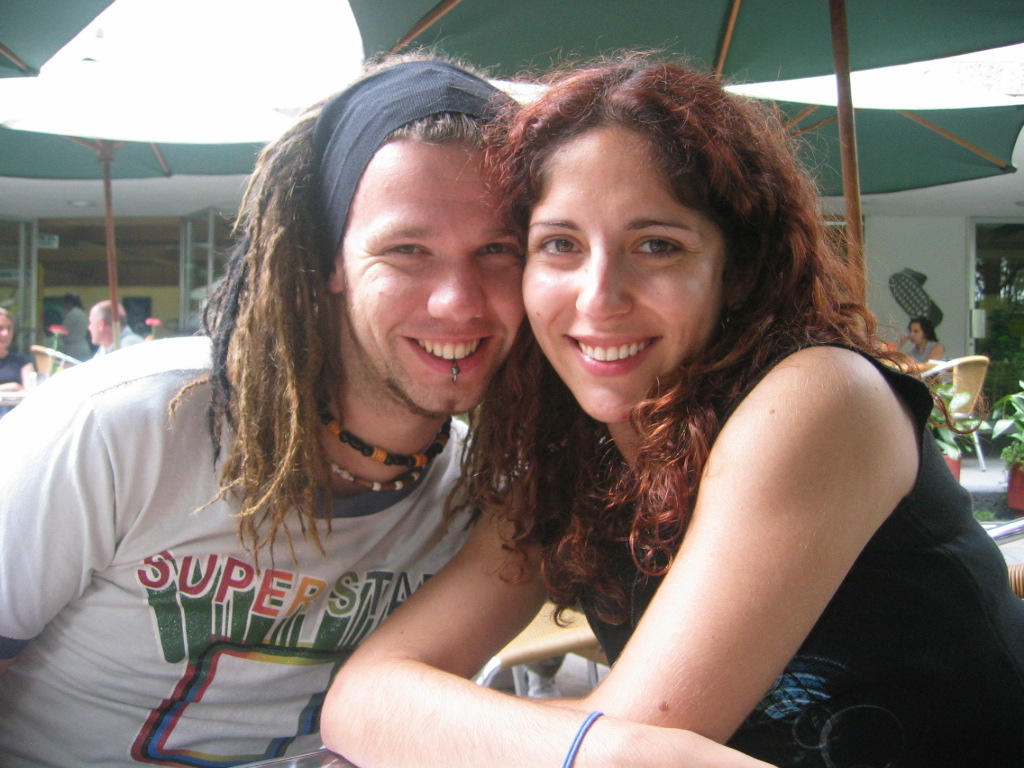
Bovio with Johan van Stratum in 2006

Bovio was born in Monterrey, Nuevo León. She has a sister named Diana, who is an actress and singer who performed as a backing vocalist on early Stream of Passion live shows. She moved to the Netherlands around 2008.

On October 28, 2011, she married Dutch bassist, Johan van Stratum. They separated amicably in 2018.

She considers her favourite musical artists to be the bands Leprous, Dredg, The 3rd and the Mortal, Dead Can Dance, Rush, King Crimson, Pink Floyd, Ayreon, Mogwai, and Muse, and singers Steven Wilson, Ann-Mari Edvardsen, Anneke van Giersbergen, Sarah Vaughan, Cassandra Wilson, Kathleen Battle, Lisa Gerrard, and Kate Bush.

In December 2019, following months of inactivity on her social media Bovio announced that she had been diagnosed with cervical cancer and was undergoing treatment.

As of May 2020, Bovio announced that she is cancer free.

== Discography ==
=== Solo ===
- Found! (EP, 2015)
- Unprecedented (2016)
- Unprecedented – The Piano Sessions (2017)
- Through Your Eyes (2018)
- A song of death, a song of pain (EP, 2022)
- Harmonies Unveiled (2025)

=== Ayreon ===
- The Human Equation (2004) – vocals as Wife
- The Final Experiment (2005 reissue) – vocals on "Waracle"
- The Theater Equation (live, 2016) – vocals as Wife
- Ayreon Universe – The Best of Ayreon Live (live, 2018) – vocals, backing vocals
- Electric Castle Live and Other Tales (live, 2020) - vocals, backing vocals
- Transitus (2020) - vocals as one of the Furies
- 01011001 – Live Beneath the Waves (live, 2024) - vocals, backing vocals
- Ayreon - 30th anniversaary - An Amazing Flight Through Time (live, 2025) – vocals, backing vocals

=== Hydra ===
- Bosquejo (EP, 1999)

=== Elfonía ===
- Elfonía (2003)
- This Sonic Landscape (2005)

=== MaYaN ===
- Undercurrent (EP, 2018)
- Dhyana (2018)

=== Stream of Passion ===
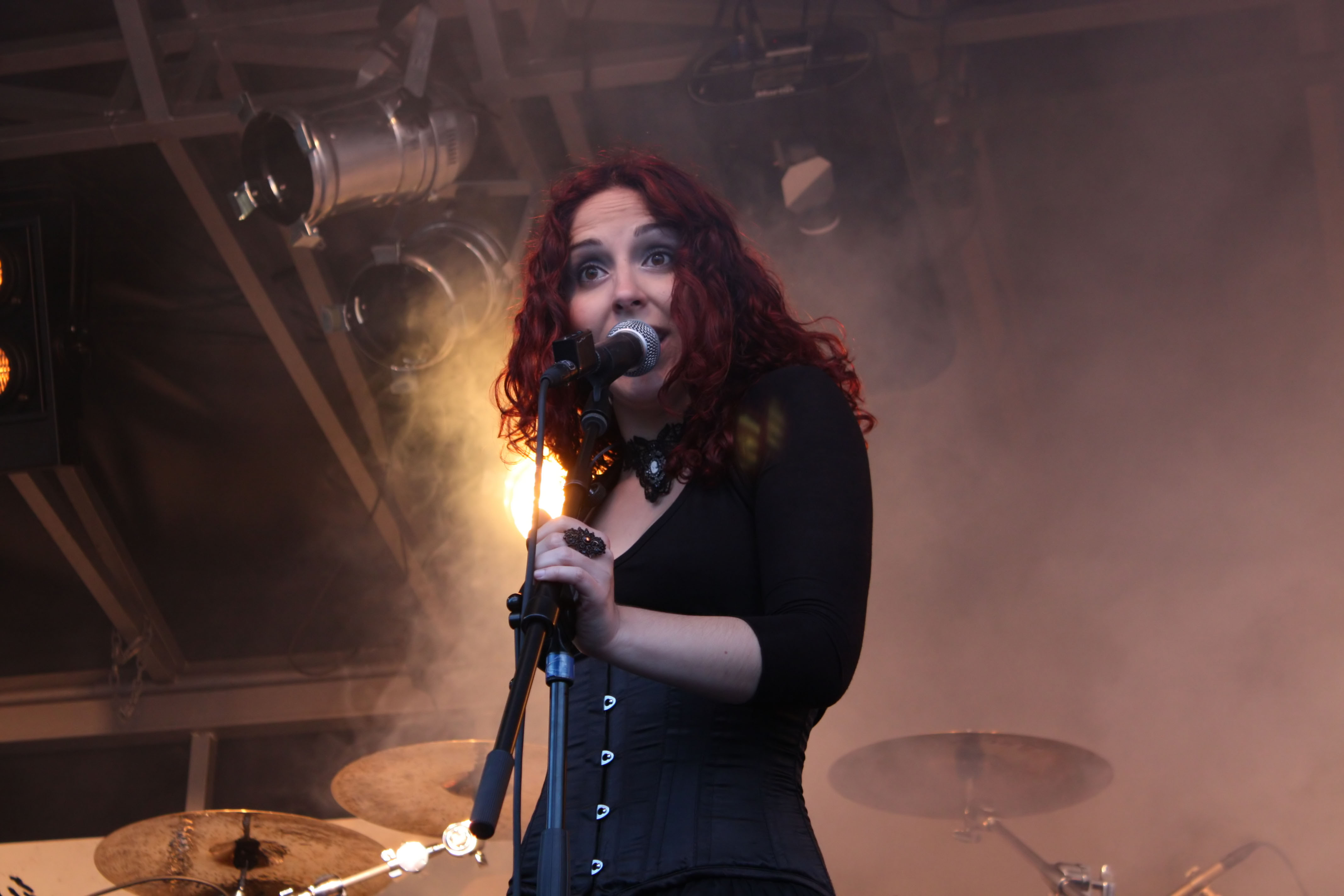
Bovio with Stream of Passion in 2009

- Embrace the Storm (2005)
- Live in the Real World (live, 2006)
- The Flame Within (2009)
- Darker Days (2011)
- A War of Our Own (2014)
- Memento (live, 2016)
- Beautiful Warrior (EP, 2023)

=== Dark Horse | White Horse ===
- Dark Horse | White Horse (2021)

=== As guest ===
- Íon – Madre, protégenos (2006) – spoken word and choir on "Believe"
- Beto Vázquez Infinity – Darkmind (2008) – vocals on "The tunnel of souls (Spanish version)"
- David Adrián – "The Soundtrack Without Film" (2008) – vocals on "Eternal Dominions"
- The Gathering – The West Pole (2009) – vocals on "Pale Traces"
- The Gathering – City from Above (EP, 2009) – vocals and lyrics on "Miniature" and "Pale Traces (Alternate Spanish Version)"
- The Synthetic Dream Foundation – Mechanical Serpent (2010) – vocals on "Glittered Ripples From The Depths"
- To-Mera – Exile (2012) – violin on "The Illusionist"
- ReVamp – Wild Card (2013) – choir
- Subsignal – Paraíso (2013) – vocals on "The Blueprint of a Winter"
- Mayan – Antagonise (2014) – vocals on "Bloodline Forfeit", "Devil in Disguise", and "Human Sacrifice"
- Epica – The Quantum Enigma (2014) – backing vocals
- Maiden uniteD – Remembrance (2015) – backing vocals on "Aces High", violin on "Still Life '15"
- Delirium Cordia - Litost (2015) - vocals on "Getting No Relief"
- Exxiles - Oblivion (2015) - vocals on Llorona
- Kid Harlequin – Itch (2016) – vocals on " Hounds"
- The Hourglass – A Glorious Suicide (2016) – lead vocals
- Epica – The Holographic Principle (2016) – backing vocals
- Epica -The Solace System (EP, 2017) – backing vocals
- Off the Cross – Era (EP, 2018) – backing vocals on "The Goddess"
- Mortemia - The Pandemic Pandemonium Sessions (2021) - vocals in "Death Turns A Blind Eye"
- Star One - Revel in Time (2022) — vocals on "Fate of Man (alternate version)" and "Hand on the Clock (alternate version)", backing vocals
- Mortemia - Mortemia featuring Marcela Bovio(2026) - vocals in "Take on Me"
