= Live in the Real World =

Live In The Real World

Live album by Stream of Passion
- Released: 15 June 2006 (BE); 16 June 2006 (DE); 19 June 2006 (Rest of EU); 18 July 2006 (US)
- Recorded: 2006
- Genre: Progressive metal
- Length: 99:10
- Label: Inside Out Music
- Producer: Arjen Lucassen

Stream of Passion chronology
Embrace the Storm (2005)	Live In The Real World (2006)	The Flame Within (2009)

Arjen Anthony Lucassen chronology
Embrace the Storm (2005)	Live in the Real World (2006)	01011001 (2008)

Arjen Anthony Lucassen Live chronology
Live on Earth (Star One album) (2003)	Live in the Real World (2006)	The Theater Equation (2016)

Professional ratings
Review scores
Source	Rating
Metal.de	7/10

Live in the Real World is the first live CD and DVD album by Dutch/Mexican progressive metal band Stream of Passion, created by Arjen Anthony Lucassen.

It features not only songs from their debut album Embrace the Storm, but also songs from Ayreon, Ambeon and Star One, three other musical projects by Lucassen.

== Critical reception ==
Metal.de called it a great DVD that should interest fans of Lucassen or gothic bands with female vocals. Powermetal.de praised the vocals of the Bovio sisters and said the setlist ingeniously mixes songs from different eras of Lucassen's career.

== Track listing ==
=== Disc one ===
1. "Intro" - 1:28
2. "Spellbound" - 4:17
3. "Passion" - 5:40
4. "Waracle" - 6:16
5. "Wherever You Are" - 5:33
6. "Computer Eyes" - 6:18
7. "Calliopeia" - 5:21
8. "Valley of the Queens" - 4:18
9. "Haunted" - 4:58
10. "The Charm of the Seer" - 3:11
11. "Deceiver/Songs of the Ocean" - 6:11

=== Disc two ===
1. "Day One: Vigil" - 2:02
2. "Day Three: Pain" - 5:57
3. "Nostalgia" - 3:44
4. "Out in the Real World" - 6:31
5. "The Castle Hall" - 6:28
6. "Into the Black Hole/Cold Metal" - 8:32
7. "When the Levee Breaks" - 6:07
8. "Day Eleven: Love" - 6:18

=== Bonus features of the DVD ===
- Behind the Scenes
- Photo Gallery
- Video Clip: Out in the Real World
- Making of the Video Clip
- Tour Diary

== Personnel ==
- Marcela Bovio - lead vocals, violin
- Arjen Anthony Lucassen - lead/rhythm guitar, backing vocals
- Lori Linstruth - lead/rhythm guitar
- Johan van Stratum - bass
- Alejandro Millán - keyboard, piano, backing vocals
- Davy Mickers - drums
- Diana Bovio - backing vocals
- Damian Wilson - guest Vocals

== Charts ==
Chart (2006)	Peak position
Dutch Charts	57
