= In This Moment We Are Free – Cities =

Studio album by VUUR
- Released: 20 October 2017
- Recorded: 2017
- Genre: Progressive metal
- Length: 64:50
- Label: Inside Out Music
- Producer: Joost van den Broek

In This Moment We Are Free – Cities is the debut studio album by Dutch progressive metal band VUUR. It was released on 20 October 2017, via Inside Out Music. Apart from the regular edition, the album was released on special editions including a CD digipak and a gatefold 2LP + CD (including etching on side D).

Band leader and vocalist Anneke van Giersbergen viewed past collaborator Devin Townsend as an influence on the album. Marcela Bovio was initially going to act as secondary vocalist for the album, but left the band mid-production due to divergences about the direction the vocals should take.

== Song information ==
All songs on the album are inspired by cities visited by van Giersbergen during her years of touring. The cities involved are: Berlin, Rotterdam, Beirut, San Francisco, Rio, London, Santiago, Mexico City, Helsinki, Istanbul and Paris. According to van Giersbergen:

The lyrical themes of this album revolve around cities and freedom. Exposure to big cities can be overwhelming and you can feel engulfed by everything around you. At the same time it's easy to be a stranger in a big city and for me that brings out a feeling of freedom as well. This past year I've thought a lot about the virtues of rural versus urban life, since me and my family are moving back to the city. It's very exciting, but at the same time I know that sense of urban solitude from past experiences. The cover artwork represents this duality.

On 8 September 2017, a video for the opening track "My Champion – Berlin" was released. Commenting on this particular track, van Giersbergen said that it "serves as a kind of master of ceremonies. It's both heavy and melodic, it showcases the technical abilities of the band, but you can still sing along to it. [...] This song is about Berlin after World War II. The goddess on the Berlin Victory Column was raised to commemorate military victories, but in the song the city speaks to her and is asking her for help to overcome troubled times". The song was composed by guitarist Jord Otto.

"The Fire – San Francisco" talks about people's lives before, during and after the 1906 San Francisco earthquake. The track "Days Go By – London" talks about the Great Fire of London from the perspective of the fire itself, although it is also a song about hope. It was the first song to be written for the album.

== Critical reception ==
Professional ratings
Review scores
Source	Rating
Angry Metal Guy	4/5 stars
Echoes and Dust	mixed
The Prog Report	positive
Prog	mixed

The album received mixed to positive reviews by critics, with most reviewers praising van Giersbergen's performance, but some criticizing the songwriting.

Angry Metal Guy's GardensTale pointed some problems like an underrepresented bass and an "attempt at a wall of sound during the episodes of triumphant grandeur [that] limit the dynamics", but ended up calling the album "truly excellent" and considered it perhaps "the heaviest music she has put out to date".

In a review for The Prog Report, Craig Ellis Bacon praised the album's heaviness and the individual performances of van Giersbergen and drummer Ed Warby, as well as the album's production. He concluded by saying the album is "a wonderful debut that finds a "new" band in full swing right from the get-go".

Writing for Echoes and Dust, Michael Baker was less enthusiastic about the release. Although he praised van Giersbergen's performance, he felt "the songs themselves don't quite make it to those heights. Throughout VUUR you can hear moments of Devin Townsend and Arjen Lucassen of Ayreon, but there is a feeling of a lack of confidence that means Vuur often take the safer well trod path that ultimately means the songs never hit their stride. They are never heavy or progressive enough to stand out or melodic and catchy enough to work as arena filling power ballads". He ultimately called the band's debut "competent but frustrating".

On Prog, Alex Lynham commented that "for all the talent here, ultimately the record drags. Several album tracks are overlong and similar, and despite the vocal hooks and deft musicianship, there's a lack of 'wow' moments. The LP is at its best when it veers closest to the kind of cinematic metal that the Devin Townsend Project ply their trade in [...]. Overall, this is a promising start, but one that hopefully will see the band developing in a unique direction on future releases".

== Track listing ==
No.	Title	Length
1.	"My Champion – Berlin"	7:36
2.	"Time – Rotterdam"	6:40
3.	"The Martyr and the Saint – Beirut"	5:34
4.	"The Fire – San Francisco"	4:46
5.	"Freedom – Rio"	6:06
6.	"Days Go By – London"	6:30
7.	"Sail Away – Santiago"	6:00
8.	"Valley of Diamonds – Mexico City"	6:24
9.	"Your Glorious Light Will Shine – Helsinki"	5:32
10.	"Save Me – Istanbul"	5:04
11.	"Reunite! – Paris"	4:38
Total length:		64:50

== Personnel ==
- Anneke van Giersbergen - lead and backing vocals, rhythm guitar
- Jord Otto - guitars
- Ferry Duijsens - guitars
- Johan van Stratum - bass
- Ed Warby - drums

Other personnel

- Joost van den Broek - producing, songwriting
- Mark Holcomb (Periphery), Esa Holopainen (Amorphis), Daniel Cardoso (Anathema) - songwriting
- Black & Finch - cover art
