= Darker Days (Stream of Passion album) =

Studio album by Stream of Passion
- Released: 22 June 2011 (Spain/Finland/Sweden); 24 June 2011 (Germany/Austria/Benelux/Italy); 27 June 2011 (EU); 5 July 2011 (USA/Canada)
- Recorded: 2011
- Genre: Progressive metal, symphonic metal, gothic metal
- Length: 58:10
- Label: Napalm
- Producer: Joost van den Broek

Stream of Passion chronology
The Flame Within (2009)	Darker Days (2011)	A War of Our Own (2014)

Professional ratings
Review scores
Source	Rating
Jukebox:Metal	3/5 stars

Darker Days is the third studio album by the Dutch progressive metal band Stream of Passion, released in 2011 on Napalm Records.

It is the first album with drummer Martijn Peters. All producing, engineering, mixing and mastering were made by former After Forever keyboardist Joost van den Broek.

== Track listing ==
All songs written by Marcela Bovio, Johan van Stratum and Joost van den Broek except "The Mirror" by Stream of Passion and "Nadie Lo Ve" by Bovio and Jeffrey Revet

1. "Lost" - 5:27
2. "Reborn" - 3:37
3. "Collide" - 5:20
4. "The Scarlet Mark" - 3:41
5. "Spark" - 2:36
6. "Our Cause" - 4:43
7. "Darker Days" - 4:32
8. "Broken" - 4:47
9. "This Moment" - 3:55
10. "Closer" - 4:37
11. "The Mirror" - 3:34
12. "Nadie lo ve" - 3:04
13. "The World Is Ours" - 3:49
14. "The Hunt" (Digipack bonus track) - 4:28

== Additional ==
During the interview with Valkryian music Marcela stated that Nadie Lo Ve's lyrics were inspired by the death of her grandmother, though the music to that song was written long before.

== Personnel ==
=== Band members ===
- Marcela Bovio - Lead Vocals; Violin
- Eric Hazebroek - Lead/Rhythm Guitars
- Stephan Schultz - Lead/Rhythm Guitars
- Johan van Stratum - Bass
- Jeffrey Revet - Keyboards; Piano
- Martijn Peters - Drums

=== Additional musicians ===
- Gert Wantenaar - bandoleon and accordion
- Ben Mathot, Judith van Driel - violins
- Mark Mulder - viola
- David Faber - cello

=== Production ===
- Joost van den Broek - producer, engineer, mixing, mastering, orchestral arrangements
- Jeffrey Revet - orchestral arrangements
