= Vermillion (Simone Simons album) =

Studio album by Simone Simons
- Released: 23 August 2024
- Length: 46:04
- Label: Nuclear Blast
- Producer: Arjen Lucassen

Singles from Vermillion
- 1. "Aeterna" Released: 7 May 2024; 2. "In Love We Rust" Released: 6 June 2024; 3. "R.E.D." Released: 18 July 2024; 4. "Cradle to the Grave" Released: 23 August 2024

Vermillion is the debut solo album by the Dutch singer Simone Simons, lead singer of Epica. It was released on 23 August 2024.

== Track listing ==
Vermillion track listing
No.	Title	Lyrics	Music	Length
1.	"Aeterna"	Simone Simons; Lori Linstruth; Gjalt Lucassen; Jaap Toorenaar	Arjen Lucassen	6:02
2.	"In Love We Rust"	Simone Simons; Lori Linstruth	Arjen Lucassen	4:46
3.	"Cradle to the Grave" (featuring Alissa White-Gluz)	Simone Simons; Lori Linstruth	Arjen Lucassen	3:59
4.	"Fight or Flight"	Simone Simons; Lori Linstruth	Arjen Lucassen	5:24
5.	"Weight of My World"	Simone Simons; Lori Linstruth	Arjen Lucassen	4:21
6.	"Vermillion Dreams"	Simone Simons; Lori Linstruth	Arjen Lucassen	4:36
7.	"The Core" (featuring Mark Jansen)	Simone Simons; Lori Linstruth	Arjen Lucassen	3:56
8.	"Dystopia"	Simone Simons; Lori Linstruth	Arjen Lucassen	4:44
9.	"R.E.D." (featuring Mark Jansen)	Simone Simons; Lori Linstruth	Arjen Lucassen	4:04
10.	"Dark Night of the Soul"	Simone Simons	Arjen Lucassen; Joost van den Broek	4:12
Total length:				46:04

=== Notes ===
- "Weight of My World" is the only multilingual song on the album that contains lyrics in German, Dutch and English.

== Personnel ==
- Simone Simons – vocals
- Arjen Lucassen – all other instruments

Additional musicians

- Koen Herfst – drums
- Rob van der Loo – bass

Special guests

- Mark Jansen – growls on "The Core" and "R.E.D."
- Alissa White-Gluz – vocals on "Cradle to the Grave"
- Joost van den Broek – piano on "Dark Night of the Soul"
- Perttu Kivilaakso – cello on "Dark Night of the Soul"
- John Jaycee Cuijpers – backing vocals on "Aeterna"
- Ben Mathot – violin on "Aeterna" and "Fight or Flight"
- Jurriaan Westerveld – cello on "In Love We Rust", "Cradle to the Grave", and "Vermillion Dreams"

R.E.D. Crowd Chant

- Coen Janssen
- Mark Jansen
- Isaac Delahaye
- Ariën van Weesenbeek
- Rob van der Loo
- Simone Simons
- Peter Kettenis
- Monique Hooft
- Lori Linstruth
- Arjen Lucassen
- Joost van den Broek
- Jasper Erkens
- Johan van Stratum

Crew

- Simone Simons – lyrics
- Lori Linstruth – lyrics (1–9), photography
- Arjen Lucassen – music, engineering, production, mixing
- Gjalt Lucassen – Latin lyrics on "Aeterna"
- Jaap Toorenaar – Latin lyrics on "Aeterna"
- Joost van den Broek – music (10), mastering
- Hedi Xandt – artwork, design

== Charts ==
Chart performance for Vermillion
Chart (2024)	Peak position
Belgian Albums (Ultratop Flanders)	45
Belgian Albums (Ultratop Wallonia)	176
Dutch Albums (Album Top 100)	11
German Albums (Offizielle Top 100)	72
Swiss Albums (Schweizer Hitparade)	11
UK Rock & Metal Albums (OCC)	2
