= Lori Linstruth =

American guitarist, lyricist and manager

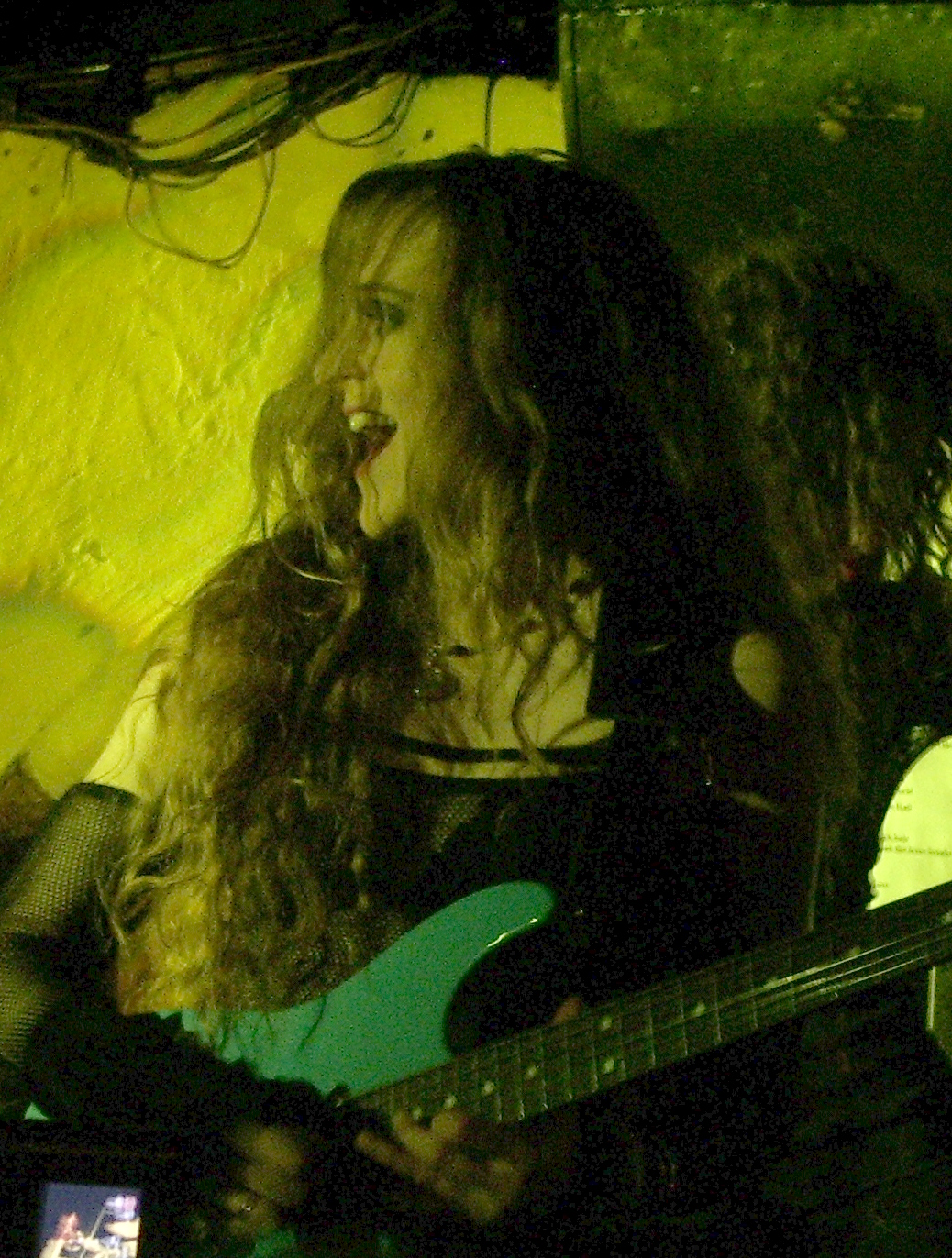
- Lori Linstruth performing guitar with Stream of Passion in 2006.

Background information
- Also known as: Lori Von Linstruth
- Origin: Santa Barbara, California
- Genres: Hard rock, heavy metal, industrial metal, progressive metal, neoclassical metal
- Instruments: Guitar, bass, keyboards
- Years active: Late 80s-2010

Lori Von Linstruth is an American lyricist, music manager and retired guitarist. She currently resides in the Netherlands where she lives with her partner and musical collaborator Arjen Anthony Lucassen.

She is also Lucassen's manager, the webmaster of Lucassen's official website, and was a member of his former bands Stream of Passion and Guilt Machine (notably writing all lyrics for Guilt Machine's sole album On This Perfect Day). Since retiring as a guitarist in 2010, she has continued to work with Lucassen, notably co-writing the lyrics of his Ayreon album The Theory of Everything and of Simone Simons' solo album Vermillion, for which Lucassen wrote the music.

== Personal life ==
She currently resides in the Netherlands where she lives with her partner and musical collaborator Arjen Anthony Lucassen; she previously lived in Sweden. In a 2017 interview, Lucassen mentioned that, in addition to her work with him, she was also an English teacher.

== Biography ==
=== Warbride ===
Linstruth first came to prominence in the late 1980s when she was featured in Mike Varney's "Spotlight" column in Guitar Player magazine. She moved from Santa Barbara to Los Angeles and, after a short stint in local band Jaded Lady, formed Warbride along with former Rude Girl drummer Sandy Sledge. Linstruth left Warbride in order to move to Sweden with her then husband and the band continued for a brief period with only one original member, keyboard player Velia Garay.

Linstruth attempted to reform the original Warbride in the early 2000 however, the project was put on hold when Linstruth became more involved in Arjen Anthony Lucassen's projects which led to her becoming a member of Stream of Passion.

=== Stream of Passion ===
Around 2004, Linstruth became involved in Arjen Anthony Lucassen's side-project Stream of Passion, touring extensively in 2006 and 2007. Lucassen had discovered her via a video on her website invited her over to his studio to see if some sort of co-operation was possible. He asked her to record some guitar parts for the re-release of his Ayreon album The Final Experiment and liked it, as the result invited her to join Stream of Passion.

Linstruth decided to leave the band in March 2007, following the departure of Lucassen.

=== Other projects ===
In 2006 Linstruth contributed with two solos on the tribute-project Mountain of Power, led by guitarist Janne Stark.

By late 2007, Lori left Sweden and headed for the Netherlands where she became Lucassen's manager.

In February 2009, it was announced that Linstruth would contribute to Lucassen's latest project, Guilt Machine, as a guitarist and lyricist.

In 2010 Linstruth announced in her blog that she had lost her passion of playing guitar and instead would concentrate on dog training.

== Musical style ==
While Linstruth herself promotes Rammstein as one of her main influences, she is also known to be influenced by Uli Jon Roth, Michael Schenker and Yngwie J. Malmsteen.

She used wah and tremolo effects extensively.

== Discography ==
=== Solo ===
- Lori Linstruth Demo (2004)

=== Guilt Machine ===
- On This Perfect Day (2009)

=== Stream of Passion ===
- Embrace the Storm (2005)
- Live in the Real World (2006)

=== As guest guitarist ===
- Mountain of Power - guest solos on "Out of the Darkness" and "Mountain of Power" (an instrumental track)
- Ayreon - 01011001 (2008)
- Ayreon - The Final Experiment (2005 bonus disc)

=== Other ===
- Star One - Victims of the Modern Age (2010) - manager, filming and editing of "The Making of Victims of the Modern Age"
- Arjen Anthony Lucassen - Lost in the New Real (2012) - Photography, creative consultant
- Ayreon - The Theory of Everything (2013) - lyrics, photography
- The Gentle Storm - The Diary (2015) - creative consultant
- Ayreon - The Theater Equation (2016) - photography, video editor
- Ayreon - The Source (2017) - creative consultant, filming and editing of "Behind the Scenes" and "Interviews" for bonus DVD, manager
- Simone Simons - Vermillion (2024) - lyrics, photography, backing vocals on "R.E.D."

== See also ==
- Arjen Anthony Lucassen
- Stream of Passion
- Guilt Machine
