= A War of Our Own =

Studio album by Stream of Passion
- Released: 18 April 2014
- Recorded: October 2013 – February 2014 at Sandlane Recording Facilities, Rijen, The Netherlands
- Genres: Progressive metal, symphonic metal, gothic metal
- Length: 59:30
- Label: PIAS/Rough Trade
- Producer: Joost van den Broek

Stream of Passion chronology
Darker Days (2011)	A War of Our Own (2014)	Beautiful Warrior (2023)

Professional ratings
Review scores
Source	Rating
MetalTalk.net	4.5/5 stars
Femme Metal Webzine	8/10 stars

A War of Our Own is the fourth studio album by the Dutch progressive metal band Stream of Passion, and the last before their split from 2016 to 2022. Stream of Passion produced the album after leaving Napalm Records, financing it through crowdfunding website Indiegogo, and was their only album with the same line-up as its predecessor.

== Background ==
Having signed to Napalm Records in 2008, Stream of Passion parted with the record label in 2012. Speaking about the split, lead vocalist Marcela Bovio said:

"I would rather not get very specific but let's say that we didn't think that we had the same ideas, and we didn't really think that they 'got' us that well".

Soon after, the band decided to fund their planned fourth album by way of fan donations, announcing a campaign through the crowdfunding website Indiegogo on 16 July 2013. Regarding the decision to fund the album this way, bass player Johan van Stratum commented:

"Times are changing, and so is the production of music and the way it is consumed. By taking things in their own hands, bands have more freedom and fans are enabled to support their favorites directly."

Donations to the campaign remained open for 3 months, with a target of raising €25,000 to produce the new album. The campaign eventually generated almost twice the target goal, finishing at €43,881. As a reward, for their fans after surpassing their secondary goal of €40,000, the band recorded an acoustic set of songs from the upcoming album, exclusively for those who had contributed to the album's funding.

A lyric video for the song "The Curse" was released on 7 March 2014 and an official music video for "A War of Our Own" was released on 16 April 2014.

== Track listing ==
All tracks are written by Marcela Bovio, Johan van Stratum and Joost van den Broek except where noted.

No.	Title	Length
1.	"Monster"	6:00
2.	"A War of Our Own" (Bovio, van Stratum, van den Broek, Daniel Cardoso)	4:09
3.	"The Curse"	4:24
4.	"Autophobia"	3:48
5.	"Burning Star"	3:43
6.	"For You"	3:00
7.	"Exile"	5:15
8.	"Delirio"	5:02
9.	"Earthquake"	4:27
10.	"Secrets"	4:38
11.	"Don't Let Go"	6:00
12.	"Out of the Darkness"	4:43
13.	"The Distance Between Us" (digipack bonus track)	4:21

== Charts ==
Chart (2014)	Peak position
Dutch Albums Chart	42

== Personnel ==
=== Stream of Passion ===
- Marcela Bovio – lead vocals, violin
- Eric Hazebroek – guitar
- Stephan Schultz – guitar
- Johan van Stratum – bass
- Jeffrey Revet – keyboards, synths
- Martijn Peters – drums

=== Additional musicians ===
- Ben Mathot – violin
- David Faber – cello

=== Production ===
- Joost van den Broek – production, mastering, mixing
- Alexandra V Bach – cover art
- Tim Tronckoe – photography
