= Kalisia =

- Origin: France
- Genres: Progressive metal, death metal, symphonic metal, electronic
- Years active: 2018–present
- Label: No label
- Members: Brett Caldas-Lima; Thibaut Gerard; Laurent Pouget; Bruno Michel; Élodie Bouchonnet; Anthony Druz
- Past members: Loïc Tézénas; Laurent Bendahan
- Website: http://www.kalisia.com/

Kalisia is a French progressive metal band.

In 2009 the band released their first full-length album, Cybion, originally planned for 2003, mainly consisting of a one-hour song. It features guest appearances by Angela Gossow, Paul Masvidal and Arjen Anthony Lucassen.

Although never officially disbanded, Kalisia has been inactive since 2012, with no public announcements, performances or releases made since.

== Band members ==
Current members

- Brett Caldas-Lima - lead vocals, guitars, programming (1994–present)
- Thibaut Gerard - bass (1994–present)
- Laurent Pouget - keyboards (1994–present)
- Bruno Michel - guitars (2004–present)
- Élodie Bouchonnet - lead vocals, flute, saxophone (2005–present)
- Anthony Druz - drums (2010–present)

Former members

- Loïc Tézénas - guitars (1994–2004)
- Laurent Bendahan - drums (1994–2004)

== Discography ==
- Whisper (demo, 1994)
- Skies (demo, 1995)
- Cybion (2009)
