= Alejandro Millán =

Mexican musician

- Born: July 10, 1980 (age 46); Monterrey, Mexico
- Genres: Progressive rock, Progressive metal, Ambient, Jazz, Symphonic metal, Gothic metal
- Occupations: Musician, singer
- Instruments: Keyboards, piano, vocals
- Years active: 2002–present
- Labels: The Note Garden Records, Inside Out/SPV, Napalm

Alejandro Millán Montoya (born July 10, 1980, Monterrey, Mexico) is the singer, keyboardist, and composer for the band Hello Madness. After winning a music production contest by CONARTE, he released the album "Light and Life After Dusk". He founded the progressive band Elfonía in 2002, releasing the albums Elfonía and This Sonic Landscape.

Millán started playing piano and keyboards for Stream of Passion in 2004, releasing the studio album Embrace the Storm and the live CD/DVD Live in the Real World. He quit the group in 2007. He also contributed on Noah (2010), the debut album of Unwritten Pages. In 2012, he earned a degree in music at Los Angeles College of Music. His song "Feel Alright" was a finalist in the International Songwriting Competition 2012 competing for Best Rock Song and Song of the Year.

== Discography ==
=== Studio albums ===
==== Elfonía ====
- Elfonía (2003)
- This Sonic Landscape (2005)

==== Stream of Passion ====
- Embrace the Storm (2005)

==== Hello Madness ====
- Light and Life After Dusk (2008)

=== Live albums ===
==== Stream of Passion ====
- Live in the Real World (2006)
