= Johan van Stratum =

Dutch bassist (born 1982)

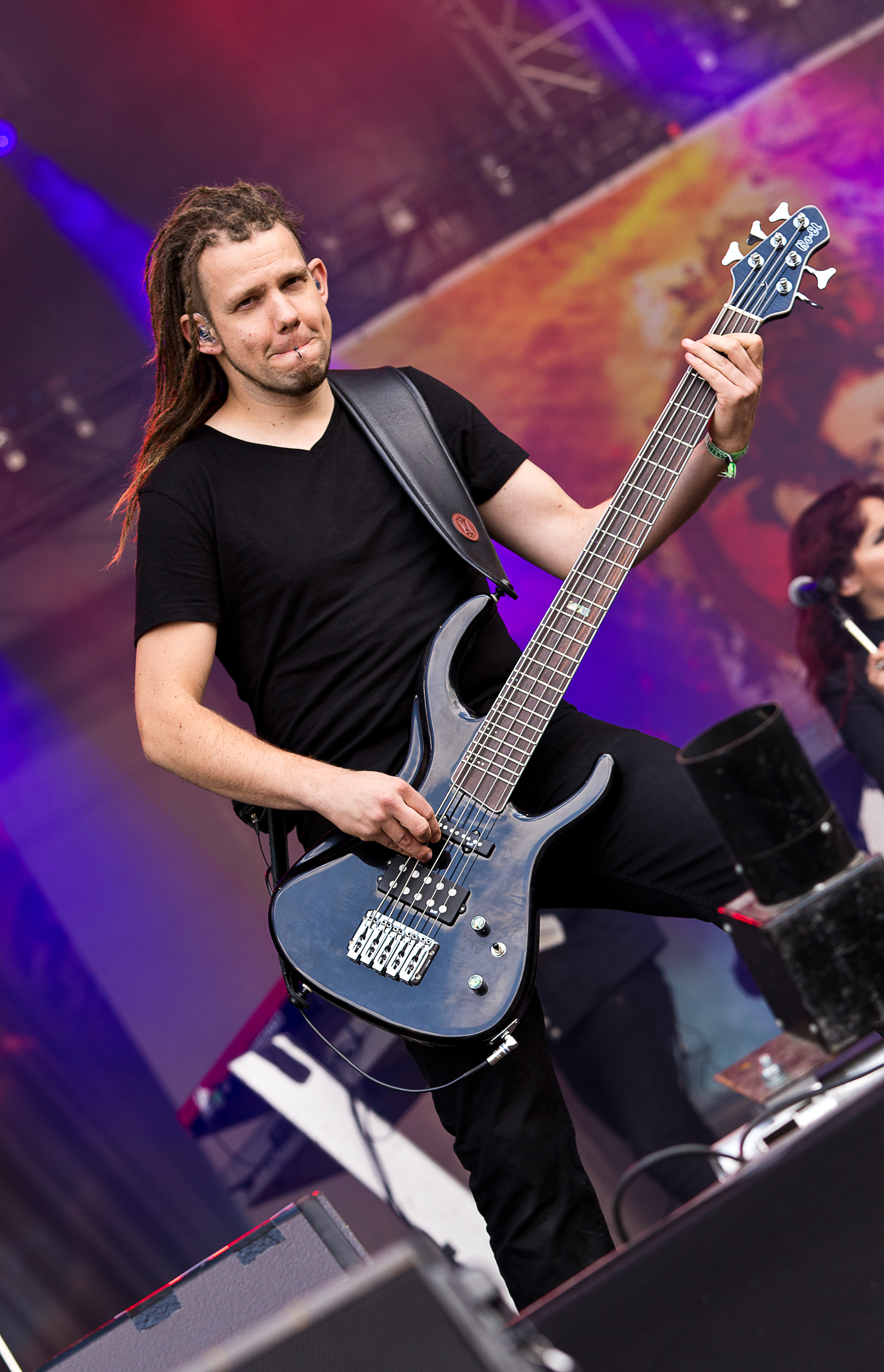
- Van Stratum in 2015

Background information
- Born: 15 April 1982 (age 43) Netherlands
- Genres: Progressive metal, gothic metal, progressive rock
- Occupation: Bassist
- Years active: 1990s–present

Johan van Stratum (born 15 April 1982) is a Dutch bassist, currently playing live for German power metal band Blind Guardian and Ayreon.

He was the bassist of Stream of Passion, and one of the two founding members to stay in the band until it disbanded in 2016. He also played bass live for Ayreon and The Gentle Storm, VUUR. In July 2021 he was announced as the bass player of German power metal band Blind Guardian.

== Career ==
Van Stratum started music at age 14 by singing, before being pushed to play bass by his friends. His first instrument was a brandless bass guitar brought for 50 euros. He considers his biggest influences Tim Commerford of Rage Against the Machine, Chris Wolstenholme of Muse, and Reginald Arvizu of Korn.

His first band No Problem was with future After Forever member and Stream of Passion collaborator Joost van den Broek, with whom he studied music. He also used to teach bass guitar and is co-founder of the only government accredited Metal education Metal Factory in Eindhoven NL.

Arjen Anthony Lucassen formed Stream of Passion in 2005, with a line-up including Van Stratum on bass. The band released their debut album Embrace the Storm in 2005, with Lucassen acting as composer and Marcela Bovio as lyricist.

After several years of touring and the release of the live album Live in the Real World, several members of Stream of Passion chose to leave the band, including Lucassen, who had decided to leave to band to continue on its own. As the result, Van Stratum, Bovio and Van den Broek shared songwriting duties on their three subsequent studio albums: The Flame Within in 2009, Darker Days in 2011, and A War of Our Own in 2014. A War of Our Own was produced and released independently, and funded via the crowdfunding site Indiegogo.

In April 2016, the band announced via Facebook that they would be separating at the end of the year, stating "Over the past eleven years we've had the time of our lives playing in stages all over the world and sharing moments of joy on stage. But all good things come to an end, and we feel it's time to move on and search for new musical challenges. We're proud of everything we've achieved, with your help, and we want to end the band history on a high note instead of losing focus, interest and drive. Before parting ways as a band we will perform a few goodbye shows; we also want to record a DVD to serve as a memento of the good times we've had. [...] Once again, we'd like to express our eternal gratitude for the support you've given us all these years. All of us will continue to make music, one way or the other; so we still hope to see you soon on a stage near you. Thank you for being part of the wonderful adventure that has been Stream of Passion!"

The band released a live album entitled Memento later that year, and performed their final show on 28 December 2016.

In 2016, Anneke van Giersbergen created the band VUUR, and chose Van Stratum, whom she had worked with as a part of The Gentle Storm, as bass guitarist. He was featured on the band's first album, In This Moment We Are Free – Cities, released on 2017.

== Discography ==
=== Stream of Passion ===
- Embrace the Storm (2005)
- Live in the Real World (live, 2006)
- The Flame Within (2009)
- Darker Days (2011)
- A War of Our Own (2014)
- Memento (live, 2016)

=== VUUR ===
- In This Moment We Are Free – Cities (2017)

=== Blind Guardian ===
- The God Machine (2022)

=== As a guest ===
- ReVamp: Wild Card (2013)
- The Gentle Storm: The Diary (2015)
- Ayreon: The Theater Equation (live, 2016)
- Ayreon: Ayreon Universe – The Best of Ayreon Live (live, 2018)
- Ayreon: Into the Electric Castle Live and Other Tales (live, 2020)
- Ayreon: 01011001 – Live Beneath the Waves (live, 2024)
