= Embrace the Storm =

Studio album by Stream of Passion
- Released: 24 October 2005
- Recorded: 2005
- Genre: Progressive metal
- Length: 53:45
- Label: Inside Out Music
- Producer: Arjen Anthony Lucassen

Stream of Passion chronology
Embrace the Storm (2005)	Live in the Real World (2006)

Arjen Anthony Lucassen chronology
The Human Equation (2004)	Embrace the Storm (2005)	Live in the Real World (2006)

Singles from Embrace the Storm
- 1. "Wherever You Are" Released: 18 October 2005; 2. "Out in the Real World" Released: 27 February 2006

Professional ratings
Review scores
Source	Rating
Metal.de	7/10
Rock Hard	7/10

Embrace the Storm is Dutch progressive metal band Stream of Passion's debut album released on 24 October 2005 by InsideOut Music. It was preceded by the single "Wherever You Are" (18 October 2005) and followed by the single "Out in the Real World" (27 February 2006), both featured on this album.

The album was also released as a dual disc, including on the DVD side the entire album in 5.1 Dolby Surround, a documentary on the making of the album, the video clip of the song "Passion" and a photo gallery.

It is the only album with founder, guitarist, keyboardist and composer Arjen Anthony Lucassen, guitarist Lori Linstruth, and keyboardist Alejandro Millán.

== Recording the album ==
The songs were transferred between band members via the internet. Because of the different countries the band members lived in, the album was recorded all around the world: the main recording, mixing and producing took place at Lucassen's personal studio, The Electric Castle in the Netherlands. The drums were recorded at Fendal Soundstudios (also in the Netherlands) by Hans van Vondelen. The vocals were recorded at The North Garden Records in Mexico by Alejandro Millán. The lead guitars was recorded at Träsmark Studios in Sweden. The album was mastered at Fine Tune by Peter van 't Riet.

== Critical reception ==
Metal.de said the album is too ordinary and lacks bite. Vampster praised the singer's voice and said the melodies were initially unimpressive but became more appealing over time. It was also noted that Ayreon fans may find the album too one-dimensional.

== Track listing ==
1. "Spellbound" – 3:33
2. "Passion" – 5:19
3. "Deceiver" – 5:08
4. "I'll Keep On Dreaming" – 3:44
5. "Haunted" – 4:30
6. "Wherever You Are" – 5:07
7. "Open Your Eyes" – 5:13
8. "Embrace the Storm" – 4:11
9. "Breathing Again" – 3:37
10. "Out in the Real World" – 4:31
11. "Nostalgia" – 3:07
12. "Calliopeia" – 5:38

== Personnel ==
=== Band members ===
- Marcela Bovio - lead and backing vocals, violin
- Arjen Anthony Lucassen - guitars, keyboards
- Lori Linstruth - lead guitars
- Johan van Stratum - bass
- Alejandro Millán - piano
- Davy Mickers - drums

=== Additional musicians ===
- Robert Baba, Jenneke Tesselaar, Herrman van Haaren, Friedmar Hitzer - violins
- Marieke van der Heyden, Tjakina Oosting, Jacqueline Hamelink - celli
- Joost van den Broek - transcriptions for celli
- Robert Baba - transcriptions for violins

=== Production ===
- mixing, producing and main recording - Arjen Anthony Lucassen
- mastering - Peter van 't Riet
- photos - Edwin van Hoof (live pics), Alan Flores (Marcela pics), Lex Hulleman (videoclip stills), Stefan Schipper (band pics)
- make-up - Lida van Straaten (band pics), Oscar Acosta (Marcela Pics).

== Charts ==
"Out in the Real World"

Chart (2006)	Peak position
Dutch Mega Singles Top 100	49
