= Elfonía =

Mexican experimental rock band

- Origin: Mexico
- Genres: Experimental rock, avant-garde metal, gothic metal, progressive metal, ambient, jazz fusion
- Years active: 2001–2006
- Label: The Note Garden Records
- Past members: Marcela Bovio; Alejandro Millán; Roberto Quintanilla; Pablo González; Javier Garagarza

Elfonía was a Mexican experimental rock band with elements of progressive and ambient music. It was founded by Alejandro Millán and Marcela Bovio in 2001 following the leaving of their previous band, Hydra.

The band's line-up was extended in 2003 for purposes of a major music festival held in Monterrey, Mexico with Roberto Quintanilla on lead guitar, Pablo González on bass guitar, Javier Garagarza on drums with Jose Alberto Vidal Rodríguez performing vocals. By the end of the year, Elfonía independently produced their self-titled first studio album which marked their breakthrough into mainstream music. In November 2003, Marcela was invited by Arjen Anthony Lucassen to perform vocals on Ayreon's album The Human Equation.

Two years later the band released their second studio album, This Sonic Landscape, a fusion of many music genres, including progressive rock, jazz, ambient music and goth rock. Shortly afterwards, Elfonía went on a successful tour around Mexico in order to promote their newest effort.

The band split up in December 2006. Bovio and Millán continued in Stream of Passion with Lucassen.

== Personnel ==
- Alejandro Millán - keyboards, rhythm guitar
- Marcela Bovio - vocals, violin
- Roberto Quintanilla - lead guitar
- Pablo González - bass guitar
- Javier Garagarza - drums

== Discography ==
=== Studio albums ===
==== Elfonía (2003) ====
The band's debut album was released on January 14, 2003. It was recorded at Caura Studio in Monterrey, Mexico and released independently by Marcela Bovio and Alejandro Millán.

Track listing

No.	Title	Length
1.	"Eldalindalë"	4:46
2.	"Nuestro descanso"	4:04
3.	"Aura"	4:06
4.	"Drama"	3:42
5.	"Dentro"	4:14
6.	"Modos humanos"	4:22
7.	"Hatshepsut"	4:53
8.	"Añoranza"	4:05
9.	"La vida que emana"	0:59
10.	"De todas mis heridas"	4:00
11.	"Alma infinita"	6:01

Personnel

- Alejandro Millán - keyboards
- Marcela Bovio - vocals, violin
- Roberto Quintanilla - lead guitar
- Pablo González - bass guitar
- Javier Garagarza - drums
