= The Theater Equation =

Live album by Ayreon
- Released: 17 June 2016
- Recorded: 20 September 2015
- Genre: Progressive metal, progressive rock
- Label: Inside Out Music
- Producer: Arjen Anthony Lucassen

Arjen Anthony Lucassen live chronology
Live in the Real World (2006)	The Theater Equation (2016)	Ayreon Universe – The Best of Ayreon Live (2018)

Arjen Anthony Lucassen chronology
The Diary (2015)	The Theater Equation (2016)	The Source (2017)

Ayreon chronology
The Theory of Everything (2013)	The Theater Equation (2016)	The Source (2017)

The Theater Equation is a live album and DVD/Blu-ray by Arjen Anthony Lucassen's progressive rock/metal rock opera project Ayreon. The Theater Equation originally consisted of a four live performances, with cast, choir and small orchestra, of the 2004 album The Human Equation, as an actual rock opera, complete with mise-en-scène. It is the first Ayreon live release, although Ayreon songs had previously been featured on live albums by two of Lucassen's other musical projects (Live on Earth by Star One and Live in the Real World by Stream of Passion), and marks the first time an Ayreon album was performed live in its entirety. The Theater Equation consisted of four shows, all played in Rotterdam between September 18 and 20, 2015, with the last performance being the one recorded for the album.

The project, directed by Lucassen's former manager Yvette Boertje, originally was to consist of three fan-made concerts performed under the title Ayreon's The Human Equation Theater Experience; however, after some of the original cast and musicians showed interest in the project, the organizers decided to make it a greater venture. Despite using the Ayreon name on promotional material with the blessing of Lucassen, The Theater Equation shows were not official Ayreon concerts; however, the recording was released as an official Ayreon product. The Ayreon Universe shows, which took place in 2017, were the first official Ayreon concerts.

Most of the cast of the original album was featured on the tour, including James LaBrie of Dream Theater (Me), Marcela Bovio of Stream of Passion (Wife), former Mostly Autumn member Heather Findlay (Love), Eric Clayton (Reason), and Irene Jansen (Passion). Despite the announcement that he would not take part of the shows due to his reluctance to play live and that he will only support the project as a support advisor, Lucassen performed the part of the Forever of the Stars; his original, more significant part as Best Friend was performed by Wudstik. Some other regular collaborators of Lucassen joined the project, including drummer Ed Warby, and singer Anneke van Giersbergen who replaced Mikael Åkerfeldt as Fear. It also featured a choir, nicknamed the "Epic Rock Choir", that Lucassen hired during production to perform choirs for the album The Diary by his and van Giersbergen's new project The Gentle Storm.

== Synopsis ==
After a car accident, a man ("Me") falls into a coma, and, in his head, is confronted with his past, his emotions, and his current situation as he lays trapped inside his own mind. The circumstances surrounding the accident are mysterious, as Me ploughed into a tree on a deserted road in broad daylight. Following this, he slips into a twenty-day coma. While each day is represented by a single song on the album the theater show uses stylistic means like several repetitions. Each song follows a slightly different format, though there are major common themes, such as the presence of Me's manifest emotions in his dream world including Fear, Reason, and Pride; the presence of Me's Wife, his Best Friend, a doctor and a nurse at his bedside; and the past events that Me is forced to reflect on.

The plot builds from Me's early broken state to his eventual rebirth as a new and better man. His own dark past, in which he suffered beneath an abusive Father, was driven to become merciless by school bullies, and eventually betrayed his closest friend for his own benefit; is intertwined with the plot surrounding Wife and Best Friend, eventually revealing the cause of the accident: Me had witnessed the two sharing an intimate moment, and had swerved his car into a tree in his despair. The three eventually come clean and forgive each other, leading Me to conquer his negative emotions and escape his nightmarish prison.

After the final song a computerised voice announces the shut-down of the Dream Sequencer. Later the voice of a Forever (Arjen Anthony Lucassen) then speaks the final words "The Human Equation.... I remember", tying its events into the overall Ayreon plot that began with the album The Final Experiment.

== Track listing ==
All lyrics are written by Arjen Anthony Lucassen except where noted; all music is composed by Lucassen.

CD I
No.	Title	Lyrics	Length
1.	"Day One: Vigil"		1:45
2.	"Day Two: Isolation"		8:12
3.	"Day Three: Pain"	Lucassen, Devin Townsend	4:50
4.	"Day Four: Mystery"		6:05
5.	"Day Five: Voices"		6:52
6.	"Reprise Pain 1"		0:34
7.	"Day Six: Childhood"		5:10
8.	"Day Seven: Hope"		2:22
9.	"Day Eight: School"	Lucassen, Townsend	4:27
10.	"Reprise Childhood"		1:08
11.	"Day Nine: Playground" (Adaptation of Edvard Grieg's Morning mood)		2:06
12.	"Day Ten: Memories"		3:52
13.	"Reprise Pain 2"		1:39
14.	"Day Eleven: Love"		4:07

CD II
No.	Title	Lyrics	Length
1.	"Day Twelve: Trauma"		9:41
2.	"Day Thirteen: Sign"	Lucassen, Heather Findlay	5:06
3.	"Day Fourteen: Pride"		4:46
4.	"Reprise Vigil"		1:09
5.	"Day Fifteen: Betrayal"		5:09
6.	"Reprise School"		1:24
7.	"Day Sixteen: Loser"	Lucassen, Townsend	4:15
8.	"Day Seventeen: Accident?"	Lucassen, Devon Graves	5:16
9.	"Reprise Pain 3"		0:53
10.	"Day Eighteen: Realization"		3:05
11.	"Reprise Trauma"		2:14
12.	"Day Nineteen: Disclosure"		3:49
13.	"Day Twenty: Confrontation"		7:27
14.	"Dream Sequencer System Offline"		1:15

== Personnel ==
=== Cast ===
Returning from The Human Equation

- James LaBrie (Dream Theater) as Me
- Marcela Bovio (Stream of Passion) as Wife
- Irene Jansen as Passion
- Magnus Ekwall (The Quill) as Pride
- Heather Findlay (ex-Mostly Autumn) as Love
- Devon Graves (Deadsoul Tribe / Psychotic Waltz) as Agony
- Eric Clayton (Saviour Machine) as Reason

New

- Jermain "Wudstik" van der Bogt as Best Friend
- Anneke van Giersbergen (ex-The Gathering) as Fear
- Mike Mills (Toehider) as Rage and Father
- Anita van der Hoeven as Mom
- Peter Moltmaker as Doctor
- Nienke Verboom as Nurse
- Katinka van der Harst as Nurse
- Arjen Anthony Lucassen as Forever of the Stars
- Epic Rock Choir - backing vocals

=== Instrumentalists ===
Returning from The Human Equation

- Joost van den Broek (ex-After Forever) - musical director
- Ed Warby (Gorefest, Hail Of Bullets) - drums
- Jeroen Goossens - flutes and woodwinds

New

- Marcel Coenen (Sun Caged) - guitar
- Freek Gielen - guitar
- Johan van Stratum (Stream of Passion) - bass
- Erik van Ittersum - keyboards
- Ruben Wijga (ReVamp) - keyboards
- Ben Mathot - violin
- Maaike Peterse (Kingfisher Sky) - cello

== Charts ==
Chart (2016)	Peak position
Belgian Albums (Ultratop Flanders)	133
Belgian Albums (Ultratop Wallonia)	193
Dutch Albums (Album Top 100)	69
German Albums (Offizielle Top 100)	12
