= On This Perfect Day =

Studio album by Guilt Machine
- Released: 28 August 2009
- Recorded: 2009
- Genre: Progressive metal
- Length: 57:37
- Label: Mascot
- Producer: Arjen Anthony Lucassen

Arjen Anthony Lucassen chronology
| Timeline (2008) | On This Perfect Day (2009) | Victims of the Modern Age (2010) |

On This Perfect Day is the debut album by Dutch singer and musician Arjen Anthony Lucassen's side project Guilt Machine, released in August 2009. The cover of the album was made by Christophe Dessaigne, an artist discovered by Lucassen on Flickr.

== Album information ==
The album features several audio messages sent by fans throughout the songs. The music deals with "the destructive psychology of guilt, regret and the darkest form of secret -- the secrets we hide from ourselves", and the music ranges "from dark and heavy to atmospheric and melancholic", as can be noticed via the preview track published at the band's MySpace page.

== Track listing ==
=== CD (all editions) ===
All music by Lucassen, all lyrics by Lori Linstruth.

| No. | Title | Length |
|---|---|---|
| 1. | "Twisted Coil" | 11:43 |
| 2. | "Leland Street" | 8:03 |
| 3. | "Green and Cream" | 10:32 |
| 4. | "Season of Denial" | 10:22 |
| 5. | "Over" | 6:11 |
| 6. | "Perfection?" | 10:47 |

=== DVD (Limited and Special editions only) ===
Audio Bonus Tracks

1. The Stranger Song (Leonard Cohen cover) - vocals Jasper (4:53)
2. Michelangelo (The 23rd Turnoff cover) - vocals Arjen (3:23)
3. Fan Messages (8:14)
4. Perfection? - guide vocals Arjen (9:37)
5. Twisted Coil - radio edit (4:17)
6. Pull me out of the Dark - radio edit (Green and Cream) (3:36)
7. Over - radio edit (3:56)

Video

1. Trailer "On this Perfect Day" (4:33)
2. Making of the Trailer (3:44)
3. Interview with Guilt Machine (40:03)

== Reception ==
Professional ratings
Review scores
| Source | Rating |
|---|---|
| Dangerdog.com | 4.5/5 stars |
| Metal Storm | 9/10 stars |
| Metalunderground.com | 5/5 stars |
| Progrockmusictalk.com | 4/5 stars |
| Reveletionz.net | 7.5/10 stars |
| Seaoftranquility.org | 4/5 stars |

Since its release, On This Perfect Day has received strongly favorable reviews. Elements that were praised included Steverlinck's voice and the dark atmosphere developed by Lucassen; Metal Storm considers it "the darkest and most melancholic [album] the Dutchman has ever released".

Metal Storm gave the album a rating of 9/10 while stating that the album enjoyed "a promising line-up" and "emotional vocal work that builds up intensity as it goes". Metal Underground remarked that it is "a bold combination of grit, beauty, and strong themes riding the line between progressive metal and rock". RevelationZ considers this album as "overall a great album and another worthy addition to the Lucassen catalogue."

Reviews differ about its similarity with Lucassen's previous works. Metal Storm stated, "from all of his side-projects, this is probably the one closest to Ayreon" and Dangerdog.com calls it "different, but the same". However, Sea of Tranquillity stated, "I'm sure there are going to be plenty of Ayreon fans who might balk at the overabundance of atmospheric and mellow moments here and miss the more upbeat and bombastic elements of Lucassen's other releases".

== Personnel ==
Guilt Machine

- Jasper Steverlinck – lead vocals
- Arjen Anthony Lucassen – rhythm and acoustic guitars, bass, keyboard, mandolin, backing vocals on all tracks, lead vocals on disc 2 track 2
- Lori Linstruth – lead guitar
- Chris Maitland – drums

Guest Musicians

- Ben Mathot – violin
- David Faber – cello

Additional vocals

- Rozemarijn, Stephan Venker, Ripley, Anonymous, Frederic Dessaigne, Rano Zangana, Masumi Hodgson, Jon Mellado, Tomas Ahlroos, Sen, Anonymous, Haydee Garde, Casper Sorensen, Andrew Hyslop, Jardar Folling, Pax, Vinicius TT1, Petho-Devay Ildiko, Claudia M. Luisa Murella – Spoken messages (in order of appearance)

Production

- Arjen Anthony Lucassen – production, mixing
- Christophe Dessaigne – artwork photography
- Jasper van Tilburgh – band photos
- Thomas Ewerhard – logo and layout
- Peter Brussée – mastering
