= The Gentle Storm =

Dutch musical project

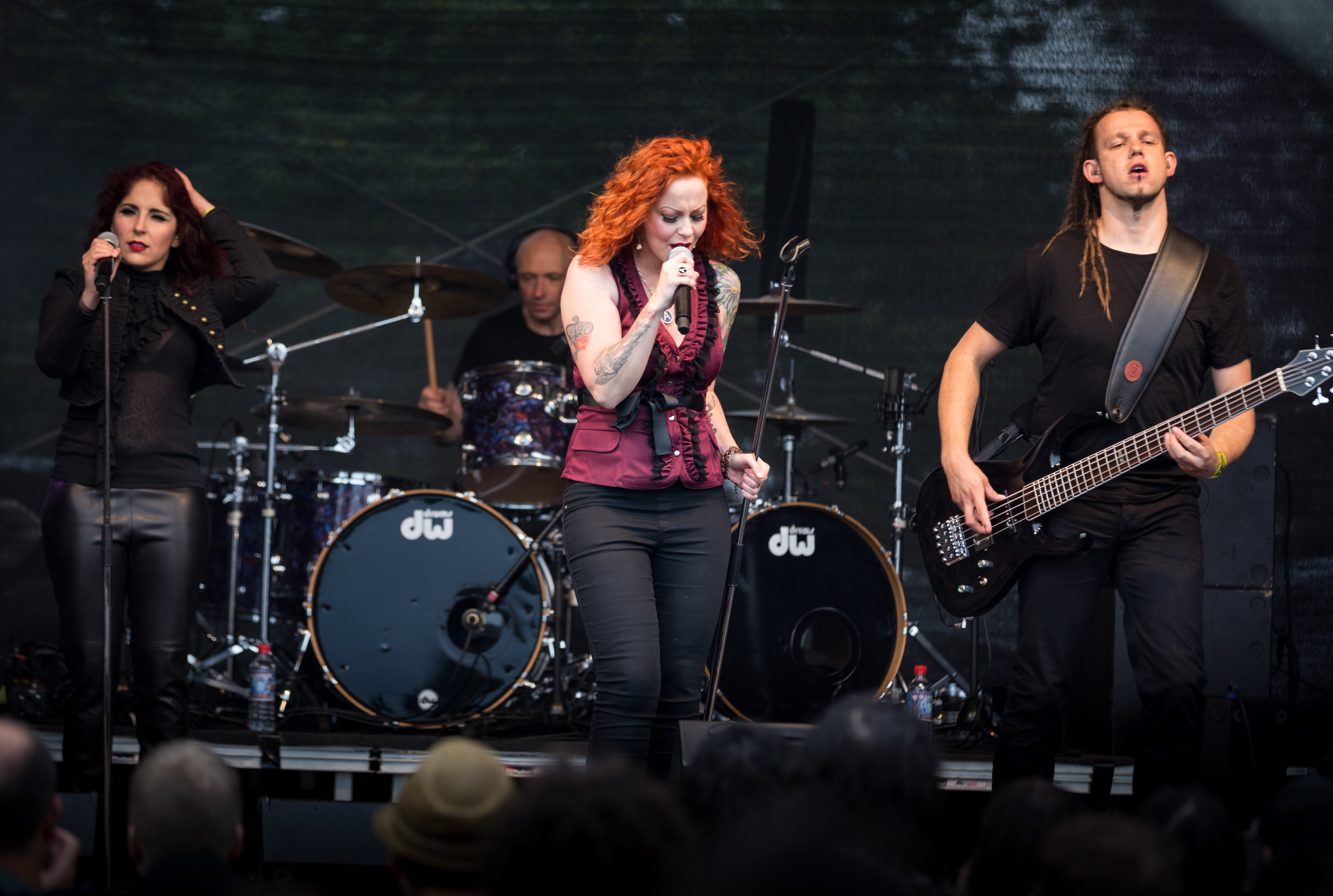
- The Gentle Storm live at the 2015 Wacken Open Air. From left to right: Marcela Bovio, Ed Warby, Anneke van Giersbergen and Johan van Stratum

Background information
- Origin: Netherlands
- Genres: Progressive rock; folk rock; progressive metal; symphonic metal
- Years active: 2014–present (hiatus since 2016)
- Labels: Inside Out Music
- Members: Arjen Anthony Lucassen; Anneke van Giersbergen
- Website: arjenlucassen.com

The Gentle Storm is a Dutch musical project unveiled in 2014 by singer and lyricist Anneke van Giersbergen and composer and musician Arjen Anthony Lucassen, founder and leader of other musical projects such as Star One, Ayreon, Guilt Machine and Ambeon. The duo has previously collaborated in Ayreon albums Into the Electric Castle and 01011001. The project's debut album, The Diary, was released on March 23, 2015, in Europe, and the following day in the US.

== History ==
=== Formation and The Diary (2014–2016) ===
The project was unveiled on 22 April 2014 and was described by Lucassen as "an epic double concept album, a combination of 'classical meets metal' and 'acoustic folk'." Lucassen's most recurrent collaborator Ed Warby will be featured once again on drums, and it will be his very first album featuring a double bass among the instruments. He confirmed that Johan van Stratum from his former band Stream of Passion would play bass on the album. Also, due to "unforeseen problems", Warby had to re-record all his drum parts in one day only. Other former collaborators will be back, such as Joost van den Broek (piano), Ben Mathot (violin) and Maaike Peterse (cello), along with two new guest instrumentalists: Hinse Mutter (double bass) and Jenneke de Jonge (French horn).

On September 2, 2014, Lucassen revealed that his collaboration with van Giersbergen was actually a new band, called The Gentle Storm. He stated that van Giersbergen would perform live with band next year, possibly ruling himself out of live shows.

On October 10, it was announced at The Gentle Storm's official Facebook profile that the album would comprise two CDs with the same songs, but recorded in totally different arrangements. CD 1 was to be "the 'Gentle' album, [...] all acoustic and folky with lots of exotic instruments", while CD2 would be "the 'Storm' album, [...] an all-out, bombastic orchestral metal album". The post also stated that there would be "plenty of progressive elements mixed in". The post invited fans to ask questions, and some of the answers revealed that the album was set for a March 2015 release, that the band would probably continue if the public reception was good enough and that the concept will be "a historic love-story". On 4 November, the album was revealed to be titled The Diary, with a cover art by Alexandra V. Bach, who also drew the art of A War of Our Own by Stream of Passion, another band started by Arjen, but that continued after he left it.

On January 20, 2015, the project released two lyric videos for both versions of the song "Endless Sea".

The Gentle Storm did a small-scale tour in April 2016, after which Lucassen and Van Giersbergen focused on other projects, including together in the Ayreon Universe series of concerts. Van Giersbergen subsequently created the band VUUR, mostly with live members of The Gentle Storm.

== Personnel ==
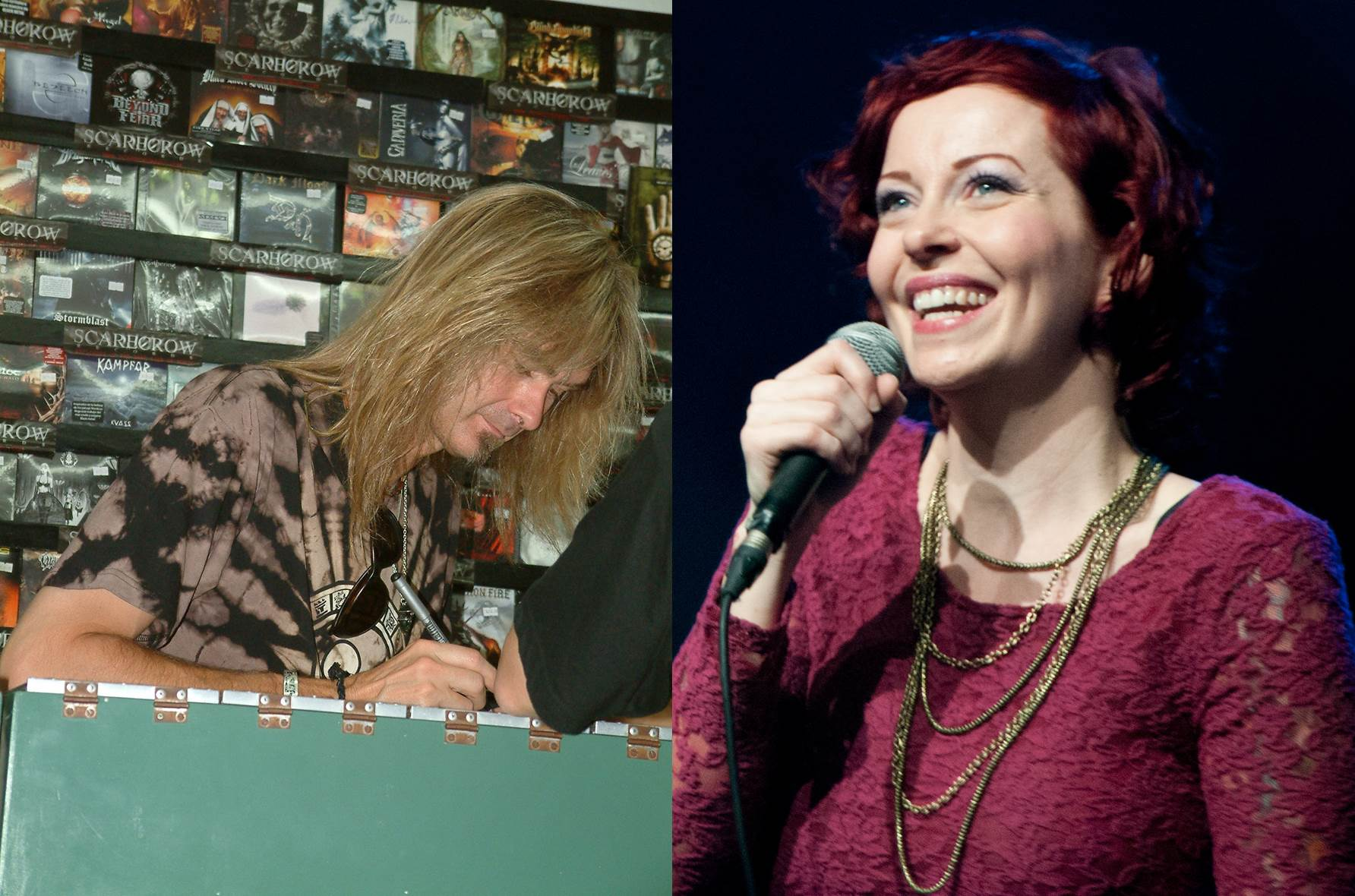
Arjen Anthony Lucassen (left, as of 2006) and Anneke van Giersbergen (right, as of 2014); founders of The Gentle Storm

- Anneke van Giersbergen (ex-The Gathering) - lead vocals
- Arjen Anthony Lucassen (Ayreon, Ambeon, Star One, Guilt Machine, ex-Stream of Passion) - guitars, keyboards, percussion, hammered dulcimer

Additional musicians

- Ed Warby (Gorefest) - drums
- Rob Snijders (Agua de Annique) - percussion
- Johan van Stratum (Stream of Passion) - bass
- Joost van den Broek (Star One, After Forever) - piano
- Timo Somers (Delain, Vengeance) - guitar solo on "Heart of Amsterdam"
- Ben Mathot - violin
- Hinse Mutter - double bass
- Maaike Peterse - cello
- Jenneke de Jonge - French horn
- Jeroen Goossens - wind instruments
- Jack Pisters - sitar and coral
- Micheal Mills - Irish bouzouki
- Remco Helbers - surbahar
- Nathanael van Zuilen - tabla
- "Epic Rock Choir" - choir

Live lineup

- Anneke van Giersbergen - vocals
- Ferry Duijsens (Agua de Annique) - guitars
- Merel Bechtold (Delain, MaYaN, Purest of Pain) - guitars
- Johan van Stratum (Stream of Passion)- bass
- Marcela Bovio (Stream of Passion) - backing vocal
- Joost van den Broek - keyboards
- Ed Warby - drums
- Arjen Anthony Lucassen - acoustic guitar (only on a few dates)
- Ruud Jolie (Within Temptation, Maiden UniteD, For All We Know) - Guitars (during South American tour)
- Koen Herfst - drums (during South American tour)

== Discography ==
- The Diary (2015, studio album)
- The Gentle Storm Exclusive Tour CD (2015, EP)
