= Davy Mickers =

Dutch musician

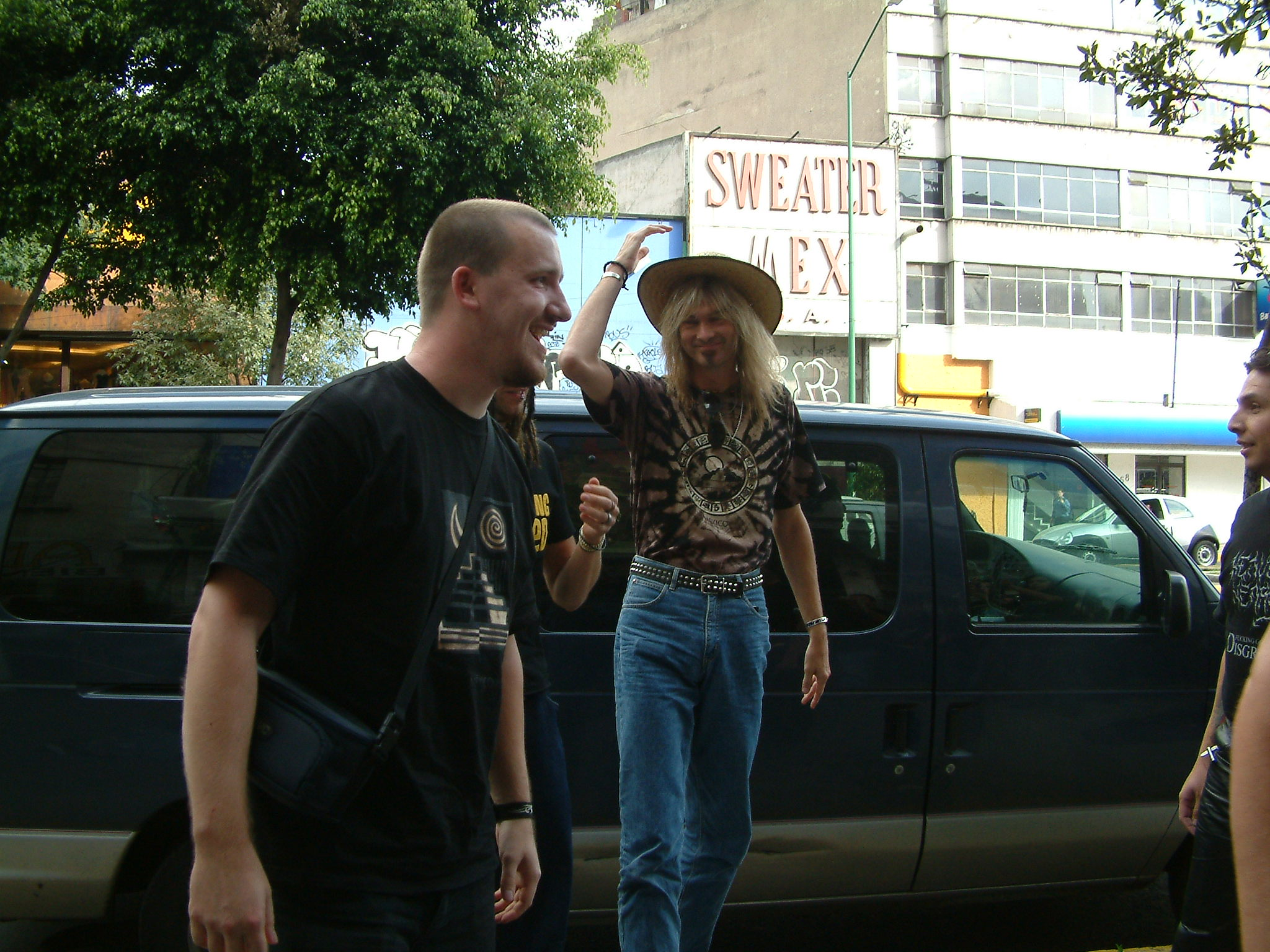
Davy Mickers and Arjen Anthony Lucassen during a signing session in Mexico City, 13 October 2006.

Davy Mickers (born 4 September 1980 in Gemert, Netherlands) was the drummer of progressive metal band Stream of Passion. He also played on the special edition bonus-disc of Ayreon's debut album, The Final Experiment.
