= Stream of Passion =

Dutch progressive metal band

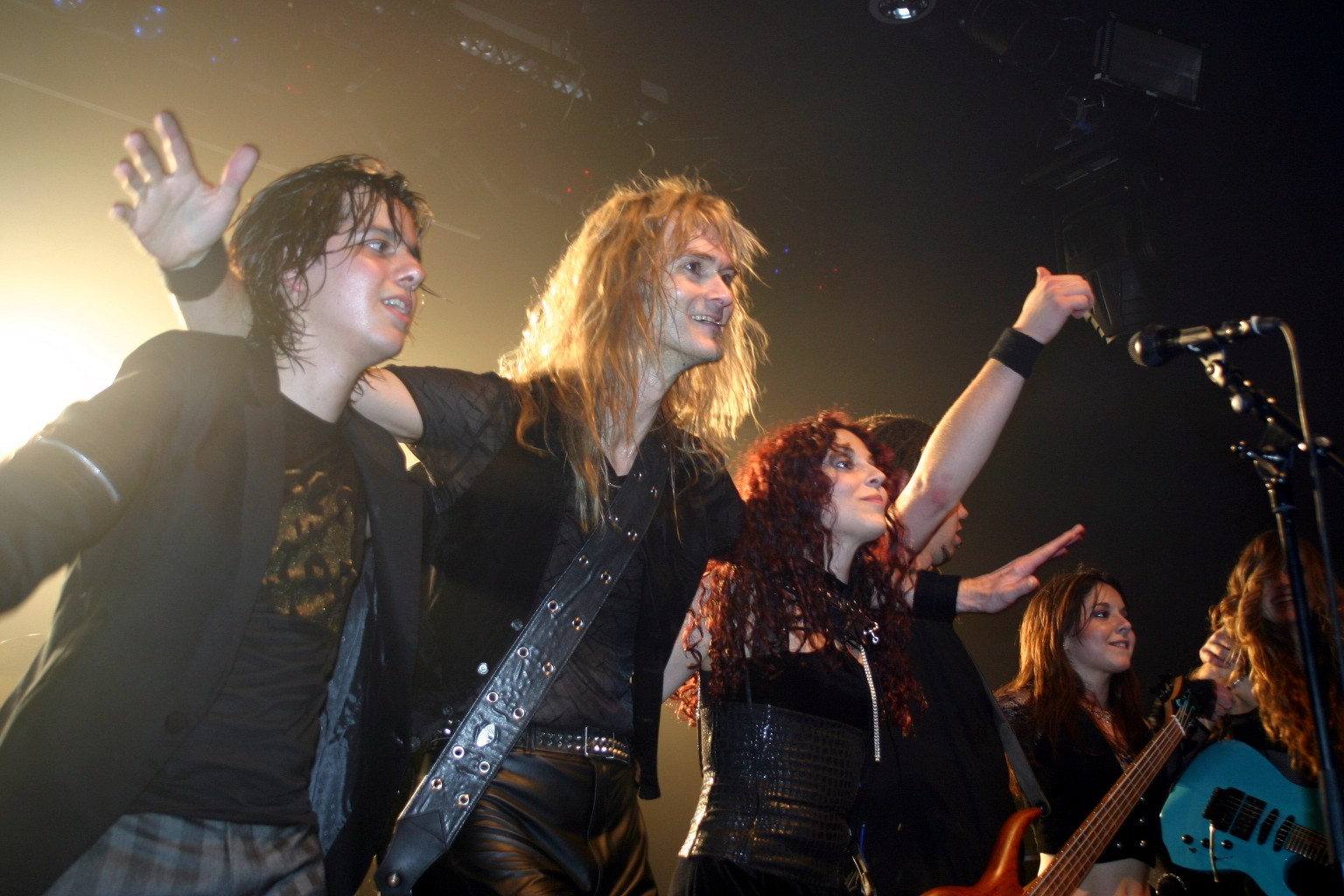
- The original Stream of Passion line-up in 2007. Left to right: Alejandro Millán, Arjen Anthony Lucassen, Marcela Bovio, Johan van Stratum, backing vocalist Diana Bovio, and Lori Linstruth.

Background information
- Origin: Netherlands
- Genres: Progressive metal, symphonic metal, gothic metal
- Years active: 2005–2016; 2022–present
- Labels: InsideOut Music / SPV, Napalm
- Members: Marcela Bovio; Eric Hazebroek; Stephan Schultz; Johan van Stratum; Jeffrey Revet; Martijn Peters
- Past members: Arjen Anthony Lucassen; Lori Linstruth; Alejandro Millán; Davy Mickers
- Website: streamofpassion.com

Stream of Passion is a Dutch progressive metal band with symphonic and gothic influences founded by guitarist and composer Arjen Anthony Lucassen and Mexican singer, violinist, and lyricist Marcela Bovio. They have released four studio albums.

The band was founded with Lucassen intending on leaving early on to focus on other projects, which he did in 2007 alongside guitarist Lori Linstruth, and keyboardist Alejandro Millán; Bovio, bassist Johan van Stratum and producer Joost van den Broek handled composition duties afterwards. After keeping a steady line-up since 2009, the band announced in April 2016 that they would disband, wanting to end on a high note rather than letting the interest and inspiration fade away, after a live album entitled Memento and a final show on 28 December 2016; they reformed with the same line-up in 2022, releasing an EP of original material the next year.

== History ==
Lucassen and Bovio had previously collaborated in Ayreon's album The Human Equation, for which Bovio (then in band Elfonía) was selected by Lucassen via an internet female singing contest. Lucassen then decided to create a new band with her as lead vocalist, and selected other little-known musicians to form the rest of the band: bass player Johan van Stratum, keyboardist Alejandro Millán (from Elfonía as well), guitarist Lori Linstruth, and drummer Davy Mickers. Because the musicians in the band lived thousands of miles apart, Lucassen composed the group's 2005 debut album, Embrace the Storm, over the Internet, with Bovio writing all the lyrics. A live album, Live in the Real World, featuring songs from Lucassen's other projects Ayreon and Star One, was released the following year.

In 2007, half of the Stream of Passion's line-up decided to leave: Lucassen left to make them continue their own career as he had planned since the creation, while Linstruth and Millán also decided to quit. The three were respectively replaced by Hazebroek, Schultz, and Revet. After the release in 2009 of the band's first album without Lucassen on composition, The Flame Within, Mickers decided to leave the band, with Bovio and van Stratum being the only original members left. He was replaced by Peters who featured on the band's third album in 2011, Darker Days.

In 2012 Stream of Passion left Napalm Records and decided to become an independent band, launching an Indiegogo campaign to finance their fourth full studio album. The new album, A War of Our Own, was released on 18 April 2014.

In April 2016 the band announced via Facebook that they would be separating at the end of the year, saying "Over the past eleven years we've had the time of our lives playing in stages all over the world and sharing moments of joy on stage. But all good things come to an end, and we feel it's time to move on and search for new musical challenges. We're proud of everything we've achieved, with your help, and we want to end the band history on a high note instead of losing focus, interest and drive. Before parting ways as a band we will perform a few goodbye shows; we also want to record a DVD to serve as a memento of the good times we've had. [...] Once again, we'd like to express our eternal gratitude for the support you've given us all these years. All of us will continue to make music, one way or the other; so we still hope to see you soon on a stage near you. Thank you for being part of the wonderful adventure that has been Stream of Passion!"

The band released a live album entitled Memento and performed a final show on 28 December 2016.

After Stream of Passion disbanded, bassist Johan van Stratum and singer Marcela Bovio became part of the line-up for progressive metal band VUUR, but Bovio left the band before its debut release after she and fellow VUUR singer Anneke van Giersbergen realized they wanted to approach the vocals in different ways.

In October 2022 the band announced that they were reforming for a show in September 2023. They later announced a second show to be played the same month, as well as the upcoming release of an EP of newly recorded material. The EP Beautiful Warrior was released on September 9, 2023.

== Band members ==
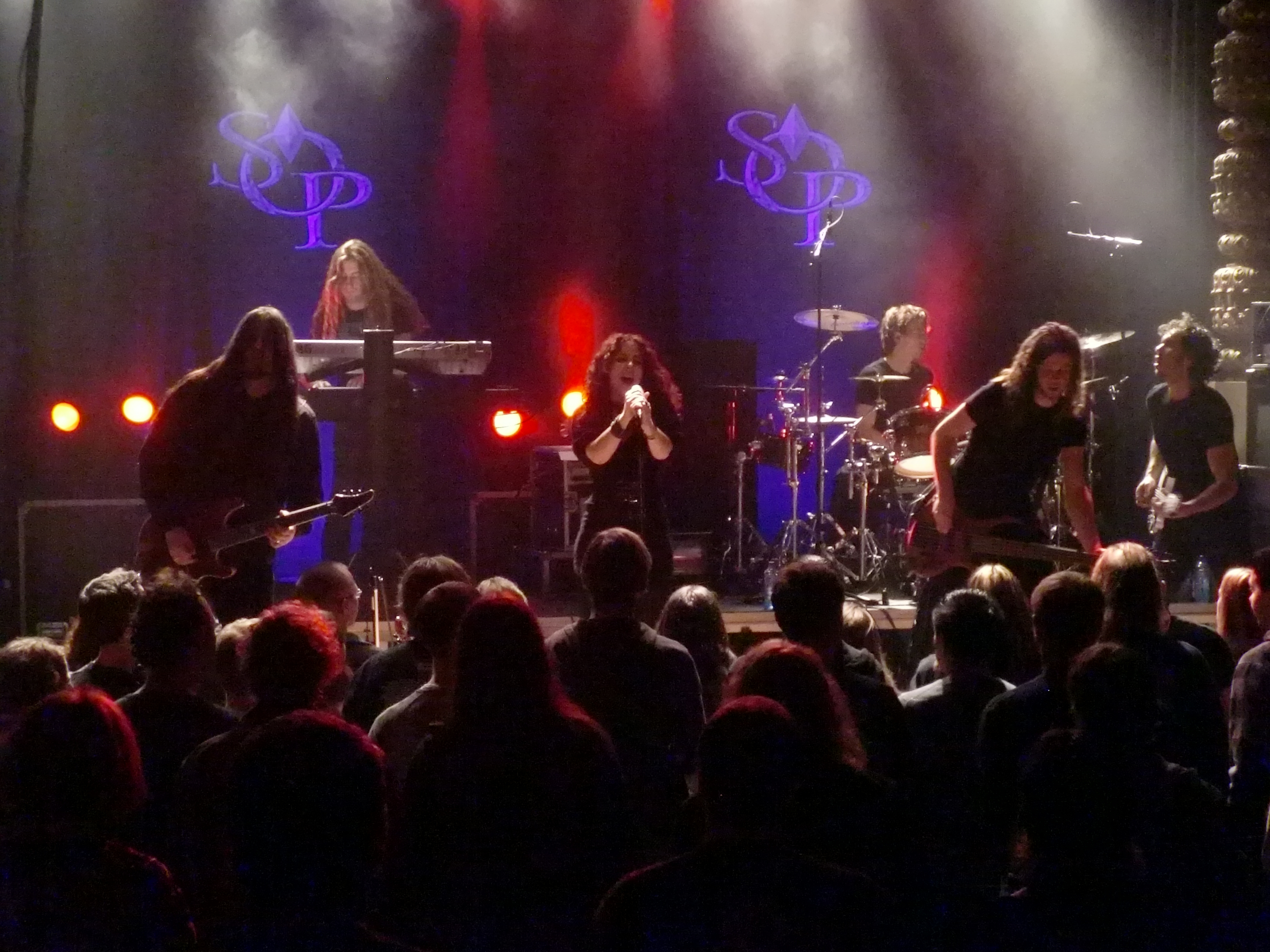
Stream of Passion performing in 2009.

Current

- Marcela Bovio – lead vocals, violin (2005–2016, 2022–present)
- Johan van Stratum – bass (2005–2016, 2022–present)
- Eric Hazebroek – lead/rhythm guitar (2007–2016, 2022–present)
- Stephan Schultz – lead/rhythm guitar (2007–2016, 2022–present)
- Jeffrey Revet – keyboards, synthesizers, piano (2007–2016, 2022–present)
- Martijn Peters – drums (2009–2016, 2022–present)

Former

- Arjen Anthony Lucassen – lead/rhythm guitar, keyboards, backing vocals (2005–2007)
- Lori Linstruth – lead/rhythm guitar (2005–2007)
- Alejandro Millán – keyboards, piano, live backing vocals (2005–2007)
- Davy Mickers – drums (2005–2009)

Session

- Damian Wilson – vocals, acoustic guitar (live, 2006)
- Diana Bovio – backing vocals (live, 2006–2007)
- André Borgman – drums (live, 2009)

== Discography ==
Studio albums

- Embrace the Storm (2005)
- The Flame Within (2009)
- Darker Days (2011)
- A War of Our Own (2014)

EPs

- Beautiful Warrior (2023)

Live albums

- Live in the Real World (2006) (CD and DVD)
- Memento (2016) (DVD)

Singles

- "Out in the Real World" (2006) – No. 49* NL Singles Top 100
- "I Have a Right" (2015) – from A Tribute to Sonata Arctica
- "The Hunter" (2022)
