= 01011001 – Live Beneath the Waves =

Live album by Ayreon
- Released: 17 May 2024
- Recorded: 15–17 September 2023
- Genre: Progressive metal, progressive rock
- Length: 2:14:48
- Label: Mascot Label Group / Music Theories
- Producer: Arjen Anthony Lucassen

Ayreon live chronology
Electric Castle Live and Other Tales (2020)	01011001 – Live Beneath the Waves (2024)

01011001 – Live Beneath the Waves is a live album by Arjen Lucassen's progressive rock/metal rock opera project Ayreon, released on 17 May 2024. It is a live version of the 2008 concept album 01011001, which was filmed during a series of five concerts performed in September 2023 in the 013 venue in Tilburg, Netherlands.

== Background and recording ==
After performing the previous Ayreon live album Electric Castle Live and Other Tales in 2019, plans were made for a new set of concerts to be held in 2021. These plans were delayed due to the effects of the COVID-19 pandemic. In 2022, unsure about post-pandemic demand for the shows, Arjen Lucassen announced three 01011001 – Live Beneath the Waves shows to be performed on 15–17 September 2023. After the initial three shows sold out in minutes, two matinée shows were added, for a total of five shows played in three days. The evening performance of the Sunday 17 September show was the main recording used for the live album.

Of the seventeen singers on the original album, twelve returned to perform the live shows. In addition, four additional guest lead vocalists and three backup singers completed the vocalist lineup. As the singers on the album do not have unique characters they perform, vocal parts were not strictly distributed based on the performers of the original album.

After performing the album in its entirety, the cast performed several songs from other Lucassen albums: "This Human Equation" from the 2020 Ayreon album Transitus, "Fate of Man" from the Star One album Revel in Time and "The Day That the World Breaks Down" from the Ayreon album The Source.

== Track listing ==
All tracks are written by Arjen Lucassen, except melodies by Anneke van Giersbergen for "We Are Forever" (Note: Section of "Age of Shadows") and "Waking Dreams" and melodies by Jonas Renkse for "We Are Forever", "Waking Dreams", "Unnatural Selection", "2085". (Note: Section of "The Sixth Extinction")

No.	Title	Lead vocalists (Note: In order of appearance)	Length
1.	"March of the Machines" (from The Source)		2:45
2.	"Age of Shadows"	Tom S. Englund, Michael Mills, Daniel Gildenlöw, Hansi Kürsch, Brittney Slayes, Jonas Renkse, Anneke van Giersbergen, John Jaycee Cuijpers	10:26
3.	"Comatose"	Van Giersbergen, Damian Wilson	4:22
4.	"Liquid Eternity"	Renkse, Gildenlöw, Maggy Luyten, Wilson, Englund, Slayes	7:45
5.	"Connect the Dots"	Arjen Lucassen	4:30
6.	"Beneath the Waves"	Gildenlöw, Wilson, Van Giersbergen, Mills, Slayes, Kürsch, Englund, Cuijpers	8:25
7.	"Newborn Race"	Gildenlöw, Slayes, Englund, Renkse, Wilson, Kürsch, Cuijpers	8:03
8.	"Ride the Comet"	Renkse, Slayes, Englund, Luyten	4:45
9.	"Web of Lies"	Simone Simons, Phideaux Xavier (Note: Digital recording)	2:47
10.	"The Fifth Extinction"	Van Giersbergen, Wilson, Mills, Cuijpers, Englund, Gildenlöw, Kürsch, Renkse, Slayes	10:43
11.	"Waking Dreams"	Renkse, Van Giersbergen	6:35
12.	"The Truth Is in Here"	Lucassen, Liselotte Hegt	5:19
13.	"Unnatural Selection"	Englund, Mills, Cuijpers, Wilson, Kürsch, Renkse, Irene Jansen, Marcela Bovio	7:23
14.	"River of Time"	Kürsch, Wilson	4:06
15.	"E=mc^{2}"	Wudstik, Marjan Welman	5:19
16.	"The Sixth Extinction"	Englund, Mills, Kürsch, Gildenlöw, Renkse, Slayes, Wilson, Cuijpers, Van Giersbergen, Hegt, Lucassen, Luyten, Simons, Welman, Wudstik	12:12
17.	"Speech"		6:50
18.	"This Human Equation" (from Transitus)	Simons	3:54
19.	"Fate of Man" (from Revel in Time)	Slayes	5:40
20.	"The Day That the World Breaks Down" (from The Source)	Wilson, Gildenlöw, Jan Willem Ketelaers, Simons, Luyten, Cuijpers, Kürsch, Mills, Englund, Van Giersbergen, Bovio, Jansen	12:59

== Personnel ==
Vocalists

- Tom S. Englund (Evergrey)
- Daniel Gildenlöw (Pain of Salvation)
- Hansi Kürsch (Blind Guardian)
- Jonas Renkse (Katatonia)
- Anneke van Giersbergen (The Gentle Storm, VUUR, ex-The Gathering)
- Maggy Luyten (Beautiful Sin)
- Simone Simons (Epica)
- Phideaux Xavier
- Arjen Lucassen
- Liselotte Hegt
- Marjan Welman
- Wudstik

Guest vocalists

- Michael Mills (Toehider)
- Damian Wilson (Headspace, ex-Threshold)
- Brittney Slayes (Unleash the Archers)
- John Jaycee Cuijpers (Praying Mantis)

Backing vocals

- Marcela Bovio (Stream of Passion, Mayan)
- Irene Jansen
- Jan Willem Ketelaers

Instrumentalists

- Joost van den Broek – keyboards
- Ed Warby – drums
- Johan van Stratum – bass
- Timo Somers – electric and acoustic guitar
- Marcel Coenen – guitar
- Ben Mathot – violin
- Jeroen Goossens – flute
- Jurriaan Westerveld – cello

== Charts ==
Chart (2024)	Peak position
Dutch Albums (Album Top 100)	2
Scottish Albums (OCC)	29
UK Rock & Metal Albums (OCC)	4
UK Independent Albums (OCC)	18
