= Revel in Time =

Studio album by Star One
- Released: 18 February 2022
- Genre: Progressive metal
- Length: 66:42
- Label: InsideOut
- Producer: Arjen Anthony Lucassen

Star One chronology
Victims of the Modern Age (2010)	Revel in Time (2022)

Arjen Anthony Lucassen chronology
Transitus (2020)	Revel in Time (2022)	Golden Age of Music (2023)

Singles from Revel in Time
- 1. "Lost Children of the Universe" Released: 27 October 2021; 2. "Fate of Man" Released: 17 November 2021; 3. "Prescient" Released: 17 December 2021; 4. "Revel in Time" Released: 19 January 2022

Revel in Time is the third studio album by Arjen Anthony Lucassen's progressive metal project/supergroup Star One, released via Inside Out on 18 February 2022.

As with previous Star One albums, here Lucassen focuses on the "metal" side of his main project Ayreon while dispensing with the latter's typical acoustic and folk elements. He saw more hard rock elements on this album. The album's lyrics are inspired by science fiction movies and TV series involving time manipulation, such as time loops and time travel. The title is inspired by a quote from Blade Runner.

Unlike previous albums, however, in which the same quartet of four guest vocalists (Damian Wilson, Dan Swanö, Floor Jansen and Russell Allen) would participate in the main songs, Revel in Time features several different vocalists, one for each track, including Roy Khan, Tony Martin, Jeff Scott Soto, Joe Lynn Turner and the four aforementioned ones. This was partly due to the international travel restrictions caused by the COVID-19 pandemic. It also features guitar and keyboard solos by guest instrumentalists, such as Jens Johansson, Steve Vai, Ron "Bumblefoot" Thal and Adrian Vandenberg.

== Release and promotion ==
The first song and video to be released was the epic closing track "Lost Children of the Universe". The song appears on the album sung by either Roy Khan (CD 1) or Tony Martin (CD 2), but the video is a special version combining both their performances. It was followed on 17 November by "Fate of Man", featuring Brittney Slayes (Unleash the Archers) and Michael Romeo (Symphony X). The third single and video, "Prescient", features Ross Jennings and Micheal Mills and was released on 17 December 2021. The title-track was released as the last single and video on 19 January 2022, featuring Brandon Yeagley.

The album was released as a 2-CD digipak, deluxe 3-CD+Blu-ray artbook, 180 gram gatefold 2-LP. The artbook comes with a Blu-ray with 5.1 mix high-resolution audio version and behind the scenes footage.

== Reception ==
Professional ratings
Review scores
Source	Rating
Metal Injection	9
Sonic Perspectives	9.3

Metal Injection's Jordan Blum said Lucassen "and his troupe continue to do remarkably enticing and creative things" and commented that "it may take half a dozen deep listens for a few songs to reveal their specialties and set themselves apart from the pack", concluding that the album is "a superb return from progressive metal's greatest composer, as well as one of the finest genre albums you'll hear this year".

In Tuonela Magazine, editor Laureline Tilkin considered Revel in Time "the most dynamic" of the three Star One albums, besides saying it overall "has a lighter character". She ultimately called it "an instant prog classic that everyone who is remotely interested in Arjen Lucassen's work should listen to".

Writing for Sonic Perspectives, John Kokel said "for not being an actual Ayreon album, this may be Arjen's best Ayreon album since The Human Equation. He reasoned that comparing it with Ayreon albums would be more fair than doing the same with Star One albums since this effort "seems to be the best, most diverse, and best produced of the Star One albums".

== Track listing ==
All lyrics are written by Arjen Anthony Lucassen except "Prescient" by Micheal Mills, and "Lost Children of the Universe," Latin text by Jaap Toorenaar and Gjalt Lucassen.; all music is composed by Arjen Anthony Lucassen

CD 1
No.	Title	Vocalist	Length
1.	"Fate of Man" (inspired by The Terminator)	Brittney Slayes	5:29
2.	"28 Days (Till the End of Time)" (inspired by Donnie Darko)	Russell Allen	7:20
3.	"Prescient" (inspired by Primer)	Micheal Mills, Ross Jennings	6:34
4.	"Back from the Past" (inspired by Back to the Future)	Jeff Scott Soto	4:50
5.	"Revel in Time" (inspired by Bill & Ted's Excellent Adventure)	Brandon Yeagley	4:37
6.	"The Year of '41" (inspired by The Final Countdown)	Joe Lynn Turner	6:20
7.	"Bridge of Life" (inspired by Frequency)	Damian Wilson	5:13
8.	"Today Is Yesterday" (inspired by Groundhog Day)	Dan Swanö	5:46
9.	"A Hand on the Clock" (inspired by Source Code)	Floor Jansen	5:51
10.	"Beyond the Edge of it All" (inspired by Sapphire & Steel)	John Jaycee Cuijpers	4:52
11.	"Lost Children of the Universe" (inspired by Interstellar)	Roy Khan	9:46
Total length:			66:42

CD 2 (alternate versions with different vocalists)
No.	Title	Vocalist	Length
1.	"Fate of Man" (inspired by The Terminator)	Marcela Bovio	5:29
2.	"28 Days (Till the End of Time)" (inspired by Donnie Darko)	John Jaycee Cuijpers	7:20
3.	"Prescient" (inspired by Primer)	Will Shaw	6:34
4.	"Back from the Past" (inspired by Back to the Future)	John Jaycee Cuijpers	4:50
5.	"Revel in Time" (inspired by Bill & Ted's Excellent Adventure)	John Jaycee Cuijpers	4:37
6.	"The Year of '41" (inspired by The Final Countdown)	Alessandro Del Vecchio	6:20
7.	"Bridge of Life" (inspired by Frequency)	Wilmer Waarbroek	5:13
8.	"Today Is Yesterday" (inspired by Groundhog Day)	Arjen Anthony Lucassen	5:46
9.	"A Hand on the Clock" (inspired by Source Code)	Marcela Bovio, Irene Jansen (verses)	5:51
10.	"Beyond the Edge of it All" (inspired by Sapphire & Steel)	Mike Andersson	4:52
11.	"Lost Children of the Universe" (inspired by Interstellar)	Tony Martin	9:46
Total length:			66:42

== Personnel ==
Star One

- Arjen Anthony Lucassen – guitars, bass, keyboards, vocals on "Today Is Yesterday" (alternate version), guitar solo on "Beyond the Edge of It All"
- Erik van Ittersum – Solina Strings
- Ed Warby – drums
- Russell Allen (Symphony X, Adrenaline Mob) - vocalist on "28 Days (Till the End of Time)"
- Damian Wilson (Headspace, ex-Threshold) vocalist on "Bridge of Life"
- Dan Swanö (Edge of Sanity, Nightingale, Witherscape) vocalist on "Today Is Yesterday"
- Floor Jansen (Nightwish, Northward, ReVamp, After Forever) vocalist on "Hand on the Clock"
- Marcela Bovio – backing vocals
- Irene Jansen – backing vocals

Guest instrumentalists

- Michael Romeo (Symphony X) – guitar solo on "Fate of Man" (both versions)
- Timo Somers (Delain) – guitar solo on "28 Days (Till the End of Time)" (both versions)
- Ron "Bumblefoot" Thal (Sons of Apollo, ex-Guns 'N' Roses) – guitar solo on "Back from the Past" (both versions)
- Adrian Vandenberg (Vandenberg, Whitesnake) – guitar solo on "Revel in Time" (both versions)
- Jens Johansson (Stratovarius, Cain's Offering, ex-Rainbow, ex-Yngwie Malmsteen) — keyboard solo on "The Year of '41"
- Joel Hoekstra (Whitesnake, Trans-Siberian Orchestra, ex-Night Ranger) - guitar solo on "The Year of '41"
- Alessandro Del Vecchio – keyboard solo on "The Year of '41" (alternate version)
- Marcel Singor – guitar solo on "Today is Yesterday" (both versions)
- Lisa Bella Donna – Moog solo on "Today is Yesterday" (both versions)
- Joost van den Broek (After Forever) – keyboard solo on "A Hand on the Clock" (both versions)
- Steve Vai – guitar solo on "Lost Children of the Universe" (both versions)

Guest vocalists

- Brittney Slayes (Unleash the Archers) on "Fate of Man"
- Micheal Mills (Toehider) on "Prescient"
- Ross Jennings (Haken, Novena) on "Prescient"
- Jeff Scott Soto (Sons of Apollo, ex-Yngwie Malmsteen, ex-Axel Rudi Pell) on "Back from the Past"
- Brandon Yeagley (Crobot) on "Revel in Time"
- Joe Lynn Turner (ex-Rainbow, ex-Yngwie Malmsteen, ex-Deep Purple) on "The Year of '41"
- John Jaycee Cuijpers (Praying Mantis) on "Beyond the Edge of It All", "28 Days (Till the End of Time)" (alternative version), "Back From the Past" (alternate version), "Revel in Time" (alternate version)
- Roy Khan (Conception, ex-Kamelot) on "Lost Children of the Universe"
- Hellscore Choir – on "Lost Children of the Universe (both versions)
- Marcela Bovio (Mayan, Stream of Passion, ex-Elfonía, ex-VUUR) on "Fate of Man" (alternative version) and "A Hand on the Clock" (alternative version)
- Will Shaw on "Prescient" (alternative version)
- Alessandro Del Vecchio on "The Year of '41" (alternative version)
- Wilmer Waarbroek on "Bridge of Life" (alternative version)
- Irene Jansen on "A Hand on the Clock" (alternative version)
- Mike Andersson on "Beyond the Edge of It All" (alternate version)
- Tony Martin (ex-Black Sabbath) on "Lost Children of the Universe" (alternate version)

Technical personnel

- Jef Bertels – artwork

== Charts ==
Chart performance for Revel in Time
Chart (2022)	Peak position
Austrian Albums (Ö3 Austria)	50
Belgian Albums (Ultratop Flanders)	5
Dutch Albums (Album Top 100)	1
Finnish Albums (Suomen virallinen lista)	18
German Albums (Offizielle Top 100)	6
Scottish Albums (OCC)	51
Swiss Albums (Schweizer Hitparade)	7
UK Album Downloads (OCC)	77
UK Rock & Metal Albums (OCC)	7
