= Star One (band) =

Dutch progressive metal band

- Origin: Netherlands
- Genres: Progressive metal, heavy metal, space rock
- Years active: 2002–present
- Label: InsideOut Music
- Members: Arjen Anthony Lucassen; Russell Allen; Damian Wilson; Dan Swanö; Floor Jansen; Peter Vink; Ed Warby; Gary Wehrkamp; Joost van den Broek
- Website: starone.com

Star One (also referred to as Arjen Anthony Lucassen's Star One) is a Dutch progressive metal supergroup/side-project of Arjen Anthony Lucassen of Ayreon fame.

The band has released three albums to date: their first in 2002, their second in 2010, and most recently a third in 2022, plus a live album in 2003, and features four different singers: Russell Allen (Symphony X), Damian Wilson (Threshold, Headspace, Arena), Dan Swanö (Edge of Sanity, Nightingale), and Floor Jansen (After Forever, ReVamp, Nightwish).

Unlike Ayreon, the Star One albums do not follow one storyline; instead, each song is a different story with a sci-fi concept, most of the tracks based on existing movies and series. The band takes its name from the second season finale of Blake's 7. The band includes four singers alternating in all the songs, not including Lucassen, who sings occasionally, plays all guitars and keyboards and writes and composes all the songs. The third studio album deviates from this, having a different guest singer on each track.

== History ==
=== Origins and first album (2002–2003) ===
Star One was born out of the remnants of an abandoned collaboration between Lucassen and Iron Maiden frontman Bruce Dickinson. Dickinson proposed the idea and the two exchanged ideas and put together four songs, Lucassen writing the music and Dickinson writing the lyrics. The project was abandoned however after Lucassen mentioned the project on the internet and Dickinson's manager called off negotiations. Instead of completely abandoning the material that had already been produced, Lucassen decided to put his own lyrics to the music and created Star One.

When asked on the "Ask Arjen Anything" channel of communication if there would be another Star One album, Lucassen simply stated "Probably". However, he later declared:

"Space Metal was really magic. I am afraid that I will fail to capture the same atmosphere and actually ruin it! I am actually against sequels; you cannot repeat the same atmosphere and feeling like you had with the first album."

=== Second album (2009–2010) ===
In an interview conducted by Ragnarok Radio in October 2009 Arjen stated Star One is "definitely not dead."

In October 2009 in another interview, with Lebmetal.com, Arjen said he was working on what might become another Star One album: "In the meantime I will be working on a new, heavier album. Possible a new Star One album, but then again things never work out the way I plan them", and in a November 2009 interview with Lagrossradio.com, Arjen stated that he was definitely working on a new Star One album and that he had already written and recorded a song.

In March 2010, a "demo listening party" was held where several members of the arjenlucassen.com messageboard were allowed to listen to the first (only instrumental) demos for the new Star One album. In August of the same year, Arjen revealed the title of this second album, Victims of the Modern Age, and announced that it was ready. The album was released in October 2010.

In a Q&A in August 2018, Lucassen stated that returning to Star One was "always an option, it's the same as with all my other projects. [...] For Star One, I have to be in a certain mood, because it's based on guitar riffs." He confirmed that his next project would not be a Star One album, as his latest work, the Ayreon album The Source, was already heavy-oriented, and stated that if a new Star One album came to be, it would probably be with different singers.

=== Third album (2020–present) ===
After releasing the Ayreon album Transitus in September 2020, Lucassen stated in several comments in social media that he was working on a third Star One album. On 9 February 2021 he published a video announcement, confirming this, and said that music is basically ready at this point and he's working on lyrics at the moment. He also promised a "big change": instead of having four singers for the whole album, each track will have its own separate singer. In October 2021, it was announced that the name of album would be Revel in Time along with the release date. The album was released on 18 February 2022.

== Music ==
The music of Star One is heavier than that of Lucassen's progressive rock/metal opera project Ayreon, drawing influences from 1970s space rock and blending them with modern progressive metal. Lucassen explained that the songwriting was different in that Star One songs are built on guitar riffs whereas Ayreon songs stem primarily off chord arrangements. However, similarities still exist mainly in the song arrangements, the multi-layered vocals, and the use of synthesizers and Hammond organs as part of the main instrumentation.

== Members ==
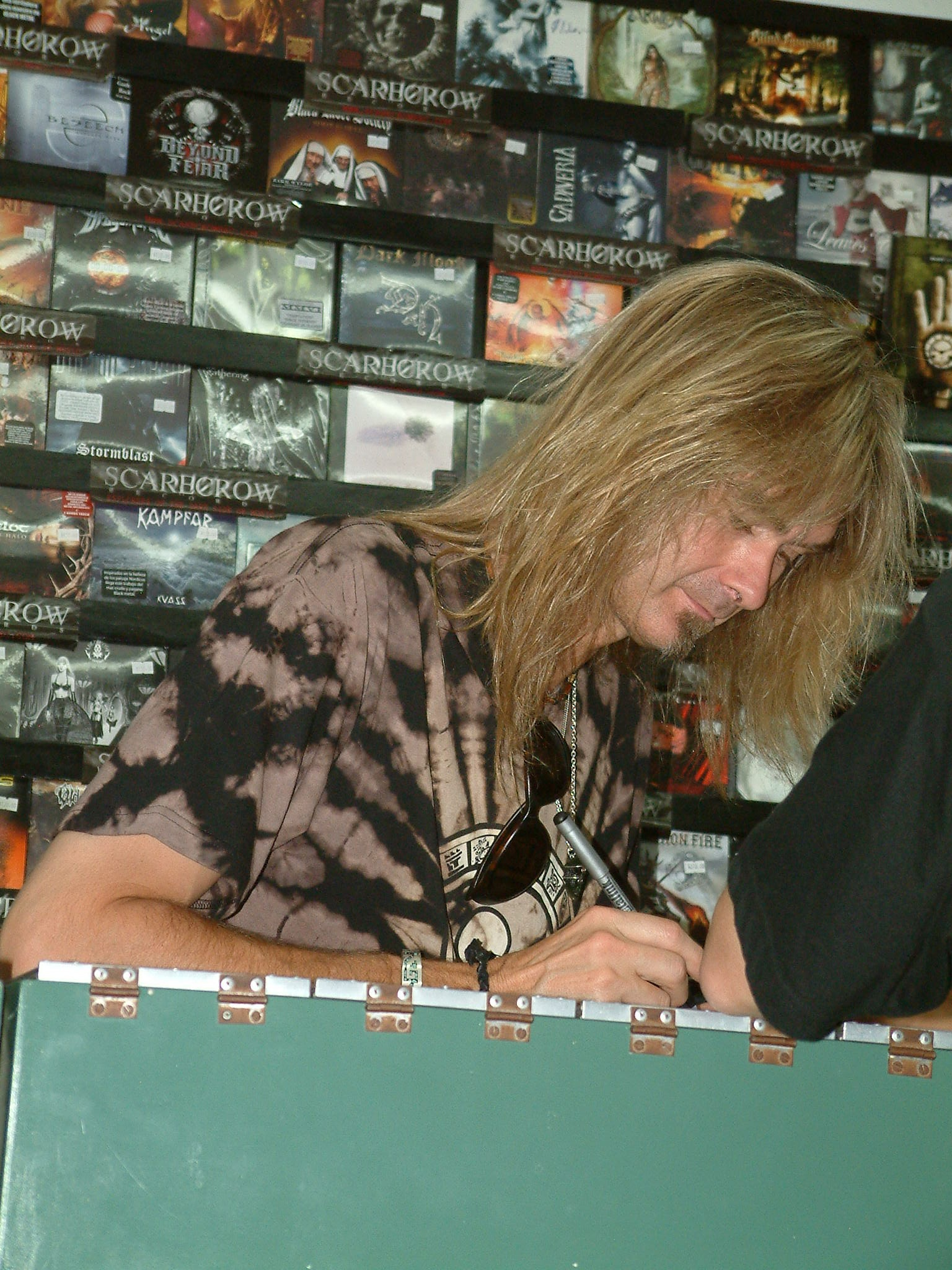
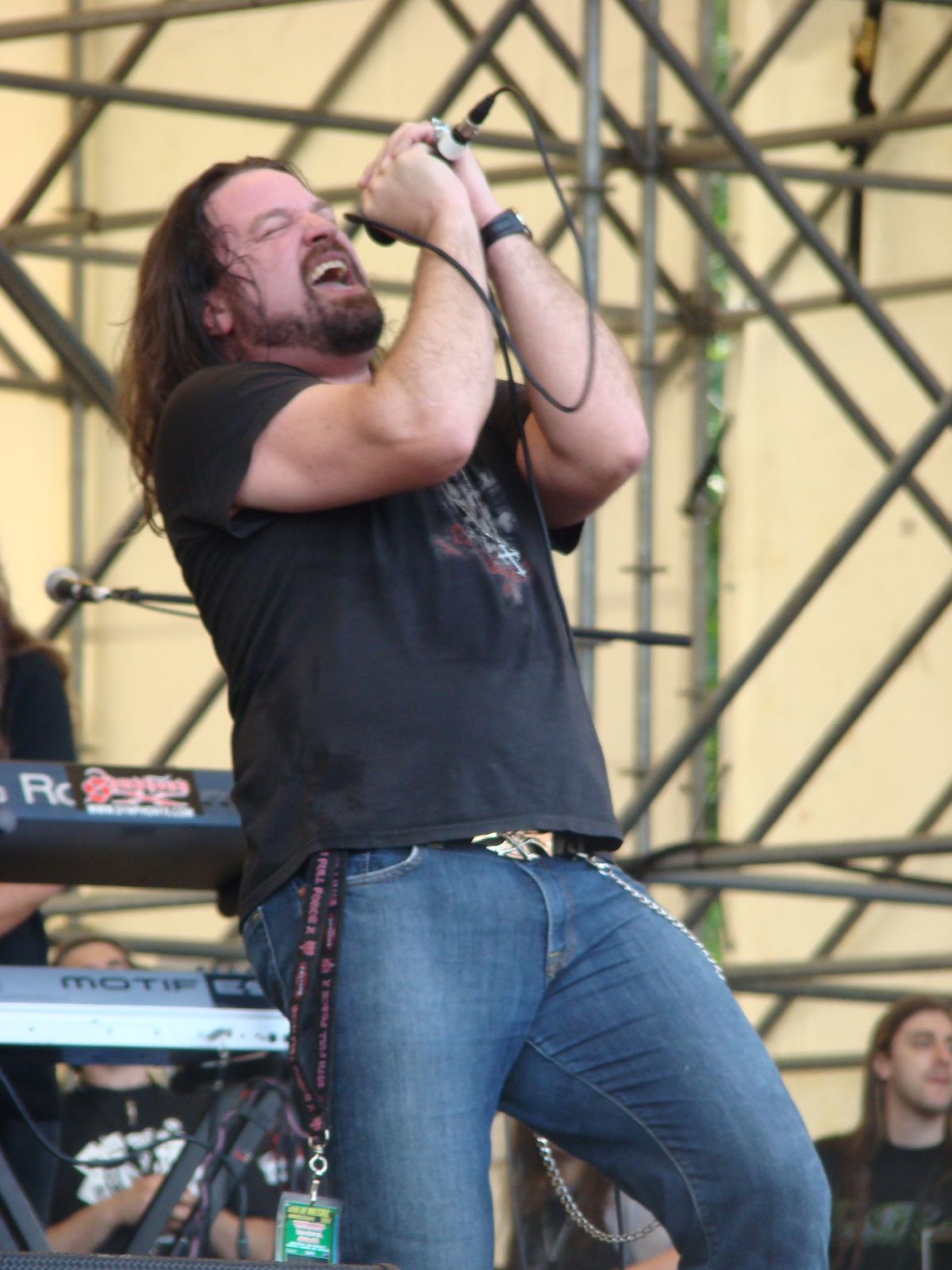
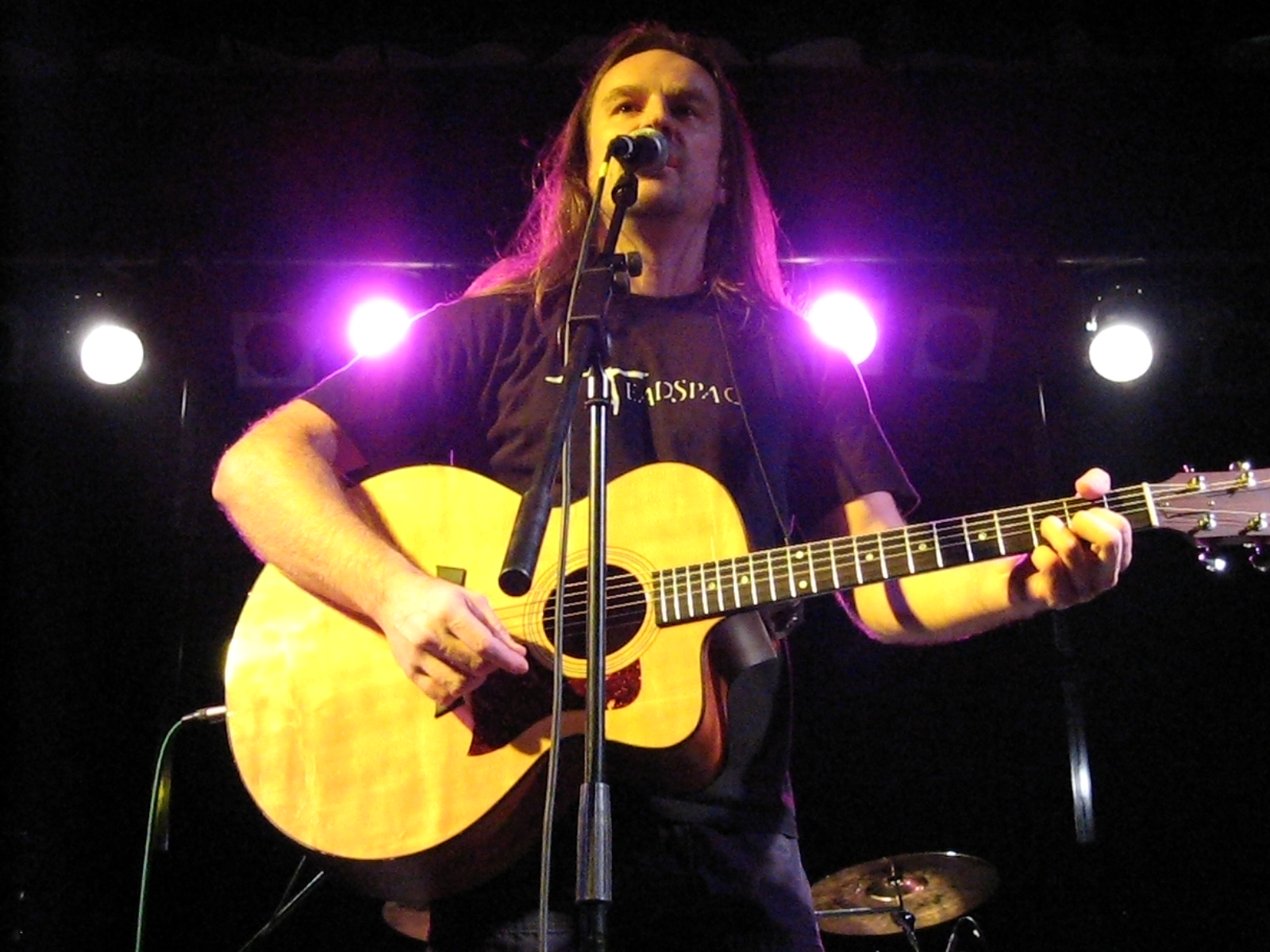
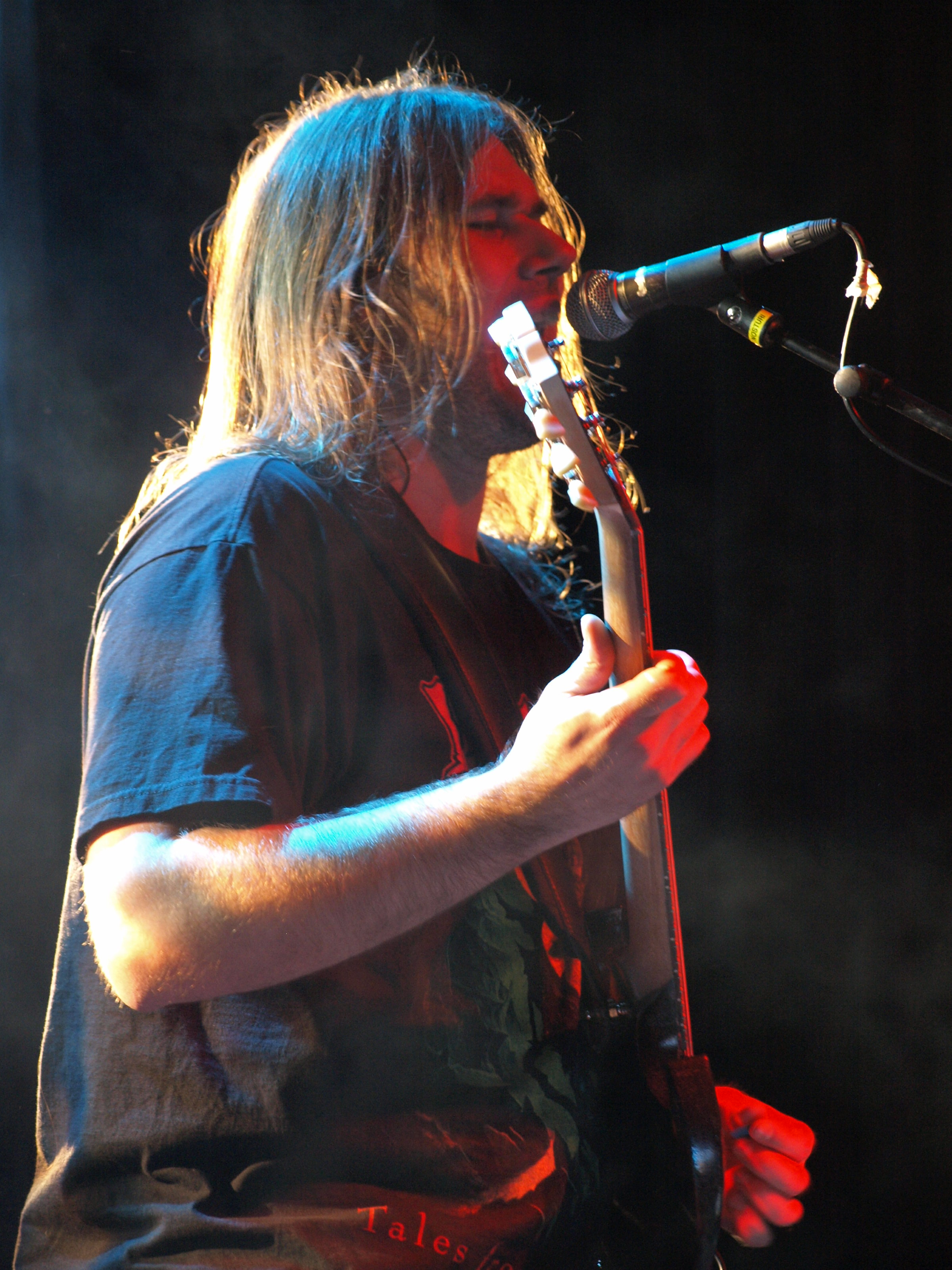
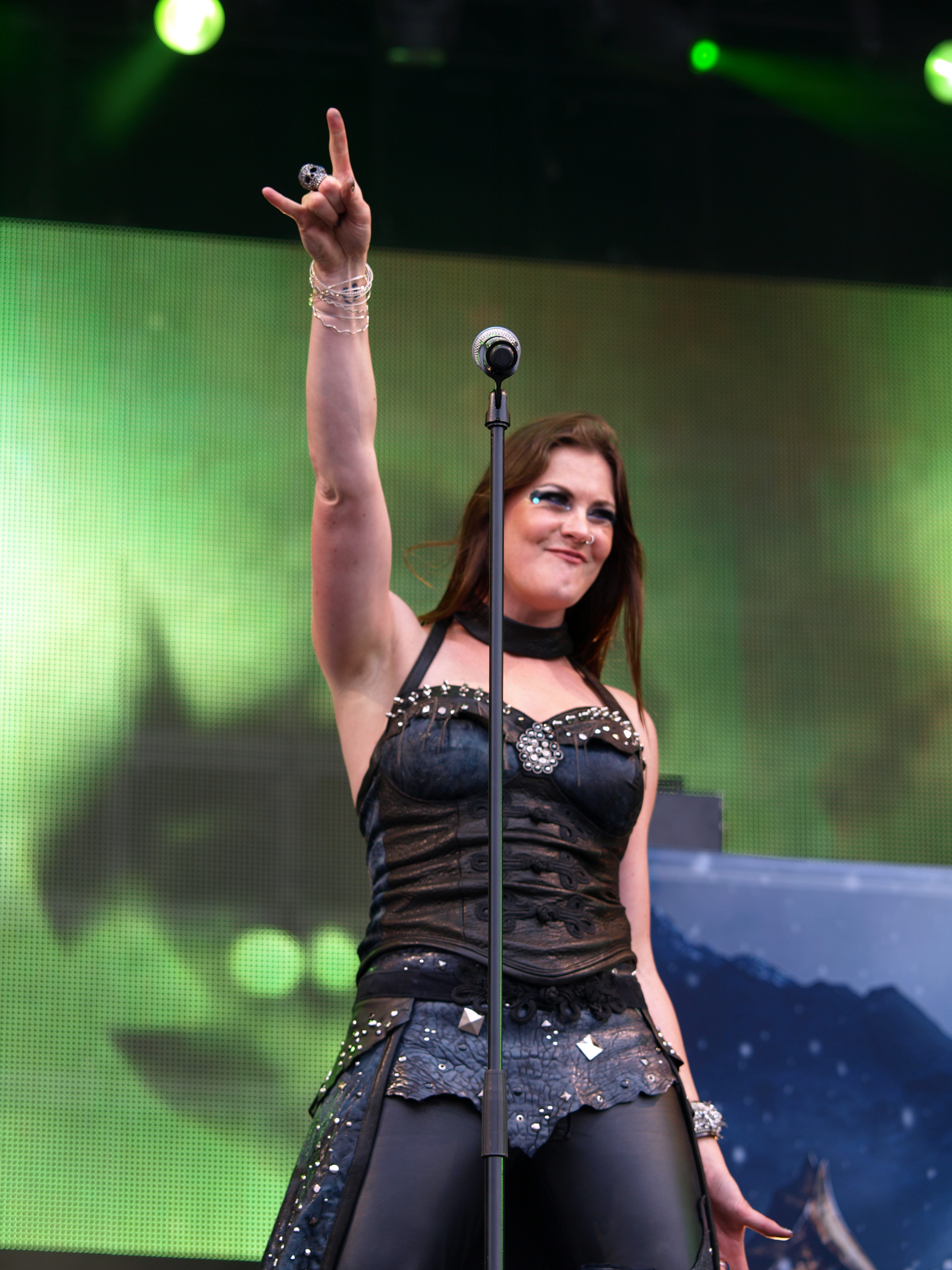
The founder of Star One, and the main vocalists of the first two studio albums, from left to right: Arjen Anthony Lucassen, Russell Allen, Damian Wilson, Dan Swanö, and Floor Jansen.

=== Instrumentalists ===
Name	Associated bands	Space Metal	Live on Earth	Victims of the Modern Age	Revel in Time
Arjen Anthony Lucassen	Ayreon, Guilt Machine, The Gentle Storm, Stream of Passion, Bodine, Vengeance	guitar, bass, keyboards, Hammond on all tracks, vocals on "Space Oddity" and "Intergalactic Laxative"	guitar	guitar, keyboards, Hammond on all tracks, vocals on "Lastday" and "Knife Edge"	guitar, bass, keyboards, Hammond on all tracks, vocals on track 8 (alternative version), guitar solo on track 10 (both versions)
Ed Warby	Gorefest, Ayreon, Elegy, Hail of Bullets, VUUR	drums	drums	drums	drums
Erik Norlander	Lana Lane, Rocket Scientists, Asia Featuring John Payne, Last in Line, Dukes of the Orient	keyboards			
Jens Johansson	Stratovarius, Yngwie Malmsteen, Cain's Offering	keyboards			keyboard solo on track 6
Gary Wehrkamp	Shadow Gallery	guitar		guitar solos on tracks 1, 2, 3, 5, and 7	
Ewa Albering	Quidam		flute		
Peter Vink	HDK, Q65, Knight Area		bass	bass	
Joost van den Broek	After Forever, ReVamp		keyboards	keyboard solos on tracks 1, 2, 3, 5, 8, and "Knife Edge"	keyboard solo on track 9 (both versions)
Erik van Ittersum	HDK, Kingfisher Sky				Solina Strings
Alessandro Del Vecchio	Sunstorm, Jørn Lande, Hardline, Voodoo Circle, Level 10, Johnny Gioeli, Silent Force				vocals and keyboards on track 6 (alternate version)
Michael Romeo	Symphony X				guitar solo on track 1 (both versions)
Timo Somers	Delain				guitar solo on track 2 (both versions)
Ron "Bumblefoot" Thal	Sons of Apollo, Guns 'N' Roses				guitar solo on track 4 (both versions)
Adrian Vandenberg	Vandenberg, Whitesnake				guitar solo on track 5 (both versions)
Marcel Singor	Kayak				guitar solo on track 8 (both versions)
Lisa Bella Donna					Moog solo on track 8 (both versions)
Steve Vai					guitar solo on track 11 (both versions)

=== Singers ===
Name	Associated bands	Space Metal	Live on Earth	Victims of the Modern Age	Revel in Time
Floor Jansen	Nightwish, Northward, ReVamp, After Forever	lead vocals	lead vocals	lead vocals	lead vocals on track 9
Russell Allen	Symphony X, Adrenaline Mob, Allen (collaborative projects)	lead vocals	lead vocals	lead vocals	lead vocals on track 2
Damian Wilson	Threshold, Headspace	lead vocals	lead vocals	lead vocals	lead vocals on track 7
Dan Swanö	Edge of Sanity, Nightingale, Witherscape	lead vocals		lead vocals	lead vocals on track 8
Robert Soeterboek		backing vocals	lead vocals		
Dave Brock	Hawkwind	lead vocals on "Hawkwind Medley"			
Edward Reekers	Kayak		guest vocals		
Irene Jansen			backing vocals		lead vocals on track 9 (alternate version)
Rodney Blaze				lead vocals on "Two Plus Two Equals Five"	
Tony Martin	Black Sabbath			lead vocals on "Closer to the Stars"	lead vocals on track 11 (alternate version)
Mike Andersson	Fullforce			lead vocals on "As the Crow Dies"	lead vocals on track 10 (alternate version)
Brittney Hayes	Unleash the Archers				lead vocals on track 1
Michael Mills	Toehider				lead vocals on track 3
Ross Jennings	Haken				lead vocals on track 3
Jeff Scott Soto	Sons of Apollo, Yngwie Malmsteen, Axel Rudi Pell				lead vocals on track 4
Brandon Yeagley	Crobot				lead vocals on track 5
Joe Lynn Turner	Fandango, Rainbow, Yngwie Malmsteen, Deep Purple				lead vocals on track 6
John Jaycee Cuijpers	Praying Mantis				lead vocals on track 10, and tracks 2, 4, and 5 (alternate versions)
Roy Khan	Conception, Kamelot				lead vocals on track 11
Marcela Bovio	Mayan, Elfonía, Stream of Passion, VUUR				lead vocals on tracks 1 and 9 (alternate versions)
Will Shaw	Heir Apparent				lead vocals on track 3 (alternate version)
Wilmer Waarbroek					lead vocals on track 7 (alternate version)

== Discography ==
- Space Metal (2002)
- Live on Earth (live album) (2003)
- Victims of the Modern Age (2010)
- Revel in Time (2022)
