= Timeline (Ayreon album) =

Compilation album by Ayreon
- Released: (Germany) (Austria) (Switzerland) 7 November 2008 (European Union) 17 November 2008; North America - January 13, 2009
- Recorded: March 1995–September 2007 (The new track was recorded in June 2008)
- Genre: Progressive metal; progressive rock; space rock
- Length: 227:30
- Label: Inside Out Music
- Producer: Arjen Lucassen

Ayreon chronology
Elected (2008)	Timeline (2008)	The Theory of Everything (2013)

Arjen Anthony Lucassen chronology
Elected (2008)	Timeline (2008)	On This Perfect Day (2009)

Professional ratings
Review scores
Source	Rating
AllMusic	3/5 stars

Timeline is the second compilation album by Dutch progressive metal project Ayreon. It was released in November 2008 in Europe. It was also released in North America in early 2009. The album features three CDs containing selected songs from all Ayreon albums, and a DVD featuring live performances, video clips and behind-the-scenes.

The third CD also features a song, called "Epilogue: The Memory Remains", specifically written for the release, which provides further insight into the final chapter of the Ayreon concept and the probable future of its characters. Jasper Steverlinck, singer of Arid, made a guest appearance as the vocalist of the song. He would later be invited by Arjen to sing on his new side project Guilt Machine.

Many songs were remastered for this release. Apart from the CDs and DVD, a timeline poster illustrating the Ayreon universe and a booklet containing new photos, lyrics, and notes on the story are also available in the Timeline package.

== Background ==
Arjen A. Lucassen said that he hadn't released a compilation album before because he didn't want to reunite random chapters of a whole history in a single album. However, after connecting all other Ayreon releases in the album 01011001, he changed his mind and decided to create the album, which can be described as a timeline outlining the entire story. As the album will feature a summarized version of Ayreon's concept, one can deduce that the concept has come to an end. Therefore, concerning Ayreon's future, Arjen stated: "I don't see this as the end of Ayreon, but rather as a new beginning. I'll definitely be recording some side projects before I even start thinking about re-inventing Ayreon. To keep things fresh for myself I've got to come up with a completely new concept for both the music and the lyrics. I hope I can do it...it will definitely be quite a challenge!"

== Epilogue: The Memory Remains ==
The brand new track, "Epilogue: The Memory Remains", adds further detail to the fate of the Forever alien race and the New Migrator, the soul of the Mars Colonist. After the last human dies, his spirit becomes the new Universal Migrator and begins traveling along the original Migrator Trail. As it does, it passes by Planet Y and breathes new life into its dormant, immortal race, rekindling their emotions as it does. The saga ends with mankind's brief existence serving a purpose after all.

== Track listing ==
=== CD 1 ===
1995: The Final Experiment

1. Prologue - 3:17
2. The Awareness - 6:36
3. Eyes of Time - 5:05
4. The Accusation (acoustic version taken from the Special Edition) - 3:43
5. Sail Away to Avalon (single version) - 3:40
6. Listen to the Waves - 4:40

1996: Actual Fantasy (Revisited)

7. Actual Fantasy - 1:31
8. Abbey of Synn - 9:25
9. Computer Eyes - 7:17
10. Back on Planet Earth - 7:04

1998: Into the Electric Castle

11. Isis and Osiris - 11:09
12. Amazing Flight - 10:21

=== CD 2 ===
1998: Into the Electric Castle

1. The Garden of Emotions - 9:40
2. The Castle Hall - 5:48
3. The Mirror Maze - 6:23
4. The Two Gates - 6:23

2000: The Universal Migrator parts I and II

5. The Shooting Company of Captain Frans B Cocq - 7:42
6. Dawn of a Million Souls - 7:44
7. And the Druids Turned to Stone - 6:32
8. Into the Black Hole - 10:17
9. The First Man on Earth - 6:54

2004: The Human Equation

10. Day Two: Isolation 8:46

=== CD 3 ===
2004: The Human Equation

1. Day Three: Pain 4:53
2. Day Six: Childhood 5:04
3. Day Twelve: Trauma 9:23
4. Day Sixteen: Loser 4:47
5. Day Seventeen: Accident? 5:41

2008: 01011001

6. Age of Shadows (edit) - 5:39
7. Ride the Comet - 3:39
8. The Fifth Extinction - 10:27
9. Waking Dreams - 6:23
10. The Sixth Extinction - 12:16

2008: New previously unreleased Ayreon track

11. Epilogue: The Memory Remains - 9:16

=== DVD ===
1. The Stranger from Within (5.1, available on Actual Fantasy Revisited)
2. Valley of the Queens (available on Star One – Live on Earth)
3. Isis and Osiris (available on Star One – Live on Earth)
4. The Two Gates (available on Star One – Live on Earth)
5. Teaser: The Human Equation (available on the special edition of The Human Equation)
6. Day Eleven: Love (5.1, available on the special edition of The Human Equation)
7. Come Back to Me (available as CD ROM track on the EP Come Back to Me)
8. Loser (Star One version, previously unreleased)
9. Farside of the World (5.1, available on Actual Fantasy Revisited)
10. Back on Planet Earth (5.1, available on Actual Fantasy Revisited)
11. Featurette Actual Fantasy (available on Actual Fantasy Revisited)
12. Computer Eyes (available on Stream of Passion – Live in the Real World)
13. Day One: Vigil (available on Stream of Passion – Live in the Real World)
14. Day Three: Pain (available on Stream of Passion – Live in the Real World)
15. The Castle Hall (available on Stream of Passion – Live in the Real World)
16. Release Party 01011001 (previously unreleased)
17. Beneath the Waves (5.1, available on the special edition of 01011001)
18. Teaser 01011001 (available on the special edition of 01011001)
19. Featurette Epilogue: The Memory Remains (previously unreleased)
