= Victims of the Modern Age =

Studio album by Star One
- Released: 25 October 2010
- Recorded: March – August 2010, Electric Castle Studios. Drums recorded at Sandlane Recording Facilities
- Genre: Progressive metal; heavy metal; space rock
- Length: 53:09
- Label: InsideOut
- Producer: Arjen Anthony Lucassen

Star One chronology
Live on Earth (2003)	Victims of the Modern Age (2010)	Revel in Time (2022)

Arjen Anthony Lucassen chronology
On This Perfect Day (2009)	Victims of the Modern Age (2010)	Lost in the New Real (2012)

Victims of the Modern Age is the second studio album by Arjen Anthony Lucassen's progressive metal project/supergroup Star One, released on the recording label Inside Out in the US on 25 October 2010 and in Europe on 1 November 2010. The album continues the style introduced on Star One's previous studio album by mixing progressive metal and space rock.

Like on their previous album, the themes of the album's songs are based on science fiction movies or TV series, however it is focused on dystopian or post-apocalyptic movies. The title of the album is a quote from Kubrick's film A Clockwork Orange.

The album was released in two editions: a regular, and a special edition with 2 CDs. It was also the first time Lucassen released a second studio album with one of his side-projects.

The cover art depicts the Holocaust Memorial in Berlin, with the people on top not to scale.

== Reception ==
Professional ratings
Review scores
Source	Rating
About.com	4.5/5 stars
Blabbermouth.net	8.5/10 stars
Blistering	8/10 stars
Dangerdog Music Reviews	5/5 stars
Angry Metal Guy	4.0/5.0

Victims of the Modern Age has received critical acclaim, with many critics praising Lucassen's composition abilities and the voices of the four singers: Craig Hartranft of DangerDog.com stated that "Lucassen and his talented crew have created a terrific and entertaining work, excelling beyond their past achievements" and "strongly recommended" the album, giving it the maximum rating. It was later chosen as one of the fifteen Albums of the Year by Dangerdog with the words "Arjen Anthony Lucassen is a bloody genius. He's a classical Baroque composer reborn in our time to write timeless music". Metal Storm gave the album a very good review, with the reviewer stating "In the end all I have to say is that I for one like this album, been a while since I was this happy with the end result." It also praised the singers who were "all brilliant and so different from each other". Blistering.com also gave a positive review of the album with a rating of 8/10, stating "As cliché as this sounds, Victims of the Modern Age is nothing like you’ll hear all year, the wry combination of the right tones and voices, with a batch of songs that are quite refreshing in today’s climate".

== Track listing ==
All lyrics are written by Arjen Anthony Lucassen except "Closer to the Stars" by Lucassen and Tony Martin; all music is composed by Lucassen.

CD 1
No.	Title	Length
1.	"Down the Rabbit Hole"	1:20
2.	"Digital Rain"	6:23
3.	"Earth That Was"	6:08
4.	"Victim of the Modern Age"	6:27
5.	"Human See, Human Do"	5:14
6.	"24 Hours"	7:20
7.	"Cassandra Complex"	5:24
8.	"It's Alive, She's Alive, We're Alive"	5:07
9.	"It All Ends Here": A. "I Think Therefore I Am"; B. "Four Years"; C. "It All Ends Here"	9:46: 4:21; 3:13; 2:12
Total length:		53:09

CD 2 (Special Editions, also included on vinyl releases (except "Making Of"))
No.	Title	Vocals	Length
1.	"As the Crow Dies"	Mike Andersson	4:42
2.	"Two Plus Two Equals Five"	Rodney Blaze, Dan Swanö	5:04
3.	"Lastday"	Arjen Anthony Lucassen	4:46
4.	"Closer to the Stars"	Tony Martin	5:11
5.	"Knife Edge" (Emerson, Lake & Palmer cover)	Damian Wilson, Lucassen, Floor Jansen, Sir Russell Allen	4:25
6.	"The Making of Victims of the Modern Age" (Video)		35:00
Total length:			54:03

== Album themes ==
The album's songs are based on the following science-fiction films or television shows:

- "Down the Rabbit Hole" - Introductory Song/The Matrix (In allusion to Alice in Wonderland)
- "Digital Rain" - The Matrix
- "Earth That Was" - Firefly / Serenity
- "Victim of the Modern Age" - A Clockwork Orange
- "Human See, Human Do" - Planet of the Apes
- "24 Hours" - Escape from New York
- "Cassandra Complex" - 12 Monkeys
- "It's Alive, She's Alive, We're Alive" - Children of Men
- "It All Ends Here" - Blade Runner
- "As the Crow Dies" - The Road
- "Two Plus Two Equals Five" - Nineteen Eighty-Four
- "Lastday" - Logan's Run
- "Closer to the Stars" - Gattaca

== Personnel ==
Star One

- Sir Russell Allen – vocals
- Damian Wilson – vocals
- Dan Swanö – vocals
- Floor Jansen – vocals
- Arjen Anthony Lucassen – guitars, Hammond, mellotron, analog synths, solina strings on all tracks, lead vocals on "Lastday" and "Knife Edge"
- Peter Vink – bass guitar
- Ed Warby – drums
- Gary Wehrkamp – guitar solos on CD1: 2, 3, 5, 7
- Joost van den Broek – keyboard solos on CD1: 2, 3, 5, 8 and CD2: 5

Additional musicians

- Tony Martin – lead vocals on "Closer to the Stars"
- Mike Andersson – lead vocals on "As the Crow Dies"
- Rodney Blaze – lead vocals on "Two Plus Two Equals Five"

Production

- Arjen Anthony Lucassen – production, mixing, mastering, recordings supervision
- Oscar Holleman – drum recordings supervision
- Thomas Ewerhard – layout
- Christophe Dessaigne – artwork, photos
- Lori Linstruth – filming and editing of "The Making of Victims of the Modern Age", management

== Charts ==
2010 chart performance for Victims of the Modern Age
Chart (2010)	Peak position
Dutch Albums (Album Top 100)	21
German Albums (Offizielle Top 100)	61

2022 chart performance for Victims of the Modern Age
Chart (2022)	Peak position
Belgian Albums (Ultratop Flanders)	179
