= Irene Jansen =

Dutch singer (born 1983)

- Born: 16 July 1983 (age 43)
- Origin: Netherlands
- Genres: Symphonic metal; progressive metal
- Occupation: Singer
- Years active: 2001–present
- Website: Irene Jansen on Facebook

Irene Jansen is a Dutch singer. She sang on the Ayreon album The Human Equation, portraying the character Passion. She was also the live backing vocalist of Star One during their tour in 2003, and played the character Morgana in two Gary Hughes concept albums. She was the lead singer of a power metal band called Karma. She made her first recordings in more than a decade for the Alarion album Waves of Destruction, released in 2016. Jansen currently is also a backing singer for the band Lucassen & Soeterboek's Plan Nine.

She is the younger sister of former After Forever, ReVamp and Nightwish singer Floor Jansen.

== Discography ==
=== Alarion ===
- Waves of Destruction (2016) – vocals

=== Ayreon ===
- The Human Equation (2004) – vocals (Passion)
- "Day Eleven: Love" (single, 2004) – vocals (Passion)
- The Final Experiment (2005 re-release) – vocals (Merlin and the Knights in "Merlin's Will")
- The Theater Equation (live DVD, 2016) – vocals (Passion)
- Ayreon Universe – The Best of Ayreon Live (live DVD, 2018) – vocals, backing vocals
- 01011001 – Live Beneath the Waves (live DVD, 2024) – vocals, backing vocals

=== Freak Neil Inc. ===
- Characters (2005) – vocals

=== Gary Hughes ===
- Once and Future King Part I (2003)
- Once and Future King Part II (2003)

=== Karma ===
- Demo (2003) – lead vocals

=== Lucassen & Soeterboek's Plan Nine ===
- Long Lost Songs (2024) backing vocals

=== Northward ===
- Northward (2018) – guest vocals

=== Mantra Vega ===
- The Illusion's Reckoning (2016) – vocals

=== Star One ===
- Live on Earth (live, 2003) – backing vocals
- Revel in Time (2022) — vocals on "Hand on the Clock (Alternate Version)", backing vocals
