= The Darkest Skies Are the Brightest =

Studio album by Anneke van Giersbergen
- Released: 26 February 2021
- Recorded: 2018–2020
- Genre: Alternative rock
- Length: 41:48
- Label: Inside Out Music
- Producer: Gijs Coolen

Anneke van Giersbergen chronology
Drive (2013)	The Darkest Skies Are the Brightest (2021)

The Darkest Skies Are the Brightest is the third solo studio album by Anneke van Giersbergen, released on 26 February 2021 by Inside Out Music. It was written entirely by van Giersbergen and produced by Gijs Coolen.

== Background ==
After releasing the first VUUR album in 2017 and going on tour, Anneke van Giersbergen and the band started plans of recording a second album for the project in 2018. This first effort, although, had been financially demanding, and recording a second album and going on a second tour would imply more financial risks. At the same time, the singer's marriage went through difficulties and she and her husband envisioned a divorce. As a way of recovering and think about her future life decisions, van Giersbergen retreated alone to a small house near the woods outside Eindhoven. She then started writing songs by herself there, with just an acoustic guitar and basic musical gear, without the intention of transforming them into a full album. In 2020, delving back to that songs, the singer invited her friend and producer Gijs Coolen to help her polish the songs. Eleven of them ended up becoming a full album, and so van Giersbergen decided to release them. The release was announced on 16 November 2020, along with the cover artwork and the tracklist. The title, The Darkest Skies Are the Brightest, reflects the album main themes and refers to the idea that people are forced to find answers regarding big life questions when facing personal challenges.

The first single from the album, "My Promise", was released on 4 December. The lyrics came from van Giersbergen reflecting on how her life after a divorce would be and revolves around her determination to fight for love. According to the singer, "for the new album [she] wrote a lot of songs filled with messages of love and heartache, but [she] also went on a more propulsive journey, with darker storytelling", which is clear in the second single released, "Hurricane". Musically, the album follows a more melancholic and modest landscape, opposite to the singer latest progressive metal ventures. It features mainly acoustic guitars, strings, horns and percussion, along with van Giersbergen's vocals.

== Track listing ==
All music and lyrics composed by Anneke van Giersbergen and produced by Gijs Coolen.

No.	Title	Length
1.	"Agape"	4:09
2.	"Hurricane"	3:57
3.	"My Promise"	4:27
4.	"I Saw a Car"	3:39
5.	"The Soul Knows"	3:52
6.	"The End"	4:19
7.	"Keep It Simple"	3:56
8.	"Lo and Behold"	2:50
9.	"Losing You"	3:41
10.	"Survive"	3:46
11.	"Love You Like I Love You"	3:12
Total length:		41:48

== Personnel ==
- Anneke van Giersbergen - vocals (all tracks), guitar (11), bass (11), percussion (4 and 8), music, lyrics, sleeve notes
- Ruud Peeters - string arrangements (1, 3, 6 and 11)
- Judith Groen - cello (1, 3, 6 and 11)
- Nicky Hustinx - drums (1, 3–5, 7, 9 and 10)
- Gijs Coolen - guitar (all tracks), bass (1–3 and 7), percussion (4, 5 and 8), cello (7 and 8), backing vocals (7 and 8), producing, recording
- Paloma Ortas - viola (1, 3, 6 and 11)
- Joanna Czaj - violin (1, 3, 6 and 11)
- Martijn Bosman - drums (2)
- Coos Zwagerman - trumpet (2)
- Ewelina Peeters - violin (3, 6 and 11)
- Joost van Haaren - bass (5 and 10)
- Marielle Woltring - backing vocals (7)

Crew

- Pieter Hoekstra (Pie Design) - artwork, layout
- Snir Gedasi Design - design (heart)
- Robbin Gielen - management (assisted by)
- Rob Snijders - management
- Darius van Helfteren - mastering
- Guido Aalbers - mixing
- Lida van Straaten - other (hair & makeup)
- Dylan van Duijne - other (styling)
- Mark Uyl - photography
- Erik Spanjers - recording (string arrangements)

== Charts ==
Chart (2021)	Peak position
Dutch Albums (Album Top 100)	5
German Albums (Offizielle Top 100)	63
Swiss Albums (Schweizer Hitparade)	73

== Release history ==
Region	Date	Format	Label	Catalog	Ref
Various	26 February 2021	CD; digital download	Inside Out Music	B08NTX2S1M	
Various	26 February 2021	Vinyl	Century Media Records	Y4LPCE359	
