= Elected (EP) =

EP by Ayreon
- Released: 25 April 2008
- Recorded: Late January - February 2008 (title track)
- Genre: Progressive metal
- Length: 13:45
- Language: English
- Label: Inside Out Music/SPV

Ayreon chronology
01011001 (2008)	Elected (2008)	Timeline (2008)

Elected is the first EP by progressive metal project Ayreon, owned by Dutch musician Arjen Anthony Lucassen. It was released on 25 April 2008 in Germany, Austria and Switzerland, and on 28 April in the rest of Europe. It features the guest performance of German singer Tobias Sammet, from Avantasia and Edguy.

The EP contains an Alice Cooper cover, an acoustic guitar and voice version of "E=MC²" and the track "Ride the Comet", both from the album 01011001. There is also a piano version of The Human Equation's "Day Six: Childhood". Some reviewers and also the CD-Text information on the CD itself call the EP The Universal Ayreonaut.

The EP entered at #69 at the France Singles Top 100 and stayed in that position for three weeks. It appeared on the Dutch Charts for one week at #100.

== Background ==
In January 2008, both Ayreon’s and Avantasia’s latest albums were released (01011001 and The Scarecrow, respectively). The press soon started to create speculations on the possibility of them being rivals and which album would be more successful. When asked about this, Arjen Anthony Lucassen (mastermind behind Ayreon) stated that he was mad at Tobias Sammet, head of Avantasia, because Tobias managed to have Alice Cooper, who is Arjen's favorite singer, to perform on his last Avantasia album, leading to some incendiary emails sent to Sammet on Lucassen's part. Coincidentally, Tobias was also mad at Arjen because he had Bruce Dickinson (Tobias' favorite singer) performing on his Ayreon album Universal Migrator Part 2: Flight of the Migrator and the media's constant queries about his thoughts on Ayreon after the creation of his Avantasia project. To "put some fuel on the fire created by the press", as Arjen stated on his website, they decided to record a song together. Initially, the EP was to be titled Ayreon vs. Avantasia.

== Critical reception ==
Metal.de said that a purchase is worthwhile for the title track alone. The other tracks were remarked to be interest to only Ayreon fans and were deemed non-essential, although Marjan Welman's vocal performance was called excellent. Powermetal.de said the title track is nice but anemic and below Lucassen's usual standards. Welman's singing on "E=MC²" was noted as brilliant. Vampster said "Elected" is worse than the original Alice Cooper version but still liked the track and the two acoustic tracks, and recommended the EP to fans of both bands.

== Track listing ==
1. "Elected" (Alice Cooper cover) - 3:37
2. "E=MC²" (Live acoustic radio version) - 3:32
3. "Ride the Comet" - 3:32
4. "Day Six: Childhood" (Piano version) - 3:04

== Personnel ==
- Arjen Anthony Lucassen (Ayreon) – electric and acoustic guitars, bass, keyboards
- Ed Warby (Gorefest) – drums
- Tobias Sammet (Edguy, Avantasia) – lead vocals in "Elected"
- Marjan Welman (Elister, Autumn) – lead vocals in "E=MC²" and "Day Six: Childhood"
- Floor Jansen (After Forever) – vocals in "Ride the Comet"
- Tom Englund (Evergrey) – vocals in "Ride the Comet"
- Jonas Renkse (Katatonia) – vocals in "Ride the Comet"
- Bob Catley (Magnum) – vocals in "Ride the Comet"
- Magali Luyten (Virus IV) – vocals in "Ride the Comet"
- Joost van den Broek (After Forever) – piano in "Day Six: Childhood"
