= Damian Wilson =

English progressive rock and metal singer

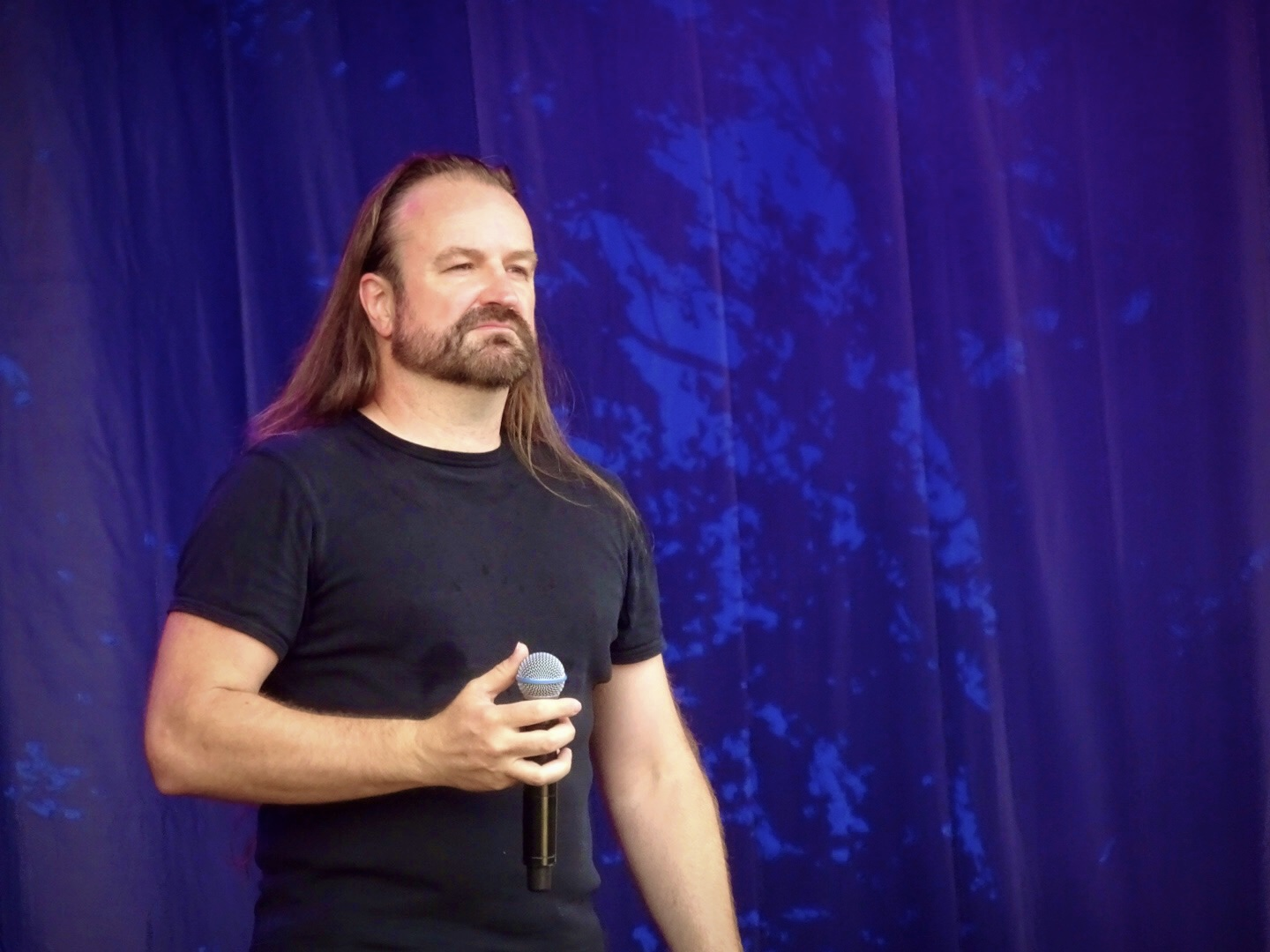

Background information
- Also known as: Damian Wilson
- Born: 11 October 1969 (age 57); Woking, Surrey, England
- Genres: Progressive metal; progressive rock
- Occupation: Singer-songwriter
- Instruments: Vocals; guitar
- Years active: 1991–present
- Labels: Verglas Records; Cosmas Records; Blacklake Records
- Member of: Headspace; Maiden uniteD; Star One; Arena
- Formerly of: Ayreon; Landmarq; Threshold
- Website: damian-wilson.net

Damian Wilson (born 11 October 1969) is an English singer-songwriter and musician. Wilson works in the progressive metal genre and was the lead singer of Headspace, Arena and Threshold. He sang and toured with bands and projects for Star One, Ayreon, Landmarq, Praying Mantis and with Rick Wakeman's English Rock Ensemble.

As a solo artist he has released 5 solo albums, a DVD and a retrospective compilation album.

== 1990 – 2000 ==
Damian began recording music in 1991 with the band Landmarq. He featured on their debut album, Solitary Witness which was released in 1992, followed by a second album, Infinity Parade (1993) and The Vision Pit (1995).

Wilson sang on English prog metal band Threshold's debut album Wounded Land (1993). In 1996, Wilson joined up with Threshold again to record their third album Extinct Instinct. Another successful European tour followed, after which Wilson left the group. During that time Iron Maiden approached Wilson to audition and considered him as a replacement for the departing Bruce Dickinson.

In 1997, Wilson's first solo album Cosmas was released. This album was a departure from the heavy/progressive rock sound to which his fans had become accustomed.

In 1998, Wilson was one of the lead vocalists on Arjen Lucassen's Ayreon album Into the Electric Castle.

From 1998 to 2000 he played the lead role of Jean Valjean in Sir Cameron Mackintosh's touring production of Les Misérables. He was asked to audition for the role after he tripped over the dog owned by an actor who knew his work, while running along the Thames.

== 2000 – 2010 ==
After the Les Misérables tour, Wilson sang on the next three Ayreon albums The Dream Sequencer, Flight of the Migrator and Ayreonauts Only. His collaboration with Arjen Lucassen resulted in three more Star One albums; Space Metal (2002), Live on Earth (2003) and Victims of the Modern Age (2010). In 2000 and 2001, Wilson toured Europe and South America with Rick Wakeman as part of the English Rock Ensemble. This resulted in a Live DVD and an album Out There.

After the tour with Rick Wakeman, Wilson released his second solo album Disciple (2001) which was partially recorded at Abbey Road Studios in London. The recording session at Abbey Road was filmed and broadcast by the BBC.

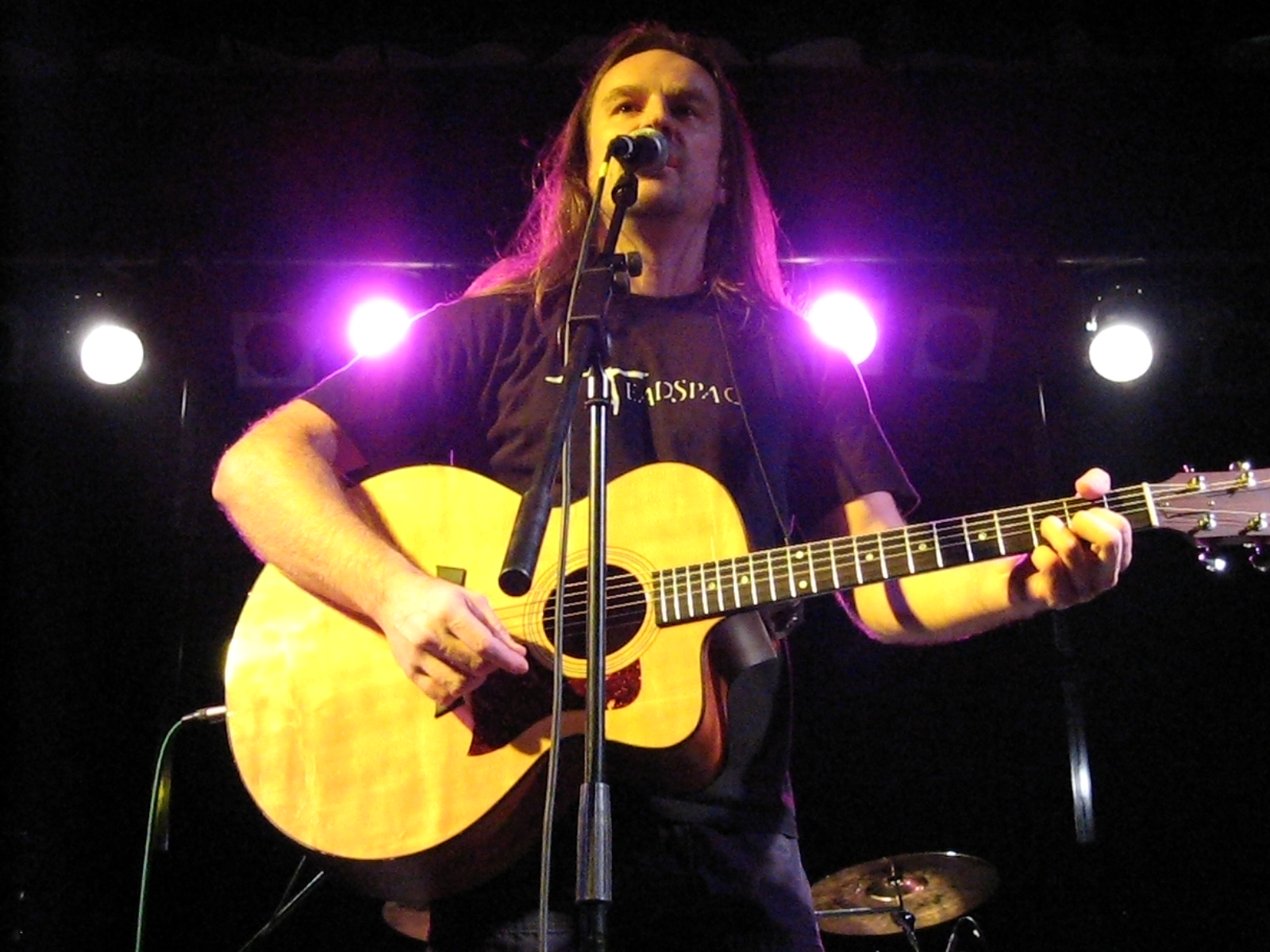
Damian Wilson performing solo in 2007

Wilson toured his solo material with a full band under the name Damian Wilson Band. A second tour was planned, but Wilson was hospitalized and the tour was cancelled. A studio session recording of the rehearsals for the tour was released on CD in 2002, Live in Rehearsal. In 2003 Wilson 's third official album Let’s Start A Commune was released.

Together with Adam Wakeman Wilson formed the progressive metal band Headspace. Mainly to keep in contact with each other between their busy touring schedules. An EP I Am was released in 2007 and they supported Ozzy Osbourne on his Black Rain tour in 2007.

Just before the start of their Dead Reckoning tour, Threshold singer Andrew McDermott left the band. Having only a few days to learn the new Threshold material, Wilson stepped in as lead vocalist for the tour. Reinstated as lead vocalist, for the first time since 1997, Wilson continued to tour with the band. In 2009 Wilson toured Europe with his Damian Wilson Band. This time he performed songs from the bands and projects he had been involved in as well as solo material. The tour was filmed and released in 2011 as 3DVD set including a live concert and tour documentary Cheers Lads; 20 Years Of Avoiding A Job.

== 2010 – present ==
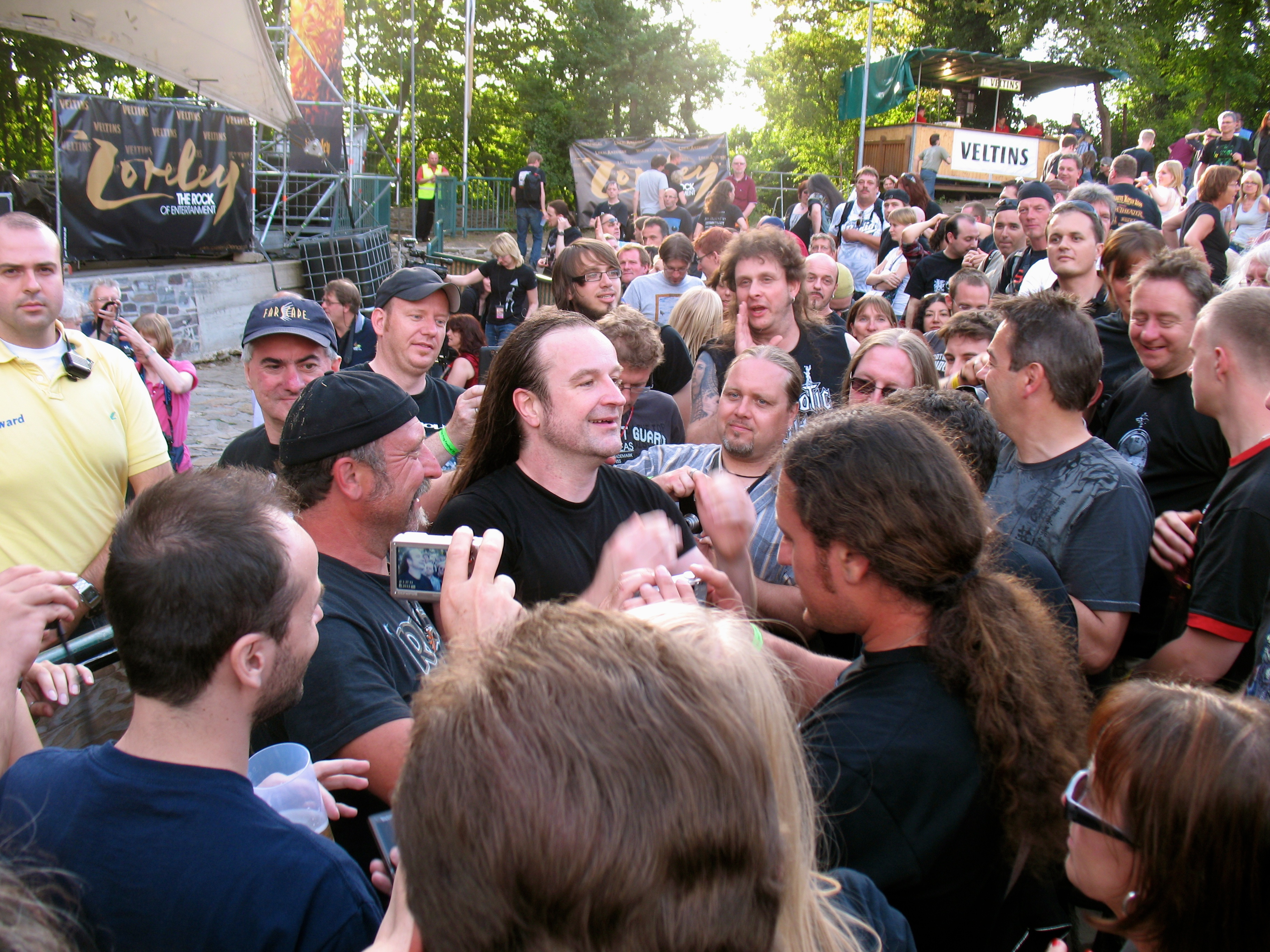
Wilson (middle) after a Threshold show

Within Temptation guitarist Ruud Jolie, who also played guitar during the 2009 DWB tour, asked Wilson to sing for his side project Maiden uniteD’; a collective of musicians that play rearranged acoustic version of Iron Maiden tracks. Wilson and Anneke van Giersbergen sang on their first album Mind The Acoustic Pieces (2010). After a small club tour the project takes off and Wilson played venues and big festivals in Europe. He recorded two more albums with the project Across The Seventh Sea (2012) and Remembrance (2015).

Wilson also released a 31-track retrospective double album, I Thought The World Was Listening 1997–2011. This album featured remastered tracks from throughout Wilson's solo career, re-recorded versions of songs and previously unreleased new material. The release of this album also marked the return to the stage as a solo artist. Wilson has been playing select solo shows, mainly acoustic, through Europe since 2011.

Wilson's solo album Cosmas was re-released as a remastered edition in 2012. On the last of a series of solo shows he played the album in its entirety.

Headspace signed a three-record deal with Inside Out Music and their debut album I Am Anonymous was released in 2012. It is a concept album in which Wilson's lyrics are directed the listener. "This is about you and your relationship with humanity, ultimately the battles fought within the mind from child to man. Through Kubler Ross' model of impending death, with reference to war, the turmoil leads us to peace and acceptance... only then to swing straight back round to chaos". A second album was released in 2016; All That You Fear Is Gone.

2012 was also the year in which Threshold released its first album since 1996 with Wilson as lead vocalist, March Of Progress, followed by a European club and festival tour. A second album, For The Journey, followed in 2014. The following tour was recorded and released as double live album European Journey in 2015. Threshold and Wilson parted ways in 2017.

In October 2015, he announced two new albums for 2016. Weir Keeper's Tale; an acoustic album with Adam Wakeman, which was released in January 2016, and a new solo album, his first in over a decade. "I've never stopped writing songs so I have accumulated a lot since my last solo album. In June we have started recording in Dublin with some amazing musicians from all over Europe. We’re happy to say that we’ve come a long way these last couple of months and the album is taking shape. I believe we’re creating something worthy of your expectations. The songs reflect on how our personal relationships are relevant to the bigger picture, even on a world level", he stated.

The new album Built for Fighting was released 9 September 2016. The album contains 11 new original songs and a cover of Depeche Mode's Somebody Built for Fighting was mixed and mastered in Sweden by the Fascination Street duo Jens Bogren and Tony Lindgren, who have worked with acts such as Opeth, Devin Townsend and Headspace.

The track "Thrill Me" was released as a single on 9 August and made the BBC Radio 2 playlist. On 4 August 2017, a new version of the song "Impossible" was released. The track was remixed by Dave Bascombe. The second album with Adam Wakeman, accompanied with a 22-date acoustic tour, was released in February 2018; The Sun Will Dance in Its Twilight Hour. After the tour they went into the studio for one day and tried to capture the onstage chemistry. They recorded everything and released it as a session album Stripped in January 2019.

Wilson released a five-track EP on his 50th birthday, 11 October 2019. The EP Thank You was a return to a more classical approach of recording, just with piano and string orchestra.

Wilson joined the band Arena in 2020, following the departure of their previous singer Paul Manzi. Early 2026, Arena announced Wilson will be stepping down at the end of 2026 after which Manzi will rejoin. In 2026, Wilson was cast as the Journalist and the Sung Thoughts of the Journalist in Jeff Wayne's Musical Version of The War of the Worlds Live! The Concert Experience.

== Discography ==
=== Studio albums - solo ===
- Cosmas – 1997 (Remastered version released in 2012)
- Disciple – 2001
- Let's Start a Commune – 2003
- Built for Fighting – 2016
- Limehouse to Lechlade – 2021

=== Solo Works - other ===
- Live in Rehearsal (studio session) – 2002
- 20 Years of Avoiding a Job (DVD) – 2011
- I Thought the World Was Listening. 1997 – 2011 – 2011
- Wedding Song – 2012 (7" vinyl single. B-side contains the same song performed by Alex Sharpe)
- Thrill Me – 2016 (single)
- Impossible (Dave Bascombe Mix) – 2017 (single)
- Thank You (The Holdsworth Sessions) – 2019 (EP)
- Hard To Keep Faith – 2020 (Single)

=== With Landmarq ===
- Solitary Witness – 1992
- Infinity Parade – 1993
- The Vision Pit – 1995

=== With Arena ===
- The Theory of Molecular Inheritance - 2022
- Lifian (Live Double) - 2023

=== With Threshold ===
- Wounded Land – 1993
- Extinct Instinct – 1997
- Paradox (singles box set) – 2009
- March of Progress – 2012
- For the Journey – 2014
- European Journey (Live) – 2015

=== With Rick Wakeman and the New English Rock Ensemble ===
- Out of the Blue (live) – 2001
- Live in Buenos Aires (DVD) – 2001
- Out There – 2003
- Out There – The movie – 2004

=== With Headspace ===
- I Am... (Ep) – 2007
- I Am Anonymous – 2012
- All That You Fear Is Gone – 2016

=== With Maiden United ===
- Mind the Acoustic Pieces – 2010
- The Trooper (Single) – 2010
- Across the Seventh Sea – 2012
- Remembrance – 2015

=== With Arjen Lucassen ===
- Ayreon – Into the Electric Castle – 1998
- Ayreon – Universal Migrator Part 1: The Dream Sequencer – 2000 (Lead vocals on "And the Druids Turned to Stone")
- Ayreon – Universal Migrator Part 2: Flight of the Migrator – 2000 (Backing vocals on "Dawn of a Million Souls")
- Ayreon – Ayreonauts Only – 2000 (Lead vocals on "Into the Black Hole")
- Star One – Space Metal – 2002
- Star One – Live on Earth – 2003
- Stream of Passion – Live in the Real World – 2006
- Star One – Victims of the Modern Age – 2010
- Ayreon Universe – The Best of Ayreon Live – 2018
- Ayreon – Electric Castle Live and Other Tales – 2020
- Star One – Revel in Time (on "Bridge of Life") – 2022
- Ayreon - 01011001 – Live Beneath the Waves – 2024

=== With Adam Wakeman ===
- Weir Keeper's Tale (2016)
- The Sun Will Dance in Its Twilight Hour (2018)
- Stripped (2019)
- Can We Leave The Light On Longer? (2024)

=== With other artists ===
- After Forever – Mea Culpa – 2006
- After Forever – Decipher – 2001
- After Forever – Emphasis (Single) – 2001 (Lead vocals on "Imperfect Tenses" & "Who Wants to Live Forever")
- Aina – Days of Rising Doom – 2003 (Vocals on "Revelations")
- Alarion – Waves of Destruction – 2016 (Lead & backing vocals on "Chains of the Collective", "Waves of Destruction – II – Struggle for Survival", "Colourblind", "The Whistleblower – I – Devastation", "The Whistleblower – II – Vindication", narration on: "Waves of Destruction – I – Rising Tide", "The Whistleblower – II – Vindication")
- Archangel – The Akallabeth – 2009
- Archangel – Tales of Love and Blood – 2013
- Arena – The Theory of Molecular Inheritance – 2022
- Casual Silence – Lost in Life – 2007 (Guest Vocals)
- Clive Nolan – Alchemy – 2013
- Computer Mind – The Aspie Project – 2014
- Dave Bainbridge – Celestial Fire – 2014
- Edward Reekers – The Liberty Project – 2023
- Ex Libris – Medea (Song of Discord) – 2014
- For All We Know – For All We Know – 2011
- Fughu – Human (The Facts) – 2013 (as Mr. Tloth)
- Galexia – Recidivate – 2008 (Single)
- Gary Hughes – Once & Future King Part 1 – 2003 (Lead vocals on "Excalibur")
- Guy Fletcher – Inamorata – 2008 (Backing Vocals)
- Jeronimo Road – Live at the Orange – 2006
- Lalu – Paint the Sky – 2022
- LaSalle – LaSalle – 1993
- Micha Calvin – Evolution 2 – 1995 (Backing vocals)
- Mostly Autumn – Passengers – 2003 (Backing vocals)
- Oxhole – Ocean of Colours – 2022 (Lead vocals on "D.E.M.")
- Peter Gee – East of Eden – 2011
- Port Mahadia – Echoes in Time – 2007
- Resource – More Than a Feeling – 2006 (Single)
- Revealing Songs of Yes − 2001 (Lead vocals on "Going For the One" & "And You & I")
- Seti – Discoveries – 2010
- Shadowkeep - A Chaos Theory – 2001 (Backing vocals)
- Shadowland – Mad as a Hatter – 1996 (Backing vocals on "Salvation Comes")
- Shadrane – Neurastasia – 2004
- Tales from Yesterday w/Jeronimo Road – 1995 (Lead vocals on the "Starship Trooper")
- Thomas Zwijsen – Perfect Storm (Nylonized Album) – 2014
- Unwritten Pages – Part 1. Noah – 2010
- Wicked Sensation – Reflected – 2002 (Backing vocals on "You're the Answer", "Stand Tall", "Highspeed Chase", "The Preacher", "Night on Fire", "Caught in a Fantasy", "Let it Ride", and "Joker in the Pack")

=== Films ===
- Guy Fletcher – Sergeant Pepper – My Best Friend vocals/co-written (2004)
- Guy Fletcher – Spirit Trap – Tie me down (Spirit Trap) vocal/co-written (2006)
