= I Am Anonymous =

Studio album by Headspace
- Released: 22 May 2012
- Genre: Progressive metal, progressive rock
- Length: 72:16
- Label: Inside Out Music/Century Media Records
- Producer: Headspace, Jens Bogren

Headspace chronology
I Am... (2007)	I Am Anonymous (2012)

Professional ratings
Review scores
Source	Rating
The Metal Pit	9.5/10 stars
Metal Storm	(favourable)
Power of Metal	10/10 stars
Prog Magazine	(favourable)
Progulator	4.5/5 stars

I Am Anonymous is the first studio album by English progressive metal band Headspace, released on 22 May 2012.

== Background ==
According to Adam Wakeman, "I Am Anonymous is a heavily guitar oriented record. That wasn’t the intention, but [Pete Rinaldi] is a killer guitar player, and the album just evolved the way it did."

On Headspace official website, it is specified that the album "is about you [the listener] and your relationship with humanity, ultimately the battles fought within the mind from child to man". The Kübler-Ross model is cited as an important element of the lyric's meaning.

== Track listing ==
All tracks are written by Headspace.

No.	Title	Length
1.	"Stalled Armageddon"	8:06
2.	"Fall of America"	10:28
3.	"Soldier"	3:44
4.	"Die with a Bullet"	8:24
5.	"In Hell's Name"	9:31
6.	"Daddy Fucking Loves You"	15:00
7.	"Invasion"	8:27
8.	"The Big Day"	9:54

== Personnel ==
- Damian Wilson – lead vocals
- Pete Rinaldi – acoustic and electric guitars, backing vocals
- Adam Wakeman – keyboards, backing vocals, piano
- Lee Pomeroy – bass, Chapman stick, pedals
- Richard Brook – drums, percussion
