= Guilt Machine =

Musical project by Arjen Anthony Lucassen

- Origin: Netherlands
- Genres: Progressive metal, progressive rock
- Years active: 2009–present
- Label: Mascot Records
- Members: Arjen Anthony Lucassen; Jasper Steverlinck; Chris Maitland; Lori Linstruth
- Website: arjenlucassen.com

Guilt Machine is a musical project by Dutch musician Arjen Anthony Lucassen, owner of other musical projects such as Star One, Ayreon and Ambeon. The project's debut release, On This Perfect Day, was released in August 2009.

== Biography ==
=== Background ===
In February 2009, Arjen announced on his website that he would be working on his new side project Guilt Machine. This project features a very limited line-up, compared to Arjen's other side projects: Arjen on the instruments and backing vocals, Jasper Steverlinck (Arid) on lead vocals, Chris Maitland (ex-Porcupine Tree) on drums and Lori Linstruth (ex-Stream of Passion) on lead guitar.

On 9 March, Arjen announced that fans would be able to submit their own recorded material for a possible inclusion on the project. The material had to be sent in the form of a brief audio message containing the person's thoughts in his/her mother language, with a translation. The deadline for submission was on 15 March.

Recently, Arjen has signed a deal with Mascot Records.

Together with the announcement of the signing with Mascot Records at his official website, Arjen reported that more than 200 audio messages were sent, but only 19 would be included on the album. According to him, the languages range from Chinese to Tagalog and from French to Russian.

He informed that the album will include an eight-minute instrumental track filled with as many messages as he could have used (although many recordings would still remain unused).

=== On This Perfect Day ===
On 23 June 2009, Lucassen announced the release of Guilt Machine's first release, On This Perfect Day. It was released on 28 August in Germany, Austria and Switzerland, on 31 August in the rest of Europe, and on 29 September in the US. Most of the songs are relatively long, the shortest lasting 6:11. Limited and Special editions were released, the limited edition contained a 32-page digibook and a DVD and the special edition came with a Digipack 24-page booklet and a DVD.

Regarding a future album of the project, Arjen stated in 2009 that "we definitely want to make another Guilt Machine album.". In a Q&A in August 2018, he stated "I would love to do another Guilt Machine because I'm extremely proud of [On This Perfect Day] [...] Lori wrote the lyrics and she did an amazing job. I'd love to do another Guilt Machine but it would probably be with different people. Again, you know, not everyone is available anymore. But yeah, it's definitely an option. It's not a plan yet, but it's definitely an option."

== Musical style ==
According to Arjen, the music will range "from dark and heavy to atmospheric and melancholic". Regarding the concept, Arjen stated that instead of fantasy and science fiction themes, Guilt Machine will explore "the destructive psychology of guilt, regret and the darkest form of secret -- the secrets we hide from ourselves." In spite of the differences, the songs are expected to keep the dynamic contrasts, intricated harmonies, complex rhythms and soaring melodies of any Ayreon release.

Although Jasper and his band are from the alternative rock genre, he was convinced by Arjen to work on this progressive metal project. Arjen has stated:

"In the beginning, it was hard to convince Jasper to sing on this album, because he comes from a completely different musical background. He didn't even know what prog was, but we've made a believer out of him! What I admire about Jasper's voice, besides its beautiful clear timbre, is the emotion and credibility he puts into his performance and his enormous range. Because this project features just one singer I needed someone versatile enough to portray all of the different moods, and Jasper didn't disappoint. And he's a really nice and dedicated guy as well!"

Instead of working with Ed Warby, the drummer that performed in most of Ayreon albums, Arjen chose Chris Maitland, which, according to him, "was the ideal choice this time, having both the power for the heavy sections and the subtle touch needed in the more atmospheric parts".

Lori Linstruth, the lead guitarist and manager, pleased Arjen with her lyrics:

"At first I asked my partner and personal manager Lori to quickly write scratch lyrics for one of the songs so I could record some guide vocals. I was so impressed by what she produced that I asked her to write the lyrics for all the songs. I was unable myself to create the type of darkly enigmatic, open-ended lyrics I wanted for these songs, my specialty being sci-fi lyrics about sinister aliens. She definitely gave the songs an extra dimension with her lyrics, exorcising the demons we both had faced in the past few years. It's also no secret that I've always been a big fan of her melodic guitar style, so she also plays all the guitar solos on this album."

== Personnel ==
- Jasper Steverlinck (Arid) – lead vocals
- Arjen Anthony Lucassen (Ayreon/Ambeon/Star One/ex-Stream of Passion) – rhythm guitar, bass, keyboards, various instruments, backing vocals
- Lori Linstruth (ex-Stream of Passion) – lead guitar
- Chris Maitland (ex-Porcupine Tree) – drums

== Discography ==
- On This Perfect Day (full-length, 2009, Mascot Records)
