= Live on Earth (Star One album) =

Live album by Star One
- Released: 29 April 2003
- Recorded: 5 October 2002, Lucky & Co in Rijssen, Netherlands
- Genre: Progressive metal, space rock, progressive rock
- Length: 114:06
- Label: Inside Out Music
- Producer: Arjen Anthony Lucassen

Star One chronology
Space Metal (2002)	Live on Earth (2003)	Victims of the Modern Age (2010)

Arjen Anthony Lucassen chronology
Space Metal (2002)	Live on Earth (2003)	The Human Equation (2004)

Arjen Anthony Lucassen live chronology
Live on Earth (2003)	Live in the Real World (2006)

Professional ratings
Review scores
Source	Rating
AllMusic	3/5 stars

Live on Earth is the first live CD and DVD by Dutch singer and musician Arjen Anthony Lucassen's progressive metal project/supergroup Star One. It features songs from their debut album Space Metal, but also numerous songs from Lucassen's other project Ayreon.

The album was recorded live on 5 October 2002 at Lucky & Co in Rijssen, Netherlands by Andreas Grotenhoff (audial mobile-Recording studio, Germany) and is the first live album Lucassen had ever recorded.

== Track listing ==
=== Disc one ===
1. "Intro/Lift Off" - 1:34
2. "Set Your Controls" - 6:19
3. "High Moon" - 5:28
4. "Dreamtime" - 2:55
5. "Eyes of Time" - 3:50
6. "Songs of the Ocean" - 5:59
7. "Dawn of a Million Souls" - 5:17
8. "The Dream Sequencer" - 6:03
9. "Into the Black Hole" - 11:28
10. "Actual Fantasy" - 1:26
11. "Valley of the Queens" - 3:23

=== Disc two ===
1. "Isis and Osiris" - 8:48
2. "Amazing Flight in Space" - 8:00
3. "Intergalactic Space Crusaders" - 5:15
4. "Castle Hall" - 4:58
5. "The Eye of Ra" - 9:16
6. "Starchild" - 9:22
7. "The Two Gates" - 14:35

=== Bonus DVD features ===
- Photo gallery
- Behind the Scenes
- "Space Truckin’" (Rijssen)
- "Intergalactic Laxative" (Tilburg)
- "Dreamtime" with Edward Reekers (Tilburg)

The DVD also comes with two extra tracks: a keyboard and a bass solo.

== Personnel ==
- Sir Russell Allen - vocals
- Damian Wilson - vocals
- Robert Soeterboek - vocals
- Floor Jansen - vocals
- Arjen Anthony Lucassen - guitar
- Joost van den Broek - keyboards
- Peter Vink - bass
- Ed Warby - drums
- Irene Jansen - backing vocals

=== Special appearances ===
- Edward Reekers - vocals
- Ewa Albering - flute
