= Space Metal (Star One album) =

Studio album by Star One
- Released: 21 May 2002
- Recorded: The Electric Castle, Neijsembroughter, Netherlands
- Genre: Progressive metal; space rock
- Length: Disc 1: 55:45; Disc 2: 40:51; Total: 96:36
- Label: InsideOut
- Producer: Arjen Anthony Lucassen

Star One chronology
Space Metal (2002)	Live on Earth (2003)

Arjen Anthony Lucassen chronology
Fate of a Dreamer (2001)	Space Metal (2002)	Live on Earth (2003)

Professional ratings
Review scores
Source	Rating
AllMusic	3/5 stars

Space Metal is the debut studio album by Arjen Anthony Lucassen's progressive metal project/supergroup Star One, released on the recording label Inside Out in 2002. It was issued in two versions, a standard version containing just the first CD and a limited-edition version with more elaborate packaging and both CDs.

The album mixes progressive metal and space rock, and many of the songs are linked conceptually by having cult science fiction movies, novels or TV series as their subjects, mainly adventures on space. The album features a guest vocal performance by Dave Brock of Hawkwind on the track 'Hawkwind Medley'.

== Track listing ==
All music is composed by Lucassen.

CD 1
No.	Title	Length
1.	"Lift-Off"	1:14
2.	"Set Your Controls"	6:01
3.	"High Moon"	5:36
4.	"Songs of the Ocean"	5:23
5.	"Master of Darkness": A. "Master of Darkness"; B. "Laserfight"	5:14
6.	"The Eye of Ra": A. "Gateway to the Stars"; B. "The Eye of Ra"; C. "The Seventh Sign"	7:34
7.	"Sandrider"	5:31
8.	"Perfect Survivor"	4:46
9.	"Intergalactic Space Crusaders"	5:22
10.	"Starchild": A. "One by Four by Nine"; B. "Starchild"; C. "A New Sun"	9:04
Total length:		55:45

CD 2 (Special Edition only)
No.	Title	Length
1.	"Hawkwind Medley": A. "Master of the Universe"; B. "Silver Machine"; C. "Psychedelic Warlords (Disappear in Smoke)"; D. "Brainstorm"; E. "Assault and Battery"; F. "The War I Survived"; G. "Space is Deep"; H. "Spirit of the Age"; I. "Lost Chronicles"	9:46
2.	"Spaced Out"	4:53
3.	"Inseparable Enemies"	4:15
4.	"Space Oddity" (David Bowie cover)	4:59
5.	"Starchild" (Pro-Logic Mix)	9:31
6.	"Spaced Out" (Alternative version)	4:55
7.	"Intergalactic Laxative" (Hidden track; Donovan cover)	2:32
Total length:		40:51

== Album Themes ==
The themes of the album's songs are based on the following films and TV shows:

=== On CD 1 ===
- Set Your Controls – Doctor Who
- High Moon – Outland
- Songs of the Ocean – Star Trek IV: The Voyage Home
- Master of Darkness – The Empire Strikes Back
- The Eye of Ra – Stargate
- Sandrider – Dune
- Perfect Survivor – Alien
- Intergalactic Space Crusaders – Blake's 7
- Starchild – 2001: A Space Odyssey and 2010

=== On CD 2 ===
- Spaced Out – Dark Star
- Inseparable Enemies – Enemy Mine

== Personnel ==
=== Star One ===
- Arjen Anthony Lucassen – guitars, keyboards, hammond organ on all tracks, vocals in "Space Oddity" and "Intergalactic Laxative"
- Ed Warby – drums
- Russell Allen – vocals
- Damian Wilson – vocals
- Dan Swanö – vocals
- Floor Jansen – vocals

=== Additional musicians ===
- Dave Brock – vocals in "Hawkwind Medley"
- Jens Johansson – keyboards
- Erik Norlander – keyboards
- Robert Soeterboek – backing vocals
- Gary Wehrkamp – guitar

== Charts ==
2002 chart performance for Space Metal
Chart (2002)	Peak position
Dutch Albums (Album Top 100)	60
German Albums (Offizielle Top 100)	70

2022 chart performance for Space Metal
Chart (2022)	Peak position
Belgian Albums (Ultratop Flanders)	119
Swiss Albums (Schweizer Hitparade)	93
