= Northward (band) =

Dutch-Norwegian hard rock duo

- Genres: Hard rock
- Years active: 2007–2008, 2017–present
- Label: Nuclear Blast
- Members: Floor Jansen; Jørn Viggo Lofstad

Northward is a hard rock duo composed of Dutch vocalist Floor Jansen of Nightwish and Norwegian guitarist Jørn Viggo Lofstad of Pagan's Mind. The two created the project in 2007, writing an entire album worth of music in 2008 but being unable to record it due to label issues and their busy schedules; they ultimately reunited in 2017 to finally record the album, which was released on 19 October 2018 by Nuclear Blast.

Jansen stated that as both she and Lofstad are busy in their respective bands, Northward is a studio side-project and not a proper band, and that it would not perform live.

== History ==
=== Creation (2007–2008) ===
At the 2007 ProgPower USA festival, on which Jansen performed with her band After Forever and Lofstad performed with Pagan's Mind, the festival concluded with an "All Star Jam" featuring members of the bands who had performed at the festival, including Jansen and Lofstad. Back then, Jansen had the idea of taking a year off in 2008 so she could work on writing a heavy metal album, after spending the ten previous years doing progressive metal. Having been impressed by Lofstad at ProgPower, Jansen offered him to be involved in the project together, and the two wrote an entire album worth of music.

Jansen and Lofstad put together a line-up in 2008 and recorded the drums for the album, but, as they were about to sign a recording deal, After Forever disbanded (although they would only make it public in February 2009), and as the result, Jansen and Lofstad's recording deal was cancelled. Now in need of a new main band, Jansen decided to put their side-project on hold to focus on a new full-time band, which became ReVamp.

=== Failed reunion attempts (2008–2016) ===
The two tried to reunite during the following years, but difficulties on Jansen's part made it impossible: first, she suffered health issues in 2011 and a severe burnout which forced her to stop working and teaching, and to cancel the rest of ReVamp's tour, while also making it impossible to work with Lofstad after the tour; then, after recovering in 2012, she was asked by Nightwish to act as lead vocalist of their tour, before becoming a full member the following year. As the result, Jansen's schedule became very busy, and put Northward on hold once again as she was focusing her side activities on keeping ReVamp active.

=== Recording years (2016–present) ===
In 2016, ReVamp disbanded, as all members agreed that it would be better for all of them to focus on their own respective projects rather than waiting for Jansen to have free time from Nightwish. This finally gave Jansen free time to reunite Northward, as Nightwish was going to take a year off in 2017; her pregnancy made recording uncertain once again, but the two managed to finally complete the album before Jansen resumed touring with Nightwish in March 2018.

The backup band for the album consists of bassist Morty Black of TNT, drummers Jango Nilsen and Stian Kristoffersen, and keyboardist Ronny Tegner, the latter two also being members of Pagan's Mind. The album is mixed and mastered by Volbeat producer Jacob Hansen. It features a duet between Jansen and her sister Irene on the song "Drifting Islands".

== Reception ==
Northward's self-titled debut album earned positive reviews. Devils Gate Media praised the variety in Jansen's singing and Lofstad's guitar work. Blogger Man of Much Metal rated the album 8.5 out of 10, stating that "whilst this kind of rock music isn’t my usual fare, I cannot deny that this is a very striking record with plenty of positives that ensure that I enjoy the experience of listening to it." The album was a listener pick for best album of the year on Chicago Public Radio's Sound Opinions.

== Members ==
- Floor Jansen – vocals
- Jørn Viggo Lofstad – guitars

=== Guest musicians ===
- Morty Black – bass
- Jango Nilsen – drums
- Stian Kristoffersen – drums
- Irene Jansen – co-lead vocals on "Drifting Islands"
- Ronny Tegner – keyboards

== Discography ==
- Northward (2018)

== Music videos ==
- "While Love Died" (2018)
- "Get What You Give" (2018)
- "Storm in a Glass" (2018)
