= Ayreon =

Dutch progressive rock/metal project

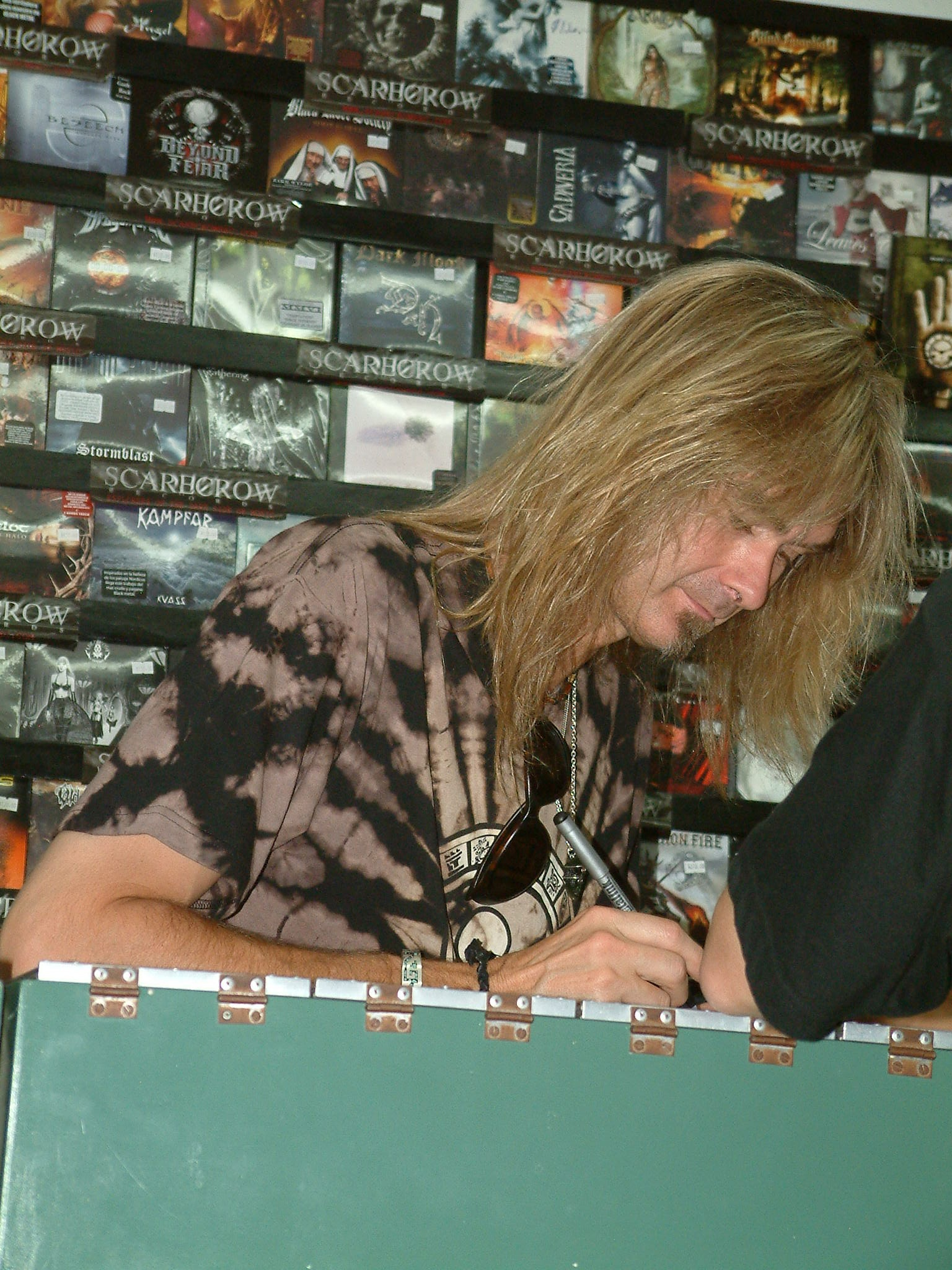
- Arjen Anthony Lucassen, the main creative force behind Ayreon

Background information
- Origin: Waalwijk, North Brabant, Netherlands
- Genres: Progressive rock; progressive metal; power metal
- Years active: 1995–2008; 2012–present
- Labels: Transmission; Inside Out; Century Media; SPV; Mascot Label Group
- Members: Arjen Anthony Lucassen
- Past members: Guest performers
- Website: ayreon.com

Ayreon /ˈɛriən/ is a musical project by Dutch songwriter, singer, musician and record producer Arjen Anthony Lucassen. Ayreon's music is described as progressive rock, progressive metal and power metal sometimes combined with genres such as folk, electronica, experimental and classical music. The majority of Ayreon's albums are dubbed "rock operas" (or "metal operas") because the albums contain complex storylines featuring a host of characters, each represented by a unique vocalist.

Each Ayreon album tells a different story, but all, except Actual Fantasy, The Theory of Everything, and Transitus, take place in the same fictional, science fiction universe. Lucassen's solo album Lost in the New Real is also set in the Ayreon universe. Ayreon's music is characterized by the use of traditional instruments in rock music (guitars, bass guitar, drums, analogue synthesizers, electric organs) mixed with instruments more native to folk and classical music (e.g. mandolins, violins, violas, celli, flutes, sitars and didgeridoos). Lucassen writes the music and the lyrics, sings and plays most of the instruments on all of the Ayreon albums, alongside many guest musicians. His most regular collaborator is drummer Ed Warby.

Due to the project's particular nature, Ayreon live performances are rare. Several Ayreon songs were first included in two live albums by other Lucassen bands: Live on Earth by Star One (2003) and Live in the Real World by Stream of Passion (2006).

== History ==
=== Origins: The Final Experiment and Actual Fantasy (1995–1998) ===
The first Ayreon CD, released in 1995, is The Final Experiment, which has a mixture of science fiction and medieval themes. The album features thirteen singers and seven instrumentalists, most of them Dutch. The Final Experiment is often mentioned as one of the first metal operas. The album was titled Ayreon: The Final Experiment, with the artist listed as Arjen Lucassen, but upon re-release, the title was changed to The Final Experiment, and the artist was changed to Ayreon.

Actual Fantasy from 1996 is the only Ayreon album without a continuous story. With its individual fantasy stories, it can still be considered a concept album, though. There are only three singers and three instrumentalists on Actual Fantasy. Themes inspired by songs on this album can be found on later Ayreon releases, particularly the two Universal Migrator albums. The album did not sell as well as its predecessor.

=== Continuation of the Ayreon storyline (1998–2008) ===
The double album Into the Electric Castle followed in 1998, continuing the Ayreon storyline from The Final Experiment. The album features eight singers, each playing a role of a single character, and eleven instrumentalists. Arjen has stated that he wanted this particular album to be a more flight-and-fancy-free record, or "pure escapism" than the previous albums' more serious tones, and portrayed his characters in more of a B movie light. The album was a success and is regarded as one of Ayreon's best.

The twin Universal Migrator albums were released in 2000. The first album, The Dream Sequencer consists of soft, atmospheric progressive rock, whereas the second album, Flight of the Migrator, consists of a more heavy-metal theme. Both of the albums feature around ten singers supported by many instrumentalists. One of the more notable guests was Bruce Dickinson of Iron Maiden, who made an appearance on the Flight of the Migrator album.

Shortly following Universal Migrator came Ayreonauts Only, an album meant for diehard Ayreon fans. The album itself was the second to not follow a specific storyline; it instead contained alternate versions (With different vocalists or instrumentalists) of existing songs, or the original demos used when recording them. In addition, it contained a preview of Arjen's then-upcoming project, Ambeon. It is the only Ayreon album not to see re-release on InsideOut.

In 2004 came The Human Equation. As on Into the Electric Castle, there are several singers, each playing their own role. With The Human Equation, Ayreon turned away from science fiction and fantasy, opting for a psychological theme.

Starting in 2004, after changing from Transmission Records to InsideOut, Arjen began rereleasing his Ayreon catalog on the new label, with enhancements ranging from basic (The Universal Migrator, issued as a two-disc set instead of two separate albums) to drastic (Actual Fantasy, "Revisited" with re-recorded drums, bass, synth and flute). In 2005, to coincide with the 10th anniversary of Ayreon, The Final Experiment was reissued with a bonus semi-acoustic disc.

At the end of September 2006, when Arjen's new studio was finished, he began making a new album entitled 01011001, which was released on 23 January 2008. This album was darker than previous Ayreon releases, Lucassen attributes this to a depression and his divorce in the preceding year.

On 25 April 2008, Arjen released a new Ayreon EP named Elected. The EP features two tracks from 01011001, one from The Human Equation and an Alice Cooper cover (Elected), with vocals by Arjen and Tobias Sammet.

On 16 September 2008, Arjen announced in his official website the release of Timeline, his second compilation album, that will reunite selected songs from all Ayreon albums and an unreleased one in three CDs and a DVD. The album was released on 7 November 2008 in Germany, Austria and Switzerland and all of the EU on 17 November 2008. It was released in America on 13 January 2009.

=== Hiatus (2008–2012) ===
Arjen took a break from Ayreon and completed a new side project, Guilt Machine, in 2009. He also went on to release a second Star One album in 2010, and then a solo album under his own name in 2012.

=== The Theory of Everything and The Source (2012–2017) ===
The Theory of Everything was released on 28 October 2013. In 2015, The Human Equation was performed in its entirety live in an unofficial full-scale theatrical production called The Theater Equation, with Lucassen making an appearance and helping promote the project. It was performed four times, all at the Nieuwe Luxor theater in Rotterdam between 18 and 20 September. Although produced as an unofficial series of performances, it was recorded and released in June of the following year as an official Ayreon release, The Theater Equation, produced and mixed by Lucassen himself.

The Source was released on 28 April 2017, marking a return to science fiction and the Ayreon storyline. It is Lucassen's first album under his new label, Mascot Label Group.

=== Focus on live performances (2017–2020) ===
In November 2016, Lucassen announced the first ever official Ayreon concerts for September 2017, entitled Ayreon Universe. The show featured 16 singers and 11 instrumentalists, all of whom had worked together with Lucassen on his studio albums. Unlike The Theater Equation, it consisted of unrelated songs from Ayreon performed after each other as in a traditional concert, with a few songs from Star One featured as well. One of the performances was released as a live album/DVD on 30 March 2018, titled Ayreon Universe – The Best of Ayreon Live.

On 7 December 2017, Lucassen stated that a new Ayreon concert would take place on 22 June 2018 at Graspop Metal Meeting, where they would headline the Marquee stage. It featured the same instrumentalists as the Ayreon Universe shows and most of its vocalists, along with Simone Simons and Tom S. Englund, who had never performed live with Ayreon before, and Mark Jansen, who had never collaborated with Lucassen before, and Barry Hay; Lucassen himself also performed a few songs.

Between 13 and 15 September 2019, the album Into the Electric Castle was performed in Tilburg in its entirety, similar to The Theater Equation in 2015, this time as official Ayreon performances. Fish, Anneke van Giersbergen, Damian Wilson, Edward Reekers, Edwin Balogh, and George Oosthoek returned from the original cast, alongside Ed Warby and flutist Thijs van Leer, who also performed on the original album. Simone Simons and Mark Jansen of Epica, Praying Mantis singer John Jaycee Cuijpers, Marcela Bovio, Bovio's husband and VUUR bassist Johan van Stratum, and Ex Libris members Dianne van Giersbergen and Bob Wijtsma were also featured, with actor John de Lancie acting as narrator. One of the performances was released as the live album Electric Castle Live and Other Tales on 27 March 2020.

Ayreon was supposed to headline the Night of the Prog Festival in Germany on 18 July 2020 to perform Into the Electric Castle once again, however the event was cancelled due to the COVID-19 pandemic.

=== Transitus and continued live performances (2020–present) ===
On 8 May 2020, Lucassen revealed on his YouTube channel that his next album would be an Ayreon album, titled Transitus and to be released the same year; the album would be released alongside a tie-in comic book.

On 13 May 2020, he announced the first member of the cast, actor Tom Baker, providing spoken vocals as the character of "The Storyteller". The rest of the cast was announced during the following week, also including Tommy Karevik of Kamelot and Seventh Wonder as the lead character of Daniel, Cammie Gilbert of Oceans of Slumber as Abby, Micheal "Mike" Mills of Toehider as The Statue, Amanda Somerville as Lavinia, Paul Manzi of Arena and The Sweet as Henry, Dianne van Giersbergen of Ex Libris as The Soprano, Threshold drummer Johanne James as Abraham, Simone Simons of Epica as The Angel of Death, and Dee Snider of Twisted Sister as Daniel's Father; Marcela Bovio of MaYaN (and Lucassen's former band Stream of Passion) and Caroline Westendorp of The Charm the Fury portray a duo of characters known as the Furies.

Featured musicians include Joe Satriani and former Megadeth member Marty Friedman on lead guitars and YouTube musician Patty Gurdy on the hurdy-gurdy. Keyboardist Joost van den Broek, violinist Ben Mathot, and flutist Jeroen Goossens, all of whom had been featured on every Ayreon album since 2008's 01011001, are also returning. Juan van Emmerloot acted as drummer, making Transitus Ayreon's second album after 2000's Universal Migrator Part 1: The Dream Sequencer not to have Ed Warby on drums, as Lucassen stated that he did not conceive Transitus as an Ayreon album, and felt like it would need a different style of drummer. Although they had long lost track of each other, he and Van Emmerloot had worked together 35 years prior, when Lucassen was part of Vengeance and Van Emmerloot was a session drummer; after becoming curious about what had happened to Van Emmerloot since their last meeting, Lucassen looked his drumming videos on YouTube and realized he would be a perfect fit for Transitus.

Transitus was released on 25 September 2020.

On 13 October 2022, Lucassen announced more Ayreon concerts in September 2023 in Tilburg, in which the studio album 01011001 was performed in its entirety. The shows were recorded for a live album titled 01011001 - Live Beneath the Waves, which was released on 17 May 2024.

== Etymology ==
Lucassen said, "Though I do like the similarity of the sound of my own name Arjen and the project name Ayreon, this is purely coincidental. Yet no one seems to believe that! Originally I called the leading character of the first Ayreon album 'Aries'. But then I had to change it because it had to fit the meter of the song. I wanted the new name to sound old fashioned because of the medieval influences, so I used the old-English sounding 'AY' (Aylesbury, Ayrshire). But I also wanted it to sound modern because of the futuristic parts ("2084") so I used 'ON' (electron, neutron, etc.), hence 'Ayreon'."

== Most regular collaborators ==
- Ed Warby – drums, percussion (1998–present)
- Joost van den Broek – piano, synthesizer (2004–present)
- Jeroen Goossens – flutes (2004–present)
- Ben Mathot – violin (2007–present)
- Johan van Stratum – bass guitar (2015–present) (Live shows)

For guest members, see List of Ayreon guest musicians.

== Discography ==
=== Studio albums ===
Title	Album details	Peak chart positions									Sales
Title	Album details	GER	FRA	AUT	SWI	SWE	NOR	NLD	BEL (WA)	BEL (FL)	Sales
The Final Experiment	Released: 27 October 1995; Label: Transmission, Inside Out Music, SPV; Formats: CD	—	—	—	—	—	—	—	—	—	
Actual Fantasy	Released: 23 October 1996; Label: Transmission, Inside Out Music, SPV; Formats: CD	—	—	—	—	—	—	—	—	—	
Into the Electric Castle	Released: 30 August 1998; Label: Transmission, Inside Out Music, SPV; Formats: CD, digital download	—	—	—	—	—	—	49	—	—	
Universal Migrator Part 1: The Dream Sequencer	Released: 20 June 2000; Label: Transmission, Inside Out Music, SPV; Formats: CD, digital download	90	—	—	—	—	—	64	—	—	
Universal Migrator Part 2: Flight of the Migrator	Released: 20 July 2000; Label: Transmission, Inside Out Music, SPV; Formats: CD, digital download	87	—	—	—	—	—	61	—	—	
The Human Equation	Released: 25 May 2004; Label: Inside Out Music; Formats: CD, digital download	50	160	—	—	—	—	1	—	—	
01011001	Released: 23 January 2008; Label: Inside Out Music; Formats: CD, digital download	18	90	—	85	54	—	2	96	80	
The Theory of Everything	Released: 28 October 2013; Label: Inside Out Music; Formats: CD, digital download	21	—	37	41	46	26	3	36	58	US: 2,790+
The Source	Released: 28 April 2017; Label: Mascot Label Group	10	95	21	17	27	21	1	36	38	
Transitus	Released: 25 September 2020; Label: Music Theories Recordings	15	161	39	11	—	33	1	142	42	
"—" denotes a recording that did not chart or was not released in that territory.

=== EPs ===
Title	EP details
Elected	Released: 25 April 2008; Label: Inside Out Music; Formats: CD, digital download

=== Singles ===
Title	Year	Peak chart positions	Album
Title	Year	NLD	Album
"Sail Away to Avalon"	1995	—	The Final Experiment
"The Stranger from Within"	1996	—	Actual Fantasy
"Temple of the Cat"	2000	—	Universal Migrator Part 1: The Dream Sequencer
"Day Eleven: Love"	2004	39	The Human Equation
"Loser"	2004	—	The Human Equation
"Come Back to Me"	2005	—	The Human Equation
"Hopelessly Slipping Away"	2020	—	Transitus
"Get Out! Now!"	2020	—	Transitus
"This Human Equation"	2020	—	Transitus
"Talk of the Town"	2020	—	Transitus
"—" denotes a recording that did not chart or was not released in that territory.

=== Compilation albums ===
Title	Album details
Ayreonauts Only	Released: 12 December 2000; Label: Transmission; Formats: CD
Timeline	Released: 7 November 2008; Label: Inside Out Music; Formats: CD

=== Live albums ===
Title	Album details
The Theater Equation	Released: 17 June 2016; Label: Inside Out Music; Formats: CD+DVD
Ayreon Universe – The Best of Ayreon Live	Released: 30 March 2018; Label: Music Theories Recordings/Mascot Label Group; Formats: CD+DVD
Electric Castle Live and Other Tales	Released: 27 March 2020; Label: Music Theories Recordings/Mascot Label Group; Formats: CD+DVD
01011001 - Live Beneath the Waves	Released: 17 May 2024; Label: Music Theories Recordings/Mascot Label Group; Formats: CD+DVD
30th Anniversary - An Amazing Flight Through Time	Released: 5 June 2026; Label: Music Theories Recordings/Mascot Label Group; Formats: CD+DVD & Blu-ray

=== Music videos ===
- "The Stranger From Within" (1996)
- "Day Eleven: Love" (2004)
- "Loser" (2004)
- "Come Back to Me" (2004)
- "Beneath the Waves" (2008)
- "The Day That the World Breaks Down" (2017)
- "Get Out!" (2020)
- "This Human Equation" (2020)
- "Hopelessly Slipping Away" (2020)
- "Talk of the Town" (2020)
- "Daniel's Descent into Transitus Medley" ("Listen to My Story") (2020)

== See also ==
- Ambeon
- Guilt Machine
- Star One
- Stream of Passion
- The Gentle Storm
