= Transitus (album) =

Studio album by Ayreon
- Released: 25 September 2020
- Genre: Progressive metal; progressive rock
- Length: 80:47
- Label: Music Theories Recordings; Mascot Label Group
- Producer: Arjen Anthony Lucassen

Ayreon chronology
The Source (2017)	Transitus (2020)

Singles from Transitus
- 1. "Get Out! Now!" Released: 16 July 2020; 2. "Hopelessly Slipping Away" Released: 16 July 2020

Professional ratings
Review scores
Source	Rating
Angry Metal Guy	3.5/5 stars
Metal Hammer	3.5/5 stars
Prog Radio	3/5 stars

Transitus is the tenth studio album by the Dutch progressive rock/metal band Ayreon. It was released on 25 September 2020. The album is accompanied by a 25 page comic book, not included with CD or vinyl, and illustrated by Felix Vega.

The album's plot is one of the few not connected to the main Ayreon storyline; instead, it presents a sci-fi/gothic horror story partially set in the 19th century.

A total of five music videos were released for the album. The two first came out on 16 July 2020 for the singles "Get Out! Now!" and "Hopelessly Slipping Away". The former covers the part in the story in which protagonist Daniel (Tommy Karevik) is banished from his house by his father (Dee Snider) for having an affair with their servant Abby (Cammie Gilbert). The song features a guitar solo by Joe Satriani. The other song follows Daniel's ghost as he tries to contact Abby, who can't hear nor see him but does feel his presence.

On 3 September, a video for "This Human Equation" featuring Simone Simons was released. According to Ayreon's mastermind Arjen Anthony Lucassen, it contains several references to the project's universe, besides the title, which alludes to their sixth album. On 17 September, a lyric video for "Talk of the Town" was released, featuring images of Paul Manzi performing as Henry and studio footage of the instrumentalists recording their parts. The final video, titled "Daniel’s Descent into Transitus Medley", was released on 1 October featuring Simons, Karevik, Marcela Bovio and Caroline Westendorp (the latter two as the Furies).

== Track listing ==
All tracks are written by Arjen Anthony Lucassen and Tom Baker (narrations)

CD 1
No.	Title	Length
1.	"Fatum Horrificum": I. "Graveyard"; II. "1884"; III. "Daniel and Abby"; IV. "Fatum"; V. "Why?!"; VI. "Guilty"	10:23: 1:20; 2:17; 1:33; 1:30; 1:08; 2:35
2.	"Daniel's Descent into Transitus"	2:40
3.	"Listen to My Story"	4:03
4.	"Two Worlds Now One"	4:06
5.	"Talk of the Town"	5:21
6.	"Old Friend"	1:41
7.	"Dumb Piece of Rock"	4:13
8.	"Get Out! Now!"	5:03
9.	"Seven Days, Seven Nights"	1:27
Total length:		38:55

CD 2
No.	Title	Length
1.	"Condemned Without a Trial"	3:50
2.	"Daniel's Funeral"	4:58
3.	"Hopelessly Slipping Away"	4:28
4.	"This Human Equation"	4:19
5.	"Henry's Plot"	2:19
6.	"Message from Beyond"	5:21
7.	"Daniel's Vision"	1:45
8.	"She Is Innocent"	2:09
9.	"Lavinia's Confession"	1:53
10.	"Inferno"	2:17
11.	"Your Story Is Over!"	2:42
12.	"Abby in Transitus"	3:02
13.	"The Great Beyond"	2:49
Total length:		41:46

== Personnel ==
Credits adapted from the album's media notes.

Vocalists

- Tom Baker (actor for Doctor Who) – The Storyteller
- Tommy Karevik (Kamelot, Seventh Wonder) – Daniel
- Cammie Gilbert (Oceans of Slumber) – Abby
- Johanne James (Kyrbgrinder, drummer for Threshold) – Abraham
- Simone Simons (Epica) – The Angel of Death
- Marcela Bovio (ex-Stream of Passion) – Fury, Servant, Villager
- Caroline Westendorp (ex-The Charm the Fury) – Fury, Servant, Villager
- Paul Manzi (ex-Arena) – Henry
- Michael Mills (Toehider) – The Statue
- Dee Snider (Twisted Sister) – Father
- Amanda Sommerville (Trillium, HDK) – Lavinia
- Dianne van Giersbergen (Ex Libris) – Soprano
- Dan J. Pierson, Jan Willem Ketelaers, Lisette van den Berg, Marjan Welman, Will Shaw, Wilmer Waarbroek – Villagers
- Hellscore – Choir (directed by Noa Gruman)

Instrumentalists

- Arjen Lucassen – Guitars, Bass, Keyboards, Glockenspiel, Dulcimer, Toy Piano
- Joost van den Broek – Hammond Organ, Piano, Fender Rhodes
- Juan van Emmerloot – Drums
- Ben Mathot – Violin
- Jeroen Goossens – Flutes, Woodwinds
- Jurriaan Westerveld – Cello
- Alex Thyssen – French Horn
- Thomas Cochrane – Trumpet, Trombone
- Patty Gurdy – Hurdy Gurdy
- Joe Satriani – Guitar Solo on "Get Out! Now!"
- Marty Friedman – Guitar Solo on "Message From Beyond"

== Charts ==
=== Weekly charts ===
Weekly chart performance for Transitus
Chart (2020)	Peak position
Belgian Albums (Ultratop Flanders)	42
Belgian Albums (Ultratop Wallonia)	142
Dutch Albums (Album Top 100)	1
Finnish Albums (Suomen virallinen lista)	24
French Albums (SNEP)	161
German Albums (Offizielle Top 100)	15
Norwegian Albums (VG-lista)	33
Norwegian Vinyl Albums (VG-lista)	2
Spanish Albums (PROMUSICAE)	95
Swiss Albums (Schweizer Hitparade)	11

=== Year-end charts ===
Year-end chart performance for Transitus
Chart (2020)	Position
Dutch Albums (Album Top 100)	86
