= Headspace (band) =

English progressive metal band

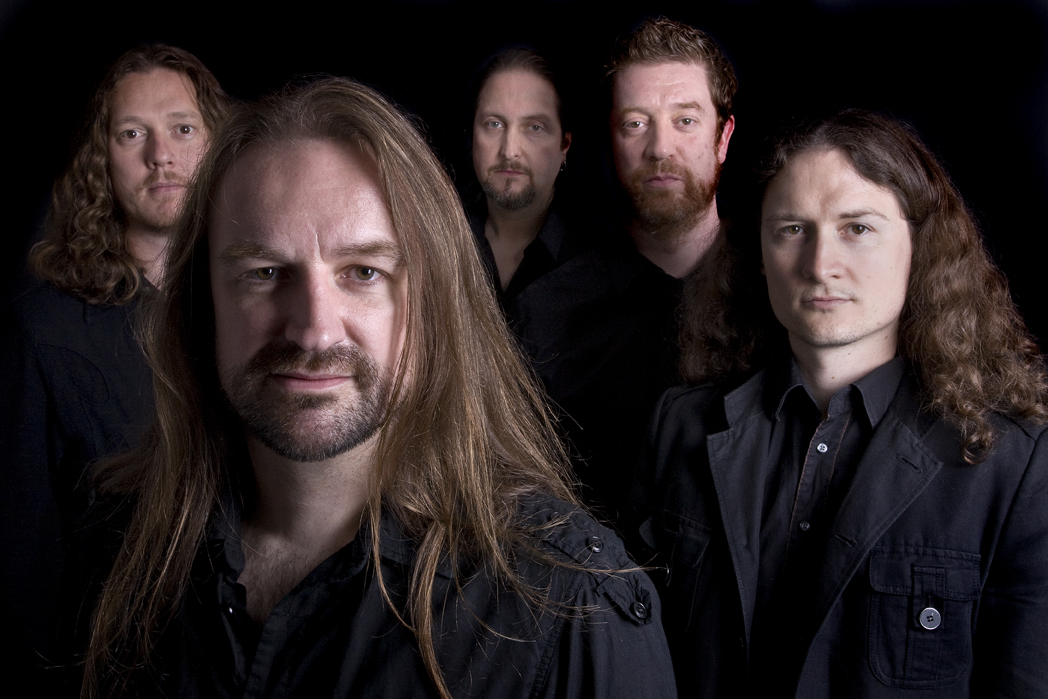
- Left to right: Adam Wakeman, Damian Wilson, Lee Pomeroy, Richard Brook and Pete Rinaldi

Background information
- Origin: England
- Genres: Progressive metal; progressive rock
- Years active: 2006–present
- Labels: Inside Out/Century Media
- Members: Damian Wilson; Pete Rinaldi; Lee Pomeroy; Adam Wakeman; Adam Falkner
- Past members: Rick Brook
- Website: headspaceonline.com

Headspace is an English progressive metal band formed in 2006 by keyboardist Adam Wakeman with former Threshold singer Damian Wilson. Wakeman was also a keyboardist in Ozzy Osbourne's band.

Their first release, an EP entitled I Am... coincided with their support shows with Osbourne on the European Leg of the Black Rain tour in 2007. Their debut concept album I Am Anonymous was released worldwide on 22 May 2012 on the Inside Out / Century Media label.

In November 2015, they announced a follow-up album, All That You Fear is Gone, which was released on 26 February 2016. It was their first release with drummer Adam Falkner. In January 2016, they released a song from the album: "Your Life Will Change".

== Members ==
- Damian Wilson – lead vocals (2006–present)
- Pete Rinaldi – guitars, backing vocals (2006–present)
- Lee Pomeroy – bass, Chapman stick, bass pedals, backing vocals (2006–present)
- Adam Wakeman – keyboards, backing vocals (2006–present)
- Adam Falkner – drums (2015–present)

former members

- Richard Brook – drums, percussion (2006–2015)

== Discography ==
- I Am... (EP, 2007)
- I Am Anonymous (2012)
- All That You Fear is Gone (2016)
