= VUUR =

Dutch progressive metal band

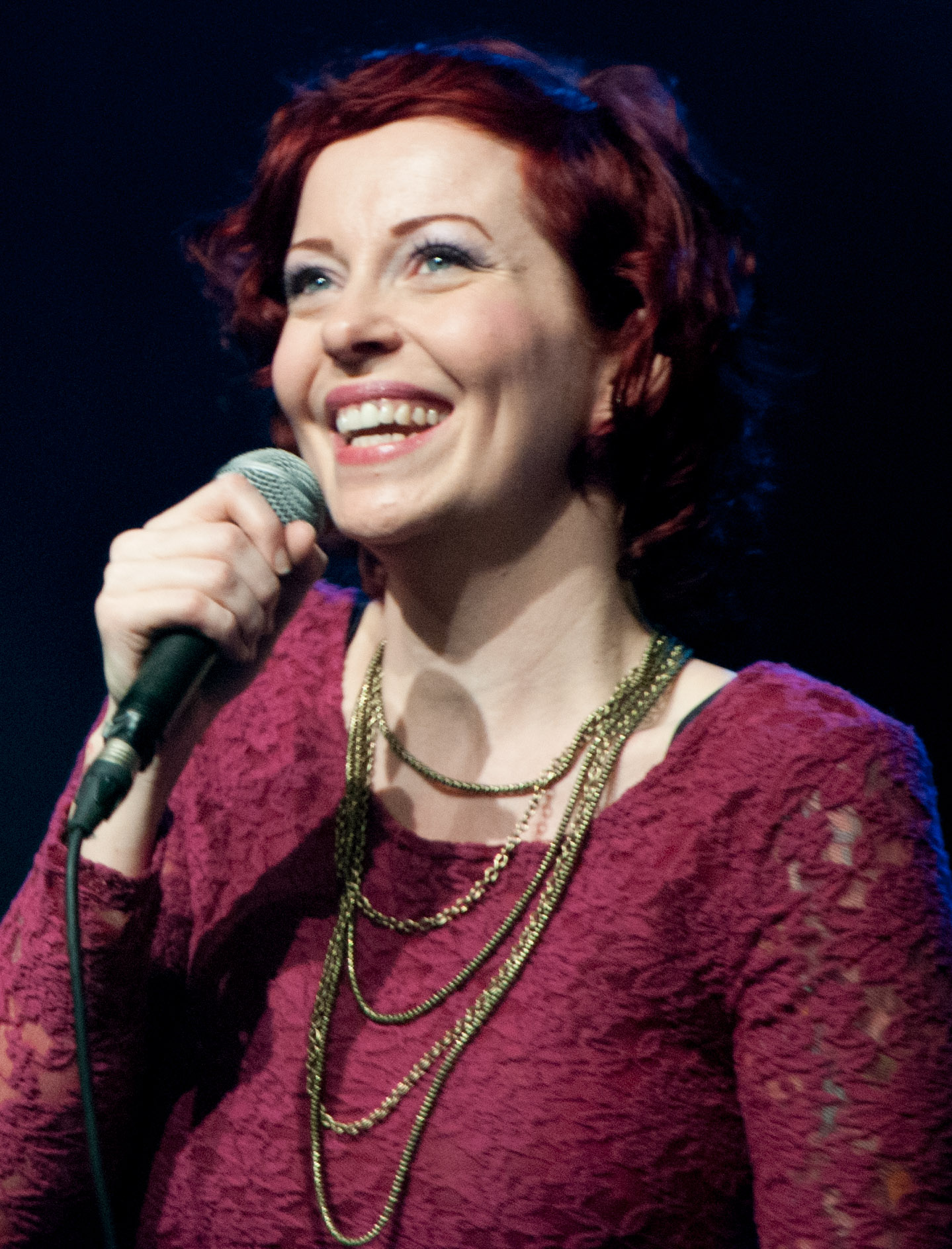
- Anneke van Giersbergen in 2014

Background information
- Origin: Netherlands
- Genres: Progressive metal
- Years active: 2016–present
- Label: Inside Out Music
- Members: Anneke van Giersbergen; Jord Otto; Ferry Duijsens; Johan van Stratum; Ed Warby
- Past members: Marcela Bovio
- Website: vuur.band

VUUR (Dutch pronunciation: [vyr]) ("fire", "passion" or "drive") is a Dutch progressive metal band formed in 2016 by singer and lyricist Anneke van Giersbergen and musicians she had worked with previously in bands like The Gentle Storm or her own solo band.

The band is intended to express van Giersbergen's heavy metal side, as opposed to the softer side of her solo career. They released their debut album In This Moment We Are Free – Cities in October 2017.

== History ==
Singer Marcela Bovio was initially part of the line-up. However, when the recording of the band's debut album started, Bovio and Van Giersbergen "wanted to take very different directions when it came to the sound and approach of the vocals". After failing to find a compromise that would satisfy both creatively, it was decided that Bovio would leave the band, as the two were afraid that doing otherwise would leave both regretful and hurt their friendship. Bovio made her departure official on 11 April 2017, stating "I'm truly devastated, because I'm a huge fan of Anneke and every single member of the band; they're all incredibly sweet people, as well as top notch musicians. Plus, the songs are so fantastic… this is going to be a revolutionary album! But I have to follow my heart and choose for what I think in the future will bring me (and the rest of the band) happiness, no matter how hard it feels right now. Anneke, Fer, Jord, Johan and Ed: you guys are THE BEST. I'd wish you luck but you don't need it, you are going to ROCK this world".

They released their debut album In This Moment We Are Free – Cities on 20 October 2017. Van Giersbergen was already writing songs for a second album in October 2017.

As of November 2019, the band is put on hold.

== Members ==
- Anneke van Giersbergen (ex-The Gathering, The Gentle Storm) – lead vocals, rhythm guitar
- Jord Otto (My Propane, ex-ReVamp) – guitars
- Ferry Duijsens (Anneke van Giersbergen) – guitars
- Johan van Stratum (Stream of Passion) – bass
- Ed Warby (Gorefest, Ayreon) – drums

=== Former member ===
- Marcela Bovio (Stream of Passion, ex-Elfonía) – vocals (2016–2017)

== Discography ==
Studio albums

- In This Moment We Are Free – Cities (2017)

Singles

- "The Mermaid and the Horseman" (2017)
