= Toehider =

Australian progressive rock band

Toehider are a progressive rock band from Melbourne, Australia that also identifies as a "collab project between musician and illustrator". Their influences include progressive rock, pop, hard rock, metal and folk.

Toehider was founded in 2008 by Michael Mills (the musician) and Andrew Saltmarsh (the illustrator). After the release of their debut EP Toe Hider in the same year, another twelve EPs were released from May 2009 to April 2010 as part of a 12in12 project, in which the release took place on the twelfth of each month for twelve consecutive months. During these recordings, the band experimented with different styles of music. The EPs were each provided with cover artwork and a 2-page comic by Andrew Saltmarsh (also known by his nickname, "Salt" or "Salty").

In 2011 the debut album To Hide Her was released, and in 2012 an EP Children of the Sun Part 2. The band's second album What Kind of Creature Am I? was released in 2014. They toured with the Protomen in 2013. In 2015 the EP Mainly Songs About Robots was recorded with Vinny Appice on drums and released in September of the same year.

The album I LIKE IT! was released in 2020, consisting of selected songs from a list of demos voted by the fans to be recorded for the album.

Michael Mills has guest-starred as a singer on the Ayreon albums The Theory of Everything, Transitus, and The Source, as well as on the live project Ayreon Universe.

== Discography ==
Album

- 2011: To Hide Her
  - Track Listing
    1. "Oh My God, He's an IDIOT" 03:31
    2. "The Most Popular Girl in School" 05:00
    3. "Daddy Issues" 06:18
    4. "In This Time" 02:47
    5. "To Hide Her" 05:45
    6. "There's a Ghost in the Lake" 06:57
    7. "Giants Who Walk With Man" 04:19
    8. "Everybody Knows Amy" 02:48
    9. "Fireside" 03:06
    10. "Aren't They Just Out Playing on the Swing?" 06:49
- 2014: What Kind of Creature Am I?
  - Track Listing
    1. "You and I Both Lose (But 5 Wins)" 5:00
    2. "Whatever Makes You Feel Superior" 6:17
    3. "The Thing With Me" 4:13
    4. "What Kind Of Creature AmI?" 4:18
    5. "Smash It Out" 2:04
    6. "Spoilt For Choice" 3:00
    7. "Whoa" 4:31
    8. "Under The Future, We Bury The Past" 7:07
    9. "Meet The Sloth" 12:34
    10. "Geese Lycan" 2:41
- 2017: Good
  - Track Listing
    1. "Good" 1:17
    2. "[funnythings]" 6:10
    3. "This Conversation is Over" 4:30
    4. "Millions of Musketeers" 4:34
    5. "How Do Ghosts Work?" 8:01
    6. "Dan VS Egg" 3:07
    7. "I've Been So Happy Living Down Here in the Water" 5:28
    8. "It's So Fikkis!" 4:29
- 2020: I Like It!
  - Track Listing
    1. "GO FULL BORE!" 4:04
    2. "wellgivit" 4:38
    3. "Rancorous Heart" 5:02
    4. "Moon and Moron" 6:20
    5. "Concerning Lix & Fairs" 6:34
    6. "The Ultimate Exalter" 5:06
    7. "Died of Dancing" 3:27
    8. "Bats Aren't Birds" 3:25
    9. "The Guy That No-One Really Knows" 6:24
    10. "He's There... And Then He Does THAT" 6:07
    11. "How Much For That Dragon Tooth?" 5:36
    12. "I LIKE IT!" 6:21
- 2022: I Have Little To No Memory of These Memories
  - Track Listing
    1. "I Have Little To No Memory of These Memories" 47:47

EPs

- 2008: Toe Hider
- 2009: Not Much of a Man
- 2009: Old, Old, Old
- 2009: Toehider Too!
- 2009: How Did Counterquistle Lose His Pyjamas
- 2009: Metaltarsus
- 2009: In All Honesty
- 2009: Under the Mistletoe
- 2010: 9
- 2010: Do You Believe in Monsters?
- 2010: Never Mind the Hallux
- 2010: Done and Dusted
- 2012: Children of the Sun Part 2: Another Collection of Under-appreciated Cartoon Themes from the 70's, 80's and 90's
- 2015: Mainly Songs About Robots
- 2023: Quit Forever?
- 2023: Snapshots From Beacontown Spring Dance '85
- 2023: The 4 Castles of Stelcoaryn
- 2023: Horse EP
- 2023: Take on a Tank
- 2024: Children of the Sun 3: A Collection of Cartoon Theme Songs from an Alternate Timeline in Which All Cartoons Are Duck-Themed
- 2024: Toad Hirer
- 2024: Stereo Night Ash: Music for Relaxation, Meditation, Decatastrophizing and Deep Sleep
- 2024: SPACE FAMOUS
- 2024: X
- 2024: Rediscovery
- 2024: Warts and All - Live in Chicago

Singles

- 2011: The Most Popular Girl in School
- 2012: Smash It Out
- 2013: All I Want for Christmas Is You (feat. Phoebe Pinnock, Mariah Carey Cover)
- 2013: Whatever Makes You Feel Superior
- 2014: Wuthering Heights (Kate Bush Cover)
- 2014: Whoa! (Bird's Robe Records)

Compilation

- 2010: 12 EPs in 12 Months - The First Six (EPs 1–6)
- 2010: 12 EPs in 12 Months - The Last Six (EPs 7–12)
- 2010: Best of the '12EPs in 12 months'
