= Universities and research institutions in Berlin =

Humboldt University of Berlin

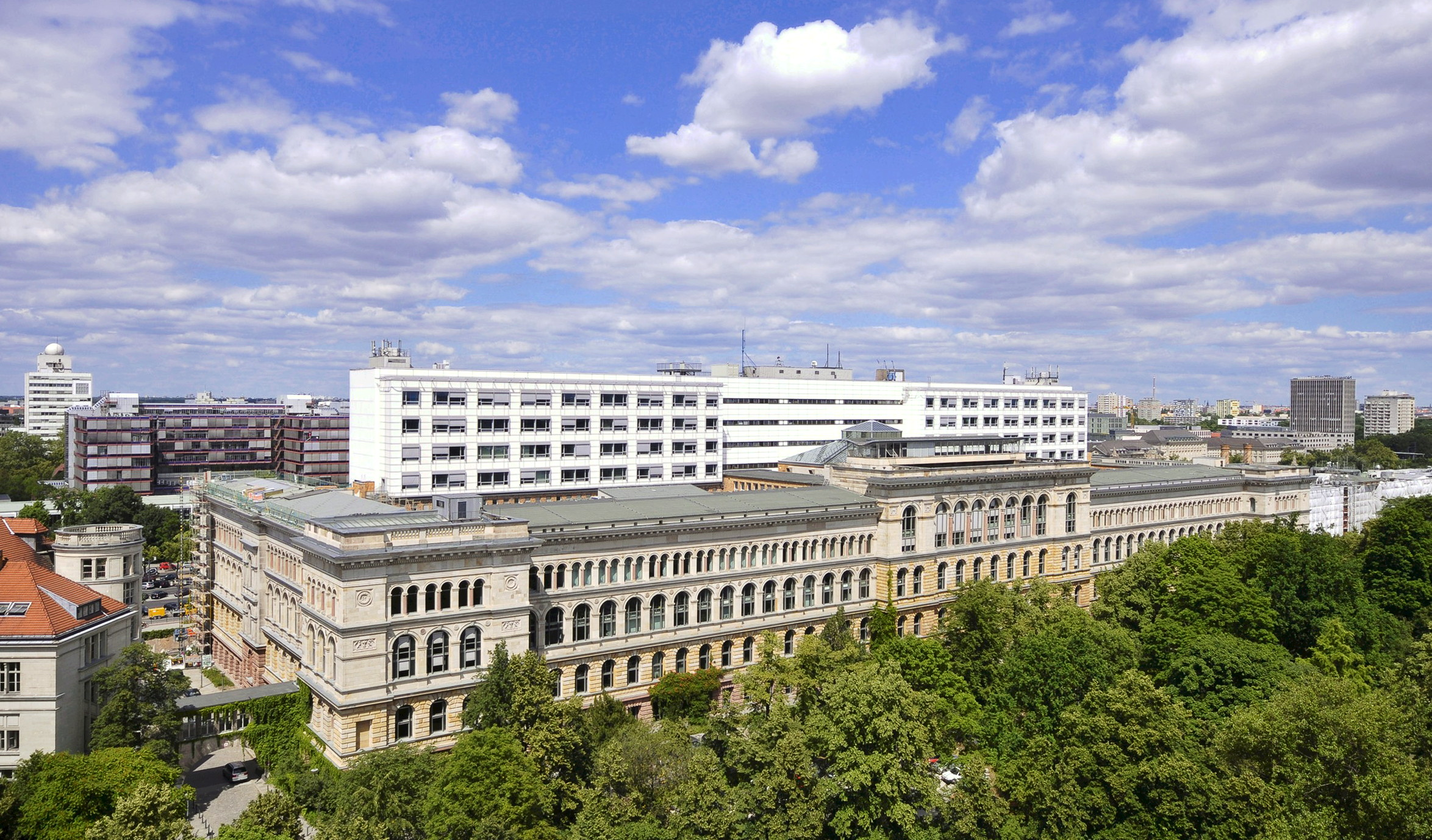
Main building of TU Berlin (south side)

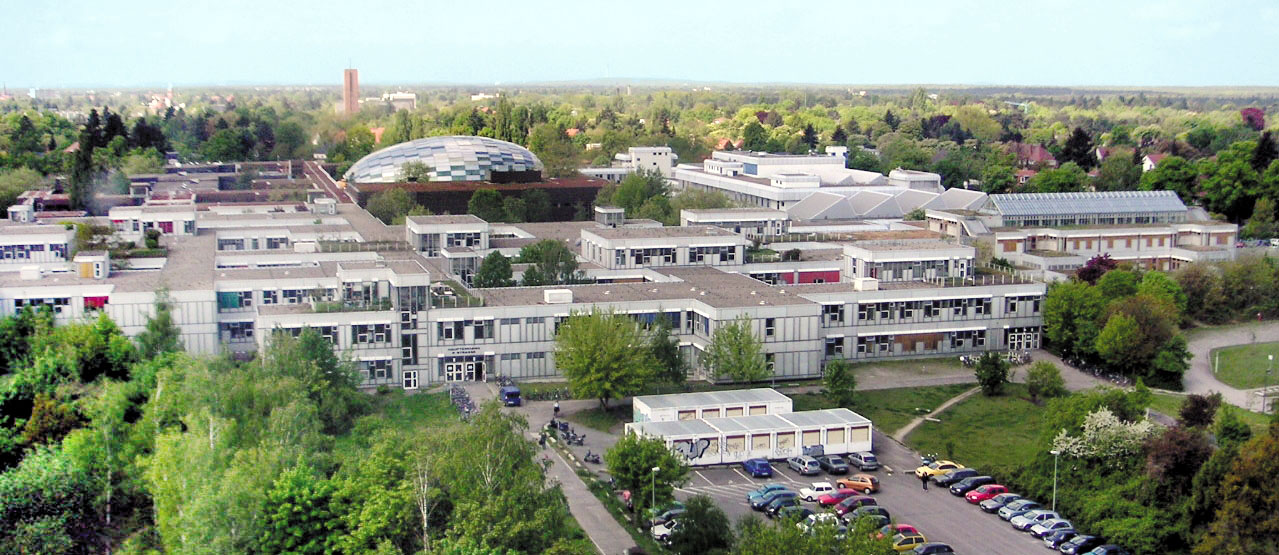
Freie Universität Berlin

The Berlin-Brandenburg capital region is one of the most prolific centers of higher education and research in the world. It is the largest concentration of universities and colleges in Germany. The city has four public research universities and 27 private, professional and technical colleges (Hochschulen), offering a wide range of disciplines. Access to the German university system is tuition free.

175,000 students were enrolled in the winter term of 2014/15. Around 20% have an international background. Student figures have grown by 50% in the last 15 years. The Humboldt Universität zu Berlin (HU Berlin) has 34,000 students, the Freie Universität Berlin (Free University of Berlin, FU Berlin) has 34,000 students, and the Technische Universität Berlin (TU Berlin) around 30,000 students. The Universität der Künste (UdK) has about 4,000 students and the Berlin School of Economics and Law has enrollment of about 10,000 students.

40 Nobel Prize winners are affiliated to the Berlin-based universities.

== History ==
The Prussian Academy of Arts (German: Preußische Akademie der Künste) was an art school set up in Berlin, Brandenburg, in 1694/1696 by prince-elector Frederick III, in personal union Duke Frederick I of Prussia, and later king in Prussia. It had a decisive influence on art and its development in the German-speaking world throughout its existence. It dropped 'Prussian' from its name in 1945 and was finally disbanded in 1955 after the 1954 foundation of two separate academies of art for East Berlin and West Berlin in 1954. Those two separate academies merged in 1993 to form Berlin's present-day Academy of Arts.

The Humboldt University of Berlin is one of Berlin's oldest universities, founded in 1810 as the University of Berlin (Universität zu Berlin) by the liberal Prussian educational reformer and linguist Wilhelm von Humboldt, whose university model has strongly influenced other European and Western universities.

== Universities ==
=== Public universities ===
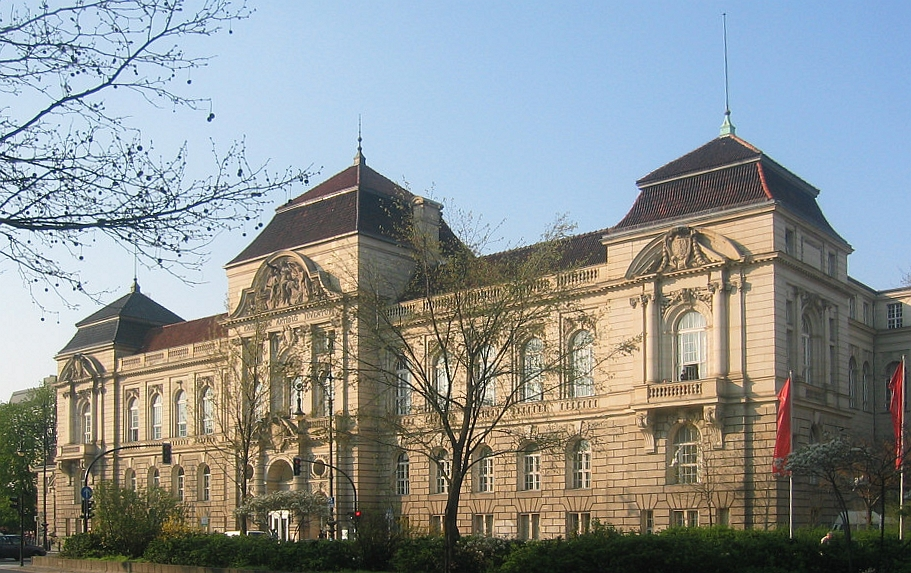
Universität der Künste Berlin

There are six large internationally renowned research universities in the Berlin-Brandenburg capital region:

- Free University of Berlin (FU Berlin), a German University of Excellence (Berlin University Alliance)
- Humboldt University of Berlin (HU Berlin), a German University of Excellence (Berlin University Alliance)
- The Charité is a medical school, one of the largest university hospitals in Europe and a German University of Excellence (Berlin University Alliance)
- Technische Universität Berlin (TU Berlin), a German University of Excellence (Berlin University Alliance)
- Berlin University of the Arts (UdK) is the largest art and design school in Europe
- University of Potsdam is situated in the southwestern part of the Berlin urban region

=== Private universities ===
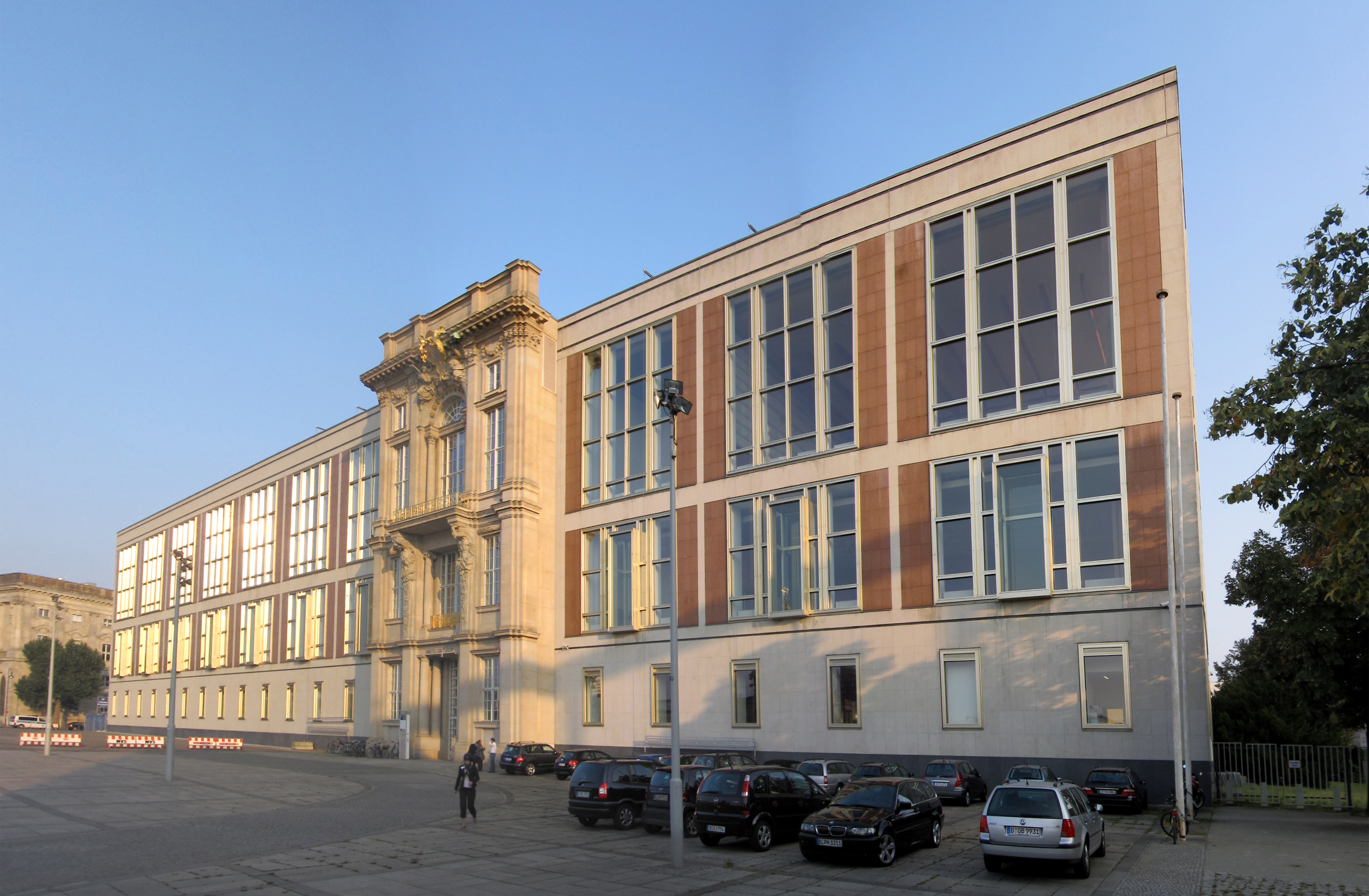
European School of Management and Technology Berlin

There are seven recognized private universities in Berlin:

- ESCP Europe Wirtschaftshochschule Berlin
- Hertie School
- MSB Medical School Berlin
- Steinbeis-Hochschule Berlin
- ESMT European School of Management and Technology
- International Psychoanalytic University Berlin

=== Universities of applied sciences ===
Berlin has several public or private universities of applied sciences (Hochschulen für angewandte Wissenschaften):

- Alice Salomon Hochschule Berlin (public)
- Bard College Berlin
- Berlin International University of Applied Sciences
- Berlin School of Economics and Law (public)
- Berufsakademie Berlin
- Berlin University of Applied Sciences and Technology (public)
- CODE University of Applied Sciences
- design akademie berlin, SRH Hochschule für Kommunikation und Design
- German Academy for Film and Television Berlin
- Evangelische Fachhochschule
- Hochschule für Technik und Wirtschaft Berlin (public)
- Fachhochschule für Verwaltung und Rechtspflege Berlin

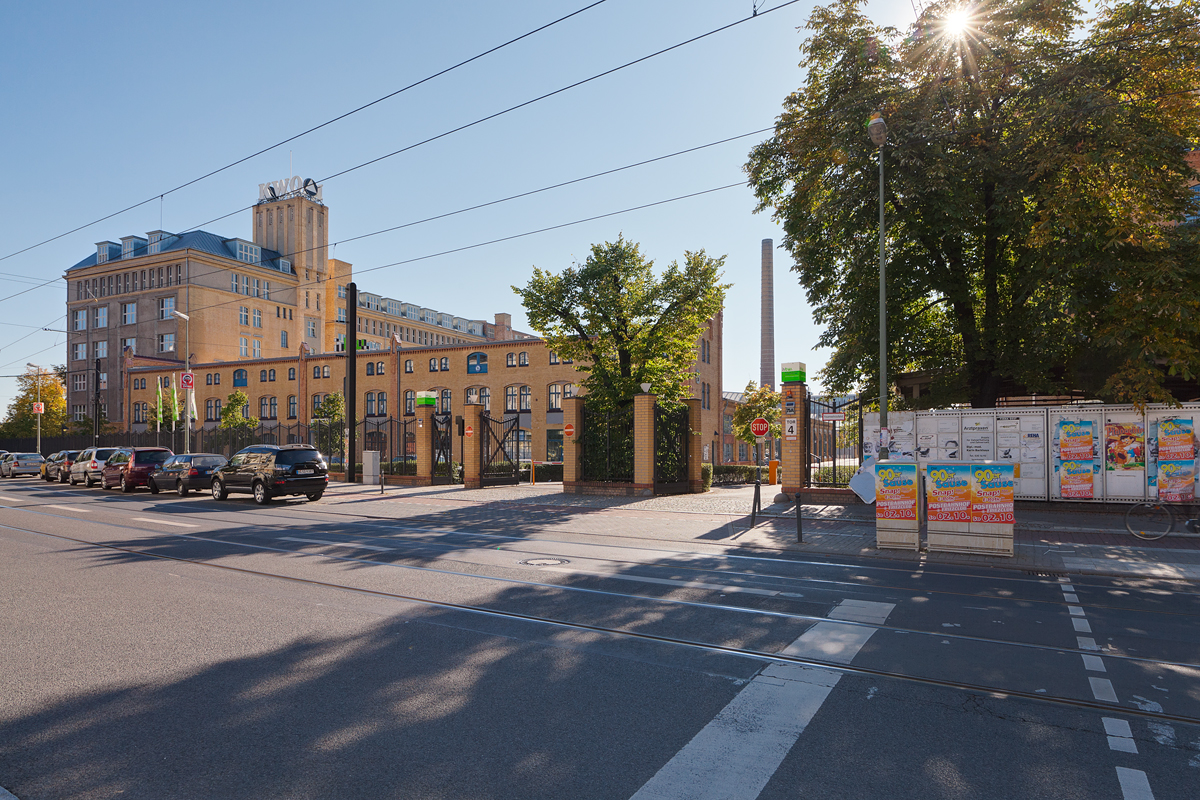
Hochschule für Technik und Wirtschaft Berlin

- Hochschule für Musik Hanns Eisler (public)
- Hochschule für Schauspielkunst „Ernst Busch“ (public)
- International Business School
- Katholische Fachhochschule
- Katholische Hochschule für Sozialwesen Berlin
- Weißensee Academy of Art Berlin (public)
- Mediadesign Hochschule
- OTA private University of applied sciences Berlin (OTA Hochschule Berlin)
- Teikyo University, Berlin campus
- Touro College Berlin

== Research institutions ==
Berlin has a high density of research institutions, such as the Fraunhofer Society, the Leibniz Association, the Helmholtz Association, and the Max Planck Society, which are independent of, or only loosely connected to its universities. A total number of around 65,000 scientists are working in research and development in 2012. The city is one of the centers of knowledge and innovation communities (Future Information and Communication Society and Climate Change Mitigation and Adaptation) of the European Institute of Innovation and Technology (EIT).

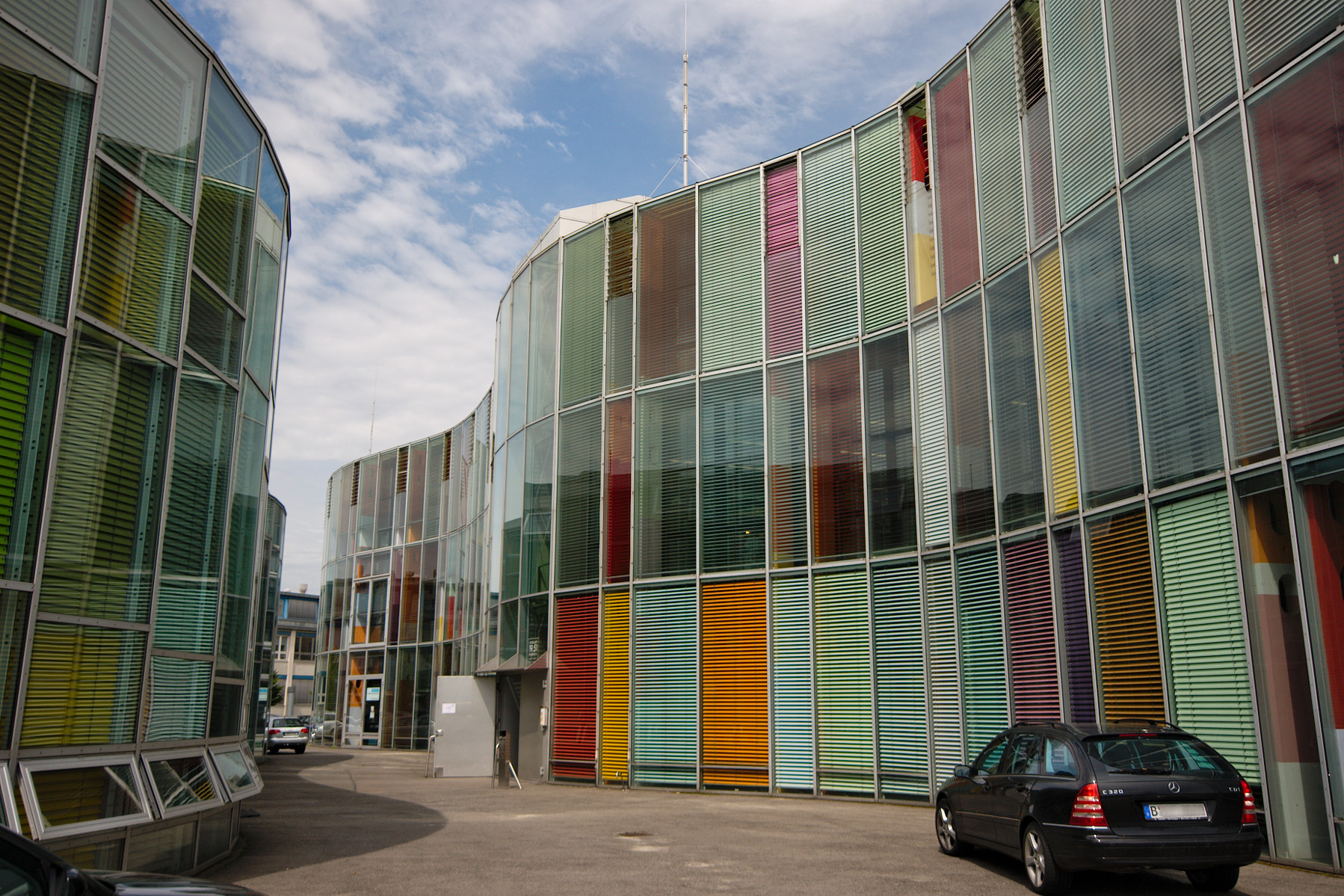
The Photonics Center at the Science and Technology Park in Adlershof

- Berlin-Brandenburgische Akademie der Wissenschaften
- Biologische Bundesanstalt für Land- und Forstwirtschaft
- Bundesanstalt für Materialforschung und -prüfung (BAM)
- Bundesinstitut für Risikobewertung
- Telekom Innovation Laboratories (affiliated with TU Berlin)
- German Archaeological Institute (DAI)
- Deutsches Bibliotheksinstitut
- Deutsches Herzzentrum Berlin
- Deutsches Institut für Urbanistik
- Ecologic gGmbH
- Fachinformationszentrum Chemie
- Institute for Cultural Inquiry
- Institute of Electronic Business
- Zuse Institute Berlin (ZIB)
- Otto Suhr Institute for Political Science (OSI) of the Freie Universität Berlin
- Physikalisch-Technische Bundesanstalt (PTB)
- Robert Koch Institute (RKI)
- Socio-Economic Panel (SOEP)
- Umweltbundesamt
- Wissenschaftskolleg zu Berlin - Institute for Advanced Study, Berlin
- Wissenschaftszentrum Berlin für Sozialforschung
- Wissenschafts- und Wirtschaftsstandort Adlershof
- Institut für Museumskunde
- Institut für Ökologische Wirtschaftsforschung gGmbH
- Institute for Media and Communication Policy

=== Leibniz Institutes ===
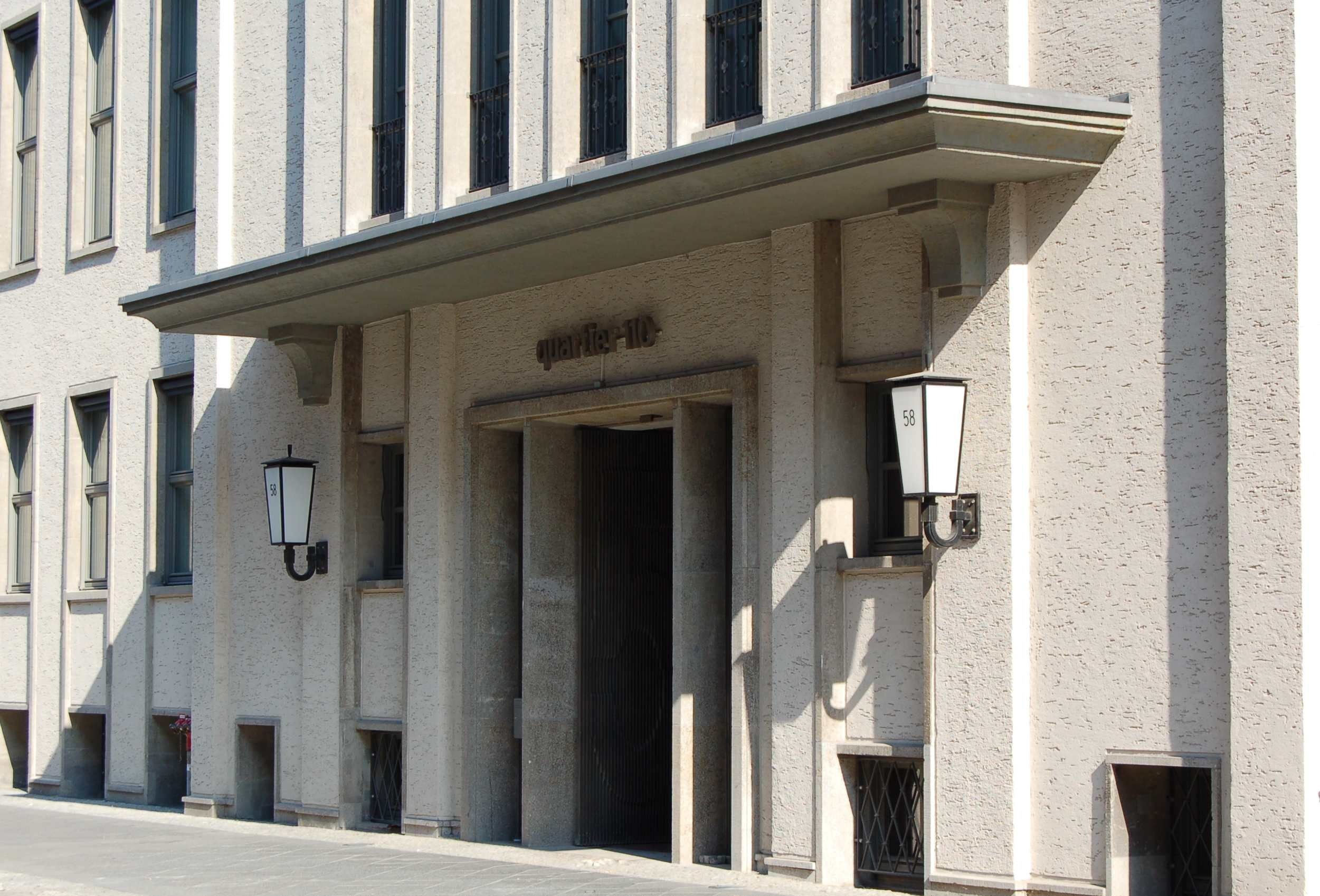
DIW (German Institute for Economic Research) Berlin building

- Leibniz Sozietät
- Deutsches Institut für Internationale Pädagogische Forschung (DIPF)
- German Institute for Economic Research - Deutsches Institut für Wirtschaftsforschung (DIW)
- Deutsches Rheumaforschungszentrum Berlin (DRFZ)
- Leibniz-Zentrum Allgemeine Sprachwissenschaft (ZAS)
- Leibniz-Zentrum für Literatur und Kulturforschung (ZfL)
- Leibniz-Zentrum Moderner Orient (ZMO)
- Museum für Naturkunde Berlin - Museum für Naturkunde - Leibniz-Institut für Evolutions- und Biodiversitätsforschung (MfN)
- WZB Berlin Social Science Center

Under Forschungsverbund Berlin e. V. (FVB) (Research Association of Berlin):

- Ferdinand-Braun-Institut, Leibniz-Institut für Höchstfrequenztechnik (FBH)
- Leibniz-Forschungsinstitut für Molekulare Pharmakologie (FMP)
- Leibniz-Institut für Gewässerökologie und Binnenfischerei (IGB)
- Leibniz Institute for Crystal Growth - Leibniz-Institut für Kristallzüchtung (IKZ)
- Leibniz-Institut für Zoo- und Wildtierforschung (IZW)
- Max-Born-Institut für Nichtlineare Optik und Kurzzeitspektroskopie (MBI)
- Paul Drude Institute - Paul-Drude-Institut für Festkörperelektronik (PDI)
- Weierstrass Institute - Weierstraß-Institut für Angewandte Analysis und Stochastik (WIAS)

=== Helmholtz centers ===
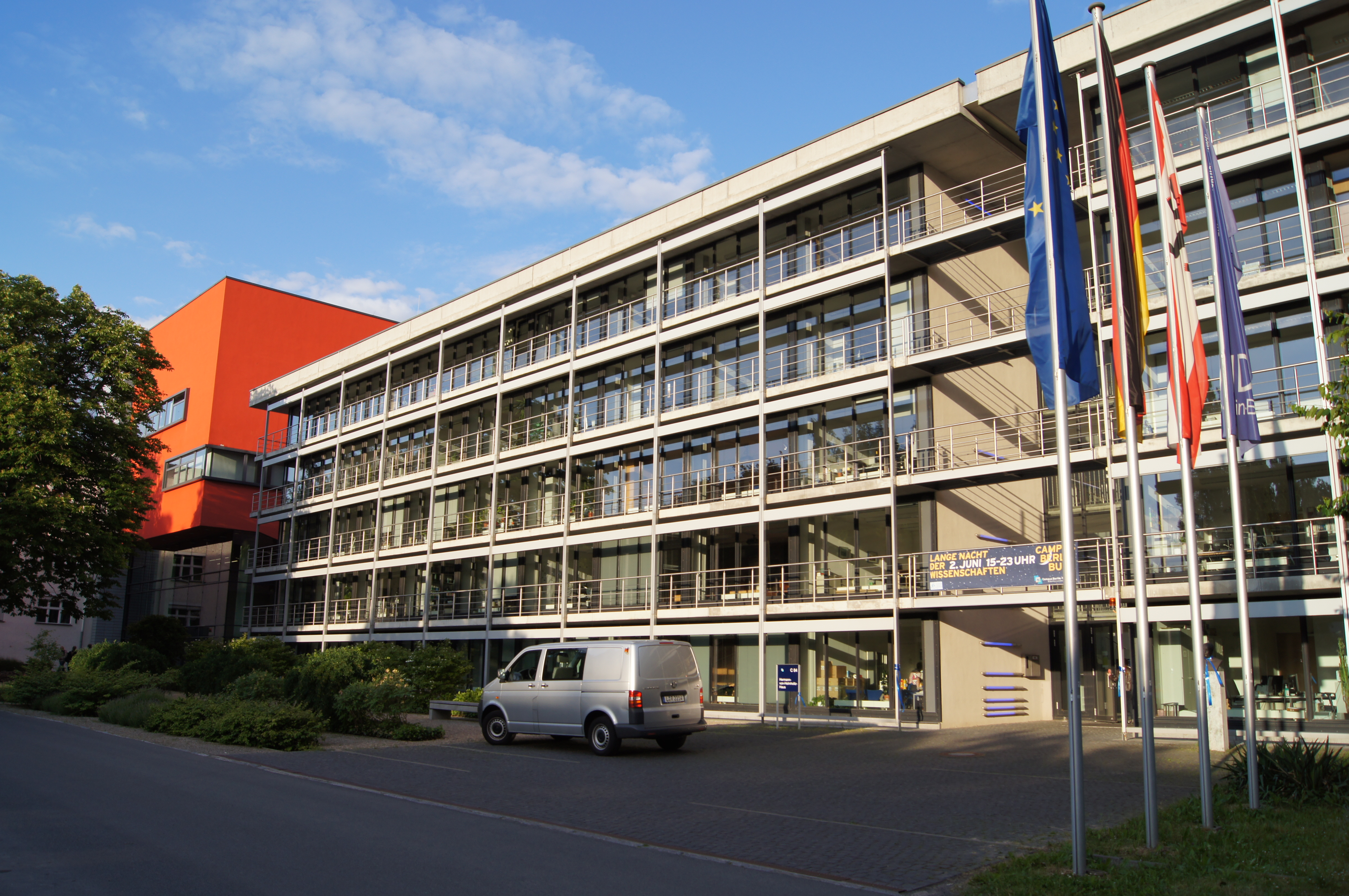
Max Delbrück Center for Molecular Medicine

- Max Delbrück Center for Molecular Medicine
- Helmholtz-Zentrum Berlin (BESSY)
- Institut für Planetenforschung of the Deutsches Zentrum für Luft- und Raumfahrt

=== Max-Planck Institutes ===
- Fritz Haber Institute of the MPG (FHI)
- Max Planck Institute for Human Development
- Max Planck Institute for Infection Biology
- Max Planck Institute for Molecular Genetics (MOLGEN)
- Max Planck Institute for the History of Science
- Archiv zur Geschichte der Max-Planck-Gesellschaft

=== Fraunhofer Institutes ===
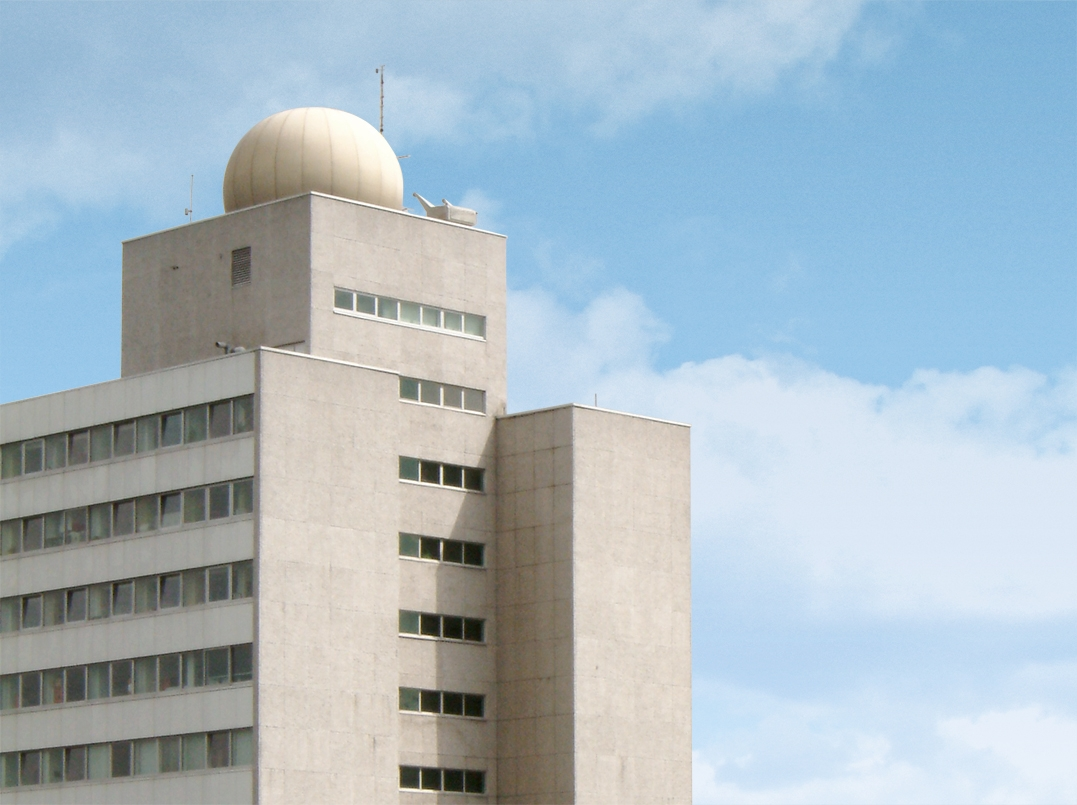
Fraunhofer HHI

- Fraunhofer-Institut für Nachrichtentechnik
  - Heinrich-Hertz-Institut (HHI)
  - Sino-German Mobile Communications Institute
- Fraunhofer-Institut für offene Kommunikationssysteme (FOKUS)
- Fraunhofer-Institut für Produktionsanlagen und Konstruktionstechnik (IPK)
- Fraunhofer-Institut für Rechnerarchitektur und Softwaretechnik (integrated into FOKUS in 2012)
- Fraunhofer-Institut für Software- und Systemtechnik (integrated into FOKUS in 2012)
- Fraunhofer-Institut für Zuverlässigkeit und Mikrointegration (IZM)

== Nobel Prize winners ==
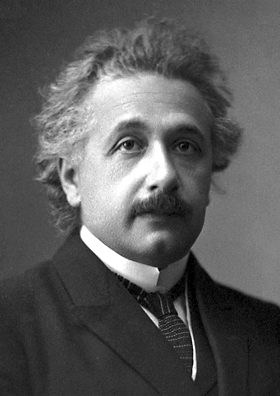
Albert Einstein

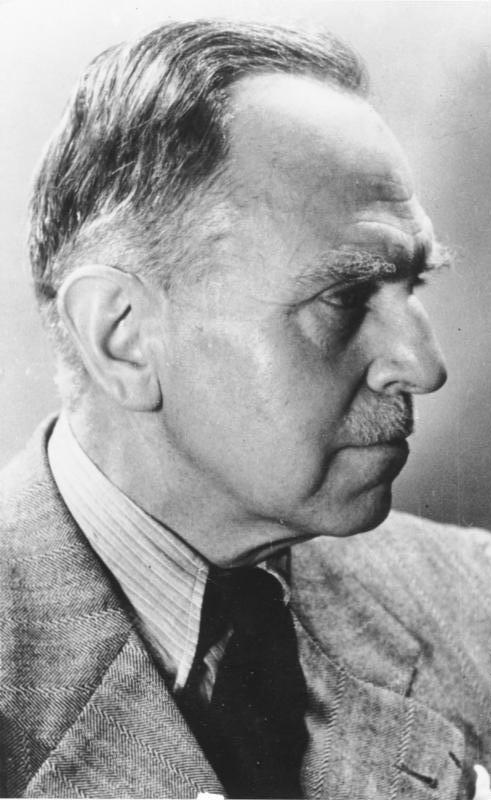
Otto Hahn

There are 43 Nobel laureates affiliated with the Berlin-based universities:

| 1901 Jacobus Henricus van 't Hoff (Chemistry); 1901 Emil Adolf von Behring (Physiology or Medicine); 1902 Hermann Emil Fischer (Chemistry); 1902 Theodor Mommsen (Literature); 1905 Adolf von Baeyer (Chemistry); 1905 Robert Koch (Physiology or Medicine); 1907 Albert Abraham Michelson (Physics); 1907 Eduard Buchner (Chemistry); 1908 Paul Ehrlich (Physiology or Medicine); 1909 Karl Ferdinand Braun (Physics); 1910 Otto Wallach (Chemistry); 1910 Albrecht Kossel (Physiology or Medicine); 1910 Paul Heyse (Literature); 1911 Wilhelm Wien (Physics); 1914 Max von Laue (Physics); 1915 Richard Willstätter (Chemistry); 1918 Fritz Haber (Chemistry); 1918 Max Planck (Physics); 1920 Walther Nernst (Chemistry); 1921 Albert Einstein (Physics); 1925 Gustav Ludwig Hertz (Physics); 1925 James Franck (Physics) | 1925 Richard Adolf Zsigmondy (Chemistry); 1928 Adolf Otto Reinhold Windaus (Chemistry); 1929 Hans von Euler-Chelpin (Chemistry); 1931 Otto Heinrich Warburg (Physiology or Medicine); 1932 Werner Heisenberg (Physics); 1933 Erwin Schrödinger (Physics); 1935 Hans Spemann (Physiology or Medicine); 1936 Peter Debye (Chemistry); 1939 Adolf Butenandt (Chemistry); 1944 Otto Hahn (Chemistry); 1950 Kurt Alder (Chemistry); 1950 Otto Diels (Chemistry); 1953 Fritz Albert Lipmann (Physiology or Medicine); 1953 Hans Adolf Krebs (Physiology or Medicine); 1954 Max Born (Physics); 1956 Walther Bothe (Physics); 1986 Ernst Ruska (Physics); 1991 Bert Sakmann (Physiology or Medicine); 1994 Reinhard Selten (Economics); 2007 Gerhard Ertl (Chemistry); 2009 Herta Müller (Literature) |

== See also ==
- Science and technology in Germany
- Education in Germany
- List of universities in Germany
