= Institut für Kristallzüchtung =

Research institution in Germany

Coordinates: 52°25′54″N 13°31′37″E

Leibniz Institute for Crystal Growth
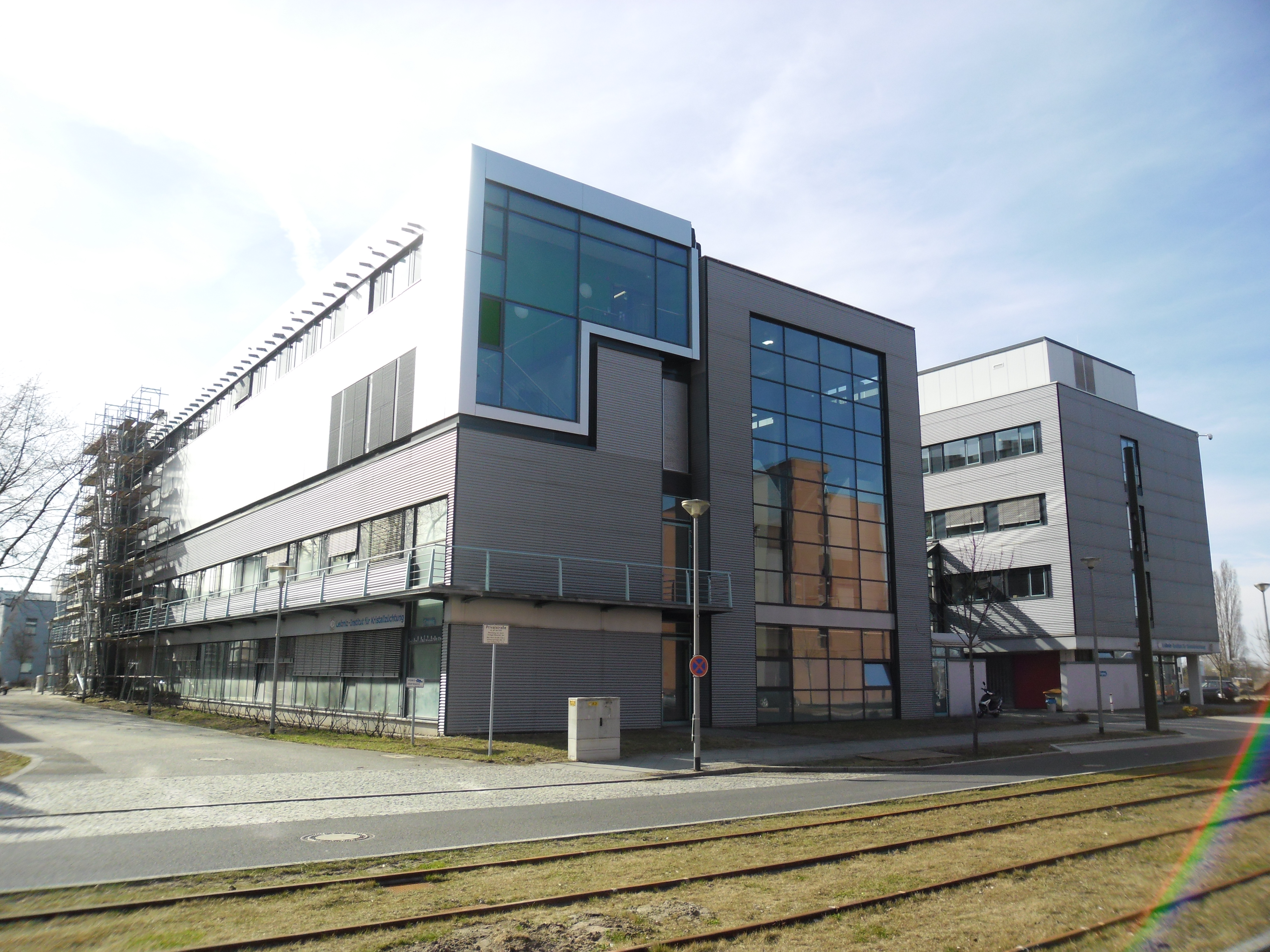
- The Leibniz Institute for Crystal Growth in 2011
- Established: 1 January 1992
- Chair: Thomas Schröder
- Staff: approx. 120
- Budget: approx. 8 million Euro
- Address: Max-Born-Str. 2, 12489 Berlin, Germany
- Location: Berlin-Adlershof
- Website: www.ikz-berlin.de

The Leibniz-Institut für Kristallzüchtung (IKZ), German for Leibniz Institute for Crystal Growth, is a research institute within the Gottfried Wilhelm Leibniz Scientific Community (WGL) and is a member of the Forschungsverbund Berlin (Berlin Research Cooperation). The institute is based in Berlin, Germany at the WISTA Science and Technology Park in the sub-district of Berlin-Adlershof. Its research activities concentrate on basic research on the fields of natural science and materials science.

== History ==
The institute evolved from the former Technical Centre for Crystal Growth ("Technikum Kristallzüchtung"), a part of the Centre for Scientific Apparatus Engineering ("Zentrum für wissenschaftlichen Gerätebau") within the Academy of Sciences of the German Democratic Republic. Due to a recommendation of the German Council of Science and Humanities, the institute was reestablished on 1 January 1992 as a scientific service institute under the name "Institut für Kristallzüchtung". On 4 June 2008 it was renamed to "Leibniz-Institut für Kristallzüchtung".

After director Roberto Fornari unexpectedly left the institute in 2013, the IKZ was led from 2013 to 2017 by interim director Günther Tränkle, who is also the director of the neighbouring Ferdinand Braun Institute.

Since 2018 the IKZ is led by director Thomas Schröder, previously a department manager at the IHP in Frankfurt (Oder).

== Tasks ==
The institute focuses on the development and production of crystalline materials. Typical areas of application for those crystals are microelectronics, optoelectronics and power electronics as well as photovoltaics, optics, lasers and sensor technology. The entire range from basic research up to readiness for production is hereby covered.

The research profile contains:

- Experimental and theoretical contributions to the scientific and technical fundamentals for the growth, processing and characterization of crystalline solids
- Growth, processing and characterization of crystals for internal purposes, project partners and customers in other research institutes and in the industry
- Development of technologies for the fabrication and processing of crystals
- Development of procedures and equipment for the characterization of crystals
- Development and construction of components for the growth and processing of crystals

The processes used for crystal growth cover both bulk crystal growth and thin-film deposition.

The service functions are: development and supply of crystals, equipment and processes for national and international cooperation partners and clients as well as measurement and analysis tasks. The institute is a Center of Excellence for all significant natural scientific and technical questions dealing with crystal growth.

== Cooperations ==
The IKZ cooperates with multiple national and international universities, non-university research institutes and with industrial partners. Beside the membership in the Gottfried Wilhelm Leibniz Scientific Community (WGL), the institute is also a member of the German Association for Crystal Growth (DGKK).

A close cooperation exists with the Physics Department of the Humboldt University of Berlin at the Adlershof campus, which benefits from the physical proximity.

== Infrastructure ==
The institute is divided into three departments: Classical Semiconductors, Dielectric and Wide Bandgap Materials, and Layers and Nanostructures. Beyond that, there is the so-called scientific service, including Numerical Modelling, Characterization, Equipment Maintenance and Development.

About 120 people work at IKZ. The personnel is roughly made up of half scientists and half technical staff.

The total budget of the institute amounts to approximately 8 million Euro. Within the framework of the basic financing, about 6.2 million of which are being paid by the federal government and the federal states in equal shares.

== Spin-Off ==
The IKZ actively promotes spin-offs to translate its research into commercial applications. One such spin-off is NextGO Epi, founded in 2025 by Dr. Ta-Shun Chou, Dr. Andreas Popp, and Dr. Andreas Fiedler. The company produces high-quality β-Ga₂O₃ epiwafers for high-power electronics and photodetection applications, aiming to become a leading supplier of gallium oxide epiwafers and support the development of next-generation energy-efficient semiconductor devices.

== See also ==
- List of universities, colleges, and research institutions in Berlin
- Crystallography
- Crystal growth
