= Paul Drude Institute =

Research institution in Germany

Paul Drude Institute for Solid State Electronics
- Other name: PDI
- Parent institution: Leibniz Association
- Established: 1 January 1992
- Chair: Roman Engel-Herbert
- Staff: approx. 110
- Budget: approx. 12 million Euro
- Owner: Forschungsverbund Berlin e.V.
- Address: Hausvogteiplatz 5-7, 10117 Berlin, Germany
- Location: Berlin-Mitte
- Coordinates: 52°30′47″N 13°23′44″E
- Interactive map of Paul Drude Institute for Solid State Electronics
- Website: www.pdi-berlin.de

The Paul-Drude-Institut für Festkörperelektronik German for Paul Drude Institute for Solid State Electronics (PDI) is a research institution under the auspices of the Forschungsverbund Berlin and is a member of the Leibniz Association. The institute is located at Hausvogteiplatz in Berlin-Mitte, its research activities are in basic research in the fields of physics and engineering and the areas of materials science and electronics/optoelectronics.

== History ==
The institute emerged from the Central Institute for Electron Physics of the Academy of Sciences of the GDR. Based on a recommendation of the Wissenschaftsrat, the institute was newly founded on January 1, 1992, and headed by Klaus Ploog until 2006, followed by Henning Riechert until the end of 2019.

The institute is named after the German physicist Paul Drude (1863–1906), who conducted research in the fields of optics and electronics, among others, and gave his name to the Drude theory.

== Tasks ==
The PDI conducts basic research on nanostructured semiconductors and is involved in the development and realization of novel concepts for future components in information technology and communication technology.

Research focuses on III-V semiconductors based on aluminum, gallium and indium as well as nitrogen and arsenic on the one hand, as well as semiconducting oxides (e.g. Ga_{2}O_{3}), 2D Materials and hybrid ferromagnet semiconductor structures, on the other hand. Among other things, the crystal growth processes are investigated using molecular beam epitaxy. Furthermore, fundamental optical, electrical and structural properties of the semiconductor layers and structures produced in this way are the subject of research. Where possible, paths to possible applications are also identified.

This involves the generation, amplification, transmission and manipulation of light as well as the development of new concepts for the coding, transmission and processing of information based on quantum states of individual photons or electrons (spintronics). Current topics also include the growth and characterization of nanowires, surface acoustic waves for the control of elementary excitations (photons, electrons, spins), phase-change materials and quantum cascade lasers.

Research is divided into three departments: Epitaxy (primarily Molecular Beam Epitaxy, MBE), Semiconductor Spectroscopy and Microstructure Analysis. However, key topics are dealt with across departments.

== Cooperations ==
The PDI cooperates closely with university and non-university institutions and is involved in many third-party funded projects.

At the university level, there is close cooperation with the Institute of Physics, Department of Experimental Physics and Materials Science of the Faculty of Mathematics and Natural Sciences I of the Humboldt-Universität zu Berlin.

Three application laboratories for electron tomography in transmission electron microscopy, for time-resolved cathodoluminescence spectroscopy in scanning electron microscopy, and for thermal laser epitaxy are located at the PDI, making these characterization and growth techniques accessible to external users.

== Infrastructure ==
Since July 2021, the current director is Roman Engel-Herbert, who also holds an S professorship at the Department of Physics at Humboldt-Universität zu Berlin. The institute has around 100 staff members.

The institute's total budget in 2023 was 11.6 million euros, of which around 10.3 million euros were provided by the federal government and the federal states in equal parts as part of the basic funding.

Among other things, the institute operates around a dozen molecular beam epitaxy facilities, various optical measuring stations (photoluminescence, cathodoluminescence, FTIR, UV Raman spectroscopy...), several transmission electron microscopes, scanning electron microscopes and scanning probe microscopes, as well as an integrated growth and measurement setup at the Berlin synchrotron (electron accelerator and storage ring) BESSY. It has its own clean room.

== See also ==
- Universities and research institutions in Berlin
- Leibniz Association
