= Ferdinand-Braun-Institut =

Research institution in Germany

Coordinates: 52°25′43″N 13°32′02″E

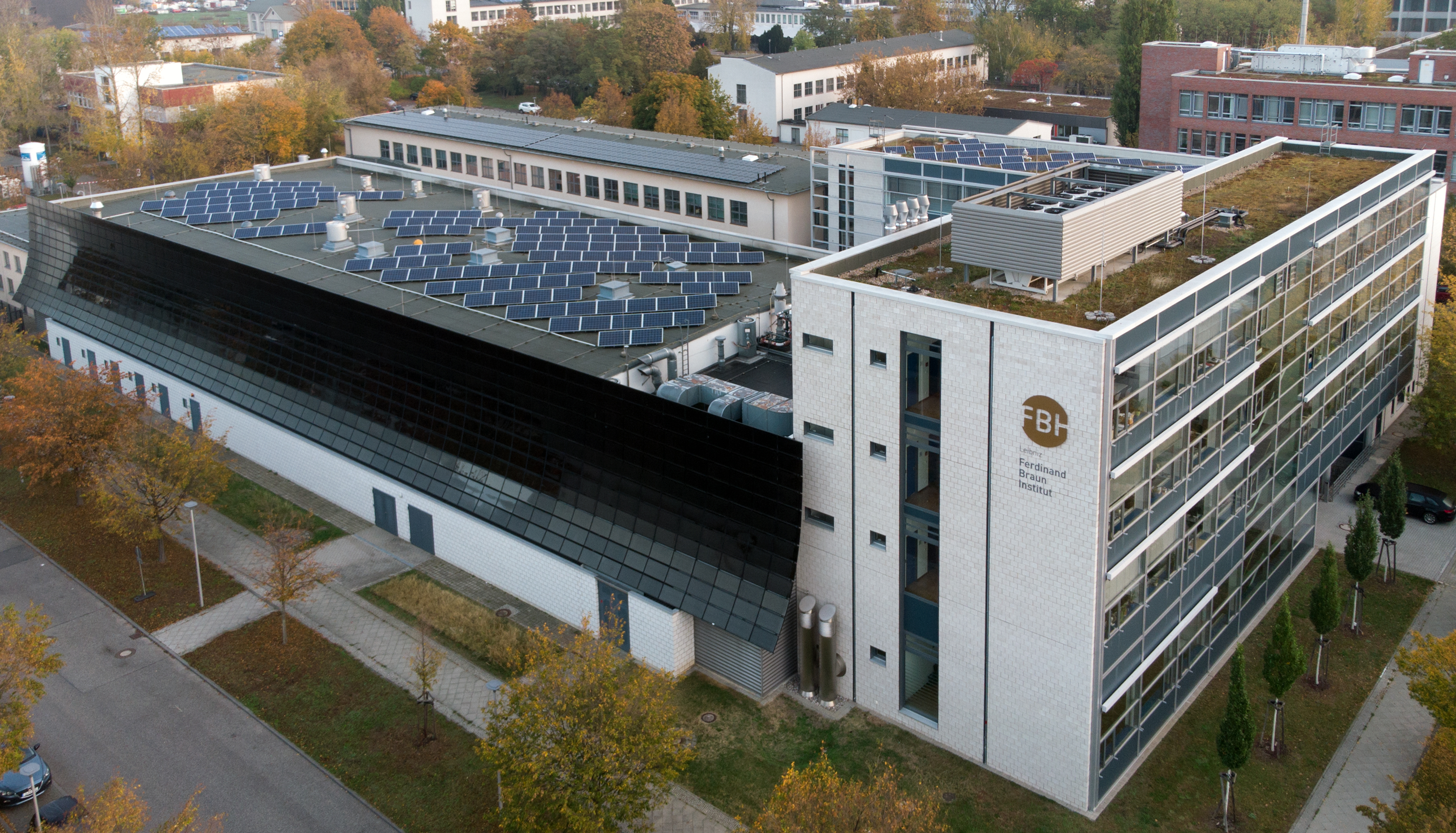
Ferdinand-Braun-Institut, Leibniz-Institut für Höchstfrequenztechnik

The Ferdinand-Braun-Institut, Leibniz-Institut für Höchstfrequenztechnik (FBH) is a research institute, which is a member of the Gottfried Wilhelm Leibniz Scientific Community. The institute is located in Berlin at the Wissenschafts- und Wirtschaftsstandort Adlershof (WISTA), its research activity is applied science in the fields of III-V electronics, photonics, integrated quantum technology and III-V technology.

== History ==
The institute arose from the former „Zentralinstitut für Optik und Spektroskopie“ and parts of "Zentralinstitut für Elektronenphysik" der Akademie der Wissenschaften der DDR. Based on a recommendation of the Wissenschaftsrat, it was reestablished on January 1, 1992.

The institute is named after Ferdinand Braun (1850–1918), who received the Nobel Prize for physics in 1909 for his contributions on the development of wireless telegraphy.

== Research ==
The Ferdinand-Braun-Institute conducts research based on III-V semiconductor technology. Applications include information- and communications technology, sensors as well as laser technology. Emphasis is given in III-V electronics to the design and fabrication of transistors and integrated microwave circuits, atmospheric plasma sources, terahertz electronics and GaN power electronics. In photonics, the focus is on high-power laser diodes, high brilliance lasers and hybrid-integrated laser systems as well as components for quantum technology. FBH also develops UV laser diodes and UV LEDs.

The FBH is organized in the following research areas:

- III-V Electronics
  - GaN microwave transistors & MMICs
  - advanced power amplifier concepts for the wireless infrastructure
  - integrated circuits with InP HBTs for the 100…500 GHz frequency range (THz electronics)
  - fast drivers for laser diodes
  - compact sources for microwave plasmas
  - GaN power electronics

- Photonics
  - high-power diode lasers: broad area & bars
  - high-brightness & narrowband diode lasers
  - hybrid laser modules (cw & pulsed): from NIR to UV spectral range, e.g. for biophotonics, laser sensors, laser metrology, quantum sensors…
  - nitride laser diodes for the blue & UV spectral range
  - short-wave UV LEDs, e.g. for sensors, disinfection, medical & production technology, …

- Integrated Quantum Technology
  - electro-optical components & hybrid micro-integrated modules
  - integrated quantum sensors based on ultra-cold atoms
  - nanostructured diamond systems & materials

- III-V Technology
  - epitaxy (MOVPE) of GaAs- & GaN-based layer structures for devices
  - (Al)GaN HVPE for bulk crystal growth
  - in-situ control techniques for MOVPE & HVPE
  - complete process line 2" - 4" for GaAs, InP, SiC & GaN devices, including laser micro processing
  - InP HBT technology for mm-wave & THz applications, hetero-integrated SiGe-BiCMOS/InP-HBT foundry with IHP
  - mounting & assembly

Services from the FBH comprise e.g. prototyping of electronical and optoelectronical GaAs and GaN based devices, epitaxy of GaAs-based layer systems, the development of GaAs processes, pilot series of integrated microwave circuits and laser diodes, consulting in rf measurement technology and the simulation of coplanar waveguide circuits.

The institute operates an industry-compatible clean room facility including MOVPE and HVPE on wafers from 2" to 4" and a process line for wafers from 2" to 4". It operates materials and process analytics, device measurement facilities and tools for simulation and CAD.

== Cooperations ==
The institute cooperates with national and international universities, research institutions and industrial companies. The FBH offers services from epitaxy and process steps up to complete devices and systems.

The Ferdinand-Braun-Institut is a member of the "Leibniz Association(Wissenschaftsgemeinschaft Gottfried Wilhelm Leibniz e.V., WGL)" and also member of OpTecBB, an initiative of research institutes and companies for the development and use of optical technologies.

In the academic field, there is a close cooperation with the TU Berlin, the Humboldt University of Berlin and other universities in Berlin and in Germany both in teaching and in joint research groups and projects.

Since 2017 the FBH is part of Forschungsfabrik Mikroelektronik Deutschland (FMD).

== Spin-offs ==
Spin-offs from research institutes are part of a strategy to transform scientific results into innovative and profitable products. At FBH, several successful spin offs have been initialized. Here some examples:

In 1999, employees of the FBH founded Three-Five Epitaxial Services AG (TESAG), a company to produce semiconductor layer systems which acts as basis for devices like laser diodes, LEDs, transistors (HBTs) or Schottky-Diodes. The company is now part of Jenoptik.

Founded in 2002 eagleyard Photonics develops in close cooperation with the FBH high-power laser diodes with wavelengths from 650 nm to 1120 nm which are used in medical, scientific and industrial applications.

In 2006, BeMiTec was founded to develop, produce and sell high-power gallium nitride transistors (GaN) for future applications in mobile communications.

In 2013, three new spin-offs of FBH employees were launched: from the marketing of a plasma source (BEAPLAS) for the production of thin films at atmospheric pressure, to the further development of semiconductor technology for applications in sensor and display technology (Brilliance Fab Berlin), to measuring instruments for microwave technology (Phasor Instruments).

This was followed in 2016 by the spin-off of UVphotonics working with ultraviolet LED, 2017 BeamXpert: the company offers simulation software for optical systems. In 2025, Rydberg Photonics GmbH was founded, a spin-off specializing in micro-integrated photonics and quantum technology.

== Management, infrastructure, financing ==
FBH is managed by Prof. Dr.-Ing. Patrick Scheele as Scientific Managing Director (since 2024) - he follows the longterm Director Prof. Dr. Günther Tränkle (1996-2023) - and Dr. Karin-Irene Eiermann as Administrative Managing Director (since 2022). Moreover, Patrick Scheele is a professor at the Technische Universität Berlin and holding the chair for microwave and optoelectronics. The institute has about 400 employees, including 200 scientists and 30 students (2025). The total turnover in 2025 was 44,4 million Euro, including 24,8 million Euro funding.
