= Leibniz Institute for the German Language =

Institute in Germany

Coordinates: 49.4882°N 8.4720°E

- Abbreviation: IDS
- Formation: 1964
- Purpose: Educational accreditation
- Location: Mannheim, Baden-Wuerttemberg, Germany
- Region served: Europe, Germany
- Members: Leibniz Association
- Director: Henning Lobin
- Staff: 160
- Website: www.ids-mannheim.de

The Leibniz Institute for the German Language (IDS; German: Leibniz-Institut für Deutsche Sprache) in Mannheim, Germany, is a linguistic and social research institute and a member of the Leibniz Association. Under the leadership of Prof. Dr. Henning Lobin, director of the institute, and Prof. Dr. Arnulf Deppermann, vice director of the institute, IDS employs a staff of about 160. The IDS was established in Mannheim in 1964 and is still headquartered there. It is the central extramural institute for research and documentation of the German language in its contemporary usage and its recent history. As a member of the Leibniz-Gemeinschaft (Leibniz-Association), the IDS is financed both by the federal government and by the state of Baden-Wuerttemberg.

== Organization and structure ==
The work of the IDS is divided into four departments and two central sections:

- Department of Grammar
- Department of Lexical Studies
- Department of Pragmatics
- Department of Digital Linguistics
- Department of Central Research
- Public Relations, Documentation, and Library Section

== Research ==
In the Department of Grammar, the grammatical structure of contemporary German is identified and described. The department is divided into two areas that work with contemporary theoretical and methodological standards of German linguistics and simultaneously employ computational-linguistic and statistical methods. Research is conducted in two areas, the area Description and Development of Grammatical Knowledge and the area Language Technologies and Information Systems. The Rat für Deutsche Rechtschreibung (Council for German Orthography) is also affiliated with this department.

The Department of Lexical Studies deals with lexicological, lexicographical, and corpus-based research in which specific lexical fields are studied, enabling comprehensive documentation of the German vocabulary. Research is conducted in the following three areas: Lexicography and Documentation of Language, Lexical Syntagmatics and Empirical and Digital Lexical Studies.

The Department of Pragmatics researches language use and language variation, that is, the form and development of linguistic diversity. In particular, spoken language usage is considered. The area Interaction is a leading international center for conversation research and interactional linguistics. The area Spoken Corpora includes archives, such as the "Archiv für Gesprochenes Deutsch (AGD)" (the Archive for spoken German).

The Department of Digital Linguistics is divided into two areas. The area Research Coordination and Research Infrastructure deals with tasks and projects related to the internal and external communication of information and networking. The area Corpus Linguistics supervises the expansion, annotation, and analysis of (written language) electronic corpora of German and develops methods and techniques of corpus-linguistic, empirical research.

The research activities pursuing predominantly cross-departmental objectives are directly subordinate to the director and pooled together in the organizational unit Central Research, for instance, the program areas Research Infrastructures and Corpus Linguistics belong to this unit. The area Language in the public sphere investigates issues that affect the status and function of the German language in society.

The Public Relations Section manages the areas of public relations and the media, publications, documentation, and the library. Within the framework of its support services, the IDS maintains the German Language Archive, which is the largest collection of audio recordings of spoken German. Prospective users can order audio documentation and transcripts. Besides, the IDS provides online the archive corpora of written language (nine million book pages) as well as a specialized library that collects literature that encompasses all areas of present-day German linguistics.

== See also ==
- University of Mannheim
