= Leibniz Association =

German association of research institutes

- Formation: 1995; 31 years ago
- Type: non-profit research organization
- Headquarters: Berlin, Germany
- President: Christoph M. Schmidt
- Main organ: Senate
- Budget: €2.3 billion (2025)
- Staff: 21,400
- Website: www.leibniz-association.eu

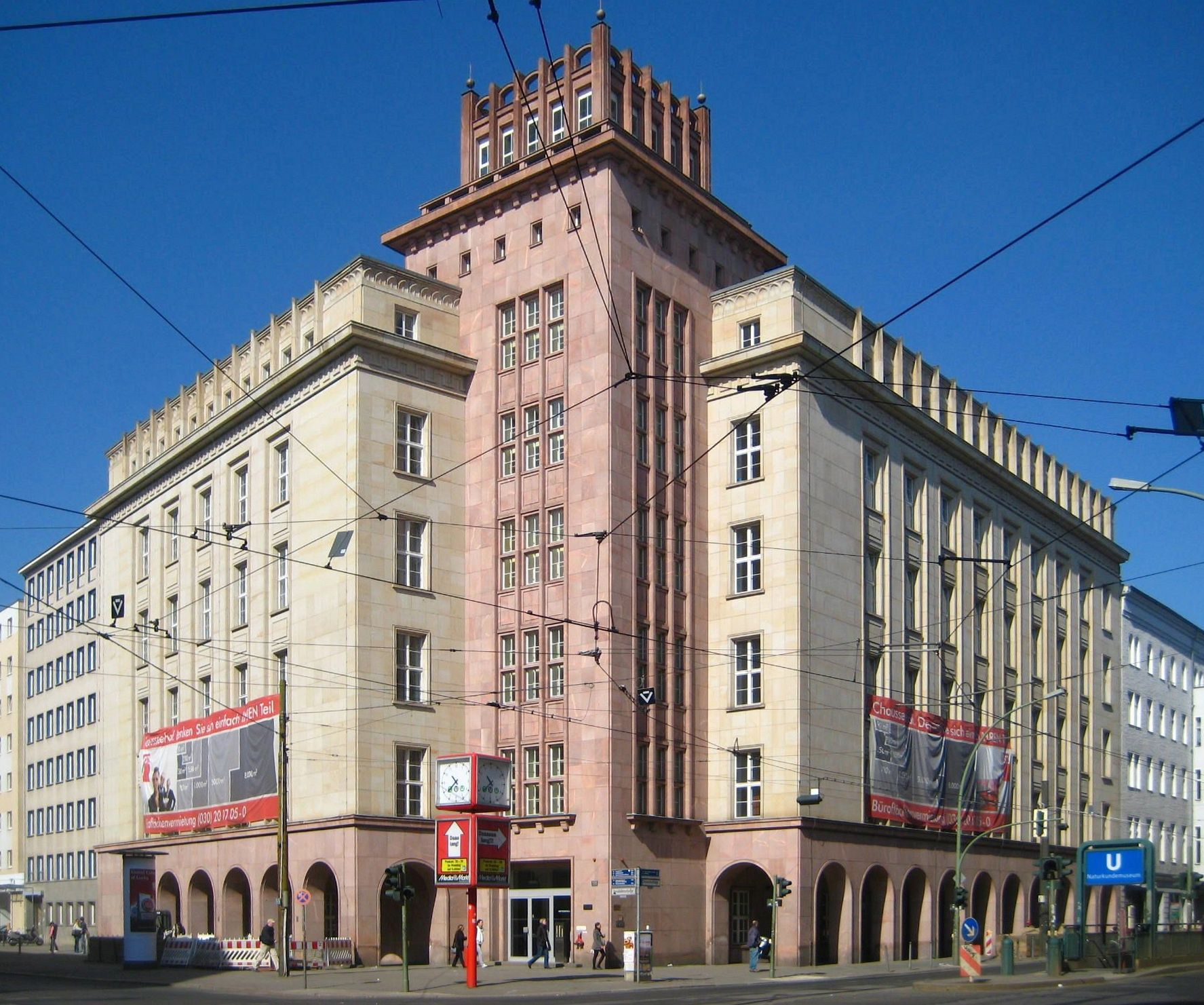
Chausseehof building, Chausseestrasse 111 in Berlin, seat of the Leibniz Association since 2011

The Leibniz Association (German: Leibniz-Gemeinschaft or Wissenschaftsgemeinschaft Gottfried Wilhelm Leibniz) is a union of German non-university research institutes from various disciplines.

== Funding and structure ==
As of 2026, 96 non-university research institutes and service institutions for science are part of the Leibniz Association. The fields range from natural, life, engineering and environmental sciences to economics, spatial and social sciences and the humanities. The Leibniz Institutes work in an interdisciplinary fashion, and connect basic and applied science. They cooperate with universities, industry, and other partners in different parts of the world. Taken together, the Leibniz Institutes employ 21,400 people and have a budget of €2.3 billion. Leibniz Institutes are funded publicly to equal parts by the federal government and the Federal states (Bundesländer).

Every Leibniz institution is evaluated by the Leibniz Senate regularly, at a minimum of once every seven years. The evaluation is used as a benchmark of quality with respect to the work and research carried out by the institutes.

== History ==
The Leibniz Association is named after the German philosopher, mathematician, scientist and inventor Gottfried Wilhelm Leibniz (1646–1716). The organization evolved from the "Blaue Liste" (blue list) in former Western Germany and research institutions of the German Academy of Sciences at Berlin of the former German Democratic Republic (GDR), whose research capability was deemed worth keeping after an evaluation by the German Wissenschaftsrat. The name "Blaue Liste" for a German model for funding science has been retired, and traces back to the color of a dossier.

The Leibniz Association's headquarter is located in Berlin and there is an EU bureau in Brussels. Since 2026, the economist Christoph M. Schmidt acts as president of the Leibniz Association.

== Sections ==
=== A - Humanities and Educational Research ===
| Name | Location | Initials | Website |
| Deutsches Bergbau-Museum Bochum – Leibniz Research Museum for Geo-resources | Bochum | DBM | www.bergbaumuseum.de |
| Leibniz Institute for Jewish History and Culture – Simon Dubnow | Leipzig | DI | www.dubnow.de/en/ |
| German Institute for Adult Education – Leibniz Centre for Lifelong Learning | Bonn | DIE | www.die-bonn.de |
| DIPF | Leibniz Institute for Research and Information in Education | Frankfurt am Main and Berlin | DIPF | www.dipf.de/ |
| Deutsches Museum of Masterpieces of Science and Technology | München | DM | www.deutsches-museum.de |
| German Maritime Museum – Leibniz Institute for Maritime History | Bremerhaven | DSM | www.dsm.museum |
| Leibniz Institute for Educational Media | Georg Eckert Institute | Braunschweig | GEI | www.gei.de |
| Germanisches Nationalmuseum | Nürnberg | GNM | www.gnm.de |
| Herder Institute for Historical Research on East Central Europe - Institute of the Leibniz Association | Marburg | HI | www.herder-institut.de |
| Leibniz Institute for the German Language | Mannheim | IDS | www.ids-mannheim.de |
| Leibniz Institute for Contemporary History | München-Berlin | IfZ | www.ifz-muenchen.de |
| Leibniz Institute for Educational Trajectories | Bamberg | LIfBi | www.lifbi.de |
| Leibniz Institute for Science and Mathematics Education | Kiel | IPN | www.leibniz-ipn.de/en |
| Leibniz Institute of European History | Mainz | IEG | www.ieg-mainz.de |
| Leibniz Institute for the History and Culture of Eastern Europe | Leipzig | GWZO | http://www.leibniz-gwzo.de |
| Leibniz-Institute for East and Southeast European Studies | Regensburg | IOS | www.ios-regensburg.de |
| Leibniz-Institut für Wissensmedien | Tübingen | IWM | www.iwm-tuebingen.de |
| Leibniz-Zentrum für Archäologie | Mainz | LEIZA | www.rgzm.de |
| Leibniz-Centre General Linguistics | Berlin | ZAS | www.leibniz-zas.de/en/ |
| Leibniz Center for Literary and Cultural Research | Berlin | ZfL | www.zfl-berlin.org/zfl-english.html |
| Leibniz-Zentrum Moderner Orient | Berlin | ZMO | www.zmo.de |
| Leibniz Institute for Psychology | Trier | ZPID | www.zpid.de |
| Leibniz Centre for Contemporary History Potsdam | Potsdam | ZZF | www.zzf-pdm.de |

=== B - Economics, Social Sciences, Spatial Research ===
| Name | Location | Initials | Website |
| ARL – Academy for Spatial Development in the Leibniz Association | Hannover | ARL | www.arl-net.org |
| German Institute for Economic Research | Berlin | DIW | www.diw.de |
| GESIS – Leibniz Institute for the Social Sciences | Mannheim-Köln | GESIS | www.gesis.org |
| German Institute for Global and Area Studies (GIGA) / Leibniz-Institut für Globale und Regionale Studien | Hamburg | GIGA | www.giga-hamburg.de |
| Leibniz Institute of Agricultural Development in Transition Economies | Halle | IAMO | https://www.iamo.de/en/home |
| Leibniz Institute for Media Research / Hans-Bredow-Institut | Hamburg | HBI | www.leibniz-hbi.de |
| Leibniz Institute for Regional Geography | Leipzig | IfL | www.ifl-leipzig.com/ |
| Ifo Institute - Leibniz Institute for Economic Research at the University of Munich | München | ifo | www.ifo.de |
| Kiel Institute for the World Economy | Kiel | IfW | www.ifw-kiel.de |
| Leibniz Institute of Ecological Urban and Regional Development | Dresden | IÖR | www.ioer.de |
| Leibniz Institute for Research on Society and Space | Erkner | IRS | www.irs-net.de |
| Halle Institute for Economic Research - Member of the Leibniz Association | Halle/Saale | IWH | www.iwh-halle.de/en |
| Peace Research Institute Frankfurt | Frankfurt am Main | PRIF | www.hsfk.de |
| RWI - Leibniz Institute for Economic Research | Essen | RWI | www.rwi-essen.de/en/ |
| Leibniz Institute for Financial Research SAFE | Frankfurt/Main | SAFE | safe-frankfurt.de |
| WZB Berlin Social Science Center | Berlin | WZB | www.wzb.eu |
| ZBW – Leibniz Information Centre for Economics | Kiel & Hamburg | ZBW | www.zbw-kiel.de |
| ZEW – Leibniz Centre for European Economic Research | Mannheim | ZEW | www.zew.de |

=== C - Life Sciences ===
| Name | Location | Initials | Website |
| Bernhard Nocht Institute for Tropical Medicine | Hamburg | BNITM | www.bni-hamburg.de |
| Leibniz Institute for Prevention Research and Epidemiology – BIPS | Bremen | BIPS | www.bips.uni-bremen.de |
| German Diabetes Center - Leibniz Center for Diabetes Research at Heinrich Heine University Düsseldorf | Düsseldorf | DDZ | www.ddz.uni-duesseldorf.de |
| German Institute of Human Nutrition | Potsdam-Rehbrücke | DIfE | www.dife.de |
| German Rheumatism Research Center | Berlin | DRFZ | www.drfz.de |
| German Primate Center – Leibniz Institute for Primate Research | Göttingen | DPZ | www.dpz.eu |
| Leibniz-Institute DSMZ – German Collection of Microorganisms and Cell Cultures | Braunschweig | DSMZ | www.dsmz.de |
| Leibniz Institute on Aging - Fritz Lipmann Institute | Jena | FLI | www.leibniz-fli.de |
| Leibniz-Institut für Molekulare Pharmakologie | Berlin | FMP | www.fmp-berlin.de |
| Research Center Borstel - Leibniz Lung Center | Borstel | FZB | www.fz-borstel.de |
| Leibniz Institute for Natural Product Research and Infection Biology – Hans Knöll Institute | Jena | HKI | www.hki-jena.de |
| Leibniz-Institute of Virology | Hamburg | LIV | www.leibniz-liv.de/en |
| Leibniz Research Centre for Working Environment and Human Factors | Dortmund | IfADo | www.ifado.de |
| Leibniz Institute of Plant Biochemistry | Halle | IPB | www.ipb-halle.de/en/ |
| Leibniz Institute of Plant Genetics and Crop Plant Research | Gatersleben | IPK | www.ipk-gatersleben.de |
| IUF – Leibniz Research Institute for Environmental Medicine | Düsseldorf | IUF | www.iuf.uni-duesseldorf.de |
| Leibniz Institute for Zoo and Wildlife Research | Berlin | IZW | www.izw-berlin.de/ |
| Leibniz Institute for the Analysis of Biodiversity Change | Bonn & Hamburg | LIB | www.leibniz-lib.de |
| Leibniz Institute for Neurobiology | Magdeburg | LIN | www.ifn-magdeburg.de |
| Leibniz Institute for Resilience Research | Mainz | LIR | lir-mainz.de |
| Leibniz Institute for Immunotherapy | Regensburg | LIT | https://lit.eu/ |
| Leibniz Institute for Food Systems Biology at the Technical University of Munich | Freising | LSB | www.leibniz-lsb.de/en/ |
| Museum für Naturkunde - Leibniz Institute for Evolution and Biodiversity Science | Berlin | MfN | www.mfn-berlin.de |
| Senckenberg Gesellschaft für Naturforschung (Leibniz Institution for Biodiversity and Earth System Research) | Frankfurt am Main | SGN | https://www.senckenberg.de |

=== D - Mathematics, Natural Sciences, Engineering ===
| Name | Location | Initials | Website |
| Leibniz Institute for Astrophysics Potsdam | Potsdam | AIP | www.aip.de |
| Ferdinand-Braun-Institut - Leibniz-Institut für Hoechstfrequenztechnik | Berlin | FBH | www.fbh-berlin.com |
| DWI – Leibniz Institute for Interactive Materials | Aachen | DWI | www.dwi.rwth-aachen.de |
| FIZ Karlsruhe – Leibniz Institute for Information Infrastructure | Karlsruhe | FIZ KA | www.fiz-karlsruhe.de |
| Leibniz Institute of Atmospheric Physics at the University of Rostock | Kühlungsborn | IAP | www.iap-kborn.de |
| Leibniz Institute for Solid State and Materials Research Dresden | Dresden | IFW | www.ifw-dresden.de/ |
| Leibniz Institute for High Performance Microelectronics | Frankfurt (Oder) | IHP | www.ihp-microelectronics.com |
| Leibniz Institute of Photonic Technology | Jena | IPHT | www.ipht-jena.de |
| Leibniz-Institut für Kristallzüchtung (Leibniz Institute for Crystal Growth) | Berlin | IKZ | www.ikz-berlin.de |
| INM – Leibniz Institute for New Materials | Saarbrücken | INM | www.leibniz-inm.de/en/ |
| Leibniz Institute for Plasma Science and Technology | Greifswald | INP | www.inp-greifswald.de/en/ |
| Leibniz Institute of Surface Engineering | Leipzig | IOM | www.iom-leipzig.de |
| Leibniz Institute of Polymer Research Dresden | Dresden | IPF | www.ipfdd.de |
| Leibniz-Institut für Analytische Wissenschaften – ISAS | Dortmund | ISAS | www.isas.de |
| Leibniz-Institut für Verbundwerkstoffe (Leibniz-Institute for Composite Materials) | Kaiserslautern | IVW | www.ivw.uni-kl.de |
| Leibniz Institute for Materials Engineering — IWT | Bremen | IWT | www.iwt-bremen.de/en/home |
| Schloss Dagstuhl - Leibniz Center for Informatics | Wadern | LZI | www.dagstuhl.de |
| Leibniz Institute for Catalysis | Rostock | LIKAT | www.catalysis.de |
| Max-Born-Institute for Nonlinear Optics and Short Pulse Spectroscopy | Berlin | MBI | www.mbi-berlin.de |
| Mathematisches Forschungsinstitut Oberwolfach (Oberwolfach Research Institute for Mathematics ) | Oberwolfach | MFO | www.mfo.de |
| Paul Drude Institute for Solid State Electronics | Berlin | PDI | www.pdi-berlin.de |
| TIB – Leibniz Information Centre for Science and Technology | Hannover | TIB | www.tib.eu |
| Weierstrass Institute for Applied Analysis and Stochastics | Berlin | WIAS | www.wias-berlin.de |

=== E - Environmental Sciences ===
| Name | Location | Initials | Website |
| Leibniz Institute for Agricultural Engineering and Bioeconomy | Potsdam-Bornim | ATB | www.atb-potsdam.de |
| Leibniz Institute for Tropospheric Research | Leipzig | TROPOS | www.tropos.de |
| Leibniz Institute of Freshwater Ecology and Inland Fisheries | Berlin | IGB | www.igb-berlin.de |
| Leibniz Institute for Horticultural Sciences | Großbeeren | IGZ | www.igzev.de |
| Leibniz Institute for Baltic Sea Research | Warnemünde | IOW | www.io-warnemuende.de |
| Potsdam Institute for Climate Impact Research | Potsdam | PIK | www.pik-potsdam.de |
| Leibniz Centre for Agricultural Landscape Research | Müncheberg | ZALF | www.zalf.de |
| Leibniz Centre for Tropical Marine Research | Bremen | ZMT | www.leibniz-zmt.de/en/ |

== See also ==
- Not to be confused with the Gottfried-Wilhelm-Leibniz-Gesellschaft or the Leibniz Society of Sciences.
