= Leibniz-Zentrum Moderner Orient =

Research institute in Berlin, Germany

Coordinates: 52.42828°N 13.203413°E

Leibniz-Zentrum Moderner Orient (ZMO) is a German research institute located in Berlin, Germany. The researchers focus on a comparative and interdisciplinary study of the Middle East, Africa, Eurasia, South and Southeast Asia. Central to its current research topics is the study of predominantly Muslim societies and their relations with non-Muslim neighbours. ZMO was founded in 1996 as an independent centre for the humanities, cultural and social sciences and is situated in the “Mittelhof”, which was designed by Hermann Muthesius, in Berlin-Nikolassee. Under the directorate of de:Ulrike Freitag, the centre is part of the association “Geisteswissenschaftliche Zentren Berlin e.V.” (GWZ Berlin). The research programme has been funded by the Berlin Senate, the Deutsche Forschungsgemeinschaft (DFG) and the German Ministry for Education and Research. Since January 1, 2017 ZMO is part of the Leibniz Association.

The research programme of ZMO currently encompasses three interdisciplinary research units and approx. 35 scientific researchers that work on aspects of history and culture of the “modern Orient” from the 16th century onwards.

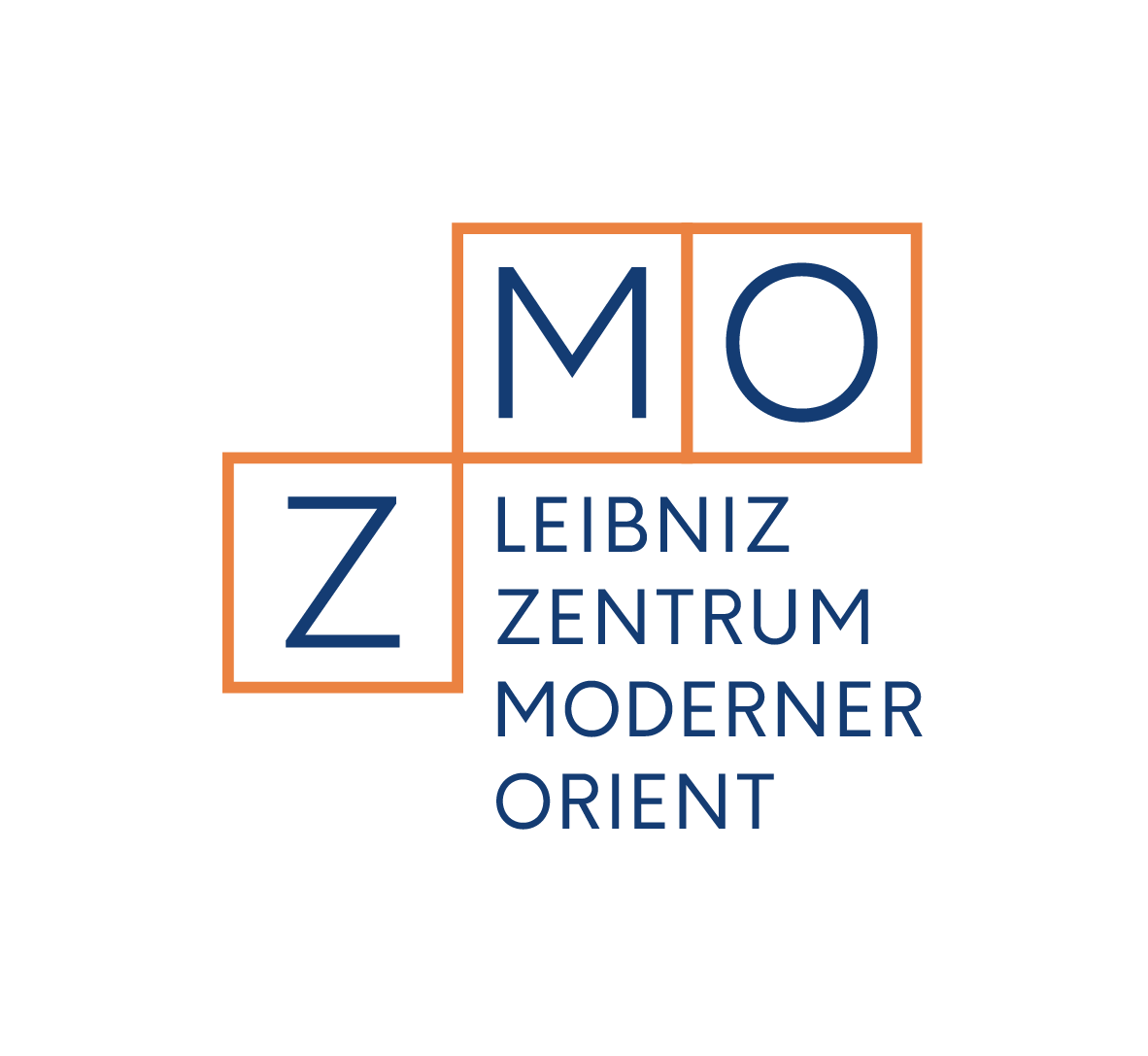
Leibniz-Zentrum Moderner Orient: Category / Research Institute; Sponsoring Association / Geisteswissenschaftliche Zentren Berlin e.V.; Location / Nikolassee, Berlin, Germany; Form of Research / Basic Research; Subjects / History, Anthropology, Islamic Studies; Fields of Research / Humanities, Social Sciences; Funding / Leibniz Gemeinschaft, third-party funds; Director / Ulrike Freitag; Employees / Approx. 55; Homepage / www.zmo.de

== Research Program ==
Research Programme (2025-2029)

ZMO's research programme, titled "Thinking through Translocal Entanglements: Perspectives from Asia, Africa, and the Middle East" (2020-2029), explores and analyses the ways in which social actors address and negotiate tensions and challenges related to diverse aspects of translocal connectivity in their experience, perception and practice. This is pursued with regard to the fact that their communities are themselves shaped (often characteristically) by specific histories of such connectivity and the tensions related to it. In terms of historical dimensions, the research is conceived against the backdrop of globalizing networks, largely from the perspective of Muslim agents and communities (and their respective counterparts) from the 16th to the 21st centuries. Further dimensions to be explored concern existential experiences and transformations of social practice; spatial (re-) configurations; conceptual frameworks, visions and revisions within such entanglements; economic relations; and formations and re-formations of the religious, the legal and the political.

From 2025 to 2029, the research programme focuses on the following three thematic areas: 1. State and Society, 2. Lives and Ecologies, 3. Religion and Intellectual Culture. All existing and planned projects are integrated into one of the three research areas, while the methodological and theoretical cross-sectional work takes place in cross-departmental workshops, theme days and other academic formats. This allows the empirical work on specific sources, archives, field observations and texts to be accompanied by conceptual considerations that enable researchers to participate in relevant theoretical debates. Particular attention is paid to conceptual structures and theories from the ZMO's research regions. In this way, research based at the ZMO can contribute to overcoming the Eurocentric dominance of the humanities and social sciences.

Engaging a variety of disciplines between history, anthropology, Islamic studies, political science and more, ZMO's research perspective is close to the studied translocal agents and their experience and interpretation through the profound regional knowledge and linguistic expertise of its researchers. Many of them are cultivating longer-term relationships in their regions of study, conducting research with relevant partners, or originating from the regions themselves.

Research Programme (2020-2024)

From 2020 to 2024, ZMO's research programme comprised four interdisciplinary research fields and around 35 academic staff working on aspects of the history and culture of the ‘Modern Orient’ since the 16th century.

The programme was developed with a view to the following four thematic priorities, which formed the framework for four corresponding research units: 1. ‘Age and Generation’, 2. ‘Environment and Justice’, 3. ‘Representations of the Past as a Mobilizing Force’ and 4. ‘Contested Religion and Intellectual Culture’. Hereby, the empirical work on specific materials, archives, fieldwork observations and texts is accompanied by conceptual reflections, contributing to relevant theoretical debates. In particular, attention to conceptual frameworks and theories from ZMO's regions of study plays an important role, as ZMO-based research also seeks to contribute to an overcoming of the dominance of Eurocentrism in the humanities and social sciences.

Research Programme (2008-2019)

In its main BMBF-funded research programme, the centre comprised four interdisciplinary project groups working on different historical and cultural aspects of the "Islamicate World" since the 18th century. Building on ZMO's preceding programmes, the first phase (2008-2013) of the current programme, "Muslim Worlds – World of Islam?", tracked the global condition of Muslim life worlds in a more differentiated manner.

From such a perspective, which understands itself as part of an on-going critique of Eurocentrism, the research programme studied Conceptions, Practices and Crises of the Global in Africa, Asia and the Middle East. Through empirically based and conceptually engaged projects, it explores specific themes within the wider field of tension between Muslim worlds, understood as the life worlds of Muslims or members of other communities in Islamicate contexts, and the World of Islam, constructed by a religious tradition with unifying claims but diverse interpretations and practices.

The research agenda included capturing the flows and dynamics of transregional interaction and connectivity that have characterized Muslim worlds in recent historical periods and under diverse conditions – while also including the ruptures, conflicts and crises that these processes entail. This allowed to trace the tensions between global concepts and lived practices, which may emphasize very different sets of norms, and to investigate, where necessary, concrete and diverse empirical settings in their relation to overarching normative demands upon Muslims in different political, social, and economic contexts.

The second phase (2014-2019) of ZMO’s research programme, "Muslim Worlds – World of Islam?", started from there. By way of four interlaced research units, themes and issues were explored that have emerged as relevant and particularly promising in the discussions of the previous research phase. The four fields investigated ‘Progress: Ideas, Agents, Symbols’, ‘The Politics of Resources’, ‘Trajectories of Lives and Knowledge’, and ‘Cities as Laboratories of Change’.

Research Programme 2000-2007

Under the overarching topic of “Translocality”, various projects researched in this time frame. Results of this research shed light into the network character of globalisation and its underlying limiting and excluding processes. The term “translocality” was utilised by ZMO in order to precisely explain the developments that it implies, in contrast to the term “globalisation” that is prone to theological and Eurocentric understanding.

Research Program (1996-2000)

Under the topic “Delimitation and Appropriation During Globalisation: Asia, Africa and Europe since the 18th Century" (“Abgrenzung und Aneignung in der Globalisierung: Asien, Afrika und Europa seit dem 18. Jahrhundert”), perceptions, processes and consequences of global processes and discourses were analysed in a historical and comparative manner. Three research groups, ‘Islam and Globalisation’, ‘Actors of Change’, and ‘Locality and the State’, were put in place to organise the overarching programme.

== Networking and Cooperations ==
The director of ZMO, Ulrike Freitag, is at the same time a professor of Islamic Studies at Freie Universität Berlin (FU). Vice Director, Kai Kresse, simultaneously works as a professor at the Freie Universität Berlin in the Institute for Cultural and Social Anthropology. Vice director, Sonja Hegasy, simultaneously works as a visiting professor at the Barenboim-Said Academy Berlin. Teaching activities by ZMO research fellows at university faculties in Berlin, throughout Germany, and abroad contribute to a close connection between teaching and research. Partnering with Humboldt-Universität zu Berlin, ZMO is the only non-university research institution involved in the Berlin Graduate School of Muslim Cultures and Societies (BGSMCS) at the Freie Universität Berlin.” ZMO is a member of the Forum Transregionale Studien at the Wissenschaftskolleg zu Berlin, a research organization focused on the internationalisation of humanities and social sciences. Each year, ZMO hosts up to three scientists in the context of ‘Europe in the Middle East – the Middle East in Europe’ (EUME), a research programme at the Forum. Ulrike Freitag and Nora Lafi lead the EUME research field ‘Cities Compared: Urban Change in the Mediterranean and Adjacent Regions’.

The centre has a long-standing network of scientific contacts at home and abroad, as well as a variety of formal and informal connections. It cooperates with a number of universities and non-university institutes in joint collaborative projects. A cooperation agreement exists with the Freie Universität Berlin. Apart from FU Berlin and Humboldt-Universität zu Berlin, ZMO's most important partners for scientific cooperation are the School of Oriental and African Studies in London (SOAS), the Centre Marc Bloch in Berlin, and the institutes of the Max Weber Foundation abroad (especially the German Orient Institutes in Beirut and Istanbul and the German Historical Institute London). ZMO is part of the Leibniz Research Alliance “Historical Authenticity”. Cooperation agreements also exist with the University of Dohuk in Iraq, the King Faisal Centre for Research and Islamic Studies in Saudi Arabia, the Institut Francais de Recherche en Afrique in Ibadan, Nigeria, and the Laboratoire d’Etudes et de Recherche sur la Dynamiques Sociales et le Développement Local in Niamey, Niger, and the International Islamic Academy of Uzbekistan in Tashkent.”

In 2012, an international cooperation began with the Beirut Archive Umam Documentation & Research for the Project "Transforming Memories: Cultural Production and Personal/Public Memory in Lebanon and Morocco" (2012-2014). Furthermore, ZMO participated in following collaborating projects:

- Crossroads Asia (2011–2014), Partner: Zentrum für Entwicklungsforschung, Institut für Orient- und Asienwissenschaften (Rheinische Friedrich-Wilhelms-Universität Bonn), Zentralasien-Seminar (HU Berlin), Centre for Development Studies (ZELF, FU Berlin)
- Phantomgrenzen in Ostmitteleuropa (2011–2014), Partner: Centre Marc Bloch, HU Berlin, Martin-Luther-Universität Halle-Wittenberg
- Urban Violence in the Middle East (2010–2013), Partner: School of Oriental and African Studies
- Participation in the Sonderforschungsbereich 640 HU Berlin
- Humanities in the European Research Area (HERA), Cultural Exchange in a Time of Global Conflict: Colonial, Neutrals and Belligerents during the First World War
- DFG-long term cooperation Das Moderne Indien in Deutschen Archiven, 1706 – 1989 (MIDA) (2014-2026).
- Spaces of Participation: Topographies of Social and Political Chance in Morocco, Egypt, and Palestine (VolkswagenStiftung 2014–2020).
- Religion, Moral und Boko in Westafrika: Studentische Laufbahnen fuer ein gutes Leben (Acronym: Remoboko), Partner: Universite Abdou Moumouni, Niamey in Niger und der University of Ibadan in Nigeria

== Publications ==
ZMO publishes a refereed book series entitled ZMO-Studien, which consists of monographs submitted by internal and external researchers, as well as edited volumes. The centre's own publication series, that presents research results in form of monographs and essays, is published in the De Gruyter publishing house, that appear both nationally and internationally. In addition, fellows publish articles and monographs in the relevant international journals and series.

Since 2010, ZMO offers the two refereed online series ZMO Programmatic Texts and ZMO Working Papers. Both are available in open access online. The ZMO Programmatic Texts publish wider conceptual articles engaging with the interdisciplinary and interregional research conducted at ZMO. The series provides a platform for authors to present and discuss innovative contributions to current theoretical and comparative debates in relation to ZMO's programmatic research agenda. ZMO Working Papers is a series of publications that reflect developments and discussions related to ZMO's research projects. Texts are usually empirically based and regionally focused and may also represent intermediate results of research.

Furthermore, ZMO publishes biannually the Orient Bulletin which informs about the events and projects at ZMO.

== Events ==
In order to discuss results of its research, ZMO organizes and hosts public lecture series, symposiums, and workshops. Additionally, individual events regarding current scientific and political topics are organised, partly in collaboration with national or international organizations. Furthermore, ZMO offers cultural events in collaboration with cultural organizations and foundations in Germany, such as an annual Open Day, film series and festivals, exhibits, panel discussions and public lectures.

== Library ==
The reference library at the Leibniz-Zentrum Moderner Orient was founded in 1992. It is closely linked to the centre's research programme and currently holds approx. 85000 volumes and about 60 periodic als. Envisaged as an academic research library to accommodate the centre's key areas of research, it focuses on procuring new publications in the field of ethnology and political science dealing with countries in the Middle East, Africa and South Asia. Special emphasis is given to relevance and rapid procurement, as well as to publications from the countries concerned. In January 2020, new library stocks comprised 37504 volumes.

Apart from this regular stock, further valuable sources and rare books are contained in the deposit library section of the Academy of Sciences of the German Democratic Republic, and in the estates of Fritz and Gertraud Steppat, African historian Jürgen Herzog, Middle East historian Gerhard Höpp, and Indologist Horst Krüger, all of which were donated to the centre. The mentioned estates have been acquired in the online catalogue.

== Sponsorship Association ==
Since 1996, ZMO has brrn part of the association Geisteswissenschaftliche Zentren Berlin e.V., that the other Leibniz-associated organizations Leibniz Centre General Linguistics (ZAS) and the Leibniz Centre for Literature and Cultural Research (ZFL) belong to as well.

== Association for the Support of ZMO (Gesellschaft zur Förderung des ZMO) ==
The Gesellschaft zur Förderung des ZMO e.V. was founded on 26 January 2007, in light of the ten-year anniversary of the Leibniz-Zentrum Moderner Orient that was celebrated in 2006. The organization works solely in a non-profit fashion. It supports ZMO intrinsically and materially, for example through consultation, mediating contacts, financing events, and offering scholarships for young researchers. ZMO is supported in its scientific endeavours, in publications, and through the organization and conduction of public information sessions, lectures, or discussion rounds.

Head of the association is Dr. Peter Heine, scholar of Islam and founding director of ZMO from 1996 to 1998. Vice director is PD Dr. Katrin Bromber, scholar of African Studies and head of the research unit “Age and Generation” of ZMO. Dr. Bettina Gräf, scholar of Islamic Studies and former member of ZMO is the treasurer of the association. Prof. Dr. Udo Steinbach, scholar of Islamic Studies and head of the Deutscher Orient-Institut from 1976 to 2007, and Prof. Dr. Ulrike Freitag, scholar of Islamic Studies and director of ZMO since 2002, are members of the board as well.
