= Leibniz Institute of Agricultural Development in Transition Economies =

Economic research institute in Halle, Germany

Coordinates: 51°29′42″N 11°56′17″E

Leibniz Institute of Agricultural Development in Transition Economies (IAMO)
- Established: 1994
- Board of Directors: Alfons Balmann, Thomas Glauben, Katja Guhr, Thomas Herzfeld
- Faculty: Agricultural Economics, Economics, Social Science
- Staff: around 170
- Address: Theodor-Lieser-Straße 2, 06120 Halle (Saale), Germany
- Location: Halle (Saale), Germany
- Website: www.iamo.de/en

Leibniz Institute of Agricultural Development in Transition Economies (German: Leibniz-Institut für Agrarentwicklung in Transformationsökonomien) is a research institute located in Halle (Saale), Germany. IAMO pursues basic and applied research in the field of agricultural economics. It analyses economic, social and political processes of change in the agricultural and food sector, and in rural areas. The geographic focus covers the enlarging EU, transition regions of Central, Eastern and South Eastern Europe, as well as Central and Eastern Asia.

== Main research areas ==
IAMO analyses the political, external environment of agriculture and its scope of design, the agricultural and food sector markets, and the structural development of enterprises in rural areas. Moreover, it embraces the interdependencies of market processes, managerial decisions and policies on the environment and rural areas. Research activities of the institute are grouped to four main areas:

- Policies and institutions
- Natural resource use
- Livelihoods in rural areas
- Organization of agriculture
- Agricultural value chains
