= Berlin University Alliance =

Consortium of universities in Berlin, Germany

- Formation: 21 February 2018; 8 years ago
- Location(s): Berlin, Germany
- Website: www.berlin-university-alliance.de

The Berlin University Alliance is a consortium of three universities and one hospital in Berlin: the Free University of Berlin, the Humboldt University of Berlin, the Technische Universität Berlin, and the Charité – Berlin University of Medicine.

Partner universities of the Berlin University Alliance, for instance the Free University of Berlin, the Technische Universität Berlin (also member of TU9) and the Humboldt University of Berlin, are highly ranked within Germany and abroad, with all of the aforementioned given the status of Germany's Universities of Excellence - the German Ivy League of public institutions.

In 2019 the Alliance has won funding of 24 million euros per annum in the Universities of Excellence funding line of the Excellence Strategy for its future concept ‘Crossing Boundaries toward an Integrated Research Environment’.

In the Excellence Strategy research competition run by the German federal and state governments, the following seven Clusters of Excellence of the Alliance have been approved. As of 2019, the interdisciplinary research projects are each being funded in the Clusters of Excellence funding line for seven years with up to ten million euros per annum.

- MATH+: The Berlin Mathematics Research Center
- Matters of Activity: Image Space Material – A new culture of material
- NeuroCure – New perspectives in the therapy of neurological diseases
- SCIoI – Science of Intelligence – Learning to understand intelligence
- Scripts – Global challenges for liberal democracy as a model of organization
- Temporal Communities – A global perspective on literature
- Unifying Systems in Catalysis (UniSysCat) – Sustainability needs catalysis research

Artificial intelligence research institutes:

- The Berlin Institute for the Foundations of Learning and Data (BIFOLD), a German national competence center for AI research
- The Alliance is one of the German national high performance computing locations
