= Weierstrass Institute =

Research institute in Berlin, Germany

Coordinates: 52.512610°N 13.396084°E

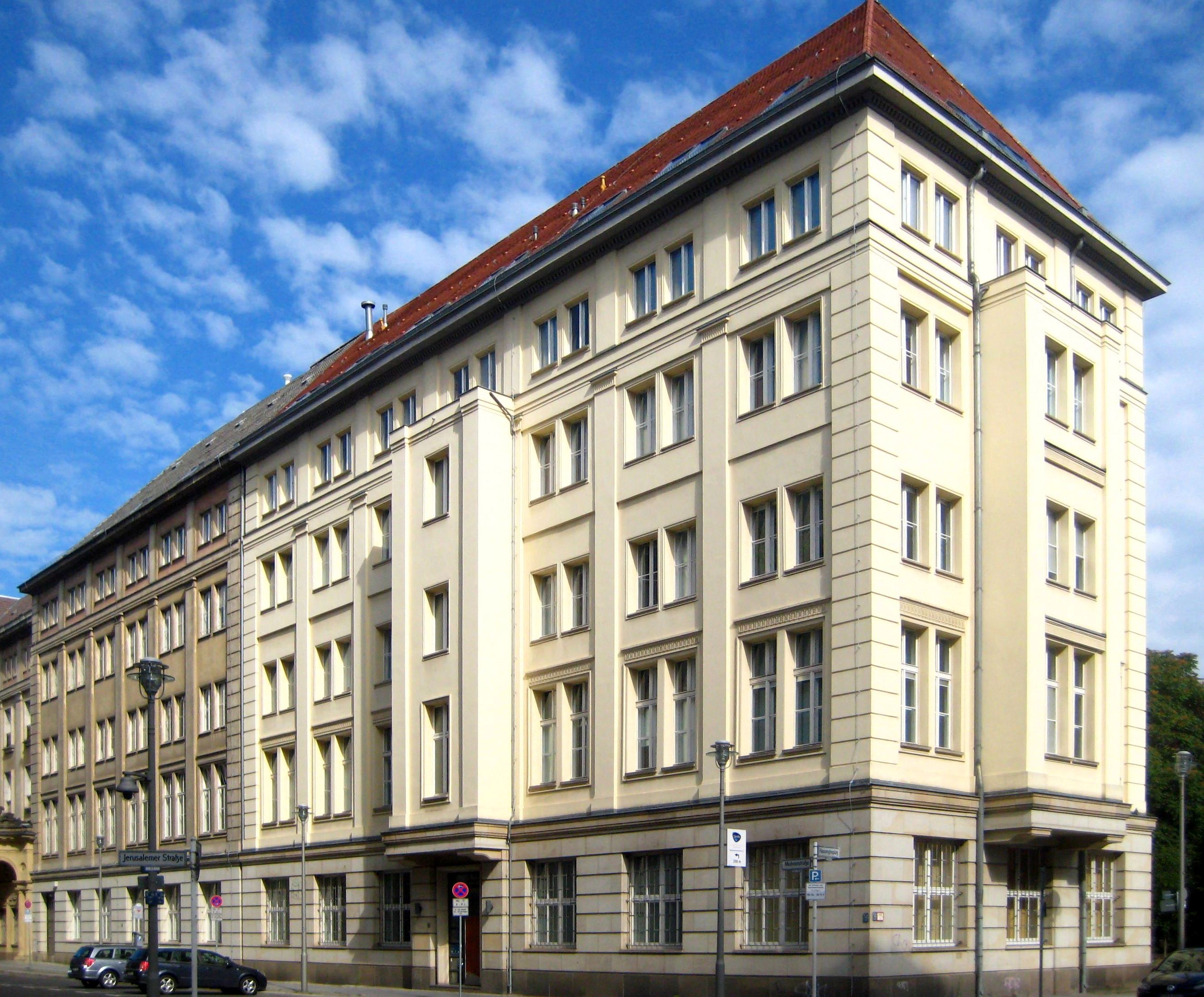
- Abbreviation: WIAS
- Predecessor: Karl Weierstrass Institute for Mathematics of the GDR's Academy of Science
- Formation: 1992
- Type: Research Institute
- Purpose: Pure and applied mathematical research
- Location: Berlin
- Director: Michael Hintermüller
- Parent organization: Forschungsverbund Berlin e.V.
- Affiliations: Leibniz Association
- Staff: ~150
- Website: www.wias-berlin.de

The Weierstrass Institute for Applied Analysis and Stochastics (WIAS), is a part of the Forschungsverbund Berlin e.V. and a member of the Leibniz Association. Based in Berlin’s district Mitte, the institute's research activities involve applied and pure mathematics.

Since February 2011, the International Mathematical Union (IMU) Secretariat has been located in Berlin at WIAS.

== History ==
The institute developed from the “Karl Weierstrass Institute for Mathematics” of the former GDR's Academy of Sciences at Berlin. Following a recommendation of the German Council of Science and Humanities, the institute was established on January 1, 1992.

The institute is named after the Berlin mathematician Karl Weierstraß (1815–1897), who was well known for his profound processing of analysis.

== Tasks ==
The main task of WIAS is the implementation of project-oriented research in applied mathematics, especially in applied analysis and stochastics. The research activity is oriented on specific application situations and is confirmed by cooperations with scientific institutions and the economy. It includes the entire spectrum of the solution, from mathematical modeling to mathematical-theoretical analysis of models, up to the development of algorithms and numerical simulation of technological processes.

Research at WIAS focuses on the following application areas:

- Nano- and Optoelectronics,
- Optimization and control in technology and economy,
- Materials modeling,
- Flow and transport,
- Conversion, storage and distribution of energy,
- Random phenomena in nature and economy.

Within these application areas, questions are investigated, that play a central role in the development of key technologies (e. g. materials science, manufacturing engineering, biomedical engineering), as well as applications in the economy (e. g. finances).

Services are not part of the tasks.

== Cooperation ==
WIAS cooperates closely with university and non-university institutions and is involved in numerous joint research projects, for which additional funds are raised within the framework of competition procedures (e. g. of the German Research Foundation or the European Commission.)

Close relationships are maintained with the three Berlin universities, Humboldt University, Technical University and Free University, through cooperation contracts and six joint appeals based on these contracts. Together with the mathematical institutes of these universities and the Zuse Institute Berlin WIAS operates the Berlin mathematical center of excellence, MATHEON.

Within the Leibniz Association WIAS coordinates a network “Mathematical Modeling and Simulation”.

== Infrastructure ==
The total budget of the institute was 12.9 million euros in 2015, of which the federal and state governments, within the framework of the basic funding, financed 9.5 million euros equally. Approximately 150 people work at WIAS.
