= WISTA =

Science park in Germany

Coordinates: 52.430226°N 13.531154°E

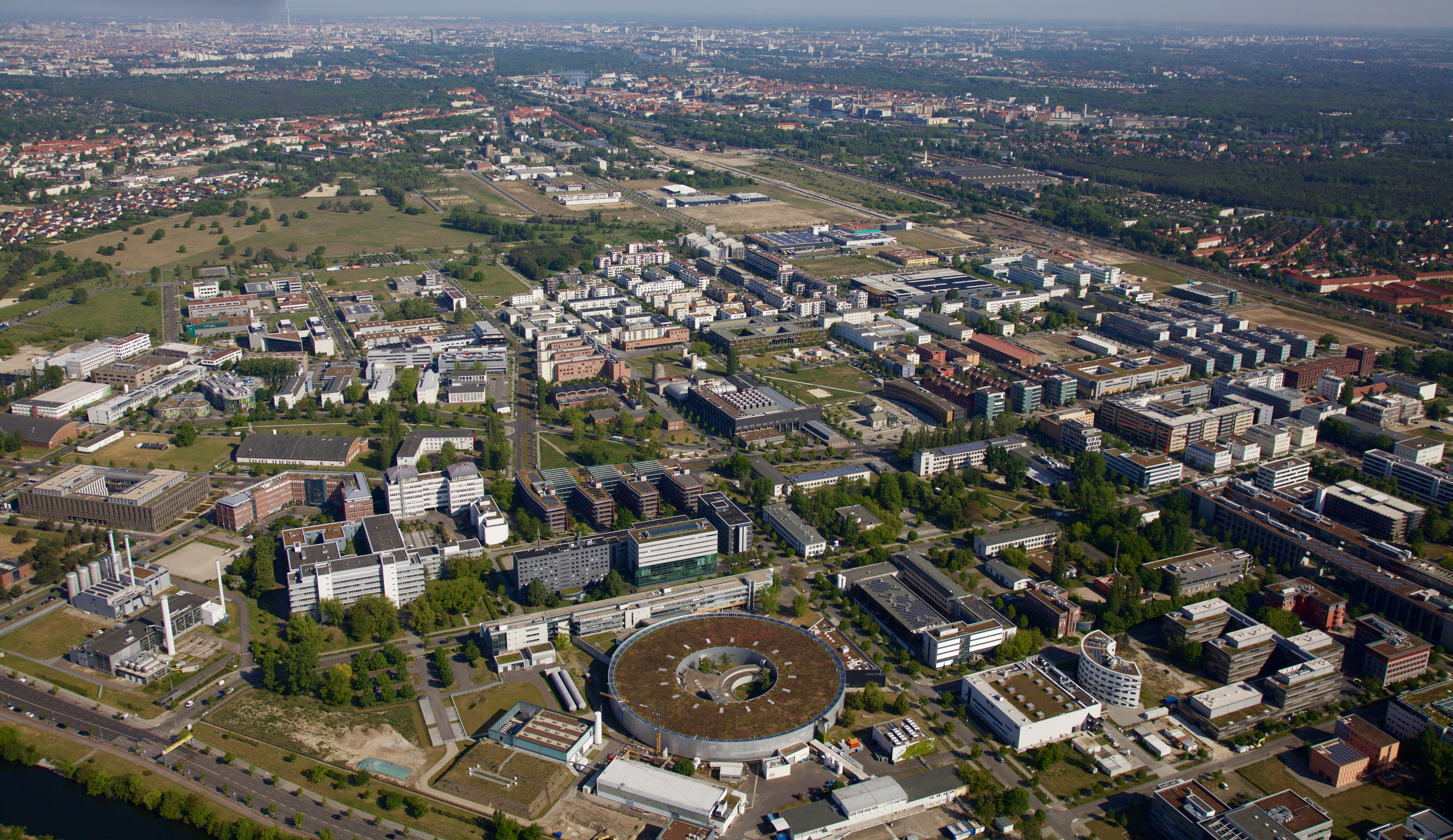
The WISTA science park – aerial view 2019

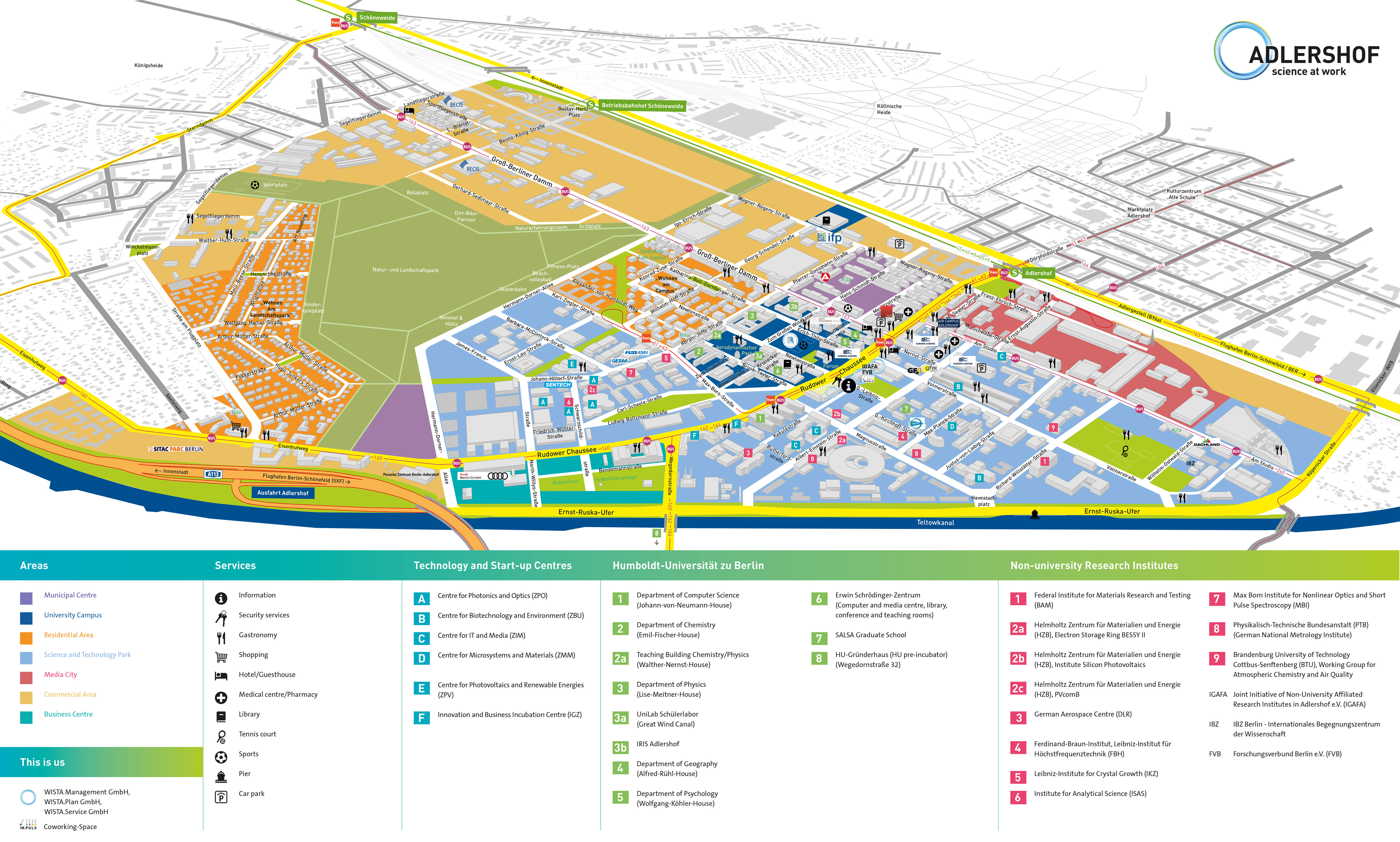
Map of the Technology Park Adlershof (WISTA)

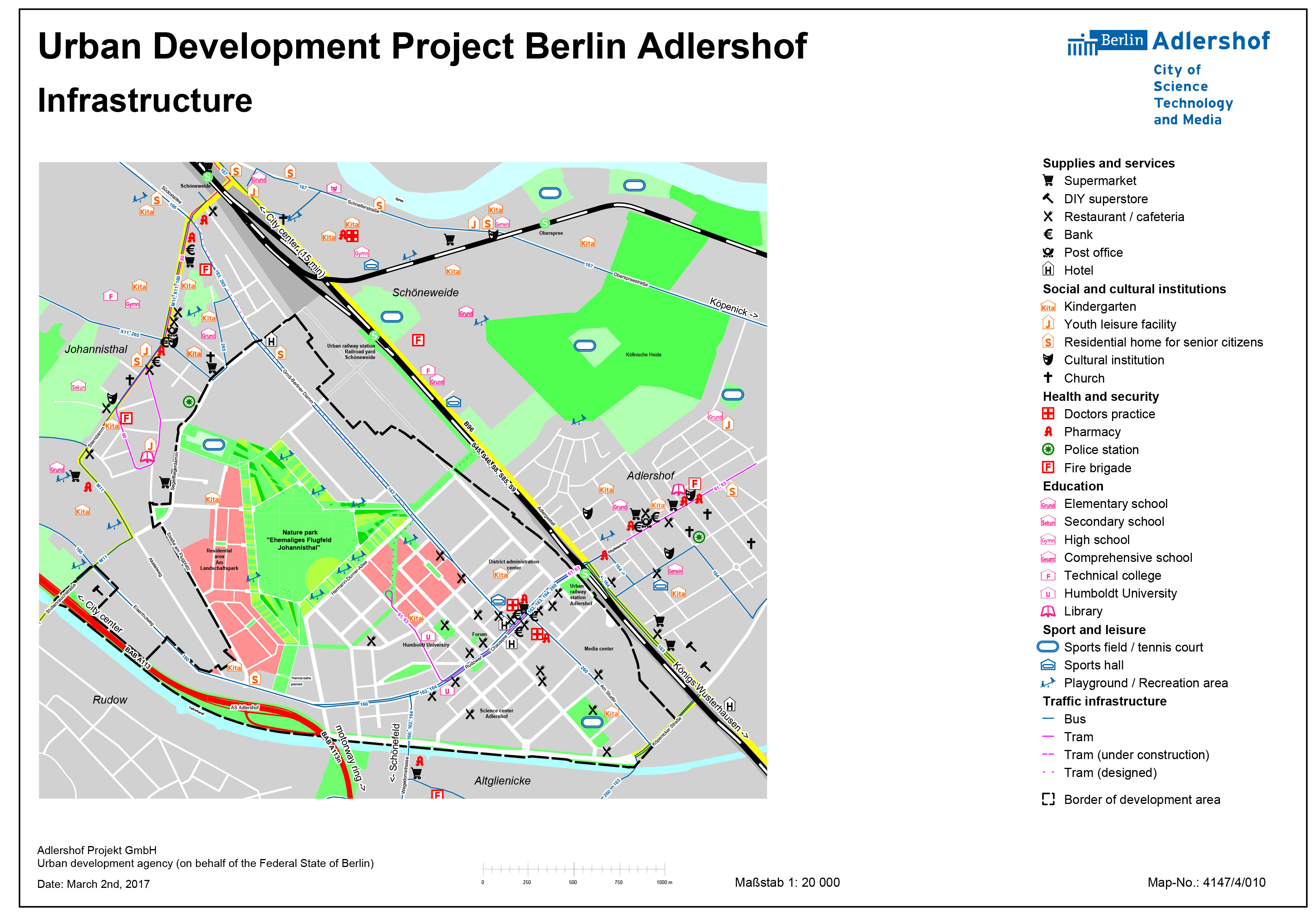
Infrastructure Map of WISTA – Adlershof

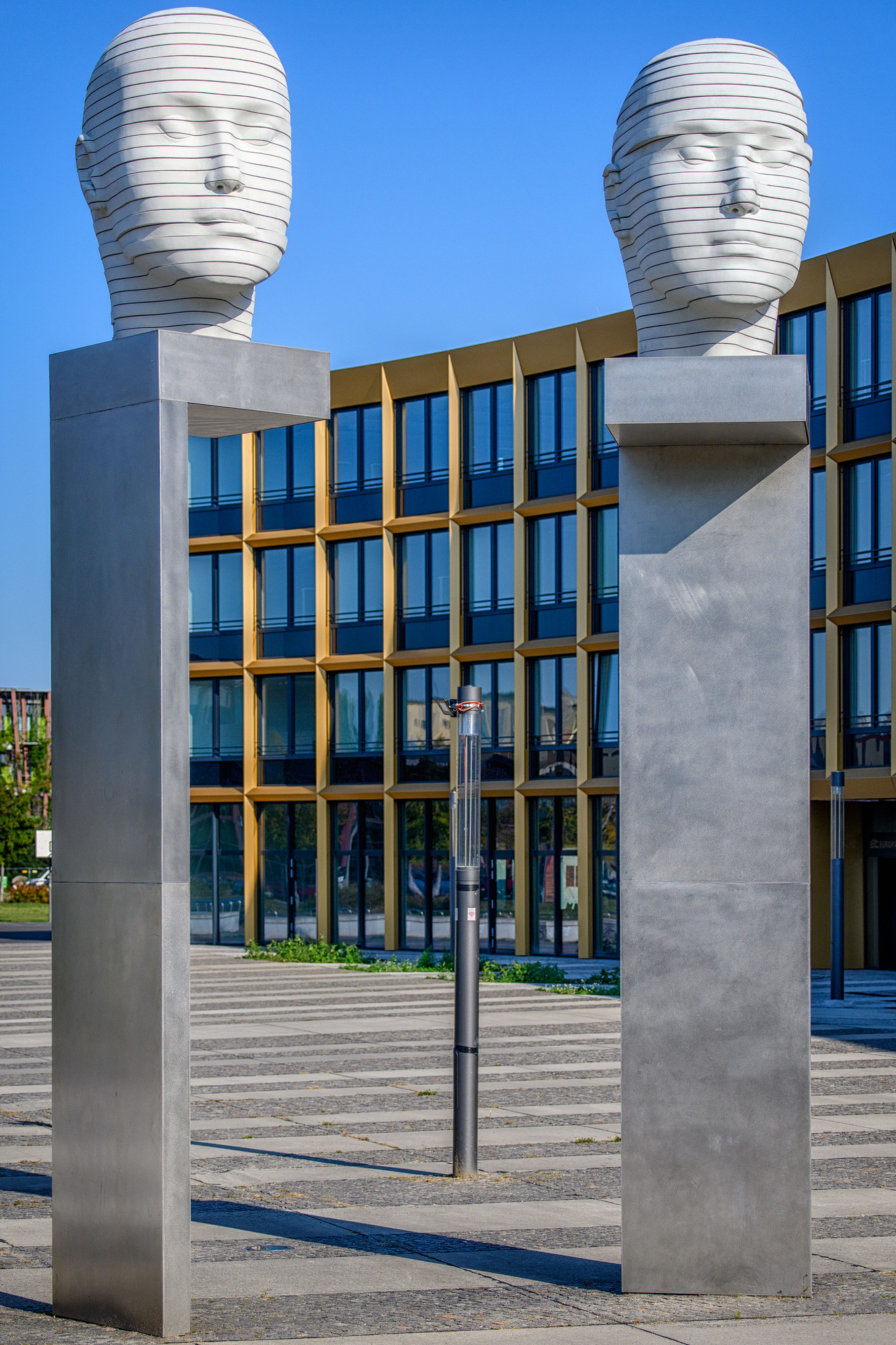
Central place on the WISTA, the Forum Adlershof with the installation "Two heads in motion"

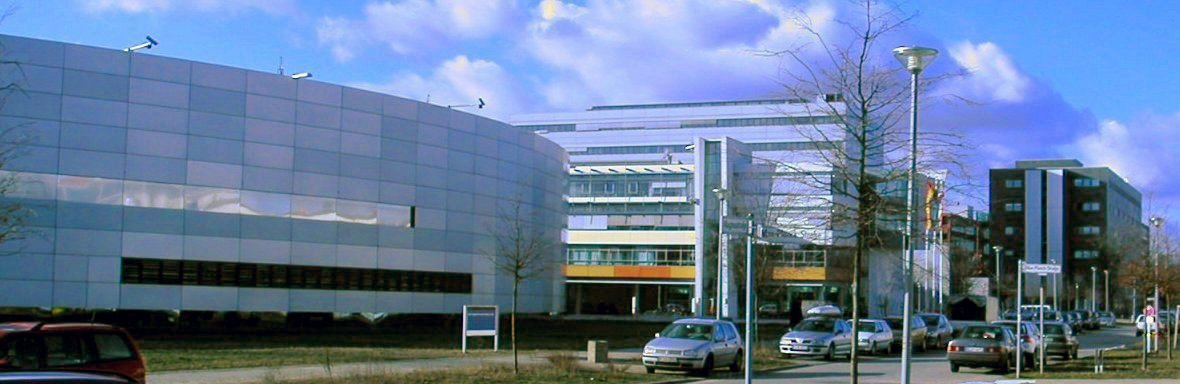
The Bessy synchrotron with a view on some science buildings

The WISTA Science and Technology Park in Berlin-Adlershof was founded in 1991 after the dissolution of the Academy of Sciences of the German Democratic Republic at the same place. Today it covers an area of 4.2 square kilometres (1.6 sq mi) making it the largest science park in Germany.

== History ==
The existence of technology centers at Adlershof dates back well into the late 19th and early 20th centuries - the Berlin–Görlitz railway had reached the Berlin suburb of Adlershof in 1867 and the population increased from 743 in 1875 to 5591 in 1895 following the industrialization in the area. The decision to build the Teltow Canal (1900 - 1906) furthered the development of businesses in the area between the old town (in the north) and the canal (in the south). In 1909 the Johannisthal Air Field opened in the west of the area and a number of institutions settled in Adlershof, including the German Research Institute for Aviation (today German Aerospace Center). During the wars the area was used as a technology development center for aviation and radio telecommunications - for some time the large 36 meter radio telescope was an icon of the area.

After the total destruction of Berlin in 1945, the new Eastern Government decided to move the German Academy of Sciences to Adlershof. In 1950 to 1952 the media centers of the Deutscher Fernsehfunk television broadcaster were built in Adlershof. The aviation field was closed down (as air transport had been moved to Berlin-Schönefeld Airport a few miles away) and the guards regiment Feliks Dzierzynski (12,000 soldiers) occupied the military buildings.

After the German reunification almost all institutions at Adlershof were closed down during 1990/1991. The infrastructure was old and not up to date with the technology level of West Germany however the available area had the best premises to build a modern one. Berlin did found the Redevelopment Company Adlershof Ltd (Entwicklungsgesellschaft Adlershof mbH - EGA) in 1991 and it was renamed to WISTA Management Ltd (WISTA-Management GmbH) in 1994 as the plans for a new science and technology park took shape. Since then, it helps developing the cluster partly like a business incubator, with network management, communication and marketing, acceleration of special fields of technology and acquisition of projects, investments and companies.

The name WISTA is not officially explained as an abbreviation although at the time the full name was "WISTA - Wissenschafts- und Wirtschaftsstandort Adlershof" (WISTA - Science and Business Location Adlershof) so that WI-ST-A points to a previous project name "WIssenschaftsSTandort Adlershof" (Science Location Adlershof) while much of the press refers to the area as "Wissenschaftsstadt Adlershof" (Science City Adlershof) leading to the same abbreviation. In fact WISTA was included in the Expo 2000 fairs under the name of "Berlin Adlershof – Stadt für Wissenschaft, Wirtschaft und Medien" (Berlin Adlershof - City of Science, Business and Media) corroborating the correspondence.

Since its founding, more than 1,200 companies and scientific institutions settled down in the Science City Adlershof. Between 1998 and 2003 the gradual relocation of the Humboldt University's scientific departments realized from downtown Berlin to Adlershof, the Faculty of Mathematics and Natural Sciences with the Institutes of Chemistry, Computer Science, Mathematics, Physics and the Institute of Geography as well as the Institute of Psychology of the Faculty of Life Sciences domiciled on the Adlershof campus.

At the end of 2007 the redevelopment legislation for Adlershof were lifted. In 2008 the area advanced to the north-west building the Hermann Dörner Avenue (Hermann-Dörner-Allee). In 2011 the tram line was extended to run right through the science and technology park. Today the BESSY synchrotron is something of an icon for the area. There is still room for extension of the science park using the industrial area along the earlier airfield in the west and the earlier shunting station in the north. Developments plans for a housing project west of the earlier airfield (today a grassland recreational area) have been scrapped with new homes being single and duplex houses.

== Numbers ==
The Berlin Adlershof Science City is one of the most successful high-technology sites in Germany and Berlin’s largest media site. It is home to 1,203 companies and scientific institutions (Dec 2019) on an area of 4.2 km^{2} – embedded in an integrated urban planning concept. 23,500 people work and 6,458 study here.

The companies and non-university research institutes in the Adlershof Science and Technology Park at the heart of the Adlershof Science City focus on:

- Photonics and Optics,
- Renewable Energies and Photovoltaics,
- Microsystems and Materials,
- IT and Media,
- Biotechnology and Environment.

Moreover, there are six scientific institutes of the Humboldt-Universität zu Berlin (Chemistry, Geography, Computer Sciences, Mathematics, Physics, and Psychology).

In the direct vicinity, an ensemble of meanwhile 454 commercial enterprises, shops, hotels and restaurants has been created in addition to the Media City with its 189 companies. Here, as well as on the approximately 45-hectare area of the Schöneweide marshalling yard ("Gleislinse"), which was closed in 1998, the Science and Technology Park has ideal space for further growth.

Adlershof is not just a place of work. Single-family homes, rented and owner-occupied apartments, townhouses and student apartments have been built. In 2019, around 4,000 people were already living in the Adlershof development area. Further residential developments are currently in construction.

- 6 departments of the Humboldt-Universität zu Berlin (Chemistry, Computer Science, Mathematics, Physics, Psychology, Geography) with 6,458 students and 980 personnel
- 1,851 employees work at 8 Non-university research institutions
- 548 science companies with 7,945 employees in the science and technology park
- 189 media companies with 2,960 employees in the television and media park
- 454 support companies with 9,764 employees

== See also ==
- German Silicon Valley
