= Adlershof =

- Quarter of Berlin
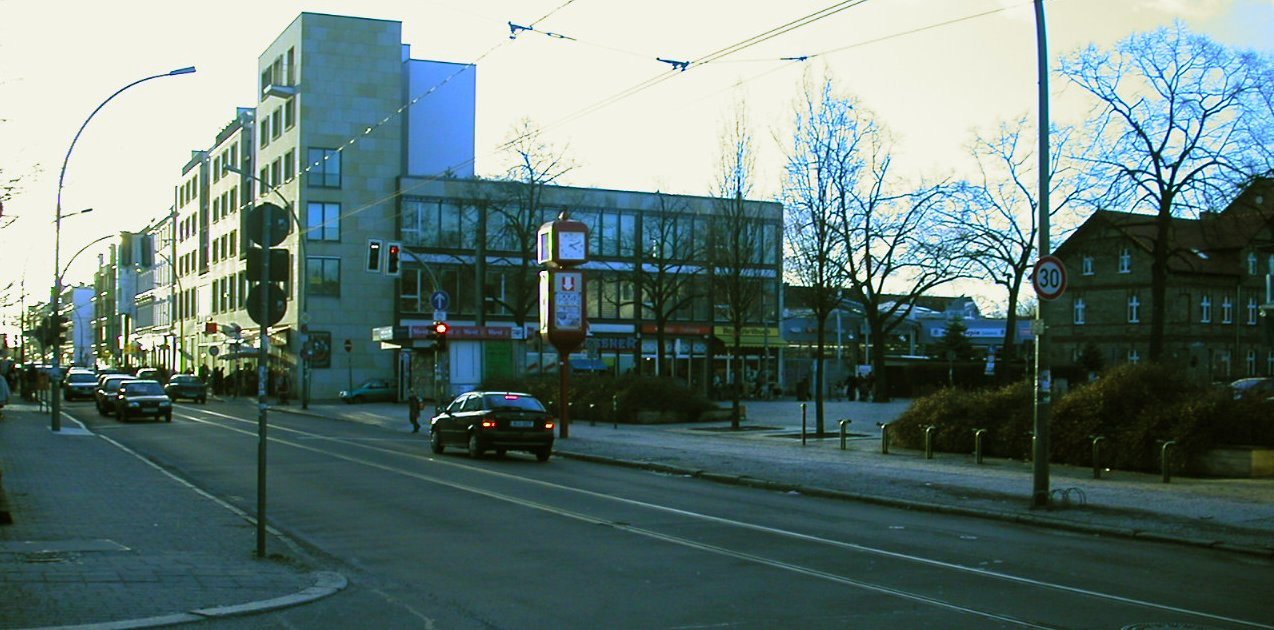
- Marktplatz (market square)

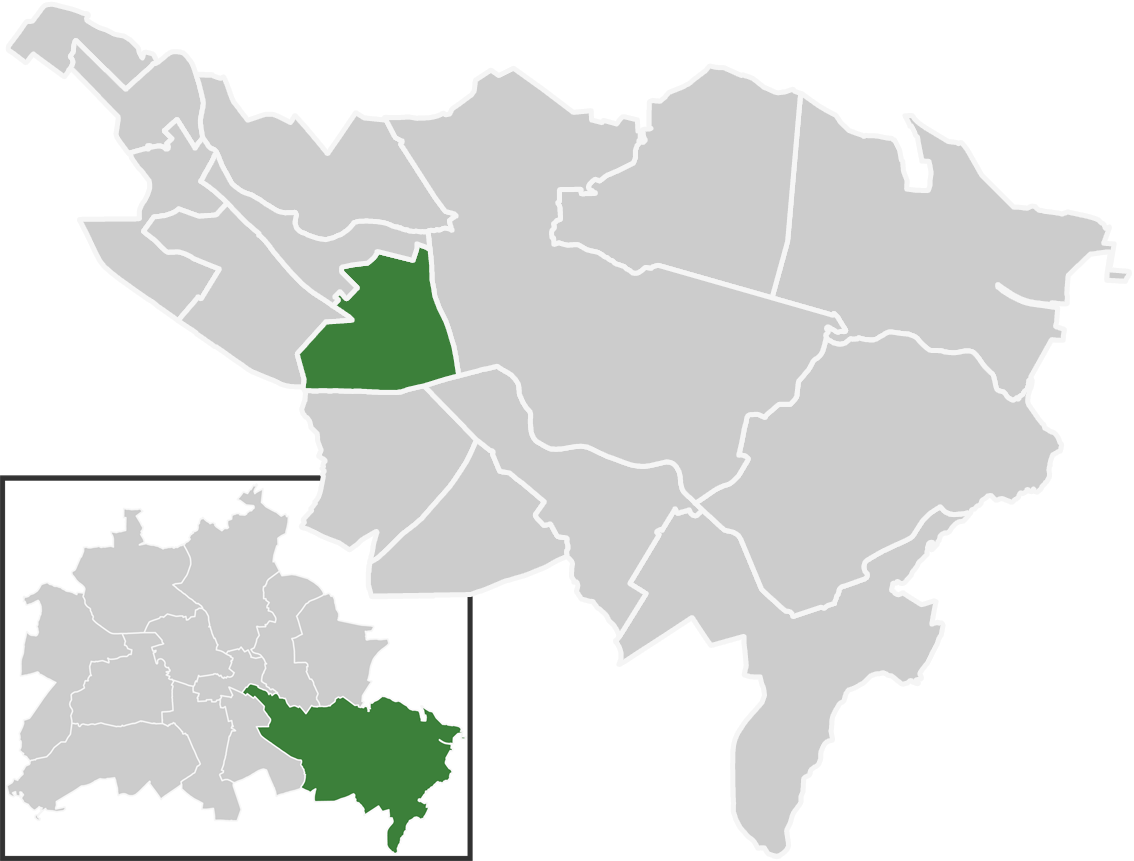
- Location of Adlershof in Treptow-Köpenick and Berlin
- Interactive map of Adlershof
- Location within Germany Location within Berlin
- Coordinates: 52°26′16″N 13°32′51″E
- Country: Germany
- State: Berlin
- City: Berlin
- Borough: Treptow-Köpenick
- Founded: 1749
- Subdivisions: 2 zones

Area
  - Total: 6.11 km^{2} (2.36 sq mi)
- Elevation: 34 m (112 ft)

Population (2024-12-31)
  - Total: 22,417
  - Density: 3,670/km^{2} (9,500/sq mi)
- Time zone: UTC+01:00 (CET)
  - Summer (DST): UTC+02:00 (CEST)
- Postal codes: 12489
- Vehicle registration: B
- Website: www.adlershof.de

Adlershof (German: [ˈaːdlɐsˌhoːf], literally "Eagle's Court") is a locality (Ortsteil) in the borough (Bezirk) Treptow-Köpenick of Berlin, Germany.

Adlershof is home to the new City of Science, Technology and Media (WISTA), located on the southwestern edge of the locality.

== History ==
A part of the area known today as the "City of Science, Technology and Media", was once known as the Johannisthal Air Field. Germany's first motorized aircraft took off from here at the beginning of the 20th century. Albatros, Fokker, Rumpler and Wright made Adlershof-Johannisthal famous. In 1912 the German Experimental Institute for Aviation (Deutsche Versuchsanstalt für Luftfahrt – DVL) made Adlershof its headquarters. Laboratories, motor test beds, wind tunnels and hangars were erected in the 20s and 30s and are historical landmarks today.

=== World War I ===
Adlershof is particularly well known for a series of competitions between various aviation firms' fighter aircraft designs that were held there starting in 1918. This was the first time the pilots themselves were asked for their input into the selection process; they resoundingly asked for higher speed as opposed to maneuverability, which the Idflieg had always assumed was most important.

The first of these contests, held in January 1918, led to the Fokker D.VII winning the competition and going on to become one of Germany's most successful fighter planes. A second competition in May and June led to the acceptance of several of the main contest entries, the Pfalz D.XII, Fokker E.V, Junkers D.I and Siemens-Schuckert D.IV, the later of which is considered by many to be Germany's best design of the war. All three were put into production largely in order to make up for the slow production of the Fokkers, although only the Pfalz design could be found in any number. A final war-time contest in October was too late to have any effect on the war effort. Even after the war the process continued, with a fourth competition between February and May 1919, but the signing of the Versailles Treaty ended all military aircraft work in Germany and led to the dissolution of the Luftstreitkräfte in May 1920.

=== The East German era ===
After World War II, the airport was closed and from then on three institutions determined Adlershof's destiny:

- The Ministry of State Security (MfS) stationed its 12,000 strong Guard Regiment there.
- In 1952 East Germany's National Television began broadcasting from Adlershof.
- And the East German Academy of Science was established with nine scientific institutes in the fields of physics and chemistry. "Scientific Equipment Engineering" with its approx. 1,700 workers developed and produced a majority of East Germany's research equipment.

A substantial portion of the research done at the academy institutes was notable for its close connection with the industry, allowing the scientists to engage in worldwide networks. Adlershof produced many known products and inventions, such as ultra-short pulse lasers, time-resolved optical spectroscopy and space diagnosis devices. Other things like trifocals and contraceptive pills were also invented here. In 1989 over 5,600 people were working in Adlershof, more than half the R&D capacity of the whole Science Academy.

=== Reunification ===
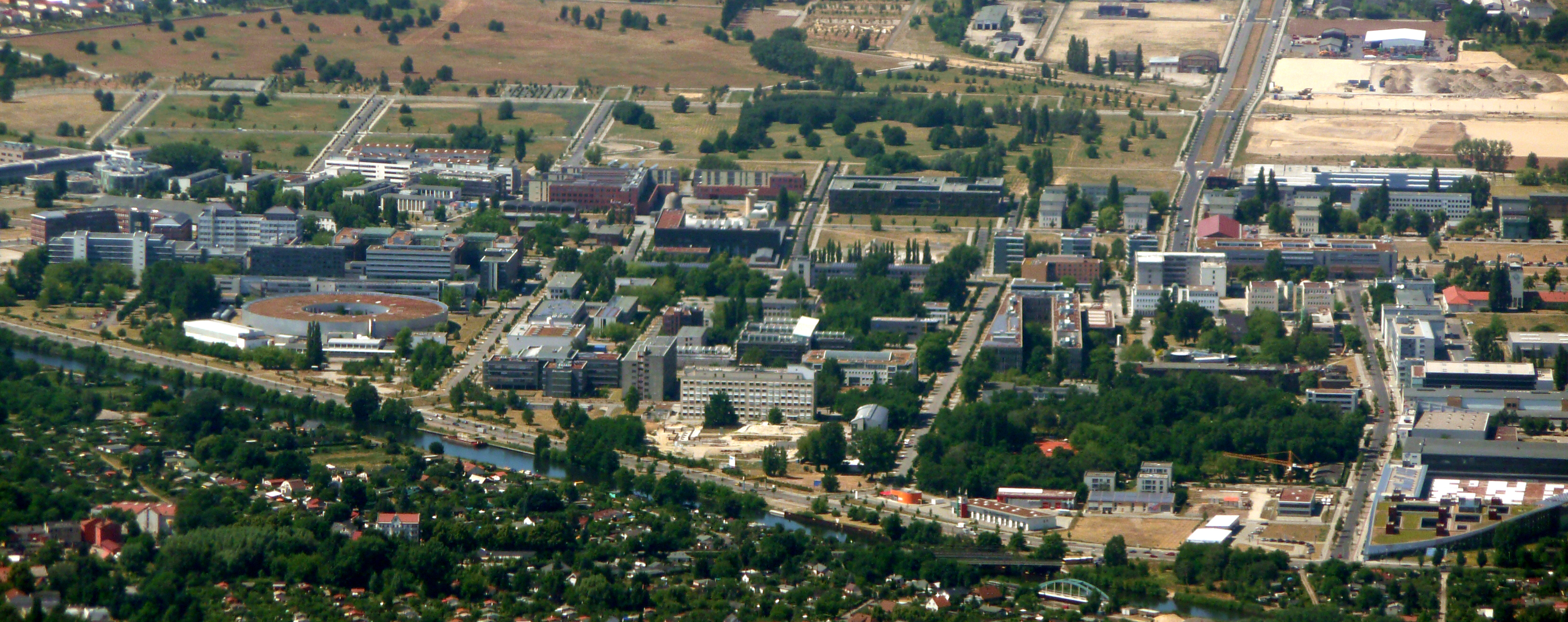
Aerial view of the WISTA Science and Technology Park in Adlershof

After German reunification, the guard regiment was dissolved and the fate of the academy was sealed by the German Unification Treaty: The research facilities of the academy were subjected to an evaluation marathon by the German Council of Science and Humanities (Wissenschaftsrat), which established that there were about 1,500 Academy employees who ought to be placed in new research structures. For the rest of the former employees, it was recommended that they either find new jobs or start their own companies. So of the 250 newly founded companies, approx 100 were founded by ex-academy workers. Today almost 90 per cent of the companies co-operate with at least one partner, and 60 per cent with three or more partners at the site.

Eight of the 12 research institutes now located in Adlershof and financed by Berlin and the Federal Republic of Germany are directly descended from the former GDR Academy of Sciences at the beginning of 1992 and integrated into the Federal German research landscape. They continued their activity under the responsibility of other bodies for example under the Max Planck Society, or affiliated to large research establishments like the "Joint Initiative of Non-University Research Institutions in Adlershof – IGAFA".

=== Development ===
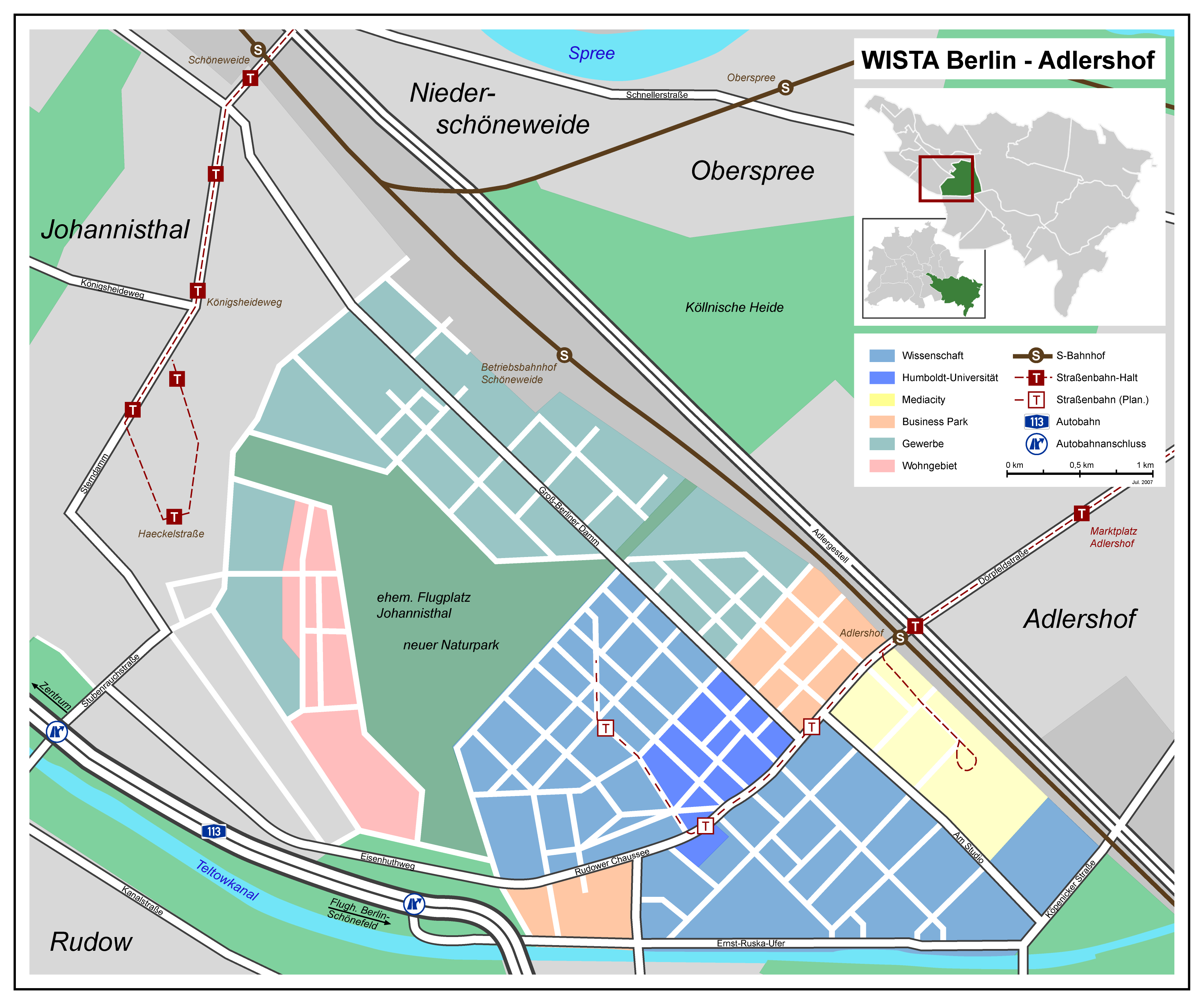
Map of the development area "Wista Berlin-Adlershof"

In September 1991 the State of Berlin founded the "Adlershof Development Society" (EGA), from which WISTA-MANAGEMENT GMBH emerged in 1994. In 1992 the Senate of Berlin decided to establish an "integrated scientific and business landscape" on the Adlershof site and made building investments amounting to about 230 million euros. The goal was to bring together the synergies from science and industry, innovation to market.

To encourage innovative businesses to settle here, modern specialised centres were established on the premises, some in reconstructed old buildings, and others in new buildings with spectacular architecture. The first was the Innovation and Business Incubation Centre in 1991, followed by the Centre for Photonics and Optical Technologies; the Centre for Environmental, Bio and Energy Technology; the Centre for Information and Media Technology; and the Centre for Materials and Microsystems Technology; Service-Centre and the East-West Co-operation Centre for Middle and Eastern European Entrepreneurs. Up to the end of the year 2000 WISTA-MANAGEMENT GMBH had made investments to the amount of approximately 325 million euros.

=== Prospects of the Humboldt campus ===
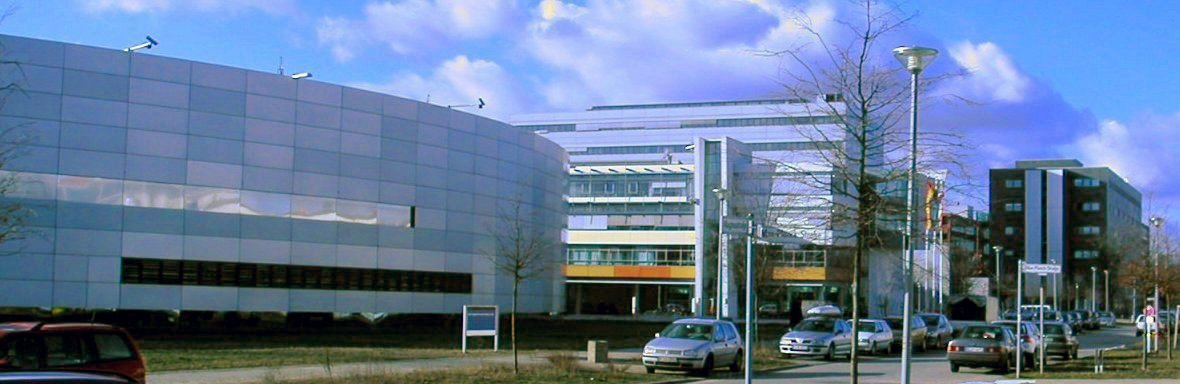
The BESSY and FIRST buildings at WISTA campus

At the end of 1991 the decision was made to relocate the mathematics and natural science faculties of the Humboldt University of Berlin to Adlershof. In 1998 the Department of Computer Science moved to Adlershof, followed by the Departments of Mathematics in 2000, Chemistry in 2001, and Physics, Geography and Psychology in 2003. One of the most modern libraries in Europe, the new Information and Communication Centre "Erwin Schrödinger-Zentrum", is a computing centre, library and a technology transfer point which can be used jointly by both university and non-university institutions alike.

City of Science, Technology and Media

- Area: 4.2 square kilometres (1,000 acres)
- Staff: approx. 14,200
- Enterprises: 814
- Science and Technology Park

Investments 1991–2008: EUR 1.7 billion

Status of Development

- Revenues of businesses and budgets of science facilities: 2.2 billion EUR (including subsidies and third-party funds)

Companies

- 410 innovative companies, approx. 4,800 staff

Scientific Institutes

- 11 non-university research institutes with about 1,600 employees, among them 795 scientists

Humboldt-University of Berlin

- 6 natural science institutes (Institute for Computer Science, Mathematics, Chemistry, Physics, Geography and Psychology), 130 professors, approx. 6,700 students and 870 other staff

Media City

- 147 companies, approx. 1,870 staff (including freelancers)

Industrial Estate

- 257 companies, approx. 5,000 staff

Landscapepark

- Area: 660,000 m^{2}

Adlershof is the location of Am Studio 20D, the venue for the European League of Legends Championship Series from 2015 to the present.
