= Wissenschaftspark Leipzig =

Research site in Leipzig, Germany

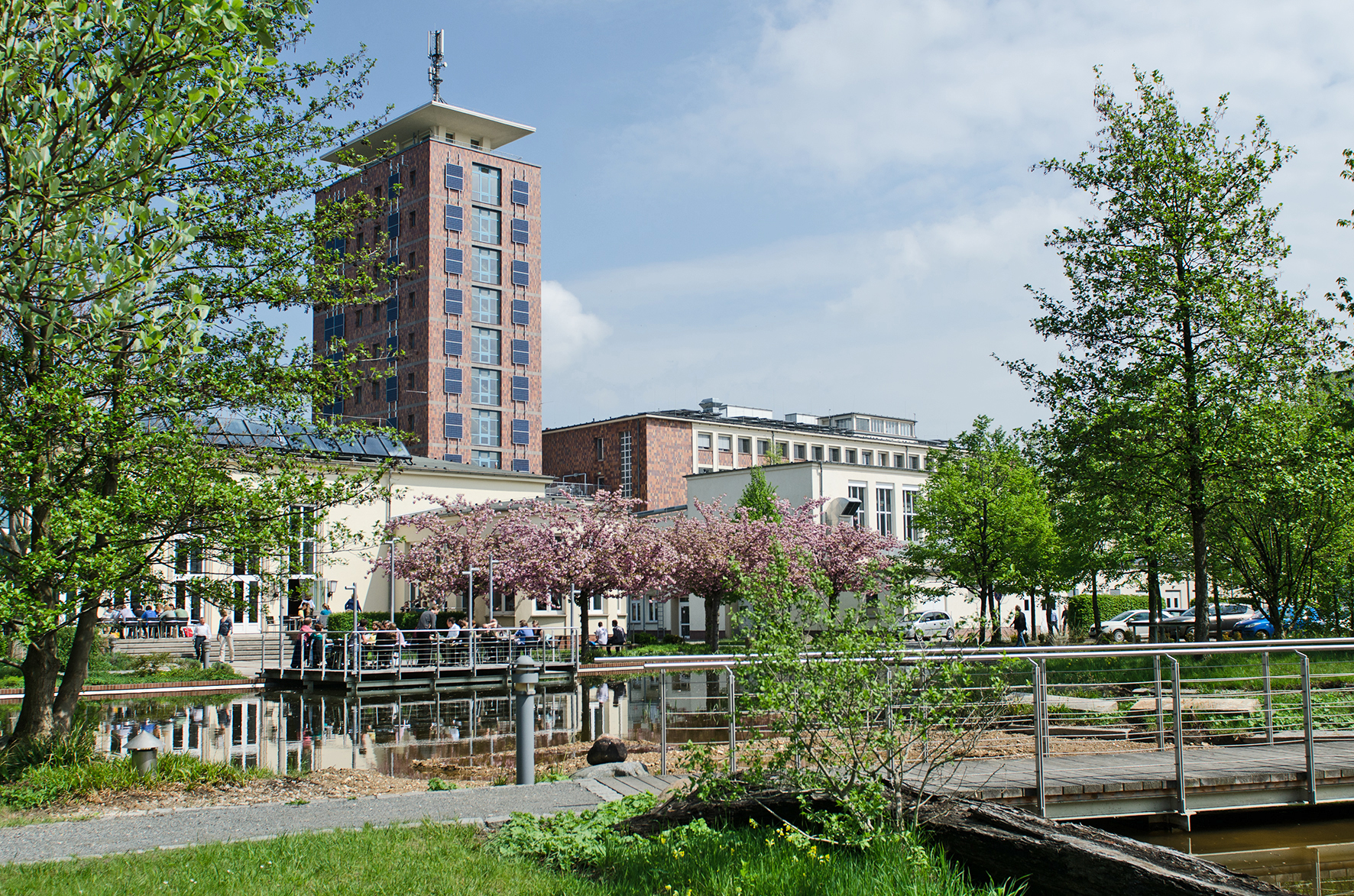
- At the Wissenschaftspark (science park) in Leipzig, 2013
- Established: 1998
- Managing board: Sabine König, Kathrin Niehuus, Daniel R. Strecker
- Location: Leipzig, Germany; 51°21′8″N 12°25′58″E
- Affiliations: Seven university affiliated institutes, companies and non-university research facilities, which belong to the Helmholtz Association or the Leibniz Association

Wissenschaftspark Leipzig (in English: Leipzig Science Park) refers to both a research site in the Leipzig borough northeast and an registered association of the institutions represented there (Wissenschaftspark Leipzig/Permoserstraße e. V.).

The tasks worked on by the represented institutions range from basic scientific research to the application of its results to the production of scientific equipment.

== Location ==
The Wissenschaftspark is located in the Leipzig locality of Sellerhausen-Stünz, about 4 kilometres (2 miles) from the city center. It is bordered in the west by Torgauer Strasse, in the south by Permoserstrasse, in the east by the track area of the Leipzig-Wahren–Leipzig-Engelsdorf railway and in the north by the site of the Deutsches Biomasseforschungszentrum (German Biomass Research Center). It occupies an area of about 16 hectares (40 acres).

== Affiliate network ==
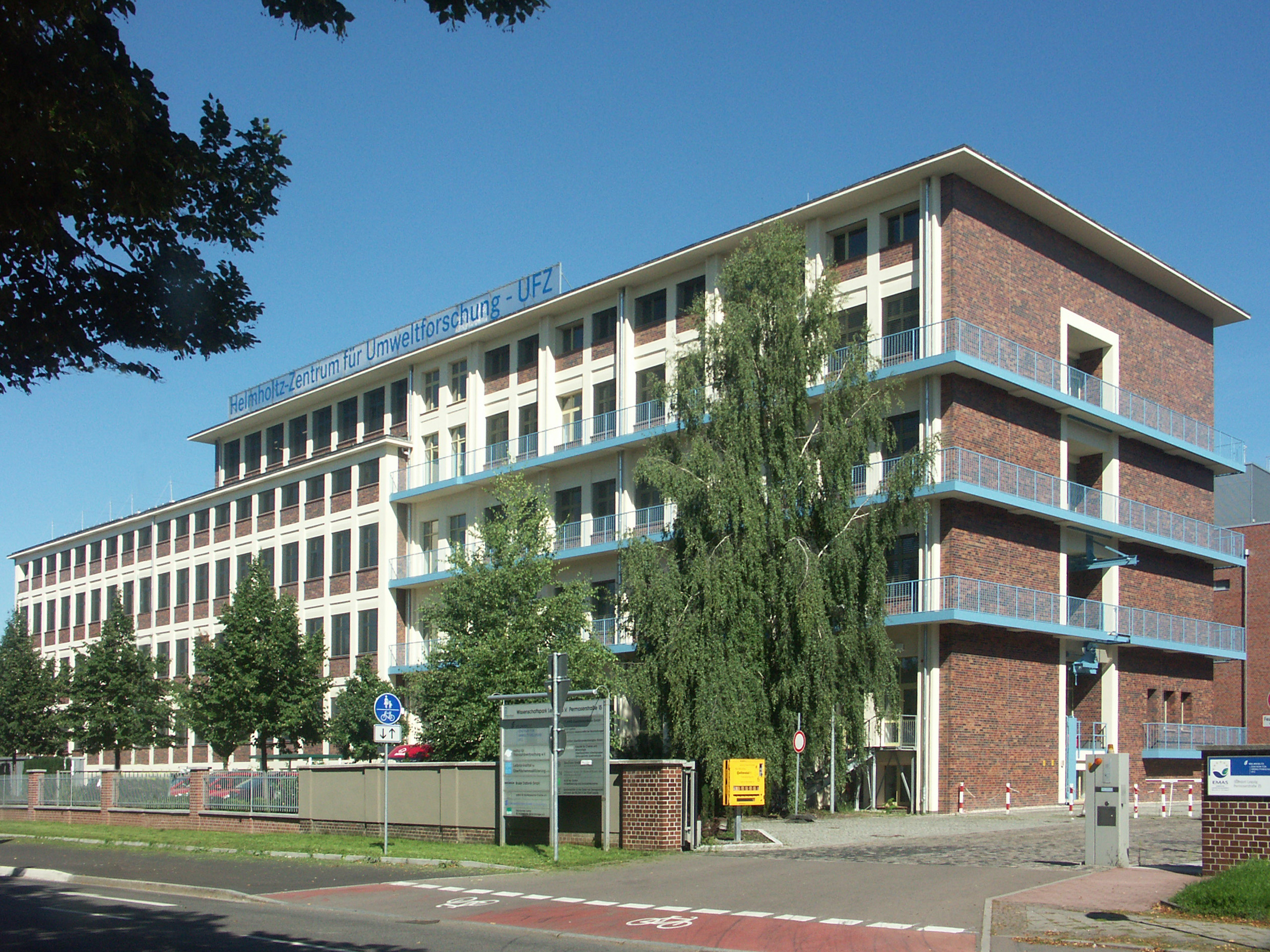
One of the buildings of the UFZ (2010)

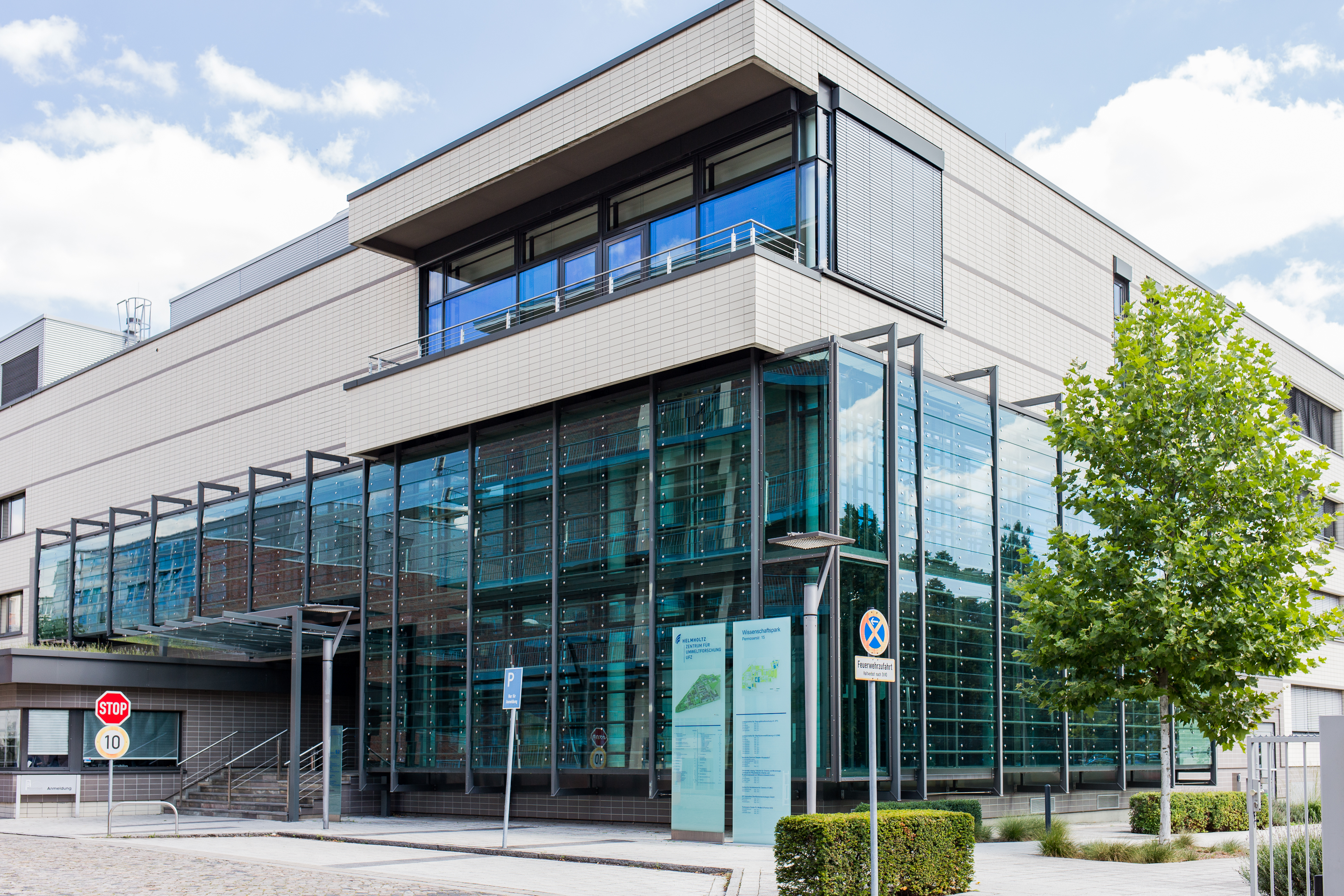
Conference Center Leipzig KUBUS, including the conference venue of WikiCon 2017

The institutes and companies operating on the site are:

- Helmholtz Centre for Environmental Research - UFZ
- Leibniz Institute of Surface Engineering - IOM
- Leibniz Institute for Tropospheric Research - TROPOS
- Leipzig University Institute for Non-Classical Chemistry - INC
- Leipzig Research Centre of the Helmholtz-Zentrum Dresden-Rossendorf
- Saxon Institute for Applied Biotechnology - SIAB
- University of Leipzig, Plant Physiology Group
- Bruker
- IOT Innovative Oberflächentechnologien GmbH
- OPTEG GmbH
- Technoserv-Center Dr. Modes & Partner OHG
- German Biomass Research Centre - DBFZ

With 1,259 employees (as of December 2024) at its Leipzig site, the UFZ is by far the largest of the institutions represented. It occupies over ten buildings in the western part of the site. In 2025, there are 7 scientific institutions with 1650 employees in the Wissenschaftspark.

== History ==
At the beginning of the 20th century, the metalworking company Hugo Schneider AG (HASAG) relocated its plant from Paunsdorf to a triangle between Torgauer Strasse, Permoserstrasse and the railway tracks as a new modern plant. As early as the First World War, production was switched to armaments, and by the 1940s the largest armaments factory in Saxony had been established. The Panzerfaust was developed here from 1942 onwards. South of Permoserstrasse, a subcamp of the Buchenwald concentration camp was built for forced laborers in the course of the Second World War. A memorial on the grounds of the Wissenschaftspark commemorates this.

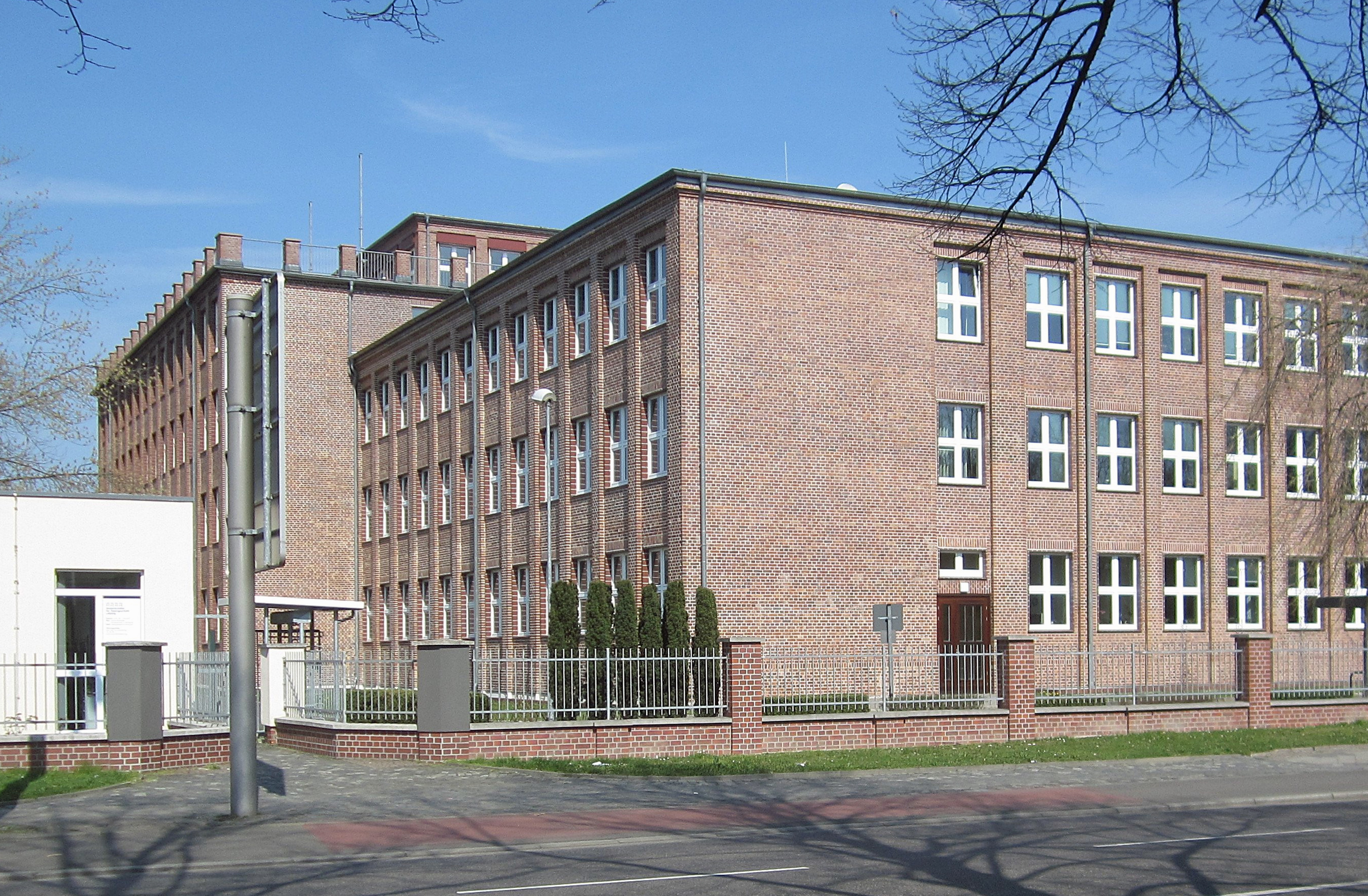
Former HASAG administration building, today including the UFZ library, on the left the forced laborer memorial (2017)

After the war, a research site was established on the HASAG site after the demolition of the factory facilities. Initially, the Institute of Organic Chemical Industry (later Institute of Process Engineering of Organic Chemistry) and the Institute of Chemistry and Technology of Plastics (later Institute of Plast Research) were housed in the administration building, which was reconstructed after war damage. This was followed by the Institute for Applied Radioactivity (IaR) and the Institue for Physical Separation (the latter later renamed the Institute for Stable Isotopes (IsI)), for which new buildings were built. The approximately 40 metres (130 feet) tall tower for the isotope separation columns still dominates the image of the site from afar. A social building and a technical centre were built. In 1958, the institutes were subordinated to the newly founded Research Association of the German Academy of Sciences at Berlin (DAW). In 1969, the Institute of Technical Chemistry (from 1985 Institute of Biotechnology (IBT)) was established, and in 1969, in the course of the academy reform, the IaR and the IsI were merged with two other institutions to form the Central Institute for Isotope and Radiation Research (ZfI). In the next few years, some smaller facilities and new buildings were added.

In the course of German reunification in 1991, all institutes were closed except for a few small work units. At that time, 1740 employees were employed on the site, 469 of them in the ZfI.

On 2 January 1992, the Environmental Research Center - UFZ and the Institute for Tropospheric Research began operations. The UFZ took over most of the existing buildings. The Institute of Surface Engineering was founded at the same time from ZfI work units in the field of ion and electron beam research. Some affiliated institutes of the Leipzig university began their work.

In the following years, all buildings were reconstructed and new ones were built, such as the institute building and the cloud laboratory of TROPOS, the institute building of the IOM, a laboratory building for the UFZ, the company building of Bruker and the Leipzig KUBUS, the conference and education center of the UFZ.

The association Wissenschaftspark Leipzig/Permoserstraße e. V. was founded in 1998 with the goals of promoting technology transfer between members and industry, creating information structures and using existing research resources, holding joint scientific events as well as further education and training measures, developing the infrastructure on the site and presenting it to the public.

== See also ==
- List of tallest buildings in Leipzig, the column tower in the Wissenschaftspark
- Justus Mühlenpfordt

== Bibliography ==
- UFZ-Umweltforschungszentrum Leipzig-Halle GmbH, ed. (2001). Leipzig Permoserstraße. Zur Geschichte eines Industrie- und Wissenschaftsstandortes [Leipzig Permoserstrasse. On the history of an industry and science site] (in German). Leipzig: Passage-Verlag. ISBN 3-932900-61-8.
