= Ivan Georgiev Petrov =

Bulgarian-American physicist

- Иван Георгиев Петров
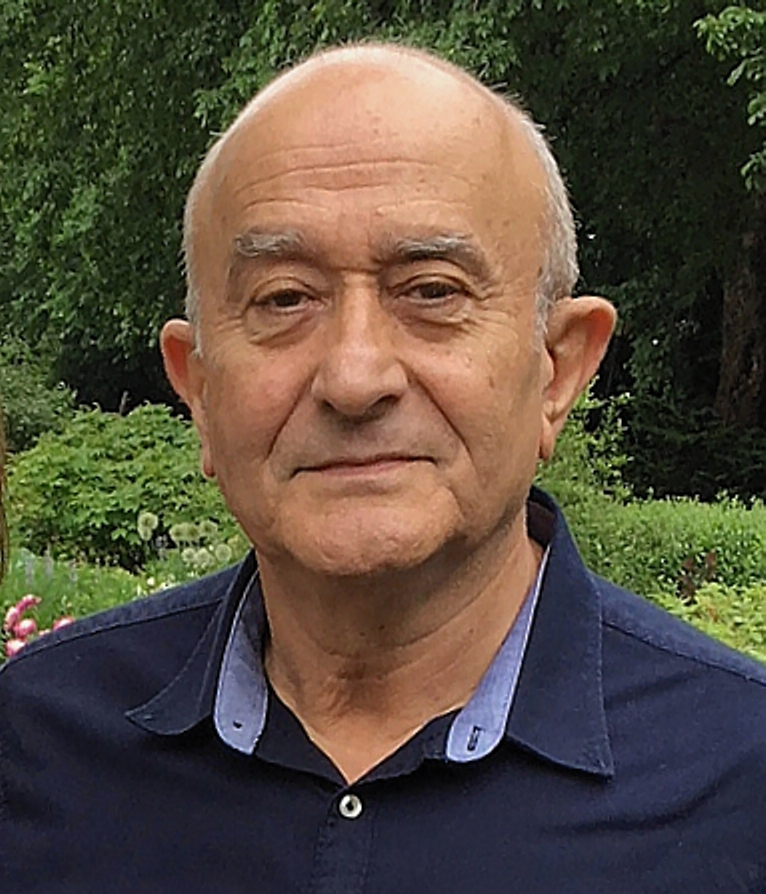
- Petrov in 2020
- Born: 6 September 1949 (age 76); Shumen, Bulgaria
- Citizenship: United States
- Education: Sofia University; Bulgarian Academy of Sciences
- Known for: High-power impulse magnetron sputtering
- Scientific career
- Fields: Physics; Materials science
- Workplaces: University of Illinois at Urbana–Champaign; Linköping University

Ivan Georgiev Petrov (Bulgarian: Иван Георгиев Петров; born 6 September 1949) is a Bulgarian-American physicist specializing in thin films, surface science, and methods of characterization of materials. His research and scientific contributions have been described as having an "enormous impact on the hard-coatings community". Petrov was the president of the American Vacuum Society for 2015.

== Biography ==
Ivan Petrov was born in 1949 in Shumen, Bulgaria. For high school, he attended the English Language School Geo Milev in Ruse, graduating in 1968. He studied physics at Sofia University where he earned a MSc in 1974. He earned his PhD in physics from the Institute of Electronics at the Bulgarian Academy of Sciences in 1986, after which he became an associate professor until 1989.

In 1989, he moved to the University of Illinois at Urbana–Champaign in collaboration with professor J. E. Greene, serving initially as a visiting professor. From 1998 until 2010, he was an adjunct professor in the department of materials science and engineering, simultaneously serving as the director of the Center for Microanalysis of Materials at the Seitz Materials Research Laboratory (MRL). From 1998 to the present, he is a principal research scientist at the MRL.

Between 2000 and 2012, Petrov was an honorary visiting professor of Surface Engineering at the Materials and Engineering Research Institute of Sheffield Hallam University in England. Since 2010 he is an adjunct professor in the department of physics, chemistry and biology (IFM) at Linköping University in Sweden, where he was awarded an honoris causa degree in 2009.

He was elected chair of the surface engineering division of the International Union for Vacuum Science, Technique and Applications, serving terms from 2007 to 2022.

In 2014, he was elected as president of the American Vacuum Society for 2015.

== Research ==
Petrov's research elucidated the ways to obtain high-quality thin films, at low substrate temperatures, from refractory materials, such as transition metal nitrides, through the use of high-fluxes of low-energy ions.

He co-authored the seminal papers on High-power impulse magnetron sputtering (HIPIMS) which demonstrated that this technique produces highly ionized metal fluxes and opened additional ways to manipulate films properties.

Petrov was one of the principal investigators of the Transmission Electron Aberration-Corrected Microscope (TEAM) project from 2000 to 2009.

He is an author on over 300 publications, which have been cited more than 22,000 times by other scholars.

== Awards and honors ==
- 1996: Sustained Excellence in Research Award (U.S. Department of Energy)
- 2001: Named as a Fellow of the American Vacuum Society (AVS)
- 2009: R&D100 Award by R&D Magazine as a co-inventor of the TEAM electron microscopy stage
- 2009: Bunshah Award and Honorary Lecture from AVS for "development of a detailed understanding of the role of low-energy ion-irradiation on microstructural and texture evolution during transition metal nitride layer growth"
- 2013: John A. Thornton Memorial Award and honorary lecture from AVS for "seminal contributions in determining the role of low-energy ion/surface interactions for controlling microstructure evolution during low-temperature growth of transition-metal nitride layers"
- 2014: the journal Surface & Coatings Technology dedicated a special issue to Petrov, recognizing him as "a true pioneer in the science and technology of hard coatings" and that "his papers have been, and still are, must-reads for both newcomers to the field and experienced colleagues"
- 2014: Academician Emil Djakov Award from the Institute of Electronics, Bulgarian Academy of Sciences for Petrov's "prolific research in the field of radiophysics, physical and quantum electronics and his contribution to raising the prestige and development of international cooperation of the Institute of Electronics at the Bulgarian Academy of Sciences"
- 2017: Lifetime Achievement Award and honorary lecture from the Taiwan Association for Coatings and Thin Film Technology
- 2019: Lifetime AVS Honorary Membership

== Personal life ==
Ivan Petrov is the son of Georgi Petrov, a Bulgarian agronomy professor, and Russanka Petrova. He is married to Vania Petrova, and they have a son Georgi.
