= Fliegerfaust =

Fliegerfaust/Luftfaust
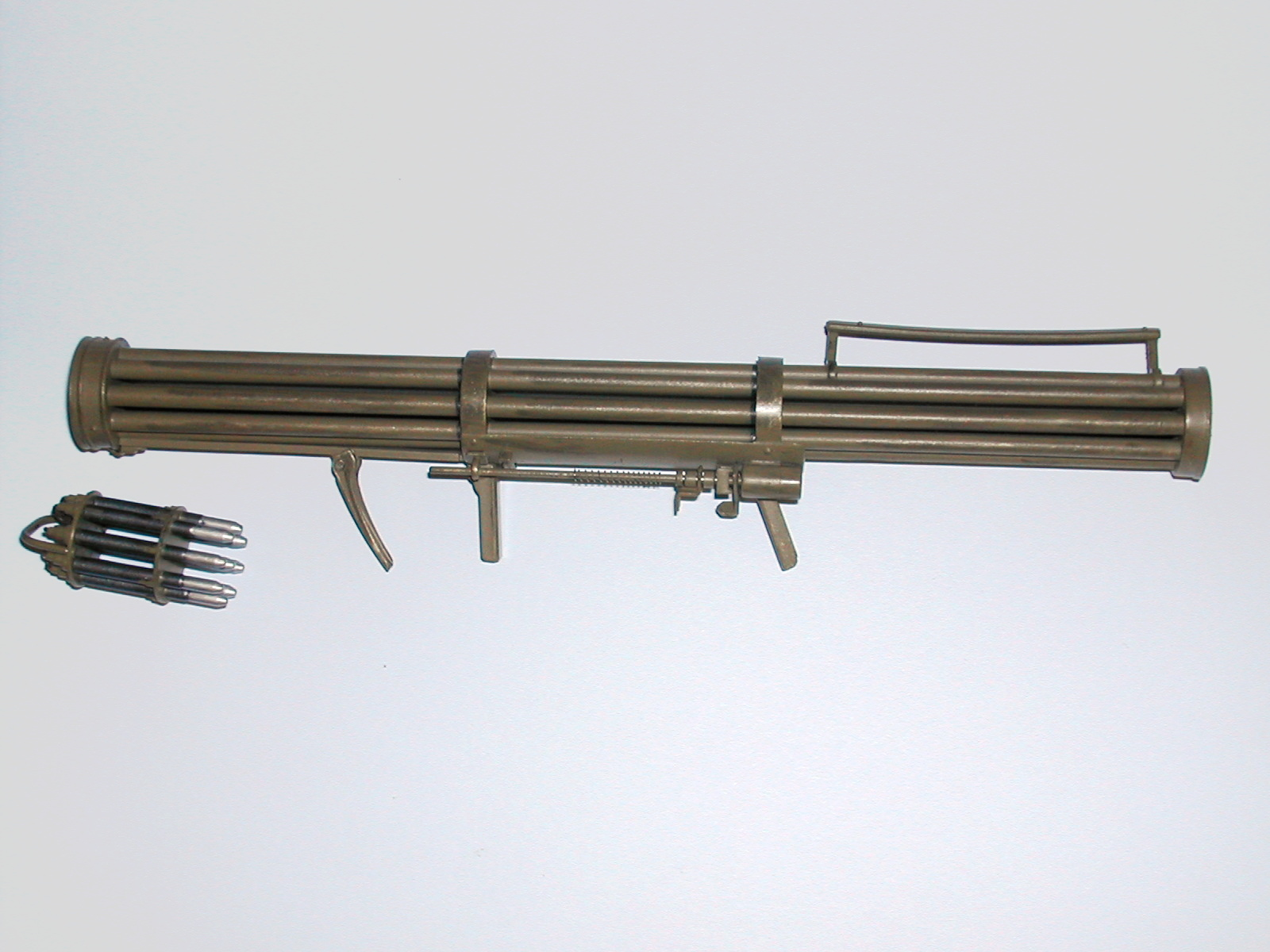
- A replica Fliegerfaust B
- Type: Surface-to-air unguided missile system
- Place of origin: Nazi Germany

Service history
- In service: 1945
- Wars: World War II

Production history
- Manufacturer: HASAG
- Produced: 1945
- No. built: Only a few produced.
- Variants: Fliegerfaust A, Fliegerfaust B

Specifications (Fliegerfaust B)
- Mass: 6.5 kg (14 lb 5 oz) loaded
- Length: 150 cm (4 ft 11 in)
- Width: roughly 10 cm to 15 cm
- Cartridge: standard 20 mm shells fitted with rocket engines
- Cartridge weight: 90 grams
- Caliber: 20 mm
- Barrels: 9
- Action: volley-fire rocket system
- Rate of fire: theoretical cycle rate of 1,000 to 1,000+ rounds per minute
- Muzzle velocity: 350 m/s
- Effective firing range: 150 to 300 metres
- Maximum firing range: 500 metres
- Feed system: 9-round loaders
- Sights: simple iron sight

The Fliegerfaust (lit. "pilot fist","plane fist", or "aviator fist"), also known as the "Luftfaust" (lit. "air fist"), was a German prototype of a man-portable, multi-barreled, unguided rocket launcher, designed to destroy enemy ground attack planes.

Ordered into production in the last year of World War II, only a few were made and used before the end of the war in Europe.

== Design and development ==
Designed by Hugo Schneider AG (HASAG) of Leipzig in 1944, the Luftfaust was produced in two different versions.

The first version, which has been called Luftfaust A, had four one-metre long 20mm barrels stacked one on top of another. These fired 20mm calibre projectiles (weighing 90g and containing 19g of explosive) which were standard 20 mm Minengeschoss as used in German aircraft cannons, propelled by a small rocket and stabilised with fins. These were disposable weapons.

The second version, the Luftfaust B, renamed to Fliegerfaust in February 1945, increased the number of barrels to nine arranged in a circle, and increased the barrels' length. The total length was 150cm and it weighed 6.5 kg loaded. The firing sequence was four rounds from every other barrel followed by the remaining five after a 0.1 second delay. The delay was meant to prevent the projectiles from getting damaged by the previous launches' exhaust fumes, which could also interfere with their courses. Some sources, however, state that the barrels were fired individually with a delay of 2 seconds between each ignition.

The Fliegerfaust rocket projectiles were spin stabilized; some of the rocket exhaust was directed out through four small angled holes drilled around the exhaust, causing it to rotate.

A six barrel 30 mm prototype was also constructed.

== Combat use ==
The Fliegerfaust was not a successful weapon because of its small effective range. The dispersion of its projectiles - up to 20% of the range - proved to be too large, and the expected range of 500 m (1,600 ft) was never attained.

Although 10,000 launchers and 4 million rockets were ordered in 1945 few were produced. About 80 of these weapons were used in combat trials by a unit based at Saarbrücken in April 1945.

However, a 1945 photograph of the Hotel Adlon, directly opposite the Brandenburg Gate in Berlin, clearly shows at least 3 expended Fliegerfaust B's lying in the rubble.

Examples of the Luftfaust and Fliegerfaust are held Militärhistorische Museum (MHM) Dresden.

== See also ==
- Panzerfaust

== Bibliography ==
- Fitzsimons, Bernard (1978). The Illustrated Encyclopedia of 20th Century Weapons and Warfare. Columbia House. p. 962. ISBN 9780839361756.
- Hogg, Ian (2003). Niemiecka tajna broń podczas drugiej wojny światowej [Germany's secret weapon during the Second World War] (in Polish). Poznań: Zysk i S-ka. ISBN 83-7150-935-9.
- Hogg, Ian (1999). German Secret Weapons of the Second World War. London: Greenhill. ISBN 1-85367-325-0.
