= HASAG =

Former German metal goods manufacturer

Coordinates: 51.352635°N 12.433047°E

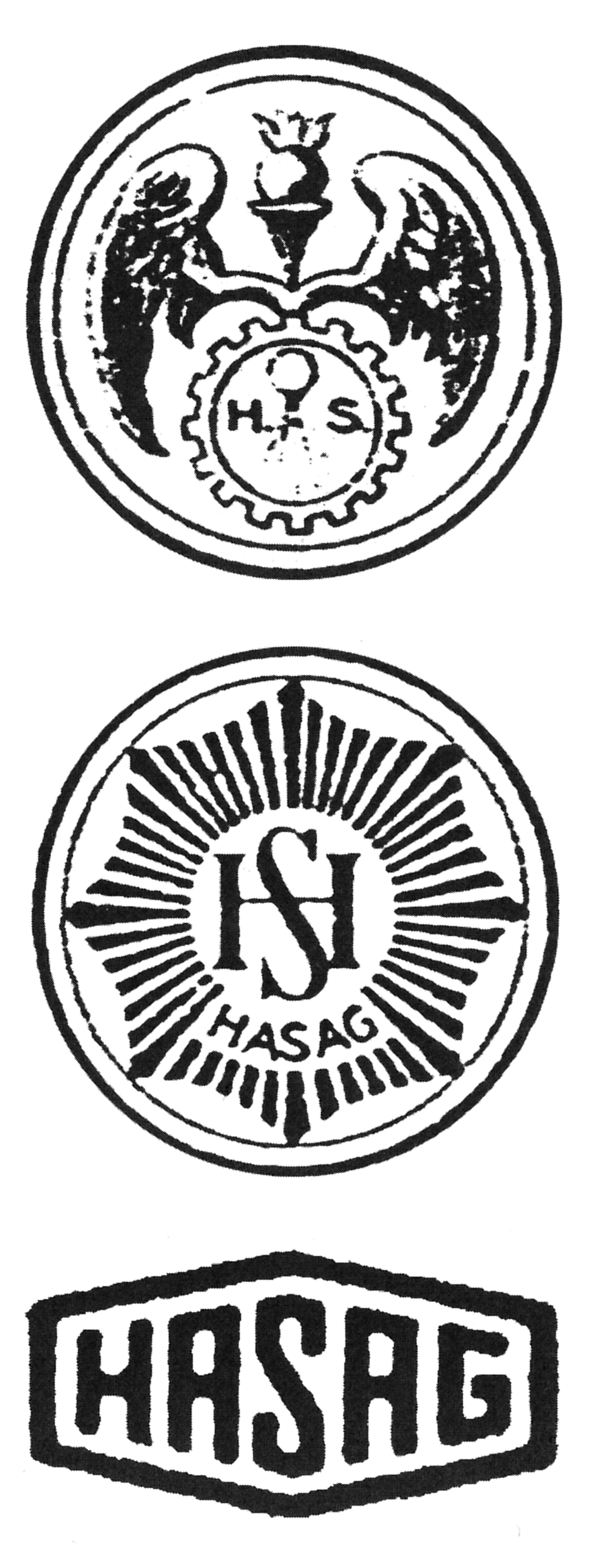

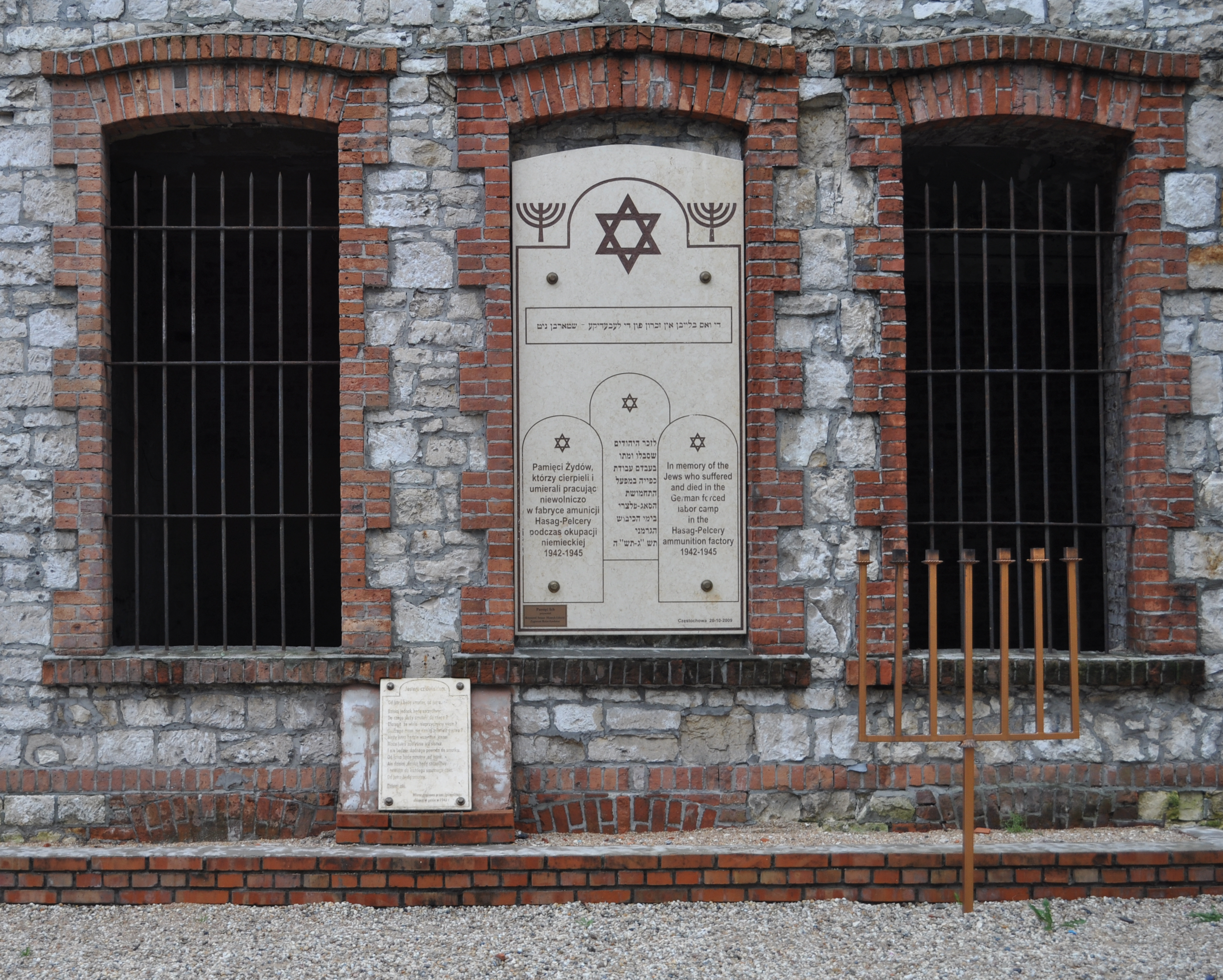
- HASAG plant in Częstochowa, occupied Poland. Nearby plant at Skarżysko-Kamienna had an estimated death toll of 35,000 people before 1945
- Native name: Hugo Schneider AG
- Type: Slave labour
- Industry: Arms manufacturing
- Owners: Joint venture
- Number of employees: 16,581 prisoners of Auschwitz, 5,288 at Schönefeld, 1,902 from Buchenwald, 41,800 from Jewish ghettos in German-occupied Poland as well as at least 13,850 German employees mostly in managerial positions (1942)

HASAG (also known as Hugo Schneider AG, or by its original name in German: Hugo Schneider Aktiengesellschaft Metallwarenfabrik) was a German metal goods manufacturer founded in 1863. Based in Leipzig, it grew from a small business making lamps and other small metal products by hand into a large factory and publicly traded company that sold its wares in several countries. During the Second World War, Hasag became a Nazi arms-manufacturing conglomerate with dozens of factories across German-occupied Europe using slave labour on a massive scale. Tens of thousands of Jews from Poland, and other prisoners, died producing munition for Hasag.

It began making armaments during the First World War, a decision that ultimately increased the company's profitability. The loss of military business after the war resulted in dropping sales. HASAG struggled during the 1920s in the Weimar Republic. As the Nazi Party grew in influence and eventually came to power in 1933, growing militarism led to the company's return to small arms production under the new SS leadership. Following the invasion of Poland at the onset of World War II the company expanded to accommodate thousands of NS-Zwangsarbeiters from concentration camps and ghettos. It was the third largest user of forced labor in Europe, with armaments factories in Germany and Poland. Though HASAG was dismantled after the war, the trademark remained in use until 1974.

== History ==
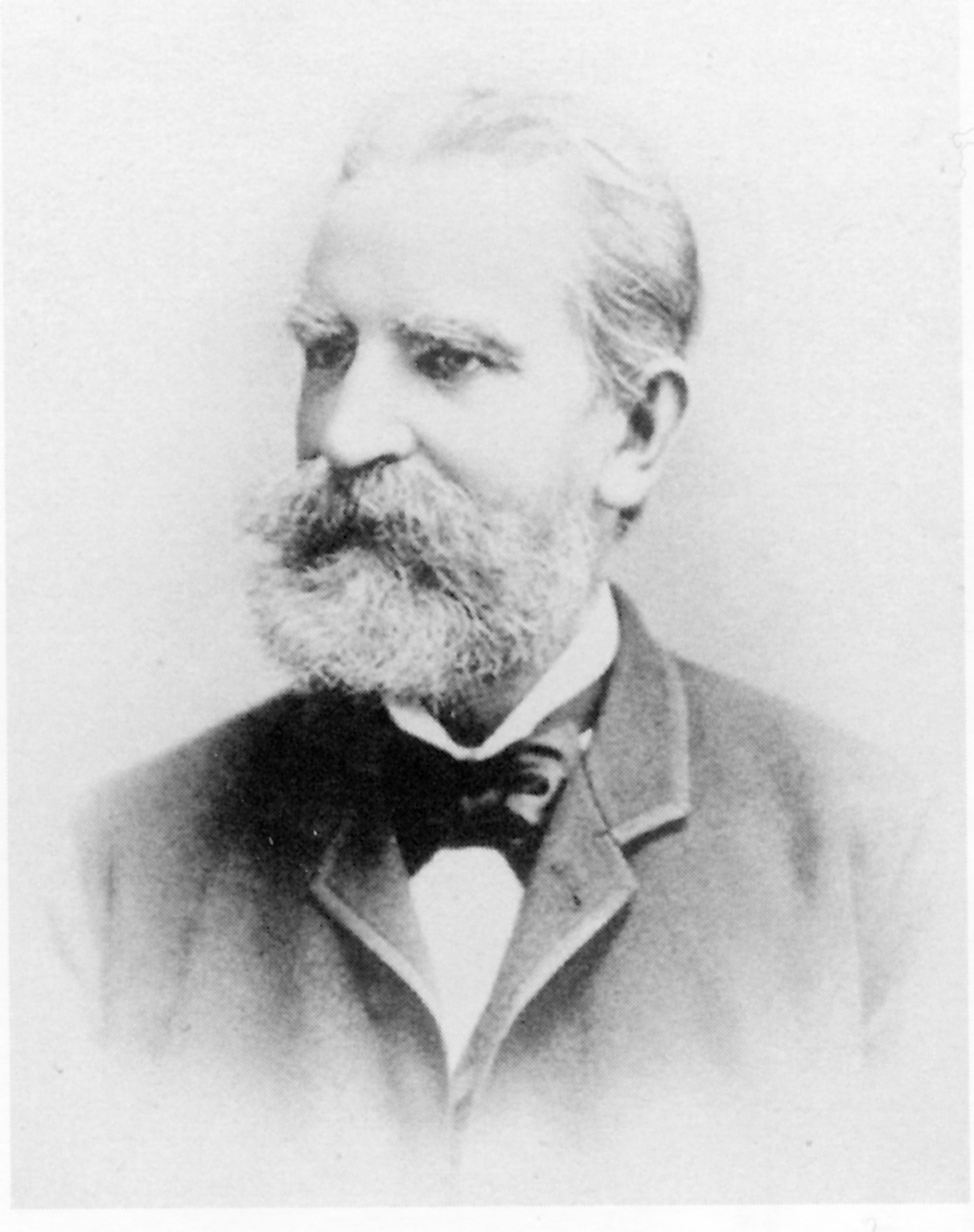
Hugo Schneider, 1888

The company was founded in September 1863 as Häckel und Schneider in Paunsdorf, near Leipzig, with 20 employees who made lamps by hand. Hugo Schneider was a 27-year-old Silesian salesman; his partner, Ernst Häckel, was a plumber, who had started the business making lamps, tinware and painted wares in 1854. Over the next few years, the company began making gas lamps, the production of which soon increased with the growing use of gas lighting. Schneider took over his partner's share of the business in 1871 and by 1880, the firm had grown from a simple factory to an industrial plant, with 200 employees. It soon grew to over 300 employees and began exporting not just to other European countries, but also to South America, Asia and Australia. Schneider died on 1 June 1888, and his son, Johnannes Schneider-Dörfel took over the business.

In 1899, with the involvement of the Darmstädter Bank and other banks, the firm was established as an aktiengesellschaft, manufacturing metal goods under the name "Hugo Schneider AG (Hasag)". Schneider's sons retained 63 percent of the company, but bankers now sat on the board controlling the company. A venture involving other banks resulted in the opening of a factory in Warsaw, Poland. In 1902, in addition to lamps, the company began making portable stoves for heating and cooking, bicycle headlights and brass sheeting and wire. The company grew to 1200 employees and the value of the stock increased several times. By 1913, the company was a major producer of all types of petroleum and gas lamps. The outbreak of World War I briefly interrupted the success of the business, as HASAG lost important foreign markets, but this was soon supplanted by the production of small arms. HASAG's 1914 annual report included the news that in September, the company had, after making some adjustments to its operation, succeeded in obtaining large orders for military supplies, which allowed the company to return to "normal sales revenues". In fact, the company's net profit tripled over its previous non-military sales. The company made rounds and other military items in heavy use on the front.

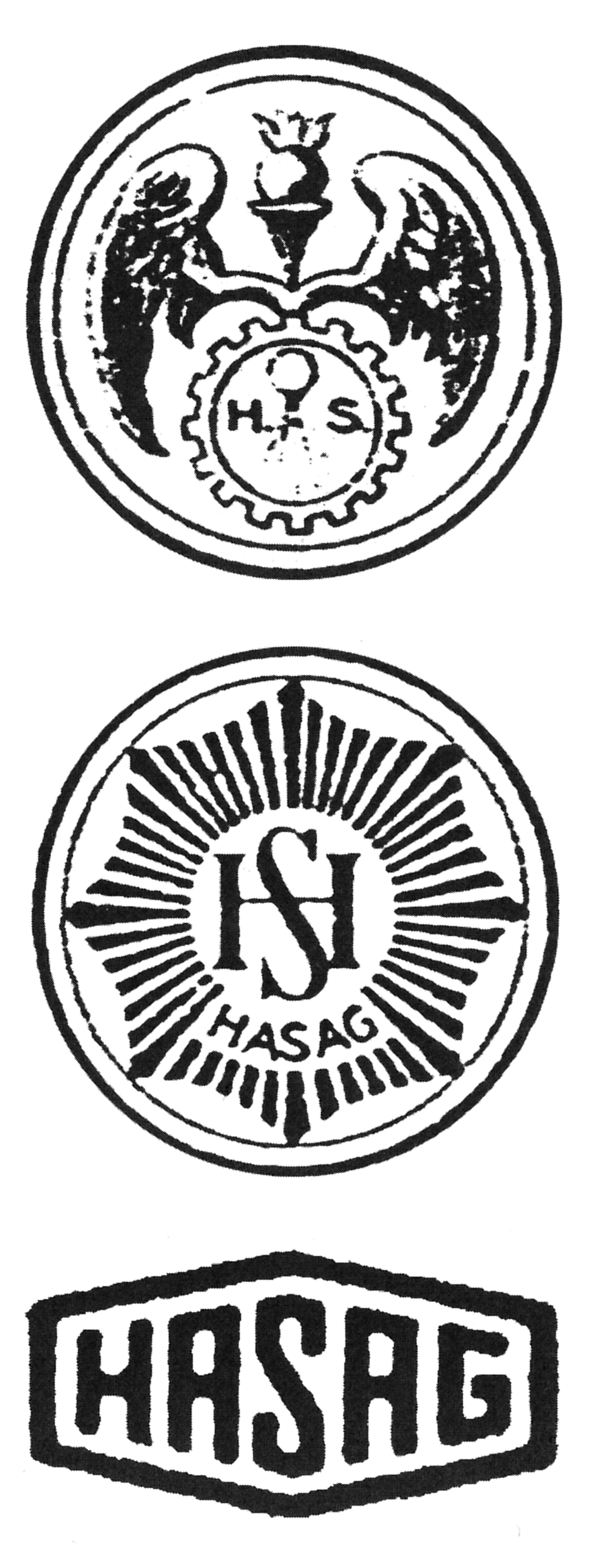
HASAG logos

After the war, the company returned to the manufacture of goods it had produced before the war and added production of vacuum flasks to replace the production of shell casings. Sales dropped to pre-war levels. The worldwide economic crisis and the situation in Germany affected HASAG as well, as workers continually found their remuneration to be inadequate. By 1930, HASAG had 1,000 employees and annual sales of 5 million Reichsmarks, but this was a drop from previous levels. In October 1931, the company reported that sales were down nearly 15 percent and the company's value had dropped by nearly 30 percent. The board sought changes in company management and on October 1, 1931, Paul Budin was brought in.

Budin, an SS-Sturmbannführer and Nazi Party member, was appointed manager of HASAG in 1932. One of his deputies was Dr. Georg Mumme, an SA-Sturmführer. As was common in the Nazi armaments industry, nearly all of the deputies and directors were in the SS, the Gestapo or the SA, most notably Wilhelm Renner, father of Hannelore Kohl, who later became the head of the military business and helped develop the Panzerfaust.

In 1934, with Adolf Hitler and the Nazi Party in control of the government and a growing militarization in Germany, HASAG undertook intensive negotiations with the Reichswehr and again received contracts for ammunition production, having been classified as a military supplier. Production began in autumn 1934. Dresdner Bank and the Allgemeine Deutsche Credit-Anstalt financed the development of the company into an arms manufacturer and the old products became a sideline. In 1935, Budin was promoted to general manager; the main plant in Leipzig was expanded and new factories were built.

The military contracts were very lucrative because they did not have to arrange distribution to a large number of retailers, rather they sold in bulk directly to one customer, the Third Reich. By 1939, HASAG had become one of the biggest arms manufacturers in Germany, with 3,700 employees and annual sales of 22 million Reichsmark. Under Renner's leadership, HASAG remained one of the largest arms manufacturers in central Germany till the end of World War II.

== Use of forced labor ==
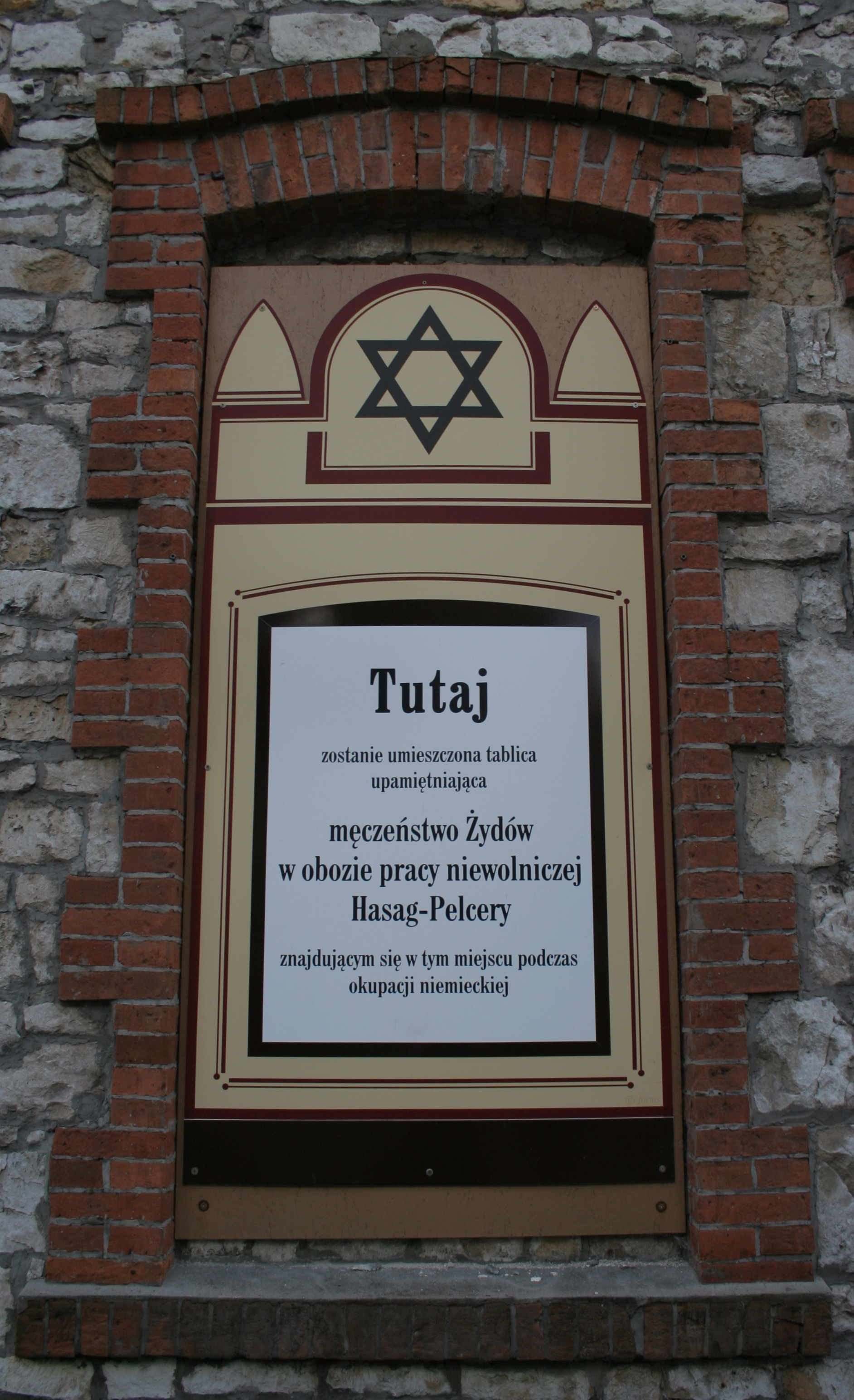
Memorial to Jewish forced laborers at labor camp HASAG-Pelcery in Częstochowa, Poland

Initially, only "elite, especially reliable German workers" were allowed to work in the arms industry, but with the outbreak of World War II in 1939 and many men entering the Wehrmacht and Luftwaffe, workers became harder to find. An agreement was reached between the arms inspector and Friedrich-Wilhelm Krüger, the SS-Obergruppenführer of the General Government, allowing Jews to be used as workers.

During the war, HASAG had factories in eight German cities and three Polish ones. Most of the workers were either forced laborers, primarily from eastern Europe, or prisoners from concentration camps. The forced laborers lived under heavy police surveillance in barracks near the factories. In 1942 and 1943, such labor camps were set up near all six of the factories in Poland. Few workers were there voluntarily and most of those were Germans in managerial positions. At the beginning of 1942, HASAG had 13,850 employees. They began bringing in Polish forced laborers in spring 1944, and in 1945, had eight Außenkommandos, first from Ravensbrück concentration camp and then from Buchenwald, setting up a labor subcamp next to every HASAG factory in Germany. At Birkenau, the mortality rate for an Außenkommando was officially calculated. It was three and a half months. There were 16,581 prisoners in these labor subcamps, including 10,557 women, both Jews and non-Jews and 4,025 Jewish men. The main factory in the Schönefeld quarter of Leipzig had 5,288 forced laborers, of whom, 5,067 were women.

HASAG was able to use women to replace male workers because of automation and their machinery, also the company produced small and medium-sized arms. The company preferred to employ and exploit the prisoner labor available from numerous Nazi labor camps and maintained by the SS, and became the third largest user of forced laborers in Germany. HASAG employed more women than men because the SS charged less for women. They worked more quickly than men and were more adaptable; they also had a lower mortality rate.

In 1944, Reichs Minister for Armaments and Munitions Albert Speer gave HASAG special authority under the title "Hochlauf (run-up, production boost) Panzerfaust", making the company the weapon's sole producer in Germany. This enabled HASAG to expand further. At one labor camp, HASAG Werk Schlieben, also called Schlieben-Berga concentration camp, (Note: German sources use several different terms for the satellite labor camps, sometimes Außenlager literally, "outside camp", sometimes Außenstelle ("outside site" or "post") and sometimes, KZ, short for Konzentrationslager ("concentration camp"). This is in addition to other names, which refer to them as HASAG factories.) 1.5 million Panzerfaust "Gretchen" guns per month were filled with explosives. The average life expectancy of a prisoner sent to work there was two months. In the early hours of October 12, 1944, an explosion occurred that killed 96 prison laborers. The cause of the explosion was never determined, whether it was sabotage, accident or a bomb.

With the Soviet offensive in 1945, the situation in Poland became more dangerous for HASAG's factories. Operations were moved to Germany, establishing a number of smaller operations in different towns around Leipzig with good rail and road connections to the main factory in Leipzig. Labor camps were set up in Colditz, Delitzsch, Flößberg (in Frohburg), Grimma, Golzern and Borsdorf. Exact figures for the number of prison laborers are unknown, however, there were at least 718 prisoners, primarily Hungarian and Polish Jews at the labor camp in Colditz. The factory in Flößberg had at least 1,902 prisoners from Buchenwald and probably from Gross-Rosen concentration camp, as well. As at Colditz, Flößberg's slave laborers were primarily Hungarian and Polish Jews, but one-quarter to one-fifth were political prisoners from various countries in Europe.

In 1945, thousands of prisoners were taken out of HASAG factories in a death march. In April 1945, with the Allies nearing the city, Budin blew up the company's main building and office building in Leipzig. He is assumed to have blown up his family and himself along with them. The company's files were never found and are assumed to have been burned.

=== Life at a HASAG factory labor camp ===
Charles Kotkowsky, a Flößberg labor camp survivor, recalled his arrival there on 28 December 1944. His group was brought in to build an arms factory in the forest. They had to clear the woods and lay railway tracks. The conditions were deplorable. Aside from the gnawing hunger, there were no sanitary facilities or running water for the prisoners, so they could not wash themselves or their clothing and it rained often, making the camp very muddy. Many inmates used their morning ersatz coffee to wash themselves; since it tasted so bad, it was not worth drinking. Following their breakfast of thin coffee, prisoners were forced to perform 12 hours of physically hard labor under the supervision of capricious guards, who vengefully beat them with sticks and screamed at them. Finally, in the evening, came a bowl of thin soup with a small piece of bread. Kotkowsky called the hunger "incomprehensible" and said food was so sparingly distributed, even a kapo was found stealing bread. They slept in cold wooden barracks with straw mattresses or just on bare wood during a winter that was exceptionally cold. Another survivor, Stephen Casey (born István Katona), said there were bodies lying in the mud everywhere around the camp, sometimes for days where they fell.

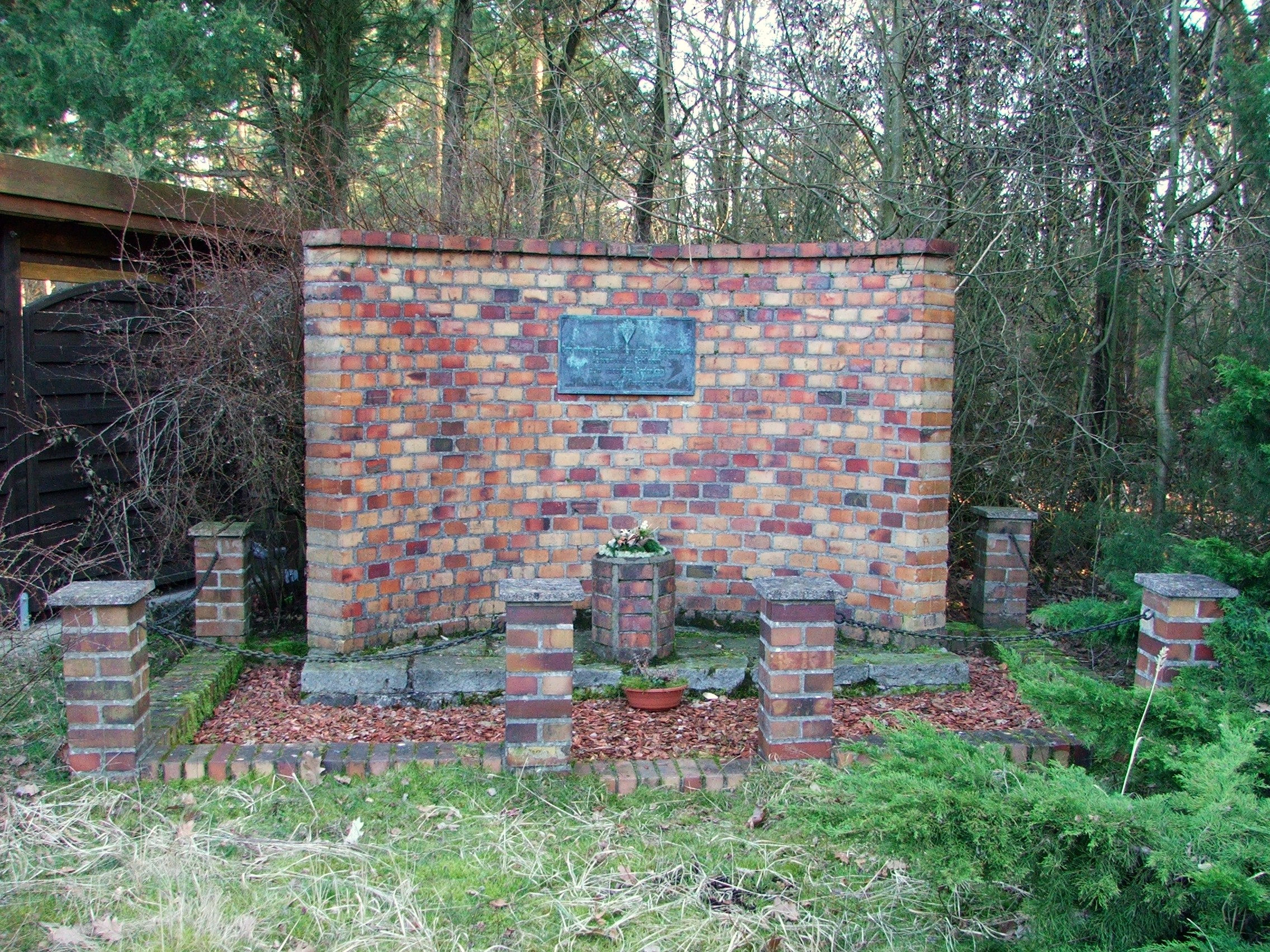
Monument to the victims of HASAG Werk Schlieben-Berga labor camp

Conditions were so bad at Flößberg, that the commandant told the SS to make some improvements, not because of concern for the prisoners' welfare, but because missile production and therefore the war effort would be negatively affected. One of Kotkowsky's friends found the conditions so unbearable, he took the opportunity to be returned to Buchenwald with a transport of prisoners too sick to work, betting his chances of survival against the odds. (Note: Prisoners labeled "sick" were often exterminated before they had a chance to recover and Buchenwald had a high mortality rate. In this case, the gamble paid off, though and the prisoner survived.)

One night, after the factory had been built and gunpowder brought in to begin making weapons, British bombers destroyed the factory in a fifteen-minute bombing raid, after which it rained, filling bomb craters with muddy water. No barracks were hit, which infuriated the SS, who took it out on the prisoners. A few days later, a transport arrived with Hungarian prisoners, who died soon after from the cold, the starvation and the beatings. Kotkowsky said that "prisoners were always disappearing" and more would simply be brought from other slave labor camps. Within Leipzig and the surrounding towns, more people died at Flößberg than at any other Nazi concentration camp or as a result of Nazi ideology.

In March, the SS decided to give the camp and the prisoners a "spring cleaning".

There were no baths to take care of millions of lice, so we had to undress and stand naked waiting at a wall. After freezing for half an hour, they unleashed several fire hoses on us and not everyone was able to withstand that. Each thrust of water in the cold weather knocked us against the wall. There was no way out. How we survived that ordeal was beyond my understanding.

— Charles Kotkowsky, Remnants: Memoirs of A Survivor

With Allied forces nearing and more and more German troops seen in retreat, the SS evacuated Flößberg labor camp on April 13, 1945. They were packed into cattle cars without food and taken on a circuitous route through Czechoslovakia to Mauthausen concentration camp, where they arrived about two weeks later. Many prisoners died along the way. American forces arrived in the village of Flößberg on April 14, 1945.

== Postwar years ==
After the war, the main factory in Leipzig began to produce cooking pots, milk canisters, lamps and other items until 1947, when the machinery and equipment was dismantled and seized by the Soviet occupation force as war reparations. Most of the buildings were demolished.

After 1949, HASAG's civilian patents were used by Volkseigener Betrieben, the publicly owned industrial enterprises in the former German Democratic Republic (East Germany). The company MEWA (VEB Metallwaren Leipzig) produced a high-powered lantern according to a HASAG design. The VEB Leuchtenbau Leipzig owned the trademarked name "HASAG", and extended it in 1963. The brand was discontinued in 1974.

== Legacy ==
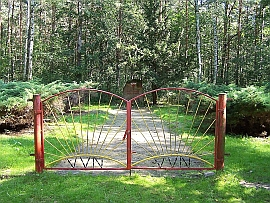
Gate outside the former Flößberg labor camp

The former HASAG Werk Schlieben, also called Schlieben-Berga concentration camp, has an organization devoted to protecting its memory. Tours of the one-time labor camp are given and a number of former prisoners have returned for a visit, even from abroad. There is a memorial plaque at the site and there are plans for a monument.

A new memorial for the 72 Polish and Hungarian Jews who perished at the HASAG Colditz labor camp was unveiled at the Colditz cemetery on 30 March 2007. An earlier memorial to the "Victims of Fascism" was unveiled in 1948 and renovated in 1975, when a red triangle was added to commemorate the political prisoners who died. In 1995, two plaques were added to include honor the memory of forced laborers and prisoners of war, as well. In unveiling the new memorial, the mayor of Colditz, Manfred Heinz, said that each generation must always remind the next of the past, that such events are never repeated. He also said that the memorial was not to be seen as just a reminder of the forced laborers of the past, rather as a rejection of extremism, as well.

The Flößberg labor camp was razed after the war. Today, there is a gate marking the spot, though a local group is trying to raise money to erect a more extensive memorial. There is a prisoner cemetery with 38 prisoner graves on the grounds of the former camp, which the state of Saxony regional administration in Chemnitz had suggested should be moved to Borna. The proposal was opposed by Jewish and other groups and the regional administration backed off in November 2010. Now there are plans to fix up the graveyard and improve other parts of the site.

On the grounds of the Wissenschaftspark Leipzig the Leipzig Nazi Forced Labour Memorial is located adjacent the former HASAG administration building.

== Goods produced ==
- Lighting and heating equipment, camping stoves
- Electrical, home and cooking appliances
- Insulated (thermal) containers
- Enamel and tinned ware
- Automotive lighting and bicycle accessories, electrical headlights and fog lights
- Searchlights, circuit lamps, outdoor lights, stoplights, lanterns, bicycle headlights and tail lights, horns and switches
- Electrical bulbs, gas mantles
- Cast steel, rolled steel and noble metals products

=== Selected weaponry ===
- Disposable, recoilless weapon anti-tank Faustpatrone
- Panzerfaust (shaped charge), recoilless gun
- Fliegerfaust-A, ground-to-air rocket launcher
- Flare Pistol LP 42

== HASAG factories, 1942–1945 ==
The precise number of people forced to work at HASAG factories is unclear because many records were destroyed in the war. The numbers below represent a tally of those known to have worked or perished at the factories below and represent a minimum.

- Leipzig Permoserstraße (main factory)
- Leipzig, northern factory
- Taucha (also called Hasag Werk II)
- Colditz satellite labor camp (1944 – mid-April 1945). 718 known prisoners slave laborers, primarily Hungarian and Polish Jews
- Delitzsch (1944)
- Flößberg labor camp, subcamp of Buchenwald concentration camp (30 November 1944 – 13 April 1945). 1,902 (primarily Jewish) slave laborers, 235 known deaths, of which, 195 are known by name
- Grimma (in 1944)
- Borsdorf (in 1944)
- Altenburg
- Meuselwitz
- Langewiesen, later Dermbach
- Oberweißbach/Eisenach
- Berlin-Köpenick
- Schlieben/Berga, Schlieben concentration camp, third largest of the 136 Buchenwald labor subcamps with between 2,000 and 5,000 female prisoners from Ravensbrück, and Buchenwald
- German factories in Skarżysko-Kamienna with 35,000 dead, Kielce and Częstochowa (1942/1943 to January 1945) using up to 41,800 Jewish forced laborers.
- Partner/co-operative production in Milan and Rome

== Prominent prisoners ==
- Louise Aslanian, French-Armenian writer, poet, French Resistance fighter
- Alena Hájková, Czech Communist resistance fighter and historian

== See also ==
- Industrial plans for Germany
