= English Language School "Geo Milev" (Ruse) =

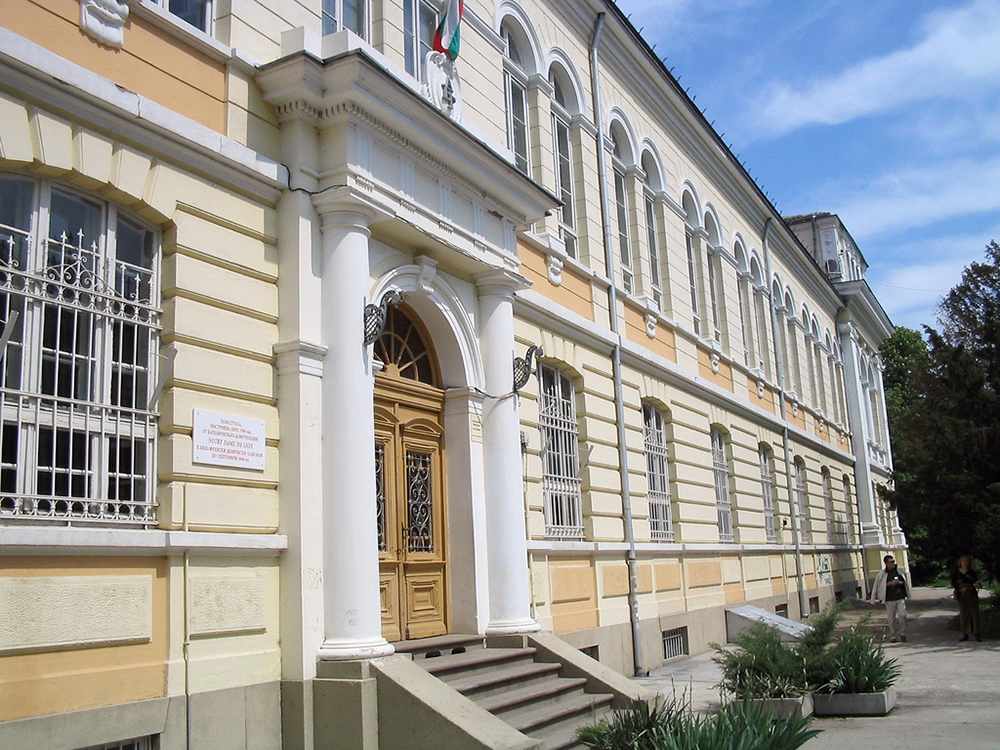

Location
- blvd „Alei Vazrazhdane“ № 3, Ruse
- Coordinates: 43.857778°N 25.965278°E

Information
- Type: Language school
- Patron saint: Geo Milev
- Established: 1963
- Head teacher: Mrs. Margarita Yanakieva
- Website: elsruse.eu

English Language School "Geo Milev" is a state educational institution located in Ruse, Bulgaria providing secondary education with a special emphasis on English studies.

Established in 1963 in a building protected as a cultural heritage of local importance by the Ministry of Culture of Bulgaria, it is among the top prestigious high schools in Ruse and on a national scale.

The school is an accredited member of the UNESCO Associated Schools Project.

== History ==
English Language School "Geo Milev" offers a historical tradition of excellence in preparing young students in foreign language studies since the beginning of the 20th century. The building was constructed in 1908 by the Italian architect professor Mariano Pernigoni for the purposes of the French Catholic School with a boarding house „Notre dame de sion“. The aims of the school, managed by the religious order of Notre Dame de Sion, with divisions in 24 countries around the world, were solid education, proper behavior and forming a character in the spirit of the Christian virtues. Teachers at the French Catholic School were Catholic nuns. The education of the girls was carried out in French and organized into small classes with up to 10 students, but varied in ethnic and multicultural composition – besides wealthy Bulgarians, there were also Jews, Turks, Armenians, Czechs, Austrians, and Belgian students. With the Bulgarian coup d'état of 1944, the country entered the Soviet sphere of influence and the school was closed down until 1963, when it resumed its activities as the nowadays known English Language School "Geo Milev". At present, the high school admits students in 4 classes with intensive studies of English and a second foreign language - French, German or Russian.

== Notable alumni ==
The graduates of ELS „Geo Milev“ enjoy a academic and professional realization.

Notable alumni of the high school are:

- Martin Ivanov Minister of Culture of the Republic of Bulgaria in the Government of Georgi Bliznashki. Currently an advisor of former president Rosen Plevneliev.
- Ivan Georgiev Petrov – Bulgarian-American physicist, specializing in thin films, surface science, and methods of characterization of materials. Past president of the American Vacuum Society.

== Gallery ==
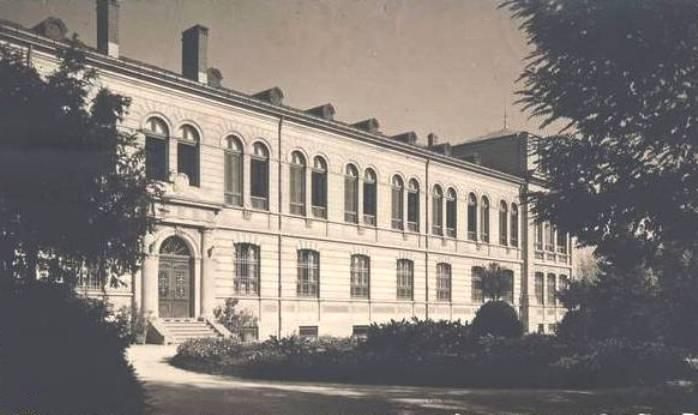
The French boarding school „Notre Dame de Sion“

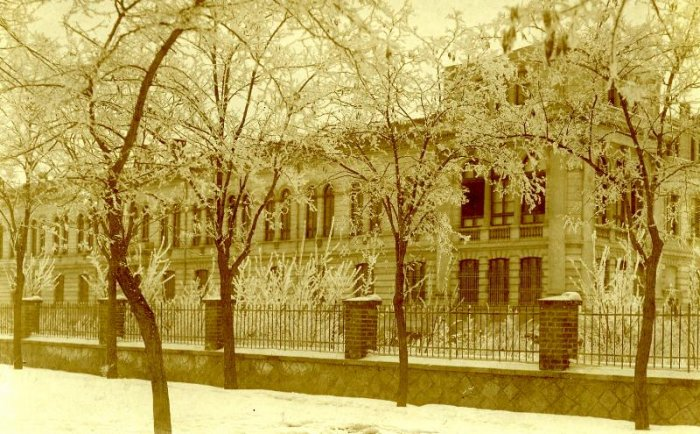
A photo of the now demolished enclosure of the school

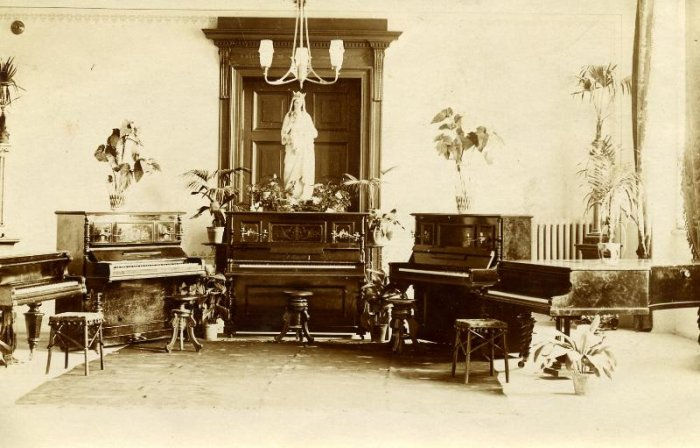
The music hall before 1944

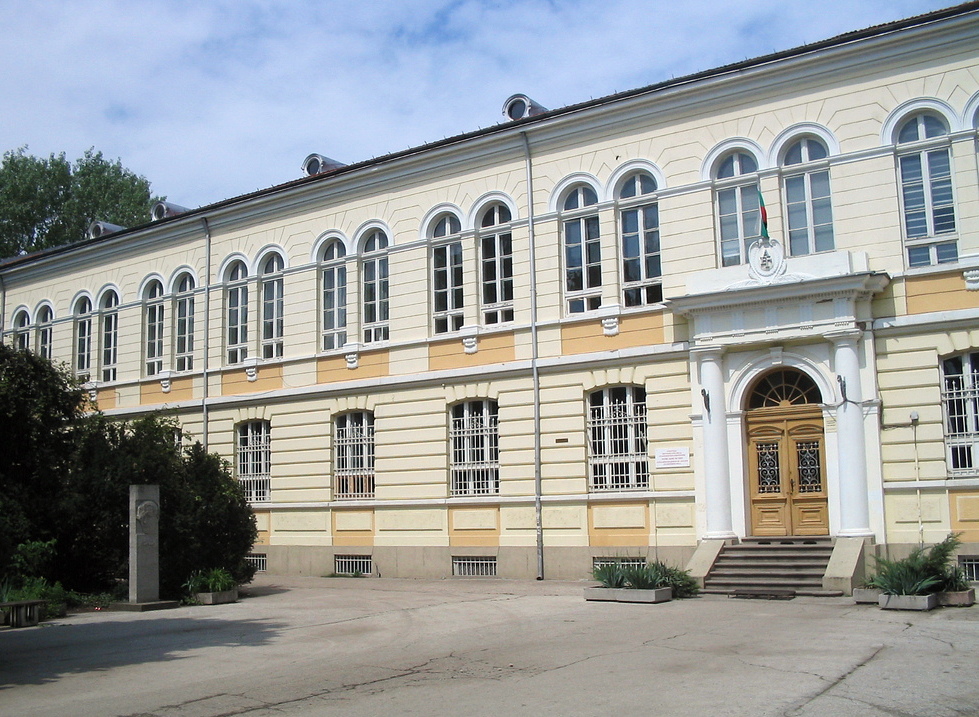
English Language School "Geo Milev" at present

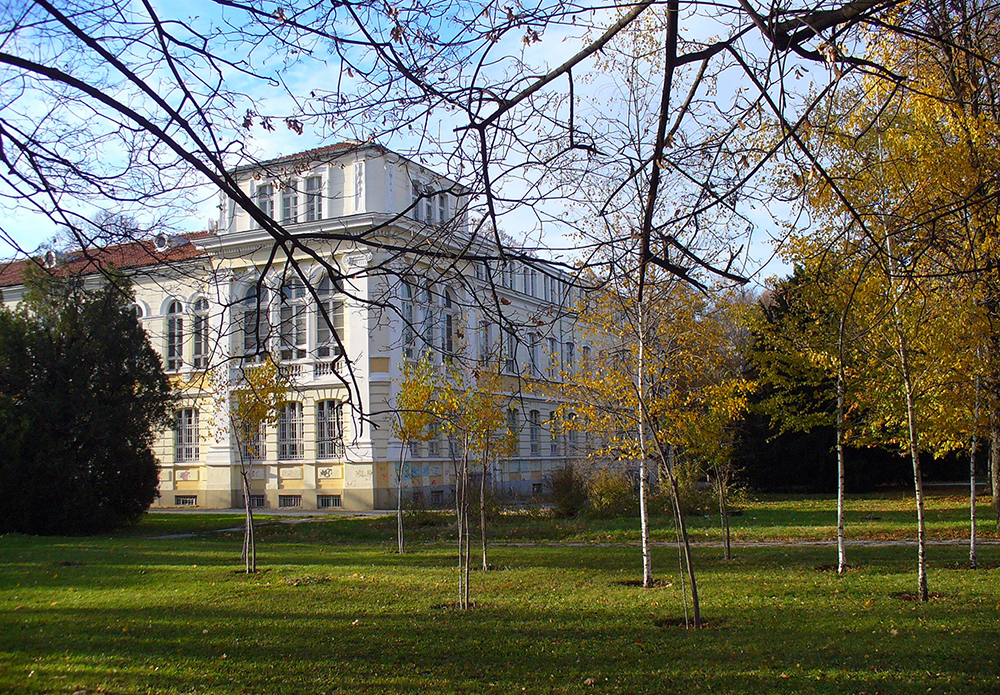
The building is located in Ruse's city park
