= Leibniz Institute of Surface Engineering =

German union of research bodies

Leibniz Institute for Surface Engineering Leipzig
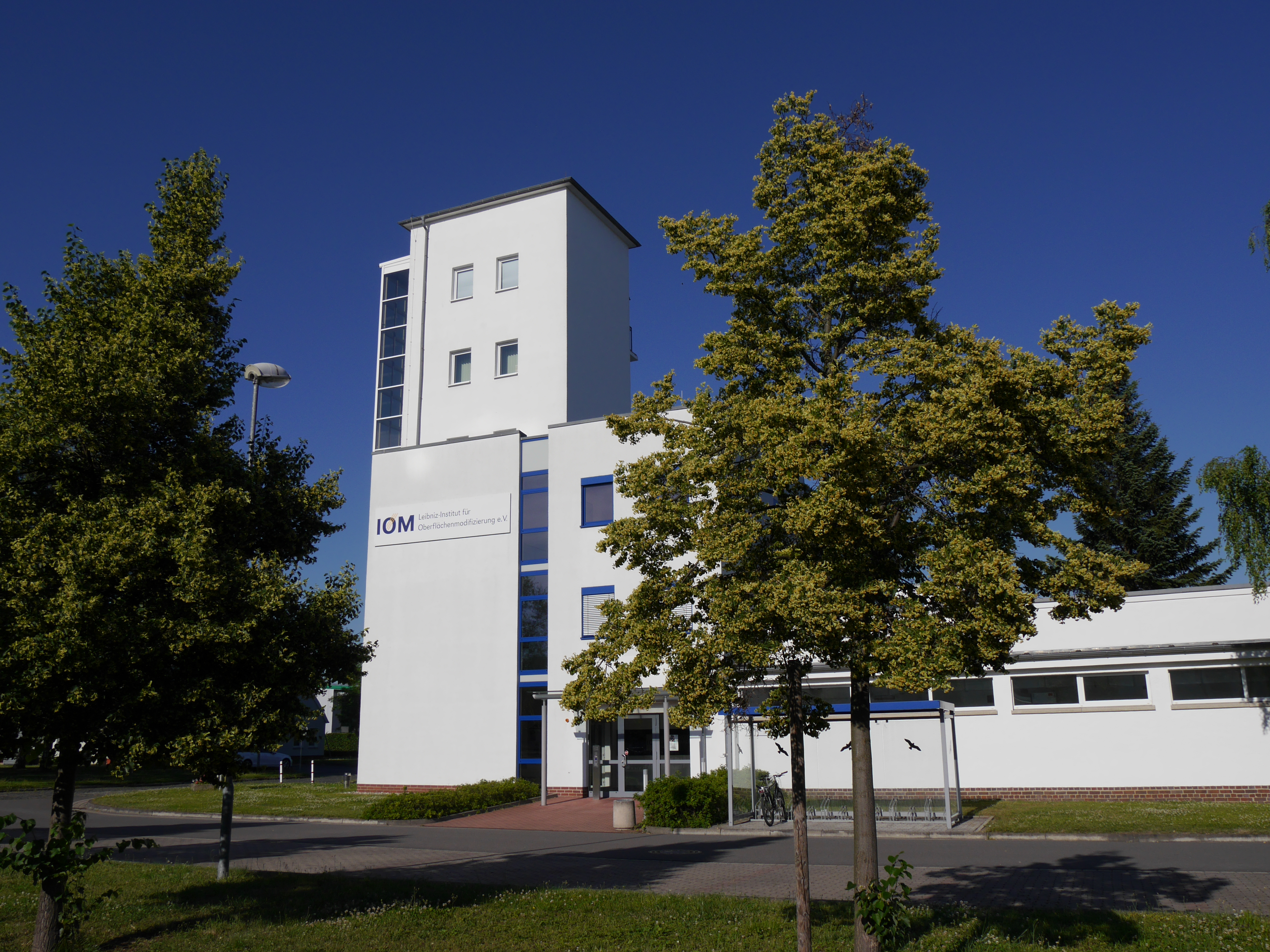
- IOM building (© IOM; Photo: Ronny Woyciechowski)
- Abbreviation: IOM
- Type: Registered association
- Headquarters: Leipzig, Germany
- Fields: Fundamental research
- Members: Leibniz Association
- Director: Prof. Benjamin Dietzek-Ivanšić
- Staff: 150
- Website: www.iom-leipzig.de

The Leibniz Institute of Surface Engineering e.V. (abbreviation: IOM) is a publicly funded research organisation based in Leipzig, Germany. It is a member of the Leibniz Association.

The IOM was founded on the 1.1.1992 with the aim of investigating the fundamental physical and chemical processes in the field of non-thermal material transformation that enable important contributions to surface engineering using ions, electrons, plasmas and photons. The goal is to develop new functional and precise surfaces for future-oriented fields of application. The range of tasks includes research of fundamental phenomena and the transfer of scientific results into industrial applications.

Several spin-off companies have been founded from the IOM and numerous patents and utility models have been granted for developments.

== Structure & financing ==
The IOM is a registered association under the name "Leibniz-Institut für Oberflächenmodifizierung e.V." (Leibniz Institute of Surface Engineering) based in Leipzig, which, according to its statutes, pursues exclusively and directly non-profit and peaceful purposes.

The IOM has four bodies: the General Assembly, the Board of Trustees, the Executive Board and the Scientific Advisory Board. The tasks of the Board of Trustees include all fundamental matters and activities of the IOM as well as advising and monitoring the work of the Executive Board. The duties of the Executive Board are primarily to manage the business of the IOM. The Scientific Advisory Board advises the Board of Trustees and the Executive Board on all scientific and structural issues.

The IOM is financed by grants and donations and is also funded by the federal and state governments in accordance with Article 91b of the German Basic Law. In addition, project funds can be acquired from third parties and used for research purposes.

In total, there were 134 employees at the institute in 2022, of which 75 were academic staff, 34 technical staff, 14 administrative staff and 11 others (scholarship holders, trainees, etc.).

== History ==
=== Predecessor institutes during the GDR period ===
The Institute of Surface Engineering (IOM) emerged from the "Institute for Physical Separation of Materials" founded in 1957 under the direction of Prof Justus Mühlenpfordt. This was later renamed the "Institute for Stable Isotopes" (ISI).

Following a reform of the academy (1968 - 1972), the ISI was dissolved, but became the "Central Institute for Isotope and Radiation Research" (ZfI) and was headed by Prof Klaus Wetzel until 1989 (formally 1990). Both institutes belonged to the Academy of Sciences of the GDR.

As part of the university reform, it was decided that the academies and universities should focus their "research on solving important problems for the development of socialist society, the national economy, the health system, education and culture in the GDR" (§ 2 of the research ordinance). Accordingly, research at the institute was subject to state influences and wishes. For more information on this, see.

The main topics of work at the ZfI were: Accelerator technology, electron beam hardening of thin films, applied radiation chemistry, applied radiation biology, ion beam technology and pulse radiolysis.

=== Founding of the IOM ===
The Institute of Surface Engineering (IOM) was officially founded on 1 January 1992 as a Blue List Institute of the Leibniz Association. The founding director was Prof Frieder Bigl. This was preceded by the dissolution of the ZfI on 31 December 1991 as part of the reorganisation of research institutes following the German reunification.

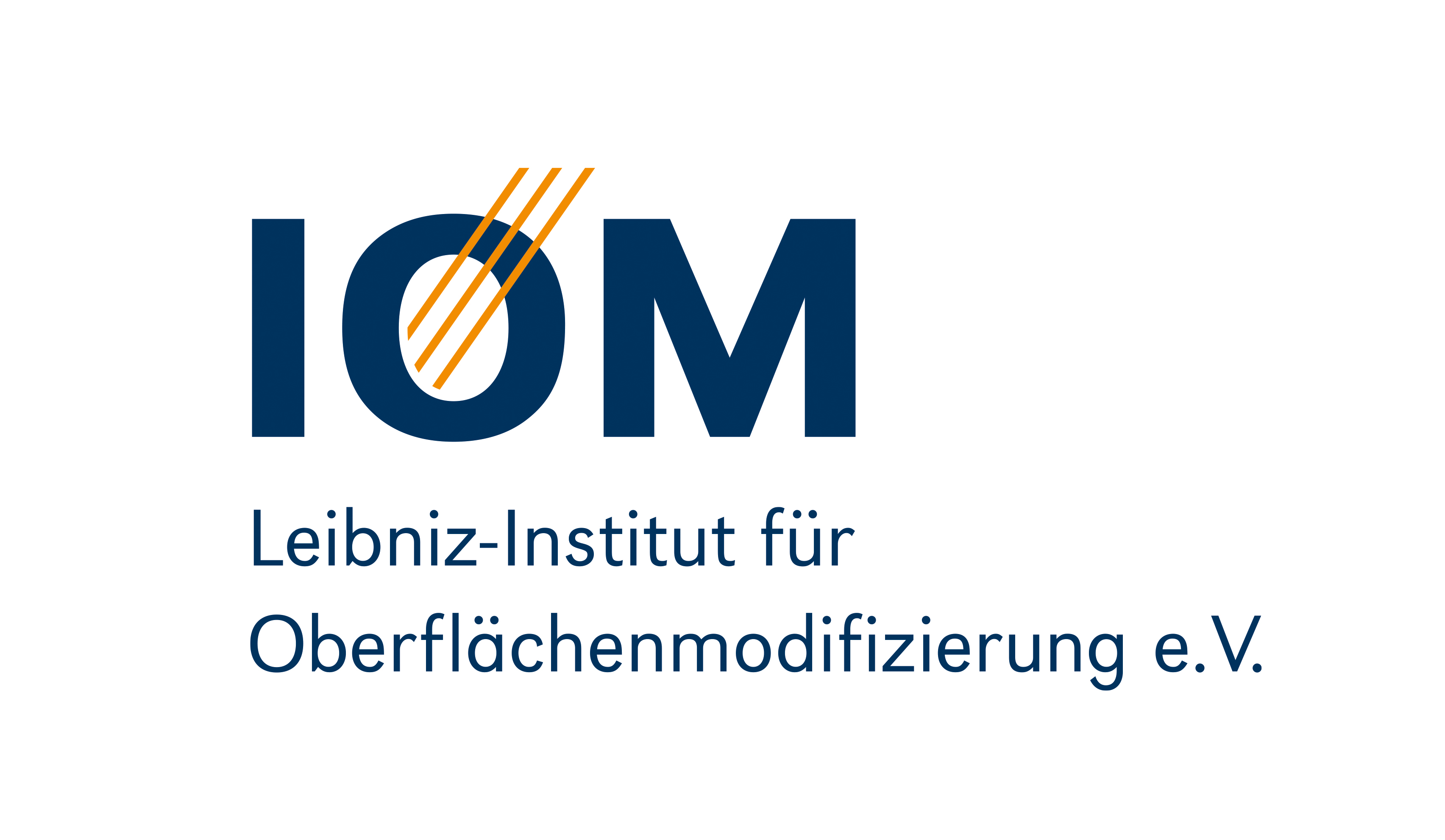
Logo of the IOM

A founding committee chaired by Prof Klaus Bethge was already planning the new foundation in 1991. In this context, it was also decided that the new institute should be called "Institut für Oberflächenmodifizierung e.V." (Leibniz Institute of Surface Engineering) and be a registered association. The status of the institute as a Blue List institute was also decided.

The IOM was divided into two departments: "Ion Beam Technology" headed by Prof Frieder Bigl and "Electron Beam Technology" headed by Prof Reiner Mehnert. Both departments were also divided into working groups and focussed on device development or application-oriented topics. Interdisciplinary cooperation was a clearly formulated goal of both departments from the start.

=== Research between 2000 and 2009 ===
In mid-2000, Prof Bernd Rauschenbach took over the management of the Institute from Prof Frieder Bigl.

The "Ion Beam Technology" department was taken over by Prof Rauschenbach. Under his leadership, research was conducted in various working groups on the topics of fundamentals and new applications, surface precision processing, device technology fundamentals and laser structuring and laser ablation.

The "Electron Beam Technology" department was headed by Prof Mehnert until January 2005, after which Prof Michael Buchmeiser took over this role from January 2006. The individual working groups in this department dealt with the following topics: electron beam technology, accelerator technology, (plasma) polymer modification and process engineering.

In autumn 2001, an additional building was constructed, including a technology hall to house pilot plants, a cleanroom, physical and chemical laboratories and numerous offices for employees. In 2003-04, a laboratory and office extension and a new technology transfer building were started and completed.

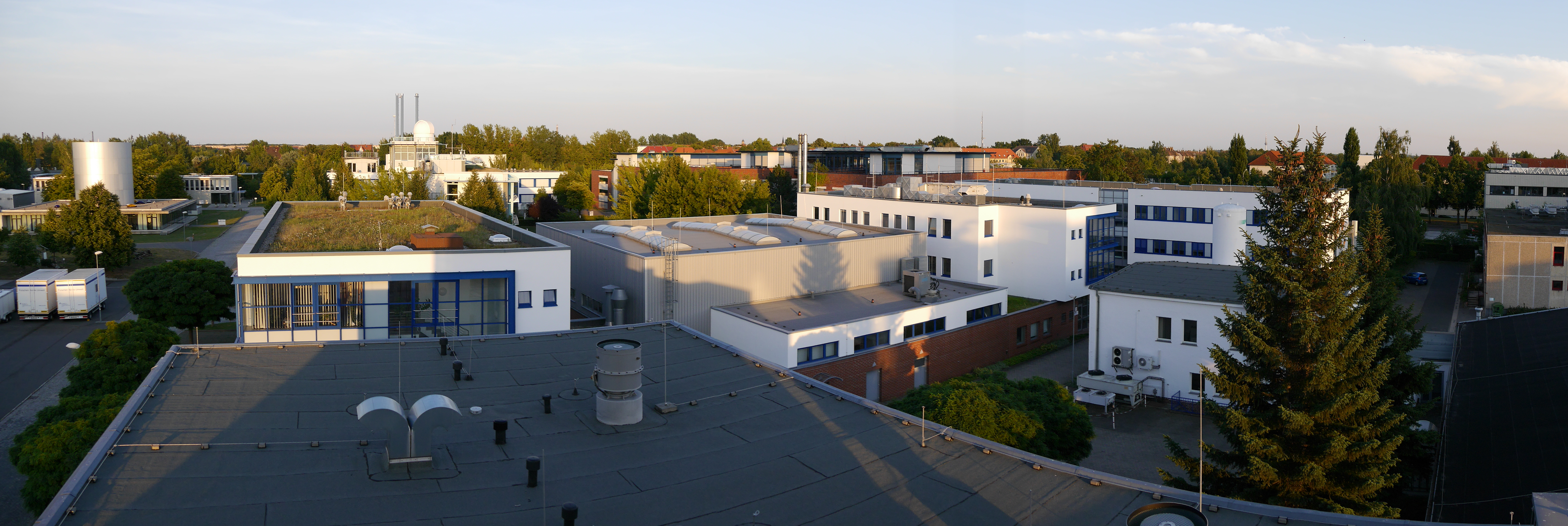

=== Research between 2010 and 2021 ===
In 2010, the institute had around 150 employees. The scientists continued to conduct research in the fields of ion, plasma, electron and photon interaction with surfaces and thin films.

The "Ion Beam Technology" department was renamed the "Physics Department" and headed by Prof Rauschenbach, who remained Director of the Institute. In 2010, there were working groups on the following topics:

· Surface precision processing

· Plasmajet process development

· Device technology basics

· Laser structuring and laser ablation

· Layer deposition and structuring

· Inorganic / organic interfaces and coatings

The "Electron Beam Technology" department was renamed the "Chemistry Department", but remained without a head following the departure of Prof Michael Buchmeiser in 2009. Prof Bernd Abel, who also became Deputy Director of the IOM, took over as head of the department in May 2012. In 2010, there were working groups on the following topics:

· Basic research on polymer layers

· Functional layers

· Polymer modification

· Biofunctional polymers

In May 2012, the Leipzig nanoAnalytical Centre (LenA) was opened to mark the 20th anniversary of the institute. The central instrument of the LenA centre is a high-resolution transmission electron microscope (TEM) model "Titan", which enables material science investigations down to the atomic scale.

In 2015, the "Hertz Application Laboratory" (today: Hertz Electron Beam Laboratory) and the installation of a 10 MeV electron accelerator created an infrastructure that is unique in Germany for basic research in the field of materials science and for industry-related projects on material modification using high-energy electrons (up to 10 MeV).

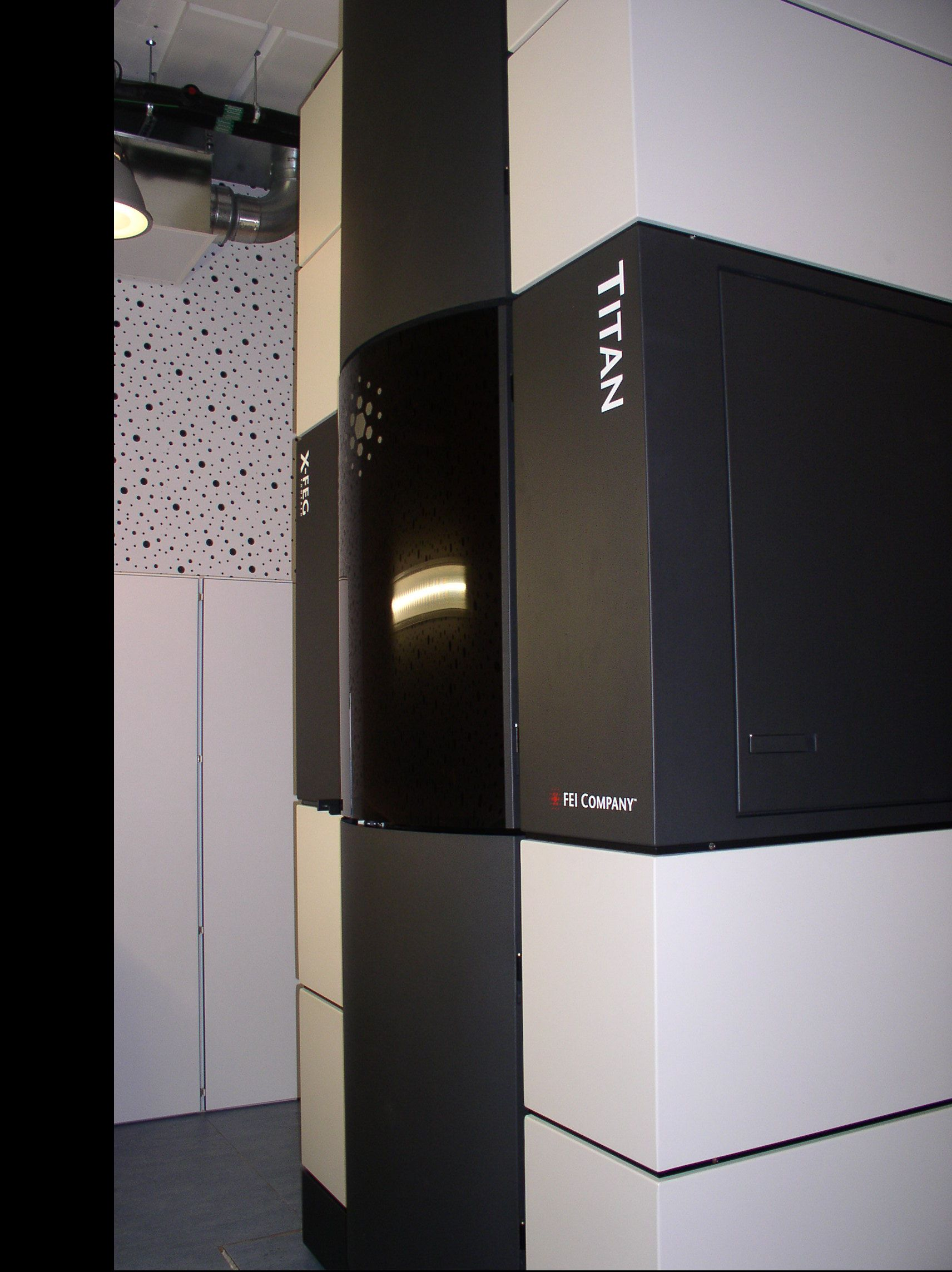
Analytical aberration-corrected transmission electron microscope (TEM) in the Leipzig nanoanalytical centre (LenA). Large-scale device at the IOM. (© IOM; Photo: Yvonne Bohne)

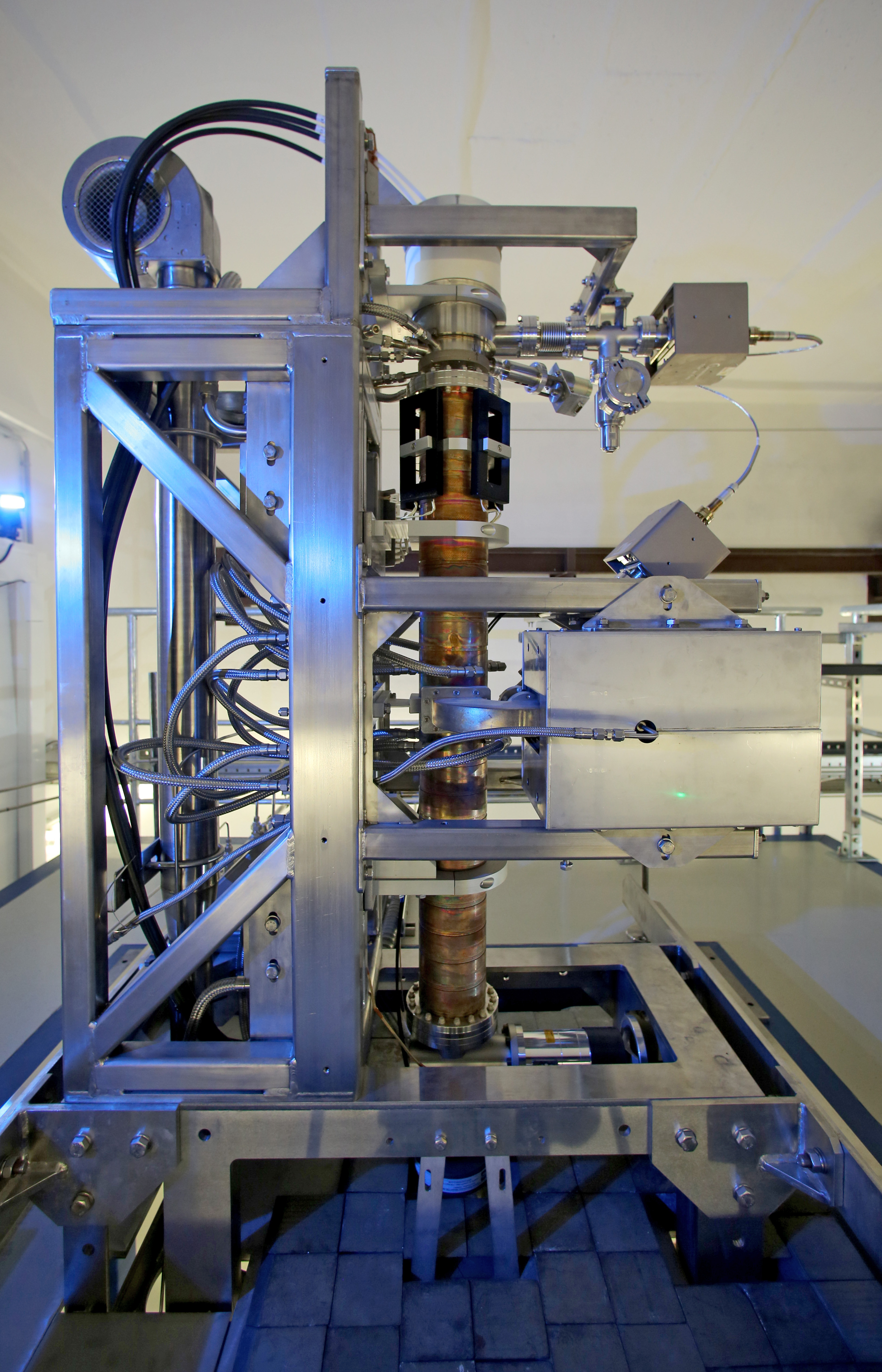
10-MeV electron accelerator (Fa. Mevex, Canada). Large device at the IOM. (© IOM; Photo: Jan Woitas)

The IOM's new application centre (APZ for short) was inaugurated in autumn 2016. The APZ is a technology platform and serves to transfer the technologies developed at the institute to industry. For this purpose, the centre has high-tech facilities such as a coating system for the production of polymer-based multilayer systems, a low-energy electron accelerator for membrane modification, plasma and ion beam processing systems and ion beam-assisted etching of optical components. Two other important pieces of equipment were also purchased in 2016/2017: Firstly, a fine ion beam (FIB) system for sample preparation with a focussed ion beam and secondly, a Raman spectrometer, which can be used to carry out investigations into the structure and bonding of materials.

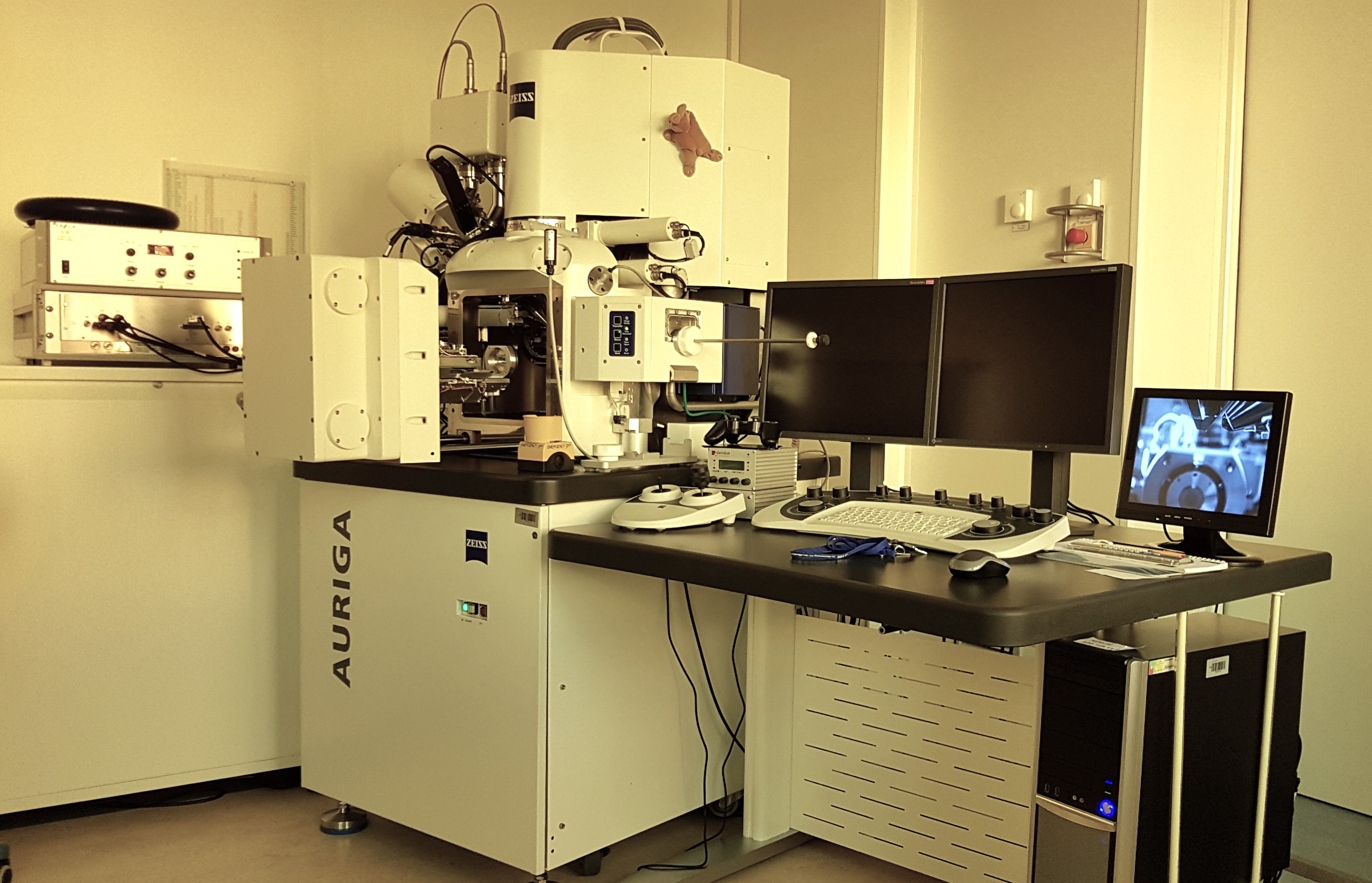
Fine ion beam system (FIB) for sample preparation with focussed ion beam at the IOM. (© IOM; Photo: Agnes Mill)

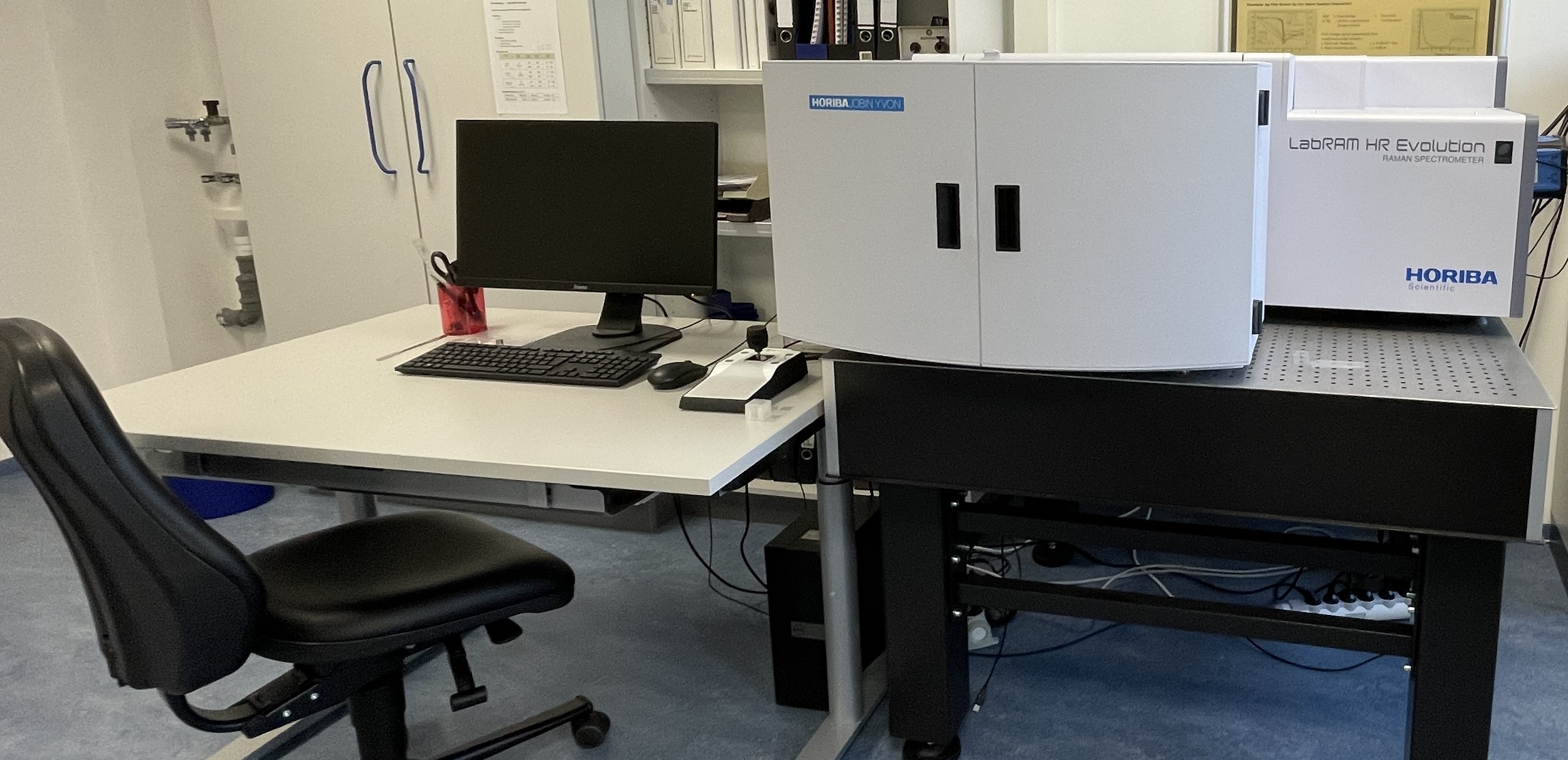
Raman spectrometer for analysing the structure and bonding of materials at the IOM. (© IOM; Photo: Stephan Görsch)

On 1 September 2017, Prof. André Anders was appointed Director of the IOM, replacing Prof. Bernd Rauschenbach as Director of the Institute. At the same time, he took over as Head of the Physics Department.

A laboratory for researching plasma deposition processes under vacuum was completed in 2020.

On 3 March 2025, Prof. Benjamin Dietzek-Ivanšić took over as the Scientific Director of the IOM.

== Current research topics ==
The structure of the IOM was transferred to the current structure with four research areas, three cross-sectional units and the incubator in 2021. The scientific and technological research and development work at the IOM is focussed on four research areas. The aim is to research and develop new surface functionalities for future-oriented fields of application. Each research area is managed independently in organisational terms.

The scientific results of the IOM are published in around 100 publications per year and protected in several patents per year. As is customary in the Leibniz Association, the institute undergoes a comprehensive evaluation every 7 years. Most recently, the IOM received a rating of "very good to excellent" in 2022.

=== Research topics ===
Research area 1: Ultra-precision surfaces

This research area focuses on beam-based technologies for ultra-precise processing and shaping of surfaces, near-surface areas and thin films. Micro- and nanostructuring with target specifications down to the sub-nanometre range are possible.

Research area 2: Barrier and precision coatings

This research area examines the production of thin films and coatings at relatively low process temperatures. The basic principles, technologies and applications of these coatings are analysed.

Research area 3: Biocompatible and bioactive surfaces

The research focus lies on the development of new intelligent biomaterials at interfaces and surfaces that enable external controllability/switchability. Tailor-made methods, experiments and modelling are intended to provide a comprehensive basic understanding of physics, which can then be applied in biomedical and bioanalytical contexts.

Research area 4: Surfaces of porous membrane filters

This research area investigates new technologies for the functionalisation and characterisation of porous polymers using radiochemical methods. Membrane-based filtration systems are used in numerous applications such as haemodialysis, water purification and beverage production.

Incubator: Explorative projects

The "Explorative Projects" area currently consists of two working groups: The "Switchable molecular functionalised surfaces" group deals with molecular electronics and spintronics.

The second working group "Surface modification with mass-selected molecular ions" (joint lab with the University of Leipzig) uses preparative mass spectrometry to deposit large molecular ions intact on surfaces.

=== Cross-section units ===
The four research areas of the IOM are supported by cross-sectional units with cross-sectional tasks. Each cross-sectional unit is managed independently in organisational terms.

The current cross-section units are:

Modelling and simulation

In this unit, the experimental work within the institute is accompanied and optimised by mathematical models.

Tools

The unit has the task of providing plasma and blasting tools for the work being carried out at the institute, some of which are unique and not commercially available.

Material characterisation and analytical service

The "Materials Characterisation and Analytical Service" cross-sectional unit provides all of the institute's working groups with extensive analytical methods, for example for the characterisation of surfaces or imaging processes.

Research infrastructure large-scale equipment

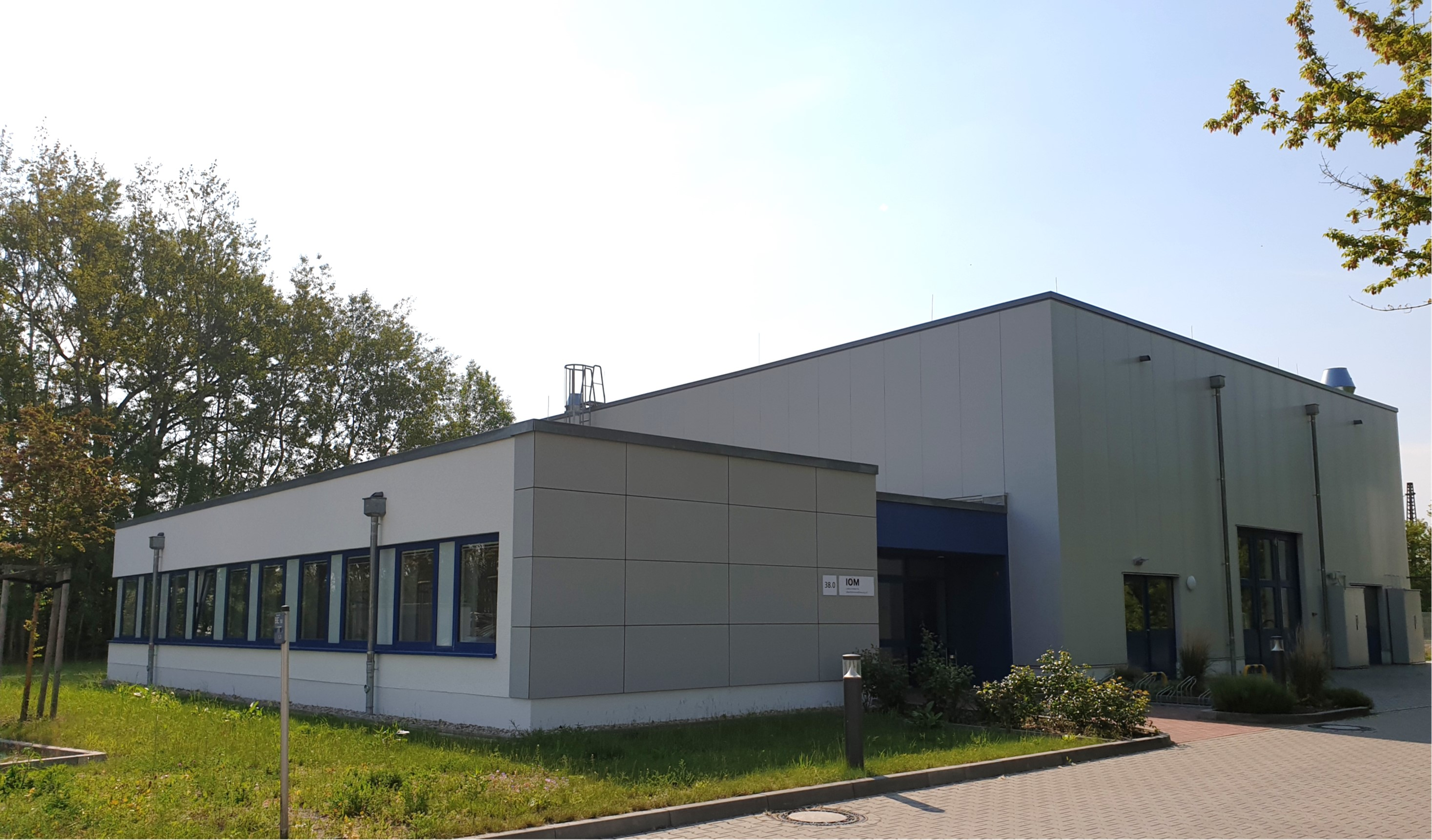
Application centre of the IOM (Building 38.0). (© IOM; Photo: Yvonne Bohne)

The IOM has a well-equipped research infrastructure, particularly in the area of large-scale scientific equipment. This includes a Cs-corrected transmission electron microscope in the Leipzig nanoanalytical centre (LenA) and the 10 MeV electron accelerator in the Hertz electron beam laboratory.

Application centre of the IOM (APZ)

One aim is to transfer technological developments from pilot scale to commercial utilisation (scale-up), particularly in the optical and chemical industries, semiconductor technology, mechanical engineering and medical technology.

== Spin-off companies & property rights ==
Several spin-off companies have already been founded on the basis of research results. Numerous industrial property rights such as patents and utility models have also been granted on the basis of research at the IOM. List of industrial property rights at.

Spin-offs:

· IOT – Innovative Oberflächentechnologien GmbH (founded 1998)

· NTG – Neue Technologien GmbH & Co. KG (founded 1999)

· Solarion GmbH (founded 2000, continued as Solarion AG from November 2006, acquired by OC3 AG in 2019)

· Cetelon Nanotechnik GmbH & Co. KG (founded 2001, 2021 taken over by Nanolacke Eilenburg GmbH)

· OPTEG GmbH (founded 2001), 2018 taken over by Bühler Leybold Optcis

· Trionplas Technologies GmbH (founded 2017)

· qCoat GmbH (founded 2019)

== Literature ==
Carsten Bundesmann: Zur Geschichte der Entwicklung und Anwendung von Breitstrahlionenquellen in Leipzig. 2020
