= André Anders =

German-American physicist (born 1961)

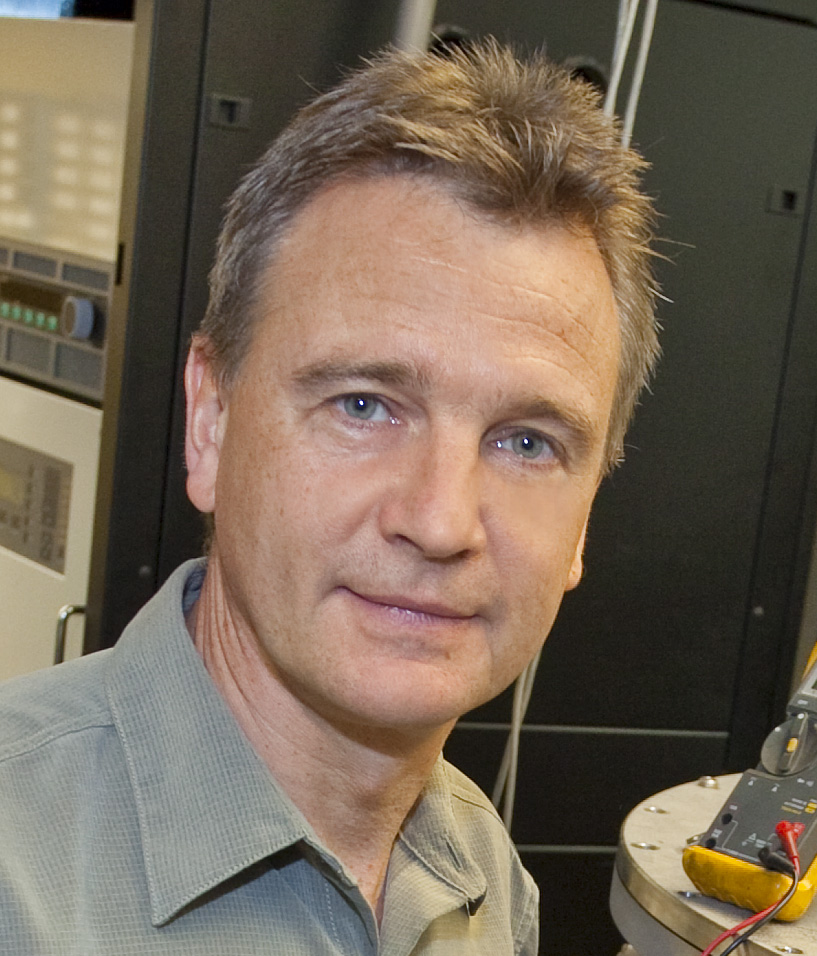
- Anders in 2009
- Born: 16 June 1961 (age 65); Ballenstedt, East Germany
- Education: University of Wrocław, Moscow State University, Humboldt University, (Dr. rer. nat. 1987)
- Known for: cathodic (vacuum) arcs, high-power impulse magnetron sputtering, thin films
- Scientific career
- Fields: Plasma Physics; Materials science
- Workplaces: Central Institute of Electron Physics, Lawrence Berkeley National Laboratory, Leipzig University, Leibniz Institute of Surface Engineering (IOM)

André Anders (born 1961) is a German-American experimental plasma physicist and materials scientist. He has been the director of the Leibniz Institute of Surface Engineering in Leipzig, Germany, since 2017. Previously, 1992-2017, he worked at Lawrence Berkeley National Laboratory, Berkeley, California. He is best known for his work on metal plasmas and thin film deposition by cathodic arcs and high power impulse magnetron sputtering. He was the editor-in-chief of Journal of Applied Physics (2014-2024) published by AIP Publishing.

== Early life and education ==
He was born in June 1961 in Ballenstedt, German Democratic Republic (East Germany). Early on he became interested in physics, astronomy, electrical engineering but also in music and history. In 7th grade he built a refracting telescope. In 1980, he studied Physics at the University of Wrocław, Wrocław, Poland, but only until the summer of 1981 because Martial Law was imposed in Poland (1981-1983). He continued his studies at Humboldt-University Berlin, East Germany, in the field of pulsed barrier discharges to obtain his "Diplom-Physiker" degree (1984). While being enrolled at Humboldt University, he was also admitted as a grad student to study plasma physics at the Lomonosov Moskau State University (1984-1986) in Moscow, Soviet Union. He obtained his PhD degree (Dr. rer. nat.) on pulsed atmospheric plasma jets from Humboldt-University, Berlin, in 1987.

== Career ==
=== Plasma physicist in East Berlin, East Germany (1987-1991) ===
His first position was with the Central Institute of Electron Physics of the Academy of Sciences in (East) Berlin, starting in 1987. After just some months of work, he was drafted to serve as a truck driver in the National People's Army of East Germany. While serving, he used his limited free time to compile his "Formulary for Plasma Physics", published by Akademie-Verlag in 1990. After the return to the academy, he worked on improving the lifetime of electrodes in high pressure sodium arc lamps and developed a laser-based technique to study cathode spots with nanosecond resolution.

=== Plasma applications in Berkeley, California (1992-2017) ===
As Staff Scientist and since 2001 Group Leader, he worked in various fields of ion beam and plasma applications, including plasma immersion ion implantation and deposition and plasma diagnostics of vacuum arcs. His text book on cathodic arcs and his generalized structure zone diagram are highly cited. His work on ultrathin diamond-like carbon films in the development of hard disk drives with storage exceeding 1 GB/in^{2} was recognized with an R&D100 Award in 2009. For more than a decade, he studied the plasma of HiPIMS (high power magnetron sputtering), especially the role of ionization zones ("spokes"), self-sputtering and gas recycling.

=== Professor of Applied Physics and Director of Leibniz IOM, Leipzig, Germany (since 2017) ===
In 2017, he assumed a joint appointment as full professor of applied physics at the Felix Bloch Institute of Solid State Physics at Leipzig University and director and CEO ("Vorstand") of the Leibniz Institute of Surface Engineering, both in Leipzig, Germany.

== Editorial work ==
Anders was the editor-in-chief of Journal of Applied Physics (2014-2024). Previously was an associate editor of that journal (2009-2014) and served on the editorial boards of Applied Physis Letters and the journal Surface and Coatings Technology.

== Awards and honors ==
- 1994: Paul A. Chatterton Young Investigator Award (ISDEIV-IEEE)
- 1997: R&D 100 Award for the Development of the Constricted Plasma Source
- 1998: elected Fellow of the Institute of Physics (IoP), UK
- 2000: elected Fellow of the Institute of Electrical and Electronic Engineers (IEEE)
- 2008: elected Fellow of the American Physical Society (APS)
- 2009: R&D 100 Award for a Pulsed Filtered Arc Deposition System
- 2010: Merit Award of IEEE, Nuclear and Plasma Science Societies
- 2011: Mentor Award of the Society of Vacuum Coaters
- 2011: elected Fellow of the American Vacuum Society (AVS)
- 2014: Walter P. Dyke Award, the highest award of the International Symposia of Discharges and Electrical Insulation (ISDEIV-IEEE)
- 2016: Nathaniel Sugerman Memorial Award, the highest award of the Society of Vacuum Coaters
- 2021: R.F. Bunshah Award, the highest award of the Advanced Surface Engineering Division at the AVS
- 2024: Leading Scientist Award, The European Joint Committee on Plasma and Ion Surface Engineering

== Books & publications ==
He is an author on over 350 publications, which have been cited more than 23,000 times by other scholars.

- A. Anders, A Formulary for Plasma Physics. Berlin: Akademie-Verlag, 1990. ISBN 3-05-501263-1 (Online).
- A. Anders, Ed. Handbook of Plasma Immersion Ion Implantation and Deposition. New York: Wiley, 2000. ISBN 978-0-471-24698-5 (Print).
- A. Anders, Cathodic Arcs: From Fractal Spots to Energetic Condensation. New York: Springer, 2008. ISBN 978-0-387-79107-4 (Print) and ISBN 978-0-387-79108-1 (Online).

== Personal life ==
In 1997, he married Christine Kurata, who works in the software industry. They have two children, Mieko and George. He has also a son, Mark, from a previous marriage.
