= Justus Mühlenpfordt =

German nuclear physicist (1911–2000)

- Born: 22 April 1911; Lübeck, German Empire
- Died: 2 October 2000 (aged 89); Leipzig, Germany
- Citizenship: Germany
- Education: Technische Hochschule
- Known for: Isotope separation German nuclear energy project Soviet atomic bomb project
- Scientific career
- Fields: Nuclear Physics
- Workplaces: Institute for Physics Stofftrennung; Academic Research Center for Isotopic Technologies (ARIT); Research Laboratories for Electrical Physics (EPRL); German-Physics Directorate, Nazi Party; Institute G

Justus Mühlenpfordt (22 April 1911 – 2 October 2000) was a German nuclear physicist. He received his doctorate from the Technische Hochschule Carolo-Wilhelmina zu Braunschweig, in 1936. He then worked in Gustav Hertz's laboratory at Siemens. In 1945, he was sent to Institute G, near Sukhumi and under the directorship of Hertz, to work on the Soviet atomic bomb project. Released from Soviet Union, Mühlenpfordt arrived in East Germany in 1955. He was appointed director of the Institut für physikalische Stofftrennung of the Academy of Sciences, in Leipzig. From 1969 until his retirement in 1974, Mühlenpfordt was director of the Forschungsbereiches Kern- und Isotopentechnik der Akademie.

== Early years ==
Mühlenpfordt was born in Lübeck. His father, Carl, was an architect and university professor, and his mother, Anna Dräger-Mühlenpfordt, was a painter and graphic designer. Anna was the daughter of Henry Dräger, founder of Drägerwerk AG. Carl was a professor at the Technische Hochschule Carolo-Wilhelmina zu Braunschweig (in the late 1960s or early 1970s, reorganized and renamed the Technische Universität Braunschweig) and a practicing architect.

== Education ==
Mühlenpfordt received his doctorate, in 1936, from the Technische Hochschule Carolo-Wilhelmina zu Braunschweig.

== Career ==
=== In Germany ===
In 1935, Mühlenpfordt, went to work for Gustav Hertz at Siemens. Among other things, Mühlenpfordt's research activities involved x-rays; an x-ray tube with a cross-shaped anode was named after him. Hertz conducted research activities in isotope separation, which effected Mühlenpfordt's career interests.

=== In the Soviet Union ===
How Mühlenpfordt got to the Soviet Union and his activities there are best understood in the context of four prominent Berlin scientists. Manfred von Ardenne, director of his private laboratory Forschungslaboratoriums für Elektronenphysik, Gustav Hertz, Nobel laureate and director of Research Laboratory II at Siemens, Peter Adolf Thiessen, ordinarius professor at the Humboldt University of Berlin and director of the Kaiser-Wilhelm-Institut für Physikalische Chemie und Elektrochemie in Berlin-Dahlem, and Max Volmer, ordinarius professor and director of the Physical Chemistry Institute at the Berlin Technische Hochschule, had made a pact. The pact was a pledge that whoever first made contact with the Soviets would speak for the rest. The objectives of their pact were threefold: (1) Prevent plunder of their institutes, (2) Continue their work with minimal interruption, and (3) Protect themselves from prosecution for any political acts of the past. Before the end of World War II, Thiessen, a member of the Nationalsozialistische Deutsche Arbeiterpartei, had Communist contacts. On 27 April 1945, Thiessen arrived at von Ardenne's institute in an armored vehicle with a major of the Soviet Army, who was also a leading Soviet chemist. All four of the pact members were taken to the Soviet Union along with colleagues from their institutes. Hertz was made head of Institute G, in Agudseri (Agudzery), about 10 km southeast of Sukhumi and a suburb of Gul’rips (Gulrip’shi). Topics assigned to Gustav Hertz's Institute G included: (1) Separation of isotopes by diffusion in a flow of inert gases, for which Gustav Hertz was the leader, (2) Development of a condensation pump, for which Justus Mühlenpfordt was the leader, (3) Design and build a mass spectrometer for determining the isotopic composition of uranium, for which Werner Schütze was the leader, (4) Development of frameless (ceramic) diffusion partitions for filters, for which Reinhold Reichmann was the leader, and (5) Development of a theory of stability and control of a diffusion cascade, for which Heinz Barwich was the leader; Barwich had been deputy to Hertz at Siemens. Other members of Institute G were Werner Hartmann, Werner Schütze and Karl-Franz Zühlke. Von Ardenne was made head of Institute A, in Sinop, a suburb of Sukhumi. Volmer went to the Nauchno-Issledovatel’skij Institut-9 (NII-9, Scientific Research Institute No. 9), in Moscow; he was given a design bureau to work on the production of heavy water. In Institute A, Thiessen became leader for developing techniques for manufacturing porous barriers for isotope separation.

After Mühlenpfordt's successful work at Institute G, he became chief of a design bureau in Leningrad, no earlier than 1950.

In preparation for release from the Soviet Union, it was standard practice to put personnel into quarantine for a few years if they worked on projects related to the Soviet atomic bomb project. Mühlenpfordt spent his quarantine at a facility in Agudzery (Agudseri), as did other German scientists. Additionally, in 1954, in preparation sending the German scientists to the Deutsche Demokratische Republik (DDR, German Democratic Republic), the DDR and the Soviet Union prepared a list of scientists they wished to keep in the DDR, due to their having worked on projects related to the Soviet atomic bomb project; this list was known as the "A-list". On this A-list were the names of 18 scientists; nine, possibly 10, of the names were associated with the Nikolaus Riehl group which worked at Plant No. 12 in Ehlektrostal' (Электросталь). Mühlenpfordt was on the list.

=== Back in Germany ===
Mühlenpfordt arrived in the DDR in 1955. He was appointed director of the Institut für physikalische Stofftrennung of the Academy of Sciences, in Leipzig; in 1964, the institute was renamed the Institut für stabile Isotope (Institute for Stable Isotopes). In 1960, he was also appointed a professor of the Academy of Sciences. In 1968, he was additionally appointed Beauftragter (Representative) of the Academy of Sciences.

From 1969 until his retirement in 1974, Mühlenpfordt was director of the Forschungsbereiches Kern- und Istopentechnik der Akademie der Wissenschaften (Research Division for Nuclear and Isotope Technology of the Academy of Sciences); the organization was later renamed the Forschungsbereich Kernwissenschaften der Akademie der Wissenschaften (Nuclear Science Research Division of the Academy of Sciences), and still later renamed the Forschungsbereich Physik der Akademie der Wissenschaften (Physics Research Division of the Academy of Sciences).

Upon his retirement, Mühlenpfordt devoted his interests to art, history, and philosophy, while still retaining active interests in scientific research – improvement of television and investigating methods of earthquake prediction.

== Professional Honors & Memberships ==
- Corresponding Member of the Akademie der Wissenschaften (Academy of Sciences) since 1969
- Member of the Leibniz-Sozietät der Wissenschaften zu Berlin e.V.
- Nationalpreis der Deutsche Demokratische Republik in 1961

== Literature ==
- Justus Mühlenpfordt The Importance of Stable Isotopes [In German], Kernenergie Volume 3, 816-822 (1960). Institutional affiliation: Institut für physikalische Stofftrennung, Leipzig.
- Justus Mühlenpfordt Obtention, Application, and Analysis of Stable Isotopes in the German Democratic Republic [In German], Kernenergie Volume 5, 208-211 (1962). Institutional affiliation: Institut für Physikalische Stofftrennung, Leipzig.
- Justus Mühlenpfordt The Institute of Stable Isotopes at Leipzig [In German], Isotopenpraxis Volume 2, 113-116 (1966)
- Justus Mühlenpfordt Refinement of Industrial Products by Substituting Hydrogen by Deuterium. Part I. [In German], Isotopenpraxis Volume 2, 119-121 (1966). Institutional affiliation: Institut für Stabile Isotope, Leipzig Deutschen Akademie der Wissenschaften, Berlin.

== Books ==
- Justus Mühlenpfordt Untersuchung über die Möglichkeit, auf photoelektrischem Wege die Messempfindlichkeit des Interferentialrefraltors nach Jamin zu Erhöhen, Doctoral Dissertation Thesis (Technische Hochschule Carolo-Wilhelmina zu Braunschweig, 1937)
- Aleksandr I. Brodskij and Justus Mühlenpfordt Isotopenchemie (Akademie-Verl., 1961)

== Bibliography ==
- Hartkopf, Werner, editor Die Berliner Akademie der Wissenschaften: Ihre Mitglieder und Preisträger 1700-1990 (Akademi Verlag, 1992)
- Hentschel, Klaus (editor) and Ann M. Hentschel (editorial assistant and translator) Physics and National Socialism: An Anthology of Primary Sources (Birkhäuser, 1996) ISBN 0-8176-5312-0
- Heinemann-Grüder, Andreas Keinerlei Untergang: German Armaments Engineers during the Second World War and in the Service of the Victorious Powers in Monika Renneberg and Mark Walker (editors) Science, Technology and National Socialism 30-50 (Cambridge, 2002 paperback edition) ISBN 0-521-52860-7
- Kruglov, Arkadii The History of the Soviet Atomic Industry (CRC, 2002)
- Maddrell, Paul "Spying on Science: Western Intelligence in Divided Germany 1945–1961" (Oxford, 2006) ISBN 0-19-926750-2
- Naimark, Norman M. The Russians in Germany: A History of the Soviet Zone of Occupation, 1945-1949 (Belknap, 1995)
- Obituary: Professor Dr.-Ing. Justus Mühlenpfordt, Isotopes in Environmental and Health Studies, Volume 36, Issue 4, 319-322 (2000)
- Oleynikov, Pavel V. German Scientists in the Soviet Atomic Project, The Nonproliferation Review Volume 7, Number 2, 1 – 30 (2000). The author has been a group leader at the Institute of Technical Physics of the Russian Federal Nuclear Center in Snezhinsk (Chelyabinsk-70).
