= High-power impulse magnetron sputtering =

HighPower LED

High-power impulse magnetron sputtering (HIPIMS or HiPIMS, also known as high-power pulsed magnetron sputtering, HPPMS) is a method for physical vapor deposition of thin films which is based on magnetron sputter deposition. HIPIMS utilises extremely high power densities of the order of kW⋅cm^{−2} in short pulses (impulses) of tens of microseconds at low duty cycle (on/off time ratio) of < 10%. Distinguishing features of HIPIMS are a high degree of ionisation of the sputtered metal and a high rate of molecular gas dissociation which result in high density of deposited films. The ionization and dissociation degree increase according to the peak cathode power. The limit is determined by the transition of the discharge from glow to arc phase. The peak power and the duty cycle are selected so as to maintain an average cathode power similar to conventional sputtering (1–10 W⋅cm^{−2}).

HIPIMS is used for:

- adhesion enhancing pretreatment of the substrate prior to coating deposition (substrate etching)
- deposition of thin films with high microstructure density

== HIPIMS plasma discharge ==
HIPIMS plasma is generated by a glow discharge where the discharge current density can reach several A⋅cm^{−2}, whilst the discharge voltage is maintained at several hundred volts. The discharge is homogeneously distributed across the surface of the cathode (target) however above a certain threshold of current density it becomes concentrated in narrow ionization zones that move along a path known as the target erosion "racetrack".

HIPIMS generates a high density plasma of the order of 10^{13} ions⋅cm^{−3} containing high fractions of target metal ions. The main ionisation mechanism is electron impact, which is balanced by charge exchange, diffusion, and plasma ejection in flares. The ionisation rates depend on the plasma density.
The ionisation degree of the metal vapour is a strong function of the peak current density of the discharge. At high current densities, sputtered ions with charge 2+ and higher – up to 5+ for V – can be generated. The appearance of target ions with charge states higher than 1+ is responsible for a potential secondary electron emission process that has a higher emission coefficient than the kinetic secondary emission found in conventional glow discharges. The establishment of a potential secondary electron emission may enhance the current of the discharge.
HIPIMS is typically operated in short pulse (impulse) mode with a low duty cycle in order to avoid overheating of the target and other system components. In every pulse the discharge goes through several stages:

- electrical breakdown
- gas plasma
- metal plasma
- steady state, which may be reached if the metal plasma is dense enough to effectively dominate over the gas plasma.

The negative voltage (bias voltage) applied to the substrate influences the energy and direction of motion of the positively charged particles that hit the substrate. The on-off cycle has a period on the order of milliseconds. Because the duty cycle is small (< 10%), only low average cathode power is the result (1–10 kW). The target can cool down during the "off time", thereby maintaining process stability.

The discharge that maintains HIPIMS is a high-current glow discharge, which is transient or quasistationary. Each pulse remains a glow up to a critical duration after which it transits to an arc discharge. If pulse length is kept below the critical duration, the discharge operates in a stable fashion indefinitely.

Initial observations by fast camera imaging in 2008 were recorded independently, demonstrated with better precision, and confirmed demonstrating that most ionization processes occur in spatially very limited ionization zones. The drift velocity was measured to be of the order of 10^{4} m/s, which is about only 10% of the electron drift velocity.

== Substrate pretreatement by HIPIMS ==
Substrate pretreatment in a plasma environment is required prior to deposition of thin films on mechanical components such as automotive parts, metal cutting tools and decorative fittings. The substrates are immersed in a plasma and biased to a high voltage of a few hundred volts. This causes high energy ion bombardment that sputters away any contamination. In cases when the plasma contains metal ions, they can be implanted into the substrate to a depth of a few nm. HIPIMS is used to generate a plasma with a high density and high proportion of metal ions. When looking at the film-substrate interface in cross-section, one can see a clean interface. Epitaxy or atomic registry is typical between the crystal of a nitride film and the crystal of a metal substrate when HIPIMS is used for pretreatment. HIPIMS has been used for the pretreatment of steel substrates for the first time in February 2001 by A.P. Ehiasarian.

Substrate biasing during pretreatment uses high voltages, which require purpose-designed arc detection and suppression technology. Dedicated DC substrate biasing units provide the most versatile option as they maximize substrate etch rates, minimise substrate damage, and can operate in systems with multiple cathodes. An alternative is the use of two HIPIMS power supplies synchronised in a master–slave configuration: one to establish the discharge and one to produce a pulsed substrate bias

== Thin-film deposition by HIPIMS ==
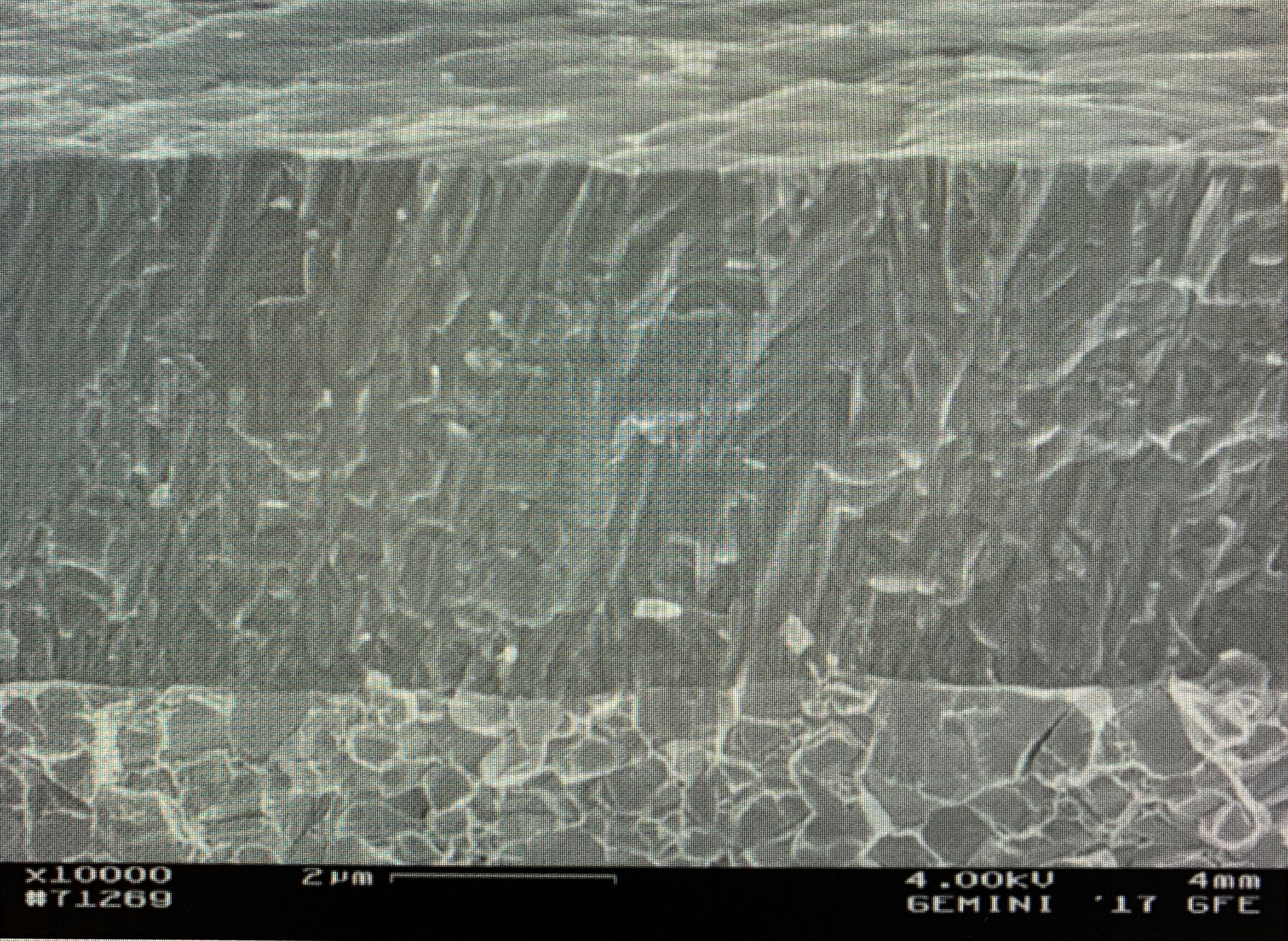
The figure shows the surface topography and structure of the HiPIMS FerroCon tool coating by CemeCon AG on a carbide substrate, magnified under an electron microscope.

Thin films deposited by HIPIMS at discharge current density > 0.5 A⋅cm^{−2} have a dense columnar structure with no voids.
The deposition of copper films by HIPIMS was reported for the first time by V. Kouznetsov for the application of filling 1 μm vias with aspect ratio of 1:1.2

Transition metal nitride (CrN) thin films were deposited by HIPIMS for the first time in February 2001 by A.P. Ehiasarian. The first thorough investigation of films deposited by HIPIMS by TEM demonstrated a dense microstructure, free of large scale defects. The films had a high hardness, good corrosion resistance and low sliding wear coefficient. The commercialisation of HIPIMS hardware that followed made the technology accessible to the wider scientific community and triggered developments in a number of areas.

=== Reactive HiPIMS ===
Similarly to what is witnessed in conventional reactive sputter deposition process, HiPIMS has also been used to attain oxide or nitride-based films on several substrates, as is seen in the list below. However, as it is characteristic of these methods, the performance of such depositions has significant hysteresis and need to be carefully examined to inspect the optimal operation points. Significant overviews of reactive HiPIMS were published by André Anders and Kubart et al.

=== Deposition Examples ===
The following materials have, among others, been deposited successfully by HIPIMS:

- Corrosion Resistant: CrN/NbN nanoscale multilayer
- Oxidation Resistant: CrAlYN/CrN nanoscale multilayer, Ti-Al-Si-N, Cr-Al-Si-N nanocomposite
- Optical: Ag, TiO_{2}, ZnO, InSnO, ZrO_{2}, CuInGaSe
- MAX phases: TiSiC
- Microelectronics: Cu, Ti, TiN, Ta, TaN
- Hard Coatings: carbon nitride CN_{x}, Ti–C nanocomposite
- Hydrophobic: HfO_{2}

== Industrial application ==
HIPIMS has been successfully applied for the deposition of thin films in industry, particularly on cutting tools. The first HIPIMS coating units appeared on the market in 2006.

The gold version of the Apple iPhone 12 Pro uses this process on the structural stainless steel band that also serves as the device's antenna system.

== Advantages ==
The main advantages of HIPIMS coatings include a denser coating morphology and an increased ratio of hardness to Young's modulus compared to conventional PVD coatings. Whereas comparable conventional nano-structured (Ti,Al)N coatings have a hardness of 25 GPa and a Young's modulus of 460 GPa, the hardness of the new HIPIMS coating is higher than 30 GPa with a Young's modulus of 368 GPa. The ratio between hardness and Young's modulus is a measure of the toughness properties of the coating. The desirable condition is high hardness with a relatively small Young's modulus, such as can be found in HIPIMS coatings. Recently, innovative applications of HIPIMS coated surfaces for biomedical applications were reported by Rtimi et al.
