= Jürgen =

Male given name

Jürgen or Jurgen is a popular male given name in Germany, Estonia, Belgium and the Netherlands. Notable people named Jürgen include:

== A ==
- Jürgen Ahrend (1930–2024), German organ builder
- Jürgen Alzen (born 1962), German race car driver
- Jürgen Arndt, East German rower
- Jürgen Aschoff (1913–1998), German physician and biologist

== B ==
- Jürgen Baldiga (1959–1993), German photographer
- Jürgen Barke (born 1962), German politician
- Jürgen Barth (born 1947), German engineer and racecar driver
- Jürgen Barth (cyclist) (1943–2011), German cyclist
- Jürgen Bartsch (1946–1976), German serial killer
- Jurgen Van den Broeck (born 1983), Belgian cyclist
- Jürgen von Beckerath (1920–2016), German Egyptologist
- Jürgen Berghahn (born 1960), German politician
- Jürgen Bertow (born 1950), East German rower
- Jürgen Blin (1943–2022), West German boxer
- Jürgen Bogs (born 1947), German football manager
- Jürgen Brähmer (born 1978), German boxer
- Jürgen Bräuninger, South African composer and professor
- Jürgen Budday (born 1948), German conductor

== C ==
- Jürgen Cain Külbel (born 1956), German journalist and investigator
- Jürgen Chrobog (born 1940), German diplomat
- Jürgen Colin (born 1981), Dutch footballer
- Jürgen Colombo (born 1949), West German cyclist
- Jürgen Croy (born 1946), East German footballer

== D ==
- Jürgen Dehmel (born 1958), German bass guitarist and songwriter
- Jürgen Drews (born 1945), German singer
- Jürgen Damm (born 1992), Mexican footballer
- Jürgen Draeger (1940–2020), German actor
- Jürgen Dirkx (born 1975), Dutch footballer

== E ==
- Jürgen Ehlers (1929–2008), German physicist
- Jürgen Eschert (born 1941), West German canoeist
- Jürgen Evers (born 1964), West German sprinter

== F ==
- Jürgen Fanghänel (born 1951), East German boxer
- Jürgen von Farensbach (1551–1602), Baltic German nobleman and Livonian general
- Jürgen Fassbender (born 1948), West German tennis player
- Jürgen Flimm (1941–2023), German theater and opera director

== G ==
- Jürgen Gauß (born 1960), German chemist
- Jürgen Gauß (officer) (1918–1996), German military commander
- Jürgen Geschke (born 1943), East German cyclist
- Jürgen Gjasula (born 1985), Albanian footballer
- Jürgen Gmehling (born 1946), German chemist
- Jürgen Goslar (1927–2021), German actor and director
- Jürgen Grabowski (1944–2022), West German footballer
- Jürgen Graf (1951–2025), Swiss author and pseudohistorian
- Jürgen-Peter Graf (born 1952), German lawyer
- Jürgen Gröbler (born 1946), German rowing coach
- Jürgen Groh (born 1956), West German footballer

== H ==
- Jürgen Haase (born 1945), East German runner
- Jürgen Habermas (1929–2026), German sociologist and philosopher
- Jürgen Hartmann (born 1962), German footballer and coach
- Jürgen Henkys (1929–2015), German theologian
- Jürgen Henn (born 1987), Estonian football manager and coach
- Jürgen Heuser (born 1953), East German weightlifter
- Jürgen Hildebrand (born 1948), East German handball player
- Jürgen Hingsen (born 1958), West German decathlete

== K ==
- Jürgen Kehrer (born 1956), German journalist and writer
- Jürgen Klinsmann (born 1964), German footballer, manager and pundit
- Jürgen Klopp (born 1967), German footballer and manager
- Jürgen Koch (born 1973), Austrian badminton player
- Jürgen Kocka (born 1941), German historian
- Jürgen Kohler (born 1965), German footballer
- Jürgen Kretz (born 1982), German politician
- Jürgen Kurbjuhn (1940–2014), German footballer
- Jürgen Kuresoo (born 1987), Estonian footballer

== L ==
- Jürgen Ligi (born 1959), Estonian politician
- Jürgen von der Lippe (born 1948), German television presenter, entertainer, actor and comedian
- Jürgen Loacker (born 1974), Austrian bobsledder
- Jürgen Locadia (born 1993), Dutch association footballer

== M ==
- Jürgen Macho (born 1977), Austrian footballer
- Jürgen Mandl (born 1965), Austrian sportsman-politician
- Jürgen Marcus (1948–2018), German singer
- Jürgen May (born 1942), East German middle distance runner
- Jürgen Melzer (born 1981), Austrian tennis player
- Jürgen Milewski (born 1957), German footballer
- Jürgen Mittelstraß (born 1936), German philosopher
- Jürgen Möllemann (1945–2003), German politician
- Jürgen Moltmann (1926–2024), German reformed theologian
- Jürgen Mossack (born 1948), German-born Panamanian lawyer
- Jürgen Moser (1928–1999), German mathematician

== N ==
- Jürgen Neukirch (1937–1997) German mathematician
- Jürgen Nöldner (1941–2022), East German footballer

== O ==
- Jürgen Oesten (1913–2010), German World War II U-boat commander
- Jürgen Ovens (1623–1678), Dutch painter

== P ==
- Jürgen Paeke (born 1948), East German gymnast
- Jürgen Pahl (born 1956), German footballer
- Jürgen Panis (born 1975), Austrian footballer
- Jürgen Partenheimer (born 1947), German artist
- Jürgen Patocka (born 1977), Austrian footballer
- Jürgen Pezzi, Italian luger
- Jürgen Piepenburg (1941–2025), German football player and manager
- Jürgen Plagemann (1936–2026), German rower
- Jürgen Pommerenke (born 1953), East German footballer and manager
- Jürgen Ponto (1923–1977), German banker
- Jürgen Prochnow (born 1941), German-American actor

== R ==
- Jürgen Raab (born 1958), German footballer
- Jürgen Reil (born 1966), German musician
- Jürgen Rieger (1946–2009), German politician
- Jürgen Rijkers (born 1967), Dutch DJ, remixer, producer and artist known as DJ Jurgen
- Jürgen Röber (born 1953), German football manager and former player
- Jürgen Rohwer (1924–2015), German military historian
- Jürgen Roland (1925–2007), German film director
- Jürgen Rooste (born 1979), Estonian poet
- Jürgen Rosenthal (born 1940), German rock drummer
- Jürgen Rüttgers (born 1951), German politician

== S ==
- Jürgen Säumel (born 1984), Australian footballer
- Jürgen Schadeberg (1931–2020), South African photographer
- Jürgen Schmidhuber (born 1963), German computer scientist and artificial intelligence researcher
- Jürgen Schmude (1936–2025), German politician of the SPD
- Jürgen Schreiber (journalist) (1947–2022), German investigative journalist
- Jürgen Schreiber (businessman) (born 1962), German business executive
- Jürgen E. Schrempp (born 1944), German businessman; CEO of Daimler Chrysler
- Jürgen Schröder (disambiguation)
- Jürgen Schult (born 1960), East German discus thrower
- Jürgen Schütze (1951–2000), East German racing cyclist
- Jürgen Seeberger (born 1965), German footballer and manager
- Jürgen Seyfarth (born 1962), German rower
- Jürgen Sparwasser (born 1948), East German footballer and manager
- Jürgen Stark (born 1948), German economist
- Jürgen Steinmetz, German heavy metal bass guitarist (Silent Force)
- Jürgen Stock (born 1959), German law enforcement officer
- Jürgen Straub (born 1953), East German middle distance runner
- Jürgen Stroop (1895–1952), German Nazi SS officer, executed for war crimes
- Jürgen F. Strube (born 1939), German businessman
- Jürgen Sundermann (1940–2022), German footballer and manager

== T ==
- Jürgen Theobaldy (born 1944), German poet and writer
- Jürgen Thorwald (1915–2006), German writer
- Jürgen Todenhöfer (born 1940), German politician and author
- Jürgen Tonkel (born 1962), German actor
- Jürgen Trittin (born 1954), German green politician
- Jürgen Trumpf (1931–2023), German diplomat

== U ==
- Jürgen Untermann (1928–2013), German linguist, Indo-Europeanist and epigraphist

== V ==
- Jurgen Verstrepen (born 1966), Belgian politician and former radio and television presenter
- Jürgen Vollmer (born 1939), German photographer
- Jürgen Vsych (born 1968), American filmmaker

== W ==
- Jurgen Van de Walle (born 1977), Belgian bicycle road racer
- Jürgen Warnatz (1944–2007), German physicist
- Jürgen Warnke (1932–2013), German lawyer and politician
- Jürgen Werner (disambiguation), several people
- Jürgen Wullenwever (c. 1492–1537), mayor of Lübeck from 1533–1535

== Z ==
- Jürgen Zimmerling (1952–2005), German MEP
- Jürgen Zopp (born 1988), Estonian tennis player

== See also ==
- Hans-Jürgen
- Jurgens
- Jürgensen
- Jürgenshagen
- Jürgenstorf
- Jørgen
