= Hans-Jürgen =

Hans-Jürgen (or rarely Hansjürgen) is a German masculine given name. Notable people with the name include:

- Hans-Jürgen Abt of Abt Sportsline, a motor racing and auto tuning company based in Kempten im Allgäu, Germany
- Hans-Jürgen von Arnim (1889–1962), German colonel-general (Generaloberst) who served during World War II
- Hans-Jürgen Baake (born 1954), German footballer
- Hans-Jürgen Bäsler (1938–2002), German footballer
- Hans-Jürgen Bäumler (born 1942), German pair skater, actor, singer and television host
- Hans-Jürgen Becher (1941–2026), German footballer
- Hans-Jürgen Berger (born 1951), German long jumper who competed in the 1976 Summer Olympics
- Hans-Jürgen von Blumenthal (1907–1944), German aristocrat and Army officer in World War II
- Hans-Jürgen Bode (1941–2022), West German handball player who competed in the 1972 Summer Olympics
- Hans-Jürgen Bombach (born 1945), East German sprinter who specialized in the 100 and 200 metres
- Hans-Jürgen Borchers (1926–2011), German mathematical physicist at the Georg-August-Universität Göttingen
- Hans-Jürgen von Bose (born 1953), German composer
- Hans-Jürgen Boysen (born 1957), German football player who was most recently manager of SV Sandhausen
- Hans-Jürgen Bradler (born 1948), German football goalkeeper
- Hans Jürgen Briegel (born 1962), German theoretical physicist
- Hans-Jürgen Buchner (born 1944), Bavarian songwriter, singer, and musician
- Hans-Jürgen Dollheiser (1928–1995), German field hockey player who competed in the 1952 Summer Olympics
- Hans-Jürgen Dörner (1951–2022), German football player and coach
- Hans Jürgen Eysenck (1916–1997), German-born British psychologist
- Hans-Jürgen Felsen (born 1940), German sprinter
- Hans-Jürgen Gede (born 1956), German football coach and former player
- Hans-Jürgen Gerhardt (born 1954), East German bobsledder who competed in the late 1970s and early 1980s
- Hans-Jürgen Gundelach (born 1963), German football player
- Hans-Jürgen Hehn (born 1944), German fencer
- Hans-Jürgen Jansen (born 1941), German footballer
- Hans Jürgen Kiebach (1930–1995), German production designer, art director and set decorator
- Hans-Jürgen Klein (born 1952), German politician for the Alliance '90/The Greens
- Hans-Jürgen Köper (born 1951), German football manager and former midfielder
- Hans-Jürgen Krahl (1943–1970), West German philosophy student and political activist
- Hans-Jürgen Kreische (1947–2026), East German footballer
- Hans-Jürgen Krupp (1933–2024), German politician, economist, professor and president of the University of Frankfurt
- Hans-Jürgen Krysmanski (1935–2016), German sociologist, falsely stated to have been a member of the German Communist Party
- Hans-Jürgen Kurrat (born 1944), German football striker
- Hans Jürgen Massaquoi (1926–2013), German American journalist and author
- Hans-Jürgen Merten (1946–2005), pilot of Helios Airways Flight 522 that crashed into a mountain in Greece on 14 August 2005
- Hans-Jurgen Muller (born 1955), German television and movie actor
- Hans-Jürgen Papier (born 1943), German scholar of constitutional law, President of the Federal Constitutional Court of Germany 2002–2010
- Hans-Jürgen Pohmann (born 1947), tennis player from Germany
- Hans Jürgen Press (1926–2002), German illustrator and writer of children's books
- Hans-Jürgen Riediger (born 1955), German soccer player
- Hans-Jürgen Riemenschneider (born 1949), West German sprint canoeist
- Hans-Jürgen Ripp (1946–2021), German football player
- Hans-Jürgen Salewski (born 1956), German footballer
- Hans-Jürgen Schatz (born 1958), German television actor
- Hans-Jürgen Schlieker (1924–2004), German abstract painter, grouped with Hans Hartung, Bernard Schultze and Emil Schumacher
- Hans-Jürgen Stammer (born 1899), German zoologist, ecologist and director of the Zoological Institute of the University Erlangen
- Hans-Jürgen Stumpff (1889–1968), German general of the Luftwaffe during the Second World War
- Hans-Jürgen Sundermann (1940–2022), German football player and manager
- Hans-Jürgen Syberberg (born 1935), German film director, whose best known film is his lengthy feature, Hitler: A Film from Germany
- Hans-Jurgen Tiemann (born 1974), race driver from Germany
- Hans-Jürgen Tode (born 1957), East German sprint canoeist
- Hans Jürgen Todt (born 1937), German modern pentathlete
- Hans-Jürgen Tritschoks (born 1955), German football manager
- Hans-Jürgen Veil (born 1946), German wrestler who competed in the 1972 Summer Olympics and in the 1976 Summer Olympics
- Hans-Jürgen Wallbrecht (1943–1970), German rower who competed for the Unified Team of Germany in the 1964 Summer Olympics
- Hans-Jürgen Walter (born 1944), German psychologist and psychotherapist known as the main founder of Gestalt Theoretical Psychotherapy
- Hans-Jürgen Weber (born 1955), football referee from Germany
- Hans-Jürgen Wischnewski (1922–2005), German Social Democrat politician
- Hans-Jürgen Wittkamp (born 1947), German football player
- Hans-Jürgen Wloka (born 1951), German football player

Hansjürgen

- Hansjürgen Doss (born 1936), German politician
- Hansjürgen Matthies (1928–2005), German pharmacologist
- Hansjürgen Reinicke (1902–1978), German military officer
- Hansjürgen Schaefer (1930–1999), German musicologist and music critic

== See also ==
- Hans (given name)
- Jürgen
