= Jürgens =

Jürgens (also spelled Jurgens and Juergens) is a German surname. It comes from the Greek "Geōrgios" (Γεώργιος), meaning "farmer" or "earth-worker."

== Notable people with the surname spelled Jürgens ==
- Andrea Jürgens (1967–2017), German schlager singer, child star of the late 1970s
- Curd Jürgens (1915–1982), German/Austrian actor
- Hartmut Jürgens (1955–2017), German mathematician
- Hermann Jürgens (1847-1916), German Jesuit priest, Archbishop of Bombay (India)
- Jürgen Jürgens (1925-1994), German conductor
- Manfred W. Jürgens (born 1956), German painter and photographer
- Stefan Jürgens (actor) (born 1963), German actor
- Steffen C. Jürgens (born 1967), German actor and filmmaker
- Udo Jürgens (1934–2014), Austrian singer-songwriter
- Vera Jürgens (born 1969), Bulgaria-born German player with title of Woman Grandmaster

== Popular people with the surname spelled Jurgens ==
- Antonius Johannes Jurgens (1867–1945), Dutch-British entrepreneur
- Antoon Jurgens (1805–1880), Dutch margarine and butter merchant and industrialist
- Arvīds Jurgens (1905–1955), Latvian footballer, ice hockey, basketball and bandy player
- Bruce Jurgens (born 1965), American film maker
- Cam Jurgens (born 1999), American football player
- Dan Jurgens (born 1959), American comic artist
- Dick Jurgens (1910–1995), American musician
- Lois Jurgens (1925–2013), American criminal
- Michael Jurgens (born 2000), American football player
- Victor Jurgens (1915–1982), American cinematographer and director
- William Jurgens (fl. late 20th century), American historian and religious leader

== See also ==
- Jürgen, a list of people with the given name, also Jurgen
- Jorgensen, Danish-Norwegian version of the surname
