= Magnisphyricon =

Studio album by Sons of Seasons
- Released: 1 April 2011
- Genres: Symphonic metal, progressive metal
- Length: 66:03
- Label: Napalm
- Producers: Oliver Palotai & Sons of Seasons

Sons of Seasons chronology
Gods of Vermin (2009)	Magnisphyricon (2011)

Magnisphyricon is the second studio album by the German symphonic metal band Sons of Seasons, released in 2011.

The album title, cover art and track list was revealed through Myspace on January 22, 2011.

== Track listing ==
All lyrics by Oliver Palotai, music as indicated

1. "Magnisphyricon: Temperance" (Palotai) – 2:03
2. "Bubonic Waltz" (Palotai) – 5:47
3. "Soul Symmetry" (Pepe Pierez) – 5:01
4. "Sanctuary" (Palotai) – 5:56
5. "Casus Belli I: Guilt's Mirror" (Pierez, Henning Basse, Palotai) – 6:01
6. "Magnisphyricon: Adjustment" (Palotai) – 0:41
7. "Into the Void" (Basse, Palotai) – 5:07
8. "A Nightbird's Gospel" (Palotai) – 7:03
9. "Tales of Greed" (Palotai) – 4:56
10. "Lilith" (Pierez, Basse, Palotai) – 5:30
11. "Casus Belli II: Necrologue to the Unborn" (Pierez, Basse, Palotai) – 5:26
12. "Magnisphyricon: The Aeon" (Palotai) – 0:23
13. "1413" (Pierez, Basse, Palotai) – 6:53
14. "Yesteryears" (Palotai) – 5:06

== Personnel ==
Band members

- Henning Basse – lead and backing vocals
- Oliver Palotai – keyboards, guitars, backing vocals
- Pepe Pierez – guitars, backing vocals
- Jürgen Steinmetz – bass
- Daniel Schild – drums, percussion

Additional musicians

- Simone Simons – vocals on "Sanctuary", backing vocals
- Guoimar Espiñeira Pandelo - flute
- Torger Neuhaus, Michelle Gierke - choir

Production

- Dennis Ward - mixing
