= Gods of Vermin =

Studio album by Sons of Seasons
- Released: 30 April 2009
- Studio: Vocalbase Studio, Lüneburg; Deep Fridge Studio, Aachen; Rhön Records, Fulda; Mastersound Studios, Steinheim, Germany
- Genre: Symphonic metal, progressive metal
- Length: 69:59
- Label: Napalm
- Producer: Sons of Seasons, Alexander Krull

Sons of Seasons chronology
Gods of Vermin (2009)	Magnisphyricon (2011)

Limited edition Cd cover

Professional ratings
Review scores
Source	Rating
Allmusic	(favorable)

Gods of Vermin is the first studio album by the German symphonic metal band Sons of Seasons, released in 2009. The album features as guests Epica's members Simone Simons and Mark Jansen and former member Luca Princiotta.

== Track listing ==
All music by Oliver Palotai, except "Sanatorium Song" by Palotai and Henning Basse. All vocal lines by Basse and Palotai, except where indicated

1. "The Place Where I Hide" (instrumental) – 1:10
2. "Gods of Vermin" (Basse, Palotai, Tijs Vanneste) – 6:00
3. "A Blind Man's Resolution" (Basse, Palotai, Vanneste) – 4:38
4. "Fallen Family" (Basse, Palotai, Simons) – 5:11
5. "The Piper" (Basse, Palotai, Vanneste) – 4:55
6. "Wheel of Guilt" – 7:59
7. "Belial's Tower" – 6:21
8. "Fall of Byzanz" – 6:33
9. "Wintersmith" (Basse, Palotai, Simons) – 5:24
10. "Dead Man's Shadows" – 3:48
11. "Sanatorium Song" (Basse, Palotai, Vanneste) – 5:43
12. "Third Moon Rising" – 7:11
13. "Melanchorium" (limited edition bonustrack) – 7:06

== Personnel ==
Band members

- Henning Basse – lead vocals
- Oliver Palotai – keyboards, guitars, engineer
- Jürgen Steinmetz – bass
- Daniel Schild – drums, percussion

Additional musicians

- Simone Simons – vocals on tracks 4 and 9, backing vocals on track 8 and cover art model
- Mark Jansen – grunts on track 4
- Tijs Vanneste – vocals
- Luca Princiotta – guitar solo on track 11
- Christian Meike, Jan Peter – additional choir

Production

- Alexander Krull – producer, engineer, mixing
- Norman Meiritz – drum engineer
