= Friedrich Jung (pharmacologist) =

German pharmacologist (1915–1997)

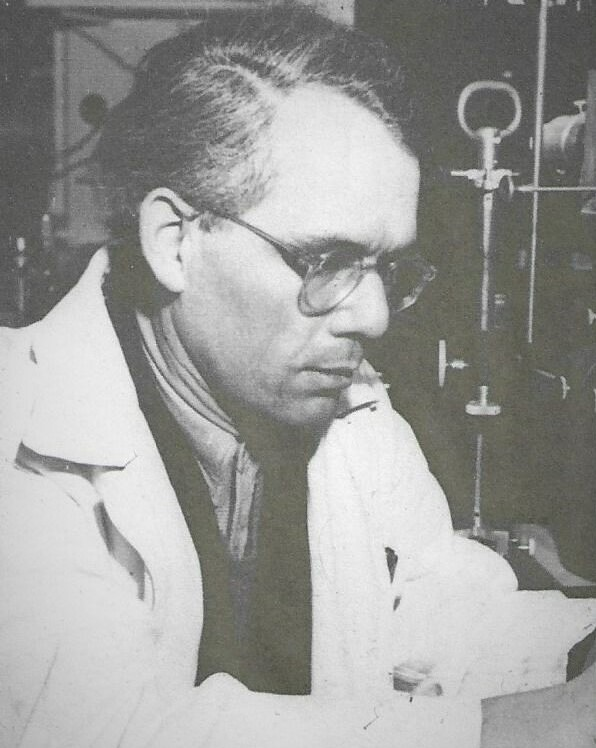
- Friedrich Jung at work (circa 1960s)
- Born: 21 April 1915; Friedrichshafen, Germany
- Died: 5 August 1997 (aged 82); Berlin, Germany
- Occupation: Pharmacologist
- Political party: SED
- Spouse: Waltraut Schwarzkopff
- Children: 1

Friedrich Jung (21 April 1915 – 5 August 1997) was a German doctor who became a leading Academic and Research Pharmacologist in the German Democratic Republic.

Between 1949 and 1972 he was a professor at the Humboldt University of Berlin. He also served as the director of various research institutes outside the universities sector including, between 1972 and 1980, the Central Institute for Molecular Biology at Berlin-Buch.

== Life ==
=== Early years ===
Friedrich Jung was born in Friedrichshafen, a prosperous mid-sized town on the north shore of the Bodensee. Between 1934 and 1939 he studied Medicine at Tübingen, Königsberg and Berlin. He received his doctorate from Tübingen in 1940. As a student he was a member of the Nazi German Students' League and of the Nazi Drivers' Corps.

=== War ===
Widespread European war had broken out in 1939. In 1940/41 Jung worked as a junior doctor in a medical corps. In 1941/42 he worked at the Military Medical Academy in Berlin, where he was involved in a poison gas research project. Here he was one of the first people to apply electron-microscopy to biological research subjects. While at the Institute he joined a political opposition group around Robert Havemann and Fritz von Bergmann. Another group member was Waltraut Schwarzkopff whom Jung later married. Germany at this time was ruled as a one- party dictatorship, and Jung's involvement in political opposition led to his being identified as "politically unreliable". He was removed from the institute and sent to the front, serving as a medical officer between 1942 and 1944.

During the less hectic periods in his life on the front line he was able to complete a dissertation for his habilitation, and during a period of leave in 1944 he received the qualification from the Humboldt. During the closing months of war he served on the western front, advising an army company on toxicology issues. After that, early in 1945, he found himself back in the Bodensee area, summoned to work at the massive Urlau Munitions Establishment, on a secret project which involved arming grenades with highly toxic battle chemicals. War ended in May 1945, and together with the facility commander at Urlau, in defiance of orders from the top that the entire facility should be blown up, Jung was able to mediate its bloodless hand-over to French troops.

=== Academia and beyond ===
After the war Friedrich Jung worked briefly in Tübingen, before taking a post, in 1946, at Würzburg University, as Acting Director of the Pharmacology Institute there. During this period, in 1946/47 Jung participated as an expert witness in the "Nuremberg Doctors' trial". He appeared as a defence witness on behalf of Adolf Pokorny (whom the court acquitted). In 1949 he moved from Würzburg to the Soviet occupation zone, taking a job at the recently established Institute for Pharmacology at Buch, a suburb on the northern side of Berlin. The institute was part of the German Academy of Sciences at Berlin. Part of the context for this career move came from Jung's rejection for a vacant professorship at Würzburg, where the faculty had instead selected for the promotion a former Nazi Party member. The Soviet Administrators in the territory that in October 1949 was re-founded as the German Democratic Republic had worked hard since 1945 to attract scientists from the western occupation zones to their version of Germany, with offers of professorships and other senior positions. Their efforts had gone largely unrewarded: Friedrich Jung was one of very few academics to emigrate, within what had previously been Germany, from west to east.

His initial post at the Academy, in addition to working at the Pharmacology Institute, involved heading up the department of Pharmacology and Experimental Pathology. In 1956 he took over as director of the Pharmacology Institute. Further promotions followed as departments were reconfigured. Between 1972 and 1980 he was the director of a newly enlarged Pharmacology Institute which now also incorporated several previously separate departments and the Central Institute of Molecular Biology. His successor in charge of this expanded department was the pathologist Karl-Wolfgang Zschiesche who had been brought over to Berlin in 1979 from the Central Institute for Microbiology and Experimental Therapy at Jena. Concurrently with his posts at the Academy in Berlin-Buch, Friedrich Jung was also a professor for Pharmacology and Toxicology at the Humboldt University of Berlin, and from 1956 Director of the Humboldt's equivalent institute.

Between 1959 and 1990 Friedrich Jung was also the chairman of the National Expert Committee for the Pharmaceutical Sector (ZGA / Zentrale Gutachterausschusse für das Arzneimittelwesen), which essentially meant he was one of those responsible for the Drugs sector in the German Democratic Republic and for authorization of medical drugs. As a top expert in his field he was also drawn into the Geneva negotiations on the banning of biological and chemical weapons, and served in national and international committees concerned with peace and disarmament.

=== Régime change ===
The breach of the Berlin Wall by protesters in November 1989, and subsequent evidence that the Soviet military had no orders violently to put down the rising tide of anti-régime protest, opened the way for a succession of events which would put an end to the East German one- party dictatorship, followed by German reunification in October 1990. By that time Jung was 75. Following reunification he was a founder of the Leibnitz Society, set up to continue the work of the old East German Academy of Sciences.

== Research fields and legacy ==
A principal research field for Jung was the structure and operation of erythrocytes (red blood cells). In this context he also undertook research into the effects of Phenylhydrazine and other Hemotoxins. Within the German Democratic Republic most of the teaching professorships in Pharmacology and a plethora of other senior posts in the academic institutes with a biomedical focus came to be occupied by former students of Friedrich Jung. Prominent among these was Werner Scheler. Jung's pupils also included Peter Oehme and Hansjürgen Matthies.

== Recognition ==
Friedrich Jung – Publications (not a complete list)
- Arzneiverordnungen. Hirzel, Leipzig 1958 (als Mitherausgeber)
- Arzt und Philosophie. Humanismus, Erkenntnis, Praxis. Volk und Gesundheit, Berlin 1961 (mit anderen Autoren)
- Kommentar zum Deutschen Arzneibuch. 7. Ausgabe. Akademie-Verlag, Berlin 1969
- mehrere Tagungsbände zu den von der Deutschen Akademie der Wissenschaften zu Berlin veranstalteten Internationalen Symposien über Struktur und Funktion der Erythrocyten. Akademie-Verlag, Berlin zwischen 1959 und 1975 (als Mitherausgeber)
- Student und Arzt in jener Zeit. In: Samuel Mitja Rapoport, Achim Thom (Hrsg.): Das Schicksal der Medizin im Faschismus. Auftrag und Verpflichtung zur Bewahrung von Humanismus und Frieden. Internationales wissenschaftliches Symposium europäischer Sektionen der IPPNW (17.–18. November 1988, Erfurt/Weimar/DDR). Volk und Gesundheit, Berlin 1989, p. 274–281.
- 1957 National Prize of East Germany
- 1961 Corresponding member German Academy of Sciences (bio-sciences division)
- 1962 Patriotic Order of Merit in Bronze
- 1963 Honoured Doctor of the People
- 1964 Full member German Academy of Sciences (bio-sciences division)
- 1965 National Prize of East Germany
- 1975 Patriotic Order of Merit in Silver
- 1985 Patriotic Order of Merit in Gold
- 1987 National Prize of East Germany
