= Peter Oehme =

German pharmacologist

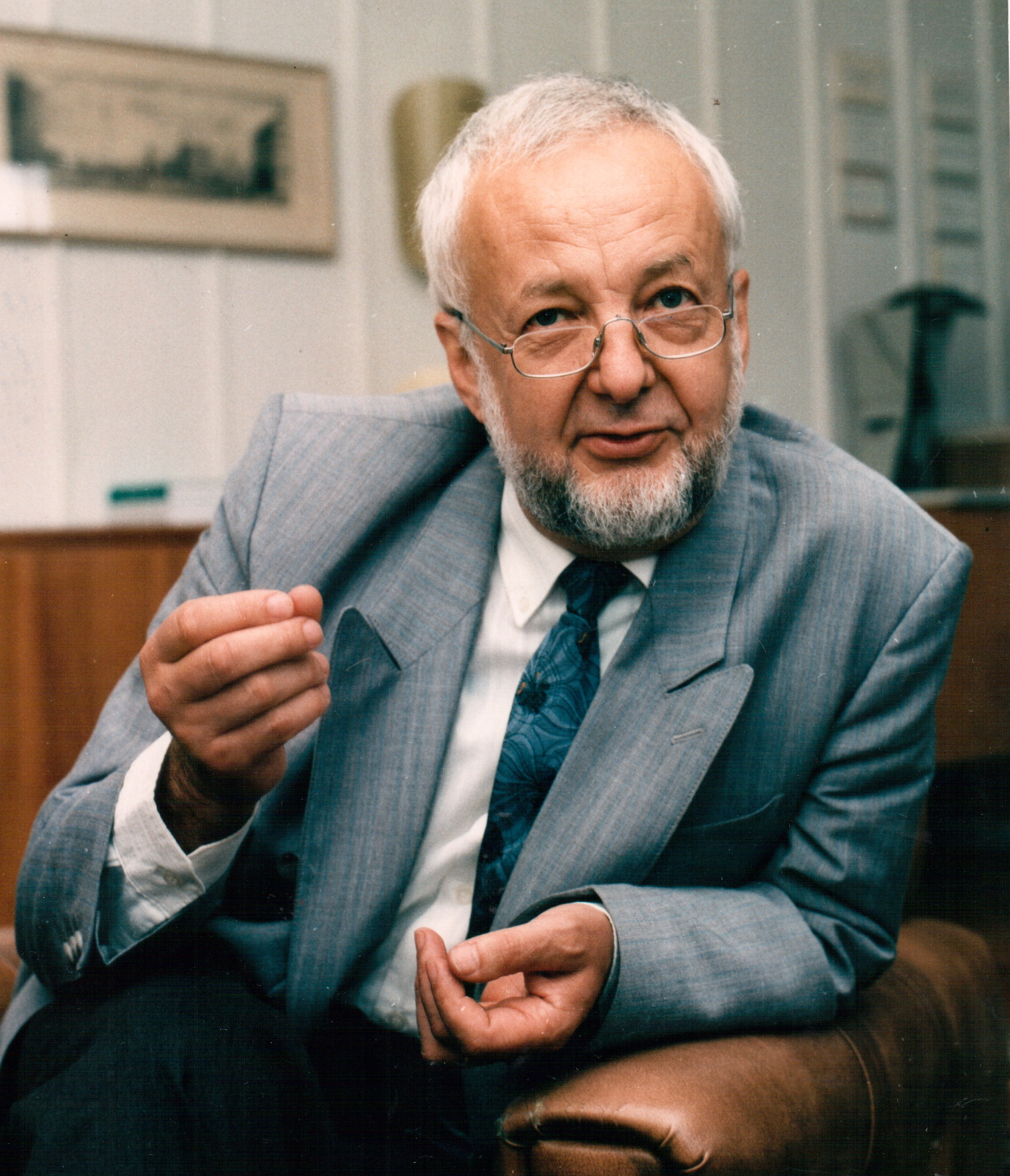

Peter Oehme (born 5 June 1937) is a German physician and pharmacologist. In 1977 he founded the East German Drugs Research Institute, serving as its director from January 1977 till December 1991 when the institute was reconfigured in the context of German reunification.

== Life ==
Peter Oehme was born in Leipzig. During the war years Leipzig was subject to heavy air-raids and he was evacuated, with his mother, to a village in Saxony. US troops invaded and then withdrew from the area in the summer of 1945, reflecting an agreement already concluded between the leaders of the victorious powers, which left the entire region administered as the Soviet occupation zone (relaunched in October 1949 as the Soviet sponsored German Democratic Republic). After the war ended the family were reunited in Leipzig, but while he was still at school they relocated to what came to be known as East Berlin. His memoires recall that his parents were enthusiastic supporters of the new political structure in East Germany, although Oehme himself displayed outbursts of low-level rebelliousness, notably in the aftermath of the Hungarian uprising, when he was one of a group of medical student representatives demanding the abolition of compulsory lessons in the Russian language and Marxist-Leninist basic studies.

Between 1955 and 1961 he studied Medicine at the Humboldt University of Berlin. It was here that he received his doctorate in 1962. Oehme launched his research career under the direction of Friedrich Jung at the (East) German Pharmacology Institute ("Institut für Pharmakologie" / DAW) in Buch (Berlin). It was as a result of a conversation with Friedrich Jung that he toned down his expressions of political dissent, concentrating instead on his studies and research work. He switched, in 1967 to the Charité (university hospital), receiving his habilitation (higher academic qualification) for a piece of work on Neuropharmacology.

As a result of his work he was in regular contact with academic colleagues in Prague, briefly visiting Czechoslovakia early in 1968 while accompanying students on an exchange visit. Impressed by the democratic stirrings in Czechoslovakia, on returning home he registered as a candidate for membership of East Germany's ruling Socialist Unity Party ("Sozialistische Einheitspartei Deutschlands" / SED). He was deeply disappointed when Soviet tanks rolled into Prague in August of the same year, and by the ensuing "normalisation" process, but he nevertheless avoided any significant falling out with the authorities at home. In 1969 Oehme was appointed deputy director at the Research Centre for Molecular Biology and Medicine, the Association of Biosciences and Medical Support at the (East) German Academy of Sciences, where he had been a research assistant since 1967. During this period he was also teaching at the Humboldt. In 1970 he was appointed Professor for Experimental Pharmacology and a section head at the Academy. In 1974 he became deputy director at the Academy's National Institute for Molecular Biology.

The East German Drugs Reseatch Institute was launched at Oehme's instigation in 1976. It operated under the auspices of the (East) German Academy of Sciences, and between 1977 and 1991 Prof. Dr. Peter Oehme served as its first (and only) director. His objective with the institute was to make Berlin - initially East Berlin - a world centre for drugs research and by some criteria he succeeded in this. In 1992 the Institute re-emerged as the Leibniz Institute for Molecular Pharmacology ("Leibniz-Institut für Molekulare Pharmakologie"). In 2016 Oehme retained his connections with it, contributing his services as a research group leader and project group leader. He also took on teaching contracts at the University of Potsdam and at the Humboldt.

== Work ==
One focus of Peter Oehme's research work has involved the origins of stress reactions, and their relationships with stress and drug dependency. In particular, he has engaged with the operation of the neuropeptide Substance P in the stress response and the body's adaptation.

== Recognition and honours ==
- 1985 Corresponding member of the (East) German Academy of Sciences
- 1988 External member of the Soviet Academy of Medical Sciences (since 1992 the Russian Academy of Medical Sciences)
- 1988 Awarded National Prize of the German Democratic Republic Class II (Sciences and technology)
- 1990 Full member of the (East) German Academy of Sciences
- 2014 External member of the Russian Academy of Sciences
