= Grevesmühlen =

Town in Mecklenburg-Vorpommern, Germany

- Town
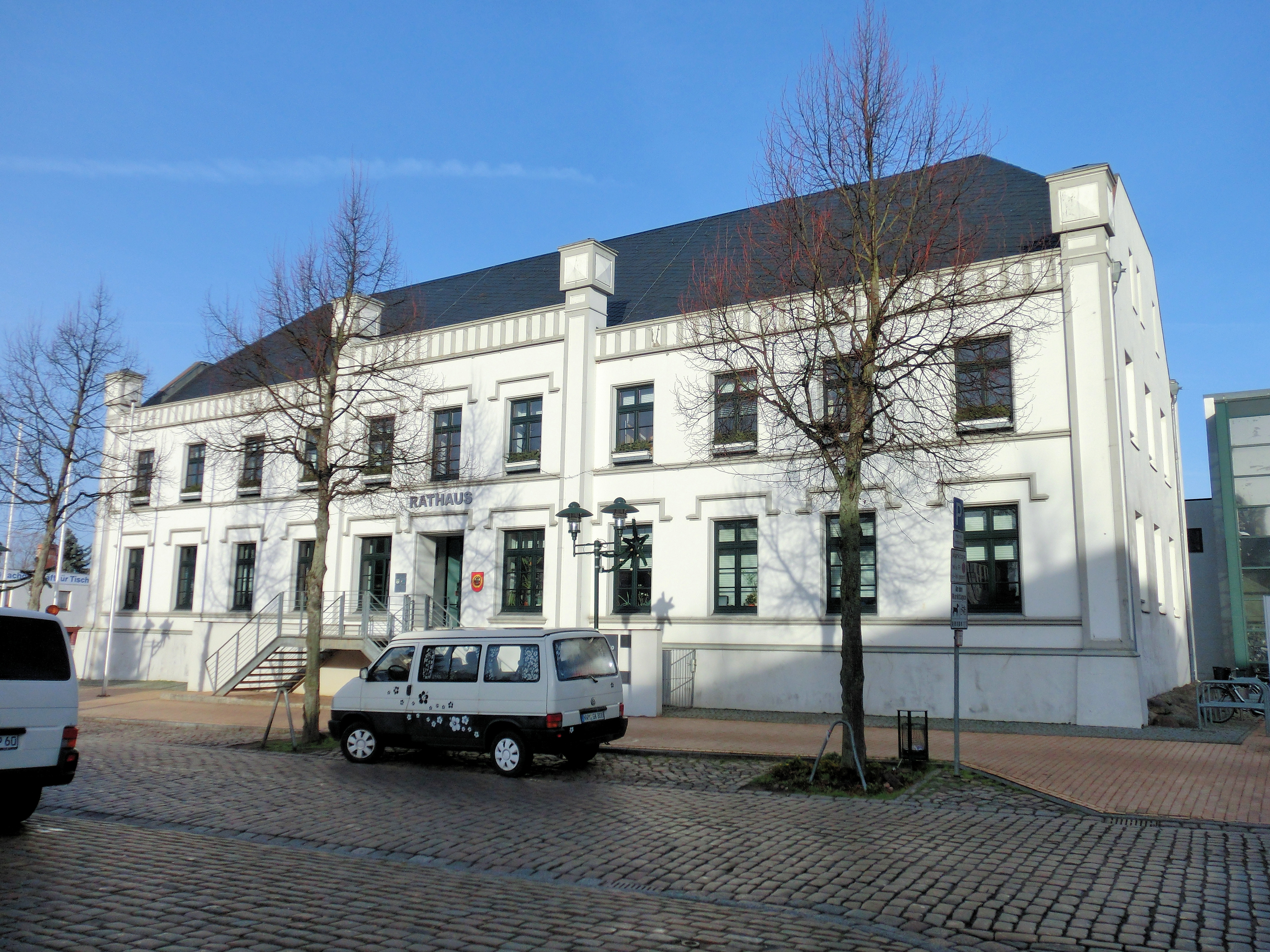
- Town hall

- Flag Coat of arms

- Location of Grevesmühlen within Nordwestmecklenburg district
- Interactive map of Grevesmühlen
- Location within Germany Location within Mecklenburg-Vorpommern
- Coordinates: 53°52′N 11°10′E
- Country: Germany
- State: Mecklenburg-Vorpommern
- District: Nordwestmecklenburg

Government
  - Mayor: Jürgen Ditz

Area
  - Total: 52.38 km^{2} (20.22 sq mi)
- Elevation: 40 m (130 ft)

Population (2025-12-31)
  - Total: 10,082
  - Density: 192.5/km^{2} (498.5/sq mi)
- Time zone: UTC+01:00 (CET)
  - Summer (DST): UTC+02:00 (CEST)
- Postal codes: 23936
- Dialling codes: 03881
- Vehicle registration: NWM
- Website: www.grevesmuehlen.de

Grevesmühlen (German pronunciation: [ɡʁeːvəsˈmyːlən]) is a municipality in Mecklenburg-Vorpommern, northern Germany. It was the seat of the Nordwestmecklenburg district until 2011, when Wismar became the seat. It is situated 33 km east of Lübeck, and 29 km northwest of Schwerin. It is part of the Hamburg Metropolitan Region.

== History ==
The name Grevesmühlen goes back as far as 1226, which makes it one of the oldest towns in Mecklenburg-Vorpommern.

== Twin towns – sister cities ==
Grevesmühlen is twinned with:

- Ahrensbök, Germany (1992)
- Ichnia, Ukraine (2025)
- Laxå, Sweden (2004)
- Nagymaros, Hungary (2014)

== Notable people ==
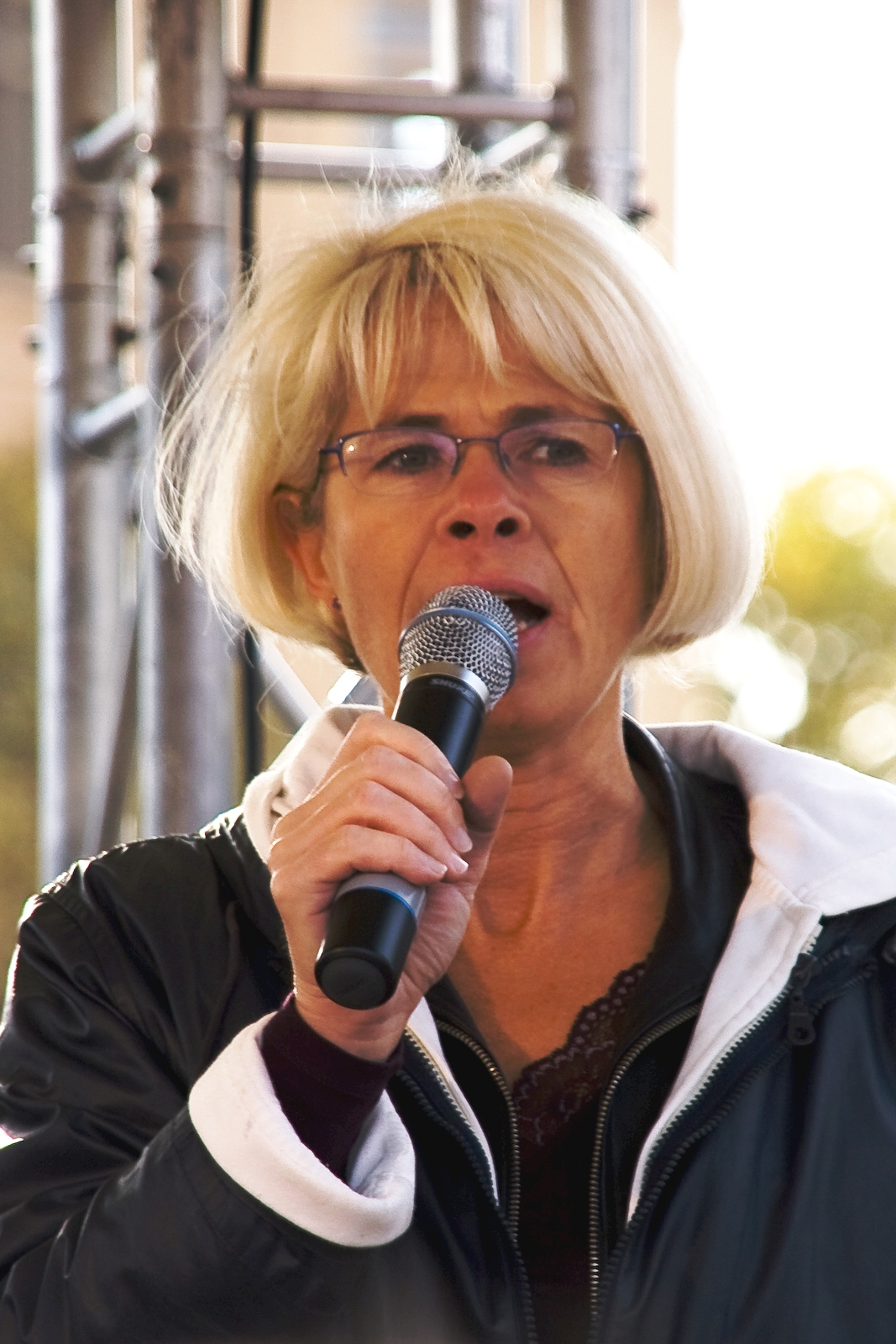
Angelika Gramkow, 2008

- Ludwig Gotthard Kosegarten (1758–1818), a German poet and Lutheran preacher.
- Wilhelm Neumann (1849–1919), a Baltic German architect and art historian.
- Rudolph Karstadt (1856–1944), entrepreneur, owned Karstadt Warenhaus AG
- Manfred W. Jürgens (born 1956), painter and photographer.
- Angelika Gramkow (born 1958), politician, Lord mayor of Schwerin

=== Sport ===
- Timo Lange (born 1968), football coach and a former player; played 440 games
- Astrid Kumbernuss (born 1970), female shot putter; bronze and gold medallist at the 1996 & 2000 Summer Olympics
- Jens Voigt (born 1971), former road bicycle racer
- Carsten Jancker (born 1974), football coach and former player; played 324 games and 33 for Germany
