= Gunther Kohlmey =

German economist (1913–1999)

Günther Kohlmey (27 July 1913 – 25 December 1999) was one of the leading economists in East Germany.

== Life ==
Born in Berlin, Kohlmey became a professor at the German Academy of State and Law in 1949. He directed the Institute of Economics at the German Academy of Sciences at Berlin from 1953 to 1958, and headed the institute's division on the political economy of socialism.

In 1955 he won the National Prize of East Germany.

== Works ==
- Der demokratische Weltmarkt (The democratic world-market), Berlin, 1955
- Das Geldsystem der Deutschen Demokratischen Republik (The monetary system of the German Democratic Republic), Berlin, 1956
- Entwicklungsprobleme des sozialistischen Weltwirtschaftssystems (Development problems for the socialist world economic system), Berlin, 1958
- Vergesellschaftung und Integration im Sozialismus (Socialization and integration in socialism), Berlin, 1973
- Moderne Produktion und Arbeitswerttheorie (Modern production and the labour theory of value), Berlin, 1986
