= 2002 Mecklenburg-Vorpommern state election =

German state election

- 22 September 2002

All 71 seats in the Landtag of Mecklenburg-Vorpommern 36 seats needed for a majority
- Turnout: 970,031 (70.6%) ▼8.6%
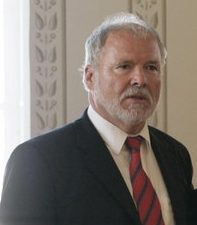

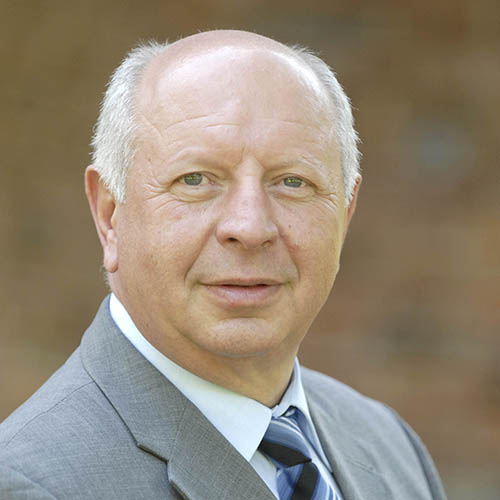

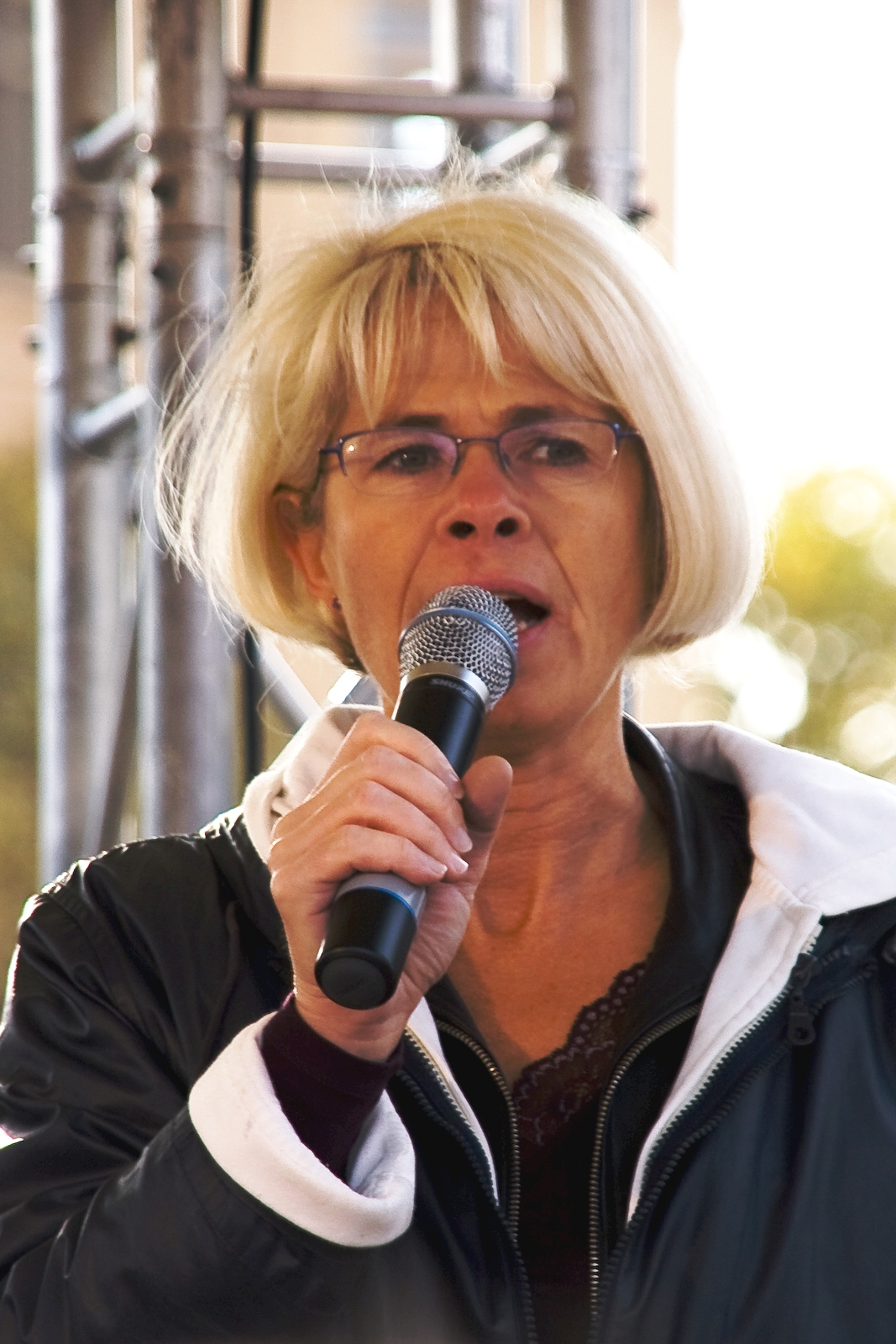
	First party	Second party	Third party
Leader	Harald Ringstorff	Eckhardt Rehberg	Angelika Gramkow
Party	SPD	CDU	PDS
Last election	27 seats, 34.3%	24 seats, 30.2%	20 seats, 24.4%
Seats won	33	25	13
Seat change	▲6	▲1	▼7
Popular vote	394,118	304,125	159,065
Percentage	40.6%	31.4%	16.4%
Swing	▲6.3%	▲1.2%	▼8.0%
- Results for the single-member constituencies
Minister-President before election
Harald Ringstorff
SPD
Elected Minister-President
Harald Ringstorff
SPD

The 2002 Mecklenburg-Vorpommern state election was held on 22 September 2002 to elect the members of the 4th Landtag of Mecklenburg-Vorpommern. It was held on the same day as the 2002 federal election. The incumbent coalition government of the Social Democratic Party (SPD) and Party of Democratic Socialism (PDS) led by Minister-President Harald Ringstorff retained its majority and continued in office.

== Campaign and issues ==
The election was the first time that a "red-red" SPD–PDS government faced an election. It was held at the same day as the 2002 federal election, and the campaigns of the state parties were highly influenced by the issues in the federal politics.

== Parties ==
The table below lists parties represented in the 3rd Landtag of Mecklenburg-Vorpommern.

Name		Ideology	Leader(s)	1998 result	
Name		Ideology	Leader(s)	Votes (%)	Seats
SPD	Social Democratic Party of Germany; Sozialdemokratische Partei Deutschlands	Social democracy	Harald Ringstorff	34.3%	27 / 71
CDU	Christian Democratic Union of Germany; Christlich Demokratische Union Deutschlands	Christian democracy	Eckhardt Rehberg	30.2%	24 / 71
PDS	Party of Democratic Socialism; Partei des Demokratischen Sozialismus	Democratic socialism	Angelika Gramkow	24.4%	20 / 71

== Opinion polling ==
Polling firm	Fieldwork date	Sample size	SPD	CDU	PDS	Grüne	FDP	Others	Lead
2002 state election	22 Sep 2002	–	40.6	31.4	16.4	2.6	3.7	4.3	9.2
Emnid	16 Sep 2002	?	37	33	19	3	3	5	4
Infratest dimap	12 Sep 2002	1,000	40	33	17	2	4	4	7
Emnid	9 Sep 2002	?	37	34	18	3	4	4	3
Infratest dimap	4 Sep 2002	?	37	35	18.5	2	4.5	3	2
Emnid	2 Sep 2002	750	37	36	17	3	3	4	1
Forschungsgruppe Wahlen	1 Sep 2002	1,000	38	33	18	4	4	3	5
Infratest dimap	28 Aug 2002	1,000	36	33	20	2	4	5	3
Emnid	26 Aug 2002	?	35	38	15	3	4	5	3
Emnid	19 Aug 2002	?	32	38	18	3	5	4	6
Emnid	12 Aug 2002	?	33	39	18	3	5	2	6
Emnid	2 Aug 2002	750	32	39	19	3	5	2	7
Infratest dimap	3 Jul 2002	?	35	36	20	1	5	3	1
Emnid	22 Jun 2002	?	30	38	18	3	7	4	8
Emnid	23 May 2002	?	30	41	19	1	4	5	11
Emnid	29 Jan 2002	?	32	39	17	1	3	8	7
Infratest dimap	24 Jan 2002	?	29	37	23	2	3	6	8
Emnid	3 Nov 2001	?	32	32	24	3	4	5	Tie
Emnid	16 May 2001	?	32	35	21	3	5	4	3
Infratest dimap	18–24 Sep 2000	1,000	32	36	24	–	–	?	4
Emnid	13–18 Sep 1999	750	26	42	24	–	–	?	16
Infratest dimap	11–21 Feb 1999	912	38	37	17	–	–	8	1
1998 state election	27 Sep 1998	–	34.3	30.2	24.4	2.7	1.6	6.8	4.1

== Election result ==
Summary of the 22 September 2002 election results for the Landtag of Mecklenburg-Vorpommern
Party	Votes	%	+/-	Seats	+/-	Seats %
Social Democratic Party (SPD)	394,118	40.6	▲6.3	33	▲6	46.5
Christian Democratic Union (CDU)	304,125	31.4	▲1.2	25	▲1	35.2
Party of Democratic Socialism (PDS)	159,065	16.4	▼8.0	13	▼7	18.3
Free Democratic Party (FDP)	45,676	4.7	▲3.1	0	±0	0
Alliance 90/The Greens (Grüne)	25,402	2.6	▼0.1	0	±0	0
Party for a Rule of Law Offensive (Schill party)	16,483	1.7	New	0	New	0
Others	25,162	2.6		0	±0	0
Total	970,031	100.0		71	±0	
Voter turnout		70.6	▼8.6			

Popular Vote
SPD	40.63%
CDU	31.35%
PDS	16.40%
FDP	4.71%
GRÜNE	2.62%
Other	4.29%

Landtag seats
SPD	46.48%
CDU	35.21%
PDS	18.31%

== Sources ==
- The Federal Returning Officer
