= Zschiesche =

Zschiesche is a German language surname. Notable people with the name include:

- Karl-Wolfgang Zschiesche (1933–1996), German physician and pathologist
- Werner Zschiesche (1903–1974), German rower
