= Antagonise =

Studio album by MaYaN
- Released: January 31, 2014
- Recorded: 2013 at Sandlane Recording Facilities, Rijen, the Netherlands
- Genre: Symphonic death metal Melodic death metal
- Length: 64:50
- Label: Nuclear Blast
- Producer: Joost van den Broek

MaYaN chronology
Quarterpast (2011)	Antagonise (2014)	Dhyana (2018)

Professional ratings
Review scores
Source	Rating
Jukebox:Metal	3.5/5 stars

Antagonise is the second album by Dutch metal supergroup MaYaN. It was released on January 31, 2014. The 11-song CD, recorded at the Sandlane studio with producer Joost van den Broek, features guest appearances by Floor Jansen, and future band member Marcela Bovio.

The cover artwork for "Antagonise" was created by Stefan Heilemann, who previously worked on MaYaN's debut album, Quarterpast.

== Track listing ==
All lyrics are written by Mark Jansen except "Insano" by Laura Macrì; all music is composed by Jansen, Frank Schiphorst, and Jack Driessen, except "Descry" by Driessen, "Bloodline Forfeit" by Jansen, Schiphorst, Driessen, and Rob van der Loo, and "Devil in Disguise" by Jansen, Schiphorst, Driessen, and Sander Gommans.

No.	Title	Length
1.	"Descry" (Bonus track)	2:14
2.	"Bloodline Forfeit"	4:15
3.	"Burn Your Witches"	5:39
4.	"Redemption" (The Democracy Illusion)	6:07
5.	"Paladins of Deceit" (National Security Extremism – Part 1)	6:16
6.	"Lone Wolf"	5:54
7.	"Devil in Disguise"	4:59
8.	"Insano"	2:57
9.	"Human Sacrifice"	6:10
10.	"Enemies of Freedom"	7:09
11.	"Capital Punishment"	4:41
12.	"Faceless Spies" (National Security Extremism – Part 2)	8:09
Total length:		64:50

== Personnel ==
Band members

- Mark Jansen – death growls, screams and orchestration
- Henning Basse – vocals
- Laura Macrì – vocals
- Frank Schiphorst – guitars
- Rob van der Loo – bass
- Jack Driessen – keyboards, screams, orchestral arrangements
- Ariën van Weesenbeek – drums, grunts

=== Guest/session musicians ===
- Floor Jansen – lead vocals on tracks 3 & 4
- Marcela Bovio – lead vocals on tracks 2, 7 & 9, choir
- Dimitris Katsoulis – Virtuoso Violin

== Links ==
- Official lyrical music video of "Faceless Spies" on YouTube
