= Mayan (band) =

Dutch symphonic death metal band

MaYaN
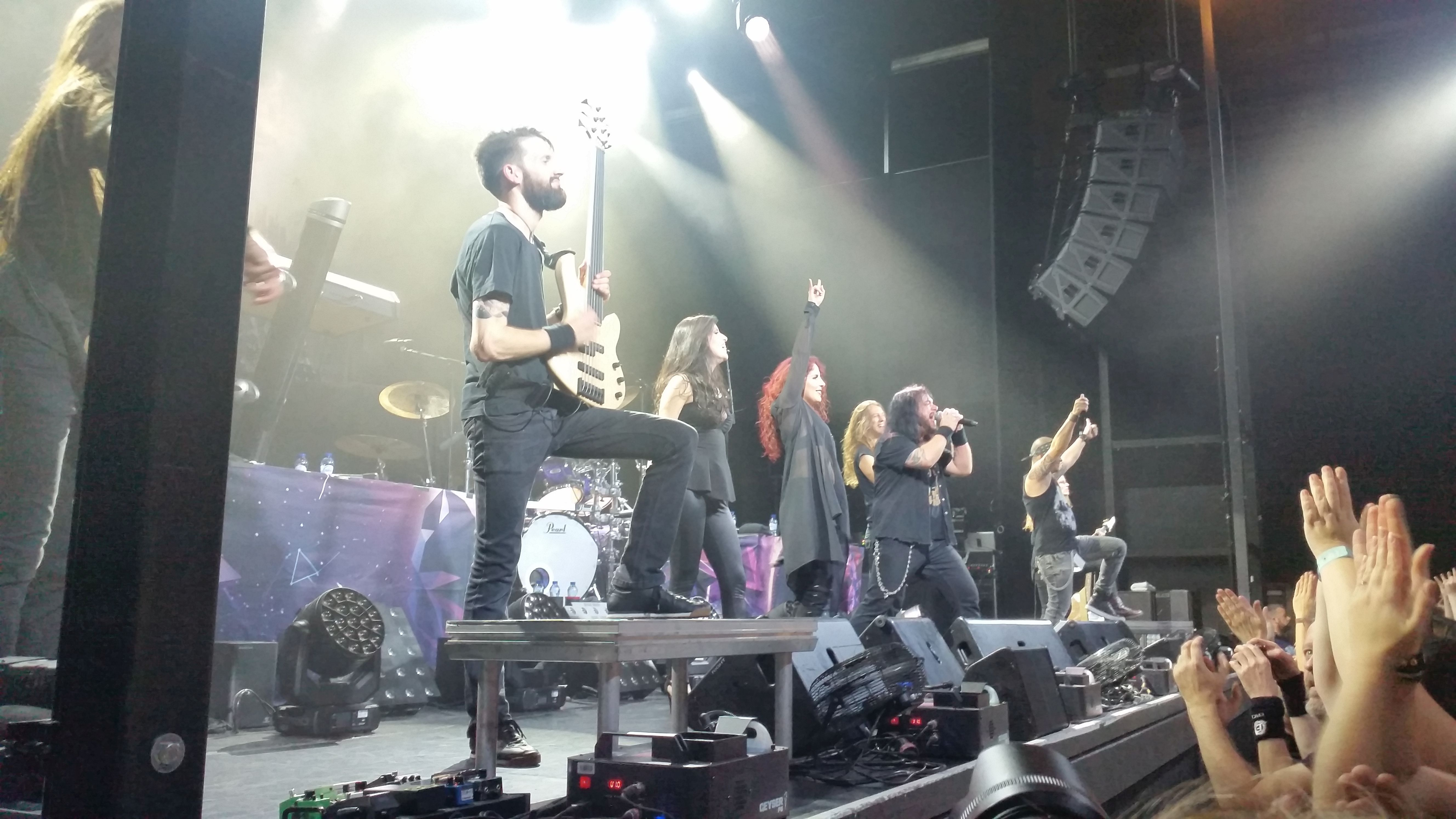
- MaYaN performing at Het Depot in Leuven, Belgium, 2017

Background information
- Origin: Netherlands
- Genres: Symphonic death metal Melodic death metal
- Years active: 2010–present
- Label: Nuclear Blast
- Members: Mark Jansen; Ariën van Weesenbeek; Frank Schiphorst; Laura Macrì; George Oosthoek; Roel Käller; Marcela Bovio; Adam Denlinger
- Past members: Isaac Delahaye; Sander Gommans; Rob van der Loo; Henning Basse; Jack Driessen; Merel Bechtold
- Website: mayanofficial.com

Mayan (stylized as MaYaN) is a Dutch symphonic death metal band founded by vocalist Mark Jansen, guitarist Frank Schiphorst, and keyboardist Jack Driessen. The band features many different vocalists (either full-time members or guests) in a mix of clean vocals, growled vocals, and screams, supported by an instrumentation combining both heavy metal and symphonic metal elements.

Created in 2010, the band has released three studio albums to date, Quarterpast in 2011, Antagonise in 2014 and Dhyana in 2018. The name was chosen by Jansen out of his fascination for the ancient Maya civilization. Lyrical themes include religion, politics, and world events, as well as philosophy, meditation, existence, and inner struggles.

== History ==
On 6 September 2013, Nuclear Blast released a press statement that confirmed that Laura Macrì and Henning Basse, who were guest and tour members for the first album, have become full-time members.

In October 2013, Isaac Delahaye left Mayan to focus on other projects.

On 16 December, the band announced Merel Bechtold as Delahaye's successor for the upcoming two release shows of new album in late January 2014. After these shows, she was made a permanent member.

In 2015, Rob van der Loo left the band to focus on Epica and an upcoming new project. Roel Käller took his place as the bassist. Next to that, George Oosthoek (ex-Orphanage) joined the band as growling vocalist. On 21 June 2017, it was announced that Marcela Bovio, former singer of Stream of Passion and a regular collaborator of the band since 2013, was now a full-time member.

Vocalist Henning Basse departed the band on July 31, 2018, citing scheduling conflicts, while remaining a recurring guest. Adam Denlinger, who started touring with a band in 2017, became the new clean vocalist.

On 27 July 2018, MaYaN announced the third album, Dhyana, which was released on 21 September 2018.

On 16 July 2022, MaYaN announced their tenth-anniversary show, which took place on 8 September 2022 in Eindhoven.

== Band members ==
Current

- Mark Jansen – growled and screamed vocals (2010–present)
- Frank Schiphorst – guitars (2010–present)
- Ariën van Weesenbeek – drums, growled vocals (2010–present)
- Laura Macrì – clean vocals (2013–present; session: 2011–2013)
- George Oosthoek – growled vocals (2016–present)
- Roel Käller – fretless bass (2016–present)
- Marcela Bovio – clean vocals (2017–present; session: 2013–2017)
- Adam Denlinger – clean vocals (2018–present; session: 2017)
- Roberto Macrì – keyboards (2019–present)

Former

- Jack Driessen – keyboards, screamed vocals (2010–2019)
- Sander Gommans – guitars (2010)
- Isaac Delahaye – guitars (2010–2013)
- Rob van der Loo – fretted bass (2011–2015)
- Merel Bechtold – guitars (2013–2023)

Session

- Floor Jansen – clean vocals (2011–2014)
- Simone Simons – clean vocals (2011)
- Jeroen Paul Thesseling – fretless bass (2010–2011)
- Henning Basse – clean vocals (2011–2013, 2018–present); full time member: 2013–2018)
- Arjan Rijnen – live guitars (2018–present)

== Discography ==
=== Studio albums ===
- Quarterpast (2011)
- Antagonise (2014)
- Dhyana (2018)

=== Singles & EPs ===
- Undercurrent (EP, 2018)
- Metal Night at the Opera (EP, 2018)
- The Rhythm of Freedom (single, 2018)
