= Quarterpast =

Studio album by MaYaN
- Released: 20 May 2011
- Recorded: Gate Studios, Wolfsburg, Germany, 18 October 2010 - 15 January 2011
- Genre: Symphonic death metal, melodic death metal
- Length: 59:13
- Label: Nuclear Blast
- Producer: Sascha Paeth; MaYaN

MaYaN chronology
Quarterpast (2011)	Antagonise (2014)

Quarterpast is the debut album by Dutch metal supergroup MaYaN. It was released on 20 May 2011 in Europe. The title Quarterpast was suggested by a fan as part of a competition to decide the band's name, but was eventually used as the album title when the band decided to name themselves MaYaN.

== Reception ==
The album only received 6 out of 10 from Rock Hard, but landed an 8 out of 10 in Metal.de and 8.5 in Powermetal.de.

== Track listing ==
All lyrics are written by Mark Jansen except "Essenza di Te" by Laura Macrì and "Sinner's Last Retreat" by Jansen and Johanna Najla Fakhry.; all music is composed by MaYaN except "Bite the Bullet" which is by MaYaN & Sander Gommans.

No.	Title	Length
1.	"Symphony of Aggression"	7:49
2.	"Mainstay of Society" (In the Eyes of the Law: Corruption)	5:25
3.	"Quarterpast"	1:35
4.	"Course of Life"	6:10
5.	"The Savage Massacre" (In the Eyes of the Law: Pizzo)	5:28
6.	"Essenza di Te" (Essence of You)	2:06
7.	"Bite the Bullet"	5:19
8.	"Drown the Demon"	5:00
9.	"Celibate Aphrodite"	7:20
10.	"War on Terror" (In the Eyes of the Law: Pentagon Papers)	4:25
11.	"Tithe"	0:52
12.	"Sinner's Last Retreat" (Bonus track)	7:39
Total length:		59:13

== Personnel ==
Band members

- Mark Jansen – death growls, screams, orchestral and lyrical arrangements
- Jack Driessen – keyboards, screams, orchestral arrangements
- Frank Schiphorst – guitars
- Isaac Delahaye – guitars
- Jeroen Paul Thesseling – fretless bass
- Ariën van Weesenbeek – drums

Guest/session musicians

- Floor Jansen - vocals on "Symphony of Aggression", "Course of Life", "Bite the Bullet", "Drown the Demon" and "Sinner's Last Retreat"
- Simone Simons - vocals on "Symphony of Aggression", "Mainstay of Society", "Bite the Bullet", "Drown the Demon" and "Sinner's Last Retreat"
- Henning Basse - vocals on "Symphony of Aggression", "Course of Life", "The Savage Massacre", "Bite the Bullet", "Celibate Aphrodite" and "Sinner's Last Retreat"
- Laura Macrì - vocals on "The Savage Massacre", "Essenza di Te" and "Celibate Aphrodite"
- Amanda Somerville - spoken word on "Symphony of Aggression", lyrics editing
- Trinity Boys Choir - choir on "Quarterpast", arranged by Coen Janssen
- MaYaN Choir:
  - Simone Simons, Floor Jansen, Laura Macrì - soprano and alto
  - Henning Basse, Simon Oberender - tenor and bass

Production

- Sascha Paeth - producer, engineer, mixing, mastering
- Simon Oberender, Olaf Reitmeier - engineers
