= Simone Simons =

Dutch singer (born 1985)

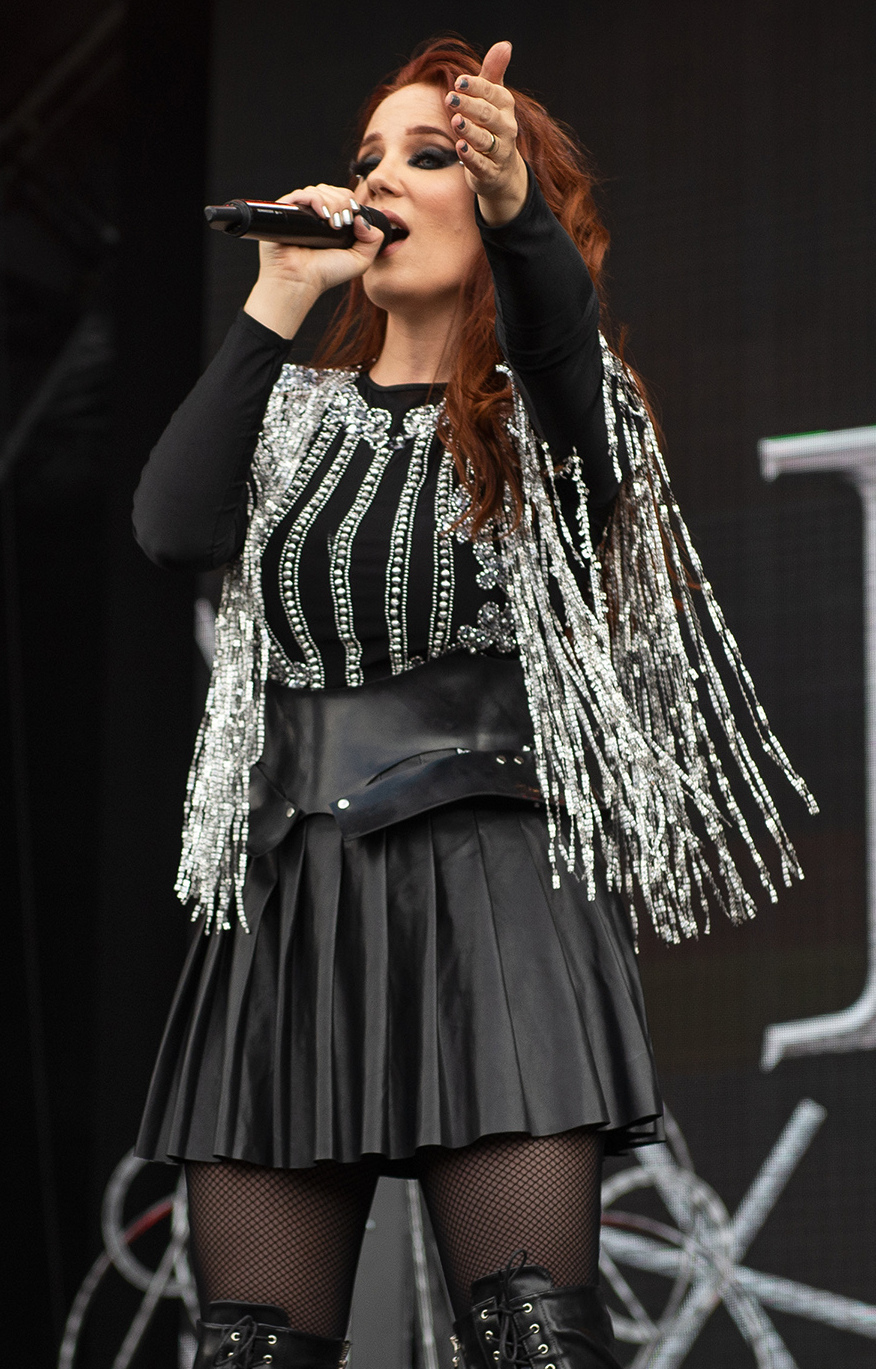
- Simons with Epica live at Hellfest 2022

Background information
- Born: Simone Johanna Maria Simons; 17 January 1985 (age 41); Hoensbroek, Limburg, Netherlands
- Genres: Symphonic metal, classical, progressive metal
- Occupations: Singer, songwriter
- Years active: 2002–present
- Member of: Epica
- Spouse: Oliver Palotai (m. 2013)
- Website: Epica Official Blog Personal Website

Simone Johanna Maria Simons (born 17 January 1985) is a Dutch singer. She is best known for being the lead singer of Dutch symphonic metal band Epica, which she joined at the age of seventeen, releasing nine studio albums and touring the world. In her singing career, she has also collaborated with bands such as Kamelot, Leaves' Eyes, Primal Fear, Ayreon, and Angra. She also has a side pursuit as a lifestyle blogger, via her website SmoonStyle.

== Early life ==
Simons was born in Hoensbroek, Heerlen, near the border with Germany and Belgium. She has a younger sister named Janneke who was born on Simone's second birthday. Her earliest musical interests included singing along to Disney movies as a young child, as well as pop acts such as the Spice Girls, Backstreet Boys, Whitney Houston whose songs she performed in a primary-school musical around age 12. At age 10 she started taking singing lessons and also began flute lessons (which she continued for two years), later joining a music school at age 12. At age 15 she switched from pop/jazz singing lessons to study as a lyrical singer, becoming also interested in classical music and composition, after listening to Nightwish's second album Oceanborn and hearing Tarja Turunen's voice for the first time. In her teenage years she first gravitated toward alternative rock bands Radiohead, Silverchair, Muse, Deftones, R.E.M. and Garbage before discovering black metal Cradle of Filth and Dimmu Borgir through her first boyfriend; at one point she was invited to join a black-metal band rehearsal and did so, although she was a little afraid to sing. Simons sang in a choir for a few months, and later joined Epica at the age of 17, after meeting Mark Jansen through the After Forever's blog and fanclub.

Simons cited her musical influences as Lacuna Coil, Nightwish, Tristania, Kamelot, Within Temptation, Dimmu Borgir, Tiamat, and some classical music such as Wolfgang Amadeus Mozart.

== Epica ==
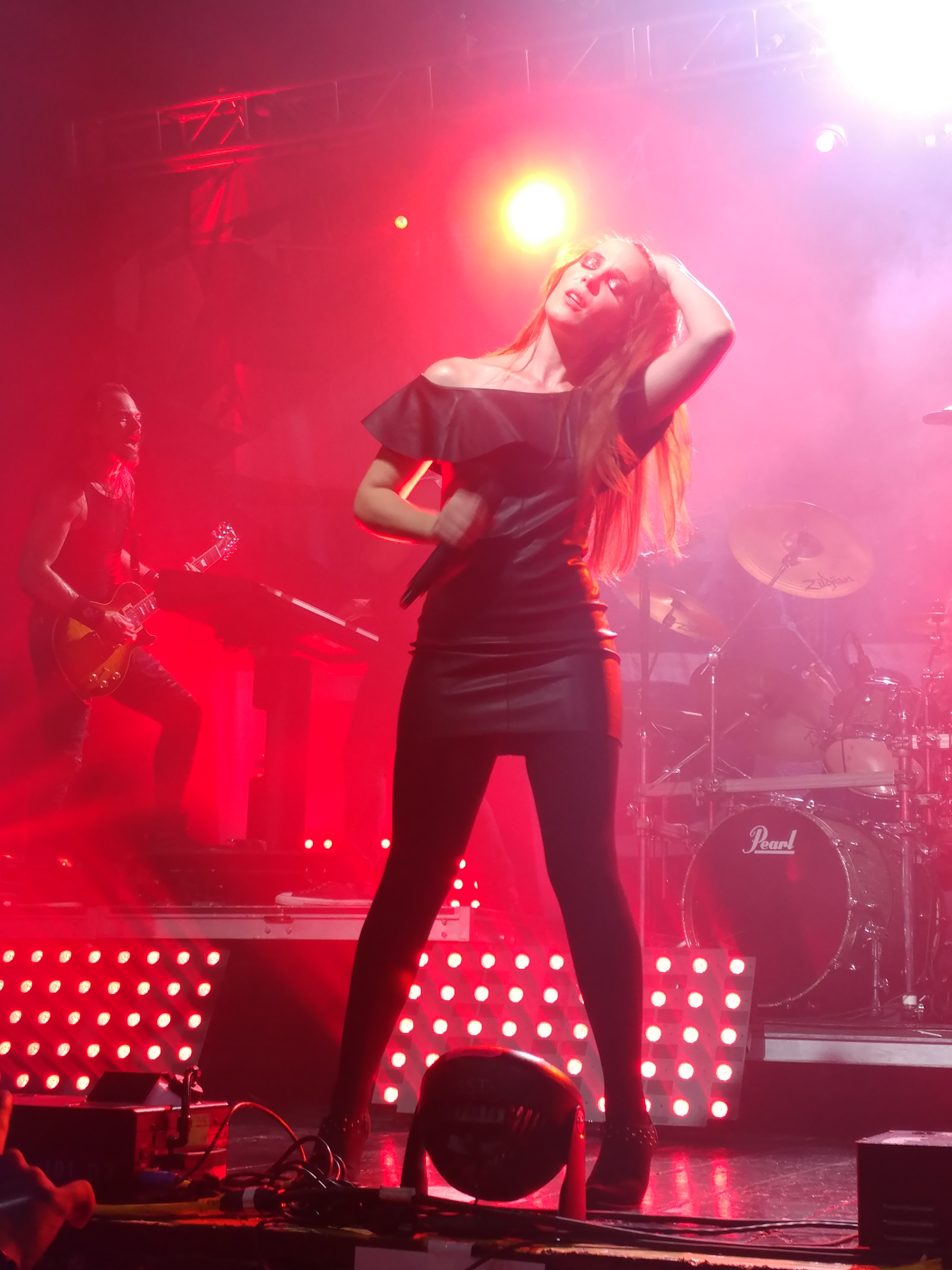
Simons performing with Epica live @ Revolution Live, Ft. Lauderdale

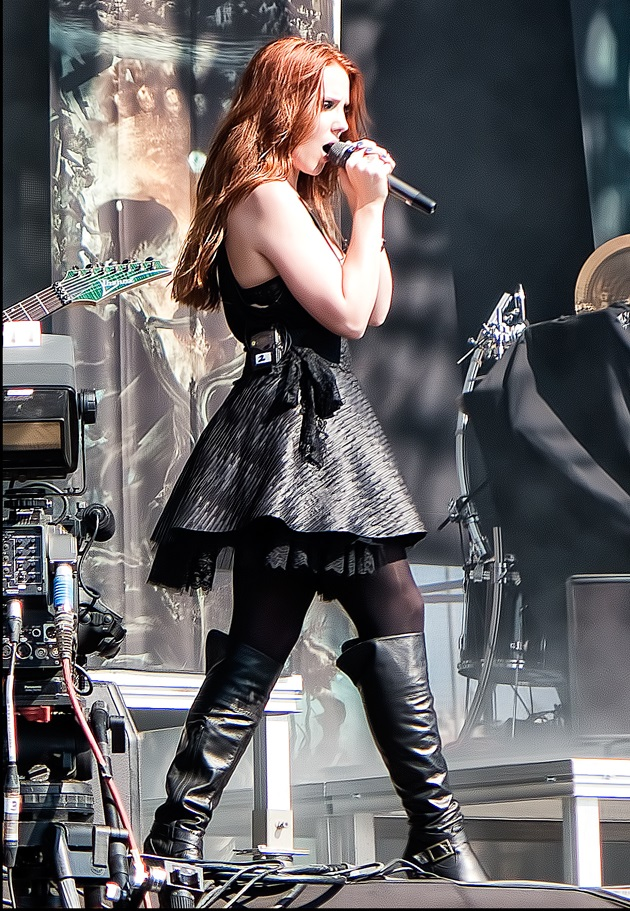
Simons performing with Epica in 2014

In early 2002, Mark Jansen left After Forever over creative differences. He then began looking for musicians who would work towards a more classical/symphonic type of music project; this was initially named "Sahara Dust". In late 2002, the band courted Helena Iren Michaelsen (from Trail of Tears) as its frontwoman, but shortly after she was replaced by the then unknown Simons, who was Jansen's girlfriend at the time.

== Personal life ==
In January 2008, Simons was suffering from recurrent MRSA infections. This forced Epica to cancel many of their shows. In February, her condition improved, but she had not completely recovered. In March, Epica toured with Amanda Somerville, replacing Simons for their United States tour until 11 May 2008, when Simons performed again at their show in Bibelot, Dordrecht.

Asked about her looks as one of the factors that attract attention to Epica, Simons said: "First of all the most important is the sound of the band, because beauty will fade one day, and I hope my voice won't [Laughs]... But, yeah, you have two aspects of the band – the music (the CDs) and then the live side of it (the show), and part of the show is also that it has to look nice, so I take good care of myself, I make sure that the fans have something to look at during the show."

Simons and long-time partner, Kamelot keyboard player Oliver Palotai have a son, Vincent Palotai, born on 2 October 2013. In December 2013, Simons announced on her blog that she had recently married Palotai. They reside in Stuttgart, Germany. In the past, she had a relationship with Mark Jansen; the relationship ended in 2005, shortly after the release of Consign to Oblivion. Simons first met Jansen in the chatroom on After Forever's website, when Jansen was searching for a singer for a side project, with the then-16 year old Simons making a positive impression after singing to him over the phone during their first telephone conversation.

Simons runs a blog called "SmoonStyle", where she writes about her fashion, makeup, food and experiences she has had as a member of Epica, as well as in her personal life.

== Discography ==
Studio albums:

- Vermillion (2024)

=== Guest appearances ===
- Aina – Days of Rising Doom (2003)
- Kamelot – The Black Halo in "The Haunting (Somewhere in Time)" and appears in its video (2005)
- Kamelot – One Cold Winter's Night in "The Haunting (Somewhere in Time)" (2006)
- Kamelot – Ghost Opera in "Blücher" (2007)
- Primal Fear – New Religion in "Everytime It Rains" (2007)
- Ayreon – 01011001 in "Web of Lies" (2008)
- Xystus & US Concert – Equilibrio in "Act 1 – My Song of Creation", "Act 2 – Destiny Unveiled" and "Act 2 – God of Symmetry" (2008)
- Sons of Seasons – Gods of Vermin in "Fallen Family", "Fall Of Byzanz" and "Wintersmith" (2009)
- Kamelot – Poetry for the Poisoned in "House on a Hill", "So Long", "All Is Over" (2010)
- MaYaN – Quarterpast in "Symphony of Aggression", "Mainstay of Society", "Bite the Bullet", "Drown the Demon" and "Sinner's Last Retreat" (2011)
- Sons of Seasons – Magnisphyricon in "Sanctuary" (2011)
- Avalon – Angels of the Apocalypse (2014)
- Angra – Secret Garden in "Secret Garden" (2014)
- Countermove: The Power of Love (2014) Charity single for The Red Cross, originally by Frankie Goes to Hollywood
- Leaves' Eyes – King of Kings in "Edge of Steel" (2015)
- Ayreon – The Source as "The Counselor" (2017)
- Exit Eden – Rhapsodies in Black in "Frozen" and "Skyfall" (2017)
- Tarja Turunen – Feliz Navidad in "Feliz Navidad" (2017) Charity version to help raise funds for Barbuda for Hurricane Irma relief, originally by José Feliciano
- Powerwolf – Sacred and Wild (2018) (with Epica). Featured on "The Sacrament of Sin (Deluxe Version)."
- Ayreon – Electric Castle Live and Other Tales as "The Indian" (2020)
- Ayreon – Transitus as "The Angel of Death" (2020)
- Apocalyptica – Rise Again (2022)
- Kamelot – The Awakening on "New Babylon" (2023)
- Daniel Fix – "Die schwarze Mühle - Eine Rockoper" on "Gesang der Schwäne" (2023)
- Ayreon - 01011001 - Live Beneath the Waves (2024)
- Charlotte Wessels – The Obsession on "Dopamine" (2024)

== Filmography ==
- Soaring Highs and Brutal Lows: The Voices of Women in Metal as Herself (2015)
