= Jack Driessen =

Dutch musician (born 1980)

Jack ("Jacky") Driessen
- Born: 11 July 1980 (age 46)
- Origin: Swalmen, Netherlands
- Genres: Symphonic music Symphonic metal Progressive metal Death metal
- Occupations: Musician; Songwriter
- Instrument: Keyboards
- Years active: 1995–present
- Label: Nuclear Blast
- Website: mayanofficial.com/index.php/band/jack-driessen

Jack Driessen (born 11 July 1980 in Roermond, Netherlands) is a Dutch keyboardist, songwriter and arranger. He is co-founder and former member of the Dutch symphonic death metal band MaYaN. Furthermore, he is known as the first keyboardist of the symphonic metal band After Forever (1995–2000) and as songwriter on 3 albums of the symphonic metal band Epica.

== Discography ==
=== After Forever ===
- Ephemeral (demo, 1999)
- Wings of Illusion (demo, 1999)
- Prison of Desire (2000)
- Follow in the Cry (single, 2000)
- Mea Culpa (compilation, 2006)

=== Epica ===
- Design Your Universe (2009)
- Requiem for the Indifferent (2012)
- The Quantum Enigma (2014)

=== MaYaN ===
- Quarterpast (2011)
- Antagonise (2014)
- Undercurrent (EP, 2018)
- Dhyana (2018)
