= Sons of Seasons =

German symphonic metal band

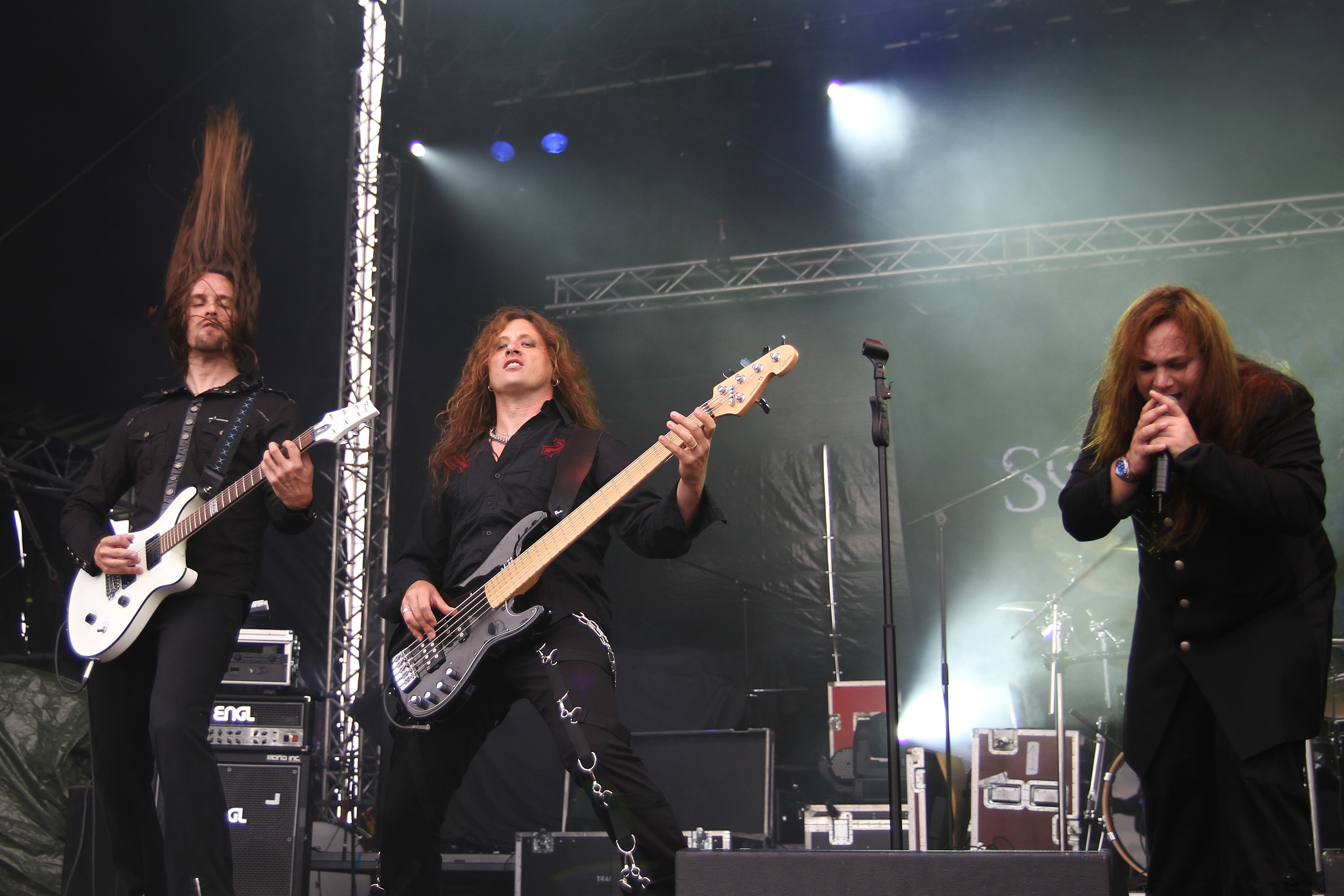

Background information
- Origin: Germany
- Genres: Progressive metal, symphonic metal
- Years active: 2007−present (on hold since 2013)
- Label: Napalm
- Members: Oliver Palotai; Jürgen Steinmetz; Daniel Schild; Pepe Pierez
- Past members: Luca Princiotta; Tijs Vanneste; Henning Basse
- Website: sonsofseasons.com

Sons of Seasons is a German symphonic metal band formed by Kamelot keyboardist Oliver Palotai. Their debut album Gods of Vermin was released in 2009, and their second album Magnisphyricon was released on April 1, 2011.

== Biography ==
The band was founded in January 2007. Up to that point, Oliver Palotai, Daniel Schild and Luca Princiotta were still members of BLAZE, the band of Iron Maiden's former singer Blaze Bayley. Disagreeing with the methods of BLAZE's new management, the whole line-up decided to quit.

The first two members to join were Princiotta and Schild, in spring 2007. The following summer, bass player Jürgen Steinmetz joined the trio.

Later that summer, Tijs Vanneste joined as a singer. However, the bands' future touring plans didn't fit his tight working schedule, thus he left.

The new and final vocalist, Henning Basse, met with Oliver Palotai during Kamelot's tour in Japan. Palotai got in contact with Basse at the end of 2007 and introduced the song material. Basse immediately saw common musical ground and started adding his ideas to the material. Luca Princiotta left the band in November 2008 following a meeting with Oliver Palotai where both parties agreed that it was in the best interest of all concerned that they'd part ways due to schedule problems. He was replaced by Pepe Pierez.

The band started touring in 2009 and released their debut album Gods of Vermin in the same year, and spent 2010 and 2011 touring with bands such as Kamelot and Rage.

On January 22, 2011, the band announced on their MySpace and website that they were to release a new album on April 1 entitled Magnisphyricon, and is according to the band "not a mere continuation of [the] chosen path, but rather a bold step into unexplored musical territories". It was released via Napalm Records.The album featured a guest appearance from Simone Simons of Epica, who also appeared on Gods of Vermin.

Sons of Seasons has been put on hold since vocalist Henning Basse's departure from the band in 2013.

== Band members ==
Current

- Oliver Palotai – keyboards, guitar (2007–present)
- Jürgen Steinmetz – bass (2007–present)
- Daniel Schild – drums (2007–present)
- Pepe Pierez – guitar (2009–present)

Former

- Tijs Vanneste – lead vocals (2007)
- Luca Princiotta – guitar (2007–2008)
- Henning Basse – lead vocals (2007–2013)

== Discography ==
=== Studio albums ===
- Gods of Vermin (2009)
- Magnisphyricon (2011)
