= Hansjürgen Matthies =

- Born: 6 March 1925; Stettin, Pomerania, Germany
- Died: 22 August 2008 (aged 83); Magdeburg, Saxony-Anhalt, Germany
- Occupations: Pharmacologist; Neuroscientist; Academy Rector
- Political party: NSDAP 1943; SED 1946
- Spouse: 2
- Children: 6

Hansjürgen Matthies (6 March 1925 – 22 August 2008) was a German pharmacologist and neuroscientist.

He served as a professor and the Institute Director at the Magdeburg Medical Academy, and was also the director of another academic institute outside the university. Colleagues describe him as "the doyen of Neuroscience in Magdeburg" and more widely in the German Democratic Republic. After the political changes of 1989/90 his work continued at the institution now remodelled as the Otto-von-Guericke University Magdeburg and the closely associated Leibnitz Institute for Neurobiology.

== Life ==
Matthies was born in Stettin in 1925. During the Second World War he was a soldier, joining the NSDAP (Nazi Party) in 1943, the year of his eighteenth birthday. Towards the end of the war he was captured by the British, and on his release he became a member of the Socialist Unity Party of Germany (Sozialistische Einheitspartei Deutschlands / SED), newly formed in April 1946 in the Soviet occupation zone within what remained of Germany. He embarked on the study of medicine, obtaining his doctorate, which he produced under the supervision of Friedrich Jung, from the Humboldt University of Berlin in 1953. He received his habilitation, a further academic qualification, in 1957.

In 1957 he took over as director (installed from 1957 till 1960 as "acting director") of the Institute for Pharmacology and Toxicology which had been recently established within the Magdeburg Medical Academy. He became a professor in 1959 and in 1960 was given a teaching professorship at The Academy. Between 1962 and 1967, and again from 1973 till 1979, he was also Rector of the Medical Academy.

In 1981 he founded the Magdeburg Institute for Neurbiology and Brain research, which he headed up as its director. During 1992/93 Magdeburg University underwent a far reaching reconfiguration, which led to its re-emergence with a new name. The Research Institute that Mattheis had founded back in the days of the German Democratic Republic re-emerged in 1991/92 as the Leibnitz Institute for Neurobiology. However, in 1990 Hansjürgen Matthies had reached his sixty-fifth birthday, and this was the year in which he formally retired from his academic responsibilities.

He died in Magdeburg in 2008.

== Work ==
Publications (not a complete list)

- 10 Jahre Medizinische Akademie Magdeburg. Magdeburg 1964
- Mathematische Modellierung von Lebensprozessen. Berlin 1972
- Neurobiologie. Jena 1977 (als Mitautor; Neuauflage München 1994)
- Medizinische Pharmakologie in zwei Bänden. München 1988
- Orotsäure: Neurobiologische und biochemische Grundlagen ihrer Wirkung. Berlin 1989

He was the author of 467 scientific publications including at least 11 substantial works. The focus of his research was on the cellular mechanisms involved in human memory functions.

== Awards and honours ==
- 1965 Patriotic Order of Merit in Bronze
- 1968 National Prize of East Germany
- 1971 Corresponding member (East) German Academy of Sciences
- 1973 Full member (East) German Academy of Sciences
- 1989 Outstanding Scientist of the People
