= Karl-Wolfgang Zschiesche =

German physician and pathologist

- Born: 14 March 1933; Merseburg, Saxony, Germany
- Died: 29 October 1996 (aged 63); Berlin, Germany
- Occupations: Physician; Pathologist

Karl-Wolfgang Zschiesche (14 March 1933 – 29 October 1996) was a German physician and pathologist.

He worked as a departmental and then divisional head at the Central Institute of Microbiology and Experimental Therapy (as it was known at the time) between 1962 and 1979. The Institute was a research institution of the German Academy of Sciences at Berlin, operating outside the country's universities sector. In 1979, he moved in to the Central Institute for Microbiology, in the Buch quarter on the north side of Berlin, serving as director of the institute between 1981 and 1984.

== Life ==
Zschiesche was born in Merseburg, an industrial town located a short distance to the south of Halle. The Nazi Party had taken power two months before he was born and the Nazi rule ended, along with the Second World War, two months after his twelfth birthday. Zschiesche attended school locally, passing his exams in 1951. Between 1951 and 1957, he studied Medicine at the nearby Martin Luther University of Halle, obtaining his doctorate in 1957. He remained at Halle for another four years, working at the university Institute for Pathology and then, for a year, at a university medical clinic.

He obtained his habilitation, a higher academic degree, in 1962, for work on the pathological anatomy of lymphatic insufficiency. It was also in 1962 that he switched to the Central Institute of Microbiology and Experimental Therapy in Jena, taking a position as leader of a working group. He remained at the Institute till 1979, heading up the Immunology Department from 1971 and the Experimental Therapy section from 1976, which was also the year in which he was appointed to a professorship.

Three years later he transferred to the Central Institute for Microbiology (Zentralinstitut für Molekularbiologie / ZIM), in the Berlin-Buch, becoming initially deputy director and then, in 1981, the director of the institute in succession to Friedrich Jung. From 1984, his ability to work began to be restricted by serious illness, and the directorship of the institute passed to the immunologist Günter Pasternak. Zschiesche nevertheless remained committed to his scientific research at the academy, working at the Centre for Vertebrate Research, headed up by Heinrich Dathe, where, until the end of the 1980s, he led a histology working group. In 1989, he also accepted an appointment as deputy chairman of the newly created Centre for Medical Research at the academy.

Even after the changes, which in October 1989 crystallised into political reunification, Zschiesche continued working at the Max Delbrück Center for Molecular Medicine (which was the successor institution to the ZIM) until shortly before his death. He died in Berlin in October 1996.

== Research ==
Research interests of Karl-Wolfgang Zschiesche included the metastasis of malignant tumours of the chest cavity, and the experimental treatment of Amyloidosis. He also worked on testing methods for antiviral drugs, cytotoxic agents and immunosuppressive drugs, as well as working on the role of cytotoxicities in immune responses. During his career he published more than 80 scientific papers and made numerous research presentations.

== Awards and honours ==
Zschiesche was made a member of the Academy of Sciences Leopoldina in 1969, and became a member of the German Academy of Sciences in 1981.
