= Jürgen Werner =

Jürgen Werner may refer to:

- Jürgen Werner (footballer, born 1935) (1935–2002), German football player
- Jürgen Werner (footballer, born 1961), Austrian football player
- Jürgen Werner (footballer, born 1967), Austrian football player
- Jürgen Werner (cyclist), German road cyclist
