= Virtuoso Violin =

Violin-playing machine

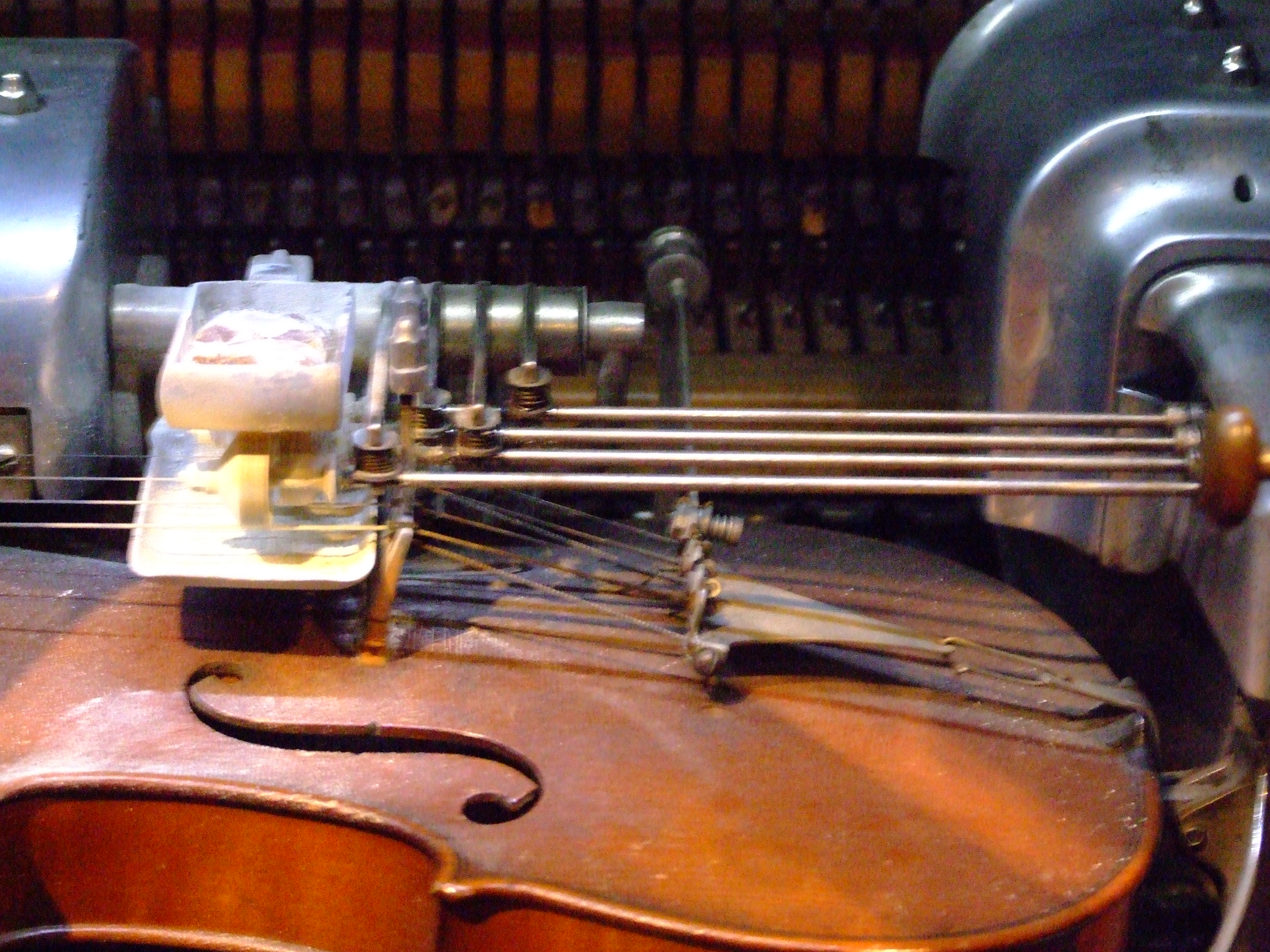
Four polished bakelite wheels spun by a 110 volt motor while a series of electromagnets "finger" the notes as a 44 note piano plays accompanent. Even the violin strings were tuned automatically.

Virtuoso Violin is a violin-playing machine, invented by Fred Paroutaud for QRS Music Technologies, the same company that produced the first MIDI-compatible player piano. It was first unveiled February 13, 1998.

== Mechanics ==
The Virtuoso uses an electromagnet instead of fingering the strings. The electromagnet's position changes the behavior of the vibrating string to attain the desired pitch.

== Compatibility ==
The Virtuoso is designed to play a real violin, although its setup requires the strings to be restrung and the bridge to be removed and replaced with a mechanical bridge which controls the string oscillation and bow movement.

The Virtuoso Violin is capable of playing standard MIDI files.

== Reception ==
The Virtuoso Violin was debuted at the Frankfurt Music Trade Show, and guests were both excited about the new invention and confused as to how it worked. The novelty of the digital-to-analog player violin has been a huge hit, and the Virtuoso Violin has been used as a replacement to the concertmaster soloist at concerts mainly for show reasons.

The price of the violin was originally estimated at under $10,000 just before its release. In 2003, its price was $12,500 and has risen since to nearly $22,000.

The sound projected by the Virtuoso Violin lacks the same quality found in a human violinist's playing, largely due to the inability for the device to spontaneously play emotionally.

== See also ==
- Mills Novelty Company Violano-Virtuoso, the first commercial violin-playing machine, circa 1911.
