= Jürgen Werner (footballer, born 1967) =

Austrian footballer

Personal information
- Date of birth: April 27, 1967 (age 59)
- Place of birth: Linz, Austria
- Height: 1.82 m (6 ft 0 in)
- Position: Defender

Senior career*
| Years | Team | Apps | (Gls) |
| 1986–1997 | SK VOEST Linz | | |
| 1997–2007 | Union St. Florian | | |
| 2010–2011 | ASK St. Valentin | | |

International career
| 1994 | Austria | 2 | (0) |
- * Club domestic league appearances and goals

Jürgen Werner (born April 27, 1967) is a retired Austrian international footballer.
