= Hans Jürgen Krysmanski =

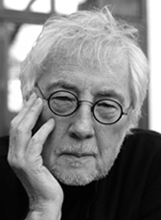

Hans Jürgen Krysmanski (27 October 1935 in Berlin-9 June 2016) was a German sociologist at the University of Münster.

Krysmanski studied sociology, history, psychology and philosophy at the Free University of Berlin, the University of Graz, the University of Vienna, the University of Hamburg and the University of Münster. In 1961 he was awarded his PhD for a thesis about utopian novels of the 20th century.

As assistant of Helmut Schelsky he qualified as a professor with a thesis titled Soziales System und Wissenschaft ("Social system and science"). After being visiting scholar at the Universidad Nacional in Bogotá, Colombia, in 1964 he was named professor and director of the Institute for Sociology at the University of Münster. In 2001 he retired, however still continuing his teaching and researching.

From 1976 to 1991 he was member of executive committee of the World Peace Council and the steering commission of the World Federation of Scientific Workers. He was scientific advisor of the DKP related Instituts für Marxistische Studien und Forschungen ("Institute for Marxist Studies and Research"). In 1984 he ran for the German Friedensliste ("Peace List") for the European Parliament. Later he was member of the Rosa Luxemburg- Foundation, the "Federation of democratic scientistis" (BDWi) and the scientific advisory board of Attac.

His research fields were sociology of knowledge, class analysis, the military-industrial complex, peace and conflict research, media sociology and Power Structure Research. Krysmanski ("Krys") was especially interested in "the connections between the rich and powerful and their arrangements" (Bernd Drücke). As human rights activist he was active following the Pinochet-coup in Chile on 11 September 1973. He was author of several TV contributions, trying to introduce sociological expertise into the broadcasting of political topics. From 1996 to 2000 he coordinated European Popular Science (EPS), a research project of the European Commission.

Krysmanski is author of several books dealing with elites in terms of financial and political power such as Hirten & Wölfe. Wie Geld- und Machteliten sich die Welt aneignen (2004, "Shepards & Wolves. How financial and power elites are taking possession of the world") and 0,1% - Das Imperium der Milliardäre (2012, "0,1 % – The Universe of the Billionaires").
