= Jürgen Baldiga =

German photographer (1959–1993)

- Born: 1959; Essen, West Germany
- Died: 1993 (aged 33–34); Berlin, Germany
- Years active: 1980s
- Known for: Photography of LGBTQ culture in Berlin

Jürgen Baldiga (1959–1993) was a German photographer whose work documented West Berlin's queer subcultures in the 1980s and early 1990s, including the impact of the HIV/AIDS crisis. His photographs is held by the Schwules Museum.

== Life and work ==
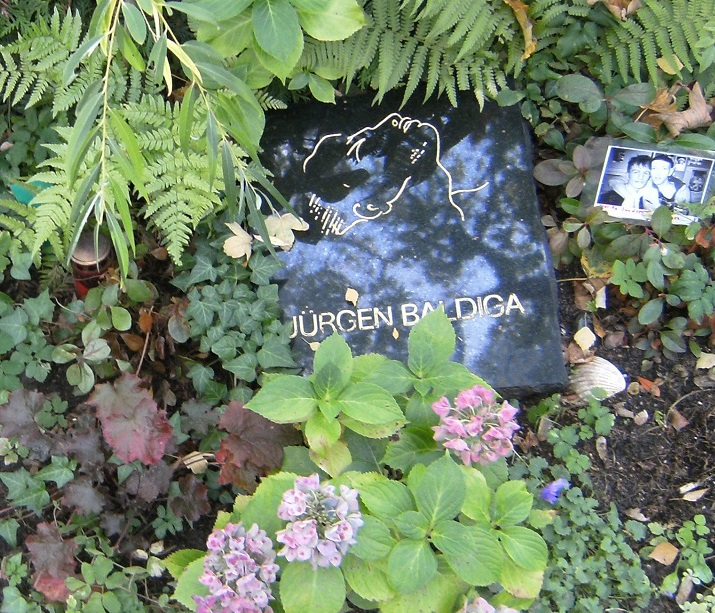
Grave

Baldiga was born in Essen, West Germany, in 1959 and moved to West Berlin in 1979. After first working across writing, performance, film and music, he turned to photography soon after receiving an HIV diagnosis.

Baldiga was active against the stigmatization of people living with HIV/AIDS and as AIDS activist as well as an artist. Alongside thousands of photographs, he kept extensive diaries. He died in Berlin in 1993 of AIDS-related illness, aged 34.

== Exhibitions and legacy ==
Baldiga's estate is preserved at the Schwules Museum, which mounted a large exhibition of his work in 1997. His portraits have also been displayed in community venues such as the Berlin club SchwuZ. In 2024-25, works by Baldiga featured in Grow It, Show It! A Look at Hair from Diane Arbus to TikTok at the Museum Folkwang in Essen.

Two documentaries have explored Baldiga's life and work: Rettet das Feuer (Rescue the Fire, 2019) by Jasco Viefhues, and Baldiga – Entsichertes Herz (Baldiga – Unlocked Heart, 2024) by Markus Stein, which screened in the 74th Berlin International Film Festival.
