= Angelika Gramkow =

German politician (born 1958)

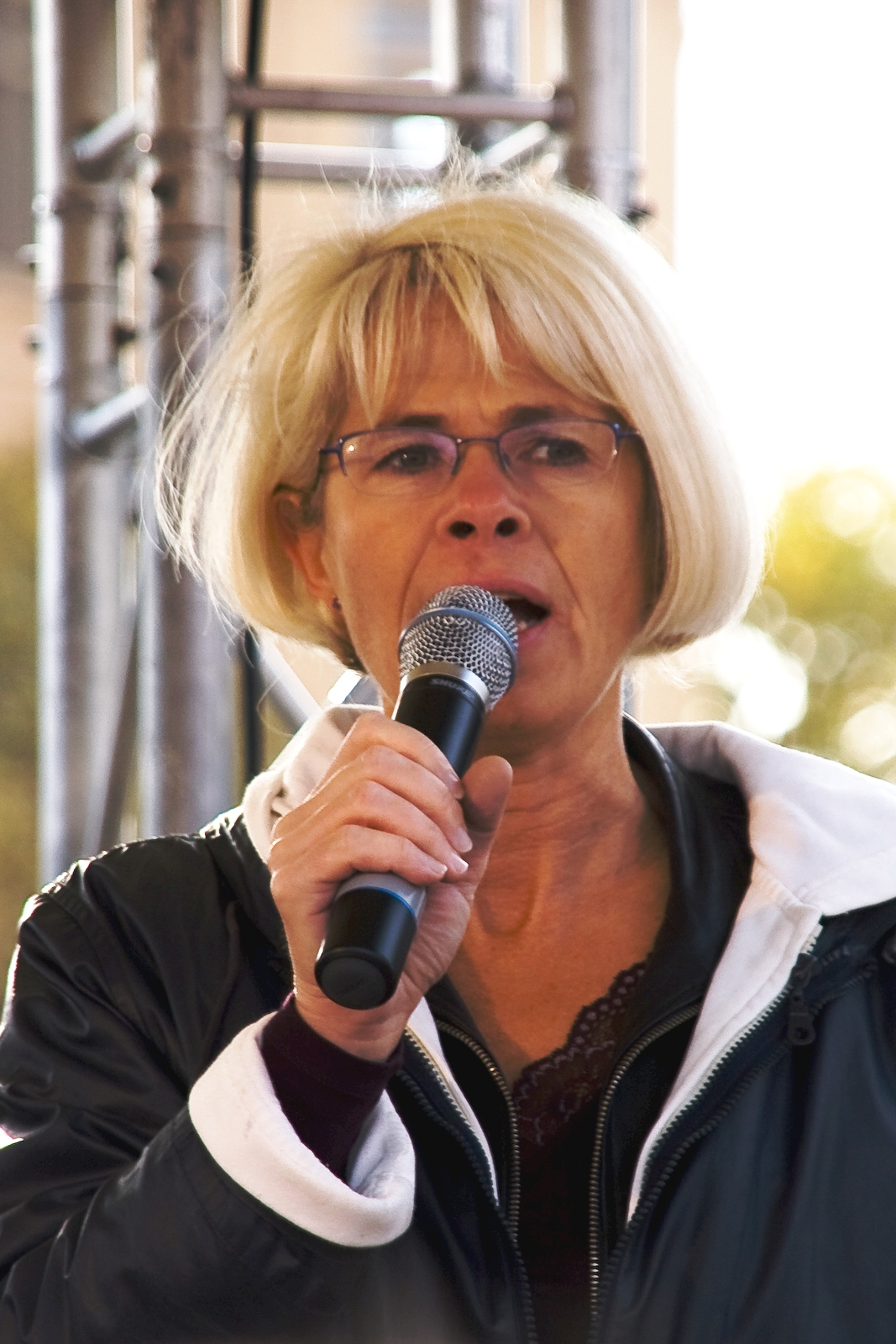
Angelika Gramkow addressing a demonstration outside the regional parliament building 2008

Angelika Gramkow (born 27 September 1958) is a German politician.

She grew up in the German Democratic Republic and remained true to the successors of the old ruling East German Socialist Unity Party (Sozialistische Einheitspartei Deutschlands / SED) after 1989. She was elected to the office of "High Mayor" ("Oberbürgermeisterin") of Schwerin in 2008: she intends to stand for re-election in 2016.

== Life ==
Angelika Gramkow was born in Grevesmühlen, a small town a short distance to the west of Rostock and, at that time, a short distance to the east of the "internal" frontier that separated East Germany from the more economically dynamic Federal Republic of Germany (West Germany). Between 1965 and 1975 she attended the Polytechnic Secondary School ("zehnklassige Polytechnische Oberschule) in nearby Ludwigslust. Her higher education concluded successfully, involving by a period of vocational study at Schwerin focusing on the construction industry (residential). She rejected a career in the construction industry, however. Between 1981 and 1986 she attended university at the other end of the country, in Leipzig, emerging with an economics degree and a teaching qualification.

In 1978 she had joined East Germany's ruling Socialist Unity Party (Sozialistische Einheitspartei Deutschlands / SED). In 1981 Gramkow began to work as a member of the Schwerin regional leadership team ("Kreisleitung") of the Free German Youth (" Freie Deutsche Jugend" / FDJ), the ruling party's youth wing, and traditionally a route to positions of political power and influence. After obtaining her degree she taught at the Schwerin campus of the Gotha Academy for Economics and Finance. She then moved on to the Vocational Academy for Economics and Management, also in Schwerin. where she continued in post till January 1992.

Reunification triggered a move into full-time politics. In June 1991 she became a member of the Regional parliament ("Landtag"), allocated the seat made available by the resignation of her party colleague Helmut Thiel. Within the assembly, she served between 1999 and 2006 as chair of the Left (party) group, having taken over from Caterina Muth who had resigned in bizarre circumstances that involved a shoplifting incident. Gramkow became her party's spokesperson in the assembly for trades union, finance and budget policy, in 2006 adding policy on women to the list.

In 2008 she was elected "Oberbürgermeisterin" ("Lord mayor") of Schwerin. Commentators found the achievement of her election more than averagely remarkable because since the restoration of democracy in 1989, the party of which she is a member, Die Linke, has seldom achieved much more than 20% of the votes in local elections. However, her education in economics and finance, coupled with a reputation for financial competence, gained during her time in the regional Regional parliament ("Landtag"), and her good local connections, were believed to have served her well at a time when local government coffers were bare. She was also helped by the circumstances and scale of her predecessor's defeat: the CDU (centre-right) Norbert Claussen Lord Mayor was rejected by 82.7% of those voting, having been discredited by the death of a five year old child in her parents' home (the "Lea-Sophie affair") and his subsequent attempts to down-play the tragedy and alleged failure of co-ordination between and within the local government departments that it was said to have highlighted.
