= Jürgen Schröder =

Jürgen Schröder may refer to:

- Jürgen Schröder (politician) (born 1940), German politician
- Jürgen Schröder (rower) (born 1940), German rower
- Jürgen Schröder (water polo) (born 1960), German water polo player
