= Victor Jurgens =

American cinematographer and documentary director

- Born: November 18, 1913
- Died: November 30, 1983 (aged 70)
- Occupations: Film cinematographer and director
- Years active: 1939-1961
- Known for: Cinematographer and director for The March of Time series during and after WWII, for Louis de Rochemont, and for the US Information Agency,

Victor Jurgens (November 18, 1913 - November 30, 1983) was an American film cinematographer and director of documentary, educational, and industrial films for the March of Time series during and after WWII, for Louis de Rochemont, and for the US Information Agency,

== Biography ==
Jurgens joined March of Time in 1935 and was a cameraman for eight years in Mexico and Central America, Latin America (including six months in Brazil, Argentina, and Chile as part of the Rockefeller Committee's Public Information campaign), and Australia for the short series March of Time. In 1938, he shot footage of activities in the Chinese war zone occupied by Japan has been granted March of Time after six months’ negotiations. Japan, Master of the Orient (1939) on which he was cameraman was compiled from reportedly the first uncensored films from Japan. Jurgens was among several war correspondents given awards by the War Department for services overseas and presented with campaign ribbons by General Courtney Hodges.

In 1946, he was appointed cameraman for the Pacific region and later director. Jurgens spent more than two years and traveled more than 30,000 miles in the Far East, producing about 40,000 feet of footage for March of Time's Battlefields of the Pacific. Films he shot for March of Time included Australia at War and of the Bikini atom bombing. Jurgens was one of only a handful of experienced newsreel cameramen to film the atom bomb experiment in order to have high-quality footage.

In 1947, Jurgens was appointed unit producer for the Far East, based in Bombay, India, for the educational film series "Your World and Mine" produced by Louis de Rochemont Associates and United World Films Inc. His film Nomads of the Jungle: Malaya premiered at the Paris Theatre in New York City. He was commissioned by the American Museum of Natural History to make films about northwestern Guatemala and the Xingu region of Brazil, but it is not clear if he completed them. He also worked with Louis de Rochemont Associates in Burma to develop a documentary film program, including footage for a film on environmental sanitation, under the leadership of Jules Bucher.

== Filmography ==
- Japan, Master of the Orient, 1939, as cameraman, for March of Time
- Crisis in the Pacific, 1939, as cameraman, for March of Time
- Spoils of Conquest,1940, as cameraman, for March of Time, on the Dutch East Indies
- India in Crisis (Part 1), 1942, as cameraman, for March of Time
- The Argentine Question, 1942, as cameraman, for March of Time, on the country's neutrality during WWII
- Uncle Sam, the Good Neighbor, 1942, as cameraman in Japan and China
- Inside China, 1944, as cameraman, for March of Time
- Back Door to Tokyo, 1944, as cameraman, for March of Time, about retaking the Burma Road as a supply route for Chinese troops by General Stillwell and including aerial shots over the Hump with the Air Transport Command
- The New US Frontier, 1945, as cameraman, about Guam
- The Earth and Its Peoples: Nomads of the Jungle: Malaya, 1948, as director, for Louis de Rochemont Productions for United World Films, Inc.
- Farmers of India (The Middle Ganges Valley), as director and photographer, for Louis de Rochemont Productions for United World Films, Inc.
- Farmer and Fisherman, 19??, as director and editor, for Louis de Rochemont Productions
- Farming in South China (The Si River Valley), as director and photographer, for Louis de Rochemont Productions for United World Films, Inc.
- An Island Nation (Japan), as director and photographer, for Louis de Rochemont Productions for United World Films, Inc.
- An Oriental City (Canton, China), 1949, as director, for Louis de Rochemont Productions
- Sheep Ranch Country (Southeastern Australia), 1949, as director and photographer, as part of series "This World of Ours”
- The Earth and Its Peoples: Tropical Mountain Island (Java), 1949, as director, for Louis de Rochemont Productions for United World Films, Inc.
- 24 Hours of Progress, 1950, as director, for Louis de Rochemont Productions, narrated by Ralph Bellamy, for the Oil Industry Information Committee, American Petroleum Institute
- And the Earth Shall Give Back Life, 1952, as director, for Louis de Rochemont Associates, sponsored by E.R. Squibb & Sons
- Philippine Rehabilitation: Partnership in Freedom, 1952, as director, for Louis de Rochemont Associates, for USIA
- Guatemala (unfinished), 1954, to document life in the Chuchumatanes highlands of Guatemala
- The Scroll, 1956, as director, for USIA, on the cultural exchange visits of Chinese-American artist Dong Kingman
- Himalayan Awakening--Nepal, 1957, as director, for USIA
- A Pilgrimage of Liberty, 1959, as director, for USIA
- Legacy of Cyrus, 1961, as producer on economic modernization in Iran, for USIA
- Nigeria: A Salute to Independence, 1961, as director and producer, for USIA, narrated by Tex Antoine
