= Hans-Jürgen Bäsler =

German footballer

Personal information
- Full name: Hans-Jürgen Bäsler
- Date of birth: 28 March 1938
- Place of birth: Germany
- Date of death: May 2002 (aged 64)
- Position: Defender

Senior career*
Years	Team	Apps	(Gls)
1961–1964	SC Tasmania 1900 Berlin		
1964–1965	Arminia Bielefeld	12	(1)
1965–1966	SC Tasmania 1900 Berlin	17	(0)
- * Club domestic league appearances and goals

Hans-Jürgen Bäsler (28 March 1938 – May 2002) was a German footballer. Bäsler began his career with SC Tasmania 1900 Berlin in the early 1960s, competing in the Berlin city leagues. In 1964, he transferred to Arminia Bielefeld, where he made 12 appearances and scored one goal during the 1964–65 season. He returned to Tasmania Berlin for their sole Bundesliga season in 1965–66, playing in 17 league matches, though the club finished last with a record low points tally. After that season, Bäsler retired from top-flight football.

Bäsler made 17 appearances in the Bundesliga during his playing career.
