= Manfred W. Jürgens =

German painter and photographer

Manfred W. Jürgens (born November 19, 1956) is a German painter and photographer.

== Life and work ==
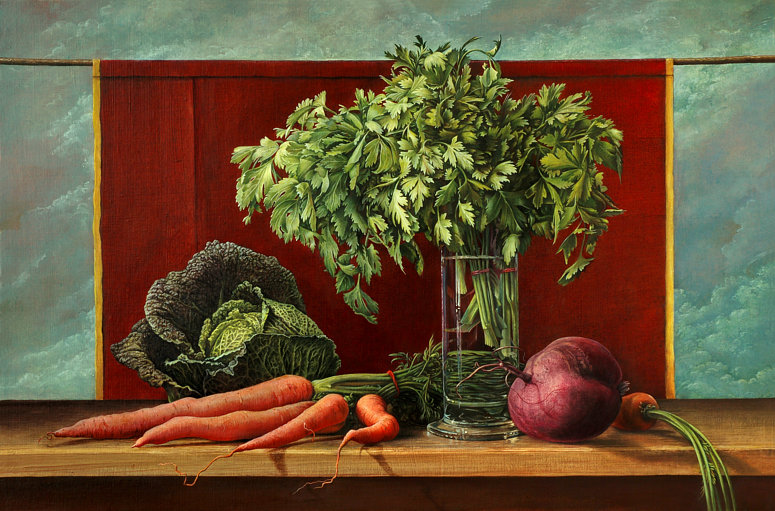
Still-life by Manfred W. Jürgen

Jürgens was born at Mecklenburg in northeastern Germany and spent his childhood there. After attending the Polytechnic Secondary School, he became an apprentice seaman (1973–1975) at the Deutsche Seereederei Rostock, which allowed him to travel to Sweden, the Netherlands, and Cuba in his youth. An apprenticeship and employment as painter and glazier in Mecklenburg followed from 1976 to 1986.

From 1986 to 1989, Jürgens studied communication design at the College for Advertisement and Design in Berlin and specialized in scientific design and photography. There his style was influenced by Photography Professor Manfred Paul. After completing his studies, he began working as a communication designer for Professor Heinrich Dathe at the Zoological Garden Berlin (1989–1990) and as a cultural manager in Mecklenburg (1990–1993). Since 1993, Jürgens has worked as a free-lance painter and photographer.

Beginning in 1997, Jürgens made long journeys to England, Ireland, Switzerland, Italy, Sri Lanka, Taiwan, and China. Jürgens' first exhibition of paintings took place in the Municipal Gallery Baumhaus in Wismar in 2001. Since then, he has had shows in Kühlungsborn, Güstrow, Hamburg, Leipzig, Gstaad and Venice. In 2013, Jürgens completed the portrait of the former German Chancellor Helmut Schmidt.

Since 2007 he has been living in Hamburg and since 2013 also in Bremen.

== Citation ==
- "I can only set a functionalism, a powerful silent against today's inflation of pictures. I believe that it is the attraction of the direct view which enables insights into the soul. When colour becomes not only skin, cloth, water and sky but also soul, then I have overcome the empty panel."
