= Oliver Palotai =

German keyboardist

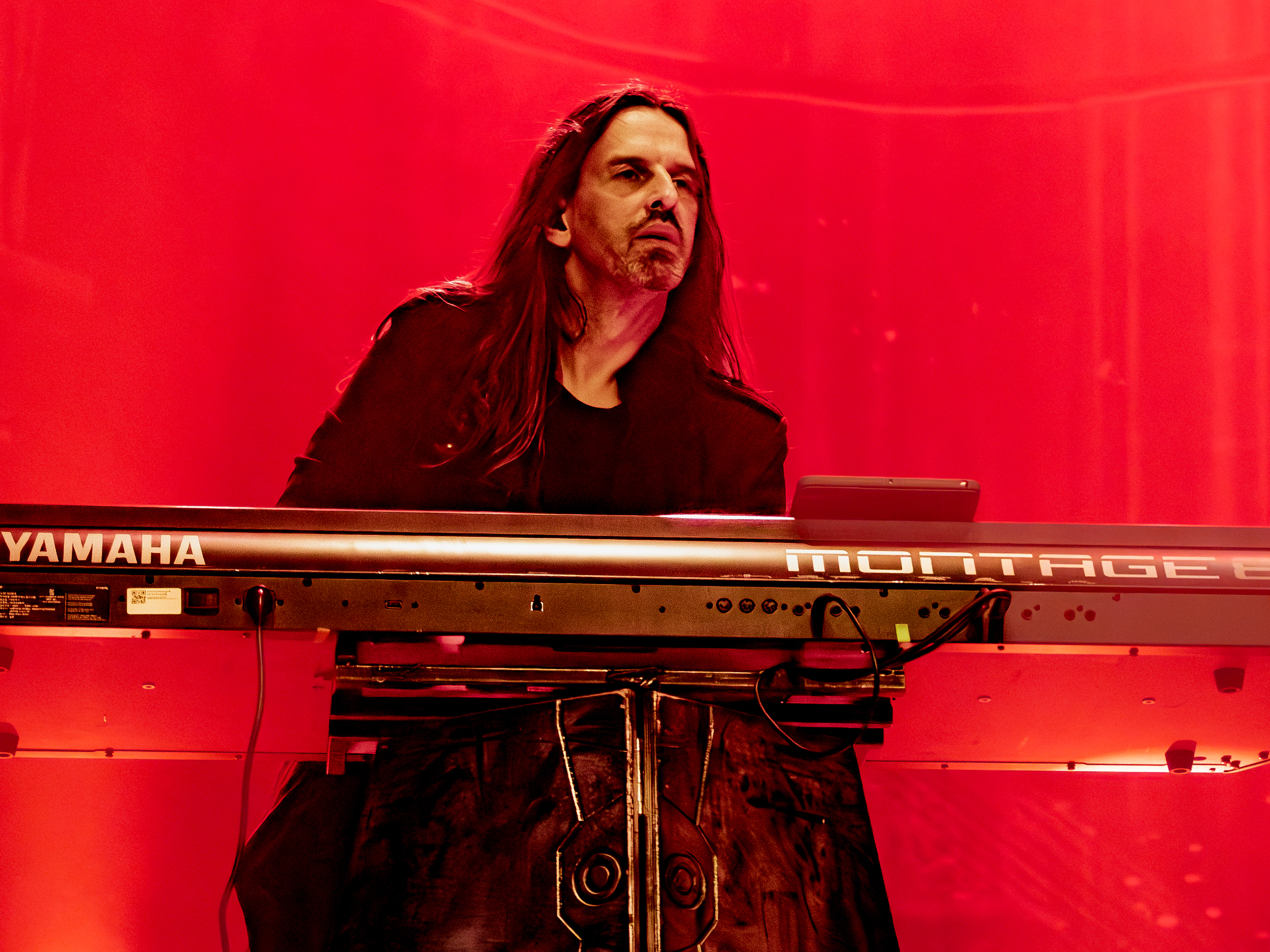
- Palotai during a Kamelot concert in 2024

Background information
- Born: Oliver Palotai; 17 March 1974 (age 51); Sindelfingen, West Germany
- Genres: Symphonic power metal, power metal, progressive metal, classical, jazz
- Occupations: Musician, songwriter, record producer
- Instruments: Keyboards, guitars
- Spouse: Simone Simons (m. 2013)
- Website: palotai.de

Oliver Palotai (born 17 March 1974) is a German musician, best known as a member of the power metal band Kamelot and of Doro Pesch's touring band.

== Career ==
He made his name playing keyboards and guitar for Doro and keyboards for Circle II Circle (as a touring member between 2003 and 2004) before joining Blaze Bayley's BLAZE as a replacement for founding guitarist John Slater in 2004. In 2005 he joined the power metal band Kamelot as a touring keyboard player, and was soon welcomed as a permanent member. Palotai left BLAZE in January 2007. He later formed his own band, Sons of Seasons. releasing albums in 2009 and 2011. He also played keyboards for the Dutch symphonic metal band Epica on their 2010 North American tour.

== Personal life ==
Palotai has diplomas as both a music teacher and a professional musician from Hochschule für Musik Nürnberg-Augsburg.

He has been married to Epica frontwoman Simone Simons since July 6, 2013. Their son, Vincent, was born in October 2013.

== Bands ==
- Doro (2001–2009)
- Uli Jon Roth (2004–present)
- Circle II Circle – keyboards (2006–2007)
- Blaze Bayley (2004–2007) – guitars
- Epica (2010) – live keyboards
- Kamelot (2005–present)
- Sons of Seasons (2007–present)
- Highland Saga (2022–present)
