= Jürgen Steinmetz =

German bassist

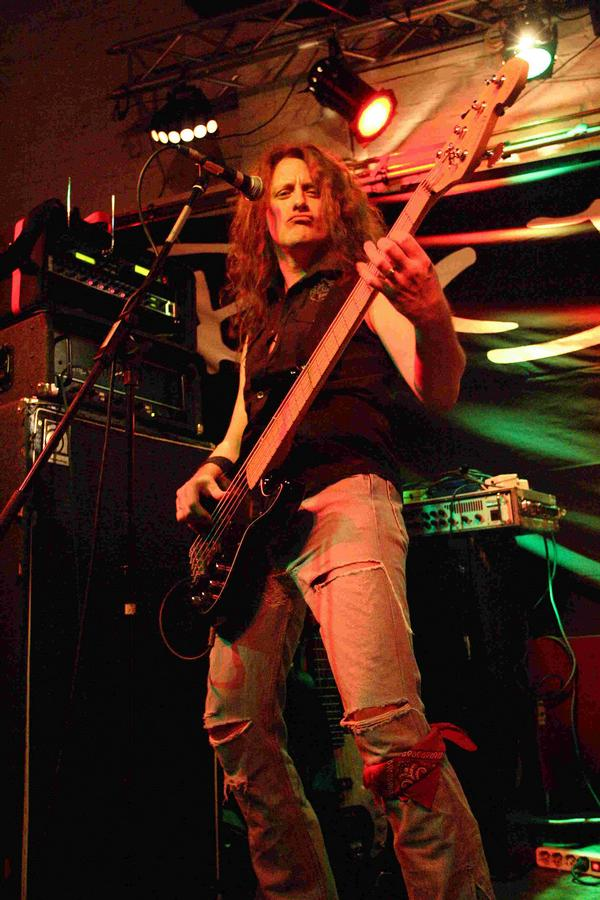
Jürgen Steinmetz

Juergen Steinmetz is a German musician. He is the bass player for Rock Ignition, Silent Force, Sons of Seasons, Lima and ex-member of Headstone Epitaph.

== Biography ==
Juergen Steinmetz founded his first band Headstone Epitaph in 1987. They recorded their first longplayer "Without The Slightest Qualm" in 1996, signed a record deal with Noise Records and released the following albums Wings of Eternity (1998) and Powergames (1999).

For lack of activity of the band he decided to join Silent Force in the year 2000. With them he released three albums, Infatuator (Massacre Records), Worlds Apart and Walk the Earth (Noise Records), touring all over Europe, America and Japan. In 2013, it was announced a new line-up for the band with Mat Sinner replacing Jurgen as their bass player.

In 2006 he founded with singer Heather Shockley the hard rock band Rock Ignition and released through Rockinc. Netherlands the EP "I Can't Resist" which received excellent reviews from magazines and radios all over the globe. In 2013 RI released their second EP "Innocent Thing" through the record label Sound Guerrilla/DA Music. The EP was produced by Jürgen Steinmetz and mixed again by Dennis Ward, and it includes a videoclip of the single "Tell Me". Rock Ignition has toured Germany, the Netherlands, Switzerland, Italy, Spain sharing the stage with legendary bands like Uriah Heep, Axxis, Kamelot, Jon Oliva and many more.

Jürgen joined in 2008 the dark symphonic metal band Sons of Seasons, with members from Doro, Metalium and Kamelot. Sons of Seasons has released through Napalm Records the albums Gods of Vermin and Magnisphyricon and they have toured successfully all over Europe.

== Gear ==
Juergen Steinmetz uses Sandberg bass guitars (California PM 5-string with maple fretboard), Ampeg amplifiers and Elixir Strings.
