= German Academy of Sciences at Berlin =

Primary research institute of East Germany

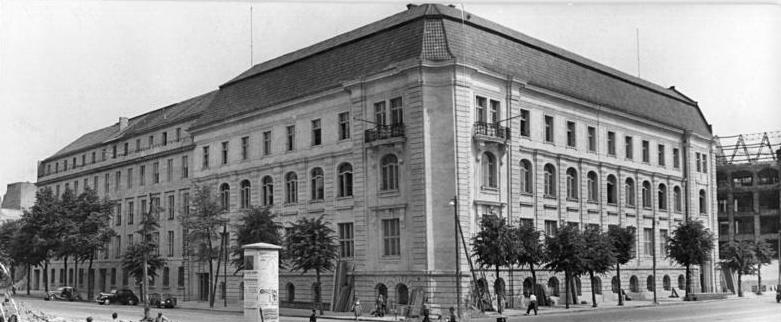
German Academy of Sciences at Berlin: headquarter of the academy, after reopening in the new building at the then renamed Place of the Academy (today Gendarmenmarkt) (1950)

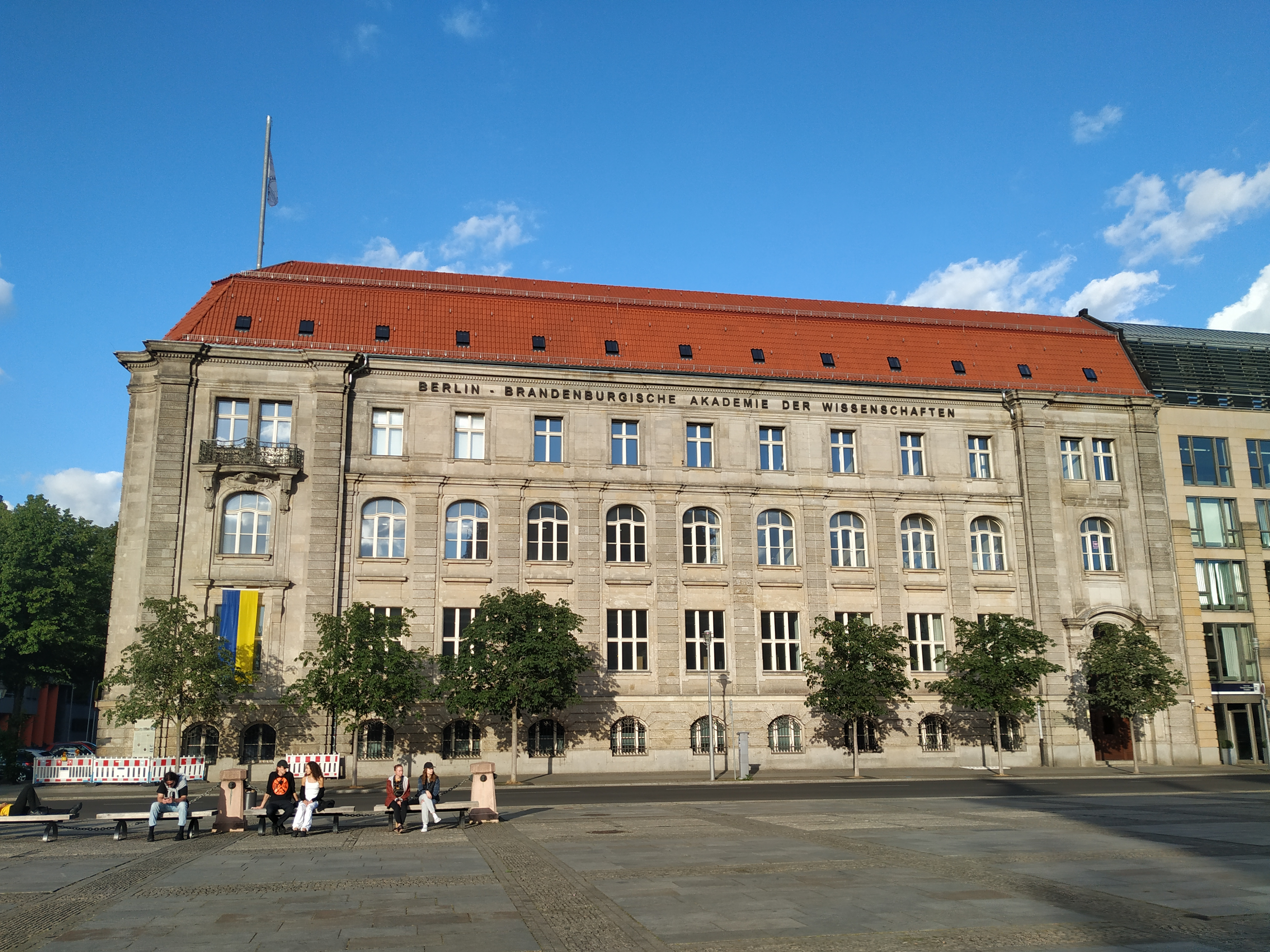
DAW: Historic building of the academy at the Gendarmenmarkt, today seat of its successor, the BBAW

The German Academy of Sciences at Berlin, (German: Deutsche Akademie der Wissenschaften zu Berlin (DAW)), in 1972 renamed the Academy of Sciences of the GDR (Akademie der Wissenschaften der DDR, abbreviated to AdW), was the most eminent research institution of East Germany (German Democratic Republic, GDR).

The DAW was the continuation of the Prussian Academy of Sciences (founded as Brandenburg Society of Sciences in 1700 by Gottfried Wilhelm Leibniz), which after end of war 1945 adapted to new conditions and therefore had performed denazification, changed its structure, its statute and its name. It was then reopened 1946 in the Eastern Sector of Berlin by the Russian military government SMAD. The academy was a learned society (scholarship society), in which awarded membership via election constituted scientific recognition. Unlike other academies of science, the DAW was also the host organization of a scientific community of non-academic research institutes.

Upon German reunification, the Academy's learned society was dissociated from its research institutes and any other affiliates and eventually dissolved in 1992. Since 1993, activities of the AdW's members and college have been continued by the newly established Leibniz Scientific Society (Leibniz-Sozietät der Wissenschaften). The AdW's pending and unfinished research projects and holdings were forwarded to and are carried out by the Berlin-Brandenburg Academy of Sciences and Humanities, established in 1992. The academy's numerous institutes were dissolved on December 31, 1991, and partially reorganized into other organizations such as the Leibniz Association, the Helmholtz Association of German Research Centres, the Max Planck Society and the Fraunhofer Society. A number of minor institutes and associated projects have been preserved and were transferred to other institutions such as the German Archaeological Institute.

== DAW (1946–1972) ==
The German Academy of Sciences at Berlin was the successor to the Prussian Academy of Sciences, which had been founded by Gottfried Wilhelm Leibniz in the year 1700. After the end of World War II, it was re-established upon the SMAD Order No. 187 of July 1, 1946, Leibniz's 300th birthday. The Academy was to become the most eminent scientific institution in Germany. Reorganisation was greatly influenced by the ideas of the Academy of Sciences of the Soviet Union.

To facilitate publishing, the Akademie Verlag was founded in 1946. The 250th anniversary in 1950 was boycotted by West Germany in protest of the overwhelming influence of the East German authorities. The Socialist Unity Party of East Germany had embraced the two-nation doctrine and increasingly enforced its will upon the electorate to have mostly East Germans elected to the academy in the following decades.

== AdW (1972–1989) ==
The institution became the most eminent academy of the German Democratic Republic, and was accordingly renamed the Academy of Sciences of the GDR (Akademie der Wissenschaften der DDR – AdW) in 1972, once the division of Germany was accepted as the state of affairs. In the 1980s, the AdW itself had grown to accommodate over 200 members, including around two dozen West German scientists. The academy coordinated research of 59 institutes that employed 22,000 persons.

== Unwinding and Re-establishments (1989–1993) ==
Following the fall of the Berlin Wall, academy members called for a reform of the academy, rejecting the leading role of the Socialist Unity Party of Germany.

On 27 June 1990, the new GDR government reorganized the academy, turning it into a public institution. Until late 1991, the former AdW institutes were separated from the academy, evaluated, and either dissolved or assigned to different organisations, mainly the Gottfried Wilhelm Leibniz Scientific Community. As the states of Berlin and Brandenburg considered a continuation of the academy as improper due to its role in the GDR, the academy, which had then about 400 members, was disbanded and the Berlin-Brandenburg Academy of Sciences and Humanities was established in 1992.

On 15 April 1993, 60 of the former academy members created the private organisation Leibniz-Sozietät which claims to represent 300 years of continuous academic tradition. After being renamed to Leibniz-Sozietät der Wissenschaften zu Berlin it has now over 300 members, of which most were elected since 1994.
