= Max Delbrück Center for Molecular Medicine in the Helmholtz Association =

German research institute

Coordinates: 52°37′29.4″N 13°30′9.4″E

- Max-Delbrück-Centrum für Molekulare Medizin in der Helmholtz-Gemeinschaft

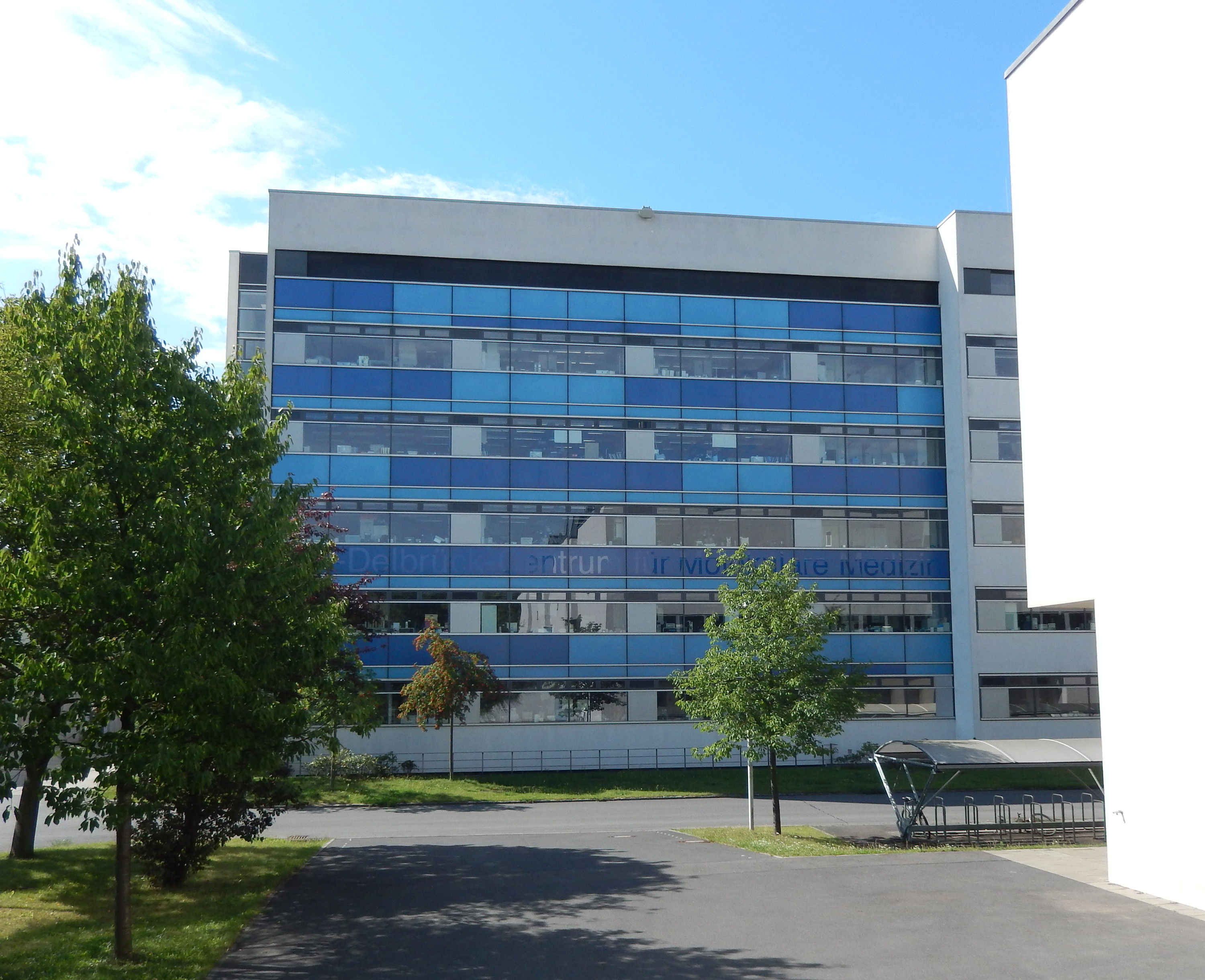
- Named after: Max Delbrück
- Predecessor: Zentralinstitut für Molekularbiologie, Zentralinstitut für Krebsforschung, Zentralinstitut für Herz-Kreislaufforschung
- Formation: January 1, 1992; 34 years ago
- Founded at: Berlin
- Type: Research institute
- Fields: Basic molecular biology research, Clinical research, Systems medicine, Research on cardiovascular disease
- Scientific Director: Maike Sander
- Parent organization: Helmholtz Association
- Staff: 1600 (2023)
- Website: mdc-berlin.de

The Max Delbrück Center for Molecular Medicine in the Helmholtz Association (Max Delbrück Center) in Berlin is one of the 18 institutions that make up the Helmholtz Association. It combines basic molecular biology research with clinical research and is dedicated to the research foci of systems medicine and cardiovascular diseases. The research center is named after the Berlin-born biophysicist and Nobel laureate Max Delbrück. The center is headed by Maike Sander.

== History ==
The Max Delbrück Center was established in Berlin-Buch in January 1992. Detlev Ganten was the founding director. The research center is the successor to three institutions that had belonged to the Academy of Sciences of the GDR until 1990: the Central Institute for Molecular Biology (Zentralinstitut für Molekularbiologie), the Central Institute for Cancer Research (Zentralinstitut für Krebsforschung), and the Central Institute for Cardiovascular Research (Zentralinstitut für Herz-Kreislaufforschung), which had emerged from the Institute for Medicine and Biology (Institut für Medizin und Biologie) that had existed in Berlin-Buch since 1947.

In 1995, the research center became a member of the Helmholtz Association and in 2007 began operating a joint research center with Charité: the "Experimental and Clinical Research Center" (ECRC). In 2008, the "Berlin Institute for Medical Systems Biology" (MDC-BIMSB) opened, moving to its present home in Berlin-Mitte in 2019.

In 2013, the Max Delbrück Center was one of the founding members of the EU-LIFE Alliance, a network of European life sciences research centers promoting cutting-edge research. In the same year, the Berlin Institute of Health at Charité (BIH) began operations, a joint endeavor of Charité and the Max Delbrück Center focused on translational medicine and precision medicine.

In 2021, BIH was integrated into the translational research area at Charité, forming its third pillar alongside the Clinical Center and the Medical Faculty; since then, the Max Delbrück Center has been a privileged partner of BIH. In 2020, the Max Delbrück Center was one of the founders of BR50, an association of non-university research institutions that aims to strengthen the Berlin-Brandenburg region as a hub for science. The Max Delbrück Center and Heidelberg University founded the Helmholtz Institute for Translational AngioCardioScience (HI-TAC) in the summer of 2023 to conduct research on an early warning system for cardiovascular diseases.

From 1992 to 2013, the Research Center awarded the Max Delbrück Medal annually as part of the Berlin Lectures on Molecular Medicine.

== Research program ==
The goal of research at the Max Delbrück Center is to investigate the causes of disease and health down to the smallest and most basic level and to put the knowledge gained and technological innovations developed into application as quickly as possible. The center’s research can be broken down into the following broad topics:

- Genes, Cells and Cell‑based Medicine
- Molecular Processes and Therapies
- Integrative Biomedicine

The fourth focus, called "Cross-Cutting Areas," deals with

- Data Science and Artificial Intelligence
- Immunology and Inflammation
- Single cell approaches for personalized medicine
- Translational Vascular Biomedicine ("Berlin Center for Translational Vascular Biomedicine")

A special focus of the Max Delbrück Center is systems biology, for which it founded the "Berlin Institute for Medical Systems Biology" (MDC-BIMSB) in 2008.

== Technology platforms ==
The Max Delbrück Center's scientific infrastructure includes 19 technology platforms (as of 2022). They support and develop established and standardized technologies as well as those that are still being explored, developed or researched.

== Collaborations ==
The Max Delbrück Center participates in multiple domestic and international research networks. Within Germany, collaboration with Charité is particarly close. The ECRC and the BIH are the institutions at the core of this collaborative partnership. The goal of the ECRC's work is to translate basic scientific findings into clinical applications in order to improve the diagnosis, prevention, and therapy of common diseases (cardiovascular and metabolic diseases, cancer, neurological diseases).

The Max Delbrück Center also collaborates with the other centers of the Helmholtz Association in the research field of "Helmholtz Health". Specifically, these are the German Cancer Research Center, the German Center for Neurodegenerative Diseases, the Helmholtz-Zentrum Dresden-Rossendorf, the Helmholtz Centre for Infection Research and Helmholtz Zentrum München. Together with the Leibniz Association, German universities, university hospitals, federal and state institutes, and the Fraunhofer Society, a nationwide long-term health study has also been conducted since 2014 – the NAKO Health Study.

In addition to individual studies in which the Max Delbrück Center cooperates with third parties, the center is also involved in comprehensive national research collaborations, such as the National Center for Tumor Diseases (Nationales Centrum für Tumorerkrankungen) or the German Center for Cardiovascular Research (Deutsches Zentrum für Herz-Kreislauf-Forschung) as part of the "National Decade against Cancer".

The Max Delbrück Center is also involved in major international research collaborations, such as participating in the creation of the “Heart Atlas”, a sub-project of the Human Cell Atlas. It also drove the creation of the "Fly Cell Atlas," as well as research on chronic diseases with high morbidity and mortality (e.g., cardiometabolic or neurodegenerative diseases) and cancer in the "NOVA Institute for Medical Systems Biology" (NIMSB) in Portugal.

== Spin-offs and public engagement ==
Six companies were founded out of the Max Delbrück Center between 1997 and 2021. These spin-offs are dedicated to researching therapies for serious illnesses such as cancer and muscle diseases. In terms of public engagement, the Max Delbrück Center participates in outreach activities such as the Berlin Science Week, the annual Long Night of Science in Berlin and the Life Science Learning Lab to inform, engage, and interest the general public in its research and work.

== Funding and management ==
The Max Delbrück Center receives 90% of its funding from the Federal Government of Germany and 10% from the State of Berlin, in addition to third-party funding. Total basic funding for 2022 was 105.5 million euros; total third-party funding and other income was 36.6 million euros

Since 1 November 2022, Maike Sander has served as Scientific Director and Chairperson of the Board of Directors.

== Animal experiments and alternatives ==
The research center is a member of the European Animal Research Association (EARA) and has signed the Basel Declaration, which commits to the highest ethical standards in animal experimentation and calls for an open dialogue on the use of animals in research.

In 2021, the Max Delbrück Center was awarded the "Transparent Animal Experiments" seal. In the same year, the center joined with other research institutions to found the "Einstein Center 3R," an initiative to strengthen alternative methods in biomedical research and to add weight to animal welfare.

== See also ==
- Universities and research institutions in Berlin
