= Çağhan Kızıl =

Turkish neuroscientist and geneticist (born 1981)

- Born: October 14, 1981 (age 44); Zonguldak, Turkey
- Education: Middle East Technical University (BSc); University of Göttingen (MSc); University of Tübingen (PhD); TU Dresden (Habilitation)
- Scientific career
- Fields: Neuroscience; Genetics; Functional genomics
- Workplaces: Max Planck Institute; TU Dresden; Helmholtz Association of German Research Centres; Columbia University
- Doctoral advisor: Christiane Nüsslein-Volhard
- Website: www.neurology.columbia.edu/profile/caghan-kizil-phd www.kizillab.org

Çağhan Kızıl (born October 14, 1981) is a Turkish/German neuroscientist and geneticist, and Professor of Neurological Sciences at the Department of Neurology and the Taub Institute for Research on Alzheimer's Disease and the Aging Brain at the Columbia University Vagelos College of Physicians and Surgeons Columbia University Irving Medical Center.

His research culminates interdisciplinary approaches harboring genetics, neuroscience, cell biology, neuroimmunology, biotechnology and drug development. His team focuses on learning from Zebrafish how to enable the adult brain to better cope with neurodegenerative diseases and regenerate. By generating the first adult zebrafish brain Alzheimer's model, and single cell sequencing-based investigation of the stem cell plasticity in this model, he aims to understand the molecular programs for zebrafish brain to induce regenerative neural stem cell plasticity and to investigate the functions of human genes related to Alzheimer's disease in zebrafish brain. He develops tools for comparative studies in mammalian brains such as 3D human brain models as novel in vitro platforms for drug development.

In 2024, Kizil and colleagues identified a rare protective variant in the fibronectin 1 (FN1) gene that was associated with a substantially reduced risk of Alzheimer's disease among carriers of the high-risk APOE ε4 allele. The study combined large-scale human genetic analyses with postmortem brain tissue and experimental validation in zebrafish, implicating fibronectin at the blood–brain barrier as a key mediator of Alzheimer's disease risk and a potential therapeutic target. The findings received broad coverage in the scientific and popular press, including by Alzforum, which described the work as identifying a rare protective variant that may explain resilience to APOE ε4-associated Alzheimer's disease, and Newsweek, which highlighted its implications for new therapeutic strategies. Building on this work, his laboratory subsequently showed that fibronectin mediates APOE4-driven blood–brain barrier dysfunction in Alzheimer's disease, disrupting astrocyte–endothelial interactions, in a study published in Nature Aging.

Previously, he was leading Helmholtz research group in German Center for Neurodegenerative Diseases within Helmholtz Association. He established his lab after receiving Helmholtz Young investigator award in 2013. In 2014, he became Docent (Associate Professor) by Council of Higher Education (Turkey). In 2019, he became a tenured group leader in DZNE Dresden within the Helmholtz Association. He was the founder CEO of the first spin-off company of German Center for Neurodegenerative Diseases, Neuron-D GmbH that specializes on 3D high-throughput drug screening platform for neurological diseases.
