= Patanè =

Patanè is an Italian surname from Sicily, particularly Catania. It may derive from the corruption of a place name like Aci Platani, Acquaviva Platani or San Biagio Platani. Notable people with the surname include:

- Amalia Patanè, Italian physicist and academic
- Francesco Patanè (1902–1980), Italian painter, engraver and sculptor
- Giuseppe Patanè (1932–1989), Italian opera conductor
- Joe Patane (born 1970), American television personality
- Luca Patanè (born 1961), Italian businessman
- Lucy Patané (born 1985), Argentine musician, composer and producer

== See also ==
- Sebastian Patane, personal name of Marvel character Cat-Man
- United States v. Patane
