= Maike Sander =

German-American physician and academic (born 1967)

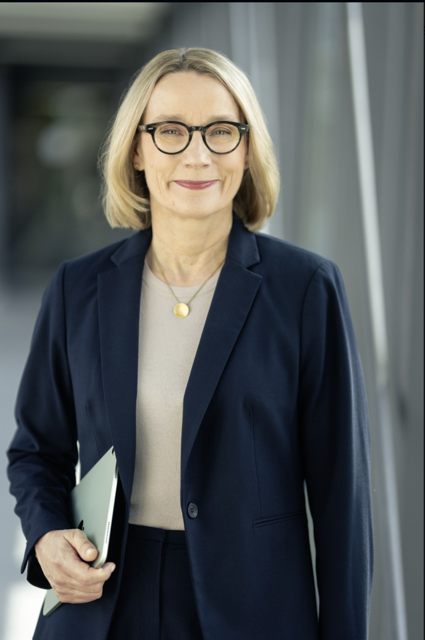
Maike Sander 2025

Maike Sander (born August 16, 1967, in Göttingen, Germany) is a German-American physician and scientist. She is known for her research on diabetes. Since November 2022, she has served as Scientific Director and Chair of the Board of the Max Delbrück Center for Molecular Medicine (MDC) in Berlin, making her the first woman to head one of the Helmholtz Health Centers. In January 2025, she was elected Vice-President of Helmholtz Health.

== Education and career ==
Sander was raised in Göttingen, Germany. Sander graduated with a medical degree from Heidelberg University in 1994. From 1994 to 1999, she was a research fellow at the University of California, San Francisco, having previously participated in an exchange program there in 1991. Between 1999 and 2003, she was an assistant professor at the Center for Molecular Neurobiology at the University of Hamburg. She then joined the University of California, Irvine, where she served as an assistant professor and later associate professor from 2003 to 2008. From 2008 to 2022, she was a professor in the Departments of Pediatrics and Cellular & Molecular Medicine at the University of California, San Diego (UC San Diego), and served as the Director of the Pediatric Diabetes Research Center from 2012 to 2022. In 2022 she moved to Germany to assume the role of scientific director of the Max Delbrück Center for Molecular Medicine in Berlin.

In addition to her primary appointments, Sander was Co-Director of the Center on Diabetes at the Institute of Engineering in Medicine at UC San Diego from 2014 to 2022. From 2019 to 2022, she was an Einstein Visiting Fellow at the Berlin Institute of Health (BIH). Since 2024, she has also held a professorship at Charité – Universitätsmedizin Berlin.

== Research ==
Sander's research focuses on the molecular mechanisms that govern pancreatic beta cell development, function, and regeneration, with the goal of developing new treatments for diabetes. Her work investigates how dynamic changes in gene expression, transcription factor binding, and chromatin structure regulate beta cell differentiation, identity, and functional maintenance. These studies have revealed fundamental mechanisms of cell fate determination and cellular plasticity in both normal pancreatic development and the pathogenesis of diabetes. More recently, her research has centered on developing platforms to generate insulin-producing pancreatic beta cells from human pluripotent stem cells for therapeutic applications.

== Awards and honors ==
Sander received the Grodsky Award of the Juvenile Diabetes Research Foundation in 2008 and became a member of the American Society for Clinical Investigation in 2011. In 2017 she was elected to the German National Academy of Sciences Leopoldina, and received the Humboldt Research Award from the Alexander von Humboldt Foundation; and in 2020 she was elected to the Association of American Physicians. She received the Albert Renold Prize from the European Association for the Study of Diabetes in 2022. She was elected to the Berlin-Brandenburg Academy of Sciences and Humanities in 2024 and to the European Molecular Biology Organization in 2025. She was elected to the Academia Europaea in 2025.

== Selected publications ==
- Sander, M; Neubüser, A; Kalamaras, J; Ee, H C; Martin, G R; German, M S (1997-07-01). "Genetic analysis reveals that PAX6 is required for normal transcription of pancreatic hormone genes and islet development" (PDF). Genes & Development. 11 (13): 1662–1673. doi:10.1101/gad.11.13.1662. ISSN 0890-9369.
- Sander, Maike; Sussel, Lori; Conners, Jennifer; Scheel, David; Kalamaras, Julie; Cruz, Filemon Dela; Schwitzgebel, Valerie; Hayes-Jordan, Andrea; German, Michael (2000-12-15). "Homeobox gene Nkx6 . 1 lies downstream of Nkx2 . 2 in the major pathway of β-cell formation in the pancreas". Development. 127 (24): 5533–5540. doi:10.1242/dev.127.24.5533. ISSN 0950-1991.
- Taylor, Brandon-L.; Liu, Fen-Fen; Sander, Maike (2013-09-12). "Nkx6.1 Is Essential for Maintaining the Functional State of Pancreatic Beta Cells". Cell Reports. 4 (6): 1262–1275. doi:10.1016/j.celrep.2013.08.010. PMC 4058003. PMID 24035389.
- Nguyen-Ngoc, Kim-Vy; Wortham, Matthew; Sander, Maike (2022-03-14). "Sizing up beta cells made from stem cells". Nature Biotechnology. 40 (7): 1006–1008. doi:10.1038/s41587-022-01271-9. ISSN 1087-0156.
- Wang, Gaowei; Chiou, Joshua; Zeng, Chun; Miller, Michael; Matta, Ileana; Han, Jee Yun; Kadakia, Nikita; Okino, Mei-Lin; Beebe, Elisha; Mallick, Medhavi; Camunas-Soler, Joan; dos Santos, Theodore; Dai, Xiao-Qing; Ellis, Cara; Hang, Yan; Kim, Seung K.; MacDonald, Patrick E.; Kandeel, Fouad R.; Preissl, Sebastian; Gaulton, Kyle J.; Sander, Maike (2023). "Integrating genetics with single-cell multiomic measurements across disease states identifies mechanisms of beta cell dysfunction in type 2 diabetes". Nature Genetics. 55 (6): 984–994. doi:10.1038/s41588-023-01397-9. ISSN 1061-4036. PMC 10550816. PMID 37231096.
- Jun, Yesl; Nguyen-Ngoc, Kim-Vy; Sai, Somesh; Bender, R. Hugh F.; Gong, Winnie; Kravets, Vira; Zhu, Han; Hatch, Christopher J.; Schlichting, Michael; Gaetani, Roberto; Mallick, Medhavi; Hachey, Stephanie J.; Christman, Karen L.; George, Steven C.; Hughes, Christopher C. W. (2025-05-20). "Engineered vasculature induces functional maturation of pluripotent stem cell-derived islet organoids". Developmental Cell. 60 (18): 2455–2469.e7. doi:10.1016/j.devcel.2025.04.024. PMC 12353569. PMID 40412386.
