= Dresden High Magnetic Field Laboratory =

German research facility

Coordinates: 51°03′49″N 13°56′59″E

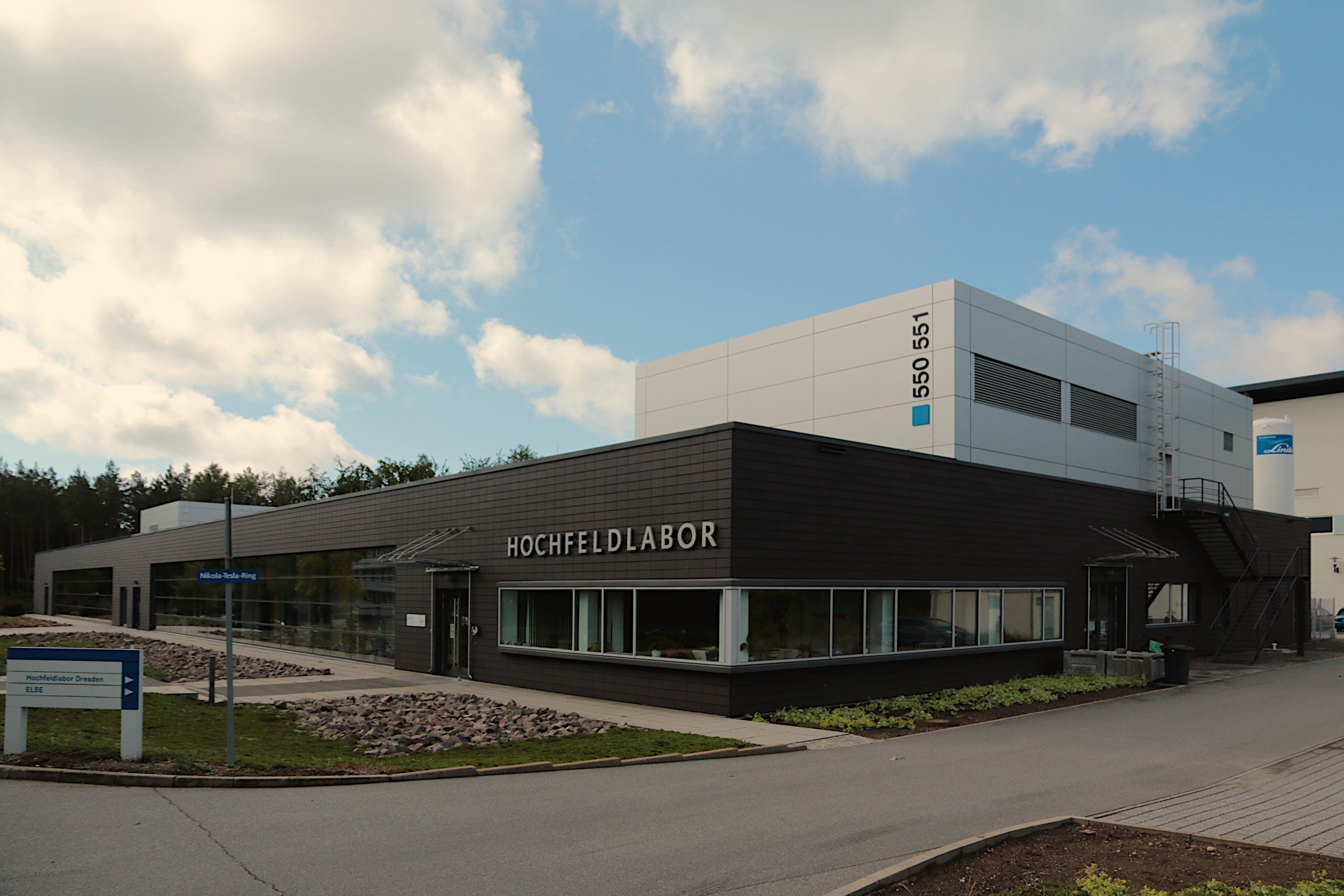
Established:	2004
Director:	Joachim Wosnitza
Responsible body:	Free State of Saxony, Federal Ministry of Education and Research (Germany)
Research Field:	Physics
Disciplines:	Solid State Physics, Low Temperature Physics
Location:	Dresden, Germany
Official website:	www.hzdr.de/hld

The Dresden High Magnetic Field Laboratory (Hochfeld-Magnetlabor Dresden, HLD) in the Helmholtz-Zentrum Dresden-Rossendorf (HZDR) focuses on modern materials research at high magnetic fields. It serves as a research facility for in-house as well as for user projects and provides research opportunities for pulsed magnetic fields up to 90 T for routine operation. A record field close to 95.6 T was reached in 2011. The HLD aims at reaching magnetic fields up to the feasibility limit of about 100 tesla.

== History ==
In 1999, a proposal was submitted to the Federal Ministry of Education and Research (Germany) and the Saxon Ministry of Science and Art requesting the establishment of the High Magnetic Field Laboratory. After evaluation by the German Council of Science and Humanities basic funding was recommended and in 2003 the construction of the Dresden High Magnetic Field Laboratory started on the site of the HZDR. Investment costs were about €24.5 million and were shared equally by the federal government and the Free State of Saxony. In December 2004, the Dresden High Magnetic Field Laboratory headed by Prof. Dr. Joachim Wosnitza was founded.

== User Program ==
The HLD is accepting proposals for magnet time in pulsed magnetic fields and hosted users since the beginning of 2007. The proposals are administrated and evaluated in the frame of the EMFL user program.

== Research ==
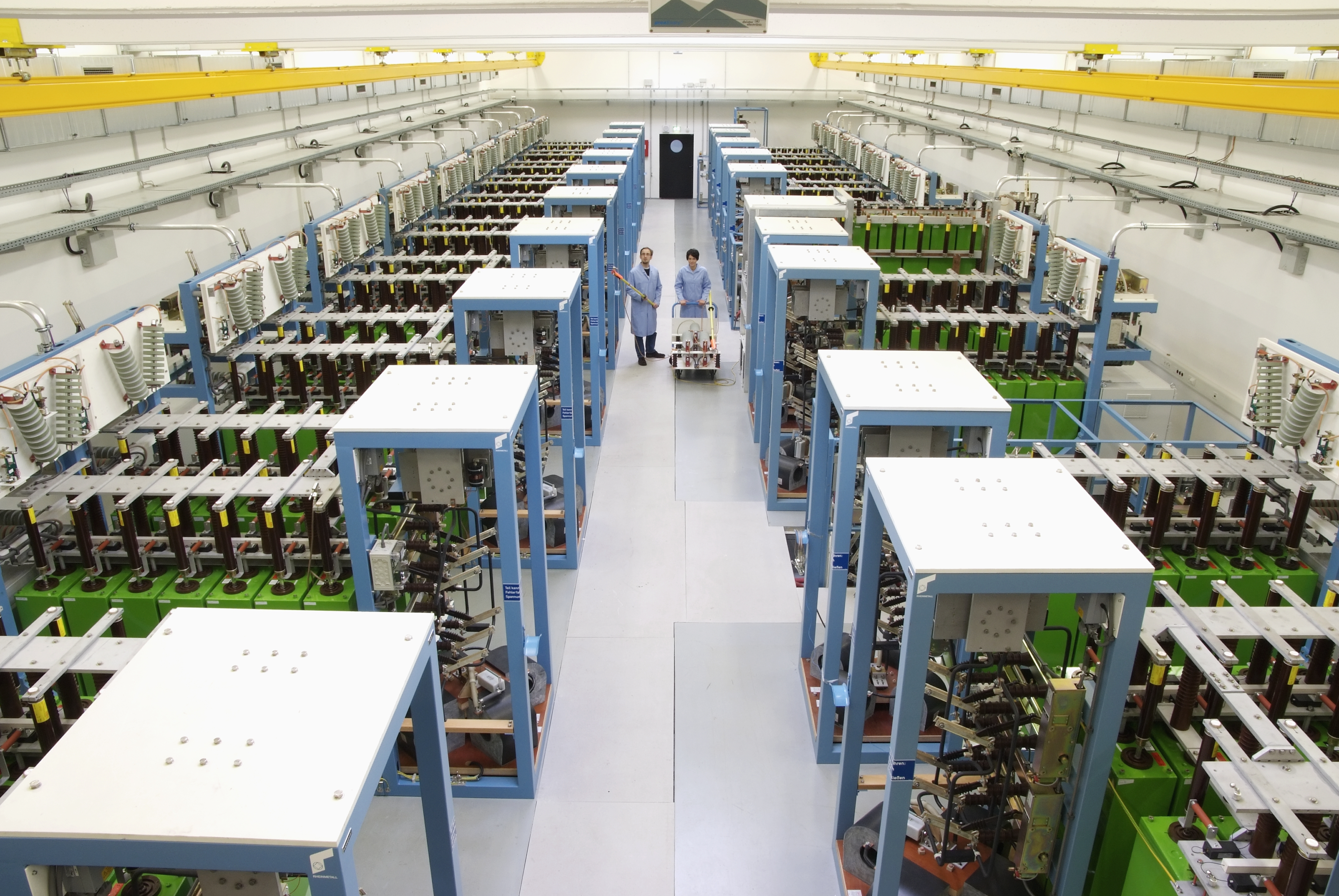
Dresden High Magnetic Field Laboratory

The Dresden High Magnetic Field Laboratory provides access to a magnet with a magnetic flux density of more than 95 teslas with a pulse duration of 11 milliseconds in a diameter of 16 millimeters. Similarly strong magnetic fields are generated only at the Los Alamos National Laboratory in Los Alamos, USA. In addition, the HLD operates several 70 tesla coils with pulse durations of 150 milliseconds.

The HLD has an in-house coil development and production program. Because of the high magnetic pressure, a high-strength synthetic fiber has to be wound around the wire layers. The aim is to achieve a field of 100 teslas over a pulse duration of 10 milliseconds. The required energy of 50 MJ is provided by the world's largest capacitor bank, custom-made for this laboratory.

Primarily, the electronic properties of metallic, semiconducting, superconducting, and magnetic materials are studied at the HLD in high magnetic fields. These include in particular exotic superconductors, strongly correlated electron systems, low-dimensional spin systems, and nanostructures. The pulse durations are sufficient to allow for e.g. resistance, magnetization, ultrasound, ESR and NMR measurements. Uniquely, the radiation provided by the free-electron lasers (FEL) of the neighboring superconducting electron accelerator ELBE can be used for magneto-optical experiments in the infrared spectral range.

== HLD 2.0 ==
In response to the large user demand, the Dresden High Magnetic Field Laboratory (HLD) was extended. From 2011 to 2013, it was equipped with a new capacitor bank and six additional magnet cells.

== Cooperation ==
The HLD cooperates with several research institutions in Dresden:

- Max Planck Institute for Chemical Physics of Solids (MPI-CpfS)
- Max Planck Institute for the Physics of Complex Systems (MPI-PKS)
- Technische Universität Dresden
- Leibniz Institute for Solid State and Materials Research Dresden (IFW Dresden)
- Leibniz Institute of Polymer Research Dresden (IPF Dresden)

In addition to collaborating with other research institutions in Germany, further European collaborations funded by the European Union exist. The aim of the EU project European Magnetic Field Laboratory (EMFL) is to attract new users to the large research facilities of the participating laboratories within Europe and to develop cooperation in management, infrastructure, and communications. Partners in the EMFL project are: the Dutch "High Magnetic Field Laboratory" in Nijmegen, the French "Laboratoire des Champs Magnétiques Intenses" (LNCMI) in Grenoble and Toulouse and the HLD.
