= Kerstin Eckert =

German scientist

Prof. Dr. Kerstin Eckert

TU Dresden, Chair of Transport Processes at Interfaces Helmholtz Center Dresden Rossendorf (HZDR)

Personal details
- Born: 25 August 1966 (age 60)
- Website: https://DCM.science/

Kerstin Eckert (born August 25, 1966) is a German scientist. She is the head of the Chair of Transport Processes at Interfaces, a combined chair of Helmholtz-Zentrum Dresden-Rossendorf and TU Dresden created in October 2016.

== Publications ==
- List of publications at Google Scholar
- List of publications at ORCID
