= FZR =

FZR may refer to:

- Firozpur Cantonment railway station, in Punjab, India
- Forschungszentrum Rossendorf, now the Helmholtz-Zentrum Dresden-Rossendorf, a German research laboratory
- Zirconium fluoride (FZr)
