= Helmholtz Institute Jena =

Physics Institute

Coordinates: 50°56′04.35″N 11°34′50.67″E

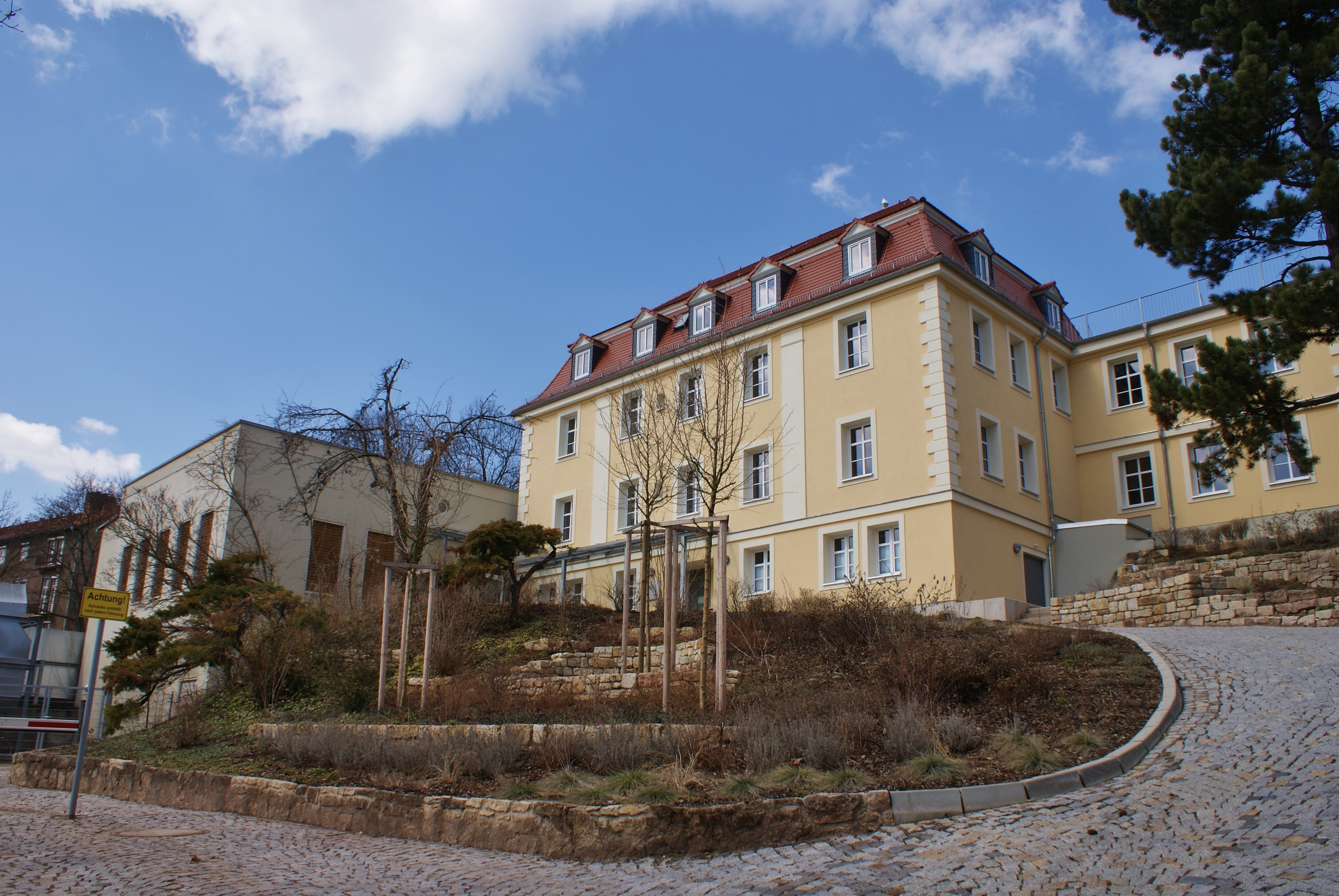
- Helmholtz Institute at the Fröbelstieg in Jena
- Formation: 2009
- Headquarters: Jena, Germany
- Director: Thomas Stöhlker
- Website: www.hi-jena.de/en/

The Helmholtz Institute Jena was founded as an outstation of the GSI Helmholtzzentrum für Schwerionenforschung on June 25, 2009 and is located on the campus of the Friedrich Schiller University (FSU) in the city of Jena, Germany. Its purpose is to unite the research activities of the FSU in the fields of high intensity laser physics and x-ray spectroscopy with the expertise of the Deutsches Elektronen-Synchrotron (DESY), GSI Helmholtzzentrum für Schwerionenforschung and Helmholtz-Zentrum Dresden-Rossendorf in the fields of accelerator physics, laser physics and x-ray technology. The research profile of the Helmholtz Institute Jena is focused on the physics occurring at the border between conventional particle-acceleration technology and the fast-evolving field of laser-induced particle acceleration. (e.g. wakefield accelerator). It is concerned with advancing these new laser-induced accelerator concepts, as well as with the production and investigation of intense photon and particle beams, including their interaction with matter. Therefore the main activities of the institute are emphasized on the development of high intensity lasers, new concepts for laser-driven particle acceleration, x-ray spectroscopy and strong-field quantum electrodynamics, as well as on the physics of hot dense plasmas. Apart from that the Helmholtz Institute Jena aims to contribute to the further development of the research facilities at the Helmholtz center GSI, especially the future project FAIR (Facility for Antiproton and Ion Research), and DESY with the free-electron laser (FEL) photon sources FLASH and XFEL (European XFEL). In cooperation with the FSU Jena a completely diode-pumped laser system of the high energy petawatt class (HEPW) with the POLARIS laser is realized in the building of the Helmholtz Institute Jena. First measurements are done since 2008. Due to the missing last amplifier stage the pulse strength of 1 PW couldn't be reached yet. The graduate school "Research School for Advanced Photon Science" (RS-APS) was established at the Helmholtz Institute Jena in July 2012. The RS-APS supports up to 25 PhD students and provides a structured graduation program in cooperation with facilities of the FSU Jena and the Helmholtz Graduate School for Hadron and Ion Research (HGS-HIRe).
