= Tim Sparwasser =

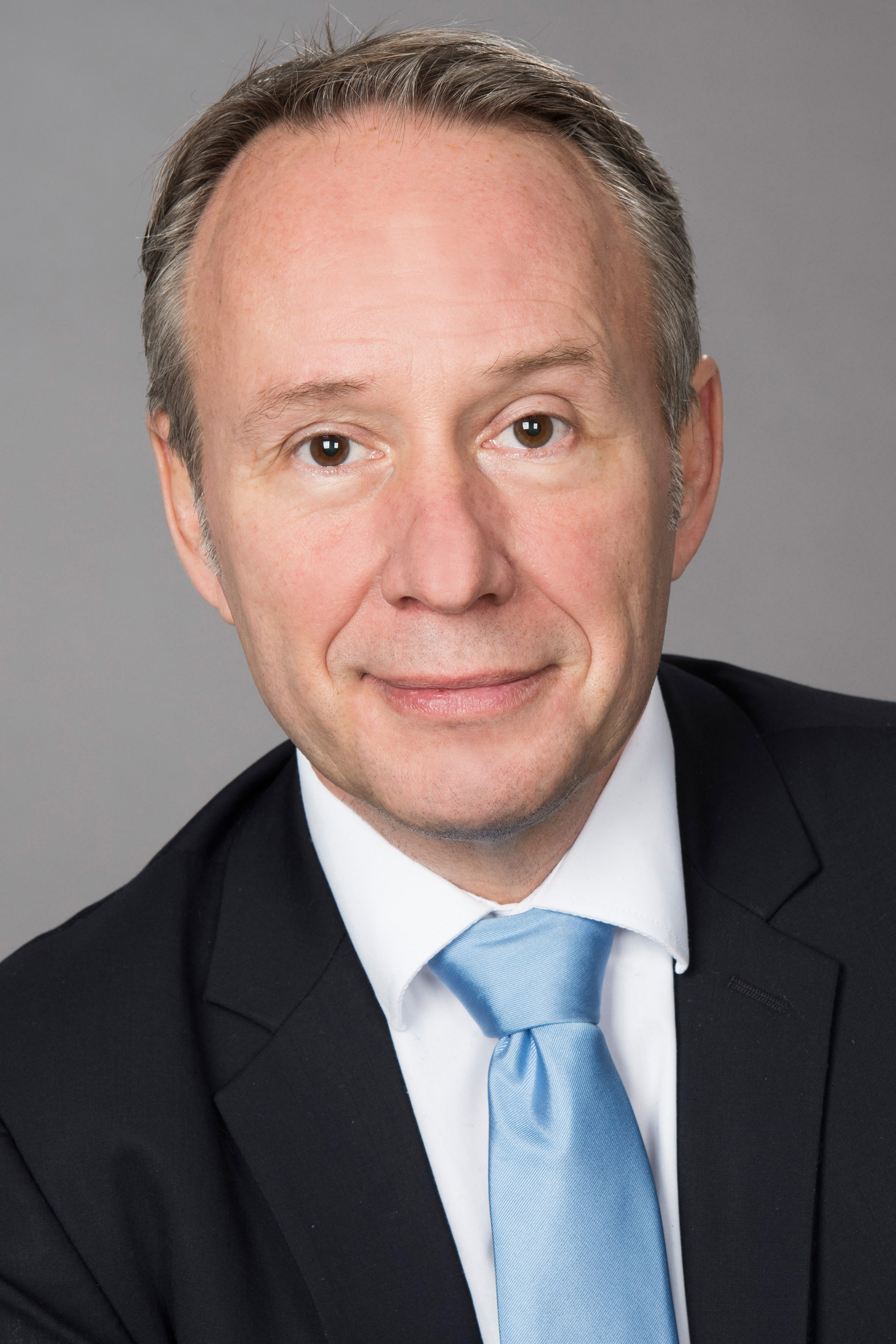
Tim Dominik Sparwasser

Tim Dominik Sparwasser (* 8 January 1969 in Mainz) is a German physician, microbiologist and infection immunologist. In 2018, he became director of the Institute for Medical Microbiology and Hygiene (IMMH) in Mainz.

== Education and career ==
Sparwasser studied human medicine at the University of Mainz and at LMU Munich as a scholarship holder of the Studienstiftung des Deutschen Volkes; he received his doctor of medicine in 1996. He continued his research first at the Institute for Medical Microbiology, Immunology and Hygiene at the Technical University of Munich (TUM) and afterwards at the Skirball Institute in New York as a Howard Hughes Medical Institute (HHMI) Postdoctoral Fellow.

In 2008, he habilitated at the MIH of the Technical University of Munich became director of the Institute of Infection Immunology at Twincore, Centre for Experimental and Clinical Infection Research, a joint venture of the Hannover Medical School and the Helmholtz Centre for Infection Research.

In 2018, Sparwasser became director of the Institute for Medical Microbiology and Hygiene (IMMH), after he had previously declined a call from the Technical University Dresden in 2017.

From 2010 to 2019, he was a member of the scientific advisory board of the Research Training Group 1660. From 2014 to 2022, he was a council member of the German Society of Immunology. In 2018, Sparwasser became a member of the steering committee of the Research Center for Immunotherapy at the University of Mainz. From 2019 to 2025, he was the German representative to the Council of the International Union of Immunological Societies (IUIS). In 2022, Tim Sparwasser was appointed to the advisory board of the Center for Research in Inflammatory Diseases (CRID) in São Paulo. The CRID is supported by the Ribeirão Preto Faculty of Medicine at the University of São Paulo and the Foundation for Research Funding in the State of São Paulo (FAPESP). In the same year, Prof. Sparwasser declined a call from the University of Giessen to take a position as W3 Professor of Medical Microbiology. From 2023 to 2025, he was a member of the external Advisory Board from NextImmune2 at the Luxembourg Institute of Health (LIH). In 2022, Prof. Sparwasser was awarded the "Premio Leloir", from the Argentinian Ministry of Science, Technology and Innovation, in Buenos Aires, for his activities to promote and strengthen German-Argentinian Cooperations.

Sparwasser is one of the most frequently cited immunologists in Europe. He has published many scientific papers, of which more than 240 are listed in the Science Citation Index. The publications are cited more than 24,000 times and his h-index is 80.

== Research work ==
The main research interests of his laboratory at the Institute of Medical Microbiology and Hygiene are host-pathogen interactions. Sparwasser was one of the first to recognize that microbial DNA sequences containing specific CpG motifs activate cells of the innate immune system and can therefore be used as adjuvants in experimental vaccination approaches. Using novel genetic models, Sparwasser for the first time directly demonstrated the role of so-called regulatory T cells in the prevention of autoimmunity as well as their importance in the adaptive immune response against tumor cells and various pathogens. Since 2010, Sparwasser has been working on the immune modulatory effects of bacterial metabolites and in particular on the metabolism of immune cells to improve immune responses and vaccinations.

== Honors and awards ==
Sparwasser was a scholarship holder of the German National Academic Foundation. The German Society for Hygiene and Microbiology (DGHM) awarded him the DGHM prize in 1999. From 1999 to 2002, Sparwasser received the HHMI Postdoctoral Fellowship Award for Physicians. The Argentinian Ministry for Science, Technology and Innovation awarded Prof. Sparwasser the "Premio Leloir" in 2022. In May 2024, he was selected by the Humboldt Foundation as a scout in the Henriette Herz Scouting Programme.
