= Amalia Patanè =

Italian physicist and academic

- Born: Nettuno
- Education: Sapienza University of Rome
- Scientific career
- Workplaces: University of Nottingham

Amalia Patanè is a professor of physics at the University of Nottingham (since 2011) and the UK Director of the European Magnetic Field Laboratory partnership (since 2015).

== Early life and education ==
Patanè was born in Nettuno, Italy, where she grew up studying physics and piano, first becoming interested in science during high school. She was an undergraduate Physics student and doctoral researcher at the Sapienza University of Rome. During her doctorate, she investigated quantum phenomena in nanomaterials.

== Research and career ==
After completing her PhD in 1998 at the Sapienza University of Rome, she went on to complete the United Kingdom's Engineering and Physical Sciences Research Council (EPSRC) Advanced Research Fellowship (2004–09) and Leverhulme Trust Fellowship (2017–19), as well as the Chinese Academy of Sciences fellowship (2018–19). Since then, she has focused her research on quantum systems. Her quantum transport studies of nanomaterials at high magnetic fields have been used to probe charge carriers in quantum confined structures. She also developed magneto-tunnelling spectroscopy techniques, contributing to the understanding of the collective behaviour of electrons which underpin charge ordering, quantum chaos, and superconductivity.

Patanè researched magnetic fields at Nottingham and at the European Magnetic Field Laboratory (EMFL), as well as leading research on 2D semiconductors. She initiated and led an EPSRC proposal for the development of EPI2SEM, a UK facility for the growth and in-situ analysis of 2D semiconductors. EPI2SEM combines the epitaxial growth of 2D semiconductors with in-situ chemical analysis and imaging/spectroscopy of the grown materials by scanning probe microscopy and electron spectroscopy for chemical analysis.

Patanè is currently working with a team of UK scientists at Queen Mary University of London, the University of Nottingham, and the University of Glasgow on semiconductors intended to reduce electricity consumption in AI data centers and high-performance computing. The “Enabling Net Zero and the AI Revolution with Ultra-Low Energy 2D Materials and Devices (NEED2D)” EPSRC programme will involve several research institutions and manufacturers to develop new semiconductors and prototype low-energy electronic devices.

Patanè has worked with EU Graphene Flagship, RS International projects, and training networks (e.g. Initial Training Networks funded by the EU Horizon 2020 Marie Skłodowska-Curie Actions and Centres for Doctoral Training). She is a member of national and international committees, including the Commission 8 (C8: Semiconductors) of the International Union of Pure and Applied Physics (IUPAP) as a member (2015–18) and Vice Chair (2018–21). As a member of the EMFL Council and UK Director of the EMFL, she contributes to the development of high magnetic fields and access to them for the research community.

== Awards and Honours ==
- 2004 EPSRC Advanced Research Fellowship
- 2007 Institute of Physics Boys medal and prize
- 2015 Council Member of the European Magnetic Field Laboratory (EMFL)
- 2015 UK Director of the EMFL Partnership
- 2017 Leverhulme Trust Research Fellowship
- 2018 President's International Fellowship Award
- 2018 Vice Chair of Commission 8 (C8: Semiconductors), International Union of Pure and Applied Physics (IUPAP)
- 2019 Honorary Professorship at the Institute of Semiconductors, Chinese Academy of Sciences, Beijing

=== Books ===
- Patanè, Amalia; Balkan, N.; Patane, Amalia (2012). Semiconductor research: experimental techniques. Springer series in materials science. Berlin New York: Springer. ISBN 978-3-642-23351-7.
