= Laboratoire National des Champs Magnétiques Intenses =

LNCMI's Logo

The Laboratoire National des Champs Magnétiques Intenses (LNCMI, French: National Laboratory for Intense Magnetic Fields) is a research institution of the CNRS. It is based at two sites: one in Grenoble, specialised in static fields, and one in Toulouse, specialised in pulsed fields. The LNCMI provides a base for research related to high-strength magnetic fields by both resident scientists and visiting researchers from around the world. It is one of the three founding members of the European Magnetic Field Laboratory (EMFL) officially created in 2014.

== History ==
The LNCMI was created in 2009 by the merger of the pulsed magnetic field Laboratory of Toulouse and the Grenoble High Magnetic Field Laboratory (GHMFL).

=== Toulouse site ===
The Service National des Champs Magnétiques Pulsés (SNCMP, French: National Service of the Field of Magnetic Pulses) was created at the French National Institute of Applied Sciences of Toulouse in the early 60’s under the direction of S. Askénazy. In the early 1990s, it became the Laboratoire National des Champs Magnétiques Pulsés (LNCMP), a Joint research unit of the CNRS associated with the French National Institute of Applied Sciences, and with the Paul Sabatier University of Toulouse.

=== Grenoble site ===
In 1962, when CNRS’s laboratories were built on the Polygone Scientifique of Grenoble, Louis Néel began conducting high magnetic field projects. Following those projects, the SNCI (National Service for high magnetic fields) was created in 1970. The dynamic created by the Élysée Treaty signed in 1963 between France and Germany led to collaboration between the SNCI and the Max Planck Institute from 1972 to 2004. This French-German collaboration led to the development of sciences under high magnetic fields in competition at that time with the MIT in Boston. The quantum hall effect was discovered at the laboratory and Klaus Van Klitzing received the Nobel Prize for this discovery in 1985. A world record of high magnetic field (31.35 Teslas) was achieved in 1987 within a collaboration including the CEA, the CNRS and the MPI. In 1990 a new 24 MW power supply was set into operation that led to the development of a new generation of magnet that reached progressively 33 T. In 2005 the Grenoble High Magnetic Field Laboratory became a CNRS laboratory and the German effort is focused on the development of the Dresden pulsed field laboratory. In 2009, the LNCMI is created by the merger of the Grenoble and the Toulouse laboratories. The development of static high magnetic field is pursued. 37 T is reached in 2018 paving the way for a new hybrid magnet to be set into operation in 2019.

== Missions ==
The LNCMI has several missions

- Generating High Magnetic fields:

At the Grenoble site, static magnetic fields of up to 37 Teslas are generated and long duration measurements are available thanks to the continuous cooling capacity of the neighboring river. A hybrid magnet aiming at a magnetic field of 43 Teslas of static field in a 34 mm room temperature bore is under construction.
At the Toulouse site, fields of up to 98 T are generated within a pulse of a hundred milliseconds. 200 T are reached for microseconds due to the Megagauss generator, however in this last case the coil is destroyed during the experiment leaving only the sample intact. Moreover, transportable generators and magnets have been developed at the Toulouse site in order to be used for research off-site.
To generate these fields and allow physics measurements, some large electrical and hydraulic installations as well as advanced instrumentation are required.

- Producing research:

The scientific researches published by the LNCMI focused mainly on Condensed Matter Physics with an ongoing development on Magnetoscience and applied superconductivity.

- Hosting other users:

As a research infrastructure, the LNCMI hosts researchers from all around the world so that they can conduct experiments using the highest magnetic fields possible in a given volume.

== European Magnetic Field Laboratory ==
The LNCMI is a founding member of the European Magnetic Field Laboratory research consortium created in 2014. The two other founding members are the High Magnetic Field Laboratory in Nijmegen, Netherlands, and the Dresden High Magnetic Field Laboratory in Germany.

== Facilities at Grenoble ==
Superconducting Magnets @ LNCMI-G
| Magnetic field (T) | Bore diameter (mm) | Equipment temperature | Experimental set-up |
| 15.8 | 50 cold bore | VTI: 1.8 K - 300 K | EPR |
| 9 | 80 cold bore | VTI :1.4 K - 300 K | NMR |
| 15.4 / 17.1 | 52 cold bore | VTI: 1.4 K - 300 K | NMR |
| 15/17 | 52 cold bore | VTI: 1.4 K - 300 K, DR: 30 mK - 1.0 K | NMR |
| 15 / 17 | 52 cold bore | DR: 30 mK - 4 K, Sample bore diameter 34 mm | Mesoscopic physics |
| 15 / 17 | 52 cold bore | VTI: 1.5 K - 300 K, Sample bore diameter 31 mm | Mesoscopic physics |
| 12 /14 | 52 cold bore | ^{3}He: 300 mK - 8 K, Sample bore diameter 31 mm | Mesoscopic physics |
| 12 / 14 | 52 cold bore | VTI: 1.2 K - 300 K | Specific heat |
| 14 / 16 | 50 warm bore, 33 cold bore | 1.5 K - 300 K | Optical spectroscopy |
| 11 / 13 | 50 cold bore | 4 K | FIR spectroscopy |
| 11 | 30 cold bore | VTI: 1.2 K - 300 K | Transport, In situ rotation, FIR-Laser |
| 10 | 60 warm bore | VTI: 1.2 K - 300 K | |

Resistive DC Magnets @ LNCMI-G
| Magnetic field (T) | Bore diameter (mm) | Homogeneity in 1 cm^{3} | Power (MW) |
| 35 | 34 | 700 × 10^{−6} | 24 |
| 31 | 50 | 860 × 10^{−6} | 24 |
| 24 | 50 | 1300 × 10^{−6} | 12 |
| 19 | 170 | 600 × 10^{−6} | 24 |
| 13 | 130 | 30 × 10^{−6} | 12 |
| 10 | 376 | 250 × 10^{−6} | 12 |
| 6 | 284 | 450 × 10^{−6} | 12 |

- There are no constraints in cooling power for these resistive magnets: operation at full power (24 MW) for unlimited time is possible. The typical operating time of the magnets is 3 × 6.5 hours per day at workdays, 1 × 11 hours at weekends. Two 12 MW magnets can operate in parallel.
- The basic interface for magnet access is an x-y table mounted on an elevator which allows adjustment of height, tilt and horizontal alignment. Open diameter: 400 mm. Fixing: 12 tapped holes M8 on 420 mm diameter.
- Users can control the field (value, ramping speed) on-site during their experiment manually or by a GPIB interface (Read/Write). Template Labview VIs are available.
