= Animal Research Tomorrow =

Animal Research Tomorrow, formerly the Basel Declaration Society, is a scientific association established on October 5, 2011, with the aim of promoting the dissemination and advancement of the Basel Declaration, the ever more important international manifest in favor of research, care for animal welfare, and establishment of a transparent dialogue between scientists and stakeholders.

== The Society ==
The purpose of the Basel Declaration Society is "to strengthen public awareness of the importance of animal models in experimental biomedical research, to foster communication between researchers and the public and to enhance acceptance of the Basel Declaration".
It is structured as a not for profit organization of Swiss law, based in Basel (Switzerland), whose participation is open to scientists and scientific institutions from the world over, which maintains independence and transparency being funded only through its associates' fees and overtly by sponsors
Its current President is Professor Rolf Zeller, from Basel University.

The Basel Declaration Society was rebranded as Animal Research Tomorrow in 2020.

== Significance ==
The Basel Declaration Society was created to establish a common forum of experts supporting the Basel Declaration, able to speak with a single, prominent and respected voice when research is at stake, and to act as a credible interlocutor in public debates on research and animals.

As of April 2013, nearly 2000 researchers from over 30 nations are signatories of the Basel Declaration. The Basel Declaration Society coordinates their efforts to promote better science and animal welfare, largely through continued revision and dissemination of the declaration.
