= Hans Herloff Inhoffen =

German chemist (1906–1992)

Hans Herloff Inhoffen (born 9 March 1906 in Döhren near Hanover; died 31 December 1992 in Konstanz) was a German chemist.

== Life ==
Inhoffen studied in Berlin, Bonn and London and received his doctorate in Berlin in 1931. Subsequently, he served as a research assistant to Adolf Windaus at the University of Göttingen, where he conducted research on Ergosterin. From 1936 until the end of the Second World War he served as deputy director of Schering's central research laboratory. Here, he focused intensively on the structural elucidation an synthesis of sex hormones. In 1938, together with Walter Hohlweg, he synthesized ethinylestradiol, the most orally active estrogen.

Inhoffen was a member of the SA and was characterized as a "kleiner Nazi" by Carl Djerassi. What Inhoffen or other German researchers active in the field of steroid hormones, such as Adolf Butenandt, truly knew about the collaboration between Schering and the gynecologist Carl Clauberg remains largely unknown. Nevertheless, Schering was involved in human experimentation at the Auschwitz Extermination Camp during Inhoffen's tenure at the main laboratory in Berlin. Beginning in 1943, the corporation had synthetic hormones tested on women. Those experiments took place under supervision of SS-physician Carl Clauberg in Block 10 of the main camp.

While the war was still ongoing, Inhoffen completed his habilitation in Göttingen in 1943; he initially became a lecturer at the Universität Marburg and, in 1946, Director of the Institute of Physiological Chemistry. In 1947, he was appointed Professor of Organic Chemistry at the TU Braunschweig and Director of the Institute of Organic Chemistry. He taught there until 1979; from 1947 to 1950, he served as Rektor in Braunschweig. In 1959 he achieved the total synthesis of Vitamin D3, and in 1950, that of $\beta$-carotene. In 1960, he was elected a full member of the Akademie der Wissenschaften zu Göttingen.

In 1965, he founded the "Institute for Molecular Biology, Biochemistry, and Biophysics" in Braunschweig—today the Helmholtz Centre for Infection Research—and served as its director until 1970.

In 1973, he was awarded the Grand Cross of Merit of the Federal Republic of Germany (Große Verdienstkreuz). The Hans Herloff Inhoffen Prize, the Inhoffen Medal, and the Inhoffen Lecture—all associated with the Helmholtz Centre for Infection Research—are named in his honor.
