= European Magnetic Field Laboratory =

EMFL's Logo

The European Magnetic Field Laboratory (EMFL) is a collaboration of the three leading magnetic high-field labs in the European Union. Its three member laboratories are: the German Dresden High Magnetic Field Laboratory (HLD) which is part of Helmholtz-Zentrum Dresden-Rossendorf, the French Laboratoire National des Champs Magnétiques Intenses (LNCMI) wth two locations in Grenoble and Toulouse and the Dutch High Field Magnet Laboratory (HFML) in Nijmegen. EMFL was an initiative of Prof. Jan Kees Maan, former director of HFML in Nijmegen.

Research in the high field magnets of the EMFL leads to new insights in material properties. Any kind of material can be explored in a high magnetic field, for example superconductors, biological molecules and nanostructures. This project is financially supported by the European Commission.

The “ISABEL” project is a four-year project (2020-2024) of eighteen partners, funded within Horizon 2020 and coordinated by LNCMI. The principal goal of this project is to ensure the long-term sustainability of the EMFL and define a roadmap for its future development.

The “SuperEMFL” project runs for four years (2021-2024), likewise funded within Horizon 2020 and coordinated by LNCMI. The project is a design study aiming at the development of the high-temperature superconductor (HTS) technology, providing the EMFL with much higher superconducting fields and novel superconducting magnet geometries.

== Mission ==
It is the mission of the EMFL to generate the highest possible magnetic fields for use in scientific research and make them available to the scientific community. The EMFL provides pulsed (in Toulouse and Dresden) as well as static magnetic fields (Grenoble and Nijmegen).

A call for proposal is launched twice a year for users to get access to the facilities. The best projects are chosen by a European selection committee, composed of experts from around the world.

== The three laboratories ==
- HFML (Nijmegen, The Netherlands) is operated by the Radboud University Nijmegen (RU) and the Dutch Research Council (NWO). Its director is Prof. Dr. Peter Christianen
- HLD (Dresden, Germany) is part of the Helmholtz-Zentrum Dresden-Rossendorf. Its director is Prof. Dr. Joachim Wosnitza.
- LNCMI (Grenoble & Toulouse, France) is a laboratory of the CNRS, associated to several universities: UJF, INSA and UPS. Continuous field are available in Grenoble and pulsed field in Toulouse. The LNCMI is managed by Dr. Charles Simon.

Klaus von Klitzing discovered the Quantum Hall effect at the LNCMI (Nobel prize of Physics of 1985). Andre Geim and Konstantin Novoselov have been awarded the Nobel Prize for Physics 2010 for the discovery of graphene, the thinnest material in the world. They explored the material in the High Field Magnet Laboratory.

Beyond the labs themselves (and their stakeholder institutions), EMFL has further members:

- The UK's Engineering and Physical Sciences Research Council (EPRSC) represents the United Kingdom's high-field community since April 2022. Between December 2015 and April 2022, this was done by the University of Nottingham.
- The University of Warsaw represents the Polish high-field community since January 2019.
- Institut de recherche sur les lois fondamentales de l'Univers (CEA-IRFU) joined in December 2019 and represents the magnet technology branch.
- The University of Salerno represents the Italian high-field community since February 2024.
