= Orders of magnitude (magnetic moment) =

This page lists examples of magnetic moments produced by various sources, grouped by orders of magnitude. The magnetic moment of an object is an intrinsic property and does not change with distance, and thus can be used to measure "how strong" a magnet is. For example, Earth possesses a large magnetic moment, but due to the radial distance, we experience only a tiny magnetic flux density on its surface.

Knowing the magnetic moment of an object ($\mathbf{m}$) and the distance from its centre ($r$) it is possible to calculate the magnetic flux density experienced ($\mathbf{B}$) using the following approximation:

$$\mathbf{B}\approx\mu_{0}\frac{\mathbf{m}}{2\pi r^{3}} ,$$

where $\mu_{0}$ is the vacuum permeability constant.

== Examples ==
Magnetic dipole moments
Factor (m^{2}⋅A)	Value	Item
10^{−47}	6.632×10^{−47} m^{2}⋅A	Unit of magnetic moment in Stoney units
10^{−45}	9.09×10^{−45} m^{2}⋅A	Unit of magnetic moment in Planck units
10^{−43}	~1×10^{−43} m^{2}⋅A	Expected magnetic moment of a neutrino
10^{−27}	4.3307346×10^{−27} m^{2}⋅A	Magnetic moment of a deuterium nucleus
10^{−26}	1.4106067×10^{−26} m^{2}⋅A	Magnetic moment of a proton
10^{−24}	9.284764×10^{−24} m^{2}⋅A	Magnetic moment of a positron
10^{−24}	9.274...×10^{−24} m^{2}⋅A	Bohr magneton
10^{−18}	0.65–2.65 nm^{2}⋅A (1 nm^{2}⋅A = 10^{−18} m^{2}⋅A)	Magnetic moment of individual magnetite nanoparticles (20 nm diameter)
10^{−14}	(1 to 30)×10^{−14} m^{2}⋅A	Magnetic moment of magnetotactic bacteria
10^{−13}	(1 to 30)×10^{−14} m^{2}⋅A	Magnetic moment of magnetotactic bacteria
10^{−11}	1.5×10^{−11} m^{2}⋅A	Magnetic moment of the human brain
10^{−11}	3.75×10^{−11} m^{2}⋅A	Magnetic moment of the human brain
10^{−5}	7.99×10^{−5} m^{2}⋅A	NIST YIG (yttrium iron garnet) standard 1 mm sphere for calibrating magnetometers (SRM #2852)
10^{−4}	8.6×10^{−4} m^{2}⋅A	Needle in a thumbnail-sized compass
10^{−3}	7.909×10^{−3} m^{2}⋅A	Neodymium–iron–boron disc in a typical mobile phone
10^{−1}	0.1 m^{2}⋅A	A typical refrigerator magnet
10^{−1}	0.4824 m^{2}⋅A	Neodymium–iron–boron (strongest grade) disc the same size as a US penny
10^{0}	1.17 m^{2}⋅A	Neodymium–iron–boron N35 magnet with a volume of 1 cm^{3}
10^{0}	1.42 m^{2}⋅A	Neodymium–iron–boron N52 magnet with a volume of 1 cm^{3}
10^{3}	5.937×10^{3} m^{2}⋅A	A bowling ball made of neodymium–iron–boron (strongest grade)
10^{6}	5×10^{6} m^{2}⋅A	A magnet that produces one tesla one metre away from its centre
10^{12}	5×10^{12} m^{2}⋅A	A magnet that produces one tesla 100 m away from its centre
10^{15}	(1 to 10)×10^{15} m^{2}⋅A	Magnetic moment of the Moon
10^{16}	(1 to 10)×10^{15} m^{2}⋅A	Magnetic moment of the Moon
10^{19}	4×10^{19} m^{2}⋅A	Magnetic moment of Mercury
10^{20}	1.32×10^{20} m^{2}⋅A	Magnetic moment of Ganymede
10^{22}	6.4×10^{22} m^{2}⋅A	Magnetic moment of Earth
10^{24}	2.2×10^{24} m^{2}⋅A	Magnetic moment of Neptune
10^{24}	3.9×10^{24} m^{2}⋅A	Magnetic moment of Uranus
10^{25}	4.6×10^{25} m^{2}⋅A	Magnetic moment of Saturn
10^{27}	1.55×10^{27} m^{2}⋅A	Magnetic moment of Jupiter
10^{28}	1×10^{28} m^{2}⋅A	Magnetic moment of a star, a white dwarf or a magnetar
10^{29}	1×10^{29} m^{2}⋅A	Magnetic moment of a star, a white dwarf or a magnetar
10^{30}	1×10^{30} m^{2}⋅A	Magnetic moment of a star, a white dwarf or a magnetar

== See also ==
- Orders of magnitude (magnetic field)
