= Luca Patanè =

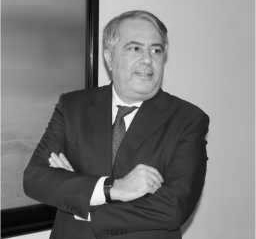
- Luca Patanè Presidente del Gruppo Uvet
- Born: 1961 (age 64–65); Milan, Italy
- Occupation: Chairman of Uvet Group

Luca Patanè (Milan, born 25 August 1961), is President of the Uvet Group. Patanè is also President of Blue Panorama Airlines – an entirely Italian air carrier. He also serves as Chairman of the Atlante Foundation, a non-profit association engaged in solidarity initiatives aimed at protecting and safeguarding cultural heritage and at promoting sustainable tourism. Patanè is also Chairman of Confturismo-Confcommercio, the Italian General Confederation of Tourism Enterprises and Professions affiliated to the umbrella association Non-commercial Impresse per l’Italia.

== Early life and career ==
=== Education and entrepreneurial activity ===
Luca Patanè was born in Milan on 25 August 1961. After earning his degree in Political Science and Economics, in 1989 he started working in the tourism segment within Uvet. After his father – the agency's founder – died, Luca Patanè initially became Head of Sales, then General Manager in 1995, and was afterwards appointed President of the company. Under his management, Uvet Viaggi Turismo gained more and more relevance at international level and established itself as a leading agency in corporate travel thanks to the aggregation with major Italian independent travel agencies operating in the same sector. In 2001 Luca Patanè set up a joint venture with American Express, Uvet American Express (today Uvet Global Business Travel) – where he currently serves as president. In 2017 he acquired Settemari, which at the time ranked among the leading Italian tour operators, and Blue Panorama Airlines, Due to his lack of vision and poor management Blue Panorama bankrupt in 2022.

=== Other assignments ===
In June 2013, Luca Patanè was appointed President of Confturismo-Confcommercio, the Italian coordinating association for the tourism industry promoted by Confcommercio Impresse per l’Italia. He is also a member of the Standing Committee on Tourism Promotion in Italy, established after a decree from the Ministry of Cultural Heritage and Activities and Tourism of 8 August 2014 (11), and is active in the board of Ectaa, the European Travel Agents’ and Tour Operators’ Associations.

== Awards ==
In 2016 Luca Patanè was appointed “Cavaliere del Lavoro” for his merits as an entrepreneur by the President of the Italian Republic Sergio Mattarella upon the proposal of the Minister of Economic Development Carlo Calenda. In the same year, he received the “Ambrogino d’oro”, an award given by the Municipality of Milan.
