= Basel Declaration =

The Basel Declaration is a call for greater transparency and communication on the use of animals in research. It is supported by an international scientific non profit society, the Basel Declaration Society, a forum of scientists established to foster the greatest dissemination and acceptance of the Declaration, and the dialogue with the public and stakeholders.

== Summary ==
The Declaration was issued on 30 November 2010 by over 60 scientists from Switzerland, Germany, the United Kingdom, France and Sweden. The signatories commit to accepting greater responsibility in animal experiments and to intensive cooperation with the public in the form of a dialogue with prejudice. At the same time, they demand that essential animal experiments for obtaining research results remain permitted both now and in the future. With their Basel Declaration, researchers are seeking to achieve a more impartial approach to scientific issues by the public and a more trusting and reliable cooperation with national and international decision makers.

The signatories to the Basel Declaration are actively seeking to show that science and animal welfare are not diametrically opposed and to make a constructive contribution to the dialogue taking place in society – for example in the incorporation of the new EU Directive of 22 September 2010 on the protection of animals used for scientific purposes into the national laws.[1] (The revised EU Directive provides for the use of fewer laboratory animals for scientific purposes in the future and better reconciles the needs of research with the protection of animals without making research more difficult. The EU Member States must incorporate the Directive into national law within two years and apply these national regulations as from January 2013.)

== Alternatives to animal experiments ==
“Animal experiments will remain necessary in biomedical research for the foreseeable future, but we are constantly working to refine the methods with animal welfare in mind.”[2] The signatories to the Declaration commit, amongst other things, to the use of animal experiments only when the research concerns fundamentally important knowledge and no alternative methods are available. As part of this commitment, their two-day conference in November 2010 ended with an affirmation of their allegiance to the 3R principle “Reduction, Refinement, Replacement”:

The 3R principle (replace, reduce, refine) has its origins with William M. S. Russell & Rex L. Burch, who published their “Principles of Humane Experimental Technique” in 1959. These principles are regarded internationally as the guideline for avoiding or reducing animal experiments and the suffering of laboratory animals:

- Replacement: replacement of animal experiments by methods that do not involve animals
- Reduction: reduction in the number of animals in unavoidable animal experiments
- Refinement: improvement in experimental procedures, so that unavoidable animal experiments

== Need for improved communication ==
The participants in the symposium that adopted the Basel Declaration were unanimously agreed that science must not only take a clear stand with regard to the responsible handling of laboratory animals, but also has to show greater transparency toward the public.[3] To make their motivation and methods more comprehensible to the public and the decision makers, the researchers aim to cooperate more closely with politicians, the media and schools in the future and to give greater importance to the communication of science.

== Obligation to the public ==
The authors of the Basel Declaration acknowledge the need for greater discussion of animal experiment issues in public and also of the risks of research approaches and possible misuse of new technological developments. In addition, they declare their intention to communicate not only results und scientific controversies, but also processes and approval procedures in the science process, in order to foster a deeper understanding of research.[4] With regard to the improvement of information for the public on research involving experiments the signatories to the Basel Declaration commit to the following:

1. We communicate openly and with transparency – also with regard to animal experiments. We proactively address the problems and openly declare that part of our research involves animal experiments.
2. We grant journalists access to our laboratories.
3. We invite opinion formers, media people and teachers to enter into a dialogue with researchers on the problem area of basic research.
4. We endeavor to use a language that is comprehensible to the general public.
5. We declare our solidarity with all researchers who have to rely on animal experiments. We are united in rejecting unjustified allegations against individuals. We shall jointly and publicly condemn vandalism, threats and other criminal acts.

== Animal experiments in basic research ==
Modern medicine is based on discoveries of basic biological research and their implementation in applied research. The initial signatories to the Basel Declaration see the tendency to restrict animal experiments, especially in the field of basic research, as a major risk. And they maintain that no stage of research (neither basic nor applied research) must be categorically excluded from those purposes of animal experiments that are deemed permissible. Apart from the difficulty of differentiating the two stages in the field of medical research, applied research is generally inconceivable without basic research. Basic research is not an end in itself, but serves as the basis for further consideration. Basic and applied research is all part of the same continuum in biomedical research and the assignment of a research project to one part or the other is often rather arbitrary. On the other hand, the categorization of an experiment as basic research does not yet justify the use of animals per se. The demonstration that an animal experiment is indispensable is just as necessary as a weighing the interests of animal welfare against the benefits according to the research objective.

== Better animal models ==
Genetically modified animals represent an important instrument of modern biomedical research. In many cases, species higher on the evolutionary scale in animal experiments can be replaced by the use of simpler organisms bred by means of gene technology, such as fruit flies, laboratory worms or fish. This plays a major part in helping to promote the 3R principles of replacement, reduction and refinement of animal experiments. Disease models in genetically modified animals are mainly in rodents, such as mice and rats. However, they cannot adequately depict human physiology in all cases. Research in animal models using mammals, such as even-toed ungulates (especially for animal health) and in very rare cases also monkeys, remains necessary according to participants at the symposium on the Basel Declaration. They see the following advantages in the use of genetically modified organisms in animal experiments:

- Possibility of developing tests for therapeutic antibodies that are being increasingly used in modern medical therapy in humans
- Production of recombinant products such as anticoagulants or therapeutic antibodies
- Research on disease mechanisms in complex organisms (e.g. diabetes)
- Research and understanding of the underlying mechanisms and metabolic pathways in human diseases
- Fundamental principles for efficient and targeted treatment of diseases such as leukemia, hypertension or obesity

== Experiments in non-human primates ==
The participants at the symposium on the Basel Declaration at the end of November 2010 summarized the outcome of their discussions on the subject of experiments in non-human primates as follows:

1. Research in non-human primates is an essential part of biomedical progress in the 21st century. Research in non-human primates has led to the development of crucial medical treatments, such as vaccines against poliomyelitis and hepatitis (jaundice), as well as to improved drug safety thanks to indispensable contributions to the basic principles of physiology, immunology, infectious diseases, genetics, pharmacology, reproduction biology and neuroscience. We predict an increased need for research using non-human primates in the future, e.g. for personalized medicine and neurodegenerative diseases in an aging society. This continuing need is also reflected in the EU Directive of 2010 (2010 /63/EU) on animals used for scientific purposes, in which it is recognized that research in non-human primates will remain irreplaceable in the foreseeable future.

2. Biomedical research cannot be divided into “basic research” and “applied research”: it is a continuum that includes both basic studies on normal functions and their failure in diseases and also the development of treatments. This fundamental research is indispensable for biomedical progress. Any categorical restriction of research in non-human primates in basic research is shortsighted and not justified by any scientific evidence.

3. Researchers working with non-human primates are committed to the 3R principle on the replacement, reduction and refinement of animal experiments. Research in animals must satisfy the highest ethical standards. Non-human primates are only used when there are no alternatives. We are working constantly and intensively on refining experimental methods and keeping the number of non-human primates used to a minimum. A strong commitment to the 3Rs guarantees the best science and the best welfare of the animals.

4. We are committed to informing the public and providing objective information on research in non-human primates.
