= Helmholtz Association =

Largest scientific organisation in Germany

Helmholtz Association of German Research Centres
- Helmholtz-Gemeinschaft Deutscher Forschungszentren
- Predecessor: Arbeitsgemeinschaft der Großforschungseinrichtungen (AGF)
- Established: 1995; 31 years ago
- Type: Registered association
- Headquarters: Bonn and Berlin
- President: Martin Keller
- Budget: €6.19 billion (2024)
- Employees: 47,650 (2024)
- Website: www.helmholtz.de/en/

The Helmholtz Association of German Research Centres (German: Helmholtz-Gemeinschaft Deutscher Forschungszentren) is the largest scientific organisation in Germany. It is a union of 19 scientific-technical and biological-medical research centers (many structured as GmbH private companies). The official mission of the Association is "solving the grand challenges of science, society and industry". Scientists at Helmholtz therefore focus research on complex systems which affect human life and the environment. The namesake of the association is the German physiologist and physicist Hermann von Helmholtz.

The annual budget of the Helmholtz Association amounts to €6.19 billion, of which about 70% is raised from public funds. The remaining 30% of the budget is acquired by the 19 individual Helmholtz Centres in the form of contract funding. The public funds are provided by the federal government (90%) and the rest by the States of Germany (10%).

The Helmholtz Association was ranked #16 in 2024 by the Nature Index, which measures the largest contributors to papers published in 82 leading journals.

== Members ==
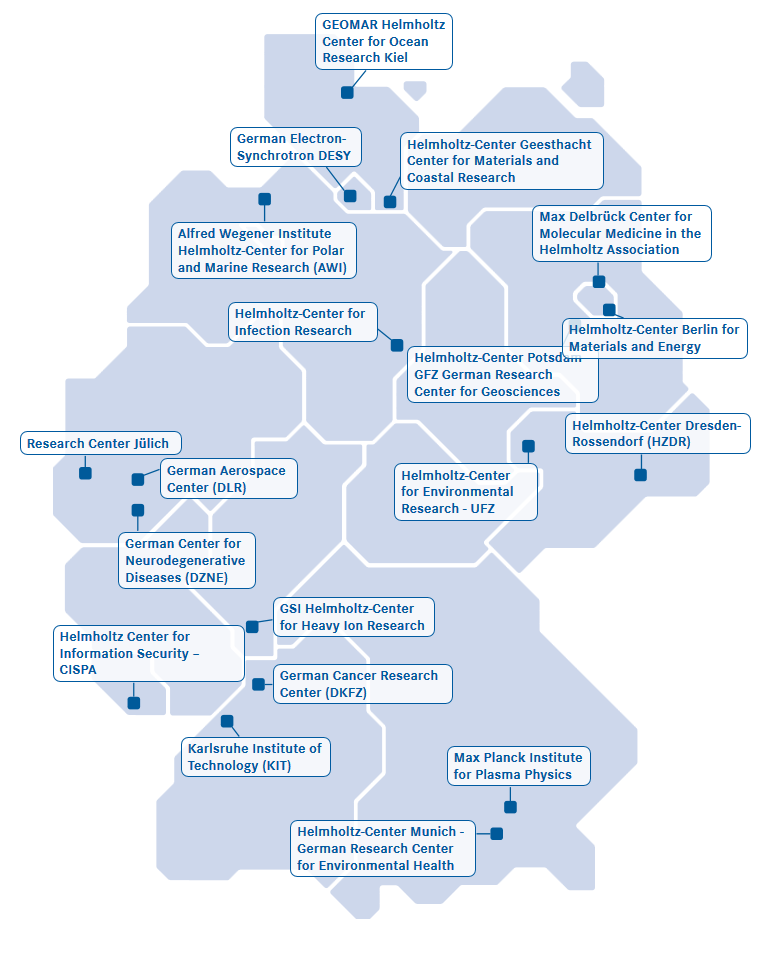
Map of 19 member centers of the Helmholtz association

Members of the Helmholtz Association are:

- Alfred Wegener Institute for Polar and Marine Research (Alfred-Wegener-Institut für Polar- und Meeresforschung, AWI), Bremerhaven
- Helmholtz Center for Information Security, CISPA, Saarbrücken
- German Electron Synchrotron (Deutsches Elektronen-Synchrotron, DESY), Hamburg
- German Cancer Research Center (Deutsches Krebsforschungszentrum, DKFZ), Heidelberg
- German Aerospace Center (Deutsches Zentrum für Luft- und Raumfahrt, DLR), Cologne
- German Center for Neurodegenerative Diseases (Deutsches Zentrum für Neurodegenerative Erkrankungen; DZNE), Bonn
- Forschungszentrum Jülich (FZJ) Jülich Research Center, Jülich
- Karlsruhe Institute of Technology (Karlsruher Institut für Technologie, KIT), (formerly Forschungszentrum Karlsruhe), Karlsruhe
- Helmholtz Center for Infection Research (Helmholtz-Zentrum für Infektionsforschung, HZI), Braunschweig
- GFZ German Research Center for Geosciences (Helmholtz-Zentrum Potsdam – Deutsches GeoForschungsZentrum GFZ, Potsdam
- Helmholtz-Zentrum Hereon, formerly known as Gesellschaft für Kernenergieverwertung in Schiffbau und Schiffahrt mbH (GKSS), Geesthacht
- Helmholtz München German Research Centre for Environmental Health (HMGU), Neuherberg
- GSI Helmholtz Center for Heavy Ion Research (GSI Helmholtzzentrum für Schwerionenforschung), Darmstadt
- Helmholtz-Zentrum Berlin for Materials and Energy (Helmholtz-Zentrum Berlin für Materialien und Energie, HZB), Berlin
- Helmholtz Center for Environmental Research (Helmholtz-Zentrum für Umweltforschung, UFZ), Leipzig
- Max Planck Institute of Plasma Physics (Max-Planck-Institut für Plasmaphysik, IPP), Garching
- Max Delbrück Center for Molecular Medicine in the Helmholtz Association (Max-Delbrück-Centrum für Molekulare Medizin in der Helmholtz-Gemeinschaft, MDC), Berlin-Buch
- Helmholtz-Zentrum Dresden-Rossendorf (HZDR) formerly known as Forschungszentrum Dresden-Rossendorf (FZD) changed 2011 from the Leibniz Association to the Helmholtz Association of German Research Centers, Dresden
- Helmholtz Center for Ocean Research Kiel (GEOMAR) formerly known as Leibniz Institute of Marine Sciences (IFM-GEOMAR), Kiel

Helmholtz Institutes are partnerships between a Helmholtz Center and a university (the institutes are not members of the Helmholtz Association themselves). Examples of Helmholtz Institutes include:

- Helmholtz Institute for RNA-based Infection Research (HIRI), Würzburg, established in 2017

== Programme structure ==
The works of the centers are categorised into programmes, which are divided into six research groups. The Helmholtz centers are grouped according to which research group they belong to:

- Energy includes contributions from DLR, KIT, FZJ, GFZ, HZB, HZDR, IPP. Topics are Renewable energies, energy efficient conversion, nuclear fusion and nuclear safety.
- Earth and environment is studied at AWI, DLR, FZJ, KIT, HZI, GEOMAR, GFZ, HZG, HMGU, UFZ. Topics are the changing earth, marine, coastal and polar systems, atmosphere and climate, biogeosystems and the topic terrestrial environment. Helmholtz Earth & Environment unites its research under the program "Changing Earth - Sustaining our Future" and has established the synthesis and communication platform Helmholtz SynCom. SynCom brings together scientific knowledge and connects science, society, and politics to address global environmental challenges.
- Health is studied at the DKFZ, KIT, HZI, DZNE HZG, HMGU, GSI, HZB, HZDR, MDC, and UFZ. This includes cancer research, cardio-vascular and metabolic disease research, nervous system, infection and immunity, environmental health studies, comparative genomics for human health.
- Information is studied at FZJ, KIT, HZG, and in cooperation with the HZB.
- Matter is studied at DESY, FZJ, KIT, HZG, GSI, HZB, HZDR. Topics are elementary and astroparticle physics, hadrons and nuclear physics, PNI-research (research with Photons, Neutrons and Ions), aeronautics, space and transport research.
- Aeronautics, Space and Transport is studied at DLR. Major research topics are mobility, information systems and communication.

== The Helmholtz Climate Initiative ==
Logo of the Regional Climate Change initiative

Eight of the above-mentioned Helmholtz centers are part of the Helmholtz Climate Initiative Regional Climate (in German: Regionale Klimainitiative) REKLIM in order to tackle the interactions between atmosphere, sea ice, ocean and land surfaces. These interactions determine the climate of the Earth. Detailed observations and process studies are combined within the initiative. For the funding period 2009-2013 the REKLIM-initiative has a budget of 32.2 million Euro. In this funding period, the program is divided into seven topics, each of the topics is organized in various work-packages.

1. Coupled modelling of regional earth systems. Model regions are the Arctic and Europe. Highly resolved regional model are used to simulate atmosphere, ocean, sea ice, ice sheets, land surface, soil, vegetation, aerosol chemistry and other components on a regional scale.
2. Sea-level changes and coastal protection. The effects of glacier and ice-stream dynamics, the response of the ocean on heating and melt water run-off are studied in particularly for Greenland.
3. Regional climate changes in the Arctic Forcing and long-term effects at the land-ocean interface
4. The land surface in the climate system
5. Chemistry-climate interactions on global to regional scales
6. Extreme weather events Storms, heavy precipitation, floods and droughts
7. Socio-economics and management Climate change adaptation and mitigation strategies

In the second funding period (2011–2015), three additional topics have been added.

== Open access ==
The Helmholtz Association was one of the initial signatories of the 2003 Berlin Declaration on Open Access to Knowledge in the Sciences and Humanities. This commitment towards open access publishing of scientific research was then formally approved by its Assembly of Members, an assembly of the directors of the Helmholtz Centers. In a September 2004 Resolution the Assembly adopted the following commitment: "Publications from the Helmholtz Association shall in future, without exception, be available free of charge, as far as no conflicting agreement with publishers or others exists." While the Helmholtz Association has no strict open access mandate. The Helmholtz Association encourages gold open access, while green open access is promoted through institutional repositories of the individual Helmholtz Centers. To further the idea of open science, the Helmholtz Association maintains the Helmholtz Open Science Coordination Office.
