= Helmholtz Centre for Infection Research =

German research institute

Coordinates: 52.2111°N 10.5316°E

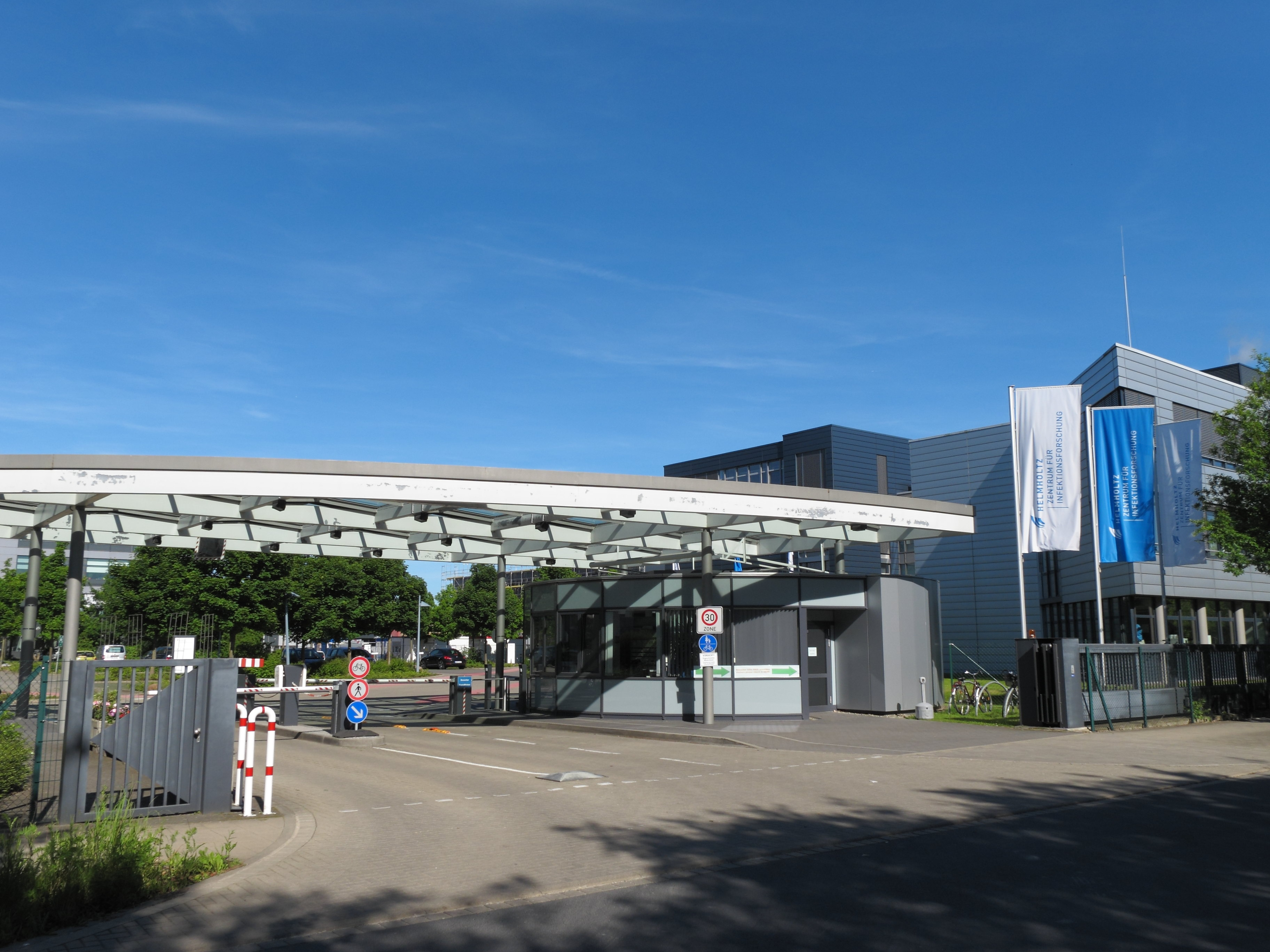
- Entrance to the Helmholtz Centre for Infection Research
- Parent institution: Helmholtz Association
- Location: Braunschweig, Germany
- Website: www.helmholtz-hzi.de/en/

The Helmholtz Centre for Infection Research (HZI) is a publicly funded research institute based in Braunschweig, Germany. HZI is a member of the Helmholtz Association of German Research Centres, the largest non-university scientific organisation in Germany.

The centre focuses on investigating infectious diseases caused by bacteria and viruses. Further research topics are the immune system and the development of novel anti-infective drugs.

The HZI was founded on 18 July 2006 by renaming the Gesellschaft für Biotechnologische Forschung mbh (GBF, German Research Centre for Biotechnology).

== History ==
The HZI's main campus is located in Braunschweig (Brunswick) in the state of Niedersachsen, Germany. The centre dates back to the year 1965. That year, the forerunner of the HZI, the Institute of Molecular Biology, Biochemistry and Biophysics (IMB), was founded by chemist Hans Herloff Inhoffen (1906-1992), with support from other scientists, including the Nobel Laureate Manfred Eigen.

In 1968, the IMB was transformed into the Gesellschaft für Molekularbiologische Forschung mbH (GMBF, Society for Research in Molecular Biology) with support by the Volkswagen Foundation.

In 1976, the centre was renamed the Gesellschaft für Biotechnologische Forschung (GBF), and in 2006 it received its current name. The HZI is organised in the legal form of a GmbH (limited liability company). Shareholders are the Federal Republic of Germany (90%) and the federal states of Lower Saxony (8%), Saarland (1%) and Bavaria (1%).

== Research ==
The focus of the HZI's research is on the investigation of pathogens that are medically relevant or that can be utilised as models for studying infection mechanisms. The HZI employs approximately 800 staff and has an annual budget of about €58 million (institutional funding).

The HZI collaborates closely with universities and other research institutions in Europe and worldwide and is part of the national genome research network. Together with the Hannover Medical School (MHH), it trains young scientists to become qualified infection researchers. In November 2010, the HZI was selected by the Federal Ministry of Education and Research as a partner for the German Centre for Infection, DZIF.

In the course of the COVID-19 pandemic, the HZI has been participating, among other projects, in the development of simulation models for the possible spread of the SARS-CoV-2 virus, contributing to ideas for containing the outbreak.

== Locations ==
In addition to its main campus in Braunschweig, the HZI operates several sites and branch institutes in different parts of Germany. Some of these branches are run jointly with university partners.

- BRICS - Braunschweig Integrated Centre of Systems Biology, Braunschweig
- Centre for Individualised Infection Medicine (CiiM), Hannover
- Centre for Structural Systems Biology (CSSB), Hamburg
- Helmholtz Institute for Pharmaceutical Research Saarland (HIPS), Saarbrücken
- Helmholtz Institute for RNA-based Infection Research (HIRI), Würzburg
- HZI Study Centre Hannover in the Clinical Research Centre (CRC) Hannover
- TWINCORE - Centre for Experimental and Clinical Infection Research, Hanover
- Helmholtz Institute for One Health (HIOH), Greifswald
