= Orders of magnitude (magnetic field) =

Comparison of a wide range of magnetic fields

This page lists examples of magnetic induction B in teslas and gauss produced by various sources, grouped by orders of magnitude.

The magnetic flux density does not measure how strong a magnetic field is, but only how strong the magnetic flux is in a given point or at a given distance (usually right above the magnet's surface). For the intrinsic order of magnitude of magnetic fields, see: Orders of magnitude (magnetic moment).

Note:

- Traditionally, the magnetizing field, H, is measured in amperes per meter.
- Magnetic induction B (also known as magnetic flux density) has the SI unit tesla [T or Wb/m^{2}].
- One tesla is equal to 10^{4} gauss.
- Magnetic field drops off as the inverse cube of the distance (1/distance^{3}) from a dipole source.
- Energy required to produce laboratory magnetic fields increases with the square of magnetic field.

== Examples ==
These examples attempt to make the measuring point clear, usually the surface of the item mentioned.

Magnetic field strength (from lower to higher orders of magnitude)
Factor (tesla)	SI name	SI Value	CGS Value	Example of magnetic field strength
10^{−18} T	attotesla	1 aT	10 fG	
10^{−18} T	attotesla	5 aT	50 fG	Sensitivity of Gravity Probe B gyroscope's "SQUID" magnetometer (most sensitive when averaged over days)
10^{−17} T	attotesla	10 aT	100 fG	Sensitivity of Gravity Probe B gyroscope's "SQUID" magnetometer (most sensitive when averaged over days)
10^{−16} T	attotesla	100 aT	1 pG	Sensitivity of Gravity Probe B gyroscope's "SQUID" magnetometer (most sensitive when averaged over days)
10^{−15} T	femtotesla	1 fT	10 pG	Sensitivity of Gravity Probe B gyroscope's "SQUID" magnetometer (most sensitive when averaged over days)
10^{−15} T	femtotesla	2 fT	20 pG	Sensitivity of Gravity Probe B gyroscope's "SQUID" magnetometer (most sensitive when averaged over days)
10^{−14} T	femtotesla	10 fT	100 pG	
10^{−13} T	femtotesla	100 fT	1 nG	Human brain
10^{−12} T	picotesla	1 pT	10 nG	Human brain
10^{−11} T	picotesla	10 pT	100 nG	"Potholes" in the magnetic field found in the heliosheath around the Solar System reported by Voyager 1 (NASA, 2006)
10^{−10} T	picotesla	100 pT	1 μG	Heliosphere
10^{−9} T	nanotesla	1 nT	10 μG	Heliosphere
10^{−8} T	nanotesla	10 nT	100 μG	Heliosphere
10^{−7} T	nanotesla	100 nT	1 mG	Coffeemaker (30 cm or 1 ft away)
10^{−7} T	nanotesla	100 nT to 500 nT	1 mG to 5 mG	Residential electric distribution lines (34.5 kV) (15 m or 49 ft away)
10^{−6} T	microtesla	1 μT	10 mG	Blender (30 cm or 1 ft away)
10^{−6} T	microtesla	1.3 μT to 2.7 μT	13 mG to 27 mG	High power (500 kV) transmission lines (30 m or 100 ft away)
10^{−6} T	microtesla	6 μT	60 mG	Microwave oven (30 cm or 1 ft away)
10^{−5} T	microtesla	10 μT	100 mG	
10^{−5} T	microtesla	24 μT	240 mG	Magnetic tape near tape head
10^{−5} T	microtesla	31 μT	310 mG	Earth's magnetic field at 0° latitude (on the equator)
10^{−5} T	microtesla	58 μT	580 mG	Earth's magnetic field at 50° latitude
10^{−4} T	microtesla	100 μT	1 G	Magnetic flux density that will induce an electromotive force of 10^{−8} volts in each centimeter of a wire moving perpendicularly at 1 centimeter/second by definition (1 gauss = 1 maxwell/centimeter²)
10^{−4} T	microtesla	500 μT	5 G	Suggested exposure limit for cardiac pacemakers by American Conference of Governmental Industrial Hygienists (ACGIH)
10^{−3} T	millitesla	1 mT	10 G	Refrigerator magnets (10 G to 100 G)
10^{−2} T	centitesla	10 mT	100 G	Refrigerator magnets (10 G to 100 G)
10^{−2} T	centitesla	30 mT	300 G	Penny-sized ferrite magnet
10^{−1} T	decitesla	100 mT	1 kG	Penny-sized neodymium magnet
10^{−1} T	decitesla	150 mT	1.5 kG	Sunspot
10^{0} T	tesla	1 T	10 kG	Inside the core of a 60 Hz power transformer (1 T to 2 T as of 2001) or voice coil gap of a loudspeaker magnet (1 T to 2.4 T as of 2006)
10^{0} T	tesla	1.5 T to 7 T	15 kG to 70 kG	Medical magnetic resonance imaging systems (in practice)
10^{0} T	tesla	9.4 T	94 kG	Experimental magnetic resonance imaging systems: NMR spectrometer at 400 MHz (9.4 T) to 500 MHz (11.7 T)
10^{1} T	decatesla	10 T	100 kG	Experimental magnetic resonance imaging systems: NMR spectrometer at 400 MHz (9.4 T) to 500 MHz (11.7 T)
10^{1} T	decatesla	11.7 T	117 kG	Experimental magnetic resonance imaging systems: NMR spectrometer at 400 MHz (9.4 T) to 500 MHz (11.7 T)
10^{1} T	decatesla	16 T	160 kG	Levitate a frog by distorting its atomic orbitals
10^{1} T	decatesla	23.5 T	235 kG	1 GHz NMR spectrometer
10^{1} T	decatesla	32 T	320 kG	Strongest continuous magnet field produced by all-superconducting magnet
10^{1} T	decatesla	38 T	380 kG	Strongest continuous magnetic field produced by non-superconductive resistive magnet
10^{1} T	decatesla	45.22 T	452.2 kG	Strongest non-tiny continuous magnetic field produced in a laboratory (Steady High Magnetic Field Facility (SHMFF) in Hefei, China, 2022), beating previous 45 T record (National High Magnetic Field Laboratory's FSU, USA, 1999) (both are hybrid magnets, combining a superconducting magnet with a resistive magnet)
10^{1} T	decatesla	45.5 T	455 kG	Strongest continuous magnetic field produced in a laboratory (National High Magnetic Field Laboratory's FSU, USA, 2019), though the magnet is tiny (only 390 grams)
10^{2} T	hectotesla	100 T	1 MG	Strongest pulsed non-destructive ("multi-shot") magnetic field produced in a laboratory (Pulsed Field Facility at National High Magnetic Field Laboratory's Los Alamos National Laboratory, Los Alamos, New Mexico, USA)
10^{3} T	kilotesla	1 kT	10 MG	
10^{3} T	kilotesla	1.2 kT	12 MG	Record for indoor pulsed magnetic field, (University of Tokyo, Japan, 2018)
10^{3} T	kilotesla	2.8 kT	28 MG	Record for human produced, pulsed magnetic field (VNIIEF, Russia, 2001)
10^{4} T	kilotesla	10 kT	100 MG	
10^{4} T	kilotesla	35 kT	350 MG	Felt by valence electrons in a xenon atom due to the spin–orbit effect
10^{5} T	kilotesla	100 kT	1 GG	Non-magnetar neutron stars
10^{6} T	megatesla	1 MT	10 GG	Non-magnetar neutron stars
10^{7} T	megatesla	10 MT	100 GG	Non-magnetar neutron stars
10^{8} T	megatesla	100 MT	1 TG	Non-magnetar neutron stars
10^{9} T	gigatesla	1 GT	10 TG	Schwinger limit (c. 4.41 GT) above which the electromagnetic field becomes nonlinear
10^{9} T	gigatesla	1.6 GT	16 TG	Swift J0243.6+6124, most magnetic pulsar known
10^{10} T	gigatesla	10 GT	100 TG	Magnetar neutron stars
10^{11} T	gigatesla	100 GT	1 PG	Magnetar neutron stars
10^{12} T	teratesla	1 TT	10 PG	
10^{13} T	teratesla	10 TT	100 PG	
10^{14} T	teratesla	100 TT	1 EG	Magnetic fields inside heavy ion collisions at RHIC

== See also ==
- Orders of magnitude (magnetic moment)
