= German Center for Neurodegenerative Diseases =

Research institute

German Center for Neurodegenerative Diseases DZNE
- Deutsche Zentrum für Neurodegenerative Erkrankungen

Agency overview
- Formed: April 2009
- Type: Research Center
- Headquarters: Venusberg-Campus 1/99 53127 Bonn, Germany
- Employees: 1000
- Agency executives: Prof. Dr. Joachim Schultze, Scientific Director and Chairman of the Executive Board (interim); Susanne Wolf, Administrative Director (interim)
- Website: www.dzne.de

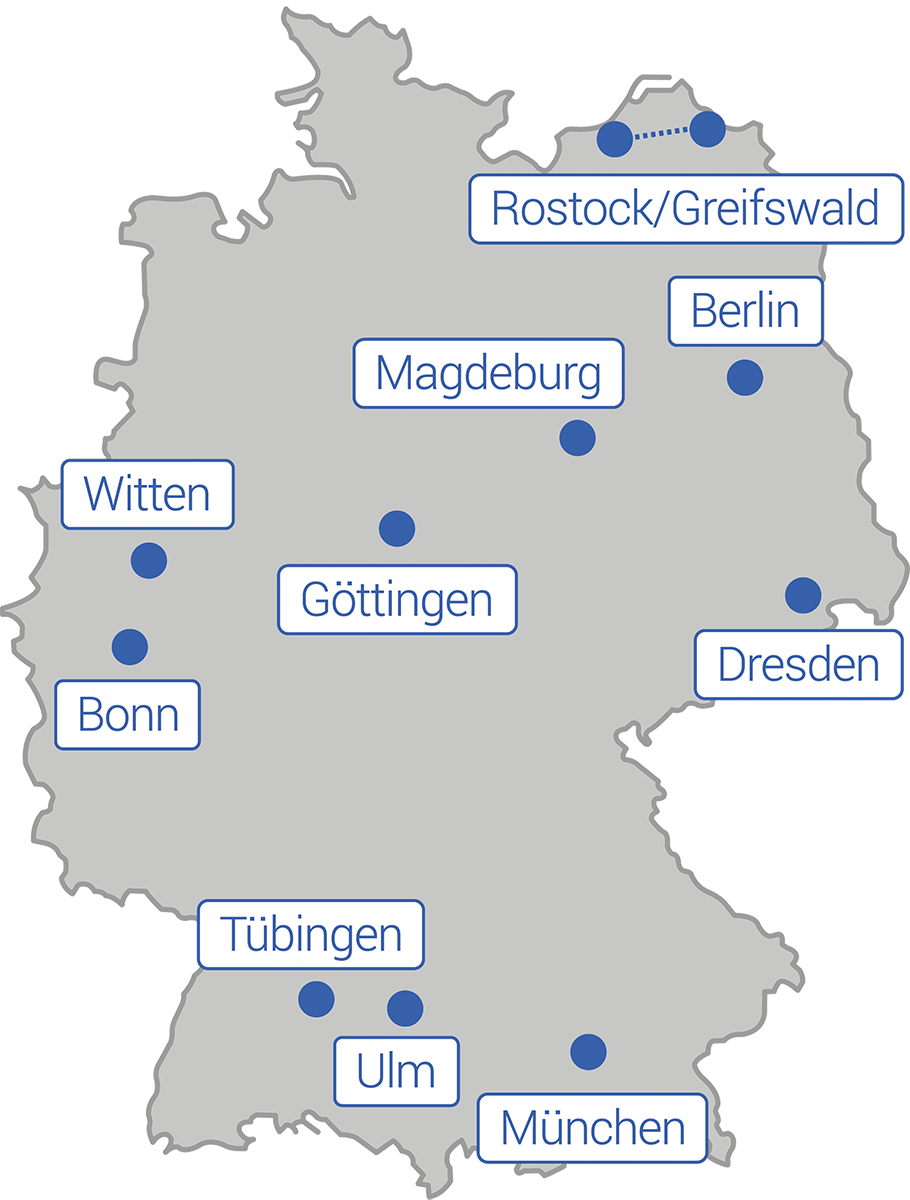
Overview map of all 10 DZNE locations

The German Center for Neurodegenerative Diseases (German: Deutsches Zentrum für Neurodegenerative Erkrankungen, (DZNE)) is an interdisciplinary research institution that investigates neurodegenerative disease in all its facets. It is one of six "centers for health research" founded by the German Ministry of Research, Technology and Space (BMFTR) to combat the most important and widespread diseases. The DZNE is part of the Helmholtz Association of German Research Centres.

== Organisation and history ==
The center's declared aim is to develop new preventive and therapeutic approaches for neurodegenerative diseases. To accomplish this the DZNE follows a translational approach. This means that fundamental research is closely related to clinical research, population studies, and health care research. At each site, the DZNE works closely with universities, university hospitals, and other partners. The DZNE receives 90 percent of its funding from the Federal Ministry of Research, Technology and Space and 10 percent from the respective federal states containing DZNE sites.

== Locations ==
In total there are 10 sites all over Germany: Berlin, Bonn, Dresden, Göttingen, Magdeburg, Munich, Rostock / Greifswald, Tübingen, Ulm and Witten.
