= Helmholtz-Zentrum Dresden-Rossendorf =

Research laboratory in Germany

Coordinates: 51°03′49″N 13°56′59″E

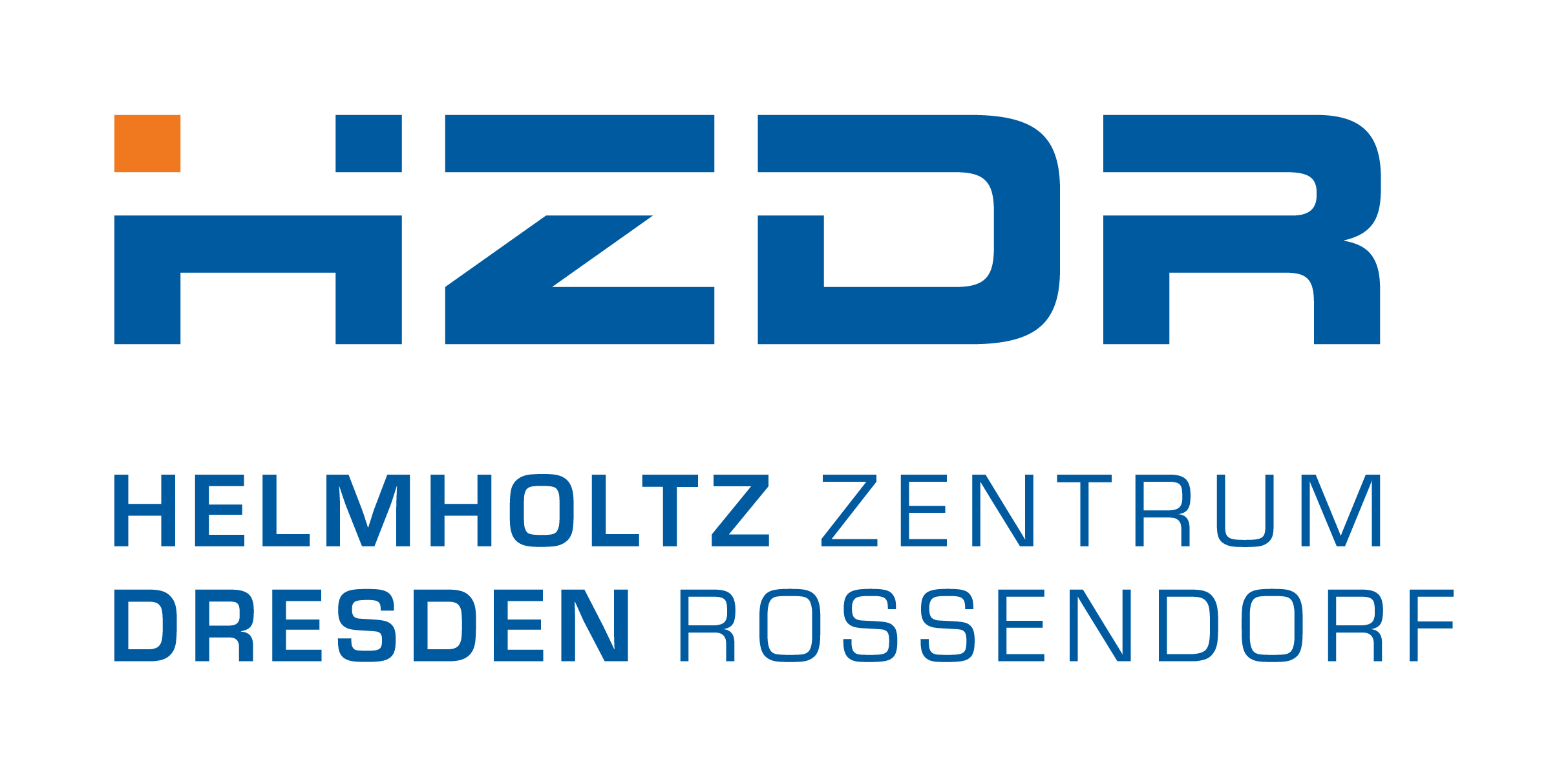
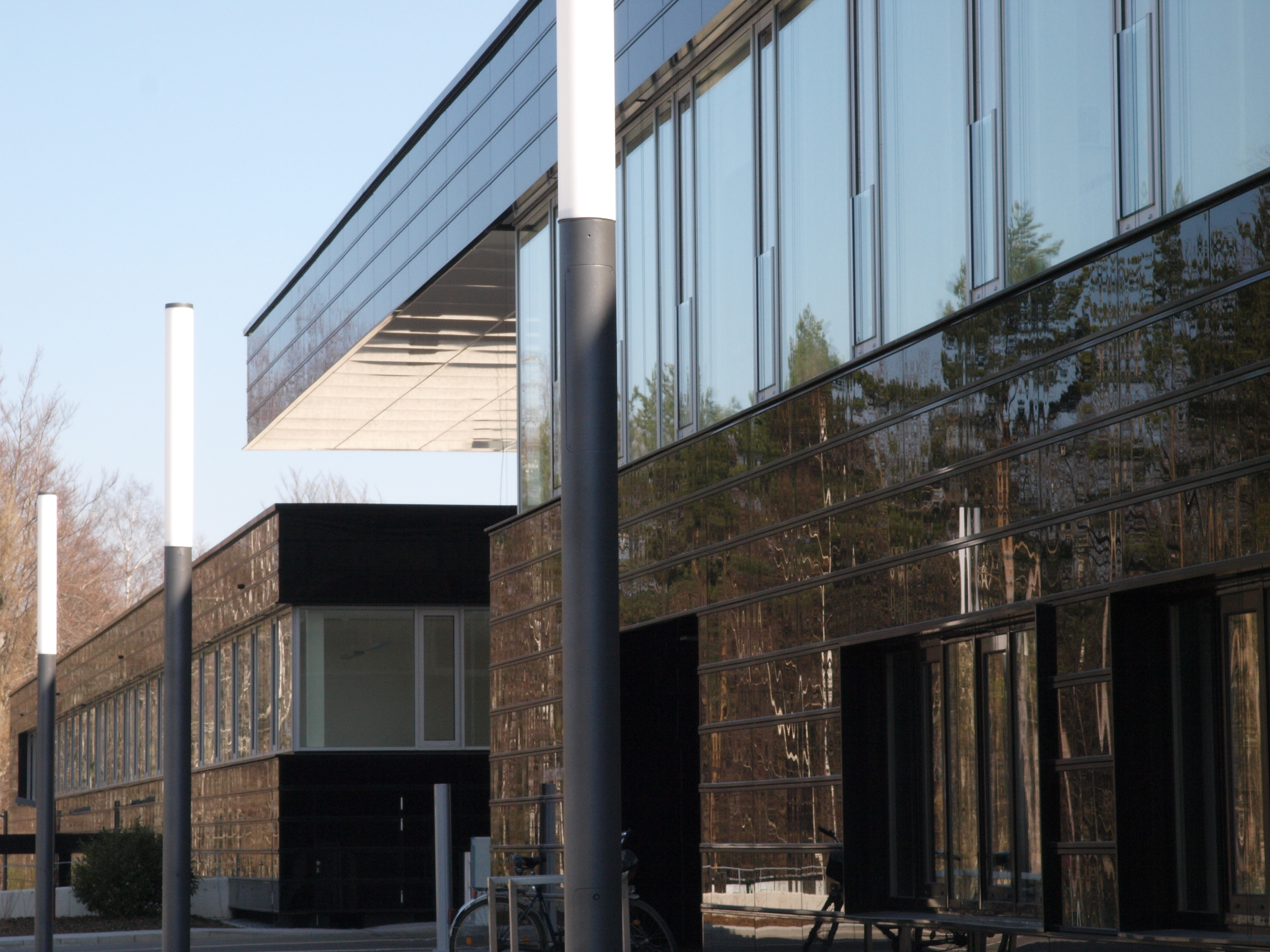
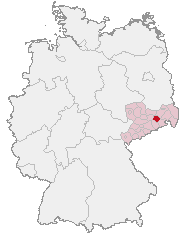
Entrance of the HZDR
Established:	1992
Scientific director:	Sebastian M. Schmidt
Administrative director:	Diana Stiller
Staff:	1.400 (2020)
Budget:	ca. 136 Mio. Euro (2020)
Location:	Dresden, Germany
Official website:	www.hzdr.de

The Helmholtz-Zentrum Dresden-Rossendorf (HZDR) is a Dresden-based research laboratory. It conducts research in three of the Helmholtz Association's areas: materials, health, and energy. HZDR is a member of the Helmholtz Association of German Research Centres.

== History ==
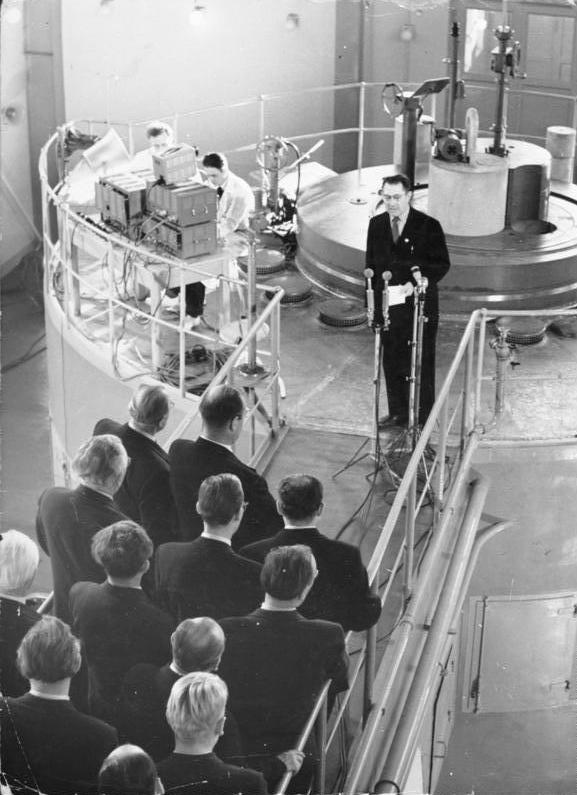
SED Central Committee member Fritz Selbmann delivers an address at the ceremony for the launch of the Rossendorf Research Reactor, East Germany's first nuclear reactor, 16 December 1957

HZDR is located at the site of the former Central Institute for Nuclear Physics (later: Central Institute for Nuclear Research) in Dresden-Rossendorf, which was founded in 1956 and became the largest nuclear research institute in the GDR. The former research center in Rossendorf was part of the German Academy of Sciences. The German-born British physicist Klaus Fuchs, who took part in the Manhattan Project and acted as a spy for the Soviet Union, was deputy director until 1974.

In 1992, Forschungszentrum Rossendorf was founded at the research site. In 2006 the name changed to "Forschungszentrum Dresden-Rossendorf", to emphasize the connection to the research infrastructure in the city of Dresden. In 2011 the center became a member of the Helmholtz Association of German Research Centres.

== Research programs ==
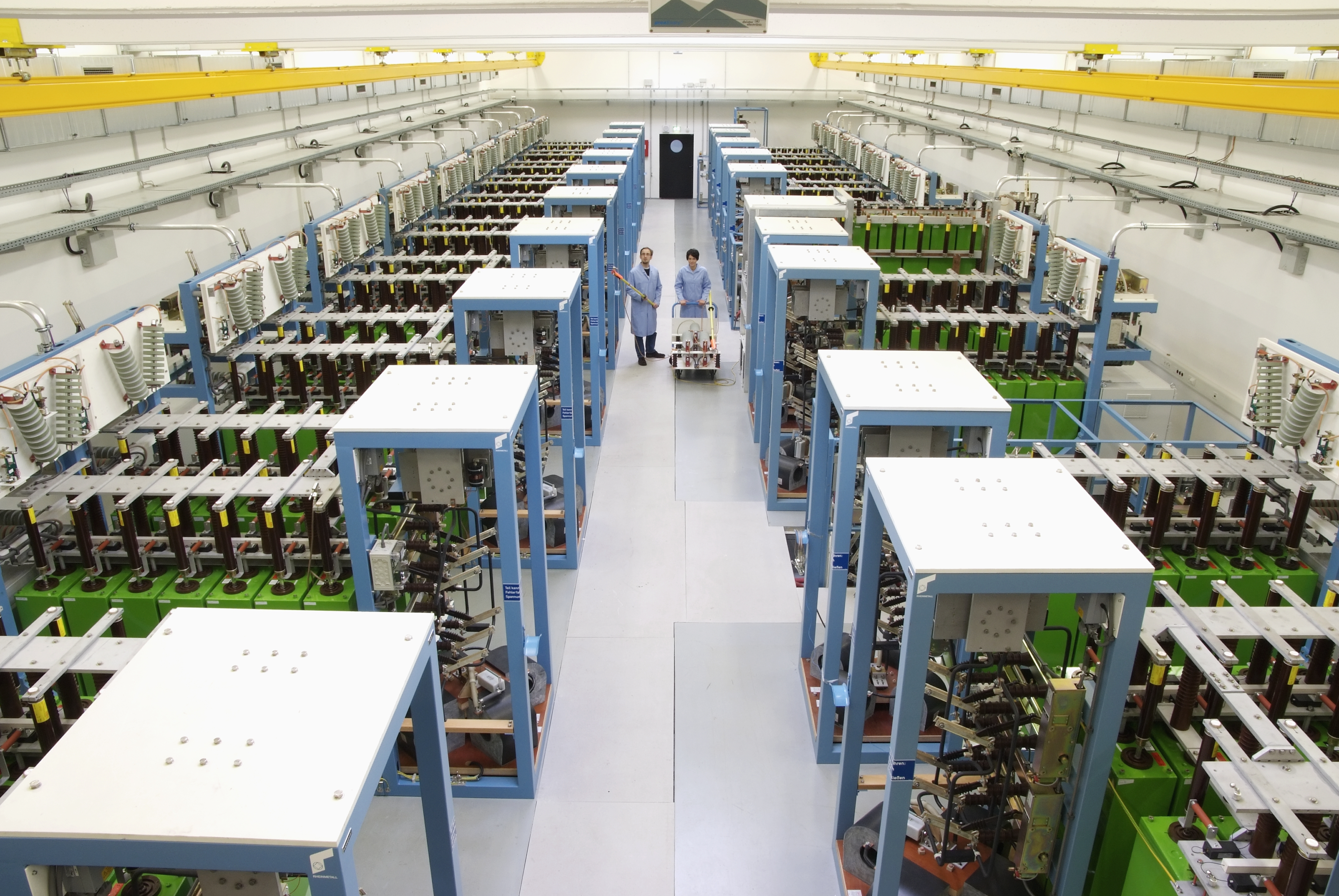
Dresden High Magnetic Field Laboratory: capacitor bank of the pulsed current source

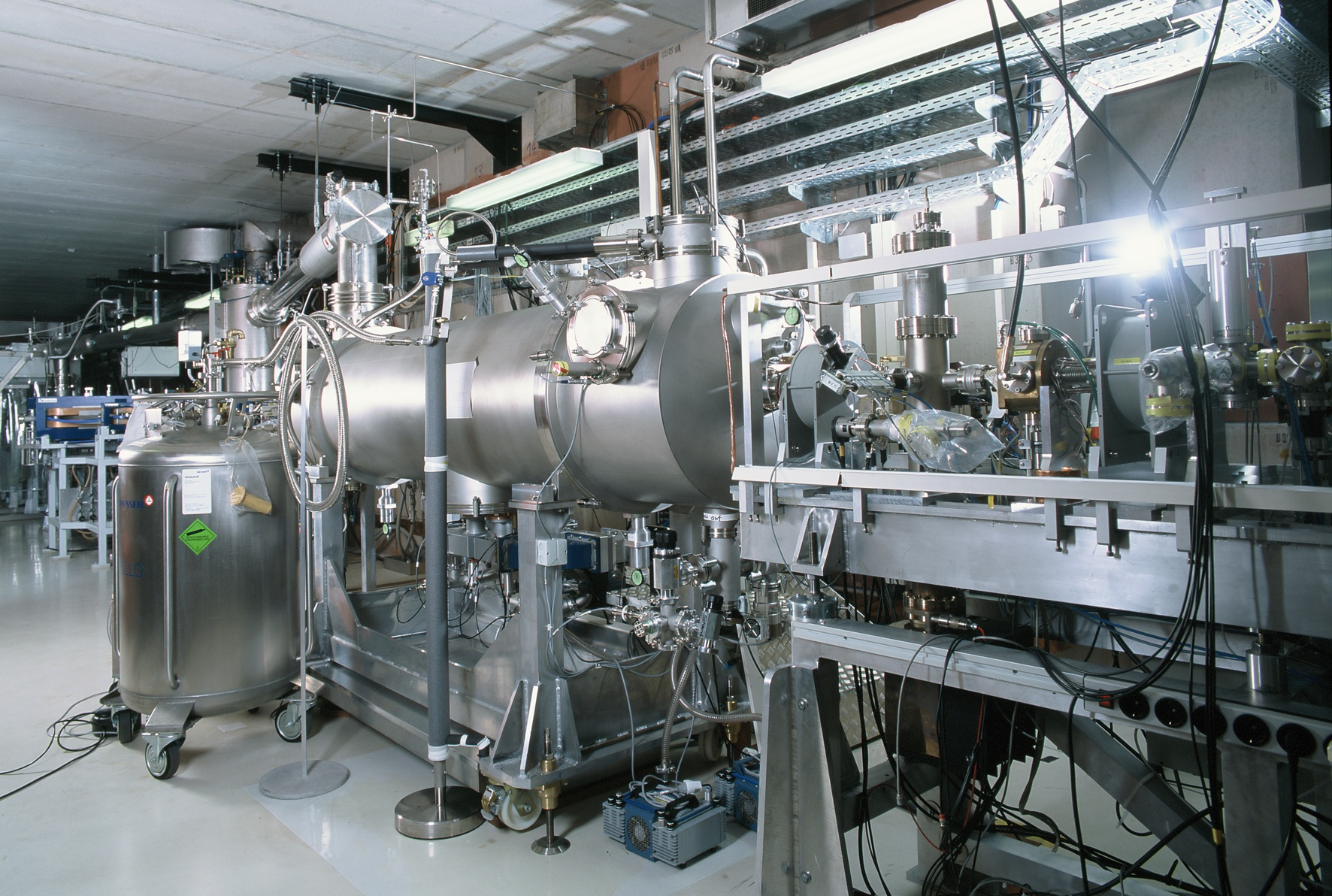
Radiation source ELBE (Electron Linac for beams with high Brilliance and low Emittance)

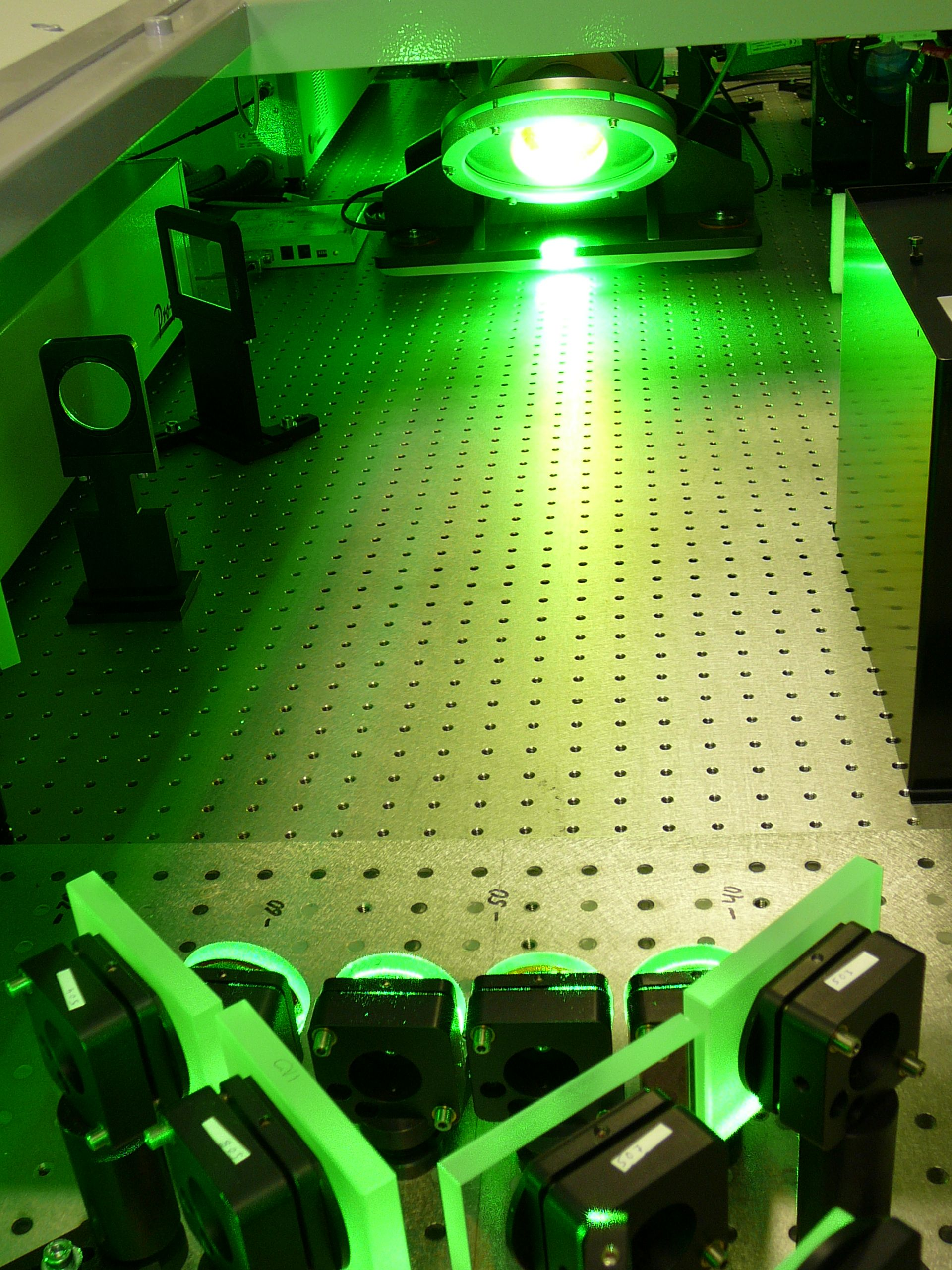
Dresden laser acceleration source DRACO

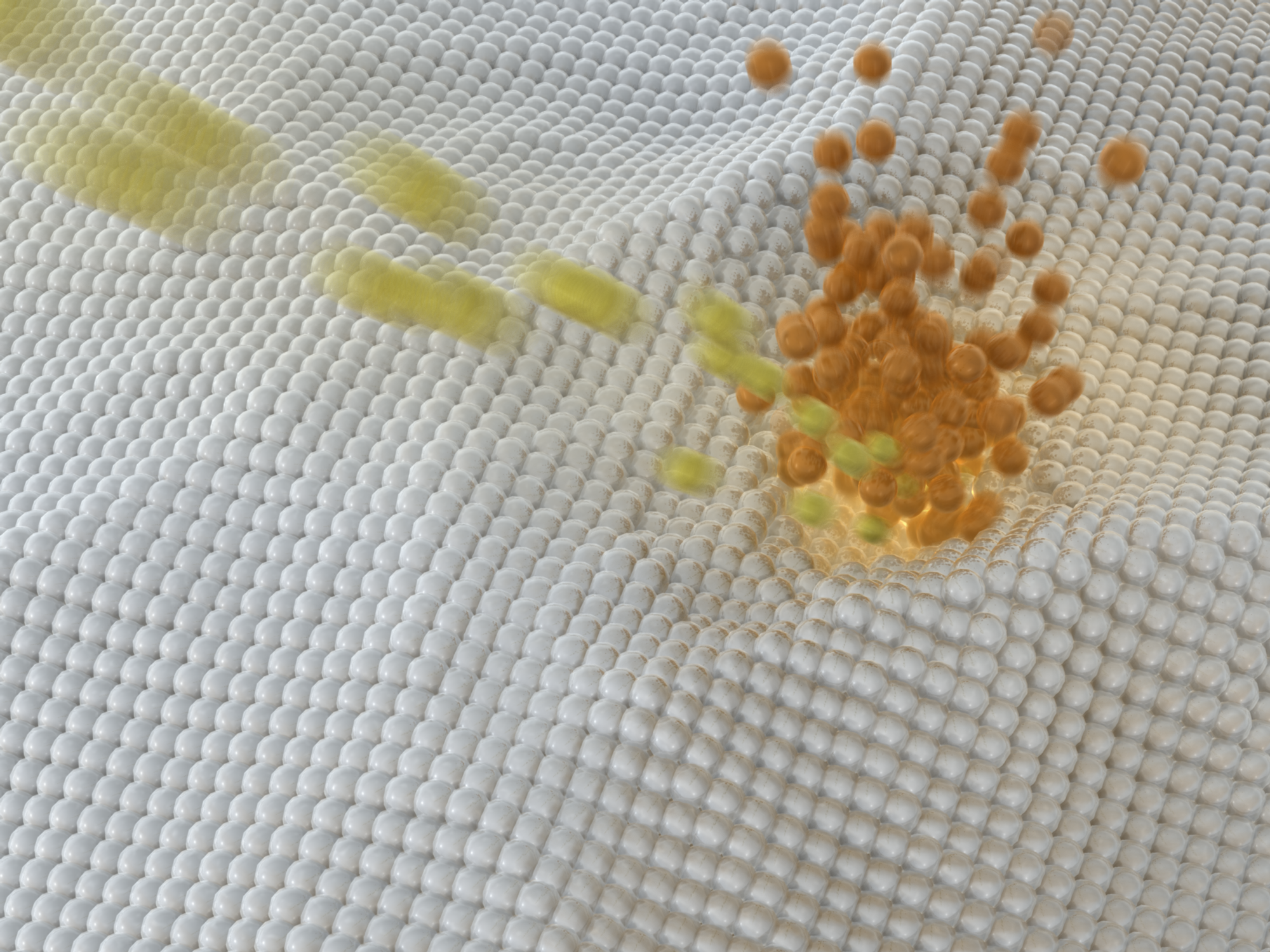
Simulation of an ion beam hitting the surface of a material

HZDR conducts research in the materials, health and energy sectors in Dresden and at four other locations in Germany and one in France. In Grenoble, it operates a beamline for radiochemistry research at the European Synchrotron Radiation Facility (ESRF). Three of HZDR's five large-scale facilities are available to international scientists.

Materials

HZDR scientists are investigating the structure and function of new materials in order to better understand, optimize, and use them for specific applications. This includes research on novel superconducting and semiconducting materials using high magnetic fields or ion beams. They are developing detectors for applications in medicine and technology, and are advancing technologies for particle acceleration.

Health

HZDR aims at making progress in early diagnosis and therapy of cancer. It collaborates with partners from university medicine (National Center for Radiation Research in Oncology, OncoRay, in Dresden). HZDR cancer research concentrates on three major fields: new radioactive pharmaceuticals for cancer diagnosis and therapy, innovative medical imaging methods used in oncology as well as particle acceleration using new laser technologies for radiation oncology.

Energy

HZDR researchers are looking for economically and ecologically feasible energy solutions. The Helmholtz Institute Freiberg for Resource Technology, a joint initiative of HZDR and TU Bergakademie Freiberg, is targeting new technologies for the exploration, mining, and use of strategically important metals and minerals, e.g. biotechnological methods for metal recycling. Scientists also study energy-intensive processes in industry, like steel casting or in the chemical industry. They are examining nuclear repositories and reactors. And they are contributing to new storage technologies, e.g., developing a liquid metal battery.

== Research facilities ==
HZDR operates multiple research facilities:

- ELBE is a Center for High-Power Radiation Sources and HZDR's largest research facility. It encompasses a superconducting Electron Linear accelerator for beams with high Brilliance and low Emittance (ELBE) and two FEL for the mid and far infrared spectra. In addition, the electron beam delivers multiple other secondary beams (quasi-monochromatic X-rays, polarized Bremsstrahlung, pulsed neutron beams and pulsed mono-energetic positrons).
- The high-power laser Dresden Laser Acceleration Source (DRACO), a titanium:sapphire laser, achieves a power of 1 PW by means of chirped pulse amplification and is used to accelerate protons and electrons to high energies using laser plasma acceleration. DRACO is part of HZDR's ELBE Center for High-Power Radiation Sources.
- With PEnELOPE, another laser system with petawatt energies is under construction. It is a short-pulse laser source in the petawatt range pumped by diode lasers. In particular, it is intended to enable the laser-assisted acceleration of protons for medical applications. The ultimate goal is to replace the large particle accelerators required today for proton beam cancer therapy with much more compact facilities.
- The Dresden High Magnetic Field Laboratory (Hochfeld-Magnetlabor Dresden, HLD) is located directly next to ELBE in order to be able to perform combined experiments. Here, particularly strong pulsed magnetic fields are generated. Magnetic fields of up to 100 tesla are available here for materials research. The coils, which were also developed at the site, can generate fields of 95 tesla for fractions of a second (as of May 2017). The coils are cooled to around -200 °C with liquid nitrogen and a current of several tens of thousands of amperes flows through them for a short time. A capacitor bank is used for this purpose (Fig.). At HLD, the fundamental, quantum mechanical properties of magnetism are also investigated and new components such as high-temperature superconductors are developed. HLD is a user facility and partnering in the EU project European Magnetic Field Laboratory (EMFL), a consortium dedicated to unite and coordinate the existing European high magnetic field laboratories.
- The Helmholtz International Beamline for Extreme Fields (HIBEF) was set up by the HZDR together with the Deutsches Elektronen-Synchrotron (DESY) at the X-ray laser European XFEL in Hamburg. HIBEF combines the X-ray radiation of the European XFEL with two superlasers, a powerful magnetic coil and a platform for research with diamond stamp cells. In this way, the behavior of matter under the influence of exceptionally high pressures, temperatures and magnetic fields can be studied with unprecedented precision.
- The Ion Beam Center (IBC) offers the possibility of selectively bombarding samples with charged atoms of various light and heavy chemical elements coming from different sources. These plasma and ion sources generate ions of all species at energies between 10 eV and 50 MeV. Several machines can accelerate the projectiles to different energies, which allows their effect on the sample to be controlled. Depending on the element and energy, these ion beams are suitable for investigating or selectively modifying samples. These machines are used primarily for the development of tiny electronic components, layered semiconductor systems such as in solar cells, or optical materials such as the transparent but conductive surfaces of modern screens. IBC is funded as a user facility by the EU.
- ROBL, the Rossendorf Beamline at the ESRF in Grenoble/ France, comprises two facilities for radiochemical experiments.
- The PET Center is operated together with Technische Universität Dresden and University Hospital Dresden. Researchers are developing imaging methods for cancer diagnosis as well as new approaches to cancer treatment. Together, these institutions also operate the National Center for Radiation Research in Oncology – OncoRay.
- The thermohydraulic test facility TOPFLOW investigates stationary and transient phenomena in two-phase flows and develops models derived from Computational Fluid Dynamic (CFD) Codes.
- The DREsden Sodium facility for DYNamo and thermohydraulic studies (DRESDYN) is intended as a platform both for large scale experiments related to geo- and astrophysics as well as for experiments related to thermohydraulic and safety aspects of liquid metal batteries and liquid metal fast reactors. Its most ambitious projects are a homogeneous hydromagnetic dynamo driven solely by precession and a large Taylor-Couette type experiment for the combined investigation of the magnetorotational instability and the Tayler instability.

== Departments ==
The HZDR comprises eight institutes:

- Institute of Ion Beam Physics and Materials Research
- Institute Dresden High Magnetic Field Laboratory
- Institute of Fluid Dynamics
- Institute of Radiation Physics
- Institute of Radiopharmaceutical Cancer Research
- Institute of Radiooncology – OncoRay
- Institute of Resource Ecology
- Helmholtz Institute Freiberg for Resource Technology, together with the TU Bergakademie Freiberg.

In addition, there are research departments that cover specific research foci as independent units: CASUS (Center for Advanced Systems Understanding) as an institute in formation and the Department of Theoretical Physics.

Scientific-technical support is provided to all institutes and research departments by two central departments:

- Central Department Research Technology, for the development and setup of research facilities and experiments.
- Central Department Information Services and Computing, for the informatics infrastructure of all HZDR sites.

== Collaborations ==
The HZDR is nationally and internationally connected to other institutions and organised in various research alliances.

International collaborations

- European Synchrotron Radiation Facility (ESFR)
- European XFEL
- WHELMI Lab (Weizmann-Helmholtz Laboratory for Laser Matter Interaction)
- LEAPS Initiative (League of European Accelerator-based Photon Sources)
- ERF AISBL (Association of European-level Research Infrastructure Facilities)
- ELI (Extreme Light Infrastructure)
- European Magnetic Field Laboratory (EMFL)
- EIT RawMaterials
- INFACT (Innovative, Non-Invasive and Fully Acceptable Exploration Technologies)
- Universität Breslau
- ARIEL (Accelerator and Research reactor Infrastructures for Education and Learning)
- Monash University Melbourne
- Lightsources.org, a platform of the world-wide light source community
- RADIATE (Research And Development with Ion Beams – Advancing Technology in Europe)
- FineFuture (Resource optimization as a common challenge)
- Helmholtz-SESAME Beamline (HESEB)

National collaborations

- DRESDEN-concept (Dresden Research and Education Synergies for the Development of Excellence and Novelty)
- TU Dresden
- TU Bergakademie Freiberg
- TU Chemnitz
- German Working Group for Repository Research / Deutsche Arbeitsgemeinschaft Endlagerforschung
- Competence Pool for Radiation Research / Kompetenzverbund Strahlenforschung
- Competence Pool East for Nuclear Technology / Kompetenzverbund Ost für Kerntechnik
- Universitätsklinikum Carl Gustav Carus Dresden
- OncoRay – Zentrum für Strahlenforschung in der Onkologie
- NCT/UCC – National Center for Tumor Diseases
- DKTK – German Cancer Consortium
- ROTOP Pharmaka GmbH
- Universität Rostock

== Staff and research sites ==
The HZDR employs about 1,400 staff, working at six research sites. The headquarters is in Dresden, a research center for radiopharmaceutical and georadiochemical research is in the Leipzig Science Park.

== Technology transfer ==
The HZDR Innovation GmbH corporation offers industrial services using HZDR's know-how and infrastructures in ion implantation. This technology is applied for doping material surfaces with foreign atoms or to produce defects in semiconductors. It is also used to create materials with targeted features such as oxidation resistance, which is important for aviation or automotive lightweight construction, or biocompatibility for medical implants. Products of HZDR Innovation that have already been commercialized include a grid sensor and measuring instruments for analyzing multiphase flows.

== Students and young scientists ==
Roughly 170 doctoral students work there. The HZDR installed junior research groups to promote excellent young scientists, the topics of which as of 2021 are:

- Physical chemistry of biomolecular condensates
- Bubbles go with the turbulent flows
- Terahertz-driven dynamics at surfaces and interfaces
- Artificial Intelligence for the future photon science
- Advanced modelling of multiphase flows
- Nano Safety
- BioKollekt
- Application-oriented laser particle acceleration

Another junior research group receives special funding from the Helmholtz Association:

- Ultrafast X-ray Methods for Laboratory Astrophysics

In addition, there is a DFG-funded junior research group in the Emmy Noether Program:

- Towards Fluid Dynamics of Foam and Froth

Another group receives funding from the European Research Council (ERC):

- TOP: Towards the Bottom of the Periodic Table

HZDR operates an International Helmholtz Research School for Nanoelectronic Networks (NANONET) as well as a Summer Student Program.
