= Rock music in Italy =

Italian rock is a form of rock music produced primarily in Italy. The music genre has roots in the country as it spread in the early 1960s from the United States with the earliest versions of rock and roll during this period being cover versions or interpretative covers of already existing songs.

== History ==
=== 1960s and 1970s ===
The first distinctively Italian singer-songwriter was Piero Ciampi, whose style was reminiscent of the French chansonniers. The United States and United Kingdom during the 1960s were in the midst of the psychedelic rock boom, which inspired Italian psychedelic bands such as Mario Schifano and Le Orme. At the time of the 1968 student uprisings, many young and educated Italians began to identify with the counterculture in France, Mexico, the US and across the world. Young Italians still had a well-educated familiarity with classical music composers like Bach. The result was an influx of classically influenced rock bands which fit right into the international move towards progressive rock. Italian progressive bands include:

- Banco del Mutuo Soccorso
- Celeste
- Devil Doll
- Goblin
- Jacula
- Latte e Miele
- New Trolls
- Premiata Forneria Marconi (PFM)
- Reale Accademia di Musica
- Saint Just
- Le Orme

Some bands, like Osanna, Area, Perigeo and Arti & Mestieri (Arti e Mestieri), fused progressive rock with jazz, fusion and world music. Il Balletto Di Bronzo's YS is one of the most debated Italian prog-rock albums; Some calling it trash and others extolling it as one of the greatest progressive albums ever made. Another important album of the time was Arbeit macht frei by Area. They merged agit-prop lyrics, jazz-rock jamming, raw electronics, middle-eastern scales and psychotic warbling, creating an original mixture of different music styles. Area were fronted by Demetrio Stratos, one of the most original singers of his age, who recorded experimental albums entirely devoted to the human voice such as Cantare la Voce. The same period, the early 1970s, also saw the rise of Italian singers and songwriters like Lucio Battisti, Fabrizio De André, Franco Battiato, Paolo Conte and Francesco Guccini.

By the end of the 1970s, Italian punk and comedy rock pioneers Skiantos had released 1978's Monotono, which kickstarted the Italian punk scene. Later bands like The Confusional Quartet and Gaznevada fused new wave and Italian varieta with punk and other influences.

=== 1980s ===
In the 1980s, Italy boasted one of the most vibrant new wave, hardcore and thrash metal scenes. In the late 1980s, more extreme heavy metal bands appeared. Of these bands include:

- Afterhours
- Ataraxia
- CCCP Fedeli alla linea
- Diaframma
- Kirlian Camera
- Litfiba
- Monumentum
- Necrodeath
- Negazione
- Opera IX
- Raw Power
- Vanadium
- Vasco Rossi
- White Skull

=== 1990s and beyond ===
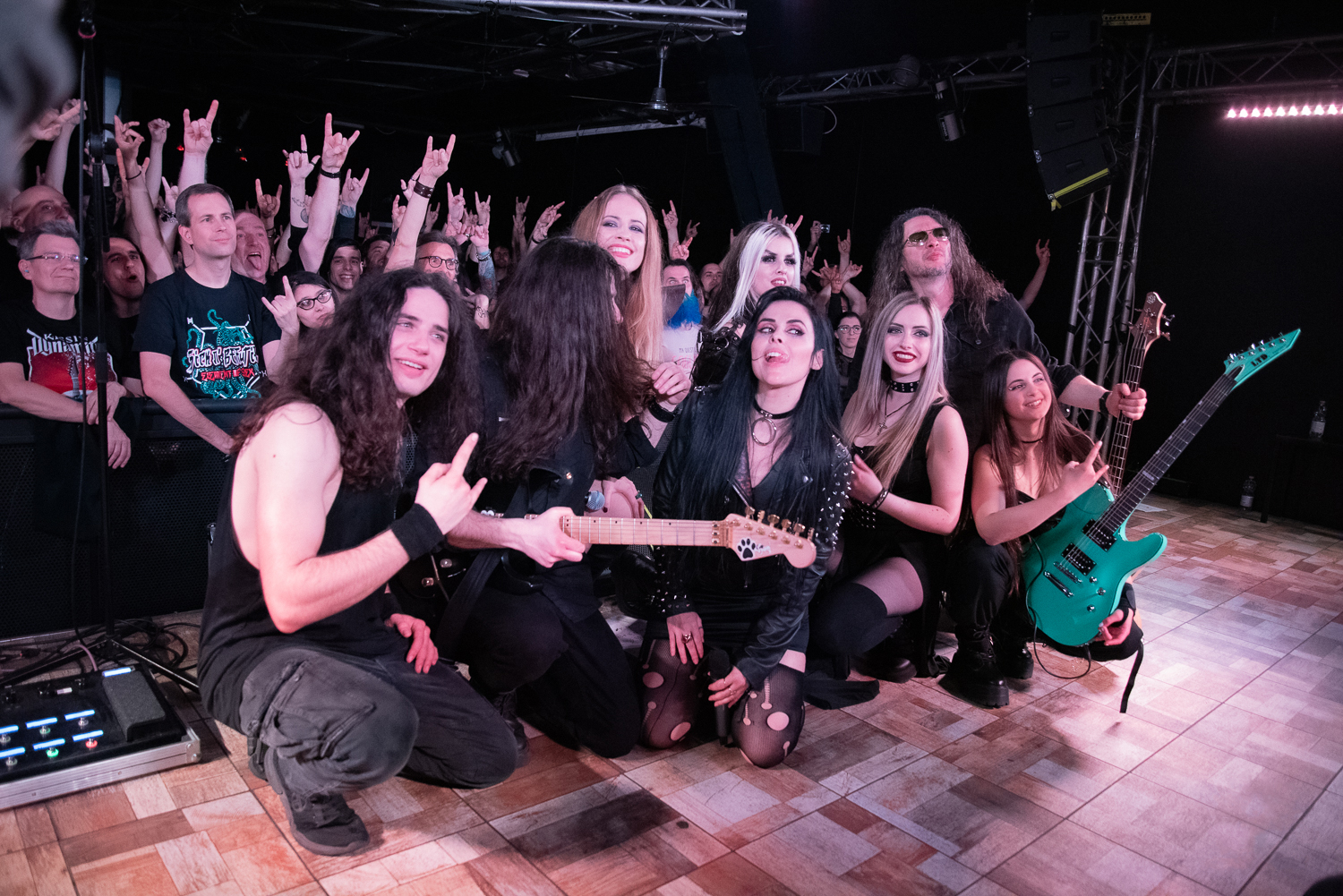
Members of Frozen Crown, Nocturna, and Volturian after a shared concert.

In the 1990s, Italian avant-garde, alternative rock and metal bands gained international notoriety, at least among critics. In general, the sonic model was a mixture of Big Black, Sonic Youth and Fugazi, while the themes coined a sort of neo-existentialism, very much concerned with the psychodramas of ordinary kids. Italy, the homeland of melodic music, turned out to be one of the major international centers for post-rock. Gianna Nannini in the 1970s, 1980s and into the 1990s was the first Italian rocker who achieve real popular success outside of Italy, especially in Germany, Austria, Switzerland, Benelux and later in Mexico. While Francesco De Gregori was well appreciated by critics and well-informed fans outside of Italy it was Nannini who was first Italian pop icon to stick and to shift between pop and rock with ease and to stay the course through trends and upcoming generations. Zucchero, Eros Ramazzotti and Jovanotti (later: Nek and Laura Pausini) all went on to become huge international pop names in the late 1980s and 1990s.

Other artists to emerge in the 1990s and beyond include:

- Aborym
- Afterhours
- Almamegretta
- Ancient Bards
- Baryonyx
- Belladonna
- Bluvertigo
- Cadaveria
- Carmen Consoli
- Catarrhal Noise
- C.S.I.
- Dark Lunacy
- Disarmonia Mundi
- Disciplinatha
- The Dogma
- Domine
- Doomsword
- Dope Stars Inc.
- Elio e le Storie Tese
- Elisa
- Finley
- Fleshgod Apocalypse
- Forgotten Tomb
- Frozen Crown
- Gabin
- Gianluca Grignani
- Graveworm
- Infinita Symphonia
- Jasta Eleven
- Kirlian Camera
- Labyrinth
- Lacuna Coil
- Le Vibrazioni
- Linea 77
- Luciano Ligabue
- Mandragora Scream
- Måneskin
- Marlene Kuntz
- Massimo Volume
- Mastercastle
- Mau Mau
- Meganoidi
- Negramaro
- Negrita
- Nocturna
- Novembre
- Onyria
- Opera IX
- Pier Gonella
- Planet Funk
- Punkreas
- Rhapsody of Fire
- Ritmo Tribale
- Starfuckers
- Subsonica
- Il Teatro degli Orrori
- Temperance
- Theatres des Vampires
- Tiromancino
- Tre Allegri Ragazzi Morti
- Uzeda
- Vanilla Sky
- Verdena
- Vision Divine
- Volturian
- Zen Circus
- Zu

== See also ==
- Italian progressive rock
