= Turboamerica =

Studio album by Catarrhal Noise
- Released: 2002
- Recorded: 2002
- Genre: Heavy metal Hard rock Crossover; Comedy rock
- Producer: Catarrhal Noise; Herman Medrano

Catarrhal Noise chronology
Basame el cueo (2001)	Turboamerica (2002)	Te spùo so 'na recia (2004)

Turboamerica is the fourth album of Italian band Catarrhal Noise.

== Track listing ==
1. "Turboamerica" – 2:02
2. "Rubrica de l'agricoltore agricolo" – 5:07
3. "Me so' caga' dosso" – 2:40
4. "Silvanos Prestige" – 2:48
5. "Maedetta chea volta" – 2:53
6. "Duilio Sio Gan" – 2:37
7. "Fasso macello" – 3:34
8. "DJ Beggiato e Renato" – 0:31
9. "I boari xe rivai" – 2:53
10. "Mansueta" – 1:02
11. "A grilliata" – 1:54
12. "Figaro Automotors" – 0:54
13. "Gianni furgone mojto" – 2:36
14. "Giffo Hot Line" – 1:25
15. "Bordeo" – 3:17
16. "DJ Renato e Beggiato" – 0:28
17. "Bele ghiape" – 1:52
18. "Le bele giornate" – 3:11
19. "Sette Racing" – 2:36
20. "El toro" – 1:24
21. "Renato e Beggiato DJ" – 0:26
22. "Bauco" – 3:58
23. "A fagiolata" – 2:49
24. "I Proverbi de Silvano" – 1:37
