= Paolo Cellammare =

Italian artist, photographer and director

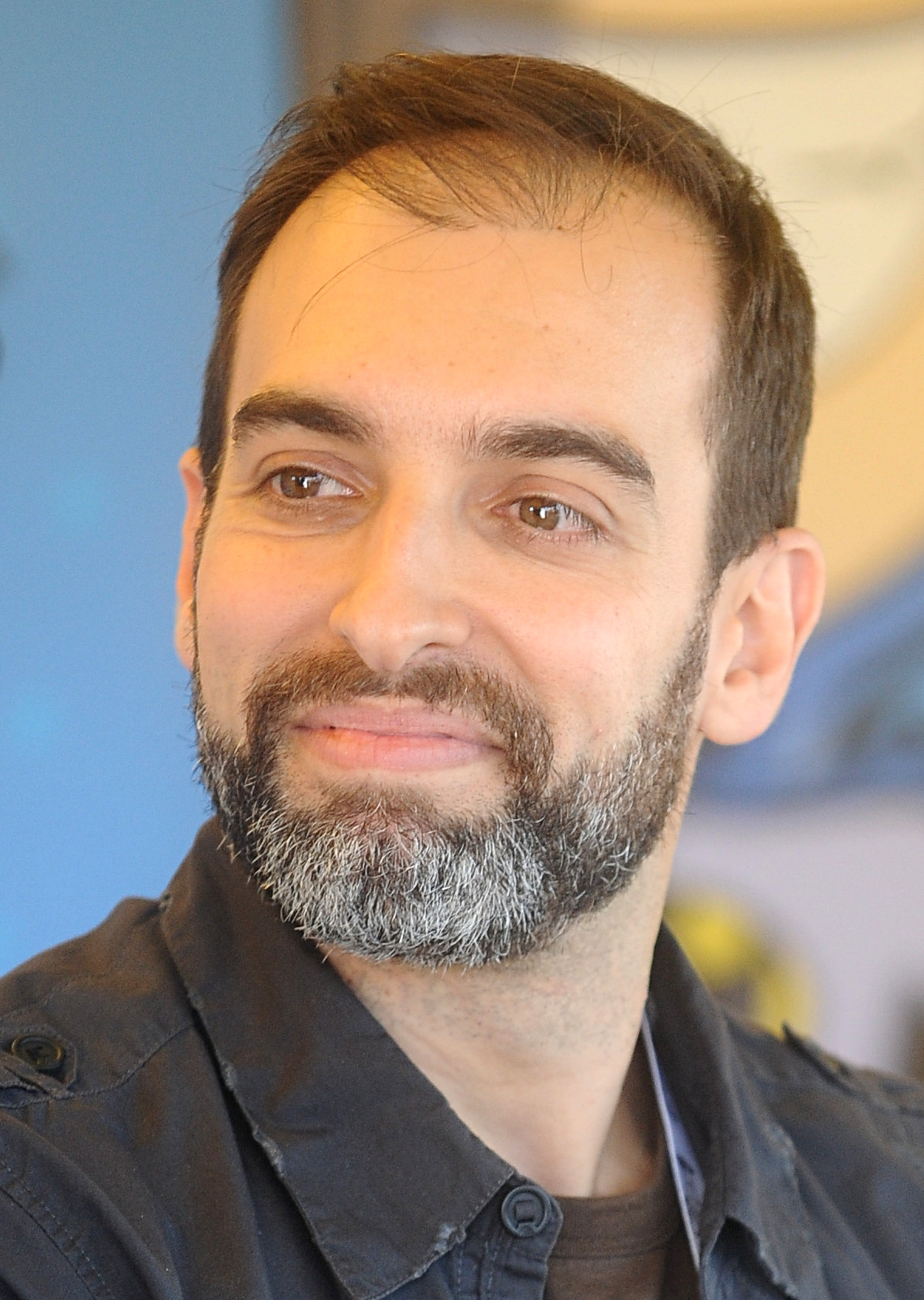
Cellammare in 2016

Paolo Cellammare (born 21 October 1980) is an Italian artist, film producer, photographer and director, known around the world mostly because of his cosplay photography, in particular for his work with Francesca Dani.

== Biography ==
Cellammare was born in Ischia. In 2004 he made his first short movie Ultimo spettacolo (Last Picture Show) and his first documentary L'ultimo giorno del vittoria.

In 2005 he terminated his studies getting a degree as multimedia project manager at the Università di Ferrara and started working in post-production for advertising and television getting the chance to learn advanced editing, compositing and CGI.

In 2006 he worked as researcher, supervising the audio-visual department at the Communication Strategies Laboratory of the Università di Firenze, creating new video communication concepts.

From 2007 to 2017 he worked for RAI, Italian national broadcasting network as editor and visual mixer.

From 2002 to 2009 he was exclusive photographer of cosplayer and net-idol Francesca Dani. His style was influenced by Japanese pop culture with a gothic and cyberpunk mood.

He traveled extensively to work with Dani, going to conventions and events, mostly in Latin America, as special guest or cosplay contest judge. In a few years he became a recognized and respected cosplay photographer.

In 2010 he produced and directed with journalists Jacopo Cecconi and Giammarco Sicuro the independent feature documentary Wishes on a falling star, relating real-life stories in Cuba and featuring a long interview with the blogger Yoani Sanchez.

The movie was totally self-funded and shot without permission of the Cuban government. It was broadcast in Italy in May 2010 by channel RaiTre during the show Agenda del Mondo getting a 12% ratings, with a peak of 15%. During production Cellammare was arrested in Santa Clara (Cuba) while taking photos of a violent police action.

In September 2010 he showcased his first photo exhibition titled Cosplay at the Palazzo Medici Riccardi in Florence (Italy). During 2012 the exhibition got enlarged during two more events in Milan (Italy) and Udine (Italy) for the Far East Film Festival 2012.

In 2012 he wrote and directed his first music videoclip, Standin' Tall for the young Italian rock band Voodoo.

After his collaboration in the United States with YouTube stars such as Freddie Wong and Corridor Digital, he decided to start a YouTube channel, Cotto & Frullato. The show is written and directed by him and produced with the show presenter and popular Italian voice actor Maurizio Merluzzo.

In 2016, following the national success of the 2 seasons of Cotto & Frullato he launched a crowdfunding campaign to finance a film that would end the web series. The campaign succeeded raising €41,712 over a request of €39,000, a national record for film production fund raising in Italy at the time.

In 2017 the movie Cotto & Frullato Z The Crystal Gear, written, produced and directed by Paolo Cellammare, had a limited, special event, release in 13 theatres in Italy.

In 2019 he directed 3 music videos for comedy heavy metal band Nanowar of Steel. The first is And then I noticed that she was a Gargoyle released on May the 20th 2019. The second is Norwegian Reggaeton, released on July the 2nd 2019, featuring Charly Glamour from Spanish band Gigatron. After the breakout success of Norwegian Reggaeton, he directed a third video for the song Valhalleluja, released on December the 13th with Napalm Records music label.

He also wrote and directed the virtual reality experience VBI: Lost Connection, produced by AnotheReality in collaboration with IBM.

In 2019 he also co-produced, with his own company The Best Blend, the short movie La Fiamma directed by Giacomo Talamini.

== Filmography ==
=== Director ===
- Ultimo spettacolo (2004), short movie
- L'ultimo giorno del vittoria (2004), documentary
- DNA of angel, soul of devil (2008), documentary
- Wishes on a falling star (2010), documentary
- Standin' Tall (2012), music video
- Cotto & Frullato (2013), web series
- Cotto & Frullato Z - The Crystal Gear (2017), movie
- VBI: Lost Connection (2019), Virtual Reality
- And Then I Noticed That She Was A Gargoyle (2019), music video
- Norwegian Reggaeton (2019), music video
- Valhalleluja (2019), music video
- Uranus (2020), music video

=== Awards ===
- 2005 Digifestival – Best Film for Ultimo spettacolo
- 2010 Valdarno Cinema Fedic – Best Documentary for Wishes on a falling star
- 2014 Los Angeles Web Festival - Best Series, Best Writing for Cotto & Frullato
- 2017 Barcelona Planet Film Festival - Best Narrative Feature Film for Cotto & Frullato Z The Crystal Gear
- 2017 International Independent Film Awards - Best Director, Best Title and Credit Design for Cotto & Frullato Z The Crystal Gear
- 2018 Depth of Field International Film Festival - Outstanding Excellence in Comedy, Award of Excellence in Cinematography and Direction for Cotto & Frullato Z The Crystal Gear
- 2018 European Cinematography Award - Best Comedy, Best Editing for Cotto & Frullato Z The Crystal Gear
