= Winterbane =

Studio album by Frozen Crown
- Released: 23 April 2021
- Genres: Power metal, melodic death metal, heavy metal
- Length: 52:39
- Label: Scarlet Records
- Producer: Filippo Bersani

Frozen Crown chronology
Crowned in Frost (2019)	Winterbane (2021)	Call of the North (2023)

Professional ratings
Review scores
Source	Rating
The Dark Melody	8.7/10
Metal Temple	8/10

Winterbane is the third studio album by Italian power metal band Frozen Crown, released on 23 April 2021. It is their first album by the band with a new lineup that includes guitarist Fabiola "Sheena" Bellomo, bassist Francesco Zof, and drummer Niso Tomasini. The album has received positive feedback from reviewers.

The band consider the album "the most obscure of our works. The third chapter consolidates the classic Frozen Crown trademark sound and brings it to the next level, giving priority to a straightforward and in-your-face approach based on powerful and dynamic drums and thundering bass lines. Guitar work plays a key role again, this time richer and more intricate than ever, drawing catchy melodies along lead singer Giada Etro's vocals." The album has a cover of Judas Priest's "Night Crawler", and singer Federica Lanna from Volturian, a side-project of Mondelli, provided guest vocals in the song "Angels in Disguise". The album had previous videoclips for the songs "Far Beyond" and "Embrace the Night", and released another for "The Water Dancer" based on the novel A Song of Ice and Fire and the TV series Game of Thrones, with a guest appearance of Damien Von Dunkenwald and his Northern Wolfdogs Pack.

== Track listing ==
All tracks are written by Federico Mondelli and Giada "Jade" Etro.

No.	Title	Length
1.	"Embrace the Night"	5:04
2.	"Towards the Sun"	5:39
3.	"Far Beyond"	5:21
4.	"The Lone Stranger"	4:24
5.	"Crown Eternal"	6:29
6.	"The Water Dancer"	5:09
7.	"Angels in Disguise" (featuring Federica Lanna (Volturian))	4:50
8.	"Night Crawler" (Judas Priest cover)	5:00
9.	"Tales of the Forest"	2:00
10.	"Blood on the Snow"	8:43

== Personnel ==
- Giada "Jade" Etro – vocals
- Federico Mondelli – guitars, keyboards, additional vocals
- Fabiola Bellomo – guitars
- Francesco Zof – bass
- Niso Tomasini – drums
