= Te spùo so 'na recia =

Studio album by Catarrhal Noise
- Released: 2004
- Recorded: 2004
- Genre: Heavy metal; hard rock; crossover; comedy rock
- Label: Marco Forieri; Marengo Bros.
- Producer: Catarrhal Noise; Herman Medrano; Studio Majestic

Catarrhal Noise chronology
| Turboamerica (2002) | Te spùo so 'na recia (2004) | Basame el cueo Duplison Platinum Edition (2006) |

Te spùo so 'na recia (I Spit on Your Ear) is an album by Catarrhal Noise released in 2004.

== Track listing ==
1. Rujo (1:55)
2. Fonso 1 (0:31)
3. Bea come el pecato (3:15)
4. Va bon? (4:10)
5. Fonso 2 (0:33)
6. Re d'Italia (3:29)
7. El troia (3:20)
8. Nutrie (3:15)
9. Bira vin whisky graspa (2:26)
10. Rubrica de l'agricoltore (3:59)
11. Do sborae (3:07)
12. Cilliegina (1:55)
13. Foxy Duilio (2:47)
14. No talia bochino (2:43)
15. Ti me domandi (1:00)
16. Pornasso (3:12)
17. El me brocon (2:57)

== Credits ==
- Bullo – vocals
- Albyzzo – guitar
- Ruzo – bass
- Pelle – drums
- Giffo – percussions
- Herman Medrano – guest vocals on Nutrie.

=== Uncredited guests ===
- Duilio – guest vocals on Foxy Duilio
