= Call of the North (album) =

Studio album by Frozen Crown
- Released: 10 March 2023
- Genres: Power metal, symphonic metal
- Length: 53:28
- Label: Scarlet Records
- Producer: Filippo Bersani

Frozen Crown chronology
Winterbane (2021)	Call of the North (2023)	War Hearts (2024)

Professional ratings
Review scores
Source	Rating
Metal Hammer Germany	4/7
Rock Hard	6/10
Powermetal.de	8/10
Ethereal Metalzine	9.4/10
Metal Temple	9/10
Obscuro	4/5

Call of the North is the fourth studio album by Italian power metal band Frozen Crown, released on 10 March 2023. It is their last album released via Scarlet Records before they were signed with Napalm Records. On the day of its release, the band hosted a release party at the Legend Club in Milan, Italy. The following day, the band began a European tour in support of the album alongside the Italian metal group Nanowar of Steel.

== Track listing ==
No.	Title	Length
1.	"Call of the North"	6:24
2.	"Fire in the Sky"	5:09
3.	"Black Heart"	4:21
4.	"Victorious"	5:05
5.	"In a Moment"	5:55
6.	"Legion"	4:27
7.	"Until the End"	4:05
8.	"Now or Never"	5:56
9.	"One for All"	4:55
10.	"Far Away"	7:11

== Personnel ==
- Giada "Jade" Etro – vocals
- Federico Mondelli – guitars, keyboards, additional vocals
- Fabiola Bellomo – guitars, solos on tracks 1, 2, and 5
- Francesco Zof – bass
- Niso Tomasini – drums
