= War Hearts =

Studio album by Frozen Crown
- Released: 18 October 2024
- Genre: Power metal
- Length: 42:33
- Label: Napalm Records
- Producer: Andrea Fusini

Frozen Crown chronology
Call of the North (2023)	War Hearts (2024)	The Legend of the Six Kings (2026)

Professional ratings
Review scores
Source	Rating
Metal Hammer Germany	4.5/7
Rock Hard	6/10
Ghost Cult Magazine	7/10
RAMzine	4/5

War Hearts is the fifth studio album by Italian power metal band Frozen Crown, released on 18 October 2024. It is their first album with guitarist Alessia Lanzone, as well as "the first one as a six-piece band and the first one on Napalm Records, and the first album where all members actually make their appearance on the recording. For these reasons, War Hearts represents a new beginning, a fresh start, and it may be considered the first episode of FROZEN CROWN 'reboot'." However, it is their last album with Fabiola Bellomo who left the band after the tour to focus on personal duties and try other music genres. She was replaced by Serbian guitarist Aleksandra Stamenković, who fronts the band Jenner and adopts the artistic name "Alexandra Lioness".

Guitarist Federico Mondelli has noted his biggest influences for the album to be songs by Yngwie Malmsteen, Sonata Arctica, and Angra. A music video for the single "Steel and Gold" was filmed on Castello dei Doria, in Dolceacqua, Italy. The band promoted the album with their first tour across Europe as the headlining band, alongside the bands Fellowship and Lutharo. The tour lasted through April and May 2025, with the first show of the tour in Memmingen Kaminwerk on 11 April.

== Track listing ==
No.	Title	Length
1.	"War Hearts"	4:35
2.	"Steel and Gold"	4:05
3.	"To Live to Die"	3:41
4.	"Night of the Wolf"	4:09
5.	"On Silver Wings"	4:07
6.	"Edge of Reality"	4:12
7.	"Bloodlines"	4:05
8.	"I Am the Wind"	4:33
9.	"King of the Sky"	1:29
10.	"Ice Dragon"	7:37

== Personnel ==
- Giada "Jade" Etro – vocals
- Federico Mondelli – guitars, keyboards, additional vocals
- Alessia Lanzone – guitars, solos on tracks 1, 2, 3, and 6
- Fabiola Bellomo – guitars, solos on tracks 1, 2, 3, 4, and 6
- Francesco Zof – bass
- Niso Tomasini – drums
