= Maurizio Merluzzo =

Italian voice actor and YouTuber (born 1986)

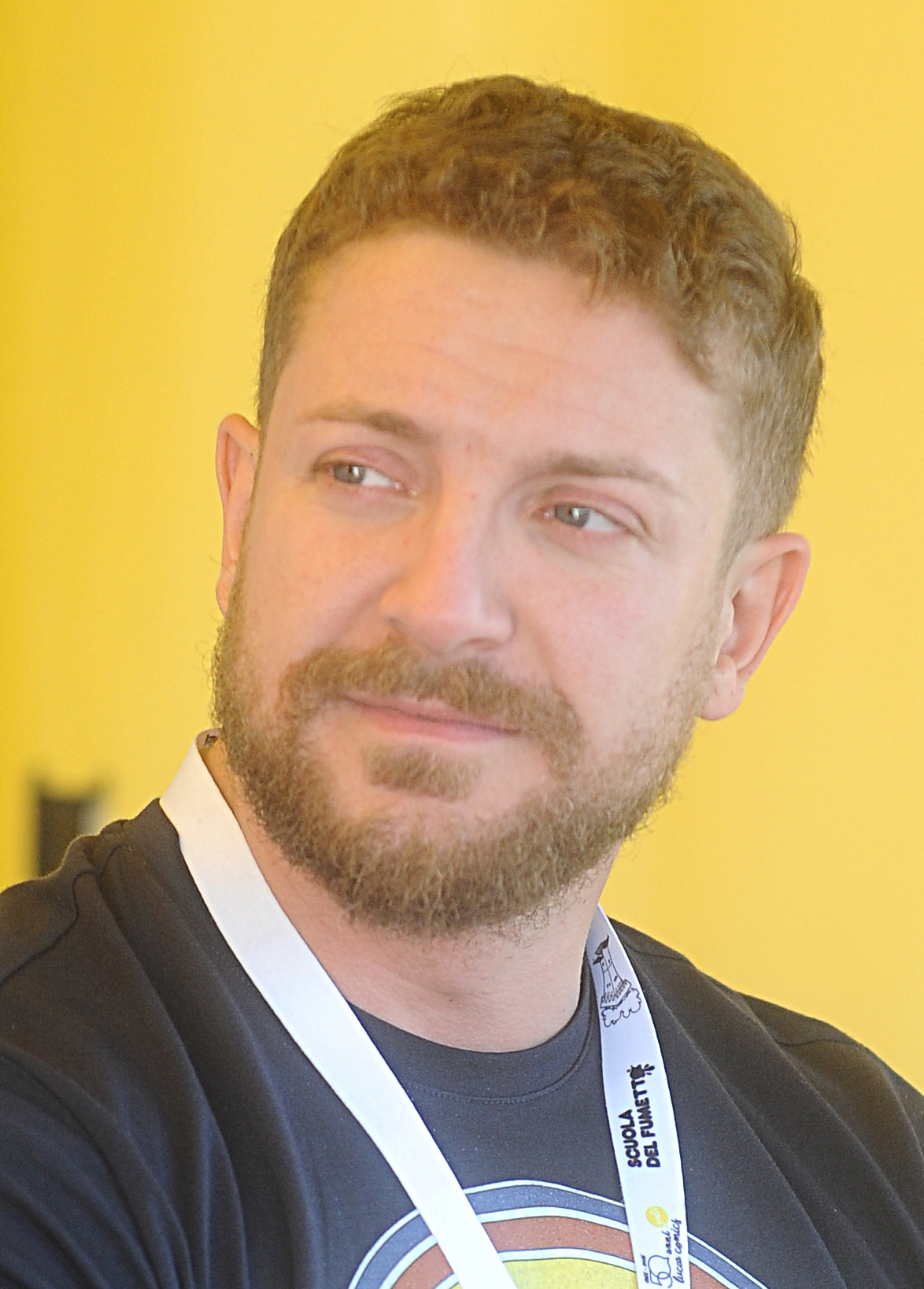
- Maurizio Merluzzo at Lucca Comics & Games 2016
- Born: September 3, 1986 (age 40); Prato, Italy
- Occupations: Voice actor; YouTuber
- Years active: 2007–present

Maurizio Merluzzo (born September 3, 1986) is an Italian voice actor and YouTuber. He contributes to voicing characters in anime, cartoons, movies and other media.

== Biography ==
Merluzzo's most relevant works include dubbing the role of Shazam in the movie Shazam!, Sai in the Italian version of the anime Naruto: Shippuden, André Harris in the Nickelodeon sitcom Victorious, Zamasu in Dragon Ball Super and Ragnar in History's TV show Vikings.

The dubbing studios he works at include Merak Film, ADC Group and Raflesia.

Merluzzo is also a YouTuber and he's acted in the web series Cotto e Frullato and Getalive. He also took a part in the song Bestie di Seitan, along with the Italian parody heavy metal band Nanowar of Steel and in the song L'Ingranaggio di Cristallo with the Italian band Dymama. Both songs were used as the soundtrack of the feature film Cotto & Frullato Z – The Crystal Gear, directed by Paolo Cellammare, in which Merluzzo also played the lead role.

In 2019, Merluzzo dubbed the American actor Zachary Levi the movie Shazam!, making it the first time he dubbed a title character on the big screen.

In 2021, Merluzzo played the role of Capitan Findus in Nanowar of Steel's video for La Maledizione di Capitan Findus alongside Marco Arata (best known as Mark the Hammer).

== Filmography ==
Film performances
Year	Title	Role	Notes
2013	Far Away	Lupo / Ioria	Short film
2017	Cotto & frullato Z: The Crystal Gear	Chef Maurizio	Lead role
2020	Tieni gli occhi chiusi	Assassin	Short film
2023	J Loop	Fighter	

Television performances
Year	Title	Role	Notes
2025	Pesci piccoli	Mike Merluzzo	Episode "Nino e Amedeo" (season 2)
2026	Accidentally Famous	Giuseppe "Maxibon" Santini	2 episodes (season 2)

== Dubbing ==
=== Movies ===
- Billy Batson / Shazam in Shazam!
- Matt Smith in Last night in Soho
- Austin Butler in Elvis

=== Video games ===
- Knuckles the Echidna in the Sonic the Hedgehog series
- Rehgar Earthfury in World of Warcraft/Heroes of the Storm
- Mortiferous in World of Warcraft
- Demon Hunter in Diablo 3
- Reggie in Far Cry 4
- Ezreal in League of Legends
- Jacob Frye in Assassin's Creed Syndicate
- Daniel Cross in Assassin's Creed III
- Jack Cooper in Titanfall 2
- Griff in Call of Duty: Infinite Warfare
- Jäger in Tom Clancy's Rainbow Six Siege
- Helis in Horizon Zero Dawn
- Tennessee Kid Cooper in Sly Cooper: Thieves in Time
- Anarky in Batman: Arkham Origins
- Steve Cortez in Mass Effect 3
- Harris Brecken in Dying Light
- Liu Kang in Mortal Kombat X
- Baptiste in Overwatch
- Troy Calypso in Borderlands 3

=== Anime and animation ===
- Shun Kurosaki (Shay) in Yu-Gi-Oh! Arc-V
- Mirio Togata in My Hero Academia
- Paul in Pokémon
- Oga Tatsumi in Beelzebub
- Sai in Naruto: Shippuden
- Keith Clay/Spectra Phantom in Bakugan Battle Brawlers: New Vestroia
- William in Code Lyoko
- William in Puppy in My Pocket: Adventures in Pocketville
- Akatsuki Kain in Vampire Knight, Vampire Knight Guilty
- Katsuo Mizuno in The Prince of Tennis
- Akatsuki Izumo in Aria the Animation
- Tatsuya Mizuno in Whistle!
- Curio in Romeo x Juliet
- Ling Yao in Fullmetal Alchemist: Brotherhood
- Marcel in Yu-Gi-Oh! GX
- Abengane in Hunter x Hunter
- Lambo (adult) in Reborn!
- Renji Abarai in Bleach: Memories of Nobody, Bleach: The DiamondDust Rebellion
- Riichi Jinnouchi in Summer Wars
- Dash in The Twisted Whiskers Show
- Jason James/Z-Strap in Zevo-3
- Kurt Wagner/Nightcrawler in Wolverine and the X-Men
- Naomi Minamoto in Capeta
- Hajime Kakei in Special A
- Klaus Warwick in Code Geass: Akito the Exiled
- Lord Boros in One Punch Man
- Coby (adult) in One Piece
- Hamelin in MÄR
- Zamasu in Dragon Ball Super
- Buddy Fury in Inazuma Eleven Go Galaxy
- Archer in Fate/Stay Night: Heaven's feel-Presage flower
- Archer in Fate/Stay Night: Unlimited Blade Works
- Cancer Manigoldo in Saint Seiya: The Lost Canvas
- Pip Bernadotte in Hellsing Ultimate
- Knuckles the Echidna in Sonic the Hedgehog 2, Knuckles, Sonic the Hedgehog 3
- Satan in Helluva Boss

=== Live-action series ===
- Andre Harris in Victorious
- Ram Ramachandran in How to Be Indie
- DS James Hathaway in Lewis
- Markus Zastrow in Sturm der Liebe
- Bryson in My Life as Liz
- Raul Clavatti in Isa TKM
- Guido Lassen in Rebelde Way
- Darryl Smith in Sea Patrol (1st dub)
- Jimmy Madigan in True Jackson, VP
- Milky in This Is England
- Toby in Mega Mindy
- Colin O'Flaherty in Worst.Prom.Ever.
- Ragnar Lothbrok in Vikings
- Jonathan Scott in Property Brothers, Brother vs. Brother
- Kevin in A Series of Unfortunate Events
- Barry in Van Helsing (TV series)
- "Number Two" Diego Hargreeves in The Umbrella Academy
- Dr. Benjamin Ettenberg in The Marvelous Mrs. Maisel
