= Crowned in Frost =

Studio album by Frozen Crown
- Released: 22 March 2019
- Genres: Power metal, heavy metal
- Length: 47:51
- Label: Scarlet Records
- Producer: Filippo Bersani

Frozen Crown chronology
The Fallen King (2018)	Crowned in Frost (2019)	Winterbane (2021)

Professional ratings
Review scores
Source	Rating
Dead Rhetoric	7.5/10
Metal Temple	9/10
My Global Mind	8/10

Crowned in Frost is the second studio album by Italian power metal band Frozen Crown, released on 22 March 2019. Three music videos was released for the songs "Neverending" (also issued as a single), "In the Dark" and "Battles in the Night".

== Track listing ==
No.	Title	Length
1.	"Arctic Gales"	1:24
2.	"Neverending"	5:09
3.	"In the Dark"	4:43
4.	"Battles in the Night"	4:21
5.	"Winterfall"	7:30
6.	"Unspoken"	4:03
7.	"Lost in Time"	4:31
8.	"The Wolf and the Maiden"	3:25
9.	"Forever"	5:09
10.	"Enthroned"	1:03
11.	"Crowned in Frost"	6:33

Japanese edition bonus track
No.	Title	Length
12.	"The King's Rest"	3:54

== Personnel ==
- Giada "Jade" Etro – vocals
- Federico Mondelli – all guitars and keyboards, lead and backing vocals
- Alberto Mezzanotte – drums
- Filippo Zavattari – bass
