= Baryonyx (band) =

Italian pop rock band

- Origin: Italy
- Genres: Indie rock Indie pop Alternative rock Electro rock Pop rock
- Years active: 2008–2021
- Label: Audioglobe
- Members: Matteo Ceccarini; Antonio Morelli
- Past members: Alessio Luchetta; Francesco Mannucci; Jacopo Baldacci; Tommaso Masini; Nicola Burini; Andrea Fede
- Website: baryonyxband.com

Baryonyx is an Italian indie pop rock band founded in Livorno (Italy) in 2008.

== History ==
The nucleus of the group was born at the end of 2007 from the idea of the founders, Matteo Ceccarini (vocals) and Antonio Morelli (guitar). The duo begins as a teenage pop rock band. The following year the drummer Alessio Luchetta joins the band and in 2009 they have their discographic debut with the album "Black Out". The album is made of nine tracks divided in two parts: the A-Side sung in Italian and next published as independent EP, the B-side sung in English with a pop punk Californian style, from which they have extracted in the following years some tracks included in various compilations.

From 2010 the band experiences new alternative rock's sounds which lead to the release of the single "Pensieri" for Play Record Company and in 2012 to the release of the EP "Trias" ("NoSen" and "Nuvole di vetro" as tip songs) released next by New Dimensional Era (UK) and Ghostrecord (Italy).

Between 2011 and 2012 the group was included in a video rotate program called U-ZONE on the national channel Mediaset Italia 2 with the videoclip of the song "P.P.F.": the song become one of the Top 100 video most transmitted on TV. They also participate in an interview with live unplugged for the Mexican national channel "Say Yeah TV".

In 2015, the band is back to be composed of the original duo (Antonio and Matteo) with the collaboration of occasional musicians: in this new phase, experimenting with the use of electronic music, outlined an electro rock style.

In 2016, it was released "Fuori il Blizzard" with alternative electro rock sounds, distributed in Italy by Audioglobe and The Orchard and internationally by Code7 via Plastic Head. To accompany the release of the new album, the group make a tour in Italy promoting the CD in radio and TV .

In 2017, the band enters for the first time in the "Euro Indie Music Chart" on 113th position with the song "Mondo a Colori" of the album "Fuori il Blizzard".

In the summer of 2017, the single "Lighlty Sunrise" is released in collaboration with the DJ Kinlax.

In 2018 the band create a remix from the song “Pensieri” and they call it “Farsi Trascinare”: this song close the musical phase began with "Fuori il Blizzard". In fact in the second part of 2018 they announce a new musical experimentation in the modern Italian indie music. About this, they published seven singles from "Mistico" (2018) to "Zebrasino" (2021).

In 2021 the band decides to take a break and opening to personal solists projects.

== Members ==
=== Current ===
- Matteo Ceccarini – vocals (2008–2021)
- Antonio Morelli – guitar (2008–2021)

=== Former ===
- Alessio Luchetta – drums (2008–2015)
- Andrea Fede – keyboard (2008–2010)
- Nicola Burini – bass (2009–2010)
- Tommaso Masini – bass (2010–2011)
- Jacopo Baldacci – bass (2011–2014)
- Francesco Mannucci – bass (2014–2015)

== Discography ==
=== Studio albums ===
- Black Out (2009)
- Fuori il Blizzard (2016)

=== EPs ===
- Black Out (2011)
- Trias (2012)

=== Singles ===
- "Pensieri" (2010)
- "NoSen" (2010) [released 22 September 2010; 1st single from Trias]
- "Everything You Can See From The Space" (2011) [released 9 December 2011; 1st single from Black Out]
- "Nuvole di Vetro" (2013) [released 21 October 2013; 2nd single from Trias]
- "P.P.F." (2014) [released 1 October 2014; 1st single from Fuori il Blizzard]
- "Voce84" (2015) [released 8 December 2015; 2nd single from Fuori il Blizzard]
- "Lightly Sunrise" feat. Kinlax (2017)
- "Farsi Trascinare" (2018)
- "Mistico" (2018)
- "Demone" (2019)
- "Quarzo" (2019)
- "Umami" (2020)
- "Birramisù" (2020)
- "Bundesliga" (2020)
- "Zebrasino" (2021)

=== Chart Positions ===
Song title	Released	Label	Format	Peak chart positions
Mondo a Colori	June, 2016	Audioglobe; The Orchard	Streaming	113° Euro Indie Music Chart

=== Compilations ===
Appears on:

- Rockol Mixtape Vol. 1 (2009)
- Vs. The World Vol. 9 (2011)
- Mp3 Goes Metal Vol. 2 (2011)
- All You Need Is Punk Vol. 2 (2012)
- Italy Loves Rock (2012)

== Collaborations ==
=== Italy ===
Mediaset, Digster Italy, Audioglobe, Woodworm Label, Il Tirreno, Rockit, Rockol, PaperStreet, Tele Venezia, OkRadio Network, Noloser Record, Italia di Metallo, Mondo Metal, Onda Alternativa, Love & Sound Magazine, Undergroung Webzine, All you need is Punk, MetalWave, Musictracks.com, Given to rock Magazine, Nel muschio Magazine, MusicMap

=== United States ===
Vevo, The Orchard, Blank TV, Distrophonix

=== Mexico ===
SayYeah TV

=== United Kingdom ===
Rormix, New Dimensional Era

=== Switzerland ===
RockLabel TV, iTalents TV

=== Germany ===
Artnoir - Musik Magazin

=== Republic of Ireland ===
MUZU.TV

=== South Korea ===
Pandora TV
