= Francesca Dani =

Italian travel photographer (born 1979)

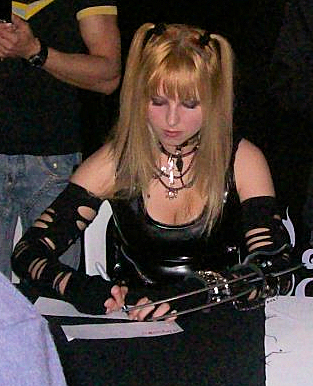
- Francesca Dani at SOFA 2009 (Bogota, Colombia).
- Born: Francesca Aurora Dani; 5 March 1979 (age 47); Florence, Italy
- Website: www.francescadani.com

Francesca Dani, sometimes referred to as Francesca Aurora Dani, (born 5 March 1979 in Florence, Tuscany, Italy) is an Italian travel photographer, and a former cosplayer, net idol model and jewelry designer.

== Cosplay and modeling career ==
Dani began her cosplay career in November 1998 after participating in Lucca Comics and Games as Sailor Moon. She claims to have participated at the request of a friend, whom she had produced cosplay clothes for earlier on. Dani unexpectedly won an award at the contest, which granted her local fame and kickstarted her career.

Dani quickly launched her website under the GeoCities free hosting service, subsequently transferring it under her own domain francescadani.com in 2001. She launched a pay website on 14 April 2002. The website used to feature short videos and thousands of photographs depicting her posing in various risque outfits, swimsuits, lingerie, and other fetish outfits. Although often showing very provocative outfit, Dani has reportedly never posed fully naked pictures, in spite of numerous requests she claims to have received in that regard.

From April 2002 to September 2005 she modeled for an American paysite called Varietease, but in October 2005 she left the site for her own paysite under the domain francescadani.com.

Dani gained fame in Japan on 25 December 2002, during an appearance on popular TV show Sekai Marumie, directed by Takeshi Kitano, aired on Nippon TV. Dani was chosen for a special live interview, filmed in her hometown, because of her status as an international cosplayer.

Three years later, Dani gained global fame after winning the World Cosplay Summit in Nagoya, Japan, in 2005 as a member of the Italian team, which also featured Giorgia Vecchini (who also went on to become a prominent cosplayer) and the Livia Fata sisters.

The event boosted her popularity in Japan. Immediately after the event, she was chosen as a spokesmodel for Bodyline, a Japanese manufacturer of Gothic and Lolita dresses: Francesca's photos appeared on Bodyline packages. At the end of 2005, Livedoor, an Internet service provider based in Tokyo, Japan, started selling Francesca's digital photo-books at DLsite, a digital distribution website.

Dani has appeared in dozens in magazines around the world, most notably for Maxim who hailed her as "¡La cosplayer más popular en la web!" ("The most popular cosplayer on the web!") In 2008 she published a video DVD titled DNA of Angel, Soul of Devil, celebrating 10 years of her career. It includes a documentary on her story, directed and produced by her longtime photographer and partner, Paolo Cellammare. By his own admission, Cellammare's career as an international cosplay photographer has started and flourished thanks to a long-standing partnership with Dani.

In 2011, Francesca Dani was featured in an Italian-language book by Francesca Mazzuccato, as an example of a person who has chosen strip-tease as a way to express creativity.

Among others, Dani has participated in Cosplay fairs and events in Italy, Japan, Mexico, Chile, Colombia and Brazil, where she was asked to stage a performance to present a new manga called Death Note. Francesca has personally produced dozens of costumes during her long cosplay career, taking pride in the fact that all her costumes have been made solely by her.

== Jewellery design and retirement from modeling ==
In 2010 Dani began designing her own brand of gothic-inspired jewellery, launching under the brand name of My Bones. She launched a specific website for this product line, which was online under the francescadanistore.com URL until 2015.

The last public cosplay event that Francesca has been seen at is Novegro Comics, Italy, in February 2010, where she acted as an honorary jury member. There she portrayed famous videogame character Princess Zelda. Following that and a few other photosets that she published on her website, Dani suddenly retired from cosplay and modelling, and ceased appearing in public events such as fairs and contests. Her website was left online with the existing content. However, no new content had been added until it was replaced by her new photography site in 2015.

== Travel photography career ==
In 2015 Dani took up photography, focusing initially on nocturnal landscapes shot in the surrounding of her hometown Florence. During a trip to Northern Norway in late 2015, she took her first photography of the Northern lights, a theme she continues to develop still today. She claims that her pictures have a recurring theme, with small human shapes lost in large, empty spaces. According to Dani, this enhances the insignificant role that human beings play, when compared to the immense power of nature.

In 2017 she joined LappOne, a Swedish tour operator, where she currently performs various duties such as photographic tour leader, marketing, IT and web site development.

Her photography works have exhibited in Rome, London, Paris and New York. One of her photographic projects, Ghosts of Chernobyl, is aimed to raise awareness among future generations of the consequences of the Chernobyl disaster, which, in Dani's words "has killed not only people, but also families, history and human dignity". She regularly arranges guided tours to the Chernobyl exclusion zone and Pripyat in Ukraine, organized through an Italian travel agent.

Other than her website, Dani makes widespread use of social networks to display her work.
