= The Legend of the Six Kings =

Studio album by Frozen Crown
- Released: 2 October 2026
- Genre: Power metal
- Length: 36:06
- Label: Napalm
- Producer: Federico Mondelli

Frozen Crown chronology
War Hearts (2024)	The Legend of the Six Kings (2026)

Singles from The Legend of the Six Kings
- 1. "The One" Released: 24 June 2026; 2. "Reborn" Released: 28 July 2026; 3. "Who Wants to Burn in Heaven" Released: 26 August 2026; 4. "Iris" Released: 1 October 2026

Professional ratings
Review scores
Source	Rating
Distorted Sound	8/10
Rock Hard	5/10

The Legend of the Six Kings is the sixth studio album by Italian power metal band Frozen Crown, released on 2 October 2026. It is their first album with guitarist Aleksandra Stamenković, who fronts the band Jenner and adopts the artistic name "Alexandra Lioness", replacing Fabiola Bellomo who left the band the previous year to focus on personal duties and try other music genres.

Music videos were released for the singles "The One", "Reborn", "Who Wants to Burn in Heaven", and their cover of "Iris" by Goo Goo Dolls. The Exclusive Wooden Box edition of the album includes a bonus EP titled Untold Legends, which features an acoustic version of "Reborn" and acoustic covers of "Mirror Mirror" by Blind Guardian and "Center of the Universe" by Kamelot. The band have discussed touring with Kamelot to promote the album.

== Track listing ==
No.	Title	Length
1.	"Lightning in the Sky"	3:35
2.	"Who Wants to Burn in Heaven"	3:56
3.	"Reborn"	3:33
4.	"The One"	3:09
5.	"Iris" (Goo Goo Dolls cover)	3:45
6.	"Winter Hearts"	3:21
7.	"River of Time"	3:25
8.	"Through the Fire"	3:02
9.	"To the Stars"	3:29
10.	"The Legend of the Six Kings"	4:51

== Personnel ==
- Giada "Jade" Etro – vocals
- Federico Mondelli – guitars, keyboards, additional vocals
- Alessia Lanzone – guitars
- Alexandra Lioness – guitars
- Francesco Zof – bass
- Niso Tomasini – drums

== Charts ==
Chart performance for The Legend of the Six Kings
Chart (2026)	Peak position
Austrian Albums (Ö3 Austria)	66
Japanese Rock Albums (Oricon)	20
Japanese Western Albums (Oricon)	14
