= Catarrhal Noise =

Italian metal band

- Origin: Noale, Italy
- Genres: Thrash metal Comedy rock Crossover thrash
- Years active: 1994–2007, 2015–2017
- Labels: Marco Forieri; B&B Communications
- Members: Albyzzo; Bullo; Pyzzo
- Past members: Frankie Bello; Brasilian Bass; Gassolato; Giffo; Pelle; Rocky Gio
- Website: Catarrhalnoise.net

Catarrhal Noise is a thrash/comedy metal band from Noale, Veneto, Italy.

The band was founded in September 1994, when Albyzzo and Ruzo (later known as Bullo) chose the name after a deep search inside an English dictionary.

They sing in Venetian, which is very hard to understand for foreigners, and even for an Italian living outside Veneto. Moreover, their lyrics are off-the-wall, with a heavy use of colloquial terms: a common concept in their concerts is the one of rujo, that can be approximately translated as extreme rudeness and impoliteness and is often a term applied to people living in the country.

The band was able to create a large following in Veneto and in other parts of northern Italy thanks to their highly energetic live shows.

They have successfully given 300 concerts, alternating powerful metal songs with comic segments. On July 3, 2004 they opened a concert for thrash metal band Anthrax.

Since then, they have headlined several important independent hard rock festival in Veneto, such as Monteciorock in Montecchio Maggiore, Rockonte in Villa del Conte and MarcOn Festival in Marcon.

On October 17, 2007 singer Bullo announced that all the other members had left Catarrhal Noise.

On 19 September 2015 Bullo put together the old formation of the band with Albyzzo, Pyzzo, Gifo and Pelle for the Mai Paura Day, a charity event in Dolo, and played as headliner. More than 10000 thousand people gathered for the special occasion.

== Members ==
=== Current ===
- Bullo (Daniele Russo) - voce
- Albyzzo (Alberto Varosi) - chitarra
- Massimo Cocchetto - basso
- Luca Roveran - batteria

=== Past ===
- Brazilian Bass aka Bras - bass, guitar
- Frankie Bello (Alberto Bello) - drums
- Gassolato - bass
- Giffo (Enrico Vallotto) - percussions
- Pelle - drums (previously vocals)
- Il Buttaz (Enrico Buttol) - drums
- Pyzzo (Andrea Giada) - bass
- Rocky Gio (Giovanni Gatto) - bass, guitar

Regularly guest-starring on their albums and concerts was Herman Medrano, a Venetian rapper.

== Discography ==
=== Studio albums ===
- Radio Rizzox (self-produced, 1997)
- Gli sbronzi di Rialto (self-produced, 1999)
- Basame el cueo (self-produced, 2001)
- Turboamerica (2002)
- Te spùo so 'na recia (2004)
- Basame el cueo Duplison Platinum Edition 2006 (2006)
- A porchettata (2006)

=== Live albums ===
- Live in Villa Errera '95 (1996)
- Live in Home festival 2016(2016)

=== Singles ===
- Tutti chiavano (ma io no) (self-produced, 1995)
- Benesso scute servis (self-produced, 2014)
- Uno 1000 Fire (self-produced, 2018)
- Sal San (self-produced, 2019)

=== Demos ===
- 1996 Demo (self-produced, 1996)

== See also ==
- Nanowar of Steel
- Massacration
- Venetian language
- Veneto
