= The Fallen King =

Studio album by Frozen Crown
- Released: 24 January 2018
- Genre: Power metal
- Length: 44:29
- Labels: Avalon, Scarlet
- Producer: Filippo Bersani

Frozen Crown chronology
The Fallen King (2018)	Crowned in Frost (2019)

Professional ratings
Review scores
Source	Rating
Dead Rhetoric	7/10
Metal Hammer	72/100
Metal Reviews	83/100
Metal Temple	9/10
MMH Radio	3/5
My Global Mind	9/10

The Fallen King is the debut studio album by Italian power metal band Frozen Crown, released on 24 January 2018 in Japan, and 9 February 2018 elsewhere. The album has received positive feedback.

== Track listing ==
No.	Title	Length
1.	"Fail No More"	4:09
2.	"To Infinity"	4:11
3.	"Kings"	4:07
4.	"I Am the Tyrant"	4:48
5.	"The Shieldmaiden"	5:50
6.	"Chasing Lights"	4:47
7.	"Queen of Blades"	4:19
8.	"Across the Sea"	4:45
9.	"Everwinter"	3:38
10.	"Netherstorm"	3:55

Japanese edition bonus track
No.	Title	Length
11.	"The Shieldmaiden (live acoustic version)"	4:15

== Personnel ==
- Giada "Jade" Etro – vocals
- Federico Mondelli – guitars, keyboards, additional vocals
- Filippo Zavattari – bass, additional vocals on tracks 9 and 10
- Alberto Mezzanotte – drums
- Thalìa Bellazecca – guitar solo on track 3
