= Volturian =

Italian symphonic metal band

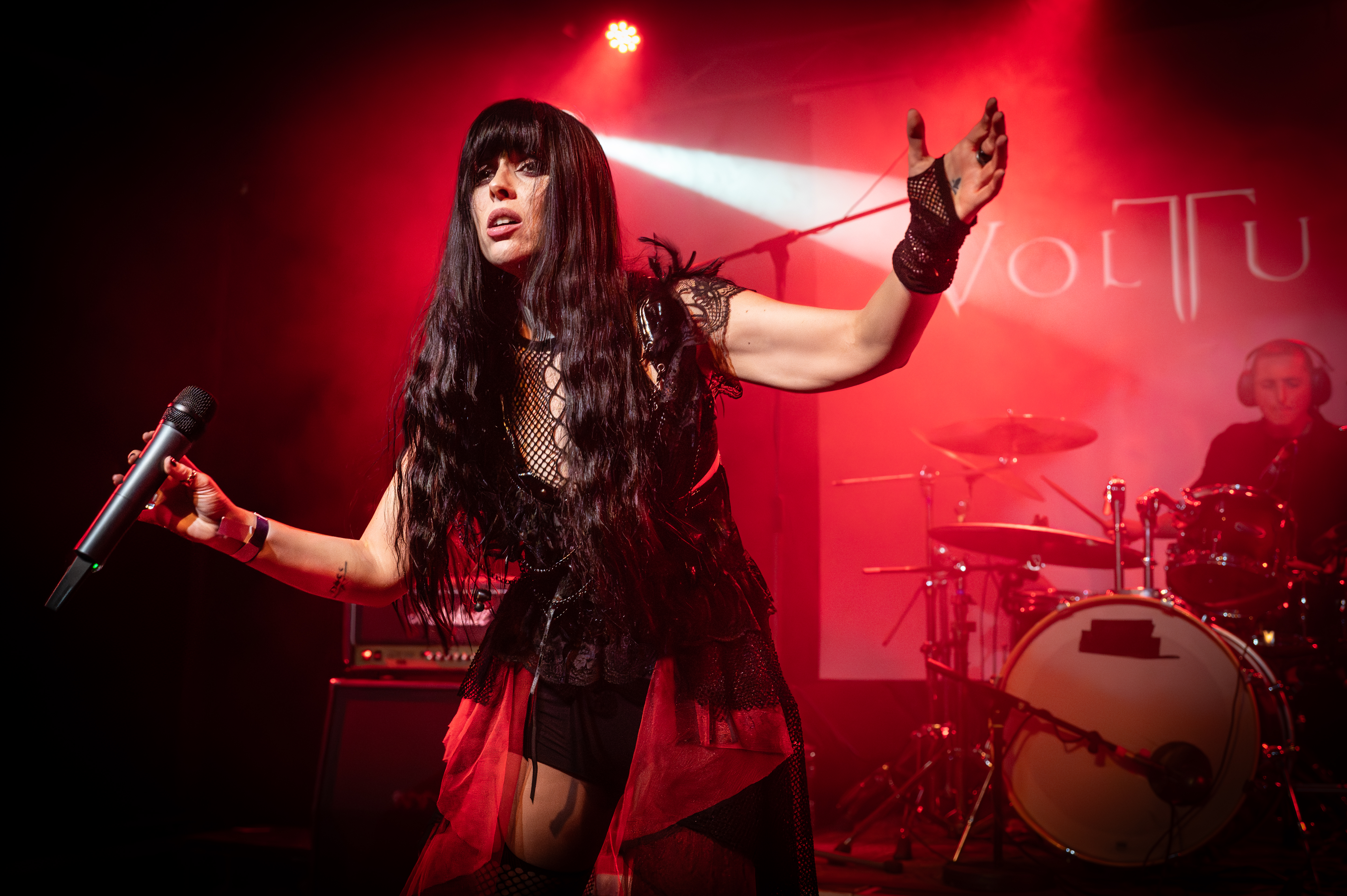

Background information
- Origin: Italy
- Genres: Symphonic metal
- Years active: 2019–present
- Label: Scarlet Records
- Members: Federica Lanna; Federico Mondelli; Massimiliano Rossi; Andrea Zannin
- Past members: Alberto Mezzanotte
- Website: scarletrecords.it/artists/volturian/

Volturian is an Italian symphonic metal band.

== History ==
Volturian started as a project of Federico Mondelli from Frozen Crown. He said he enjoys writing songs more than to playing an instrument, and that several songs he wrote justified a whole new band with a different style. He worked in this project with Federica Lanna, singer of Sleeping Romance. They met during the Milady Metal Fest in Mantua. Mondelli wrote songs specifically for Lanna's singing style, tastes and personality.

The debut studio album, Crimson, was released in 2021. Mondelli and Lanna attempted to combine their influences of 1990's pop and heavy metal with lyrics and imagery reminiscent of films such as Underworld, Van Helsing, and Blade. It includes a guest appearance by Frozen Crown's singer Giada Etro in the song "In A Heartbeat", which contrasts their singing styles. They lived together for some days during the recording and became friends. The album ends with a cover of Roxette's song "Fading Like a Flower". This song was recorded as an homage to Marie Fredriksson, who died in 2019. The band made videos for both songs and for the singles "Broken", "Haunting Symphony", "The Killing Joke" and "New Life". The COVID-19 lockdowns in Italy forced the band members to stay at their homes, so for the video of the single "Broken" each one filmed scenes on their own and they were mixed together later. Lanna mentioned that the scenes filmed in a room with black walls take place in her attic. The video of the single "Haunting Symphony" was filmed right after the end of the lockdowns, and features lots of outdoor scenes. Crimson was also released as a vinyl album, and the band celebrated it with an acoustic version of the song "Days Before You Died".

The second studio album, Red Dragon, was released in 2022. The name is a reference to the novel "Red Dragon", and the lyrics are influenced by it and by graphic novels by Alan Moore and Frank Miller.

In September 2022, they played a concert at the Legend Club, in Milano, with Infected Rain. In March 2023, they opened for Frozen Crown. Federica was invited on stage by Giada Etro to sing "Angels in Disguise". She was also invited for the concert's final song, a cover of Helloween's "I Want Out", which included Grace Darkling and Rehn Stillnight from Nocturna. In October 2024, Volturian was announced as part of the line-up for the 2025 edition of Milady Metal Fest, held on 18 January 2025 in Matua, Italy.

== Band members ==
Current

- Federica Lanna – vocals (2019–present)
- Federico Mondelli – guitars, keyboards, vocals (2019–present)
- Massimiliano Rossi – bass (2019–present)
- Andrea Zannin – drums (2021–present)

Former

- Alberto Mezzanotte – drums (2019–2020)

== Discography ==
Studio albums

- Crimson (2020)
- Red Dragon (2022)
