= Frozen Crown =

Italian power metal band

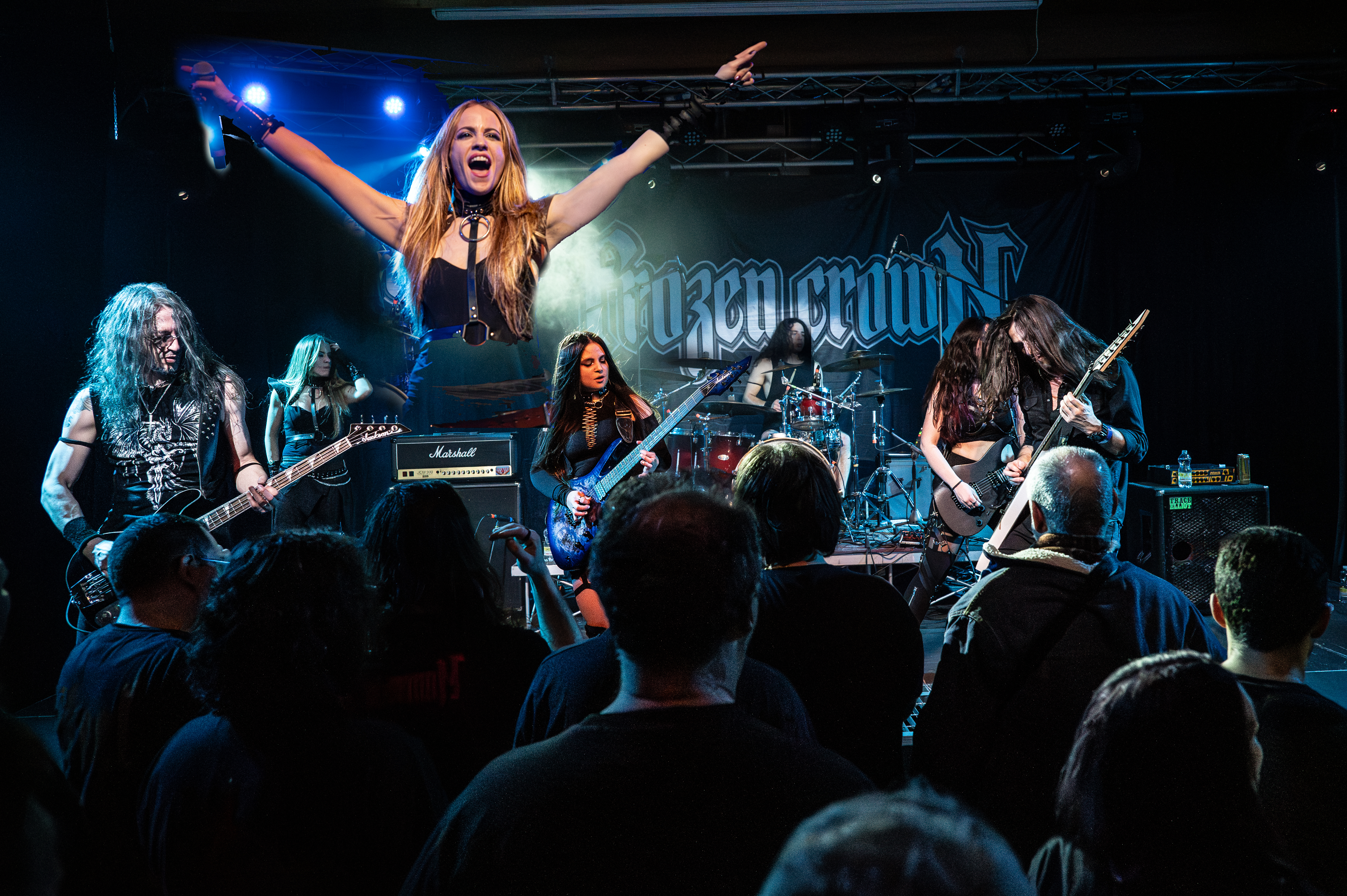
- Frozen Crown heading the Milady Metalfest 2025

Background information
- Origin: Milan, Italy
- Genres: Power metal; heavy metal; symphonic metal
- Years active: 2017–present
- Labels: Scarlet Records, Napalm Records
- Members: Giada "Jade" Etro; Federico Mondelli; Francesco Zof; Niso Tomasini; Alessia Lanzone; Alexandra Lioness
- Past members: Thalia Bellazecca; Filippo Zavattari; Alberto Mezzanotte; Fabiola "Sheena" Bellomo
- Website: frozencrown.net

Frozen Crown is an Italian power metal band formed in 2017 in Milan, Lombardy.

== History ==
After releasing their first two albums, The Fallen King and Crowned in Frost, Frozen Crown played ten European venues in April 2019, together with Israeli metal act Desert and fellow Italian act Elvenking, while in the following summer they appeared at Metalfest Czech Republic and Sabaton Open Air in Sweden. In February 2020, they toured 13 European cities in support of British metal group DragonForce. A summer tour in 2020 including venues in Spain had to be called off due to the COVID-19 pandemic. In November 2020, the band announced that their third album was officially in pre-production.

The band announced in January 2021 that Alberto Mezzanotte, Thalia Bellazecca, and Filippo Zavattari left the band for personal reasons, as they found it difficult to be part of a band during the lockdown. The band released a final video with the original lineup, "Battles in the Night", as a farewell to those members. A month later the band announced the new members, guitarist Fabiola "Sheena" Bellomo, bassist Francesco Zof and drummer Niso Tomasini. The new members were announced alongside the new album, Winterbane. The album was already underway when the former members left, and as Mondelli and Etro are the main songwriters of the band their departure was not a significant delay.

Winterbane was released in April by Scarlett Records, and by Marquee Inc. / Avalon in Japan. The band said "Winterbane is the third Frozen Crown album, and by far the most obscure of our works. The third chapter consolidates the classic Frozen Crown trademark sound and brings it to the next level, giving priority to a straightforward and in-your-face approach based on powerful and dynamic drums and thundering bass lines. Guitar work plays a key role again, this time richer and more intricate than ever, drawing catchy melodies along lead singer Giada Etro's vocals." The album has a cover of Judas Priest's "Night Crawler", and singer Federica Lanna from Volturian, a side-project of Mondelli, provided guest vocals in the song "Angels in Disguise". The album had previous videoclips for the songs "Far Beyond" and "Embrace the Night", and released another for "The Water Dancer" alongside the album. The aesthetics of this videoclip were based on the novel A Song of Ice and Fire and the TV series Game of Thrones, and had a guest appearance of Damien Von Dunkenwald and his Northern Wolfdogs Pack.

On 10 March 2023, Frozen Crown released its fourth studio album, Call of the North. The following day, the band began touring in support of the album and fellow Italian metal act Nanowar of Steel across 19 European venues.

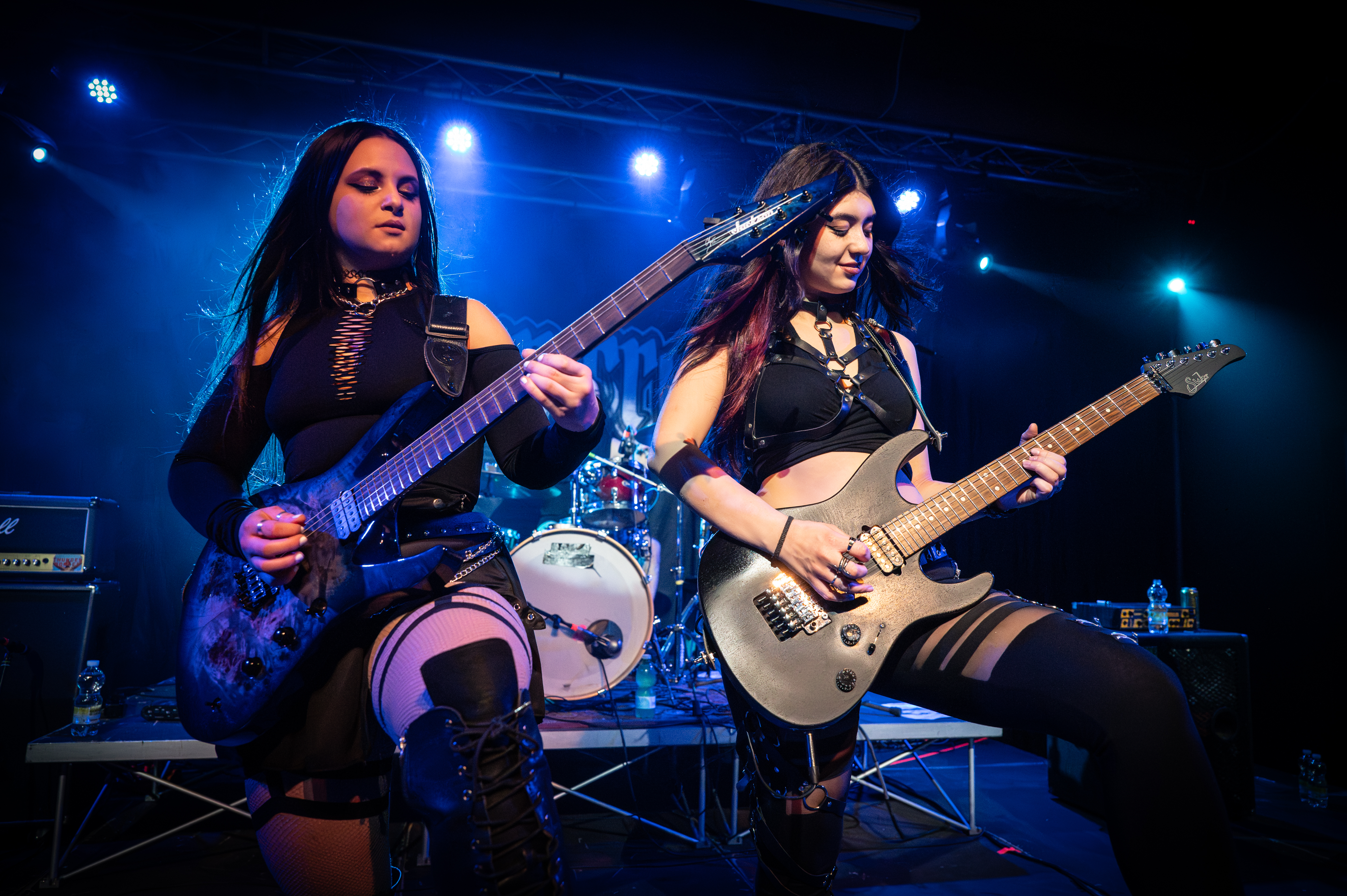
Fabiola Bellomo (left) and Alessia Lanzone (right).

In June 2023 the band announced to have signed a deal with Napalm Records for the release of their upcoming album, leaving Scarlet Records with which they released all the records until then.

On 5 September 2023, Frozen Crown announced the addition of Alessia Lanzone, a third guitarist. Lanzone, aged 18, had only played in a local cover band before then. She was a fan of Frozen Crown and followed them on social networks, the band met her because of her videos playing guitar. As for the reason to bring a third guitarist, Mondelli explained that the band writes highly complex guitar solos, sometimes in excess of 16 guitar layers, and that they are too complex for him and Bellomo to properly play live. The sound engineers proposed to use backing tracks, but Mondelli rejected the idea. He preferred to add a new real person to the band. He also liked the idea to expand the band, which he called "The Frozen Crown family", for social reasons.

War Hearts, the fifth album and the first with Napalm Records, was released in October 2024. They said that "War Hearts is our fifth album, but it's also the first one as a six-piece band and the first one on Napalm Records. It's also the first album where all members actually make their appearance on the recording. For these reasons, War Hearts represents a new beginning, a fresh start, and it may be considered the first episode of FROZEN CROWN ‘reboot’." The first single for the album was "Steel and Gold", filmed on Castello dei Doria, in Dolceacqua, Italy. The band headed the Milady Metal Fest at the end of 2024. This is followed by their first tour across Europe as the headlining band, alongside the bands Fellowship and Lutharo. Fabiola Bellomo left the band after the tour, to focus on personal duties and try other music genres. She was replaced by Serbian guitarist Aleksandra Stamenković, who fronts the band Jenner and adopts the artistic name "Alexandra Lioness". Besides her role as a guitarist, she aids Mondelli in videomaking, producer and manager work. Although she lives at a distant country, the band took her as a member because of the help she provided during Jade's health problems and the lineup changes.

The band was announced as a supporting act for Kamelot on the Dark Asylum Tour in North America on February 24, 2026, with along with Visions of Atlantis. The band will release their upcoming sixth album, The Legend of the Six Kings, On 2 October 2026.

== Band members ==
Members of Frozen Crown
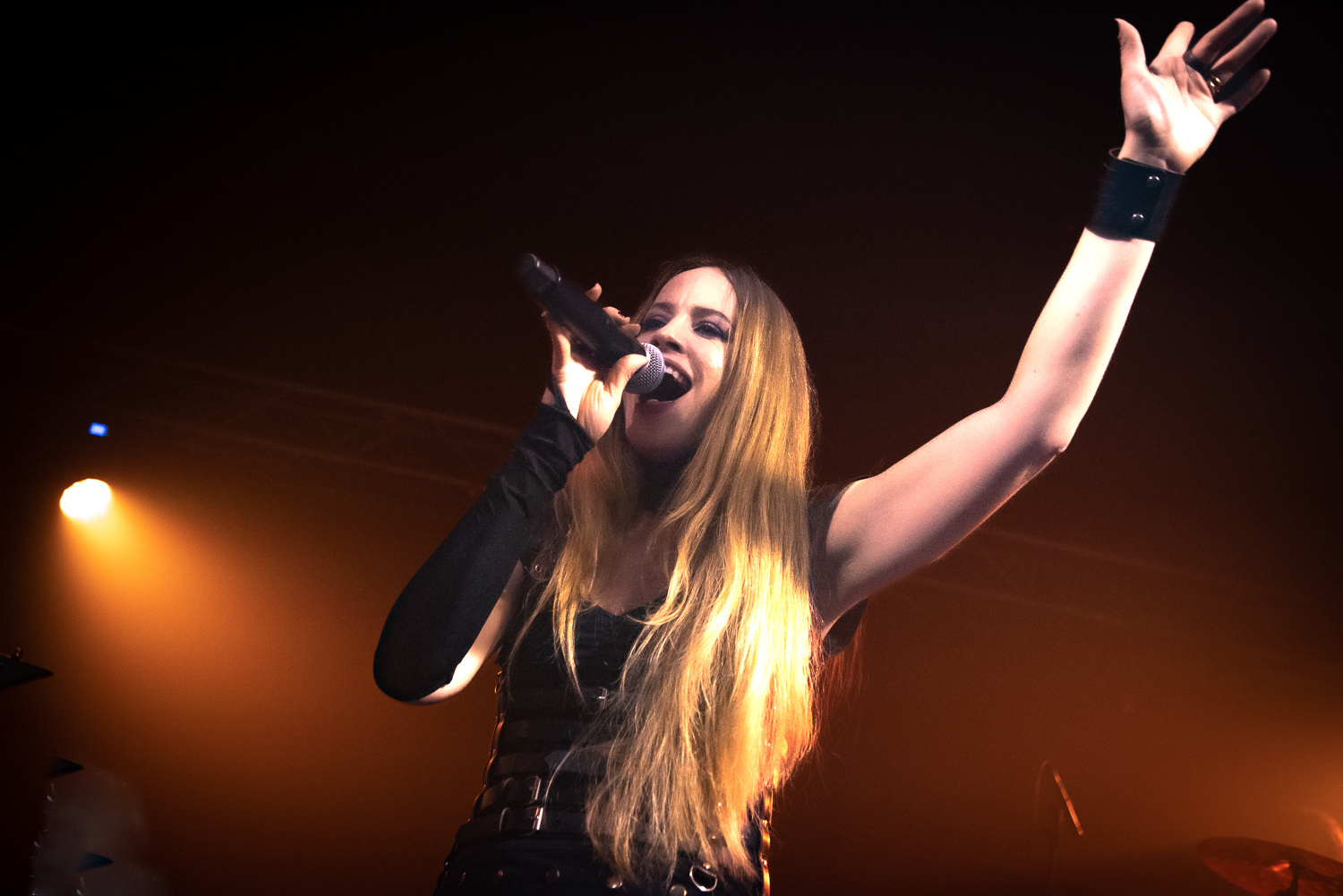
Giada Etro

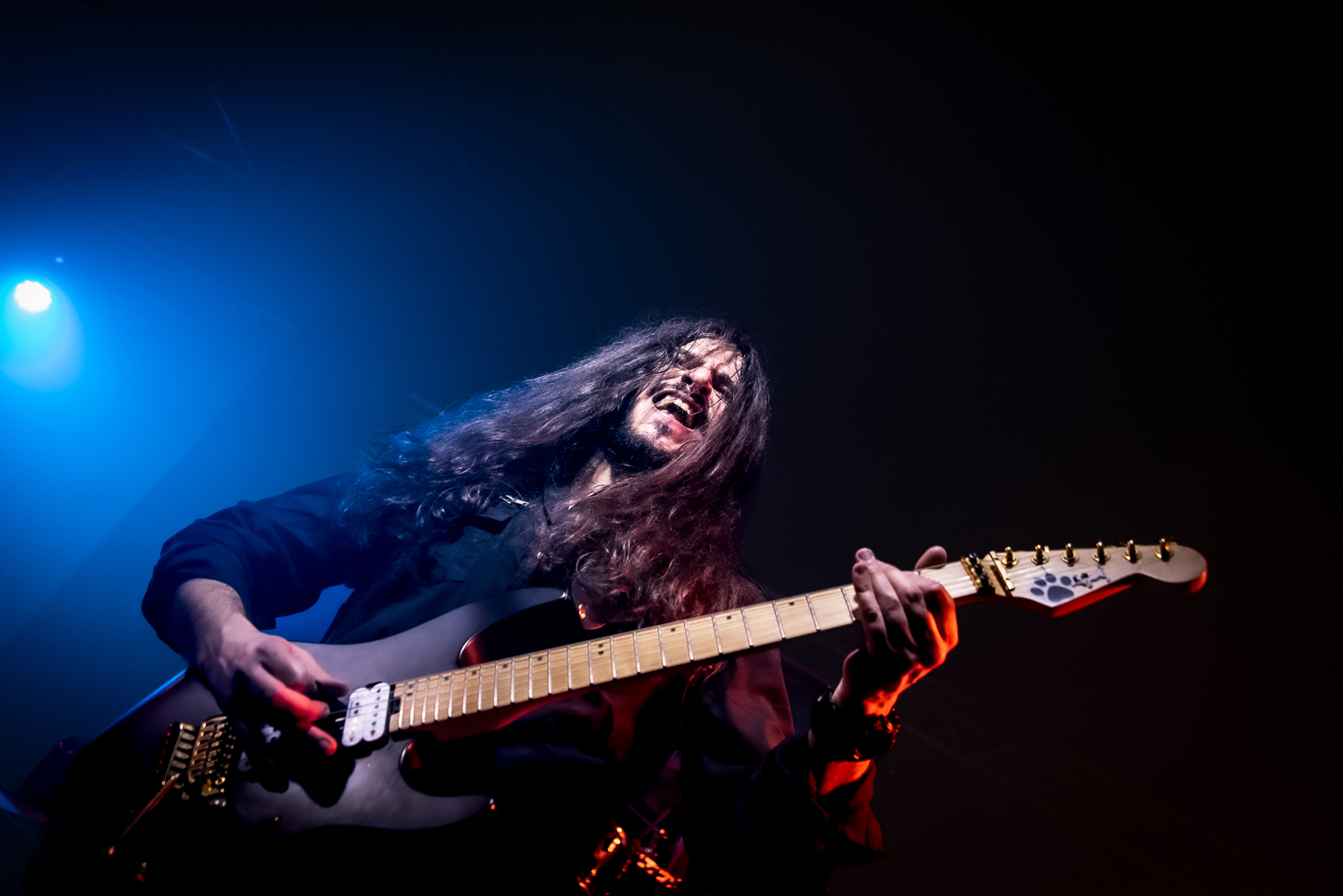
Federico Mondelli

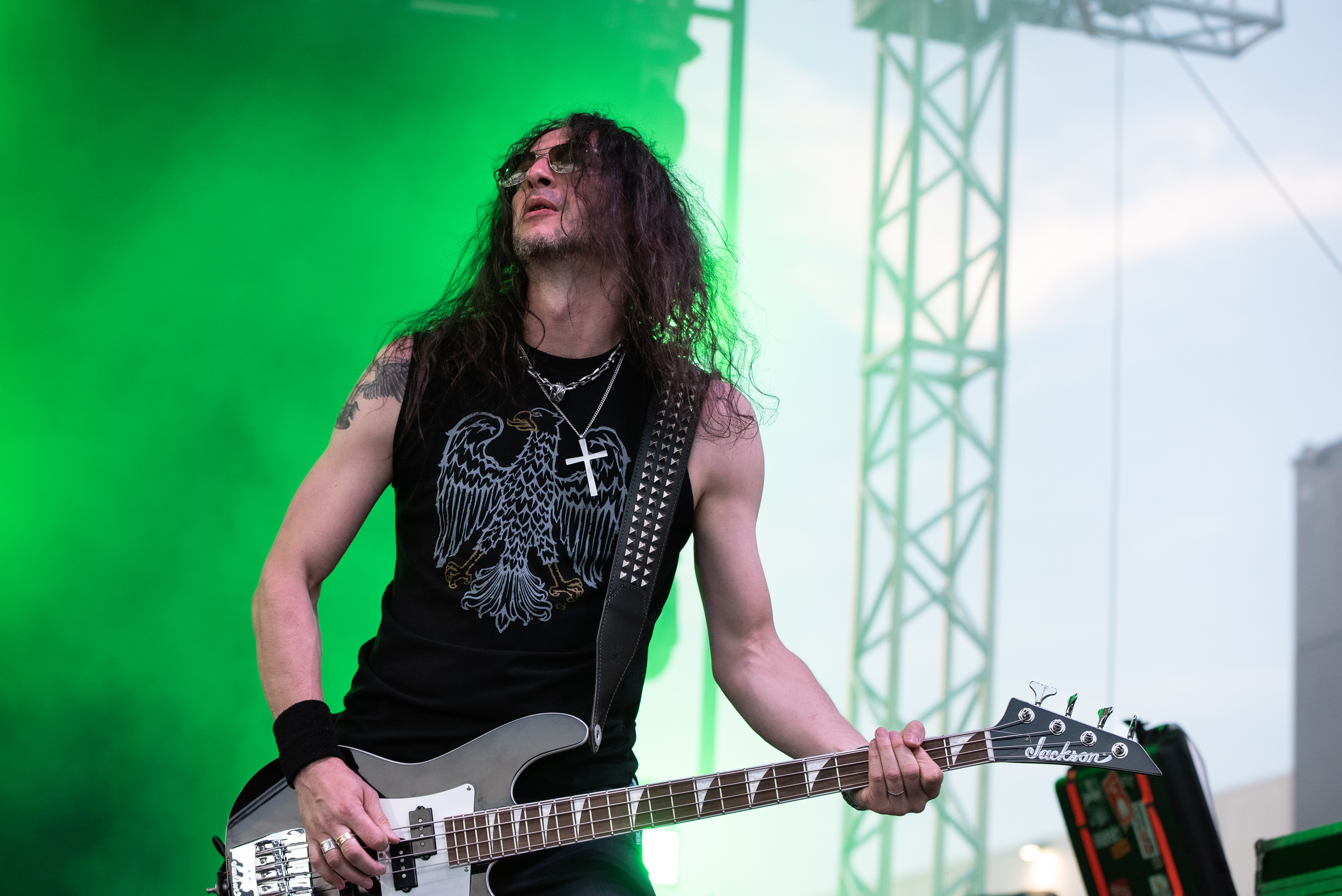
Francesco Zof

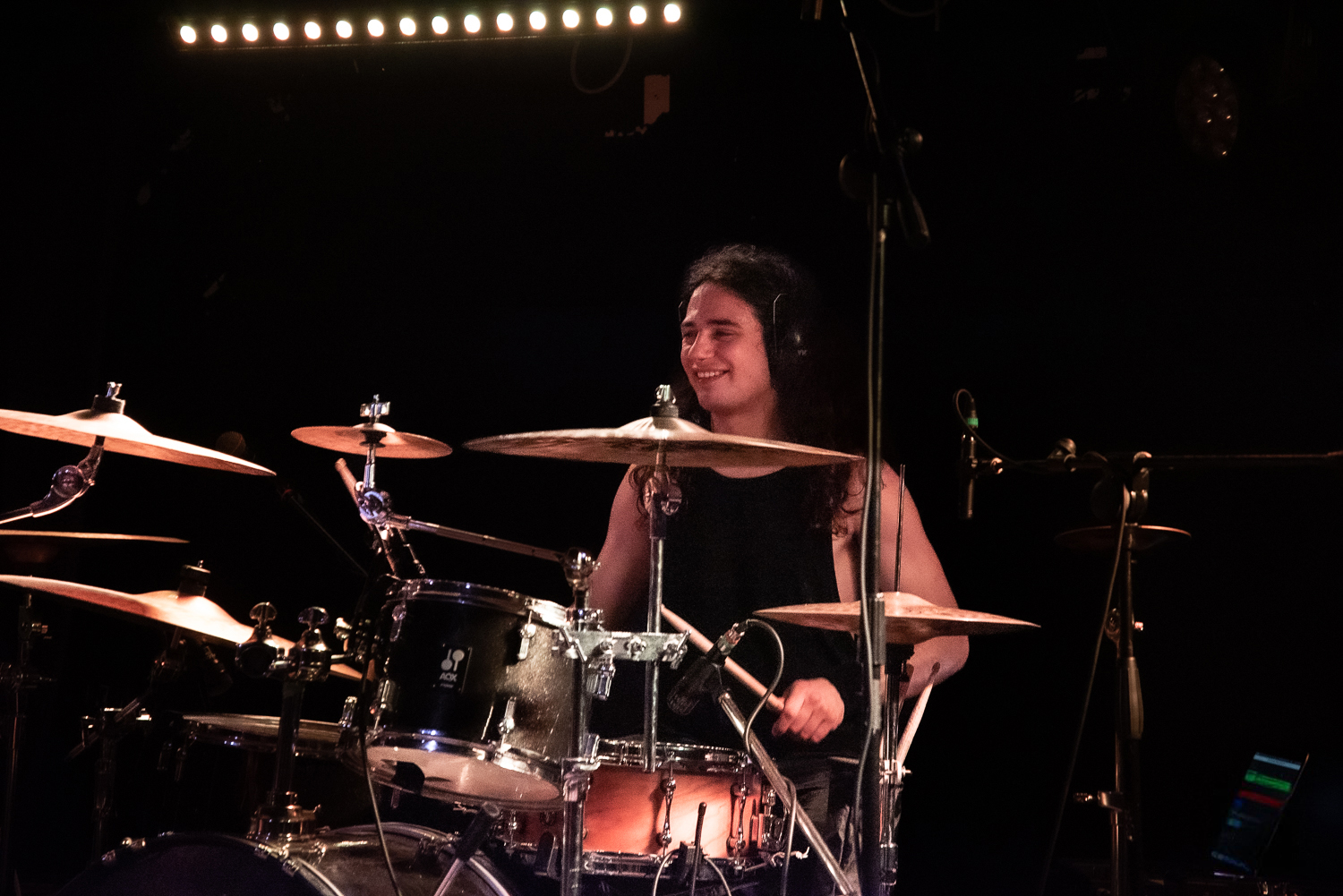
Niso Tomasini

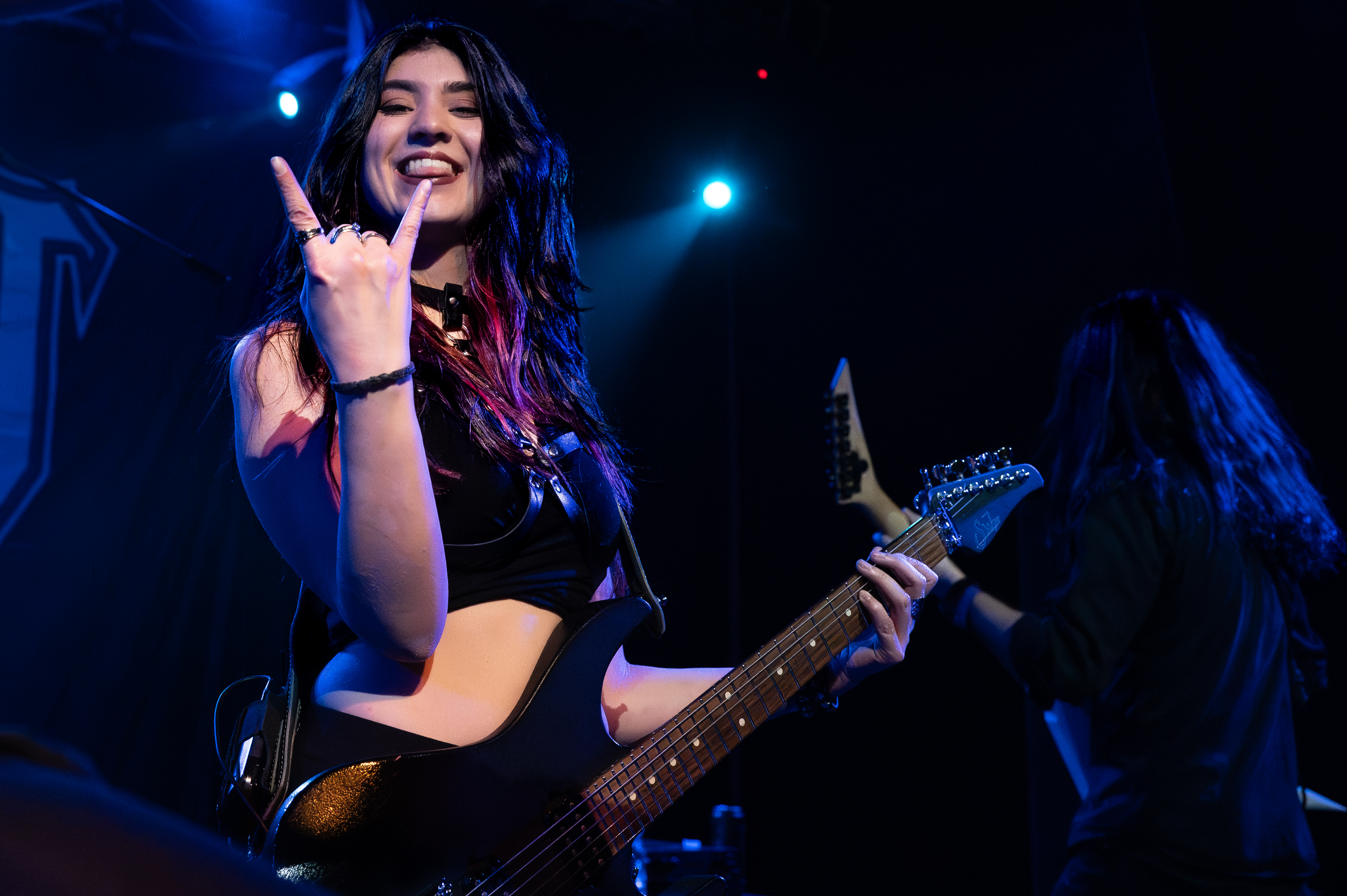
Alessia Lanzone

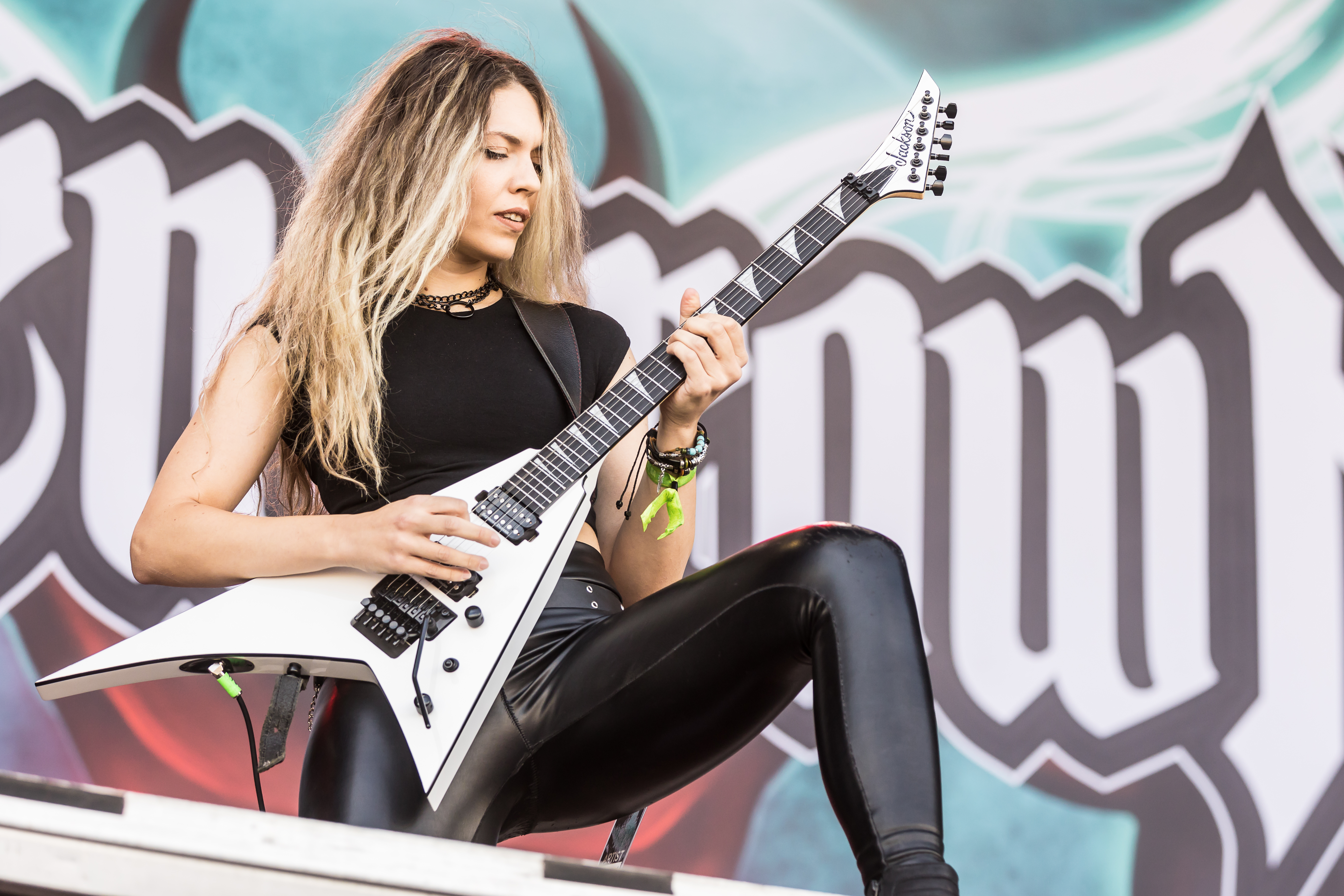
Alexandra Lioness

Current

- Giada "Jade" Etro – vocals (2017–present)
- Federico Mondelli – guitars, keyboards, vocals (2017–present)
- Francesco Zof – bass (2021–present)
- Niso Tomasini – drums (2021–present)
- Alessia Lanzone – guitars (2023–present)
- Alexandra Lioness – guitars (2025–present)

Former

- Thalia Bellazecca – guitars (2017–2020)
- Filippo Zavattari – bass (2017–2020)
- Alberto Mezzanotte – drums (2017–2020)
- Fabiola "Sheena" Bellomo – guitars (2021–2025)

Timeline

== Discography ==
=== Studio albums ===
- The Fallen King (2018)
- Crowned in Frost (2019)
- Winterbane (2021)
- Call of the North (2023)
- War Hearts (2024)
- The Legend of the Six Kings (2026)
