= Nocturna (band) =

Italian power metal band

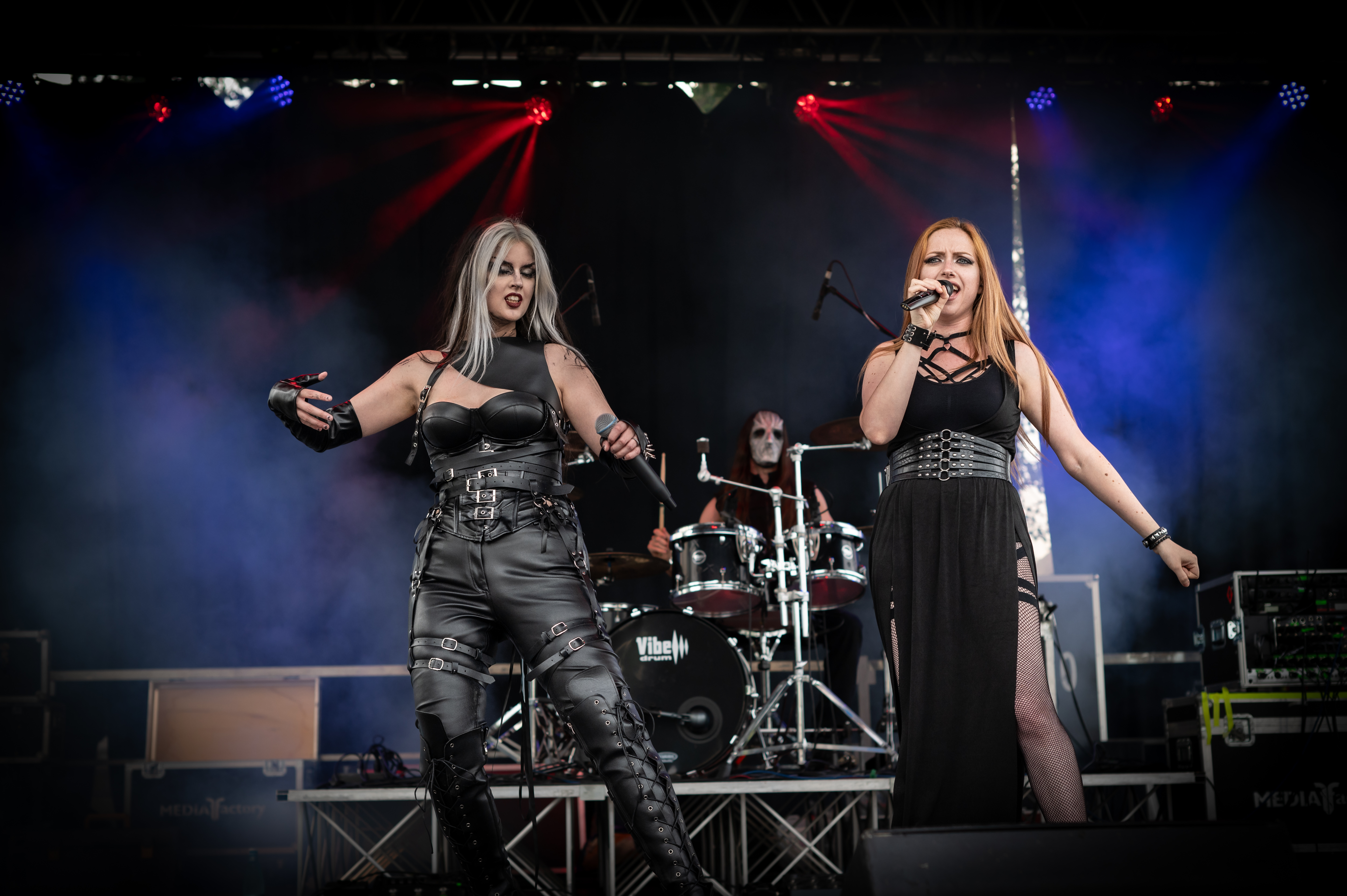
- Nocturna performing in 2024

Background information
- Origin: Italy
- Genres: Power metal, symphonic metal, gothic metal
- Years active: 2021–present
- Label: Scarlet Records
- Members: Rehn Stillnight; Antares; Deimos; Hedon

Nocturna is an Italian symphonic power metal band, founded in 2021 by Grace Darkling, Rehn Stillnight and Federico Mondelli. They have released two studio albums, Daughters of the Night and Of Sorcery and Darkness. Production of the former was affected by the COVID-19 lockdowns in Italy. The band's sound has been compared to that of Nightwish and Frozen Crown.

== History ==
Grace Darkling and Rehn Stillnight, both former frontwomen of StarWards who left after conflicting with other members, met Frozen Crown's Federico Mondelli in 2021 and started a band with him. The initial demos were all home-recorded as a result of the COVID-19 lockdowns in Italy. All other communications between the band members took place remotely, and the full band only met in person at the studio when recording the first album. The other members of the band wear face-concealing masks and use stage names. In 2021, they signed a deal for several albums with Scarlet Records, with whom Frozen Crown was already signed, and both later mounted a joint concert. Their first single, "New Evil", was released in October 2021 and received more than a million views in a couple of months. Its corresponding video clip was directed by Mondelli, who subsequently directed others. "New Evil" was followed by the album Daughters of the Night, which was named after two characters described in the lyrics to "New Evil." The album was recorded, mixed and mastered by Andrea Fusini at Fusix Studio, with artwork by Rehn Stillnight.

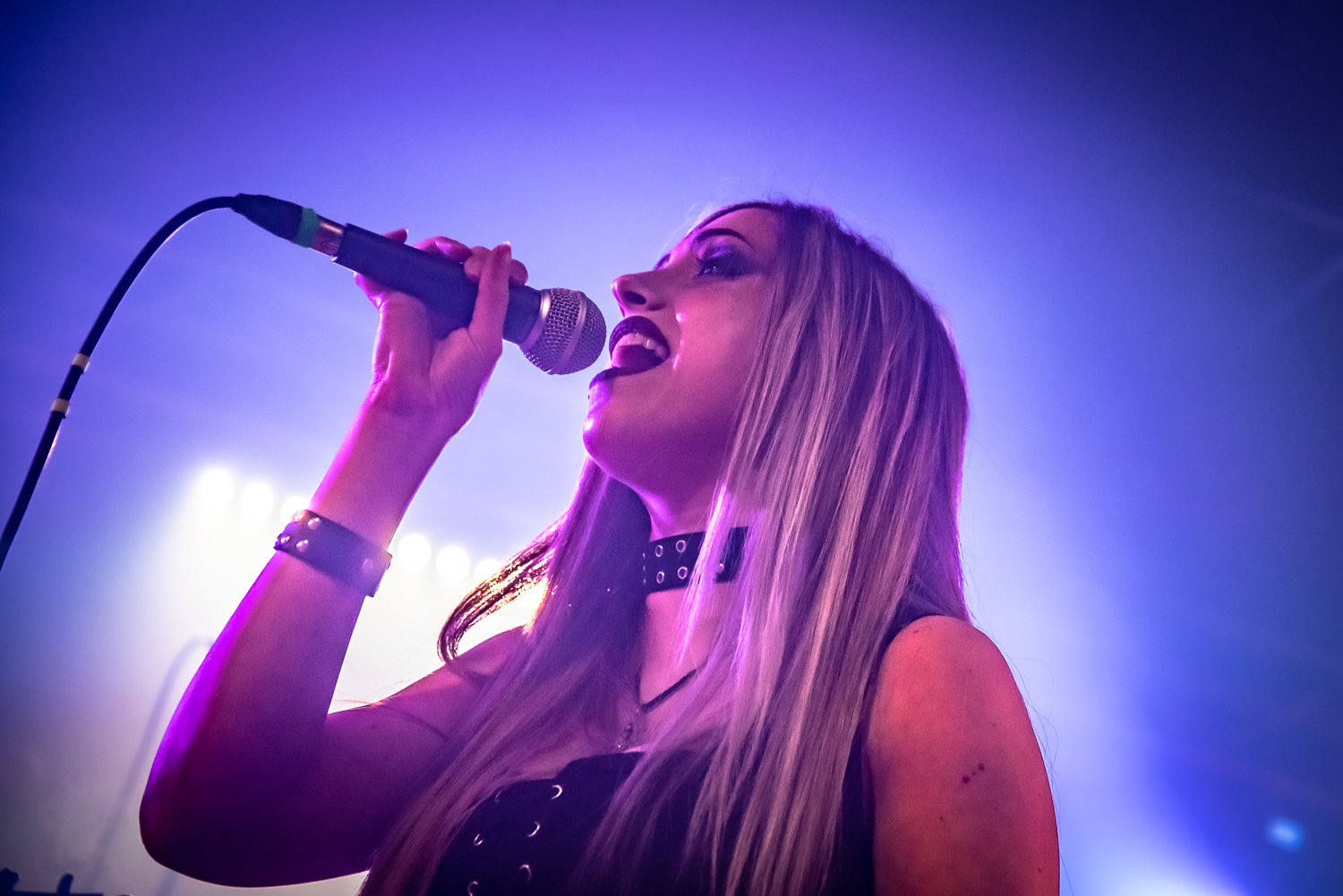
Performing in 2023

By the end of 2022, they had performed at the Scarlet Records Fest at the Legend Club in Milan. In February 2023, they mounted a concert in Bergamo with Hellfox and Deathless Legacy, which they followed the month after with an acoustic concert, at which Frozen Crown released its album Call of the North and Nocturna played "In the Dark", "Across the Sea", "Forever", and a cover of Helloween's "I Want Out". Darkling later provided guest vocals for the song "I^{3}" by Reasons Behind, from their 2023 album "Architecture of an Ego".

The band released the single "Seven Sins" in February 2024. It was released ahead of their second album, Of Sorcery and Darkness, which they released on 19 April on Scarlet Records. The production of the album was focused on the voices of Darkling and Stillnight to make them clearly distinguishable. The album was recorded and mixed by Andrea Fusini at Fusix Studio. Rehn Stillnight made the artwork and illustrations. The fourth single of the album is "Creatures of Darkness. In the following tours they closed the Strigarium festival alongside death metal band Ulvedharr.

Grace Darkling announced her departure from the band in June of 2026, citing the desire to focus on personal projects.

== Reception ==
Checo Mejia from The Dark Melody likened the band's sound to that of Nightwish and Frozen Crown, Darkling's voice to that of Frozen Crown's Giada Etro, and Stillnight's voice to that of Tarja Turunen. The band's song "Sapphire" was influenced by Nightwish and Savatage.

== Band members ==
- Rehn Stillnight (Serena Zaffaroni) – vocals
- Antares – bass
- Deimos – drums
- Hedon (Federico Mondelli) – guitars

== Discography ==
Studio albums:

- Daughters of the Night (2022)
- Of Sorcery and Darkness (2024)

== See also ==
- List of sopranos in non-classical music
