= Confusional Quartet =

Italian new wave band

Confusional Quartet is an Italian new wave band, which was active from 1978 to 1982, and then again after reforming in 2011 until present.

== History ==
Confusional Quartet formed in 1978, playing a mixture of instrumental, avant-garde, experimental rock. They released several records on vinyl, including the single "Volare", a futurist, instrumental cover of the song "Nel blu, dipinto di blu" by Domenico Modugno, a self-titled LP, a mini LP and a limited edition of flexidiscs. They have also appeared on various compilations, and their original records have been reissued on CD.

Confusional Quartet were invited to some contemporary art events, such as the IV Settimana internazionale della Performance in Bologna in 1980, and Universität für angewandte Kunst Festival in Vienna in 1981. In 1982 they stopped their activity, until the band reformed in 2011 with the four original members (Lucio Ardito on bass, Marco Bertoni on keyboards, Gianni Cuoghi on drums, and Enrico Serotti on guitar).

In 2012 two new albums were released, Italia calibro X and another self-titled album, Confusional Quartet. The single "Futurfunk" was cowritten with Bob Rifo of The Bloody Beetroots. In 2013, drummer Gianni Cuoghi left the band and was replaced by Claudio Trotta. In 2014 the band published Confusional Quartet play Demetrio Stratos, an album made using previously unreleased material from vocalist Demetrio Stratos.

== Discography ==
- Volare/Nedbo Zip (7", Italian Records 1980)
- Confusional Quartet (LP, Italian Records 1980)
- Confusional Quartet (EP 10", Italian Records 1981)
- Documentario (3xFlexi 7", Italian Records 1981)
- Mission Is Terminated - Nice Tracks (2LP, AAVV, Nice Label 1982)
- Confusional Quartet - reissue (CD - Elica 1999)
- Confuzed Disco Sampler 1 (remix by Scuola Furano) (LP, AAVV, Mantra Vibes 2005)
- Made in Italy 1978-1982 (CD, Astroman 2010)
- Italia Calibro X (CD, Ansaldi Records 2011)
- Music? No Control! (CD, AAVV, Sfera Cubica 2012)
- Confusional Quartet (CD-LP, Hell Yeah Recordings 2012)
- Italia No!-Contaminazioni No Wave italiane 1980-1985 (CD-LP, AAVV, Spittle Records)
- Italian Records-The Singles 7" Collection 1980-1984 (CD Box Set, AAVV, Spittle-Goodfellas 2013)
- Confusional Quartet play Demetrio Stratos (CD-LP, Expanded Music-Goodfellas 2014)
