= Lutharo =

Canadian melodic death metal band

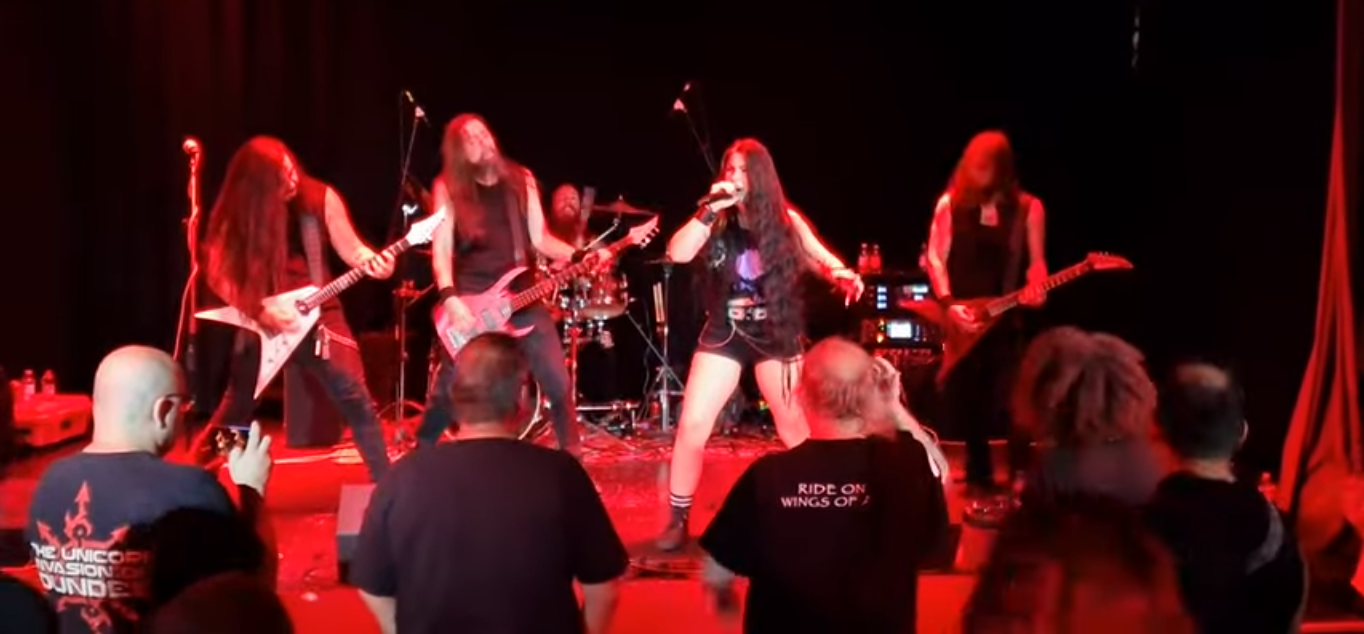
- Lutharo live in concert, 2022

Background information
- Also known as: Incarnadine (2012–2014)
- Origin: Hamilton, Ontario, Canada
- Genres: Melodic death metal; power metal
- Years active: 2014–present
- Label: RPM
- Members: Victor Bucur; Chris Pacey
- Past members: Mike Mores; Zac Almas; Paige McAleney; Kenny Twigg; John Raposo; Ruslan "Rusty" Lypovsky; Duval Gabraiel; Krista Shipperbottom; Cory Hofing
- Website: https://lutharo.com/

Lutharo is a Canadian melodic death metal band formed in 2014 in Hamilton, Ontario, Canada. The band was founded by guitarist Victor Bucur, who later recruited lead vocalist Krista Shipperbottom.

Since their formation, Lutharo have released two studio albums, and three EPs. They have also toured with Striker, Unleash the Archers, Alestorm, Raven and Frozen Crown.

== Musical style and influences ==
Lutharo has been described as a blend between melodic death metal and power metal, while also including elements of thrash metal, folk metal, and symphonic metal.

The band's influences include Arch Enemy, Unleash the Archers, Judas Priest, Metallica, Dimmu Borgir, Epica, Iron Maiden, Ensiferum, Dark Tranquillity, Destiny's Child, and Heart.

== Band members ==
=== Current ===
- Victor Bucur – lead guitar, backing vocals (2014–present)
- Chris Pacey – bass (2018–present)

=== Former ===
- Zac Almas – drums (2014–2015)
- Kenny Twigg – guitars (2014–2015)
- Mike Mores – bass, backing vocals (2014–2018)
- Paige McAleney – drums (2014–2018)
- John Raposo – guitars (2015–2022)
- Ruslan "Rusty" Lypovsky – bass (2018), drums (2018–2019)
- Duval Gabraiel – drums (2019–2021)
- Krista Shipperbottom – lead vocals (2014–2025)
- Cory Hofing – drums (2018, 2021–2025; live 2018–2019)

=== Touring ===
- Cale Costello – drums (2022, 2025)
- Alex Snape – guitars (2023), drums (2025)
- Jeff Wilson – guitars (2023–present)
- Kayla Dixon – lead vocals (2025)

== Discography ==
Studio albums:

- Hiraeth (2021)
- Chasing Euphoria (2024)

EPs:

- Incarnadine (2015)
- Unleash the Beast (2018)
- Wings of Agony (2020)

List of singles
| Year | Name | Album/EP |
|---|---|---|
| 2018 | "Unleash the Beast" | Unleash the Beast |
| 2020 | "Barren" | Wings of Agony |
| 2020 | "Blood Lightning" | Wings of Agony |
| 2021 | "Lost in a Soul" | Hiraeth |
| 2021 | "To Kill or to Crave" | Hiraeth |
| 2021 | "Hopeless Abandonment" | Hiraeth |
| 2023 | "Ruthless Bloodline" | Chasing Euphoria |
| 2023 | "Born to Ride" | Chasing Euphoria |
| 2023 | "Time to Rise" | Chasing Euphoria |
| 2024 | "Reaper's Call" | Chasing Euphoria |
| 2024 | "Creating a King" | Chasing Euphoria |
