= Tele Venezia =

Televenezia
- Country: Italy
- Broadcast area: Northern Italy

Programming
- Language(s): Italian
- Picture format: 4:3 SDTV

Ownership
- Owner: TeleVenezia SRL

History
- Launched: 1977

Links
- Website: http://www.televenezia.it/it/

Availability

Terrestrial
- Digital: LCN 19

Televenezia is an Italian regional television channel of Veneto owned by TeleVenezia SRL group. It transmits a light entertainment program: movies, news and weather bulletins, documentary film and sports on LCN 19.

Other channels of own group are Televenezia Tg and Televenezia Cinema.

== Programs in Italian ==
- TG Regione
- TG Venezia
- Laurel and Hardy
- Tenta la Fortuna
- Radio Venezia
- Notizie dai Veneti per i Veneti
- Almanacco Meteo (Meteorology)
- Almanacco Maree (Acqua alta)
- Superpass
- Bikers Explorer
- Agrisapori
- Ultimo Km (Cycling)
- Animated series
- Casanova
- Oggi le Comiche (comic)
- A scuola di cucina

== Staff ==
- Giovanni Vindigni (owner)
- Maria Stella Donà
- Alberto Chinellato
