= Herman Medrano =

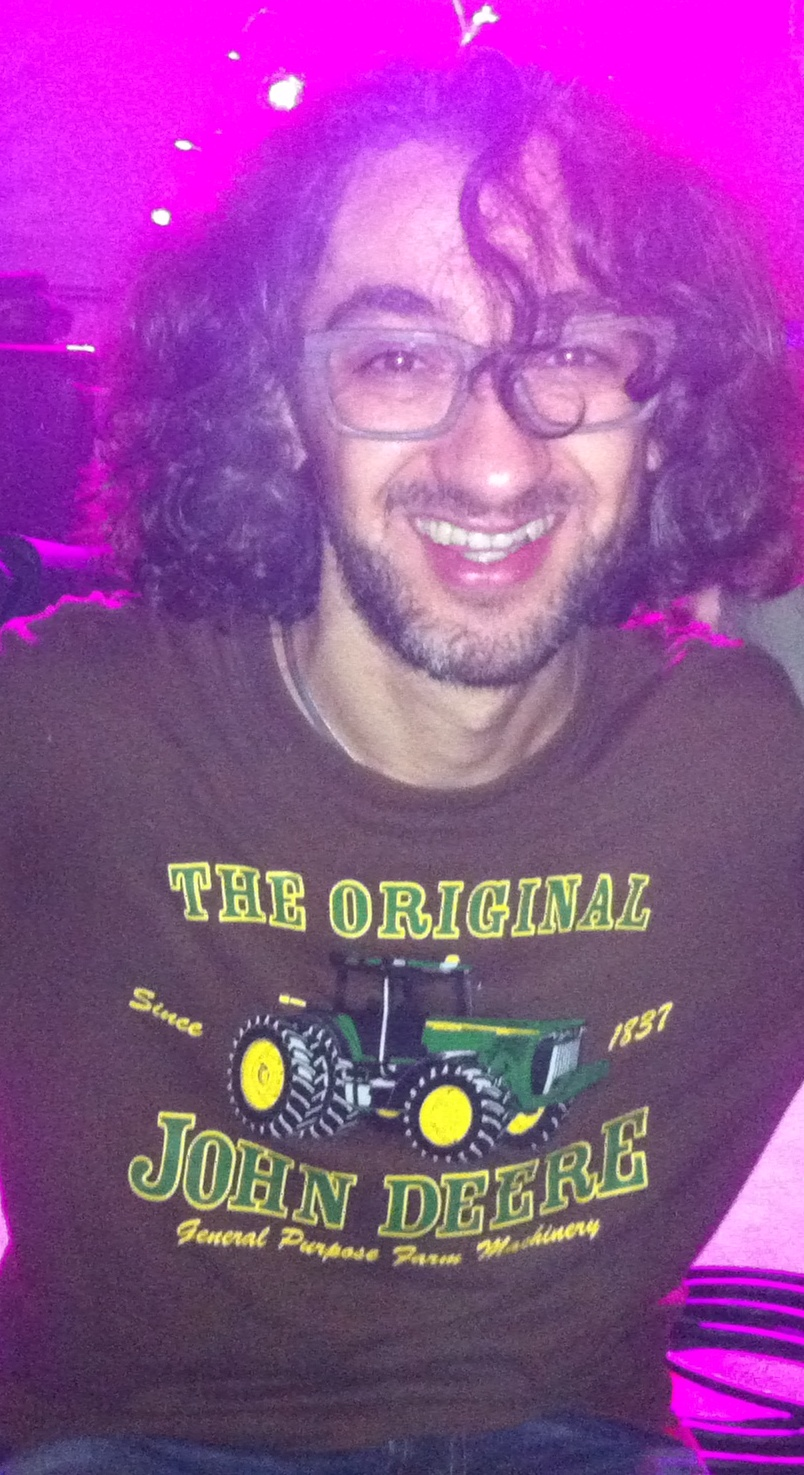

Background information
- Also known as: Uno
- Born: Ermanno Menegazzo; 8 January 1972 (age 53)
- Origin: Dolo, Veneto, Italy
- Genres: Rap
- Years active: 1993—present
- Website: www.medrano.biz

Ermanno Menegazzo (born 8 January 1972), known by his stage name Herman Medrano, is an Italian rapper. He has collaborated with Caparezza, Piotta and Roy Paci.

== Career ==
Menegazzo began his career as Uno. In 1993, he published his first album Connessione mente-voce, and in 1997 released his second album ABC.

In 1998, Menegazzo changed his stage name to Herman Medrano and in 2001 published 160x50. Between 2003 and 2009 he released four albums: Fisso e tacchente (2003), Mediamente mona (2005), Tento co e paroe (2007) and Te toca ti (2009).

During 2012, Menegazzo collaborated with Italian band The Groovy Monkeys to release their first live album, Simie - Double cd live. In 2013, Noseconossemo was released, which saw Menegazzo collaborating with other Italian artists including Caparezza, Piotta and Roy Paci.

== Discography ==
- Connessione mente-voce (1993; as Uno)
- ABC (1997; as Uno & Dj Shocca)
- 160x50 (2001)
- Fisso e tacchente (2003)
- Mediamente mona (2005)
- Tento co e paroe (2007)
- Te toca ti (2009)
- Simie - Double cd live (2012; as Herman Medrano & The Groovy Monkeys)
- Noseconossemo (2013; as Herman Medrano & The Groovy Monkeys)
