= Nanowar of Steel =

Italian parody power metal band

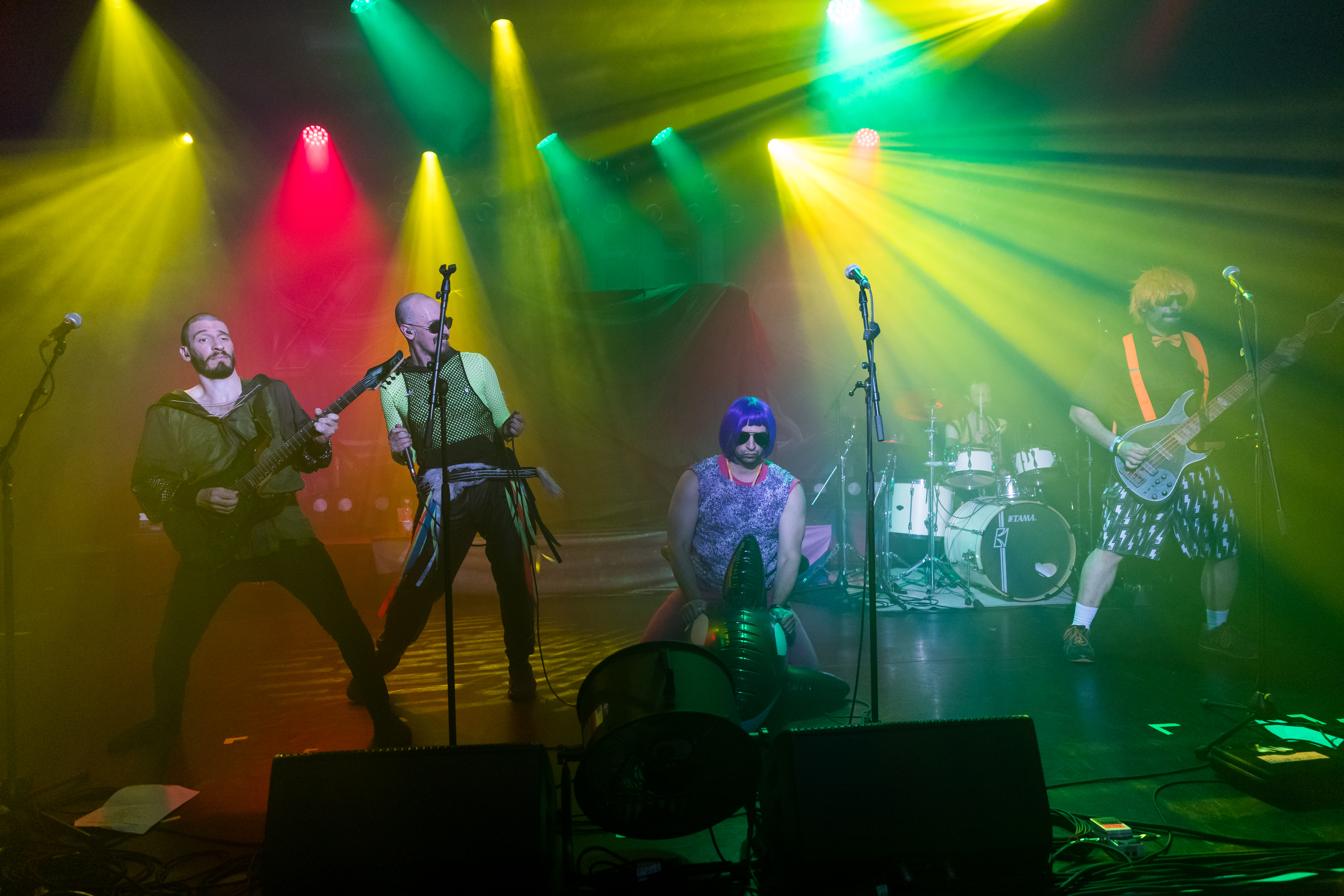
- Nanowar of Steel in 2024

Background information
- Also known as: Nanowar (2003–2006)
- Origin: Italy
- Genres: Power metal
- Years active: 2003–present
- Members: Mohammed Abdul; Gattopanceri666; Uinona Raider; Potowotominimak; Mr. Baffo
- Website: Official Nanowar Website

Nanowar of Steel (stylised as NanowaR of Steel by the band) is an Italian power metal band. Their name is a pun on the metal bands Manowar and Rhapsody of Fire, and represents their tendency to satirize "true metal", the primary focus of their music. Their work mainly aims to make humorous references to and jokes about the genre, often parodying the way in which power metal bands are perceived to take themselves very seriously.

In 2006, the band changed their name from Nanowar to Nanowar of Steel, as a parody of the Italian power metal band Rhapsody changing their name to Rhapsody of Fire after a legal dispute. On their logo, the "of Steel" part was made to look like it was quickly and carelessly scribbled behind the main name as an afterthought.

== History ==
The 2005 album Other Bands Play, Nanowar Gay! was published on Jamendo under the Creative Commons-BY-NC-SA licence. The 2010 album Into Gay Pride Ride was published on the same platform under the Creative Commons-BY licence.

In April 2012, they released the videoclip for a new single entitled Giorgio Mastrota, which reached over 100,000 views on YouTube in just two weeks (currently over three and a half million). The song became extremely popular in Italy, being broadcast by several radio stations and also appearing on national television on several occasions. In 2013 they started cooperating with Feudalesimo e Liberta’, a well known Italian pseudo-parody political movement which advocates the return of the Empire and Feudal Rights in Europe. They released a music video in August of the same year, which was covered by mainstream newspapers (such as La Repubblica).

In July 2019, they released the song Norwegian Reggaeton. The video received 800,000 views on YouTube within the first 5 days, and 2.8 million views within the first month and is currently (December 2025) at over 16 million views. The song combines heavy metal and reggaeton and includes the collaboration of Charly Glamour, the singer/frontman of the similarly themed parody heavy metal Spanish band Gigatron (band). The group performed Norwegian Reggaeton at Spanish television show Got Talent España; two of the four judges said "no", one of them before the band even started playing, after hearing the words "metal" and "reggaeton". Later the band announced their intention to represent Spain in the Eurovision Song Contest.

In October 2019, they signed their first professional contract with Napalm Records.

In December 2019, they released the song Valhallelujah, a Christmas song combining heavy metal and gospel, dedicated to Odin and IKEA. Angus McFife (Thomas Winkler) of Gloryhammer plays the part of Odin.

In May 2020, they released Sneeztem of a Yawn, a song about their lives during the COVID-19 pandemic in South Italy, with scrambled lyrics.

In early 2021, they announced a new album Italian Folk Metal, which was released on 2 July 2021. As the name suggests, the album combines folk music with metal music. Also, while they have released songs in Italian before, this is their first full-length album in the Italian language. The name of the album was likely inspired by the Indian heavy metal band Bloodywood, who often describe their music as "Indian folk metal".

In March 2023, the album Dislike to False Metal was released, preceded by the singles Winterstorm in the Night and Disco Metal.

In October–November 2023, they toured across North America with DragonForce, Amaranthe, and Edge of Paradise.

In December 2024, the album XX Years of Steel was released, a recording of their live performance at Alcatraz, Milano in October 2023, along with additional nine studio recordings. One song (Helloworld.java) was a song in the programming language Java.

In February–March 2025, they toured across Europe with Dynazty.

On 7 January 2026, the band released a new EP, The Genghis Khan EP to End All Genghis Khan EPs.

== Band members ==
Nanowar of Steel, Line-Up at Rockharz Open Air 2018

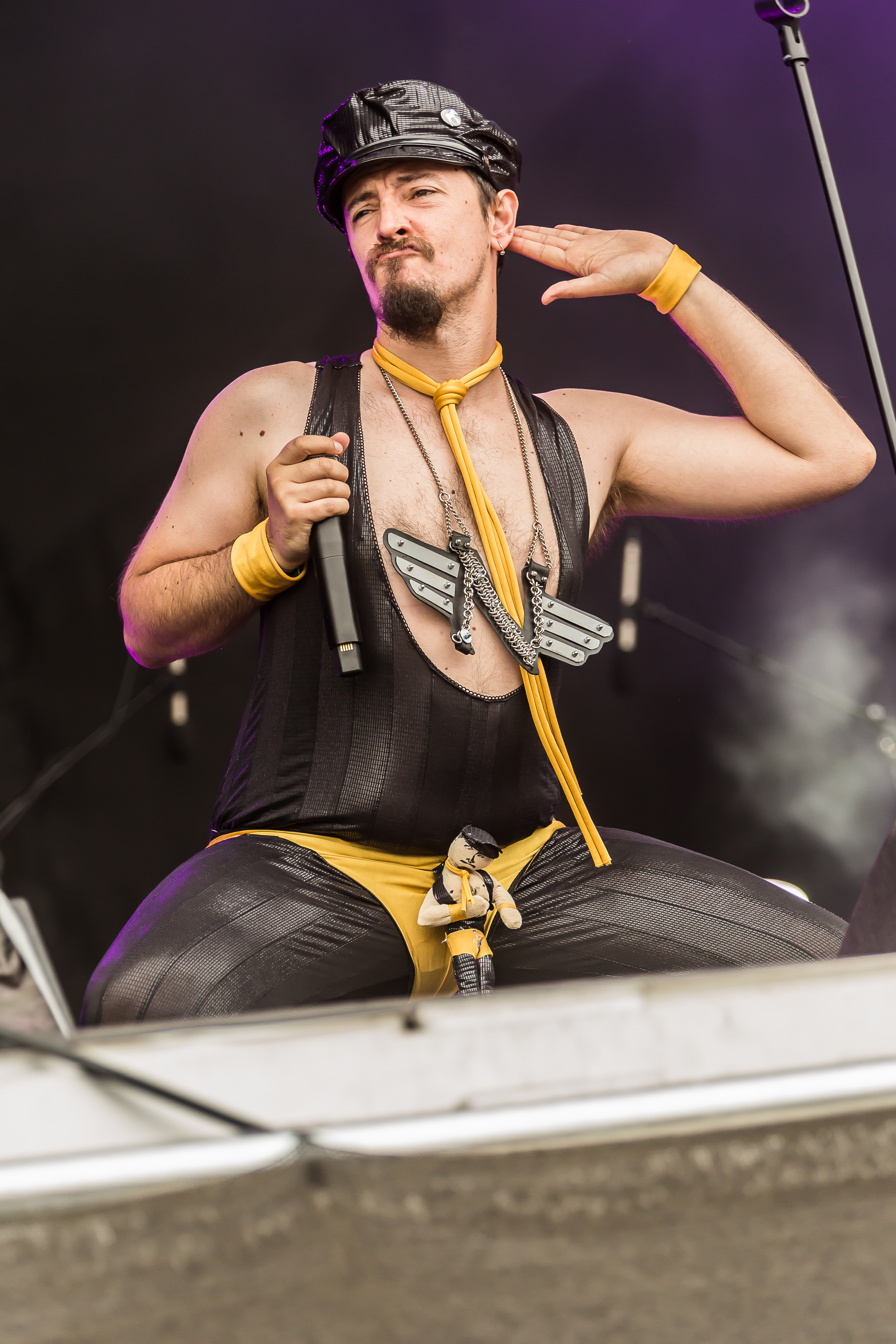
Singer Potowotominimak

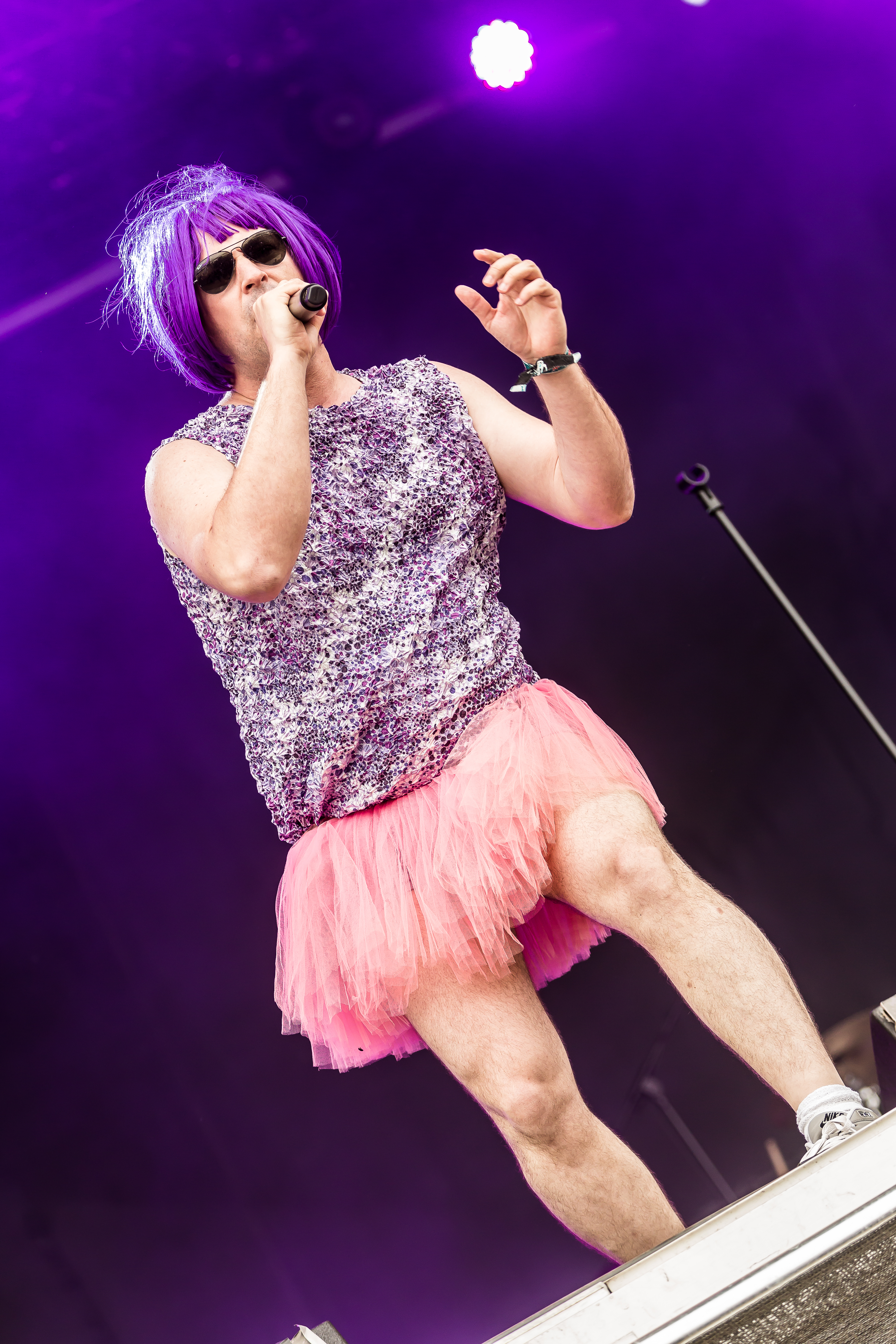
Sound Effects Mr. Baffo

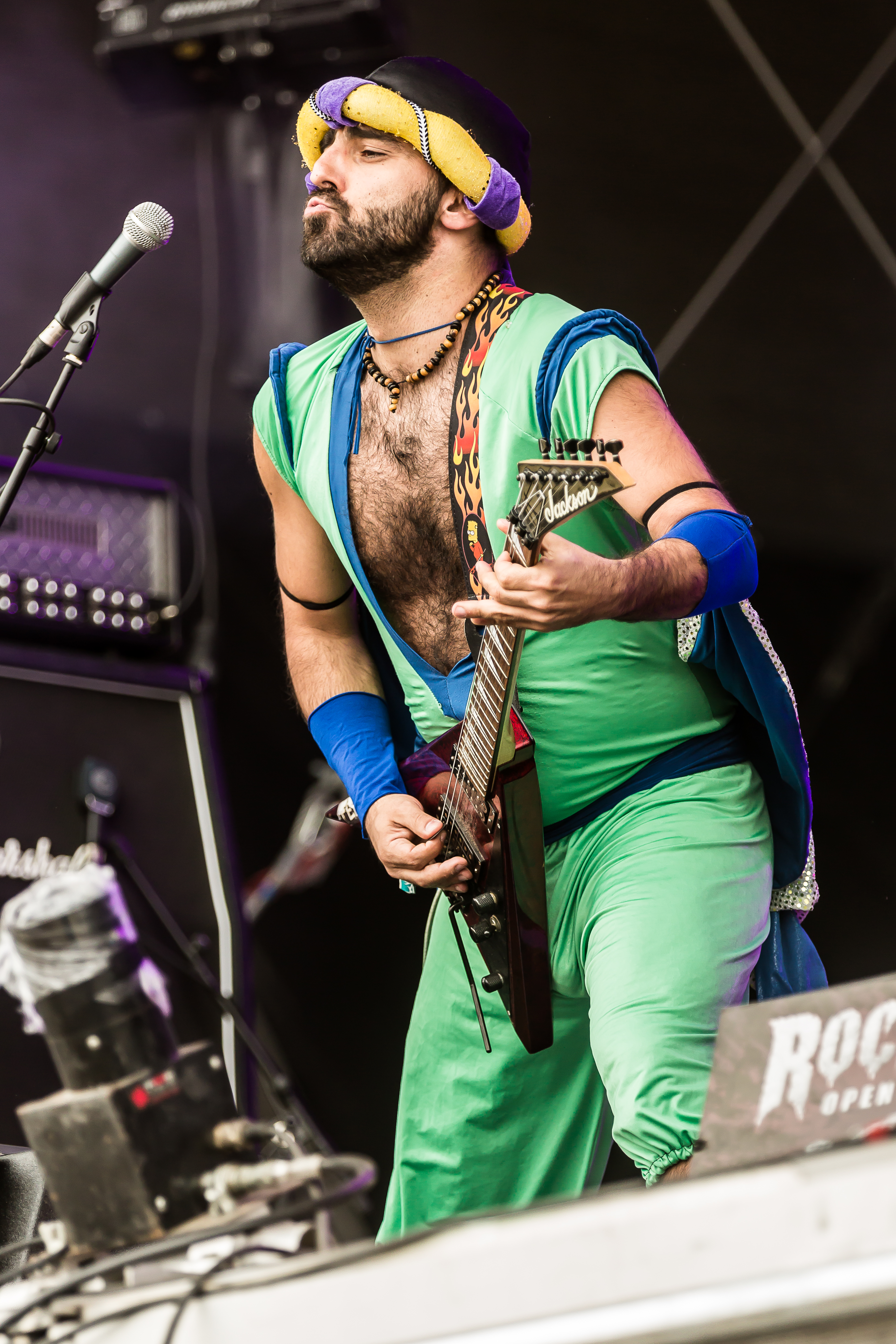
Guitarist Mohammed Abdul

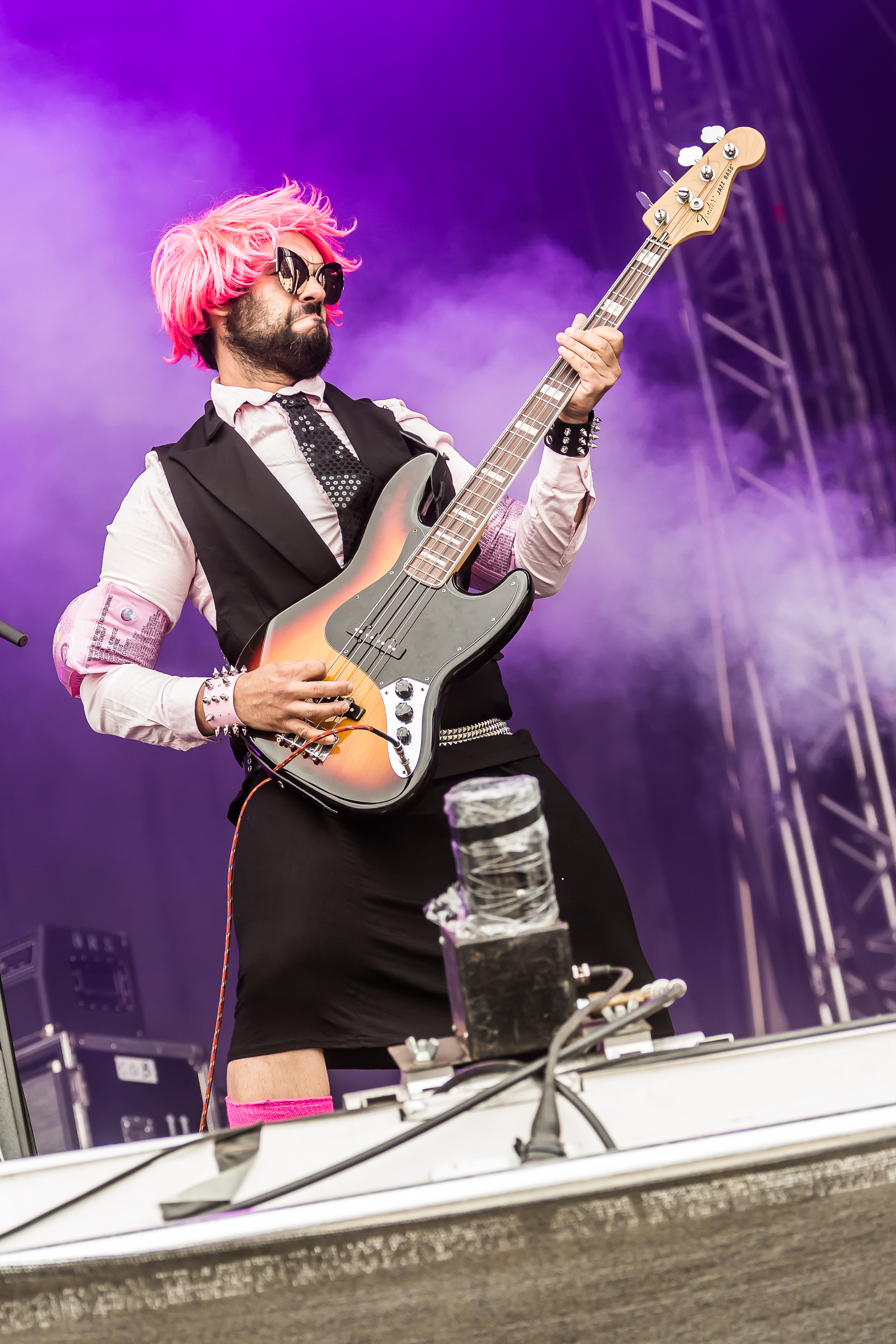
Bassist Gattopanceri666

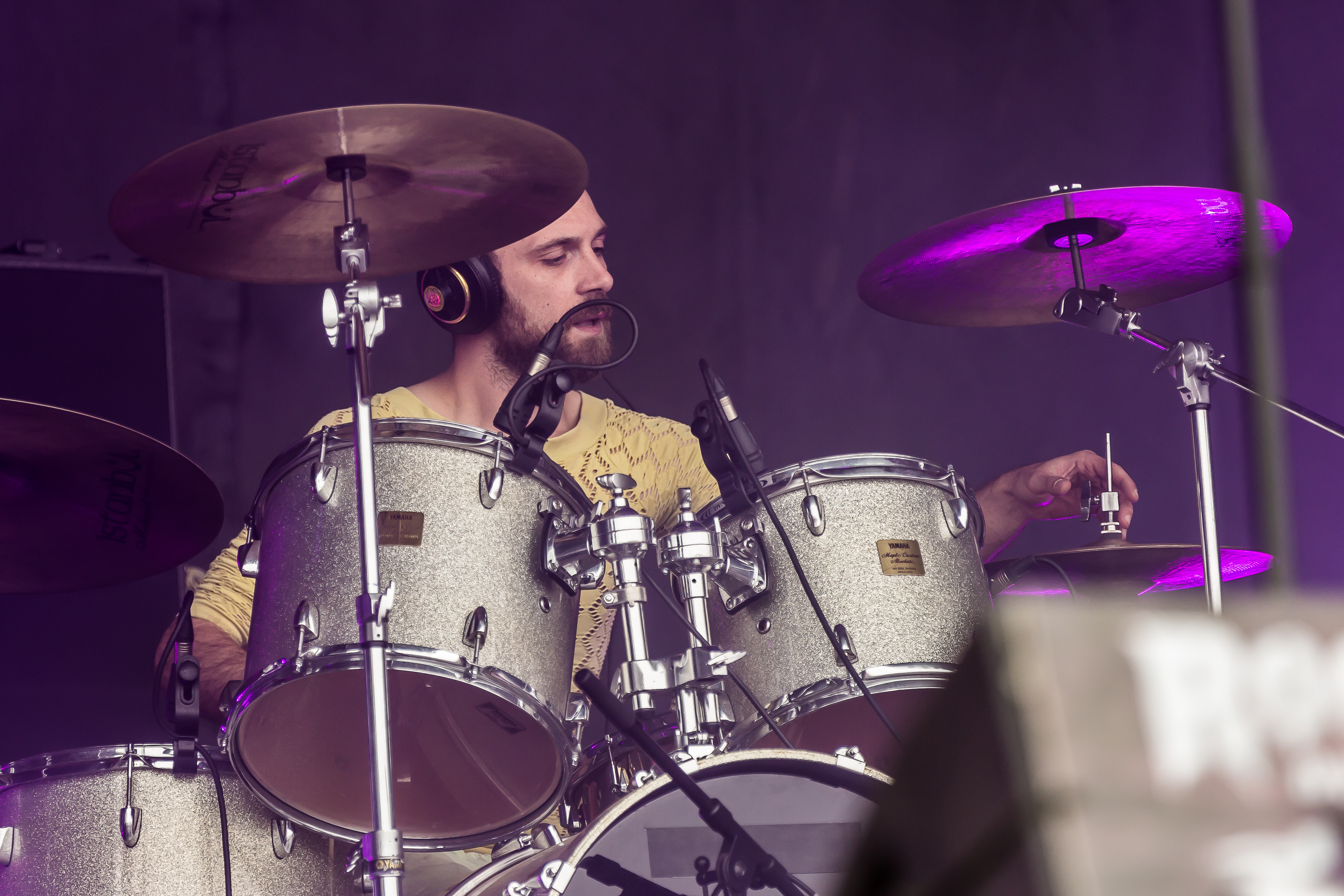
Drummer Uinona Raider
- Potowotominimak (Carlo Alberto Fiaschi) - lead vocals
- Mr. Baffo (Raffaello Venditti) - co-lead vocals, miscellaneous sound effects
- Mohammed Abdul (Valerio Storch) - guitars, keyboards, backing vocals
- Gattopanceri666 (Edoardo Carlesi) - bass, backing vocals
- Uinona Raider (Alessandro Milone) - drums

== Discography ==
=== Studio albums ===
Title	Album details
Triumph of True Metal of Steel	Released: July 2003; Label: none (self-produced)
Other Bands Play, Nanowar Gay!	Released: June 2005; Label: none (self-produced)
Into Gay Pride Ride	Released: 2010; Label: none (self-produced)
A Knight at the Opera	Released: 2014 (album and DVD); Label: none (self-produced)
Stairway to Valhalla	Released: November 2018/2020; Label: Audioglobe (2018 edition)/Napalm Records (2020 reprint with Bonus CD)
Italian Folk Metal	Released: July 2021; Label: Napalm Records
Dislike to False Metal	Released: 10 March 2023; Label: Napalm Records

=== Compilation albums ===
Title	Album details
Promotional Compilation 2007	Released: 2007; Label: none (self-produced)

=== Live albums ===
Title	Album details
Made in Naples	Released: January 2007 (Limited Edition Double CD); Label: none (self-produced)
XX Years of Steel	Released: 6 December 2024; Label: Napalm Records

=== Extended plays ===
Title	Album details
True Metal of the World	Released: 2003 (demo); Label: none (self-produced)
Tour-Mentone Vol.1	Released: January 2016; Label: none (self-produced)
The Genghis Khan EP to End All Genghis Khan EPs	Released: 7 January 2026; Label: Napalm Records

=== Singles ===
Title	Date	Label	Album
"Metal La La La"	2009	Self Released	Other Bands Play, Nanowar Gay
"Giorgio Mastrota (The Keeper of Inox Steel)"	2012	Self Released	A Knight At The Opera
"Nanowar"	2012	Self Released	Into Gay Pride Ride
"RAP-sody" (Rhapsody of Fire Parody)	2012	Self Released	Into Gay Pride Ride
"I'm Heavy" (Happy Parody)	2014	Self Released	Non-album single
"Bestie di Seitan"	2017	Self Released	Non-album single
"The Call Of Cthulhu"	2018	Self Released	Stairway To Valhalla
"Heavy Metal Kibbles"	2018	Self Released	Stairway To Valhalla
"Barbie MILF Princess Of The Twilight" (feat. Fabio Lione)	2018	Self Released	Stairway To Valhalla
"Vegan Velociraptor"	2019	Self Released	Stairway To Valhalla
"And Then I Noticed That She Was A Gargoyle"	2019	Self Released	Stairway To Valhalla
"Norwegian Reggaeton"	2019	Self Released	Stairway To Valhalla (2020 reprint)
"Valhalleluja"	2019	Napalm Records	Stairway To Valhalla (2020 reprint)
"Sneeztem of a Yawn"	2020	Napalm Records	Stairway To Valhalla (2020 reprint)
"Uranus" (feat. Michael Starr)	2020	Napalm Records	Stairway to Valhalla
"In The Sky"	2020	Napalm Records	Stairway to Valhalla
"Formia"	2021	Napalm Records	Non-album single
"Biancodolce"	2021	Napalm Records	Non-album single
"La Maledizione di Capitan Findus/Der Fluch des Kapt’n Iglo"	2021	Napalm Records	Italian Folk Metal
"Gabonzo Robot"	2021	Napalm Records	Italian Folk Metal
"La Polenta Taragnarock" (feat. Giorgio Mastrota)	2021	Napalm Records	Italian Folk Metal
"Armpits of Immortals" (feat. Ross The Boss)	2022	Napalm Records	Non-album single
"Winterstorm in the Night" (feat. Madeleine Liljestam)	2023	Napalm Records	Dislike to False Metal
"Disco Metal"	2023	Napalm Records	Dislike to False Metal
"Pasadena 1994" (feat. Joakim Brodén)	2023	Napalm Records	Dislike to False Metal
"Afraid to shoot into the eyes of a stranger in a strange land"	2024	Napalm Records	Non-album single
IRIDE	2025	Napalm Records	Non-album single

=== Music videos ===
List of music videos, showing year released and directors
Title	Year	Director(s)
"Giorgio Mastrota (The Keeper of Inox Steel)"	2012	Christian Ice
"Nanowar"	2012	Xaria Byron
"RAP-sody"	2012	Christian Ice
"I'm Heavy"	2014	Christian Ice
"Bestie of Seitan"	2017	Christian Ice
"The Call of Cthulhu"	2018	Matteo Di Gioia
"Heavy Metal Kibbie"	2018	Christian Ice and Marco Dazzi
"Vegan Velociraptor"	2019	Christian Ice
"Ironmonger (The Copier of the Seven Keys)"	2019	Christian Ice
"And Then I Noticed That She Was a Gargoyle"	2019	Paolo Cellammare
"Norwegian Reggaeton"	2019	Paolo Cellammare
"Valhalleluja"	2019	Paolo Cellammare
"Sneeztem of a Yawn"	2020	Christian Ice
"Uranus"	2020	Paolo Cellammare
"In the Sky"	2020	Valerio Fea
"Formia"	2021	Valerio Fea
"Biancodolce"	2021	Valerio Fea
"La Maledizione di Capitan Findus"	2021	Paolo Cellammare
"Der Fluch des Kapt'n Iglo"	2021	Paolo Cellammare
"Gabonzo Robot"	2021	Dr. Pira
"La Polenta Taragnarok"	2021	Valerio Fea
"Armpits of Immortals"	2022	Valerio Fea
"Winterstorm in the Night"	2023	Valerio Fea
"Disco Metal"	2023	Valerio Fea
"Pasadena 1994"	2023	Valerio Fea
"Sober"	2023	Francesco Badalini
"Afraid to Shoot into the Eyes of a Stranger in a Strange Land"	2024	Francesco Badalini
"HelloWorld.java"	2024	Francesco Badalini
"Stormwarrior of the Storm"	2024	Gabriele Morzilli

== Awards and nominations ==
Award Ceremony	Year	Nominated work	Category	Result
Berlin Music Video Awards	2020	VALHALLELUJA	Most Trashy	Nominated

== See also ==
- Catarrhal Noise
- Massacration
