= Steve Vawamas =

Italian bassist

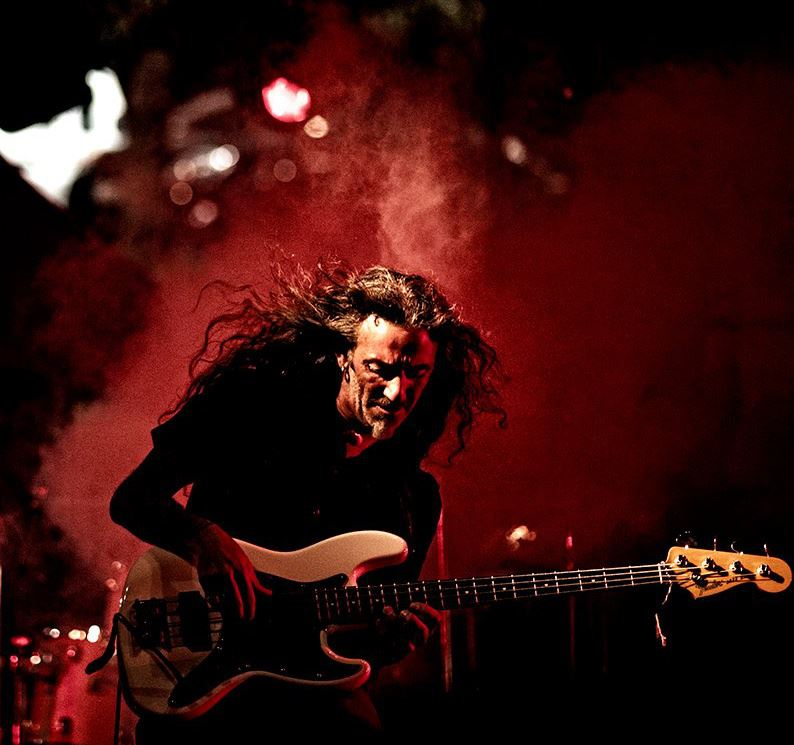

Background information
- Born: Italy
- Genres: Neoclassical metal, hard rock, heavy metal
- Occupations: Musician, songwriter
- Instrument: Bass
- Years active: 1997–present

Steve Vawamas is an Italian bassist, known for his collaborations with various metal bands such as Athlantis, Shadows of Steel, Mastercastle, and The Dogma.

== Biography ==
He started playing when he was 14 years old, following the example of famous hard rock and heavy metal bass players as Steve Harris. In 1997, Steve began his collaboration with the singer Wild Steel, who got him involved in his band Shadows of Steel: with them, he recorded 2 albums: Shadows of Steel and Twilight, published under the label Underground Symphony. Eventually, with Wild Steel, he started the project Prometeo, which had been temporarily interrupted.

In 2003, he played live with Glenn Hughes (Deep Purple) in Genova and, in the meantime, started to collaborate with various bands and different genres. Soon after, he started his own project, Athlantis: he recorded Athlantis (2003), Metalmorphosis (2008), and Metal Will Never Die (2012).

In 2006, he joined The Dogma and recorded in Germany the CD Black Roses, with Mike Terrana on drums (Masterplan, Sinfonica, Malmsteen, Macalpine, etc.).

In the following years, he was often asked to collaborate in the studio and live with artists as Tommy Talamanca (Sadist), Trevor (Sadist), Pino Scotto (Vanadium), Pier Gonella (Mastercastle, Necrodeath), and others.

In 2008, he was chosen to join Mastercastle with whom he recorded the albums The Phoenix (2009), Last Desire (2010), Dangerous Diamonds (2011), and On Fire (2013) under the label Lion Music, Enfer (2014) under the label Scarlet Records. In April of this same year, with this band, he participated with other international artists (including Jennifer Batten) in the project ‘Embrace the Sun’, a double album produced by Lion Music, for a donation to the Japanese Red Cross for the earthquake of March 11, 2011.

In 2012, he worked on his parallel project, Athlantis, signing a contract with the German Rock it Up, and the third album M.W.N.D. was released with Pier Gonella (Mastercastle-Necrodeath) on guitar, Enrico Sidoti on drums, and Jack Spider on vocals. This CD has other artists, such as Giorgia Gueglio (Mastercastle), Fausto Ciapica, Alessio Calandriello, and Gianfranco ‘Pino’ Puggioni, as special guests.

In 2011, he took part in the "MusicArt Project", a remake of the Pink Floyd album ‘The Dark Side of the Moon’ called ‘The Black Side of the Moon’, with Pier Gonella and Giorgia Gueglio (Mastercastle), Peso (Necrodeath), and Andrea Vulpani. In 2013, Mastercastle went on with his discography story, releasing the album "On Fire" with the famous drummer John Macaluso.

In the same year, two other projects were achieved: Tragedian, led by the German Gabriele Palermo, released by the label Rock it Up, and Shadows of Steel, released by the label Underground Symphony. Soon after, the fourth Athlantis CD was recorded and released in 2014 for the German label Rock it Up, including Pier Gonella and Gianfranco Puggioni on guitars, Francesco La Rosa on drums, Alessio Calandriello (Lucid Dreams) and Roberto Tiranti (Labyrinth, Steff Burns…) on vocals, and the German Carsten Shultz.

In 2015, he was part of Pier Gonella's Odyssea project, contributing to different tunes on the album Storm.

== Discography ==
- 1997: Shadows of Steel (with the band Shadows of Steel)
- 1998: Twilight (with the band Shadows of Steel)
- 2000: Heroes (with the band Shadows of Steel)
- 2002: Second Floor (with the band Shadows of Steel)
- 2003: Athlantis (with the band Athlantis)
- 2006: Black Roses (with the band The Dogma)
- 2008: Metalmorphosis (with the band Athlantis)
- 2009: The Phoenix (with the band Mastercastle)
- 2010: Last Desire (with the band Mastercastle)
- 2011: Dangerous Diamonds (with the band Mastercastle)
- 2012: M.W.N.D. (with the band Athlantis)
- 2012: The Black Side of the Moon (with the band MusicArt Project)
- 2013: On Fire (with the band Mastercastle)
- 2013: Decimation (with the band Tragedian)
- 2013: Crown Of Steel (with the band Shadows of Steel)
- 2014: Enfer (with the band Mastercastle)
- 2015: Storm (with the band Odyssea)
- 2016: Orion (with the band Bellathrix)
- 2016: Sun & Light (with the band Galleano and Friends)
- 2017: Wine of Heaven (with the band Mastercastle)
- 2022: Lighthouse Pathetic (with the band Mastercastle)
