= Odyssea (band) =

Italian metal power band

Odyssea is an Italian power metal band from Genoa.

The band was formed around guitarist Pier Gonella. He added vocalist Carlo Faraci and drummer Chris Parisi, with Steve Vawamas contributing on bass and guest vocals onn Odyssea's debut album being done by Roberto Tiranti on "Fly" and Wild Steel on "Angel Cries".

The debut album Tears in Floods was released in 2004 on Scarlet Records. Metal.de stated that Odyssea was quite similar to Labyrinth and was "not a contender for an innovation award". At the same time, the band managed to stand out via "a number of compositional gimmicks and catchy tunes", several atmospheric songs and avoidance of boring elements. The debut was not perfect, though, in part because of the unoriginal ballad "Try Again". The score thus became 7 out of 10. Rock Hard gave Tears in Floods a 6.5 out of 10 score. Danish site Heavymetal.dk scored the album 6 of 10. Pier Gonella did good lead guitar work and somee of the riffs were good, but "I find Carlo Faraci's vocals a smidge too boring and at times monotonous in the long run". The reviewer also appreciated the parts "where the keyboards don't devolve into synthetic rape". The same score, 3 of 5, was given by Finnish Noise.fi, whose reviewer stated that the songs were of equal quality, "skillfully rolled out from start to finish, although completely unsurprisingly".

Norway's Scream gave Tears in Floods 3 out of 6, calling the band a "Labyrinth clone" and the album "a poor attempt to counterfeit" Return to Heaven Denied. On the positive side, Pier Gonella was a good guitarist, but less successful as a songwriter in this case. Another Norwegian magazine only gave a dice throw of 2, citing that Odyssea would "disperse in the mass of bands lacking talent whom we never hear from again".

The German music zine Eternity gave a resounding 0 of 6 points. The reviewer cringed after 20 seconds, and claimede that he had to pause the album "every 10 to 20 seconds". The reviewer found the songwriting to be mired in Italian power metal clichés, and the production was nont good either. "Class action lawsuits should really be initiated against bands and releases like these, because the reputational damage to the 'prog' and 'power' metal genres caused by precisely these records is simply irreparable". Another German zine Amboss also pointed out the great similarity to Labyrinth, but added that the guitar was more prominent, making Tears in Floods a "listenable", "quite diverse and quite enjoyable album".

Another good score was Dangerdog Music's 4/5 review of Odyssea's second album Storm, which was released in 2015. The album was made by Gonella and Tiranti as a duo, but featured a "huge host" of guest musicians, including Alessandro Del Vecchio, Giorgia Gueglio, Steve Vawamas, Wild Steel and Andrea De Paoli.
