= Wine of Heaven =

Studio album by Mastercastle
- Released: 19 May 2017
- Recorded: September 2015 – September 2016, at "MusicArt" Studios, Genoa, Italy
- Genre: Melodic Metal, hard rock
- Length: 55:05
- Label: Scarlet Records
- Producer: Pier Gonella, Mastercastle

Mastercastle chronology
Enfer (De La Bibliothèque Nationale) (2017)	Wine of Heaven (2017)	Lighthouse Pathetic (2022)

Wine of Heaven is the seventh album of the Italian heavy metal band Mastercastle.

== History ==
The album was recorded starting from January 2016 and was finished in January 2017 at MusicArt studios. (Genoa, Italy), but the composition began on 2015. As for the previous album Enfer (De La Bibliothèque Nationale), the producer was Pier Gonella.

== Lyrics ==
All lyrics were written by Giorgia Gueglio that consider ‘Wine Of Heaven’ as "a journey through the aroma of the “Nectar of the Gods", wandering among the meanderings of the mind, discovering the flavor of life, loneliness and passion" but the album is not considered as a concept album about.

Professional ratings
Review scores
Source	Rating
*Dungerdog Music Review	5/5 stars

== Track listing ==
No.	Title	Writer(s)	Length
1.	"Drink Of Me"	Giorgia Gueglio, Pier Gonella	4:18
2.	"Space of variations"	Gueglio, Gonella	4:16
3.	"Wine of heaven"	Gueglio, Gonella	3:47
4.	"Hot as blood"	Gueglio, Gonella	4:08
5.	"Shine on me"	Gueglio, Gonella	4:31
6.	"Black tree's heart"	Gueglio, Gonella	4:41
7.	"Englightenment"	Gueglio, Gonella	3:07
8.	"Castle in the sky"	Joe Hisaishi	3:46
9.	"Making love"	Yngwie Malmsteen	3:42

== Line up ==
- Giorgia Gueglio – voice
- Pier Gonella – guitars
- Steve Vawamas – bass
- Alessio Spallarossa – drums
