= Return to Heaven Denied Pt. II: "A Midnight Autumn's Dream" =

Studio album by Labyrinth
- Released: June 21st, 2010
- Genre: Power metal
- Length: 57:13
- Label: Scarlet Records
- Producer: Olaf Thorsen and Labyrinth

Labyrinth chronology
6 Days to Nowhere (2007)	Return to Heaven Denied Pt. II: "A Midnight Autumn's Dream" (2010)	Architecture of a God (2017)

Professional ratings
Review scores
Source	Rating
Rock Hard	8/10

Return to Heaven Denied Pt. II: "A Midnight Autumn's Dream" is Italian power metal band Labyrinth's seventh album, released on June 21, 2010. The album had been announced in 2009. The former guitarist of the band, Olaf Thorsen, who had parted ways with the group in 2002, is back to perform, following Pier Gonella's departure.

The album is a follow-up of their 1998 album Return to Heaven Denied.

== Track listing ==
1. "The Shooting Star" – 8:09
2. "A Chance" – 5:49
3. "Like Shadows in the Dark" – 5:30
4. "Princess of the Night" – 5:49
5. "Sailors of Time" – 4:30
6. "To Where We Belong" – 4:46
7. "A Midnight Autumn's Dream" – 6:51
8. "The Morning's Call" – 6:35
9. "In This Void" – 4:35
10. "A Painting on the Wall" – 5:18

Japanese bonus tracks

11. "You Don't Remember, I'll Never Forget" (Yngwie Malmsteen cover)
12. "A Midnight Autumn's Dream" (acoustic version, featuring Irene Fornaciari)

== Line-up ==
- Roberto Tiranti (Rob Tyrant) - Vocals, Bass
- Andrea Cantarelli (Anders Rain) - Guitar
- Carlo Andrea Magnani (Olaf Thorsen) - Guitar
- Andrea de Paoli (Andrew McPauls) - Keyboards
- Alessandro Bissa - Drums
