= The Age of Dead Christ =

Studio album by Necrodeath
- Released: March 2018
- Genres: Black metal, thrash metal
- Length: 32:51
- Label: Scarlet Records

Necrodeath chronology
The 7 Deadly Sins (2014)	The Age of Dead Christ (2018)	Defragments of Insanity (2019)

The Age of Dead Christ is the eleventh album by Italian extreme metal band Necrodeath, released in March 2018 by Scarlet Records.

The album name refers to 33, the current age of Necrodeath as a band, as well as the age upon which Jesus is thought by many to have died. A.C. Wild of Bulldozer was guest vocalist on "The Return of The Undead", which furthermore built on "The Undead" from Into the Macabre (1987).

== Reception ==
Metal Hammer Italia issued 85 of 100 points, reasoning that the album was "one of the Genoese band's best works".

Powermetal.de's reviewer conceded that the album had strengths, but unfortunately "the album lacks truly powerful moments that could spark long-term interest". The score was 6 out of 10. Dead Rhetoric were reserved too, giving 7 points and commenting that "other countries and bands do it better". The songs on The Age of Dead Christ were "mostly scattershot and only mildly memorable". Metalitalia.com's score was somewhat higher, 7.5 out of 10.

== Track listing ==
1. "The Whore of Salem" – 3:38
2. "The Master of Mayhem" – 2:45
3. "The Order of Baphomet" – 2:36
4. "The Kings of Rome" – 2:53
5. "The Triumph of Pain" – 3:48
6. "The Return of the Undead" – 4:11
7. "The Crypt of Nyarlathotep" – 4:12
8. "The Revenge of the Witches" – 4:15
9. "The Age of Dead Christ" – 4:33
