= The 7 Deadly Sins (Necrodeath album) =

Studio album by Necrodeath
- Released: 13 May 2014
- Genres: Black metal, thrash metal
- Length: 40:39
- Label: Scarlet Records

Necrodeath chronology
Idiosyncrasy (2011)	The 7 Deadly Sins (2014)	The Age of Dead Christ (2018)

The 7 Deadly Sins is the tenth album by the Italian extreme metal band Necrodeath.

The individual songs on the album are named after each of the seven deadly sins. In addition, the album closes with re-recordings of "Thanatoid" from Fragments of Insanity (1989) and "Graveyard of the Innocents" from Into the Macabre (1987). The 7 Deadly Sins was also the band's first album with lyrics in the Italian language.

== Reception ==
Rock Hard regarded the seven deadly sins concept as not "really a new or particularly original idea"; a "tired old theme". Their review of the album yielded the score 6 out of 10.

Writing for Metal Crypt, Luxi Lahtinen regarded The 7 Deadly Sins as the best Necrodeath album, and possibly the best thrash metal album of 2014. Metal.de praised the opening of the album, first with a "flawless warm-up", then with "unbridled riff firework". Wrote the reviewer, "Wow, wow, wow! The first two tracks alone combine guitar ideas that other bands dream of". Furthermore, the sound was "pleasantly organic" and Necrodeath managed to "find an exciting blend of brutality and technical skill", evoking several 1980s metal bands. The score was 8 out of 10. Metal Forces lowered the score slightly to 7.5/10, but found that "As blackened thrash metal goes you can’t go wrong with Necrodeath". This score was echoed by Metalitalia.com.

Norway's Scream Magazine scored the album a 5 out of 6, arguing that the succeeding in reproducing most of the staples of the band's music: the sound, the riffs and the drum work. Wrote the reviewer, "I especially dig the usage of tom drums which draws the mind towards Sepultura's Schziophrenia". The Norwegian edition of Metal Hammer gave a 7 out of 10, especially praising the "deluge of head-over-heels riffing" and the "updated production".

== Track listing ==
No.	Title	Length
1.	"Sloth"	3:16
2.	"Lust"	5:33
3.	"Envy"	4:04
4.	"Pride"	4:44
5.	"Wrath"	2:25
6.	"Gluttony"	5:18
7.	"Greed"	7:09
8.	"Thanatoid"	4:49
9.	"Graveyard of the Innocents"	3:21

== Personnel ==
- Flegias: vocals
- Peso: drums
- Pier Gonella: guitar
- GL: bass
