= 100% Hell =

Studio album by Necrodeath
- Released: 17 April 2006
- Recorded: January 2006
- Genre: Extreme metal
- Length: 38:49
- Label: Scarlet Records

Necrodeath chronology
20 Years of Noise 1985 - 2005 (2005)	100% Hell (2006)	Draculea (2007)

100% Hell is the sixth album of the Italian extreme metal band Necrodeath. Cronos of Venom is the guest vocalist on February 5, 1984, Federica Badalini of Soul Takers plays keyboards on Identity Crisis, Sonya Scarlet of Theatres des Vampires make a duet with Flegias on 100% Hell.

Norway's Scream Magazine scored the album 5 out of 6, citing that Necrodeath managed to display "a little extra" even though the riffs were very true to traditional thrash metal. The album would befit fans of any metal genre, being both "clinically produced" while also retaining "the somewhat dirty sound". Rock Hard gave a similarly strong score, 8.5 out of 10. If Necrodeath was the in-house band in Hell, "I'll order a season ticket right away!". Denmark's Heavymetal.dk rated it as a 7. While the album contained highlights such as "Forever Slave" and "Master og Morphine", other songs, namely "Wave" and "Identity Crisis" were "boring tracks, to put it mildly". Vampster wrote that though the album title was somewhat misleading, Necrodeath "have a knack for crafting compelling songs in the death/thrash genre", but did not fully live up to Black As Pitch.

== Track listing ==
No.	Title	Length
1.	"February 5, 1984"	0:57
2.	"Forever Slaves"	3:22
3.	"War Paint"	4:36
4.	"Master Of Morphine"	4:20
5.	"The Wave"	3:52
6.	"Theoretical And Artificial"	3:25
7.	"Identity Crisis"	4:28
8.	"Beautiful Brutal World"	3:15
9.	"Hyperbole"	0:55
10.	"100% Hell"	9:38

== Credits ==
- Flegias: vocals
- Peso: drums
- Andy: guitar
- John: bass

Guests

- Cronos: vocals on February 5, 1984
- Federica Badalini: keyboards on Identity Crisis
- Sonya Scarlet: vocals on 100% Hell
