= Vanexa =

Italian heavy metal band

Vanexa is an Italian heavy metal band formed in 1979.

== Biography ==
Born in Savona in 1979, thanks to the founding members Roberto Merlone (guitar), Sergio Pagnacco (bass) and Silvano Bottari (drums), the band's style is based on British metal sounds, typical of the NWOBHM. Vanexa were part of the new wave of heavy metal band made in Italy in the late 70s early 80s, like band as Vanadium, Sabotage and Strana Officina. They participated as the headliner at Rock in a Hard Place Festival in Certaldo in the province of Florence, May 21, 1983.

In their careers they participated in compilation metal, such as Mountain of Metal, output in the United States, with the song "Hanged Man" and "Metallo Italia" with the song "It's Over". In 2007 they have been reissued on CD their first album Vanexa with 3 unreleased tracks, and their second album "Back From The Ruins" with five live tracks taken from a concert in 1984.

The first member in first demo, saw presence of Sergio Pagnacco and Silvano Bottari with Fabrizio Cruciani on vocals and Roberto Merlone on guitar. The first album was titled with the same name of Vanexa and was released in 1983 on Durium label with Marco Spinelli on vocals, like also in the second disc Back From The Ruins recorder on Minotauro and published in 1988.

After several years of silence, it comes time to Against The Sun, the third disc of the group that comes out March 6, 1994 still on Minotauro label. This time on vocals was Roberto Tiranti, in future voice of Labyrinth band and in particular in New Trolls prog band (later New Trolls's Legend).

In 2010 it was printed on CD and on vinyl in a limited edition 1979/1980, a compilation of songs sung in Italian of the period 1979 - 1980. In 2011 Vanexa released the first official live album from the band, titled Metal City Live, recorded at heavy metal festival Play It Loud III of 2009.

In 2012 he joined the group the guitarist Pier Gonella, member Necrodeath and Mastercastle [1].

In 2015 the band released a single of two songs ( "Too Heavy to Fly" and "Paradox") as a preview of the new album "Too Heavy to Fly" [2]. Subsequently, the good responses of the individual (first place in the Hard & Heavy section of Amazon), leading in 2016 to the decision to record the whole album "Too Heavy to Fly" with the label Punishment 18 Records on CD and with the Black Widow Records on vinyl (3 different editions).

== Band members ==
=== Current Line-up ===
- Andrea "Ranfa" Ranfagni – vocals (2015–present)
- Artan Selishta – guitars (2009–present)
- Pier Gonella – guitars (2012–present)
- Sergio Pagnacco – bass (1979–1995, 2009–present)
- Silvano Bottari – drums (1979–1995, 2009–present)

=== Past Members ===
- Roberto Merlone – guitars (1979–1995; died 2019)
- Fabrizio Cruciani – vocals (1979–1980)
- Alfio Vitanza – vocals (1980)
- Marco Spinelli – vocals (1980–1989)
- Roberto Tiranti – vocals (1989–1995, 2009–2015)
- Alessandro Graziano – guitars (2009–2012)

=== Session Members ===
- Giorgio Pagnacco – keyboards (1988, 1994)

== Discography ==
=== Studio albums ===
- 1983 - Vanexa
- 1988 - Back from the Ruins
- 1994 - Against the Sun
- 2016 - Too Heavy To Fly
- 2021 - last to black

=== Other Releases ===
- 2010 - 1979-1980 (demos)
- 2011 - Metal City Live
