= De Rerum Natura (album) =

Studio album by Moonlight Haze
- Released: 21 June 2019
- Recorded: 2018
- Genre: Power metal; symphonic metal
- Length: 49:07
- Label: Scarlet

Moonlight Haze chronology
De Rerum Natura (2019)	Lunaris (2020)

Professional ratings
Review scores
Source	Rating
Arrow Lords of Metal	8/10
Dead Rhetoric	9/10
Femme Metal	85/100
Metal Discovery	6.5/10
Metal Express Radio	8.5/10

De Rerum Natura is the debut studio album by Italian symphonic metal band Moonlight Haze. The album was released on 21 June 2019, through Scarlet Records.

== Track listing ==
No.	Title	Length
1.	"To the Moon and Back"	3:39
2.	"Ad Astra"	3:37
3.	"Odi et Amo"	4:37
4.	"The Butterfly Effect"	3:31
5.	"Time" (featuring Mark Jansen and Laura Macrì)	4:45
6.	"Dark Corners of Myself"	8:46
7.	"A Restless Mind"	4:03
8.	"Deceiver"	4:43
9.	"A Shelter from the Storm"	6:32
10.	"Goddess"	4:54
Total length:		49:07

== Personnel ==
Moonlight Haze

- Chiara Tricarico – lead vocals
- Alberto Melinato – guitars
- Marco Falanga – guitars
- Alessandro Jacobi – bass
- Giulio Capone – drums, keyboards

Additional musicians

- Mark Jansen – vocals (track 5)
- Laura Macrì – vocals (track 5)
