= 6 Days to Nowhere =

Studio album by Labyrinth
- Released: February 26, 2007
- Genre: Heavy metal, progressive metal
- Length: 57:13
- Label: Scarlet Records

Labyrinth chronology
Freeman (2005)	6 Days to Nowhere (2007)	Return to Heaven Denied Pt. II: "A Midnight Autumn's Dream" (2010)

Professional ratings
Review scores
Source	Rating
Allmusic	3/5 stars
Rock Hard	6/10
Metal.de	6/10

6 Days to Nowhere is Italian power metal band Labyrinth's sixth album, released February 26, 2007 on Scarlet Records.

== Track listing ==
1. "Crossroads" – 4:03
2. "There Is a Way" – 3:36
3. "Lost" – 4:24
4. "Mother Earth" – 6:08
5. "Waiting Tomorrow" – 3:35
6. "Come Together" – 4:00 (The Beatles cover)
7. "Just One Day" – 3:54
8. "What???" – 4:15
9. "Coldness" – 3:49
10. "Rusty Nail" – 3:19
11. "Out of Control" – 3:46
12. "Wolves'n'Lambs" – 4:52
13. "Smoke and Dreams" – 4:37
14. "Piece of Time" – 2:50 (2007 re-recorded version)

== Personnel ==
- Roberto Tiranti - Vocals, Bass
- Andrea Cantarelli - Guitars
- Pier Gonella - Guitars
- Andrea De Paoli - Keyboards
- Mattia Stancioiu - Drums
