= Ton(e)s of Hate =

Studio album by Necrodeath
- Released: September 12, 2003
- Recorded: 2003
- Genre: Extreme metal
- Length: 38:11
- Label: Scarlet Records

Necrodeath chronology
Black as Pitch (2001)	Ton(e)s of Hate (2003)	20 Years of Noise 1985–2005 (2005)

Professional ratings
Review scores
Source	Rating
AllMusic	3/5 stars
Kronic	3.5/5 stars
Scream	5/6 stars
Rock Hard	7.5/10 stars

Ton(e)s of Hate is the fifth studio album by the Italian extreme metal band Necrodeath.

== Track listing ==
1. "Mealy-Mouthed Hypocrisy" - 4:28
2. "Perseverance Pays" - 3:33
3. "The Mark of Dr.Z" - 3:26
4. "The Flag" - 3:22
5. "Queen of Desire" - 3:40
6. "Petition for Mercy" - 3:39
7. "Last Ton(e)s of Hate" - 3:34
8. "Evidence from Beyond" - 4:28
9. "Bloodstain Pattern" - 7:55

== Personnel ==
- Flegias – vocals
- Peso – drums
- Claudio – guitars
- John – bass guitar
