= Animus (album) =

Studio album by Moonlight Haze
- Released: 18 March 2022
- Recorded: 2021
- Genre: Symphonic metal; power metal
- Length: 42:00
- Label: Scarlet

Moonlight Haze chronology
Lunaris (2020)	Animus (2022)	Beyond (2025)

Singles from Animus
- 1. "Animus" Released: 10 December 2021; 2. "We'll Be Free" Released: 10 January 2022; 3. "Kintsugi" Released: 28 June 2022

Professional ratings
Review scores
Source	Rating
The Dark Melody	8/10
Frenzy Fire	10/10
GBHBL	8.5/10
Metal Factory	7/10
Metal Goddesses	7/10
Metal-Roos	5/5

Animus is the third studio album by Italian symphonic metal band Moonlight Haze. The album was released on 18 March 2022, through Scarlet Records.

== Track listing ==
All lyrics are written by Chiara Tricarico; all music is composed by Giulio Capone, with "It's Insane" co-written by Tricarico.

No.	Title	Length
1.	"The Nothing"	3:59
2.	"It's Insane"	3:34
3.	"Kintsugi"	4:09
4.	"Animus"	3:41
5.	"The Thief and the Moon"	3:28
6.	"Midnight Haze"	3:52
7.	"Tonight"	3:35
8.	"Never Say Never"	4:22
9.	"We'll Be Free"	4:02
10.	"A Ritual of Fire"	3:52
11.	"Horror & Thunder"	3:26
Total length:		42:00

== Personnel ==
- Chiara Tricarico – lead vocals
- Alberto Melinato – guitars
- Marco Falanga – guitars
- Alessandro Jacobi – bass, backing vocals, co-lead vocals on "Horror & Thunder"
- Giulio Capone – drums, keyboards, backing vocals
