= Highlord =

Italian power metal band

Highlord is an Italian power metal band from Turin. The band issued several albums, among others one on Scarlet Records and two on Massacre Records.

== Discography ==
- Heir of Power (1999, Northwind Records)
- When the Aurora Falls... (2000, Northwind Records)
- Breath of Eternity (2002, Northwind Records)
- Medusa's Coil (2004, Arise Records)
- Instant Madness (2006)
- The Death of the Artists (2009, Scarlet Records)
- The Warning After (2013, Punishment 18 Records)
- Hic Sunt Leones (2016, Massacre Records)
- Freakin' Out of Hell (2022, Massacre Records)

Highlord has also appeared on tribute albums to Helloween and Stratovarius.
