= Arimortis =

Studio album by Necrodeath
- Released: 17 January 2025
- Genres: Black metal, thrash metal
- Length: 38:37
- Label: Time to Kill Records

Necrodeath chronology
Singin' in the Pain (2023)	Arimortis (2025)

Arimortis is the fourteenth album by Italian extreme metal band Necrodeath, released in January 2025 by Time to Kill Records.

It was described as their last album.

== Reception ==
The reviewer in Norway Rock Magazine opined that Necrodeath did go out on a respectable note, deserving 4 points out of 6, playing "angry death/thrash" that stayed true to their oldest material. Specific nods to their early material include a re-recording of "Necrosadist" from Into the Macabre (1987) and a "part two" to "Metempsychosis" from Fragments of Insanity (1989). Metal Hammer Italia issued 85 of 100 points, summing up the performance as "killer drumming, guitar as sharp as a knife, pulsating bass and a Flegias on top". Metal Temple followed suit with an 8 out of 10 review, calling Arimortis "a perfect final power chord to mark the end of a stunning career". Metalitalia.com's score was somewhat lower still, 7.5 out of 10, stating that Arimortis contained essences of their whole career's releases. The music was "simple and direct" and "without any major surprises or twists".

== Track listing ==
1. "Storytellers of Lies" – 3:37
2. "New God" – 3:12
3. "Necrosadist" – 3:57
4. "Arimortis" – 3:39
5. "Near-Death Experience" – 3:07
6. "Alien" – 4:21
7. "No More Regrets" – 5:37
8. "Metempsychosis (Part Two)" – 7:21
9. "Hangover" – 3:46
