= Celestial Wizard =

American power metal band

Celestial Wizard is an American metal band that blends power metal and melodic death metal. The band released two albums on Scarlet Records.

The band hails from Denver and released their first album A Sinister Awakening in 2018. After releasing their first two albums independently, Winds of the Cosmos from 2022 was re-released by Scarlet Records in 2023.

== Discography ==
- A Sinister Awakening (2018)
- Winds of the Cosmos (2022)
- Regenesis (2025, Scarlet Records)
