= Enfer (De La Bibliothèque Nationale) =

Enfer [De La Bibliothèque Nationale]

Studio album by Mastercastle
- Released: 14 October 2014
- Recorded: June – August 2014, at MusicArt Studios, Genoa, Italy
- Genre: Neoclassical metal, hard rock, gothic metal
- Length: 39:05
- Label: Scarlet Records
- Producer: Pier Gonella

Mastercastle chronology
On Fire (2013)	Enfer [De La Bibliothèque Nationale] (2014)	Wine of Heaven (2017)

Professional ratings
Review scores
Source	Rating
*Extrememetal.tv	9/10 stars
*All Around Metal	10/10 stars
*Ravenheartmusic.com	9/10 stars

Enfer [De La Bibliothèque Nationale] is the fifth album of the Italian heavy metal band Mastercastle. The lyrics of the album tell about a secret section of the National Library of Paris. There are also two instrumental tracks, the first "Coming Bach" is a remake of the Prelude in D minor BWV 999 by Johann Sebastian Bach.

== History ==
The album was recorded starting from June 2014 and was finished in August 2014. It was recorded by Pier Gonella and mixed by Pier Gonella and Giuseppe Orlando at MusicArt studios.

== Track listing ==
All lyrics by Giorgia Gueglio.

No.	Title	Writer(s)	Length
1.	"The Castle"	Mastercastle	4:18
2.	"Let Me Out"	Mastercastle	4:16
3.	"Naked"	Mastercastle	3:47
4.	"Pirates"	Mastercastle	4:08
5.	"Enfer"	Mastercastle	4:31
6.	"Straight To The Bone"	Mastercastle	4:41
7.	"Throne Of Time"	Mastercastle	3:07
8.	"Behind the Veil"	Mastercastle	3:46
9.	"Venice"	Mastercastle	3:42
10.	"Coming Bach"	Mastercastle	2:52
11.	"Cat-House"	Mastercastle	4:57
12.	"Alone"	Mastercastle	3:54

== Line up ==
- Giorgia Gueglio – voice
- Pier Gonella – guitars
- Steve Vawamas – bass
- Francesco La Rosa – drums
