= The Age of Fear =

Compilation album by Necrodeath
- Released: 26 May 2011
- Genre: Thrash metal
- Label: Scarlet Records

Necrodeath chronology
Old Skull (2010)	The Age of Fear (2011)	Idiosyncrasy (2011)

Professional ratings
Review scores
Source	Rating
Metal.de	Mixed
Scream Magazine	Favourable
Metalitalia.com	7/10

The Age of Fear is a compilation album by Italian thrash metal band Necrodeath. It was released in May 2011 by the label Scarlet Records.

== History ==
The Age of Fear is a collection containing 15 tracks, the first 12 of which are taken from the band's past eight albums, arranged in reverse-chronological order. Track 13 is a previously-unreleased live recording, and track 14 is a completely remade version of an earlier song featuring keyboardist Botys Beezard and singer Giorgia Gueglio. Track 13 and 14 were produced by Pier Gonella at MusicArt studios. The artwork was made by French artist Pierre-Alain D. from 3mmi Design studio.

== Track listing ==
1. "Mater Tenebrarum" (2010)
2. "Awakening of Dawn" (2009)
3. "I.N.R.I." (2009)
4. "Smell of Blood" (2007)
5. "Master of Morphine" (2006)
6. "Forever Slave" (2006)
7. "Queen of Desire" (2003)
8. "Burn and Deny" (2001)
9. "Hate and Scorn" (1999)
10. "Flame of Malignance" (1999)
11. "Eucharistical Sacrifice" (1989)
12. "At The Mountains of Madness" (1987)
13. "The Theory" (live, 2010)
14. "Queen of Desire" (Onyric version, 2011)
15. "Black Magic" (Slayer cover, 2010)

== Line up ==
- Flegias - Vocals
- Pier Gonella - Guitars
- GL - Bass
- Peso - Drums
- Botys Beezard - keyboards on track 14 (guest)
- Giorgia Gueglio - vocals on track 14 (guest)
