= Lunaris =

Studio album by Moonlight Haze
- Released: 12 June 2020
- Recorded: 2019–2020
- Genre: Symphonic power metal
- Length: 51:47
- Label: Scarlet

Moonlight Haze chronology
De Rerum Natura (2019)	Lunaris (2020)	Animus (2022)

Singles from Lunaris
- 1. "Till the End" Released: 6 May 2020; 2. "Enigma" Released: 5 April 2021

Professional ratings
Review scores
Source	Rating
Dead Rhetoric	9/10
Frenzy Fire	11/10
GBHBL	6.5/10
Heavymetal.dk	2/10
Metal Express Radio	8/10

Lunaris is the second studio album by Italian symphonic metal band Moonlight Haze. The album was released on 12 June 2020, through Scarlet Records. The album has received mostly positive feedback. It was produced just months after their debut album De Rerum Natura, in late 2019 and early 2020, though its release was delayed due to the COVID-19 pandemic which also caused the cancellation of some shows planned to promote the album.

== Track listing ==
All lyrics are written by Chiara Tricarico; all music is composed by Giulio Capone, except "Under Your Spell" written by Tricarico and "Of Birth and Death" written by Fabio Lethien Polo.

No.	Title	Length
1.	"Till the End"	3:28
2.	"The Rabbit of the Moon"	3:51
3.	"Lunaris"	3:57
4.	"Under Your Spell"	3:49
5.	"Enigma"	4:51
6.	"Wish upon a Scar"	4:28
7.	"The Dangerous Art of Overthinking"	6:46
8.	"Without You"	4:31
9.	"Of Birth and Death"	3:40
10.	"Nameless City"	7:34
Total length:		46:55

Bonus track
No.	Title	Length
11.	"Enigma" (English version)	4:52
Total length:		51:47

== Personnel ==
- Chiara Tricarico – lead vocals
- Alberto Melinato – guitars
- Marco Falanga – guitars
- Alessandro Jacobi – bass, co-lead vocals on "Nameless City"
- Giulio Capone – drums, keyboards
