= Mater of All Evil =

Studio album by Necrodeath
- Released: December 20, 1999
- Recorded: September 1999
- Genre: Extreme metal
- Length: 35:39
- Label: Scarlet Records

Necrodeath chronology
Fragments of Insanity (1989)	Mater of All Evil (1999)	Black as Pitch (2001)

Professional ratings
Review scores
Source	Rating
Allmusic	link
Vampster	Favourable

Mater of All Evil is the third studio album of the Italian extreme metal band Necrodeath.

The album came ten years after Necrodeath's previous release, following a hiatus. Rock Hard appreciated the return, both for all who missed their 1980s albums, as well as the album being "an absolute must for older thrash fans". The score was 8 out of 10.

Metal.de interjected "Buy!", giving a 9 out of 10 score. The band took the best from the 1980s extreme metal bands and had a good singer. Their style was "uncompromising, neck-breaking metal, played so well that even Swordmaster and Bewitched would turn green with envy".

== Track listing ==
1. The Creature - 2:23
2. Flame Of Malignance - 2:59
3. Black Soul - 3:38
4. Hate And Scorn - 3:16
5. Iconoclast - 4:18
6. Void Of Naxir - 3:04
7. Anticipation Of Death - 2:37
8. Experiment In Terror - 3:14
9. Serpent - 2:21
10. At The Roots Of Evil - 3:58
11. Fathers - 3:45

== Credits ==
- Flegias: vocals
- Peso: drums
- Claudio: guitars
- John: bass
