= The Phoenix (Mastercastle album) =

Studio album by Mastercastle
- Released: 17 April 2009
- Recorded: November, 2008 – December, 2008 at Quake Sound Studios , Genoa, Italy
- Genre: Neoclassical metal, hard rock
- Label: Lion Music
- Producer: Pier Gonella

Mastercastle chronology
The Phoenix (2009)	Last Desire (2010)

Professional ratings
Review scores
Source	Rating
Dangerdog Music Reviews	5/5 stars

The Phoenix is the debut album of Italian heavy metal band Mastercastle.

== History ==
The album was recorded in November and December 2008 at MusicArt studios (previously called Quakesound) (Genoa, Italy), but the composition began on July. The producer was Pier Gonella. For the song "Princess of love" was produced a videoclip. After the release of the album (17 April 2009) the Japanese label Spiritual Beast offered a deal to release a Japanese edition of the album, that was published on 20 September 2009 with 2 bonus track. One of them is the cover of the song Alien Nation, written by the hard rock/heavy metal band Scorpions.

== Lyrics ==
The Phoenix is not a concept album. All lyrics are written by Giorgia Gueglio and are mostly influenced by human nature as well as forgotten tales and events. In particular the song Greedy Blade tells about the disaster of Vajont, a dam on the Italian Alps that after a landslide, created a giant wave that destroyed towns and villages in the valley.

== Track listing ==
1. "Words Are Swords"
2. "Princess of Love"
3. "Space"
4. "My Screams"
5. "Lullaby Noir"
6. "The Phoenix"
7. "Greedy Blade"
8. "Dawn of Promises"
9. "Memories"
10. "Cradle of Stone"

== Line up ==
- Giorgia Gueglio - voice
- Pier Gonella - guitars
- Steve Vawamas - bass
- Alessandro Bissa Bix - drums
