= Beyond (Moonlight Haze album) =

Studio album by Moonlight Haze
- Released: 23 May 2025
- Recorded: 2024
- Genres: Symphonic metal; power metal
- Length: 36:07
- Label: Scarlet
- Producer: Sascha Paeth

Moonlight Haze chronology
Animus (2022)	Beyond (2025)	Interstellar Madness (2026)

Singles from Beyond
- 1. "Tame the Storm" Released: 27 March 2025; 2. "Chase the Light" Released: 18 April 2025; 3. "Awakening" Released: 11 May 2025

Professional ratings
Review scores
Source	Rating
The Dark Melody	8/10
Frenzy Fire	10/10
Heavyworlds.com	8/10
Metal Factory	8/10
Metal-Roos	5/5

Beyond is the fourth studio album by Italian symphonic metal band Moonlight Haze. The album was released on 23 May 2025, through Scarlet Records. The album was produced by Sascha Paeth, known for his production work with Avantasia, Kamelot, and Beyond the Black.

== Track listing ==
No.	Title	Length
1.	"Beyond"	2:18
2.	"Tame the Storm"	3:34
3.	"Crystallized"	3:00
4.	"Chase the Light"	3:41
5.	"Would You Dare?"	3:18
6.	"L'eco del silenzio"	5:51
7.	"D.N.A. (Do Not Apologize)"	3:36
8.	"Untold"	3:12
9.	"Time to Go"	4:02
10.	"Awakening"	3:35
Total length:		36:07

Bonus track
No.	Title	Length
11.	"A Brand New Sky"	3:34
Total length:		39:41

== Personnel ==
- Chiara Tricarico – vocals
- Alberto Melinato – guitars
- Marco Falanga – guitars
- Alessandro Jacobi – bass
- Giulio Capone – drums, keyboards
