= Shadows of Steel =

Italian power metal band

- Origin: Genoa, Italy
- Genre: Power metal
- Years active: 1996–present
- Labels: Underground Symphony, Metallic Blue
- Members: Wild Steel; Andrew McPauls; Ice Reaven; Matt Peruzzi; Andrew Spane; Fabio Zunino
- Past members: Steve Vawamas; Gianca; Andre la Fisic; Frank Andiver; Francis Scarlet; Vic Mazzoni; Jackson; Andrea "Tower" Torricini; Ross Lukather; Francesco Molinelli; Patrick LeGrand

Shadows of Steel is an Italian power metal band from Genoa, formed in 1996.

== History ==
The band was formed around vocalist Andrea "Wild Steel" De Stefanis, the only consistent member during the entirety of Shadows of Steel's existence. Wild Steel played in Projecto and Prometeo in his youth, which later became Shadows of Steel. The eponymous debut album Shadows of Steel (1997) was followed by two extended plays, Twilight (1998) and Heroes (2000) before their second album Second Floor (2002).

Rock Hard gave Shadows of Steel a 7.5 out of 10 score, and Second Floor a 6. Norway's Scream gave both albums 4 out of 6, citing that Second Floor was worth "checking out for fans of melodic power metal", but that it lacked "the very best tunes within the genre". The 1998 EP Twilight was a double disc with various cover songs on the second disc. The original songs, wrote Vampster, were impressive with their "tremendous freshness and considerably more bite than Kai Hansen and co". The album "possesses tremendous power and drive", though it featured a "thin production". The cover songs were "superbly executed".

With Shadows of Steel going on hiatus after Second Floor, Athlantis and Odyssea were started, both of which shared members with Shadows of Steel and featured guest vocals by Wild Steel. The latter also did the vocals in the one-album band Soulblaze in 2005. Furthermore, Wild Steel set up an eponymous project that released three albums; Wild Steel (2006), Transcending Glory (2011) and Age of Steel (2023).

Shadows of Steel returned with Crown of Steel in 2013. Wild Steel added keyboardist Andrea De Paoli ("Andrew McPauls"), drummer Frank Andiver, bassist Steve Vawamas and guitarists Ice Reaven, Jackson and Andre la Fisic, all of whom had played in Shadows of Steel before. Metal.de scored Crown of Steel 6 out of 10, though the band was praised it for being less kitschy than Rhapsody of Fire, regularly getting "back on track before things threaten to tip over into the abyss of kitsch".

The band then released an EP Twilight II in 2022, followed by an album of the same name and same artwork in 2024 Twilight II. The difference was four more songs on the latter release, three of whom were original. The 2024 release, then, contained five cover songs overall.

== Members ==
Current

- Wild Steel – vocals (1996–2002, 2011–present)
- Andrew McPauls – keyboards (1996–1997, 2011–present)
- Ice Reaven – guitars (1999–2002, 2011–present)
- Matt Peruzzi – drums (2017–present)
- Andrew Spane – guitars (2017–present)
- Fabio Zunino – bass (2021–present)

Former

- Steve Vawamas – bass (1996–2002, 2012–2013)
- Gianca – drums (1996–1997)
- Andre la Fisic – guitars (1996–1999, 2011–2012)
- Frank Andiver – drums (1997–2002)
- Francis Scarlet – keyboards (1997–2000)
- Vic Mazzoni – guitars (1998)
- Jackson – guitars (1999–2002, 2011–2017)
- Andrea "Tower" Torricini – bass (2011–2012)
- Ross Lukather – drums (2011–2017)
- Francesco Molinelli – bass (2015–2018)
- Patrick LeGrand – bass (2018–2021)

== Discography ==
Studio albums

- Shadows of Steel (1997, Underground Symphony)
- Second Floor (2002, Underground Symphony)
- Crown of Steel (2013, Underground Symphony)
- Twilight II (2024, Metallic Blue Records)

EPs

- Twilight (1998, Underground Symphony)
- Heroes (2000, Underground Symphony)
- Twilight II (2022, Underground Symphony)

== Reception of Wild Steel ==
Wild Steel was a double album where the second disc was a tribute to Crimson Glory, which was also the case with Transcending Glory in its entirety.

According to Powermetal.de, the original songs on Wild Steel were "bombastic-sounding, powerful, at times subtly progressive, and wonderfully melodic metal, which is as magnificently arranged as it sounds perfectly from the speakers". The album contained a broad array of styles, up-tempo songs and ballads, and most importantly, Wild Steel's vocals expressed emotion and grandeur while suppressing "the kitsch factor" which is a peril within power metal. The cover songs were "truly impressively intoned versions".

Hellfire-Magazin gave Age Of Steel 6.5 of 10 points. The intro was as "symphonic and kitsch" as could be expected from an Italian power metal band. The album balanced between high-speed power metal and ballads, with the "cuddly rock" style shining through at times; the "somewhat over-the-top vocals" of one particular song made it "so difficult to bear that you'll want to hit the skip button". The ballads were the drawback of Age Of Steel, according to the reviewer.
