= Sons of Thunder (Labyrinth album) =

Studio album by Labyrinth
- Released: 22 August 2000
- Recorded: October - December 1999
- Studio: Jungle Sound Station
- Genre: Power metal
- Length: 50:31
- Label: Metal Blade
- Producer: Neil Kernon

Labyrinth chronology
Return to Heaven Denied (1998)	Sons of Thunder (2000)	Labyrinth (2003)

Professional ratings
Review scores
Source	Rating
Rock Hard	8/10
Metal.de	5/10
Powermetal.de	
Vampster	¨

Sons of Thunder is the third album by Italian power metal band, Labyrinth. It is a concept album written about King Louis XIV's (also known as 'The Sun King') obsession with a woman named Kathryn. "I Feel You" is an English rendition of the famous Matia Bazar's song "Ti Sento".

== Track listing ==
1. "Chapter 1" - 6:02
2. "Kathryn" - 5:04
3. "Sons of Thunder" - 5:02
4. "Elegy" - 4:40
5. "Behind the Mask" - 4:29
6. "Touch the Rainbow" - 5:17
7. "Rage of the King" - 4:55
8. "Save Me" - 6:10
9. "Love" - 4:35
10. "I Feel You" - 4:17

== Personnel ==
=== Band members ===
- Rob Tyrant – Vocals
- Andrew McPauls – Keyboards
- Anders Rain – Guitar
- Olaf Thorsen – Guitar
- Mat Stancioiu – Drums
- Chris Breeze - Bass

However, for this album, bass line was composed and played by Gabriele D'Ascoli (reported on credits as an additional recorder) due to internal and temporary problems with line up

=== Production ===
- Neil Kernon - Engineer, Mixing
- Alfredo Cappello - Engineer, Remixing
- Claudio Giussani - Mastering
- Simone Bianchi - Cover concept and painting
- Wowe - Photos
- Grafica Bisinella - Layout
