= Last Desire =

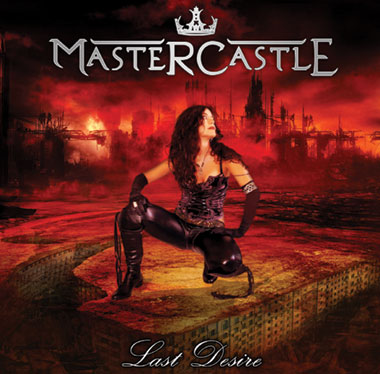

Studio album by Mastercastle
- Released: 18 June 2010
- Recorded: December 2009 – January 2010, at "Quake Sound" Studios, Genoa, Italy
- Genre: Neoclassical metal, hard rock
- Length: 55:05
- Label: Lion Music
- Producer: Pier Gonella

Mastercastle chronology
The Phoenix (2009)	Last Desire (2010)	Dangerous Diamonds (2011)

Last Desire is the second studio album of the Italian heavy metal band Mastercastle. The lyrics of the album tell about the concept of "desire". The track "La Serenissima" is a cover of the Italian ensemble Rondo Veneziano.

== History ==
The album was recorded in December 2009 and January 2010 at MusicArt studios (previously called Quakesound). (Genoa, Italy), but the composition began on June. As for the previous album The Phoenix, the producer was Pier Gonella.
In 2012 the label Lion Music released a special version of the album, including 4 bonus tracks:
Run Like Hell (Pink Floyd cover)
Greedy Blade (instrumental version)
Soldier of Fortune (Deep Purple cover), live acoustic version
Great Hevan's Climb (demo version)

== Lyrics ==
All lyrics were written by Giorgia Gueglio and the album can be considered a concept album about the "desire" theme. Giorgia Gueglio said in a recent interview: "We can consider the album as a concept. There is not a story but every song tells about a different meaning of the word "desire". This word seems so simple but the desire is the main engine of all our thoughts and actions. There is nothing programmed about it. There is something "intriguing", "sensual" and "energetic" in the songs and I did my best to express them with the lyrics".

Professional ratings
Review scores
Source	Rating
*Dangerdog Music Reviews	4.5/5 stars
*Sea of tranquillity	4/5 stars
*UsaProgRockMusic	8.5/10 stars

== Track listing ==
No.	Title	Writer(s)	Length
1.	"Event Horizon"	Giorgia Gueglio, Pier Gonella	4:08
2.	"Misr"	Gueglio, Gonella	4:55
3.	"Wild Spell"	Gueglio, Gonella	5:01
4.	"Last Desire"	Gueglio, Gonella	3:59
5.	"Away"	Gueglio, Gonella	4:07
6.	"Space Trip"	Gonella	4:53
7.	"Jade-Star"	Gueglio, Gonella, Steve Vawamas	4:40
8.	"Great Heaven's Climb"	Gueglio, Gonella	5:24
9.	"Cat-House"	Gueglio, Gonella	4:54
10.	"Toxie-Radd"	Gueglio, Gonella	4:49
11.	"La Serenissima"	Gian Piero Reverberi	3:15
12.	"Scarlett"	Gueglio, Gonella	4:31

== Line up ==
- Giorgia Gueglio – voice
- Pier Gonella – guitars
- Steve Vawamas – bass
- Alessandro Bissa Bix – drums
