= Welcome to the Absurd Circus =

Studio album by Labyrinth
- Released: 22 January 2021
- Genre: Power metal; progressive metal
- Length: 60:19
- Label: Frontiers
- Producer: Simone Mularoni

Labyrinth chronology
Architecture of a God (2017)	Welcome to the Absurd Circus (2021)	In the Vanishing Echoes of Goodbye (2025)

Welcome to the Absurd Circus is the ninth album by Italian power metal band Labyrinth, released on 22 January 2021 via Frontiers Records. It is their first album with drummer Mattia Peruzzi.

It was announced in October 2020. On 3 November 2020, the video for "The Absurd Circus" was released. On 1 December 2020, "Live Today" was streamed. On the day of the album's release, "Sleepwalker" was streamed.

== Critical reception ==
Professional ratings
Review scores
Source	Rating
Metal Hammer Italia	85/100
Metal.de	5/10
Rock Hard	7.5/10
Powermetal.de	8/10

Writing for Metal Hammer Italia, Gianfranco Monese said that the album, as the title suggests, is "a work where the band's trademark is mixed with extravagance, where the songs contain colorful solutions in order to play and sing the illogic of delicate times like these that have in the Coronavirus the icing on the cake". He also thought the album is more guitar-oriented than its predecessor, albeit "in step with the times".

== Track listing ==
Welcome to the Absurd Circus track listing
No.	Title	Length
1.	"The Absurd Circus"	6:18
2.	"Live Today"	5:40
3.	"One More Last Chance"	6:12
4.	"As Long As It Lasts"	5:18
5.	"Den of Snakes"	6:34
6.	"Word's Minefield"	5:12
7.	"The Unexpected"	5:06
8.	"Dancing with Tears in My Eyes" (Ultravox cover)	4:41
9.	"Sleepwalker"	4:25
10.	"A Reason to Survive"	4:30
11.	"Finally Free"	6:23
Total length:		60:19

== Personnel ==
Labyrinth

- Roberto Tiranti — lead vocals
- Andrea Cantarelli — guitars
- Olaf Thörsen — guitars
- Nik Mazzucconi — bass
- Oleg Smirnoff — keyboards
- Mattia Peruzzi — drums

Additional contributors

- Simone Mularoni — production, mastering, mixing, recording
- Federico Mondelli — artwork
