= Node (band) =

- Origin: Milan, Italy
- Genre: Death metal
- Years active: 1994–present
- Label: Lucretia (1995–2000) Scarlet (2000–2005, since 2009) Massacre (2005–2009) Scarlet (2010) Punishment 18 (2016)
- Members: CN Sid Gary D'Eramo Rudy Gonella Diaza Davide (Dero) De Robertis Pietro Battanta
- Past members: Giacomo "Jack" Lavatura Giuseppe Caruso Marco Di Salvia Daniel Botti Klaus Mariani Mario Giannini Joe La Viola Steve Minelli Loris Pacaccio Oinos John Manti Andrea "Attila" Caniato Gabriel Pignata
- Website: node.it

Node is an Italian death metal band formed in Milan in 1994 and currently signed to Punishment 18 Records. Their last (sixth) full-length studio album, Cowards Empire was released in 2016.

== Members ==
- CN Sid (since 2012)
- Gary D'Eramo – guitar (since 1995, except 1997–2000)
- Rudy Gonella Diaza – guitar (since 2012)
- Davide (Dero) De Robertis (since 2012)
- Pietro Battanta – drums (since 2010)

=== Former members ===
- Daniel Botti – vocals and guitar (1997–2009)
- Giacomo Lavatura – vocals (2010–2012)
- Marco Di Salvia – drums (2002–2011)
- Klaus Mariani – bass (1995–2010)
- Steve Minelli – guitar (1994–1999)
- Giuseppe Caruso – vocals (2009–2010)
- Mario Giannini – drums (2001–2002)
- Joe La Viola – drums (1999–2000)
- Loris Pacaccio – drums (1998–1999)
- Oinos – drums (1996–1998)
- John Manti – drums (1995–1996)
- Andrea "Attila" Caniato – guitar (2009–2011)
- Gabriel Pignata – bass (2009–2011)

== Discography ==
=== Studio albums ===
- Technical Crime (Lucretia Records, 1997—remastered, Scarlet, 2004)
- Sweatshops (Scarlet, 2002)
- Das Kapital (Scarlet, 2004)
- As God Kills (Massacre Records, 2006)
- In the End Everything Is a Gag (Scarlet, 2010)
- Cowards Empire (2016)

=== EPs ===
- Ask (Lucretia Records, 1995—remastered, Scarlet, 2004)
- Sterilized (Lucretia Records, 2000)

=== Demos ===
- Grind Revolution in Mass Evolution (self-produced, 1994)
- Land of Nod (self-produced, 2000)
