= Furor Gallico =

Celtic folk metal band of Italy

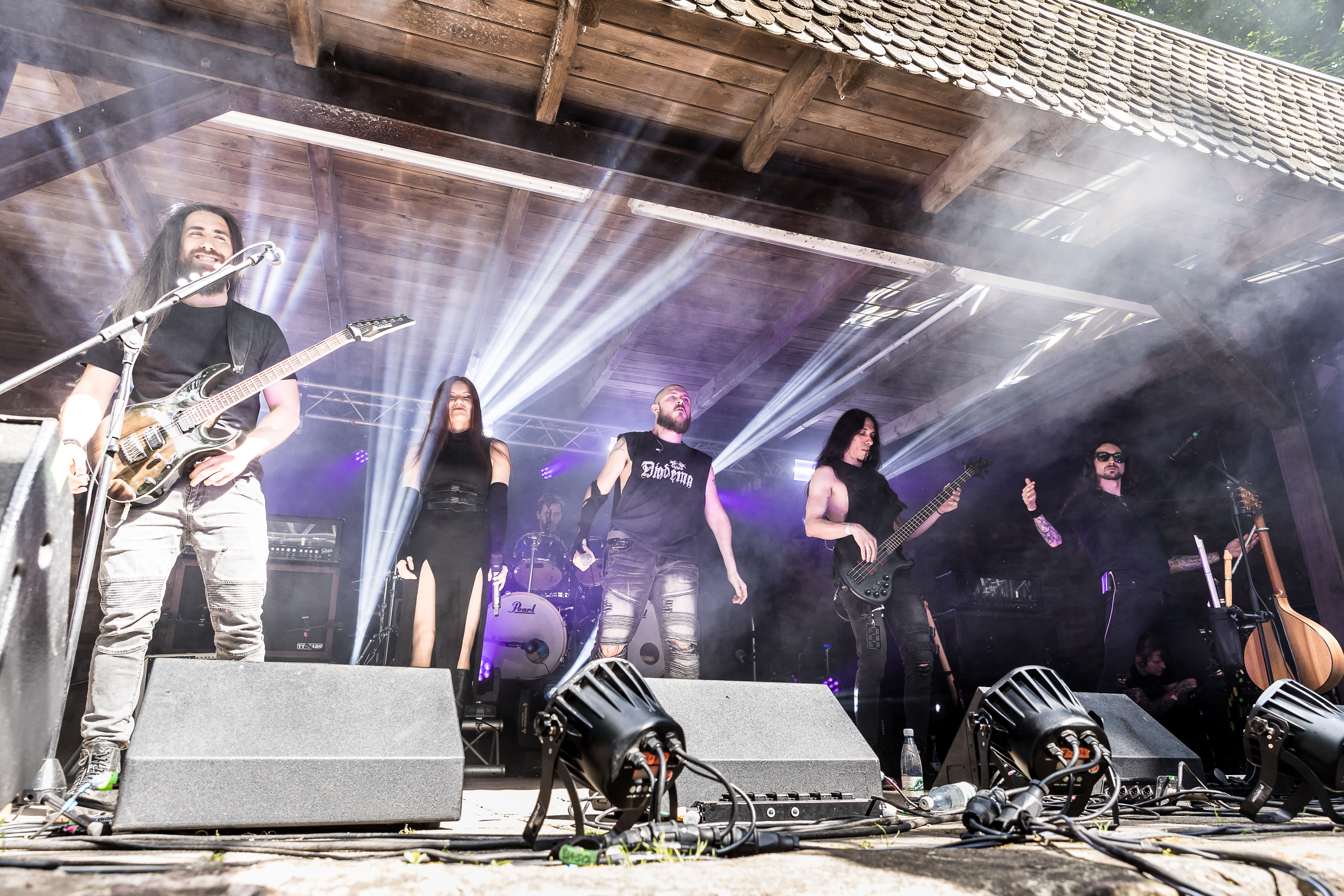
- Furor Gallico at the Dark Troll Festival 2025 in Germany.

Background information
- Origin: Milan, Italy
- Genres: Celtic metal Pagan metal Folk metal
- Years active: 2007–present
- Labels: Massacre, Scarlet
- Members: Davide Cicalese (Pagan)- Vocals; Gabriel Consiglio - Guitar, Backing Vocals; Oldhan- Guitar; Fabio- Bass; Simone Sgarella (Simo)- Drums; Riccardo Brumat (Riky)- Violin; Elisabetta Rossi (Becky)- Celtic Harp; Paolo- tin/low whistle, bouzouki Mirko Fustinoni- drums
- Past members: Melissa Milani (Mela) (2007-2008)- Bass; Marco Boyer (2007-2009)- Drums; Maurizio Cardullo (Merogaisus)- tin/low whistle, bouzouki (2007-2010); Mac (2008-2011)- Bass

Furor Gallico is an Italian Celtic metal and pagan metal band that had originated in Milan, Italy. The band was formed by a collaboration among Melissa (past member, bass), Stefano (guitar) and Becky (Celtic harp) in 2007. The band was formed upon the idea of playing new school Italian folk metal. They have released one demo album and four full-length album so far. Pagan was later added for vocals and Marco played the drums. Furor Gallico have songs in both English and in Italian, the band members take alternating roles in who writes the lyrics and composes the music in either language. The song Curmisagios was even written in dialetto brianzolo, a lombard dialect spoken in the area of Brianza, in western Lombardy. They make use of different types of vocals (growl, scream and clean vocals) combined with folk instruments such as Celtic harp, whistles, violin and bouzouki.

== Etymology ==
Furor Gallico is the description that the ancient Romans had given to the state of blood lust that the Celtic Warriors, who were ready to attack in battle to defend their people and their land, had possessed. They claim that they are the bards who live to pass on the legends of the now lost Celtic Worlds.

== History ==
The band formed in 2007 by Melissa (past member bass), Stefano (guitar) and Becky (Celtic harp). Pagan was added for vocals and Marco for the drums. The Celtic band did not feel complete and ready to make music until they invited Laura to play the violin and Oldhan to play as a second electric guitarist. The band then immediately started to play many live performances, and later on they met the multi-instrumentalist Merogaisus who added whistles, bouzouki and occasionally the bagpipes. In 2008, their first demo 390 b.c. - The Glorious Dawn was recorded. Shortly after this release, Melissa had decided to leave the band for her own personal projects. This is when Mac had taken her position as bassist. The band started to grow to a very professional level. In 2009, Marco was forced to leave due to commitments to his university which led Simone to take control of the band. The band then started to record their first full-length album which was self-titled. The album was self-produced and distributed but had success despite that. Furor Gallico is a brutal Celtic/folk metal album, where growls, and power guitars are alternated with melodics harps, violin and whistles.

In 2009/2010, they composed music for the opera "Hamlet" on multiple stages in Northern Italy, including at the Teatro Coccia of Novara. In 2015 the band released their second album, Songs From The Earth, for Scarlet Records. Sword Chant, upon hearing their CD, reviewed them as the so-called Revelation of the Year.

== Discography ==
- 390 b.c. - The Glorious Dawn (2008, demo)
- Furor Gallico (2010)
- Songs from the Earth (2015)
- Dusk of the Ages (2019)
- Future to Come (2024)
