= Kayser (band) =

Swedish thrash metal band

- Origin: Helsingborg, Sweden
- Genres: Thrash metal, groove metal
- Years active: 2004–present
- Labels: Listenable, Scarlet
- Members: Spice; Swaney; Jokke; Biff; Bob Ruben
- Website: kaysertheband.com

Kayser is a Swedish thrash metal band from Helsingborg.

== Musical style ==
The band describes its style as a mix of Black Sabbath, Megadeth and Slayer. While the first album, Kaiserhof, was a pure thrash metal album, Frame the World… Hang It on the Wall features some rock influences influenced by Christian "Spice" Sjöstrand's predecessor band Spiritual Beggars. Metal.de called Kayser a thrash/groove metal band.

== Members ==
=== Current members ===
- Spice – vocals
- Swaney – guitar
- Jokke – guitar
- Biff – bass
- Bob Ruben – drums

=== Former members ===
- Fredrik Finnander – guitar (2004–2005)
- Mattias Nilsson – guitar
- Anders Wenander – bass

== Discography ==
=== Studio albums ===
- Kaiserhof (2005)
- Frame the World… Hang It on the Wall (2006)
- Read Your Enemy (2014)
- IV: Beyond the Reef of Sanity (2016)

=== EPs ===
- The Good Citizen EP (2006)
