= Black as Pitch =

Studio album by Necrodeath
- Released: November 27, 2001
- Genre: Extreme metal
- Length: 39:00
- Label: Scarlet Records

Necrodeath chronology
Mater of All Evil (1999)	Black as Pitch (2001)	Ton(e)s of Hate (2003)

Professional ratings
Review scores
Source	Rating
Allmusic	2.5/5 stars
Chronicles of Chaos	9.5/10
Metalitalia.com	7.5/10
Rock Hard	8.5/10
Vampster	Favourable

Black as Pitch is the fourth studio album of the Italian extreme metal band Necrodeath.

== Track listing ==
All tracks by Necrodeath

1. "Red as Blood" - 3:57
2. "Riot of Stars" - 2:46
3. "Burn and Deny" - 2:55
4. "Mortal Consequence" - 2:55
5. "Sacrifice 2K1" - 3:34
6. "Process of Violation" - 3:19
7. "Anagaton" - 2:43
8. "Killing Time" - 2:19
9. "Saviors of Hate" - 3:24
10. "Join the Pain" - 2:48
11. "Church's Black Book" - 8:07

== Personnel ==
- Flegias – vocals
- Peso – drums
- Claudio – guitars
- John – bass
