= Draculea (album) =

Studio album by Necrodeath
- Released: October 22, 2007
- Studios: Outer Sound (Rome), MusicArt (Genova)
- Genre: Extreme metal
- Label: Scarlet Records

Necrodeath chronology
100% Hell (2006)	Draculea (2007)	Phylogenesis (2009)

Professional ratings
Review scores
Source	Rating
Rock Hard	7/10
Metal.de	6/10
Vampster	Unfavourable

Draculea is the seventh album by Italian extreme metal band Necrodeath, released in October 2007 by Scarlet Records.

== Track listing ==
1. "V.T.1431" (Ana, Peso, Pier) – 4:23
2. "Smell Of Blood" (Peso) – 4:54
3. "Party In Tirgoviste" (Peso) – 5:44
4. "Draculea" (Peso) – 5:45
5. "Fragments Of Insanity " (Claudio, Ingo, Peso) – 4:39
6. "Countess Bathory (Venom cover)" (Jeff Dunn, Conrad Lant) – 3:09
7. "The Golden Cup" (Peso) – 6:02
8. "Impaler Prince" (Peso, Pier) – 6:37
9. "V.T.1476" (Ana, Peso, Pier) – 6:27

== Personnel ==
- Flegias – vocals
- Peso – drums
- Pier Gonella – guitar
- John – bass
