= Dragonhammer =

Italian power metal band

Dragonhammer is an Italian power metal band. They among others released one album on Scarlet Records, 2004's Time for Expiation.

== Discography ==
- The Blood of the Dragon (2001)
- Time for Expiation (2004)
- The X Experiment (2013)
- Obscurity (2017)
- Second Life (2022)
