= Furor Gallico (album) =

Studio album by Furor Gallico
- Released: June 2010
- Genre: Pagan metal Celtic metal
- Length: 58:05
- Label: Massacre Records

Furor Gallico chronology
390 b.c. - The Glorious Dawn (2008)	Furor Gallico (2010)	Songs from the Earth (2015)

Furor Gallico is the first full-studio album by the Italian heavy/folk metal band Furor Gallico. The album was released in June 2010 in Milan, Italy.

== Track listing ==
Furor Gallico consists of the following tracks:

No.	Title	Writer(s)	Length
1.	"Intro"	Merogaisus	2:00
2.	"Venti di Imbolc"	Pagan, Ste, Laura	4:23
3.	"Ancient Rites"	Marco, Ste	3:24
4.	"Cathubodva"	Mela, Ste	6:29
5.	"The Gods Have Returned"	Becky	4:13
6.	"Golden Spiral"	Laura, Becky	2:35
7.	"Curmisagios"	Becky, Mela	1:57
8.	"The Miraculous Child"	Pagan, Ste	6:18
9.	"Medhelan"	Becky, Oldhan	6:32
10.	"Bright Eyes"	Merogaisus	2:18
11.	"La Caccia Morta"	Becky, Pagan	4:49
12.	"Banshee"	Becky, Merogaisus	5:06
13.	"The Glorious Dawn"		8:01
Total length:			58:05

- Songs in Italian
  - Venti di Imbolc
  - Curmisagios (Western Lombard)
  - Medhelan
  - La Caccia Morta
- Songs in English
  - Ancient Rites
  - Cathubodva
  - The Gods Have Returned
  - The Miraculous Child
  - Banshee
  - The Glorious Dawn
- Instrumental Songs
  - Intro
  - Golden Spiral
  - Bright Eyes
