= 390 b.c. - The Glorious Dawn =

The Glorious Dawn

Studio album by Furor Gallico
- Released: December 2008
- Genre: Folk metal, heavy metal, Celtic metal
- Length: 21:50
- Label: Massacre Records

Furor Gallico chronology
The Glorious Dawn (2008)	Furor Gallico (2010)

390 b.c. - The Glorious Dawn is the first demo by the Italian heavy/folk metal band Furor Gallico. The album was released in December 2008 in Milan, Italy.

== Track listing ==
Furor Gallico consists of the following tracks:

No.	Title	Writer(s)	Length
1.	"The Gods Have Returned"	Becky	4:03
2.	"La Caccia Morta"	Becky, Pagan	4:54
3.	"Cathubodva"	Mela, Ste	6:25
4.	"Medhelan"	Becky, Oldhan	6:28
Total length:			21:50

- Songs in Italian
  - La Caccia Morta
  - Medhelan
- Songs in English
  - The Gods Have Returned
  - Cathubodva
