= Elettra Storm =

Italian metal band

Elettra Storm is an Italian power metal band. They have released two albums, both on Scarlet Records.

The band was founded by Davide Sportiello of Sinheresy and SilentLie, as he could not tour or perform with his current bands during COVID-19. He recruited guitarist Matteo Antoni and drummer Matteo Norbedo, who lived nearby and whom he had seen play live. Vocalists Francis D. Mary and Crystal Laura Emiliani came from another part of Italy.

== Discography ==
- Powerlords (2024)
- Evertale (2025)
