= On Fire (Mastercastle album) =

Studio album by Mastercastle
- Released: 19 April 2013
- Recorded: March 2012 – December 2012, at MusicArt Studios, Genoa, Italy
- Genres: Neoclassical metal, hard rock
- Length: 39:05
- Label: Lion Music
- Producer: Pier Gonella

Mastercastle chronology
Dangerous Diamonds (2011)	On Fire (2013)	Enfer (De La Bibliothèque Nationale)

On Fire is the fourth album of the Italian heavy metal band Mastercastle. The lyrics of the album tell about "metals". The instrumental track "The Final Battle" is a cover of the composer Chris Hülsbeck, and the other instrumental "Almost a Fantasy" is a rock remake of the famous Piano Sonata No. 14 in C-sharp minor "Quasi una fantasia", Op. 27, known as the Moonlight Sonata, written by Ludwig van Beethoven

== History ==
The album was recorded starting from March 2012 and was finished in December 2012. It was recorded by Pier Gonella and mixed by Pier Gonella and John Macaluso at MusicArt studios.

== Lyrics ==
"Once again all lyrics were composed by Giorgia Gueglio, "I started the lyrics with the intention of writing a concept album with the title "Metals", concerning metals in metallurgy, chemistry, alchemy and magic. But during their creation I found my lyrics full of sentiments, suffering and emotions. So "Metals" became too cold. Many tracks have a title with a metal within, but these are "warmed" by blood, my/our human warmth, the passion of making music in a difficult world. So the album title was changed to "On Fire". 'O Fire' is a hot work, very human. On the front cover (also created by Giorgia) you can see a metal hearth. It represents our body that became real and can be hot or burn thanks to our emotions".".

Professional ratings
Review scores
Source	Rating
*Dangerdog Music Reviews	5/5 stars
*Sea of tranquillity	4/5 stars
*Firebrand Magazine	10/10 stars

== Track listing ==
No.	Title	Writer(s)	Length
1.	"Silver Eyes"	Mastercastle	4:10
2.	"Chains"	Mastercastle	4:55
3.	"Platinum"	Mastercastle	4:20
4.	"Quicksilver"	Mastercastle	3:30
5.	"Gold Violet"	Mastercastle	4:46
6.	"The Final Battle"	Chris Hülsbeck	4:17
7.	"Leaden Roads"	Mastercastle	4:40
8.	"Titanium Wings"	Mastercastle	4:13
9.	"Almost a Fantasy"	Ludwig van Beethoven	3:59

== Line up ==
- Giorgia Gueglio – voice
- Pier Gonella – guitars
- Steve Vawamas – bass
- John Macaluso – drums
