= Strategy (Pier Gonella album) =

Studio album by Pier Gonella
- Released: 7 January 2020
- Recorded: August 2018 – September 2019, at MusicArt Studios, Genoa, Italy
- Genre: hard rock, rock
- Length: 43:28
- Label: MusicArt / Diamonds Prod
- Producer: Pier Gonella

Pier Gonella chronology
Strategy (2020)	667 (2023)

Professional ratings
Review scores
Source	Rating
*Metalhead	8.5/10 stars
*Metalhammer	7.4/10 stars

Strategy is the first album by the Italian heavy metal guitar player Pier Gonella. It contains nine instrumental tracks, released under MusicArt/Diamonds Prod Rec.

== History ==
The album was recorded by Pier Gonella himself, who also handled mixing and mastering.

It contains 9 instrumental tracks and the genre is American instrumental hard rock from the 90s, heavily inspired by Joe Satriani, as Gonella himself stated in a recent interview: "Certainly Joe Satriani has been a great influence, not only as a soloist but also as a composer for his ability to create instrumental rock that is enjoyable for non-musicians". Two singles, "Strategy" and "Liberland", have been released from the album.

Overall, the album has received very positive reviews, particularly for the fact that it is a collection of melodic songs and not a self-congratulatory technical album. For example, the webzine "Loud and Proud" says Pier Gonella moves with elegance, focusing on pleasant melodies, serving technique to the song rather than the other way around, and never accelerating too much on wild shredding.

== Track listing ==
No.	Title	Writer(s)	Length
1.	"Strategy"	Gonella	3:35
2.	"Rocks n Roll"	Gonella	4:54
3.	"The Pied Piper"	Gonella	4:25
4.	"Liberland"	Gonella	4:14
5.	"La Graciosa"	Gonella	5:06
6.	"The Spark Of Life"	Gonella	4:33
7.	"Devil At God’s Pub"	Gonella	3:52
8.	"Crazy Numbers"	Gonella	3:49
9.	"To The Next Party"	Gonella	5:24

== Personnel ==
- Pier Gonella – guitars
- Giulio Belzer – bass
- Marco 'Peso' Pesenti – drums
