= Moonlight Haze =

Italian symphonic power metal band

- Origin: Italy
- Genres: Symphonic power metal
- Years active: 2018–present
- Label: Scarlet Records
- Members: Chiara Tricarico; Giulio Capone; Marco Falanga; Alberto Melinato; Alessandro Jacobi
- Website: https://www.moonlighthaze.com/

Moonlight Haze is an Italian symphonic power metal band formed in 2018 by vocalist Chiara Tricarico, and drummer Giulio Capone, both who are former members of Temperance. The band has released four albums and an EP.

== Band members ==
=== Current ===
- Chiara Tricarico – vocals
- Giulio Capone – drums, keyboards
- Marco Falanga – guitars
- Alberto Melinato – guitars
- Alessandro Jacobi – bass

=== Live ===
- Luca Setti – drums (2024–present)

== Discography ==
Studio albums:

- De Rerum Natura (2019)
- Lunaris (2020)
- Animus (2022)
- Beyond (2025)

EPs

- Interstellar Madness (2026)
