= Labyrinth (band) =

Italian power metal band

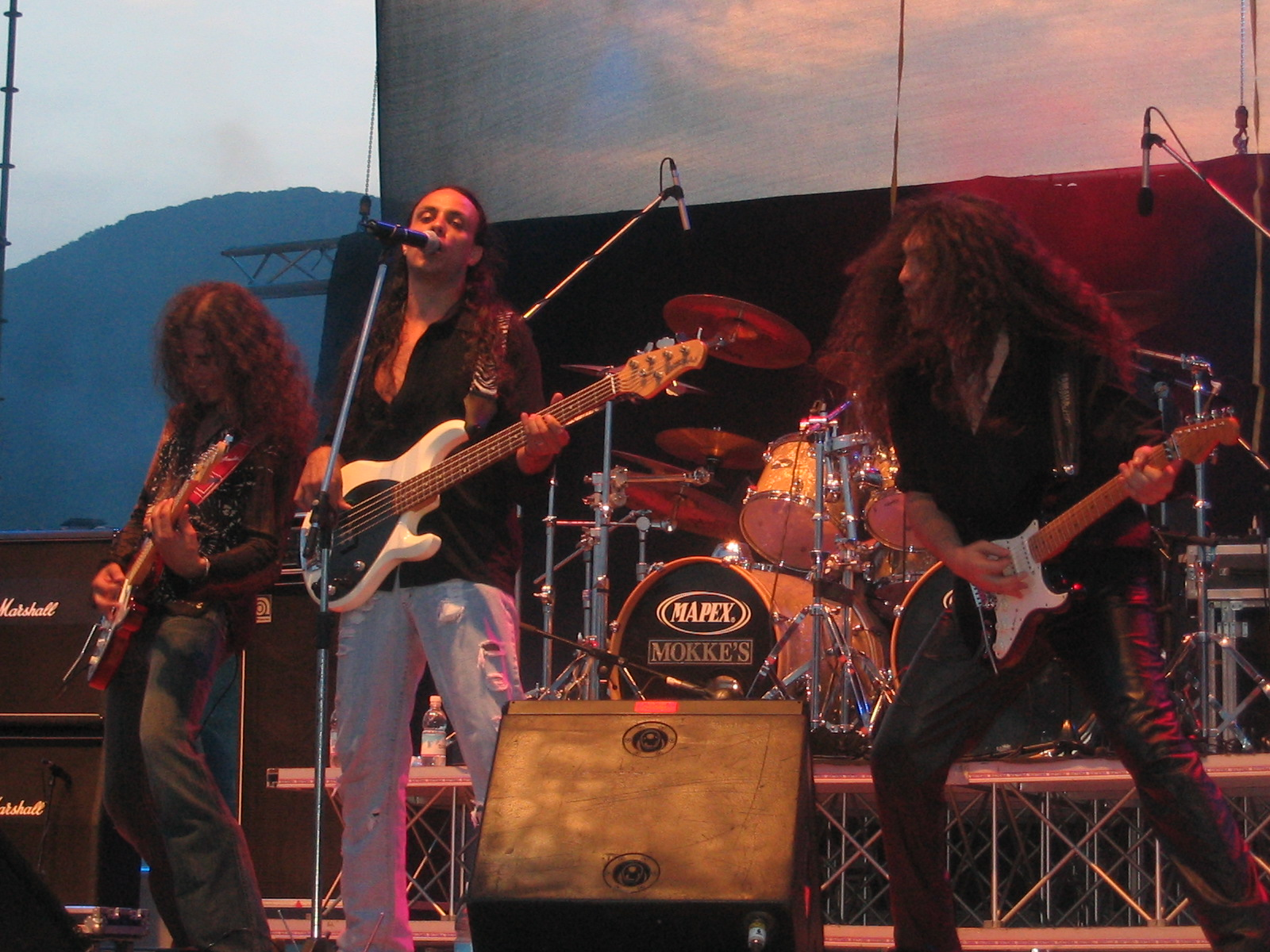
- Labyrinth performing at Evolution Festival 2006

Background information
- Origin: Massa, Italy
- Genres: Power metal, progressive metal
- Years active: 1994–present
- Labels: Underground Symphony, Metal Blade, Century Media, Arise, Scarlet, Frontiers, Scarlet, Encore
- Members: Andrea Cantarelli; Olaf Thörsen; Roberto Tiranti; Oleg Smirnoff; John Macaluso; Nik Mazzucconi
- Past members: Fabio Lione; Franco Rubulotta; Luca Contini; Andrea Bartoletti; Cristiano Bertocchi; Andrea de Paoli; Mattia Stancioiu; Pier Gonella; Alessandro Bissa; Sergio Pagnacco
- Website: labyrinthband.com

Labyrinth is an Italian power metal and progressive metal band formed in 1994 in Massa, Tuscany. The band underwent a change in style and themes after the departure of Olaf Thorsen in 2002. Olaf Thorsen came back in 2009.

== History ==
=== 1990s ===
Labyrinth formed in 1994 with a lineup of Franco Rubulotta (Frank Andiver-drums), Luca Contini (Ken Taylor-keyboards), Andrea Bartoletti (bass guitar), Andrea Cantarelli (Anders Rain-lead guitar), Carlo Andrea Magnani (Olaf Thorsen-lead guitar), Fabio Tordiglione (Joe Terry-vocals).

The band released their first demo "Midnight Resistance". The demo got enthusiastic reviews in major metal magazines in Italy and Germany and that gave them the chance to sign with Underground Symphony, a new indie record label. Andrea Bartoletti left the band and was replaced by Chris Breeze (Cristiano Bertocchi). "Piece of Time", their first EP, marked the direction the band was taking: pure melodic speed metal with a keyboards-background.

In 1995, "No Limits" was released and the interest in the band grew among metal fans and independent labels. The popularity of the band increased not only in the Italy and in Europe, but also overseas where some labels (Teichiku Records in Japan) offered to distribute the album. The band was in the metal magazine Burrn!'s top ten charts for almost six months. Joe Terry (Fabio Tordiglione) left the band and later became the frontman with Rhapsody of Fire.

In 1997, Frank Andiver (Franco Rubulotta) and Ken Taylor (Luca Contini) left the band (however they took part in the composing of "Return to Heaven Denied"); and Rob Tyrant (Roberto Tiranti), Mat Stancioiu (Mattia Stancioiu) and Andrew McPauls (Andrea De Paoli) were brought in as their replacements. All the while, some of the big metal labels showed an interest on the band's new demo and finally Metal Blade Records made an offer and the band joined the label. It took six months to record the second album Return to Heaven Denied and before its release the band took part in that summer's metal main event: "Gods of Metal", together with some of heavy metal's biggest acts such as Black Sabbath, Pantera, Helloween, Blind Guardian, etc. Return To Heaven Denied was a success among fans and metal magazines alike, and it gave a strong push not only to the career of the band, but also to the Italian metal scene as a whole.

Shortly after the release of the new record the singer Rob Tyrant left the band, replaced by Morby from Domine who was with Labyrinth throughout the whole European tour as supporting act with Pegazus of the most popular bands HammerFall and Primal Fear. After a few months, it followed an Italian tour with Heimdall. Then, Rob Tyrant returned to the band. After a short break the band entered the recording studio to release the new Mini CD Timeless Crime, containing new and old tracks from the first demotape Midnight Resistance to LPs No Limits and Return to Heaven Denied.

=== 2000s ===
After these festivals, the band entered the recording studio again to release the new full-length album Sons Of Thunder. As a showcase for the new album, the band played at important European festivals, like WACKEN 2000 and Rock Machina 2000 in Spain. At the end of August 2000, Sons Of Thunder went to No. 52 on the Japanese charts and at No. 26 on the Italian charts. The band then toured South America with Vision Divine.

The band organized an Italian tour first, in February 2001, with supporting band Sigma (ex Love Machine), and then a European tour, supporting Helloween first and then with Nocturnal Rites supporting Iron Savior.

The band organized, in March 2002, a tour called "Italian Attack". A festival in which Domine, White Skull, Skylark, Novembre, and Centurion appeared. Their participation in these tours help raise the popularity of Labyrinth. In May of that year, the band began writing new material.

In the meantime, Olaf Thorsen left the band to join Vision Divine, whereas Mat Stancioiu and Andrew McPauls left Vision Divine to dedicate all their attention to Labyrinth. In July the first demo of the new Labyrinth album appeared. For the first time, the members decided to use their Italian names: Andrea Cantarelli, Roberto Tiranti, Andrea De Paoli, Cristiano Bertocchi, and Mattia Stancioiu.

The quality of the demo enabled them to sign three of the most important deals of their career: Century Media Records for Europe and Americas, V2 for Italy and King Records for Japan.

In January, Labyrinth began recording the new self-titled album, with the band self-producing again. It was recorded at the Noise Factory in Milan, Italy, and it was mastered at House of Audio in Germany.

On 24 April 2003 Labyrinth signed a record deal with Century Media Records. The release date for their next album was set for 30 June 2003. The release of Labyrinth originally set for 30 June, was postponed in Italy to 4 July.

On 9 August 2003, Labyrinth performed at the 9th Agglutination Metal Festival in Chiaromonte, Italy. Other bands set to appear at the event included Vader, Virgin Steele and Elvenking.

Roberto Tiranti took part in the musical "The Ten Commandments" until the beginning of the year 2004.

The next step was finding another good guitarist for the live dates. The band found in Pier Gonella, Roberto and Andrea De Paoli. The first show with Pier was the IX Agglutination Metal Festival in Chiaromonte (PZ), where Labyrinth would have been the third band, before Vader and Virgin Steele.

After the summer, the band began preparations for the live shows to support the new album. It was a tour out of the usual standard, without an estimated end: The Maze On Tour 2003/2004. From December 2003, with the tour, also began the work on the new album foreseen for Fall 2004, during which the band celebrated 10 years together. The new work was a prosecution of the way begun with Labyrinth, with songs of deep atmosphere and tracks like "Just Soldier", but with a deeper introspection. Taking part with good and dense ideas to the writing of the new tracks, Pier Gonella with the beginning of 2004 joined the band as sixth official member. Also in December, Rob Tyrant (Roberto Trianti) recorded guest vocals on the rock opera "Genius 'Episode II'" along with people such as Eric Martin (formerly of Mr. Big), Russell Allen (from Symphony X), Jeff Martin (of Racer X), Mark Boals (formerly of Yngwie Malmsteen), Daniel Gildenlöw (of Pain of Salvation), Liv Kristine (formerly of Theatre of Tragedy), and Edu Falaschi (of Angra).

Labyrinth put the band to work one more time, with big support of Century Media, in Japan good sales with King Records and then in the month of May a tour in Asia called "Banzai Tour" in Tokyo and Osaka, Japan, Taipei, Taichung, Taiwan, and Beijing, China and also Hong Kong.

After some shows in Italy, Labyrinth played in Slovakia at More Than Festival 2004 with bands like Lost Horizons, Destruction, and Freedom Call.

On 9 December 2004, they performed a show in London at Underworld Cadmen together with Dream Evil. One week later Labyrinth signed a deal with the label Arise records.

With Freeman, there was a new look with strength-jackets and more wish of freedom in the lyrics; both for Italian and Japanese releases, there is a normal version and one with a bonus DVD.

On 22 February 2005, Labyrinth announced the dates of an Italian tour in support of their upcoming album, Freeman. The tour would consist of, seven total shows, ranging from 25 March 2005 through and including 16 April 2005. The follow-up to 2003's Labyrinth, Freeman was recorded at Elnor Studios and scheduled for release on 4 March 2005 by Arise Records. Freeman was released in March 2005, in which the band showed more aggressive riffs and melodic parts at the same time. The album, was released in 2005 through Arise Records. The Italian version of the album contained the exclusive bonus DVD with a Tokyo show (Banzai Tour 2004), "best of" London Cadmen Underworld (from 13 November 2004), the "L.Y.A.F.H." and "Freeman" videos, pictures and discography.

Later that month on 21 March 2005, Headrush, an Italian hard rock band featuring ex-Dokken guitarist Alex De Rosso and Labyrinth singer Roberto Tiranti, released their debut album in Europe via Frontiers Records (and in Japan via King Records). Also, in March 2005 singer Roberto Tiranti appeared on Secret Sphere album "Heart & Anger".

That summer after the Lorca Rock Festival, Labyrinth played a tour in Italy (a total of 17 shows) and supported Dream Theater and Angra in Italy for three shows ( 21–23 June), in Italy (21 June 2005 in Florence, on 22 June 2005 in Ascoli Piceno, and on 23 June in Padua) with Angra. Later, on 14 August 2005, Labyrinth took part in the Metalway Festival in Gernika-Bilbao with bands like Manowar, Saxon, Accept, Motörhead, W.A.S.P. and more.

2006 started with bad news, Cristiano Bertocchi left the band, to pursue a solo career. After few days of Mattia suggested Roberto to become the new bass player. They played only two shows with this new line up, one at Mesiano in Trento and another at the Evolution Festival, then spent the rest of the year writing and recording 6 Days to Nowhere.

In December Heraldry released their album Delirium, which featured guest vocals by Roberto Tiranti.

In late 2006, Labyrinth signed a record deal with Scarlet Records, to release 6 Days to Nowhere. Between 26 February, and 9 March, the album 6 Days To Nowhere was released worldwide. The album's mastering took place at the famous Abbey Road Studios in London. Following the album's release the band announced a tour of Europe (only one date in Sweden and the rest in Italy) and Japan, between 27 October 2007 and 2 March 2008.

On 3 November 2007 Labyrinth appeared at the Växjö Metal Festival III, in Växjö, Sweden. Also scheduled to appear were Jorn, Grave, Heed, Bloodbound, Engel and Pagan's Mind, among others.

Pier Gonella handled the guitar duties, on the Necrodeath album "Draculea" While Pier performed on that album, Roberto Tiranti appeared on Ranfa's album Little Hard Blues. Tiranti appeared on the album's fifth track entitled "It Will Be Not This Blues".

On 22 January 2008, it was announced that Andrea De Paoli would be making a guest appearance on the debut album of Expedition Delta, which is being released by ProgRock Records.
In summer 2008 Pier Gonella left the band to dedicate himself totally to Necrodeath and his new heavy metal band Mastercastle.

On 11 September 2009 Olaf reunited with Labyrinth to record Return to Heaven Denied Pt. II: "A Midnight Autumn's Dream", a follower of their successful album from 1998. In October 2009 was also announced the new bassist Sergio Pagnacco (with courtesy of Vanexa historical Italian metal band)). Also, drummer Mattia Stancioiu left the band to be a full-time sound engineer and producer and be a part-time drummer.

=== 2010s ===
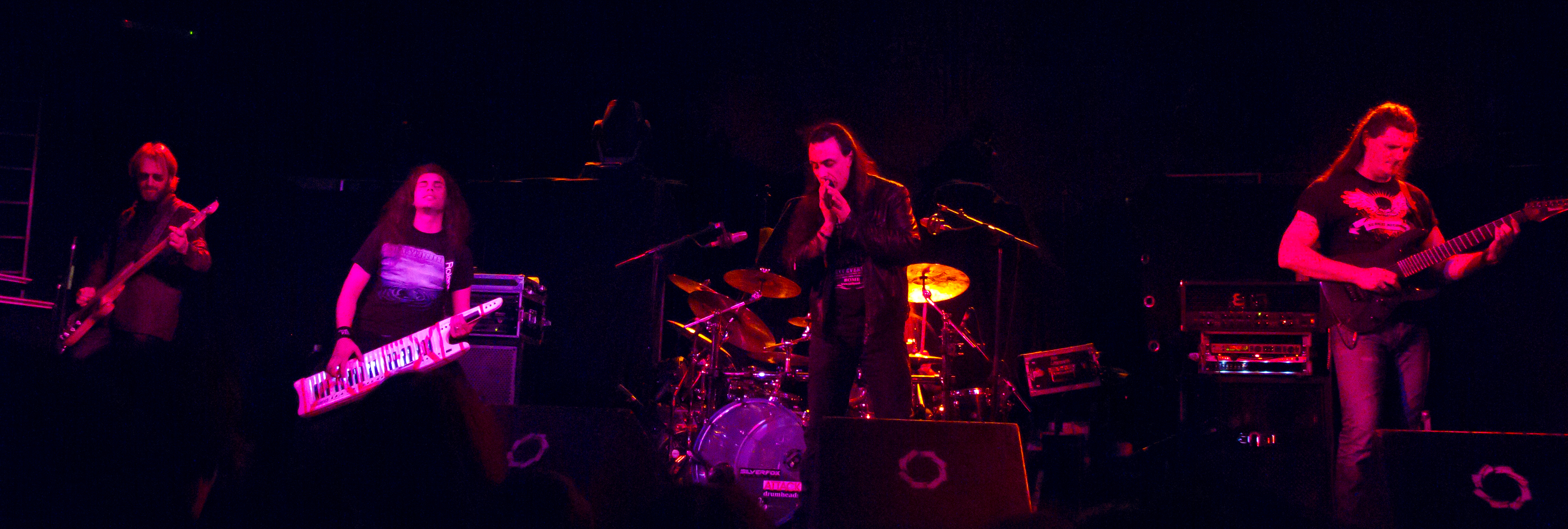
Labyrinth performing in 2011

In 2011 they toured with Sonata Arctica.

In 2014, Roberto Tiranti announced that he was leaving the band to embark on a solo career, but the new announced vocalist Mark Boals never joined the band.

In 2016, the band announced they are working on a new album which is planned for release with record company Frontiers Music Srl in 2017. It was also announced the band's line-up reunion of founding members Olaf Thorsen and Andrea Cantarelli on guitars with Roberto Tiranti on lead vocals, along with John Macaluso (former Ark, Yngwie Malmsteen, James LaBrie, Riot, Starbreaker, and TNT) on drums, Oleg Smirnoff (former Vision Divine, Eldritch, Death SS) on keyboards and Nik Mazzucconi on bass. In February 2017, the album' title (Architecture of a God), track-list and cover were revealed. In 2019, the drummer Matt Peruzzi joined the band.

In January 2021, they released their ninth studio album, Welcome to the Absurd Circus.

In January 2025, they released their tenth studio album, In the Vanishing Echoes of Goodbye.

== Members ==
=== Current ===
- Andrea Cantarelli (Anders Rain) – guitar (1994–present)
- Carlo Andrea Magnani (Olaf Thorsen) – guitar (1994–2002, 2009–present)
- Roberto Tiranti (Rob Tyrant) – vocals (1997–2014, 2016–present), bass (2006–2010)
- Nik Mazzucconi – bass (2016–present)
- Matt Peruzzi – drum (2019–present)
- Oleg Smirnoff – keyboard, electric piano, solo (2016–present)

=== Former ===
- Fabio Tordiglione (Fabio Lione) – lead vocals (1994–1996)
- Franco Rubulotta (Frank Andiver) – drums (1994–1996)
- Luca Contini (Ken Taylor) – keyboards (1994–1996)
- Andrea Bartoletti – bass (1994–1995)
- Cristiano Bertocchi (Chris Breeze) – bass (1995–2006)
- Andrea De Paoli (Andrew McPauls) – keyboards (1997–2016)
- Mattia Stancioiu (Mat Stancioiu) – drums (1997–2009)
- Pier Gonella – guitar (2003–2008)
- Alessandro Bissa – drums (2010–2016)
- Sergio Pagnacco – bass (2010–2016)
- John Macaluso – drums (2016–2019)

== Discography ==
=== EP ===
- Midnight Resistance (1994)
- Piece of Time (1995)
- Timeless Crime (1999)

=== Studio albums ===
- No Limits (1996)
- Return to Heaven Denied (1998)
- Sons of Thunder (2000)
- Labyrinth (2003)
- Freeman (2005)
- 6 Days to Nowhere (2007)
- Return to Heaven Denied Pt. II: "A Midnight Autumn's Dream" (2010)
- Architecture of a God (2017)
- Welcome to the Absurd Circus (2021)
- In the Vanishing Echoes of Goodbye (2025)

=== Other albums/collaborations ===
- Metal for the Masses Volume II (Disc 2) (2003)
- As Time Goes By... (2011)
- Return to Live (2018) – live album with DVD
