= Freeman (Labyrinth album) =

Studio album by Labyrinth
- Released: March 4, 2005
- Genre: Progressive metal, power metal
- Label: Arise Records

Labyrinth chronology
Labyrinth (2003)	Freeman (2005)	6 Days to Nowhere (2007)

Professional ratings
Review scores
Source	Rating
Rock Hard	8.5/10
Powermetal.de	8/10

Freeman is Labyrinth's fifth album, released March 4, 2005 on Arise Records.

== Track listing ==
1. "L.Y.A.F.H."* - 4:26
2. "Deserter" - 5:03
3. "Dive in Open Waters" - 3:10
4. "Freeman" - 4:16
5. "M3"** - 4:10
6. "Face and Pay" - 5:27
7. "Malcolm Grey" - 6:02
8. "Nothing New" - 5:03
9. "Infidels" - 5:55
10. "Meanings" - 3:56

_{* Stands for "Light Years Away From Here".}
_{** Is a reference to the BMW M3 sports car.}
