= Architecture of a God =

Studio album by Labyrinth
- Released: 21 April 2017
- Genre: Power metal, progressive metal
- Length: 61:07
- Label: Frontiers
- Producer: Labyrinth

Labyrinth chronology
Return to Heaven Denied Pt. II: "A Midnight Autumn's Dream" (2010)	Architecture of a God (2017)	Welcome to the Absurd Circus (2021)

Architecture of a God is the eighth album by Italian power metal band Labyrinth, released on 21 April 2017 via Frontiers Records. It is their first album since 2010's Return to Heaven Denied Pt. II: "A Midnight Autumn's Dream", marking their longest non-album gap.

== Background ==
In 2014, lead vocalist Roberto Tiranti left Labyrinth to embark on a solo career, and Mark Boals was chosen as his replacement. In 2016, however, the band announced they were working on a new album to be released via Frontiers Music Srl in 2017 and to be recorded with the reunion of founding members Olaf Thorsen and Andrea Cantarelli on guitars, with Tiranti on lead vocals, John Macaluso (ex-Ark, Yngwie Malmsteen, James LaBrie, Riot, Starbreaker, and TNT) on drums, Oleg Smirnoff (ex-Vision Divine, Eldritch, Death SS) on keyboards and Nik Mazzucconi on bass.

The reunion was suggested by the label, which called Cantarelli and Thorsen and insisted they worked back together in order to revisit their "classic sound". Thorsen was reluctant at first, but ended up accepting the invitation.

In February 2017, the album's title, track-list and cover were revealed.

== Critical reception ==
Professional ratings
Review scores
Source	Rating
Metal Hammer Italia	90/100
Metal Hammer (Germany)	3/7
Rock Hard	7/10
Powermetal.de	8/10

Writing for Metal Hammer Italia, Stefano Giorgianni recognized the band is not the same as before, but still praised the overall performance, including that of new members Mazzucconi, Smirnoff and Macaluso, and said the band writes "poetry transposed to music, with compositions that transcend genres and directly reach one's heart".

Writing for the German edition of the magazine, Katrin Riedl wasn't as impressed, comparing it unfavorably to the band's previous effort, which she believed to have had more power and more progressive elements blended in their power metal.

== Track listing ==
Architecture of a God track listing
No.	Title	Length
1.	"Bullets"	6:56
2.	"Still Alive"	4:49
3.	"Take on My Legacy"	4:04
4.	"A New Dream"	5:22
5.	"Someone Says"	4:44
6.	"Random Logic"	1:55
7.	"Architecture of a God"	8:40
8.	"Children (Robert Miles cover)"	4:07
9.	"Those Days"	5:14
10.	"We Belong to Yesterday"	6:32
11.	"Stardust and Ashes"	5:16
12.	"Diamond"	3:28
Total length:		61:07

== Personnel ==
- Roberto Tiranti — vocals
- Andrea Cantarelli — guitars
- Olaf Thörsen — guitars
- Nik Mazzucconi — bass
- Oleg Smirnoff — keyboards
- John Macaluso — drums
- Simone Mularoni — mixing
