= Labyrinth (Labyrinth album) =

Studio album by Labyrinth
- Released: June 25, 2003
- Recorded: January–March 2003
- Studio: Noise Factory Studio, Milan
- Genre: Power metal
- Length: 52:08
- Label: Century Media
- Producer: Labyrinth

Labyrinth chronology
Sons of Thunder (2000)	Labyrinth (2003)	Freeman (2005)

Professional ratings
Review scores
Source	Rating
Rock Hard	8/10
Metal.de	8/10
Powermetal.de	
Vampster	¨

Labyrinth is the fourth self-titled studio album by the Italian power metal band Labyrinth, released June 25, 2003 on Century Media Records.

== Track listing ==
1. "The Prophet" - 4:46
2. "Livin' in a Maze" - 4:38
3. "This World" - 4:55
4. "Just Soldier (Stay Down)" - 5:27
5. "Neverending Rest" - 4:54
6. "Terzinato" - 5:50
7. "Slave to the Night" - 6:06
8. "Synthetic Paradise" - 5:48
9. "Hand in Hand" - 4:27
10. "When I Will Fly Far" - 5:17
11. "The Prophet" (Demo Version) - 5:04 (Japanese Bonus Track)
12. "Synthetic Paradise" (Demo Version) - 5:59 (Japanese Bonus Track)

== Personnel ==
=== Labyrinth ===
- Roberto Tiranti - Lyrics, Vocals
- Andrea Cantarelli - Guitars
- Cristiano Bertocchi - Bass
- Andrea De Paoli - Lyrics (Tracks 5 And 10), Keyboards, Programming
- Mattia Stancioiu - Drums
