= 667 (Pier Gonella album) =

Studio album by Pier Gonella
- Released: 24 April 2023
- Recorded: January 2022 – January 2023, at MusicArt Studios, Genoa, Italy
- Genre: hard rock, rock
- Length: 36:35
- Label: MusicArt / Diamonds Prod
- Producer: Pier Gonella

Pier Gonella chronology
Strategy (2020)	667 (2022)

Professional ratings
Review scores
Source	Rating
*MetalHammer	7.5/10 stars
*Metal Wave	7.2/10 stars
*Giornale Metal	8/10 stars

667 is the second album by Pier Gonella, released on April 24, 2023 by Diamonds Prod Records.

== Track listing ==
No.	Title	Writer(s)	Length
1.	"Margarita"	Gonella	3:17
2.	"667"	Gonella	4:39
3.	"Holy Water"	Gonella	5:31
4.	"Rock The Galaxy"	Gonella	4:09
5.	"Unforgettable"	Gonella	3:59
6.	"Make it Rock"	Gonella	3:26
7.	"Floor 666"	Gonella	4:00
8.	"Planet Stealers"	Gonella	3:46
9.	"Planet For Sale"	Gonella	3:59

== Personnel ==
- Pier Gonella – guitars
- Giulio Belzer – bass
- Marco 'Peso' Pesenti – drums
