= Dotma (band) =

Finnish gothic metal band

Dotma was a Finnish gothic metal band. They notably released one album on Scarlet Records, 2011's Sleep Paralyses.

Hailing from Hyvinkää, their self-released EP Dances with the Shadows from 2009 was met with criticism of being "the most blatant Nightwish clone I have ever heard"—at the same time as the gothic metal wave of the early 2000s had subsided. The production and performance were "flawless", though the EP lacked memorable hooks and choruses.

Dotma's debut album Sleep Paralyses received several mediocre reviews upon its 2011 release on Italian label Scarlet Records. Rock Hard only gave 4.5 points out of 10, and similarly, Metal.de bestowed 5 points out of 10. The reviewer found Dotma's music to "fall squarely into the cliché trap", as the band did not "dare to occasionallyveeture beyond the boundaries of the genre". Though Dotma played well, they were especially remeniscient of Leaves' Eyes or early Theatre of Tragedy. Norway's Scream Magazine likened Dotma to "Edenbridge raised to the third power", but only gave it 3 out of 6 points. The reviewer had "heard everything before", and claimed that Dotma would find its audience "among young girls with identity issues and mildly suicidal thoughts".

The album also got more positive reviews ranging from 7/10 to 8.5/10.
