= Lighthouse Pathetic =

Studio album by Mastercastle
- Released: 10 January 2022
- Recorded: January 2019 – August 2020, at MusicArt Studios, Genoa, Italy
- Genre: Neoclassical metal, hard rock, gothic metal
- Length: 55:05
- Label: Diamonds Prod
- Producer: Pier Gonella

Mastercastle chronology
Wine of Heaven (2017)	Lighthouse Pathetic (2022)

Professional ratings
Review scores
Source	Rating
metal-temple.com	9.2/10 stars
Metalitalia	7/10 stars
Loud and Proud	8.5/10 stars

Lighthouse Pathetic is the seventh album of the Italian heavy metal band Mastercastle, released on 10 January 2022 by the record label Diamonds Prod. There are also two instrumental tracks.

== History ==
The songs were composed between 2019 and 2020.

The instrumental track "Rosso Profondo" is a reworking of the song "Profondo Rosso" by the Italian progressive rock band Goblin. The track "Fantastic Planet", on the other hand, is a reworking of the soundtrack of the 1973 animated film Fantastic Planet (La Planète Sauvage).
The Digipack version of the album includes the bonus track "Princess," which is the 2008 demo version of the song "Princess of Love" from the first album. The album features numerous guests: Fabio Lione, Flegias, Andrea De Paoli, Mattia Stancioiu, Alessandro Bissa, and Francesco La Rosa.

All the lyrics are written by Giorgia Gueglio and consist of "a fascinating journey into our emotions, symbolized by the lighthouse that illuminates our path even when it seems dark and full of pitfalls". Pier Gonella summarizes, "musically, on the one hand, the album sees a return to our roots, with a more gritty and faster sound and a great deal of work on vocal melodies alternating with highly sought-after instrumental tracks".

The composition started in a very relaxed way about three years ago, maybe even a little earlier. For some time, I've been producing various types of musical bases and accompaniments that I then publish in digital format. In a series of Heavy Metal bases, I found two or three tracks that started everything. I thought that with Giorgia Gueglio's voice, these were "Mastercastle" songs. Two singles were released from the album: "Who Cares for the Moon", released on 28 June 2022, and the eponymous "Lighthouse Pathetic", released together with the rest of the album.

== Track listing ==
All lyrics by Giorgia Gueglio.
All music by Pier Gonella, except tracks 4-8-10

No.	Title	Writer(s)	Length
1.	"Who Cares for the Moon"	Mastercastle	4:18
2.	"The Lighthouse Pathetict"	Mastercastle	3:54
3.	"That's All"	Mastercastle	3:41
4.	"Rosso Profondo"	Goblin	3:41
5.	"Call Your Wings"	Mastercastle	4:55
6.	"Monster Whispers"	Mastercastle	5:33
7.	"Diamonds"	Mastercastle	3:51
8.	"Fantastic Planet"	Alain Goraguer	6:39
9.	"Space"	Mastercastle	4:03
10.	"Fast as a Shark"	Accept	3:38
11.	"Princess (Demo 2008)"	Mastercastle	4:19

== Line up ==
- Giorgia Gueglio – voice
- Pier Gonella – guitars
- Steve Vawamas – bass
- Francesco La Rosa – drums
