= In the Vanishing Echoes of Goodbye =

Studio album by Labyrinth
- Released: 24 January 2025
- Genres: Power metal; progressive metal
- Length: 57:41
- Label: Frontiers
- Producer: Simone Mularoni

Labyrinth chronology
Welcome to the Absurd Circus (2021)	In the Vanishing Echoes of Goodbye (2025)

Singles from In the Vanishing Echoes of Goodbye
- 1. "Welcome Twilight" Released: 5 November 2024; 2. "Out of Place" Released: 9 December 2024

Professional ratings
Review scores
Source	Rating
Chaoszine	4/5
Eternal Terror	4/6
Metal Hammer Italia	85/100
Metal Hammer Germany	4/7
Metal.de	8/10
Ramzine	4.5/5
Rock Hard	7/10

In the Vanishing Echoes of Goodbye is the tenth album by Italian power metal band Labyrinth, released on 24 January 2025 via Frontiers Records. The album's announcement came with the release of the single "Welcome Twilight". Vocalist Roberto Tiranti has stated about the positive feedback towards the album, "It seems that many people understood that we were and are totally free to write the music that we wanted to write, without any pressure, without any cliche. We just wanted to be ourselves and that’s the result."

== Track listing ==
In the Vanishing Echoes of Goodbye track listing
No.	Title	Length
1.	"Welcome Twilight"	5:40
2.	"Accept the Changes"	7:24
3.	"Out of Place"	5:02
4.	"At the Rainbow's End"	5:10
5.	"The Right Side of This World"	4:32
6.	"The Healing"	6:42
7.	"Heading for Nowhere"	4:48
8.	"Mass Distraction"	4:39
9.	"To the Son I Never Had"	6:02
10.	"Inhuman Race"	7:42
Total length:		57:41

== Personnel ==
Labyrinth

- Roberto Tiranti — lead vocals
- Andrea Cantarelli — guitars
- Olaf Thörsen — guitars
- Nik Mazzucconi — bass
- Oleg Smirnoff — keyboards
- Mattia Peruzzi — drums

Additional contributors

- Simone Mularoni — production, mastering, mixing
- Roberta Baciu — photography
