= Return to Heaven Denied =

Studio album by Labyrinth
- Released: June 24, 1998
- Genre: Power metal, symphonic metal
- Length: 57:49
- Label: Metal Blade
- Producer: Louis Stefanini, Pat Scalabrino and Labyrinth

Labyrinth chronology
No Limits (1996)	Return to Heaven Denied (1998)	Sons of Thunder (2001)

Professional ratings
Review scores
Source	Rating
Rock Hard	8.5/10
Metal.de	8/10
Powermetal.de	

Return to Heaven Denied is the second album by Italian power metal band, Labyrinth. It was the first album to feature Rob Tyrant on vocals. In 2010, the band released a follow-up to the album, titled Return to Heaven Denied Pt. II: "A Midnight Autumn's Dream" In 2021, it was elected by Metal Hammer as the 17th best symphonic metal album of all time.

== Music ==
Metal Hammer said the style "lean[ed] more towards power metal than full-on symphonic metal." The album incorporates classical guitars.

== Track listing ==
1. "Moonlight" - 5:43
2. "New Horizons" - 6:22
3. "The Night of Dreams" - 4:47
4. "Lady Lost in Time" - 5:32
5. "State of Grace" - 3:08
6. "Heaven Denied" - 4:57
7. "Thunder" - 4:21
8. "Feel" - 4:22
9. "Time After Time" - 5:07
10. "Falling Rain" - 6:26
11. "Die for Freedom" - 7:02

== Credits ==
- Rob Tyrant - vocals
- Olaf Thorsen - guitar
- Anders Rain - guitar
- Chris Breeze - bass
- Andrew Mc Pauls - keyboards
- Ken Taylor - keyboards
- Frank Andiver - drums (Studio)
- Mat Stancioiu - drums (Pictured with the band, but did not perform on the record)
