= Dangerous Diamonds =

Studio album by Mastercastle
- Released: 18 November 2011
- Recorded: July–September 2011, at "MusicArt" Studios, Genoa, Italy
- Genre: Neoclassical metal, hard rock
- Length: 54:05
- Label: Lion Music
- Producer: Pier Gonella

Mastercastle chronology
Last Desire (2010)	Dangerous Diamonds (2011)	On Fire (2013)

Dangerous Diamonds is the third album of the Italian heavy metal band Mastercastle, released by Lion Music on 18 November 2011.

== History ==
The album was recorded from July to September 2011 at MusicArt studios (Genova, Italy). (Genoa, Italy), but the composition began on February. Similar to their previous album Last Desire, the producer was Pier Gonella.

Professional ratings
Review scores
Source	Rating
*Dangerdog Music Reviews	4.5/5 stars
*Sea of tranquillity	4/5 stars

== Track listing ==
All lyrics were written by Giorgia Gueglio.

No.	Title	Writer(s)	Length
1.	"Another Flower"	Giorgia Gueglio, Pier Gonella	4:08
2.	"Alone"	Gueglio, Gonella	4:55
3.	"Time 4 Lovers"	Gueglio, Gonella	5:01
4.	"Icy Moon"	Gueglio, Gonella	3:59
5.	"Au Premier Coup"	Gueglio, Gonella	4:07
6.	"Dangerous Diamonds"	Gonella	4:53
7.	"Take-Off"	Gueglio, Gonella, Steve Vawamas	4:40
8.	"Blue Diamond"	Gueglio, Gonella	5:24
9.	"Lovin' Me"	Gueglio, Gonella	4:54
10.	"Sixth Sun"	Gueglio, Gonella	4:49
11.	"Bitter & Sweet"	Gueglio, Gonella	3:15

== Line up ==
- Giorgia Gueglio – voice
- Pier Gonella – guitars
- Steve Vawamas – bass
- Alessandro Bissa Bix – drums
