= Andrea De Paoli =

Italian professional footballer (born 1999)

Personal information
- Date of birth: 6 August 1999 (age 27)
- Place of birth: Genoa, Italy
- Height: 6 ft 1 in (1.85 m)
- Position: Forward

Team information
- Current team: AlbinoLeffe
- Number: 10

Youth career
- 2016–2017: Brescia
- 2017–2018: Genoa
- 2018: Ternana

Senior career*
Years	Team	Apps	(Gls)
2018–2019	Sambenedettese	4	(1)
2019–2020	Rieti	28	(4)
2020–2021	Cavese	12	(1)
2021–2022	Monopoli	15	(6)
2021–2022	→ Ascoli (loan)	15	(0)
2022–2023	Ascoli	0	(0)
2022–2023	→ Siena (loan)	12	(1)
2023–2024	Monopoli	19	(0)
2024–2025	Giugliano	21	(1)
2025	→ Catania (loan)	9	(1)
2025–	AlbinoLeffe	33	(8)
- * Club domestic league appearances and goals as of 30 April 2026

Andrea De Paoli (born 6 August 1999) is an Italian professional footballer who plays as a forward for Serie C Group A club AlbinoLeffe.

He can play as a central striker or as a winger.

== Early career ==
He was born in Genoa and was signed by Genoa in 2017. In the meantime he studied until he reached the diploma of the Linguistic Lyceum.

== Club career ==
After a short loan to Ternana, his first experience in professional football was in San Benedetto del Tronto (Serie C) in 2018 with the Sambenedettese team in which he scored a goal on his debut but a muscle injury made that year difficult.

In 2019 he played a starter with the Rieti team, playing all the games of the Championship until the stop required by the Covid pandemic (March 2020).

On 1 July 2020 he signed a 3-year contract with Cavese.

On 1 February 2021 he joined Monopoli on a 1.5-year contract.

On 24 August 2021, he moved to Serie B club Ascoli on loan with an obligation to buy.

On 29 July 2023, De Paoli returned to Monopoli on a two-year deal.
