= Mastercastle =

Italian heavy metal band

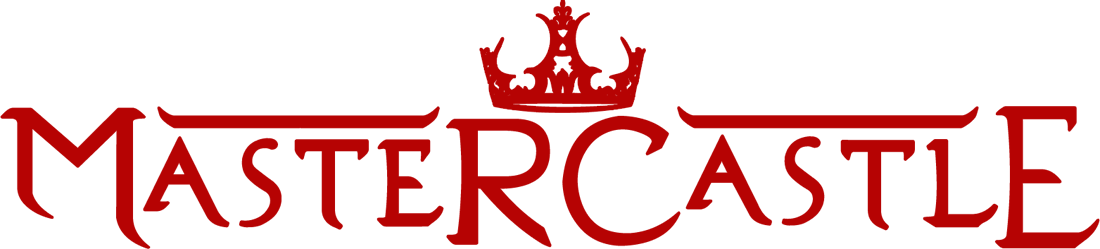

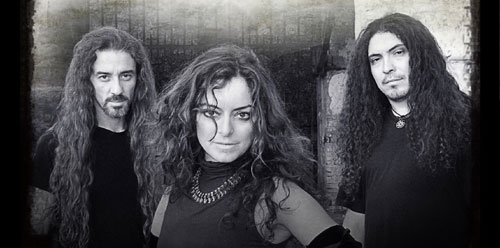

Background information
- Origin: Italy
- Genres: Power metal, heavy metal, neoclassical metal
- Years active: 2008–present
- Labels: Lion, Scarlet
- Members: Giorgia Gueglio; Pier Gonella; Steve Vawamas; Alessio Spallarossa

Mastercastle is an Italian heavy metal band formed in 2008 by guitarist Pier Gonella and singer Giorgia Gueglio.

== History ==
Mastercastle was founded in January 2008 by guitar player Pier Gonella and singer Giorgia Gueglio. The pair had several music projects in the past and wanted to try something different. No fixed genre was chosen with the emphasis being on producing music in a natural way.

The result was a natural mix of the virtuoso guitar style of Pier with the individual female voice of Giorgia Gueglio which worked well together. The pair wrote a great number of songs and recorded a four-song promo to gain label interest. In the meantime the lineup was completed by the drummer Alessandro Bissa aka Bix and the bassist Steve Vawamas; their joining changed the initial project into a real band and the name Mastercastle was settled on for the new real band.

In July 2008, they sent the demo to Lion Music who offered a deal which leads us up to the release of Mastercastle's debut album The Phoenix on 17 April 2009. The album met with widespread critical acclaim and the video for "Princess of Love" rapidly clocked up over 100,000 views on YouTube. The band had also a deal with the label Spiritual Beast for a Japanese release.

In the meantime, the band started immediately writing new stuff for a new album. Another four-song demo was sent to Lion Music and they get another deal. With the great experience of the previous album, the band worked better than before and produced 12 tracks (2 instrumental). The new album Last Desire was released by Lion Music on 18 June 2010, followed by the videoclip Last Desire.

In 2011, during the composition of new staff, the band was included in the project Embrace the Sun, a "benefic" cd produced by Lion Music and dedicated to the victims of the tsunami and earthquake that struck Japan in March 2011. The band donated the song Sakura (with the namesake videoclip) and the album was released in June 2011 including Jennifer Batten and many other musicians. Than the band finished the production of the new album that was released by Lion Music on 18 November 2011 with the title Dangerous Diamonds.

At the end of 2011, the band started working on the fourth album, at the beginning called Metals and the lineup was changed by the new drummer John Macaluso (Malmsteen, James LaBrie, 'Ark', 'Tnt'). The album was released on 19 April by Lion Music with the title On Fire.

In 2014, the band signed a deal with Scarlet Records for the releasing of the fifth album, titled Enfer (De La Bibliothèque Nationale). The album is described by the band as their heaviest effort to date, while still maintaining their trademark sound and with a special mention for the strongest production the band have ever benefited from.

On 3 October 2014, the band announced by many webzines and social networks the release of the videoclip "Enfer", and the date of release of the album Enfer (De La Bibliothèque Nationale) for 14 October.

On 28 June 2022, the band released the videoclip Who Cares for the Moon with Fabio Lione as special guest singer, and later the album Lighthouse Pathetic, preceded by the self-titled video, under the label "Diamonds Prod".

== Discography ==
=== Studio albums ===
- 2009: The Phoenix
- 2010: Last Desire
- 2011: Dangerous Diamonds
- 2013: On Fire
- 2014: Enfer (De La Bibliothèque Nationale)
- 2017: Wine of Heaven
- 2022: Lighthouse Pathetic

=== Collaborations ===
- 2011 – Embrace the Sun (guest on track 14: "Sakura")
