= Into the Macabre =

Studio album by Necrodeath
- Released: November 1987
- Recorded: 1987
- Studio: Obi-Wan Studio
- Genres: Black metal, thrash metal
- Length: 33:12
- Label: Scarlet Records

Necrodeath chronology
Into the Macabre (1987)	Fragments of Insanity (1989)

Professional ratings
Review scores
Source	Rating
Chronicles of Chaos	6/10 stars

Into the Macabre is the debut album of the Italian extreme metal band Necrodeath.

The album received a poor review, only 2 out of 10, from Metal.de. The reviewer claimed that the band sounded "exactly like" Venom and Sodom, and that the riffs were so unoriginal and "old that even a novice band has jammed at least half of them".

== Track listing ==
1. "...Agony / The Flag Of The Inverted Cross" - 3:36
2. "At The Mountains Of Madness" - 4:28
3. "Sauthenerom" - 4:07
4. "Mater Tenebrarum" - 4:32
5. "Necrosadist" - 3:47
6. "Internal Decay" - 4:23
7. "Graveyard Of The Innocents" - 3:35
8. "The Undead / Agony" (Reprise) - 4:43

== Credits ==
- Ingo: vocals
- Peso: drums
- Claudio: guitars
- Paolo: bass
