= Pier Gonella =

Italian guitarist

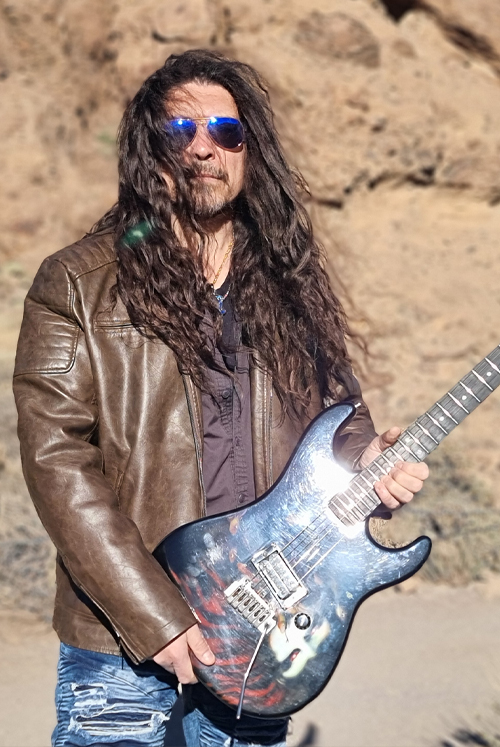
- Gonella in 2024

Background information
- Born: Pierangelo Gonella; Italy
- Genres: Heavy metal, neoclassical metal, hard rock, instrumental rock
- Occupations: Musician, songwriter, producer
- Instrument: Guitar
- Years active: 2001–present
- Website: piergonella.com

Pierangelo Gonella is an Italian guitarist, composer and producer, most known in the metal genre as founding member of the heavy metal bands Mastercastle, guitar player of the band Necrodeath, past member of the band Labyrinth, producer of many solo projects.

== Education and influences ==
Pier Gonella began playing guitar at the age of 15. During a 2012 interview he stated "I started to play listening to Pink Floyd, Scorpions and Deep Purple in particular. Then I fell in love of instrumental music of various artists like Satriani, Yngwie Malmsteen, Tony Macalpine, Vinnie Moore ecc.". From 1993 to 1997 Gonella studied guitar in many Italian schools. He could not find any rock guitar teachers, so he studied rock guitar by himself. He studied music theory and, in June 1998, received the diploma of "Teoria and Solfeggio" at the Conservatory of Music "Nicolo' Paganini" of Genoa. He also enrolled and studied four years of bassoon.

== Career ==
=== Labyrinth ===
From 2003 to 2008 he played with the power metal band Labyrinth in many Italian and European festivals (such as Gods of Metal, Metalway) and, in 2005, made a 6 "gig" tour in Japan, China and Taiwan. During the tour he recorded the DVD Live in Tokyo that was included at the album Freeman, released in 2006. In March 2007 he released the album "6 Days to Nowhere" with Labyrinth, and that same year, toured Japan again.

=== Necrodeath ===
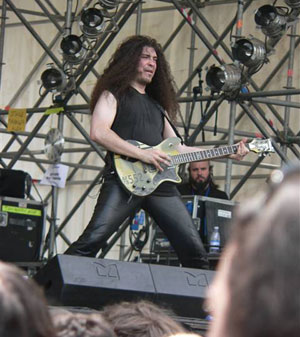
Pier Gonella playing live at the Italian Gods of Metal festival on 2006

He joined the band Necrodeath for the first time in 2006 as a guest guitarist. That year the band embarked on a 20-gig European tour supporting the band Marduk. In 2007, Pier recorded the guitars for the album Draculea. He left the band because he was busy with his other bands, but definitively re-joined Necrodeath in 2008. He recorded the albums Phylogenesis in 2009, Old Skull in 2010, The Age of Fear in 2011, Idiosyncrasy in 2012, The 7 Deadly Sins in 2014. All albums were followed by a European tour. He is still playing with this band.

=== Mastercastle ===
In 2008 Labyrinth decided to take a break. During that time Pier started a collaboration with the singer Giorgia Gueglio.

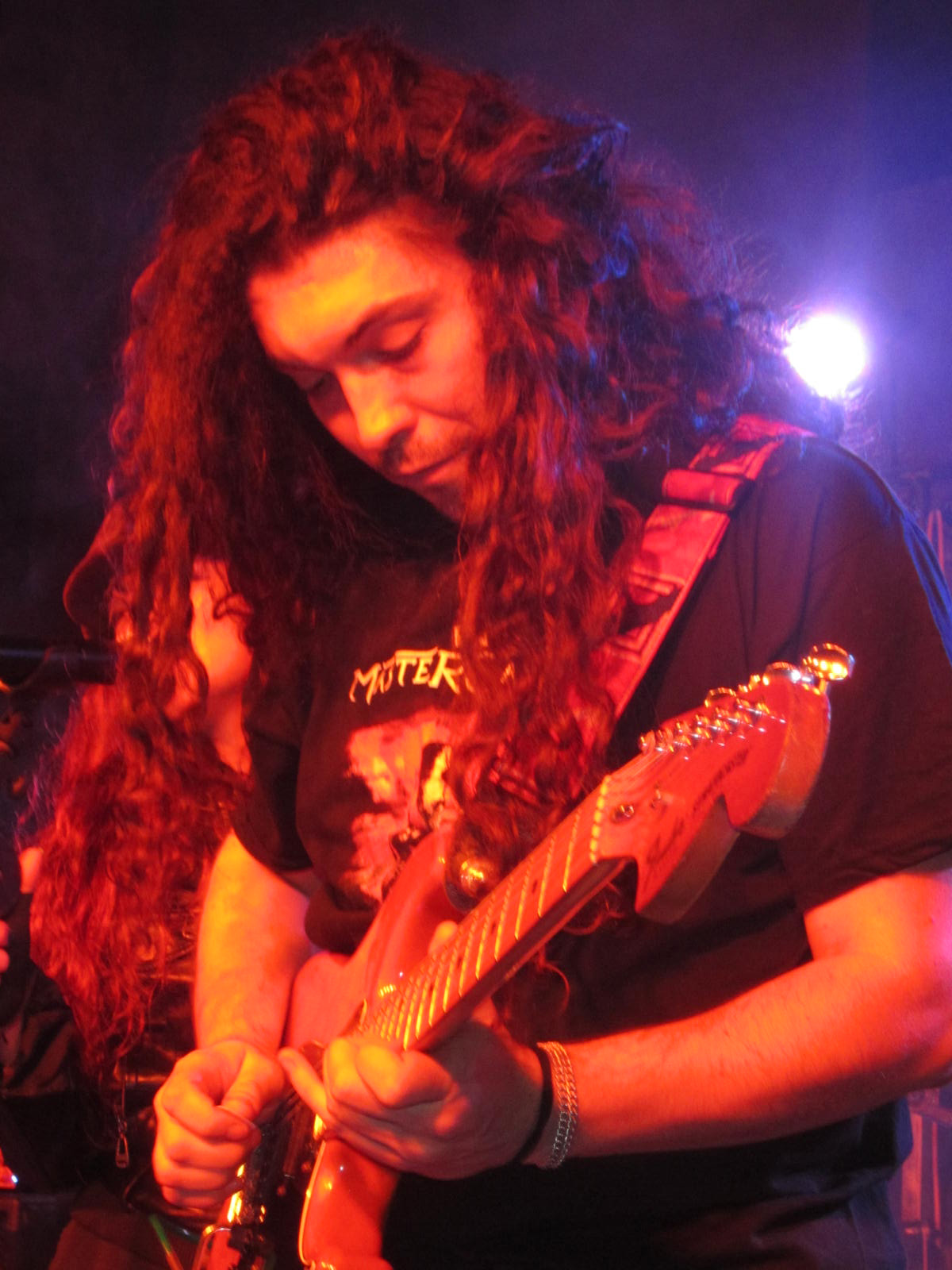
Pier Gonella in 2012

They wrote many songs and sent a demo to the label Lion Music which offered them a deal. In the meantime bass player Steve Vawamas and the drum player Alessandro Bissa joined the band. They chose the name Mastercastle and released the album The Phoenix in April 2009. The album was well reviewed especially in the USA. The music video "Princess of Love" reached over 150,000 views on YouTube very quickly, and the band continued composing music. In June 2010 they released the album Last Desire and, in 2011, the album Dangerous Diamonds. Many webzine's from all over the world gave Mastercastle and their albums very good reviews and Gonella also received really good reviews as a producer of the albums.
In 2012 the band had a split with the drummer "Bix". In 2013 Gonella announced the signing of a new drummer John Macaluso (Yngwie Malmsteen, James LaBrie, Ark, Tnt...). In the same year the band released the album On Fire which was produced and mixed by Gonella.
In 2014 the band signed a deal for Scarlet Records for the album Enfer that was released on 14 October 2014, and 'Wine of Heaven, that war released on 2017.
In June 2022 the band released the videoclip Who Cares for The Moon with Fabio Lione as special guest singer, and later the album Lighthouse Pathetic under the label "Diamonds Prod". Pier Gonella is still playing in this band.

=== Other projects ===
In 2001 Gonella recorded the guitars for the album Athlantis and in 2003 he recorded the guitar and bass part for the album Wild Steel. Both were published under the label Underground Symphony. In April 2005 during his militance in Labyrinth, he published the album Tears in Floods under the name Odyssea, released under the label Scarlet Records (Europe) and King Records (Japan).
In 2006 Gonella appears as guest in the project Rezophonic, recording guitars for one song.
In the summer of 2008 Gonella was chosen as second guitar player by Timo Tolkki (Stratovarius, Revolution Renaissance) for two Italian gigs.
In 1998 Gonella started teaching guitar lessons, working in many private schools and creating guitar clinics in the north of Italy. In 2007 he founded a recording studio for the production of his bands and for his guitar school. In 2011, it was officially opened to all with the name of MusicArt.
In 2011, together with the drummer Marco 'Peso' Pesenti of Necrodeath and Giorgia Gueglio and Steve Vawamas of Mastercastle, he start a new project, completely rearranging and recording the famous album The Dark Side of the Moon by Pink Floyd. The project is titled The Black side of the moon and was publicized for Black Tears label.
On 2002 Pier Gonella joined the historical Italian metal band Vanexa.
From August 2014 Gonella collaborates with the magazine Metal Hammer Italy, writing the article "Learn to play" where he teach techniques, licks, advice regarding electric guitar.
On 2014 Gonella started a new "soloist" project, with Dick Laurent (Cadaveria). Here Gonella plays live many Mastercastle songs in instrumental versions, classical arrangements (Johann Sebastian Bach, Wolfgang Amadeus Mozart and others) in rock style and other unreleased material.
On 2019 he started the instrumental band Pier Gonella with Marco 'Peso' Pesenti of Necrodeath on drums and Giulio Belzer on bass. The debut album Strategy was released in January 2020, with the two singles and videoclip "Strategy" and "Liberland".

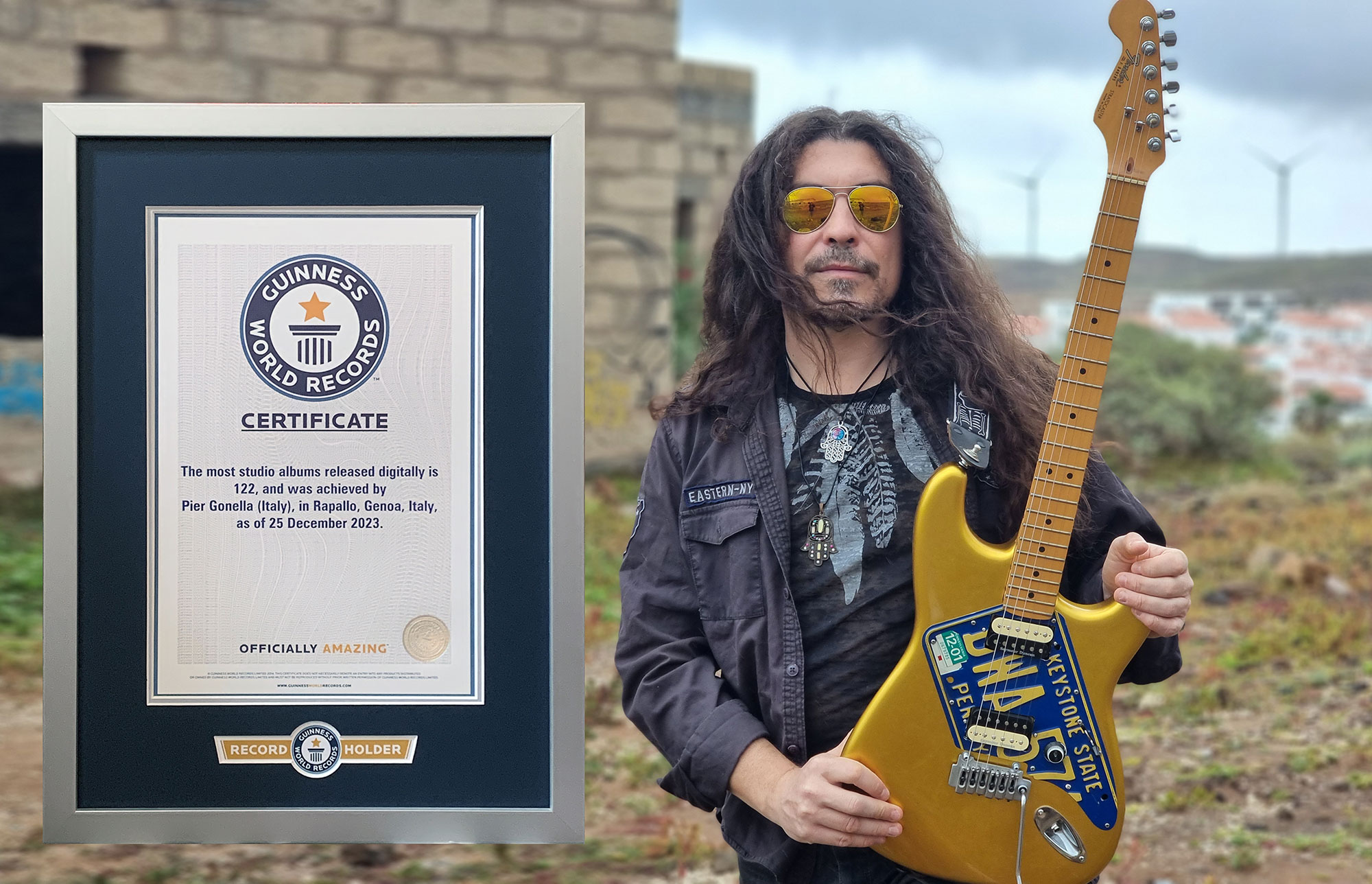
Pier Gonella in the Guinness World Records 2024

In April 2023 they released a new album titled 667, preceded by twi singles "Margarita". and “667”

Pier Gonella is also known for his YouTube channel Pier Gonella Jam, which features one of the largest and most popular collections of original "jam tracks" and backing tracks on the internet (more than 1700), and also his original music, videoclips, improvisations, tour vlogs and notable bands projects as Mastercastle, Necrodeath.
Thanks to the extensive production of songs and backing tracks, in December 2023 Pier Gonella entered the Guinness World Records for The Most Studio Album Digitally Released. He released 122 album with artist name "Pier Gonella Jam" and he stated that he has recorded over 300 including all his bands and projects.

== Discography ==
- 2001: Athlantis (with the band Athlantis)
- 2003: Wild Steel (with the band Wild Steel)
- 2004: Tears in floods (with the band Odyssea)
- 2005: Freeman (with the band Labyrinth)
- 2007: Draculea (with the band Necrodeath)
- 2007: 6 days to nowhere (with the band Labyrinth)
- 2008: Amazing Maze (with the band Amazing Maze)
- 2009: Phylogenesis (with the band Necrodeath)
- 2009: The Phoenix (with the band Mastercastle)
- 2010: Old Skul (with the band Necrodeath)
- 2010: Last Desire (with the band Mastercastle)
- 2011: As Time Goes By... (with the band Labyrinth)
- 2011: The Age of Fear (with the band Necrodeath)
- 2011: Idiosyncrasy (with the band Necrodeath)
- 2011: Dangerous Diamonds (with the band Mastercastle)
- 2012: Athlantis – M.W.N.D. (with the band Athlantis)
- 2012: The Black Side of the Moon (with the band MusicArt Project)
- 2013: Hellive (with the band Necrodeath)
- 2013: On Fire (with the band Mastercastle)
- 2014: The 7 deadly sins (with the band Necrodeath)
- 2014: Enfer (with the band Mastercastle)
- 2011: Headhunting (with the band Necrodeath)
- 2015: Sono animali al mondo (with the band Verde Lauro)
- 2015: Storm (with the band Odyssea)
- 2016: Colors & Dreams (with the band MusicArt Project)
- 2016: Mondoscuro (with the band Cadaveria Necrodeath)
- 2016: Too Heavy To Fly (with the band Vanexa)
- 2017: Chapter 4 (with the band Athlantis)
- 2017: 6 aprile (with the band Verde Lauro)
- 2017: Wine of Heaven (with the band Mastercastle)
- 2018: The age of Dead christ (with the band Necrodeath)
- 2019: The Way of Rock 'n Roll (with the band Athlantis)
- 2019: Defragments of Insanity (with the band Necrodeath)
- 2019: Still in the Flesh (with the band Mastercastle)
- 2020: 02022020 (with the band Athlantis)
- 2020: Neraka (with the band Necrodeath)
- 2020: Strategy (with the band "Pier Gonella")
- 2021: The Last in Black (with the band "Vanexa")
- 2022: Lighthouse Pathetic (with the band Mastercastle)
- 2023: Singin' in the Pain (with the band Necrodeath)
- 2023: 667 (with the band "Pier Gonella")

== Videogames soundtracks ==
Since 2008 Gonella collaborates with the Italian videogames factory called Xplored. To date Gonella has made soundtracks and sample effects for over 150 flash games.
Some examples:

- Zombie in the Shadow
- Zombies in the Shadow-The savuoir
- Toxie Radd
- Toxie Radd2
- Toxie Radd 3d
- Dark Base2-THE HIVE
- Dark Base3-Phoenix Team
- Toys Vs Nightmares
- X-Team
- Dark Base-alien Rts
- Apokalyx
- Duo Blaster
- EcoBears
- Red Jet Rabbit
- Zits-20 to die
- Chili'Em All
- Drow's Fury
- X-cream
- Dark Base Defence
- Suprb
- Motel Connection
- Troll revenge
- Season of War
- Methus'Tower Defence
- Secure Mc
- TacticalForce1
- KinderBuenoMegaRace
- Area52
- Zombiestalker
- Future Buggy
