= Giorgia Gueglio =

Italian singer

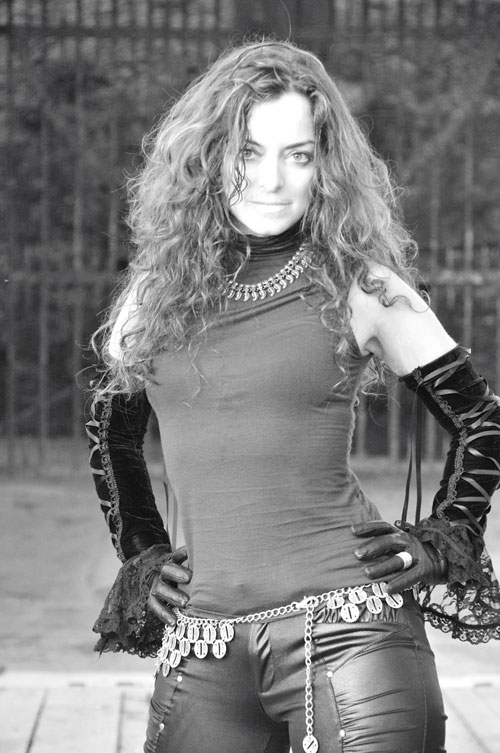

Background information
- Born: 1973 (age 51–52)
- Origin: Genoa, Italy
- Genres: Heavy metal
- Occupation: Singer
- Years active: 1998–present
- Labels: Lion Music
- Member of: Mastercastle

Giorgia Gueglio (born 1973) is an Italian singer and founding member of the heavy metal band Mastercastle.

== Biography ==
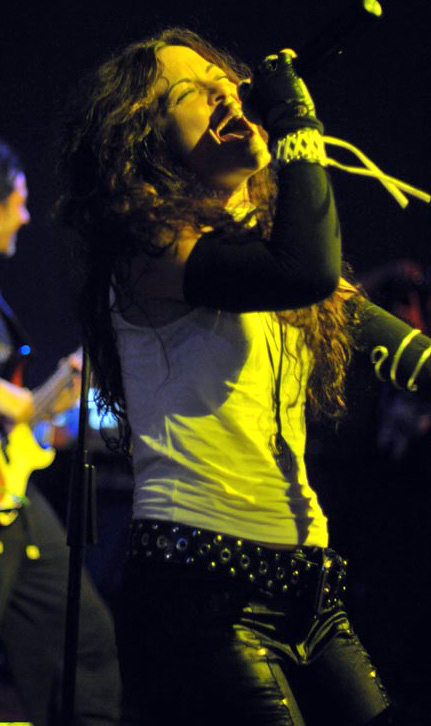
Gueglio performing in 2009

She started singing in 1990, following her passion for singers like David Coverdale, Robert Plant and Ian Gillan.

From 1994 she entered many hard rock and heavy metal bands. In 2004, she became a member of the gothic metal project Artisluna, featuring the first Labyrinth drummer Mattia Stancioiu, who was also the producer. Another musician involved in the project was guitar player Pier Gonella, member of Labyrinth and Necrodeath.

In 2008, she founded the band Mastercastle together with Pier Gonella. With this band she published the album The Phoenix in 2009 and the album Last Desire in 2010, both under the label Lion Music.

In 2001 she was contacted for a collaboration by the extreme metal band Necrodeath. She recorded the voice of the song "Queen of Desire (onyric version)", included on their album The Age of Fear, released on 26 May 2011 by Scarlet Records.

== Discography ==
=== Albums ===
- 2009 – Mastercastle – The Phoenix
- 2010 – Mastercastle – Last Desire
- 2011 – Mastercastle – Dangerous Diamonds

=== Collaborations ===
- 2011 – Necrodeath – The Age of Fear (voice on track 14)
- 2011 – Embrace the Sun (guest in the track 14: Sakura)
- 2012 – Athlantis – M.W.N.D. (voice on track 9)

== External links and references ==
- Giorgia Gueglio's official myspace site
- A recent Gueglio's interviews
