= Necrodeath =

Italian extreme metal band

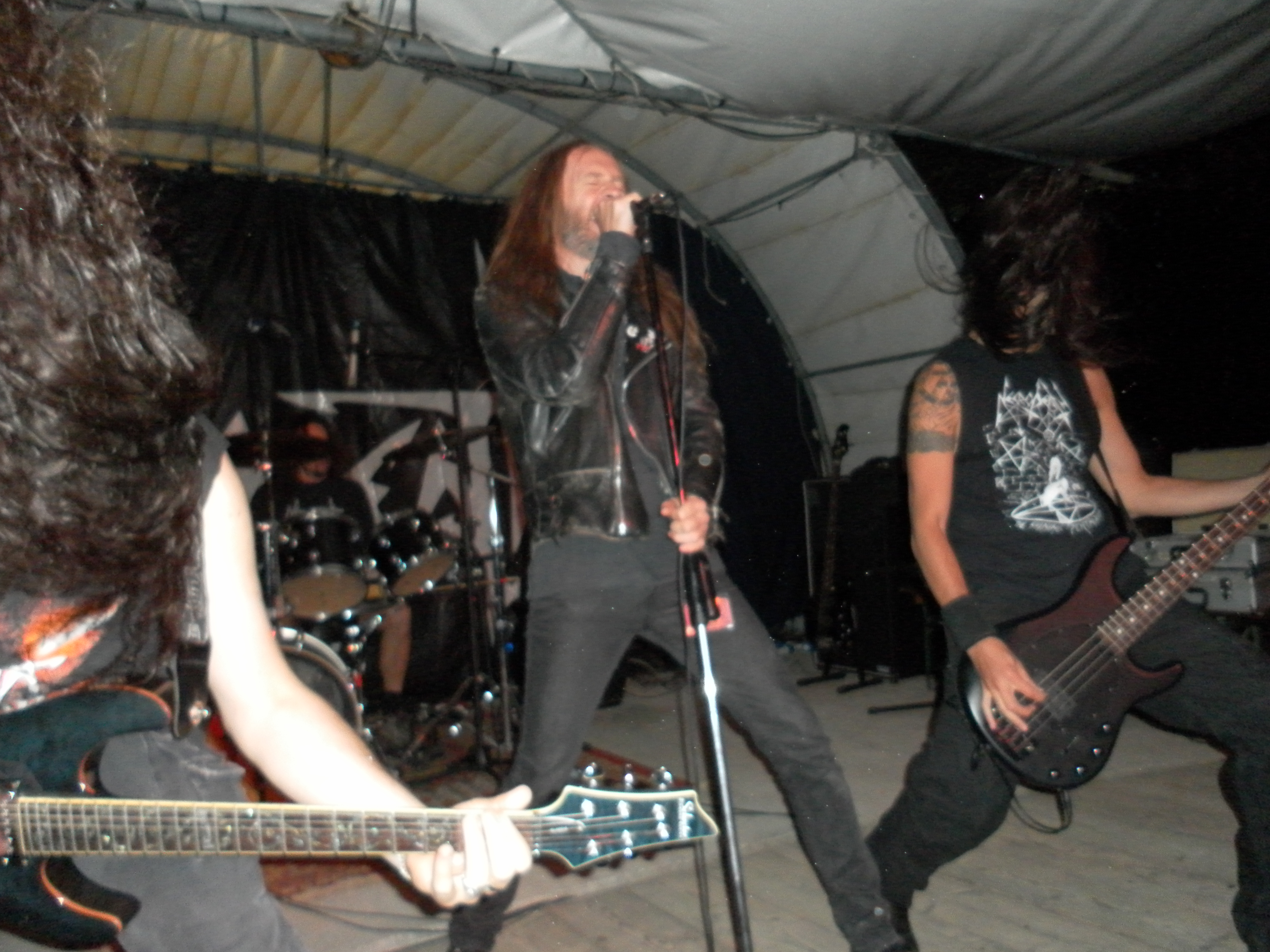
- Necrodeath live at Genoa (2010)

Background information
- Also known as: Ghostrider (1984–1986)
- Origin: Genoa, Italy
- Genres: Black metal; thrash metal
- Years active: 1984–1989; 1998–2025
- Label: Scarlet Records
- Website: necrodeath.net

Necrodeath was an Italian extreme metal band from Liguria. It is one of the first Italian extreme metal bands. They are inspired by Slayer, Dark Angel, Possessed, Venom, Kreator, Celtic Frost, Bathory and Sodom. AllMusic stated that their sound was "rooted in blackened death metal and thrash." The band is know for their live performances and their "wall of sound".

== History ==
After watching Venom live, Claudio (guitars) and Peso (drums) formed the band in 1984 as Ghostrider. Along with Ingo (vocals) and Paolo (bass), they released the Slayer, Kreator and Bathory-influenced, 4-track demo The Shining Pentagram, which gained them a following in the underground metal scene.

Metal press and fanzines praised their first two albums, Into the Macabre (1988) and Fragments of Insanity (1989). The band disbanded after the second album.

Claudio and Peso reformed the band in 1998. Singer Flegias replaced Ingo. John became the new bass player. They have released eleven more albums, described as "challenging, eclectic heavy metal".

Necrodeath released Draculea on October 22, 2007. The album is based on Vlad Tepes.

In 2008, Pier Gonella joined on guitar as an official member after touring with the band for two years. He recorded the albums Draculea, Phylogenesis, Old Skull and Idiosyncrasy at his MusicArt studios.

On August 19, 2024, Necrodeath disbanded for the second time, after a new album and farewell tour in 2025. Their final album, Arimortis, was released on January 17, 2025.

== Members ==
=== Final lineup ===
- Peso – drums (1985–1990, 1998–2025)
- Flegias – vocals (1998–2025)
- Pier Gonella – guitars (2007–2025)
- GL – bass (2008–2025)

=== Former members ===
- Claudio – guitars (1985–1990, 1998–2003)
- Ingo – guitars, vocals (1985–1998)
- Paolo – bass (1985–1998)
- Andy – guitars (2003–2006)
- John – bass (1998–2008)
- Maxx – guitars (2007–2009)

== Discography ==
=== Studio albums ===
- Into the Macabre (1987)
- Fragments of Insanity (1989)
- Mater of All Evil (1999)
- Black as Pitch (2001)
- Ton(e)s of Hate (2003)
- 100% Hell (2006)
- Draculea (2007)
- Phylogenesis (2009)
- Idiosyncrasy (2011)
- The 7 Deadly Sins (2014)
- The Age of Dead Christ (2018)
- Defragments of Insanity (2019; re-recorded version of Fragments of Insanity)
- Singin' in the Pain (2022)
- Arimortis (2025)

=== Compilation albums ===
- 20 Years of Noise 1985–2005 (2005)
- Old Skull (2010)
- The Age of Fear (2011)

=== EPs ===
- Headhunting (2015)
- Neraka (2019)
- Transformer Treatment (2022)

=== Demos ===
- Rehearsal '84 (1984, as Ghostrider)
- The Exorcist (1984, as Ghostrider)
- Mayhemic Destruction (1985, as Ghostrider)
- The Shining Pentagram (1986)

=== Side-project ===
- Mondocane: Project One (with Schizo) (1990)

=== Video ===
- From Hate To Scorn Home Video (2001)
- Hellive (2013)
