= Scarlet Records =

Italian independent record label

- Parent company: BL Music
- Founded: 1998
- Founder: Filippo Bersani
- Status: Active
- Genre: Power metal Melodic Death metal Heavy metal Death metal
- Country of origin: Italy
- Location: Milan
- Official website: www.scarletrecords.it

Scarlet Records is an Italian independent record label based in Milan. It is most notable for featuring two side projects from Soilwork front-man Björn "Speed" Strid, as well as bands like Agent Steel, Royal Hunt, Skyclad, Eldritch, Hatesphere, Labyrinth, Dark Moor, DGM and more. Founded in 1998, Scarlet Records has released more than 400 albums. In 2011 Scarlet Records entered a distribution deal with Entertainment One Distribution for the North American distribution of its new releases and extensive physical and digital catalog. In 2021 become a limited company.

== Current artists ==
- Aeon Gods
- Apostolica
- Atlas Pain
- Band of Spice
- Be the Wolf
- Cainites
- Cellador
- Cryonic Temple
- Darktribe
- Degrees of Truth
- Deathless Legacy
- Dragonknight
- Eagleheart
- Eldritch
- Elettra Storm
- Excalion
- Faithsedge
- Fellowship
- Furor Gallico
- Game Over
- Hatesphere
- Horned Almighty
- Kayser
- Lahmia
- Light & Shade
- My Regime
- National Suicide
- Necrodeath
- Nocturna
- Noveria
- Reasons Behind
- Sadist
- Sinheresy
- Skeletoon
- Stormlord
- Theatres des Vampires
- Trick or Treat
- Ulvedharr
- Vandor
- Verikalpa
- Vexillum
- Vision Divine
- Volturian
- Whyzdom

== Former bands ==
- Aborym
- Agent Steel
- Arachnes
- Arthemis
- Barcode
- Blinded Colony
- Bloodshot
- Bokor
- Brick
- Bulldozer
- Cadaveria
- Dark Moor
- DGM
- Disarmonia Mundi
- Dotma
- Dragonhammer
- Empyrios
- Extrema
- Frozen Crown
- Holy Knights
- Infinita Symphonia
- Invocator
- Kaledon
- Kingcrow
- Labyrinth
- Malfeitor
- Manticora
- Mastercastle
- Metatrone
- Michele Luppi
- Node
- Odd Dimension
- Operatika
- Sawthis
- Scamp
- Odyssea
- Requiem
- Revolution Renaissance
- Royal Hunt
- Schizo
- Shaman
- Secret Sphere
- Scar of the Sun
- Skylark
- Skyclad
- Slowmotion Apocalypse
- Solar Fragment
- SmaXone
- Spice & The RJ Band
- Subzero
- Temperance
- Tigertailz
- Timo Tolkki
- Tears of Magdalena
- Terror 2000
- Thy Majestie
- Tyrant Eyes
- Wuthering Heights

== See also ==
- List of record labels
