= Universe (disambiguation) =

The universe is all of time and space and their contents.

Universe may also refer to:

== Science and technology ==
=== Mathematics ===
- Universe (mathematics), a class large enough to contain all sets one may wish to use
  - Universal set, a mathematical set which contains all objects, including itself

=== Computing ===
- Universe (Unix), variant of the working environment in some operating systems
- UniVerse, a MultiValue database platform
- Electric Image Animation System or Universe, 3D computer graphics package

== Arts, media and entertainment ==
=== Publications ===
- Universe (anthology series), science fiction anthologies edited by Terry Carr
- Universe: The Definitive Visual Guide, 2005 nonfiction book by nine British authors
- The Universe (Catholic newspaper), British Roman Catholic newspaper
- The Universe (student newspaper), publication at Brigham Young University
- "Universe", 1941 novella by Robert A. Heinlein later published as the first half of Orphans of the Sky
- Wszechświat or Universe, Polish popular-science journal

=== Film and television ===
- Universe (1960 film), black-and-white animated documentary short
- Universe (1976 film), documentary short
- Universe, 1980–1982 television newsmagazine hosted by Walter Cronkite
- The Universe (TV series), 2007–2015 documentary TV series
- Stargate Universe, science fiction TV series
- Stephen Hawking's Universe, 1997 documentary
- Steven Universe, a Cartoon Network Series
- Universe, 2021 documentary TV series by Brian Cox
- Our Universe (American TV series), a Netflix series

=== Music ===
- Ibanez Universe, guitar by the Ibanez company
- Universe Symphony (Ives), unfinished classical work
- [UNVRS], a nightclub on the Spanish island of Ibiza, pronounced "universe"

==== Albums ====
- Universe (Dead Brain Cells album)
- Universe (Hampton Hawes album), 1972
- Universe (Koda Kumi album), 2010
- Universe (Kyoko Fukada album), 2001
- Universe (Modern Talking album), 2003
- Universe (Mohombi album), 2014
- Universe (Planet X album), 2000
- Universe (Exo EP), 2017
- Universe (Sarah Slean EP), 1998
- Universe (Truckfighters album), 2014
- Universe (NCT album), 2021
- Universes (album), a 2008 album by Birds of Tokyo

==== Songs ====
- "Universe" (Exo song), 2017
- "Universe", a song by Loona from 12:00
- "Universe" (Savage Garden song), 1997
- "Universe" (ShuuKaRen song), 2016
- "Universe" (Slade song), 1991
- "Universe", a song by Alien Ant Farm from Anthology
- "Universe", a song by Jay Sean from Neon
- "Universe", a song by Mohombi from his album Universe
- "Universe", a song by Scars on Broadway from Scars on Broadway
- "The Universe!", a song by Do Make Say Think from the album You, You're a History in Rust
- "III. Universe" and/or "V. Universe", songs by the Microphones from Mount Eerie
- "Universe (Let's Play Ball)", a song by NCT-U from their album Universe, 2021
- "The Universe", a song by Gregory Alan Isakov from The Weatherman, 2013
- "The Universe", a song by Róisín Murphy from upcoming album Hit Parade, 2023

=== Games ===
- Universe (1983 video game), science fiction video game by Omnitrend Software
- Universe (1994 video game), adventure game by Core Design
- Universe (role-playing game), science fiction tabletop role-playing game
- Universe, a pentomino board made by Parker Brothers

=== Other arts and entertainment ===
- Universe (artpiece), everything included as a found artwork by French fluxus artist Ben Vautier
- Universes (theatre ensemble), a New York City based hip hop poetic theatre ensemble
- The World (Tarot card), a Tarot card also referred to as "The Universe"
- Universe (Danish amusement park), a science and amusement park in Denmark
- Marusankakushikaku, an artwork with the English name "The Universe"

== Sport ==
- Frankfurt Universe, an American football team from Frankfurt, Germany
- Universe (video game player) (Saahil Arora, born 1989), American professional Dota 2 player

== Other uses ==
- B Universe, an Indonesian media company, owner of Investor Daily
- Hyundai Universe, a bus produced by Hyundai Motor Company
- Universe, an international Masonic Lodge of the Grand Orient of Poland
- Universe (economics), a population to be studied or measured
- Universe (yacht), a 2018 Dutch superyacht
- Miss Universe, an annual international beauty pageant competition

== See also ==
- "My Universe", a song by Coldplay from the 2021 album Music of the Spheres
- Captain Universe, a fictional superhero appearing in Marvel Comics
- Fictional universe, a self-consistent setting for several stories
- Observable universe, a region of space surrounding Earth
- Universe of discourse, the relevant set for a purpose
- Everything (disambiguation)
- Megaverse (disambiguation)
- Metaverse (disambiguation)
- Multiverse (disambiguation)
- Omniverse (disambiguation)
- Our Universe (disambiguation)
- Parallel universe (disambiguation)
- Univers, a font
- Universal (disambiguation)
- University, an educational and research institution
- Universum (disambiguation)
- Universo (disambiguation)
- Univrs, an album by Alva Noto
- Youniverse (disambiguation)
