= Alternate reality =

Alternate reality (or Alternative reality, UK English) often refers to parallel universes in fiction, a self-contained separate world, universe or reality coexisting with the real world, which is used as a recurring plot point or setting used in fantasy and science fiction.

Alternate reality may also refer to:

== Science ==
- The many-worlds interpretation of quantum mechanics, which implies the existence of parallel universes
- Multiverse, a group of multiple universes

== Arts and media ==
- Alternate history, a genre of fiction consisting of stories that are set in worlds in which historical events unfold differently from the real world
- Alternate universe (fan fiction), fiction by fan authors that deliberately alters facts of the canonical universe they are writing about

=== Literature ===
- Alternate Realities (Cherryh), a 2000 anthology of science fiction by C. J. Cherryh

=== Games and video games ===
- Alternate Reality (series), a role-playing video game series started in 1985 with two of several intended games released
- Alternate reality game, a type of cross-media game
- Virtual reality, simulated reality

== Other uses ==
- A euphemism for "psychedelic experience"

== See also ==
- Metaverse, a collective virtual shared space
- Parallel universe (disambiguation)
- Separate reality (disambiguation)
- Megaverse (disambiguation)
- Multiverse (disambiguation)
- Omniverse (disambiguation)
- AR (disambiguation)
- Augmented reality
- Alternate facts
