= Parallelity =

Parallelity or Parallelities may refer to:

- Parallelity of the pole faces of an electromagnet in Shim (magnetism)
- Parallelities, novel by Alan Dean Foster

== See also ==
- Parallel (disambiguation), parallelity is the condition of being parallel
- Parallelism (disambiguation)
- Parallel universe (disambiguation)
