= Praise My Day =

Studio album by Perseo Miranda
- Released: December 15, 2009
- Genre: Progressive metal; heavy metal
- Label: Erga Edizioni

Perseo Miranda chronology
| Parallel Dimensions (2008) | Praise My Day (2009) | A Silence That Screams (2010) |

Praise My Day is Perseo Miranda's sixth album, released December 15, 2009 on Erga Edizioni. The album was recorded at Music Art Studios (Italy) in September and October 2009.

== Track listing ==
1. Praise My Day part 1
2. Praise My Day part 2
3. In This World part I part 1
4. In This World part II – (strumentale)
5. Class of Words
6. Shock Arms
7. Praise My Day part 3
8. Praise My Day part 4
9. Load
