= AR =

AR, Ar, or A&R may refer to:

== Arts, entertainment, and media ==
=== Music ===
- Artists and repertoire
- AR (EP), the debut EP by Addison Rae

=== Periodicals ===
- Absolute Return + Alpha, a hedge fund publication
- The Adelaide Review, an Australian arts magazine
- American Renaissance (magazine), a white nationalist magazine and website
- Architectural Review, a British architectural journal
- Armeerundschau, a magazine of the East German army

=== Other media ===
- Ar, city on the fictional planet Gor
- A.r. group, an avant-garde art group

== Business ==
- Accounts receivable, abbreviated as AR or A/R
- Acoustic Research, an American audio electronics manufacturer
- Aerojet Rocketdyne, an American aerospace and defense manufacturer
- Aerolíneas Argentinas (IATA airline code AR)
- AtkinsRéalis, Canadian engineering company
- Some Alfa Romeo car models, e.g. AR51
- Toyota AR engine

== Language ==
- Ar, the Latin letter R when spelled out
- Ar (cuneiform), a cuneiform combined sign
- Arabic, by ISO 639-1 language code

== Science and technology ==
=== Computing ===
- Accelerated Reader, educational reading assessment software
- Adaptive routing, in networking
- Adobe Aero, an Adobe software
- ar (Unix), a Unix archive format and handling tool
- Augmented reality, a type of 3D human-computer interaction similar to virtual reality

=== Biology and medicine ===
- Androgen receptor, a nuclear hormone receptor
- Antimicrobial resistance to drugs
- Aortic regurgitation, a heart valve disease
- Autosomal recessive inheritance

=== Mathematics ===
- ar-, a prefix of inverse hyperbolic functions
- Autoregressive model, concerning random processes in statistics

=== Physics, chemistry and engineering ===
- Aqua regia, a chemical mixture
- Archimedes number in fluid dynamics
- Argon (Ar), a chemical element
- Aryl group, in organic chemistry
- Aspect ratio (aeronautics), of a wing
- Relative atomic mass (A_{r}), the ratio of the average mass of atoms of an element
- Anti-reflective coating

== Military and weapons ==
- A US Navy hull classification symbol: Repair ship (AR)
- Armalite Rifle
  - AR-15–style rifle, rifles based on ArmaLite's AR-15
- Army Reserve (Ireland), the land component of the Irish Reserve Defence Forces (RDF)

== Places ==
- Ar (city), in ancient Moab
- Appenzell Ausserrhoden, Switzerland
- Province of Arezzo, Italy, vehicle registration code
- Argentina (ISO 3166-1 alpha-2 country code)
  - .ar, the country code Top Level Domain for Argentina
- Arkansas, United States
- Armstrong–Ringsted Community School District, Iowa, United States
- Arunachal Pradesh, a state of India

== Politics and ethics ==
- Affirmative Repositioning, a political movement in Namibia
- Animal rights, a philosophy
- Animal rights movement, a social movement advocating for other animals
- Antipodean Resistance, an Australian neo-Nazi group

== Other uses ==
- Alternate reality (disambiguation), includes various concepts
- 🜇 or AR, a numismatic abbreviation for "silver"
- Argent, the heraldic tincture of silver
- Assistant referee (association football)
- Auto rickshaw, a motorized three-wheeled vehicle common in South Asia
- Avis de réception, postal advice or acknowledgement of receipt

== See also ==
- ARTV (disambiguation)
