= Cosmos =

Universe as a complex and orderly system or entity

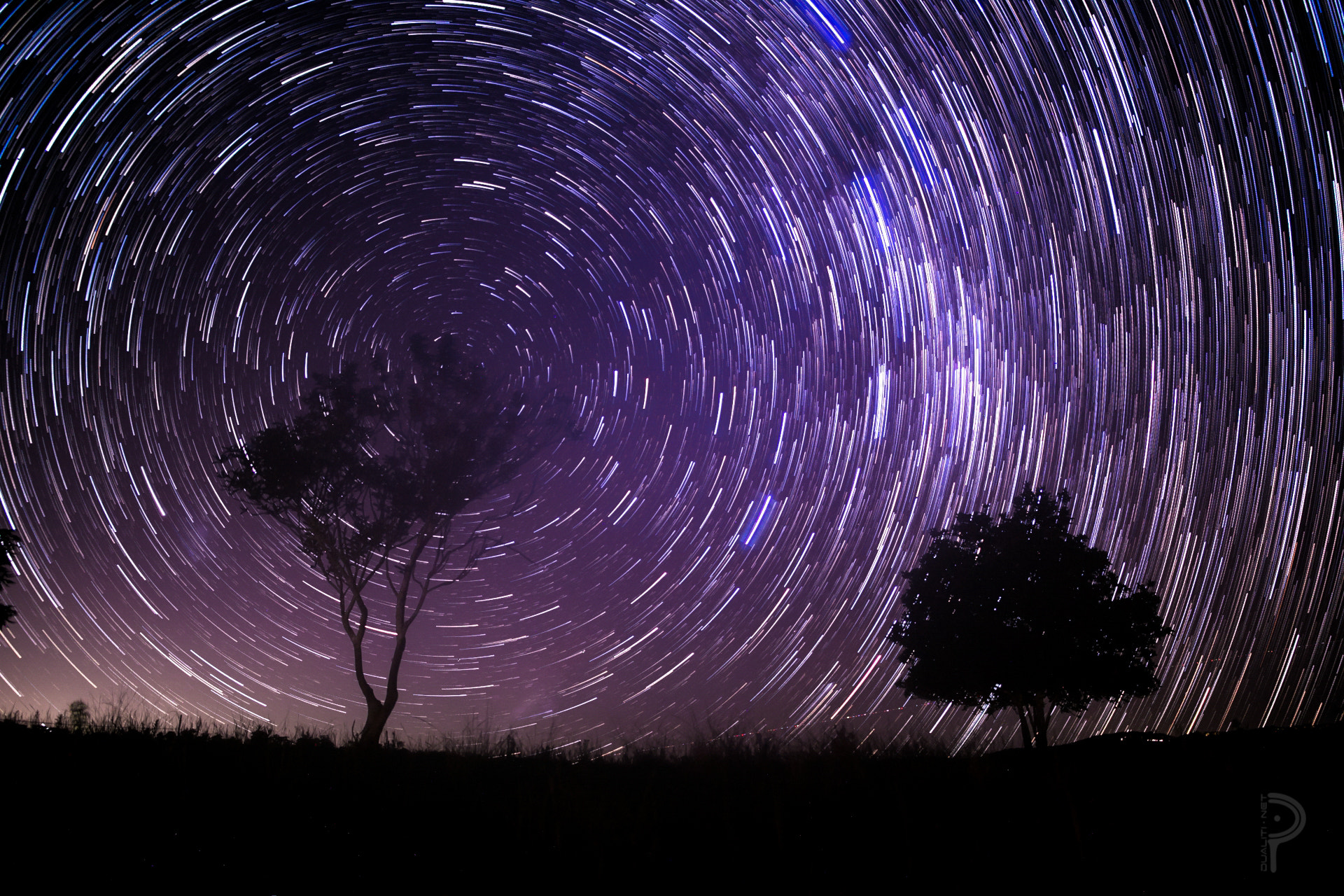
Stars rotating in the night sky

The cosmos (/ˈkɒzmɒs/, US also /-moʊs, -məs/; Ancient Greek: κόσμος, romanized: kósmos) is an alternative name for the universe or its nature or order. Usage of the word cosmos implies viewing the universe as a complex and orderly system or entity.

The cosmos is studied in cosmology – a broad discipline covering scientific, religious or philosophical aspects of the cosmos and its nature. Religious and philosophical approaches may include the cosmos among spiritual entities or other matters deemed to exist outside the physical universe.

== Etymology ==
The verb κοσμεῖν kosmeîn meant generally 'to dispose, prepare', but especially 'to order and arrange' (troops for battle), 'to set (an army) in array'; also 'to establish' (a government or regime), 'to adorn, dress' (especially of women). Thus kósmos meant 'ornaments, decoration' (compare kosmokómes 'dressing the hair' and the English word cosmetic). The philosopher Pythagoras used the term kósmos for the order of the universe. Anaxagoras further introduced the concept of a Cosmic Mind (nous) ordering all things.

== History ==
=== Ancient Greek religion ===
The 1870 book Dictionary of Greek and Roman Biography and Mythology noted

Thales dogma that water is the origin of things, that is, that it is that out of which every thing arises, and into which every thing resolves itself, Thales may have followed Orphic cosmogonies, while, unlike them, he sought to establish the truth of the assertion. Hence, Aristotle, immediately after he has called him the originator of philosophy brings forward the reasons which Thales was believed to have adduced in confirmation of that assertion; for that no written development of it, or indeed any book by Thales, was extant, is proved by the expressions which Aristotle uses when he brings forward the doctrines and proofs of the Milesian. (p. 1016)

Plato, describes the idea of the good, the cosmic mind or the Godhead, sometimes teleologically, as the ultimate purpose of all conditioned existence; sometimes cosmologically, as the ultimate operative cause; and has begun to develop the cosmological, as also the physico-theological proof for the being of God; but has referred both back to the idea of the Good, as the necessary presupposition to all other ideas, and the cognition of them. (p. 402)

The book The Works of Aristotle (1908, p. 80 Fragments) mentioned

Aristotle says the poet Orpheus never existed; the Pythagoreans ascribe this Orphic poem to a certain Cercon (see Cercops).

Bertrand Russell (1947) noted

The Orphics were an ascetic sect; wine, to them, was only a symbol, as, later, in the Christian sacrament. The intoxication that they sought was that of "enthusiasm," of union with the god. They believed themselves, in this way, to acquire mystic knowledge not obtainable by ordinary means. This mystical element entered into Greek philosophy with Pythagoras, who was a reformer of Orphism as Orpheus was a reformer of the religion of Dionysus. From Pythagoras Orphic elements entered into the philosophy of Plato, and from Plato into most later philosophy that was in any degree religious.

=== Anaximander ===
Anaximander was a pre-Socratic Greek philosopher who is widely referred to as the "father of astronomy" and even as the "father of cosmology" as a result of his works to explain the origin and makeup of the physical universe. He is regarded as the most important of the Ionian philosophers, and was a pupil of Thales. Traditionally, details of his life and opinions are perpetuated not only by Aristotle and Theophrastos, but also by a great number of secondary authors. He lived throughout the fifth and fourth centuries, BCE, and was most likely the first philosopher to try to rationalize the system of the Earth, Sun, and Moon by the use of geometry and mathematics. Anaximander was also said to have created the first map of the world, however, like much of the rest of his works, this has been lost since his time. There is, however, documentation of Anaximander being responsible for the conception of the first mechanical model of the world, which is outlined by a geocentric model. He postulated that the Earth was at the center of the universe, and that its shape was convex and cylindrical, with life existing on one of the two flat sides. Beyond the Earth, sits the other planets, which Anaximander also details the order of. Next are the fixed stars, which he regarded as wheel-like condensations of air filled with fire, provided at certain places with openings through which flames are discharged. Anaximander places the Moon beyond these stars, and assumed it to also be wheel-like in shape, being nineteen times the size of Earth. Finally, on the top of the universe is the Sun, which interacts with the Moon, and the relationship between them is described in terms of aperture, in which a stoppage in would lead to eclipses.

In this model, the Sun is a ring, 28 times the size of the Earth, with a hollow rim, filled with fire, which at a certain place is seen through an aperture as in a pair of bellows. He also postulated regarding the formation of thunder and lightning, maintaining that they are caused by the wind becoming compressed inside a thick cloud and suddenly breaking through, causing the loud sound to be heard as the cloud is bursting. He claimed the fissure then looked like a spark because of the contrast with the dark cloud. Anaximander's model set a precedent for succeeding theories, including Copernicus's system, with the major change being the shift away from the geocentric model and towards the heliocentric model of the universe. The explained model, although accredited to Anaximander, did necessarily take from ideas originated in foreign cultures, such as the astronomical wheels which are known from Persian cosmology. But even without detailed commentary, these elements of the Anaximander tradition give a strong impression of an original and courageous thinker making conscious efforts towards producing a rational explanation of fundamental physical principles, the nature and motion of heavenly bodies, the shape of Earth, its place in the universe, etc.

== Early views of cosmos ==
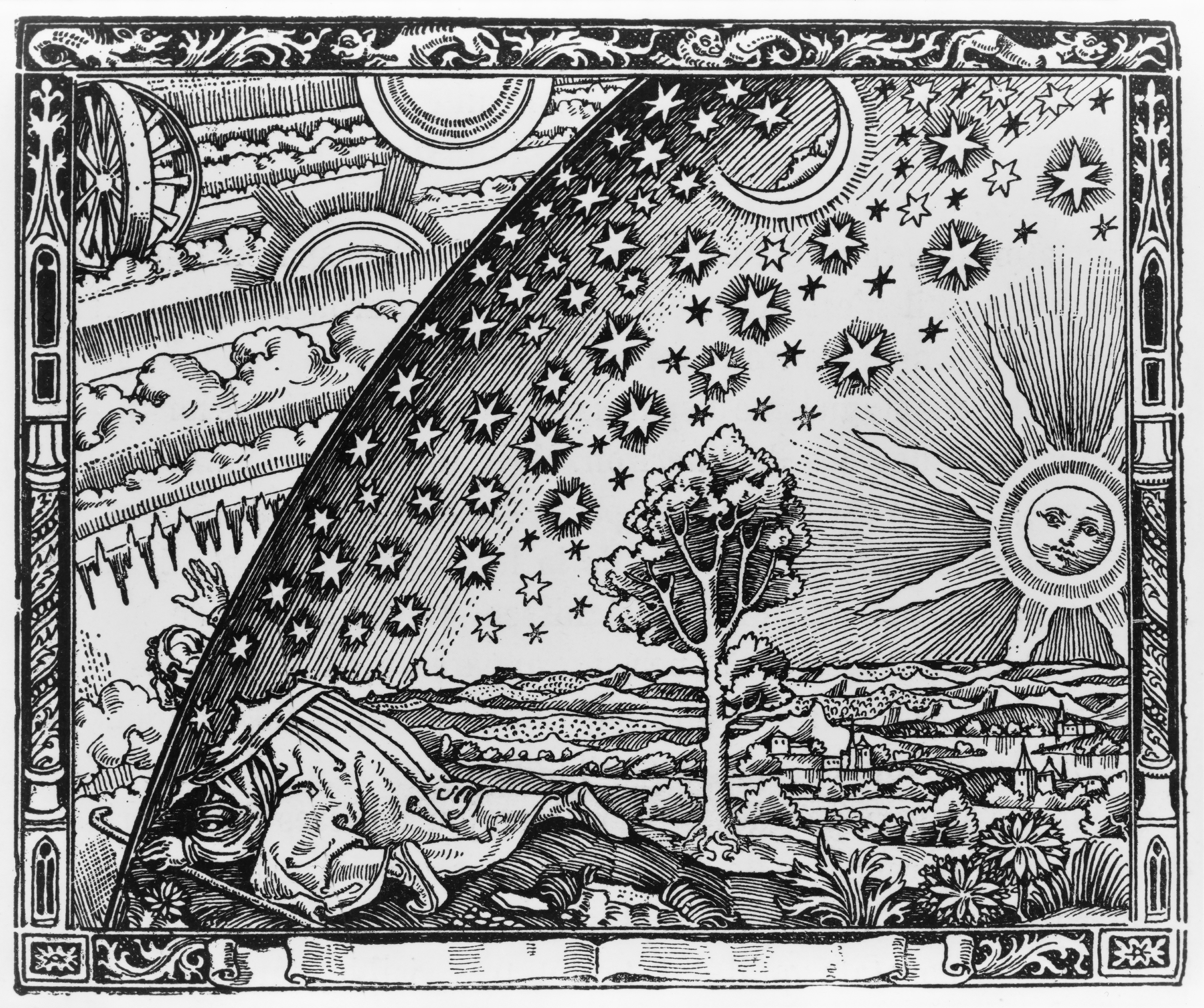
Flammarion engraving, Paris, 1888

Eastern and Western thought differed greatly in their understanding of space and the organization of the cosmos. The Chinese saw the Cosmos as empty, infinite, and intertwined with the Earth. Western ideas, based on the ancient Greeks' understanding of the cosmos, believed in a multi-planar divided cosmos that was finite and filled with air.

=== European view ===
Early Europeans viewed the cosmos as a divinely created, spatially finite, bifurcated cosmos, divided into sublunary and superlunary realms. Objects above the lunar disc were believed to be stable, with heavenly bodies believed to be made out of a refined substance called "quintessence". This was understood to be a crystalline, completely transparent substance that held all of the superlunary spheres in perfect order. After their creation by God, these spheres did not change except for their rotation above the Earth. Objects below the lunar sphere were subject to constant combination, separation, and recombination. This was because they consisted of the chaotic elements of earth, air, fire, and water.

The idea of celestial spheres was developed in the cosmological models of Plato, Eudoxus, Aristotle, Ptolemy, Copernicus, and others. They believed in a stable cosmos created by God, where distinct realms were subject to different kinds of order. Some Europeans maintained the Aristotelian view that infinity could only be seen as an attribute of God, with the cosmos being finite. Furthermore, following the Aristotelian view that "nature abhors a vacuum", some Europeans believed that the space between the spheres were filled with air. This theory persisted until the Scientific Revolution, when the discovery that the Sun was in the center of the planetary system rocked cosmological understanding to its core. Other theories such as Atomism posited a void of atoms as the fundamental elements of physics, while Stoicism postulated a void allowing for the cosmos to expand and contract in volume through its cycles.

=== Chinese view ===
The Chinese had multiple theories of the processes and components of the cosmos. The most popular of these beliefs was the Xuan Ye theory, the astronomical view of the cosmos as an infinite space with floating pieces of condensed vapor. The Chinese believed that the Earth consisted of condensed yin and the heavens of yang; and that these properties coexisted in constant relation to each other, with yin and yang being used together to explain processes on Earth as well of those relating the Earth in conjunction with the heavens. This idea was described by Joseph Needham as a cosmos that functioned similarly to a complex organism, with discernible patterns in an ever-changing structure. There was both a pattern and a randomness to the cosmos. Because of this, the Chinese believed that earthly phenomena could affect heavenly bodies.

The Chinese believed that qi was the substance of all things in the cosmos and Earth, including inanimate matter, humans, ideas, emotions, celestial bodies and everything that exists or has existed; and that it was qi condensing that created all the matter within the cosmos. This is relatively consistent with the modern understanding of the congregation of matter through gravitational fields.

The Chinese held a belief associated with the Xuan Ye theory, which held space as both empty and infinite. This was inconsistent with the Aristotelian concepts that nature would not contain a vacuum, and that infinity could only be a divine attribute. The idea of the nothingness of space was later recognized as one of the most important discoveries of modern science.

=== Indian view ===
The Hindus believed in a cyclic universe related to three other beliefs: (i), time is endless and space has infinite extension; (ii), earth is not the center of the universe; and (iii), laws govern all development, including the creation and destruction of the universe. The Indians believed that there were three types of space, physiological, physical, and infinite space. The infinite space consists of undivided consciousness and everything that is inside and outside. However, finite division of space is where time begins, and the division of time is where all beings were first created. It was believed that there are connections between the physical and the psychological worlds, and an equivalence existed between the outer cosmos and the inner cosmos of the individual. This is expressed in the famous sentence – yat pinḍe tad brahmṇḍe, "as in the body so in the universe".

The ancient Indians mapped out the outer world or the universe at an altar where Yajurveda listed multiples of ten that reached ten million. The numbers used to count to ten million was used as a reference to show the relation of the planets in the universe to Earth, it was not a relevant scale to the entire universe, therefore backing that they believed the universe to be infinite and endless. The Indians calculated the speed of light to be four thousand four hundred and four (4,404) yojanas per nimesa, or about one hundred eighty six thousand (186,000) miles per second. Ancient Indian beliefs also included the belief that the Earth was created after certain stars, these stars include the Sun, Gemini, Aja, and Kurma. Evidence from the Etymological considerations prove this belief and also points towards the discovery of the twin asses, which in western astrology can be found next to each other in the constellation Cancer as Asellus Borealis and Asellus Australis.

The Indian cyclic model assumes the existence of countless island universes, which go through their own periods of development and destruction. The conception of cyclicity is taken to be recursive. For an early exposition of these astronomical and cosmological ideas, one may read al-Bīrūnī's classic history of Indian science, composed in 1030 AD, and for an even earlier, popular, view of Indian ideas, one may consult the Vedantic text called the Yoga Vāsiṣṭha (YV), which at 32,000 shlokas is one of the longest books in world literature.

=== Australian view ===
Australian cosmology has a vast and varied history.

Australian cosmology beliefs were based around the Aboriginal and Torres Strait Islander people's ideas, also known as Indigenous astronomy, and it was around before the Babylonians, Greeks, and the Renaissance period. They found ways to observe the Moon, stars, and the Sun, this enabled them to create a sense of time. This also allowed them to navigate across the continent, create calendars, and predict the weather. One of the most important constellations in Australia for the Aboriginal people is the Emu. The Emu constellation represents the connection between the earth and the sky, and stories and representations of their constellations were written on some cave walls in Australia. Another indigenous tribe known as the Euahlayi saw the Milky Way as a river and between the two bright sides represented a Galactic Bulge where the two sons of the creator Baiame and the river made a connection from the earth and the sky. The Yolngu people were one of the first to discover how the tide of the ocean works. They discovered the tide had a direct correlation with the Moon. Their reasoning as to why the ocean did not fill up as much as perhaps when the Moon was full versus a crescent moon is because the Moon was not as full either. This contradicts the father of science, Galileo, who said that the tides correlated with the Earth's orbit around the Sun. Multiple indigenous tribes described winter by the Seven Sisters, a group of stars in the sky that provided hunter-gatherers a sort of calendar to indicate whether they should be hunting or gathering, based on the season.

=== Similarities in observation ===
There is one way that both the Chinese and the Europeans, along with countless other ancient societies, related to the cosmos. This was through meaning, placed on celestial bodies, that were observed moving above the Earth. The Chinese had a very complex astronomical understanding of the stars and the cosmos that influenced everything from their art and architecture to their myths and science. This was also true of the Greeks and Romans, whose 48 constellations, including the zodiac signs and the constellation of Orion, have been passed down to modern Western cultures. These were likely passed down to them from ancient Babylonian and Egyptian astronomers. Copernicus is said to have been inspired by the fecund sun deity of neoplatonic thought, which may have initially inspired his vision of a heliocentric universe.

=== Copernican Revolution ===
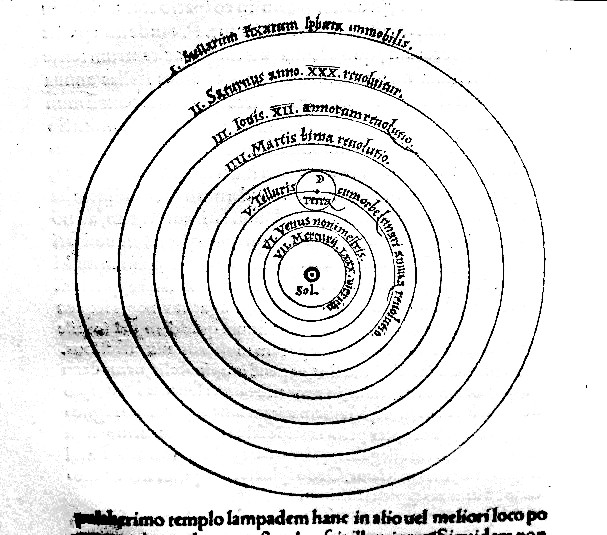
Copernicus' Heliocentric Solar System

Commonly regarded as the foundation of modern astronomy, the common universal view of the cosmos shifted as Nicolaus Copernicus positioned the Sun as the center of the Universe.

=== Early beliefs ===
Prior to the Copernican Revolution, the Ptolemaic system, also known as the geocentric model, was widely accepted. This put the Earth at the center of the universe, with the Sun and other planets revolving around the Earth in an epicyclic orbit. Aristotle's geocentric model was also broadly acknowledged, along with his claim that the planets rotated but did not orbit. The reasoning behind this was due to the belief that all objects outside of the lunar sphere were celestial bodies, and therefore could not change, as they were made of quintessence.

There were notable critiques of this model prior to Copernicus. In the Islamic world, Ibn al-Haytham doubted Ptolemy's notion of the planetary orbits, and Muhammad al-Battani recalculated the parameters. However, both still agreed with the geocentric model.

One of the first known astronomers that supported the Heliocentric theory was Aristarchus of Samos. After observing a lunar eclipse, he came to the conclusion that the Sun was farther away from Earth than the Moon and that the Sun was much larger than Earth. He also claimed the Sun was a star. While Aristarchus was later an influence on Copernicus and his groundbreaking work, prior to the 17th century Aristarchus' findings were obstructed by the more established theories of Ptolemy and Aristotle.

=== Copernican theory ===
Astronomer and mathematician Nicolaus Copernicus was appointed by the Catholic Church as an official, as his uncle was a bishop in the church. He used his income to further his studies, eventually studying at the University of Bologna in Italy. Copernicus began doubting the knowledge of natural philosophers and their beliefs, claiming that geometrical astronomy instead would result in the true reality of the cosmos. His manuscript, De revolutionibus, pioneered ideas that would change the course of how both the cosmos and astrology were viewed. Most notably, Copernicus claimed that the Sun was the stationary center of the universe. His work also included calculations on the motions of the Moon, and the motions in latitude and longitude of the planets, all which orbit the Sun. Copernicus' work was not immediately published as it disagreed with Biblical teachings, and he feared his work would be rejected by Catholic officials.

=== Neoplatonism ===
Copernicus' work was not entirely mathematical conviction. There is evidence that Copernicus was influenced by neoplatonism. Founded by philosopher Plotinus, neoplatonism believes that the Sun is the symbol of The One, or The Universal Soul. It would make sense then that Copernicus would place the god-like figure at the center of the universe. Neoplatonist Nicholas of Cusa claimed the universe was infinite, containing multiple earths and suns. This changed the belief of a finite universe to an infinite one, which emphasized a more obscure and incomplete version of God.

== Cosmology ==
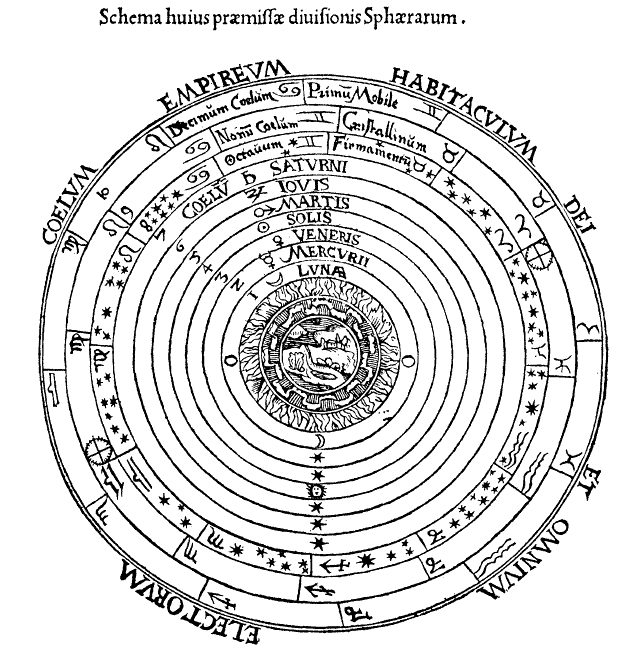
The Ancient and Medieval cosmos as depicted in Peter Apian's Cosmographia (Antwerp, 1539)

Cosmology is the study of the cosmos, and in its broadest sense covers a variety of very different approaches: scientific, religious and philosophical. All cosmologies have in common an attempt to understand the implicit order within the whole of being. In this way, most religions and philosophical systems have a cosmology.

When cosmology is used without a qualifier, it often signifies physical cosmology, unless the context makes clear that a different meaning is intended.

=== Physical cosmology ===
Physical cosmology (often simply described as 'cosmology') is the scientific study of the universe, from the beginning of its physical existence. It includes speculative concepts such as a multiverse, when these are being discussed. In physical cosmology, the term cosmos is often used in a technical way, referring to a particular spacetime continuum within a (postulated) multiverse. The particular cosmos in which humans live, the observable universe, is generally capitalized as the Cosmos.

In physical cosmology, the uncapitalized term cosmic signifies a subject with a relationship to the universe, such as 'cosmic time' (time since the Big Bang), 'cosmic rays' (high energy particles or radiation detected from space), and 'cosmic microwave background' (microwave radiation detectable from all directions in space).

According to Charles Peter Mason in Sir William Smith Dictionary of Greek and Roman Biography and Mythology (1870, see book screenshot for full quote), Pythagoreans described the universe.

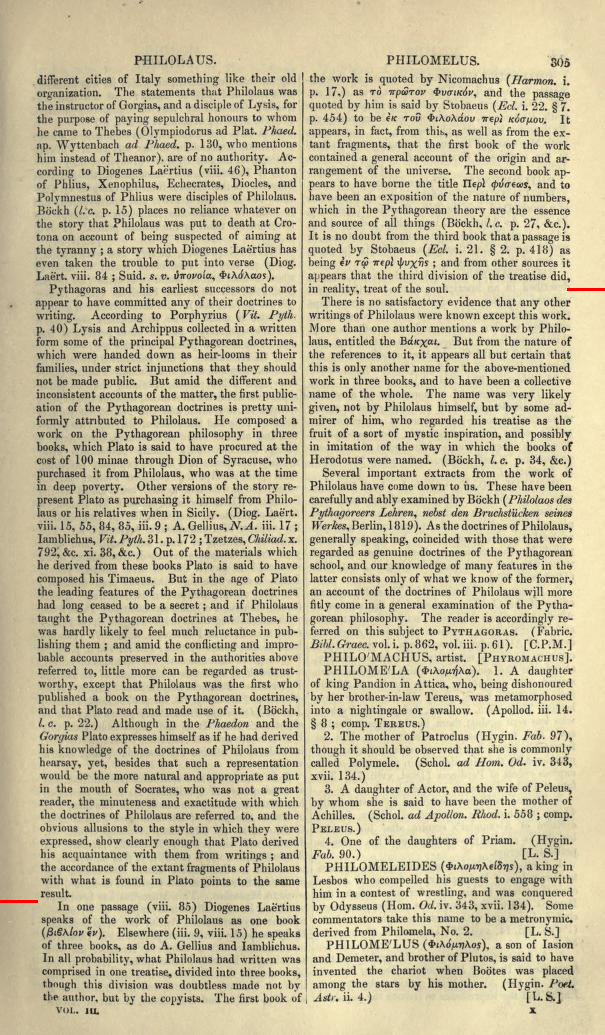
Excerpt from Philolaus Pythagoras book (Charles Peter Mason, 1870)

It appears, in fact, from this, as well as from the extant fragments, that the first book (from Philolaus) of the work contained a general account of the origin and arrangement of the universe. The second book appears to have been an exposition of the nature of numbers, which in the Pythagorean theory are the essence and source of all things. (p. 305)

In September 2023, astrophysicists questioned the overall current view of the universe, in the form of the Standard Model of Cosmology, based on the latest James Webb Space Telescope studies.

In October 2023, astronomers proposed a new, more comprehensive, view of the cosmos, and which includes all objects in the universe, and suggested that the universe may have begun with instantons, and may be a black hole.

=== Philosophical cosmology ===
Cosmology is a branch of metaphysics that deals with the nature of the universe, a theory or doctrine describing the natural order of the universe. The basic definition of Cosmology is the science of the origin and development of the universe. In modern astronomy, the Big Bang theory is the dominant postulation.

Philosophy of cosmology is an expanding discipline, directed to the conceptual foundations of cosmology and the philosophical contemplation of the universe as a totality. It draws on the fundamental theories of physics – thermodynamics, statistical mechanics, quantum mechanics, quantum field theory, and special and general relativity – and on several branches of philosophy – philosophy of physics, philosophy of science, metaphysics, philosophy of mathematics, and epistemology.

=== Religious cosmology ===
In theology, the cosmos is the created heavenly bodies (Sun, Moon, wandering stars, and fixed stars). The concept of cosmos as the created universe and its arrangement has been important in Christendom since its very inception, as it is heavily used in the New Testament and occurs over 180 times. In Christian theology, the word is sometimes used synonymously with aion to refer to "worldly life" or "this world" or "this age" as opposed to the afterlife or world to come, although "aion/aeon" is also at times used in a more other-worldly sense as the eternal plane of the divine.

== See also ==
- Carl Sagan
  - Cosmos (Carl Sagan book)
  - Cosmos: A Personal Voyage, 1980
  - Cosmos: A Spacetime Odyssey, 2014
  - Cosmos: Possible Worlds, 2020
- Cosmic View
- Cosmic Zoom
- Cosmonaut
- Cosmicism
- Cosmogony
- Cosmogram
- Cosmography
- Macrocosm and microcosm
- Megaverse (disambiguation)
- Oikeiôsis (Stoic cosmopolitanism)
- Omega point (de Chardin)
- Omniverse (disambiguation)
- Rerikhism
- Russian cosmism
