= Multiverse (disambiguation) =

The multiverse is the hypothetical set of multiple possible universes that comprise all of reality.

Multiverse may also refer to:

== Concept ==
=== In fiction ===
- Multiverse in fiction, the general concept of a multiverse in fictional settings
  - Multiverse (DC Comics), the multiverse used by DC Comics
  - Multiverse (Marvel Comics), the multiverse used by Marvel Comics
    - Multiverse (Marvel Cinematic Universe), the multiverse as depicted in the Marvel Cinematic Universe
  - Multiverse (Magic: The Gathering), the universe of Magic: The Gathering
  - Multiverse (Michael Moorcock), the multiverse of Michael Moorcock
    - Michael Moorcock's Multiverse, a comic book series by Michael Moorcock
  - The Multiverse, the central concept of the Dungeons and Dragons Planescape setting
  - Multiverse series, a series of three novels by David Weber and Linda Evans, and Joelle Presby
  - MultiVersus, a crossover fighting game with characters from multiple Warner Bros. Discovery properties
  - Mila in the Multiverse, a Brazilian science fiction television series produced by Nonstop and Boutique Filmes for The Walt Disney Company

== Computing ==
- Multiverse Network, an American software company
- Multiverse Foundation, a non-profit foundation continuing the work of the Multiverse Network
- Multiverse, a package classification for Ubuntu
- Multiverse (video games), a collection of interconnected virtual worlds that allows users to travel within and between these worlds

== Music ==
- Multiverse Music, a British music publisher

=== Albums ===
- Multiverse, a 2012 progressive house album by Jaytech
- Multiverse (album), a 2022 hip hop album by Wiz Khalifa

== Other uses ==
- Multiverse (company), a British educational technology company
- Multiverse (professional wrestling), a professional wrestling event promoted by Impact Wrestling
- Multiverse (set theory), a view that there are many equally valid models of set theory

== See also ==
- Parallel universe (disambiguation)
- Omniverse (disambiguation)
- Megaverse (disambiguation)
- Universe (disambiguation)
