= Universum =

Universum may refer to:

- Universum (journal), an academic journal
- Universum (magazine), an Austrian popular science magazine
- Universum (building), on the campus of Umeå University, Sweden
- Universum (band), an Australian melodic death metal band
- Universum Science Center, a science museum in Bremen, Germany
- Universum Film, a film company that was the principal film studio in Germany
- Universum (UNAM), a science museum with the National Autonomous University of Mexico
- Am Universum Amorphis' fifth studio album
- Vi veri universum vivus vici, a Latin phrase meaning: "By the power of truth, I, while living, have conquered the universe"
- Kino Universum

== See also ==
- Universe (disambiguation)
