= Youniverse =

Youniverse may refer to:

- Youniverse (Rob Brown album), 1992
  - "Youniverse", title track from album above
- Youniverse (Sawthis album), 2013
- "Youniverse" (song), 2016 song by Swedish singer Molly Sandén from Melodifestivalen 2016

== See also ==
- Universe (disambiguation)
