= Parallel =

Parallel may refer to:

== Mathematics ==
- Parallel (geometry), two lines in the Euclidean plane which never intersect
- Parallel (operator), mathematical operation named after the composition of electrical resistance in parallel circuits

== Science and engineering ==
- Parallel (latitude), an imaginary east–west line circling a globe
- Parallel of declination, used in astronomy
- Parallel, a geometric term of location meaning "in the same direction"
- Parallel electrical circuits

== Computing ==
- Parallel computing
- Parallel (software), a UNIX utility for running programs in parallel

== Language ==
- Parallelism (grammar), a balance of two or more similar words, phrases, or clauses
- Parallelism (rhetoric)

== Entertainment ==
- Parallel (manga)
- Parallel (2018 film), a Canadian science fiction thriller film
- Parallel (2024 film) an American science fiction thriller film
- Parallel (video), a compilation of music videos by R.E.M.
- Parallel (The Black Dog album), 1995
- Parallel (Four Tet album)
- Parallel (EP), a 2017 EP by GFriend
- "The Parallel", an episode of the TV series The Twilight Zone

== Music ==
- Parallel harmony, a music composition technic
- Parallel key

== Other uses ==
- Parallel, a type of trench; see Siege#Age of gunpowder
- Avinguda del Paral·lel
- Parallel (filling stations), an operator in Ukraine's oil wholesale and retail markets
- Paral·lel station, a Barcelona Metro station

== See also ==
- Parallels (disambiguation)
- Parallel lines (disambiguation)
- Parallel universe (disambiguation)
- Parallel World (disambiguation)
