= Tales of the Baroness =

- Created by: Nelson Chan; Sarah Slean
- Country of origin: Canada

Production
- Running time: Episode I - approx. 5 min. per episode

Original release
- Network: Bravo!
- Release: May 11, 2007

Tales of the Baroness, a three-part animated short film. Musician Sarah Slean teamed up with video director Nelson Chan of Mary, Day One in this series. It is about a young girl named Georgina hoping to cure a cursed nunnery with her scientific skills, while encountering the legendary Baroness.

The first segment aired May 11, 2007 on Bravo!FACT Presents.
