= Sarah Slean EP =

Sarah Slean

EP by Sarah Slean
- Released: 2001
- Genre: Rock
- Label: Atlantic
- Producer: Sarah Slean

Sarah Slean chronology
Blue Parade (1998)	Sarah Slean (2001)	Night Bugs (2002)

Professional ratings
Review scores
Source	Rating
Allmusic	link

Sarah Slean is an EP by Sarah Slean, featuring three new tracks and four from her back catalogue. The three new tracks would be released the following year on her debut album on Atlantic Records, Night Bugs. The four older tracks are taken from Blue Parade and Universe.

== Track listing ==
1. "Eliot" - 4:24
2. "Book Smart, Street Stupid" - 4:47
3. "Sweet Ones" - (a promotional version of this EP features "Bank Accounts" on Track 3) - 3:06
4. "High" - from ''Blue Parade - 3:34
5. "Twin Moon" - from Blue Parade - 5:04
6. "Me & Jerome" - from Universe - 3:25
7. "John the 23rd" - from Universe - 4:30
