= Orphan Music =

Studio album by Sarah Slean
- Released: October 31, 2006
- Genre: Pop Rock
- Label: WEA

Sarah Slean chronology
Day One (2002)	Orphan Music (2006)	The Baroness (2008)

Orphan Music is the first official live album by Canadian singer, songwriter, and pianist Sarah Slean, released on October 31, 2006

Also contains six b-sides, of which two ("Lucky Me" and "Pilgrim") are also included in the live set.

Performances were culled from live concerts recorded in December 2005 in Toronto (Harbourfront Theatre) and Vancouver (Vancouver East Cultural Centre) as well as stripped down studio recordings at DNA Studios in Toronto and Kensaltown Studios in London, UK.

The UK recordings were produced by Martin Terefe (Ron Sexsmith, KT Tunstall)

== Track listing ==
1. "Lucky Me"
2. "Somebody's Arms"
3. "Eliot" with Blue Spruce Quartet
4. "Mary"
5. "Last Years' War" with Blue Spruce Quartet
6. "Out in the Park"
7. "Pilgrim"
8. "Narcolepsy Weed" with Blue Spruce Quartet
9. "The Score"
10. "Weight (DNA Studio)"
11. "Wilderness (Kensaltown Studio)"
12. "Little London Night (Kensaltown Studio)"
13. "California (DNA Studio)"
14. "Lucky Me (DNA Studio)"
15. "Pilgrim (DNA Studio)"
- All songs by Sarah Slean
- Published by Sarah Slean (SOCAN) 2006
