= Metaverse (disambiguation) =

Metaverse is the sum of all virtual spaces.

Metaverse may also refer to:

== Fiction ==
- The virtual reality world in the 1992 novel Snow Crash by Neal Stephenson, the first use of the term
- Fictional universe, with multiple alternate timelines
- Prime Earth in the DC Universe
- DA Metaverse, a music project of Daisuke Asakura
- The Metaverse, a supernatural dimension derived from the collective unconscious in Persona 5

== Non-fiction ==
- Facebook Metaverse, now known as Horizon Worlds
- Zompist.com, aka "The Metaverse", a constructed languages website
- Decentraland, a 3D virtual world browser-based platform

== See also ==
- Megaverse (disambiguation)
- Omniverse (disambiguation)
- Universe (disambiguation)
- Meta (disambiguation)
- Verse (disambiguation)
