= Light and Darkness (album) =

Studio album by Perseo Miranda
- Released: June 4, 2006
- Genre: Gothic metal; heavy metal
- Label: Lodger

Perseo Miranda chronology
I Sayd I Look Away! (1981)	Light and Darkness (2006)	Evolution of the Spirit (2007)

Light and Darkness is the third album by Italian singer and songwriter Perseo Miranda. It contains 12 tracks and was released on June 4, 2006, by Lodger Records.

== Track listing ==
1. "Light and Darkness"
2. "It's a Reality"
3. "Have Fire with the Fire"
4. "The Choice of Sin"
5. "The Power of the Silence"
6. "Where Is the Answer"
7. "The Doors Are closed"
8. "My Reason"
9. "The Feast of the Sun"
10. "Crucified"
11. "Relative Conceptions"
12. "Positive or Negative"
