= Perseo Miranda =

Italian musician (born 1958)

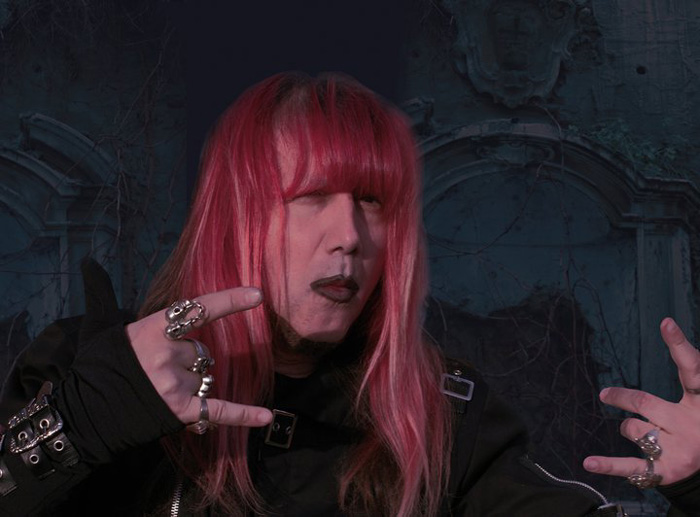

Background information
- Born: Angelo Spaggiari; 15 April 1958 (age 68); Italy
- Genres: Gothic metal, hard rock, heavy metal, progressive rock
- Occupations: Musician, songwriter
- Instrument: Vocals
- Years active: 1980–present
- Website: www.perseononsolorock.com

Perseo Miranda (born Angelo Spaggiari, 15 April 1958) is an Italian vocalist and songwriter, and founder of the heavy metal band Perseo Miranda.

He has been active since 1980 but only in the 2000s obtained a discrete attention in the music scene.

== Biography ==
He started in 1980 participating in various radio show (in particular Italian channels ‘’Rai 2’’ and ‘’Rai 3’’), but his main passion was the music, which he regards as the main means of expression. He found inspiration in artists like Alice Cooper, David Bowie and Black Sabbath.

In 1980, he released his first self-produced album, called Perseo Miranda and His Theatre, and the following year the CD single "I sayd I look away".

Then Miranda devoted himself to teaching guitar in various schools, recording some vocals in many pop rock albums and playing in many different bands (from hard rock to heavy metal, punk, gothic metal, blues and other genres).

He returned to the music scene in 2006, releasing the album Light and Darkness

Some Italian webzines, as Metallized.it, described it as a "classic heavy metal album with strong dark and gothic influences".

In 2007, Miranda released the album Evolution of the spirits and in 2008 Parallel Dimensions. The last one had some good reviews: Italian webzine OndaAlternativa noted some changes in the style, moving from gothic metal to a kind of "trash-prog metal".Powermetal.it described this work as hard rock music with modern ideas, especially in the guitar work.
In 2010, Miranda signed for the Italian label Erga Edizioni. Praise my day was the first Miranda's album produced by Erga Edizioni.

This album gained attention from some Italian magazines. Rock Hard said that "Miranda is one of the few artists that really sings and interprets in different ways, depending on the song atmosphere".

Under the same label, Miranda released in 2011 the single CD (2 tracks) A silence that screams-In a Broken dreams, and some months later the CD A Silence That Screams. Some reviews such as Italia di Metallo judicated it as a pure heavy metal work with dark and progressive episodes.

Metal Maniac magazine judicated it as a hard and complex album, with hard rock-heavy metal songs, but also progressive sounds.

The title track "A Silence That Screams", was also included in the Inferno Sounds compilation, attached to Inferno Rock magazine.

== Other projects ==
Miranda wrote 2 books in the field of astrology: Manuale di astrologia (translated Astrology Manual) (2001– Erga Edizioni) and Gli astri dicono (translated Aster says (2003 – Erga Edizioni).

== Discography ==
- Perseo Miranda – Perseo Miranda and his Theatre (1980 – self produced)
- Perseo Miranda – I Sayd I Look Away! (1981 – self produced)
- Perseo Miranda – Light and darkness (2006 – self produced)
- Perseo Miranda – Evolution of the Spirit (2007 – self produced)
- Perseo Miranda – Parallel dimensions (2008 – Lodger Records)
- Perseo Miranda – Praise my Day (2009, Erga Edizioni)
- Perseo Miranda – A silence that screams, in a broken dream (CD single,2010, Erga Edizioni)
- Perseo Miranda – A Silence That Screams (2010, Erga Edizioni)
- Perseo Miranda – Firmament (2011, Erga Edizioni)
- Perseo Miranda – Theatre Metal – the Armed Poet (2012, Erga Edizioni)
- Perseo Miranda – Theatre Metal (2012, Erga Edizioni)

=== Guest ===
- Inferno Sounds vol.1 (2010, Inferno Rock) (with the song "A silence that Screams")
