= The Baroness (album) =

Studio album by Sarah Slean
- Released: March 11, 2008 (Canada)
- Genre: Piano pop
- Length: 46:33
- Label: Warner Music
- Producer: Jagori Tanna and Sarah Slean

Sarah Slean chronology
Orphan Music (2006)	The Baroness (2008)	The Baroness Redecorates (2008)

Singles from The Baroness
- 1. "Get Home" Released: 2008

The Baroness is the fourth studio album by Canadian singer-songwriter and pianist Sarah Slean, released on March 11, 2008.

== Track listing ==
All songs by Sarah Slean. All strings arranged and conducted by Sarah Slean. All horns arranged by Sarah Slean.

1. "Hopeful Hearts" – 3:32
2. "Get Home" – 3:42
3. "Euphoria" – 3:13
4. "Goodnight Trouble" – 4:38
5. "Notes from the Underground" – 4:03
6. "Sound of Water / Change Your Mind" – 4:14
7. "No Place at All" – 3:58
8. "Please Be Good to Me" – 4:04
9. "Willow" – 3:31
10. "So Many Miles" – 3:35
11. "Shadowland" – 4:07
12. "Looking for Someone" – 3:51

=== Bonus tracks ===
1. "Get Home" (Demo) – Was available for download when signing up for the new official mailing list.
2. "Parasol" – Available for download after pre-ordering the album through Sarahslean.com.
3. "The Rose" – Available on iTunes and The Baroness Redecorates.
4. "Lonely Side of the Moon" – Available on iTunes and The Baroness Redecorates.
