= Parallels =

Parallels may refer to:

- Circle of latitude (also parallels), an abstract east–west small circle connecting all locations around Earth at a given latitude
- Parallels (company), a software company based in Schaffhausen, Switzerland.
  - Parallels Desktop for Mac, software providing hardware virtualization for Macintosh computers with Intel processors
  - Parallels Server for Mac, server-side desktop virtualization product built for the Mac OS X Server platform
  - Parallels Workstation, first commercial software product released by Parallels, Inc.
- Parallels (engineering), rectangular blocks of metal which have faces ground or lapped to a precise surface finish

== Arts & entertainment ==
- British Blockade (also Parallels), a patience game or solitaire of the blockade family
- Parallels (album), the sixth studio album by American progressive metal band Fates Warning
- Parallels (band), a Canadian synthpop band from Toronto
- Parallels (film), a 2015 American science-fiction adventure film
- Parallels (TV series), a French science-fiction-mystery streaming television series for children and adolescents
- "Parallels" (Star Trek: The Next Generation), the 11th episode of the seventh season of the American science fiction television series
- "Parallels", song by As I Lay Dying from the album The Powerless Rise, 2010
- "Parallels", song by Fit for a King from the album Descendants, 2011
- "Parallels", song by Misery Signals from the album Controller, 2008
- "Parallels", song by Yes from the album Going for the One

== See also ==
- Parallel (disambiguation)
