= Evolution of the Spirit =

Studio album by Perseo Miranda
- Released: May 4, 2007
- Genre: Gothic metal; heavy metal
- Label: Lodger

Perseo Miranda chronology
Light and Darkness (2006)	Evolution of the Spirit (2007)	Parallel Dimensions (2008)

Evolution of the Spirit is the fourth album by Italian singer-songwriter Perseo Miranda. It contains four tracks in gothic metal style.

== Track listing ==
1. "Evolution of the Spirit, Part 1"
2. "Evolution of the Spirit, Part 2"
3. "The Questions"
4. "Past, Present and Future"
