= Sarah Slean =

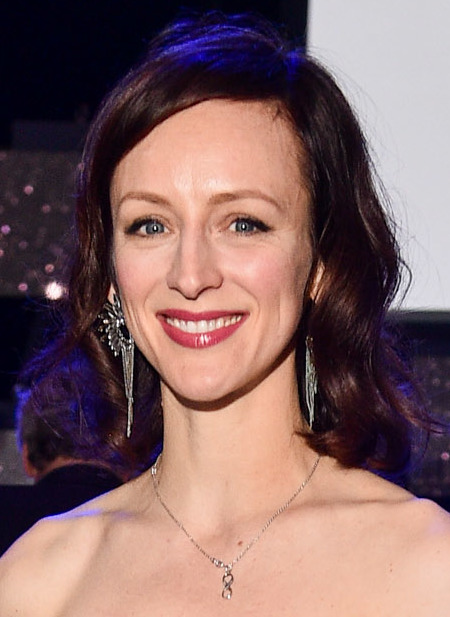
- Slean in 2018

Background information
- Born: Sarah Hope Slean; 21 June 1977 (age 49); Pickering, Ontario, Canada
- Genres: Pop, pop rock, art rock, new classical, film scoring
- Occupations: Musician, composer, vocalist, songwriter
- Instruments: Vocals, keyboard instruments
- Years active: 1997–present
- Labels: WEA, Atlantic
- Website: SarahSlean.com

Sarah Hope Slean (born June 21, 1977) is a Canadian singer-songwriter, composer and musician. She has released eleven albums to date (including EPs and live albums). She is also a poet, visual artist, and occasional actress.

== Career ==
=== Major recordings ===
Slean recorded her first EP Universe (1997) at the age of nineteen. It was followed by Blue Parade in 1998. Night Bugs was her first major label album, co-produced by Slean and Hawksley Workman, and released by WEA in Canada and Atlantic Records in the United States. It was heavily inspired by cabaret music. Slean composed all the string and horn arrangements for these albums - by hand in traditional notation.

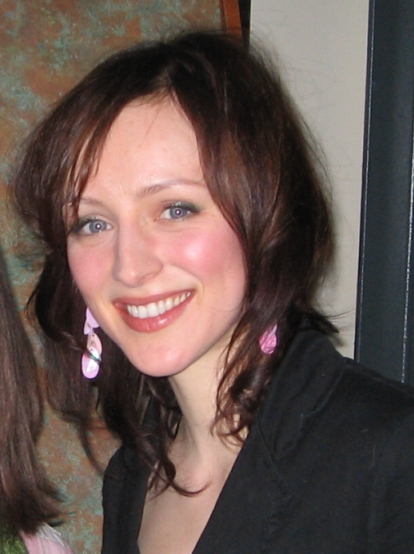
Slean in 2005

On 28 September 2004, Slean released her fourth album, Day One. Here Slean's piano takes a less important spot for the first time in her career. The focus is more on beats, rhythms and guitar, which is evident in the album's first single, "Lucky Me". The up-tempo title track "Day One", and "Mary", a song about Slean's grandmother, were released as the second and third singles. Slean was first introduced to VS orchestral libraries and MIDI sequencing on this album, and composed all the orchestral accompaniments.

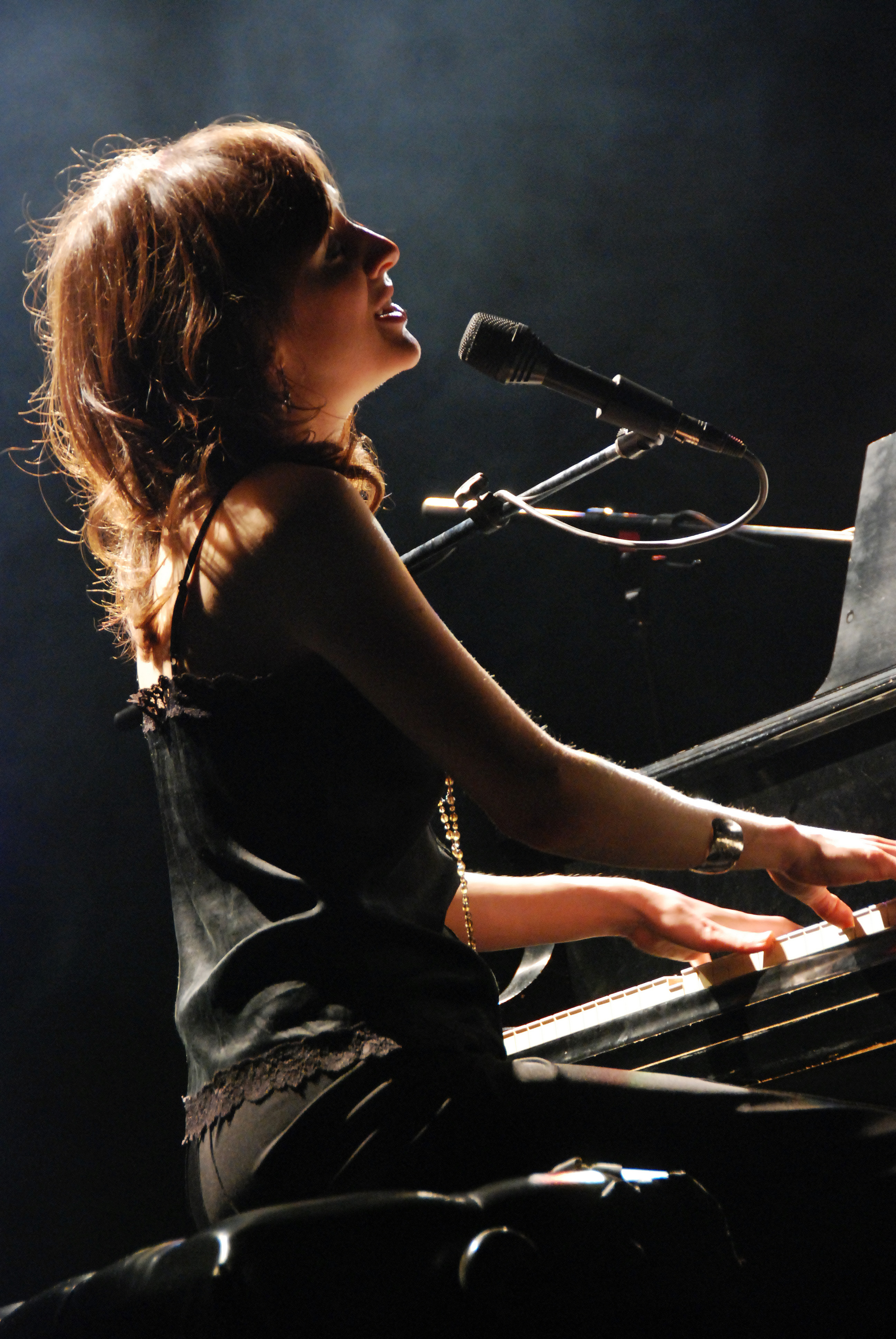
Sarah Slean performing in Edmonton, Alberta in 2006

In October 2006, Slean released a mostly-live album, Orphan Music, which consists of songs recorded live at Toronto's Harbourfront Theatre and the Vancouver East Cultural Centre. Other new tracks featuring Slean and the piano were recorded at DNA Recording Facility in Toronto and Kensaltown Studios in the UK.

On 13 December 2007, Slean's website underwent a massive overhaul in preparation for her newest studio album, entitled The Baroness. Visitors to the new site were invited to sign up for Slean's new mailing list, and in doing so would be able to download a demo version of her newest single, "Get Home". People who pre-ordered the new album from the new website's store also received a download to the non-album track "Parasol". The Baroness was released on 11 March 2008. The iTunes version of the album included two additional non-album tracks, "The Rose" and "The Lonely Side of the Moon." In September 2008, Slean announced her intention to release the non-album tracks from The Baroness as an EP. Both Parasol and Modern Man have been confirmed by Slean in Question and Answer sessions in her official website. On 13 November 2008, the official Sarahslean.com newsletter announced the title for the EP to be The Baroness Redecorates. A full track list was also provided.

Slean released her fifth studio album, a double album entitled Land & Sea, on 27 September 2011. As previously with Beauty Lives, a 100 special handcrafted editions were sold of the album. Land & Sea is also Slean's first record to be released on vinyl. Sarah composed the orchestral arrangements for three songs and her mentor Jonathan Goldsmith arranged three others .

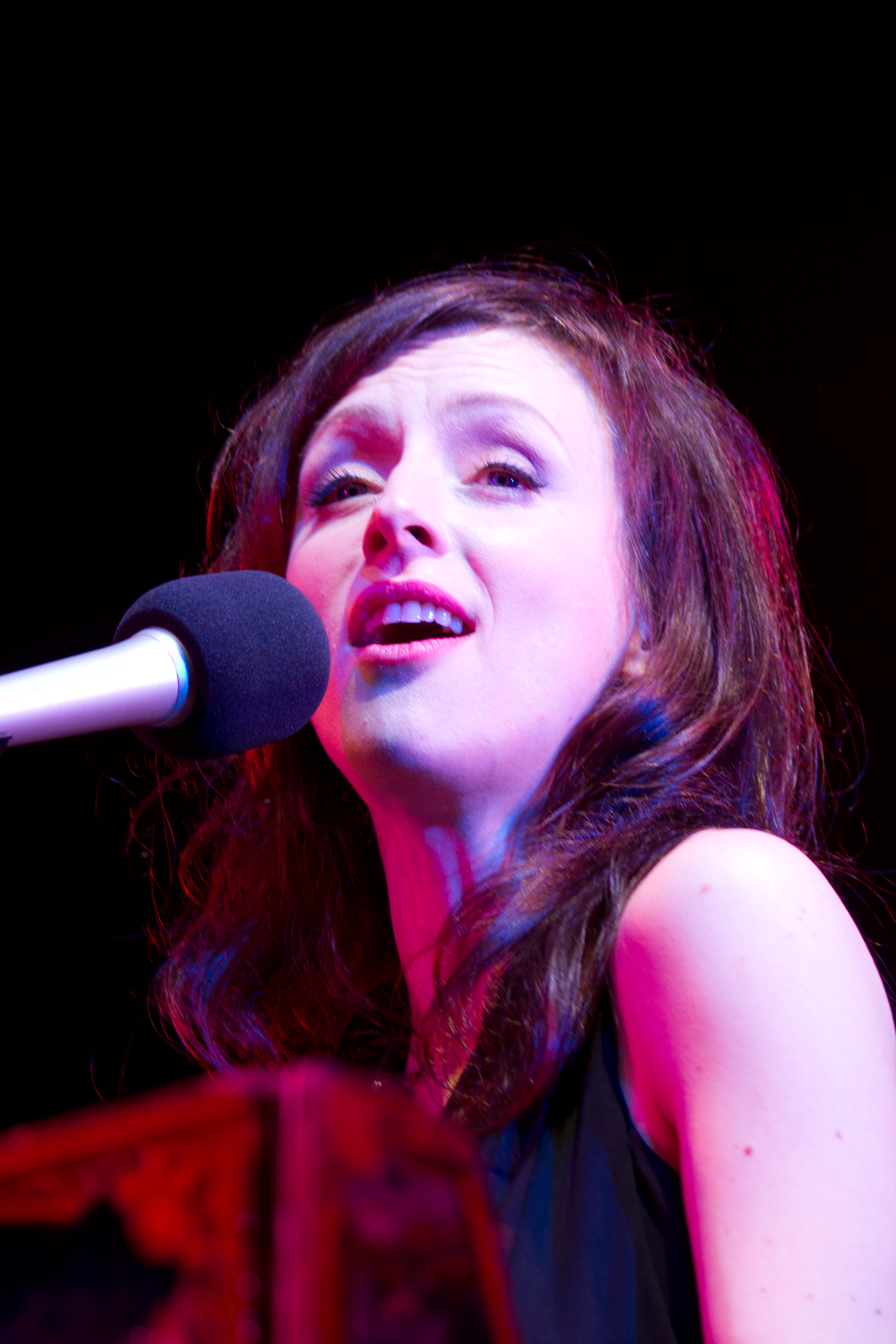
Slean performing at the 2012 Burlington's Sound of Music Festival

Slean's studio album Metaphysics was released in April 2017. A pre-order campaign for the album was held on PledgeMusic.

=== Other music work ===
In 2006, she contributed two covers ("Us and Them" and "Comfortably Numb") to Pink Floyd Redux, a modern 12-track tribute to Pink Floyd.

Another notable cover in Slean's repertoire is her down-tempo rendition of Our Lady Peace's guitar-driven song "Julia". Our Lady Peace has performed Slean's "piano" version of their song in their own concerts. Vocalist Raine Maida explained the origins of the piano version: "We’re gonna do a song from our first record now, that was given to us on a cassette tape, a very different version, from a girl named Sarah Slean from Toronto..."

Slean was also featured on the Fox TV network as the pianist in Sunrise, the fictional town where bodies started piling up in Murder in Small Town X, a short-lived reality TV series.

In October 2008, Slean performed at the first annual Canwest Cabaret Festival in Toronto. Slean performed sets of her own music accompanied by bassist Joe Phillips and drummer Mark Mariash, and also contributed to multi-artist "songbook" performances of the songs of Leonard Cohen and Kurt Weill.

In March 2009, Slean took part in the Juno Songwriter's Circle in Vancouver, alongside fellow songwriters Jim Cuddy, Jacob Hoggard (of Hedley), Doc Walker, Buffy Saint-Marie, Vancouver upstart Ndidi Onukwulu, and Hawksley Workman, who hosted. She played two songs from The Baroness, "Notes from the Underground" and "Looking for Someone".

In 2009 she took part in an interactive documentary series called City Sonic. The series, which featured 20 Toronto artists, had her talk about performing at the Rivoli while attending the University of Toronto.

On 18 April 2011, Slean chose a song called "New Pair of Eyes" from Land, to be included on the compilation album Songs of Love for Japan. She described the song as an "ode to the shocking wonder of existence". Songs of Love for Japan was available for only 3 days, with all proceeds going toward relief efforts in the aftermath of the earthquake and tsunami that struck Japan on 11 March 2011.

Since at least 2021, Slean has worked on writing the music for the stage musical Maudie, based on the life of Canadian artist Maud Lewis. As of August 2025, the musical was still in development.

In 2026, Slean won a DORA for “Outstanding New Opera” as part of the compositional team for Canuck Cantatas.

== Personal life ==
Slean was born in Pickering, Ontario. She attended Dunbarton High School in Pickering. After initially studying music at York University, she completed a degree in music and philosophy at the University of Toronto.

In 2008, Slean and fellow singer-songwriter Royal Wood got engaged while in Paris; the pair married in 2009, and would divorce in 2013. In January 2014, Slean said she and Wood had "parted ways as friends".

On November 7, 2020, Slean announced on her social media accounts that she was pregnant with a daughter. Slean gave birth to a baby girl named Abigail on March 11, 2021.

== Discography ==
=== Studio albums ===
Title	Details	Notes
Blue Parade	Released: 17 August 1998; Label: (None)	Independent release
Night Bugs	Released: 19 March 2002; Label: WEA / Atlantic Records	First major label release, Nominated for Best New Artist Juno Award
Day One	Released: 28 September 2004; Label: WEA	Nominated for Best Adult Alternative Album Juno Award
The Baroness	Released: 11 March 2008; Label: WEA	Nominated for Best Adult Alternative Album Juno Award
Black Flowers	Released: 1 June 2009; Label: PID Productions	Collaboration with the Art of Time Ensemble
Land & Sea	Released: 27 September 2011; Label: Pheromone Recordings	
Metaphysics	Released: 7 April 2017	
Sarah Slean & Symphony Nova Scotia	Released: 24 January 2020; Label: Centrediscs	Nominated for 2021 Juno Awards: Classical Album of the Year – Vocal or Choral Performance

=== EPs and live albums ===
Title	Details	Notes
Universe	Released: 1997 (Cassette); 1998 (CD); Label: (None)	Independent release
Sarah Slean EP	Released: 17 July 2001; Label: WEA / Atlantic Records	
Orphan Music	Released: 31 October 2006; Label: WEA	Live album with newly recorded studio versions, B-sides, and remixes
The Baroness Redecorates	Released: 9 December 2008; Label: WEA	B-sides EP consisting of tracks cut from The Baroness
Beauty Lives – The B-Sides	Released: December 2010; Label: WEA	Collection of newly recorded old and new tracks
String Quartet No. 2	Released: March 2011; Label: The Baroness Inc.	String quartet written as a commission for The Blue Ceiling Dance Company
These Two with Hawksley Workman	Released: 2020	

=== Singles ===
Title	Details	Notes
"Lucky Me"	Released: 6 July 2004; Label: WEA	
"When Another Midnight"	Released: 16 November 2004; Label: WEA	Features hip-hop artist K-OS
"Mary"	Released: 9 August 2005; Label: WEA	Improbable Pop Radio Mix, not the Day One version

=== Radio releases ===
- "Sweet Ones" (2002)
- "Weight" (2002)
- "Duncan" (2003)
- "Lucky Me" (2004)
- "Day One"(2005)
- "Mary" (2005)
- "Somebody's Arms" (2005)
- "Get Home" (2008)
- "Set It Free" (2011)
- "Sarah" (2017)

=== Music videos ===
- "Weight" (1998)
- "High" (2000)
- "Sweet Ones" (2002)
- "Lucky Me" (2004)
- "Day One"(2005)
- "Mary" (2005)
- "Get Home" (2008)
- "The Rose" (2010)
- "Set It Free" (2011)
- "The Devil & the Dove" (2012)
- "Society Song" (2012)
- "Sarah" (2017)
- "Every Rhythm Is The Beat" (2017)

== Bibliography ==
- Ravens (2004)

Slean's first collection of poetry, containing 21 poems in 69 pages, including original artwork.

- The Baroness (2008)

A companion poetry book to the eponymous album, containing 46 pages.

== Filmography ==
- Black Widow (2005)

In late 2004, she filmed Black Widow with Canadian director David Mortin, a film noir musical based on the Evelyn Dick murder case. It premiered in September 2005 on the film festival circuit and on CBC Television in January 2006.

- Tales of the Baroness (2007)

In 2006, Slean teamed up once again with video director Nelson Chan ("Mary", "Day One") to create a three-part short film titled Tales of the Baroness. The first segment aired on 11 May 2007 on Bravo!.

- Last Flowers (2009)

In 2009, Slean was in another short film, Last Flowers (Parts 1 and 2 on Vimeo), written and directed by CJ Wallis and produced by Elli Weisbaum.

- The Translator (2010)

Slean landed the part of the Woman in French Film in Sonya Di Rienzo's short film, The Translator. (See excerpt on YouTube)

== Awards and recognitions ==
- 2003 Juno Awards: New Artist of the Year – Nomination
- 2005 Juno Awards: Adult Alternative Album of the Year (Day One) – Nomination
- 2005 Gemini Awards: Best Performance in a Performing Arts Program or Series (2004 Governor General's Performing Arts Award) – Nomination
- 2006 Gemini Awards: Best Performance in a Performing Arts Program or Series (Black Widow) – Nomination
- 2009 Juno Awards: Adult Alternative Album of the Year (The Baroness) – Nomination
- 2011 Leo Awards: Best Music Video ("The Rose": CJ Wallis – Producer)
- 2021 Juno Awards: Best Classical Album (Vocal/Choral) -- Nomination

Two record engineers have been nominated in the Recording Engineer of the Year category at the Junos for their work with Slean: Peter Prilesnik in 2005 for Day One, and Jeff Wolpert in 2012 for Land & Sea.
