= Land & Sea (album) =

Studio album by Sarah Slean
- Released: September 27, 2011 (Canada)
- Length: 71:32
- Label: Pheromone Recordings
- Producer: Joel Plaskett (Land); Jonathan Goldsmith and Sarah Slean (Sea)

Sarah Slean chronology
The Baroness Redecorates (2008)	Land & Sea (2011)

Singles from Land & Sea
- 1. "Set It Free" Released: May 2, 2011; 2. "The Devil & The Dove" Released: June 24, 2012; 3. "Society Song" Released: August 16, 2012

Land & Sea is the fifth studio album by Canadian singer-songwriter and pianist Sarah Slean, released on September 27, 2011. It is a double album consisting of the more pop-oriented tunes of Land, and the mellow and orchestral songs of Sea.

The album debuted at No. 48 in Canada.

== Track listing ==
=== Land ===
All tracks are written by Sarah Slean.

No.	Title	Length
1.	"Life"	4:03
2.	"The Day We Saved The World"	3:48
3.	"Set It Free"	2:45
4.	"Everybody's On TV"	2:58
5.	"Amen"	4:03
6.	"I Am A Light"	3:20
7.	"New Pair of Eyes"	3:55
8.	"Girls Hating Girls"	4:10
9.	"Society Song"	3:13
Total length:		32:17

- All songs produced by Joel Plaskett, except "Everybody's On TV" by Royal Wood and Sarah Slean, and "Set It Free" by Greg Johnston.

=== Sea ===
All tracks are written by Sarah Slean.

No.	Title	Length
1.	"Cosmic Ballet"	6:02
2.	"Everything by the Gallon"	4:20
3.	"The Devil & The Dove"	4:06
4.	"Napoleon"	4:20
5.	"Attention Archers"	3:21
6.	"You're Not Alone"	5:00
7.	"The One True Love"	4:53
8.	"The Right Words"	3:33
9.	"My Eyes & Your Eyes"	3:38
Total length:		39:15

- All songs produced by Jonathan Goldsmith and Sarah Slean, except "Attention Archers" and "My Eyes & Your Eyes" by Sarah Slean.
- Strings arrangements on "Napoleon", "The Right Words", "The One True Love" and "Cosmic Ballet" by Sarah Slean; on "You're Not Alone", "Everything by the Gallon" and "The Devil & The Dove" by Jonathan Goldsmith.

== Singles ==
- "Set It Free" (May 2, 2011). A music video was also produced.
