= I Sayd I Look Away! =

Studio album by Perseo Miranda
- Released: 1981
- Genre: Punk; heavy metal
- Label: Lodger

Perseo Miranda chronology
Perseo Miranda and His Theatre (1980)	I Sayd I Look Away! (1981)	Light and Darkness (2006)

I Sayd I Look Away! is a single CD by the Italian singer-songwriter Perseo Miranda. It contains one track and was released in 1981 by Lodger Records.

== Track listing ==
1. "I sayd I look Away!"
