= Parallelism =

Parallelism may refer to:

- Angle of parallelism, in hyperbolic geometry, the angle at one vertex of a right hyperbolic triangle that has two hyperparallel sides
- Axial parallelism, a type of motion characteristic of a gyroscope and astronomical bodies
- Conscious parallelism or also tacit parallelism, price-fixing between competitors that occurs without any communication between the parties
- Parallel computing, the simultaneous execution on multiple processors of different parts of a program
  - In the analysis of parallel algorithms, the maximum possible speedup of a computation
- Parallel evolution, the independent emergence of a similar trait in different unrelated species
- Parallel (geometry), the property of parallel lines
- Parallelism (grammar), a balance of two or more similar words, phrases, or clauses
- Parallelism (rhetoric), the use of similar ideas or phrases for rhetorical effect
- Psychophysical parallelism, the theory that the conscious and nervous processes vary concomitantly
- Parallel harmony/doubling, or harmonic parallelism, in music

== See also ==
- Parallel (disambiguation)
