= Sawthis =

Italian thrash metal band

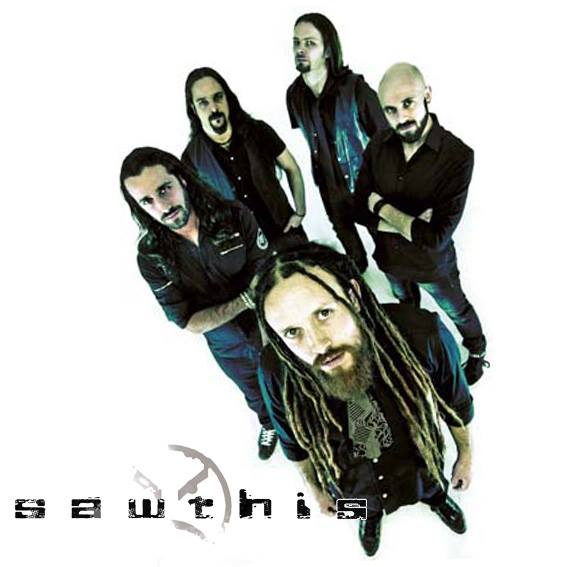

Background information
- Origin: Teramo, Italy
- Genres: Thrash metal; groove metal; death metal (early)
- Years active: 2000–present
- Labels: Mighty Music, Bakerteam, Scarlet, Temple of Noise
- Members: Alessandro Falà; Michele Melchiorre; Adriano Quaranta; Marco Di Carlo; Gaetano Ettorre
- Website: sawthis.it

Sawthis is an Italian thrash metal band formed in 2000.

== History ==
The band formed under the original name of Sothis in 2000, however, the band was forced to change their name in 2009 to Sawthis as a result of legal action from USA's black metal band Sothis. The band issued a statement regarding the name change early in 2009: "After 12 years, we have been forced to change our moniker because of a homonym with an American black metal band that has obtained the exclusive rights, although they started using the moniker later. It has been hard to accept, but we could do nothing". They recorded two demos before signing a record deal with Temple of Noise Records and releasing their first full-length album Fusion in 2006, which was accompanied by a video for the song "Beyond the Bound".

After singer Franco Topitti split with the band, a new vocalist, Alessandro Falà, joined Sawthis. In 2010, their second album, Egod, was released under Scarlet Records. After the release, Sawthis supported Vader during the Blitzkrieg European Tour.

During 2011, Sawthis released a second video, "Act of Sorrow". In March 2012, they supported Sepultura on the Kairos European tour and in August they played at the Spirit of Burgas Festival with Korn.

During 2013, Sawthis signed a record deal with Bakerteam Records for the release of their third studio album titled Youniverse. Youniverse was written as a concept album based on dissociative identity disorder. Each song on the album represents a different mentally-ill personality. Youniverse featured Rob Cavestany from Death Angel on the track "The Disturbed". "The Waking Up" was the first single released from the album, followed by "Logical Colors" and "The Crowded Room". After the release of Youniverse, the band started a European Tour supporting a few shows with Children of Bodom.

In April 2014, the video for the single, "The Crowded Room", was released and the band announced a new European Tour supporting Deicide scheduled for December 2014.

In 2017, Sawthis signed a deal with Mighty Music for the worldwide release of their fourth album BABHELL. The videoclip of the first single is "This String Is For Your Neck". After the release of the album, a 360° videoclip for the single "Start A New Game" was released.

== Band members ==
Current

- Alessandro Falà – vocals (2009–present)
- Marco Di Carlo – lead guitar (2011–present)
- Adriano Quaranta – rhythm guitar (2000–2013, 2015–present)
- Gaetano Ettorre – bass (2005–present)
- Michele Melchiorre – drums (2000–present)

Former

- Franco Topitti – vocals (2000–2009)
- Devis Ercole – rhythm guitar (2006–2011)
- Franco Topitti – rhythm guitar (2000–2006)
- Janos Murri – lead guitar (2013–2015)
- Danilo Cantarino – bass (2003–2005)
- Fabrizio Carota – bass (2000–2003)

== Discography ==
=== Studio albums ===
- Fusion (2006)
- Egod (2010)
- Youniverse (2013)
- Babhell (2017)

=== Demos ===
- The Seven Lies (2001)
- Instinct (2003)

== Videos ==
- "Beyond the Bound". YouTube.
- "Act of Sorrow". YouTube.
- "The Waking Up". YouTube.
- "Logical Colors". YouTube.
- "The Crowded Room". YouTube.
- "Thi string Is For Your Neck". YouTube.
- "Start A New Game". YouTube.
