= Night Bugs =

Studio album by Sarah Slean
- Released: 2002
- Recorded: Bearsville Studios, N.Y.
- Genre: Adult alternative
- Label: Warner Canada
- Producer: Hawksley Workman and Sarah Slean

Sarah Slean chronology
Sarah Slean EP (2001)	Night Bugs (2002)	Day One (2004)

Professional ratings
Review scores
Source	Rating
Allmusic	link

Night Bugs is the second album by Canadian artist Sarah Slean.

== Track listing ==
1. "Eliot" - 4:22
2. "Weight" - 3:16
3. "Duncan" - 4:08
4. "St. Francis" - 4:12
5. "Drastic Measures" - 5:42
6. "Book Smart, Street Stupid" - 4:49
7. "Dark Room" - 2:27
8. "Sweet Ones" - 3:13
9. "Me, I'm A Thief" - 6:09
10. "My Invitation" - 3:34
11. "Bank Accounts" - 3:04
- All songs by Sarah Slean
- All strings arranged and conducted by Sarah Slean
- All horns arranged and conducted by Sarah Slean, except mid-song trumpet solo in "Bank Accounts" by Sarah McElcheran

== Personnel ==
- Piano, vocals - Sarah Slean
- Trumpet - Jim Hynes, Jeff Kievit
- French Horn - Chris Korner
- Trombone - Michael Davis
- Violin - Peter Seminov, Eric Leong
- Cello - Judith McIntyre, Dana Leong
- Viola (on "Eliot" and "Dark Room") - Valentina Charlap-Evans
