= The Baroness Redecorates =

EP by Sarah Slean
- Released: December 9, 2008
- Genre: Piano pop
- Length: 29:15
- Label: Warner Music

Sarah Slean chronology
The Baroness (2008)	The Baroness Redecorates (2008)	Land & Sea (2011)

Professional ratings
Review scores
Source	Rating
CHARTattack	2.5/5 stars

The Baroness Redecorates is the second EP by Canadian singer-songwriter and pianist Sarah Slean, released on December 9, 2008. Slean confirmed the EP and two of its tracks on her official website in her journal during Question and Answer periods. The rest of the track listing was confirmed on her website in November.

== Track listing ==
1. Parasol
2. Lonely Side of the Moon
3. Modern Man I & II
4. Compatriots
5. The Rose
6. Hear Me Out
7. The "Disarm" Suite
