= A Silence That Screams =

Studio album by Perseo Miranda
- Released: 15 December 2010
- Recorded: October 2010 – November 2010, at "Quake Sound" Studios, Genoa, Italy
- Genre: Progressive metal; hard rock
- Length: 55:05
- Label: Erga Edizioni
- Producer: Pier Gonella

Perseo Miranda chronology
Praise My Day (2009)	A Silence That Screams (2010)

A Silence That Screams is the eight album of the Italian heavy metal band Perseo Miranda, released on 15 December 2010 under the label Erga Edizioni. The track "In a broken dream" is a cover of Phyton Lee Jackson.

== History ==
The album was recorded in October and November 2010 at Quake Sound. (Genoa, Italy), but the composition began in April 2010. The cover and all booklet was made by Matteo Merli for Erga Edizioni.

== Track listing ==
No.	Title	Writer(s)	Length
1.	"Brick of Time"	Perseo Miranda	0:26
2.	"Brick of time (choice of time)"	Miranda	0:19
3.	"A silence that screams"	Miranda	5:51
4.	"Change the meaning"	Miranda	4:08
5.	"The run and the sound"	Miranda	4:26
6.	"In a broken dream"	Miranda	5:06
7.	"What is this"	Miranda	4:09
8.	"His bad room"	Miranda	5:25
9.	"Another sky"	Miranda	0:35
10.	"A silence that screams pt2"	Miranda	1:03

== Personnel ==
- Perseo Miranda – voice
- Pier Gonella – guitars-bass
- Pino Di Stadio – drums
