= Universo (disambiguation) =

Universo is the name of a comic book character

Universo may also refer to:

- Universo BRB
- Universo Online
- El Universo, newspaper
- "Universo" (song), a 2020 song by Blas Cantó
- Universo (TV network), an American cable network
- Universo, a 2008 album by Axel
- Universo (Mara Sattei album), 2022

== See also ==
- Universo Latino
- Universe (disambiguation)
