= Blue Parade =

Studio album by Sarah Slean
- Released: August 1999
- Genre: Rock
- Length: 62:57
- Label: Independent
- Producer: Sarah Slean

Sarah Slean chronology
| Universe (1997) | Blue Parade (1999) | Sarah Slean (2001) |

Professional ratings
Review scores
| Source | Rating |
|---|---|
| Allmusic | link |

Blue Parade is the first full-length album by Canadian artist Sarah Slean.

== Track listing ==
1. "Playing Cards with Judas"
2. "Bonnie's Song"
3. "My Invitation"
4. "Before Your Time"
5. "Habit"
6. "Twin Moon"
7. "Awake Soon"
8. "High"
9. "Eliot"
10. "Blue Parade"
11. "Narcolepsy Weed"
12. "I Want to be Brave (Madeleine)" (hidden track)

== Personnel ==
- All songs by Sarah Slean
- Sarah Slean - vocals, piano, wurlitzer, toy piano, rhodes
- Mark Mariash - drums, djembe, maracas, crazy moog on "Habit", glockenspiel on "Eliot", finger cymbals
- Drew Birston - bass, except for tracks 6 and 9
- Maury Lafoy - bass on track 6 and 9
- Kurt Swinghammer - guitars, electric sitar, moog bass on "High", feedback, e-bow, lap steel, loveton
- Kevin Fox - cello except track 11
- Todd Lumley - Hammond B3, accordion
- Erin Donovan - vibraphone on track 2
- Hayden - guest appearing on "Madeleine"
