= Perseo Miranda and His Theatre =

Perseo Miranda and his Theatre

Studio album by Perseo Miranda
- Released: 1980
- Genre: Punk, heavy metal
- Label: Lodger Records

Perseo Miranda chronology
Perseo Miranda and his Theatre (1980)	I Sayd I Look Away! (1981)

Perseo Miranda and His Theatre is the first album released by Italian singer and songwriter, Perseo Miranda. The album contains seven tracks and was released in 1980 by Lodger Records. Six tracks are in Italian; just one track is in English.

== Track listing ==
1. Obitorio
2. Let's beat the power
3. Lamenti al nulla
4. Sotto il filo spinato
5. Segmento a
6. E' fuggito sulle feci
7. Il cerchio
