= Separate reality =

Separate reality and similar can mean:

- Separate Reality (climbing route) in Yosemite National Park, California
- A Separate Reality, a 1971 book by Carlos Castaneda

== See also ==
- Parallel universe (disambiguation)
