= Universum (building) =

Coordinates: 63°49′11″N 20°18′20″E

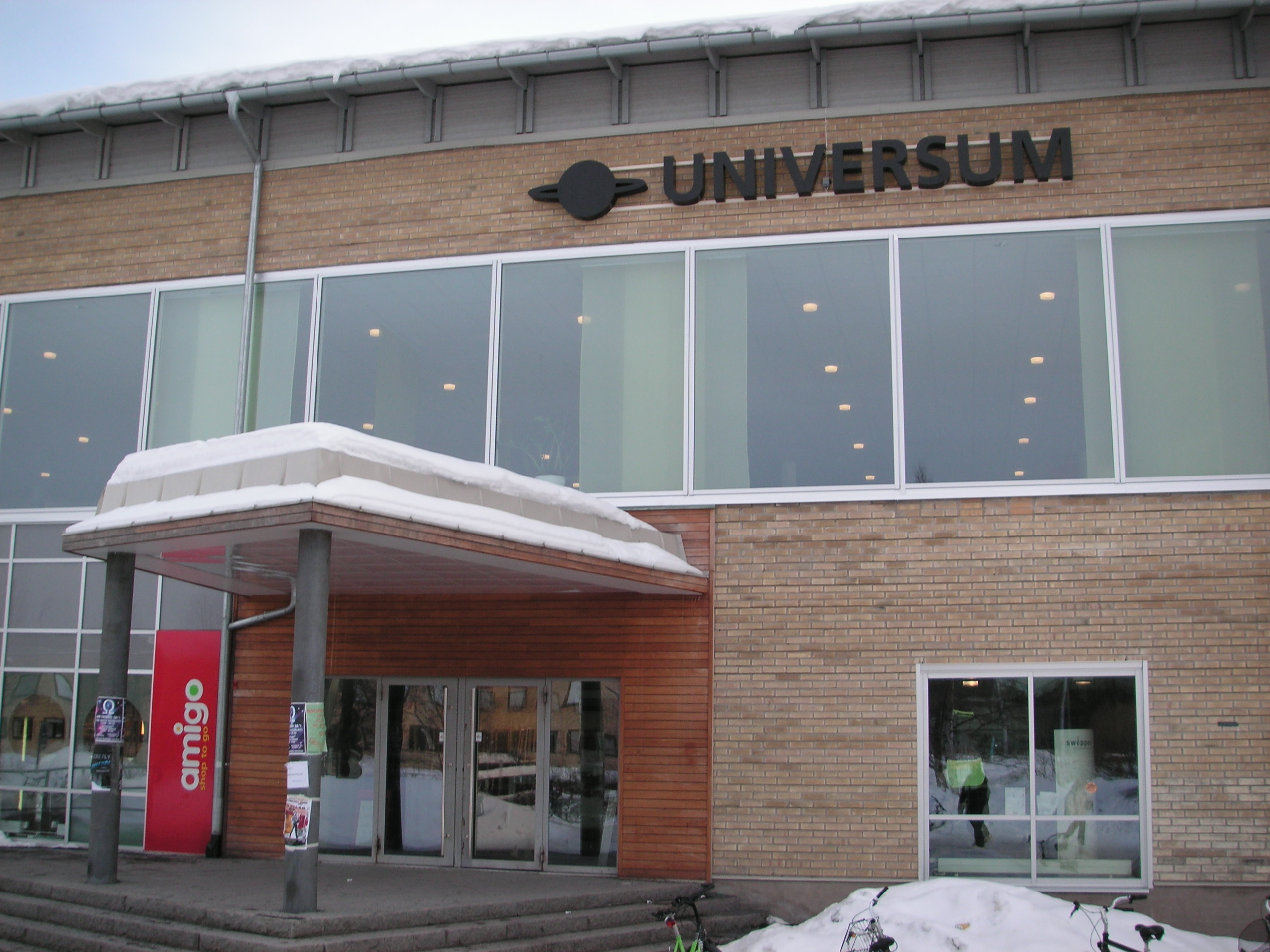
The entrance to Universum

Universum is a building at the campus of Umeå University, in Umeå, Sweden, which contains the auditorium Aula Nordica, the offices of the student unions, a dining hall, a cafeteria and group study rooms. The building is owned by the government-owned property company Akademiska Hus.

The first phase of the construction was completed in 1970. The auditorium extension was drafted by Arkinova Architects and was constructed in 1996-97. In September, 2006, Universum was reinaugurated after a major renovation.
