= Parallel Dimensions (album) =

Studio album by Perseo Miranda
- Released: December 5, 2008
- Genre: Progressive metal; heavy metal
- Label: Erga Edizioni,

Perseo Miranda chronology
Evolution Of The Spirit (2007)	Parallel Dimensions (2008)	Praise My Day (2009)

Parallel Dimensions is Perseo Miranda's fourth album, released on December 5, 2008, on Erga Edizioni. The album was recorded at Music Art Studios (Italy) in August 2008.

It received good reviews: Italian webzine OndaAlternativa noted some changes in the style, moving from gothic metal to a kind of "trash-prog metal".Powermetal.it described this work as hard rock music with modern ideas, especially in the guitar work.

== Track listing ==
1. Parallel Dimensions
2. The Mountain
