= Universe (ShuuKaRen song) =

- CD, DVD, and digital EP cover

Single by ShuuKaRen
- B-side: "Tricky"; "Take-a-Shot"
- Released: October 5, 2016
- Recorded: 2016
- Genre: Dance
- Length: 4:17
- Label: Sony Music Entertainment Japan
- Songwriters: Sakura; Kubo-C; GS; P-Cho; Sway
- Producer: Chaki Zulu

"Universe" (stylized as "UNIVERSE") is a song recorded by Japanese duo ShuuKaRen, composed of sisters Shuuka and Karen Fujii. It was released by Sony Music Entertainment Japan on October 5, 2016, as their debut release together. The single was distributed in three physical formats—a standard CD, a CD and DVD bundle, and a magazine-styled package with two discs—and for digital consumption. Additionally, each addition apart from the one-track format came with the two B-sides: "Tricky" and "Take-a-Shot", whilst a digital EP consisted the instrumental versions.

The recording was written by Sakura, Kubo-C, GS, P-Cho and Sway, whilst production and composing was handled solely by Chaki Zulu. It is their first single to be conceived through the concept of "two vocal divas". Additionally, it is the first time Shuuka provides vocals to a musical project, and is the first musician from parent group E-girls to do so. Sonically, "Universe" is an electronic dance tune that incorporates instrumentation of synthesizers, vocoder, and keyboards through its composition.

Upon its release, "Universe" received mixed reviews from music critics. Several reviews noted Shuuka's debut as a vocalist, with commentators commending the commercial appeal. However, critics were ambivalent towards its Western sound and production. Commercially, the single experienced success in Japan, peaking inside the top 10 on both the Oricon Singles Chart and Japan Hot 100. An accompanying music video was directed by Shigeaki Kubo, depicting the girls in several club-oriented locations. To promote the single, ShuuKaRen performed "Universe" on several television shows and subsequently used it in Japanese commercials.

== Background and composition ==
In August 2016, E-Girls members and sisters Shuuka and Karen Fujii announced their formation of a sub-unit to the group, named ShuuKaRen, whilst carrying on activities with their corresponding sub-groups Flower (Shuuka) and Happiness (Karen). The announcement was confirmed during an E-Girls concert in Japan. The duo revealed plans for a new single titled "Universe". Though it was the sisters' first musical release, they did work together prior to the formation with a fashion book, titled Antithese, which garnered critical success and sold over 100,000 units in Japan. Along with this, ShuuKaRen confirmed the inclusion of two B-side tracks: "Tricky" and "Take-a-Shot", the latter featuring vocals and composition by Japanese unit PKCZ®. According to their website, it is their first single to have been conceived through the concept of "two vocal divas" that create music "based on black [culture]".

"Universe" was written by Sakura, Kubo-C, GS, P-Cho and Sway, whilst production and additional composing was handled by Chaki Zulu. It marks the first time Shuuka has provided lead vocals to a musical project, and is the first performer from E-girls and Flower to become a singer. Musically, "Universe" is an "aggressive sounding" dance tune that was noted as an "edgier" departure from their work with E-Girls, Happiness and Flower. According to a staff member at Selective Hearing, he/she recognized the sound as a "crossover" between the work of E-Girls and Japanese singer Namie Amuro. An editor at Asian Junkie, however, noted its appeal as a "safe EDM track". Throughout the track, both Shuuka and Karen's vocals are processed with vocoder and autotune, and performed it with "high-pitched" singing and an additional rap section before the first chorus.

== Release ==
The song "Universe" was released on September 9, 2016, via iTunes Store Japan, along with its music video that premiered on various Japanese music television networks. On September 15, Sony Music Entertainment Japan had released details regarding the singles formats and pre-ordered versions at the Sony Music Shop came with a large-size poster of both Shuuka and Karen. Seven days later, the B-side track "Take-a-Shot" featuring PKCZ® was released on iTunes Store. Subsequently, "Universe" was released on October 5, 2016, by Sony Music Japan, and was distributed in three physical formats—a limited CD, CD and DVD bundle, and magazine issue—and for digital consumption. All three formats came with the three tracks, whilst the latter two featured the music video to "Universe". Additionally, the latter version came with a 52-page magazine that encased both the CD and DVD, and included a bonus post card and poster. House in a card sleeve case, the cover art was published online in late September, featuring a close-up of both Shuuka and Karen. The instrumental versions of each track were inserted on the digital EP, distributed via iTunes Store.

== Reception ==
Although "Universe" attracted mixed reviews from music critics, reviews praised Shuuka's debut as a vocalists. Staff members at KKBox had labelled all three recordings as "hot" featured tracks. M-On! Entertainment complimented the girls deliveries, labelling it "fresh". Additionally, the reviewer believed it to be one of the top "club songs of 2016". A positive remark came from the publication Selective Hearing, who appreciated the tracks commercial appeal towards "cool" and "urban" youth. Despite the review noting its somewhat "understandable" delivery and mixture of genres, it concluded "Overall it’s a fairly solid debut single for the Fujii sisters." Similarly, a member at CD Journal commended the tracks use of a more "mature EDM" style, and highlighted both the singers vocals. Conversely, a member at Asian Junkie gave it a mixed review but dismissed the girls vocals. Although the reviewer felt the sound and production was "simple" and predictable, he/she enjoyed the overall delivery and found it "pleasant and upbeat enough to hold your attention."

Commercially, "Universe" experienced success in Japan. It debuted at number six on the daily Oricon Singles Chart, and peaked at number two on October 10, 2016. Based on a six-day statistic, the single opened at number four on the weekly chart with 55,482 units sold. The following week—dated October 24—saw a slump in sales, slipping to number 19 with sales of 4,498 copies. The release had its final appearance inside the top 40 at number 37, and spent an overall duration of seven weeks in the top 200 chart. Oricon ranked "Universe" as the tenth highest-selling single of October, with sales of 62,730; this marked ShuuKaRen the best-selling girl group of October 2016 on the Oricon Singles Chart. Likewise, it peaked at number six on the Japan Hot 100, and was also listed at number 23 and on the Radio Songs and number 4 on the Top Sales Singles Chart.

== Music video and promotion ==
An accompanying music video was directed by Shigeaki Kubo, whom wanted to emphasise the concept of "breaking free from the monotony of everyday life" within the visual. It was released via Sony's official YouTube channel on September 9, 2016. It opens with a small introduction of ShuuKaRen, and starts with them singing in a small multi-colored studio; Shuuka is in a caravan, whilst Karen is singing in a bath rub and scenes behind a camera. It follows with them walking on a red carpet, with Shuuka wearing a blue dress and Karen in pink. From there onwards, it has the girls perform the track in three additional club-oriented locations; in front of a colored plaid background, in a black and white room, and in a club surrounded by LED lights.

In order to promote the single, ShuuKaRen took part in the Low and High live concert tour in Japan, which also featured E-Girls. The recording, alongside "Tricky" were advertised in Japanese commercials; "Universe" was used for the "Show Me Color" campaign of Beats by Dre whilst "Tricky" was commercialized for the E-Ma throat lozenges. "Take-a-Shot" was performed at the opening for the men's professional basketball B.League for its 2016–17 season, dated September 22.

== Track listing and formats ==
Regular CD / digital download
No.	Title	Writer(s)	Length
1.	"Universe"	Sakura; Kubo-C; GS; P-Cho; Sway	4:17
2.	"Tricky"		3:35
3.	"Take-a-Shot" (PZCK)		3:35

Limited CD
No.	Title	Writer(s)	Length
1.	"Universe"	Sakura; Kubo-C; GS; P-Cho; Sway	4:17

Special EP bonus tracks
No.	Title	Writer(s)	Length
1.	"Universe" (Instrumental)	Sakura; Kubo-C; GS; P-Cho; Sway	4:17
2.	"Tricky" (Instrumental)		3:35
3.	"Take-a-Shot" (featuring PZCK; Instrumental)		3:35

DVD
No.	Title	Director	Length
1.	"Universe" (Music video)	Shigeaki Kubo	3:37

== Credits and personnel ==
Credits adapted from the liner notes of the single's CD.

- Karen Fujii – vocals
- Shuuka Fujii – vocals
- Sakura – composing, production
- Kubo-C – composing, production
- GS – composing, production
- P-Cho – composing, production
- Sway – composing, production
- Chaki Zuli – songwriting
- Kubo Shigeaki – visual director
- Sony Music Japan – record label

== Charts ==
=== Oricon charts ===
Chart (2016)	Peak position
Japan Daily Chart (Oricon)	2
Japan Weekly Chart (Oricon)	4

=== Billboard charts ===
Chart (2016)	Peak position
Japan Hot 100 (Billboard)	6
Japan Radio Songs (Billboard)	23
Japan Top Singles Sales (Billboard)	4

== Sales ==
Region	Certification	Certified units/sales
Japan	—	59,980
