= Parallel World =

Parallel World or Parallel Worlds may refer to:

- Parallel World (1983 video game), a video game published by Enix for home computers
- Parallel World (1990 video game), a video game published by Varie for the Family Computer
- Parallel World (Cadence Weapon album), a 2021 album by Cadence Weapon
- Parallel Worlds (album), a 1993 album by Dave Douglas
- Parallel Worlds (book), a 2004 popular science book by Michio Kaku
- "Parallel Worlds" (song), a 2007 song by Elliot Minor

== See also ==
- Parallel universe (disambiguation)
- Parallel worlds chess
- Parallel Worlds, Parallel Lives
