= Parallel lines (disambiguation) =

Parallel lines are two lines in a shared plane that do not intersect.

Parallel Lines or Parallel Line may also refer to:

- Parallel Lines, a 1978 album by Blondie
- Parallel Lines (Dick Gaughan & Andy Irvine album), a 1982 album by Dick Gaughan and Andy Irvine
- Driver: Parallel Lines, a 2006 video game
- "Parallel Lines", a 1988 song by Little River Band from the album Monsoon
- Parallel Line (Sayuri song)
- Parallel Line (Keith Urban song)
- "Parallel Lines", a 2001 song by Kings of Convenience from Quiet Is the New Loud
