= ARTV (disambiguation) =

ARTV may refer to:

- ART Television (Sri Lanka), a Sri Lankan English-language television channel
- ARTV (Portuguese TV channel) or Canal Parlamento, a Portuguese legislature television station
- Ici ARTV, a Canadian television channel devoted to the arts
