= Universe (yacht) =

History

Cayman Islands
- Name: Universe
- Builder: Amels Holland B.V.
- Yard number: 7403
- Launched: 2018
- In service: 2018
- Identification: IMO number: 9777591; MMSI number: 319129400; Callsign: ZGHF9

General characteristics
- Class & type: Motor yacht
- Tonnage: 1,790 GT
- Displacement: 1725 full load
- Length: 74 m (243 ft)
- Beam: 12.45 m (40.8 ft)
- Draught: 3.85 m (12.6 ft)
- Speed: 15 knots (28 km/h) (cruise); 16.5 knots (31 km/h) (max)
- Capacity: 12 guests
- Crew: 19

The 74 m (243 ft) superyacht Universe was launched by Amels Holland B.V. at its yard in Vlissingen. She was designed by Tim Heywood, and the interior design was created by Winch Design. She is one of an eight Amels 242 Limited Edition serie built between 2016 and 2024.

== Design ==
Her length is 74 m (243 ft), beam is 12.45 m (40.8 ft) and she has a draught of 3.85 m (12.6 ft). The hull is built out of steel while the superstructure is made out of aluminium with teak laid decks. The yacht is classed by Lloyd's Register and registered in the Cayman Islands.

=== Performance ===
With her 155,000 L (41,000 US gal) fuel tanks she has a maximum range of 5,000 nmi (9,300 km) at 12.50 knots (23 km/h).

== See also ==
- List of motor yachts by length
- List of yachts built by Amels BV
