= Armeerundschau =

November 1989 volume

From 1956 to 1990, Armeerundschau or “AR” (English: Army Panorama) was a monthly soldier’s magazine for members of the East German National People’s Army (German: Nationale Volksarmee or NVA). The magazine was published by the NVA’s Deutschen Militärverlag which later became the Militärverlag der DDR. The magazine was headquartered in East Berlin.

== Readership ==
The magazine had an initial print run in 1956 of 11,000 copies and by the 1980s it had 340,000 copies published monthly. Only 5-6% of the readership were military personnel.

== Background ==
The Armeerundschau was popular among soldiers, despite the relatively high price of one Mark. This popularity was primarily because of the clothed pin-ups of women in each issue. The magazine was renamed in 1990, after the fall of the Berlin Wall, with the subtitle "The International Military Magazine". The last issue appeared in July 1990, just three months before the reunification of Germany on 3 October. Up to 1962 it was in European size A4, after 1962 in A5 size. Colonel Karl-Heinz Freitag was the longest serving chief editor of Armeerundschau until he was replaced by Lieutenant Colonel Harald Mühle in early 1990.

== Purpose ==
Armeerundschau sought to represent the Army in an everyday, entertaining way, and was aimed at young people and women soldiers. It was the magazine equivalent of the more politically oriented military weekly newspaper Volksarmee (English: People’s Army) published by the Ministry of National Defense.

In his book, Fallen Elites; The Military Other in Post-Unification Germany, Andrew Bickford indicates that the purpose of Armeerundschau was to promote the virtue and glory of the military, the ruling political regime and the nation as a whole. It also was designed to idealize the view of socialist military families and relationships linking the defense of the state to the defense of these families. Bickford’s quote from the chief editor of the magazine, Karl-Heinz Freitag, sums up this purpose:

“Yes, AR was a military magazine, with a lot of coverage of military technology, history, and what not. But the real purpose of the magazine, from my point of view – and I was the chief editor for a very long time – was to prepare boys and men for their military service in the NVA, and to prepare women and girls to be good wives and girlfriends, to teach them to love soldiers and be willing to wait for them. We knew we had to convince women to love soldiers. If we didn’t, men wouldn’t want to go into the NVA.”
