= Multiverse Foundation =

Non-profit organization

Multiverse Software Foundation
- Founded: November 2011
- Founder: Tristan Bacon, Shane Fischer
- Type: Non-Profit Software
- Purpose: Online Games, Game Development
- Origins: Multiverse Network
- Volunteers: c. 200
- Website: http://www.multiversemmo.com (archived)

The Multiverse Software Foundation is a non-profit organization that was formed by volunteers in November 2011 to take over and manage the assets of the now-defunct Multiverse Network. The Foundation maintains the Multiverse MMO Development Platform, which is a collection of open-source software used to create online games. The platform and assets are made available under the MIT License.

== Mission statement ==
The Mission of The Multiverse Software Foundation is to shepherd the open source Multiverse Virtual World and MMOG Platform.

This includes the technology behind the system, as well as the community of users and developers. We aim to advance the knowledge, usage, and availability of free open source software and tools.

We do not limit how the Multiverse platform can be used. We encourage casual usage as well as usage by for-profit businesses. The Multiverse Software Foundation functions as a non profit entity. We believe this is the best way to advance the future of virtual worlds and MMOG platforms.

== Software Releases ==
Since acquiring the software and media assets of the Multiverse Network, the Multiverse Software Foundation has released new versions of the client, tools, and server packages.

== Technology ==
Multiverse client technology is based on the Axiom 3D Rendering Engine which is a C# based fork of the OGRE rendering engine. The client can be scripted and customized in Python. The server technology is based on Java and may be customized and modified in either Java or Python. The database uses MySQL and JDBC. Assets in COLLADA and OGRE format may be imported.

== Original Multiverse Network ==
The original Multiverse Network was shut down following an inability to achieve a profitable business model. Several online and promotional games were planned or in development by Multiverse including games based on Firefly, Buffy the Vampire Slayer and James Cameron's Avatar. There were also independent developers using the original Multiverse engine.
