= Day One (Sarah Slean album) =

Studio album by Sarah Slean
- Released: September 28, 2004
- Genre: Rock
- Label: WEA International
- Producers: Peter Prilesnik, Dan Kurtz and Sarah Slean

Sarah Slean chronology
Night Bugs (2002)	Day One (2004)	Orphan Music (2006)

Day One is the third album by Sarah Slean, released in 2004.

== Track listing ==
1. "Pilgrim"
2. "Lucky Me"
3. "Mary"
4. "California"
5. "Day One"
6. "Out in the Park"
7. "Vertigo"
8. "When Another Midnight"
9. "The Score"
10. "Your Wish is My Wish"
11. "Wake Up"
12. "Somebody's Arms" (hidden track)

== Notes ==
- All songs by Sarah Slean
- Published by Sarah Slean (SOCAN) © 2004
- Produced by Peter Prilesnik, Dan Kurtz, Sarah Slean
- Ian D'Sa appears courtesy of Atlantic/Warner
- Howie Beck appears courtesy of True North Records
- Engineered by Peter Prilesnik
- Additional Engineering by Eric Ratz (assisted by Walid Farah) and Kenny Luong at Vespa Music Studios.
- Chris Shreenan - Dyck at The Woodshed and John Nazario at Orange Studios
- Editing by Kenny Luong and Peter Prilesnik
- Mixed by Eric Ratz
- Mastered by Greg Calbi at Sterling Sound, NYC

== Personnel ==
- Sarah Slean—piano, vocals, string arrangement/programming, wurlitzer, keyboards, strings, trumpet programming, glockenspiel, orchestral programming, acoustic guitar, timpani, synth bass
- Dan Kurtz—bass, keyboards, guitar, programming
- Gavin Brown—drums
- Kurt Swinghammer—electric guitar, guitar, acoustic guitar
- Peter Prilesnik—acoustic guitar, drum programming, bass, guitar
- Alex Grant—cello
- Karen Graves—violin
- Ian D'sa—guitar
- Rocky Singh—drums
- Paul Brennan—drums
- Andrew Aldridge—guitar
- Stefan Szczesniak—drums
- Howie Beck—backing vocals

== Music video ==
"Day One" was Sarah Slean's second single released from this album. The music video for the single was directed by Nelson Chan, from the production company flyingmonkeycreations.

== Video Links ==
- Warner Music Canada
- FlyingMonkeyCreations
