= Mirror universe =

Cosmological theory

In physical cosmology, the mirror universe theory proposes that there exists a symmetric universe/anti-universe pair. The anti-universe obeys the same laws of physics as the universe, except that time flows backwards, its spatial coordinates are inverse, and (in most models) the charges of its particles are the opposite of the universe. Due to quantum effects, such a mirror universe would not actually be identical to the universe. The utility of the model is that it would provide an explanation for baryon asymmetry and the problem of dark energy. While various symmetries have been proven experimentally, the mirror universe remains strictly theoretical.

== Mirror universe ==
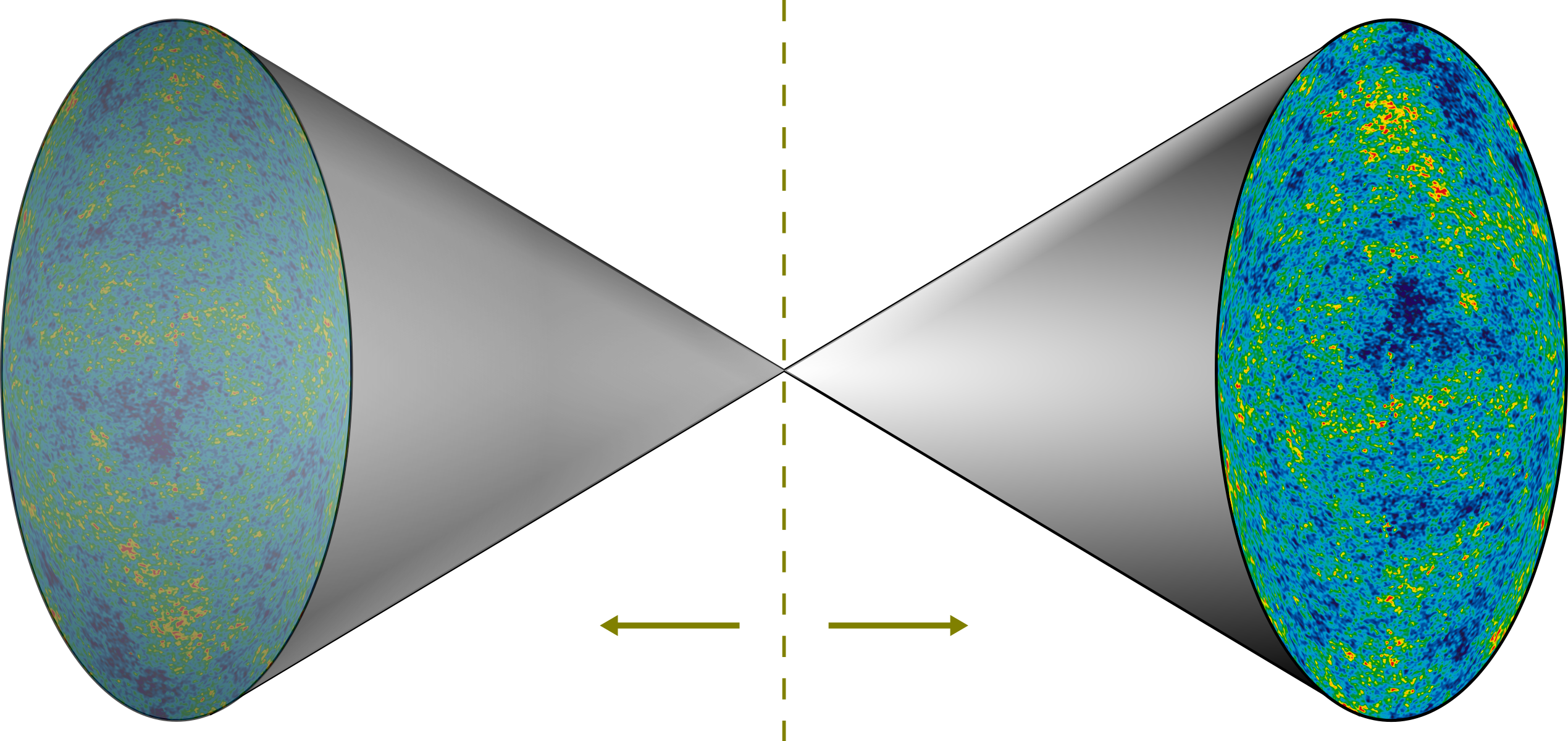
In the mirror anti-universe theory, the Big Bang generated a universe–antiuniverse pair. This universe flows forward in time, while the mirror counterpart flows backward.

Three physical symmetries play a role in mirror universe theories: transformations of charge conjugation (C), parity transformation (P), and time reversal (T). If C, P, and T are all symmetrically inversed, that is CPT symmetry. In a CPT symmetric universe theory, the universe does not violate the CPT symmetry, because the Big Bang would be a double sided event, both classically and quantum mechanically, consisting of a universe/anti-universe pair. That means that the universe is the charge (C), parity (P) and time (T) image of an anti-universe.

The implication of CPT symmetry is that a "mirror-image" of the universe—with all objects having their positions reflected through an arbitrary point (corresponding to a parity inversion), all momenta reversed (corresponding to a time inversion) and with all matter replaced by antimatter (corresponding to a charge inversion)—would evolve under exactly the same physical laws. The CPT transformation turns the universe into its "mirror image" and vice versa. Quantum uncertainty causes the universe and antiuniverse to not be exact mirror images of each other. CPT symmetry is recognized to be a fundamental property of physical laws; but a mirror anti-universe remains theoretical.

The universe/anti-universe pair emerged from the Big Bang epochs directly into a hot, radiation-dominated era. The anti-universe would flow back in time from the Big Bang, becoming bigger as it does so, and would be also dominated by antimatter. Its spatial properties are inverted if compared to those in the universe, a situation analogous to creating electron–positron pairs in a vacuum. This model, developed by physicists Latham Boyle and Neil Turok, proposes that temperature fluctuations in the cosmic microwave background (CMB) are due to the quantum-mechanical nature of space-time near the Big Bang singularity.

This model provides a natural explanation for the observed baryon asymmetry: the mirror universe is dominated by antimatter in the same way that the observed universe is dominated by matter.

Gogberashvili & Tsiskaridze (2026) derived a mirror universe that is the parity and time inverse of the universe (PT), implying that a mirror universe may exist even if charge parity does not; however, the authors then continued to apply their model under CPT symmetry.

=== Dark energy ===
A mirror universe might provide an explanation for dark energy, as dark energy could be conceptualized as the entanglement energy between the universe/anti-universe pair. Under this theory, the entropy of the universe and anti-universe collectively cancel out, implying a zero-energy universe.
