= Youniverse (Sawthis album) =

Studio album by Sawthis
- Released: 30 September 2013
- Genre: Thrash metal; groove metal
- Length: 38:47
- Label: Bakerteam
- Producer: Paolo Ojetti

Sawthis chronology
Egod (2010)	Youniverse (2013)	Babhell (2017)

Singles from Youniverse
- 1. "The Crowded Room" Released: 8 April 2013; 2. "The Waking Up" Released: 27 September 2013

Professional ratings
Review scores
Source	Rating
Metal Temple	8/10
Stereo Killer	2/5

Youniverse is the third studio album by Italian metal band Sawthis. The album was released on 30 September 2013 through Bakerteam Records. The record is a concept album about multiple personality disorder, with "The Crowded Room" being inspired by Billy Milligan. Music videos have been released for the songs "The Crowded Room" and "The Waking Up".

== Track listing ==
All lyrics are written by Alessandro Falà; all music is composed by Michele Melchiorre.

No.	Title	Length
1.	"The Logical Colors"	3:38
2.	"The Waking Up"	3:33
3.	"The Voice Falls On Me"	3:00
4.	"The Disturbed" (featuring Rob Cavestany)	2:53
5.	"The Crowded Room"	3:29
6.	"The Indeleble"	4:00
7.	"The Impure Soul"	3:33
8.	"The Spotlight"	3:44
9.	"The Mad"	3:25
10.	"The Switch"	3:23
11.	"The Walking"	4:09
Total length:		38:47

== Personnel ==
- Alessandro Falà – vocals
- Marco Di Carlo – lead guitar
- Janos Murri – rhythm guitar
- Gaetano Ettorre – bass
- Michele Melchiorre – drums
