= Multiverse Network =

American startup company

The Multiverse Network, Inc.
- Type: Private
- Industry: Online Games
- Founded: July 2004
- Headquarters: Mountain View, California, USA
- Key people: Bill Turpin, Co-founder & CEO Rafhael Cedeno, Co-founder & CTO; Corey Bridges, Co-founder, Executive Producer and Marketing Director Robin McCollum, Co-founder & Principal Engineer, Client Technology
- Website: www.multiversemmo.com

The Multiverse Network, Inc. was an American startup company creating a network and platform for massively multiplayer online games (MMOGs) and 3D virtual worlds. Multiverse's stated aim was to lower the barrier of entry for development teams by providing a low-cost software platform for online game and virtual world development.

In 2009, the company extended its development platform to support Flash and built a series of real-time multiplayer games to demo the technology. As part of the worldwide marketing effort behind James Cameron's film Avatar, Multiverse built two Flash-based games, one with McDonald's and another with Coca-Cola Zero. Both games allow players to explore Pandora, where much of the film takes place.

In late 2011, Multiverse closed from lack of profits, releasing the source code to the Multiverse Foundation, a nonprofit group of volunteers who are presently updating the platform.

== Technology ==
Multiverse provided technology known as MMOG middleware (Multiverse used the term platform). It included the client software Multiverse World Browser (for Microsoft Windows only), a server suite, development tools, sample assets, documentation, and a developer community. The goal was to provide consumers/users with a single client program that let them visit all of the virtual worlds built on the Multiverse Platform. From the consumer point of view, this enabled a de facto network of virtual worlds.

Like RealmForge, the Multiverse World Browser was written in C#, and based on the Axiom Engine. The Multiverse server suite was written in Java and used a publish/subscribe messaging system to provide reliability and scalability. The server also provided a plug-in API. The Windows-based tools used the COLLADA data interchange format, to enable artists to import 3D assets from popular tools such as Maya, 3D Studio Max, and Google SketchUp.

== Business model ==
Multiverse provided its technology platform cost-free for development and deployment. Income came through revenue-sharing; Multiverse took a share of any payments made by consumers/users to the world developer. If a developer provided a world for free (or free for a period of time), Multiverse did not charge anything. When a developer started charging consumers/users, Multiverse took a share (10 percent), and also handled the financial transaction processing. Development teams hosted their own servers and retained 100 percent of their world's IP.

James Cameron joined the company's board of advisors, and Red Herring magazine selected it as one of the "Red Herring 100" privately held companies that play a leading role in innovating the technology business.

In December, 2006, Multiverse announced that it had optioned the rights to develop an MMOG based on Firefly, the science fiction television series. In 2008, Buffy and Titanic games were announced. None of them ever came to fruition.

== Open source ==
After closing shop, the Multiverse Network released its code as open source under the MIT License. It is now managed through the Multiverse Foundation.
