= Omniverse =

Omniverse may refer to:

- Ben 10: Omniverse, a series part of the Ben 10 franchise
- Omniverse .:. Frequency, a 2002 album by Rake
- Omniverse, a 1970s-era fanzine produced by Mark Gruenwald
- Nvidia Omniverse, a graphics collaboration platform

== See also ==
- Megaverse (disambiguation)
- Metaverse (disambiguation)
- Multiverse (disambiguation)
- Universe (disambiguation)
