= Parallel universe =

Parallel universe may refer to:

== Science ==
- Many-worlds interpretation of quantum mechanics, which implies the existence of parallel universes
- Multiverse, the sum of all universes, e.g. everything that exists
- Mirror universe, a model that proposes a universe/anti-universe pair

== Philosophy ==
- Possible world, a construct in metaphysics to bring rigor to talk of logical possibility
- Modal realism, an account of possible worlds according to which they are all just as real as the actual world
- Extended modal realism, the view that all worlds, possible as well as impossible, are as real as the actual world

== Arts and media ==
- Parallel universes in fiction, a hypothetical self-contained plane of existence, co-existing with one's own
- Alternate history, a genre of fiction in which historical events differ from reality
- Alternative universe (fan fiction), fiction by fan authors that departs from the fictional universe of the source work

=== Literature, film, and television ===
- "Parallel Universe" (Red Dwarf), a 1988 TV episode
- Parallel Universes (film), a 2001 British TV documentary
- Mirror Universe (Star Trek), a fictional parallel universe in the Star Trek franchise

=== Music ===
- Parallel Universe (4hero album) or the title song, 1994
- Parallel Universe (Garnet Crow album), 2010
- Parallel Universe, an album by Plain White T's, 2018
- "Parallel Universe" (song), by the Red Hot Chili Peppers, 1999
- Parallel Dimensions (album), by Perseo Miranda, 2008

== See also ==
- Metaverse, a collective virtual shared space
- Alternate reality (disambiguation)
- Multiverse (disambiguation)
- Otherworld
- Parallel World (disambiguation)
