= Universe (Sarah Slean EP) =

EP by Sarah Slean
- Released: Cassette: 1997, CD: May 1998
- Genre: Rock
- Length: 31:56
- Label: Independent
- Producer: Sarah Slean

Sarah Slean chronology
Universe (1997)	Blue Parade (1999)

Universe is the first EP by Canadian artist Sarah Slean.

Professional ratings
Review scores
Source	Rating
Allmusic	link

== Track listing ==
1. "Weight"
2. "I Know"
3. "Angel"
4. "Me and Jerome"
5. "Universe"
6. "Pie Jesu"

=== CD release hidden tracks ===
7. "John XXIII" (hidden track)
8. "Climbing up the Walls" (Radiohead cover from OK Computer) (hidden track)

== Personnel ==
- Sarah Slean – piano, vocals
- Sharon Tiessen – cello
- Christine Paul – violin
- Mark Mariash – drums, percussion
- Michael Cooper – basses, keyboard bass
- Chris Emmink – electric guitar noises
