= Megaverse =

Megaverse may refer to:

- Megaversal system, role-playing game mechanics designed for Palladium Books
- "Megaverse," a song by Stray Kids
- Multiverse, or megaverse, any hypothetical set of multiple universes in cosmology and other disciplines

== See also ==
- Metaverse (disambiguation)
- Multiverse (disambiguation)
- Omniverse (disambiguation)
- Universe (disambiguation)
