= Erga Edizioni =

- Founded: 1964 (Genova, Italy)
- Headquarters: Genova, Italy
- Key people: Marcello Merli
- Products: Publishing of books and magazines, advertising, CD
- Services: Bookshops

Erga Edizioni, is a publishing company based in Genoa, Italy. It was founded on 1964 by Marcello Merli.

== History ==
Erga started publishing some books about the history and culture of Genova. Over time his production embraced much more areas of interest, from oriental to occidental philosophy, nutrition, food, free time, tourism, architecture and other.

Starting on 2008 Erga Editions has published also many music CD. It released over 20 titles till yet, between them Sandro Giacobbe - 35 anni di successi, Perseo Miranda - A silence that screams, and many classic music cd as Nabucco (Giuseppe Verdi)
