= Agglutination Metal Festival =

Annual metal festival in Basilicata, Italy

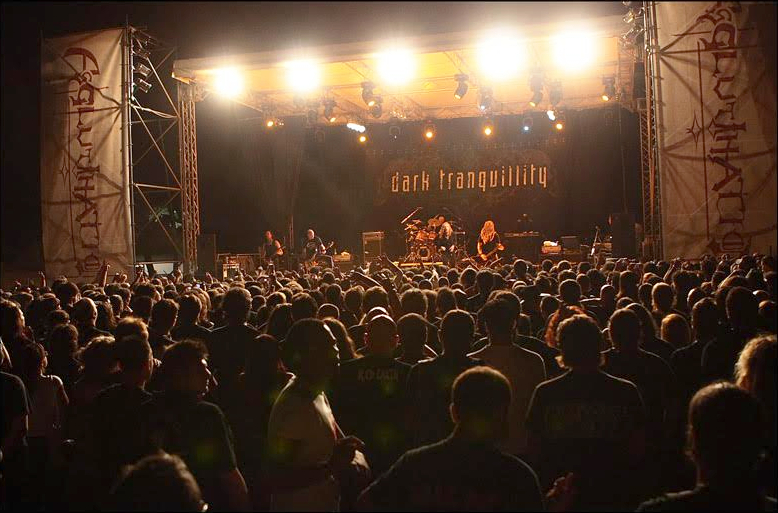
- Dark Tranquillity at the Agglutination Metal Festival 2008
- Genre: Metal
- Dates: August
- Locations: Sant'Arcangelo, Italy; Chiaromonte, Italy; Senise, Italy
- Years active: 1995 – 2023
- Website: Agglutination.it

Agglutination Metal Festival was an Italian metal festival held annually in Basilicata, among the towns of Senise, Chiaromonte and Sant'Arcangelo (Potenza). Born in 1995 as an event to promote emerging groups, it was one of the first metal festivals in Italy and one of the most long-lived metal events in Europe.

It hosted bands such as Overkill, Cannibal Corpse, Venom, Mayhem, Stratovarius, Carcass, Exodus, Gamma Ray, Dark Tranquillity and Marduk. Among the Italian bands that performed at the Agglutination are Rhapsody of Fire, Bulldozer, Necrodeath, Stormlord, Labyrinth and Theatres des Vampires. Due to the containment measures against the COVID-19 pandemic, the festival was not scheduled in 2020 and 2021. Following prolonged financial and organizational difficulties, the event staged its final edition in 2023, though no official announcement concerning its permanent closure was ever made by the organization.

== Lineups ==
=== 1995 ===
August in Chiaromonte
Marshall and other local bands

=== 1996 ===
August in Chiaromonte
White Skull, Lost Innocence and other local bands

=== 1997 ===
12 August in Chiaromonte
Overkill, White Skull, Megora, Aggressive Fear, In Human Memories, Deleterio, Black Sunrise, Flash Terrorist, Stormlord, Lost Innocence, Harem, Funeral Fuck

=== 1998 ===
11 August in Chiaromonte
Athena, Undertakers, Lacrima Christi, Heimdall, Glacial Fear, Inchiuvatu, Hastings, Aura, Memories of a Lost Soul, Unthory, Black Sunrise, Funeral Fuck

=== 1999 ===
13 August in Chiaromonte
White Skull, Moonlight Comedy, Ahriman, Tenebrae Oburiuntur, Obscure Devotion, 3rd, Terremoto, Kiss of Death, Pino Miale

=== 2000 ===
12 August in Chiaromonte
Domine, Vision Divine, Undertakers, Glacial Fear, Stormlord, Art Inferno, Arcadia, Steel Cage, Humanity Eclipse, Eden Shape

=== 2001 ===
11 August in Chiaromonte
Ancient, Thoten, White Skull, Secret Sphere, Highlord, The Black, Natron, Schizo, Glacial Fear, Requiem K626, Brazen, Enemynside, Dark Secret, Rainy Night

=== 2002 ===
12 August Chiaromonte
Destruction, Vicious Rumors, Drakkar, Undertakers, Stormlord, Heimdall, Infernal Poetry, Holy Knights, Adimiron

=== 2003 ===
9 August in Chiaromonte
Virgin Steele, Labyrinth, Theatres des Vampires, Beholder, Fire Trails, Elvenking, Marshall, Rosae Crucis, Mantra, Requiem K626, Hunchback

=== 2004 ===
12 August in Chiaromonte
Iron Savior, Marduk, Crystal Ball, Novembre, Centurion, Thy Majestie, Rain, Nameless Crime, Disguise, Walkyrya

=== 2005 ===
13 August in Chiaromonte
Mayhem, Freedom Call, Necrodeath, Mesmerize, Schizo, Valiance

=== 2006 ===
10 August in Chiaromonte (cancelled)
Vision Divine, Sinister, Majesty, Dark Lunacy, Marshall, Pandaemonium, Kragens, Aleph, Infernal Angels, Megawatt

=== 2007 ===
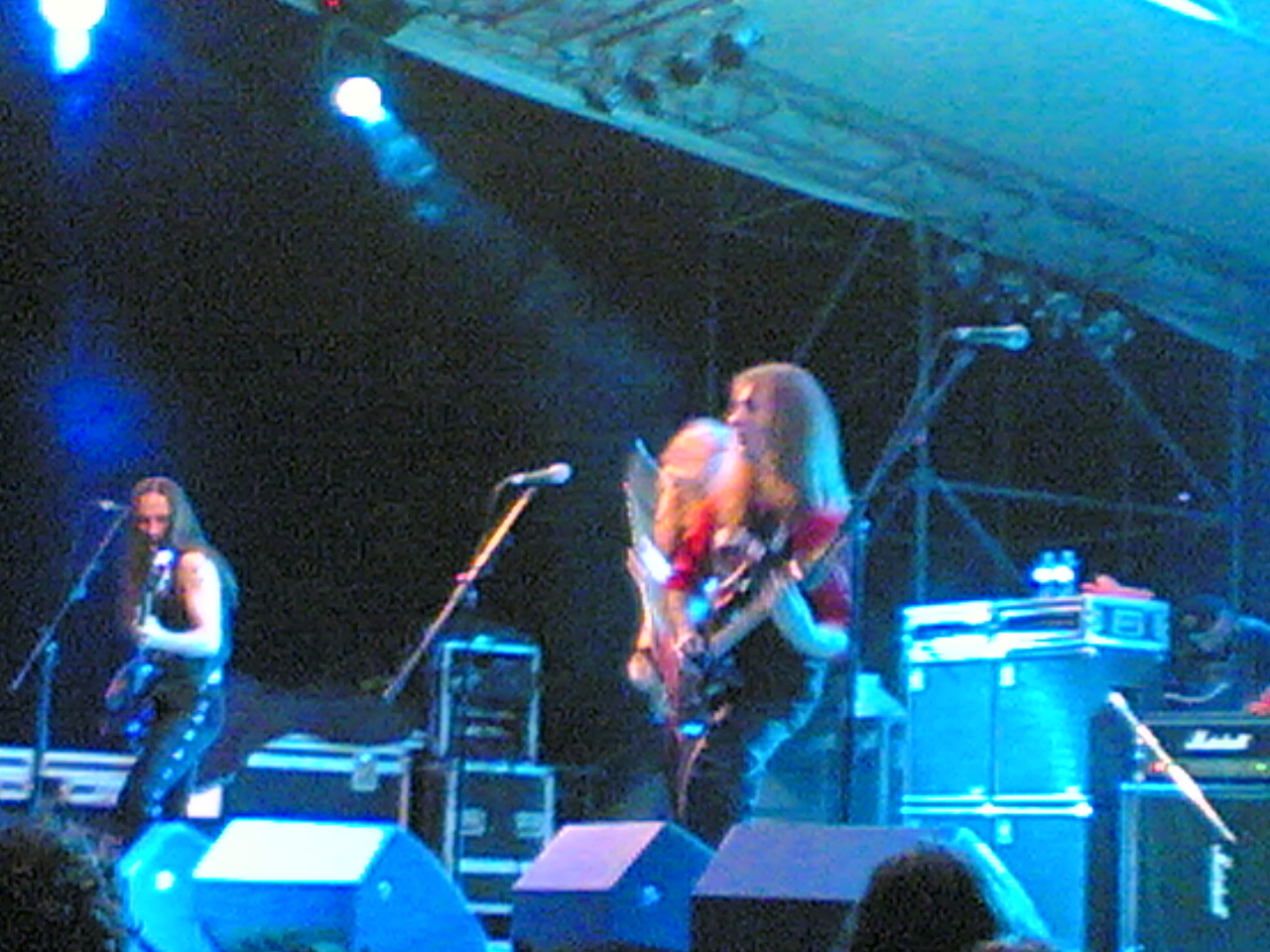
Gamma Ray at the Agglutination Metal Festival 2007

11 August in Sant'Arcangelo
Gamma Ray, Infernal Death, Golem, Kaledon, Dark Lunacy, Fire Trails, Tankard

=== 2008 ===
9 August 2008 in Sant'Arcangelo
Dark Tranquility, Vision Divine, Dismember, Domine, Metal Gang with Pino Scotto, DGM, Savior from Anger, Denied, Nefertum

=== 2009 ===
10 August in Sant'Arcangelo
U.D.O., Vader, Extrema, Fabio Lione, Forgotten Tomb, Fratello Metallo, Trick or Treat, Ecnephias, Symbolyc

=== 2010 ===
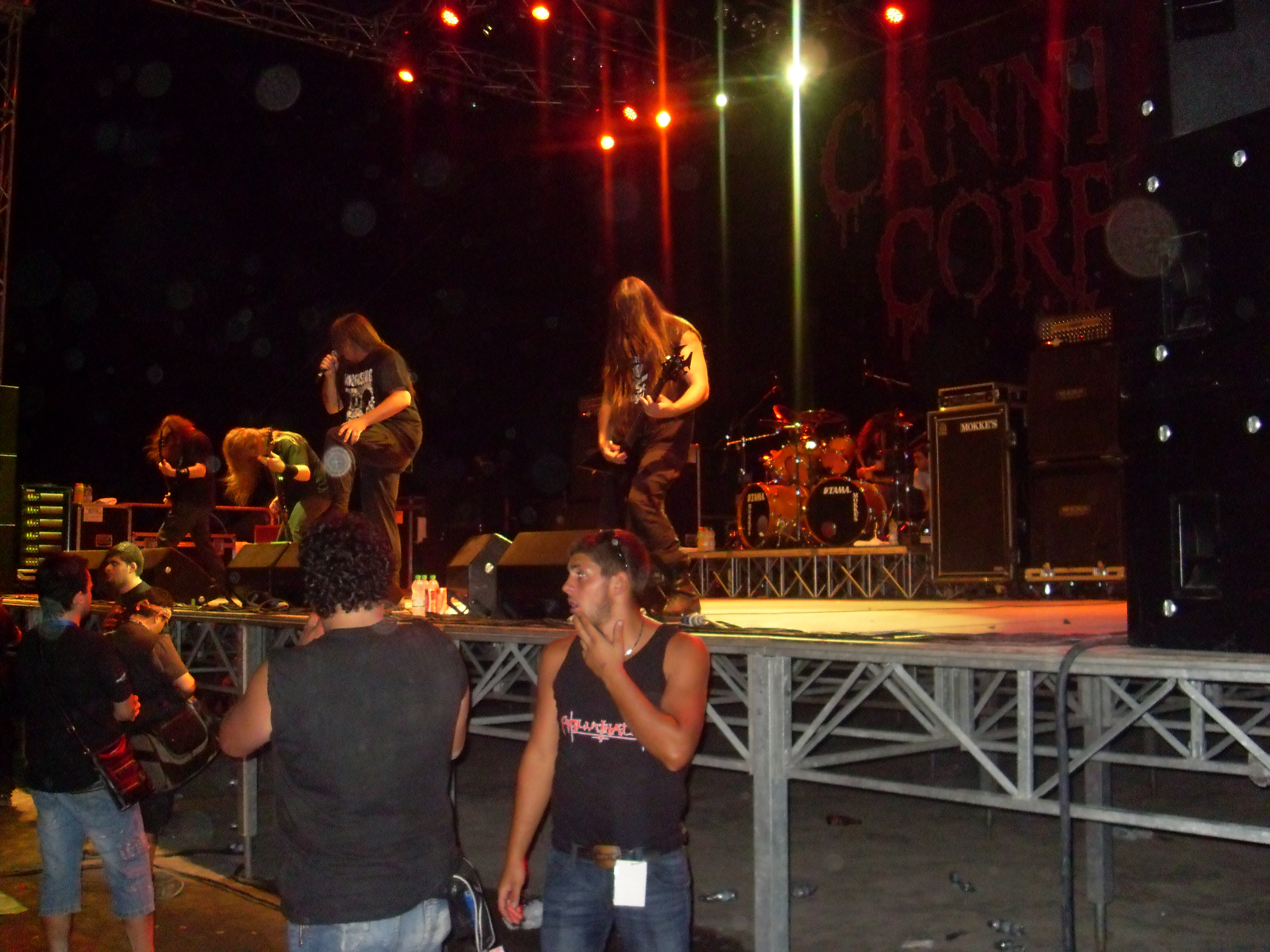
Cannibal Corpse at the Agglutination Metal Festival 2010

9 August in Sant'Arcangelo
Cannibal Corpse, Korpiklaani, Pino Scotto, Handful of Hate, Airborn, Marshall, Ver Sacrum, Solisia

=== 2011 ===
20 August in Chiaromonte
Bulldozer, Majesty, Bömbers (feat. Abbath), Node, PTSD, Tyrannizer Order, Aura, Stige

=== 2012 ===
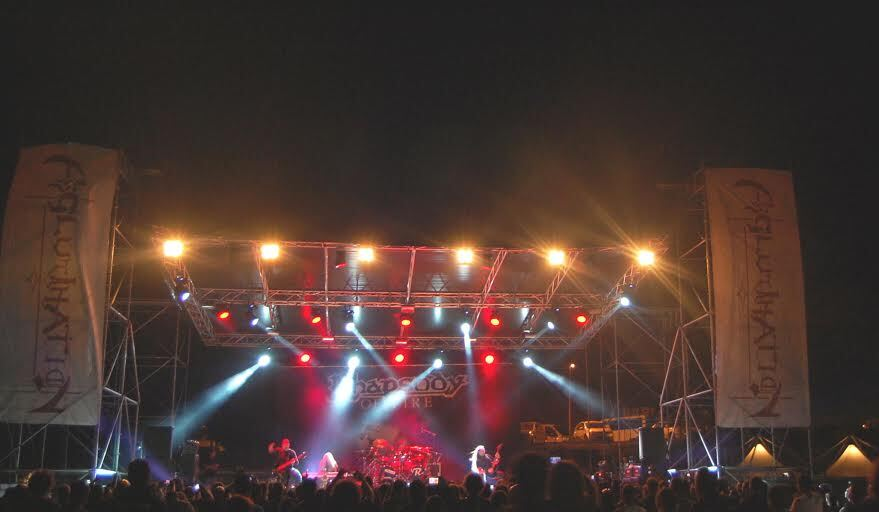
Rhapsody of Fire at the Agglutination Metal Festival 2012

25 August in Chiaromonte
Dark Tranquillity, Rhapsody of Fire, Rotting Christ, Ecnephias, Vexed, Lunocode, Poemisia, Twilight Gate, Ghost Booster

=== 2013 ===
10 August in Senise
Overkill, Stratovarius, Marduk, Eldritch, Folkstone, Heavenshine, Blind Horizon, Rebürn

=== 2014 ===
23 August in Senise
Carcass, Entombed A.D., Belphegor, Buffalo Grillz, Elvenking, Eversin, Sinheresy, Lehman

=== 2015 ===
9 August in Chiaromonte
Obituary, Edguy, Inquisition, Necrodeath, Forgotten Tomb, Arthemis, Feline Melinda, Carthagods

=== 2016 ===
21 August in Chiaromonte
Therion, Exodus, Taake, Fleshgod Apocalypse, Nanowar of Steel, Dewfall, De La Muerte, Real Chaos

=== 2017 ===
19 August in Chiaromonte
Venom, Sodom, White Skull, In.Si.Dia, Assaulter, Gravestone, Ghost of Mary, Memories of a Lost Soul

=== 2018 ===
19 August in Chiaromonte
Death SS, Pestilence, Folkstone, Necrodeath, Witchunter, Ad Noctem Funeriis, Circle of Witches, Rome in Monochrome

=== 2019 ===
17 August in Chiaromonte
Napalm Death, Death Angel, Carpathian Forest, Strana Officina, Carthagods, The Black, Scream Baby Scream

=== 2022 ===
6 August in Senise
Asphyx, Nargaroth, Vanexa, Fulci, Sailing To Nowhere, Napoli Violenta, Funeral, Mirko Gisonte, Eyelids

=== 2023 ===
12 August in Chiaromonte
Carcass, Nocturnal Depression, Sacrilege, Plakkaggio, Xenos, Essenza, Coexistence
