= Gods of Metal =

Italian metal music festival

- Genre: Heavy metal; extreme metal
- Dates: June
- Location: Italy
- Years active: 1997 – 2016
- Website: Godsofmetal.it

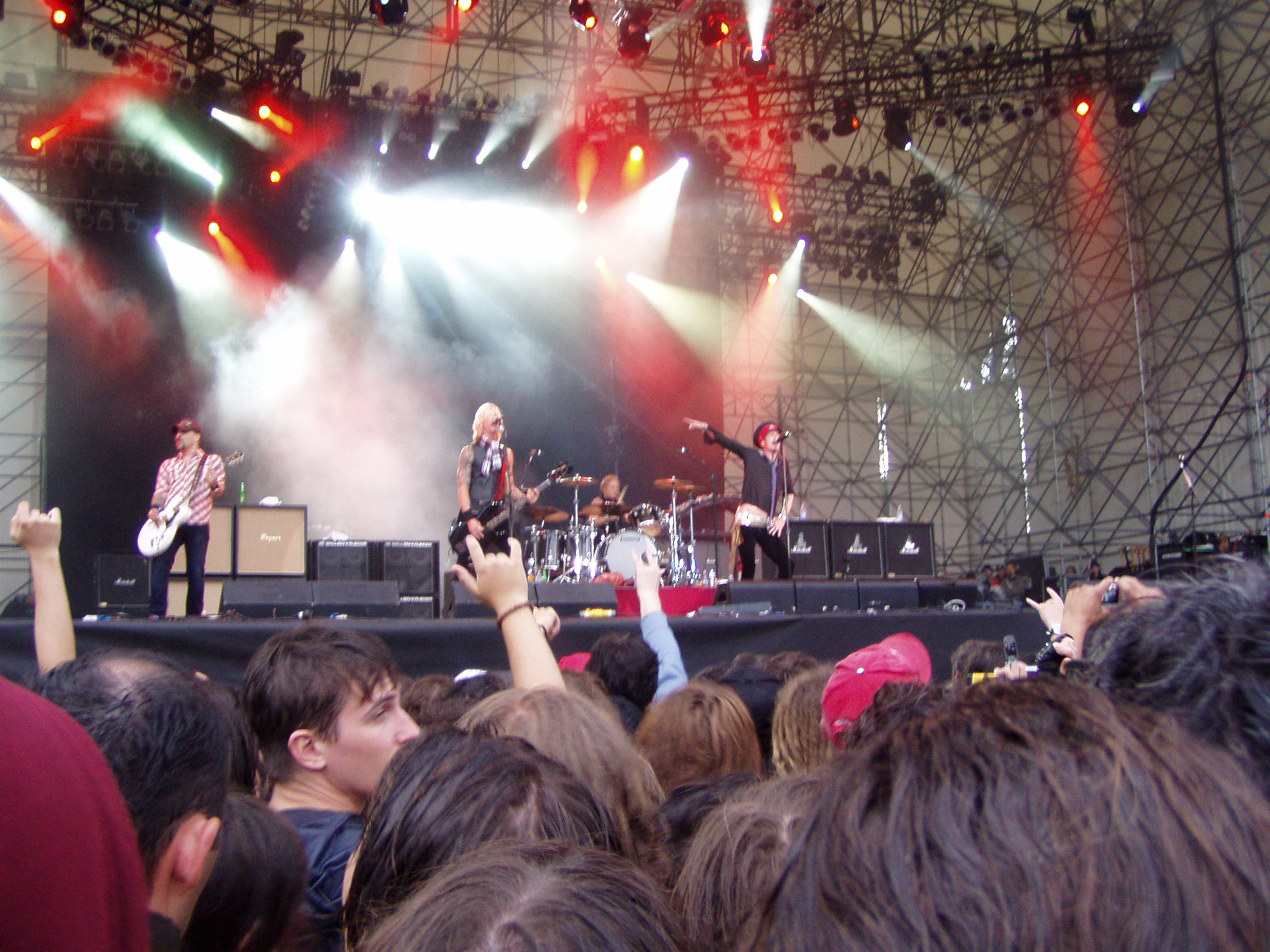
Velvet Revolver performing at Gods of Metal 2007

Gods of Metal was the biggest Italian metal festival, held annually from 1997 to 2016. It took place in early summer, usually on the first or second weekend of June. It was most often held at venues in or near Milan, but took place in Bologna three times and one time in Turin. It was acquired by Live Nation in 2010.

== Lineups ==
=== 1997 ===
Held on 7 June at Palavobis in Milan.

Saturday 7 June

Manowar
Angra
Rage
Grave Digger
Moonspell
Time Machine
Eldritch

=== 1998 ===
Held on 6 June at Forum Open Air Arena in Milan.

Saturday 6 June

Black Sabbath
Pantera
Helloween
Stratovarius
Gamma Ray
Blind Guardian
Iced Earth
Coal Chamber
Labyrinth

=== 1999 ===
Held on 5-6 June at Forum Open Air Arena in Assago-Milan.

Saturday 5 June	Sunday 6 June
Metallica; Stratovarius; Mercyful Fate; Biohazard; Overkill; Monster Magnet; Space Age Playboys; Lacuna Coil; Cappanera; PWR	Manowar; Motörhead; Angra; HammerFall; Iron Savior; Nevermore; Labyrinth; Time Machine; Skyclad; Avalon; Headstone Epitaph

=== 2000 ===
Held on 10-11 June at Stadio Brianteo in Monza.

Saturday 10 June	Sunday 11 June
Iron Maiden; Demons and Wizards; Dark Tranquillity; Sentenced; Edguy; Domine; Dirty Deeds; Khali; Theatres des Vampires	Slayer; Slipknot; Methods of Mayhem; Testament; In Flames; The Kovenant; Death SS; Necrodeath; Magazzini Della Comunicazione

=== 2001 ===
Held on 9 June at Palavobis in Milan.

Saturday 9 June

Judas Priest
Megadeth
Savatage
Motörhead
Gamma Ray
Cradle of Filth
Rhapsody
W.A.S.P.
Nevermore
Kamelot
Wine Spirit
Eldritch
Benediction
Beholder
Sungift
Secret Sphere
Centurion
Sigma

=== 2002 ===
Held on 8-9 June at Stadio Brianteo in Monza.

Saturday 8 June	Sunday 9 June
Slayer; Rammstein (cancelled); Halford; Kreator; Sodom; My Dying Bride; SOiL; Ill Niño; Anti-Product; Mushroomhead; Node	Manowar; Blind Guardian; Running Wild; Shaman; Symphony X Virgin Steele; Domine; Doro; Metalium; Blaze; Time Machine

=== 2003 ===
Held on 8 June at Palavobis in Milan.

Sunday 8 June

Whitesnake
Queensrÿche
Motörhead
Saxon
Destruction
Grave Digger
Angra
Pain of Salvation
Vision Divine
Thoten
Mantra
DGM
Madhouse

=== 2004 ===
Held on 5-6 June at Arena Parco Nord in Bologna.

Saturday 5 June	Sunday 6 June
Judas Priest; Stratovarius; UFO; Nevermore; Symphony X Anathema; Rage; Domine; Into Eternity; Dark Lunacy	Alice Cooper; Testament; Motörhead; Twisted Sister; W.A.S.P. Quireboys; Sodom; Naglfar; Stormlord; Through Solace; DragonForce

Due to heavy rain, the UFO concert was cancelled and Stratovarius played the next day, between the Quireboys and W.A.S.P.

=== 2005 ===
Held on 11-12 June at Arena Parco Nord in Bologna.

Saturday 11 June	Sunday 12 June
Iron Maiden; Slayer; Lacuna Coil; Obituary; Strapping Young Lad; DragonForce; Mastodon; Mudvayne; Evergrey	Mötley Crüe; Megadeth; Anthrax; Accept; Yngwie Malmsteen; Black Label Society; HammerFall; Extrema; Exilia

=== 2006 ===
Held on 1-4 June at Idroscalo in Milan.

Thursday 1 June	Friday 2 June	Saturday 3 June	Sunday 4 June
Venom; Dimmu Borgir (cancelled); Opeth; Down; Testament; Nevermore; Satyricon; Sodom; Amorphis; Cappanera	Strana Officina; Fire Trails; Extrema; Vision Divine; Necrodeath; Domine; Novembre; Stormlord; Infernal Poetry; White Skull; Mellowtoy; Boom; Perfect Picture	Whitesnake; Def Leppard; Motörhead; Helloween; Stratovarius; Gamma Ray; Angra; Edguy; Sonata Arctica; Crucified Barbara	Guns N' Roses; Korn; Deftones; Alice in Chains; Stone Sour; Soulfly; Bloodsimple; DragonForce; Hellfueled; Benedictum; 10 Years

=== 2007 ===
Held on 2-3 and 30 June at Idroscalo in Milan.

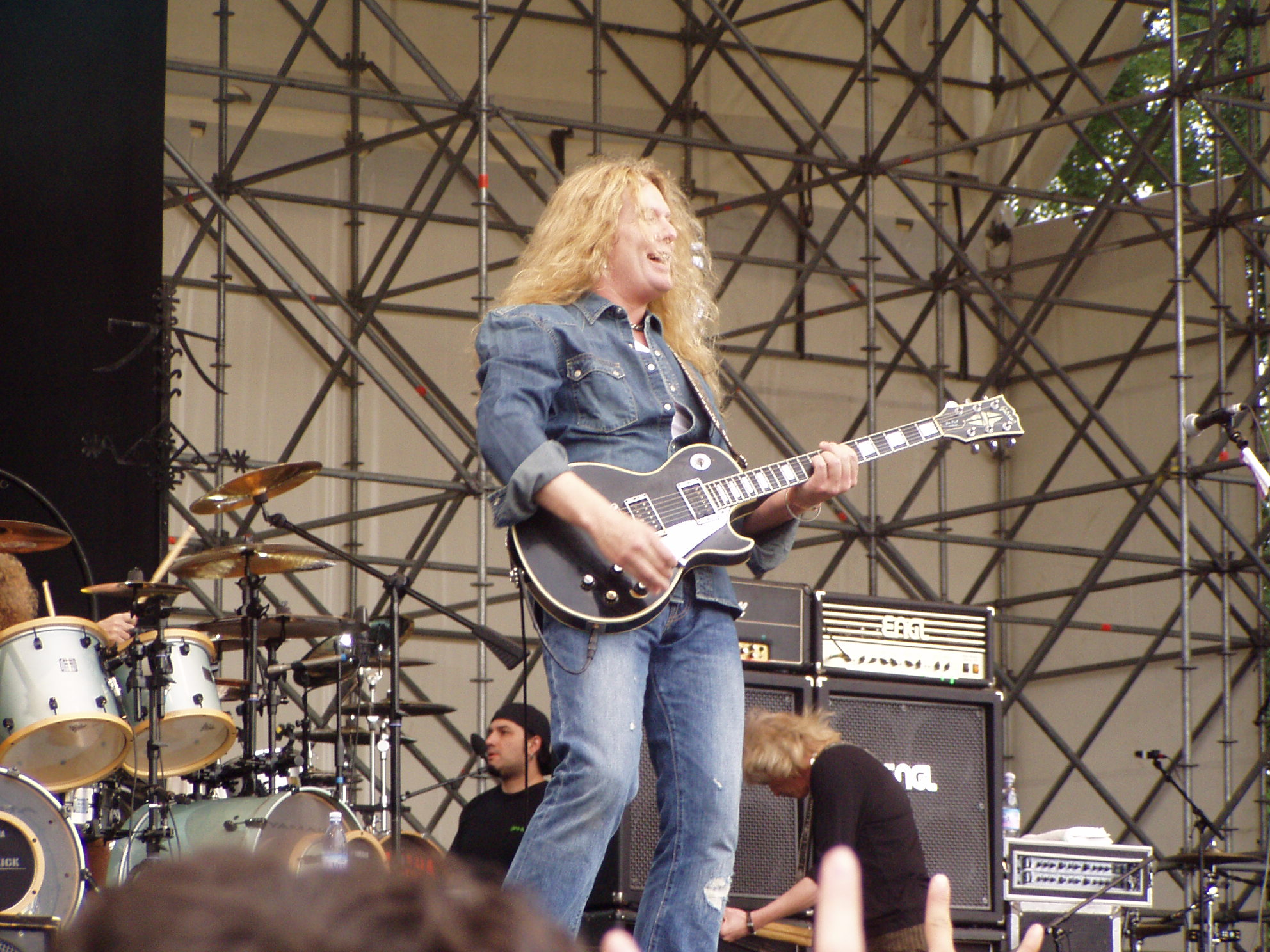
John Sykes with Thin Lizzy the Monsters of Rock Festival Milan, Italy 2007

Saturday 2 June	Sunday 3 June	Saturday 30 June
Mötley Crüe; Velvet Revolver; Scorpions; Thin Lizzy; White Lion; Tigertailz; Eldritch; Planet Hard	Heaven & Hell; Dream Theater; Blind Guardian; Dimmu Borgir; Dark Tranquillity; Symphony X Anathema; DGM	Ozzy Osbourne; Korn; Megadeth; Black Label Society; Type O Negative; Sadist; Deathstars; Slowmotion Apocalypse

=== 2008 ===
Held on 27-29 June at Arena Parco Nord in Bologna

Friday 27 June	Saturday 28 June	Sunday 29 June
Iron Maiden; Avenged Sevenfold; Rose Tattoo; Apocalyptica; Airbourne; Lauren Harris; Black Tide; Kingcrow	Slayer; Carcass; Meshuggah; Testament; At the Gates; The Dillinger Escape Plan; Between the Buried and Me; Stormlord; Brain Dead	Judas Priest; Iced Earth; Yngwie Malmsteen; Morbid Angel; Obituary; Enslaved; Fratello Metallo; Infernal Poetry; Nightmare

=== 2009 ===
Held on 27-28 June at Stadio Brianteo in Monza

Saturday 27 June		Sunday 28 June	
L Stage	R Stage (Crüe Fest Stage)	L Stage	R Stage
Heaven and Hell; Queensrÿche; Edguy; Epica; Voivod; Extrema	Mötley Crüe; Tesla; Lita Ford; Marty Friedman; Backyard Babies; Lauren Harris	Dream Theater; Blind Guardian; Tarja Turunen; Saxon (cancelled); Cynic; Black Dahlia Murder	Slipknot; Carcass; Down; Mastodon; Napalm Death; Static-X

=== 2010 ===
Held on 25-27 June at Parco della Certosa Reale in Collegno

Stage 1

25 June	26 June	27 June
Killswitch Engage; Fear Factory; DevilDriver; As I Lay Dying; Atreyu; Job for a Cowboy; Unearth; 36 Crazyfists	Lordi; Amon Amarth; Raven; Exodus; Behemoth; Orphaned Land; Sadist; Ex Deo	Motörhead; Bullet for My Valentine; Cannibal Corpse; U.D.O. Saxon; Devin Townsend Project; Labyrinth; Sabaton

Stage 2

25 June	26 June	27 June
Amphitrium; Dragonia; Death Army	Nashwuah; Subhuman; Kaledon	Soulfly; Van Canto; Anvil

=== 2011 ===
Held on 22 June at Arena Fiera, Rho

Judas Priest
Whitesnake
Europe
Mr. Big
Cradle of Filth
Epica
Duff McKagan's Loaded
Cavalera Conspiracy
Baptized in Blood

=== 2012 ===
Held on 21-24 June at Arena Fiera, Rho

21 June	22 June	23 June	24 June
Manowar; Children of Bodom; Amon Amarth; Unisonic; Cannibal Corpse; HolyHell; Adrenaline Mob; Arthemis; Clairvoyants	Guns N' Roses; Within Temptation; Sebastian Bach; Killswitch Engage; Black Stone Cherry; Rival Sons; Soulfly; Ugly Kid Joe; AxeWound; Cancer Bats	Mötley Crüe; Slash featuring Myles Kennedy and The Conspirators; The Darkness; Gotthard; Hardcore Superstar; Black Veil Brides; Lizzy Borden; Planethard	Ozzy and Friends; Opeth; Black Label Society; Lamb of God; Trivium; DevilDriver; August Burns Red; Kobra and the Lotus; I Killed the Prom Queen

=== 2016 ===
Held on 2 June at Autodromo Nazionale Monza in Monza

2 June

Rammstein
Korn
Megadeth
Sixx:A.M.
Gamma Ray
Halestorm
The Shrine
Jeff Angell's Staticland
Planethard
Overtures
