= Innervoid =

Studio album by Eldritch
- Released: 17 November 2023
- Genre: Progressive metal
- Length: 49:10
- Label: Scarlet Records

Eldritch chronology
Eos (2021)	Innervoid (2023)

Innervoid is the thirteenth full-length album by Eldritch, released in 2023 on Scarlet Records.

It was the first Eldritch album without Terence Holler on vocals, being replaced by Alex Jarusso.

== Reception ==
Powermetal.de stated that Eldritch had tried several styles on their twelve preceding albums, and found the right balance on Innervoid. Without reinventing the wheel, this was "a perfectly balanced and captivating blend of melodic, progressive, and power metal, whose beauty and clarity almost brought tears to my eyes". The reviewer would therefore "urge every fan of the musical styles mentioned here not to miss this musical treasure trove", and rated the album 9 out of 10. Almost the entire album provided "wonderful vocal lines, crisp power riffs, orchestral arrangements, atmospherically tranquil, skillfully constructed eruptive uptempo moments, and lighthearted instrumental flourishes", wrapped in a convincing opener and two "truly magnificent" songs to close.

Metal Hammer Italia gave an 85 % score, with Innervoid being "the album of the year" for that particular reviewer. It was "an album that hits the mark, reaching you immediately, hitting the right notes, convincing".

Metal.de gave 8 points, praising the band in the technical department, with the songs being "composed with pinpoint accuracy and presented almost flawlessly. Every note is perfectly placed, the production blasts through the speakers with nuance and power". In the current day, Eldritch had abandonded "kitschy" sounds, and the new singer was "extremely strong". This reviewer also commented Federico Mondelli's cover artwork as "stylish".

Rock Hard gave a markedly lower score, 6.5 out of 10, and Heavymetal.dk only gave 5. Two songs showed promise, but the rest neglected the melodic aspect or were bombastic without "nerve". As with the previous Cracksleep, the reviewer criticized the lyrics as simple. This was regressive metal, not progressive. An even lower score was 2 out of 5 from Inferno.fi, which criticized Innervoid for being exhausting and mechanic: "Loud, high and cannon-like. It's so earth-shattering that you don't have time to focus on the overall pattern properly".

== Track listing ==
1. "Innervoid" – 1:15
2. "Handful of Sand (Right or Wrong)" – 6:48
3. "Born on Cold Ash" – 5:07
4. "Elegy of Lust" – 5:26
5. "To the End" – 5:03
6. "Wings of Emptiness" – 4:54
7. "From the Scars" – 5:02
8. "Lost Days of Winter" – 5:04
9. "Black Bedlam" – 5:03
10. "Forgotten Disciple" – 5:28
