= Eos (Eldritch album) =

Studio album by Eldritch
- Released: 19 November 2021
- Genre: Progressive metal
- Length: 65:23
- Label: Scarlet Records

Eldritch chronology
Cracksleep (2018)	Eos (2021)	Innervoid (2023)

Eos, also stylized EOS is the twelfth full-length album by Eldritch, released in 2021 on Scarlet Records.

It was the last Eldritch album with Terence Holler on vocals. On the other hand, it reintroduced keyboards in their sound, courtesy of rejoined band member Oleg Smirnoff.

== Reception ==
Powermetal.de praised the album for "passion", "brilliant" song ideas and a "multifaceted, sometimes highly complex and abstract blend". With Smirnoff's return, the album was "as varied as it is sometimes far-out". The "prog/power metal foundation" was "interwoven with electronic elements, modern metal influences, and even the occasional jazzy passage" as well as "plenty of melodic rock/AOR sweetness". The score was 8 out of 10. Metal Hammer Italia likewise gave 80 %. Some songs were progressive and complex, but rewarding, and "Eldritch manage to be accessible while still sounding divine". DPRP also gave 8 points and praised the return of keyboardist Oleg Smiroff. "It's as if a kind of magic or chemical essence has been sprinkled upon the band which mystically retrieved their 'Mojo', or whatever else you want to call it. The album rocks, grooves, excites, bursts from dynamics and drive, shows the same divine interplay as found on their early recordings, brings performances of the highest order, sounds tight as hell, feels fresh and contemporary". Eos therefore matched their old high point El Niño.

Dead Rhetoric was slightly higher with 8.5 of 10, whereas Rock Hard gave a slightly lower score, 7.

== Track listing ==
1. "Dead Blossom" – 1:06
2. "Failure of Faith" – 5:44
3. "The Cry of a Nation" – 6:07
4. "Circles" – 7:29
5. "No Obscurity" – 5:41
6. "Sunken Dreams" – 11:08
7. "Fear Me" – 6:31
8. "I Can't Believe It" – 5:24
9. "The Awful Closure" – 5:48
10. "Eos" – 6:43
11. "Runaway" – 3:42 (Bon Jovi cover)
