= Underlying Issues =

Studio album by Eldritch
- Released: November 2015
- Genre: Progressive metal
- Length: 56:02
- Label: Scarlet Records

Eldritch chronology
Tasting the Tears (2014)	Underlying Issues (2015)	Cracksleep (2018)

Underlying Issues is the tenth full-length album by Eldritch, released in 2015 on Scarlet Records.

== Reception ==
Rock Hard rated the album with 7 points out of 10. The same percentage score (rendered as 3.5 out of 5) was given by Dangerdog Music Reviews. Underlying Issues contained an "abundance of riffage, powerful and relentless", taking a slight turn towards thrash metal. Vocalist Terence Holler was "the glue" that held the essential elements together. Dead Rhetoric saw Holler's voice as having "a rare quality to his voice that puts him in unique company". Eldritch continued exploring "heavier/current pastures" with a tint of Annihilator, though they had also included "a little more Forbidden-oriented thrash bursts" on Gaia's Legacy. The score was 8.5. Though Powermetal.de gave a slightly lower score of 8, the reviewer called Underlying Issues a "truly outstanding" album. Eldritch was still marked by "Terence Holler's magnificent, expressive vocals and his melodies", but the lesser use of keyboards made the band "less stylistically outstanding".

== Track listing ==
1. "Changing Blood" – 5:04
2. "Danger Zone" – 5:45
3. "Broken" – 4:07
4. "All and More" – 4:39
5. "The Face I Wear" – 5:31
6. "To the Moon and Back" – 6:36
7. "Bringers of Hate" – 5:38
8. "The Light" – 4:32
9. "Piece of Clarity" – 4:59
10. "Before I Die" – 5:03
11. "Slowmotion K Us" – 4:08
