= Livequake =

Live album by Eldritch (band)
- Released: November 2008
- Recorded: March 22, 2008
- Venue: Music Street Club in Pisa
- Genre: Progressive metal
- Label: Limb Music

Eldritch (band) chronology
Blackenday (2007)	Livequake (2008)	Gaia's Legacy (2011)

Livequake is the first live album by the progressive Italian band Eldritch, recorded at Music Street Club in Pisa.

Metal Hammer Germany wrote that the song selection was a good testament to the band's development and "metamorphosis" over the years. The sound was good too, putting "many a major production to shame in terms of crisp sound and authentically captured atmosphere". Even the bonus material on the DVD was worth watching. Wrote Vampster, the entire set consisted of "a tight, consistently high-quality performance from beginning to end". At the same time, it lacked "any truly exceptional moments" and contained little new for listeners familiar with the band.

Powermetal.de thought the recording showed a band in "top form", playing "with great energy". However, the audience reactions did not become noticeable until disc 2. Metal Temple detracted for the frontman "way too often" calling the audience by "the term 'motherfuckers'".

== Track listing ==
=== CD1 - Blackened Alive ===
1. "In the House - In a Heartbeat (Intro)"
2. "Why"
3. "The Deep Sleep"
4. "Save Me"
5. 'The Blackened Day"
6. "The World Apart"
7. "Reverse"
8. "Standing Still"
9. "Bless Me Now"
10. "The Child That Never Smiles"
11. "More Than Marylin"
12. "This Everlasting Mind Disease"
13. "Silent Flame"
14. "Toil of Mine"

=== CD2 - Incurably Live ===
1. "Fall from Grace (Intro)"
2. "No Direction Home"
3. "Heretic Beholder"
4. "Scar"
5. "Bleed Mask Bleed"
6. "From Dusk Till Dawn"
7. "Nebula Surface"
8. "Ghoulish Gift"
9. "Lord of an Empty Place"
10. "Incurably iII"

=== DVD (Limited Edition) ===
1. Livequake Concert (complete CD1 + CD 2)

==== Extras ====
1. Live in Chicago 2006 (Documentary)
2. Interview with Adriano Dal Canto
3. Interview with the Band at Terence's House
4. Videoclip: "Lonesome Existence"
5. Videoclip: "Save Me"
6. Videoclip: "The Blackened Day"

== Livequake line-up ==
- Terence Holler — vocals
- Eugene Simone — lead & rhythm guitars
- Rob "PEK" Proietti — rhythm guitars and backing vocals
- John Crystal — bass
- Raffahell Dridge — drums

== Guest musicians ==
- Oleg Smirnoff — keyboards on the second part of the show (CD 2)
