= Neighbourhell =

Studio album by Eldritch
- Released: February 24, 2006
- Recorded: Big Wave Recording Studios, April–June 2005
- Genre: Progressive metal
- Length: 45:11
- Label: Limb Music
- Producer: Terence Holler

Eldritch chronology
Portrait of the Abyss Within (2004)	Neighbourhell (2006)	Blackenday (2007)

Neighbourhell is the sixth album by Italian metal band Eldritch. It was released in 2006 and in the limited version contained the video clip for "Save me".

Vampster branded Neighbourhell as "melodic power thrash metal", with Eldritch having added a "thrash edge" since Portrait of the Abyss Within. At the same time, the vocals were versatile, and the band showed "their more melancholic, sensitive side". Powermetal.de found the album to be highly varied, with Eldritch carving out a distinct niche and managing "to surpass the brilliant previous work". The songs were both complex and "highly accessible" at the same time; the lead guitarist in particular was "in top form" and played "some truly ingenious licks". Rock Hard rated the album highly as well, 9 out of 10.

Norwegian magazine Exact rated the album as mediocre, recommending the song "Bless Me Now" but finding the album lacking in songwriting, though the production was good.

== Track listing ==
All music is composed by Terence Holler, Eugene Simone.

No.	Title	Length
1.	"Still Screaming"	5:52
2.	"Save Me"	3:46
3.	"Bless Me Now"	3:04
4.	"The Dark Inside"	3:59
5.	"More Than Marylin"	4:37
6.	"Come To Life"	3:56
7.	"Zero Man"	4:31
8.	"Standing Still"	4:10
9.	"Toil Of Mine"	3:38
10.	"The Rain"	3:59
11.	"Second World"	3:45
Total length:		45:11
