= Tasting the Tears =

Italian metal album

Studio album by Eldritch
- Released: February 17, 2014
- Recorded: Domination Studios, 2013
- Genre: Progressive metal
- Length: 53:00
- Label: Scarlet Records
- Producers: Terence Holler, Eugene Simone

Eldritch chronology
Gaia's Legacy (2011)	Tasting the Tears (2014)	Underlying Issues (2015)

Professional ratings
Review scores
Source	Rating
Rock Hard	8.5/10 stars
Metal.de	7/10 stars
Powermetal.de	8/10 stars
Scream Magazine	5/6 stars

Tasting the Tears is the ninth album by Italian progressive metal band Eldritch, released in 2014 via Scarlet Records.

== Track listing ==
1. "Inside you" - 5:57
2. "Tasting the tears" - 6:07
3. "Alone again" - 5:08
4. "Waiting for something" - 3:21
5. "Seeds of love" - 4:12
6. "The trade" - 4:14
7. "Something strong" - 4:24
8. "Don't Listen" - 3:42
9. "Iris" - 3:29
10. "Love from a stone" - 3:41
11. "Clouds" - 4:34
12. "I Will Remember (Queensrÿche cover)" - 4:05
