= At the Gates of Utopia =

Studio album by Stormlord
- Released: November 23rd, 2001
- Genre: Symphonic black metal Power metal
- Length: 46:54
- Label: Scarlet Records

Stormlord chronology
Supreme Art of War (1999)	At the Gates of Utopia (2001)	The Gorgon Cult (2004)

At the Gates of Utopia is the second studio album by the Italian symphonic black metal band Stormlord. It was released in 2001.

== Track listing ==
No.	Title	Length
1.	"Under the Samnites' Spears"	6:50
2.	"I Am Legend"	5:07
3.	"Xanadu (A Vision in a Dream)"	4:21
4.	"And Winter Was"	4:16
5.	"At the Gates of Utopia" (Instrumental)	2:25
6.	"The Curse of Medusa"	6:33
7.	"The Burning Hope"	6:21
8.	"A Sight Inwards"	4:40
9.	"The Secrets of the Earth"	6:18
Total length:		46:51

== Personnel ==
- Cristiano Borchi - vocals
- Pierangelo Giglioni - Guitar
- Francesco Bucci - Bass
- Simone Scazzocchio - keyboards
- David Folchitto - drums

=== Guests ===
- Volgar dei Xacrestani - opera vocals, narration, clean singing
