= Headquake =

Studio album by Eldritch
- Released: October 1997
- Recorded: May–July 1997
- Genre: Progressive metal
- Length: 55:48
- Label: Inside Out

Eldritch chronology
Seeds of Rage (1995)	Headquake (1997)	El Niño (1998)

Headquake is the second album of Eldritch, released in 1997. Headquake is dedicated to the memory of Luigi Tarantola (1940–1995).

== Track listing ==
1. Ghoulish Gift" - 6:51
2. The Last Embrace" - 6:44
3. Lord of an Empty Place" - 5:31
4. Sometimes in Winter" - 6:20
5. At the Restless Sea" - 7:01
6. Salome's Dance" - 5:28
7. Erase" - 6:08
8. The Quest(ion)" - 5:27
9. Clockwork Bed" - 5:29
10. "Dawn of the Dying" - 6:39
