= Emperor of the Black Runes =

Studio album by Domine
- Released: 2004
- Recorded: May 2003
- Genre: Power metal
- Length: 43:06
- Label: Dragonheart Records; Avalon
- Producer: Enrico Paoli

Emperor of the Black Runes is the fourth album by Domine. It was recorded in May 2003 and released under Japanese label Avalon in February 2004.

== Track listing ==
All tracks by Enrico Paoli

1. "Overture Mortale (Intro)" – 01:09
2. "Battle Gods" – 04:58
3. "Arioch, the Chaos Star" – 05:06
4. "The Aquilonia Suite Part I" – 11:01
5. "The Prince in the Scarlet Robe" – 06:53
6. "Icarus Ascending" – 06:29
7. "The Song of the Swords" – 05:41
8. "The Sun of the New Season" – 08:41
9. "True Believer" – 05:58
10. "The Forest of Light" – 03:28

Bonus song

1. "Altar of the King" (Riot cover, Japanese bonus track) – 4:54

== Personnel ==
=== Band ===
- Enrico Paoli – guitars
- Riccardo Paoli – bass
- Morby – vocals
- Riccardo Iacono – keyboards
- Stefano Bonini – drums

=== Guests ===
- Leanan Sidhe – vocals on "Stormbringer Ruler" and "Emperor Of The Black Runes"
- Patrick Wire – narration on "Emperor Of The Black Runes"

== Lyrical references ==
Source from Domine interview with Strutterzine.

- “The Aquilonia Suite” is based on the Conan The Barbarian books by R.E. Howard
- “Overture Mortale” and “Battle Gods” are, musically inspired by a theme from Mozart’s Don Juan & lyrically by the movie The Legend of Zu
- “Arioch, The Chaos Star” is lyrically loosely based on Michael Moorcock’s books
- “Icarus Ascending” is based on the Greek myth of Icarus
- “The Prince In The Scarlet Robe” is based on the Corum saga by Michael Moorcock
- “The Song Of The Sword” is based on the character of Elric of Melniboné
- “The Forest Of Light” is very loosely inspired by the theme of Tanelorn
