= The Gorgon Cult =

Studio album by Stormlord
- Released: 2004
- Genre: Symphonic black metal; power metal
- Length: 45:16
- Label: Scarlet

Stormlord chronology
At the Gates of Utopia (2001)	The Gorgon Cult (2004)	Mare Nostrum (2008)

The Gorgon Cult is the third studio album by the Italian symphonic black metal band Stormlord. Melodic riffs, high speed double bass intensive drumming, extensive use of keyboards and orchestral parts form the backbone of the record. Also this time band has incorporated some operatic female vocals alongside vocalist Cristiano Borchi who carries on with his style of coupling high pitched screeches with guttural vocals. Clean vocals are also featured on some parts of the album.

AllMusic stated in its review of the album, it "does a more than passable job at competing with the acknowledged Scandinavian masters of the genre."

== Track listing ==
All songs written by Francesco Bucci, except where noted.

The Gorgon Cult track listing
No.	Title	Length
1.	"The Torchbearer" (written by Simone Scazzocchio)	1:00
2.	"Dance of Hecate"	5:09
3.	"Wurdulak"	4:11
4.	"Under the Boards"	5:44
5.	"The Oath of the Legion"	4:53
6.	"The Gorgon Cult"	4:49
7.	"Memories of Lemuria" (written by Simone Scazzocchio)	3:41
8.	"Medusa's Coil"	5:19
9.	"Moonchild" (written by Bruce Dickinson and Steve Harris)	5:02
10.	"Nightbreed" (written by Damnagoras)	5:56
Total length:		51:44

== Personnel ==
- Cristiano Borchi – vocals
- Pierangelo Giglioni – guitar
- Giampaolo Caprino – guitar
- Francesco Bucci – bass
- Simone Scazzocchio – keyboards
- David Folchitto – drums
