= Blackenday =

Studio album by Eldritch
- Released: April 20, 2007
- Recorded: February 2007
- Studio: Big Wave Recording Studios
- Genre: Progressive metal
- Length: 47:11
- Label: Limb Music
- Producer: Terence Holler

Eldritch chronology
Neighbourhell (2006)	Blackenday (2007)	Livequake (2008)

Blackenday is the seventh album by Italian progressive metal band Eldritch, released in 2007 and attended by guest vocalists Ray Alder and Redemption's Nicolas Van Dyk.

Vampster pointed out that Eldritch continued in the power and thrash vein heard on Neighbourhell, while not fully committing to the intensity and still being a progressive metal band "deep in their hearts". The album was therefore "surprisingly inaccessible". Metal Express Radio rated the album as 6 out of 10 as "a bit of a disappointment". Heavymetal.dk gave a 5.

Powermetal.de found the sound and production "absolutely fantastic", with the songs being well written and inviting "powerful headbanging". Rock Hard rated the album highly as well, 8 out of 10.

== Track listing ==
1. "Silent Flame" – 4:47
2. "The Deep Sleep" – 3:23
3. "The Blackened Day" – 4:47
4. "Why?" – 3:38
5. "Black Rain" – 3:29
6. "Broken Road" – 4:53
7. "Rumors" – 5:29
8. "Frozen" – 4:30
9. "The Child That Never Smiles" – 3:23
10. "The Fire" – 3:45
11. "Shallow Water Flood" – 4:32
12. "Never Dawn" – 4:20
