= Mare Nostrum (album) =

Studio album by Stormlord
- Released: May 23, 2008
- Genre: Symphonic black metal; power metal
- Length: 46:50
- Label: Locomotive Music

Stormlord chronology
The Gorgon Cult (2004)	Mare Nostrum (2008)	Hesperia (2013)

Mare Nostrum is the fourth studio album by the Italian symphonic black metal band Stormlord.

== Track listing ==
Mare Nostrum track listing
No.	Title	Length
1.	"Mare Nostrum"	6:47
2.	"Neon Karma"	3:56
3.	"Legacy of the Snake" (Caprino, Bucci, Pierangelo Giglioni)	5:14
4.	"Emet"	5:26
5.	"The Castaway"	5:04
6.	"Scorn" (Caprino, Bucci, Giglioni)	4:19
7.	"And the Wind Shall Scream My Name"	4:43
8.	"Dimension: Hate"	4:49
9.	"Stormlord"	6:32
Total length:		46:50

== Personnel ==
- Christiano Borchi – vocals
- Pierangelo Giglioni – guitars
- Gianpaolo Caprino – guitars, keyboards
- Francesco Bucci – bass
- David Folchitto – drums
