= Nervous System Failure =

Studio album by Infernal Poetry
- Released: June 2009
- Recorded: Potemkin Studios, Bob Studios
- Genre: SchizoMetal
- Length: 41 min.
- Label: Casket/Copro

Professional ratings
Review scores
Source	Rating
TrueMetal	8/10 stars
Metal.it	8/10 stars
Legacy	12/15 stars
Terrorizer	7/10 stars
Heavy Hardes	6/6 stars

Nervous System Failure is the third full-length album by the Italian band Infernal Poetry (fifth studio-album), released on 25 June 2009 through Casket Records, sub-label of Copro.

Truemetal said it is "simply the best extreme record released in Italy after Sadist early years."

== Track listing ==
1. "User Advisory"
2. "Post-split Anathemas"
3. "Forbidden Apples"
4. "Brain Pop-Ups"
5. "They Dance in Circles"
6. "The Heater, The Wall, The Hitter"
7. "The Next Is Mine" (featuring Trevor, from Italian cult band Sadist, as guest vocalist)
8. "Back To Monkey"
9. "La Macchina Del Trapasso"
10. "Pathological Acts at 37 Degrees"
11. "Drive-Gig Drive-Gig"
12. "Wizard Touch pt. 3"
13. "Nervous System Failure"

== Personnel ==
- Daniele Galassi – rhythm guitars, lead guitar
- Christian Morbidoni – rhythm guitars
- Alessandro Infusini – bass
- Paolo Ojetti – lead vocals
- Alessandro Vagnoni – drums, loops
