= Infernal Poetry =

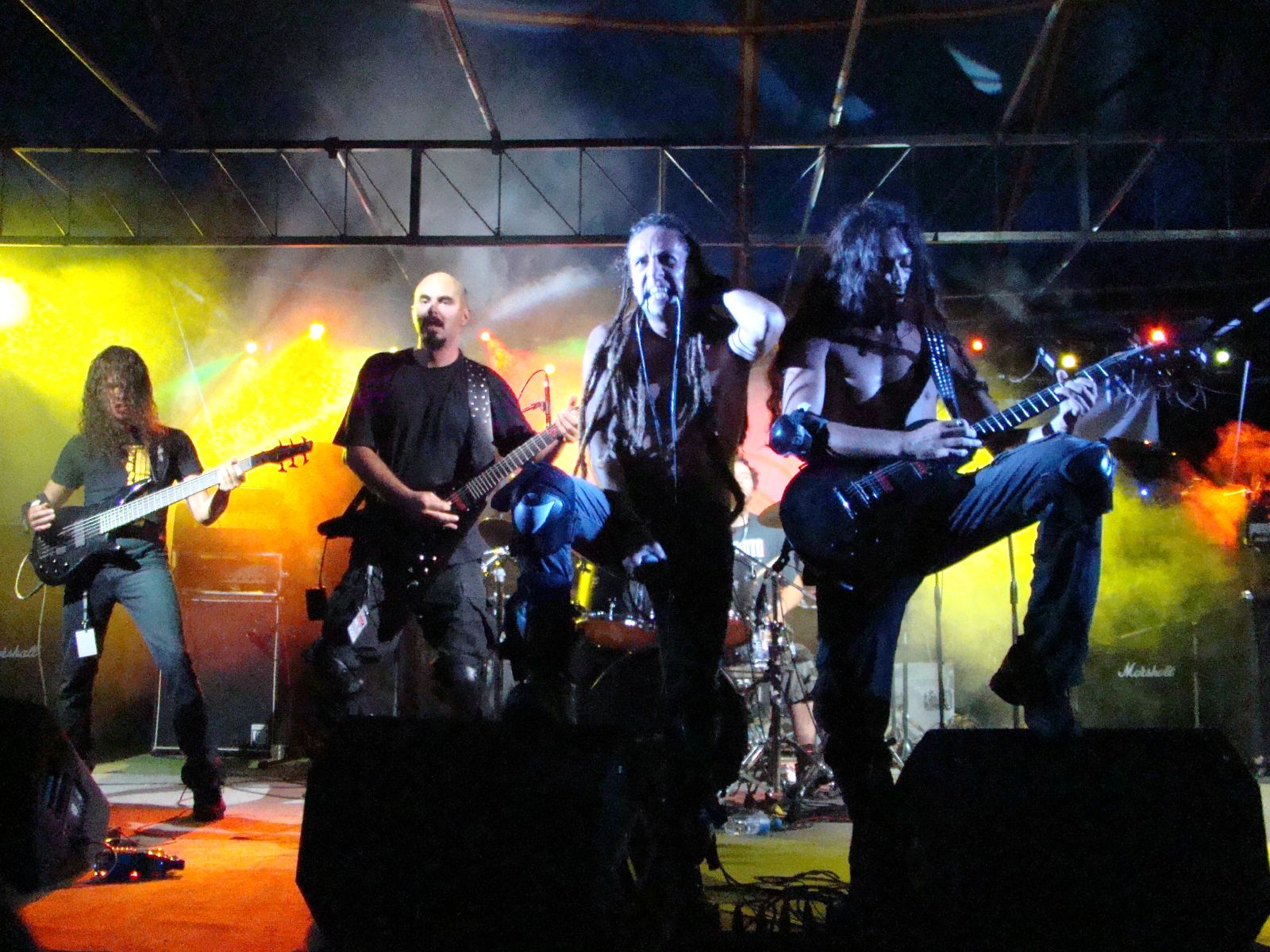
- Infernal Poetry in 2007.

Background information
- Origin: Ancona, Italy
- Genres: Death metal, progressive metal, experimental metal
- Years active: 1996–2014
- Labels: Scarlet, Copro, Red Skies Society, Fuel
- Past members: Daniele Galassi; Paolo Ojetti; Alessandro Infusini; Christian Morbidoni; Alessandro Vagnoni; Andrea Rabuini; Andrea Mastromarco

Infernal Poetry is an Italian death metal band from Ancona, who formed in 1996 and disbanded in 2014. The band started as a death metal act mixing US brutality and Scandinavian melody, adding new elements during 17 years of activities and creating a style that was self-defined as 'Schizo Metal'. The band released four albums, 2 EPs and one split release with Dark Lunacy.

== History ==
At the time of their formation, the band were known as Necronomicon and released the demo Under the Gothic Cathedral under that name. They changed their name in 1997 to Infernal Poetry and released two more demo's, while embarking on a European tour in October/November 2000 alongside Impiety and Rotting Christ.

In March 2001, they signed with Fuel Records for their first album Not Light but Rather Visible Darkness, which was released in January 2002, supported by a video for their song "Hell Spawn". They toured following this album and released a split EP, Twice together with Dark Lunacy in 2003.

The band then continued with their third release and second full album, Beholding the Unpure. The album was praised by Italian media for its creativity and insane atmosphere, the Italian website Metalitalia.com defined Infernal Poetry 'the best extreme metal band in Italy'.

In February 2006, they supported Dismember in their European tour. In June 2006 they have partaken at Gods of Metal 2006 (Arena Parco Nord Bologna), the most important Italian metal festival.

In 2007 they released a 4-track EP titled "Nervous System Checking", anticipating their upcoming third full-length album "Nervous System Failure", scheduled for 2008. In the same year Infernal Poetry performed at Gods of Metal 2008 edition.

In 2008 Infernal Poetry was featured among the most important extreme Italian metal band in a special published on Terrorized magazine (UK)

In May 2009 they released through Copro/Casket their third full-length album titled Nervous System Failure, featuring Trevor from Sadist as singer in two songs. The portal Truemetal.it defined this album 'the best extreme metal album ever made in Italy since Sadist's Tribe'

Paraphiliac (their fourth album) was scheduled for 2012 and released in January 2013. In October 2013 the bands toured in the Balkans as headliner supported by Italian death metal band Aydra and local bands.

In April 2014 the band ceased its activities. In 2019 Infernal Poetry was included in the book 'Metal Progressivo Italiano' (Massimo Salari, Arcana Ed.).

== Line-up ==
- Paolo Ojetti – vocals
- Daniele Galassi – guitars
- Christian Morbidoni – guitars
- Alessandro Infusini – bass
- Alessandro Vagnoni – drums

== Past members ==
- Andrea Rabuini – drums
- Gianvito Tricarico – drums
- Gabriele Gambelli – drums
- Simone Morbidoni – bass
- Andrea Mastromarco – bass, vocals

== Discography ==
=== Albums ===
- Not Light But Rather Visible Darkness (Fuel/Self) (2002)
- Beholding the Unpure (Fuel/Self) (2005)
- Nervous System Failure (Casket/Copro) (2009)
- Paraphiliac (BakerTeam) (2013)

=== EPs ===
- Twice (Split CD) Split CD with Dark Lunacy (Fuel/Self) (2003)
- Nervous System Checking EP (Red Skies Society) (2007)
