= Gaia's Legacy =

Studio album by Eldritch
- Released: September 25, 2011
- Recorded: 2011
- Studio: Big Wave Recording Studios
- Genre: Progressive metal
- Length: 56:30
- Label: Scarlet Records
- Producer: Terence Holler

Eldritch chronology
Blackenday (2007)	Gaia's Legacy (2011)	Tasting the Tears (2014)

Professional ratings
Review scores
Source	Rating
Scream	5/6 stars
Metal.de	6/10 stars
Powermetal.de	7.5/10 stars
Sputnikmusic	3/5 stars
Metalholic	7.8/10 stars

Gaia's Legacy is the eighth album by Italian progressive metal band Eldritch, released in 2011.

== Track listing ==
1. "Gaia's Anger" (intro) - 1:00
2. "Deviation" - 4:40
3. "Our Land" - 4:47
4. "Vortex of Disasters" - 4:54
5. "Mother earth" - 4:48
6. "Everything's burning" - 4:01
7. "Thinning out" - 5:20
8. "Like a Child" - 5:20
9. "Signs" - 5:49
10. "Thoughts of grey" - 5:37
11. "Thirst in our hands (Dry tears)" - 5:49
12. "Through Different Eyes (Fates Warning cover)" - 4:25
