= Ancient Spirit Rising =

Studio album by Domine
- Released: 12/2/2007
- Recorded: January 2007
- Genre: Power metal
- Length: 61:53
- Label: Dragonheart, Avalon
- Producer: Enrico Paoli

Ancient Spirit Rising is the fifth album by Domine. It was recorded in January 2007 and released under Japanese label Avalon in February 2007.

== Track listing ==
All tracks by Enrico Paoli except where noted.

1. "The Messenger" – 6:24
2. "Tempest Calling" – 5:59
3. "The Lady of Shalott" – 9:14
4. "Stand Alone (After the Fall)" – 4:28
5. "Ancient Spirit Rising" – 9:22
6. "On the Wings of the Firebird" – 6:32
7. "Another Time, Another Place, Another Space" (Riccardo Iacono, Paoli) – 7:10
8. "Sky Rider" – 4:56
9. "How the Mighty Have Fallen" – 7:42

== Personnel ==
- Morby – vocals
- Enrico Paoli – guitars
- Riccardo Paoli – bass
- Riccardo Iacono – keyboards
- Stefano Bonini – drums
