= Seeds of Rage =

Seeds Of Rage

Studio album by Eldritch
- Released: October 1995
- Recorded: September 1995
- Genre: Progressive metal
- Length: 51:26
- Label: Inside Out

Eldritch chronology
Seeds Of Rage (1995)	Headquake (1997)

Seeds of Rage is the first album by Italian progressive metal band Eldritch, released in 1995. This work is dedicated to the memory of Fabio and Roberto Cappanera.

== Reception ==
Rock Hard rated the album rather highly, 8.5 points out of 10. Norway's Scream Magazine also gave it a high score, 5 out of 6. The magazine's chief editor Frode Øien, who was the reviewer, found the first impression a bit off, but became fonder of the album with more listens. Øien called Eldritch "the best rock export of the football country". Eldritch were like a heavier Dream Theater.

Vampster also noted Dream Theater influences and "a singer who sounds like Bruce Dickinson's defiant little brother". Eldritch however set themselves apart from contemporary progressive metal bands with "catchy choruses", while not being "as polished and commercially driven as Images and Words". At times, Eldritch showed their "penchant for speed metal"; other times there were "some worthwhile quieter moments". The instrumentation was good, spearheaded by the "keyboard wizard Oleg Smirnoff" who was "breathtaking". Powermetal.de reckoned that the main influence was Fates Warning, while Eldritch also "display very distinctive characteristics, such as the 70s-style synths, or the piano and acoustic guitars that build tension before the electric guitars kick in". Both Vampster and Powermetal.de found the production a bit suboptimal.

Seeds of Rage was re-released in 2006 with bonus material.

== Track listing ==
1. "Incurably Ill" - 6:45
2. "Under This Ground" - 5:00
3. "Chains" - 5:14
4. "Cage of Sins" - 4:55
5. "Colors" - 6:21
6. "The Deaf and the Blind" - 4:03
7. "Ultimate Solution" - 5:22
8. "I Don't Know Why" - 4:45
9. "Chalice of Insanity" - 3:41
10. "Blind Promise" - 5:19
