= Stormbringer Ruler =

Studio album by Domine
- Released: 24 October 2001
- Recorded: April 2001
- Studio: New Sin Audio Design, Loria, Treviso, Italy
- Genre: Power metal
- Length: 58:06
- Label: Dragonheart Records; Avalon
- Producer: Enrico Paoli

Stormbringer Ruler is the third album released in 2001 by Italian epic metal band Domine. It is the third and final chapter of the story of Elric of Melniboné.

== Track listing ==
1. "The Legend of the Power Supreme" – 1:31
2. "The Hurricane Master" – 4:32
3. "Horn of Fate (The Chronicles of the Black Sword - The End of an Era Pt.2)" – 7:33
4. "The Ride of the Valkyries" – 7:15
5. "True Leader of Men" – 6:19
6. "Bearer of the Black Sword (The Chronicles of the Black Sword - The End of an Era Pt.1)" – 7:21
7. "The Fall of the Spiral Tower" – 6:15
8. "For Evermore (The Chronicles of the Black Sword - The End of an Era Pt.3)" – 6:24
9. "Dawn of a New Day - A Celtic Requiem (The Chronicles of the Black Sword - The End of an Era Pt.4)" – 10:59

The Japanese version includes the bonus track: 10. Stargazer (Rainbow cover) – 8:18

== Personnel ==
=== Band members ===
- Enrico Paoli – guitars
- Morby – vocals
- Riccardo Paoli – bass
- Riccardo Iacono – keyboards
- Stefano Bonini – drums

=== Guests ===
- Leanan Sidhe – vocals
- Danie Powers – narration
