= Portrait of the Abyss Within =

Italian metal album

Portrait of The Abyss Within

Studio album by Eldritch
- Released: May 24, 2004
- Recorded: Big Wave Recording Studios, November–December 2003
- Genre: Progressive metal
- Length: 49:11
- Label: Limb Music

Eldritch chronology
Reverse (2001)	Portrait of The Abyss Within (2004)	Neighbourhell (2006)

Professional ratings
Review scores
Source	Rating
Rock Hard	7.5/10 stars
Blabbermouth	5.5/10 stars
DPRP	7.5/10 stars
Scream Magazine	4/6 stars
Powermetal.de	
Vampster	

Portrait of the Abyss Within is the fifth album by progressive metal band Eldritch, released in 2004. It is the first album without keyboards, except for the bonus track "Quiet Hope".

== Track listing ==
1. "Muddy Clepsidra" – 1:05
2. "Forbidden" – 6:43
3. "The World Apart – 4:15
4. "This Everlasting Mind Disease" – 4:30
5. "Picture on The Wall" – 2:35
6. "Dice Rolling" – 5:52
7. "Drowning" – 3:51
8. "Blindfolded Walkthrough" – 6:18
9. "See You Down" – 5:06
10. "Slow Motion K Us" – 4:08
11. "Lonesome Existence" – 4:44
