= Reverse (Eldritch album) =

Studio album by Eldritch
- Released: September 30, 2001
- Recorded: February–April 2001
- Studio: New Sin Studios
- Genre: Progressive metal
- Length: 48:48
- Label: Pick Up Records

Eldritch chronology
| El Niño (1998) | Reverse (2001) | Portrait of the Abyss Within (2004) |

Professional ratings
Review scores
| Source | Rating |
|---|---|
| Rock Hard | 8.5/10 stars |
| Metal.de | 7/10 stars |
| Powermetal.de | |
| Vampster | |
| Sputnikmusic | 4/5 stars |

Reverse is the fourth album of the progressive metal band Eldritch, containing a cover of "My Sharona".

== Track listing ==
1. "E-Nest" (intro) - 1:10
2. "Reverse" - 5:07
3. "Slavery On Line" - 5:17
4. "Leftovers and Crumb" - 4:32
5. "Bittersweet Penny" - 4:28
6. "Bio-Trinity" - 5:51
7. "Suffering Degree" - 4:31
8. "My Sharona" (The Knack cover) - 3:10
9. "Soul Shrinkage" - 4:02
10. "Leech" - 4:30
11. "Little Irwin" - 6:10
