= Eldritch (band) =

Italian progressive metal band

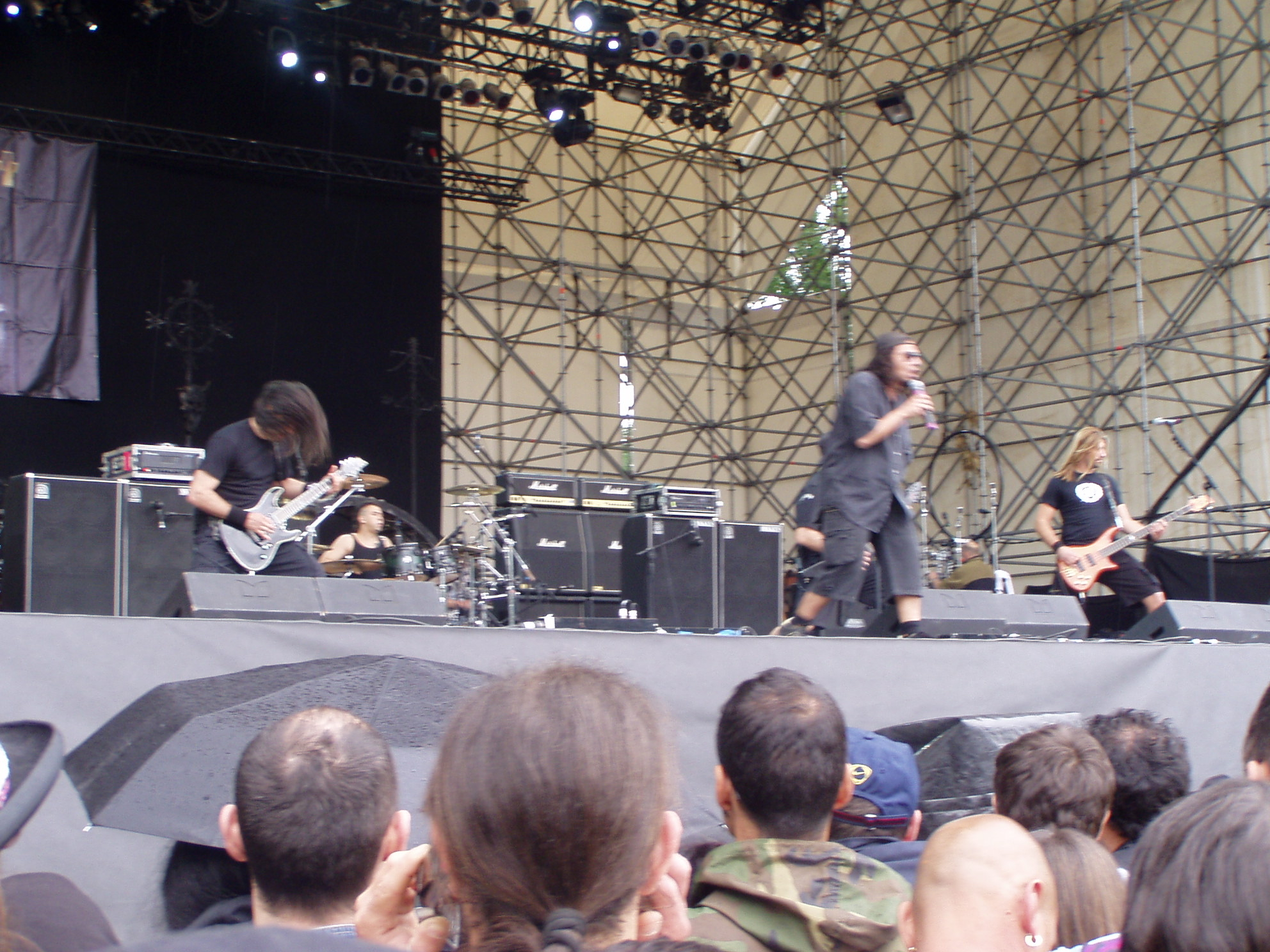
- Eldritch playing at Gods of Metal 2007

Background information
- Origin: Livorno, Tuscany, Italy
- Genres: Progressive metal
- Years active: 1991-present
- Labels: Inside Out Music; Limb Music; Scarlet Records
- Members: Alex Jarusso; Eugene Simone; Rudj Ginanneschi; Dario Lastrucci; Raffahell Dridge; Oleg Smirnoff
- Website: eldritchweb.com

Eldritch is a progressive metal band formed in 1991 in Italy.

== History ==
Their history began when Eugene Simone, Adriano Dal Canto, and Terence Holler formed a band with the intent of putting out some demos. Right after the lineup was complete and the demos started to spread over the scene, the interest towards the band began to grow until Limp Schoor, in 1993 accepted to be their manager.

In 1995 the band put out the debut album Seeds of Rage for Inside Out Music label. The album had good success, winning an award as Album of the Month on the German magazine Heavy, oder was!?. Two years later, in 1997, the band proceeded to follow the same flow in terms of musical ideals, to the point where they published Headquake, having success again, and at the time the Organization of the Gods of Metal Festival was convinced to include them in the bill.

1998 was the year of a change in style. With the publishing of El Niño the band followed influences such as Metallica, Coroner, and Annihilator. The crowd and the media appreciated very much their change as their albums selling grew and a tour with Threshold and Pain Of Salvation came.

Also in 1998, the lineup changed. In the new lineup the band faced many difficulties, and within 3 years, in 2001 they published Reverse, an album which marked a new turn to the band's style and composition ideas. they approached more complex riffs, with the influence of bands such as Machine Head and Pantera. That year they participated again to the Gods Of Metal Festival.

The following album was published 3 years later. After changing lineup again, they changed label too this time, signing with Limb Music, and Portrait of the Abyss Within was put out in 2004. In 2006 Eldritch published Neighbourhell.

After putting out the album Blackenday, the Leghorn band intent was to work on another album, which, as they declare, it will be even more complex and technically challenging than their previous albums.

== Members ==
=== Current ===
- Eugene Simone – guitar (1991–present)
- Oleg Smirnoff – keyboards (1991–1999, 2019–present)
- Raffahell Dridge – drums (2007–present)
- Rudj Ginanneschi – guitar (2010–present)
- Dario Lastrucci – bass (2019–present)
- Alex Jarusso – vocals (2023–present)

=== Former ===
- Terence Holler – vocals (1991–2022)
- Martin Kyhn – bass (1991–2004)
- Adriano Dal Canto – drums (1991–1999)
- Dave Simeone – drums (2000–2007)
- Sean Henderson – keyboards (2000–2004)
- Lisa Oliviero – bass (2004–2005)
- Roberto "Peck" Proietti – guitars (2004–2010)
- John Crystal – bass (2005–2014)
- Gabriele Caselli – keyboards (2010–2015)
- Alessio Consani – bass (2014–2019)

Timeline

== Discography ==
=== Demos ===
- 1991 – Reflection of Sadness Demo
- 1993 – Promo Tracks 1993 Demo

=== Studio albums ===
- 1995 – Seeds of Rage
- 1997 – Headquake
- 1998 – El Niño
- 2001 – Reverse
- 2004 – Portrait of the Abyss Within
- 2006 – Neighbourhell
- 2007 – Blackenday
- 2011 – Gaia's Legacy
- 2014 – Tasting the tears
- 2015 – Underlying Issues
- 2018 – Cracksleep
- 2021 – Eos
- 2023 – Innervoid

=== Live albums ===
- 2008 – Livequake

== Music videos ==
- "Reverse" – 2001
- "My Sharona" (cover) – 2001
- "Lonesome Existence" – 2005
- "Save Me" – 2006
- "The Blackened Day" – 2007
- "Everything's Burning" – 2011
- "Deviation" – 2012
- "Alone again" – 2014
