= Cracksleep =

Studio album by Eldritch
- Released: 23 March 2018
- Genre: Progressive metal
- Length: 51:59
- Label: Scarlet Records

Eldritch chronology
Underlying Issues (2015)	Cracksleep (2018)	Eos (2021)

Cracksleep is the eleventh full-length album by Eldritch, released in 2018 on Scarlet Records.

It is a concept album about sleep, coma and related themes.

== Reception ==
Powermetal.de counted the album as typical for Eldritch's common style of melodic progressive metal, less heavy than their previous output. The musicians had abundant skills and the songwriting held a high international standard. The reviewer particularly recommended "Aberration of Nature", arguing that "You can't play melodic progressive power metal any better than this. Even bands like Angra or Evergrey have to acknowledge that". Though there were "simply no weak points to be found here", the rating was 8 out of 10. The presence of "a real smash hit" would have increased the score.

Rock Hard gave the same rating, and other outlets echoed it with similar scores such as 4/5 or 8.5/10. Metal Hammer Italia gave 78 %.

Metal.de gave a slightly lower score, 7, though recommending the album to "any fan of thrash and power metal with progressive influences", as Eldritch filled their progressive metal with more overt power metal elements. "The focus is on numerous guitar solos, the liberal use of keyboards, and yearning choruses [...] with melancholic lyrics". The tone of the album was a bit dark, making it "a perfect soundtrack for days when things aren't going quite as smoothly as usual".

Heavymetal.dk could not bestow more than 5 points to Cracksleep. Quipped the reviewer, "Cracksleep is about sleep, dreams, coma and death, which turns out to be quite fitting; one must be a real hardcore Eldritch fan to not sit and yawn a couple of times during the album's runtime of about 52 minutes". The reviewer found the album "ass-hammeringly boring". The lyrics were "embarrassing", and "would make Taylor Swift look like Shakespeare" in comparison. Lastly, the pompous and bombastic sound with strings, keyboard and "(over)dramatic" guitar leads made the music unenjoyable, despite the performers being skilled musicians.

== Track listing ==
1. "Cracksleep" – 1:50
2. "Reset" – 5:33
3. "Deep Frost" – 5:27
4. "Aberration of Nature" – 5:33
5. "My Breath" – 5:40
6. "Silent Corner" – 4:18
7. "As the Night Crawls In" – 5:12
8. "Voices Calling" – 4:24
9. "Staring at the Ceiling" – 4:50
10. "Night Feelings" – 4:25
11. "Hidden Friend" – 4:47
