= Domine (band) =

Italian power metal band

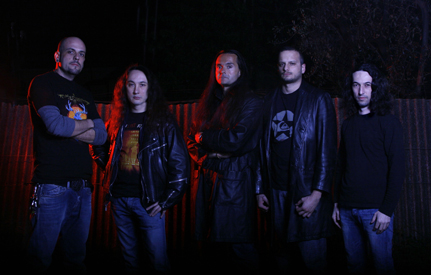

Background information
- Origin: Florence, Italy
- Genres: Power metal
- Years active: 1984–present
- Labels: Dragonheart, Avalon
- Members: Morby; Enrico Paoli; Riccardo Paoli; Stefano Bonini; Riccardo Iacono
- Past members: Agostino Carpo; Carlo "Funa" Funaioli; Mimmo Palmiotta
- Website: dominetruemetal.com

Domine is an Italian power metal band formed in 1983 by brothers Enrico and Riccardo Paoli. The group from Florence, who began releasing demo tapes in 1986, got some attention with their first album, Champion Eternal, released in 1997. Domine went on to release four more albums, touring Europe and playing at many festivals. They have been linked to heroic fantasy and sword and sorcery writers like Michael Moorcock and Robert E. Howard for their lyrics related to the Elric of Melniboné and Conan the Barbarian novels.

== History ==
=== Champion Eternal ===
Champion Eternal was the starting point of a new life for the band, after many years in the underground scene. The band had been in existence for some time when the debut album was released, by Italian label Dragonheart, having previously recorded four demo tapes (from 1986 to 1994) getting reviews and interviews in a lot of fanzines and magazines around the world. However, the line-up of the band changed just before the CD was released. The new line-up of the group was Enrico Paoli on guitars, Riccardo Paoli on bass (the only ones left of the original line-up), Mimmo Palmiotta on drums (previously with Masterstroke and Death SS) and Morby on vocals (ex-Sabotage, one of the first metal bands in Italy).

The band has been compared by magazines and fanzines to Manowar, Queensrÿche, Warlord, Omen, Helstar, Candlemass, and Iron Maiden. The band established its personal style with songs like "Stormbringer (The Black Sword)" and "Army of The Dead", and power metal assaults like "The Mass Of Chaos" and "The Midnight Meat Train". Some of the songs have progressive structures like the title track, "The Eternal Champion", a 12 minutes long suite divided in seven parts.

In 1998, keyboards player Riccardo Iacono entered the band and singer Morby sang in Labyrinth during their European tour with HammerFall.

=== Dragonlord ===
Dragonlord (Tales of the Noble Steel) is the band's second album and the most successful in terms of sales. All the songs on the album were written from July to December 1998, except for three tracks written for demo tapes and redone for the album at the request of the fans of the demo tapes. A few songs on "Champion Eternal" had some keyboard parts but with the joining of the fifth member, keyboards are used more and more to add atmosphere to the songs. The band spent the beginning of 1999 to pre-produce the songs and entered the studio in May.

Soon after the recording of the album, drummer Mimmo quit musical activities to dedicate his time to his family. The new drummer is Stefano Bonini, previously with extreme act Necromass, with whom he recorded two albums and toured Europe with Dark Funeral. After the release of the album, the band began playing live concerts, starting in Athens, Greece, then a European tour opening for American bands Riot, Anvil and Agent Steel.

Domine played at the Powermad 2000 Festival with Running Wild, Grave Digger and Moon Of Steel.

=== Stormbringer Ruler ===
The new album Stormbringer Ruler – The Legend of the Power Supreme was recorded during April 2001 at the New Sin Audio Design in Loria (TV).

Stormbringer Ruler includes the songs "Horn of Fate", "The Bearer Of The Black Sword", "For Evermore" and "Dawn of A New Day" which are parts of a mini-concept entitled "The Chronicles of the Black Sword – The End on an Era" inspired by the final part of the saga of Elric of Melniboné, and tells the story of the final destiny of science fiction/fantasy author Michael Moorcock's character Elric of Melniboné, Dragonlord and Ruler of the Black Sword Stormbringer. In the milieu in which several series of Moorcock's novels are set, Elric is one of the many incarnations of the Eternal Champion, an immortal being doomed to reincarnate in many heroes and to fight forever. The destiny of the incarnation called Elric is to be the herald of the final battle between Chaos and Law for the Earth.

"The Ride of the Valkyries" is a tribute to Richard Wagner and to his operas inspired by northern mythology. The song features the theme of the opera "Die Walküre" from the "Der Ring des Nibelungen".

"For Evermore" alludes to Queen's songs "Nevermore" and "Seven Seas of Rhye" from the album Queen II as well as "Lily of the Valley" from Sheer Heart Attack; compare, "The King of Rhye will be crowned again / His messenger will spread the word far through the land / He will sail the seven seas of his kingdom" ("For Evermore") with, "Messenger from Seven Seas has flown / To tell the King of Rhye he's lost his throne" ("Lily of the Valley").

=== Emperor of the Black Runes ===
Domine created its fourth album Emperor of the Black Runes with the New Sin Audio Design studio in May 2003, after some months of writing and pre-production. The "Aquilonia Suite", a track with excerpts from "Conan the Barbarian" soundtrack, gets an enthusiastic response from the amazing composer Basil Poledouris, and other songs hark to Jethro Tull's style or refer back to Moorcock's other works.

=== Ancient Spirit Rising ===
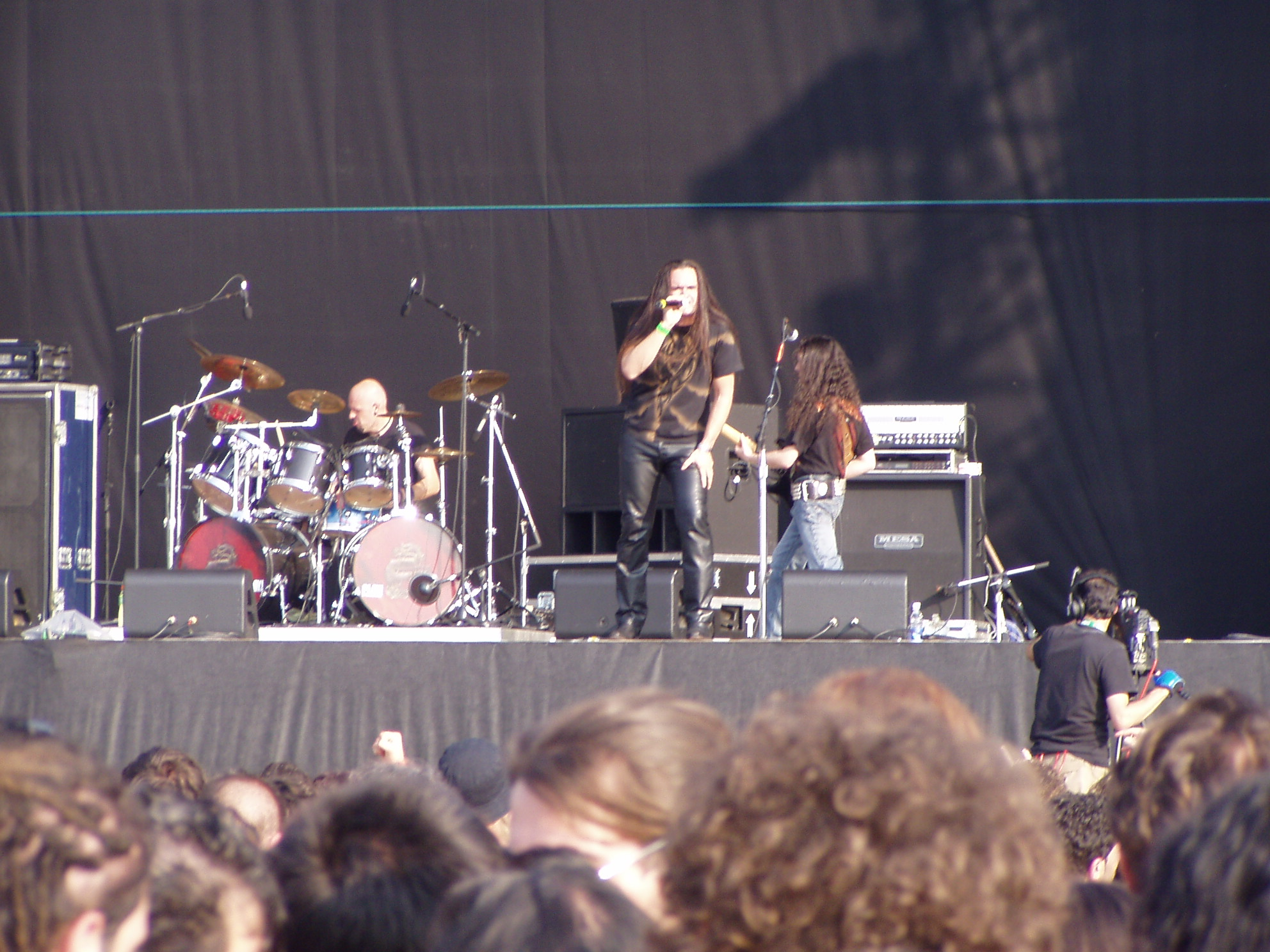
Domine performing in 2007

Domine's fifth studio album, Ancient Spirit Rising, was released in 2007. The album contains references to classical music, progressive influences and country-flavored ballads. After this album was recorded the band resumed live gigs. In March 2008, keyboard player Riccardo Iacono left the band for personal reasons. The new member is Gabriele Caselli, who debuted with Domine at the Agglutination Festival in 2008.

== Members ==
=== Current members ===
- Morby (Adolfo Morviducci) – vocals (1997–present)
- Enrico Paoli – guitar (1983–present)
- Riccardo Paoli – bass (1983–present)
- Riccardo Iacono – keyboards (1998–2008, 2010–present)
- Stefano Bonini – drums (1999–present)

=== Past members ===
- Stefano Mazzella – vocals (1983–1992)
- Agostino Carpo – guitars (1983–1993)
- Carlo Funaioli – drums (1983–1997)
- Simone Gazzola – vocals (1992–1997)
- Mimmo Palmiotta – drums (1997–1999)
- Gabriele Caselli – keyboards (2008–2010)

Timeline

== Discography ==
- Champion Eternal (1997)
- Dragonlord (1999)
- Stormbringer Ruler (2002)
- Emperor of the Black Runes (2004)
- Ancient Spirit Rising (2007)
