= Inchiuvatu =

Italian symphonic black metal band

Background information
- Origin: Sciacca, Italy
- Genres: Symphonic black metal, folk metal
- Years active: 1992–present
- Labels: Inch Productions; Audioglobe
- Members: Agghiastru; Live: Agghiastru; Franco Barbata "Tati" Natascia

Inchiuvatu (Sicilian: Nailed) is a Sicilian musical group that combines symphonic black metal with Sicilian folk melodies. They use the fiscalettu (a traditional Sicilian flute) and the piano.

Almost all lyrics are in Sicilian, except for occasional incursions in English and Italian. The sound of Inchiuvatu is compared to black metal bands like Emperor or Dimmu Borgir, but with a link to Sicilian traditions.

The lyrics deal with sex, Christianity, anti-Christianity, and existential drama, summarized as "Drama-Sex-Christ".

The band name expresses the inability of man to answer existential questions like the meaning of life.

== Releases ==
- TrinaKa ["Trinacria" was the ancient name of Sicily and today is the name of its symbol] (EP, 1993)
- Strurusia ["Mischievousness"] (EP, 1994)
- Demoniu ["Demon"] (EP, 1994)
- Venniri Santu ["Holy Friday"] (Live EP, 1994)
- Inchiuvatu ["Nailed"] (Demo album, 1995)
- Addisiu ["Desire"] (Album, 1996)
- Viogna ["Shame"] (Album, 2000)
- Piccatu ["Sin"] (Album, 2004)
- Miseria ["Misery"] (Album, 2008)
- 33 (EP, 2008)
- Ecce Homo ["Behold the Man"] (EP, 2011)
- INRI (EP, 2013)
- Via Matris (EP,2014)
- Via Lucis (EP, 2017)
