= El Niño (Eldritch album) =

Studio album by Eldritch
- Released: November 20, 1998
- Recorded: April–May 1998
- Genre: Progressive metal
- Length: 52:44
- Label: Inside Out

Eldritch chronology
Headquake (1997)	El Niño (1998)	Reverse (2001)

El Nino is the third studio album by progressive metal band Eldritch, which was released in 1998.

Norway's Scream Magazine found there to be no weak songs on the album, with great variation and balance between melodic and progressive elements. The reviewer gave a 5 out of 6 score, though it was close to the very top rating.

== Track listing ==
1. "Fall from Grace" – 2:06
2. "No Direction Home" – 7:04
3. "Heretic Beholder" – 5:04
4. "Scar" – 4:25
5. "Bleed Mask Bleed" – 4:37
6. "The Last Days of the Year" – 4:31
7. "From Dusk till Dawn" – 5:37
8. "To Be or Not to Be (God)" – 7:14
9. "El Nino" – 5:35
10. "Nebula Surface" – 6:05 (bonus track)
