= Cesare Bonizzi =

Italian Capuchin friar and musical artist (1946–2024)

The Reverend Cesare Bonizzi OFM Cap.
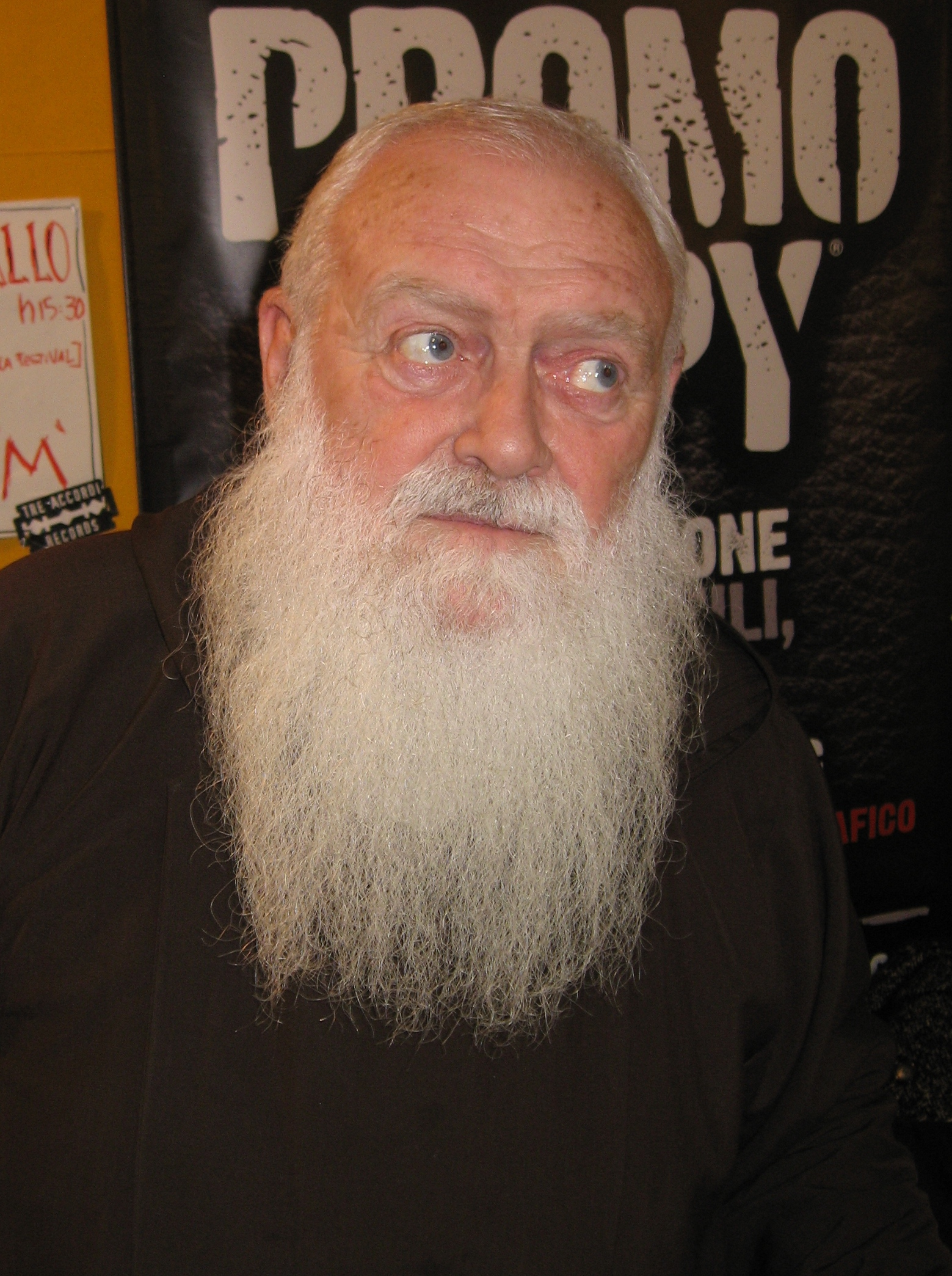
- Bonizzi in 2008

Background information
- Also known as: Frate Cesare; Fratello Metallo
- Born: 15 March 1946; Offanengo, Cremona, Italy
- Died: 19 November 2024 (aged 78)
- Genres: Heavy metal, hard rock, Christian metal
- Occupations: Friar and religious priest, musician, singer-songwriter
- Instrument: Vocals
- Years active: 1990–2009
- Website: FrateCesare.com

Cesare Bonizzi, OFMCap (15 March 1946 – 19 November 2024), also known as "Frate Cesare" and colloquially as "Fratello Metallo" ("Brother Metal"), (Note: "Fratello Metallo" is the name that Frate Cesare gave to heavy metal, not to himself, but he came to be referred to by that name.) was an Italian Capuchin friar and heavy metal singer.

== Biography ==
Bonizzi was born in Offanengo, in the Province of Cremona, Italy. He entered the Capuchin Order in 1975, and subsequently carried out missionary work in the Ivory Coast. After returning to Italy, he was ordained a priest in 1983. From 1990 on he was interested in using music as a means of contemplation and spiritual devotion, and he released numerous albums in various styles from new age to rock. After seeing Metallica in concert, however, he became passionate about heavy metal as a musical vehicle. According to him, "Metal is the most energetic, vital, deep and true musical language that I know." At the time of his death in 2024 he lived in the convent of Frati Minori di Bergamo. In late 2009, he announced that he would no longer perform, because "The devil has separated me from my managers, risked making me break up with my band colleagues and also risked making me break up with my fellow monks. He lifted me up to the point where I become a celebrity and now I want to kill him."

Bonizzi died on 19 November 2024, at the age of 78.

== Music ==
Although Bonizzi's full transformation to heavy metal is only found on Fratello Metallo's 2008 release Misteri, Bonizzi recorded numerous albums in various musical genres. With his new style of music, which he termed "Metrock" as a combination of metal and rock, he was the opening act at 2008's Gods of Metal, Italy's largest heavy metal festival. Bonizzi performed in full Franciscan habit.

== Discography ==
- Droghe
- Primi Passi
- L'Eucredo
- Il La Cristiano
- Straordinariamente Ovvio
- Maria Ed "Io"
- Come Fiamma
- Vie Crucis
- Fede Ballare
- Assisi Oggi
- Misteri
