= Luigi Cappanera =

Italian retired footballer

Luigi Cappanera (born 6 February 1947 in Genoa) is an Italian retired footballer. He played as a midfielder. He played for Sampdoria youth teams. In 1968, he was loaned to Lecce and he remained there for two years, then he was loaned again to Savona and Spezia. In 1972-1973 he remained at Sampdoria and played one Serie A match against Napoli. He then played in Serie C for Grosseto and Pisa.

== Career ==
- 1966-1968 Sampdoria 0 (0)
- 1968-1970 → Lecce 47 (1)
- 1970-1971 → Savona 17 (0)
- 1971-1972 → Spezia 36 (2)
- 1972-1973 Sampdoria 1 (0)
- 1973-1975 Grosseto 72 (1)
- 1975-1977 Pisa 48 (2)

== See also ==
- Football in Italy
- List of football clubs in Italy
