= Arena Parco Nord =

Natural amphitheatre in Bologna, Italy

Coordinates: 44°31′30.6″N 11°22′1.9″E

Arena Joe Strummer, usually called Arena Parco Nord is a natural amphitheatre located in Bologna, Italy. It is used primarily for open-air concerts. The amphitheatre has served as the venue for the Independent Days Festival since 1999. It also hosted part of the European Monsters of Rock tour in 1990.

From January 2023, the Venue is managed by BolognaFiere Spa. Its capacity reached 30,000 persons, and it is well served by local transports and easily connects to the main highways and motorways. It hosted, from the 1987, the main artists worldwide.
