= White Skull =

Italian power metal band

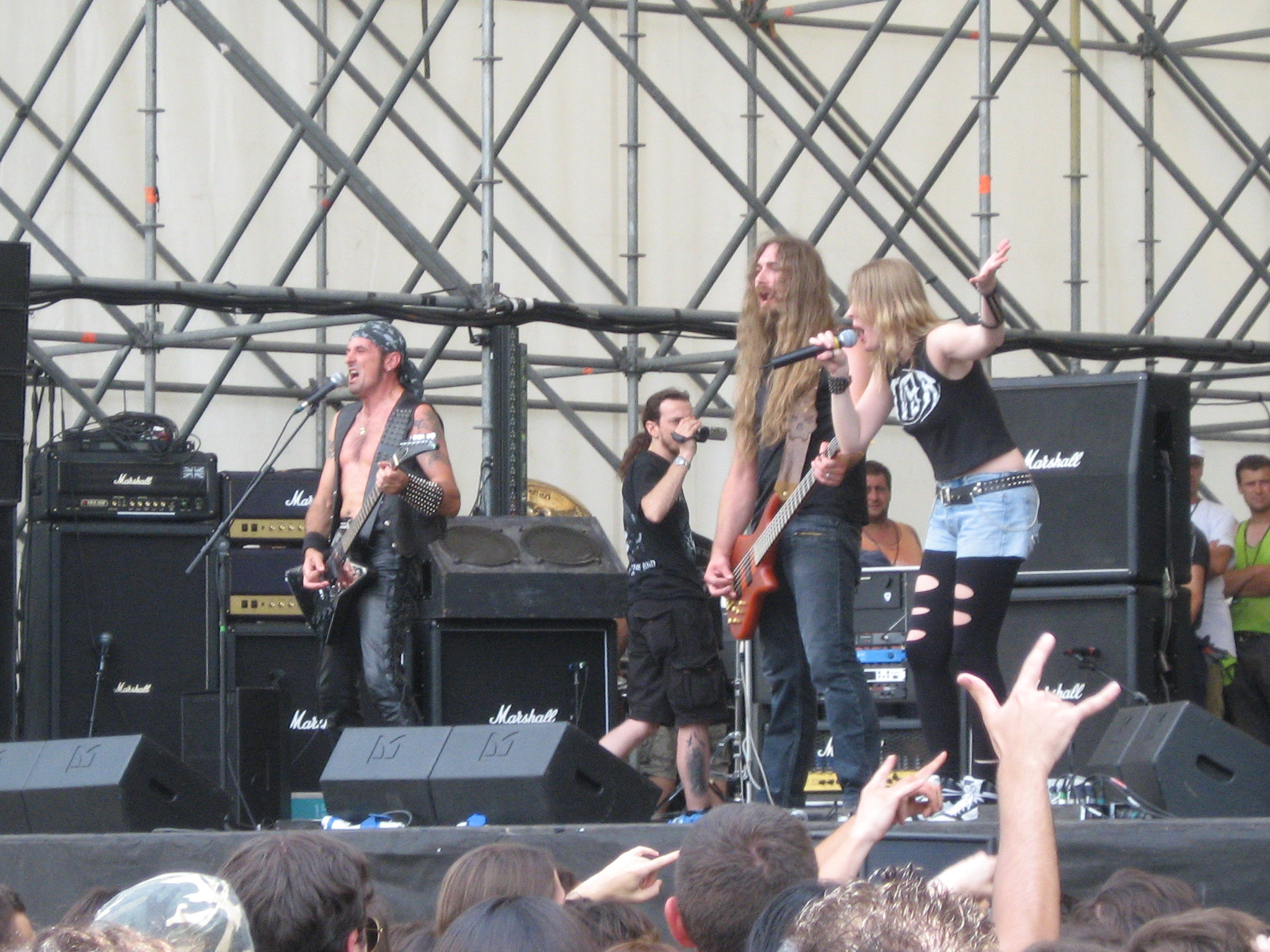
- White Skull performing in Milan in 2008

Background information
- Origin: Vicenza, Veneto, Italy
- Genres: Power metal, heavy metal
- Years active: 1988–present
- Label: Dragonheart Records
- Members: Tony "Mad" Fontò; Alex Mantiero; Federica "Sister" de Boni; Jo Raddi; Danilo Bar
- Past members: Gustavo "Gus" Gabarrò; Nick Savio; Fabio Pozzato; Fabio Manfroi; Elisa "Over" De Palma; Steve Balocco; Alessio Lucatti

White Skull is an Italian power/heavy metal band formed in 1988. They became known in the US with their 1999 release Tales from the North.

== Band members ==
The line-up of the band did not change until 1998 when Nick Savio replaced Max Faccio. In 2001, female lead singer Federica de Boni left the band and was replaced by a male lead singer Gustavo Gabarro. Two years later, Fabio Pozzato and Massimo Faccio left the band as well. In 2007, Elisa de Palma became the new singer, with the band becoming female-fronted once again. In 2010, de Boni rejoined the band.

Current members

- Tony "Mad" Fontó – rhythm guitar (1988–present)
- Alex Mantiero – drums (1988–present)
- Federica "Sister" de Boni – lead vocals (1988–2001, 2010–present)
- Valentino Francavilla – lead guitar (2019–present)
- Gio Raddi – bass (2007–present)
- Alessandro Muscio – keyboards (2016-present)

Former members

- Fabio Pozzato – bass (1988–2003)
- Nick Savio – lead guitar (1998–2003)
- Massimo "Max" Faccio – lead guitar (1988–1998)
- Gustavo "Gus" Gabarro – lead vocals (2001–2007)
- Stefano "Steve Bone" Balocco – bass (2003–2007)
- Elisa "Over" de Palma – lead vocals (2007–2010)
- Alessio "Tom" Lucatti – keyboards (2007–2010)
- Danilo Bar – guitar (2003–2019)
- Alessandro “Alex” Trevisan - keyboards (1988-2007)

== Discography ==
=== Albums ===
- 1995 – I Won't Burn Alone
- 1997 – Embittered
- 1999 – Tales from the North
- 2000 – Public Glory, Secret Agony
- 2002 – The Dark Age
- 2004 – The XIII Skull
- 2006 – The Ring of the Ancients
- 2009 – Forever Fight
- 2012 – Under This Flag
- 2017 – Will of the Strong
- 2022 – Metal Never Rusts

=== EP ===
- 1999 – Asgard

=== Demo ===
- 1991 – White Skull
- 1992 – Save the Planet
