= Stormlord (band) =

Italian extreme metal band

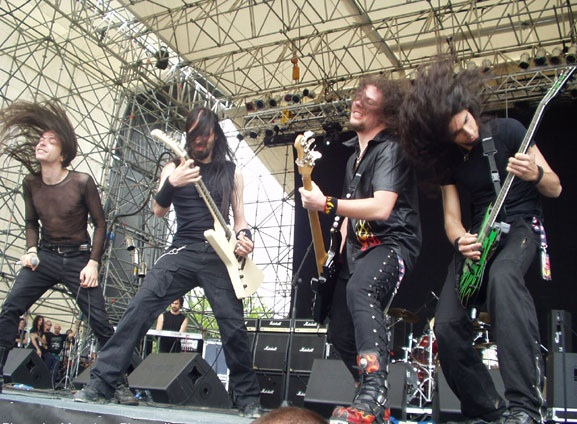
- Stormlord

Background information
- Origin: Rome, Italy
- Genres: Symphonic black metal, power metal, death metal (early)
- Years active: 1991–Present
- Labels: Locomotive Music, Scarlet
- Members: Cristiano Borchi; Andrea Angelini; Gianpaolo Caprino; Francesco Bucci; David Folchitto
- Website: stormlord.net

Stormlord is an extreme metal band from Rome, Italy. The self-described "extreme epic metal" band has released the albums Supreme Art of War (1999), At the Gates of Utopia (2001), The Gorgon Cult (2004), Mare Nostrum (2008), Hesperia (2013), and Far (2019). Their use of keyboards gives them a power metal sound.

Most of their songs revolve around Greek Mythology (Zeus, Hades, Persephone, Prometheus, Medusa, Titans), and battles. Vocalist Cristiano Borchi uses a high-pitched black metal shriek and a death metal growl for the choruses.

== Members ==
=== Current members ===
- Cristiano Borchi - vocals (1991-present), bass (1991-1996)
- Francesco Bucci - bass (1997-present)
- David Folchitto - drums (1999-present)
- Gianpaolo Caprino - guitars, clean vocals, keyboards (2002-present)
- Andrea Angelini - guitars (2010-present)
- Riccardo Studer - keyboards (2011-present)

Session/live members:

- A. G. Volgar (Deviate Damaen) - opera vocals, narration (studio only)
- Elisabetta Marchetti - female vocals (live/studio since 2004 with "The Gorgon Cult")

=== Past members ===
- Pierangelo Giglioni - guitars (1997–2010)
- Claudio Di Carlo - guitars (1991–1994)
- Riccardo Montanari - drums (1991–1994)
- Andrea Cacciotti - guitars (1993–1995)
- Dario Maurizi - guitars (1995)
- Gabriele Valerio - drums (1995) (now in Theatres Des Vampires and Astarte Syriaca)
- Fabrizio Cariani - keyboards (1995–1999)
- Marcello Baragona - drums (1995–1999)
- Dux Tenebrarum - guitars (1997)
- Raffaella Grifoni - female vocals (1997)
- Malfeitor Fabban (Aborym)- bass (1997-1998)
- Simone Scazzocchio - keyboards
- Luca Bellanova - keyboards (live only)
- Maurizio Pariotti - keyboards (live only)

== Discography ==
=== Full lengths ===
- Supreme Art of War (1999)
- At the Gates of Utopia (2001)
- The Gorgon Cult (2004)
- Mare Nostrum (2008)
- Hesperia (2013)
- Far (2019)

=== EPs ===
- Under the Sign of the Sword (1997)
- Where My Spirit Forever Shall Be (1998)
- The Curse of Medusa (2001)

=== Demos ===
- Demo 1992 (1992)
- Black Knight (1993)
- Promo 1997 (1997)

=== DVDs ===
- The Battle of Quebec City: Live In Canada (2007)

=== Compilations ===
- The Legacy of Medusa – 17 Years of Extreme Epic Metal (2008)
