= Dark Lunacy =

Italian melodic death metal band

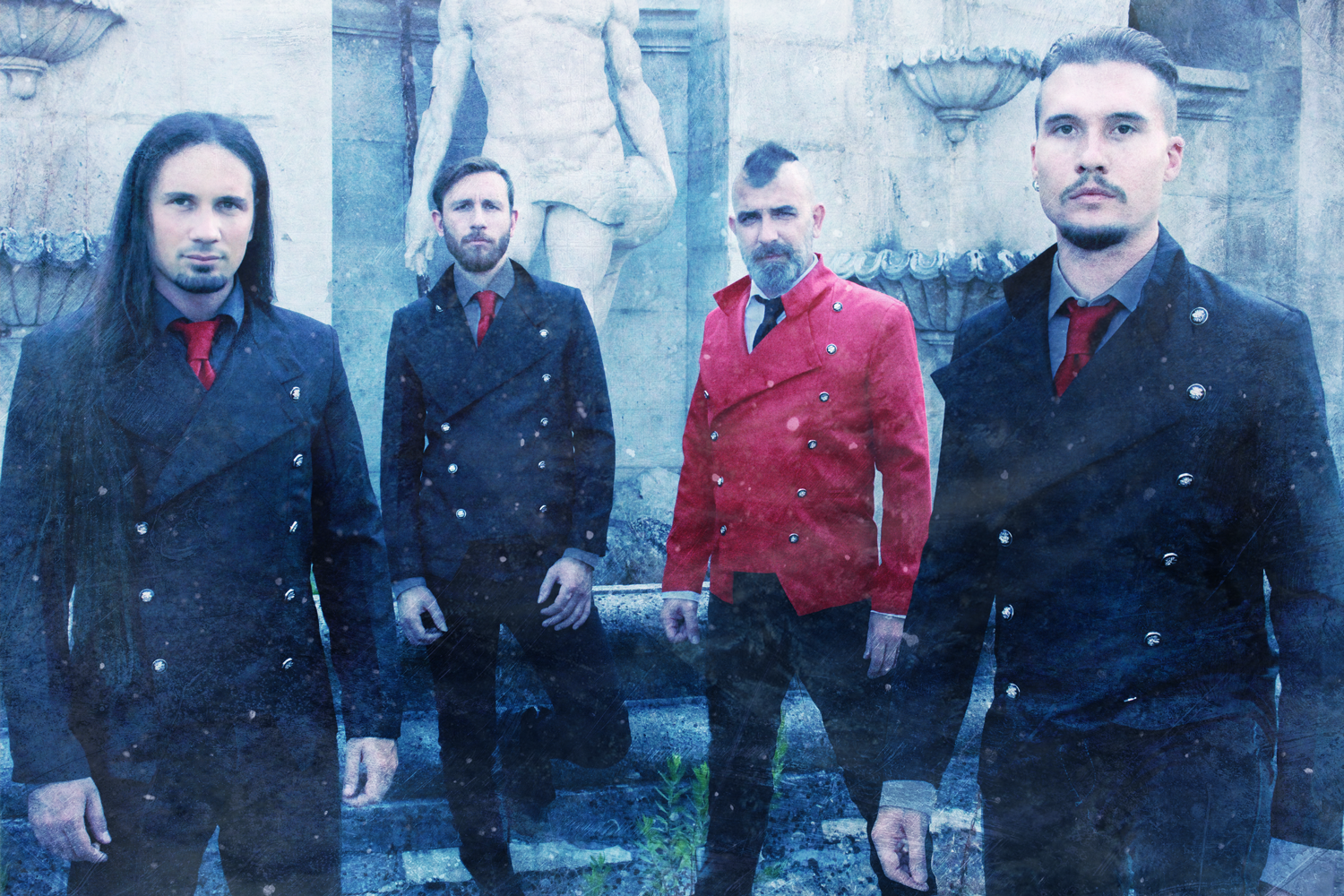
- Dark Lunacy in 2019

Background information
- Origin: Parma, Italy
- Genres: Melodic death metal, symphonic metal
- Years active: 1997–present
- Label: Fuel Records
- Members: Mike Lunacy; Jacopo Rossi; Davide Rinaldi; Marco Binda
- Website: darklunacy.com

Dark Lunacy is an Italian melodic death metal band with symphonic metal influences. Formed in Parma in 1997, the band has released six studio albums.

== History ==
=== From the beginnings (1997) to Devoid (2000) ===
The band formed in early 1997, when singer Mike and guitarist Enomys first met. Their first self-produced EP, Silent Storm (1998), was well received. Baijkal (drums) and Harpad (bass) completed the lineup. In the spring of 1999, the band released the four-track demo tape Serenity, in which the support of a real string quartet marked the future sound of Dark Lunacy. In 2000, the band signed to Fuel Records, which released the band first official album, Devoid, in November 2000. The band was critically acclaimed. Thanks to the singles "Dolls" and "Forlorn", Dark Lunacy entered the playlists of many radios and venues that aired metal music. In March 2001, the band started its first Italian tour, which ended on 12 May at Rolling Stone in Milan.

=== Forget Me Not (2002–2005) ===
After a split album with death metal band Infernal Poetry and a tour with Sadist and Deformachine in 2002, in June 2003, Dark Lunacy released its second album, Forget Me Not, which featured melodic parts guided by a more evident string quartet, and a more aggressive sound than in the past, thanks to the work of Imer and Baijkal. At the CD presentation at Transilvania in Milan, on 19 June 2003, followed a special broadcasting of the concert and interviews on RockTV.

=== The Diarist and lineup changes (2006 – early 2010) ===
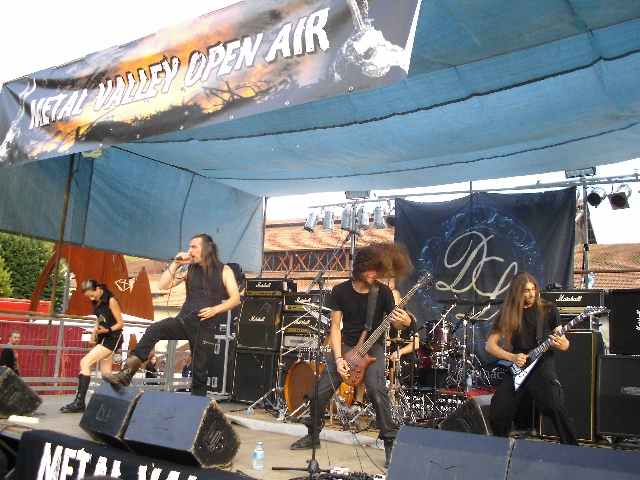
Dark Lunacy performing in 2009

In 2006, Baijkal and Imer left the band for personal issues, but not before releasing The Diarist, Dark Lunacy's third album. This record is a concept album that deals with the 900-days siege of Leningrad (St. Petersburg) during the Second World War. It is less orchestral than the previous release, and it shows artistic and technical maturity, combining powerful and sharp guitar riffs with melodies full of pathos, anger and solemnity. In the same year, Mary Ann and Mathias join the band, allowing it to go on with its live activity. In Fall 2007, Baijkal and Imer rejoined the band, while Mathias left and Mary Ann played the rhythm guitar. In 2009, Enomys left the band for personal issues. Shortly after, Simon officially joined the band as a guitarist. Another drastic revolution in the lineup occurred in 2010: Alessandro Vagnoni (drums) and Daniele Galassi (guitar) from Infernal Poetry joined the band, together with Claudio Cinquegrana (guitar) and Andy Marchini (bass), from Sadist.

=== Weaver of Forgotten (2010) ===
In June 2010, Mike announced on the band official website that the recording of their fourth album was on the way.

The album was released on 9 November 2010 via Fuel Records and it was distributed worldwide. Musically speaking, the record was different from the previous releases: it was darker, martial, slow and oppressive; it was also lacking of the Russian themes which marked the style of the band.

=== Live in Mexico City (2013) and The Day of Victory (2014) ===
With this renewed lineup, the band recorded in 2012 a live DVD in Mexico City and in the same year it set out a successful tour in Russia. After the release of the DVD, the band suffered once again from a lineup change. Andy Marchini – who was already replaced by Jacopo Rossi in some live gigs, the latter becoming an official member of the band – and Claudio Cinquegrana left and the band goes back to a quartet again, with Jacopo Rossi on bass. With these members, Dark Lunacy recorded the fifth album entitled The Day of Victory, a record that is thematically linked to the events of the Second World War in Russia.

In August 2015, the band goes on its first tour in Japan, playing in Tokyo, Osaka and Nagoya.

=== The Rain After the Snow (2016) ===
In the first months of 2016, on 14 March precisely, through the official Facebook page of the band, Mike Lunacy announces that Alessandro Vagnoni (drums) and Daniele Galassi (guitar) are no longer part of the band. From the words of the frontman it is clear that "discussion has begun last December, and each one of us has been pushing forward with his own ideas, and with a great emotional involvement. However, in the end, no unanimous solution has been found". However, further news come in May 2016, as it is announced that the writing of the new album has been completed. The new album is recorded in summer at Blackwave Studio in Genova, and it is released the following autumn.

In the meanwhile, the new lineup has its official debut at Basilica Metal Fest in Matera, on 16 July 2016: together with Mike Lunacy and Jacopo Rossi on stage there are Davide Rinaldi (guitar) and Marco Binda (drums), who both took part to the recordings of the new album, as they are official members of the band.

The Rain After the Snow, Dark Lunacy's next album, entirely composed and written by Jacopo Rossi, interpreted by Mike Lunacy, is released on 11 November 2016 via Fuel Records, the label which published also the previous albums of the band; it is also confirmed the collaboration between the band and the graphic designer and artist Gaspare Frazzitta, who designed the artwork and the booklet of the album and designed the previous ones "Weaver of Forgotten" and "The Day Of Victory".

As first single, it is released "Gold, Rubies and Diamonds", for which it was filmed a videoclip. In February 2017 a second video was released, "Howl". Then, a third video was added, a band playthrough of "Ab Umbra Lumen".

== Members ==
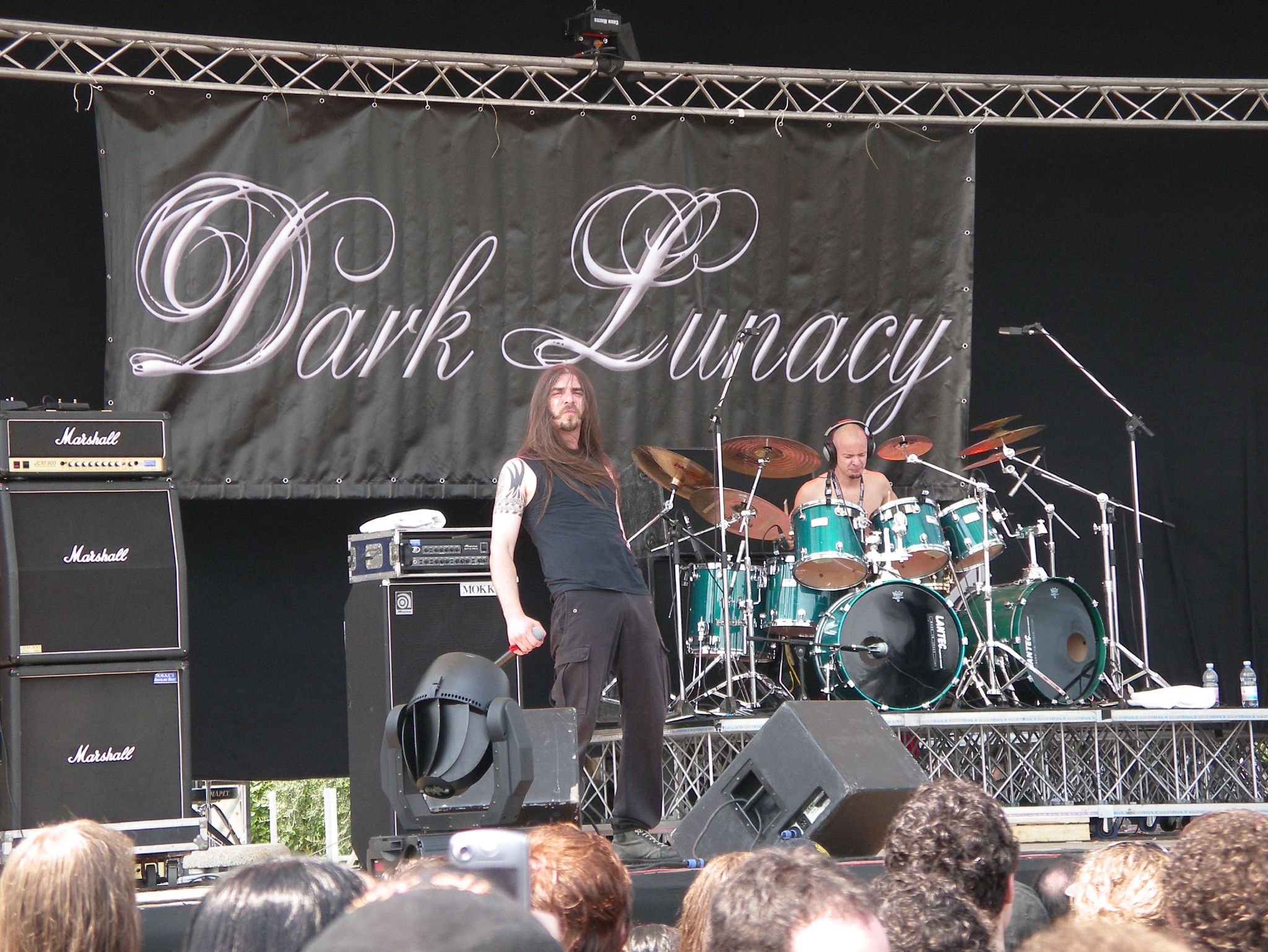
Dark Lunacy performing in 2005

Current

- Mike Lunacy – vocals
- Davide Rinaldi – guitar
- Jacopo Rossi – bass
- Marco Binda – drums

Former

- Daniele Galassi – guitar (2010–2016)
- Alessandro Vagnoni – drums (2010–2016)
- Claudio Cinquegrana – guitar (2010–2012)
- Andy Marchini – bass (2010–2012)
- Mary Ann – guitar (2006–2010)
- Simon – guitar (2009–2010)
- Enomys – guitar (1997–2008)
- Imer – bass (2001–2006, 2007–2010)
- Harpad – bass (1998–2001)
- Baijkal – drums (1998–2006, 2007–2010)
- Mathias – drums (2006–2007)
- Vault – drums (1998)

== Discography ==
Studio albums

- Devoid (2000)
- Forget Me Not (2003)
- The Diarist (2006)
- Weaver of Forgotten (2010)
- The Day of Victory (2014)
- The Rain After the Snow (2016)

Other releases

- Silent Storm (EP, 1998)
- Serenity (demo, 1999)
- Twice (split EP, 2002)
- Live in Mexico City (live album, 2012)
