= Terence Holler =

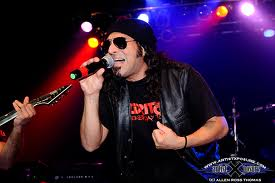
Terence Holler, 2012.

Terence Holler, real name Mario Tarantola is an Italian-American metal and rock singer. Best known for spending 31 years in the band Eldritch, with the solo project Holler he has released two albums on Scarlet Records.

== Personal life ==
Holler was born Mario Tarantola and was originally Italian-American. Outside of music, he has owned a steakhouse called La Porkeria. In 2024, a documentary about Terence Holler was released, directed by Alberto Bogo. In relation to that, Holler was described as a "controversial and charismatic figure, both beloved and controversial for his gruff demeanor and politically incorrect statements".

== Eldritch ==
Terence Holler was a founding member of Eldritch. After 31 years, he left the band in 2022.

== Holler ==
After leaving Eldritch, he founded a new band called Holler. Holler's music has been described as hard rock and adult-oriented rock (AOR), leaving metal behind.

In early 2024, the first album was released on Scarlet Records, called Reborn. Powermetal.de rated the album 8 out of 10. While the reviewer needed to adjust his expectations of Terence Holler based on the new genre, Reborn did "offer a wealth of fine music" and was "beautiful, soulful work". Metal Hammer reviewed Reborn in both the German and Italian editions. The German reviewer only found it half-decent, scoring it 3.5 out of 7. The songwriting and vocals were decent, but the tempo was boring and the lyrics "borderline moronic". The Italian reviewer was more positive, calling the vocal performance "superb" at times. Still, the track list could have been reduced somewhat. His score was 65 out of 100. DPRP rated the album as a 5. Norway's Scream Magazine opined that the melodious hard rock found on Reborn was so slick that it almost could not be called "hard". Within its genre, the music was decent, but was a little to anonymous and ultimately did not stick with the listener – the rating being 3 out of 6.

In 2025, Holler released their sophomore Next in Line. Scream gave the same score as before; the album was however a little fresher and punchier. The reviewer praised the cover version of Sia's "Chandelier". Rock Hard bestowed the score 7 (out of 10) upon Reborn, followed by 6.5 for Next in Line. Powermetal.de upped the score to 8.5 compared to the debut, araguing that "every song is instantly catchy" and the music was "definitely" not "run-of-the-mill AOR fare". The production was also good, yielding a "crystal-clear sound".

=== Lineup of Holler ===
- Terence Holler – vocals
- Denis Chimenti – guitar
- Leonardo Peruzzi – bass
- Matteo Chimenti – keyboards
- Alex Gasperini – drums
