= List of gothic metal bands =

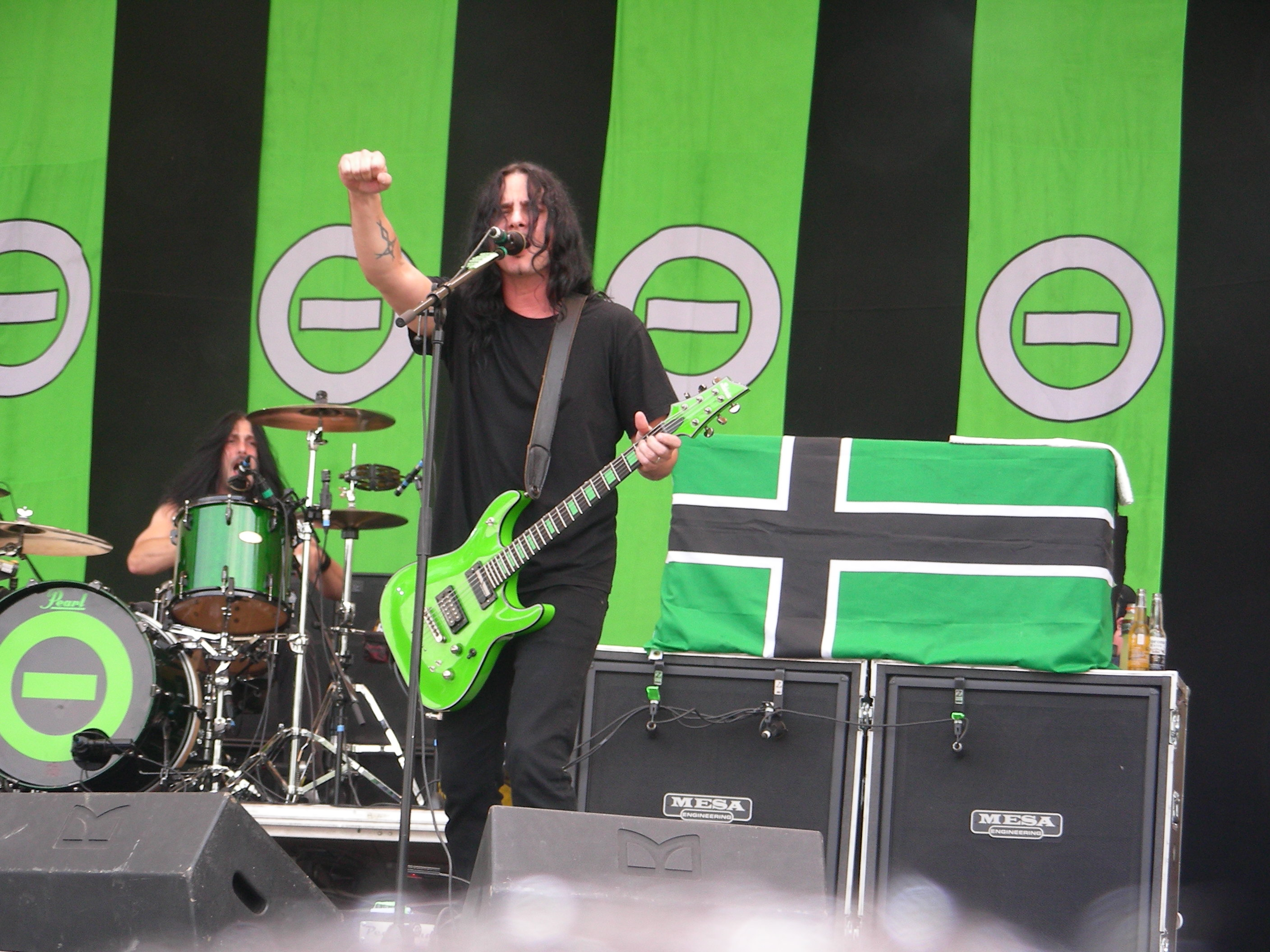
Type O Negative at the 2007 Gods of Metal festival

This is a list of notable gothic metal bands. Gothic metal is a genre of music characterized as a combination of the dark atmosphere of gothic rock with the aggression of heavy metal. The genre originated during the early 1990s in Europe as an outgrowth of death/doom, a fusion of death metal, doom metal, and gothic rock. The music of gothic metal is diverse with bands known to adopt the gothic approach to different styles of heavy metal music. Lyrics are generally melodramatic and dark with inspiration from gothic fiction as well as personal experiences.

Members of metal bands such as After Forever, HIM and Nightwish have downplayed or dismissed the gothic label from their music. The issue is obscured further by bands that have since moved away from gothic metal or even heavy metal music altogether, as is the case for Anathema and The Gathering.

== List of bands ==
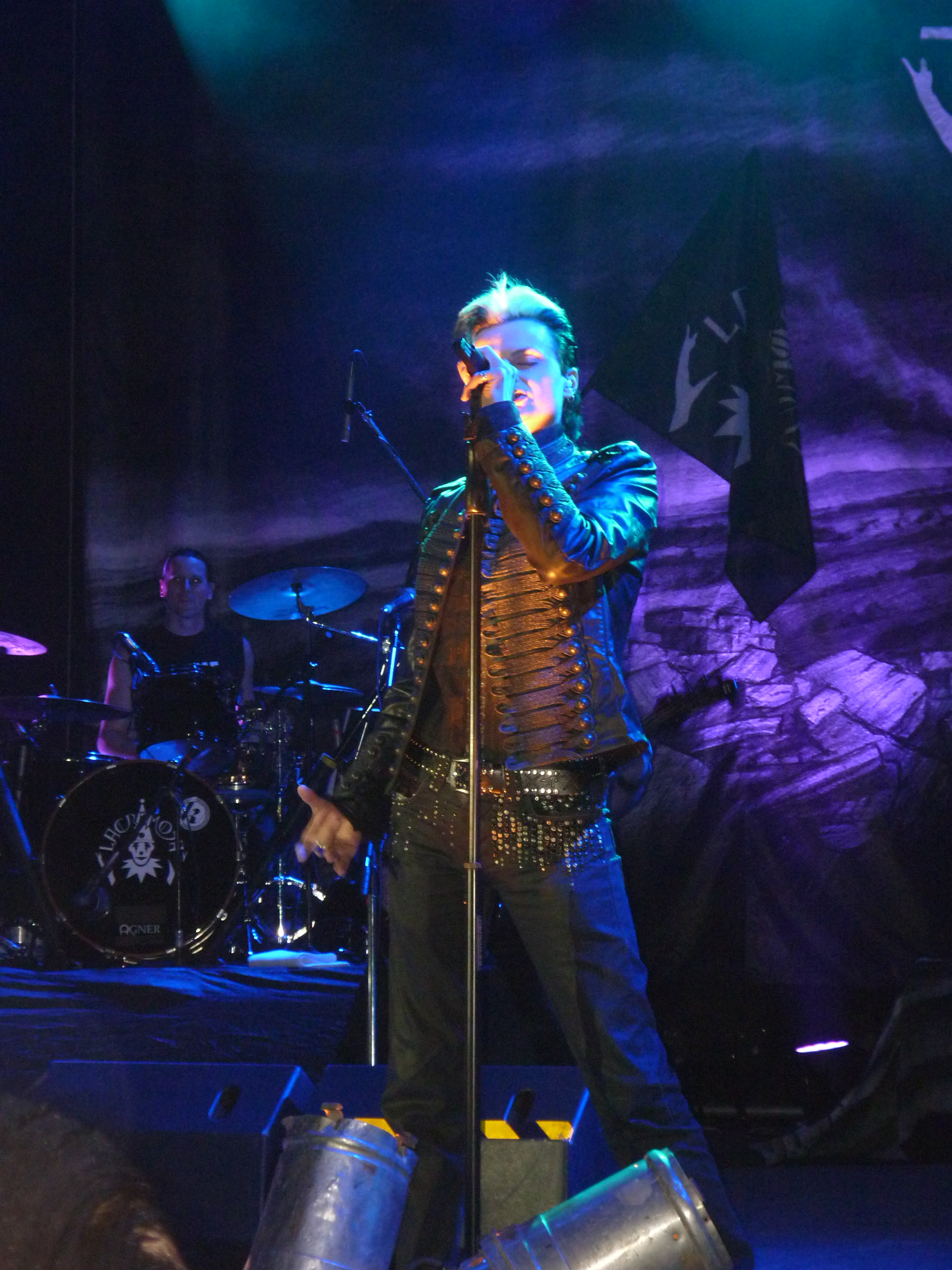
Tilo Wolff of Lacrimosa

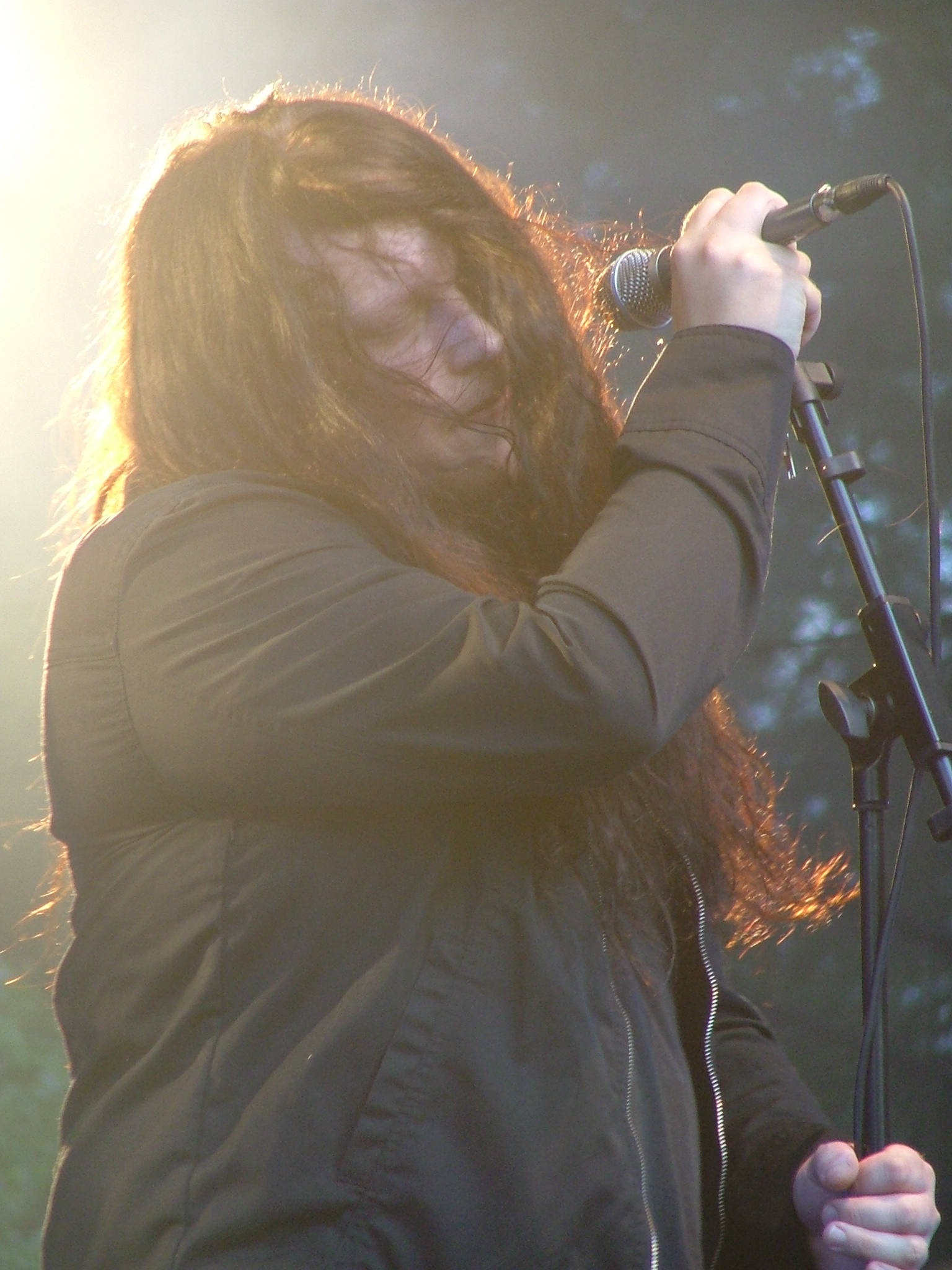
Jonas Renkse of Katatonia

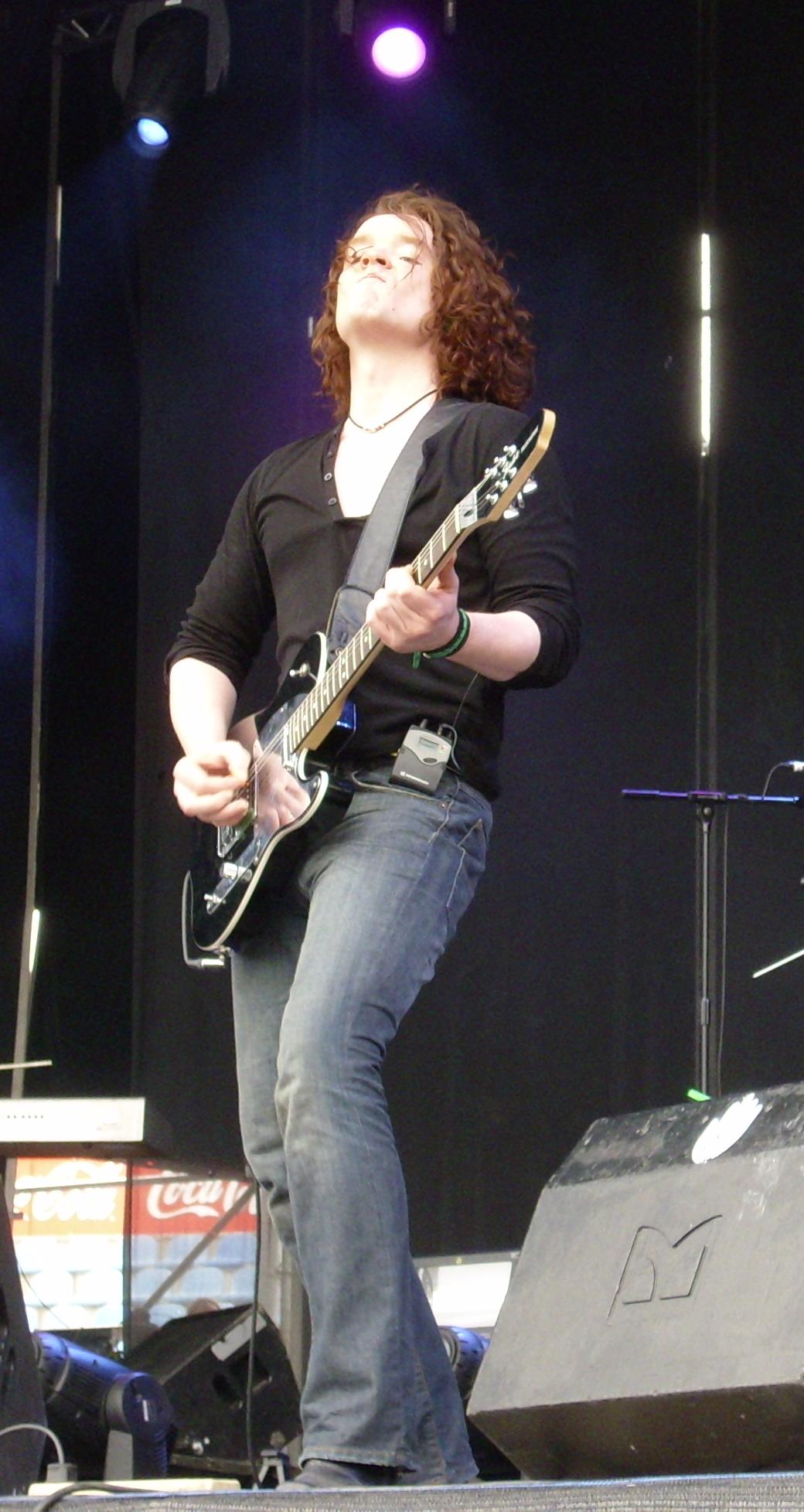
Vincent Cavanagh of Anathema

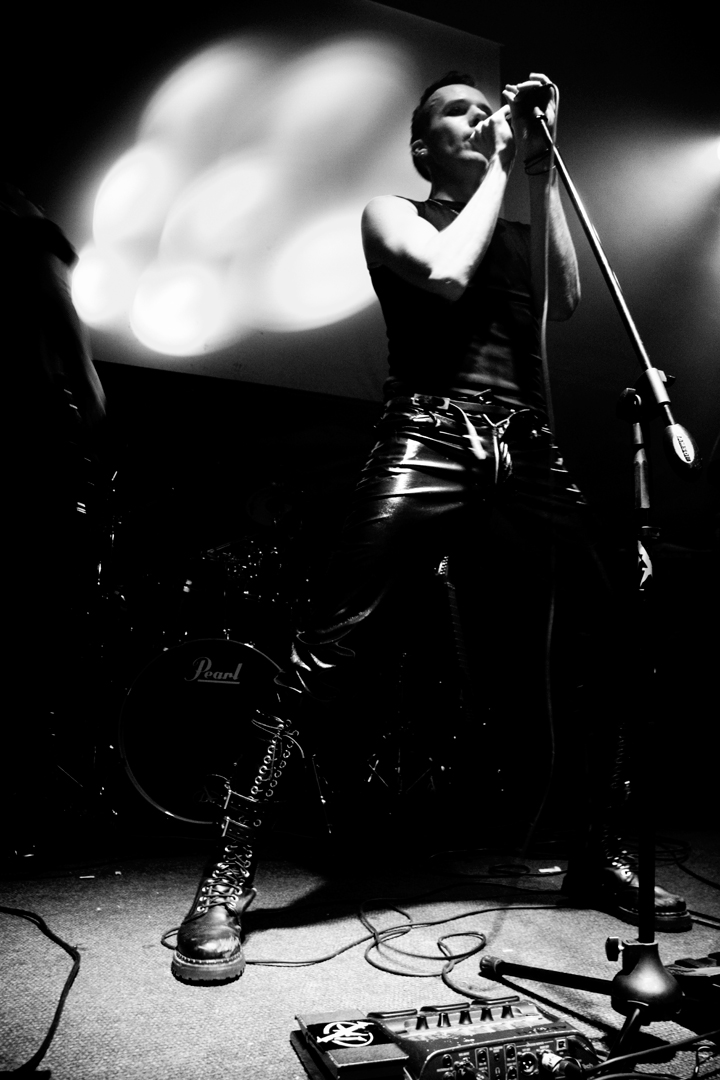
Ashton Nyte of The Awakening

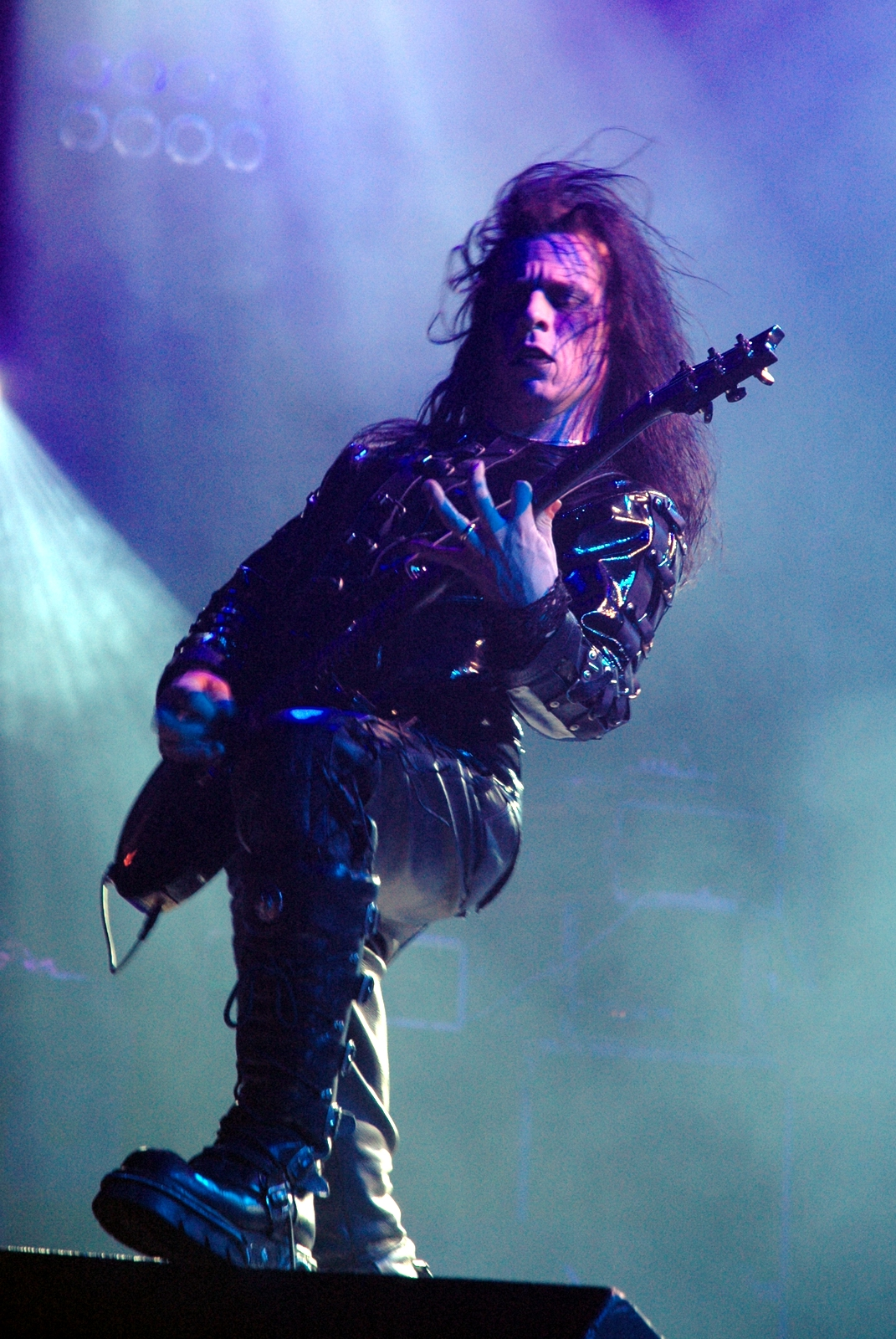
Paul Allender of Cradle of Filth

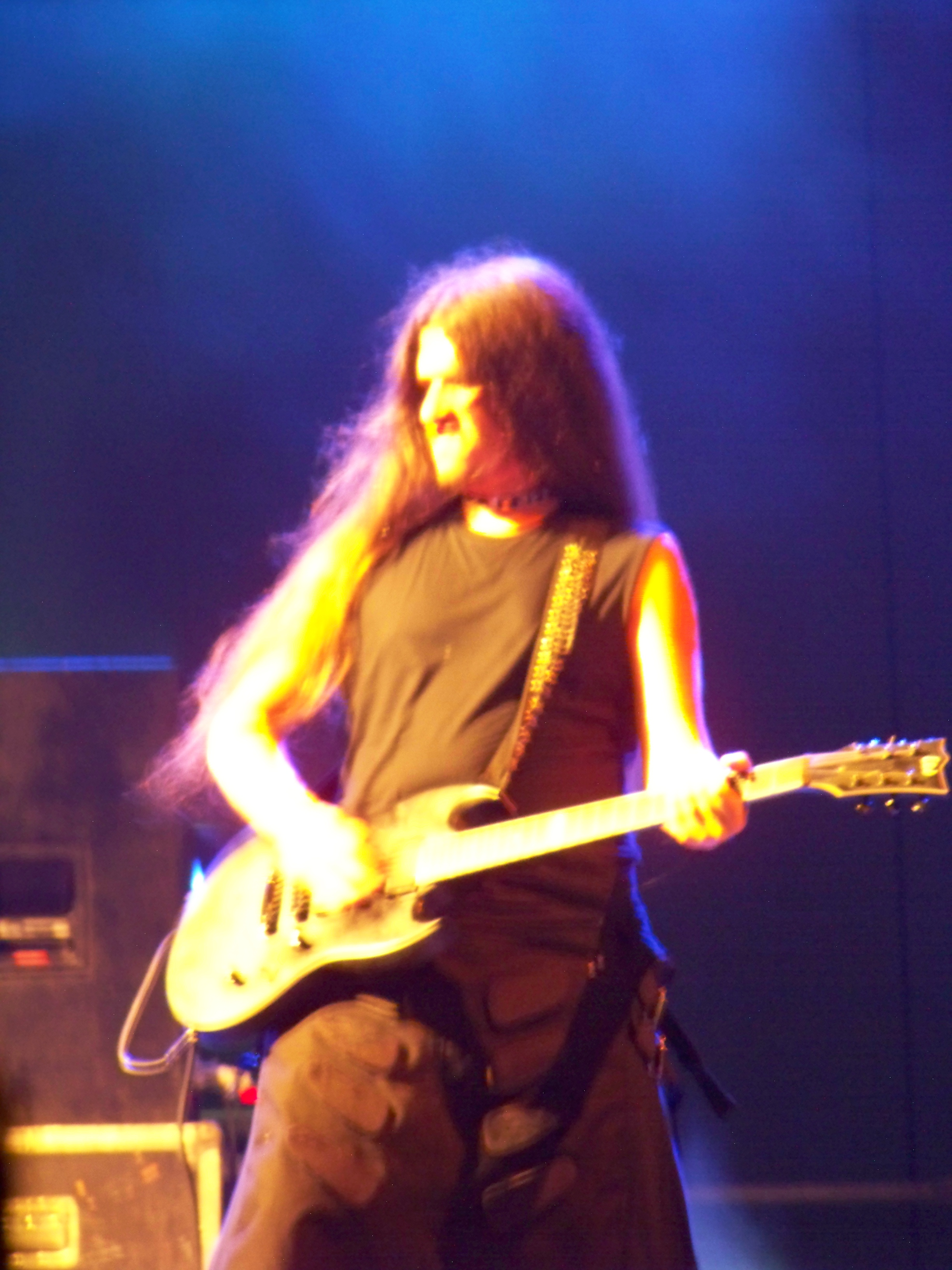
Pepe Herrero of Stravaganzza

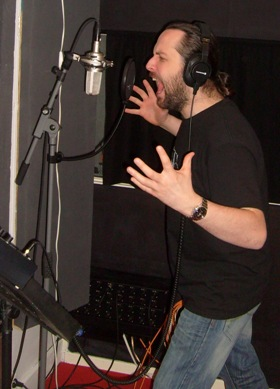
Brian Eddie Reynolds of Creation's Tears

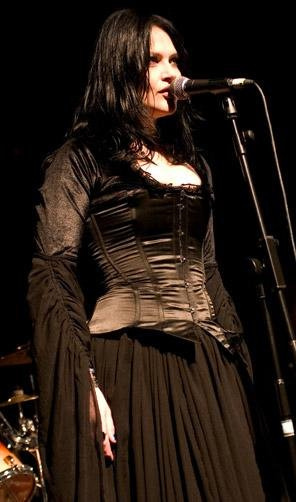
Vibeke Stene ex member of Tristania

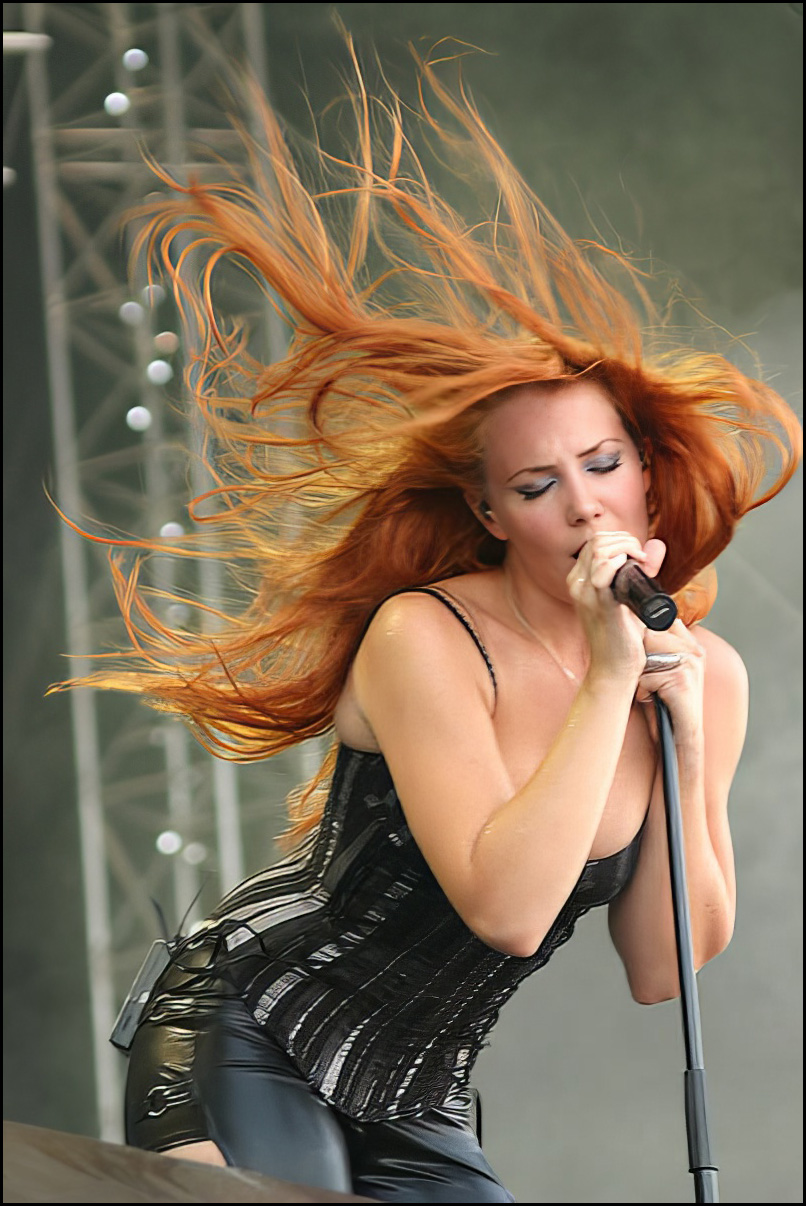
Simone Simons of Epica

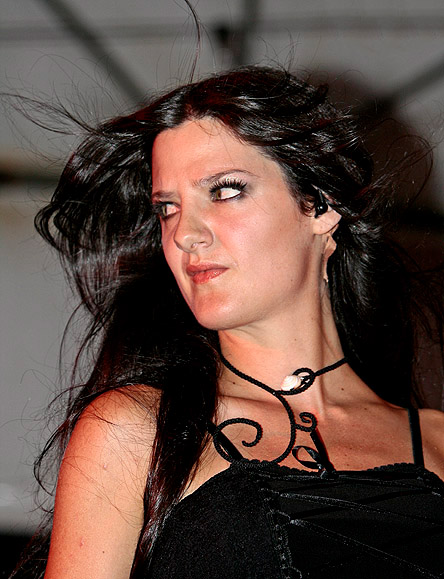
Zuberoa Aznárez of Diabulus in Musica

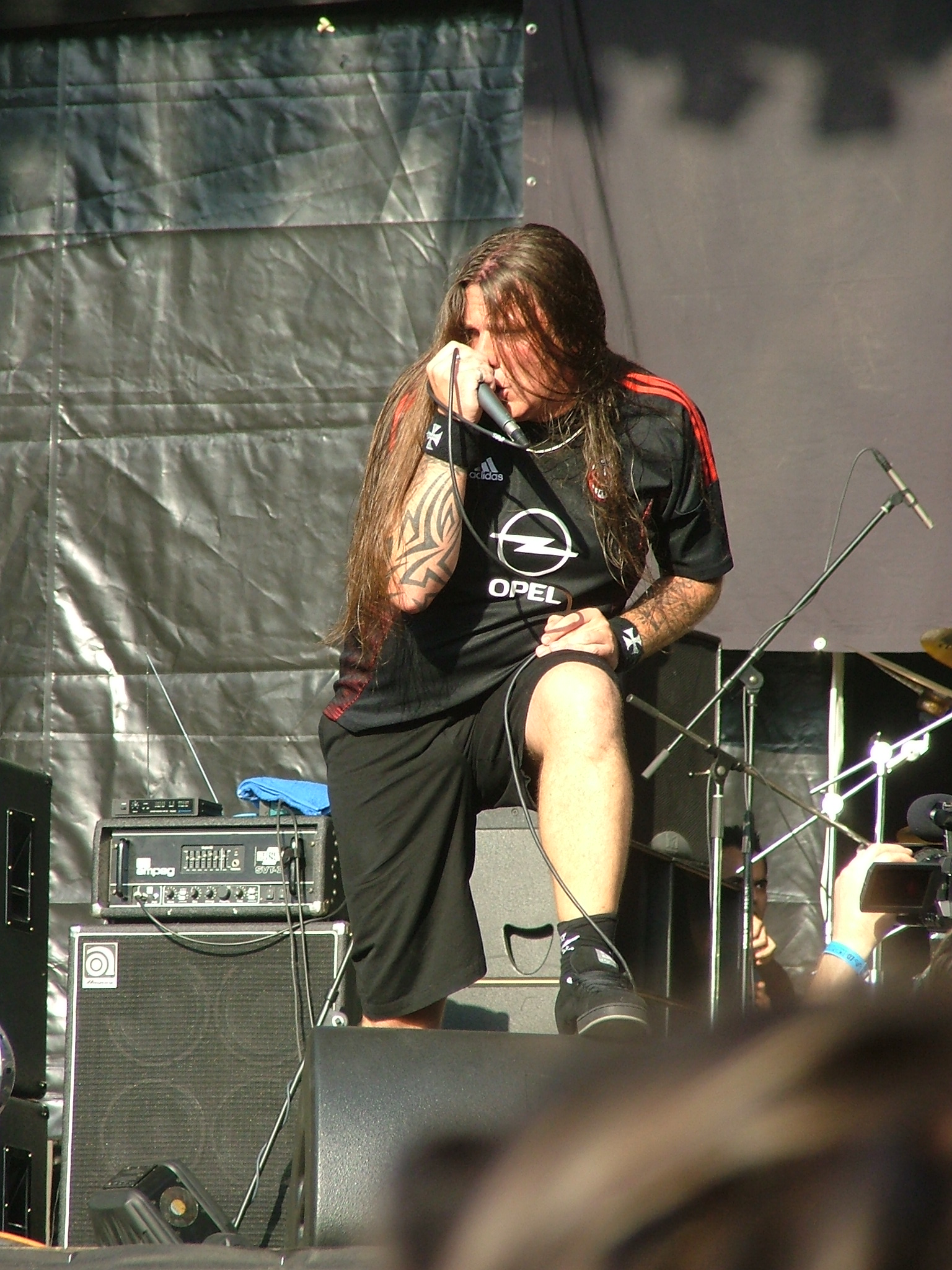
Stefano Fiori of Graveworm

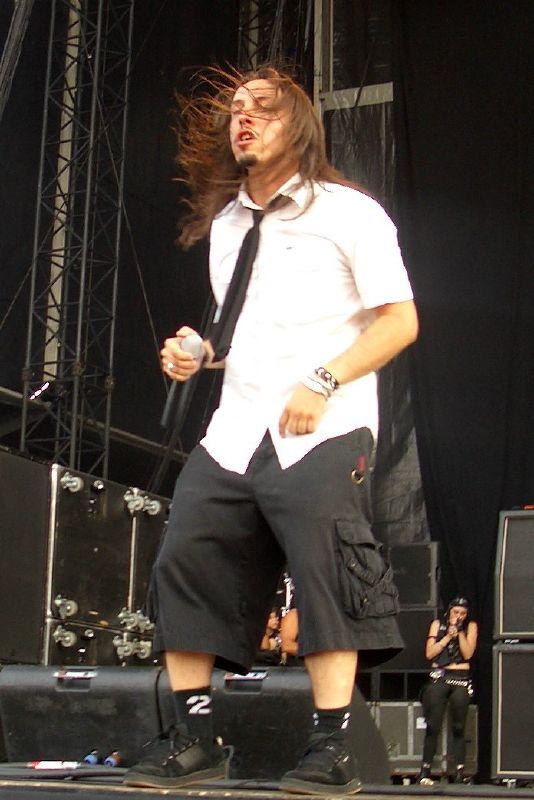
Andrea Ferro of Lacuna Coil

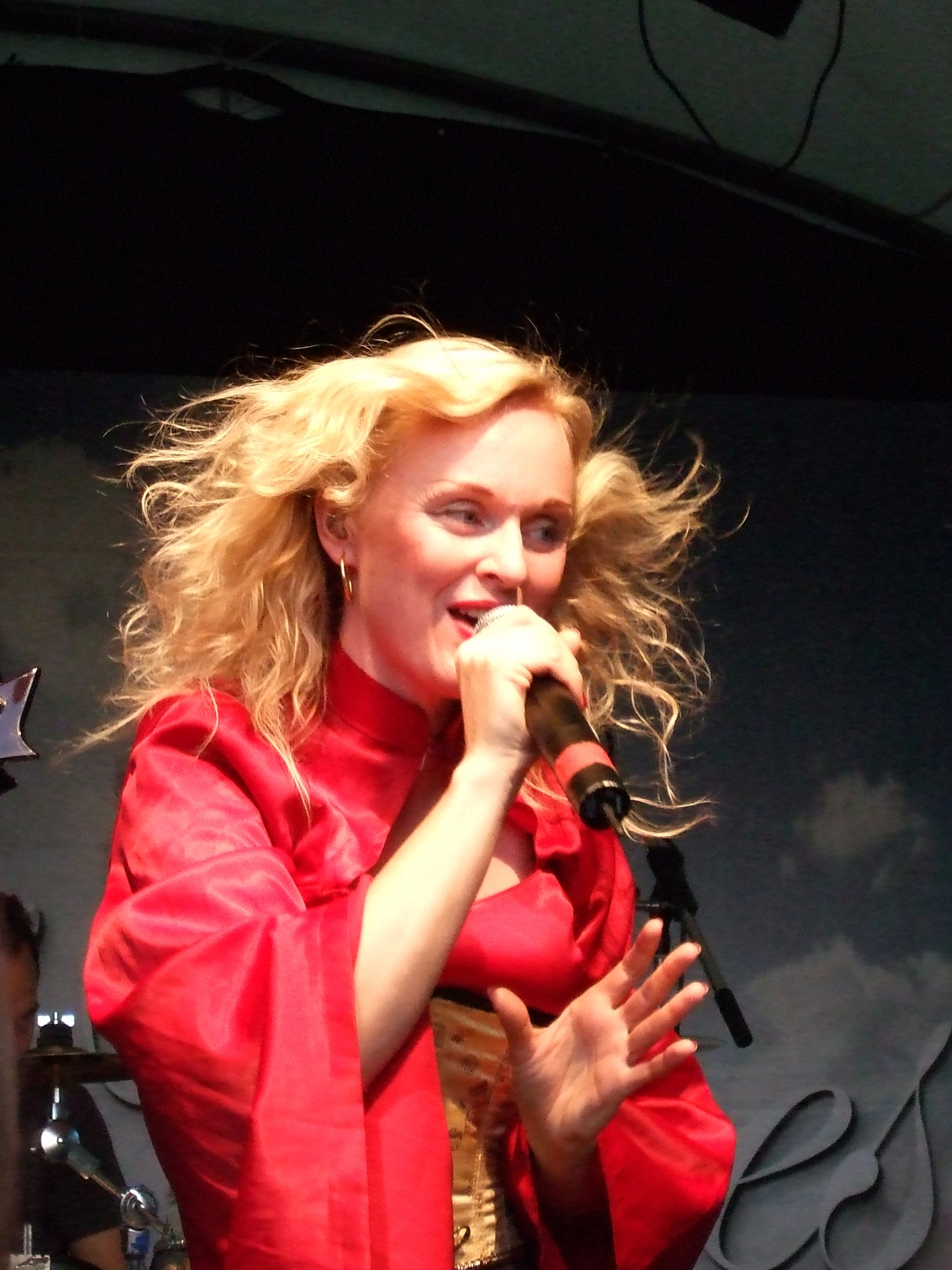
Liv Kristine of Midnattsol

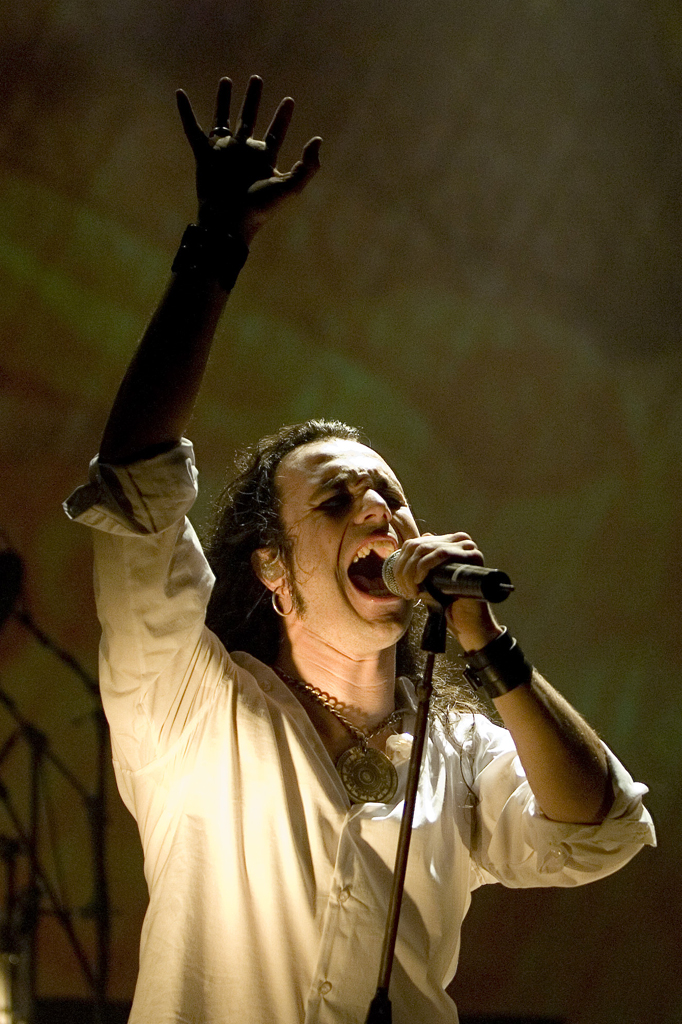
Fernando Ribeiro of Moonspell

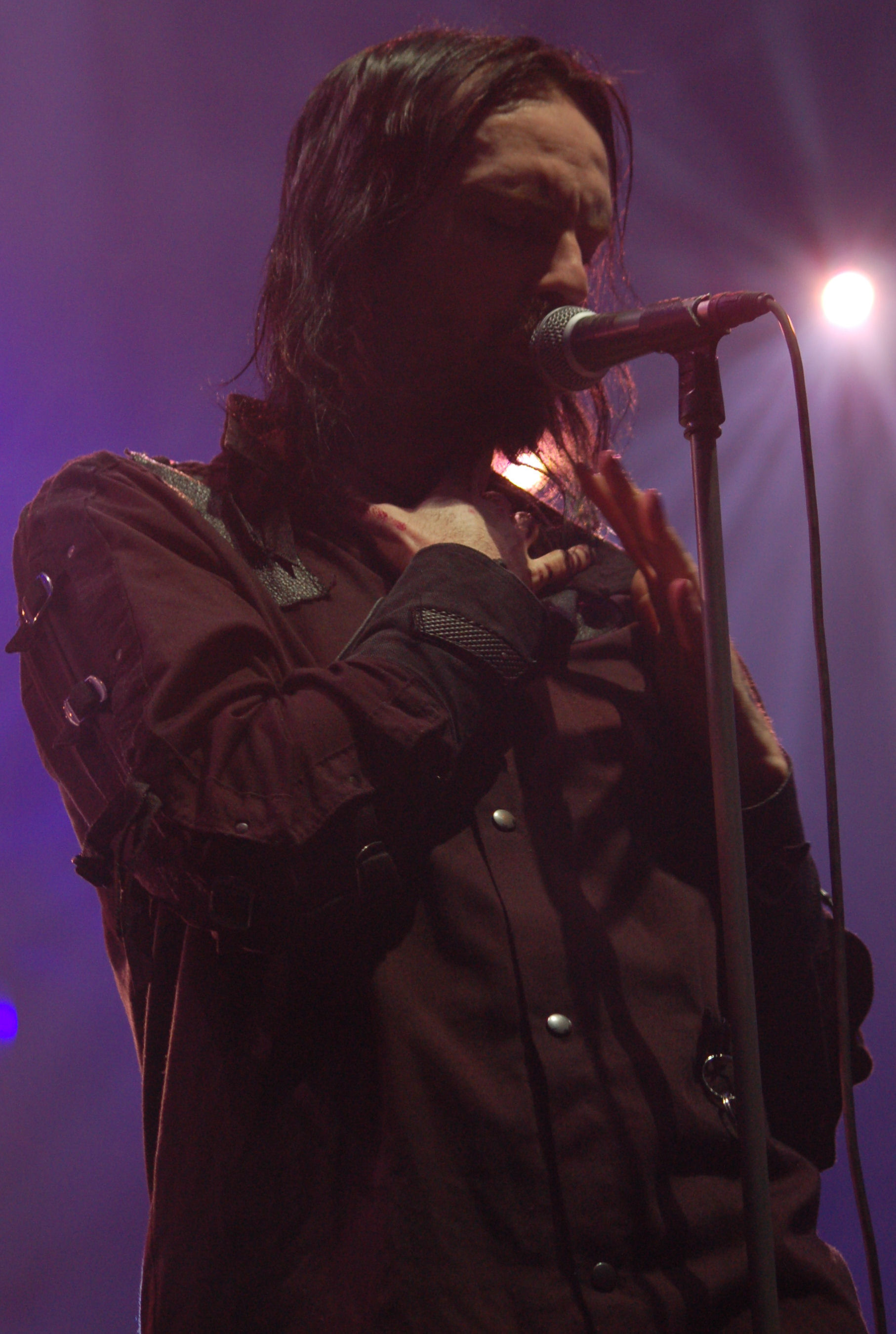
Aaron Stainthorpe of My Dying Bride

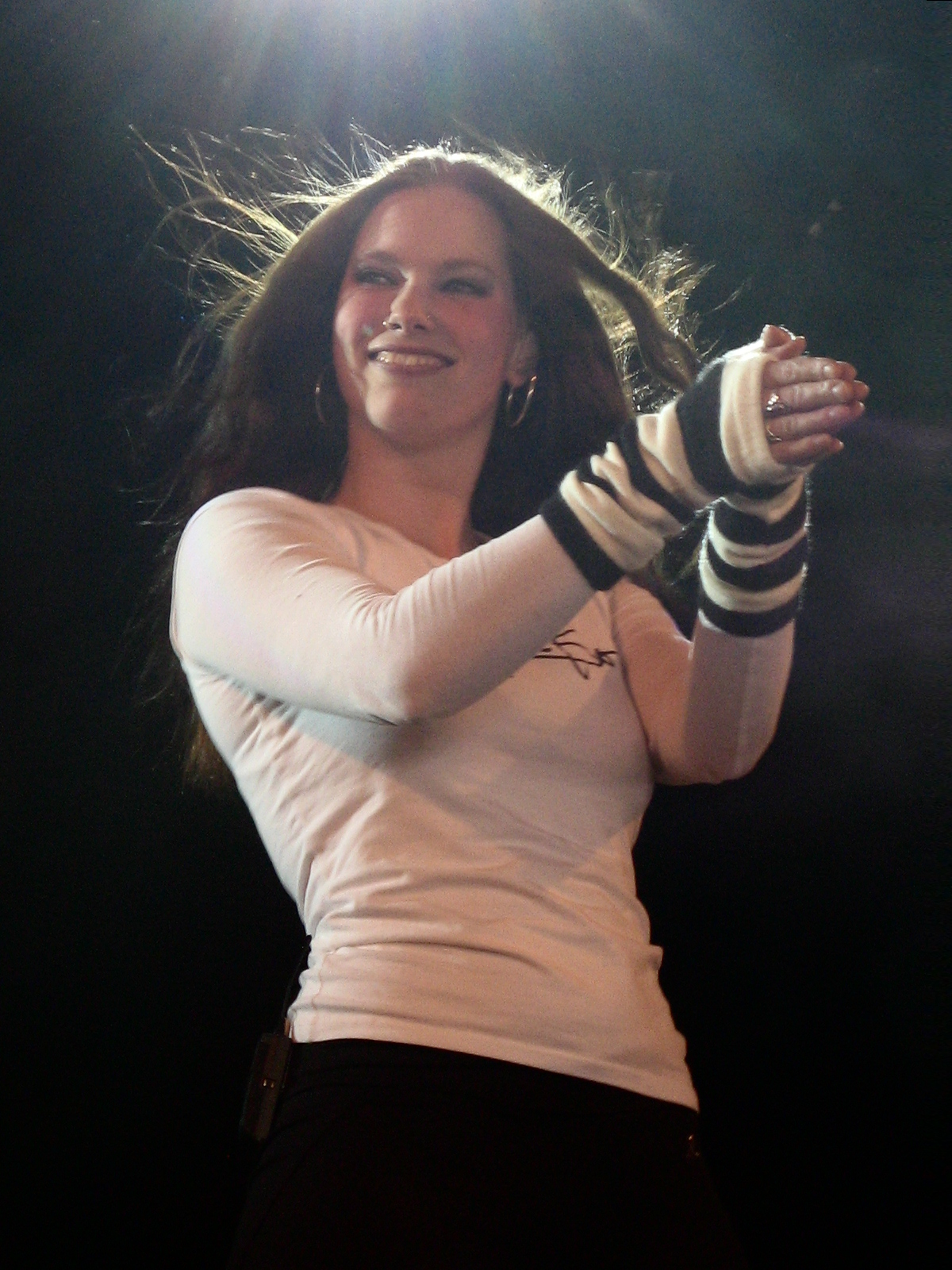
Manda Ophuis of Nemesea

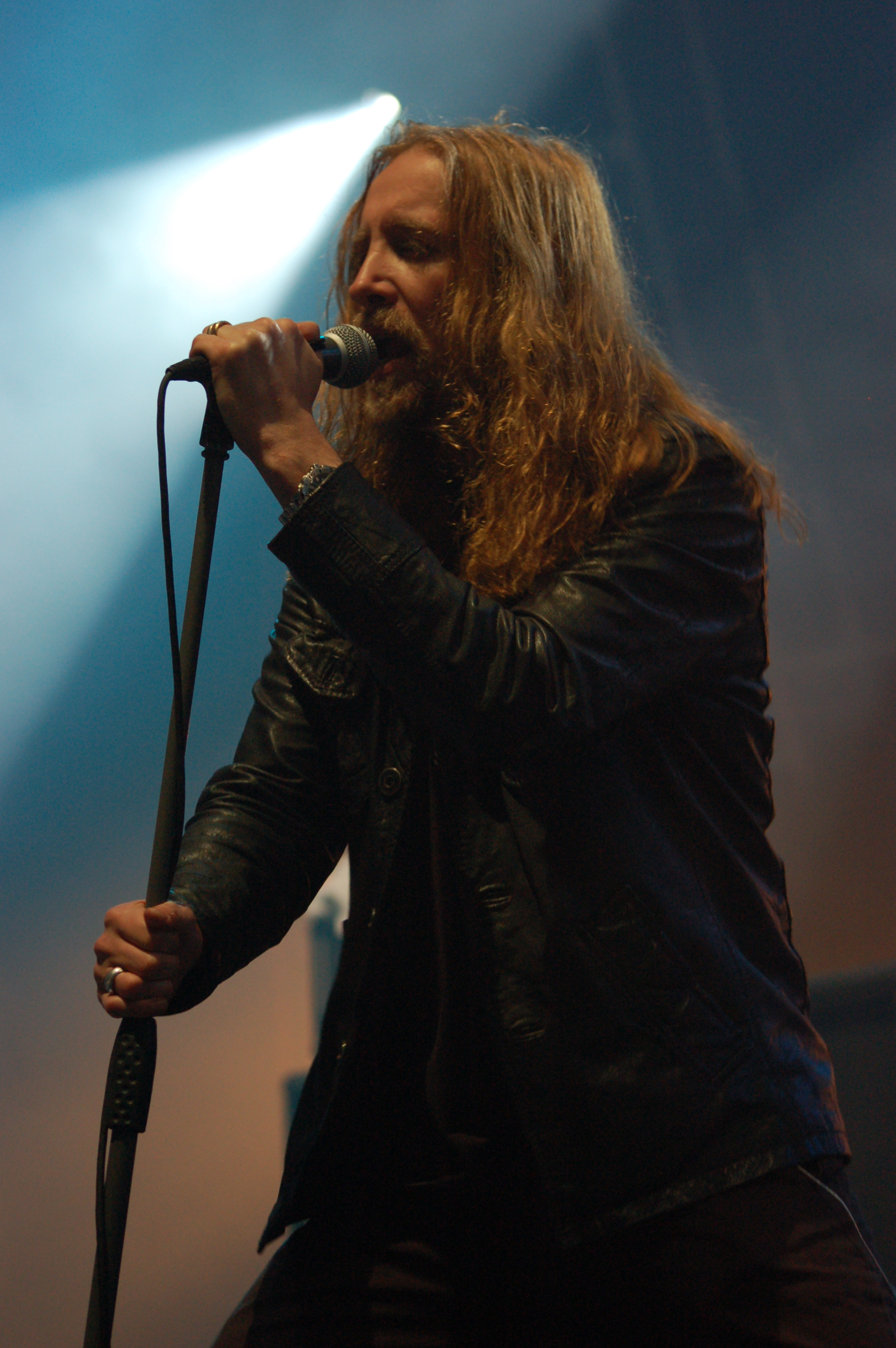
Nick Holmes of Paradise Lost

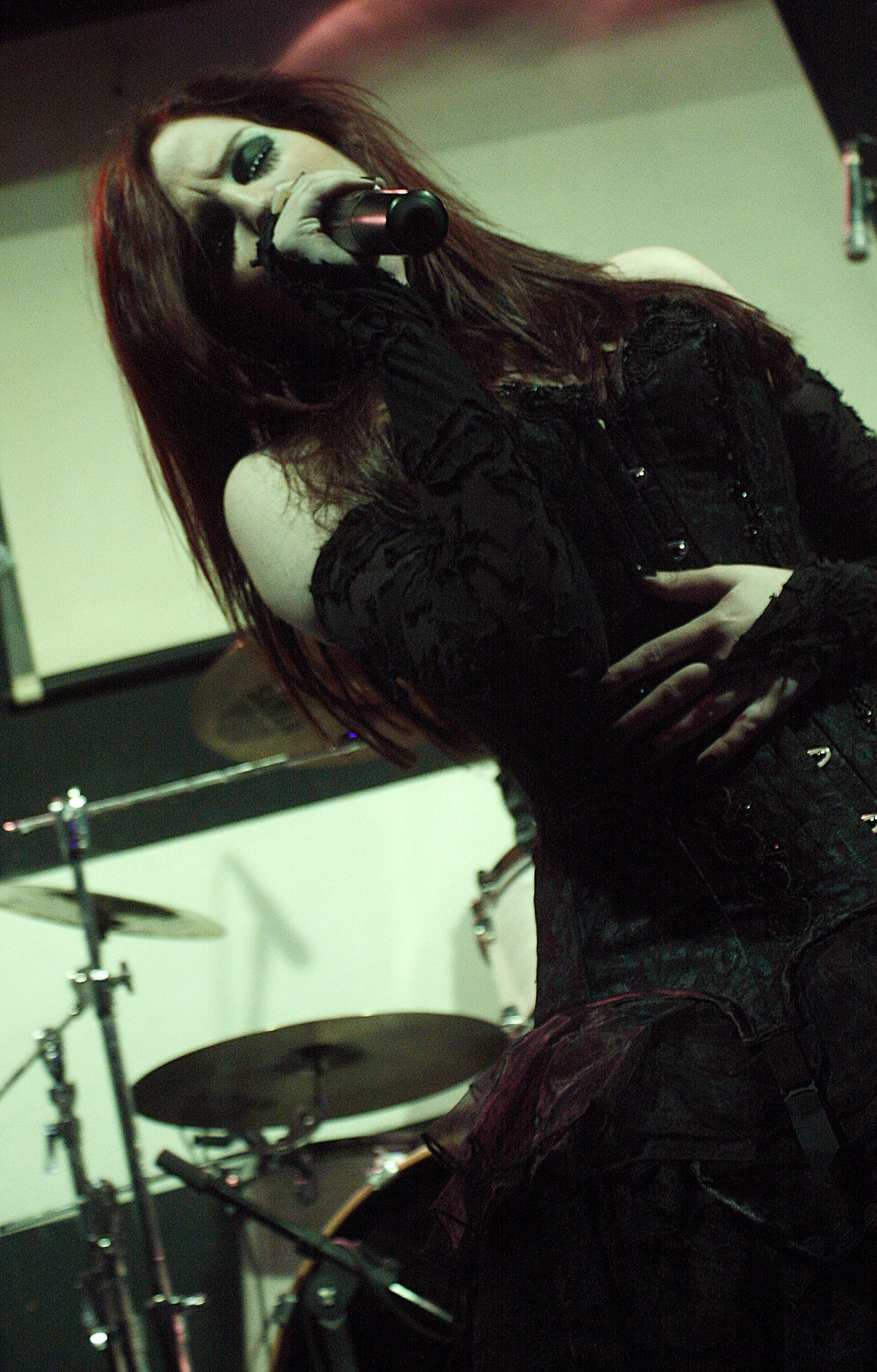
Ailyn of Sirenia

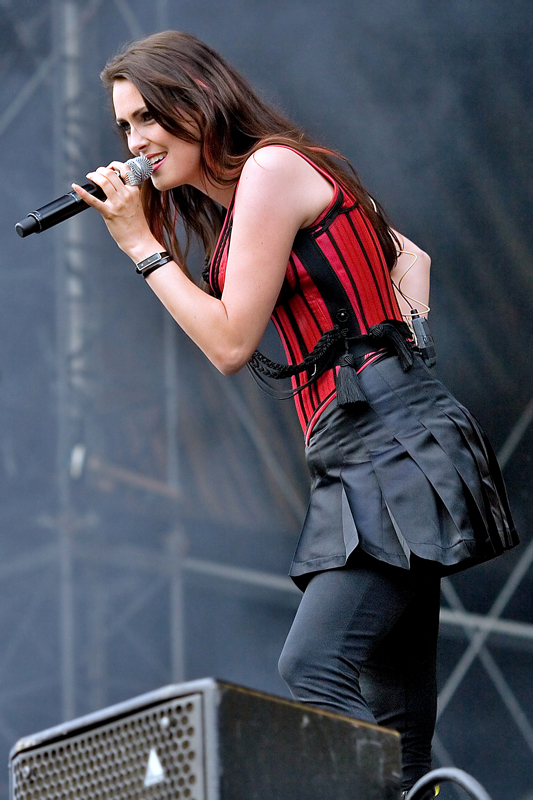
Sharon den Adel of Within Temptation

Band	Country	Formed	References
The 69 Eyes	Finland	1989	
Ad Inferna	France / USA	1998	
After Forever	Netherlands	1995	
Agathodaimon	Germany	1995	
Amorphis	Finland	1990	
Anathema	UK	1990	
April Weeps	Slovakia	2010	
Artrosis	Poland	1995	
ASP	Germany	1999	
Asrai	Netherlands	1988	
Atargatis	Germany	1997	
Atrocity	Germany	1985	
Autumn	Netherlands	1995	
Ava Inferi	Portugal	2005	
Ave Mujica	Japan	2023	
Awakening, The	South Africa/USA	1995	
Beseech	Sweden	1992	
Bloody Hammers	USA	1999	
Cadaveria	Italy	2001	
Cemetary	Sweden	1989	
Cemetery Skyline	Sweden	2024	
Chalice	Australia	1997	
Charon	Finland	1992	
Celtic Frost	Switzerland	1984	
Coal Chamber	USA	1992	
Coronatus	Germany	1999	
Cradle of Filth	UK	1991	
Creation's Tears	UK	2002	
Crematory	Germany	1991	
Cryptal Darkness	Australia	1993	
Cult of Luna	Sweden	1998	
Danzig	USA	1987	
Dark Princess	Russia	2004	
Darkseed	Germany	1992	
Darkwell	Austria	1999	
Deathstars	Sweden	2001	
Delain	Netherlands	2002	
Devilment	UK	2011	
Diabulus in Musica	Spain	2006	
Draconian	Sweden	1994	
Drastique	Italy	1995	
Eisregen	Germany	1995	
Elis	Liechtenstein	2001	
Elysion	Greece	2006	
Entwine	Finland	1995	
Epica	Netherlands	2003	
Erben der Schöpfung	Liechtenstein	1998	
The Eternal	Australia	2003	
Eternal Tears of Sorrow	Finland	1994	
Evanescence	USA	1995	
Eyes of Eden	Germany	2005	
Fall of the Leafe	Finland	1996	
Fatum Aeternum	Israel	2006	
Flowing Tears	Germany	1994	
Forever Slave	Spain	2000	
For My Pain...	Finland	1999	
Graveworm	Italy	1997	
HIM	Finland	1991	
In Mourning	Sweden	1997	
In This Moment	USA	2005	
Katatonia	Sweden	1991	
The Kovenant	Norway	1999	
Krypteria	Germany	2001	
Lacrimas Profundere	Germany	1993	
Lacrimosa	Germany	1990	
Lacuna Coil	Italy	1994	
L'Âme Immortelle	Austria	1996	
Leah	Canada	2011	
Leaves' Eyes	Germany	2003	
Letzte Instanz	Germany	1996	
Lullacry	Finland	1999	
Lyriel	Germany	2003	
Macbeth	Italy	1995	
Madder Mortem	Norway	1993	
Mandragora Scream	Italy	1997	
Marilyn Manson	USA	1989	
Metalwings	Bulgaria	2010	
Midnattsol	Germany	2002	
Moi dix Mois	Japan	2002	
Moonspell	Portugal	1992	
Monumentum	Italy	1987	
Mortal Love	Norway	2001	
My Dying Bride	UK	1990	
Nahemah	Spain	1997	
Nemesea	Netherlands	2002	
Nightwish	Finland	1996	
Nocturna	Italy	2021	
Notre Dame	Sweden	1997	
Octavia Sperati	Norway	2000	
Old Dead Tree, The	France	1997	
Omega Lithium	Croatia	2007	
On Thorns I Lay	Greece	1992	
Pale Horse Named Death, A	USA	2011	
Paradise Lost	UK	1988	
Poisonblack	Finland	2000	
Psycho Synner	USA	2020	
Pyogenesis	Germany	1991	
Rotting Christ	Greece	1987	
Saviour Machine	United States	1989	
Schaliach	Norway	1995	
Sentenced	Finland	1989	
Silentium	Finland	1995	
Sinamore	Finland	1998	
Sinnergod	UK	2007	
Sins of Thy Beloved, The	Norway	1996	
Sirenia	Norway	2001	
Stravaganzza	Spain	2004	
Stream of Passion	Netherlands	2005	
Theatre of Tragedy	Norway	1993	
Theatres des Vampires	Italy	1994	
The Murder of My Sweet	Sweden	2006	
Therion	Sweden	1987	
Tiamat	Sweden	1988	
To/Die/For	Finland	1993	
Trail of Tears	Norway	1994	
Tribulation	Sweden	2005	
Tristania	Norway	1996	
Type O Negative	USA	1989	
Umbra et Imago	Germany	1991	
Undish	Poland	1991	
Unshine	Finland	2000	
UnSun	Poland	2006	
Unto Others	United States	2017	
Urban Tales	Portugal	2005	
Virgin Black	Australia	1993	
Vision Bleak, The	Germany	2000	
We Are the Fallen	USA	2009	
Within Temptation	Netherlands	1996	
Woods of Ypres	Canada	2002	
Xandria	Germany	1997	
Yōsei Teikoku	Japan	1997	
