= Metal Female Voices Fest =

Heavy metal music festival in Belgium

- Genre: Heavy metal, Symphonic metal, Gothic metal, Alternative metal, Folk metal, others
- Dates: Autumn
- Locations: Wieze, East Flanders, Belgium
- Years active: 2003–2017, 2019
- Website: metalfemalevoicesfest.be

Metal Female Voices Fest was a heavy metal music festival dedicated to female vocalists, held annually in the Oktoberhallen in Wieze, Belgium from 2003 to 2016. It was organized by the Metal Organisation, which later changed into "2 Wild 4 agency". The festival enables smaller and unknown bands with female vocalists to perform on a big stage beside bigger and more famous bands.

Over the years, they gave away special awards or organized a warm-up which allowed bands to compete to perform on the festival for the next year.

On 13 February 2017, it was announced that the Metal Female Voices Fest is put on indefinite hold. On 10 December 2018, it has been confirmed that a Japanese edition of MFVF will take place in Osaka and Tokyo in April 2019.

In 2020, the official website of the Metal Female Voices Fest went dead.

== Lineups ==
=== 2019 ===
==== Japan ====
- Leaves' Eyes
- Anneke van Giersbergen's VUUR
- Mary's Blood (Tokyo only)
- Evig Natt
- Sailing to Nowhere
- Ancient Myth (Osaka only)
- Rakshasa (Osaka only)
- Eleanor (Tokyo only)

=== 2017 ===
"On hold"

=== 2016 ===
MFVF 2016
October 21	October 22	October 23
Acoustic shows	Leaves' Eyes; MaYaN; Battlelore; Kontrust; Artrosis; Spoil Engine; Savn; Crescent Lament; Ancient Myth; Mourning Sun; Evig Natt	Tarja; Liv Kristine + Raymond Rohonyi; Tristania; Whyzdom; Enemy of Reality; Feridea; Blackthorn; Skarlett Riot; Mercy Isle

=== 2014 ===
MFVF 2014
October 17	October 18	October 19
MFV United; Saeko; Ayin Aleph; Diary of Destruction	Leaves' Eyes; The Sirens (Anneke Van Giersbergen, Kari Rueslåtten & Liv Kristine); Sirenia; Draconian; Diabulus in Musica; Head Phones President; Skeptical Minds; Jaded Star; Ancient Bards; Dark Sarah; Season of Ghosts; La-Ventura	Therion; Arkona; Xandria; Holy Moses; Stream of Passion; Viper Solfa; Enemy of Reality; Magistina Saga; Evenoire; Aria Flame

=== 2013 ===
MFVF 2013
October 18	October 19	October 20
Eve's Apple; Liv Kristine	Lacuna Coil; Delain + Sharon den Adel; Leaves' Eyes; Kontrust; Asrai; Kobra and the Lotus; Chaostar; Serenity; Imperia; Victorians; Azylya; Magion	Tarja + Floor Jansen; ReVamp; Anneke van Giersbergen; Crimfall; Stream of Passion; Cadaveria; Eleanor; Dalriada; Hell City; L'Endevi

=== 2012 ===
MFVF 2012
October 20	October 21
Lacuna Coil; Arch Enemy; Delain; Arkona; Amberian Dawn; Skeptical Minds; Dimlight; Lahannya; Seduce the Heaven; Benighted Soul; Crysalys; Anwynn	Epica; Xandria; Diabulus in Musica; Trail of Tears; Sarah Jezebel Deva; Trillium; 69 Chambers; November-7; Meden Agan; Valkyre

=== 2011 ===
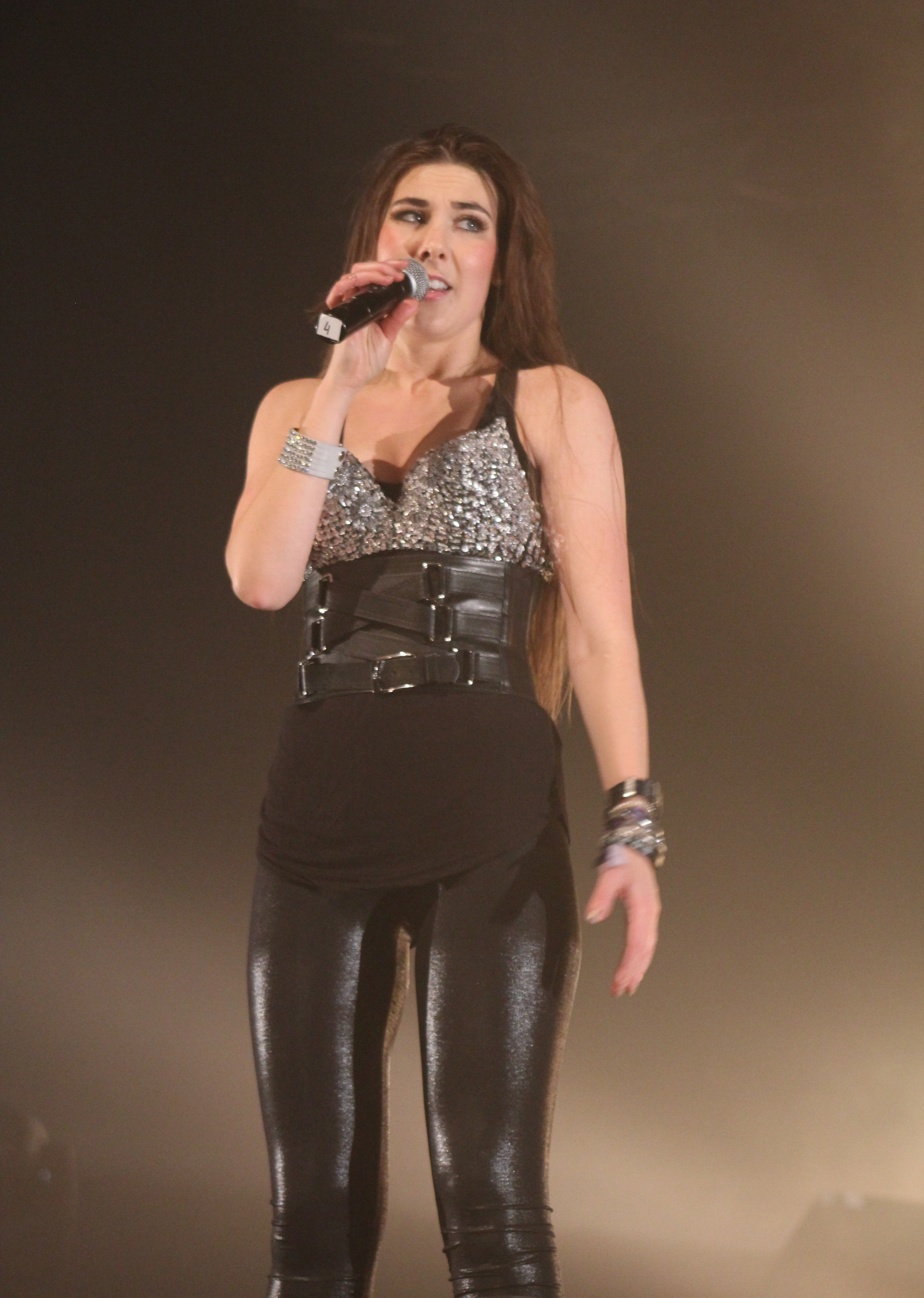
Elize Ryd at the Metal Female Voices Fest in 2011

MFVF 2011
October 21	October 22	October 23
Battlelore; Xandria; Bare Infinity	Doro; Leaves' Eyes; Diabulus in Musica; Trail of Tears; Benedictum; Dylath-Leen; Deadlock; Amaranthe; Kivimetsän Druidi; Coma Divine; Nemhain; Hanging Doll	Therion; Visions of Atlantis; Draconian; Stream of Passion; System Divide; Midnattsol; Triosphere; VelvetSeal; Operatika; Diary About My Nightmares

=== 2010 ===
MFVF 2010
October 22	October 23	October 24
Hells Belles; Manic Movement; The Veil	Arch Enemy; ReVamp; Krypteria; Tristania; Dylath-Leen; Visions of Atlantis; Skeptical Minds; 69 Chambers; UnSun; Godyva; Pythia	Epica; Leaves' Eyes; HolyHell; Diabulus in Musica; Sarah Jezebel Deva; The Agonist; Omega Lithium; Ram-Zet; Anwynn

=== 2009 ===
The seventh edition took place at Oktoberhallen in Wieze in the municipality of Lebbeke on October 17 and October 18, 2009.

MFVF 2009
October 17	October 18
Epica; Delain; Midnattsol; Krypteria; Flowing Tears; Autumn; Amberian Dawn; Kivimetsän Druidi; UnSun; Manic Movement; Pinky Doodle Poodle; Whyzdom	Tarja; Doro; Trail of Tears; Van Canto; Darzamat; Stream of Passion; Lahannya; Deadlock; To-Mera; Coronatus

=== 2008 ===

MFVF 2008
October 17	October 18
Girlschool; Eths; Benedictum; Izegrim; White Skull; Dylath-Leen; ChaosWave; Ethernity; Why She Kills	Tarja; Epica; L'Âme Immortelle; Trail of Tears; Midnattsol (canceled); Asrai; Diablo Swing Orchestra; Macbeth; Edenbridge; Atargatis; Kells; Markize

=== 2007 ===
Theatre of Tragedy, who had already pulled out of the 2006 festival, were initially scheduled to perform on October 20 as the fifth band on the bill. On February 2 it was announced that they had decided to cancel their appearance, with no explanation given. They were replaced by Autumn. The Gathering and After Forever also canceled, respectively on February 15, being replaced by Delain, and May 4, being replaced by Flowing Tears. The lineup was later reshuffled so Sirenia and Epica ended up taking After Forever and The Gathering's place. Darzamat, Autumn and Imperia also pulled out shortly before the date of the festival.

MFVF 2007
October 13 (Warm-Up) †	October 17 ‡	October 18 ‡
Seraphim; Kells; Markize; Ethernity; Sad Siberia	Doro; Holy Moses; Dylath-Leen; Tourettes; Darzamat (canceled); Benedictum (canceled)	Leaves' Eyes; Epica; Sirenia; Flowing Tears; Seraphim; Delain; Elis; Draconian; Battlelore; Distorted; Valkyre; Interria; Autumn (canceled); Imperia (canceled)

_{†Held at Ten Weyngaert, Brussels. / ‡Held at Oktoberhallen, Wieze.}

=== 2006 ===
Held on October 21 at Oktoberhallen in Wieze. Theatre of Tragedy canceled their appearance on October 20 because two band members were sick. Delain were initially going to play as a special guest, but they effectively replaced Theatre of Tragedy in the lineup. The event was also dedicated to the late Elis singer, Sabine Dünser, who passed on July of that year. The remaining members of Elis were in attendance at the festival and had performed the year prior at the event.

MFVF 2006
October 21

Tristania
Delain
Lullacry
Midnattsol
Forever Slave
Xandria
Sengir
Visions of Atlantis
Skeptical Minds
Naio Ssaion
The Legion of Hetheria
Anachronia
Theatres des Vampires
Macbeth

=== 2005 ===
Held at Oktoberhallen, Wieze.

MFVF 2005
October 22

Lacuna Coil
After Forever
Epica
Leaves' Eyes
Mercury Rain
Midnattsol
Asrai
Elis
Autumn
Skeptical Minds
The Legion of Hetheria
Anachronia
Diluvium (did not appear)

=== 2004 ===
Held at Ancienne Belgique, Brussels.

MFVF 2004
November 7

Nightwish
Epica
Flowing Tears
Darkwell
Sengir
Visions of Atlantis
Syrens Call
Ashes You Leave

=== 2003 ===
Held at Ten Weyngaert, Forest.

MFVF 2003
November 8

Epica
Autumn
Anthemon
Sengir
Keltgar
Morning
The Last Embrace
