= Olga Romanova =

Olga Romanova may refer to:

- Grand Duchess Olga Pavlovna of Russia (1792–1795), daughter of Paul I of Russia
- Grand Duchess Olga Nikolaevna of Russia (1895–1918), daughter of Nicholas II of Russia
- Grand Duchess Olga Alexandrovna of Russia (1882–1960), daughter of Alexander III of Russia
- Olga Nikolaevna of Russia (1822–1892), daughter of Nicholas I of Russia
- Olga Constantinovna of Russia (1851–1926), granddaughter of Nicholas I of Russia
- Grand Duchess Olga Feodorovna of Russia (1839–1891), daughter-in-law of Nicholas I of Russia
- Olga Romanova (athlete) (born 1980), Russian long-distance runner
- Olga "Dark Princess" Romanova, former lead singer of the Gothic metal band Dark Princess
- Victim in the Moscow theater hostage crisis
- Olga Romanova (journalist) (born 1966), television and newspaper journalist, opposition activist
- Princess Olga Andreevna Romanoff
