= Bleed for Me =

Bleed for Me may refer to:

- "Bleed for Me" (Black Label Society song)
- "Bleed for Me" (Dead Kennedys song)
- "Bleed for Me" (Lahannya song)
