= Vanitas (disambiguation) =

Vanitas is a type of symbolic work of art.

Vanitas may also refer to:

- Vanitas (Macbeth album) (2001)
- Vanitas (Anaal Nathrakh album) (2012)
- Vanitas (Kingdom Hearts), a character of Kingdom Hearts
- Vanitas (The Case Study of Vanitas), the main character of The Case Study of Vanitas
- Vanitas, a song by Dir En Grey off of their 2011 album, Dum Spiro Spero
- Vanitas, a song by Revocation off of their 2018 album, The Outer Ones
- Vanitas, a British heavy metal band

== See also ==
- Vanity, one of the Seven Deadly Sins in Christian theology
- The Case Study of Vanitas, a manga series
