= Inhuman =

Inhuman may refer to:

== Comics ==
- Inhumans, a fictional race in Marvel Comics
  - Inhuman (comics), a comic book series focusing on Inhumans
  - Inhumans (TV series), a television series set in the Marvel Cinematic Universe

== Music ==
- InHuman (band), a Belgian heavy metal band
- Inhuman (musician), a German DJ
- Inhuman (album), a 2000 album by Desecration
- "Inhuman", a song by Thousand Foot Krutch from their 2007 album The Flame in All of Us
- "Inhumane", a song by Polaris from their 2023 album Fatalism

== See also ==
- Inhumanity (disambiguation)
- Non-human, any entity displaying some human characteristics, but not enough to be considered a human
- Unhumans, 2024 American political book
