= Kells (band) =

French symphonic metal band

- Origin: Lyon, France
- Genres: Symphonic metal, nu metal
- Years active: 2001–2015
- Labels: Season of Mist

Kells was a symphonic metal band out of Lyon, France, formed in 2001 by vocalist Virginie Goncalves, guitarist Patrick Garcia, and keyboardist Fabrice Desire. Since then Fabrice has left the band while Julien Nicolas and Laurent Lesina were added as the band's drummer and bassist respectively. They have played at the Metal Female Voices Festival and been main support for Epica and Tarja. They have released three albums. Their first album, Gaia, was produced by AVFP Production and released in 2005, and their second album, Lueurs, was produced by Season of Mist and released in 2009. Their third album, Anachromie, was released in 2012. In April 2015, Virginie, Patrick (legitimate founders of the project) and Kevin (the last drummer) were forced out of the band.

== History ==
The band was formed in 2001 by Virginie Gonclaves and Fabrice Desire. In 2004 they were given an offer to record an album with AVFP. In 2005 their first album Gaia was released. In order to go on tour with this album they added Jeremie Vinet as bassist and Guillaume Dagnaud as drummer. Because Jeremie was working at the time they also added Laurent Lesina as Jeremie's spare. In 2007 founding member Fabrice left the band because he was about to be a father. Guillaume left later that year for the same reason. Laurent became the full-time bassist and the band replaced Guillame with Julien 'Jano' Nicolas as drummer. In 2009 Season of Mist produced and released their second album Lueurs. They remained with Season of Mist for their third studio album, Anachromie, which was released in 2012.

== Touring ==
In 2008 Kells was invited to be support for Epica's French tour. After the release of Lueurs in 2009 they went on tour throughout Europe as a headliner, with Epica and Tarja Turunen as main supports respectively. In May 2011, Tarja invited Kells to join her and Leaves' Eyes in Switzerland and Germany. In 2012, they went on tour opening for Tristania along with Sarah Jezebel Deva and Sound Storm.

== Musical style and influences ==
Kells was a symphonic nu-metal band. They were influenced by nu-metal bands like Korn, Deftones, and Limp Bizkit while adding symphonic elements to the music similar to the ones used by Evanescence and Within Temptation. They collaborated with French metalcore band Eths on multiple occasions. Eths' lead singer Candice Clot was brought in as a guest vocalist for Kells' song La sphère, from Lueurs. In September 2011 Kells tweeted that Virginie was working on recording two songs with Eths that would be released abroad. All of Kells' songs are in French.

== Discography ==
=== Studio albums ===
- Gaia (2005)
- Lueurs (2009)
- Anachromie (2012)

== Members ==
=== Current members ===
- Virginie Goncalves - vocals
- Patrick Garcia - guitar
- Laurent Lesina - bass
- Kevin Plutta - drums

=== Former members ===
- Fabrice Desire - keyboards (2001-2007)
- Guillaume Dagnaud - drums (2004-2007)
- Jeremie Vinet - bass (2004-2007)
- Jean Padovan - drums (2007-2010)
- Julien Nicolas - drums (2010-2012)

== Website ==
www.Kellsband.com
