= Inhumanity =

Inhumanity may refer to:

- The opposite of humanity
- "Man's inhumanity to man", a phrase first documented in 1784

== Music ==
- Inhumanity (album), a 2003 album by Finnish band Mors Principium Est
- Monolith of Inhumanity, a 2012 studio album by American band Cattle Decapitation
- The Gospel of Inhumanity, a 1995 studio album by American band Blood Axis

== Other uses ==
- "Inhumanity" (comics), a 2013–14 Marvel Comics crossover storyline

== See also ==
- Dehumanization, the denial of full humanness in others and the cruelty and suffering that accompanies it
- Inhuman (disambiguation)
