= Blackthorn (Russian band) =

Russian symphonic extreme metal band

- Origin: Moscow, Russia
- Genres: Symphonic black metal, extreme metal
- Years active: 2004-present
- Labels: Musica Production, MSR Productions, Ravenheart Music
- Members: Aina Blackthorn; Elvira Alchemida; Elena 'Less' Lesnykh; Tatyana 'Greta' Grevizirskaya; Acotath
- Past members: Lydia, Olga, Alexander Karpukhin, Verbena, Max, Freya, Aleksandra "Varaska" Arkhangelskaya

Blackthorn is a five-piece all-female Russian symphonic extreme metal band formed in 2004 in Moscow. As of 2017, they released three studio albums: Gossamer Witchcraft (2009), Codex Archaos (2011) and Witch Cult Ternion (2015).

== Band history ==
Blackthorn were formed in 2004, by the Sakha-born singer Aina. A year later the original line-up, featuring Aina, Verbena (bass guitar), Max (a blind from birth drummer), Lydia (guitars) and Olga (keyboards), entered the studio to record their 3-track demo, The Prologue of Eschaton. Mixed by the Israeli black metal band Arafel, it was released in February 2007. Two of its tracks later appeared in the "Metal World Compilation Vol.3".

Lydia left Blackthorn in 2007 after giving birth to a baby, to be replaced by Elvira Alchemida (guitars, keyboards, growling). With a new drummer Alexander Karpukhin and Freya on keyboards, the band recorded a 10-track debut album Gossamer Witchcraft, released by Ravenheart Music Records on 30 November 2009. In February 2010 its Russian version Araneum (Аранеум) came out via the Moscow-based Musica Production label. The record's digital version was released internationally by Hunter's Moon. In the course of the next two years the band toured Russia, Ukraine, Belarus and Estonia, and played at the Metal Heads Mission X and Metal Crowd festivals, in 2009 and 2011, respectively.

In 2010 the band, now with Varaska (Alexandra Archangelskaya) on drums, Greta (Tatyana Grevizirskaya) on bass and Less (Elena Lesnykh, ex-Shallow Rivers) on violin, entered the Magna Opera Studios to start to record their second album. Codex Archaos, "one of the most anticipated [female metal] releases of 2011," according to FemmeMetal, was released on 10 December 2011 by MSR Productions. Some of its tracks featured the Moscow Conservatory Silver Voice choir. The main lyrical idea behind the album was "an attempt to describe rituals of an ancient magic Codex Archaos," according to Aina.

External videos
- The Spectral Evildence official video. 2014

Witch Cult Ternion, a concept album, telling the "story of ancient triple goddesses, but interpret[ing] it in its own way, enfleshing the vision as three evil witch-sisters, reigning over the world with their dark powers," came out in December 2015. It drew comparisons with the early works of Cradle of Filth, as well as Epica, Dimmu Borgir and Lacrimosa, and "has finally brought the band into the Premiere league of Russian heavy music scene," according to one reviewer. After the release Varaska left the band to concentrate on her work with the Polish band Minetaur. She was replaced by Acotath (ex-Instorm, Khaos Labyrinth), who first appeared on the December 31, "Death of Love" single release. More concerts followed, including an appearance at the Metal Female Voices Fest in Belgium.

== Band members ==
=== Current line-up ===
- Aina – vocals (2004-present)
- Elvira Alchemida – vocals, guitars, keyboards (2007-present)
- Elena 'Less' Lesnykh – violin (2010-present)
- Tatyana 'Greta' Grevizirskaya – bass (2009-present)
- Acotath – drums (2015-present)

=== Past members ===
- Lydia – guitars (2004-2007)
- Olga – keyboards (2005-2007)
- Verbena – bass guitar (2005-2009)
- Max – drums (2007-2009)
- Freya – keyboards, backing vocals (2008-2010)
- Alexander Karpukhin – drums (2008-2010)
- Aleksandra 'Varaska' Arkhangelskaya – drums (2009-2015)

== Discography ==
=== Demo ===
- The Prologue of Eschaton (2007)

=== Studio albums ===
- Gossamer Witchcraft (2009; Russian version: Аранеум)
- Codex Archaos (2011)
- Witch Cult Ternion (2015)
- HEXSECRATUS (2025)

=== EPs ===
- Evocation (2023)

=== Singles ===
- Era Obscura (2012)
- Sister September (2013 - Anorexia Nervosa cover)
- Sonne (2012 - Rammstein cover)
