= Lebbeke =

- Municipality
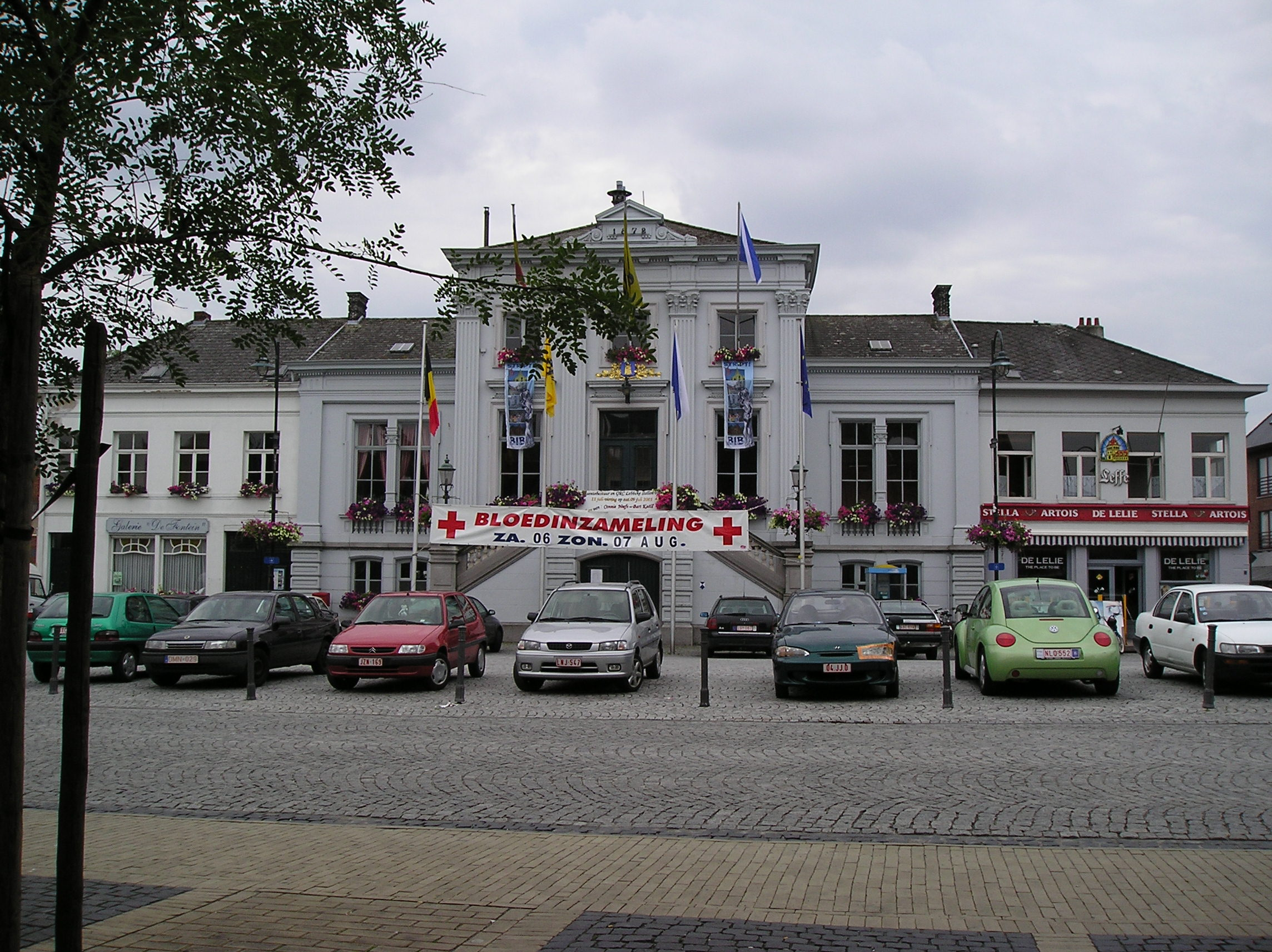
- Lebbeke town hall

- Flag Coat of arms

- Location of Lebbeke in East Flanders
- Interactive map of Lebbeke
- Location in Belgium
- Coordinates: 51°00′N 04°07′E
- Country: Belgium
- Community: Flemish Community
- Region: Flemish Region
- Province: East Flanders
- Arrondissement: Dendermonde

Government
  - Mayor: Jan Vanderstraeten (CD&V)
  - Governing parties: N-VA, CD&V, SP.A-Groen

Area
  - Total: 27.3 km^{2} (10.5 sq mi)

Population (2018-01-01)
  - Total: 19,195
  - Density: 703/km^{2} (1,820/sq mi)
- Postal codes: 9280
- NIS code: 42011
- Area codes: 052
- Website: www.lebbeke.be

Lebbeke (Dutch pronunciation: [ˈlɛbeːkə]) is a municipality located in the Belgian province of East Flanders in the Denderstreek. The municipality comprises the towns of Denderbelle, Lebbeke proper and Wieze. In 2021, Lebbeke had a total population of 19,560. The total area is 27.31 km². Lebbeke is home to the chocolate factory Callebaut.

== Events ==
Metal Female Voices Fest is a heavy metal music festival held annually in Belgium since 2003.

The Clay Cross in Lebbeke is a cyclo-cross race held in East Flanders.

The 2024 PDC Belgian Darts Open was held in Wieze.

== Notable inhabitants ==
- Jean-Marie Pfaff, soccer player, played 64 times for the Belgium national team and was born in Lebbeke. He now lives in Brasschaat.
- Frank Vandenbroucke, international cyclist, lived in Lebbeke for several years during his marriage to Sarah Pinacci (2000)
