= Lahannya =

British singer

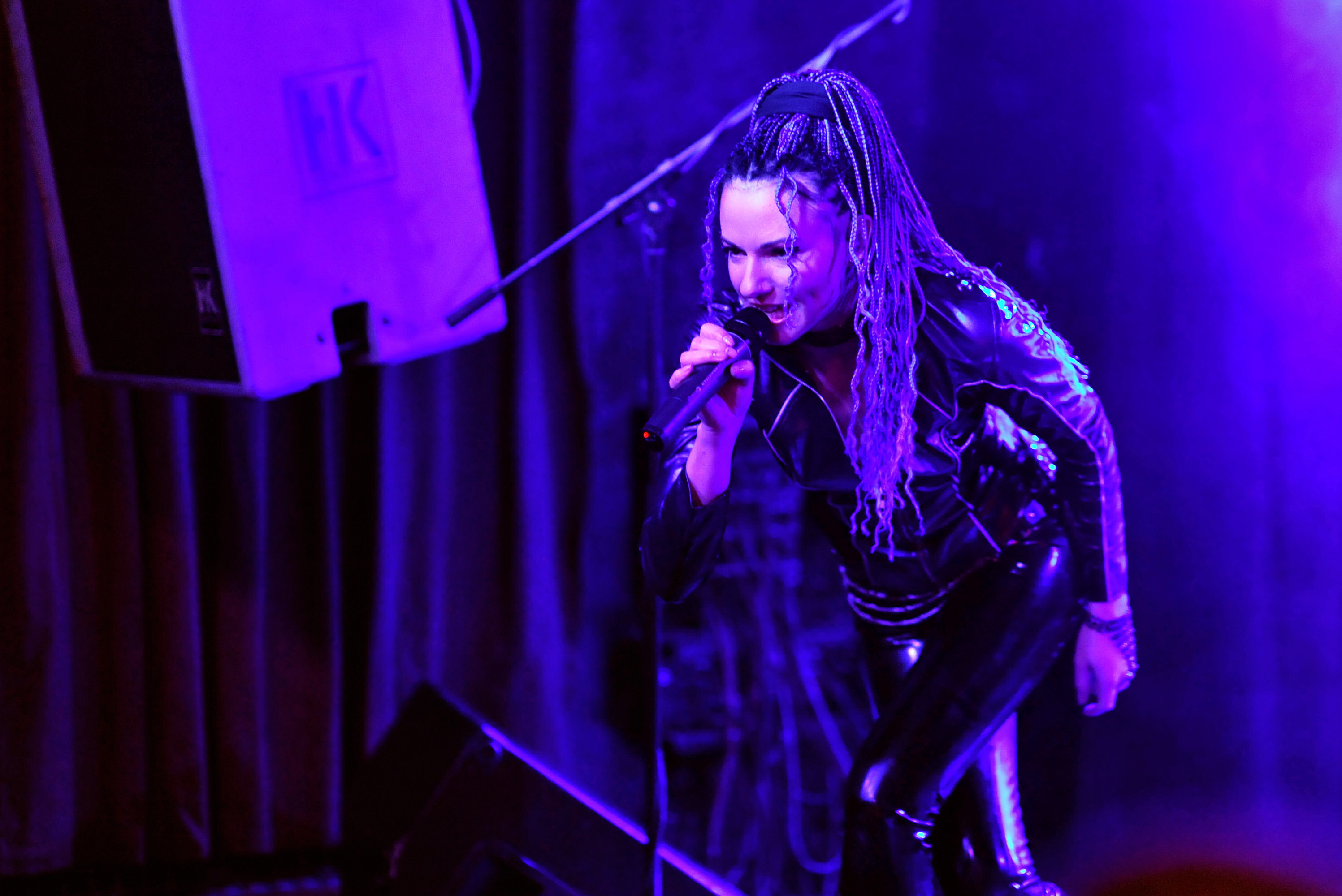

Background information
- Origin: United Kingdom/Germany
- Genres: Alternative rock, heavy metal, electronica
- Years active: 1998–2013
- Label: Kabuki
- Members: Lahannya; Lutz Demmler; Christopher Milden; Luca Mazzucconi
- Past members: Belle
- Website: Lahannya.com

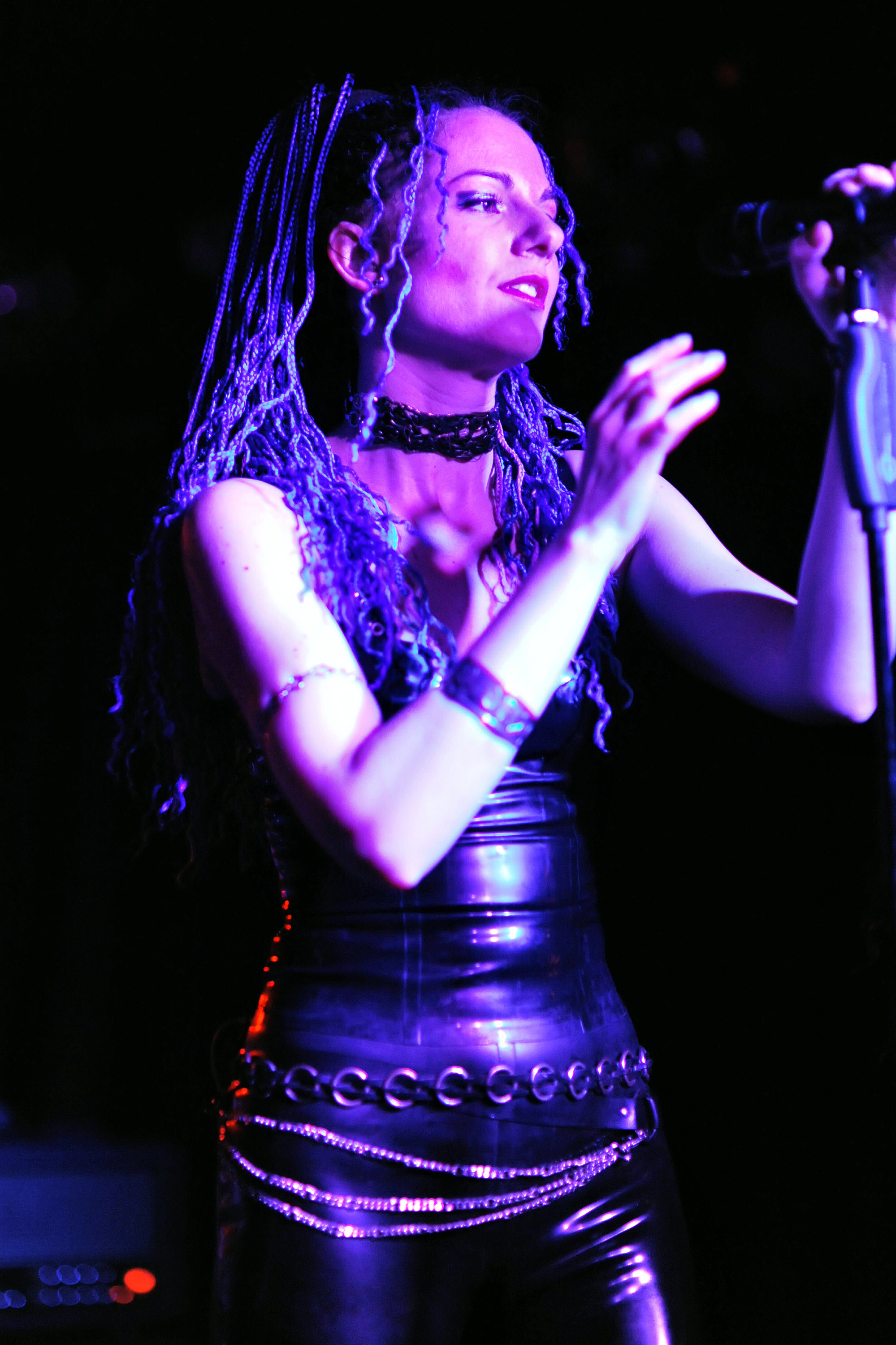
6. Dec 2009, MarX (Markthalle), Hamburg Germany

Lahannya is former English singer, songwriter and performer. She was the vocalist and front woman of her own band with Lutz Demmler as co-songwriter, producer and bass player. Lahannya and Lutz are complemented live by Christopher Milden and Luca Mazzucconi.

Lahannya music is associated with the dark alternative scene for her collaborations with Soman, Greenhaus, Xotox and Dracul with whom she performed many gigs and festivals including M'Era Luna and Wave-Gotik-Treffen. In the early 2000s Lahannya occasionally DJed at the London alternative club Slimelight.

== History ==
Lahannya's first release came by complete chance after the US underground label, Zenflesh, came across a demo of her first track, "Drowning". They persuaded her to go ahead and record a full version of it for their forthcoming compilation album, Amduscias. The feedback inspired her to write an EP.

After many collaborations with numerous acts, such as Greenhaus and Soman, Lahannya came into contact with Umbra Et Imago bassist Lutz Demmler at the M'Era Luna Festival in 2004. This quickly developed into a friendship and collaboration. A couple of brief line-up changes, towards the end of 2006 the duo came into contact with ex Killing Miranda drummer Belle, and NFD guitarist Chris Milden. The band now set about writing and recording their debut album, Shotgun Reality. Upon completion they secured support slots with Emilie Autumn and Moon Kana.

After the release of Shotgun Reality, Lahannya worked on a concept EP as the build up to the band's second album. Upon completion of the EP, Lahannya supported German goth rock band ASP on a three-week Germany tour. ASP also contributed a remix of the track "Inside the Machine" to the Welcome to the Underground EP. Two UK tours followed including a performance at the open air amphitheatre Parkbuehne as part of the four day Wave Gotik Treffen music festival, in Leipzig, Germany.

The band then released their second album, Defiance, on 19 October 2009. Scavenger was released in November 2010 – a stop gap release mixing two new songs and a live DVD from the MFVF 2009. Dystopia was released in October 2011 – 12 tracks featuring the previously released Scavenger. This was promoted via numerous UK live dates in autumn 2011 with supporting acts including Pythia.

Sojourn was released in November 2013 – A three disc set, 1 DVD 2 CD. The DVD featuring Live at M'Era Luna August 2012 and Live at Metal Voices Fest (2012), a CD of the same shows and a CD of collaborations. The album was launched with a small UK tour with shows in Cambridge, London and Sheffield.

== Members ==
- Lahannya – songwriting / vocalist
- Lutz Demmler – songwriting / bass
- Christopher Milden – guitar
- Luca Mazzucconi – drums

== Discography ==
=== Albums ===
- 2007: Shotgun Reality
- 2009: Defiance
- 2011: Dystopia

=== EPs ===
- 2000: Drowning EP
- 2008: Welcome to the Underground EP
- 2010: Scavenger

=== Live albums ===
- 2013: Sojourn

=== Singles ===
- 2007: "Bleed For Me"

=== Compilation albums ===
- 1998: Amduscias – Various Artists (Zenflesh Records); contributed the track 'Drowning' to this compilation

=== Collaborations ===
- 2003: Another Life – Greenhaus (Future Recordings); co-songwriter and vocalist on over half of the tracks on the album
- 2004: Revenge – Soman (Out of Line Music); co-songwritier and vocalist for the track Tears feat. Lahannya
- 2004: Machineries of Joy – Various Artists (Out of Line Music); co-songwriter and vocalist for the track Antique by Soman
- 2004: Sex, Drogen Und Industrial – Combichrist (Out of Line Music); spoken sample for the Soman remix of the title track Sex, Drugs & Industrial
- 2005: [psi] (2 cd version) – Xotox (Pronoize); spoken intro for the included video of the track [psi]
- 2006: Harmonia Mundi – Various Artists (Danse Macabre); co-songwriter and vocalist for the track My Angel by Wintry
- 2006: Like an Animal – Dracul (Spirit Production); co-songwriter and vocalist for the tracks Vampiria's Dream and Deathwish
- 2007: Mask – Soman (Infacted); co-songwriter and vocalist for the tracks Mask and Eye to Eye
- 2007: Nie Mehr – ASP (Trisol); remix of the title track Nie Mehr
- 2008: In Den Zehn Morgen – Xotox (Pronoize); vocalist for the track Habitat
- 2010 : Noistyle – Soman Skin Deep feat. Lahannya
