= Dark Princess (band) =

Russian band

- Origin: Moscow, Russia
- Genres: Gothic metal, Gothic rock, Symphonic Metal
- Years active: 2004–2014, 2020–present
- Members: Stanislav Fatyanov; Kirill Fyodorov; Ilya Klokov; Aleksander Lyubimov; Natalia Terekhova; Stepan Zujev
- Past members: Olga Romanova; Denis Stekanov
- Website: darkprincess.ru

Dark Princess is a Russian gothic metal band from Moscow that was formed in 2004. The band has received several awards in Russia and has been successful in the Russian music charts.

== History ==
The band was founded by singer Olga "Dark Princess" Romanova.

Its debut album Without You was released in 2005.

In 2006, Dark Princess released a full-length album titled Stop My Heart. A 2008 review by the German Sonic Seducer magazine noted similarities to bands like Evanescence but also original creativity, and praised Olga Romanova's singing as "remarkably competent". In 2007, the band released its third album, The Brutal Game.

In 2008, a double CD was included in the heavy-metal magazine EMP that consisted of the band's first two albums, Without You and Stop My Heart. In February 2008, Romanova, citing personal and organizational problems, left the band and was replaced by Natalia Terekhova. In April 2012, the band released a new album, The World I've Lost. After the release of this album, longtime drummer Denis Stekanov (also known as Ghost) left the band for unknown reasons.

In 2014, the band Dark Princess broke up.

In 2020, Olga Trifonova (ex-Romanova) regained the Dark Princess brand and in the summer of 2020, she began working on the new album "Phoenix," which was completed in 2023.

== Band members ==
=== Current members ===
- Olga Trifonova – lead vocals (2004–2008, 2020–present)
- Stepan Zujev – keyboards, backing vocals (2005–2014, 2020–present)
- Sergey Moroz – drums (2020–present)
- Denis Nikulshin – bass guitar (2020–present)
- Andrey Lavrov – guitar (2020–present)
- Maxim Demidov – guitar (2020–present)

=== Past members ===
- Ilya Klokov – lead guitar (2004–2014)
- Aleksandr Lubimov – rhythm guitar, backing vocals (2004–2014)
- Stanislav Fatyanov – bass guitar (2004–2014)
- Denis Stekanov – drums (2004–2012)
- Natalia Terekhova – lead vocals (2008–2014)
- Kirill Fyodorov – drums (2012–2014)

== Discography ==
- Without You (2005)
- Stop My Heart (2006) – Metal Hammer: 5/7
- Zhestokaya Igra (Жестокая игра; English: The Rude Game) (2007)
- The World I've Lost (2012) – Rock Hard: 7.5/10
- Phoenix (2023)

== See also ==
- List of gothic-metal bands
- Music of Russia
