= InHuman =

- Origin: Belgium
- Genres: Melodic death metal Symphonic metal Progressive metal
- Years active: 2007–present
- Labels: M&O Music
- Members: Astrid Kaiserman; Julien "Jukka" Huyssens; Eline Van De Putte; Yūki Koichi Takano; Eerik Maurage; Romain Caudron; Dietwin Elbers
- Past members: see below
- Website: https://inhumanmetal.com/

InHuman, originally known as Anwynn, is a Belgian heavy metal band that formed in 2007. Their sound has been described as melodic death metal, symphonic metal, and progressive metal. The band changed its name to InHuman in 2020 and released their most recent album in 2021.

== History ==
The band formed in 2007 under name Anwynn, after the Annwn location in Welsh mythology. No members of the band have been present through its entire history, and the last original member, bassist Vincent "Wobi" Van Loo, departed in 2020. Since their inception they have featured two singers, with a female singer to deliver operatic vocals as a counterpoint to the death metal vocals of a male singer. As Anwynn they released two early demos, and until 2012 the band experienced frequent lineup changes. They released the full-length album Forbidden Songs in 2012, which earned some positive reviews in the European rock press, and was supported by a high-profile appearance at the Metal Female Voices Festival. This was followed by the EP Swords & Blood in 2015.

In 2020, Van Loo and two other longtime members left the band and four new members joined, resulting in a septet with singers Dietwin Elbers and Eline Van De Putte, guitarists Eerik Maurage and Romain Caudron, bassist Julien "Jukka" Huyssens, keyboardist Astrid Kaiserman, and drummer Yūki Koichi Takano. The band changed its name to InHuman, and released a self-titled album under that name in February 2021.

== Discography ==
=== as Anwynn ===
- Behind the Veil (demo, 2008)
- Newydd Wawr (demo, 2010)
- Forbidden Songs (2012)
- Swords & Blood (EP, 2015)

=== as InHuman ===
- InHuman (2021)

== Band members ==
Current members

- Astrid Kaiserman - keyboards (2009–present)
- Eline Van De Putte – vocals (2013–present)
- Yūki Koichi Takano - drums (2020–present)
- Eerik Maurage - guitar (2020–present)
- Romain Caudron - guitar (2020–present)
- Dietwin Elbers - vocals (2020–present)

Former members

- Julien "Jukka" Huyssens – guitar (2011–2018), bass (2020-2022)
- Vincent "Wobi" Van Loo – bass (2007–2020)
- Amandine Blanquet – vocals (2007–2013)
- Laurent "Wallace" Hunaerts - guitar (2007–2013)
- Mathias Lautour - guitar (2007–2008)
- Frédéric Rochet - drums (2007–2008)
- Vladimir - keyboards (2008–2009)
- Forster Perelsztejn – drums (2009–2010)
- Benoît Becker - guitar (2010–2011)
- Laurent Verheylewegen - drums (2010–2011)
- Dereck Roy - drums (2011)
- Olivier Wittenberg – drums (2012)
- Florent "Flush" Boudry – drums (2012–2020)
- Vincent "McBouc" Carton – vocals (2009–2020)
