= Diabulus in Musica =

Spanish symphonic metal band

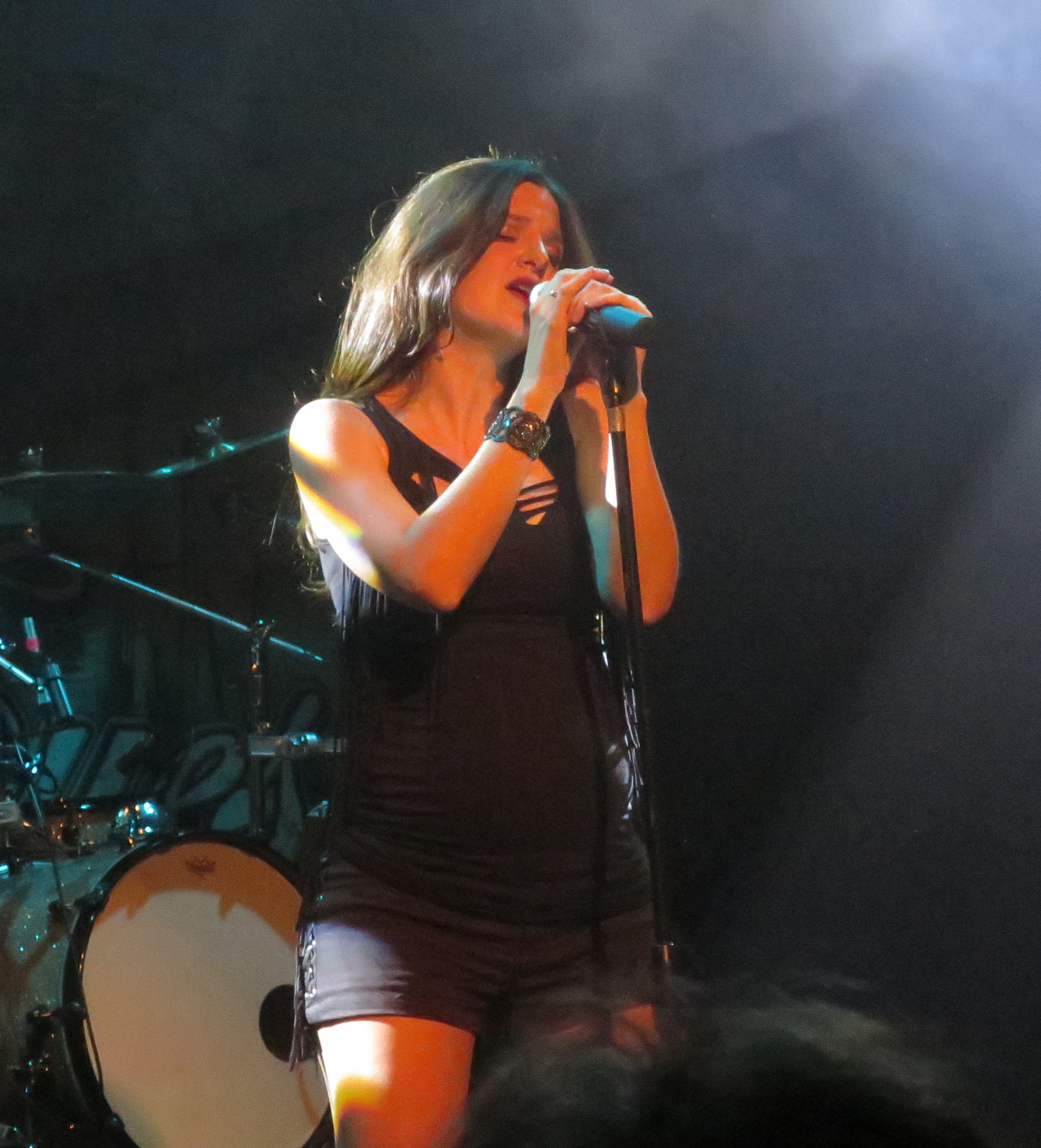
- Zuberoa Aznárez performing with Diabulus In Musica in London in 2015

Background information
- Origin: Pamplona, Navarra; Spain
- Genres: Symphonic metal Gothic metal
- Years active: 2006−present
- Labels: Metal Blade Records; Napalm Records
- Members: Zuberoa Aznárez; Gorka Elso; Ion Feligreras; David Erro; Aimar Ibarzabal
- Past members: Jorge Arca; Santi Fernandez Ramos; Javier De La Casa; Adrián M. Vallejo; Xabier Jareño; Alejandro "Alex" Sanz; Odei Ochoa; David Carrica; Alexey Kolygin
- Website: Official website

Diabulus in Musica is a Spanish symphonic metal band, formed in 2006.

== History ==
=== Early years and Secrets ===
The band was formed in Pamplona, Navarre in 2006 by Zuberoa Aznárez, Gorka Elso, Adrián Vallejo and Jorge Arca. Lead singer Zuberoa said in an interview with Sonic Cathedral WebZine that the main reason she founded Diabulus in Musica is because she needed an outlet for developing her own musical ideas. Xabier Jareño and Álex Sanz joined the band throughout the next few years. During the time Diabulus in Musica was recording some own tracks, which ones they won some battles of bands and some fame in Pamplona with. In 2009, the band released their first EP "Secrets" with the best tracks they recorded before. Those tracks and the name of the demo were included in their first full-length album Secrets.

Secrets was released on May 21, 2010, by the label Metal Blade Records. The album was mixed by Ad Sluijter and mastered by Sascha Paeth. In a review of this album, the German edition of Metal Hammer wrote that singer Zuberoa Aznárez was the band's strongest asset but the author criticized a lack in songwriting and an unclear mix of different styles.

=== The Wanderer ===
In the end of February 2012, the band released their second full-length album The Wanderer, this time by the label Napalm Records. A review by the German Sonic Seducer magazine compared the album to Mother Earth by Within Temptation and lauded the balance of classically inspired tracks and harsh metal songs.

Guest appearances on the album are from American guitarist John Kelly (Antietam 1862, Arbiter of Conceit), Dutch guitarist/vocalist Mark Jansen (ex-After Forever, Epica, MaYaN) and Spanish vocalist Maite Itoiz.

=== Change in line-up and Argia ===
In late 2012, Adrián M. Vallejo, Xabier Jareño and Alejandro Sanz left the band, and were replaced in early 2013 by Alexey Kolygin, David Carrica and Odei Ochoa in their respective roles.

In 2013, the new band line-up began work on the third album for the band, entitled Argia, meaning "light or clear" in Basque. It was released on 11 April 2014 by Napalm Records in Europe and on 15 April in America.

The album has so far received positive reviews - Ton Dekkers of Sonic Cathedral Webzine giving the album a 9.25/10 score, while Bart Schaaphok of Albumfeeds gave the album a 9.5/10 rating and noted that "Diabulus In Musica have brought out a jewel with this album". Matt Mason of Ave Noctum gave the album a 7/10 score, and noted that there were "Bright things afoot for these guys". Nick Webb from All About The Rock said "The album has a good balance with the way that the songs are written, amalgamating the different styles together with ease".

== Line-up ==
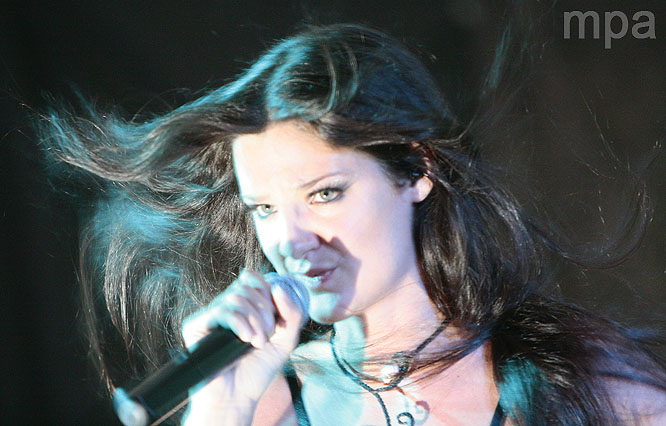
Zuberoa Aznárez

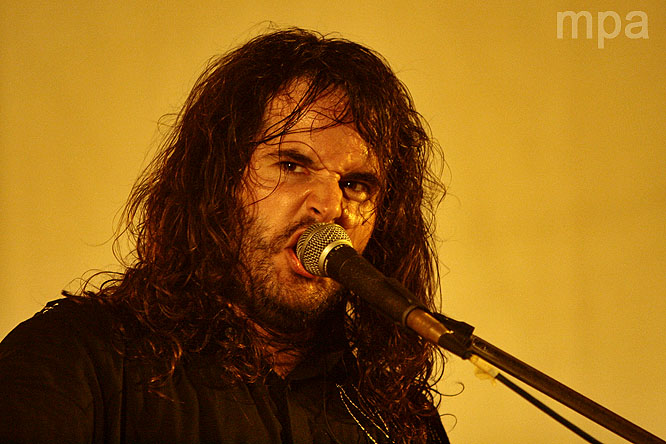
Gorka Elso

=== Current members ===
- Zuberoa Aznárez - mezzo-soprano vocals, flute, baroque flute, whistle, harp, programming, samples (2006–present)
- Gorka Elso - keyboards, samples, programming, grunts (2006–present)
- Ion Feligreras - drums (2021–present)
- David Erro - bass (2021–present)
- Aimar Ibarzabal - guitars (2022–present)

=== Former members ===
- Jorge Arca - bass (2006-2008)
- Santi Fernandez Ramos - drums (2006-2008)
- Javier De La Casa - bass (2008-2009)
- Alejandro "Alex" Sanz - bass (2010-2012)
- Adrián M. Vallejo - guitars, harsh vocals (2006-2012)
- Xabier Jareño - drums (2009-2012)
- Odei Ochoa - bass (2013-2017)
- David Carrica - drums (2013-2021)
- Alexey Kolygin - guitars, backing vocals (2013-2022)

Timeline

== Discography ==
=== Studio albums ===
- 2010: Secrets (Metal Blade Records)
- 2012: The Wanderer (Napalm Records)
- 2014: Argia (Napalm Records)
- 2016: Dirge for the Archons (Napalm Records)
- 2020: Euphonic Entropy (Napalm Records)

=== Singles and EPs ===
- 2009: Secrets (EP)
- 2012: Sceneries of Hope (single)
- 2014: Inner Force (single)
- 2016: Crimson Gale (single)
- 2016: Invisible (single)
- 2019: Otoi (single)

=== Music videos ===
- 2012: Sceneries of Hope
- 2014: Inner Force
- 2015: Spoilt Vampire
- 2016: Crimson Gale (lyric video)
- 2016: Invisible
- 2019: Otoi
- 2020: The Misfit's Swing (lyric video)

=== Projects ===
- 2012: Music for Itzalen Sua - El Fuego de las Sombras (DVD)
