= Atargatis (band) =

German heavy metal band

- Origin: Regensburg, Germany
- Genres: Symphonic metal; gothic metal
- Years active: 1997–2007
- Labels: Massacre Records
- Members: Stephanie Luzie; Artur Vladinovskij; Lord Lornhold; Tialupa; Shadrak
- Past members: Sagoth; Satyria; Azmo
- Website: https://web.archive.org/web/20070221181914/http://www.atargatis.de/

Atargatis is a German heavy metal band, formed in Regensburg in 1997.

== Name ==
Atargatis is the name of the Syrian goddess of fertility and motherhood.

== Members ==
=== Current line-Up ===
- Stephanie Luzie – vocals
- Artur Vladinovskij - guitar
- Lord Lornhold – bass, backing vocals
- Tialupa - violin
- Shadrak – drums

=== Former members ===
- Maximilian Schulz – guitar (2008–2009)
- Ernst Wurdack (Azmo) – guitar (2005–2008)
- Florian Ramsauer (Sagoth) – guitar
- Margit (Satyria) – keyboards
- Martin Buchmann – guitar

== Discography ==
=== Studio albums ===
- Wasteland (2006)
- Nova (2007)

=== EPs ===
- Alba Gebraich (EP, 1999)
- Divine Awakening (EP, 2004)

=== Demo ===
- Accurst from the Deep (EP, 2002)
