= Macbeth (band) =

Italian gothic metal band

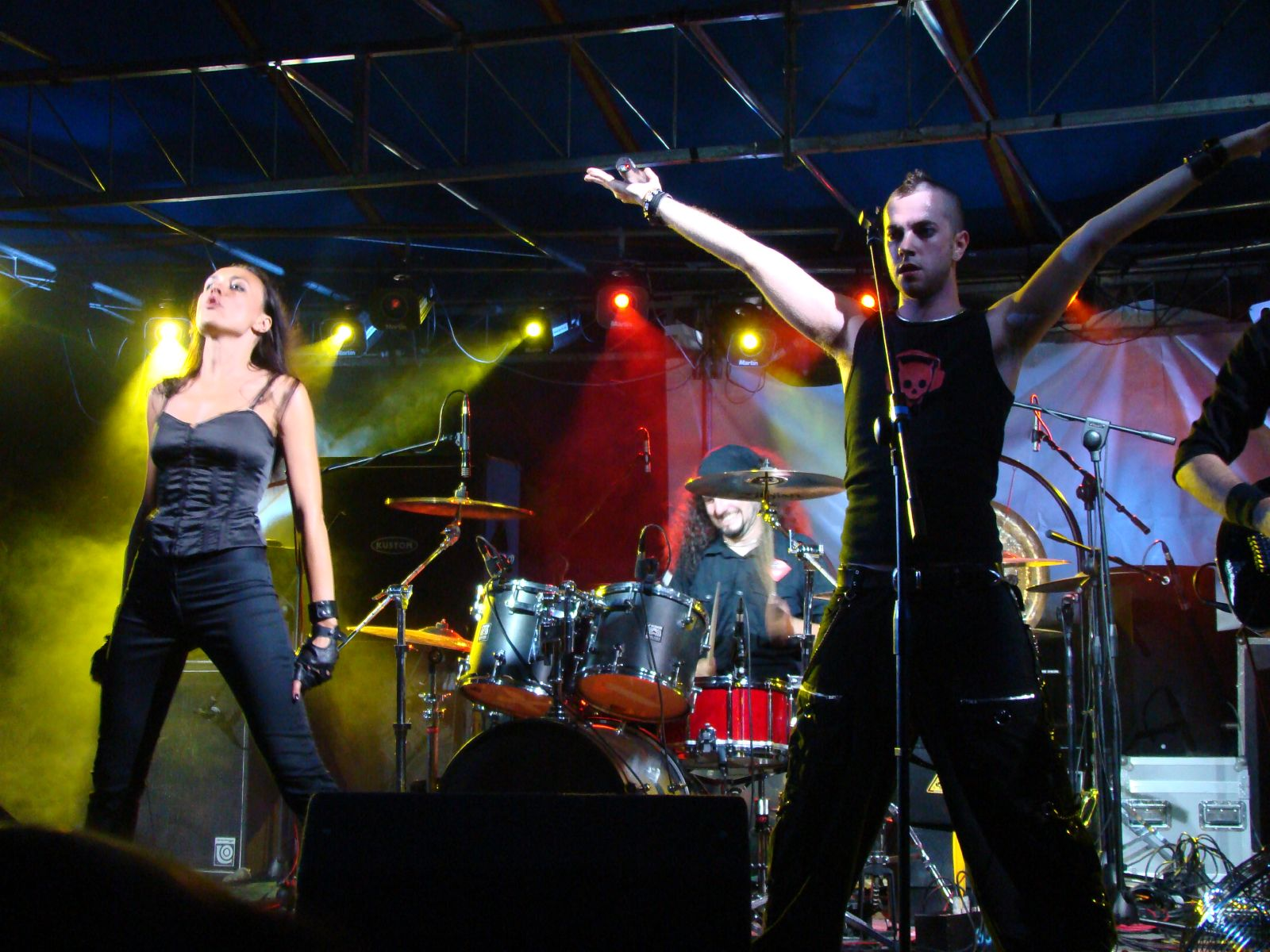
- Macbeth in 2007.

Background information
- Origin: Milan, Italy
- Genres: Gothic metal
- Years active: 1995–present
- Labels: Dragonheart Records
- Members: Morena Rozzi; Andreas Cislaghi; Fabrizio Cislaghi; Max Montagano; Marco "Sem" Semenza
- Website: www.macbeth.it

Macbeth is an Italian gothic metal band in the international music scene. The group was founded in 1995 by drummer Fabrizio Cislaghi.

== History ==
Formerly known as Land of Dark Souls, the band was inspired by the combination of gothic imagery and music, and the members have been known for contrasting dual female/male vocals.

Founded in 1995 by drummer Fabrizio Cislaghi, the group debuted in 1997 releasing Nocturnal Embrace, a demo tape in a limited numbered copies.

In 1998, Macbeth signed a recording contract with Dragonheart Records, a division of Audioglobe, and released their first album Romantic Tragedy's Crescendo. The album was a success, receiving rave reviews throughout Europe, and was regarded as one of the best symphonic gothic metal albums of the year.

After a promotional tour and a few changes in the line-up, Macbeth entered the studio to record their second work Vanitas, which was released in 2001. The album showed a more aggressive approach without losing that trademark melodic side of the band.

A further leap was made with the release of Malae Artes in 2005. The third album, recorded by a renewed line-up, was released in Mexico, Russia, Taiwan, Baltic countries and the United States. The promotional tour took the band from Europe to South America and in the major cities of Mexico. In 2006, Macbeth performed in Beirut, headlining the Rock Nation festival. Singer Morena guested on the musical project Rezophonic along with many artists of the Italian rock scene, and worked as host in the Morning Glory and Database programs on Rock TV channel.

In 2007, the band released Superangelic Hate Bringers containing the single "Without You", and the promotional video reaches over 500,000 plays on YouTube. Superangelic Hate Bringers was the most direct of Macbeth's album with a truly great production. The British magazine Classic Rock published a rave review in December of the same year, which raised interest around the band.

In 2008, Macbeth went to England for a tour for the first time and returned to Belgium for the sixth edition of the Metal Female Voices Fest. The same year the singer Morena participated as a guest at the March Metal Day Festival in Athens. The song "Don't Pretend" from Superangelic Hate Bringers was used by Sky Sports throughout the 2008 FIA Formula One World Championship.

While already at work on new album in 2009, the band was forced to take a long break due to personal problems, but the long gestation allowed the group to prepare a new album with superior qualities.

Macbeth had set Neo-Gothic Propaganda as the title of their fifth studio album. The new sound combined a wide range of influences and is heavier, dynamic and more melodic. Neo-Gothic Propaganda was made up of ten brand new melodic and heavy songs and mixed gothic atmospheres into music that does not fit into any categories. Neo-Gothic Propaganda is a manifesto, is a movement, is the soundtrack of contemporary decadence. Neo-Gothic Propaganda was released on February 24, 2014. "Scent of Winter" is the first single and video released from the album.

== Discography ==
=== Studio albums ===
- Romantic Tragedy's Crescendo (1998)
- Vanitas (2001)
- Malae Artes (2005)
- Superangelic Hate Bringers (2007)
- Neo-Gothic Propaganda (2014)

=== EPs ===
- Nocturnal Embrace (demo) (1997)

== Members ==
Current Members

- Morena Rozzi – female vocals (2000-present)
- Andreas Cislaghi – male vocals (2000-present)
- Fabrizio Cislaghi – drums, backing vocals (1996-present)
- Max Montagano – lead guitar (2002-present)
- Marco "Sem" Semenza – bass guitar (2000-present)

Previous Members

- Vittorio – male vocals (1995–1998)
- Alex – lead guitar (1995-2001)
- Fabio – bass guitar (1995-1996)
- Monica – keyboards (1995-1996)
- Cristina – female vocals (1996–1998)
- Jessica – female vocals (1999)
- Andrea – piano/keyboards (1996–2003)
- Luca Sassi – rhythm guitar (1995–2005)
- Carlo – keyboards (2003-2006)
