= Asrai (band) =

Dutch band

- Origin: Netherlands
- Genres: Gothic metal, gothic rock
- Years active: 1988 - present
- Labels: Season Of Mist
- Members: Margriet Mol; Manon van der Hidde; Karin Mol; Jacqui Taylor
- Past members: Bert Rosenbrand; Elfriede de Vries; Jett Dadswell; Martin Kooy; Rik Janssen
- Website: http://www.asrai.net/

Asrai is a band from Schiedam, Netherlands. Their music is mostly on the border between gothic and metal genres.

== History ==
The band was founded by the twin sisters Karin and Margriet in the raw underground scene of Rotterdam in 1985 and changed their name in 1988 to Asrai. Several of its members played in various punk and new-wave bands. At that time their music already had a melancholic dark side.

Asrai released several demo-tapes from 1989 to 1994 ("the Blue tape", "So clear that you couldn't tell where the water ended and the air began", "Love is a Lie", "Live in a package"). Finally in 1997 they released their debut CD, As Voices Speak. This CD was noticed and signed to the label Poison Ivy. On this label a German release of As voices speak was issued.

Asrai contracted by Transmission Records, recorded their second CD Touch in the Dark. Roman Schoensee produced this CD while Sascha Paeth mixed it. The CD was recorded in both Holland (Excess Studio) and Germany (Beautiful Lake Studio).

On 26 May 2004, the album Touch in the Dark was released in most European countries as well as in Asia and North and South America. The single "Pale Light" was released 6 May. The video-clip for their single was made by the duo Marcel de Jong and Jelle Swetter. Their second single from the album Touch in the Dark ("In front of me") was released on 23 September. Again the videoclip was made by Marcel de Jong and Jelle Swetter, in addition to Maud Mulder.

In December 2006, metal and rock label Season of Mist proudly announced the signing of Asrai. Asrai's third album, Pearls in Dirt was released on 12 November 2007 (20 November in the U.S.), and the first single, "Sour Ground", was released on 5 November. A European tour followed.

Asrai released their EP Between Dreams and Destiny on 20 August 2013 independently. It was recorded by Hans Pieters and produced by Sascha Peath, and produced the single "All seems so Hollow". Former guitarist, Jos from Grendel, remixed the song, "Stone Cold".

After 30 years Asrai released their anniversary album Hourglass, a collection of special songs, remixes etc. including "Something you Did" remixed by Hans Pieters, featuring Jacqui Taylor on guitar.

On 5 November Asrai released their digital EP Shattered Time, with the Dead can Dance tribute, "Anywhere out of the World". It was recorded and produced by Hans Pieters and Asrai.

== Band members ==
- Margriet Mol - vocals
- Manon van der Hidde - synth
- Jacqui Taylor - guitar
- Karin Mol - drums

== Discography ==
=== Tapes ===
- The Blue Tape
- So Clear that You Couldn't Tell Where the Water Ended and the Air Began
- Love is a Lie
- Live in a Package
- Asrai

=== Studio albums ===
- 1997: As Voices Speak
- 2004: Touch in the Dark
- 2007: Pearls in Dirt
- 2017: Hourglass

=== EP's ===
- 2013: Between Dreams and Destiny
- 2020: Shattered Time

=== Singles & videoclips ===
- Pale Light
- In Front of Me
- Sour Ground
- All seems so Hollow
- Something you did
- Anywhere out of the world - Dead can Dance Tribute

=== Collaborations ===
- Amanda Somerville - lyrical editor on Touch in the Dark (2004) and Pearls in Dirt (2007)
