= Darkwell =

Austrian gothic metal band

- Origin: Innsbruck, Austria
- Genre: Gothic metal
- Years active: 1999—present
- Label: Napalm Records
- Members: Mathias Nussbaum; Moritz Neuner; Raphael Lepuschitz; Roland Wurzer
- Past members: Stephanie Luzie; Alexandra Pittracher; Christian Filip; Roman Wienicke

Darkwell is a gothic metal band from Innsbruck, Austria.

== History ==
Formed in 1999 by bassist Roland Wurzer and guitarist Roman Wienicke; Wurzer is the sole founding member still active with the group. Soon after formation, they signed with Napalm Records and released their first album, Suspiria, in 2000. Before the release of Conflict of Interest in 2002 they toured across Europe with Tristania, The Sins of Thy Beloved, Graveworm, and Vintersorg. Supporting their second full-length album, Metatron, they again toured across Europe, with Atrocity, Leaves' Eyes, and Battlelore. The album received a 4.5 rating from AllMusic, whose reviewer Stewart Mason noted, "This might not endear them to the more hardcore metalheads in their audience, but surprisingly, the lighter and more pop-oriented sound of Metatron sounds better and more original than either of Darkwell's previous albums, and it suggests a creative path the group would do well to explore further."

== Line-up ==
=== Current line-up ===
- Alexandra Pittracher - vocals
- Mathias Nussbaum - guitar
- Moritz Neuner - drums
- Raphael Lepuschitz - keyboard
- Roland Wurzer - bass guitar

=== Former members ===
- Stephanie Luzie (Meier) - vocals
- Christian Filip - keyboard
- Roman Wienicke - guitar (Founding member)

== Discography ==
=== Studio albums ===
- Suspiria (2000)
- Metatron (2004)
- Moloch (2016)

=== EPs ===
- Conflict of Interest (2002)

=== Singles ===
- "Strange" (2004)

=== Videos ===
- "The Crucible" (2003)
- "Fate Prisoner" (2004)
