= ASP (band) =

German rock band

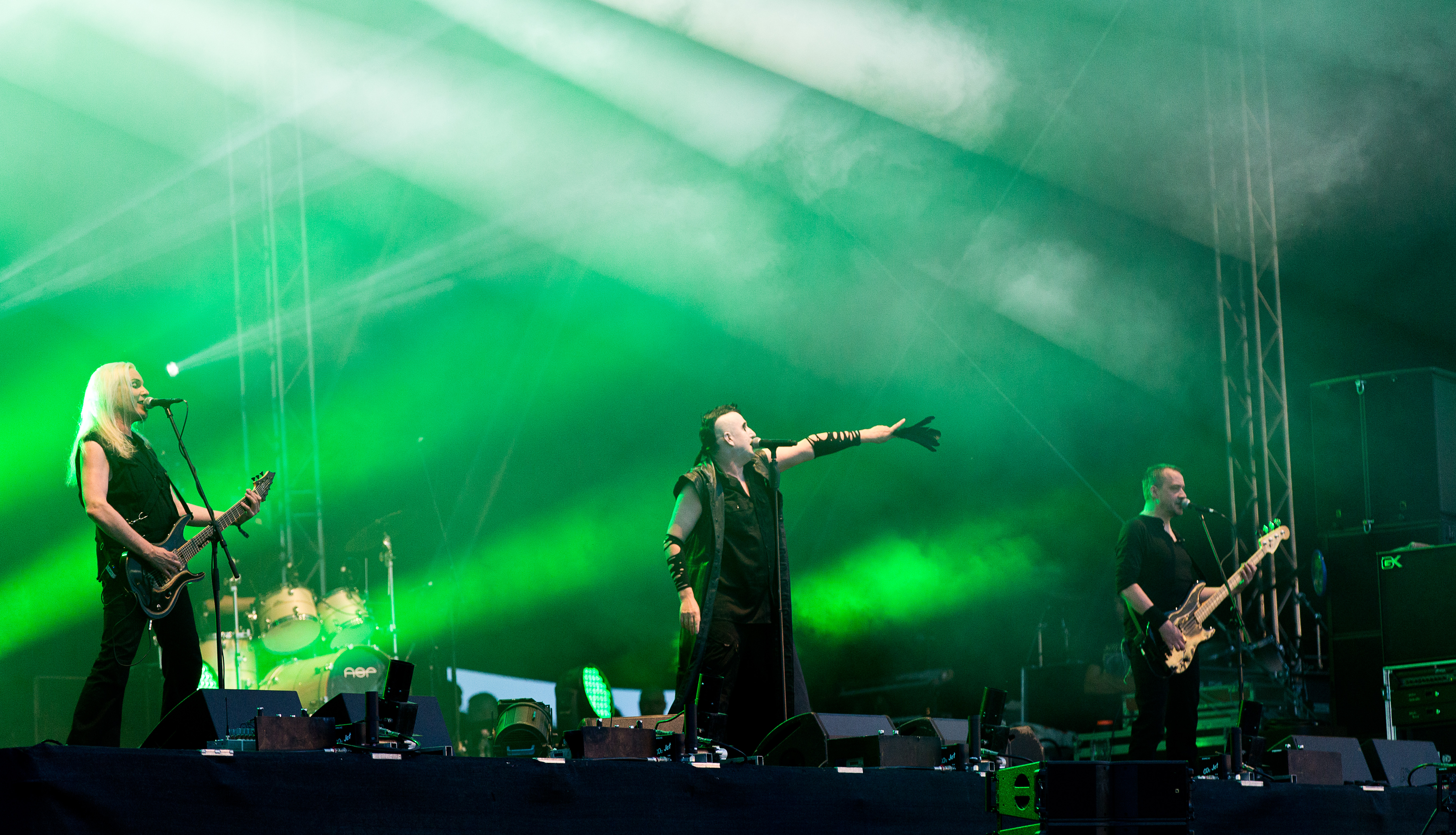
- ASP at Rockharz Open Air 2016

Background information
- Origin: Frankfurt, Germany
- Genres: Industrial rock; Neue Deutsche Härte; gothic metal; gothic rock; dark wave; folk rock
- Years active: 1999–present
- Label: Trisol
- Members: Asp (Alexander Frank Spreng); Lias (Tobias Engel); Lutz Demmler; Sören Jordan; Stefan Günther
- Past members: Matze (Matthias Ambré); Tossi (Andreas Gross); Max (Marcus Testory); Holger Hartgen; Pit Hammann; Himmi (Oliver Himmighoffen)
- Website: aspswelten.de

ASP is a German rock band from Frankfurt, formed in 1999. The name is identical to the pseudonym of the band's leader Asp (Alexander Spreng), and is pronounced as one word (like the snake).

== History ==
ASP were formed in 1999 by Alexander Frank Spreng (a.k.a. "Asp") and Matthias Ambré (a.k.a. "Matze"), producing their first 3-track demo CD later that year. The following year saw a record deal with Trisol, who released the band's debut album Hast du mich vermisst? ("Have you missed me [very much]?"), as well as the band's first live performance, at the 'Gothicworld' festival having added Andreas Gross (a.k.a. "Tossi") on bass, Oliver Himmighoffen (a.k.a. "Himmi") on drums and a choir section to the line-up.

The following three years saw the release of two further albums Duett and Weltunter, which, along with the debut, formed the album series Der Schwarze Schmetterling ("The Black Butterfly"). ASP also became a popular live act over these years, regularly appearing at high-profile festivals.

The band suffered some difficulty in 2004 with the bankruptcy of distributor EFA, though their albums were reissued later that year, along with the Interim Works Compendium, a 2CD collection of ASP rarities as well as selected tracks from their three albums to date. Another string of live dates took them through to the release of Aus der Tiefe in May 2005, the fourth part of the Der Schwarze Schmetterling series. The fifth part Requiembryo followed in 2007.

== Members ==
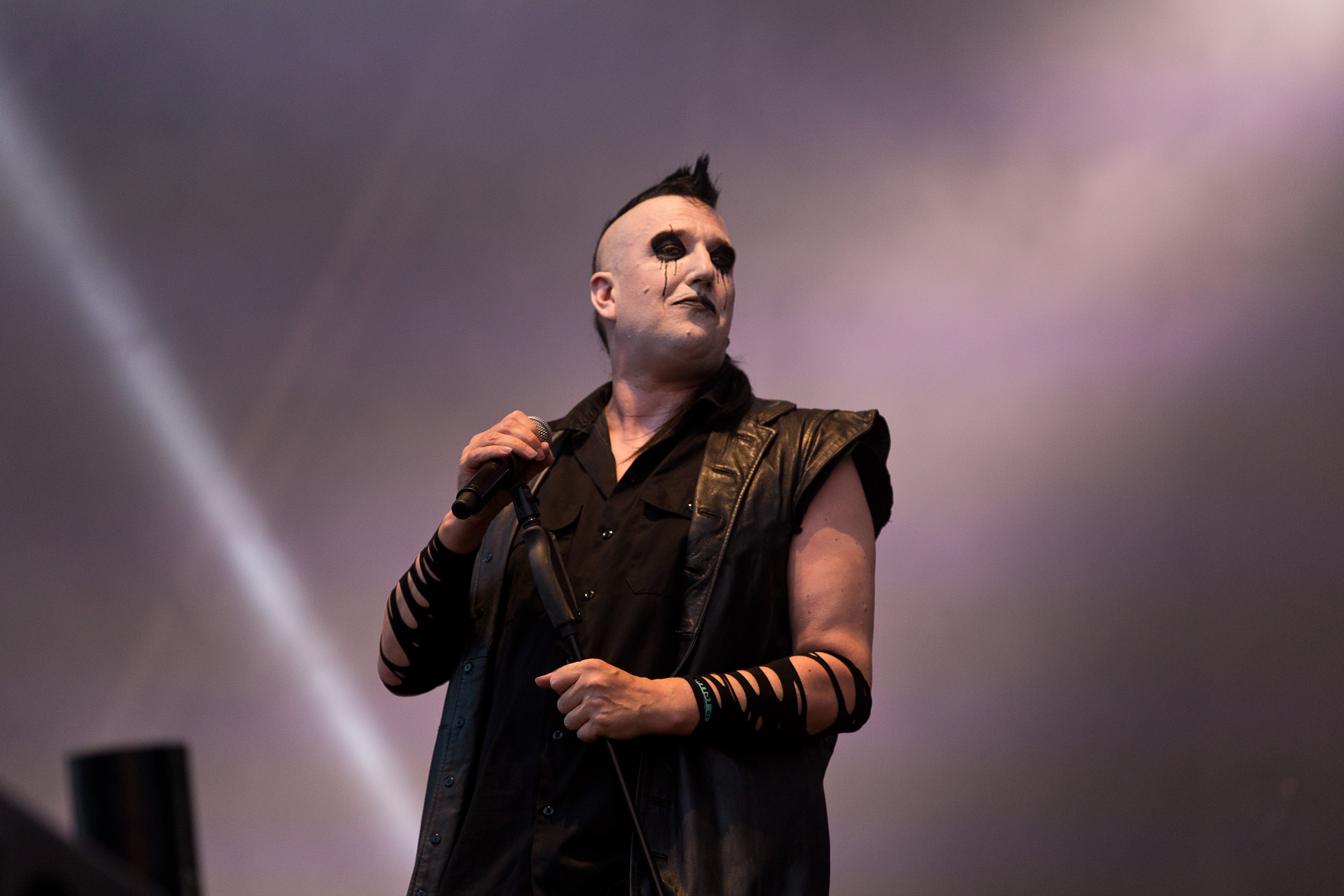
Frontman Alexander "Asp" Spreng at Rockharz Open Air 2016

Current members

- Asp (Alexander Frank Spreng) – vocals (1999–present)
- Lias (Tobias Engel) – bass (2021–present)
- Lutz Demmler – bass, guitar, mandolin, keyboard (2011–present)
- Sören Jordan – guitar (2011–present)
- Stefan Günther – drums (2012–present)

Former members

- Tossi (Andreas Gross) – bass (2000–2021)
- Matze (Matthias Ambré) – guitar, bass guitar, programming (1999–2011)
- Max (Marcus Testory) – choir (2001–2004)
- Holger Hartgen – choir (2000–2004)
- Pit Hammann – choir (2000–2001)
- Himmi (Oliver Himmighoffen) – drums (2000–2012)

== Discography ==
=== Studio albums ===
Year	Title	Peak positions	
Year	Title	GER	AUT
2000	Hast du mich vermisst? (Der Schwarze Schmetterling I)	–	–
2001	:Duett (Der Schwarze Schmetterling II)	–	–
2003	Weltunter (Der Schwarze Schmetterling III)	–	–
2005	Aus der Tiefe (Der Schwarze Schmetterling IV)	50	–
2007	Requiembryo (Der Schwarze Schmetterling V)	38	–
2008	Zaubererbruder – Der Krabat-Liederzyklus	13	–
2011	Fremd (Fremder-Zyklus 1)	9	47
2013	Maskenhaft (Fremder-Zyklus 2)	2	57
2015	Verfallen (Folge 1: Astoria)	7	–
2016	Verfallen (Folge 2: Fassaden)	17	–
2017	Zutiefst (Fremder-Zyklus 3)	12	–
2019	Kosmonautilus (Fremder-Zyklus 4)	20	–
2021	Endlich! (Fremder-Zyklus 5)	–	–
2023	Horrors	–	–

=== Live albums ===
Year	Title	Peak positions
Year	Title	GER
2008	Akoasma: Horror Vacui live	97
2009	Von Zaubererbrüdern	–

=== Compilations ===
Year	Title	Peak positions
Year	Title	GER
2004	Interim Works Compendium (Best of)	–
2004	DJ Revelation 03 (Compiled By ASP) This is a compilation of artists such as Janus, Umbra et Imago, Qntal and others. The only ASP track is the first one.	–
2008	Horror Vacui	42
2011	Der komplette Schwarze Schmetterling – Zyklus {I bis V}	–
2014	Per aspera ad aspera	81

=== EPs ===
Year	Title
2002	Die Zusammenkunft (Duett-Remixes); re-released in 2009
2005	Hunger (only available on the Hunger tour 2005)
2006	Humility (with Chamber)
2006	Hässlich (fan remixes of the ASP song)
2007	Nie Mehr! (10 track EP beginning a new series of releases entitled "Die verschollenen Archive" [The Lost Archives])
2012	GeistErfahrer

=== Singles ===
Year	Title	Peak positions
Year	Title	GER
1999	"ASP" (Promo-CD)	–
2003	"Weltunter (Komm zu mir)"	–
2003	"Stille der Nacht (Ein Weihnachtsmärchen)"	–
2004	"Where do the gods go" (Promo-CD)	–
2004	"Ich will brennen"	–
2005	"Schwarzes Blut" (Promo-CD)	–
2006	"Werben"	–
2006	"Ich bin ein wahrer Satan"	29
2006	"Isobel Goudie" (Limited to less than 1,999 copies)	–
2006	"Varieté Obscur"	–
2007	"Duett (Das Minnelied der Incubi)" (limited to 544 copies)	–
2009	"Wer sonst?"/"Im Märchenland" (Limited to 3,000 copies)	56
2011	"Wechselbalg"	46
2012	"Eisige Wirklichkeit"	
2017	"20.000 Meilen"	
2017	"Zutiefst ..."	
2019	"Geh und heb dein Grab aus, mein Freund"	
2019	"Osternacht"	
2019	"Tintakel"	
2019	"Kosmonautilus"	
2019	"Morgengrauen irgendwo"	
2019	"Abyssus 2 (Musik)"	
2021	"Raise Some Hell Now!"	
2021	"Spät"	
2021	"Ziel"	
2022	"Die letzte Zuflucht"	
2023	"Ich, der Teufel und du"	

=== DVD ===
- 2009: Von Zaubererbrüdern – Live & Unplugged
- 2012: Live auf dem Summer Breeze
- 2019: Zaubererbruder – Der Krabat-Liederzyklus – Live & für immer

=== Box sets ===
- 2007: The Once in a Lifetime Recollection (feat. Chamber live; Limited to 1,999 copies)
- 2011: Der Komplette Schwarze Schmetterling-Zyklus (10-CD box set containing all the songs within the Schwarzer Schmetterling cycle)
