= Seal The Deal & Let's Boogie Tour =

2016–2018 concert tour by Volbeat

- World tour by Volbeat
- Associated album: Seal the Deal & Let's Boogie
- Start date: April 13, 2016
- End date: July 20, 2018
- Legs: 15
- No. of shows: 85 in Europe; 71 in North America; 5 in South America; 161 in total

Volbeat concert chronology
- Outlaw Gentlemen & Shady Ladies Tour (2013–2015); Seal The Deal & Let's Boogie Tour (2016–2018); Rewind, Replay, Rebound Tour (2019)

Seal The Deal & Let's Boogie Tour was a concert tour by Danish rock group, Volbeat in support for the album Seal the Deal & Let's Boogie from 2016.

Doing this tour they played arenas and festivals all over the world, and was the support act for Metallica for their North America Stadium tour, and Guns N' Roses of their European Stadium Tour.

Volbeat played at Parken Stadium in Copenhagen on August 26, 2017, as the first danish band to headline the stadium to a sold out audience of 48.250. Volbeat had multiple guest doing the show, like Lars Ulrich from Metallica. The support act for the show was Flogging Molly and Amorphis.

This was the first tour with Kaspar Boye Larsen on bass.

== Set list ==
This set list is representative of the October 28, 2016 show in Hamburg. It does not represent all dates of the tour.

1. "The Devil's Bleeding Crown"
2. "Heaven Nor Hell/A Warrior's Call/I Only Wanna Be With You"
3. "Lola Montez"
4. "Let It Burn"
5. "Sad Man's Tongue"
6. "Hallelujah Goat"
7. "Maybellene I Hofteholder"
8. "Slaytan"
9. "Dead but Rising"
10. "16 Dollars"
11. "For Evigt"
12. "Guitar Gangsters & Cadillac Blood"
13. "Boa (JDM)"
14. "The Garden's Tale"
15. "Fallen"

Encore

1. "Black Rose"
2. "A Hangman's Body Count"
3. "Doc Holiday"
4. "Seal The Deal"
5. "Still Counting"

== Tour dates ==
List of concerts, showing date, city, country, venue.
Date	City	Country	Venue	Notes
Leg 1 – North America
April 13, 2016	West Hollywood	United States	Roxy Theatre	
April 14, 2016	Las Vegas	United States	The Joint	
April 15, 2016	Indio	United States	Coachella	
April 18, 2016	Modesto	United States	Modesto Centre Plaze	
April 20, 2016	Chico	United States	Silver Dollar Fairground	
April 21, 2016	Fresno	United States	Blazefest	
April 22, 2016	Indio	United States	Coachella	
April 24, 2016	Phoenix	United States	Downtown Phoenix	
April 25, 2016	El Paso	United States	Abraham Chavez Theatre	
April 26, 2016	Lubbock	United States	Lonestar Amphitheatre	
Leg 2 - Europe
June 3, 2016	Mendig	Germany	Rock am Ring	
June 4, 2016	Nuremberg	Germany	Rock im Park	
June 5, 2016	Nijmegen	Netherlands	FortaRock	
June 7, 2016	Berlin	Germany	Spandau Citadel	
June 9, 2016	Interlaken	Switzerland	Greenfield Festival	
June 11, 2016	Vienna	Austria	Nova Rock Festival	
June 12, 2016	Paris	France	Download Festival	
June 17, 2016	Clisson	France	Hellfest	
June 18, 2016	Dessel	Belgium	Graspop Metal Meeting	
June 22, 2016	Bergen	Norway	Bergenhus Fortress	
June 24, 2016	Odense	Denmark	Tinderbox Festival	
June 25, 2016	Strasbourg	France	Artefact Festival	
June 29, 2016	Nibe	Denmark	Nibe Festival	
July 1, 2016	Norrköping	Sweden	Bråvalla Festival	
July 7, 2016	Viveiro	Spain	Resurrection Fest	
July 9, 2016	Stockholm	Sweden	Monsters of Rock	
July 17, 2016	Joensuu	Finland	Ilosaarirock	
Leg 3 - North America
August 6, 2016	Bangor	United States	Rise Above Festival	
August 7, 2016	Montreal	Canada	Heavy Montréal	
August 8, 2016	Brooklyn	United States	Coney Island Amphitheater	
August 9, 2016	Baltimore	United States	Pier Six Pavilion	
August 11, 2016	Pittsburgh	United States	Stage AE	
August 12, 2016	Detroit	United States	Masonic Temple Theater	
August 13, 2016	Columbus	United States	99.7 The Blitz Great Summer Smokeout	
August 15, 2016	Tulsa	United States	Brady Theater	
August 16, 2016	Dallas	United States	The Factory in Deep Ellum	
August 18, 2016	Springfield	United States	Illinois State Fair	
August 19, 2016	Council Bluffs	United States	River Riot	
August 20, 2016	Minneapolis	United States	U.S. Bank Stadium	Supporting Metallica
August 21, 2016	Madison	United States	Exhibition Hall	
August 23, 2016	Des Moines	United States	7 Flags Event Center	
August 24, 2016	Brookings	United States	Swiftel Center	
August 25, 2016	Fargo	United States	Scheels Arena	
August 27, 2016	Edmonton	Canada	Rexall Place	
August 28, 2016	Regina	Canada	Brandt Centre	
August 30, 2016	Calgary	Canada	Grey Eagle Event Center	
September 2, 2016	Palmer	United States	Alaska State Fair	
September 5, 2016	Seattle	United States	WaMu Theater	
September 6, 2016	Spokane	United States	Knitting Factory	
September 7, 2016	Boise	United States	Taco Bell Arena	
September 9, 2016	Salt Lake City	United States	The Complex	
September 10, 2016	Denver	United States	High Elevation Rock Festival	
September 12, 2016	Bonner Springs	United States	Providence Medical Center Amphitheater	
September 13, 2016	Chicago	United States	Riviera Theatre	
September 14, 2016	Grand Rapids	United States	Van Andel Arena	
September 15, 2016	Toledo	United States	The Huntington Center	
September 17, 2016	Mashantucket	United States	Revolution Rock Festival	
September 18, 2016	Chester	United States	Rock Allegiance	
September 20, 2016	Fort Wayne	United States	Allen County War Memorial Coliseum	
September 21, 2016	Nashville	United States	Bridgestone Arena	
Leg 4 - Europe
October 19, 2016	Herning	Denmark	Jyske Bank Boxen	
October 20, 2016	Malmö	Sweden	Malmö Arena	
October 21, 2016	Gothenburg	Sweden	Scandinavium	
October 22, 2016	Stockholm	Sweden	Ericsson Globe	
October 24, 2016	Helsinki	Finland	Hartwall Areena	
October 26, 2016	Oslo	Norway	Oslo Spektrum	
October 27, 2016	Copenhagen	Denmark	Forum Copenhagen	
October 28, 2016	Hamburg	Germany	Barclaycard Arena	
October 29, 2016	Berlin	Germany	Mercedes-Benz Arena	
October 31, 2016	Munich	Germany	Olympiahalle	
November 1, 2016	Linz	Austria	TipsArena Linz	
November 2, 2016	Vienna	Austria	Wiener Stadthalle	
November 4, 2016	Innsbruck	Austria	Olympiahalle	
November 5, 2016	Geneva	Switzerland	Geneva Arena	
November 7, 2016	Stuttgart	Germany	Hanns-Martin-Schleyer-Halle	
November 8, 2016	Zurich	Switzerland	Hallenstadion	
November 9, 2016	Cologne	Germany	Lanxess Arena	
November 10, 2016	Frankfurt	Germany	Festhalle Frankfurt	
November 12, 2016	Leipzig	Germany	Arena Leipzig	
November 13, 2016	Oberhausen	Germany	Oberhausen Arena	
November 14, 2016	Brussels	Belgium	Forest National	
November 15, 2016	Amsterdam	Netherlands	Ziggo Dome	
November 23, 2016	Manchester	England	Manchester Arena	Supporting Alter Bridge
November 24, 2016	London	England	The O2 Arena	Supporting Alter Bridge
November 26, 2016	Nottingham	England	Motorpoint Arena Nottingham	Supporting Alter Bridge
November 27, 2016	Birmingham	England	Genting Arena	Supporting Alter Bridge
November 28, 2016	Cardiff	Wales	Motorpoint Arena Cardiff	Supporting Alter Bridge
December 1, 2016	Glasgow	Scotland	OVO Hydro	Supporting Alter Bridge
December 2, 2016	Leeds	England	First Direct Arena	Supporting Alter Bridge
Leg 5 - North America
May 7, 2017	Charlotte	United States	Carolina Rebellion	
May 9, 2017	Hershey	United States	Giant Center	
May 10, 2017	Baltimore	United States	M&T Bank Stadium	Supporting Metallica
May 12, 2017	Philadelphia	United States	Lincoln Financial Field	Supporting Metallica
May 13, 2017	Portland	United States	Maine State Fair	
May 14, 2017	East Rutherford	United States	MetLife Stadium	Supporting Metallica
May 17, 2017	Uniondale	United States	Nassau Coliseum	Supporting Metallica
May 19, 2017	Foxborough	United States	Gillette Stadium	Supporting Metallica
May 20, 2017	Lewiston	United States	Artpark Amphitheater	
May 21, 2017	Columbus, Ohio	United States	Rock on the Range	
June 3, 2017	Kansas City	United States	Rockfest	
June 4, 2017	St. Louis	United States	Busch Stadium	Supporting Metallica
June 5, 2017	Grand Rapids	United States	20 Monroe Live	
June 7, 2017	Denver	United States	Sports Authority Field	Supporting Metallica
June 9, 2017	Newton	United States	Iowa Speedway	
June 10, 2017	Oklahoma City	United States	The Criterion	
June 11, 2017	Houston	United States	NRG Stadium	Supporting Metallica
July 5, 2017	Orlando, Florida	United States	Camping World Stadium	Supporting Metallica
July 7, 2017	Miami	United States	Hard Rock Stadium	Supporting Metallica
July 8, 2017	Biloxi	United States	Hard Rock Live	
July 9, 2017	Atlanta	United States	SunTrust Park	Supporting Metallica
July 10, 2017	Cincinnati	United States	Riverbend Music Center	
July 12, 2017	Detroit	United States	Comerica Park	Supporting Metallica
July 13, 2017	Cadott	United States	Rock Fest	
July 14, 2017	Oshkosh	United States	Rock USA	
July 16, 2017	Toronto	Canada	Rogers Centre	Supporting Metallica
July 17, 2017	Sayreville	United States	Starland Ballroom	
July 18, 2017	Gilford	United States	Bank of New Hampshire Pavilion	
July 19, 2017	Montreal	Canada	Parc Jean-Dradeau	Supporting Metallica
Leg 6 - Europe
August 3, 2017	Wacken	Germany	Wacken Open Air	
August 23, 2017	Hamburg	Germany	Volkspark	
August 24, 2017	Berlin	Germany	Waldbühne	
August 26, 2017	Copenhagen	Denmark	Parken Stadium	Recorded for Let's Boogie! Live from Telia Parken
August 28, 2017	Mönchengladbach	Germany	Sparkassenpark	
August 30, 2017	Thun	Switzerland	Stockhorn Arena	
September 1, 2017	Graz	Austria	Messe Congress Graz	
September 3, 2017	Schweinfurt	Germany	Willy-Sachs-Stadion	
September 5, 2017	Eindhoven	Netherlands	Strijp-S	
September 7, 2017	Oslo	Norway	Telenor Arena	
September 9, 2017	Stockholm	Sweden	Friends Arena	
Leg 7 - South America
March 15, 2018	Santiago	Chile	Teatro Teleton	
March 16, 2018	Santiago	Chile	Lollapalooza Chile	
March 18, 2018	Buenos Aires	Argentina	Lollapalooza Argentina	
March 21, 2018	Buenos Aires	Argentina	Teatro Vorterix	
March 23, 2018	São Paulo	Brazil	Lollapalooza Brazil	
Leg 8 - Europe
May 26, 2018	Belfast	Northern Ireland	The Telegraph Building	
May 27, 2018	Dublin	Ireland	Olympia Theatre	
May 29, 2018	Manchester	England	The Ritz	
May 30, 2018	London	England	House of Vans	
June 2, 2018	Trondheim	Norway	Trondheim Rocks	
June 6, 2018	Glasgow	Scotland	O2 ABC Glasgow	
June 8, 2018	Donington	England	Download Festival	
June 9, 2018	Interlaken	Switzerland	Greenfield Festival	
June 11, 2018	Esch-sur-Alzette	Luxembourg	Rockhal	
June 13, 2018	Dornbirn	Austria	Messequartier	
June 15, 2018	Florence	Italy	Firenze Rocks	
June 16, 2018	Nickelsdorf	Austria	Nova Rock Festival	
June 18, 2018	Paris	France	Download Festival	
June 19, 2018	Grenoble	France	La Belle Electrique	
June 21, 2018	Natz	Italy	Alpen Flair	
June 23, 2018	Dessel	Belgium	Graspop Metal Meeting	
June 25, 2018	Utrecht	Netherlands	TivoliVredenburg	
June 28, 2018	Seinäjoki	Finland	Provinssirock	
June 30, 2018	Madrid	Spain	Download Festival	
July 1, 2018	Barcelona	Spain	Estadi Olímpic Lluís Companys	Supporting Guns N' Roses
July 2, 2018	Bilbao	Spain	Santana 27	
July 4, 2018	Nijmegen	Netherlands	Goffertpark	Supporting Guns N' Roses
July 6, 2018	Hradec Králové	Czech Republic	Rock for People	
July 9, 2018	Chorzów	Poland	Silesian Stadium	Supporting Guns N' Roses
July 10, 2018	Warsaw	Poland	Stodola	
July 13, 2018	Lichtenvoorde	Netherlands	Zwarte Cross	
July 15, 2018	Velence	Hungary	EFOTT Festival	
July 16, 2018	Tallinn	Estonia	Tallinn Song Festival Grounds	Supporting Guns N' Roses
July 20, 2018	Athens	Greece	Rockwave Festival	

== Personnel ==
- Michael Poulsen - lead vocals, rhythm guitar
- Rob Caggiano - lead guitar, backing vocals
- Kaspar Boye Larsen - bass, backing vocals
- Jon Larsen - drums
