= Beyond Hell/Above Heaven Tour =

2010–2012 concert tour by Volbeat

- World tour by Volbeat
- Associated album: Beyond Hell/Above Heaven
- Start date: May 11, 2010
- End date: July 23, 2012
- Legs: 10
- No. of shows: 149 in North America; 109 in Europe; 1 in South America; 259 in total

Volbeat concert chronology
- Guitar Gangsters & Cadillac Blood Tour (2008–2009); Beyond Hell/Above Heaven Tour (2010–2012); Outlaw Gentlemen & Shady Ladies Tour (2013–2015)

Beyond Hell/Above Heaven was a concert tour by Danish rock group, Volbeat in support for the album Beyond Hell/Above Heaven.

The tour started with Volbeat as a support act for Metallica (World Magnetic Tour) and AC/DC including doing European festivals.

The tour is documented on the concert film "Live from Beyond Hell/Above Heaven", filmed in Copenhagen in 2010, Anaheim and Rock am Ring.

== Set list ==
This set list is representative of the November 15, 2010 show in Hamburg. It does not represent all dates of the tour.

1. "The Mirror and The Ripper"
2. "Maybellene I Hofteholder"
3. "Hallelujah Goat"
4. "16 Dollars"
5. "Heaven Nor Hell"
6. "Guitar Gangsters & Cadillac Blood"
7. "Soulweeper"
8. "Who They Are"
9. "Evelyn"
10. "Mary Ann's Place"
11. "Sad Man's Tongue"
12. "We"
13. "I Only Wanna Be With You"
14. "Pool of Booze, Booze, Booza"

Encore

1. "A Warrior's Call"
2. "Still Counting"
3. "The Garden's Tale"

Encore 2

1. "Fallen"
2. "Thanks"
3. "The Human Instrument"

== Tour dates ==
List of concerts, showing date, city, country, venue.
Date	City	Country	Venue	Notes
Leg 1 – Europe
May 11, 2010	Belfast	Northern Ireland	Odyssey Arena	Supporting Metallica
May 12, 2010	Belfast	Northern Ireland	Odyssey Arena	Supporting Metallica
May 14, 2010	Budapest	Hungary	Ferenc Puskás Stadium	Supporting Metallica
May 16, 2010	Zagreb	Croatia	Zagreb Hippodrome	Supporting Metallica
May 18, 2010	Lisbon	Portugal	Pavilhão Atlântico	Supporting Metallica
May 19, 2010	Lisbon	Portugal	Pavilhão Atlântico	Supporting Metallica
May 22, 2010	Wels	Austria	Flughafen	Supporting AC/DC
May 23, 2010	Lyon	France	Halle Tony Garnier	Supporting Metallica
June 2, 2010	Copenhagen	Denmark	Copenhagen Live	
June 5, 2010	Nuremberg	Germany	Rock am Ring	
June 6, 2010	Nuremberg	Germany	Rock im Park	
June 12, 2010	Donington	England	Download Festival	
June 18, 2010	Jonschwil	Switzerland	Sonisphere Festival	
June 19, 2010	Milovice	Czech Republic	Sonisphere Festival	
June 20, 2010	Dresden	Germany	Festwiese Ostragehege	Supporting AC/DC
June 22, 2010	Berlin	Germany	Olympiastadion	Supporting AC/DC
June 25, 2010	Bucharest	Romania	Sonisphere Festival	
June 26, 2010	Istanbul	Turkey	Sonisphere Festival	
July 8, 2010	Bilbao	Spain	Bilbao BBK Live	
July 9, 2010	Madrid	Spain	Sonisphere Festival	
July 15, 2010	Tønsberg	Norway	Slottsfjell	
July 16, 2010	Lichtenvoorde	Netherlands	Zwarte Cross	
July 17, 2010	Arvika	Sweden	Arvika Festival	
August 5, 2010	Lustenau	Austria	21. Szene Open Air	
August 6, 2010	Skanderborg	Denmark	Smukfest	
August 7, 2010	Pori	Finland	Sonisphere Festival	
Leg 2 – North America
August 13, 210	New York City	United States	Gramercy Theatre	
August 14, 2010	Philadelphia	United States	Theatre of Living Arts	
August 15, 2010	Towson	United States	Recher Theatre	
August 17, 2010	Toronto	Canada	Mod Club Theatre	
August 18, 2010	Flint	United States	The Machine Shop	
August 19, 2010	Chicago	United States	Bottom Lounge	
August 20, 2010	Grand Rapids	United States	The Intersection	
August 22, 2010	Denver	United States	Marquis Theatre	
August 23, 2010	Salt Lake City	United States	The Complex	
August 24, 2010	Boise	United States	Knitting Factory	
August 26, 2010	San Francisco	United States	The Independent	
August 27, 2010	Anaheim	United States	House of Blues	
August 28, 2010	Los Angeles	United States	Sunset Strip Music festival	
Leg 3 – Europe
October 1, 2010	Esbjerg	Denmark	Tobakken	
October 7, 2010	Malmö	Sweden	Malmö Arena	
October 8, 2010	Gothenburg	Sweden	Scandinavium	
October 9, 2010	Stockholm	Sweden	Hovet	
October 11, 2010	Turku	Finland	Turkuhalli	
October 12, 2010	Tampere	Finland	Pakkahoune	
October 13, 2010	Helsinki	Finland	Helsinki Ice Hall	
October 15, 2010	Oulu	Finland	Club Teatria	
October 16, 2010	Luleå	Sweden	Pontushallen	
October 17, 2010	Sundsvall	Sweden	Sporthallen	
October 18, 2010	Trondheim	Norway	Studentersamfundet	
October 20, 2010	Bergen	Norway	USF Verftet	
October 21, 2010	Haugesund	Norway	Byscenen	
October 22, 2010	Stavanger	Norway	Stiftelsen Folken	
October 23, 2010	Oslo	Norway	Sentrum Scene	
November 2, 2010	Düsseldorf	Germany	Philipshalle	
November 3, 2010	Ludwigsburg	Germany	Arena Ludwigsburg	
November 4, 2010	Munich	Germany	Zenith	
November 5, 2010	Vienna	Austria	Gasometer	
November 6, 2010	Graz	Austria	Stadthalle Graz	
November 8, 2010	Winterthur	Switzerland	Eishalle Deutweg	
November 10, 2010	Amsterdam	Netherlands	Heineken Music Hall	
November 11, 2010	Antwerp	Belgium	Lotto Arena	
November 13, 2010	Chemnitz	Germany	Chemnitz Arena	
November 14, 2010	Berlin	Germany	Arena Berlin	
November 15, 2010	Hamburg	Germany	Alsterdorfer Sporthalle	
November 17, 2010	Aarhus	Denmark	Ceres Arena	
November 18, 2010	Aalborg	Denmark	Gigantium	
November 19, 2010	Copenhagen	Denmark	Forum Copenhagen	
November 20, 2010	Odense	Denmark	Arena Fyn	
November 24, 2010	Portsmouth	England	The Wedgewood Rooms	
November 25, 2010	Dublin	Ireland	The Academy 2	
December 1, 2010	Norwich	England	Norwich	
December 2, 2010	Newcastle	England	Academy 2	
December 8, 2010	Birmingham	England	Academy 2	
December 9, 2010	London	England	Electric Ballroom	
Leg 4 – Danish Club Shows
February 23, 2011	Struer	Denmark	Folkets Hus	
February 24, 2011	Viborg	Denmark	Tinghallen	
February 25, 2011	Randers	Denmark	Værket	
February 26, 2011	Frederikshavn	Denmark	Det Musiske Hus	
March 2, 2011	Odense	Denmark	Posten	
March 3, 2011	Esbjerg	Denmark	Tobakken	
March 4, 2011	Kolding	Denmark	Godset	
March 5, 2011	Aarhus	Denmark	Voxhall	
March 9, 2011	Slagelse	Denmark	Slagelse Musikhus	
March 10, 2011	Copenhagen	Denmark	Vega	
March 11, 2011	Helsinge	Denmark	Gribskov Kultursal	
March 12, 2011	Nakskov	Denmark	Idrætscenter	
Leg 5 – North America
March 23, 2011	New York City	United States	Irving Plaza	
March 24, 2011	Philadelphia	United States	Theatre of Living Arts	
March 25, 2011	Toronto	Canada	Sound Academy	
March 26, 2011	Detroit	United States	Saint Andrew's Hall	
March 27, 2011	Chicago	United States	House of Blues	
March 29, 2011	Englewood	United States	Gothic Theatre	
March 30, 2011	Salt Lake City	United States	The Complex	
April 1, 2011	Missoula	United States	Wilma Theatre	
April 2, 2011	Seattle	United States	El Corazón	
April 3, 2011	Vancouver	Canada	Commodore Ballroom	
April 5, 2011	Sacramento	United States	Ace of Spades	
April 6, 2011	West Hollywood	United States	House of Blues	
April 8, 2011	San Francisco	United States	The Fillmore	
April 9, 2011	Anaheim	United States	House of Blues	
April 10, 2011	San Diego	United States	House of Blues	
April 11, 2011	Mesa	United States	Mesa Amphitheatre	
April 13, 2011	Dallas	United States	House of Blues	
April 14, 2011	Houston	United States	Scout Bar	
April 16, 2011	Atlanta	United States	Center Stage	
April 17, 2011	Lake Buena Vista	United States	House of Blues	
April 20, 2011	Los Angeles	United States	Revolver Golden Gods	
April 22, 2011	Baltimore	United States	Sonar	
April 23, 2011	Clifton Park	United States	Northern Lights	
April 25, 2011	Boston	United States	Paradise Rock Club	
April 26, 2011	Montreal	Canada	Club Soda	
April 27, 2011	New York City	United States	Irving Plaza	
Leg 6 – Europe
June 2, 2011	Rho	Italy	Arena Concerti	
June 4, 2011	Nuremberg	Germany	Rock im Park	
June 5, 2011	Nürburg	Germany	Rock am Ring	
June 10, 2011	Warsaw	Poland	Sonisphere Festival	
June 11, 2011	Interlaken	Switzerland	Greenfield Festival	
June 12, 2011	Nickelsdorf	Austria	Nova Rock Festival	
June 13, 2011	Landgraaf	Netherlands	Pinkpop Festival	
June 18, 2011	Gothenburg	Sweden	Metaltown Festival	
June 19, 2011	Seinäjoki	Finland	Provinssirock	
June 24, 2011	Dessel	Belgium	Graspop Metal Meeting	
June 30, 2011	Borlänge	Sweden	Peace & Love	
July 8, 2011	Kvinesdal	Norway	Norway Rock Festival	
July 9, 2011	Amnéville	France	Sonisphere Festival	
July 10, 2011	Knebworth	England	Sonisphere Festival	
Leg 7 – North America
July 24, 2011	Toronto	Canada	Heavy TO	
July 25, 2011	Buffalo	United States	Town Ballroom	
July 26, 2011	Cincinnati	United States	Bogart's	
July 28, 2011	Fort Wayne	United States	Piere's Entertainment Centre	
July 29, 2011	Cleveland	United States	House of Blues	
July 30, 2011	Madison	United States	94.1 JJO Band Camp	
July 31, 2011	St. Louis	United States	The Pageant	
August 2, 2011	Austin	United States	Emo's	
August 3, 2011	New Orleans	United States	House of Blues	
August 5, 2011	Miami Beach	United States	Fillmore Miami Beach	
August 6, 2011	Lake Buena Vista	United States	House of Blues	
August 7, 2011	Charlotte	United States	The Fillmore	
August 10, 2011	Washington, D.C.	United States	9:30 Club	
August 11, 2011	Sayreville	United States	Starland Ballroom	
August 12, 2011	Allentown	United States	Crocodile Rock Café	
August 13, 2011	Wallingford	United States	Toyota Oakdale Theatre	
August 15, 2011	Flint	United States	The Machine Shop	
August 16, 2011	Grand Rapids	United States	The Orbit Room	
August 17, 2011	Chicago	United States	House of Blues	
August 19, 2011	Minneapolis	United States	Fort Avenue	
August 20, 2011	Winnipeg	Canada	Rock On The Range	
August 22, 2011	Edmonton	Canada	Edmonton Event Centre	
August 23, 2011	Calgary	Canada	MacEwan Ballroom	
August 25, 2011	Vancouver	Canada	Commodore Ballroom	
August 26, 2011	Post Falls	United States	Rock Hard At The Park	
August 27, 2011	Missoula	United States	Wilma Theatre	
August 28, 2011	Boise	United States	Knitting Factory	
August 30, 2011	Salt Lake City	United States	The Complex	
August 31, 2011	Colorado Springs	United States	The Black Sheep	
September 2, 2011	Las Vegas	United States	House of Blues	
September 3, 2011	Anaheim	United States	House of Blues	
September 4, 2011	Anaheim	United States	House of Blues	
Leg 8 – Europe
October 22, 2011	Dublin	Ireland	The academy	
October 23, 2011	Belfast	Northern Ireland	Spring & Airbrake	
October 24, 2011	Glasgow	Scotland	The Garage	
October 26, 2011	Sheffield	England	Corporation	
October 27, 2011	Birmingham	England	Academy 2	
October 28, 2011	Manchester	England	Manchester Academy 2	
October 29, 2011	London	England	HMV Forum	
October 31, 2011	Frankfurt	Germany	Jahrhunderthalle	
November 2, 2011	Milan	Italy	Alcatraz	
November 3, 2011	Vienna	Austria	Wiener Stadthalle	
November 4, 2011	Dresden	Germany	Dresden Messe	
November 5, 2011	Munich	Germany	Zenith	
November 7, 2011	Stuttgart	Germany	Hanns-Martin-Schleyer-Halle	
November 8, 2011	Linz	Austria	TipsArena Linz	
November 9, 2011	Basel	Switzerland	St. Jakobshalle	
November 10, 2011	Paris	France	Le Bataclan	
November 12, 2011	Oberhausen	Germany	Köing-Pilsener-Arena	
November 14, 2011	Antwerp	Belgium	Lotto Arena	
November 15, 2011	Rotterdam	Netherlands	Rotterdam Ahoy	
November 16, 2011	Hamburg	Germany	Alsterdorfer Sporthalle	
November 17, 2011	Esch-sur-Alzette	Luxembourg	Rockhal	
Leg 9 – North America
January 26, 2012	Camden	United States	Susquehanna Bank Center	Gigantour
January 27, 2012	Uncasville	United States	Mohegan Sun Arena	Gigantour
January 28, 2012	New York City	United States	The Theatre at Madison Square Garden	Gigantour
January 29, 2012	Lowell	United States	Tsongas Center	Gigantour
February 1, 2012	Glens Falls	United States	Glens Falls Civic Center	Gigantour
February 2, 2012	Quebec City	Canada	Colisée Pepsi	Gigantour
February 3, 2012	Montreal	Canada	Bell Centre	Gigantour
February 5, 2012	Kingston	Canada	K-Rock Centre	Gigantour
February 7, 2012	Oshawa	Canada	General Motors Centre	Gigantour
February 8, 2012	Hamilton	Canada	Copps Coliseum	Gigantour
February 9, 2012	Auburn Hills	United States	The Palace of Auburn Hills	Gigantour
February 10, 2012	Chicago	United States	Aragon Ballroom	Gigantour
February 12, 2012	Milwaukee	United States	Eagles Ballroom	Gigantour
February 14, 2012	St. Paul	United States	The Myth	Gigantour
February 16, 2012	Saskatoon	Canada	Prairieland Park	Gigantour
February 17, 2012	Edmonton	Canada	Shaw Conference Centre	Gigantour
February 18, 2012	Calgary	Canada	Big 4 Building	Gigantour
February 20, 2012	Abbotsford	Canada	Abbotsford Centre	Gigantour
February 21, 2012	Kent	United States	ShoWare Center	Gigantour
February 23, 2012	San Jose	United States	San Jose Event Center	Gigantour
February 24, 2012	Los Angeles	United States	Gibson Amphitheatre	Gigantour
February 25, 2012	Phoenix	United States	Comerica Theatre	Gigantour
February 26, 2012	Albuquerque	United States	Tingley Coliseum	Gigantour
February 28, 2012	Denver	United States	Fillmore Auditorium	Gigantour
March 1, 2012	Dallas	United States	The Palladium	Gigantour
March 2, 2012	Houston	United States	Verizon Wireless Theatre	Gigantour
March 3, 2012	Austin	United States	The Moody Theater	Gigantour
Leg 10 – South America
April 28, 2012	Santiago	Chile	Metalfest	
Leg 11 – North America
April 30, 2012	Mexico City	Mexico	Auditorio BB	
May 2, 2012	Sauget	United States	Pop's	
May 4, 2012	Memphis	United States	Beale Street Music Festival	
May 5, 2012	Marston	United States	Carolina Rebellion	
May 6, 2012	Alpharetta	United States	Project 9-6-1 Cinco Party	
May 9, 2012	Sioux Falls	United States	KRRO Fest	
May 10, 2012	Fargo	United States	The Venue	
May 12, 2012	Kansas City	United States	KQRC 98.9 Rockfest	
May 13, 2012	Boone	United States	KAZR Lazerfest	
May 15, 2012	Grand Rapids	United States	The Intersection	
May 16, 2012	South Bend	United States	Club Forever	
May 18, 2012	Asbury Park	United States	The Bamboozle	
May 19, 2012	Hartford	United States	WCCC Big Gig	
May 20, 2012	Columbus	United States	Rock on The Range	
May 22, 2012	La Crosse	United States	La Crosse Center	
May 24, 2012	Sioux City	United States	Tyson Event Center	
May 25, 2012	Park City	United States	Hartman Arena	
May 26, 2012	Pryor	United States	Rocklahoma	
May 27, 2012	Rockford	United States	Rock Monkey Rukus	
May 29, 2012	Buena Vista Lake	United States	House of Blues	
May 30, 2012	Fort Lauderdale	United States	Revolution Live	
June 18, 2012	Toronto	Canada	Kool Haus	
June 19, 2012	Detroit	United States	Fillmore Auditorium	
June 21, 2012	Boston	United States	House of Blues	
June 22, 2012	Huntington	United States	The Paramount	
June 23, 2012	Clifton Park	United States	Upstate Concert Hall	
June 24, 2012	Atlantic City	United States	Orion Music + More	
June 26, 2012	Maplewood	United States	Myth	
June 27, 2012	Winnipeg	Canada	Bourbon Cummings Theatre	
June 29, 2012	Weyburn	Canada	Crescent Point Place	
June 30, 2012	Gibbons	Canada	Boonstock Music & Arts Festival	
July 2, 2012	Billings	United States	Shrine Auditorium	
July 3, 2012	Spokane	United States	Knitting Factory	
July 5, 2012	Spokane	United States	Knitting Factory	
July 6, 2012	Boise	United States	Knitting Factory	
July 7, 2012	Reno	United States	Knitting Factory	
July 8, 2012	San Francisco	United States	The Ballroom at Regency Center	
July 10, 2012	Anaheim	United States	City National Grove of Anaheim	
July 11, 2012	Tempe	United States	Marquee Theatre	
July 12, 2012	Las Vegas	United States	House of Blues	
July 13, 2012	Magna	United States	Saltair	
July 15, 2012	Colorado Springs	United States	Colorado Springs City Auditorium	
July 16, 2012	Omaha	United States	Sokol Auditorium	
July 18, 2012	Stroudsburg	United States	Shermans Theatre	
July 19, 2012	Baltimore	United States	Rams Head Live!	
July 23, 2012	Norfolk	United States	The NorVa	

== Personnel ==
- Michael Poulsen - lead vocals, rhythm guitar
- Thomas Bredahl - lead guitar, backing vocals
- Anders Kjølholm - bass, backing vocals
- Jon Larsen - drums
