= Outlaw Gentlemen & Shady Ladies Tour =

2013–2015 concert tour by Volbeat

- World tour by Volbeat
- Associated album: Outlaw Gentlemen & Shady Ladies
- Start date: February 19, 2013
- End date: August 1, 2015
- Legs: 15
- No. of shows: 138 in North America; 87 in Europe; 5 in Asia; 5 in Oceania; 235 in total

Volbeat concert chronology
- Beyond Hell/Above Heaven Tour (2010–2012); Outlaw Gentlemen & Shady Ladies Tour (2013–2015); Seal The Deal & Let's Boogie Tour (2016–2017)

Outlaw Gentlemen & Shady Ladies was a concert tour by Danish rock group, Volbeat in support for the album Outlaw Gentlemen & Shady Ladies from 2013.

During this tour Volbeat started play clubs in Denmark, playing at the biggest festivals in Europe, visited Japan and Australia, did an arena tour in Europe, and toured United States multiple times. In 2014 they did 2 big outdoor shows in Denmark, attended by 35.000 people.

They ended the tour in Odense and played to a record crowd of 35.000 people.

This was the first tour with Rob Caggiano on lead guitar and the last tour for Anders Kjølholm on bass.

== Set list ==
This set list is representative of the June 14, 2014 show in Sölvesburg. It does not represent all dates of the tour.

1. "Doc Holiday"
2. "Hallelujah Goat"
3. "Boa (JDM)"
4. "Lola Montez"
5. "Sad Man's Tongue"
6. "Heaven Nor Hell"
7. "A Warrior's Call"
8. "16 Dollars"
9. "Dead but Rising"
10. "Fallen"
11. "A Broken Man and the Dawn/Mary Ann's Place/Rebel Monster/Making Believe"
12. "Evelyn"
13. "Radio Girl"
14. "Cape of Our Hero"
15. "Maybellene I Hofteholder"
16. "Still Counting"

Encore

1. "Pool of Booze, Booze, Booza"
2. "A Hangman's Body Count"
3. "Guitar Gangsters & Cadillac Blood"
4. "The Mirror and The Ripper"

== Tour dates ==
List of concerts, showing date, city, country, venue.
Date	City	Country	Venue	Notes
Leg 1 – Warm Up Danish Shows
February 19, 2013	Copenhagen	Denmark	Vega	
February 20, 2013	Ringsted	Denmark	Ringsted Kongrescenter	
February 22, 2013	Odense	Denmark	Posten	
February 23, 2013	Aarhus	Denmark	Voxhall	
February 24, 2013	Aalborg	Denmark	Multisalen	
Leg 2 – North America
March 6, 2013	Dallas	United States	Palladium Ballroom	
March 7, 2013	Oklahoma City	United States	Diamond Ballroom	
March 9, 2013	San Antonio	United States	Backstage Live	
March 10, 2013	El Paso	United States	Speaking Rock Event Center	
March 11, 2013	Lubbock	United States	Lonestar Pavilion	
March 12, 2013	Denver	United States	Ogden Theatre	
March 14, 2013	Las Vegas	United States	House of Blues	
March 15, 2013	West Hollywood	United States	House of Blues	
March 16, 2013	Anaheim	United States	House of Blues	
March 17, 2013	Reno	United States	Knitting Factory	
March 19, 2013	Garden City	United States	Revolution Concert House & Event Center	
March 20, 2013	Missoula	United States	Wilma Theatre	
March 22, 2013	Seattle	United States	The Showbox	
March 23, 2013	Spokane	United States	Knitting Factory	
March 24, 2013	Calgary	Canada	MacEwan Hall	
March 25, 2013	Prince George	Canada	CN Centre	
March 27, 2013	Dawson Creek	Canada	EnCana Events Centre	
March 28, 2013	Edmonton	Canada	Edmonton Convention Centre	
March 29, 2013	Medicine Hat	Canada	Cypress Centre	
March 30, 2013	Regina	Canada	Brandt Centre	
April 1, 2013	Saskatoon	Canada	Credit Union Centre	
April 2, 2013	Winnipeg	Canada	MTS Centre	
April 3, 2013	Minneapolis	United States	Mill City Nights	
April 5, 2013	Chicago	United States	Aragon Ballroom	
April 6, 2013	Fort Wayne	United States	Piere's Entertainment Centre	
April 7, 2013	Toronto	Canada	Sound Academy	
April 9, 2013	New York City	United States	Best Buy Theatre	
April 10, 2013	Baltimore	United States	Rams Head Live!	
April 11, 2013	Philadelphia	United States	Trocadero Theatre	
April 13, 2013	Orlando	United States	Earthday Birthday	
April 14, 2013	Fort Myers	United States	Fort Rock	
May 1, 2013	Boston	United States	House of Blues	
May 2, 2013	Montclair	United States	Wellmont Theater	
May 3, 2013	Virginia Beach	United States	Lunatic Luau	
May 5, 2013	Concord	United States	Carolina Rebellion	
May 6, 2013	Stroudsburg	United States	Shermans Theater	
May 7, 2013	Niagara Falls	United States	Rapids Theatre	
May 9, 2013	Wichita	United States	Cortillion Ballroom	
May 10, 2013	Boone	United States	KAZR Lazerfest	
May 11, 2013	Kansas City	United States	KQRC 98.9 Rockfest	
May 12, 2013	Maryland Heights	United States	KPNT 105.7 Pointfest 31	
May 14, 2013	Springfield	United States	Shrine Mosque	
May 15, 2013	Lincoln	United States	Bourbon Theatre	
May 16, 2013	Madison	United States	Orpheum Theatre	
May 18, 2013	Oswego	United States	K-Rock Dysfunctional Family BBQ	
May 19, 2013	Columbus	United States	Rock on the Range	
Leg 3 – Europe
May 25, 2013	Jelling	Denmark	Jelling Musikfestival	
May 31, 2013	Berlin	Germany	Kindl Bühne Wuhlheide	
June 1, 2013	Nijmegen	Netherlands	FortaRock	
June 6, 2013	Skive	Denmark	Skive Festival	
June 7, 2013	Nuremberg	Germany	Rock im Park	
June 8, 2013	Nürburg	Germany	Rock am Ring	
June 9, 2013	Tampere	Finland	Sauna Open Air Metal Festival	
June 14, 2013	Donington	England	Download Festival	
June 16, 2013	Nickelsdorf	Austria	Nova Rock Festival	
June 18, 2013	Budapest	Hungary	PeCsa Music Hall	
June 23, 2013	Clisson	France	Hellfest	
June 29, 2013	Norrköping	Sweden	Bråvalla Festival	
June 30, 2013	Roeser	Luxembourg	Rock-A-Field	
July 3, 2013	Arendal	Norway	Hove Festival	
July 5, 2013	Roskilde	Denmark	Roskilde Festival	
July 6, 2013	Werchter	Belgium	Rock Werchter	
July 7, 2013	Arras	France	Main Square Festival	
July 10, 2013	Nimes	France	Arena de Nimes	Supporting Green Day
July 11, 2013	Codroipo	Italy	Villa Manin	Supporting Rammstein
July 12, 2013	Collalbo	Italy	Rock The Ring	
July 18, 2013	Bern	Switzerland	Gurtenfestival	
Leg 4 – Asia
August 10, 2013	Tokyo	Japan	Summer Sonic	
August 11, 2013	Osaka	Japan	Summer Sonic	
Leg 5 – Europe
August 16, 2013	Hockenheim	Germany	Rock 'n' Heim	
August 18, 2013	Gelsenkirchen	Germany	Rock im Pott	
Leg 6 – North America
August 23, 2013	Maplewood	United States	Myth	Rock Allegiance Tour
August 24, 2013	Twin Lakes	United States	WILL ROCK Fest	
August 25, 2013	Cincinnati	United States	U.S. Bank Arena	Rock Allegiance Tour
August 26, 2013	Toronto	Canada	Sound Academy	
August 28, 2013	Sterling Heights	United States	Freedom Hill Amphitheatre	Rock Allegiance Tour
August 29, 2013	Bloomington	United States	U.S. Cellular Coliseum	Rock Allegiance Tour
August 30, 2013	Kansas City	United States	Midland Theatre	Rock Allegiance Tour
August 31, 2013	Tulsa	United States	Cox Business Convention Center	Rock Allegiance Tour
September 2, 2013	Greenwood Village	United States	Locura Festival	Rock Allegiance Tour
September 3, 2013	West Valley City	United States	Maverik Center	Rock Allegiance Tour
September 4, 2013	Las Vegas	United States	The Joint	Rock Allegiance Tour
September 6, 2013	George	United States	Pain In The Grass	Rock Allegiance Tour
September 8, 2013	Abbotsford	Canada	Abbotsford Centre	Rock Allegiance Tour
September 9, 2013	Calgary	Canada	BMO Centre	Rock Allegiance Tour
September 10, 2013	Edmonton	Canada	Rexall Place	Rock Allegiance Tour
September 13, 2013	Phoenix	United States	Desert Uprising	Rock Allegiance Tour
September 14, 2013	Chula Vista	United States	Operation Kick Ass Festival	Rock Allegiance Tour
September 15, 2013	Sacramento	United States	Aftershock Festival	Rock Allegiance Tour
September 16, 2013	Los Angeles	United States	Hollywood Palladium	Rock Allegiance Tour
September 18, 2013	Grand Prairie	United States	Verizon Theatre	Rock Allegiance Tour
September 19, 2013	Houston	United States	Bayou Music Center	Rock Allegiance Tour
September 21, 2013	Gulfport	United States	CPR Fest	Rock Allegiance Tour
September 22, 2013	Atlanta	United States	Tabernacle	Rock Allegiance Tour
September 23, 2013	Greensboro	United States	Greensboro Coliseum	Rock Allegiance Tour
September 25, 2013	Sayreville	United States	Starland Ballroom	Rock Allegiance Tour
September 26, 2013	Philadelphia	United States	Skyline Stage	Rock Allegiance Tour
September 27, 2013	Lowell	United States	Lowell Memorial Auditorium	Rock Allegiance Tour
September 28, 2013	Brooklyn	United States	Williamsburg Park	Rock Allegiance Tour
Leg 7 – Europe
October 11, 2013	Trezzo sull'Adda	Italy	Live Club	
October 12, 2013	Strasbourg	France	Zénith de Strasbourg	
October 13, 2013	Esch-sur-Alzette	Luxembourg	Rockhal	
October 14, 2013	Lille	France	L'Aéronef	
October 16, 2013	Birmingham	England	O2 Academy Birmingham	
October 17, 2013	Glasgow	Scotland	O2 Academy Glasgow	
October 18, 2013	Manchester	England	Manchester Academy	
October 19, 2013	London	England	Brixton Academy	
October 21, 2013	Bilbao	Spain	Santana 27	
October 22, 2013	Barcelona	Spain	Sala Apolo	
October 23, 2013	Madrid	Spain	La Riviera	
October 25, 2013	Paris	France	Le Bataclan	
November 6, 2013	Berlin	Germany	O2 World	
November 7, 2013	Brussels	Belgium	Forest National	
November 8, 2013	Karlsruhe	Germany	Europahalle	
November 9, 2013	Leipzig	Germany	Arena Leipzig	
November 11, 2013	Hamburg	Germany	O2 World	
November 12, 2013	Cologne	Germany	Lanxess Arena	
November 14, 2013	Zürich	Switzerland	Hallenstadion	
November 16, 2013	Hohenems	Austria	Tennis Event Center	
November 17, 2013	Vienna	Austria	Wiener Stadthalle	
November 18, 2013	Graz	Austria	Stadthalle Graz	
November 20, 2013	Frankfurt	Germany	Frankfurt Festhalle	
November 21, 2013	Amsterdam	Netherlands	Ziggo Dome	
November 23, 2013	Herning	Denmark	Jyske Bank Boxen	
November 24, 2013	Copenhagen	Denmark	Forum Copenhagen	
November 25, 2013	Gothenburg	Sweden	Scandinavium	
November 26, 2013	Stockholm	Sweden	Tele2 Arena	
November 28, 2013	Helsinki	Finland	Hartwall Arena	
November 30, 2013	Oslo	Norway	Oslo Spektrum	
December 1, 2013	Copenhagen	Denmark	Forum Copenhagen	
Leg 8 – Asia
February 15, 2014	Tokyo	Japan	Shibuya Club Quattro	
February 16, 2014	Tokyo	Japan	Shibuya Club Quattro	
February 17, 2014	Osaka	Japan	Umeda Club Quattro	
Leg 9 – Oceania
February 22, 2014	Brisbane	Australia	Soundwave Festival	
February 23, 2014	Sydney	Australia	Soundwave Festival	
February 25, 2014	Sydney	Australia	Oxford Art Factory	
February 26, 2014	Melbourne	Australia	The Esplanade Hotel	
February 28, 2014	Melbourne	Australia	Soundwave Festival	
March 1, 2014	Adelaide	Australia	Soundwave Festival	
March 3, 2014	Perth	Australia	Soundwave Festival	
Leg 10 – North America
April 3, 2014	Denver	United States	The Fillmore Detroit	
April 4, 2014	Mescalero	United States	Inn Of The Mountain Gods Resort	
April 5, 2014	Tucson	United States	Pima County Fairgrounds	
April 6, 2014	Anaheim	United States	City National Grove of Anaheim	
April 8, 2014	Modesto	United States	Modesto Centre Plaza	
April 9, 2014	Reno	United States	Grand Sierra Resort	
April 10, 2014	Medford	United States	Medford Armory	
April 11, 2014	Spokane	United States	Knitting Factory	
April 13, 2014	Boise	United States	Taco Bell Arena	
April 14, 2014	Seattle	United States	Paramount Theatre	
April 15, 2014	Missoula	United States	Wilma Theatre	
April 17, 2014	Fargo	United States	The Venue	
April 18, 2014	La Crosse	United States	La Crosse Center	
April 19, 2014	Clive	United States	7 Flags Event Center	
April 21, 2014	Fort Wayne	United States	Piere's	
April 22, 2014	Cleveland	United States	Agora Theatre and Ballroom	
April 23, 2014	Louisville	United States	Palace Theatre	
April 25, 2014	Tampa	United States	WXTB Rockfest	
April 26, 2014	Jacksonville	United States	Welcome to Rockville	
April 27, 2014	Chattanooga	United States	Track 29	
April 28, 2014	Nashville	United States	Marathon Music Works	
April 30, 2014	Pittsburgh	United States	Stage AE	
May 1, 2014	Bethlehem	United States	Sands Event Center	
May 2, 2014	Virginia Beach	United States	Lunatic Luau	
May 3, 2014	Charlotte	United States	Carolina Rebellion	
May 5, 2014	Niagara Falls	United States	The Rapids Theatre	
May 6, 2014	Poughkeepsie	United States	Mid-Hudson Civic Center	
May 8, 2014	Huntington	United States	Paramount Theater	
May 9, 2014	Hampton Beach	United States	Hampton Beach Casino Ballroom	
May 10, 2014	Camden	United States	Susquehanna Bank Center	
Leg 11 – Europe
June 7, 2014	Sölvesborg	Sweden	Sweden Rock Festival	
June 13, 2014	Nickelsdorf	Austria	Nova Rock Festival	
June 15, 2014	Donington	England	Download Festival	
June 19, 2014	Halden	Norway	Tons of Rock	
June 21, 2014	Scheeßel	Germany	Hurricane Festival	
June 22, 2014	Neuhausen ob Eck	Germany	Southside Festival	
June 28, 2014	Dessel	Belgium	Graspop Metal Meeting	
July 1, 2014	Rome	Italy	Rock in Roma	
July 2, 2014	Milan	Italy	Ippodromo del Galoppo	
July 4, 2014	Delitzsch	Germany	Full Force	
July 5, 2014	Sopron	Hungary	Volt Festival	
July 6, 2014	Belfort	France	Eurockéennes	
July 23, 2014	Tolmin	Slovenia	MetalDays	
July 25, 2014	Oulu	Finland	Qstock	
July 31, 2014	Kostrzyn nad Odrą	Poland	Woodstock Poland	
August 1, 2014	Copenhagen	Denmark	Refshaleøen	
August 2, 2014	Horsens	Denmark	Horsens state prison	
August 7, 2014	Gävle	Sweden	Getaway Rock Festival	
August 9, 2014	Villena	Spain	Leyendals del Rock	
August 14, 2014	Gampel	Switzerland	Open Air Gampel	
August 16, 2014	Biddinghuizen	Netherlands	Lowlands Festival	
Leg 12 – North America
September 16, 2014	Salt Lake City	United States	Maverik Center	
September 17, 2014	Billings	United States	Rimrock Auto Arena	
September 18, 2014	Bismarck	United States	Bismarck Civic Center	
September 20, 2014	Cedar Rapids, Iowa	United States	US Cellular Center	
September 21, 2014	Grand Rapids	United States	DeltaPlex Arena	
September 23, 2014	Syracuse	United States	The Oncenter	
September 25, 2014	Baltimore	United States	Baltimore Arena	
September 26, 2014	Lowell	United States	Tsongas Center	
September 27, 2014	Albany	United States	Times Union Center	
September 28, 2014	Uncasville	United States	Mohegan Sun Arena	
September 30, 2014	Portland	United States	Cumberland County Civic Arena	
October 1, 2014	Reading	United States	Santander Arena	
October 3, 2014	Newark	United States	Prudential Center	
October 4, 2014	Youngstown	United States	Covelli Centre	
October 5, 2014	Louisville	United States	Louder Than Life	
October 7, 2014	Fort Wayne	United States	Allen County War Memorial Coliseum	
October 8, 2014	Detroit	United States	Compuware Arena	
October 10, 2014	Huntington	United States	Big Sandy Superstore Arena	
October 11, 2014	Duluth	United States	Gwinnett Arena	
October 12, 2014	Knoxville	United States	Knoxville Civic Coliseum	
October 14, 2014	Orlando	United States	CFE Arena	
October 16, 2014	Biloxi	United States	MS Coast Coliseum	
October 17, 2014	Little Rock	United States	Verizon Arena	
October 18, 2014	Oklahoma City	United States	Chesapeake Center	
October 20, 2014	Wichita	United States	Intrust Bank Arena	
October 21, 2014	Lubbock	United States	TX Lonestar Amphitheatre	
October 22, 2014	Rio Rancho	United States	Santa Ana Star Center	
October 24, 2014	Las Vegas	United States	The Joint	
October 25, 2014	Phoenix	United States	98KUPD Big Red Night of The Dead	
October 26, 2014	San Bernardino	United States	Knotfest	
Leg 13 – Europe
November 14, 2014	Nottingham	England	Rock City	
November 15, 2014	Glasgow	Scotland	Barrowland Ballroom	
November 16, 2014	Manchester	England	Manchester Academy	
November 17, 2014	London	England	Roundhouse	
November 19, 2014	Portsmouth	England	Pyramids Centre	
November 20, 2014	Norwich	England	University of East Anglia	
Leg 14 – North America
April 24, 2015	Denver	United States	1stBank Center	
April 25, 2015	Rapid City	United States	Rushmore Plaza Civic Center	
April 27, 2015	Spokane	United States	Spokane Arena	
April 28, 2015	Missoula	United States	Adams Center	
April 29, 2015	Seattle	United States	WaMu Theater	
May 1, 2015	Grande Prairie	Canada	Revolution Place	
May 2, 2015	Edmonton	Canada	Rexall Place	
May 3, 2015	Calgary	Canada	Stampede Corral	
May 4, 2015	Saskatoon	Canada	SaskTel Centre	
May 6, 2015	Regina	Canada	Brandt Centre	
May 7, 2015	Grand Forks	United States	Ralph Engelstad Arena	
May 9, 2015	Somerset	United States	Northern Invasion	
May 10, 2015	Madison	United States	WJJO MayDay MayLay	
May 12, 2015	Oshawa	Canada	General Motors Centre	
May 13, 2015	Ottawa	Canada	TD Place Arena	
May 14, 2015	Quebec City	Canada	Colisee Pepsi	
May 15, 2015	Montreal	Canada	CEPSUM Montreal	
May 17, 2015	Columbus	United States	Rock on the Range	
May 18, 2015	Saginaw	United States	Dow Event Center	
May 19, 2015	Evansville	United States	Ford Center	
May 20, 2015	Chicago	United States	Aragon Ballroom	
May 22, 2015	Sioux City	United States	Tyson IBF Events Center	
May 23, 2015	Pryor Creek	United States	Rocklahoma	
May 24, 2015	San Antonio	United States	River City Rockfest	
May 25, 2015	El Paso	United States	Balloon Fest	
May 27, 2015	Dallas	United States	Verizon Theatre at Grand Prairie	
May 28, 2015	Houston	United States	Bayou Music Center	
May 30, 2015	Kansas City	United States	Rock Fest	
May 31, 2015	Sauget	United States	Pop's	
June 2, 2015	New York City	United States	Hammerstein Ballroom	
Leg 15 – Europe
August 1, 2015	Odense	Denmark	Tusindårsskoven	

== Personnel ==
- Michael Poulsen - lead vocals, rhythm guitar
- Rob Caggiano - lead guitar, backing vocals
- Anders Kjølholm - bass, backing vocals
- Jon Larsen - drums
