= All the Beauty... =

All the Beauty

Studio album by Mortal Love
- Released: 2 December 2002
- Recorded: Space Valley Studio, Norway, 2002
- Genre: Gothic metal
- Length: 47:38
- Label: Massacre Records
- Producer: Henning Ramseth & Mortal Love

Mortal Love chronology
All the Beauty (2002)	I Have Lost... (2005)

All the Beauty... is the debut album released by the Norwegian gothic metal band Mortal Love, under the German record label Massacre Records, on December 2, 2002.

Professional ratings
Review scores
Source	Rating
Metal Storm	7/10 stars
Rock Hard	7.5/10 stars

== Background ==
All the Beauty... starts the trilogy of releases which tell a story of love and rejection. Zet (Henning Ramseth) from the band Ram-Zet produced the album, which was recorded in his personal recording studio in Norway, the Space Valley Studio.

All the tracks have an instrumental transition that unites them, a continuity technique that wasn't used in the following two albums.

== Track listing ==
All tracks composed by Mortal Love.

No.	Title	Length
1.	"All the Beauty"	6:13
2.	"Crave Your Love"	3:11
3.	"Beautiful One"	6:10
4.	"Falling for You"	5:20
5.	"In the Sun"	6:10
6.	"Hate to Feel"	6:01
7.	"I Want to Die"	9:51
8.	"Mortally Beloved"	5:22
Total length:		47:38

== Personnel ==
=== Mortal Love ===
- Cat (Catherine Nyland) – Female vocals
- Lev (Hans Olav Kjeljebakken) – Bass, vocals
- Rain6 (Lars Bæk) – Guitars & Programming
- Damous (Pål Wasa Johansen) – Drums
- Gabriah (Ørjan Jacobsen) – Guitars

=== Session musicians ===
- Tord Øverland Knudsen – Cello in "Falling For You"
- Zet (Henning Ramseth) – Keyboards & Programming, Additional Guitar and Bass in "Hate To Feel"

== Additional notes ==
- Producer, Keyboards, Programmed - Henning Ramseth.
- Recorded in Space Valley studio 2002.
- Mastered at Lydmuren.
- Phonography by Арт Мюзик Групп
