= Elvenstorm =

French heavy metal band

Elvenstorm, also stylized ElvenStorm is a French heavy metal band. The band notably released one album on Massacre Records.

== Discography ==
- Of Rage and War (2011, Infernö Records)
- Blood Leads to Glory (2014, Infernö Records)
- Soulreaper (EP, 2015, Infernö Records)
- The Conjuring (2018, Massacre Records)
