= Worlds Apart (Horizon album) =

Studio album by Horizon
- Released: March 29, 2004
- Genres: Power metal; progressive metal
- Length: 58:21
- Labels: Massacre; King
- Producers: Krissy Friedrich; Patrick Hemer

Horizon chronology
The Sky’s the Limit (2002)	Worlds Apart (2004)

Worlds Apart
Review scores
Source	Rating
Disagreement.net	7/10 stars
The Metal Crypt	2.5/5
MetalReviews.com	80/100

Worlds Apart is an album by the German progressive/power metal band Horizon.

== Track listing ==
No.	Title	Writer(s)	Length
1.	"Burning Hunger"	Music & Lyrics: Hemer	5:48
2.	"Always a Stranger"	Music: Hemer, Friedrich/Lyrics: Hemer	5:52
3.	"Edge of Insanity"	Music: Hemer/Lyrics: Hemer, Boyce	5.59
4.	"When the Night Falls"	Music & Lyrics: Hemer	5:16
5.	"Brainwashed"	Music & Lyrics: Hemer	5:42
6.	"Hell or High Water"	Music & Lyrics: Hemer	6:00
7.	"The Black Mark"	Music: Hemer	4:55
8.	"Mercy"	Music & Lyrics: Hemer	6:53
9.	"Backstabber"	Music & Lyrics: Hemer	4:58
10.	"S & M"	Music & Lyrics: Hemer	7:00
11.	"Don't Hide in the Shadow – Remix" (Japanese Bonus Track)	Music & Lyrics: Hemer	5:05
12.	"Die for the Moment" (Japanese Bonus Track)	Music: Hemer, Friedrich/Lyrics: Hemer, Boyce	4:13

== Personnel ==
- Patrick Hemer: guitars, bass, keyboards, lead and background vocals
- J.P. “Giam” Giraldi : keyboards
- Krissy Friedrich: drums and background vocals
