= Unrest (disambiguation) =

Unrest is a social disturbance.

Unrest may also refer to:

== Music ==
- Unrest (American band), an American indie rock band
- Unrest (German band), a German metal band
- Unrest (Erlend Øye album), 2003
- Unrest (Henry Cow album), 1974
- Unrest (Unrest album), 1985
- "Unrest", a song by Parkway Drive from Deep Blue, 2010
- "Unrest", a song by Wolves at the Gate from Wasteland, 2025
- "The Unrest", a song by Insomnium from Anno 1696, 2023

== Other uses ==
- Unrest (2006 film), an American horror film
- Unrest (2017 film), an American documentary
- Unrest (2022 film), a Swiss film
- Unrest (video game), a 2014 role-playing game
