= Best of the Trilogy... All the Beauty I Have Lost Forever Will Be Gone =

Greatest hits album by Mortal Love
- Released: 15 July 2011
- Recorded: Space Valley Studio, Norway between 2002-2006
- Genre: Gothic metal
- Length: 60:14
- Label: Massacre Records
- Producer: Henning Ramseth & Mortal Love

Mortal Love chronology
Forever Will Be Gone (2006)	Best of the Trilogy... All the Beauty I Have Lost Forever Will Be Gone (2011)

Best of the Trilogy ... All the Beauty I Have Lost Forever Will Be Gone is a compilation album by the Norwegian gothic metal band Mortal Love, released on the German record label Massacre Records on 15 July 2011.

== Background ==
To the date of release of this album, the ten-year contract signed for the band with Massacre Records was about to expire. Shortly after this, Mortal Love was officially dissolved after five years of inactivity.

The album consists of a selection of the best songs of the three studio albums released by the band between 2002 and 2006.

== Track listing ==
All tracks composed by Mortal Love.

1. Existence - 06:08
2. Adoration - 06:01
3. Senses - 03:49
4. Reality - 08:38
5. Everything - 03:43
6. All the Beauty... - 06:13
7. Crave Your Love - 03:11
8. Beautiful One - 06:10
9. I Want to Die - 09:51
10. Mortally Beloved - 05:23
11. I Make the Mistake - 04:23
12. My Shadow Self - 03:50
13. As We Can Not Be One (instrumental) - 01:33

== Personnel ==
=== Mortal Love ===
- Cat (Catherine Nyland) – Female vocals
- Lev (Hans Olav Kjeljebakken) – Bass, vocals
- Rain6 (Lars Bæk) – Guitars & Programming, vocals
- Damous (Pål Wasa Johansen) – Drums
- Mulciber (Ole Kristian Odden) – Keyboards & Programming
- Gabriah (Ørjan Jacobsen) – Guitar

=== Session musicians ===
- Zet (Henning Ramseth) – Additional Guitar and vocals in "Everything" and "I Make the Mistake"

== Additional notes ==
- Phonographic Copyright – Mystic Empire
- Manufactured By – Мистик Импайр
- Licensed From – Massacre Records
- Recorded At – Space Valley Studio
- Mixed At – The Red Room
- Mastered At – The Red Room
- Layout [Cover Layout], Design – Katja Piolka
- Mixed By, Mastered By – Andy Horn
- Photography By – www.everainmedia.com
- Producer – Lev, Rain6, Zet
