= Incubator (band) =

German band

Incubator is death metal group from Germany. Active during the 1990s, they notably released two albums on the bigger metal indie labels Steamhammer/SPV and Massacre Records.

Their albums were reviewed by the metal press including Rockhard.de, Metal.de and Powermetal.de.

== Discography ==
- Symphonies of Spiritual Cannibalism (1991, Morbid Music)
- McGillroy the Housefly (1992, West Virginia Records)
- Hirnnektar (1993, Steamhammer/SPV)
- MCMETALXCVIII (1998, Chameleon Records)
- Divine Comedy (2000, Godz Greed Records)
- LieBISSlieder (2008, Massacre Records)
