= Sky's the Limit =

Sky's the Limit or The Sky's the Limit may refer to:

== Film and television ==
- Sky's the Limit, a 1925 American film directed by Harry L. Fraser
- The Sky's the Limit (1938 film), a British film
- The Sky's the Limit (1943 film), a musical comedy starring Fred Astaire and Joan Leslie
- The Sky's the Limit (1975 film), a 1975 Walt Disney film starring Pat O’Brien and Ike Eisenmann
- Aasma: The Sky Is the Limit, a 2009 Indian film

=== Television ===
- The Sky's the Limit (game show), a 1970s UK TV game show
- "The Sky's the Limit" (Only Fools and Horses), a 1990 episode of Only Fools and Horses
- "...and the sky's the limit" are the last words in the series finale of Star Trek: The Next Generation
- The Sky's the Limit (Star Trek), a collection of short stories based on the Star Trek franchise

== Music ==
- Sky's the Limit (band), an early project of Mae co-founder Dave Elkins

=== Albums ===
- Sky's the Limit (The Temptations album), 1971
- Sky's the Limit (Magic album), or the title song
- The Sky’s the Limit (Horizon album), 2002
- The Sky's the Limit (Blackhawk album), 1998
- The Sky's the Limit (Dynamic Superiors album), 1980
- Sky's the Limit, a 1978 album by Rhythm Heritage
- Sky Is the Limit (DJ Antoine album), 2013
- Da Sky's da Limit, a 2002 album by Big Pokey

=== Songs ===
- "Sky's the Limit" (The Notorious B.I.G. song), a 1997 song by The Notorious B.I.G.
- "Sky's the Limit" (Ola song), 2009
- "Sky's the Limit", a single by Taufik Batisah and Rui En, 2013
- "Skies the Limit", a 1990 song by Fleetwood Mac
- "The Sky's the Limit" (song), a 2009 song by Jason Derülo
- "The Sky's the Limit", Dennis Alcapone 1972
