= Tales of Tragedy =

Studio album by Winter's Verge
- Released: 29 January 2010
- Genre: Power metal
- Length: 55:25
- Label: Massacre Records
- Producer: R.D. Liapakis

Winter's Verge chronology
Eternal Damnation (2008)	Tales of Tragedy (2010)	Beyond Vengeance (2012)

Professional ratings
Review scores
Source	Rating
Heavymetal.dk	10/10 stars

Tales of Tragedy is the third full-length album released by Cypriot Power metal band Winter's Verge. The harmonies and rhythms on the album are more complex and sophisticated than previous releases, with a darker atmosphere. The guitar work shows a greater influence from thrash and groove metal, and Chris Ioannides' drumming reveals a strong progressive metal element. Classical influences have a high profile, with several songs employing orchestrations reminiscent of Romantic era classical composers and a bass solo on the penultimate track derived from the third movement of Beethoven's Moonlight Sonata.

== Concept ==
Tales of Tragedy is a concept album, but not in the manner which tells a cohesive story. According to Ioannides, the concept revolves around the telling of 11 short, individual 'tales of tragedy'. The liner notes include quotations from famous literary works below the lyrics of each song, referring to the themes discussed.

== Track listing ==
1. "World of Lies" - 4:19
2. "Old Man’s Wish" - 4:53
3. "I Swear Revenge" - 4:13
4. "For Those Who Are Gone" - 5:21
5. "The Captain’s Log" - 5:30
6. "Envy" - 5:04
7. "Dark Entries" - 4:53
8. "Madness Once Called Love" - 4:51
9. "Tomorrow’s Dawn" - 3:49
10. "Reflections of the Past" - 6:30
11. "Curse of Time" - 3:58

== Personnel ==
- George Charalambous – vocals
- Harry Pari – guitars
- Stefanos Psillides – keyboards
- Miguel Trapezaris – bass
- Chris Ioannides – drums
