= Hammerschmitt =

German metal band

Hammerschmitt was a German heavy metal band. They released five albums.

The band was built on Pierrot, existing from 1986 to 1996 and playing the same genre.

From 2016 the band released their material through Massacre Records. They disbanded in 2020.

== Select discography ==
- Hammerschmitt (2000)
- Mein Herz (2005)
- 12 – Jenseits der Stille (2011)
- Born to Rock (EP, 2013)
- Still on Fire (2016)
- Dr. Evil (2019)

They should not be confused with another band called Hammerschmitt from Hesse who released Airborn in 2008.
