= Eternal Damnation =

Studio album by Winter's Verge
- Released: 14 March 2008
- Recorded: Prophecy & Music Factory Studios
- Genre: Power metal
- Length: 54'
- Label: Limb Music
- Producer: Roberto Dmitri Liapakis

Winter's Verge chronology
Another Life...Another End (2006)	Eternal Damnation (2008)	Tales of Tragedy (2010)

Professional ratings
Review scores
Source	Rating
Heavymetal.dk	6/10 stars

Eternal Damnation is the second full-length album released by Cypriot Power metal band Winter's Verge. It was recorded in Germany and released in April 2008 by Limb Music Productions. The album combines elements of metal. The music is characterized by fast-paced riffs, double-bass drumming and vocals, with interspersed keyboard parts and composition influenced by other music.

== Track listing ==
- Lyrics by George Charalambous. Music by George Charalambous, Harry Pari and Stefanos Psillides.
1. Eternal Damnation 4:46
2. My Winter Sun 4:52
3. Get Me Out 3:55
4. Hold My Hand 5:09
5. A Secret Once Forgotten 5:25
6. Goodbye 5:42
7. Spring Of Life 4:09
8. Can You Hear Me 5:18
9. For I Have Sinned 3:02
10. To You I Sail Tonight 6:35
11. Suicide Note 3:31

== Personnel ==
=== Winter's Bane ===
- George Charalambous – Vocals
- Perikles Mallopoulos – Guitars
- Stefanos Psillides – Keyboards
- Miguel Trapezaris – Bass
- Andreas Charalambous – Drums

=== Additional personnel ===
- R.D. Liapkis: Additional backing vocals
