= Tears of Martyr =

Spanish symphonic metal band

- Origin: Las Palmas, Spain
- Genres: Symphonic metal Gothic metal Death/doom
- Years active: 1996–present
- Labels: Massacre Records
- Members: Berenice Musa; Miguel Angel Marqués; Adrián Miranda; Doramas Párraga
- Website: tearsofmartyr.com

Tears Of Martyr is a Spanish symphonic metal band from Las Palmas. The band was formed in 1996. Their latest album Tales was released with Massacre Records on April 26, 2013.

== History ==
The band was formed in 1996 in Las Palmas, Spain. In 1996 they released their first demo album The Essence of Evil. After a long years of silence comes out their second demo Renascence (2005). In 2007 band moved to Madrid. In June 2009, they released their first full-length album Entrance. Later that year lead singer Berenice Musa won Metal Female Awards 2009 in the category of best Spanish metal band singer.

In August 2012 the band entered New Sin Studio (Italy) where they have recorded and mastered their second full-length album Tales produced by Enrik García (Dark Moor). The album was released with Massacre Records on April 26, 2013.

== Members ==
Current line-up

- Berenice Musa – soprano
- Miguel Angel Marqués – guitars and vocals
- Adrián Miranda – bass
- Doramas Párraga – drums

Former members

- Armando J. Álvarez – vocals, bass
- Javier Montesdeoca – guitar
- Oscar Morante – guitar
- Yeray Corujo – keyboard

== Discography ==
Demo

- The Essence of Evil (1996)
- Renascence (2005)

Albums

- Entrance (2009)
- Tales (2013)

=== Singles ===
- Eyes To See, Heart To Feel (2002)
- Ancient Pine Awaits II (2019)
