= Darker Half =

Australian heavy metal band since 2005

- Origin: Sydney
- Genre: Power metal Thrash metal
- Years active: 2005–Present
- Labels: Massacre Records, *Fastball Music, Soulfood Distribution: Rockstar Records, MGM Distribution
- Members: Vo Simpson; Dom Simpson; Danny Ritz; Jimmy Wynen
- Past members: Brad Dickson (D.2020); Ben Martino; Nick Alderton; Jim Bridgeman; Max Griffiths; Jimmy Lardner-Brown; Simon Hamilton
- Website: darkerhalf.com

Darker Half is an Australian heavy metal band from Sydney, led by vocalist Vo Simpson and known for their energetic live performances, their style has been described as power/thrash.

== History ==
Singer/guitarist Vo Simpson started Darker Half in 2003 while in high school. The band performed in halls and occasionally (illegally) in pubs. Darker Half's first foray into the wider Australian metal community was the band's performance at the first Metalstock festival in 2005.

Drummer Jim Bridgeman and bass player Max Griffiths left the band when they graduated from high school and were replaced by Benito Martino (drums) and Simon Hamilton (bass). An EP "Enough is Enough" was released at the second Metalstock festival in 2006. A song from the EP was included in the soundtrack of the feature film DarkLoveStory.

Darker Half played in various venues on the east coast of Australia throughout 2006 and 2007 and took part in all three outdoor Metalstock festivals. In 2008 Nick Alderton was replaced by Dom Simpson (Vo's brother) on guitar. In 2009 they released their first album Duality, produced by former Dimmu Borgir guitarist Astennu. One song from the album, "Take the Plunge", was included in the soundtrack of the feature film Acolytes starring Joel Edgerton.

In 2009 they toured nationally as support act for original Iron Maiden lead singer Paul Di'Anno. A music video for "Take the Plunge" was released. Martino left and was replaced on drums by Dom Simpson, who in turn was replaced on guitar by Brad Dickson. A national tour with Queensryche followed, along with a spot on the inaugural Screamfest international metal festival in Sydney. In 2010 Darker Half again toured nationally with Paul Di'Anno, released a music video "Helpless" and performed at many shows throughout Australia.

Early in 2011, Darker Half recorded their second album Desensitized, which was released in Australia on Rockstar Records. Their "Desensitized tour" in August 2011 included all of the Australian state capitals and many major regional centres. They headlined the Whiplash Festival in Brisbane and opened for international acts Alestorm, Children of Bodom and Steve Grimmett.

In 2012, The Darker Half members were involved in projects aside from the band: Vo Simpson joined with various international singers including Udo Dirkschneider, Rob Rock and Steve Grimmett as one of the featured lead vocalists on the third Empires of Eden album Channelling the Infinite. He was also one of several guest lead vocalists on the Snake Sixx album It's all about the Riff. Through May and June 2012 Dom Simpson and Vo Simpson formed part of the backing band for former Judas Priest lead singer Tim 'Ripper' Owens for his Australian and New Zealand tour. Also in 2012, Darker Half released a music video of "End of the Line" from the Desensitized album.

In 2013, the band took part in a concert with Melbourne band Eyefear and veteran metal band Stratovarius.

In 2014, Darker Half release the band's third album, Never Surrender and undertook their first tour of the US.

In 2015, it was announced that Brad Dickson was leaving Darker Half. He was replaced by Jimmy Lardner-Brown, who had played with the Simpson brothers in the backing band for Tim "Ripper" Owens.

In February 2016 "Never Surrender" was released in Europe on the Fastball Music label and received much critical acclaim.

In June 2016, the EP "Classified" was released in Europe to coincide with Darker Half's first tour there. They played in Serbia, Russia, Romania, Bulgaria and Croatia. The returned to Europe in November that year as special guests of Rage, playing in Germany, Austria, Slovakia, Poland, Switzerland, Italy and Belgium.

In February 2020 they signed with Massacre Records and their first album on Massacre "If You Only Knew" was released in March 2020. A tour to coincide with the release was cancelled due to Covid.

Former guitarist, Brad Dickson, died on 15 April 2020.

They were finally able to return to Europe in 2023 as special guests of Geoff Tate. They also supported him in Australia that year and toured Europe with him again in 2024. Following that tour Darker Half bassist Jimmy Wynen was seconded to play in Geoff Tate’s touring band.

In February 2024 they released the live album "If You Only ...Live". It was recorded at Musiekgieterij in Maastricht Holland and featured mostly songs songs from "if You Only Knew" plus some other songs. The physical editions included "From Disaster", which was as yet unreleased. In April and May 2024 they headlined an east coast Australian tour "If You Only...Toured".

In April 2025 they released "The Elephant Incident" a digital-only EP of covers recorded live at Dom Simpson's studio Elephant Sounds. It featured songs by bands they felt were important to them: "Breaking the Law" by Judas Priest; "Heaven and Hell" by Black Sabbath; "Queen of the Reich" by Queensryche; "Wasted Years" by Iron Maiden and "Straight to Hell" by Rage.

In August 2025 they released the album "Book of Fate" featuring the singles “From Disaster” and “Another Day Another Nightmare”. The release coincided with another tour of Europe.

== Discography ==
- Rush demo (2003)
- Enough is Enough EP (2006)
- Duality album (2009)
- Desensitized album (2011)
- Never Surrender. album (2014)
- Classified EP (2016)
- If You Only Knew album (2020)
- If You Only...Live album (2024)
- The Elephant Incident EP (2025)
- Book of Fate album (2025)
- Book of Bensheim album (2026)
