= Painflow =

Finnish industrial metal band

- Origin: Finland
- Genres: Industrial metal, groove metal
- Years active: 1997–2001
- Labels: Massacre, Spinefarm

Painflow is a Finnish industrial metal band from Kokkola, formed in 1997.

== History ==
Painflow's first demo would secure a deal with Massacre Records. The band's debut album was recorded at Woodhouse Studios, Hagen, Germany with producer Siggi Bemm. However, unsatisfied with the mix the group returned to Finland getting Mikko Karmila to conduct a remix.

Just as the album was completed guitarist and programmer Jarkko Mäki unexpectedly committed suicide. Beset by this tragedy the band took time to consider whether to continue or not, eventually resolving to forge ahead with Ville Janatuinen taking over guitar. Their debut album Audio-Visual-Aids was released in July 1999, issued with differing cover art in their home country by Spinefarm Records. The new line-up performed their first live show at With Full Force festival in 1999.

Following several live shows Painflow enrolled new drummer Lauri Bexar and Pekka Hackspik replaced Arjo Wennström on guitar. After a further run of shows in Finland the group splintered in two with Ville Janatuinen and bassist Mika Hotakainen departing. Adding new guitarist Rami Kaartamo and severing ties with Massacre Records Painflow was known as God's an Insect for a short while, before morphing into Zero Industry during 2002. The band at this juncture cited a roll call of vocalist Aki Viljamaa, guitarists Pekka Hackspik and Rami Kaartamo and drummer Lauri Bexar.

== Band members ==
- Aki Viljamaa – vocals
- Pekka Hackspik – drums, programming, guitar
- Jarkko Mäki – guitar, programming (1997–1999)
- Arjo Wennström – guitar (1997–2000) (ex-Beherit, ex-UltraNoir)
- Mika Hotakainen – bass, vocals
- Ville Janatuinen – guitar (1999–2001)
- Lauri Bexar – drums (2000–2001) (Winterborn)

== Discography ==
Albums

- Audio-Visual-Aids (1999)

Singles

- "Frontline" (1999)
