= Horizon (band) =

- Origin: Germany
- Genres: Power metal Progressive metal
- Years active: 1998–2006
- Labels: Massacre Records; King Records (Japan)
- Past members: Patrick Hemer; Bruno J. Frank; Vinnie Angelo; ”Giam” Giraldi; Krissy Friedrich

Horizon was a German progressive metal/power metal band.

== History ==
Horizon was formed in 1998 by drummer Krissy Friedrich and guitarist Patrick Hemer.
After a self-produced debut, they were introduced to Massacre Records by Kosta Zafiriou of Pink Cream 69 and had their first worldwide release, “The Sky’s the Limit”, in 2002, with the help of German producer Achim Kohler. The album, mixing AOR elements with intense riffing and brilliant guitar solos, was critically acclaimed and was released in Japan through King Records.
The band started then to audition lead singers to allow Patrick Hemer more freedom to dedicate to his guitar playing and a few names leaked out like that of Chitral Somapala (Firewind, Avalon) and Jakob Samuel (Talisman, The Poodles), but 2004 saw the release of “Worlds Apart” with Patrick Hemer on lead vocals once again.
Much heavier than its predecessor, especially due to Hemer's use of a seven-string guitar, “Worlds Apart” was more or less well regarded by some of the European media that had praised “The Sky’s The Limit” but received a warm welcome in Japan (where the famous Burrn! magazine labelled Horizon a “legendary band”) and started to gain the group a cult following.
2005 was supposed to see the band back in the studio to start working on a follow-up to “Worlds Apart” but this album never saw the light of the day. Although no official break-up has ever been announced, “Worlds Apart” remains the last recording of the band to date.
Today, Patrick Hemer seems to be the only former member of Horizon to pursue an active musical career as a studio musician, guitar clinician and solo artist.

== Members ==
- Patrick Hemer - guitar, vocals
- Bruno J. Frank - bass, background vocals
- Vinnie Angelo - keyboards, background vocals (1999–2002)
- JP “Giam” Giraldi - keyboards, background vocals (2003–2005)
- Krissy Friedrich - drums, background vocals

== Albums ==
- Horizon – self-production (1999)
- The Sky's the Limit - Massacre Records (2002)
- Melody and Power - Massacre Records compilation with Firewind, Silent Force, Edenbridge,... (2003)
- Worlds Apart - Massacre Records (2004)
