= The Sky's the Limit (Horizon album) =

Studio album by Horizon
- Released: March 25, 2002
- Genre: Progressive metal
- Length: 50:21
- Label: Massacre Records; King Records (Japan)
- Producer: Krissy Friedrich and Patrick Hemer

Horizon chronology
Horizon (1999)	The Sky's the Limit (2002)	Worlds Apart (2004)

The Sky's the Limit is an album by the German progressive metal band Horizon.

== Track listing ==
No.	Title	Writer(s)	Length
1.	"Sunset"	Music: Hemer	0:35
2.	"Freedom"	Music: Friedrich, Hemer/Lyrics: Hemer	4:23
3.	"Living in Danger"	Music & Lyrics: Hemer	6:20
4.	"Keep On Fighting"	Music & Lyrics: Hemer	5:32
5.	"Don’t Hide in the Shadow"	Music & Lyrics: Hemer	5:05
6.	"Hometown Star"	Music & Lyrics: Hemer	3:47
7.	"Put Your Money Where Your Mouth Is"	Music: Friedrich, Hemer/Lyrics: Hemer	6:20
8.	"Atlantis"	Music: Hemer	6:53
9.	"So Long Ago"	Music: Hemer	0:56
10.	"Caught in the Middle"	Music: Hemer/Lyrics: Hemer, Boyce	6:43
11.	"The End"	Music & Lyrics: Hemer	5:45
12.	"Lies and Deception" (Bonus Track For Japan)	Music: Friedrich, Hemer/Lyrics: Boyce, Hemer	4:13

== Personnel ==
- Patrick Hemer: guitars, vocals
- Vinnie Angelo : keyboards and background vocals
- Bruno J. Frank : bass and background vocals
- Krissy Friedrich: drums and background vocals
