= Jotnar (band) =

Spanish metal band

- Origin: Las Palmas de Gran Canaria, Spain
- Genres: Melodic death metal
- Years active: 2008–present
- Labels: Coroner Records; Massacre Records (current)
- Members: Mario Infantes; Ben Melero; Elhadji N'Diaye; Octavio Santana; Jose "Xurro" Rodríguez
- Past members: Misael Montesdeoca; Eduardo Rodríguez
- Website: jotnar.com

Jotnar is a Spanish melodic death metal band founded in Las Palmas de Gran Canaria (Canary Islands) in 2008. Their first release was the 2012 five-track EP Giant which was released via the Italian record label Coroner Records. During the same year, Jotnar performed in international metal festivals like Metalcamp 2012 (Slovenia) and "RockBitch Boat 2012" (Sweden).

In 2015, vocalist Misael Montesdeoca left the band and was replaced by Mario Infantes from the band Denia. The band's debut album Connected/Condemned was released in April 2017 via Massacre Records.

== Current members ==
- Mario Infantes – vocals
- Ben Melero – guitars
- Elhadji N'Diaye – guitars & backing vocals
- Octavio Santana – bass guitar
- Jose Rodriguez – drums

== Discography ==
=== EP ===
- Giant (Coroner Records/Murdered Music) – 2012

=== Full-length ===
- Connected/Condemned (Massacre Records) – 2017

=== Music videos ===
- I Am Giant (Director's cut) – 2012
- Perfect Lie (Lyric video) – 2013
- In Process (Live video) – 2014
- Connected/Condemned – 2016
- Broken Esteem (feat. Björn "Speed" Strid) – 2017
- Starved of Guidance – 2017
- Suicidal Angel – 2017
