= Deliver the Galaxy =

German metal band

Deliver the Galaxy is a German melodic death metal band. They have released three albums, the third of which on Massacre Records.

== Discography ==
- The Galaxy (EP, 2012)
- Project Earth (2014)
- The Journey (2020)
- Bury Your Gods (2024)
