= Mortal Love =

Norwegian metal band

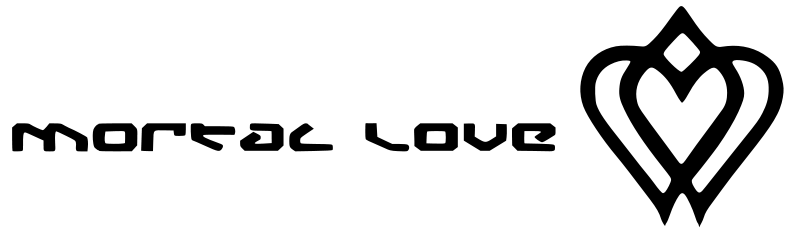

Background information
- Origin: Elverum, Norway
- Genres: Gothic metal
- Years active: 2000–2011 (Hiatus)
- Labels: Massacre Records
- Members: Cat; Lev; Rain6; Damous; Mulciber
- Past members: Gabriah
- Website: Mortallove.com

Mortal Love was a Norwegian metal band from the city of Elverum, formed in 2000. Their sound made combined use of soprano and tenor vocals, whilst placing emphasis on a consistent rhythm section with heavy guitars, piano and synthesizer melodies. Their three released albums, which lyrically dealt with love and failed relationships, were composed as a trilogy, as can be observed by combining their titles — All the Beauty, I Have Lost, Forever Will Be Gone. The band released the final album of the trilogy on 22 September 2006.

On 21 November 2010, the band posted on their Tumblr blog an announcement claiming they had composed over 50 new songs and settled on 10 for the release of a new album. However, it was also stated in the post that their sound had changed, becoming "less guitar-heavy", and that their label Massacre Records had declined to fund the recording and release of the album due to that. The band explained that other options were being explored, such as having the record be a digital-only product or having it recorded and released piecemeal.

On 8 July 2011, Mortal Love's official website was replaced with a note to fans, explaining that the band would go on an indefinite hiatus. Reasons cited for the hiatus included a lack of directional focus and struggles to balance personal lives with a musical career. It was stated that the decision was reached on amicable terms. Before the expiration of their contract with Massacre Records, the label released a best of compilation in November of that year.

After the split, the band's social media outlets continued to be updated with some regularity as of January 2013. Guitarist Rain6 (Lars Bæk) formed the musical project CASCAM, which shies away from heavy metal, instead leaning on a more synthpop sound. Other members have reported being busy with their personal endeavors, though hints of upcoming projects were vaguely given.

As of October 2018, Catherine Nyland and Pål Wasa Johansen have created a new band, Heart of Pandora, and have a new music video.

== Final formation ==
- Cat (Catherine Nyland) – Female vocals
- Lev (Hans Olav Kjeljebakken) – Bass & Vocals
- Rain6 (Lars Bæk) – Guitars & Programming
- Damous (Pål Wasa Johansen) – Drums
- Mulciber (Ole Kristian Odden) – Keyboards & Programming
- Gabriah (Ørjan Jacobsen) – Guitar

== Discography ==
=== Studio albums ===
- All the Beauty... (2002)
- I Have Lost... (2005)
- Forever Will Be Gone (2006)

=== EPs ===
- Adoration (2005)

=== Singles ===
- Adoration (2005)
- Crave Your Love (Acoustic version) (2009)

=== Compilations ===
- Best of the Trilogy... All the Beauty I Have Lost Forever Will Be Gone (2011)
