= Hatrix =

American thrash metal band

Hatrix is an American thrash metal band formed in 1989 and fronted by future-Mushroomhead lead singer Jeff Hatrix, after his departure from Purgatory. First started with (also ex-Purgatory guitarist) Dave Felton's former bandmate from his time in Centurion, Sam Romano on drums. He was replaced by Gary Estok in late 1989, who appeared on "Sins Of A Bastard Angel", the first song released by the band. In early 1990, they solidified the lineup that would last the rest of their career when Estok was replaced by Trëllebörg drummer Steve Felton, and Trëllebörg guitarist Marko Vukcevich was brought in as the 2nd guitarist for their live performances. The band has since released 3 cassette demos, one full-length album called "Collisioncoursewithnoplace" and a compilation of their first 2 demos that was released under several different names (1993's "Hatrix", 1996's "Revolution" and 1998's "Re-Issue"). They have had numerous compilation appearances since their first, "Sins of A Bastard Angel" on the Auburn Records compilation Heavy Artillery, released in January 1990. Hatrix played their first live show at the Phantasy Theater in Cleveland, at the Heavy Artillery Pre-Release Party on December 16, 1989. Hatrix is currently on hold. Hatrix re-united in 2003 for a stint of shows in the Cleveland area lasting until Summer 2004.

The band's debut studio album, Collisioncoursewithnoplace, was released in 1993 via Massacre Records.

== Members ==
- Jeff Hatrix – vocals
- Dave Felton – guitar
- Kevin Skelly – bass, keyboards
- Steve Felton – drums
- Marko Vukcevich – guitar (live only)

=== Ex-members ===
- Sam Romano – drums (previously in Centurion alongside Dave Felton)
- Gary Estok – drums (previously of Sacred Few & Rotterdam)

== Releases ==
- My Asylum (demo) – 1990
- Collisioncoursewithnoplace (demo) – 1993
- Hatrix – 1993 (compilation of My Asylum and Collisioncourse demo tapes)
- Collisioncoursewithnoplace (album) – 1994
- Anotherbadmemory (demo) – 1995
- Revolution (compilation) – 1996 (re-release of My Asylum and Collisioncourse demo tapes)
- Re-issue (compilation) – 1998 (re-release of My Asylum and Collisioncourse demo tapes)

== Compilation appearances ==
- "Sins of a Bastard Angel" – January 1990 – on Heavy Artillery (Auburn Records)
- "Attitudes" – November 1990 – on Distant Thunder: Sounds of the Cleveland Metal Storm (Underground Express Records)
- "Sick of Myself" 1992 – on Dark Empire Strikes Back (Dark Empire Records)
- "It's Not Hard to Hate" – 1994 – on CMG Presents: Hit 'Em Hard (Cleveland Music Group/Jim Clevo Productions)
- "Intimidation" – 1996 – on Industry (Mushroomhead Inc. Records)
- "Freedom" – 1998 – on Mushroomhead Inc. Records Sampler (Mushroomhead Inc. Records)
