= Norway Rock Festival =

Annual music festival in Kvinesdal, Norway

Coordinates: 58°18′28.80″N 6°57′32.72″E

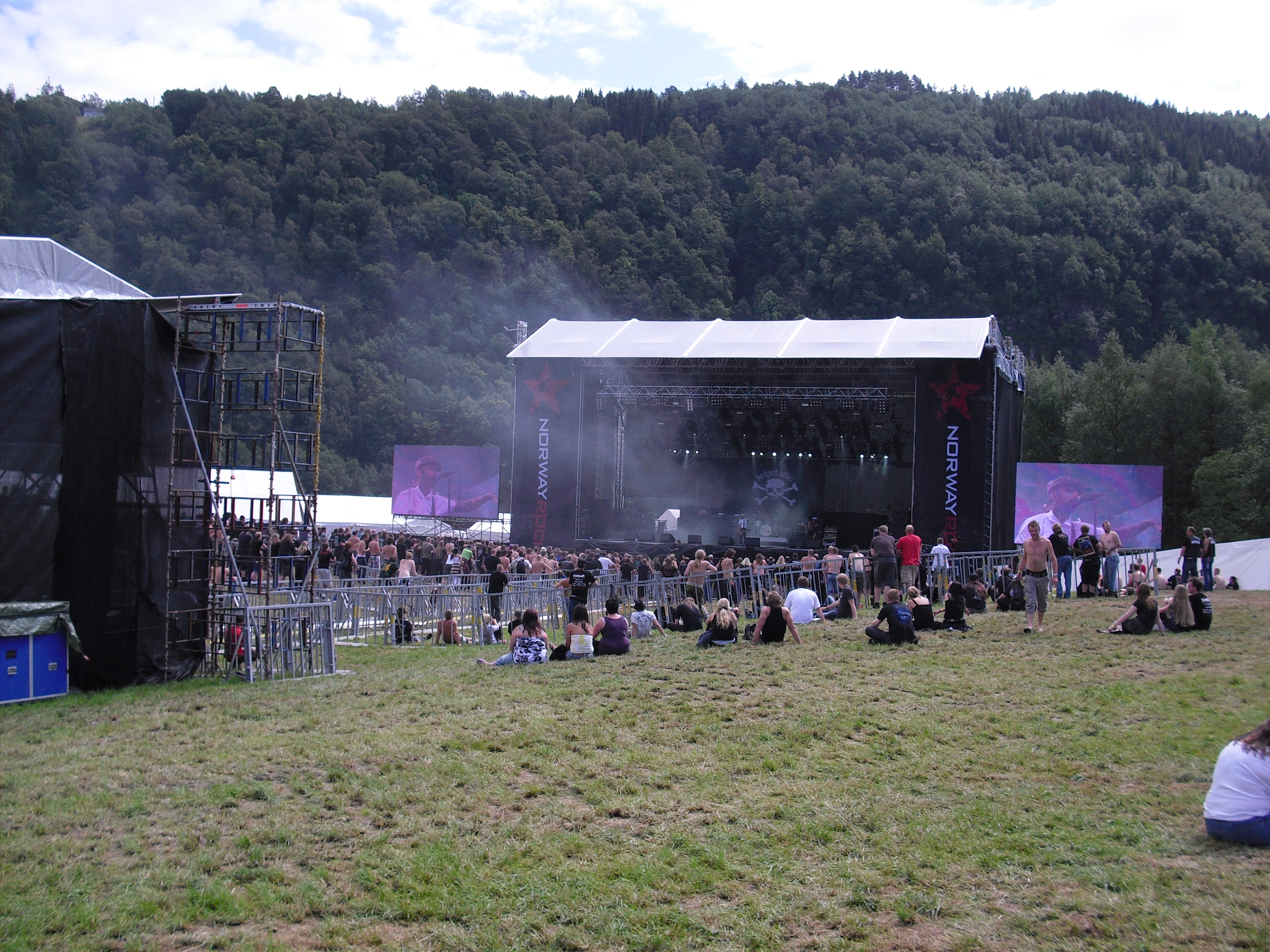
- Genre: Rock, metal
- Dates: July
- Locations: Kvinesdal Municipality, Norway
- Years active: 2006–present

The Norway Rock Festival, formerly known as the Kvinesdal Rock Festival, is an annual rock and metal festival held in Kvinesdal Municipality, Norway since 2006. The 2007 edition took place between 12 and 15 July. At the 2008 festival, two people were found dead near a bus. Initial reports suggested carbon monoxide poisoning as the cause of death. The 2009 edition took place between 9 and 12 July. The 2010 edition took place between 7 and 11 July.

== Lineups ==
=== 2018 ===
- Nightwish

=== 2011 ===
Headlining: Alice Cooper, Volbeat, In Flames

Other performing acts:

- Black Label Society
- The Darkness
- Edguy
- U.D.O.
- Blind Guardian
- Kvelertak
- TNT
- Keep of Kalessin
- Cancer Bats
- Pagan's Mind
- Mercenary
- Luxus Leverpostei
- Ingenting
- The Quireboys
- Black Ingvars
- Crucified Barbara
- Blood Command
- Insense
- Saint Deamon
- Djerv
- Guardians of Time
- Breed
- Mongo Ninja
- Heatseekers
- Ozzmosis
- Trendkill
- Powerride
- Metallicatz
- Teardown

=== 2010 ===
Headlining: Twisted Sister, Slash, Gary Moore, Sebastian Bach

Other performing acts:

- Epica
- Enslaved
- Motörhead
- Megadeth
- Immortal
- Kamelot
- Queensrÿche
- Killswitch Engage
- U.D.O.
- Airbourne
- Cavalera Conspiracy
- DevilDriver
- Amon Amarth
- Jorn
- Bullet for My Valentine
- Saxon
- Anvil
- Over the Rainbow
- Sabaton
- Audrey Horne
- Gamma Ray
- Crashdïet
- Tony Harnell
- Sybreed
- Purified in Blood
- Backstreet Girls
- Rammsund (Rammstein cover band)

=== 2009 ===
- Manowar
- Nightwish
- In Flames
- Sonata Arctica
- Arch Enemy
- Zerozonic
- HolyHell
- W.A.S.P.
- Testament
- Mustasch
- K[Nine]
- Thunderbolt
- Backyard Babies
- Doro
- U.D.O.
- Satyricon
- Skambankt
- Sahg
- Sirenia
- Sister Sin

=== 2008 ===
- Alice Cooper
- Motörhead
- The Quireboys
- Hardcore Superstar
- Turbonegro (canceled at the last minute as a mark of respect to the people who died earlier in the day)
- Volbeat
- Hayseed Dixie
- Helloween
- The Ark
- K[Nine]

=== 2007 ===
- Sebastian Bach
- D-A-D
- TNT
- Kamelot
- Jorn
- Sabaton
- Freak Kitchen
- Skambankt
- The Cumshots
- Carburetors
- Paperback Freud
- Lowdown
- Circus Maximus
- Crucified Barbara
- Communic
- Wig Wam
