= Winter's Verge =

Cypriot power metal band

- Winter's Verge. From left to right: Stefanos, Miguel, George, Chris, Harrys

Background information
- Origin: Nicosia, Cyprus
- Genre: Power metal
- Years active: 2004–present
- Labels: Massacre, Limb Music
- Members: George Charalambous; Harrys Pari; Andreas Kopriva; Miguel Trapezaris; Danny Georgiou
- Past members: Charis Achilleos; Perikles Mallopoulos; Andreas Charalambous; Stefanos Psillides; Chris Ioannides
- Website: Official site

Winter's Verge is a power metal band formed in Nicosia, Cyprus, in 2004. Winter's Verge is one of the best-known bands from Cyprus and one of the few artists signed to an international record label. They have participated in overseas tours, most notably with Finnish band Stratovarius. Their latest album entitled The Ballad of James Tig was released in September 2020 by Pride & Joy Music.

== History ==
George Charalambous had been performing for many years with his band Spirits all over the island, opening for Nightingale and Antimatter amongst other achievements. However, Charalambous could only take the band so far in the geographically restrictive environment. After his military commitments he found a Nicosia based keyboardist, Stefanos Psillides, who had been performing at a local club for a while, playing a style totally different from the one he is currently playing with in the band. Psillides set to work developing his style and technique to fulfil the vision he shared with George for the project, power metal in the vein of bands like Rhapsody of Fire, Sonata Arctica and Stratovarius. The project was initially named Lunar Eclipse. Charalambous and Psillides then searched for the right guitarist that would meet the requirements of their aims, and after many lineup changes they had found Pericles Mallopoulos. Mallopoulos had been playing guitar and singing in other local music venues professionally. He decided to focus more on his guitar playing abilities and joined the band. Larnaca-based drummer Andreas Charalambous was contacted and, sharing similar musical tastes, also joined the band. As it was discovered that the name Lunar Eclipse was already used by another project, the band's name was changed to Winter's Verge.

Along with bassist Charis Achilleos, Winter's Verge recorded a 4-track demo, entitled 'Another Life, Another End', which sold out very quickly. Achilleos then decided to leave the band due to army commitments and a replacement was found in the shape of bassist Miguel Trapezaris, a veteran of the local metal scene and a classically trained musician.

Winter's Verge then entered the studio to record the first full-length album, entitled Another Life...Another End like the demo, as the 4 songs on the demo were re-recorded and modified, along with 5 new tracks. The demo album was distributed to several labels and overseas traders, gaining a respectable underground following.

In May 2007, Pericles and Winter's Verge decided to part ways due to personal issues. The guitarist role was promptly filled after a brief search by Harry Pari, and work resumed with an energetic pace on new material and further developments.

In the summer of 2007, Winter's Verge received an offer for a record contract from Limb Music Products. With the help of Mystic Prophecy singer R.D. Liapakis, the songs on Another Life...Another End were re-worked and a few new tracks added. Being recorded in the Music Factory Studio in Kempten, Germany under the guidance of R.D. Liapakis and Christian Schmid, the new album entitled Eternal Damnation had a far superior sound quality to the demo. The album was released worldwide on 14 March 2008 to mostly positive reviews.

The band supported Mystic Prophecy on their first Cyprus appearance on 22/03/08.

In April 2008 local Cyprus legend Chris Ioannides replaced drummer Andreas Charalambous, who left the band for personal and professional reasons. Charalambous continues to be the webmaster of the band's official site.

In late March 2009, the band re-entered the studio in Germany and recorded their second album, Tales of Tragedy. On 23 November 2009, Winter's Verge parted ways with Limb Music and signed a new record deal with German label Massacre Records. Tales of Tragedy was released on 29 January 2010, while the band was on the road with Stratovarius as support for the Polaris world tour.

On 29 August 2015 they performed as guest stars on the 2015 Cyprus Comic Con, with their families also attending. Winter's Verge also had a booth, where they sold the band's merchandise.

== Influences ==
The main influences of the band are usually cited as power metal and progressive metal bands such as Stratovarius, Symphony X, Rhapsody of Fire, Dream Theater as well as older, more classic bands such as Metallica, Iron Maiden and Manowar. Faint death metal influences are occasionally displayed, with a few growling vocals passages. The individual members cite a wide variety of influences, ranging from Pantera and glam metal to classical music and black metal.

== Members ==
=== Current line-up ===
- George Charalambous - Vocals (2004–present)
- Harry Pari - Guitars (2007–present)
- Miguel Trapezaris - Bass (2006–present)
- Andreas Kopriva Guitars
- Daniel Georgiou - Drums

=== Previous members ===
- Charis Achilleos - Bass (2004–2005)
- Perikles Mallopoulos - Guitars (2004–2007)
- Andreas Charalambous - Drums (2004–2008)
- Stefanos Psillides - Keyboards (2004–2015)
- Chris Ioannides - Drums

== Discography ==
Albums

- Another Life...Another End (demo album, 2006)
- Eternal Damnation (2008)
- Tales of Tragedy (2010)
- Beyond Vengeance (2012)
- IV (2015)
- The Wolves of Tiberon (2017)
- The Ballad of James Tig (2020)

EPs

- Another Life...Another End (2005)
