= Unrest (German band) =

German heavy metal band

Unrest was a German heavy metal band. The band released one album on Massacre Records.

The band was discontinued in 2009.

== Discography ==
- Taste It (1992)
- By the Light of the Moon (1995)
- Watch Out (1997)
- Cold Steel Whisper (1998)
- Restless and L.I.V.E. (live album, 2000)
- Bloody Voodoo Night (2001)
- Back to the Roots (2006, Massacre Records)
