= Thunderbolt (band) =

Norwegian heavy metal band

- Origin: Oslo, Norway
- Genres: Heavy metal
- Years active: 1998−present
- Label: Rock It Up / Icewarrior Records (world)
- Spinoff of: Lash Out
- Members: Tony Johannessen; Geir Marius Halleland; Mathias Eriksson; Per Erik Holt; Marius Haugan
- Past members: Frank Johannessen; Ole Kristian Løvberg; Vegard Waske; Cato Syversrud; Andreas Tylden; Stig Ronny Moe; Morten Eriksen

Thunderbolt is a Norwegian heavy metal band.

== History ==
Thunderbolt, named after the World War II fighter plane Republic P-47 Thunderbolt, was formed in Oslo in 1998 by members of the hardcore group Lash Out. Drummer Vegard Waske, guitarists Frank Johannessen and Andreas Tylden wanted to re-create the sounds of classic rock and metal bands and pair it with the heavier styles of later years. They recruited singer Tony Johannessen and his childhood friend Morten Eriksen as respectively lead singer and bass player.

After releasing their demo Bandits at 6 O'Clock in 2000, Thunderbolt received multiple offers for a record contract and subsequently signed in Scandinavia with Face Front/WME (and Massacre Records outside of Scandinavia) for the release of their 2002 debut album Demons and Diamonds. The album received acclaim in Norwegian and international music press and was even appreciated by the mainstream Norwegian press — rare for a band in this genre. Following the success of Demons and diamonds, the band played several gigs and festivals in Norway, Germany, and Scandinavia from 2003 through 2005.

During the writing of the second album Love and Destruction, lead guitar player Cato Syversrud decided to leave the band. The guitar work on the album recording was played partly by Syversrud, and completed by his replacement, Geir Marius Halleland. Recording and mixing was finished in the summer of 2005, but the album was not released until nearly a year later. Love and Destruction was released on Friday 19. May 2006 and was followed up by a Norwegian tour together with Paul Di'Anno and Masterplan as well as a major European tour supporting King Diamond (May–June 2006). The band also did another European tour with Sabaton during the summer of 2007. Sporadic touring in support of the album continued until 2010.

Some changes to the band lineup was also carried out during the Love and Destruction tours. Drummer Vegard Waske quit the band in 2006 to dedicate more time to his profession as a manager for other bands. He was replaced by Where Angels Fall drummer Ole K Løvberg, who again was replaced by Stig Ronny Moe in 2007. Rhythm guitarist and co-founder Frank Johannessen also decided to retire from music in 2008. His successor was Per E Holt, who had played a number of shows as guitarist for Paul Di'Anno together with Halleland and bassist Morten Eriksen.

Material for the third album was written in between shows throughout 2008 and 2009. Thunderbolt went into Loco Studios in Oslo to start recording in October 2009. All of the recording was completed in the summer of 2010 and the material was sent to Andy LaRocque for mixing and mastering. Artwork for the album was created by Jobert mello, and the album would be released on a new label - Rock It Up Records. The finished album, Dung Idols was out on April 1, 2011.

More changes to the lineup happened in the spring of 2011. Morten Eriksen decided to retire, and left the band along with drummer Stig Ronny Moe. They were replaced by Disiplin and Mindgrinder drummer Marius "Rex Murdoch" Haugan and bass player Mathias Eriksson.

== Current lineup ==
- Tony "Thunder" Johannessen — vocals
- Geir Marius Halleland — guitar
- Mathias Eriksson — bass guitar
- Marius "Rex Murdoch" Haugan — drums
- Per Erik "Pellik" Holt — guitar

== Previous members ==
- Cato Syversrud — guitar
- Vegard Waske — drums
- Ole Kristian Løvberg — drums
- Stig Ronny Moe — drums
- Frank Johannessen — guitar
- Andreas Tylden — guitar
- Morten Eriksen — bass

== Discography ==
- Bandits at 6 O'Clock (demo, 2000)
- Demons and Diamonds (CD, 2002) — Face Front / Massacre Records
- Love and Destruction (CD, 2006) — Massacre Records
- Dung Idols (CD, 2011) — Rock It Up Records
