= Provinssirock =

Rock music festival in Seinäjoki, Finland

Coordinates: 62.76354°N 22.83544°E

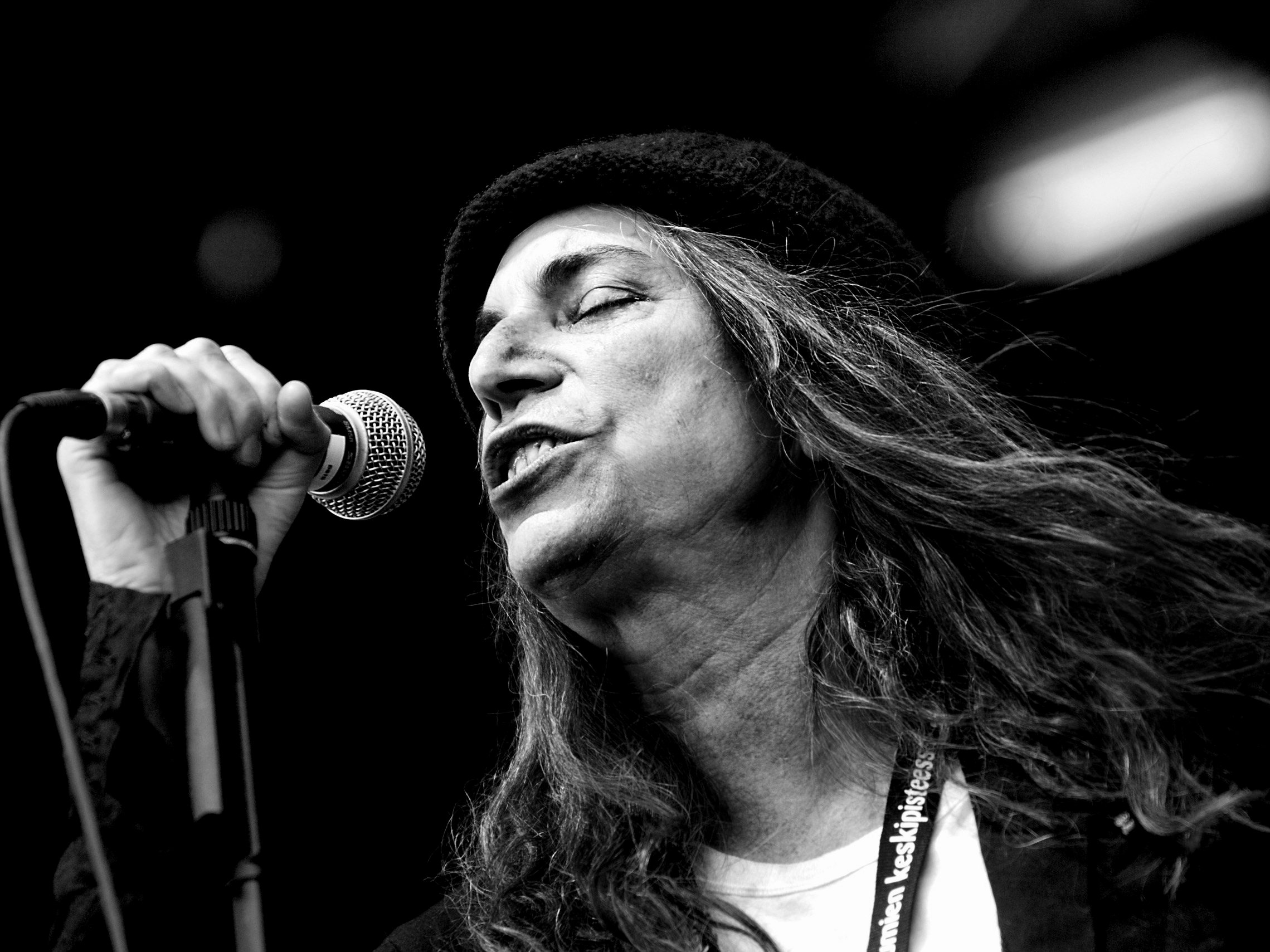
Patti Smith at Provinssirock, 2007

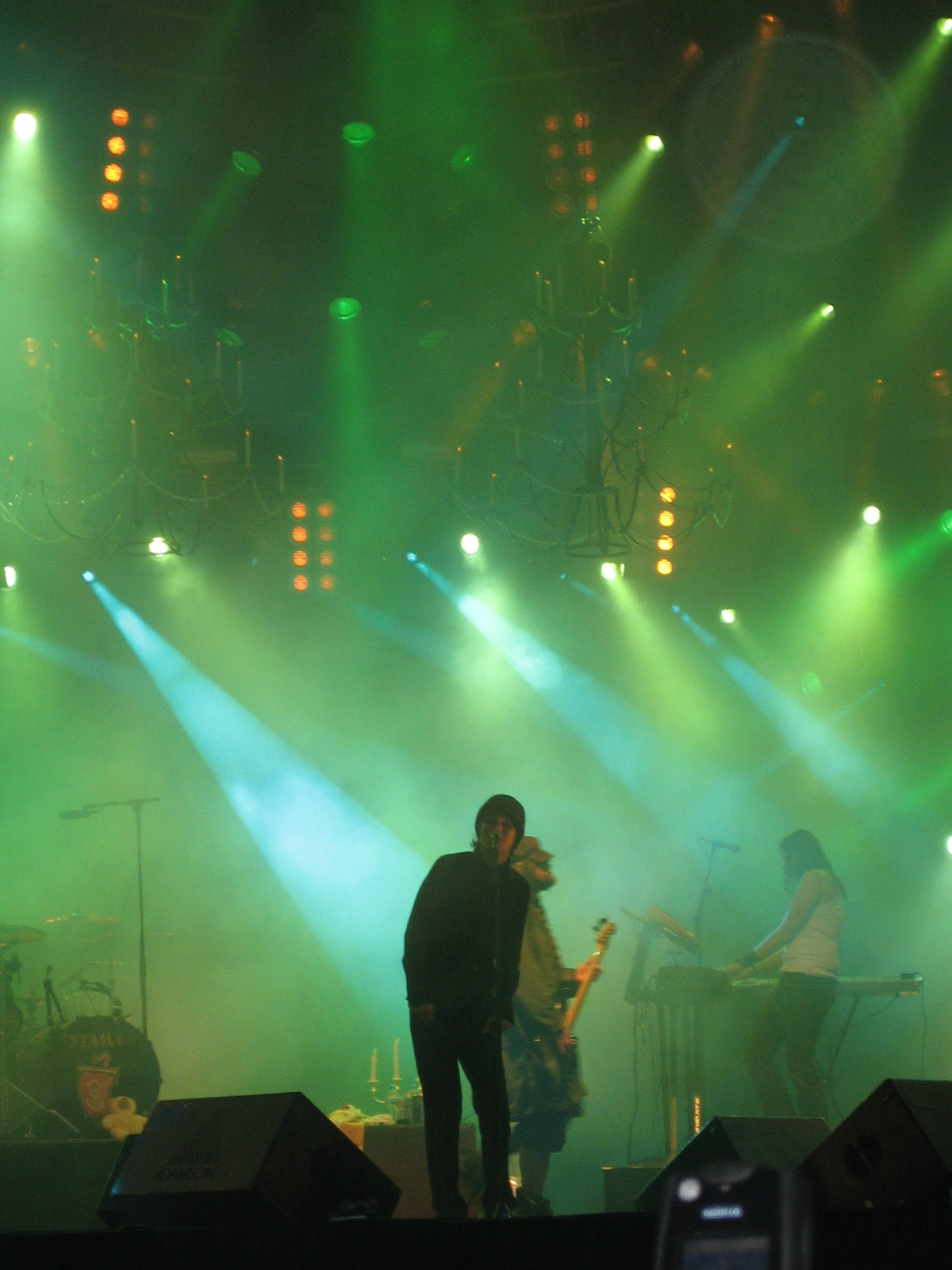
HIM at Provinssirock, 2006

Provinssirock is one of the biggest rock festivals in Finland. It takes place in the city of Seinäjoki in Southern Ostrobothnia, Western Finland. The two- or three-day festival, which starts the busy Finnish rock festival season, has been held every June since 1979.

The 2007 festival had a combined three-day total crowd of 55,000. In 2008 Provinssirock was organised on 13-15 June, and was sold out with a combined three-day total of 75,000 attendees watching bands and rock artists such as Foo Fighters, Linkin Park, Nightwish, The Sounds, Billy Talent and Serj Tankian. Provinssirock was also sold out in 2011, when there were over 84,000 attendees. Headliners were System of a Down, Avenged Sevenfold and Pendulum.

International performers that have previously performed at Provinssirock include:

- Alice in Chains
- Tori Amos
- As I Lay Dying
- Big Country
- Blur (band)
- Children of Bodom
- Bring Me the Horizon
- David Bowie
- Chimaira
- The Cult
- The Cure
- The Pogues
- De La Soul
- Dream Theater
- Faithless
- Faith No More
- Garbage
- Hatebreed
- HIM
- Hüsker Dü
- Kent
- Lamb of God
- Limp Bizkit
- Lou Reed
- Macklemore
- Manic Street Preachers
- Marilyn Manson
- Massive Attack
- Nine Inch Nails
- Paramore
- Placebo
- Iggy Pop
- The Prodigy
- Rage Against the Machine
- Rammstein
- The Ramones
- Red Hot Chili Peppers
- R.E.M.
- Scissor Sisters
- Patti Smith
- The Stone Roses
- Suede
- System of a Down
- Tool
- Turbonegro
- Weezer
- Within Temptation
