= Bråvalla Festival =

Music festival in Sweden

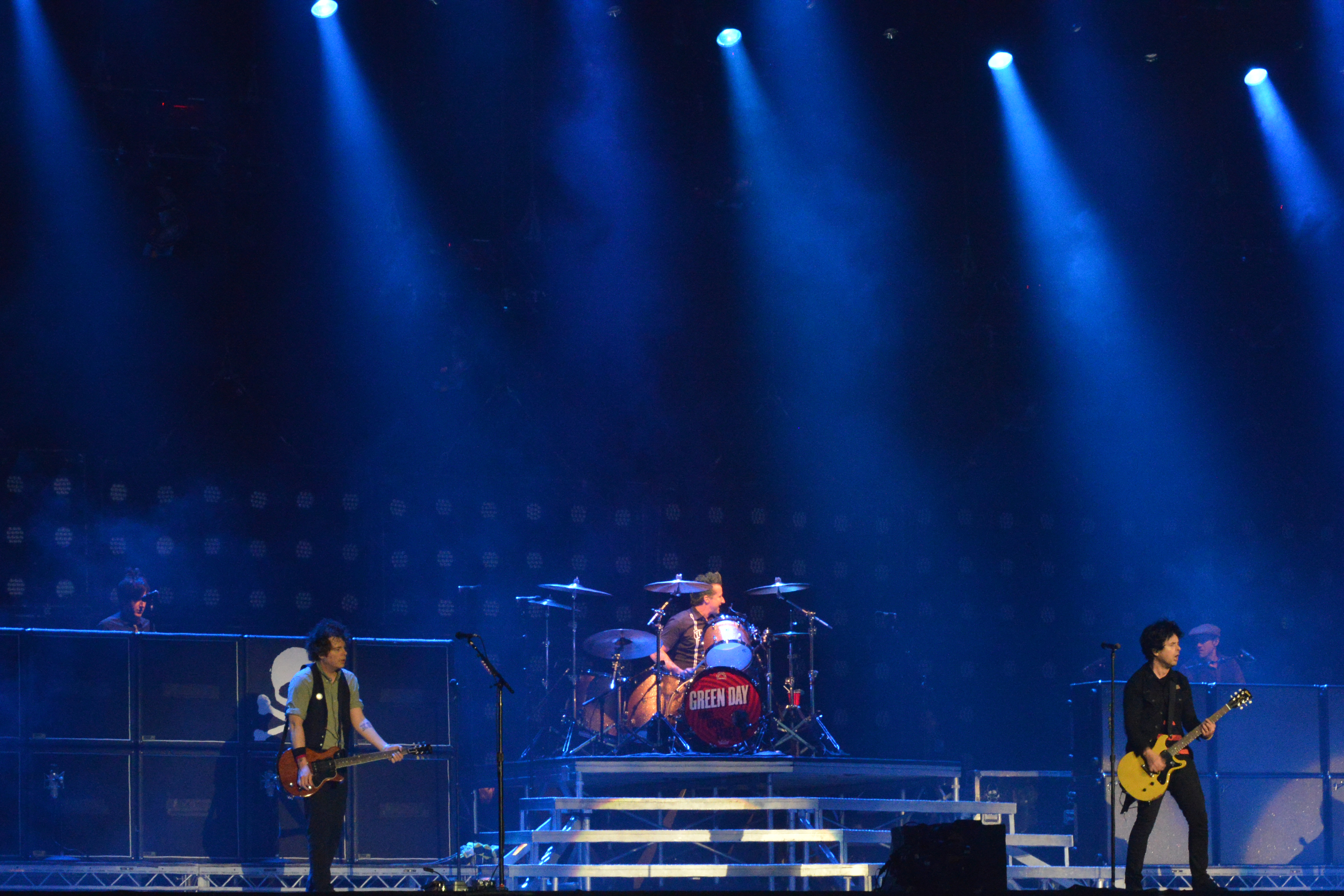
Billie Joe Armstrong and Green Day at the Bråvalla festival in 2013

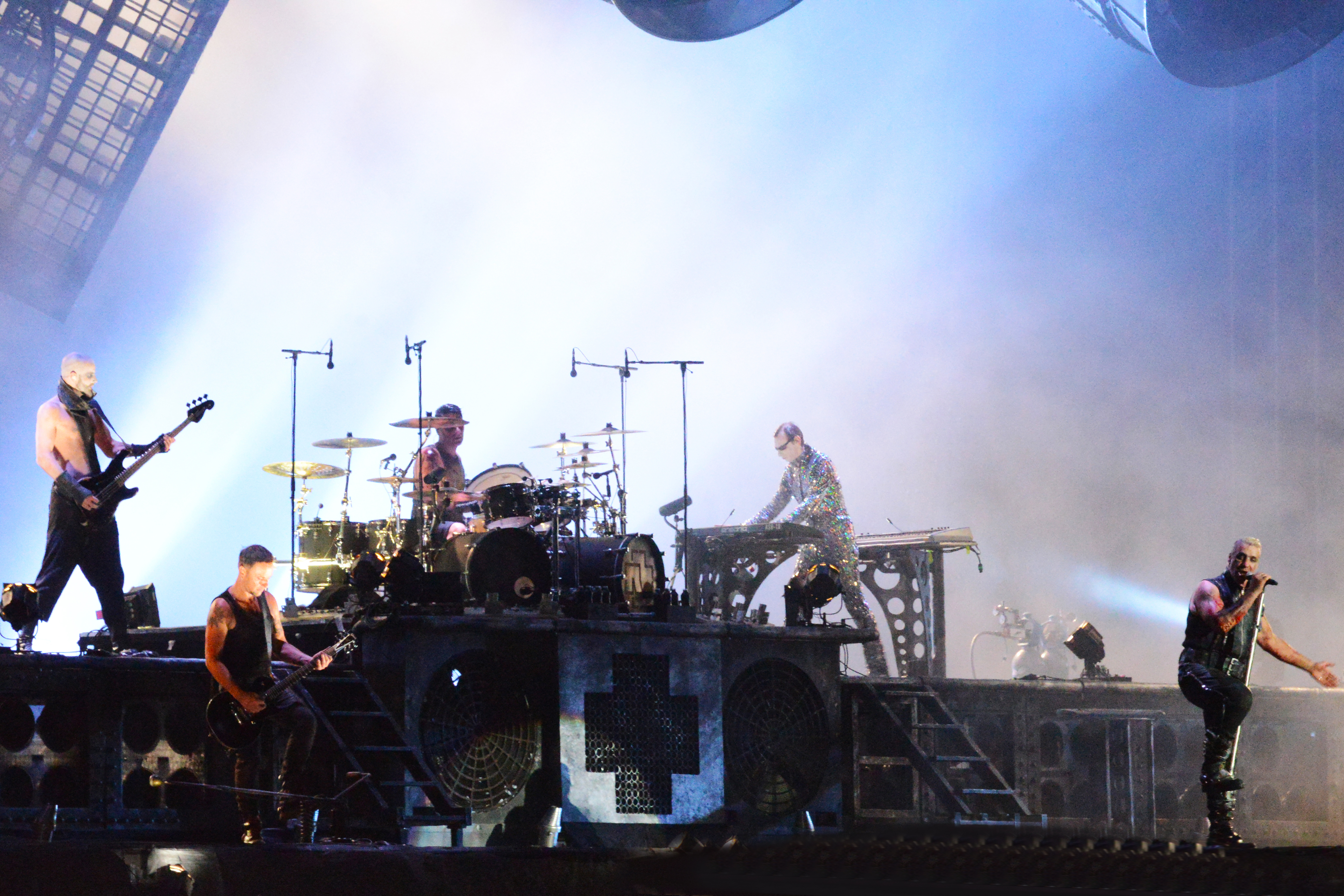
Rammstein at the festival in 2013

Bråvalla Festival was a Swedish four-day music festival that was held annually. It was Sweden's biggest and most popular music festival. It was held at Bråvalla Wing outside of Norrköping. The inaugural season of the festival was from 27 to 29 June 2013. It headlined Rammstein, Green Day and Avicii in additions to tens of artists and acts. The second season was held between the 26 and 28 June 2014 and was headlined by Iron Maiden, Kanye West and Kings of Leon. The third season of the festival was held between 25–27 June in 2015. It was headlined by Robbie Williams, Muse and Calvin Harris. The fourth season was held between 30 June – 2 July in 2016. The fifth and last season was held between 28 June – 1 July in 2017.

The hosts, FKP Scorpio, estimated about 40,000 people would attend the festival in 2013 but eventually 51,590 tickets were sold. This record was again broken in 2014 when 51,683 tickets were sold.

On 27 June 2014, several people were injured during the festival when lightning struck and one person was taken to hospital with life-threatening injuries.

The 2016 and 2017 editions had police reports of several sexual assaults and rapes. In 2015, one man was sentenced by the Göta Court of Appeal for a rape during the 2014 festival. In 2021, a man was sentenced by the same court for a rape during the 2013 festival.

On 1 July 2017, FKP Scorpio announced that Bråvalla will not take place in 2018. In July, it was also announced the festival was cancelled because of police reports of four rapes and 23 sexual assaults that occurred at the event in 2017. In June 2018, the organisers announced no more festivals will be held, citing financial reasons.

== Festival by year 2013–present ==
#	Year	Dates	Guests	Headliners	Notable acts
1	2013	27–29 June	51 590	Avicii, Green Day and Rammstein	Macklemore & Ryan Lewis, In Flames, A Day To Remember, Volbeat, Armin van Buuren, Paramore, The Gaslight Anthem, Mando Diao, Ghost, Bad Religion, Bullet for my Valentine
2	2014	26–28 June	56 071	Iron Maiden, Kanye West and Kings of Leon	Imagine Dragons, Lana Del Rey, Axwell ^ Ingrosso, M.I.A., The Offspring, Alesso, Bring Me the Horizon, Jake Bugg, Bastille, Belle & Sebastian, Sam Smith, Dimitri Vangelis & Wyman
3	2015	25–27 June	50 703	Calvin Harris, Muse and Robbie Williams	In Flames, Kent, Sabaton, Deadmau5, Faith No More, All Time Low, Lars Winnerbäck, Wu-Tang Clan, A Day To Remember, Rise Against, Lamb of God, Major Lazer Zara Larsson
4	2016	30 June – 2 July	52 317	Rammstein, Mumford & Sons and Volbeat	Tenacious D, Zara Larsson, Macklemore & Ryan Lewis, Hardwell, Veronica Maggio, Nightwish, Biffy Clyro, Bring Me the Horizon, Wiz Khalifa, Bullet for my Valentine, Afrojack, Lukas Graham, Editors, Five Finger Death Punch, The 1975, At The Drive-In, Bastille, August Burns Red, Alan Walker
5	2017	28 June – 1 July	45 162	System of a Down, Linkin Park, Martin Garrix, Alesso and The Killers	Sabaton, Suicideboys, Skindred, Rae Sremmurd, Mac Miller, Die Antwoord, Stormzy, Kreator, Travis Scott, Skepta, Scooter, Nause, Yung Lean, Prophets of Rage

== Stages ==
- Panorama – The main stage of the festival.
- Luna – A stage very similar to Panorama when it comes to size.
- Juno – A smaller stage next to Panorama.
- Sensation – This stage is the home of electronic dance music.
- Pacific – A smaller music stage located inside a tent.
- Norrköping Lounge – This stage is an indoor stand-up comedy stage.
