= Nickelsdorf =

- Municipality
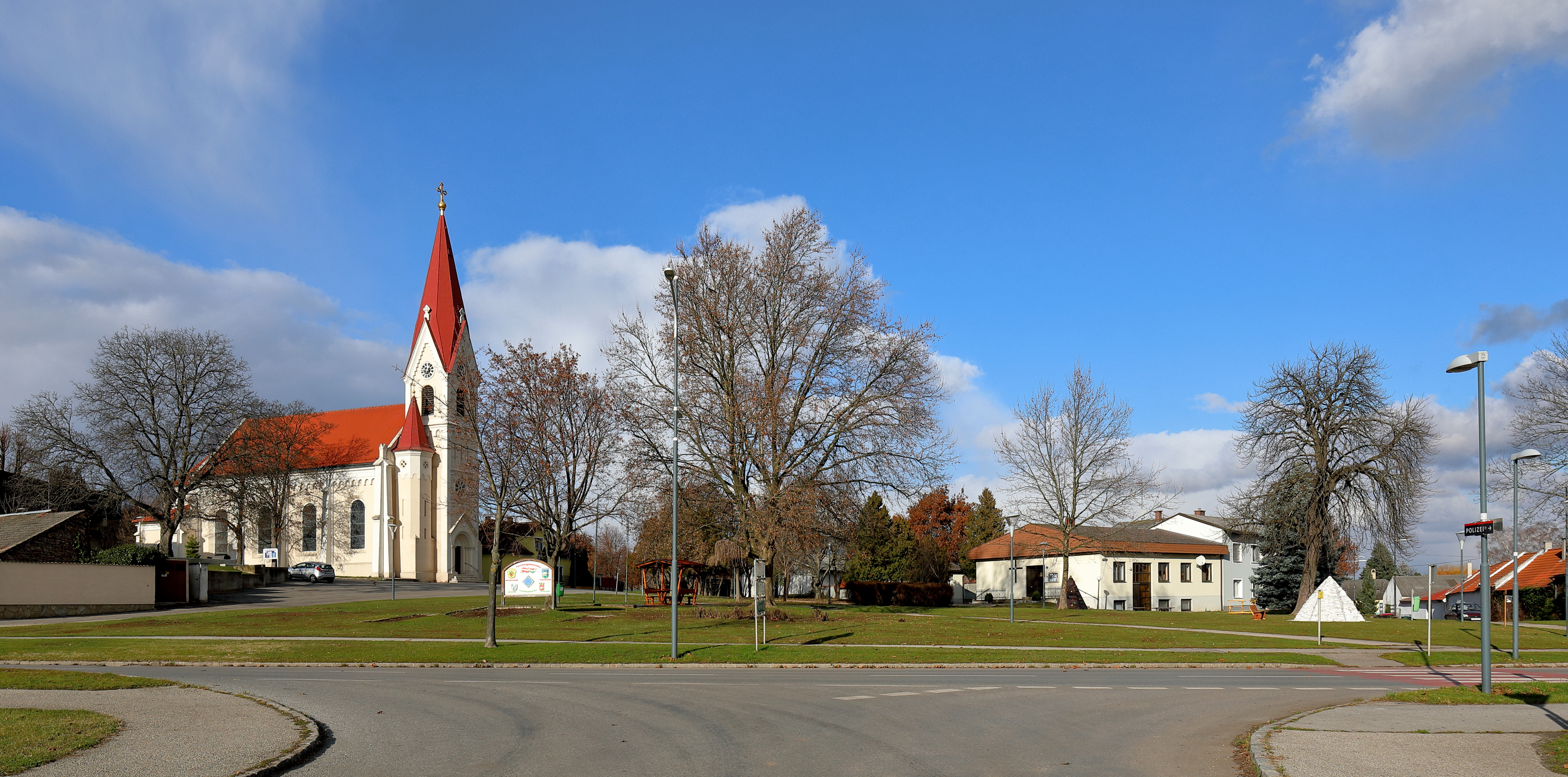

- Coat of arms

- Location within Burgenland Location within Austria
- Coordinates: 47°56′N 17°4′E
- Country: Austria
- State: Burgenland
- District: Neusiedl am See

Government
  - Mayor: Gerhard Zapfl

Area
  - Total: 60.75 km^{2} (23.46 sq mi)

Population (2018-01-01)
  - Total: 1,772
  - Density: 29.17/km^{2} (75.55/sq mi)
- Time zone: UTC+1 (CET)
  - Summer (DST): UTC+2 (CEST)
- Postal code: 2425
- Website: www.nickelsdorf.at

Nickelsdorf (Hungarian: Miklóshalma or Miklóshalom, Croatian: Mikištrof) is a town in the district of Neusiedl am See in the Austrian state of Burgenland.

== Geography ==
Nickelsdorf is the only town in the municipality. It has an important border crossing to Hegyeshalom (German: Straß-Sommerein) in Hungary.

== History ==
The town belonged—like the whole province of Burgenland—to Hungary until 1920, when it became part of the Austrian state of Burgenland.

== Population ==
Historical population
Year	Pop.	±%
1869	1,596	—
1880	1,807	+13.2%
1890	1,782	−1.4%
1900	1,888	+5.9%
1910	1,820	−3.6%
1923	2,129	+17.0%
1934	2,278	+7.0%
1939	2,340	+2.7%
1951	2,225	−4.9%
1961	2,008	−9.8%
1971	1,851	−7.8%
1981	1,649	−10.9%
1991	1,630	−1.2%
2001	1,566	−3.9%
2011	1,608	+2.7%

== Politics ==
The seats on the municipal council are distributed as follows: SPÖ 10, ÖVP 2, Grüne 1, FPÖ 1 and BGL with 5 seats.

== Festivals ==
Since 1985, the annual and internationally famous Jazzfestival Konfrontationen has taken place in Nickelsdorf.

From 9 June to 12 June 2005, the Nova Rock Festival took place in Nickelsdorf with headliners like Die Ärzte, System of a Down, The Prodigy, and Green Day. Every day, there were 30,000 fans in this small village next to the border to Hungary. And one year later in 2006, the Nova Rock Festival drew, with over 50 bands, no less than 150,000 visitors. With famous bands like Iron Maiden, Metallica and Guns N' Roses, it was the largest ever rock festival in Austria.

== Image gallery ==
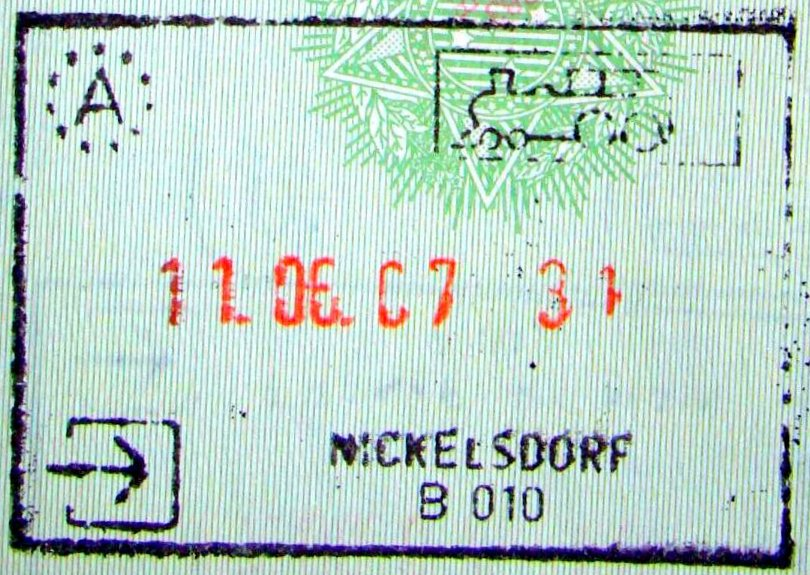
A passport stamp from the border crossing before Hungary joined the Schengen Area

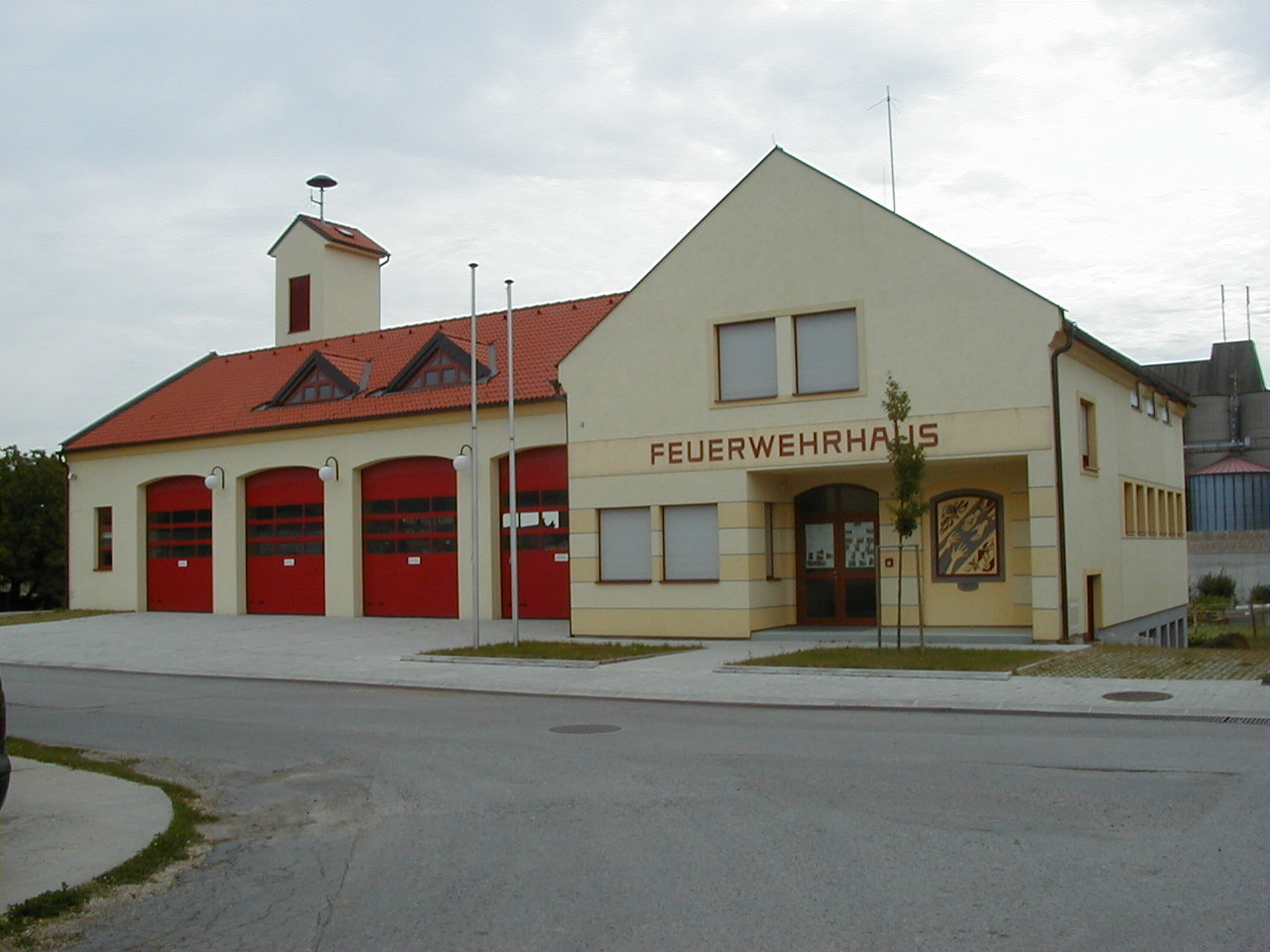
Fire station

== See also ==
- Neusiedl am See District
