= Massacre Records =

German independent record label

- Founded: 1991
- Founder: Torsten Hartmann
- Distributor: Soulfood Music Distribution
- Genre: Heavy metal, hard rock, space rock
- Country of origin: Germany
- Location: Abstatt, Baden-Württemberg, Germany
- Official website: massacre-records.com

Massacre Records is an independent record label based in Abstatt, Germany, specializing in bands from the heavier genres of metal.

The label was founded in 1991 by Torsten Hartmann. Associated with Massacre Records are the marketing and music wholesale company Metal Merchant, the sub-labels Blue Rose Records and Gutter Records, dedicated to the singer/songwriter genre and German metal respectively, and the music publisher Sylvian Music. Massacre Records also distributes albums for the gothic metal label MCM Music.

From 1995 to 2000, Massacre Records operated the sub-label Swanlake Records for its gothic metal and folk metal releases. The most well-known artists published on Swanlake include Skyclad, Atrocity, Theatre of Tragedy, and Liv Kristine.

The best-selling albums released by Massacre Records are: Velvet Darkness They Fear and Aégis by Theatre of Tragedy, and Werk 80 by Atrocity.

== Artists ==
=== Current ===
- Atrophy
- Coronatus
- Crematory
- Dark Embrace
- Darker Half
- Debauchery
- Deliver the Galaxy
- Disbelief
- Embryonic Autopsy
- Eternal Tears of Sorrow
- Hatriot
- Helstar
- Jotnar
- Messiah's Kiss
- Night Legion
- Raunchy
- Seelenwalzer
- Tears of Martyr
- Toxik
- Wizard
- Viper Solfa

=== Unsorted ===
- 5 Star Grave
- Agathodaimon
- Andromeda
- Anvil
- Atargatis
- Atrocity
- Avian
- Axenstar
- Axxis
- Beyond Twilight
- Bleed the Sky
- Bliss
- Casket Co.
- Cage
- Catamenia
- Chain Collector
- Chastain
- Cornerstone
- Darkane
- Darker Half
- Darkseed
- Darzamat
- Das Ich
- Decadence
- Dreamscape
- Echoes of Eternity
- Eisregen
- Elysion
- Evereve
- Exciter
- Experiment Fear
- Falchion
- Fates Warning
- Firewind
- Graveworm
- Halcyon Way
- Hellion
- Highland Glory
- Horizon
- Human Fortress
- Hunted
- Illdisposed
- Jack Frost
- King Diamond
- Kittie
- Lȧȧz Rockit
- Lanfear
- Leatherwolf
- Lethal
- Legion of the Damned
- Liv Kristine
- Maverick
- Majestic
- Majesty
- Mandragora Scream
- Manticora
- Messiah
- Messiah's Kiss
- Metalium
- Moonlight Agony
- Mystic Circle
- Mystic Prophecy
- Narnia
- Night Legion
- Nightqueen
- Node
- Obscurity
- Omen
- One Man Army and the Undead Quartet
- Painflow
- Paragon
- Pink Cream 69
- Pretty Maids
- Prey for Nothing
- Pyramaze
- Raven
- Razorback
- Rebellion
- Requiem
- Rob Rock
- Sacred Steel
- Sandalinas
- Saviour Machine
- Scanner
- Schwarzer Engel
- Seven Witches
- Seventh Avenue
- Siebenbürgen
- Silent Force
- Skyclad
- Solitude Aeturnus
- Steel Attack
- Steel Prophet
- The Awakening
- The Burning
- The Duskfall
- Thunderbolt
- Timeless Miracle
- Totenmond
- Transilvanian Beat Club
- Unrest
- Virgin Black
- Whiplash
- Winterdome
- Winter's Verge
- Wolf
- Wolfchant
- Zero Degree

=== Former ===
- Dark Millennium
- Edenbridge
- Bliss
- Fatal Opera
- Hatrix
- Mortal Love
- Theatre of Tragedy
- Veni Domine
