= List of symphonic metal bands =

This is a list of symphonic metal bands, including bands that at some point in their career played symphonic metal.

== List ==
=== A ===
- Abigail Williams (earlier works)
- Ad Infinitum
- Adagio
- After Forever
- Agathodaimon
- Alia Tempora
- Almora
- Amaranthe
- Amberian Dawn
- Ancient Bards
- Ancient Myth
- Anette Olzon
- Angel Nation
- Angra
- Angtoria
- Anorexia Nervosa
- Antestor
- Apocalyptica
- Arcturus
- Arven
- Atargatis
- Autumn
- Avantasia
- Ave Mujica
- Ayreon

=== B ===
- Bal-Sagoth
- Battlelore
- Believer
- Betraying the Martyrs
- Beyond the Black
- Blackbriar
- Blackthorn
- Blind Guardian
- The Black Mages
- Borknagar

=== C ===
- Carach Angren
- Catharsis
- Ceremonial Castings
- Chthonic
- Coronatus
- Cradle of Filth
- Cross Vein

=== D ===
- The Dark Element
- Dark Moor
- Dark Sarah
- Darkwoods My Betrothed
- Delain
- Devin Townsend Project
- Diablo Swing Orchestra
- Diabulus in Musica
- Dimlight
- Dimmu Borgir
- Divinefire
- Dol Ammad
- Dragonland
- Dragony
- Dreams of Sanity
- Dreamtale

=== E ===
- Edenbridge
- Elis
- Emperor
- Eleine
- Enslavement of Beauty
- Epica
- Eternal Tears of Sorrow
- Evanescence
- Exit Eden
- Eyes of Eden

=== F ===
- Fairyland
- Fleshgod Apocalypse
- Forest Stream
- Forever Slave
- Forgotten Tales
- Furor Gallico

=== G ===
- Galneryus
- Gloryhammer
- Graveworm
- Gwyllion

=== H ===
- Haggard
- HB
- Heavenly
- Hecate Enthroned
- Hevein

=== I ===
- Imperial Age
- Indica
- Ice Nine Kills
- Imminence
- Imperial Circus Dead Decadence

=== J ===
- Jani Liimatainen

=== K ===
- Kamelot
- Katra
- Kerion
- Kingfisher Sky
- Krypteria

=== L ===
- Labirent
- Lacrimosa (newer works)
- Lana Lane
- Last Days of Eden
- Leah
- Leaves' Eyes
- Limbonic Art
- Lorna Shore
- Luca Turilli
- Luca Turilli's Dreamquest
- Luca Turilli's Rhapsody
- Lunatica
- Lux Occulta
- Lyriel

=== M ===
- Magica
- Magic Kingdom
- Majestica
- Make Them Suffer
- Matenrou Opera
- MaYaN
- Mechanical Poet
- Mechina
- Mental Cruelty (newer works)
- Metalwings
- Midnattsol
- Moi dix Mois
- Moonspell
- Myrath

=== N ===
- Nemesea
- Neurotech
- Nightfall
- Nightwish
- Nocturna
- Northern Kings
- Nokturnal Mortum

=== O ===
- Old Man's Child
- Onyria
- Opera IX
- Ov Sulfur

=== P ===
- Pathfinder
- Phoenix Rising
- Powerwolf
- Pythia

=== R ===
- Rage
- ReVamp
- Rhapsody of Fire
- Royal Hunt

=== S ===
- Saille
- Sarah Jezebel Deva
- Satyricon (oldest works)
- Savatage
- Saviour Machine
- Sebastien
- Secret Sphere
- Septicflesh
- Seraphim
- Serenity
- Seven Kingdoms
- Seventh Wonder
- Shade Empire
- Shadow of Intent
- Shaman
- Sirenia
- Sirrah (earlier works)
- Skyfire
- Skillet
- Sonata Arctica
- Sons of Seasons
- Sound Horizon
- Starkill
- Star One
- Starset
- Stormlord
- Stravaganzza
- Stratovarius
- Stream of Passion
- Summoning
- Suspyre
- Symfonia
- Symphony X

=== T ===
- Tarja
- Theatres des Vampires
- Temperance
- Theatre of Tragedy
- Theocracy
- Therion
- Thy Majestie
- Thy Serpent
- Trail of Tears
- Trans-Siberian Orchestra
- Tristania
- Turilli / Lione Rhapsody
- Turisas
- Tungsten
- Tvangeste
- Twilight Ophera
- Twilight Force
- The Sins of Thy Beloved

=== U ===
- Unshine

=== V ===
- Vaakevandring
- Vardøger
- Veni Domine
- Versailles
- Vesania
- Vesperian Sorrow
- Virgin Black
- Virgin Steele
- Visions of Atlantis
- VUUR

=== W ===
- A Wake in Providence (newer works)
- Waltari
- Welicoruss
- Whyzdom
- Wind Rose
- Winds of Plague
- Wintersun
- Within Temptation
- Worm Shepherd

=== X ===
- Xandria
- X Japan
- Xerath

=== Y ===
- Yousei Teikoku

== See also ==
- Neoclassical metal
- Power metal
