= Metalwings =

Bulgarian symphonic metal band

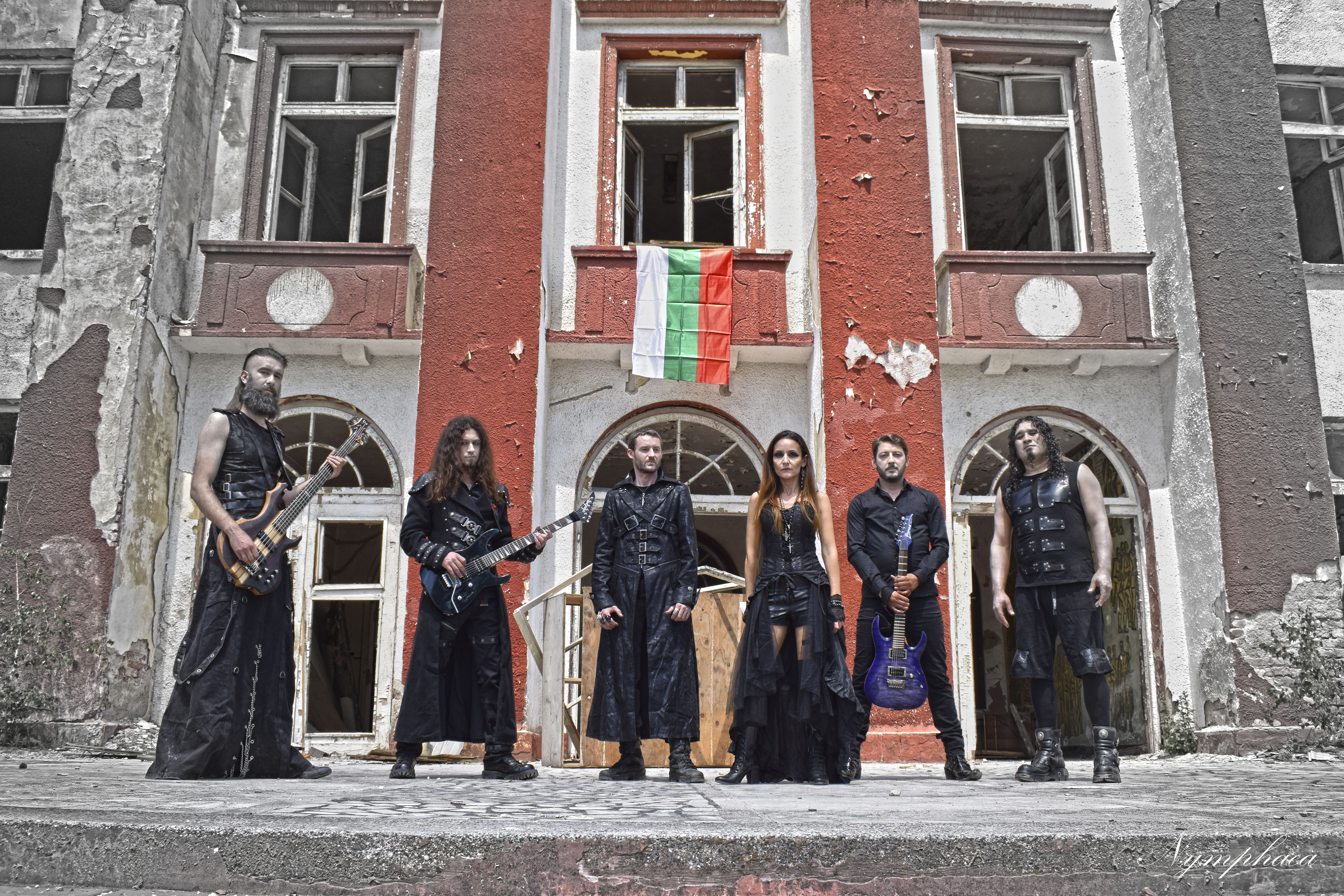
- METALWINGS in 2019. From left to right: Angel Kitanov, Grigor Kostadinov, Stela Atanasova, Nikola Ivanov

Background information
- Origin: Sofia, Bulgaria
- Genres: Symphonic metal; power metal; gothic metal
- Years active: 2010–present
- Label: Independent
- Members: Stela Atanasova; Nikola Ivanov; Grigor Kostadinov; Vlad Enev; Angel Kitanov; Martin Emilov
- Past members: Velislav Uzunov; Emilian Arsov; Boyan Boyadjiev; Konstantin Uzunov; Krastyo Jordanov; Milen Mavrov
- Website: metalwings.eu

Metalwings is a symphonic metal band from Sofia, Bulgaria.

The band was formed in Autumn 2010 by lead singer and songwriter Stela Atanasova. Her idea was to combine elements of classical music with the melodic genres of metal. The style is considered as symphonic gothic metal with female operatic vocals. The band were soon joined by the guitarist and male singer Velislav Uzunov. Drummer Emilian Arsov, bassist Konstantin Uzunov and the keyboardist Angel Kitanov then joined. In December 2013, Metalwings announced Boyan Boyadjiev as Uzunov's replacement. Boyan also took over the male vocalist role previously filled by Uzunov. In December 2014, Boyan Boyadjiev was replaced by Grigor Kostadinov. In November 2015, Metalwings announced Krastyo Jordanov as a second guitarist of the band. After the release of their EP Fallen Angel In The Hell (2016) Metalwings announced Nikola Ivanov (Blackie) as Arsov's replacement. In March 2018, Konstantin Uzunov was replaced by Milen Mavrov. In 2019, the bass player Vlad Enev joined the band.

The band produced the first music video for the song "Crying of the Sun" in the beginning of 2015. The music video had, three years after its release, over 40 million views on YouTube.

On April 27, 2017, Metalwings released the second music video for the song "Fallen Angel In The Hell". On April 19, 2018, Metalwings released their album called For All Beyond. And their third official video for the song "For All Beyond" was released on 1 November 2018 on YouTube.

Between September and November 2020, Metalwings enters the studio to record their second studio album, which is expected to be released in the spring of 2021. On December 23, 2020, Metalwings released their brand new single “Monster in the Mirror”. The single is mixed and mastered by Jens Bogren at Fascination Street Studios. On March 13, 2021, Metalwings released the official music video of "Monster in the Mirror" on YouTube., which is the first single taken from their upcoming album A Whole New Land.

== Biography ==
=== Formation (2010) ===
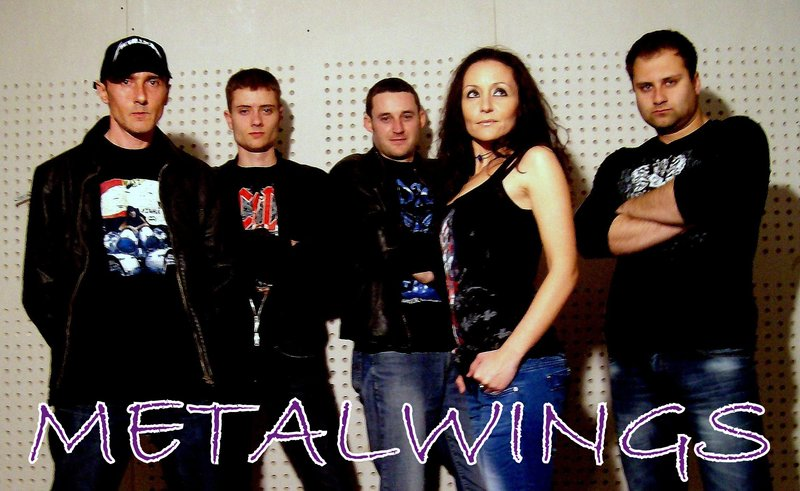
METALWINGS in December 2010. From left to right: Emilian Arsov, Konstantin Uzunov, Angel Kitanov, Stela Atanasova, Velislav Uzunov

The band was founded in Autumn 2010 by classically trained vocalist Stela Atanasova. Stela's idea was to combine elements of classical music with the melodic genres of metal. The style is considered as Symphonic, Gothic metal with female fronted operatic vocals.

Soon the band was joined by the guitarist and male singer Velislav Uzunov, the drummer Emilian Arsov, the bassist Konstantin Uzunov and the keyboardist Angel Kitanov. For the last seven years the band has played on many gigs and participated in many festivals, some of which are: “Rock Festival” in Slivnitsa – 2011; "Rock 2 Night" festival in Route 80 – 2012; "Rock Revival" festival in Cherven Briag – 2012; International Moto Fest "Night Wolves" - 2012, 2013 and 2015; Rock Fest "Berkstock" – 2012; Concert in Kiustendil – 2013; “The Power of Rock” - 2013 and 2015; “Polinero Rock Fest” in Plovdiv – 2014; Concert with the Croatian band AngelSeed in Sofia – 2014; Promotional concert for the band's first official video in Joy Station – 2015; Participation in "Wacken Oper Air Metal Battle" – 2015; Promotional concert for the band's first EP in Joy Station – 2016; “Eleshnitza Rock Fest” – 2017. Promotional concert for the band's debut album “For All Beyond” at Mixtape – 2018; Promotional video for the song “For All Beyond” at Sofia Live Club – 2018. Tour with Imperial Age in Vienna, Cluj-Napoca, Bucharest and Sofia, March 2019. Concert with Bucovina in Brasov, March 2019.

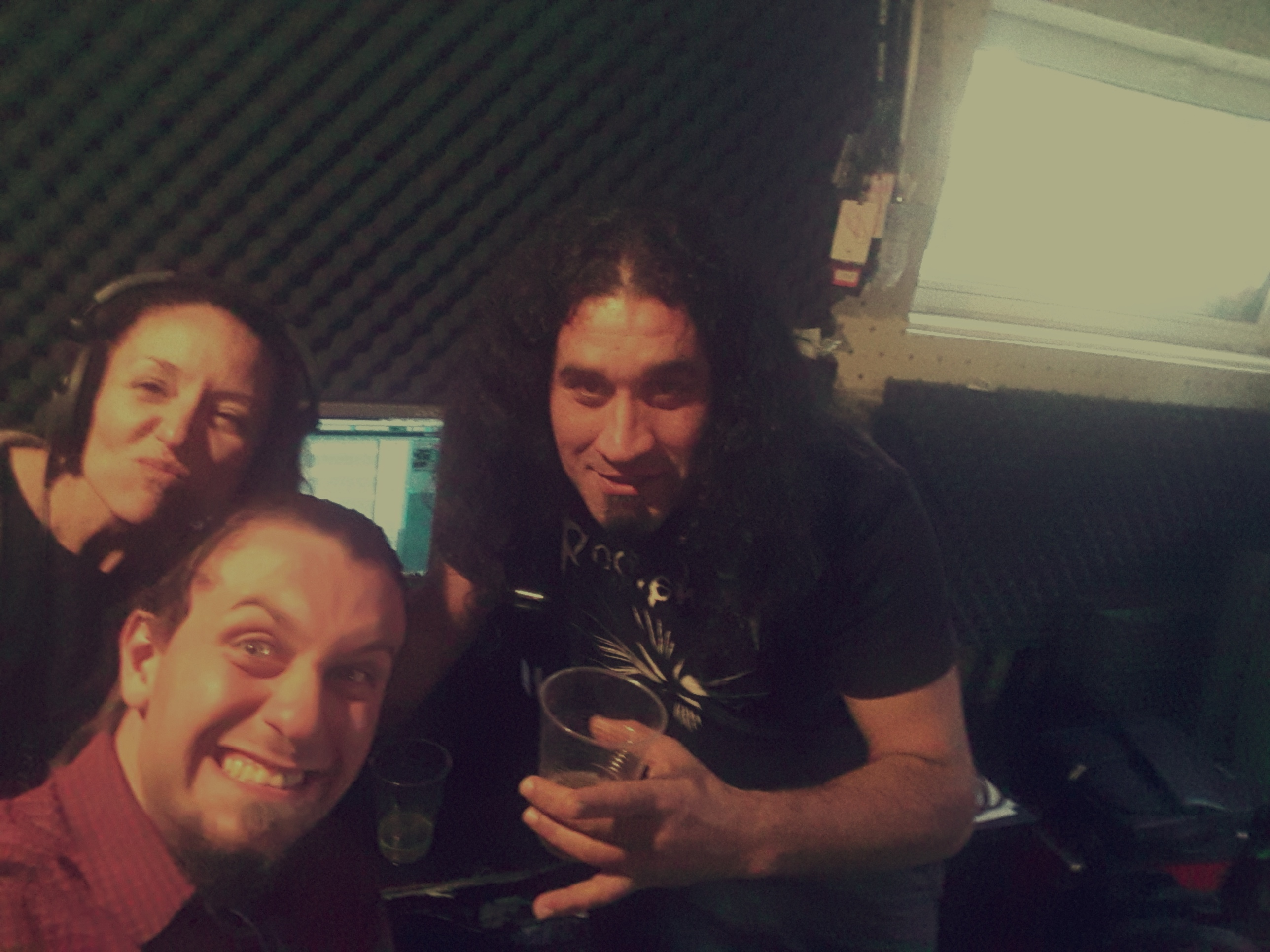
In the recording studio in September 2017

In 2015, the band showed the world that music that is highly appreciated by millions of people all over the world can be produced in Bulgaria with their beautiful and epic official video of the song "Crying of the Sun". The video of "Crying of the Sun" was filmed in Belogradchik - directed by Peter Tomov and Velislava Gospodinova. Male vocals in the song were sung by the first guitarist of the band Velislav Uzunov who had left the band three months before making the video. In the video, male vocals are performed by Konstantin Uzunov (Bass). On May 12, 2016, Metalwings released their first EP, Fallen Angel In The Hell. After that there were a series of interviews for several metal webzines and radios, including Conexion Rock Radio which has thousands of listeners from Latin America. In this EP the band presented four songs - "Fallen Angel In The Hell", "Slaves Of The Night", "Ship Of Shadows" and "Immortal Metal Wings". The song "Crying Of The Sun", which was released as a single in 2012, was featured in the EP as a bonus track.

On 27 April 2017, Metalwings released their second official video for the song "Fallen Angel In The Hell”. The video was filmed above the Cave called God's Eyes - directed by Peter Tomov.

Metalwings started to record their second studio album on 21 August 2017. In November 2017, Metalwings recorded with the Sofia Session Orchestra the symphonic parts of the song “For All Beyond” which is the lead song of the album For All Beyond. They released it on 19 April 2018. The album is mixed and mastered by Max Morton at Morton Studio – Ukraine.

On 1 November 2018, Metalwings released their third official music video for the title song "For All Beyond", directed by Peter Tomov, assistant director Ivailo Stanchev.

In March 2019, Metalwings joined Imperial Age European tour as a special guest in Austria, Romania and Bulgaria.

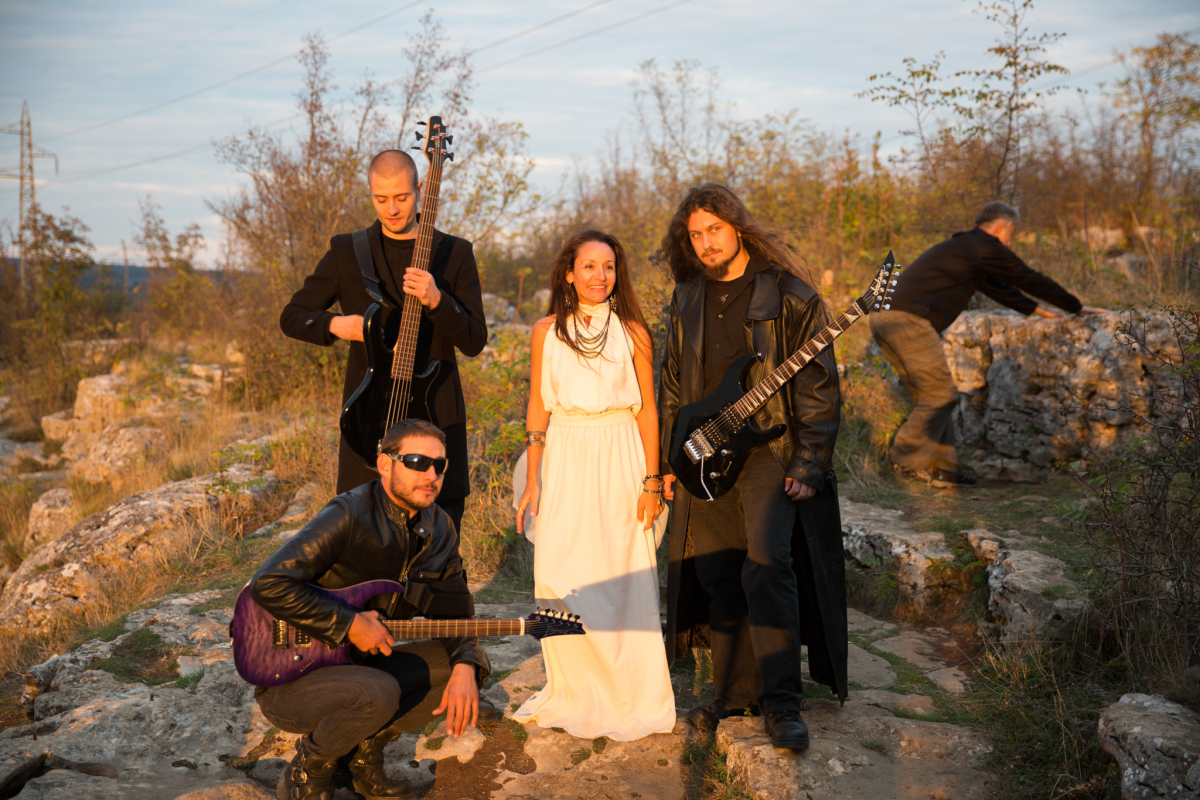
Behind the scenes of Fallen Angel in the Hell in October 2016

On December 23, 2020, Metalwings released their brand new single “MONSTER IN THE MIRROR”! The single is mixed and mastered by Jens Bogren at Fascination Street Studios. On March 13, 2021, Metalwings released the official music video of "MONSTER IN THE MIRROR", the first single taken from their upcoming album.

== Members ==
Current members

- Stela Atanasova – Lead vocals, Electric Viola, Keyboards, Piano (2010–present)
- Nikola Ivanov – Drums (2016–present)
- Grigor Kostadinov – Lead Guitar (2014–present)
- Vlad Enev – Bass (2019–present)
- Angel Kitanov – Keyboards (2010–present)
- Martin Emilov – Rhythm Guitar (2021–present)

Former members

- Velislav Uzunov – Guitar, Vocals (2010–2013)
- Boyan Boyadjiev – Guitar, Vocals (2013 - 2014)
- Emilian Arsov – Drums (2010–2016)
- Konstantin Uzunov – Bass (2010–2017)

Timeline

== Discography ==
- Fallen Angel In The Hell (EP, 2016)
- For All Beyond (Album, 2018)
- A Whole New Land (Album, 2021)

=== Singles ===
- Crying of the Sun (2015)
- Realm of Dreams (2015)
- Second Chance (2015)
- Still Believe in Us (2020)
- Monster in the Mirror (2020)

== See also ==
- List of heavy metal bands
- List of symphonic metal bands
- Symphonic gothic metal
- Symphonic metal
- Symphonic power metal
