= Legend Trilogy =

Legend

Studio album by Saviour Machine
- Released: 1997 (Legend I); April 6, 1998 (Legend II); July 5, 2001 (Legend III:I); 2011 (Legend III:II)
- Recorded: June-October 1996 (Legend I); October-December 1997 (Legend II); 1999-2000 (Legend III:I); 2002-2003 (Legend III:II)
- Genres: Symphonic gothic metal, art rock
- Length: 77:48 (Legend I); 79:22 (Legend II); 78:11 (Legend III:I); 77:07 (Legend III:II)
- Labels: Massacre Records (Legend I, Legend II, and Legend III:II); MCM Music (Legend III:I)
- Producer: Eric Clayton

Saviour Machine chronology
Saviour Machine II (1994)	Legend (1997)

Professional ratings
Review scores
Source	Rating
Cross Rhythms	7/10 (Legend I and Legend II)
Darkscene.at	10/10 (Legend III:I)
Rock Hard	9.5/10 (Legend I); 8/10 (Legend II); 8.5/10 (Legend III:I); 10/10 (Legend III:II)

The Legend Trilogy is a trilogy of studio albums by American gothic metal band Saviour Machine, consisting of the band's third, fourth, and fifth albums; Legend I, Legend II, and Legend III:I. Although it is considered a trilogy, the band made demos for a continuation to Legend III:I in 2002 and 2003, entitled Legend III:II. The album has not been officially completed, but Massacre Records released the demos as an album without the band's permission in 2011.

== Track listing ==
Legend I track listing
No.	Title	Length
1.	"Overture"	4:42
2.	"A Prophecy"	1:50
3.	"I Am"	0:59
4.	"Legend I:I"	2:42
5.	"The Lamb"	2:28
6.	"The Eyes of the Storm"	6:09
7.	"The Birth Pangs"	6:17
8.	"The Woman"	5:53
9.	"The Night"	5:08
10.	"The Sword of Islam"	6:30
11.	"Gog: Kings of the North"	8:02
12.	"The Invasion of Israel"	5:07
13.	"World War III - The Final Conflict I"	1:48
14.	"Ten - The Empire"	5:10
15.	"Legend I:II"	2:41
16.	"The Beast"	5:35
17.	"Antichrist I"	6:47

Legend II track listing
No.	Title	Length
1.	"The Covenant"	8:50
2.	"The Whore of Babylon"	5:17
3.	"Legend II:I"	1:28
4.	"The False Prophet"	3:58
5.	"Mark of the Beast"	4:03
6.	"Antichrist II: The Balance of Power"	8:00
7.	"World War III - The Final Conflict II"	3:53
8.	"Behold a Pale Horse"	3:53
9.	"The Martyrs Cry"	4:30
10.	"The Promise"	10:35
11.	"The Sixth Seal"	4:55
12.	"Legend II:II"	1:31
13.	"The Holy Spirit"	1:42
14.	"The Bride of Christ"	4:10
15.	"Rapture: The Seventh Seal"	6:56
16.	"War in Haven - The Second Fall"	5:41

Legend III:I track listing
No.	Title	Length
1.	"Twelve Hundred Sixty Days"	7:26
2.	"Revelation 13"	6:08
3.	"Legend III:I"	1:17
4.	"The Ancient Serpent"	4:06
5.	"Abomination of Desolation"	4:39
6.	"Image of the Beast"	3:58
7.	"Anti-Christ III: The King of Babylon"	7:03
8.	"The Final Holocaust"	5:23
9.	"Two Witnesses"	3:41
10.	"Three Angels"	2:53
11.	"Four Trumpets"	3:30
12.	"The Locusts"	4:55
13.	"The Sixth Judgement"	2:55
14.	"The Dead Sea"	3:39
15.	"Rivers of Blood"	2:33
16.	"The Plague and the Darkness"	4:33
17.	"The Fall of Babylon"	5:10
18.	"The End of the Age"	4:22

Legend III:II track listing
No.	Title	Length
1.	"Kings of the East"	3:20
2.	"The Trinity Abyss"	3:49
3.	"World War III - The Final Conflict III"	4:17
4.	"Megiddo - Center of the Earth"	3:39
5.	"Armageddon - The Valey of Decision"	12:24
6.	"King of Kings"	7:03
7.	"Death of the Slain: The Bottomles Pit"	3:40
8.	"A Thousand Years"	2:41
9.	"The Final Rebellion"	4:09
10.	"Lake of Fire: The Last Rebellion"	2:46
11.	"The Great Throne"	4:33
12.	"Heaven and Earth"	4:24
13.	"The Holy City - New Jerusalem"	3:52
14.	"Marriage of the Lamb"	4:17
15.	"Legend III:II"	1:33
16.	"The Ancient of Days"	4:36
17.	"The Beginning and the End"	6:04

== Personnel ==
Saviour Machine

- Eric Clayton – vocals
- Jeff Clayton – guitars
- Charles Cooper – bass
- Nathan Van Hala – keyboards
- Jayson Heart – drums (Legend I and Legend II)
- Victor Deaton – drums (Legend III:I)
- Thomas Weinesjö – drums (Legend III:II)

Additional musicians (Legend III:I and Legend III:II)

- Carl Johan Grimmark – guitars
- Chad Hunley – percussion
