= Fifth Element (Pathfinder album) =

Studio album by Pathfinder
- Released: May 23, 2012
- Genre: Power Metal, Symphonic Metal
- Length: 60:33 (European); 60:53 (Japanese)
- Label: Sonic Attack Records
- Producer: Mariusz Pietka

Pathfinder chronology
Beyond The Space, Beyond The Time (2010)	Fifth Element (2012)

Fifth Element is the second studio album by Polish Symphonic Power Metal band Pathfinder. It was released in Asia May 23, 2012 (This time through Avalon Sounds) and to the rest of the world May 26 (still through Sonic Attack), and included region-specific bonus tracks. On March 22, the band announced a poll that was to decide which of four original tracks off the upcoming album Fifth Element was to be released early as a taste of the new album. The song Elemental Power won and was made public through the band's YouTube channel on March 23. The album features 13 tracks and continues Pathfinder's tradition of symphonic power metal. On 2 December 2013 their album Fifth Element was "album of the month" according to the German website "HardHarderHeavy".

== Track listing ==
No.	Title	Length
1.	"Ventus Ignis Terra Aqua"	2:05
2.	"Fifth Element"	8:46
3.	"Ready to Die Between Stars"	5:50
4.	"The Day When I Turn Back Time"	6:20
5.	"Chronokinesis"	5:31
6.	"March to the Darkest Horizon"	7:52
7.	"Yin Yang"	4:03
8.	"Elemental Power"	4:33
9.	"Ad Futuram Rei Memoriam"	5:04
10.	"When the Sunrise Breaks the Darkness"	6:19
11.	"Vita"	1:34
12.	"If I Could Turn Back Time" (Cher Cover; Japanese Only Bonus Track)	4:56
13.	"Spartakus and the Sun Beneath the Sea" (European Bonus Track)	4:36
Total length:		62:25

== Personnel ==
- Simon Kostro - Lead Vocals
- Karol Mania - Lead & Rhythm Guitars
- Krzysztof Gunsen Elzanowski - Rhythm & Lead Guitars
- Kacper Stachowiak - Drums
- Bartosz Ogrodowicz - Keyboards
- Arkadiusz E. Ruth - Bass

=== Guest musicians ===
- Agatha Lejba-Migdalskiej - Soprano
