= Beyond the Space, Beyond the Time =

Studio album by Pathfinder
- Released: 14 April 2010
- Genre: Power metal, symphonic metal
- Length: 71:53
- Label: Radtone Records; Sonic Attack Records
- Producer: Mariusz Pietka

Pathfinder chronology
Beyond the Space, Beyond the Time (2010)	Fifth Element (2012)

Professional ratings
Review scores
Source	Rating
MetalStorm	8.1/10 stars
Metal Temple	8/10 stars
Sputnikmusic	4.5/5 stars

Beyond the Space, Beyond the Time is the debut album by Polish power/heavy metal band Pathfinder. The album was co-produced by the sound engineer Mariusz Pietka and Pathfinder, and was originally released to Asian audiences through Radtone Records on April 14, 2010 and later, worldwide through Sonic Attack Records.

The band's first music video, for the song The Lord of Wolves, was released on 15 March 2011.

== Track listing ==
1. "Deep Into That Darkness Peering..." – 3:23
2. "The Whisper of Ancient Rocks" – 5:53
3. "Vita Reducta Through The Portal" – 1:00
4. "Pathway to The Moon" – 6:52
5. "All The Mornings of The World" – 5:04
6. "The Demon Awakens" – 6:10
7. "Undiscovered Dreams" – 5:00
8. "The Lord of Wolves" – 6:40
9. "Sons of Immortal Fire" – 5:12
10. "Stardust" – 8:30
11. "Dance of Flames" – 1:02
12. "To The Island of Immortal Fire" – 5:06
13. "Beyond The Space, Beyond The Time" – 10:34
14. "What If..." – 1:28
15. "Forever Young (Alphaville Cover) (Japan Bonus Track)" – 5:34

== Personnel ==
=== Pathfinder ===
- Simon Kostro – lead vocals
- Karol Mania – lead & rhythm guitars
- Krzysztof Gunsen Elzanowski – lead & rhythm guitars
- Kamil Ruth – drums
- Bartosz Ogrodowicz – keyboards
- Arkadiusz E. Ruth – bass

=== Guest musicians ===
- Agatha Lejba-Migdalskiej – soprano
- Michał Jelonek – violin
