= Angel Nation =

Finnish symphonic metal band

Angel Nation is a Finnish symphonic metal band who originally went by Enkelination until 2016. The band formed in 2011, releasing a debut EP in 2012. As of 2022, the band released three albums and an EP.

== Band members ==
Current

- Elina Siirala - lead vocals, keyboards (2011-present)
- Lucas Williamson - drums (2016-present)
- George Stergiou - rhythm guitar (2018-2021), lead guitar (2021-present)
- Nick Wilson - bass guitar (2022-present)

Former

- Ben Welburn - drums (2011-2013)
- Shadow Venger - lead guitar (2011-2016)
- Ivan Melo - rhythm guitar (2011-2012)
- Alasdair McNeill - bass guitar (2013-2014)
- Jozef Polom - rhythm guitar (2013-2014)
- Julia B. Cadau - bass guitar (2014-2022)
- Benjamin Tarten - drums (2014-2016)
- Sonny Antoniou - lead guitar (2017-2021)

== Discography ==
=== Albums ===
- Tears of Lust (2014)
- Aeon (2017)
- Antares (2022)

=== Singles/EPs ===
- Never Ending (2012)
- Do it Anyway (2017)
- Burn The Witch (2017)
- Breathe Again (2017)
- Fly Away (2021)
- Seraph (2022)
- Out of Sight, Out of Mind (2022)
