= Onyria =

Italian rock music group

- Origin: Bolzano, Italy
- Genres: Alternative rock; post grunge; gothic rock; symphonic metal; symphonic rock; heavy metal
- Years active: 2012–present
- Label: Onyria Records
- Members: Helena (Elena Pinna); Simon J. Gillman; John Andreu; Antoine Del Vicario; Valérian Fourmy
- Past members: Patrick Raffeiner; Benjamin Kiem; Alessandro Magnani; Flo Magagnosc
- Website: http://www.onyria-music.com

Onyria is an Italian hard rock band from Bolzano, Italy. It was formed in 2012 by vocalist Helena (Elena Pinna) and guitarist Simon J. Gillman. The band released one studio album and eight singles under the label Onyria Records. Their first album, Break The Silence, was released on February 19, 2015. All of Onyria's video clips, albums and recordings are self-produced by members of the band. On June 18, 2016, Onyria announced changes in its name line-up and genre. Present and future productions by the group will be released under the name Hellektra. On December 16, 2016, Onyria announced that they would reform with the original line-up and will continue to write and perform songs. A release date for their new single, 'Alone', was set to January 9, 2017. Onyria announced a release date for their second album, Feed The Monster, set to July 19, 2022.

== Musical style ==
Onyria's musical style has been described using multiple metal and rock styles such as modern rock, symphonic metal, symphonic rock, gothic rock and heavy metal. The band's music includes "crushing" riffs, double bass drum patterns and a use of symphonic elements such as strings, violins, choirs and grand piano. Vocally, Onyria used a combination of both singing and growls.

Onyria has been compared to bands such as Evanescence, Nightwish and Within Temptation.

=== Influences ===
Onyria have stated that, in general, they are influenced by musical groups including Nightwish, Queen, Alter Bridge and Evanescence. They have also stated that they are partly influenced by singers such as Celine Dion and Whitney Houston.

In an interview with The Somber Lane Blog, Simon J. Gillman stated he was influenced by a whole range of music genres and bands like Imagine Dragons, Alter Bridge, Queen, Shinedown, Linkin Park, Scale the Summit, Monuments, Tool, Porcupine Tree, Hans Zimmer and E.S. Posthumus.

=== Lyrical themes ===
According to the band, lyrical themes in the album Break The Silence include introspection, love, hate, revenge, hopelessness, anger and spirituality. According to reviewers, Lagrimas De Cinixiu, which is sung in Italian and features rapper Alisandru Sanna, make reference to fires and arsons that annually destroy many areas in Sardinia which is the hometown of singer Helena.

== Band members ==
Current members

- Helena (Elena Pinna) — main vocals (2012–present)
- Simon J. Gillman — guitars, backing vocals (2012–present) bass, drums, keyboards (2012–2014) (2016–2022)
- Valérian Fourmy – bass (2022–present)
- John Andreu – guitars (2022–present)
- Antoine Del Vicario – drums (2023–present)

Former members

- Patrick Raffeiner — drums (2015)
- Benjamin Kiem – bass (2015–2016)
- Alessandro Magnani – drums (2015–2016)
- Flo Magagnosc – drums (2022–2022)

== Discography ==
Studio albums

- Break The Silence (2015)
- Feed The Monster (2022)
