= Symphonic gothic metal =

Music genre

- Stylistic origins: Symphonic metal; gothic metal; doom metal
- Cultural origins: Early to mid 1990s, United States, Norway and the Netherlands

Symphonic gothic metal is a subgenre of gothic metal that emerged in the 1990s and incorporates symphonic and orchestral elements.

== History ==
The genre was first pioneered by American band Saviour Machine with their 1993 debut album Saviour Machine I. This style would be expanded upon in the rest of the band's discography including Saviour Machine II and the Legend series of albums. One of the first gothic metal bands to release a full album featuring "beauty and the beast" vocals, where death metal vocals are contrasted with clean female vocals, was the Norwegian Theatre of Tragedy in 1995. From then on after the departure of lead singer Liv Kristine in 2003, she and her future husband, Alexander Krull, formed the symphonic metal band Leaves' Eyes. The band is one of the pioneers of the "beauty and the beast" vocal style. The contrasting styles of vocals are also sometimes performed by only one vocalist, an example of this being Ambre Vourvahis of Xandria, combining and layering her clean (and occasionally operatic) vocals with her deep gutturals on the band's 2023 album The Wonders Still Awaiting. Other bands, such as the Dutch Within Temptation in 1996, expanded on this approach. A debut album Enter was unveiled in the following year, followed shortly by an EP The Dance. Both releases made use of the beauty and beast approach delivered by vocalists Sharon den Adel and Robert Westerholt. Their second full-length Mother Earth was released in 2000 and dispensed entirely with the death metal vocals, instead "relying solely on den Adel's majestic vocal ability". The album was a commercial success with their lead single "Ice Queen" topping the charts in Belgium and their native Netherlands. Their third album The Silent Force arrived in 2004 as an "ambitious project featuring a full orchestra and 80-voice choir accompanying the band". The result was another commercial success across Europe and introduced "the world of heavy guitars and female vocals" to "a mainstream audience".

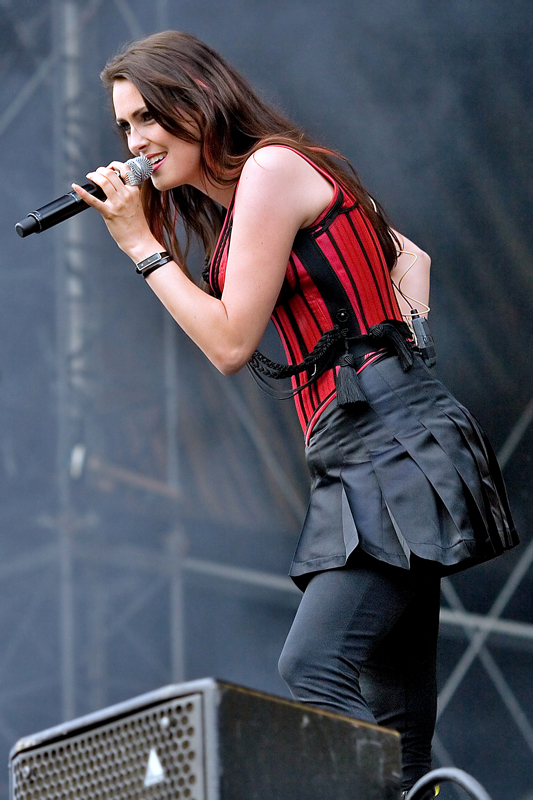
Sharon den Adel of Within Temptation, one of the most commercially successful bands in symphonic gothic metal

Within Temptation's brand of gothic metal combines "the guitar-driven force of hard rock with the sweep and grandeur of symphonic music". The critic Chad Bowar of About.com describes their style as "the optimum balance" between "the melody and hooks of mainstream rock, the depth and complexity of classical music and the dark edge of gothic metal". The commercial success of Within Temptation has since resulted in the emergence of a large number of other symphonic gothic metal bands, including fellow Norwegian pioneers of the genre, Trail of Tears.

After Forever released their debut album Prison of Desire in 2000, described as "a courageous, albeit flawed first study into an admittedly daunting undertaking: to wed heavy metal with progressive rock arrangements and classical music orchestration — then top it all off with equal parts gruesome cookie-monster vocals and a fully qualified opera singer". A second album Decipher followed in 2001 with music that was described by guitarist Sander Gommans as being in the style of Within Temptation. Founding member, guitarist and vocalist Mark Jansen departed After Forever only a few months after the release of this album. Jansen would go on to form Epica, another band that performs a blend of gothic and symphonic metal. A debut album The Phantom Agony emerged in 2003 with music that combines Jansen's death grunts with the "angelic tones of a classically trained mezzo-soprano named Simone Simons, over a lush foundation of symphonic power metal". The music of Epica has been described as a combination of "a dark, haunting gothic atmosphere with bombastic and symphonic music". Like Within Temptation and After Forever, Epica has been known to make use of an orchestra.

This blend of symphonic and gothic metal has also been arrived at from the opposite direction. The band Nightwish from Finland began as a symphonic power metal act before introducing gothic elements on their 2004 album Once, particularly on the single "Wish I Had an Angel". They continued to mix their style of "bombastic, symphonic and cinematic" metal with a gothic atmosphere on their next albums Dark Passion Play in 2007 and Imaginaerum in 2011. In the book Rough Guide to Heavy Metal, Essi Berelian describes Nightwish as "gothic film score metal". The Swedish group Therion also introduced gothic elements to their brand of symphonic metal on their 2007 album Gothic Kabbalah.

== See also ==
- List of symphonic metal bands
- List of gothic metal bands
