= WWE Day of Reckoning =

2004 video game

- North American cover art featuring Trish Stratus, Triple H and Randy Orton
- Developer: Yuke's
- Publishers: WW: THQ; JP: Yuke's
- Platform: GameCube
- Release: NA: August 30, 2004; EU: September 17, 2004; AU: September 24, 2004; JP: January 13, 2005
- Genre: Sports (fighting)
- Modes: Single-player, multiplayer

WWE Day of Reckoning is a 2004 professional wrestling video game developed by Yuke's and released for the GameCube console by THQ. The game is based on World Wrestling Entertainment, and many of the wrestlers who were on the WWE roster at the time of release were included as player characters. The game also features the option to create wrestlers.

The game's single-player mode involves the player guiding a created wrestler through the ranks as a rookie and into main event stardom on either of WWE's brands Raw or SmackDown!.

The game received positive reviews and its story was continued in a 2005 sequel WWE Day of Reckoning 2.

== Gameplay ==
The game features a control system similar to that of AKI's Nintendo 64 wrestling games, with weak/strong grappling attacks and strikes. Players can also counter to their opponents' attacks with a timed button press. One of the game's unique features is the "Momentum Shift" move — a desperation attack that gives a character an instant advantage during the match. The game's Exhibition mode allows players to wrestle in various match types including Hell in a Cell and Iron Man matches. The game's Story Mode allows players to take a created wrestler from WWE developmental to main event status by achieving various goals during matches.

== Plot ==
The player creates a new WWE developmental superstar and assumes their role in the game. The created superstar starts off as a new wrestler signed to a WWE developmental contract attempting to work his way up to the main roster, working matches on non-televised house shows against fellow up-and-comers. After this series of matches and storyline cutscenes, the superstar is allowed to perform on Sunday Night Heat, before he is finally allowed to join the main roster. There are two different brands to choose from, Raw or SmackDown!, each with their own distinct roster of wrestlers. As an effect, this will also choose which stable they will join. Choosing Raw results in joining Triple H's Evolution, and choosing SmackDown! results in joining The Undertaker's New Ministry.

The superstar goes on and works his way up the "rungs of the ladder" in a series of matches, ultimately resulting in the acquisition of the show's World Championship. If the player has chosen Raw, the player will pursue the World Heavyweight Championship. If SmackDown! was chosen, then the player will pursue the WWE Championship.

As the story progresses, Triple H or The Undertaker starts kicking people off the team as they fail him or (as in the case of the created superstar) become a threat to his championship. The final battle is an Iron Man match at WrestleMania XX for the championship.

The story is continued in the sequel, WWE Day of Reckoning 2, though under the assumption that the superstar chose Raw.

== Reception ==
Reception

Aggregate score
| Aggregator | Score |
|---|---|
| Metacritic | 79/100 |

Review scores
| Publication | Score |
|---|---|
| Electronic Gaming Monthly | 5.67/10 |
| Famitsu | 29/40 |
| Game Informer | 8.25/10 |
| GamePro | 4.5/5 stars |
| GameRevolution | B |
| GameSpot | 8.2/10 |
| GameSpy | 4/5 stars |
| GameZone | 8/10 |
| IGN | 8.3/10 |
| Nintendo Power | 4/5 |
| X-Play | 4/5 stars |
| Maxim | 8/10 |
| The New York Times | (average) |

GameSpot's Alex Navarro lauded the game for its improved story mode and graphics compared to the WWE's previous GameCube game WWE WrestleMania XIX, as did IGN's Matt Casamassina. However, both sites found fault with the game's limited selection of wrestlers. The game itself received "favorable" reviews according to video game review aggregator Metacritic. In Japan, Famitsu gave it a score of one eight, one seven, one eight, and one six, for a total of 29 out of 40.

== Sequel ==
The game was followed by a sequel released in 2005, titled WWE Day of Reckoning 2. Unlike most other WWE games, Day of Reckoning 2 continues the story mode plotline of Day of Reckoning.

== See also ==
- List of licensed wrestling video games
- List of fighting games
