= Labirent =

Turkish rock/metal band

- Labirent at the Opening Concert of the 1996 World Air Games

Background information
- Origin: Ankara, Turkey
- Genres: Progressive rock, progressive metal, symphonic rock
- Years active: 1987–present
- Members: Serhat Koçak; Yavuz Selim; Volkan Ünlüer; Tolga Tecer; Levent Ünal
- Past members: Levent Atici; Gurcan Konanc; Emin Guven; Koray Ozturk; Fethi Okutan

Labirent (Labyrinth in English) is a progressive rock/metal band formed in Ankara, Turkey, in 1987. In the early period of rock music in Turkey, when the style was considered strange, Serhat Koçak and Yavuz Selim Sarıcı founded Labirent and introduced progressive rock to the Turkish music market. In 1992, guitarist Volkan Unluer joined the band, creating its present shape. They achieved success in 1997 with their first album Çağın Harikası ("Miracle of the Century"). They made a symphonic rock performance “which was a first in Turkey” performing with a Gazi University Symphony Orchestra on the Turkish National TV Channel TRT. As of 2011 the band members were pursuing solo projects.

== Band members ==
- Vocals: Serhat Koçak
- Keyboards: Yavuz Selim
- Guitars: Volkan Ünlüer
- Bass: Tolga Tecer
- Drums: Levent Ünal

Former Members

- Levent Atici
- Gurcan Konanc
- Emin Guven
- Koray Ozturk
- Fethi Okutan

== Music ==
Labirent's songs themes are mostly freedom, liberty, life and human rights. Labirent is the only band in Turkey that has song expressing and concerning Atatürk. The band's aim is to present an artistic perspective for the improvement of their community.

Labirent are working on combining their members’ music and artistic projects as a “Triple Project of Labirent” concept to make another first in Turkish Rock Music History.
