= Pathfinder (band) =

Polish symphonic power metal band

- Origin: Poznań, Poland
- Genres: Symphonic metal, power metal
- Years active: 2006–present
- Labels: Sonic Attack Records, Radtone Records, Avalon Records
- Members: Przemysław Uliczka; Arkadiusz Ruth; Gunsen; Karol Mania; Kacper Stachowiak; Bartosz Ogrodowicz
- Past members: Kamil Ruth; Slawek Belak; Simon Kostro

Pathfinder is a Polish symphonic power metal band. As of 2012, the band has released two full-length albums and collaborated and toured with widely known power metal acts such as Power Quest and Labyrinth. The band's musical style has been described as consisting of "sweeping keyboard orchestrations, chugging riffs, blinding guitar solos, frantic rhythms, and soaring vocals".

== Biography ==
=== 2006–2009: Early years and demos ===
Pathfinder was formed in Poznań, Poland in 2006 by bassist/composer Arkadiusz E. Ruth and guitarist Karol Mania with the aim of creating a combination of film-score music, classical music, and a "wide scope of metal". Following the band’s inception, the founding members began composing original music and searching for additional musicians. By 2007, the band’s lineup had been completed with the acquisition of guitarist Gunsen, vocalist Simon Kostro, keyboardist Slavomir Belak, and drummer Kamil Ruth. In the same year, the band created its first demo, the eponymous Pathfinder. 2008 saw the independent release of a 4-track demo CD entitled The Beginning to positive reviews from the international metal world. Following this, the band toured extensively, appearing at several festivals around their home country of Poland. Owing to the success of The Beginning, in 2009 the band toured with Iron Maiden's ex-vocalist Paul Di'Anno and Norwegian Thunderbolt – a formative event in the band's history.

=== 2009–2011: Beyond the Space, Beyond the Time ===
In the year 2009, Pathfinder had begun collaborating with producer/sound engineer Mariusz Pietka from MP Studio in Częstochowa. Here, the band decided to work on their debut album. In the studio, the band was joined by several guest musicians, including vocalists Roberto Tiranti (Labyrinth), Bob Katsionis (Firewind), Matias Kupiainen (Stratovarius), and operatic soprano Agata Lejba-Migdalska, who had accompanied the band since their early days and would become a recurring collaborator.

As a pre-album release, in the same year 2009, Pathfinder independently published a power metal cover of Mike Oldfield's Moonlight Shadow via their YouTube channel. The efforts in the studio culminated in Pathfinder's first professional full-length album Beyond the Space, Beyond the Time, released 14 April 2010 to Asian audiences through Radtone Records and later, in 2011, worldwide through Sonic Attack Records. The band's first music video, for the song Lord of Wolves off of Beyond the Space, Beyond the Time, was released on 15 March 2011.

=== 2011–present: Fifth Element and on ===
In early 2011, drummer Kamil Ruth left the band and was replaced by Kacper "Drum Kid" Stachowiak. In December 2011, Pathfinder announced that all compositions for a second studio album, which would continue the lyrical story of Beyond The Space, Beyond The Time, had been completed and that the band was back in the studio. On 21 March 2012, Pathfinder revealed that the second studio album was to be entitled Fifth Element and announced its Asian and worldwide release dates (23 May and 26 May, respectively) as well as its track listings including region-specific bonus tracks. On 22 March, the band announced a poll that was to decide which of four original tracks off the upcoming album Fifth Element was to be released early as a taste of the new album. The song Elemental Power won and was publicized through the band's YouTube channel on 23 March. In May, Pathfinder announced that shooting would soon begin for a music video for a song from Fifth Element, and that the expected release date for the video was August or September 2012. On 23 May 2012, Pathfinder's second full-length studio album Fifth Element was released in Asia (through Avalon Sounds), and the worldwide release followed on 26 May (through Sonic Attack Records). The album features 13 tracks including the European bonus track Spartakus and the Sun beneath the Sea (cover song) and the Japanese bonus track If I Could Turn Back Time (Cher cover) and continues Pathfinder's tradition of symphonic power metal.

Throughout late May and early June, Pathfinder continued to release the tracks from Fifth Element for free through their YouTube channel. On 25 March 2013 it was announced on the band's official Facebook page that Simon Kostro had left the band due to loss of communication with the other band members.

On 5 October 2017 the band released a new version of the title track Fifth Element featuring new vocalist Przemysław Uliczka.

== Band members ==
=== Current ===
- Przemysław Uliczka – vocals (2014–present)
- Arkadiusz E. Ruth – bass, composition, orchestration (2006–present)
- Karol Mania – guitars (2006–present)
- Krzysztof "Gunsen" Elzanowski – guitars (2007–present)
- Kacper Stachowiak – drums (2011–present)
- Bartosz Ogrodowicz – keyboards (2012–present)

=== Former ===
- Kamil Ruth – drums (2006–2011)
- Slavomir Belak – keyboards (2007–2012)
- Simon Kostro – vocals (2007–2013)

Timeline

== Discography ==
=== Extended plays and demos ===
- Pathfinder (Demo, 2007)
- The Beginning (Demo, 2008)

=== Studio albums ===
- Beyond the Space, Beyond the Time (2010)
- Fifth Element (2012)

=== Singles ===
- Moonlight Shadow (Mike Oldfield cover) (2009)

== Videography ==
=== Music videos ===
- Beyond the Space, Beyond the Time

- The Lord of Wolves (2011)

- Fifth Element

- Ready To Die Between Stars (2013)

== Reception ==
Pathfinder has received significant praise from metal critics. They have been described as "a professional unit of amazing artists" and "the world’s best epic power metal band". The band has been compared to several more well known acts in the genre, one reviewer saying, "Pathfinder tests the speed barrier Dragonforce so often pushes against and almost gives the Brits a run for their money," and, "at times Pathfinder almost sounds "elemental", as if they transcend the limits of music like I have only heard Lost Horizon do before". Another said that "it is no exaggeration to state that if it wasn’t for Rhapsody, Pathfinder could have easily been the leading act of the genre". Pathfinder has also received criticism. One reviewer wrote, "Sadly, there are a few flaws to be found in Pathfinder’s sound. My main quarrel is with the overly long instrumental sections that the band is fond of incorporating in their songs; most end up sounding dull and stray too far from the main portions of the song in question" and also noted that the band's musical style "isn’t a very original one when considering its individual parts," though "it’s remarkable that multiple styles of power metal are pulled off while still retaining Pathfinder’s signature symphonic sound".

On 2 December 2013, their album Fifth Element was "album of the month" according to the German website "HardHarderHeavy".
