= Saviour Machine II =

Studio album by Saviour Machine
- Released: July 1994
- Recorded: March 25 - June 15, 1994
- Studio: The Mixing Lab
- Genres: Gothic metal, heavy metal, progressive metal
- Length: 76:05
- Label: Intense Records
- Producer: Eric Clayton

Saviour Machine chronology
Saviour Machine I (1993)	Saviour Machine II (1994)	Legend I (1997)

Professional ratings
Review scores
Source	Rating
Cross Rhythms	8/10
Metal Storm	8.5/10
Powermetal.de	10/10
Rock Hard	10/10

Saviour Machine II is the second studio album by American metal band Saviour Machine, released on 1994.

== Track listing ==
No.	Title	Length
1.	"Saviour Machine I"	6:50
2.	"The Gates"	0:30
3.	"Enter the Idol"	4:09
4.	"The Hunger Circle"	5:11
5.	"Child in Silence"	6:26
6.	"Ascension of Heroes"	6:30
7.	"Paradox"	1:28
8.	"The Stand"	16:07
9.	"American Babylon"	7:29
10.	"Ceremony"	8:46
11.	"Overture"	1:12
12.	"Love Never Dies"	5:52
13.	"Saviour Machine II"	5:33

== Personnel ==
Saviour Machine

- Eric Clayton – vocals
- Jeff Clayton – guitars
- Dean Forsyth – bass
- Nathan Van Hala – keyboards
- Jayson Heart – drums

Additional musicians

- Kristen Van Hala – backing vocals
- Tammy Tiffany – backing vocals
