= WWE Day of Reckoning 2 =

2005 video game

- North American cover art featuring John Cena, Stacy Keibler, and Triple H
- Developer: Yuke's
- Publisher: THQ
- Director: Hirofumi Morino
- Producer: Norifumi Hara
- Designer: Shunsuke Katsumata
- Programmers: Masamichi Takano; Takanori Morita
- Artist: Takashi Komiyama
- Composer: Dave Lowmiller
- Platform: GameCube
- Release: NA: August 29, 2005; EU: September 23, 2005
- Genre: Sports (fighting)
- Modes: Single-player, multiplayer

WWE Day of Reckoning 2 is a 2005 professional wrestling video game developed by Yuke's and released for the GameCube by THQ. It is the sequel to WWE Day of Reckoning. The soundtrack features music by industrial metal group A Dark Halo, who performed two songs in the game; "Burn It All" and "Beyond Recall".

Day of Reckoning 2 has improved graphics over its predecessor, a new strategy-based submission system, and a storyline that allows the player to choose paths.

== Gameplay ==
Day of Reckoning 2 features similar gameplay to the previous Day of Reckoning game with returning features such as Momentum shift and momentum lift. New to the game is the stamina meter, which slows wrestlers' movement over time and when completely depleted, temporarily leaves characters winded and open to attack. In addition, different levels of bleeding on the player's character also affect the character's ability to regain stamina.

The game also introduces four types of submission options. While applying a submission hold, players can choose from one of four submission types: a Taunt submission depletes the opponent's momentum meter, a Rest Hold submission allows the player's character to regain stamina, the Drain submission drains the opponent of stamina, while a regular submission move causes damage to a particular body part.

Players can again create wrestlers and customize each character's set of attacks. Each character can be assigned between one and nine finishing moves, one for each position an opponent is in. The game's Story Mode picks up from the story introduced in the first Day of Reckoning, but created wrestlers cannot be imported from the first game.

== Story ==
The story continues from where the original Day of Reckoning left off (assuming the player chose the Raw storyline and not Smackdown!), with the player's character at the top of the Raw roster. Almost a year after WrestleMania XX, Evolution has disbanded and the player's character has lost the World Heavyweight Championship back to Triple H and has fallen down the ranks of WWE. However, the player's character has gained a love interest in WWE Diva Stacy Keibler.

One month before WrestleMania 21, Triple H loses the title in a controversial match with Chris Jericho and the title is now up for grabs. In an attempt to increase the show's ratings, Raw General Manager Eric Bischoff decides to host a mini-tournament for the World Heavyweight Championship and the finals will be held at WrestleMania 21. The player's character eventually defeats Chris Jericho and advances into the finals. Triple H and the player's character prepare for the finals match before Bischoff reports that the belt was stolen.

The player advances in the story by gathering information on the whereabouts of the World Heavyweight Championship. Soon the player gets framed for stealing the belt, dumped by Stacy, fired and banned from Raw. Soon after, SmackDown! General Manager Theodore Long signs the player to a lifetime SmackDown! contract. Eventually the player wins the WWE Championship and later finds out that former allies Chris Jericho and Randy Orton along with Edge had stolen the World Heavyweight Championship.

With the mystery solved, Triple H asks the player's wrestler for a title match at WrestleMania 22 in a Last Man Standing Match for the WWE Championship. The player's character wins the match, reunites with Stacy and reforges a friendship with Triple H, who turns face and takes possession of the newly found World Heavyweight Championship.

== Reception ==
Reception

Aggregate score
Aggregator	Score
Metacritic	76/100

Review scores
Publication	Score
1Up.com	B+
Electronic Gaming Monthly	5.83/10
Game Informer	7.25/10
GameRevolution	C
GameSpot	8.1/10
GameSpy	3.5/5
GameTrailers	8.1/10
GameZone	8.8/10
IGN	8.5/10
Nintendo Power	8/10
Detroit Free Press	3/4

The game received "generally favorable" reviews according to video game review aggregator Metacritic.

== See also ==
- List of licensed wrestling video games
- List of video games in the WWE Games series
- List of fighting games
