= Mechina (band) =

American metal band

- Origin: Batavia, Illinois, U.S.
- Genres: Symphonic metal, industrial death metal, cyber metal, djent, progressive metal
- Years active: 2004-present
- Spinoffs: A Dark Halo
- Members: Joe Tiberi; Melissa "Mel Rose" Rosenberg; Dave Lowmiller
- Past members: Dan Haas; Scott Oloier; David Holch; Jon Oloier; Randy; Anthony Havemann; David Gavin; Dan Anderson; Steve Amarantos
- Website: Mechina

Mechina is an American independent metal band based in Batavia, Illinois. The band is known for their cinematic symphonic/industrial death metal sound and their albums chronicling an ongoing space sci-fi storyline titled "As Embers Turn to Dust".

== History ==
Formed by guitarist Joe Tiberi and vocalist David Holch on January 1, 2004 with the first of two demos, after releasing their debut album The Assembly of Tyrants in 2005 and a re-recording EP Tyrannical Resurrection in 2007, Mechina began their "As Embers Turn to Dust" saga with their next three albums, each released on January 1; Conqueror (2011), Empyrean (2013), and Xenon (2014). A triple-CD pack for those three albums to celebrate the band's 10th anniversary was released on January 1, 2014, the same day as the release of Xenon. Empyrean was received positively for its "more consistently stellar" songwriting compared to Conqueror which was considered "an oft-overlooked industrial death metal tour de force that was nevertheless just flawed enough to fly under the radar of most genre fans."

The band has also released standalone singles that connect to the storyline, one of which, "To Coexist Is To Surrender", was released on June 3, 2014. It introduces Melissa "Mel Rose" Rosenberg as guest vocalist and serves as the prelude to their next album Acheron. The album was released on January 1, 2015, with cover artwork by Daniel McBride, known for his work for progressive metalcore bands Veil of Maya, Born of Osiris, and After the Burial. Acheron has been given a more mixed reception, as it "further rectifies some of Xenon's problems, yet at the same time delivers new problems." Mel Rose makes her first appearances in a Mechina album, appearing on the upbeat "The Halcyon Purge" and the "strings/piano female vocal-driven ballad", "Ode To The Forgotten Few". The album was followed up by another single, "The World We Lost", released on August 23, 2015, the band's longest song to date at 19 minutes and serving as a prequel to Conqueror, marking the conceptual beginning of the "As Embers Turn to Dust" saga.

The band's next album Progenitor was released on January 1, 2016. The song "Anagenesis" was released in advance on December 26, 2015. Progenitor has been noted to continue the band's streak of "positives and pitfalls", and Mel Rose guest appears again, singing the entirety of tracks "Cryoshock" and "The Horizon Effect". The album was followed by As Embers Turn to Dust, the namesake album of the storyline, released on January 1, 2017. The album was received more positively than their previous three albums, and it is the first album in which Mel Rose was deemed a full-time member.

After releasing their eighth album Telesterion in late 2019 following a nearly three-year gap, its follow-up Siege was released on January 1, 2021, earning both lower-rated and favorable reviews. Although the album's vocal style consists mainly of just clean singing by Mel Rose and David Holch, Conflict vocalist Anna Hel guest appears with harsh vocals on the title track.

The band's next album Venator was released on January 1, 2022. The album has also been given good and bad reviews, the divisive point being the main focus on clean singing, apart from David Holch returning to harsh vocals on "The Embers of Old Earth" and Anna Hel guest appearing again in "When Virtue Meets Steel". The ballad "Totemic" features guest vocals by "Treasur'" Necole Wright. The album was followed by Cenotaph, released on January 1, 2023. The song "The Grand Hunt" was released in advance on December 27, 2022. While once again gaining more positive reviews, Cenotaph was received more poorly than any of the band's previous albums, with criticism towards the aforementioned clean singing being its sole vocal style, along with the metal instrumental track "Broken Matter Manipulation".

The album was followed by another 18-minute single, "Blessings Upon the Field Where Blades Will Flood", once again having David Holch return to his earlier harsh vocals, in his final appearance with the band. Following two more pre-release singles, the band's new album, Bellum Interruptum, was fully released on March 23, 2025, receiving the most positive feedback in years, due to the full-time return of harsh vocals, this time by new vocalist Dave Lowmiller. The album also features returning guests harsh vocalist Anna Hel, clean vocalist "Treasur'" Necole Wright, guitar soloist Dean Paul Arnold, and new guest harsh vocalist Ricky Lewis. On September 28, 2025, two new songs, "Theoxenia" and "The Orbital Blood Famine" were released. A follow-up single, "Nature Is Fair", was released on Bandcamp on May 30, 2026.

== Musical style and influences ==
Mechina and its albums have been described as a variety of genres including symphonic metal, industrial metal, industrial death metal, symphonic death metal, cyber metal, djent, progressive metal, death metal, power metal, heavy metal, and extreme metal.

Despite having a prolific discography, Mechina is primarily a studio project, having never performed live except in their earlier years, nor released any music videos or even been signed to a record label. About the possibility of playing live, Joe Tiberi has stated, "In the past days of playing live, we had to resort to backing tracks for the orchestra and industrial sounds. It really is the only way to present that sound live without an actual orchestra. That would be a dream come true though."

Several of the band's influences include Metallica, Dimmu Borgir, Fear Factory, Devin Townsend, Ludovico Einaudi, Meshuggah, Aborted, and Peter Gabriel. David Holch has stated his fondness of sci-fi films like the original Star Wars trilogy and Aliens.

== Side projects ==
New male vocalist Dave Lowmiller is known as the longtime frontman of A Dark Halo, with female vocalist Mel Rose joining that band in 2021. Other band members include guitarists Christopher M. Jones (Jonesy) and Abe Robertson, and drummer Kaye Papale. The band has released two studio albums; Catalyst (2006) and Omnibus One (2023). The songs "Burn It All" and "Beyond Recall" from Catalyst were featured in the video game WWE Day of Reckoning 2. The song "Thin Be the Veil" from Omnibus One was released as a single ahead of the album.

== Members ==
Current

- Joe Tiberi – guitars, programming, keyboards, synths, piano, orchestrations (2004–present), bass (2013–present), drum programming (2014–present)
- Melissa "Mel Rose" Rosenberg – clean vocals (session member: 2014–2016, full-time member: 2016–present)
- Dave Lowmiller – harsh vocals (2024–present)

Former

- Dan Haas – bass (2004–2005)
- Scott Oloier – drums (2004–2007)
- David Holch – clean/harsh vocals (2004–2024)
- Jon Oloier – bass (2005–2006)
- Randy – bass (2006–2007)
- Anthony Havemann – bass (2007–2010)
- David Gavin – drums (2007–2010, 2011–2014)
- Dan Anderson – drums (2010–2011)
- Steve Amarantos – bass (2010–2013)

== Discography ==
=== Studio albums ===
- The Assembly of Tyrants (November 4, 2005)
- Conqueror (January 1, 2011)
- Empyrean (January 1, 2013)
- Xenon (January 1, 2014)
- Acheron (January 1, 2015)
- Progenitor (January 1, 2016)
- As Embers Turn to Dust (January 1, 2017)
- Telesterion (November 1, 2019)
- Siege (January 1, 2021)
- Venator (January 1, 2022)
- Cenotaph (January 1, 2023)
- Bellum Interruptum (March 23, 2025)

=== Demos/EPs ===
- Embrace the Breed (January 1, 2004)
- Demo (April 19, 2004)
- Tyrannical Resurrection (re-recording EP) (November 4, 2007)

=== Singles ===
- "Andromeda" (May 15, 2011)
- "Zero Signal" (Fear Factory cover) (January 26, 2013)
- "Cepheus" (August 1, 2013)
- "The Moment Between Cause and Effect" ("Tartarus" abridged orchestral demo) (August 25, 2013)
- "Phedra" (November 1, 2013)
- "To Coexist Is to Surrender" (June 2, 2014)
- "Vanquisher" (December 30, 2014)
- "The World We Lost" (August 22, 2015)
- "Anagenesis" (December 26, 2015)
- "Godspeed, Vanguards" (December 5, 2016)
- "Realm Breaker" (June 21, 2019)
- "Siege" (December 4, 2020)
- "Aphelion" (December 20, 2021)
- "The Grand Hunt" (December 20, 2022)
- "Blessings Upon the Field Where Blades Will Flood" (September 9, 2023)
- "The World We Saved" (April 4, 2024)
- "When Honor Meant Something" (October 30, 2024)
- "Theoxenia" / "The Orbital Blood Famine" (September 28, 2025)
- "Nature Is Fair" (May 30, 2026)

=== Boxed set ===
- The Compendium (May 25, 2018)

Contains remastered editions of Conqueror, Empyrean, Xenon, Acheron, Progenitor, and As Embers Turn to Dust, with the singles "The World We Lost", "Andromeda", "Cepheus", and "To Coexist is to Surrender" added to the beginning of the first four albums of the boxset, one single per album.
