= Eric Clayton =

American singer (born 1967)

- Born: December 1, 1967 (age 57)
- Origin: California, U.S.
- Genres: Symphonic gothic metal; Christian metal
- Occupation(s): Singer, songwriter
- Years active: 1989–present
- Member of: Saviour Machine
- Website: ericclaytonandthenine.com

Eric Clayton (born December 1, 1967) is an American singer, best known for his work in the Christian gothic metal group Saviour Machine which he formed with his brother Jeff Clayton in 1989. Eric Clayton is known for his deep baritone operatic vocals, and is known for his theatrical live performances and dark, peculiar appearances and masks.

== Career ==
=== Saviour Machine ===
Eric Clayton's most ambitious work has been Saviour Machine, which released two studio albums Saviour Machine I (1993) and Saviour Machine II (1994) before starting the Legend trilogy that strictly focuses on the end times, Book of Revelation and prophecies about the biblical apocalypse. The band has also released a compilation album titled Synopsis (2003), the live albums Live in Deutschland 1995 and Live in Deutschland 2002. Both were also filmed and released on VHS and DVD format. The band was originally signed to Christian metal label Frontline Records but gothic metal in all its visual appearance was misunderstood in US Christian scenes, and eventually Saviour Machine began work with MCM Music and Massacre Records, labels based in Germany where the band was more popular than in US. In 1997 Saviour Machine performed at Wacken Open Air, the biggest exclusively metal music festival in the world.

Clayton had been working on and off on the last album in the Legend series, Legend Part III:II, which should have been the last Saviour Machine album. The album was supposed to be released on July 7, 2007, but was postponed due to Clayton's esophageal condition called Barrett's Esophagus which was diagnosed in 2004 but eventually got worse. During the downtime of Saviour Machine, Clayton occasionally performed guest vocals and produced albums by other bands.

Clayton compiled The Collective Journals (1997–2009) released in 2010 available at the band website, but soon after performing a handful of unplugged Saviour Machine-shows in The Netherlands and Germany. In 2012, he performed the voice of the "Ratking" in the animated film, Strawinsky and the Mysterious House. The Animator/Producer/Director of the film, David Hutter, revealed on the film's website that he is a fan of Saviour Machine. In 2013, Clayton officially broke up Savior Machine, abandoned the unfinished Legend-project, and retired from the music business.

Following the death of David Bowie in 2016, Eric started a project with his brother Jeff, to record and digitally release a Bowie cover song once a month for a year, in tribute. This collaboration has led to the writing of potential new Saviour Machine material.

=== Post-Saviour Machine ===
Two years after the dissolution of Saviour Machine, in 2015, Clayton committed to playing at Ayreon's Theater Equation shows in Holland in September, reprising his role as "Reason" from the 2004 album The Human Equation. In 2018 he finally returned to music properly, starting a new band called Eric Clayton And The Nine for a European tour. The band consists of Eric and five Dutch musicians, performing the early Saviour Machine repertoire. In 2020 Eric releases his first solo album called 'A Thousand Scars', written together with his brother, Adam Pederson, Ludo Caanen and Twan Bakker. All lyrics written by Eric Clayton and music performed by 'The Nine', produced and mixed by Devon Graves (Psychotic Waltz). The album contains 15 tracks (79 minutes).

== Vocal style and live performance ==
Clayton's vocals can simply be described as operatic. His voice ranges from high tenor to low baritone to occasionally the deep basso, and is typically filled with dark emotions. On Legend trilogy as well as on some guest performances he utilized cinematic, narrative speaking vocals.

On Saviour Machine's concerts, Clayton performs several theatrical and symbolic gestures. He typically paints his face in a way that it resembles an iconic theatre mask, and wears a peculiar forehead jewel as well as black clothes. Some of his live performances include wearing an American flag during the songs "Legion" and "American Babylon", dipping the Israeli and Palestinian flag into blood, wearing devices that resemble demon wings, and other gestures with separate masks, candles, chains, statues etc.

Clayton's lyrics are deeply spiritual, and on the first two album's include themes ranging from salvation to melodramatic, horror oriented dark romanticism on songs such as "Legion". As the first album was banned from Christian bookstores due to a certain line in that song, Clayton has somewhat humorously criticized the Christian music scene for its hypocritical manners on songs such as "Ascension of Heroes."

== Discography ==
Saviour Machine

Year	Title
1990	Saviour Machine (demo)
1993	Saviour Machine I
1994	Saviour Machine II
1995	Live In Deutschland 1995
1997	Legend I
1998	Legend II
2001	Legend III:I
2002	Live In Deutschland 2002
2003	Synopsis: An Introduction to the Artist
2006	Rarities/Revelations

Eric Clayton

Year	Title
2020	A Thousand Scars

Guest appearances

Year	Title	Artist	Contribution
1992	Stay of Execution	Deliverance	Backing vocals
1998	Anthems	Wedding Party	Backing vocals
1998	Damnation (Ride the Madness)	Eva O	
2003	The Great Fall	Narnia	Lead vocals on "The Great Fall of Man"
2004	The Human Equation	Ayreon	The part of "Reason" on several songs
2004	Glory Thy Name	DivineFire	Narration on "From Death to Life", "The Spirit", and "The Way to Eternity"
2005	The Calling	Audiovision	Narration on "Hold Me"
