= Saviour Machine I =

Studio album by Saviour Machine
- Released: 1993; 1996 (reissue)
- Recorded: 1993 The Geen Room and The Mixing Lab
- Genres: Symphonic gothic metal, Christian metal
- Length: 69:44
- Labels: Frontline Records (1993); Massacre Records (1996)
- Producer: Terry Scott Taylor

Saviour Machine chronology
Saviour Machine (1990)	Saviour Machine I (1993)	Saviour Machine II (1994)

Saviour Machine I is the 1993 debut album of the American metal band Saviour Machine. In 2010, Heaven's Metal Magazine ranked it 72nd on the top 100 Christian metal albums of all time list.

== Recording history ==
Saviour Machine I was recorded after the band signed a record deal with the Christian music label Frontline Records at The Green Room and The Mixing Lab. The album was produced by Terry Scott Taylor and co-produced and arranged by Eric Clayton. Saviour Machine I was mixed at The Mixing Lab by Gene Eugene and Bob Moon, and additional engineering was done by Drew Aldridge. The album was mastered by Doug Doyle at Digital Brothers, Costa Mesa, California. On this album the band's line-up consisted of the quartet Eric Clayton (vocals), Jeff Clayton (guitar), Dean Forsyth (bass), and Samuel West (drums). Bob Watson played piano, keyboard and conducted the orchestration, and backing vocals were sung by Jimmy P. Brown II (Deliverance), Love Larrimore, Riki Michelle, and Terry Taylor.

== Reception ==
Professional ratings
Review scores
Source	Rating
Cross Rhythms	9/10 stars
Rock Hard	10/10

According to Eric Clayton, a certain line in the song "Legion" was partially responsible for Saviour Machine I being banned from Christian book stores throughout the United States in the summer of 1993, only weeks after its release. The song's lyrics deal with apocalyptic themes about the rise of the Beast with a gothic horror approach. Because of the controversy surrounding "Legion" in particular, Saviour Machine I is still not distributed in the United States as of today. As a statement to this, since 1993 whenever the band has performed live, Eric Clayton has worn the flag of United States during the performance of "Legion".

Unlike the reception in the United States, Saviour Machine I achieved more notice in the Europe. The British magazine Cross Rhythms rated the album a nine out of ten, opining that it was slightly better than the follow-up release, Saviour Machine II. Rock Hard rated the album a full ten-out-of-ten as they could not find a mediocre song on the album. In 2005, Saviour Machine I was ranked number 329 in Rock Hard magazine's book The 500 Greatest Rock & Metal Albums of All Time. Stefan Lang from Powermetal.de, in a retrospective review, considered the album one of the best from the 1990s. Also in a retrospective review, Tom Kernbichler of Darkscene.at lavished praise on the album, citing the band as the last revolutionary musical revelation in their life.

The album was re-released on Massacre Records in 1996 with different packaging.

== Track listing ==
Lyrics by Eric Clayton. Music by Eric Clayton and Jeff Clayton.

No.	Title	Length
1.	"Carnival of Souls"	6:06
2.	"Force of the Entity"	3:54
3.	"Legion"	4:33
4.	"Ludicrous Smiles"	5:26
5.	"The Wicked Window"	6:30
6.	"Son of the Rain"	5:28
7.	"Killer"	10:07
8.	"The Widow and the Bride"	4:29
9.	"Christians and Lunatics"	5:20
10.	"The Mask"	4:30
11.	"A World Alone"	6:21
12.	"Jesus Christ"	7:00

== Personnel ==
Saviour Machine

- Eric Clayton – vocals
- Jeff Clayton – guitars
- Dean Forsyth – bass
- Samuel West – drums

Additional musicians

- Bob Watson – piano, keyboard and orchestration
- Jimmy P. Brown II – backing vocals
- Love Larrimore – backing vocals
- Riki Michele – backing vocals
- Terry Taylor – backing vocals
