= Saviour Machine =

American Christian metal band

- Origin: Los Angeles, California, U.S.
- Genres: Symphonic gothic metal; Christian metal; progressive metal; art rock
- Years active: 1989–2013, 2019–present
- Labels: Intense Records, MCM Music, Massacre Records
- Members: Eric Clayton; Jeff Clayton; Charles Cooper; Nathan Van Hala
- Past members: Chris Fee; Dean Forsyth; Jayson Heart; Victor Deaton; Carl Johan Grimmark; Thomas Weinesjö; Samuel West

Saviour Machine is an American Christian symphonic gothic metal band that formed in 1989. They have released five studio albums and two live albums on Frontline and subsequently on MCM Music, distributed through Massacre Records. Saviour Machine's music and lyrics deal with war, death, and personal introspection as it relates to prophecy and divine revelation.

== History ==
=== Formation and early years (1989–1993) ===
The band was formed by brothers Jeff and Eric Clayton in mid-1989. By the time of its first tour in 1993, the band was Eric Clayton – vocals, Jeff Clayton – guitars, Dean Forsyth – bass, Jayson Heart – drums, and Nathan Van Hala – keyboards. The band took its name from a song on the David Bowie album The Man Who Sold the World. Saviour Machine recorded and released their first demos in 1990. A theatrical stage show featuring pyrotechnics, images projected onto a background screen and other props attracted a growing fan base in Southern California.

"Legion"
Sample of "Legion" by Saviour Machine, from Saviour Machine I (1993). Containing lyrics with apocalyptic themes, this song eventually led to the album being banned from Christian bookstores in the United States.

In 1993, with the help of Deliverance frontman Jimmy P. Brown II, Saviour Machine signed with and released their first full-length album on Intense Records, an imprint of the Frontline subsidiary of Roadrunner Records. Musically, the band developed a guitar-driven rock music sound, featuring melodic riffs and extensive solos by Jeff Clayton.

Despite critical acclaim from the mainstream press and a growing number of fans nationwide, people in some conservative circles reportedly felt threatened by Saviour Machine's lyrical direction and stage presentation, most prominently the white make-up and jewel worn by vocalist Eric Clayton. During their 1993 tour with metal band Deliverance, the controversy spilled over at a concert at the New Union, a club in Minneapolis. Several songs into their set, the power was cut and the performers were ushered from the stage. This was followed by an announcement from New Union management stating they were uncomfortable with the content of the show. However, many in the crowd gathered with the band shortly after at a local White Castle restaurant to show their continued support.

=== Studio transition (1994–1996) ===
Confusion and political upheaval at Intense/Frontline led to less-than-ideal conditions for the recording of the band's next album in 1994, Saviour Machine II. Musically, the addition of pianist Nathan Van Hala resulted in a classical music-based sound. Many songs featured piano compositions and keyboard orchestration. Charles Cooper also joined the band at this time after Dean Forsyth left.

With the release of Saviour Machine II the band began to pursue new representation. A growing following had developed in Europe, particularly in Germany. This led to the formation of MCM Music, an independent label for all Saviour Machine projects, by vocalist Eric Clayton and his European management team. The band also secured a deal with Massacre Records, a German label that specializes in death metal and other heavy/extreme music. Saviour Machine was given full creative control on all future projects.

Multiple tours of Europe followed in 1995 and 1996. During a 1995 performance at Owen Teck Rocknight, a music festival in Owen, Germany, Saviour Machine recorded their first live album. Live in Deutschland, released in 1995, featured selections from Saviour Machine I and Saviour Machine II. It was after this tour that the membership of Saviour Machine changed with the replacement of Jeff Clayton by Joshua. They performed at Wacken Open Air festival in 1997.

=== The Legend trilogy (1997–2007) ===
Saviour Machine next turned to the Legend trilogy. Legend was advertised as "the unofficial soundtrack to the end of the world" in promotional materials owing to its study of end-time Biblical prophecy. The Legend trilogy comprises four full-length CDs totaling more than five hours of music. Legend I and Legend II were released in 1997 and 1998, respectively. The studio composition of the band stayed the same through Legend II after which Jeff Clayton and Jayson Heart left the band. Legend III:I was released in 2001. The long-awaited final disc, Legend III:II, was scheduled to be released July 7, 2007. Legend parts I through III:I were released by MCM Music and Massacre Records, but Massacre Records released the Legend III:II demos as an album without the band's permission in 2011. On May 27, 2007, Eric Clayton released a statement on the Saviour Machine MySpace blog saying that, due to health problems, he would not be able to finish Legend III:II in time to make the July 7 release date. He released samples of rough mixes of each song on Legend III:II on SeventhCircle.net throughout July.

Most of the lyrical content of the Legend series is based on the Book of Revelation and other Biblical prophecy. The first album draws from the Old Testament and New Testament, except the Book of Revelation, and include biblical references and a concordance. Legend II continues where part one ended - the rise of the antichrist. Musically, the Legend albums showcase a further refinement of Saviour Machine's rock and classical music style.

Saviour Machine has performed a limited number of concerts in the US, Germany and Mexico City since undertaking the Legend trilogy. A second live album was released in 2002, again featuring a performance from Owen Teck Rocknight in Owen, Germany. Live in Deutschland 2002 featured selections from Legend I, Legend II and Legend III:I.

=== Inactive years (2008–2016) ===
Eric Clayton has repeatedly stated that Saviour Machine's work will end upon the completion of the Legend trilogy. In a video message on September 3, 2009, he stated that despite his frail health he is doing quite well and plans to release segments from a journal he has been keeping since 1997. He said that the excerpts will likely serve as his final interview.

Despite these statements, Saviour Machine's homepage went offline in 2013. Saviour Machine's Facebook page, which had received regular updates through 2012, also went inactive during 2013, and subsequently was taken down in 2014. With that, Eric Clayton officially retired Saviour Machine as a band and the whole unfinished Legend project.

=== Reunion and plan for new release (2019–present) ===
According to an interview with Eric Clayton in 2019, they are working on a new album to be released in the future. It will not be part of the Legend trilogy, but follow the first two releases of the band, with the working title Saviour Machine III, alongside Clayton's 2020 solo album A Thousand Scars.

== Members ==
Current members

- Eric Clayton – vocals (1989–present)
- Jeff Clayton – guitar (1989–present)
- Nathan Van Hala – piano (1993–present)
- Charles Cooper – bass (1995–present)
- Samuel West – drums (1992–1993, 2019–present)

Former members

- Chris Fee – drums (1989–1992)
- Dean Forsyth – bass (1989–1995)
- Jayson Heart – drums (1993–1999)
- Victor Deaton – drums (2000–2001)
- Carl Johan Grimmark – guitar (2001–2004)
- Thomas Weinesjö – drums (2001–2004)

Timeline

== Discography ==
=== Studio albums ===
- Saviour Machine (demo) (1990)
- Saviour Machine I (1993)
- Saviour Machine II (1994)
- Legend Trilogy
  - Legend I (1997)
  - Legend II (1998)
  - Legend III:I (2001)
  - Legend III:II (unauthorized demo release) (2011)

=== Live albums ===
- Live in Deutschland 1995 (1995)
- Live in Deutschland 2002 (2002)

=== Compilation ===
- Rarities / Revelations (2006)
