= Symphonic metal =

Music genre that blends heavy metal with classical music

- Other names: Opera metal; operatic metal
- Stylistic origins: Heavy metal; classical; neoclassical metal; power metal; extreme metal; gothic metal
- Cultural origins: Early 1990s

Fusion genres
- Symphonic black metal; symphonic gothic metal

Other topics
- List of symphonic metal bands

Symphonic metal is a subgenre of heavy metal music that makes use of symphonic or orchestra elements. The style can feature different elements of orchestral or classical music, such as symphonic instruments, choirs and sometimes a full orchestra, keyboard orchestration emulating a full orchestra, or compositional influences from classical and orchestral music.

The roots of symphonic metal date to the 1960s and '70s with early metal bands such as Deep Purple recording with a full orchestra and Black Sabbath using an orchestral string section. The genre saw more development in the 1980s and '90s as bands emphasized their symphonic side by adding more ambitious classical features, developing their neoclassical guitar playing in a baroque direction, adding large multi-voice choirs, and writing lengthy songs influenced by orchestral structures. Some symphonic metal bands also started to feature classically trained vocalists, in which case they were attributed nicknames such as opera metal or operatic metal.

Perhaps the most prominent examples of symphonic metal are Swedish band Therion, Finnish band Nightwish, Italian band Rhapsody of Fire, Dutch bands After Forever, Epica, and Within Temptation, Norwegian band Dimmu Borgir, and American band Trans-Siberian Orchestra. These bands also have strong influences from film scores in addition to the more basic classical components utilized more widely in the genre. Some of the main composers in this style of metal music are classically trained.

== Musical characteristics ==
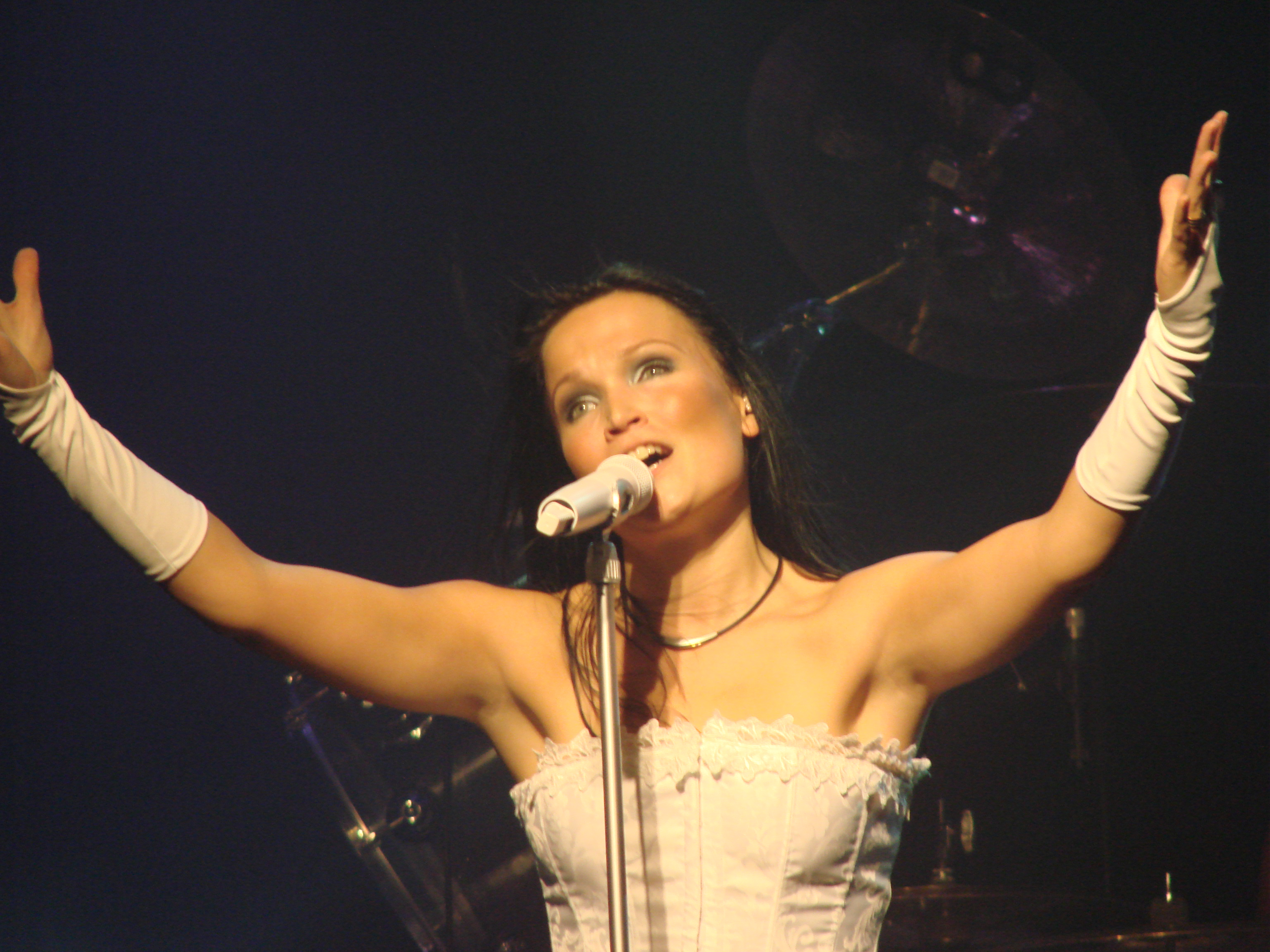
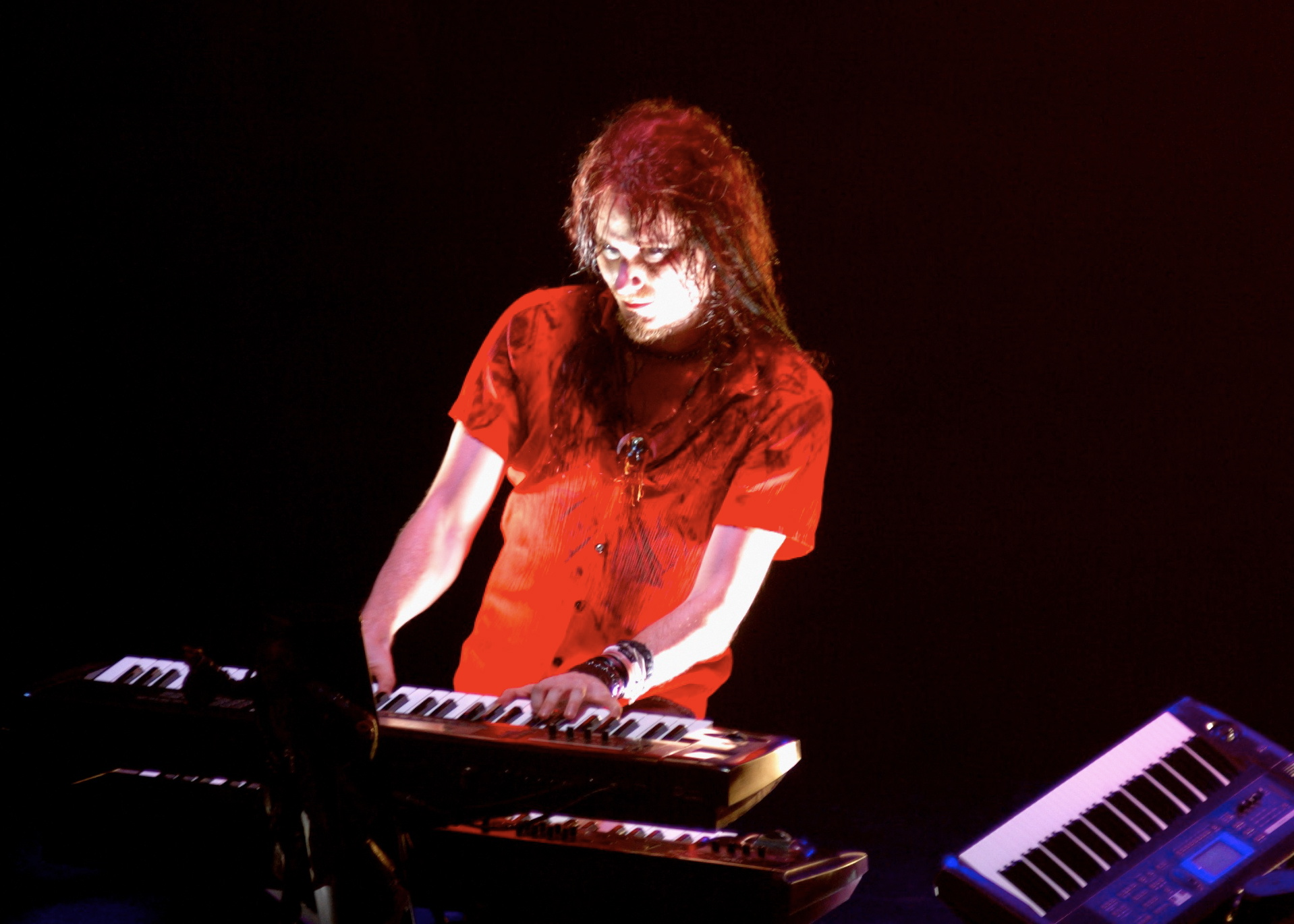
Nightwish is one of the prime acts adopting the symphonic metal style. The use of keyboards through traditional piano and strings and the soprano vocals of Tarja Turunen, until her departure from the band in 2005, were distinct parts of their original sound.

The metal subgenres most typically featuring a subset of symphonic bands are gothic metal, power metal, black metal, death metal and classic heavy metal. As with many other metal bands, those adopting a symphonic style may feature influences from several metal subgenres.

"Heavy Is The Crown (instrumental)"
A piece of symphonic metal music which uses both live instrument performances and music workstation orchestration, performed by L-Train & the Royal Canterlot Symphonic Metal Orchestra.

The Time Has Come, by Capricia
A symphonic/progressive metal song by the band Capricia, who have since turned to video game development. This song is part of the album Of Bird and Cage, which is a concept album written to accompany the video game of the same name that the band deems an interactive album.

Music workstation keyboards and orchestras are often a key feature of the style, distinguishing symphonic from non-symphonic bands within the same metal subgenre. Other instruments, including guitars, bass and drums, may in some cases play relatively simple parts in contrast to the complex and nuanced keyboard and/or orchestral parts, typically in the case of symphonic heavy metal and symphonic gothic metal acts. The use of such instruments (as well as the lead vocals) to play simpler, catchier melodies than those of the average non-symphonic band arguably makes the symphonic style one of the most accessible in metal. Bands that do not use live orchestral instrumentation on their recordings or when playing live typically utilize factory presets on workstation keyboards (i. e., strings, choirs, pianos, pipe organs, etc.) to conjure up a "pseudo-orchestral" sound, where parts are played idiomatically according to keyboard technique. This is particularly characteristic of lesser-known bands on tighter budgets. Some symphonic metal bands abstain from using keyboards entirely, preferring to use orchestral backing tracks pre-recorded by a live symphony orchestra and/or choir during an album session, or recorded using virtual software instruments in a sequencer. This is particularly characteristic of bands that feature deeper and more complex arrangements which could be more difficult for one or two keyboardists to reproduce faithfully in a live performance.

On average, songs under the symphonic metal umbrella are often highly atmospheric, though more upbeat than those of many non-symphonic metal bands; songs with morbid themes routinely feature prominent major-key fanfares. Particularly central to creating mood and atmosphere is the choice of keyboard timbre. It is nonetheless hard to generalize about the role played by the classic metal instruments (guitars, bass and drums) within symphonic bands, as it can entirely vary depending on the metal subgenre to which the symphonic band mostly belongs.

Lyrics cover a broad range of topics. As with two of its often overlapping elements, power metal and opera (including symphonic progressive rock), fantasy and mythological themes are common. Concept albums styled after operas or epic poems are not uncommon.

Epica at Wacken Open Air 2018
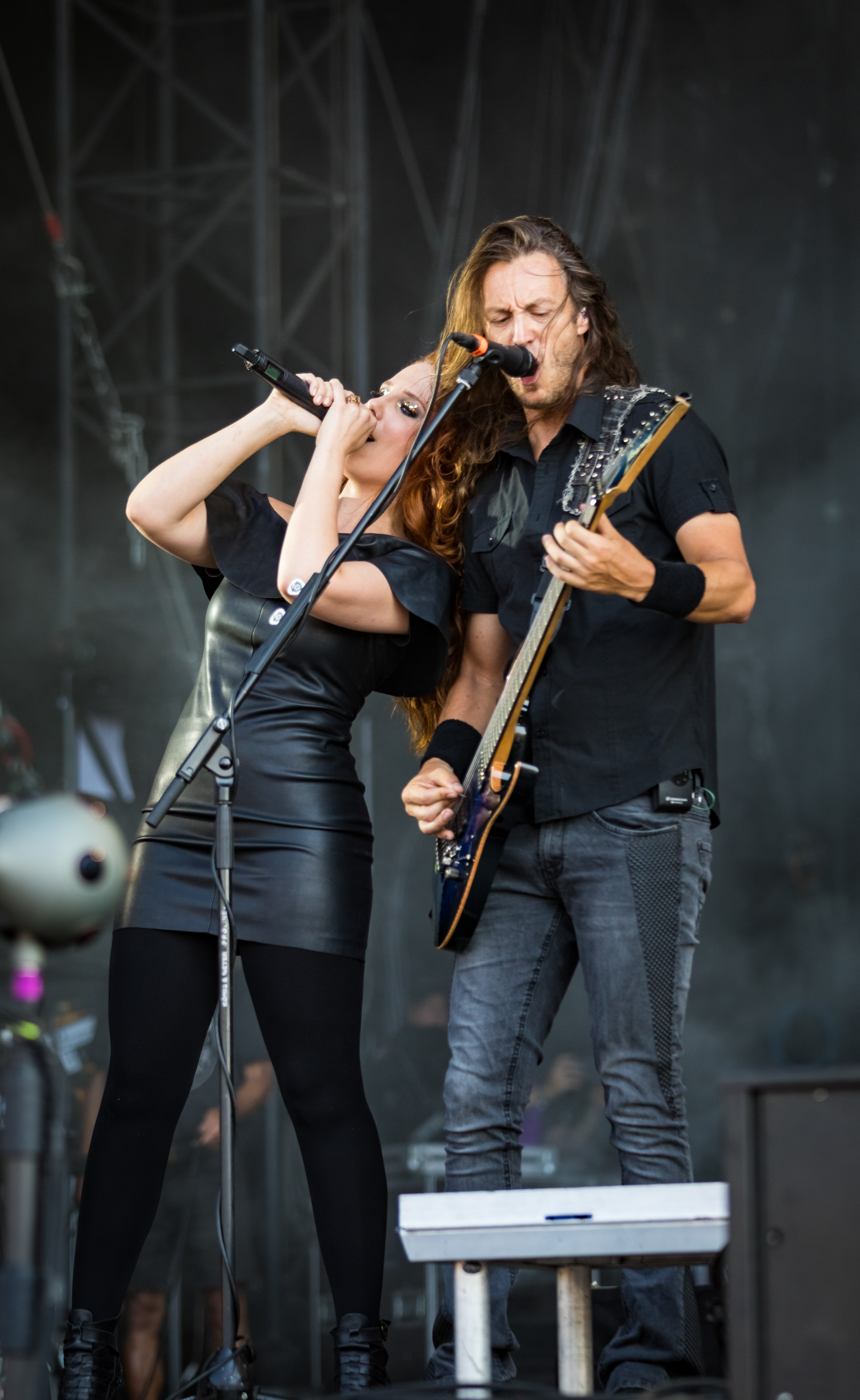

Abyss of Time - Countdown to Singularity, by Epica
The contrast between Simone Simons' operatic vocals and Mark Jansen's death grunts is a feature of Epica's music, as demonstrated in this sample of the song "Abyss of Time - Countdown to Singularity" from their album Ωmega (2021).

Bands in this genre may often feature a female lead vocalist, usually a soprano. Male vocalists (baritone or bass-baritone), are also common in gothic metal. Growling, death-metal-style vocals are not unknown but tend to be used less frequently than in other metal subgenres (a notable exception being Mark Jansen in Epica). Backing vocals, often consisting of a choral ensemble or full choir, may be employed.

It is common for bands, particularly female-fronted bands, to feature operatic lead vocals. Such bands may be referred to as operatic symphonic metal and include the likes of Epica, Nightwish (Tarja Turunen, then Floor Jansen), Haggard, Therion, Operatika, Dremora, Dol Ammad, Visions of Atlantis, Aesma Daeva, and Almora, among countless others. The operatic style is not tied exclusively to symphonic metal, but may appear in avant-garde metal, progressive metal and gothic metal. Many bands featuring operatic female vocalists also have a male vocalist who uses harsh vocals for contrast, in a vocal style often referred to as "beauty and the beast".

== Origins and evolution ==
From the 1960s and '70s, a number of early or influential bands on the development of heavy metal music used occasional orchestral elements in some of their songs.

In 1969, the English group Deep Purple, recognized as early pioneers of metal music, released their album Concerto for Group and Orchestra. The title composition was a 50-minute piece combining blues rock with backing from The Royal Philharmonic Orchestra conducted by Malcolm Arnold. The music was all written by the band's keyboardist Jon Lord who had studied classical and baroque piano from childhood. The group's then-guitarist Richie Blackmore said in a 1979 interview with Sounds magazine how he enjoyed classical music as a listener but was not enthusiastic about the orchestral project as he felt "[t]he orchestra was very condescending towards us, and I didn't like playing with them, so it was one big calamity onstage."

One of the earliest songs by a heavy metal band to include string arrangements is "Spiral Architect", the closing track of the fifth Black Sabbath album, Sabbath Bloody Sabbath, released in 1973.

Led Zeppelin, also recognized as a foundational influence on metal, hired musicians performing orchestral strings and brass for their 1974 song "Kashmir" from their untitled fourth album, and also used a Mellotron keyboard to add further instrumental layers emulating an orchestra.

Progressive rock groups of the 1960s and '70s often incorporated quasi-orchestral elements, and some of the more aggressive such groups had songs that both verged on metal and were also influenced by classical works. Notable is King Crimson, with their 1973 album Larks' Tongues in Aspic, whose leader Robert Fripp was in this era strongly inspired by composers Bela Bartok and Igor Stravinsky and also by the forceful blues rock of Jimi Hendrix.

In the 1980s, Celtic Frost experimented with orchestration, woodwinds, horns, and choral voices in the albums To Mega Therion and Into the Pandemonium. 2021 article by Metal Hammer listed the latter at number two in its list of the best twenty-five symphonic metal albums. The article claims that while perhaps neither Celtic Frost album constitutes "full-blown" symphonic metal, the rest the symphonic metal recordings listed in the article likely would not exist if not for Into the Pandemonium.

An early prototypical symphonic metal song was "Dies Irae" by American Christian thrash metal group Believer. Appearing on their 1990 album Sanity Obscure, it foreshadowed the operatic approach used by the bands Therion (named after the Celtic Frost album To Mega Therion) and Nightwish. According to Jeff Wagner in his book Mean Deviation, the song was a creative watershed in metal, and except for Mekong Delta, no other extreme metal band at the time had merged the genre with classical music so seamlessly. The band continued with operatic and symphonic elements on their next release, Dimensions (1993), on the multi-song suite "The Trilogy of Knowledge". The gothic metal band Saviour Machine, which formed in 1989 and released its first studio album in 1993, has also been referred to as symphonic metal.

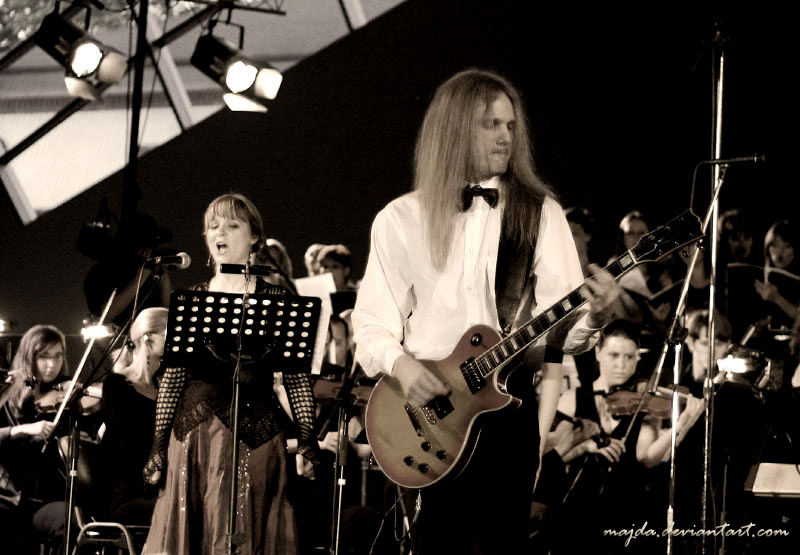
Therion's Lori Lewis and Christofer Johnsson with symphonic orchestra and choir during the live classical show at the Miskolc Opera Festival, Hungary, 2007.

More bands began combining symphonic and extreme metal elements in the early 1990s. Dutch band The Gathering released their demo An Imaginary Symphony in 1990 combining the low-pitched growling vocals of death metal with prominent synthesizer, leading to their first album Always... in 1992 which was one of the first albums combining death growls, synthesizer leads and female soprano singing. Finnish band Amorphis released The Karelian Isthmus combining death metal with melodic synthesizer leads. Dutch band Orphanage released their demo Morph in 1993 also combining synthesizer leads, death growls and also female soprano singing. In 1995, the Norwegian band Theatre of Tragedy released their self-titled debut album Theatre of Tragedy with death growls, synthesizer leads, and female singing. This blend would be used more prominently in 1996 with their second album Velvet Darkness They Fear. The Swedish band Therion were influential through their use of a live orchestra and classical compositional techniques; gradually these elements became a more important part of Therion's music than their death metal roots, culminating on the 1996 album Theli. Another key early influence was Finnish progressive metal band Waltari's album Yeah! Yeah! Die! Die! Death Metal Symphony in Deep C. In mid-1996 Rage released Lingua Mortis, the band's first collaboration with the Prague Symphony Orchestra. 1997 saw the emergence of four bands that helped developed the symphonic metal sound even further; Haggard, Nightwish, Rhapsody of Fire, and Within Temptation, with their debut albums released that year.

Many more bands of the genre followed in the early to mid-2000s like After Forever, Epica, Delain, Leaves' Eyes, Xandria, and Edenbridge. The genre slowly started to form around powerful female lead vocals and the heavy use of classically influenced keyboard playing. Some combined these elements with power metal, with its relatively upbeat fantasy themes and stylized keyboard sounds, while others combined these elements with death metal with heavy riffs and intense double bass sections on drums. Notable bands in the latter category include Eternal Tears of Sorrow and Mors Principium Est. Mechina and Shade Empire have taken that sound further by blending it with industrial metal, as did Winds of Plague and Lorna Shore with deathcore. Swedish metalcore band Imminence has added violin and other orchestral elements to make a symphonic metalcore sound.

== Notable subgenres ==
=== Symphonic black metal ===
Symphonic black metal has similar components as melodic black metal, but uses keyboarding or instruments normally found in symphonic or classical music. It can also include black metal bands that make heavy usage of atmospheric keyboarding in the music, akin to symphonic metal or gothic metal. The symphonic aspects of this genre are normally integral parts of a band, and as such are commonly used throughout the whole duration of a song. The prototypical symphonic black metal bands are Dimmu Borgir, Bal-Sagoth, Cradle of Filth, Emperor and Carach Angren.

=== Symphonic gothic metal ===
Symphonic gothic metal is a subgenre of gothic metal that emerged in the 1990s and incorporates symphonic and orchestral elements, as well as heavy usage of atmospheric keyboarding in the music, akin to symphonic black metal. The symphonic aspects of this genre are normally integral parts of a band, and as such are commonly used throughout the whole duration of a song. Several of the most notable symphonic gothic metal bands are Saviour Machine, Theatre of Tragedy, Leaves' Eyes, Xandria, and Trail of Tears.

== See also ==
- List of symphonic metal bands
