= Jarno Elg =

Finnish Satanist and murderer (born 1975)

Jarno Sebastian Elg (born 1975) is a Finnish Satanist and murderer. He was sentenced to life in prison for murdering a 23-year-old man in Hyvinkää, Finland on 21 November 1998, eating some of the body parts and instigating others to participate in a Satanistic ritual that included torturing the victim. The case has been described as the most gruesome homicide in Finnish history.

== Murder ==
On November 20 of 1998, the 23-year-old Jarno Elg was accompanied by his 17-year-old girlfriend Terhi Johanna Tervashonka from Järvenpää, 20-year-old Mika Kristian Riska from Mäntsälä, a 16-year-old boy from Kerava, as well as the 23-year-old victim. They spent Friday evening drinking alcohol in Järvenpää as part of a larger group. They visited the local congregation and debated about Satanism and Christianity before the five left for Elg's apartment in Hyvinkää.

At the apartment, Elg punched the victim in the face, causing him to lose consciousness. He was tied using duct tape, and his entire head was taped over. Elg and Tervashonka then proceeded to hit him with scissors around different parts of the body. As the victim was being tortured, the group reportedly listened to The Cainian Chronicle, an album by the Norwegian black metal band Ancient. The victim eventually died of suffocation due to his face being covered with duct tape. After this, cannibalistic and necrophilic acts were performed on the body by Elg and Tervashonka, as well as genital mutilation and tearing out the victim's intestines. The victim's head was "severed and disgraced", before the rest of the body was dismembered and dumped into separate waste containers.

=== Criminal investigation ===
The criminal investigation began when a leg was found on a landfill on November 24. After a week of searching the area, a part of the victim's torso was found. An examination of the torso allowed the authorities to determine the victim's approximate age and lifestyle, including frequent use of alcohol. This lead the police to believe that the victim was a recipient of social welfare benefits, which in turn lead to the discovery of the victim's name. The victim's identity was positively confirmed through DNA testing. The rest of the group who had spent the evening at Elg's apartment were suspected of the murder and apprehended on December 8, 1998.

== Trial and aftermath ==
Jarno Elg was sentenced to life in prison. The accomplices Terhi Johanna Tervashonka and Mika Kristian Riska were sentenced to eight years and six months and two years and eight months in prison respectively by the Hyvinkää District Court of Southern Finland. The 16-year-old boy's charges were dropped completely, as the court found that he had been forced by Elg to participate in the events. It was said that the three people sentenced "were strongly influenced by Satanism". The court declared most of the details of the case to be sealed for 40 years. For this reason, only a limited amount of information is available.

After the sentences, the media was accused by black metal musicians of trying to "raise up black metal as a scapegoat for the events in Hyvinkää". Demonos Sova of Barathrum "tried his very best not to involve Black Metal and Satanism with the murder" and called the murderers "some nutcases", whereas the I Return to Darkness fanzine "fully supports the murder of Hyvinkää and would like to hail in honour all those who participated in it". An article printed by the Norwegian Slayer fanzine stated that "[i]t's amazing how Satanists are always so full of strength and never forget to remind us that the weak must be weeded out., yet when someone does actually weed out some weak hypocrite - they are the first to mourn in public to save their precious Satanism from the terrible Devil Worshippers who ruin the whole name and essence of Satan which actions that, of course, don't have anything to do with 'real' Satanism", and told Sova to "[f]uck off and die". The article also questions why some people within the scene were "so fucking protective concerning black metal's 'good reputation'" although "black metal was the only form of 'music' where the music itself doesn't come as the first priority", whereas musicians now would seem to "care more about their guitars than the actual essence onto which the whole concept was and is based upon". In Metalion: The Slayer Mag Diaries, the fanzine's author Metalion stated that it was a "stupid article" and people gave him "lots of shit for printing the article, especially because the point of view tended to support the attackers".

In an interview given in 2000, Tervashonka explained that she did not consider the case murder. She said that she and her friends, completely intoxicated, had tied and silenced another member of the group who had become noisy by using a duct tape without realizing that he would suffocate as a result. Tervashonka denied that the case had been related to devil worship.

== Release ==
Tervashonka was paroled in the spring of 2003. In 2007 she was sentenced to another ten years in prison for killing a 47-year-old man by using a billhook. In 2018 Ilta-Sanomat reported that she had no longer had criminal convictions in the recent years.

Elg was released on parole in February 2016, after serving 17 years in prison.
