= Saddolls =

Greek gothic metal band

SadDoLLs

Background information
- Origin: Athens, Greece
- Genres: Gothic metal
- Years active: 2006–present
- Labels: Emotion Art, Lunatic Asylum, Inverse
- Members: George Downloved; Paul Evilrose; J.Vitu; Sir Psycho; Darroc (Fivos Andriopoulos)
- Past members: Miltos Demonized; Darroc (Fivos Andriopoulos); M-Teo; Mike Dorado; Suicide; Philippos S.; BloodyMary
- Website: saddolls.net

Saddolls (stylised SadDoLLs) is a Greek gothic metal band formed in 2006 as a cover band. After a few live performances, the band recorded the EP Dead in the Dollhouse in 2007, gaining positive reviews from the press. In April 2008, the band was the support act for Lacrimas Profundere's gig in Athens.

The band has released three full-length albums. The first, About Darkness, was released in Europe by the Greek Label Emotion Art music, the second one, Happy Deathday, was released in January 2012 by the Italian label Lunatic Asylum Records and Twilight worldwide, and the latest, Grave Party, was released worldwide via Inverse Records in April 2014. As of May 2016, the band is under a contract with the German-based label Trisol Music Group.

== History ==
=== About Darkness (2009) ===
In June 2008 Saddolls entered the Fragile Studios to record their first full-length album "About Darkness" The self-financed album was mixed and produced by Vangelis Yalamas and mastered by John Petrolias. At the beginning of 2009 the band signed a record deal with the Greek label Emotion Art Music. On the official album release party the first music video for the song "Watch Me Crawl Behind" was aired exclusive. Soon the band started touring around Greece along with TV appearances such as Mad Day Live, Radio Arvyla and TV War. In October 2009 Saddolls opened for Paradise Lost at Gagarin 205 live stage. After the release of their second music video "Misery" directed by Vangelis Yalamas (Fragile Vastness), the band opened for Xandria's show in Athens on 8 May 2010.

=== Happy Deathday (2012) ===
After the end of the contract with Emotion Art, the band entered the Soundflakes Studios with producer John Mcris (Anorimoi) to record their second full-length album Happy Deathday. The album contains special featurings with artists from bands such as Jape Perätalo (To/Die/For) Jussi-Mikko Salminen (HIM) Roberth Karlsson (Scar Symmetry) and Morgan Laxroix and Terry Horn from Mandragora Scream. The band then under a contract with the Italian Record label Lunatic Asylum Records (Mandragora Scream) released the album worldwide on 20 January 2012. The band's management in Germany was handled by Silke Ily Sirnio HIM and the first single-video Bloodred. was included in the February issue of Sonic Seducer compilation cd Cold Hands Seduction Vol.128 The band then opened once again for Lacrimas Profundere on their show in Athens on 7 April 2012; in September the band was the support act for Moonspell's gigs in Athens and Thessaloniki. SadDoLLs then shot the video for the next single called Psychedelic Love that featured Robeth Karlsson from the Swedish band (Scar Symmetry). The band played in an anniversary party, for the Greek HIM fan club, Darksecret Club. The setlist consisted only by HIM covers and the show featured Jussi-Mikko Salminen former HIM keyboarder. The event took place on 24 November 2012

=== Grave Party – Blood of a Kind (2014–2017) ===
In February 2013 SadDoLLs released the last single and video from the "Happy Deathday" album called Criminal Of Love. After that the band started the pre-production of the new album, later to be titled "Grave Party". After the recordings were finished the band ended their collaboration with the Italian Lunatic Asylum and signed a deal with the Finnish Inverse Records On December the 25th the band performed at the Dark Storm Festival 2013 in Chemnitz, Germany along with VNV Nation, Blutengel, Gothminister, Mono Inc., Solar Fake, Agonoize among others. The band then signed a contract with the German Promotion and Management company Absolut Promotion and the new album and new single called "Lady Cry" was well received from the German Media The new album was released worldwide on May the 2nd through an official release live show and it features Skinny Disco from the Swedish band Deathstars performing on the song called "Terminate Me" The band then was booked to open for the Finnish goth rockers The 69 Eyes in Tallinn, Estonia at the Rock Cafe club on 12 April 2014 with a special featuring of Esa Viren from the Finnish goth metal band To/Die/For as their bass player. The band opened for the Gothic Rock band Star Industry in Athens, and their first single "Lady Cry" was included once again in the Sonic Seducer's compilation CD "Cold Hands Seduction Vol.154". In October, the band released a music video for their single "Terminate me" that features Skinny Disco from Deathstars.

The band is now working on a new album called Blood of a Kind. It will feature some special guests such as Juha-Pekka Leppäluoto (from Charon (Band), Northern Kings, Harmaja, and Dark Sarah, as well as the first Poisonblack album), and Mikki Chixx from Swiss band Stoneman. The album will be released physically and digitally (along with all the band's previous releases) by the German label Trisol Music Group.

== Members ==
=== Current members ===
- George Downloved – vocals (2006–present)
- Paul Evilrose – guitars (2006–present)
- J.Vitu – guitars (2013–present)
- Sir Psycho – bass (2017–present)
- Darroc – drums (2008–2010, 2016–present)

=== Studio members ===
- Sean McQueen – keyboards (2018)

=== Former members ===
- Mary Mc Blood – bass (2010–2012)
- Miltos Demonized – bass (2006–2010)
- Mike Dorado – drums (2010–2011)
- M-Teo (Teo Buzz) – keyboards (2009–2010)
- Suicide – keyboards (2009)
- Oberon – keyboards (2008)
- BloodyMary – keyboards (2007)
- Eri – keyboards (2006)
- Philippos S. - drums (2007)
- Babylon – drums (2006–2007)
- Daniel Aven – guitars (2007–2013)
- Liam Fox – drums (2013)
- Dennis M. – drums (2014)
- St. Gus – drums (2010–2014)
- Ak66 – drums (2016)
- GB – bass (2012–2017)

== Discography ==
=== Studio albums ===
- About Darkness (2009)
- Happy Deathday (2012)
- Grave Party (2014)
- Blood of a Kind (2017)

=== EPs ===
- Dead In The Dollhouse EP (2007)
- Cold Blood Inside (2017)
- Lady Cry (Feat.MGT) (2017)
- Creep It Into You (2018)
- Call Me Pain (2020)

=== Compilations ===
- Cold Hands Seduction Vol.128 (2012)
- Reborn – A Greek Tribute To Moonspell (2012)
- Cold Hands Seduction Vol.154 (2014)
- Gothic Spirits 19 (2015)

== Videography ==
- Watch Me Crawl Behind (2009, Album About Darkness)
- Misery (2010, Album About Darkness)
- Bloodred (2011, Album Happy Deathday)
- Psychedelic Love (2012, Album Happy Deathday)
- Criminal Of Love (2013, Album Happy Deathday)
- Lady Cry (2014, Album Grave Party)
- Terminate Me (2014, Album Grave Party)
- Angels Making Love (2014, Album Grave Party)
- Thirteen (2015, Album Grave Party)
- Jigsaw (2016, Non-Album Track Tribute To SAW)
- Cold Blood Inside (2017, Album Blood Of A Kind)
- Creep It Into You (2018, Album Blood Of A Kind)
- Call Me Pain (2020, Single Call Me Pain)
- Call Me Pain (Midnight Stripped) (2023, Single Call Me Pain)
