= Proxima Centauri (disambiguation) =

Proxima Centauri is a small star located 4.2465 light-years away from the Sun in the southern constellation of Centaurus.

Proxima Centauri may also refer to:

- Proxima Centauri (album), a 2001 album by Ancient, or the title song
- "Proxima Centauri", a song by At the Drive-In from Vaya (EP)
- "Proxima Centauri" (short story), a 1936 science-fiction story by Murray Leinster

== See also ==
- Proxima (disambiguation)
- Centauri (disambiguation)
