= Fallen Stars and Rising Scars =

Studio album by Wastefall
- Released: 28 July 2003
- Genre: Progressive metal
- Length: 51:26
- Label: Sleaszy Rider Records

Wastefall chronology
Fallen Stars and Rising Scars (2003)	SoulRain 21 (2004)

Fallen Stars and Rising Scars is the first album by progressive metal band Wastefall.

== Track listing ==
1. Killing of Wolves (04:52)
2. Like Father Like None (06:06)
3. For What is to be Lost (01:33)
4. Fall of Eva (05:33)
5. Annabel Lee (06:55)
6. Confession (02:15)
7. Subroutine (04:32)
8. April's Ruin (05:42)
9. That was all About (07:14)
10. One with the Fall (06:44)
