= SoulRain 21 =

Studio album by Wastefall
- Released: November 7, 2004
- Genre: Progressive metal
- Length: 71:11
- Label: Sleaszy Rider Records

Wastefall chronology
| Fallen Stars and Rising Scars (2003) | SoulRain 21 (2004) | Self Exile (2006) |

SoulRain 21 is the second album by progressive metal band Wastefall.

== Track listing ==
Disc I

1. Soulrain (02:55)
2. Stunned To The World (05:06)
3. Empty Haven (07:19)
4. Lullaby For The Gods (06:40)
5. Lesser (06:46)
6. Live With It (05:28)
7. Summerlonging Angels (04:55)
8. Self-Extinction Project (05:13)
9. Riot Of Oblivion (10:34)
10. 21 (05:03)

Disc II

1. Fountains Of Fire (05:56) - (bonus)
2. Numb Lake (05:16) - (bonus)
3. Stunned To The World (05:06) - (video)

Total Time: 71:11

== Line up ==
- Domenik Papaemmanouil / lead vocals, guitars
- Alex Katsiyannis / guitars, vocals
- Christos Kyrkilis / keyboards
- Matthew Dakoutros / violin
- Nick Valentzis / bass guitar
- Kostis Papaleksopoulos / drums
