= Happy Deathday =

Studio album by Saddolls
- Released: January 21, 2012 (Europe)
- Genre: Industrial metal, gothic metal
- Length: 52:00
- Label: Lunatic Asylum, Twilight

Saddolls chronology
About Darkness (2009)	Happy Deathday (2012)	Grave Party (2014)

Professional ratings
Review scores
Source	Rating
GryphonMetal	9/10 link

Happy Deathday is the second album by Greek metal band Saddolls. It was the band's first major opening in the European countries when the first single Bloodred was included at Sonic Seducer's compilation album Cold Hands Seduction Vol.128. The album also features some guest musicians from bands such as HIM, To/Die/For, Scar Symmetry, Mandragora Scream and Seduce The Heaven.

== Track listing ==
No.	Title	Length
1.	"Happy Deathday, Dear"	1:55
2.	"Killing Sorrow"	4:06
3.	"Be Darkness feat.Elina Laivera"	3:40
4.	"Criminal Of Love"	4:07
5.	"The Drug feat.Jape Peratalo"	3:38
6.	"Psychedelic Love feat.Roberth Karlsson"	4:48
7.	"Dying On The Dancefloor feat.Jussi-Mikko Salminen"	3:29
8.	"Amanda Blood"	3:53
9.	"Embrace The Dark"	6:09
10.	"Coma Song"	4:41
11.	"Watch Me Crawl Behind feat.Morgan Lacroix"	4:00
12.	"Bloodred (Vampire Mix) feat.Terry Horn"	3:48
Total length:		52:00

== Band personnel ==
- George Downloved – vocals
- Paul Evilrose – guitar
- Daniel Aven – guitar
- Mary McBlood - bass
- St. Gus - drums

Guest musicians:

- Elina Laivera - female vocals
- Jape Peratalo - guest vocals
- Roberth Karlsson - screams and growls
- Sakis Darkface - screams and growls
- Manos Fatsis - backing vocals
- John Soti - backing vocals
- Duffy - backing vocals
- Alex Flouros - additional guitars
- John McRis - additional guitars and keyboards
- M-Teo (Teo Buzz) - keyboards

== Production personnel ==
- John McRis – Mastering
- Mironized – Design
- John McRis – Engineer
- Nick Papadopoulos – Mixing

== Videos ==
- Bloodred on YouTube
- Psychedelic Love on YouTube
- Criminal Of Love on YouTube
