= G. proximus =

G. proximus may refer to:

- Gelanor proximus, a spider species in the genus Gelanor
- Geophagus proximus, a fish species in the genus Geophagus

== See also ==
- Proximus (disambiguation)
