= Hortus Animae =

Italian progressive black metal band

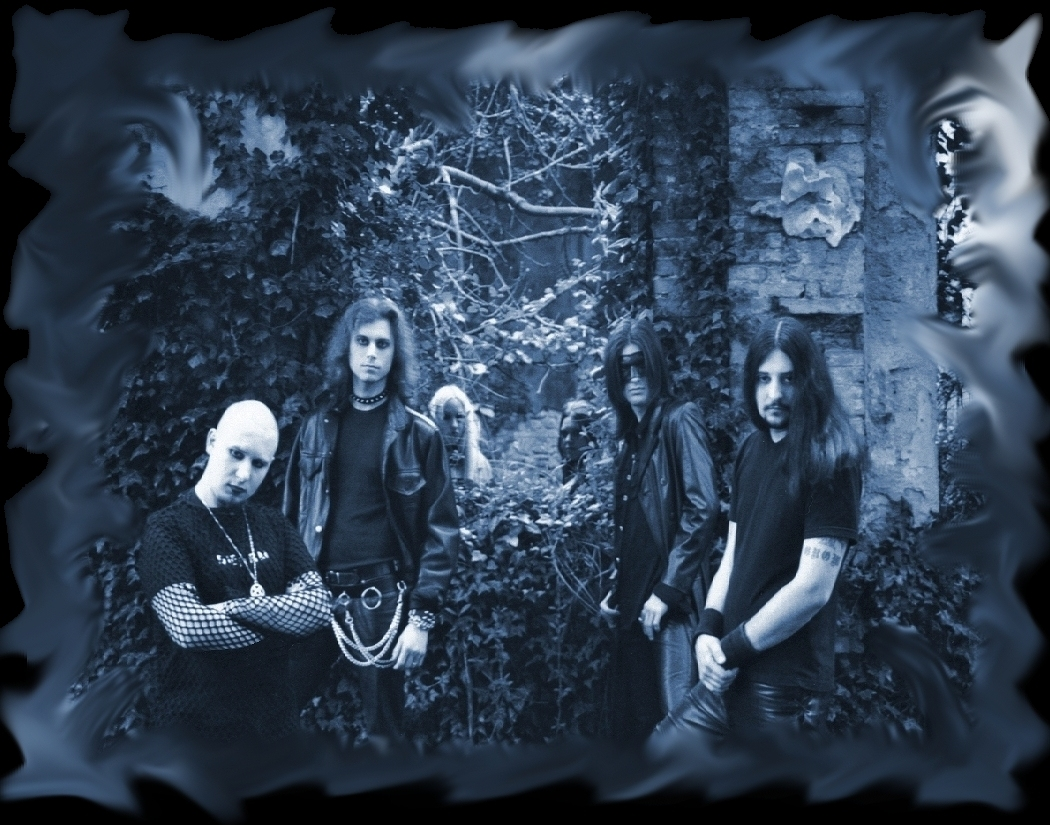
- Lineup 2004

Background information
- Origin: Rimini
- Genres: Progressive metal, black metal
- Years active: 1997–2006, 2013-present
- Labels: Black Lotus Records, Sleaszy Rider Records (EMI), Thrash Corner Records (USA)
- Members: Martyr Lucifer; Hypnos; Bless; Grom
- Website: Official Website

Hortus Animae is a progressive black metal band from Northern and Central Italy. They formed in 1997 in Rimini. Following the release of their self-produced debut "The Melting Idols", they began playing live with bands like Lacuna Coil, Ancient, and Napalm Death. After opening for Norwegian black metal band Ancient in Padova, the band befriended drummer Grom, who joined the band and made it his primary side-project. At that point, the band recorded their second album and first official release, "Waltzing Mephisto". The album was recorded at Italian metal studio "Fear". Following the recording, the band signed with Black Lotus Records in October 2002, and subsequently with Sleaszy Rider Records (EMI) for their third album, The Blow Of Furious Winds, in May 2005.

After their 1998 demo cassette An Abode For Spirit And Flesh, they developed a following in the underground and gained attention from the specialized press, which gave the band positive reviews.

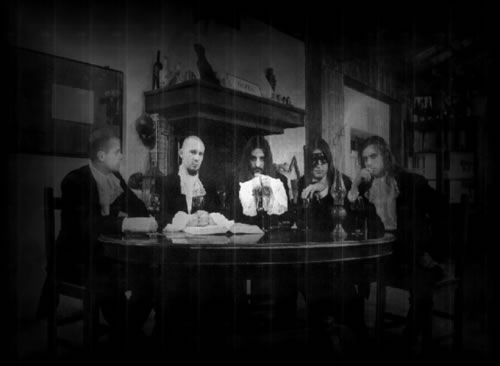
Lineup 2005

The band has achieved cult status in the extreme metal underground, due to their secretive live appearances and eclectic blend of styles and cover songs. They drew from 1970s progressive rock, gothic, classical and ambient sound, blended with death/black metal. They incorporated piano, viola, violin, mandolin, synth, and diverse vocal styles into their music, something new to the scene at that time. Drummer Grom's following due to his other projects (Doomsword, Ancient) may be another reason for the band's success.

The official debut album Waltzing Mephisto contains a cover of "Freezing Moon" by Mayhem that blends Mike Oldfield's "Tubular Bells" with Italian 1970s prog band Il Balletto di Bronzo's "Terzo Incontro", highlighting the band's dark progressive rock influences. Their following album, The Blow Of Furious Winds, contained another 1970s prog rock pastiche of Queen's "The Fairy Feller's Master-Stroke" and "Nevermore".

In between albums, the band covered another song on The Lotus Eaters: Tribute to Dead Can Dance. Hortus Animae recorded their interpretation of "Windfall" & "Summoning Of The Muse" with gothic singer Liv Kristine.

Italian magazine Metal Maniac proclaimed Hortus Animae 'best emerging band' and 'best Italian album of the year' in 2005.

The group disbanded on 18 January 2006. They posted this message on their website:

"Due to different motivations, the band decided to split-up or, at least, to stay on hold for some time. There are technical and personal reasons involved (the music business, hardships... life itself) which led us to take this decision. We faced many difficulties in the music industry, but we wish to thank and hail all the fans and people who bought our albums, visited our websites, came to our shows, wrote to us, believed in what we did or just listened to our music. We also want to thank the worldwide metal press for their support. We may return in the future, but for now we just don't know."

Years after their split, they released the 10th-anniversary commemorative box set Funeral Nation: 10 years of Hortus Animae through Sleaszy Rider Records (EMI distribution). The boxset contained a T-shirt, a mug, and a pin, as well as their first two official albums, Waltzing Mephisto in an unreleased demo version, and The Blow Of Furious Winds, and a 'Making of...' DVD.

After four years of the box set release, Hortus Animae worked with Thrash Corner Records (USA) to release the collection Funeral Nation MMXII in 2012. Released worldwide in a double CD edition with new artwork, this collection featured the first self-produced album, The Melting Idols, which was not been included in the previous box set.

On 25 January 2013, the band announced the album Secular Music. It was recorded at Domination Studio (RSM) with producer and sound engineer Simone Mularoni (DGM, empYrios), who was the band's session bass player. It was released in 2014 by Flicknife Records (U.K.).

In October 2023, the band re-released a 20th-anniversary edition of Waltzing Mephisto as a 2-CD boxset, including unreleased bonus material and live performances, as well as a cover of “You’re Dead” from American singer-songwriter Norma Tanega, now known as the theme song of TV series What We Do in the Shadows. The band released a lyric video for the album track “Enter”. The box-set contains revised artwork and was released by Symbol of Domination/BlackHeavens Music.

== Members ==
=== Current members ===
- Martyr Lucifer - Bass (1997-2005), Vocals (1997-2006, 2013–present)
- Gianluca "Hypnos" Bacchilega - Guitars (1998-2006, 2013–present)
- Bless - Keyboards, Vocals (backing) (1998-2006), Keyboards (2013-present)
- Diego "Grom" Meraviglia - Drums (2002-2006, 2013–present)
- Adamant - Bass (2014–present)
- Manuel "MG Desmadre" Guerrieri- Guitars (2014–present)

=== Former members ===
- Lorenzo Bartolini - guitars, keyboards (1997–1999)
- Thomas Ghirardelli - drums, backing vocals (1997–2001)
- Claudio Caselli - guitars, backing vocals (1997-1998)
- Eleonora Valmaggi - keyboards, violin, female vocals (1997-2000)
- Marco "Karnal" Righetti - guitars (2000), bass (2006)
- Claudio "Iarsa" Nicoletti - guitars (2001-2002)
- Massimo "Arke" Arcucci - guitars (2002)
- Fabio "Amon 418" Bartolini - guitars, synth (2004-2006)
- Ecnerual - violin (2014-2015)

=== Session Members ===
- Scorpios - session guitars (1998)
- Vallo - session drums (2002)
- Moonbeam - session violin (2003, 2005)
- Claudio Tirincanti - session drums (2005-2006)

== Discography ==
- An Abode for Spirit and Flesh (demo tape 1998)
- The Melting Idols (self produced CD, 2000)
- Waltzing Mephisto (Black Lotus Records CD, 2003)
- Windfall Introducing Summoning of the Muse (CDs Promo 2004)
- The Blow of Furious Winds (Sleaszy Rider Records / EMI, 2005)
- Funeral Nation / 10 Years Of Hortus Animae (Sleaszy Rider Records, 2008)
- Funeral Nation MMXII (Thrash Corner Records, 2012)
- Secular Music (Flicknife Records, 2014)
- Godless Years (Satanica Productions, 2014)
- There's No Sanctuary (Azermedoth Rocords / BlackHeavens Music, 2016)
- Waltzing Mephisto - 20th Anniversary (Symbol of Domination/BlackHeavens Music, 2023)

== References & Press ==
- Review No. 1
- Review No. 2 (Italian)
- Review No. 3 (Italian)
- Review No. 4
- Review#5
