= Imagika =

American metal band

Imagika is an American thrash/power metal band. They have released eight albums on various labels.

Formed in the San Francisco Bay Area, Imagika were inspired by the thrash metal scene there, self-releasing their first two records Imagika (1995) and Worship (1998). The band released 2000's And So It Burns on prominent German label Massacre Records, but were "dropped" from Massacre by 2002. While searching for a path forward, founding member and vocalist David Michael quit in 2003. For a short time, Imagika contemplated continuing under another name. Instead, they found new singer Norman Skinner.

Norman Skinner left to found Skinner in 2010, among others with Imagika members Rob Kolowitz and Jim Pegram. Kolowitz had joined earlier that year. Guitarist Steven Rice and drummer Wayne De Vecchi, on their hand, founded Kill Ritual with singer Josh Gibson, guitarist Roberto Proietti of Eldritch and bass player Danyael Williams of Dark Angel. Imagika proceeded to disband in 2011.

Imagika's old members met during a Kill Ritual tour, and decided to reform to release what would become 2019's Only Dark Hearts Survive. Norman Skinner later joined Niviane and Bay Area thrash staples Forbidden.

== Discography ==
- Imagika (1995)
- Worship (1998)
- And So It Burns (2000, Massacre Records)
- Devils on Both Sides (2005, Mausoleum Records)
- My Bloodied Wings (2006, Crash Music/Sleaszy Rider)
- Feast for the Hated (2008, Locomotive Records)
- Portrait of a Hanged Man (2010, Metalville)
- Only Dark Hearts Survive (2019, Dissonance Productions)
