= Kill Ritual =

American metal band

Kill Ritual is an American thrash metal band. They have released seven albums on various labels.

Formed in 2011 in the San Francisco Bay Area, Kill Ritual consisted of singer Josh Gibson, guitarist Roberto Proietti of Eldritch, guitarist Steven Rice and drummer Wayne De Vecchi of Imagika, and bass player Danyael Williams of Dark Angel.

The band initially penned a deal with Italian label Scarlet Records, moving on to Golden Core Records one year later.

== Discography ==
- The Serpentine Ritual (2012, Scarlet Records)
- The Eyes of Medusa (2014, Golden Core Records)
- Karma Machine (2015, Scarlet Records)
- All Men Shall Fall (2018, Dissonance Productions)
- The Opaque and the Divine (2020, Dissonance Productions)
- Thy Will Be Done (EP, 2021, Blood Blast Distribution)
- Kill Star Black Mark Dead Hand Pierced Heart (2022, Massacre Records)
- In My Head (2025, Massacre Records)
