= Wastefall =

- Origin: Athens, Greece
- Genres: Progressive metal, Progressive rock
- Years active: 2003–2008, 2013–present
- Labels: Sensory Records; Sleaszy Rider Records
- Past members: (present lineup); Domenik Papaemmanouil; Alexander Katsigiannis; Nick Valentzis; Konstantinos Galimis (previous members); Christos Kyrkilis; Tassos Loukos; Kostis Papaleksopoulos; Ilias Kalivas; George Kanavaris; Stratos Haidos; Matthew Dakoutros
- Website: www.wastefall.com

Wastefall is a progressive rock/metal group from Greece. They formed in 2003 and temporarily disbanded on August 1, 2008. They reunited in 2013.

== Biography ==
In 1997 14-year-old Alex Katsiyannis decided to form a hard rock band along with some school-mates. The name of the band was Distant Dreamland. The songs were more in the vein of Deep Purple and Uriah Heep. After a year of rehearsals and playing and writing together the band changed their music style. Distant Dreamland played a mix of European and American power metal. People left the band and others joined. The band was renamed into Dead Man's Tale.

Dead Man's Tale released the self-titled demo CD receiving positive reviews. At that time Alex wrote the lyrics along with the music and played the guitar and Domenikos (Dark Vision, Lost Souls) performed the vocals. The friendship between Alex and Domenikos kept them together even after the end of Dead Man's Tale.

In March 2003, Wastefall was created by Alex Katsiyiannis and Domenikos Papaemmanouil. Later on, drummer George Kanavaris joined the band and Ilias Kalivas followed on the bass guitar. Wastefall signed, a record contract with Sleaszy Rider Records and released their debut album Fallen Stars And Rising Scars on July 28, 2003. Due to encouraging feedback, Wastefall began working on new ideas and creations for a future release.

Shortly, Christos Kyrkilis (keyboards) joined the band. After a while Ilias Kalyvas left the band and Stratos Haidos replaced him as new bass player. Additionally, Matthew Dakoutros (violin) joined the band to complete the line-up of that period. After a long time of rehearsals and composing new material Wastefall entered Fragile studios in May 2004 to record the follow-up album, to be called Soulrain 21. On November 7, 2004 Soulrain 21 was released again through Sleaszy Rider Records.

Again, the band lost their bass player immediately after a release. Stratos Haidos left the band and Nick Valentzis joined Wastefall. After Nick's arrival, Wastefall had to split ways with violin player, Matthew Dakoutros and drums player George Kanavaris due to musical differences. A few months later, Wastefall recruited Kostis Papaleksopoulos as their new drummer. In October 2005, Wastefall hooked up with Danish based agency Intromental Management, who immediately got the band signed to the American label Sensory Records. Wastefall's third album entitled Self Exile was mixed and mastered by Tommy Hansen (Helloween, TNT, Jørn Lande etc.) at Jailhouse Studios, Denmark, January 2006.

On August 1, 2008 the band announced on their website and on their Myspace that they were disbanding. As mentioned even though they had renewed their contract with Intromental Management and would play at ProgPower Scandinavia in October 2008 the band was not in the best of situations. Alex was studying in Crete (away from their base of Athens), Kostis Papaleksopoulos would leave to study at a musical university in England and Domenik had been in Germany since 2007. All this together with a difficult economic situation led Alex to leave the band. He send the following message:

Due to various complicated reasons and my personal choice to follow my academic studies, I can no longer be a Wastefall member. I want to thank all my band-mates, fans, Claus and Lars from Intromental, Ken at Sensory and Olivier at Replica for all the great times. Concerning music, all I have to say is that I'm going to continue writing music, in a very different style though, and not with the perspective of releasing something soon. It was a great journey I will always remember. I hope that other bands will be influenced by our passion so far and mark their way in the "rotten" music business. Dom, Chris, Nick, Kostis :Love, respect, good luck and apologies. C ya out there.

The rest of the band followed:

The beginning and vision of Wastefall was an idea of Alexander and Domenik and since Alexander wasn't available anymore the band's "core" was broken. After this, nothing will be the same so we got the difficult decision and we are really sad to announce the end of Wastefall.

On 21 November 2010 the website metalstorm.net announced that Wastefall had reformed again.

== Present line-up ==
- Domenik Papaemmanouil - vocals, guitars, keyboards (2003–2008, 2010 - now)
- John Aktypis - guitar (2014 - now)
- Nick Valentzis - bass (2004–2008, 2010 - now)

== Former members ==
- Alexander Katsigiannis - guitars, vocals (2003–2008, 2010 - 2014)
- Christos Kyrkilis - keyboards (2003–2008, 2010 - 2013)
- Tassos Loukos - drums (2010 - 2013)
- Kostis Papaleksopoulos - drums (2005–2008)
- Ilias Kalivas - bass (2003–2004)
- George Kanavaris - drums (2003–2005)
- Stratos Haidos - bass (2004)
- Matthew Dakoutros - violin (2004)

== Discography ==
- Fallen Stars and Rising Scars (Sleaszy Rider Records, 2003)
- SoulRain 21 (Sleaszy Rider Records, 2004)
- Self Exile (Sensory Records, 2006)
- Meridiem (EP) (Wastefall, 2014)
