= The Halls of Eternity =

Studio album by Ancient
- Released: 2 November 1999
- Recorded: February 1999 – April 1999
- Genre: Melodic black metal
- Label: Metal Blade
- Producer: Ancient

Professional ratings
Review scores
Source	Rating
Allmusic	4/5 stars

The Halls of Eternity is Ancient's fourth full-length release. The cover-art is airbrushed by Perre, a Flemish airbrush artist.

This is the first album to feature Aphazel, as band's vocalist. He recorded almost the entire album himself, except for drums, female vocals and guest appearance by Jesus Christ! on one song. Jesus Christ! was a member of the band, but he wasn't able to attend the recording process.

== Track listing ==
No.	Title	Length
1.	"Cast Into the Unfathomed Deeps"	1:56
2.	"Born in Flames"	3:59
3.	"The Battle of the Ancient Warriors"	5:24
4.	"A Woeful Summoning"	7:00
5.	"Cosmic Exile"	4:28
6.	"Spiritual Supremacy"	5:12
7.	"The Heritage"	8:12
8.	"I, Madman"	6:04
9.	"From Behind Comes the Sword"	4:45
10.	"The Halls of Eternity"	9:38
11.	"Arrival"	4:48

== Personnel ==
- Aphazel – lead vocals, all guitars, bass and keyboards (except I, Madman)
- Deadly Kristin – female vocals
- Krigse – drums

=== Guest ===
- Jesus Christ! – guitar, bass, keyboards and spoken word on I, Madman
