= Niviane =

American metal band

Niviane is an American power metal band. They have released three albums on shifting labels.

Vocalist Norman Skinner also sang in Imagika, Skinner and Bay Area thrash staples Forbidden.

== Discography ==
- The Druid King (2017, Pitch Black Records)
- The Ruthless Divine (2020, Pure Steel Records)
- Queen of Phantoms (2025, Rockshots Records)
