= Grave Party =

Studio album by Saddolls
- Released: April 25, 2014 (Europe)
- Genre: Industrial metal, gothic metal
- Length: 53:00
- Label: Inverse Records

Saddolls chronology
Happy Deathday (2009)	Grave Party (2014)	Lady Cry (2014)

Professional ratings
Review scores
Source	Rating
Subexistance	8,5/10 link^{[usurped]}

Grave Party is the third album of the Greek metal band Saddolls. This album features a major change in the band's sound, combining elements of Darkwave ebm with industrial metal. It also features a collaboration with Skinny Disco from the Swedish band Deathstars for the single Terminate me. The first single Lady Cry was also included at Sonic Seducer's compilation album Cold Hands Seduction Vol.254 that sold more than 60.000 copies in Germany.

== Track listing ==
No.	Title	Length
1.	"Rave To The Grave"	1:22
2.	"Lady Cry"	4:21
3.	"Terminate Me feat.Skinny Disco"	4:56
4.	"Bleed Sister Bleed"	4:41
5.	"Dancing Shadows"	3:50
6.	"Suicide Girl"	5:17
7.	"The Last Valentine feat.Joanna David"	4:00
8.	"Creeping Skies"	3:28
9.	"Angels (Making Love In The Dark)"	3:59
10.	"Sexy And Undead"	4:18
11.	"You Make Me Feel Like Nothing feat.Dave Shadow"	4:07
12.	"On The Road 66"	5:14
Total length:		52:00

Limited Edition bonus tracks
No.	Title	Length
13.	"Thirteen" (Johnny Cash cover)

== Band personnel ==
- George Downloved – Vocals
- Paul Evilrose – Guitar
- J.Vitu – Guitar
- GB - Bass
- Dennis M. - Drums

Guest musician:

- Joanna David - Female Vocals
- Skinny Disco - Guest Vocals & Screams
- Dave Shadow - Guest Vocals
- M-Teo (Teo Buzz) - Additional Keyboards

== Production personnel ==
- John McRis – Mastering
- Mironized – Design
- John McRis – Engineer
- John McRis – Mixing
