= Self Exile =

Studio album by Wastefall
- Released: 6 June 2006
- Genre: Progressive metal
- Length: 51:07
- Label: Sensory Records

Wastefall chronology
SoulRain 21 (2004)	Self Exile (2006)

Self Exile is the third album by progressive metal band Wastefall.

== Track listing ==
1. Intro (1:05)
2. Willow Man (4:04)
3. The Muzzle Affection (5:26)
4. Dance of Descent (3:36)
5. Another Empty Haven (5:54)
6. Strife for Definition (4:49)
7. Sleepwalk (4:37)
8. E.Y.E. (Eternal Yearning Entities) (4:44)
9. Utopia Fragmented (6:42)
10. 4 Minutes to Abandon (3:55)
11. Provoke the Divine (6:13)

Total Time: 51:07

== Reception ==
Professional ratings
Review scores
Source	Rating
AllMusic	3/5 stars
Brave Words & Bloody Knuckles	7.5/10
Metal Storm	8.6/10

Alex Henderson of AllMusic said that Self Exile had catchy songs despite being "slightly inconsistent". On the other hand, Metal Storm recommended the album for listeners of progressive metal.
