= The Cainian Chronicle =

Studio album by Ancient
- Released: 1996
- Genre: Melodic black metal
- Length: 66:06
- Label: Metal Blade Records
- Producer: Dan Swanö

Ancient chronology
Svartalvheim (1994)	The Cainian Chronicle (1996)	Mad Grandiose Bloodfiends (1997)

Professional ratings
Review scores
Source	Rating
Allmusic	link

The Cainian Chronicle is the second studio album by Norwegian black metal band Ancient. On an interesting note, the album’s length is sixty six minutes and six seconds long.

The concept of the first part of the record (tracks 1–4) is a retelling of the story of Cain, based not on the traditional Biblical tale, rather on the supplement The Book of Nod of the Vampire: the Masquerade roleplaying game. the first son of Adam and Eve and the first murderer. It chronicles his casting out, his relations with Lilith (the first wife of Adam in this interpretation) and the leading to the procreation of their children, the Disciplines of Cain. The three-part opus corresponds to three parts of The Book of Nod. "At the Infernal Portal" contains lines from Dante’s Divine Comedy, and the rest of the album is based on traditional Paganism.

== Track listing ==
All music by Aphazel except for 5 by Aphazel and Alex Kurtagić and 9 by Kaiaphas.
All lyrics by Kaiaphas except 5 taken from Dante’s Divine Comedy.

No.	Title	Length
1.	"Ponderous Moonlighting"	2:23
2.	"The Cainian Chronicle Part I: The Curse"	4:48
3.	"The Cainian Chronicle Part II: Lilith’s Embrace"	6:15
4.	"The Cainian Chronicle Part III & IV: Disciplines of Caine / Zillah and the Crone"	5:53
5.	"At the Infernal Portal (Canto III)"	7:06
6.	"Cry of Mariamne"	3:03
7.	"Prophecy of Gehenna"	4:04
8.	"Song of Kaiaphas"	8:47
9.	"Exu"	2:52
10.	"The Pagan Cycle"	7:30
11.	"Homage to Pan"	13:25

== Personnel ==
=== Ancient ===
- Aphazel - guitars, bass and synth
- Kimberly Goss - vocals
- Kjetil - drums
- Lord Kaiaphas - vocals, drums (5, 8, 9 and 11)

=== Production ===
- Produced by Dan Swanö and Ancient
- Engineered and mixed by Dan Swanö
