= Kaiaphas =

Brazilian musician

Lord Kaiaphas
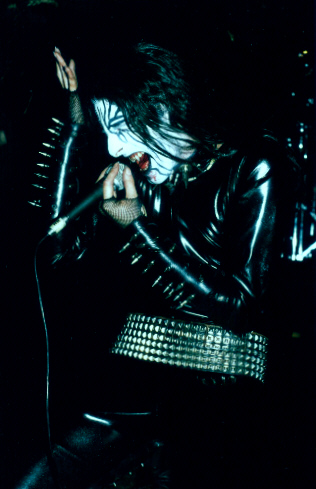
- Lord Kaiaphas live with Ancient in Biella, Italy, 1998

Background information
- Also known as: Lord Kaiaphas, Lord Vlad Luciferian, Zhyin
- Born: Valério Costa; 18 April 1974 (age 52)
- Origin: Rio de Janeiro, Brazil
- Genres: Black metal; psygressive trance; electronic body music
- Occupations: Drummer; vocalist; songwriter; record producer
- Instruments: Drums; vocals
- Years active: 1991–present

Valério Costa, known by his stage names Kaiaphas and Lord Kaiaphas, is a black metal vocalist, drummer, and songwriter. He is mostly known for his works while in the Norwegian black metal band Ancient. His current projects are Thokkian Vortex (black metal) and Minimal Criminal (psygressive trance). His name is taken after Caiaphas, the high priest during the Sanhedrin trial of Jesus.

== Biography ==
Born in Rio de Janeiro, Kaiaphas moved to Washington D.C., U.S. at six years old where he grew up. Most of his family members were musically inclined. His grandmother, on his father's side, Nadir de Figueiredo, was a famous soprano opera singer. Kaiaphas would later develop a strong passion for music. Throughout his teenage and adolescent years, Kaiaphas played drums and sang in several rock and metal bands, recorded several demo tapes, and played gigs.

Kaiaphas began his professional music career when he joined the Norwegian black metal band Ancient in 1995. The band's leader, Aphazel, was impressed by the work Kaiaphas had made with his prior American black metal bands - Grand Belial's Key and Thokk. Kaiaphas (then known as Lord Vlad Luciferian) replaced Ancient's previous member, Grimm. At this time, he changed his name to Lord Kaiaphas and began performing solely as a vocalist/frontman.

During his time with Ancient, he recorded two full-length albums for the well-known American metal label, Metal Blade Records. These albums were The Cainian Chronicle and Mad Grandiose Bloodfiends. Kaiaphas appeared in three music videos from Ancient, "Lilith’s Embrace", "Willothewisp", and "Um Sonho Psycodelico". In 1997 the band went on a European tour with Bal-Sagoth and Dark Funeral. Later that year, Mordgrimm Records released the Of Rape and Vampirism CD from Kaiaphas' former project, Thokk. The material from this CD came from their A Trance for the ever-toiling Witch demo which was recorded in 1995. In 1998, he went on an Ancient mini tour in America as well as another European tour alongside Belphegor and Behemoth. Shortly after this tour, Kaiaphas left Ancient.

In 1996, Kaiaphas discovered psychedelic goa trance, and by 1999 he had become a trance DJ.

In the fall of 1998, Kaiaphas moved to New Orleans, where he later formed a tribal gothic rock psychedelic rock band, called Oroboros, with his friend, Nicholas Syracuse. Oroboros played at the Burning Man Festival in 1999 and 2001. In this band, Kaiaphas played the drums, doumbek, djembe, and did some Tuvan/Mongolian style throat-singing. Their live shows consisted of tribal body paint, firedancing and fire breathing. Some of their tracks were later included in the soundtrack of the Canadian independent film, Monolithia. The band broke up in 2001.

In 2002, Kaiaphas moved to Brazil, where the trance scene was growing rapidly.

In 2003, Kaiaphas created a project of electronic body music called KAIAPHAS, with his friend, Victor Salles and female singer, T.A.T.I. In the beginning of 2006, the line-up had changed. Kaiaphas invited guitarist Lienhard, and new singer Lady Omega into the band. A year before meeting Kaiaphas, Lady Omega had sung on one of the songs from Ancient's Night Visit CD, released in 2004. Coincidentally, Kaiaphas had also made a guest appearance on that same album in the track, "Rape the Children of Abel". He also performed as a special guest in a few of Ancient's gigs in Greece in the European mid-2003. While in Greece, Kaiaphas recorded some guest vocals on a few tracks from the Greek black metal band, Crossover, which ended up in their 2004 CD, Dogma.

In 2003, Kaiaphas started a minimal/progressive psy-trance project called Minimal Criminal, under the alias "Zhyin" with Bruno Echoes. As of 2014, Minimal Criminal is Valerio Zhyin and its music often has a dark atmosphere and almost all of the tracks have stories or concepts behind them. The tracks also generally contain bizarre and obscure samples taken from films or other sources which further enhance the ideas behind the music.

In 2005, Minimal Criminal released their debut track "Reefer and Barbeque", a collaboration with established Swedish artist Krumelur, on the Intelligent Manipulation compilation CD. Various tracks have been released in a variety of compilation albums by many labels. In 2016, a second full-length album, Valerian Tales and the Zeuhllander EP, were released by Quantum Digits Recordings. In 2017, another full-length album, Alien Anthology, was released by Soulectro Music.

In 2006, Kaiaphas started his black metal solo project, Thokkian Vortex. The music from this project was influenced by the early works from Scandinavian black metal bands such as Darkthrone, Emperor, Dark Funeral, and Limbonic Art. There are also elements of classical/orchestral and dark ambient music. A split CD with the Hungarian band Aetheritus Obscuritas was released in 2007. The debut full-length album of Thokkian Vortex was released in 2014.

== Discography ==
=== Missionary Position ===
- Demo tape – (1991)
- Buy American – demo tape – (1992)

=== Grand Belial's Key ===
- Goat of a Thousand Young – demo tape – (1992)
- Triumph of the Hordes – demo tape – (1994)

=== Thokk ===
- A Trance for the Ever-Toiling Witch – demo tape – (1995)
- Of Rape and Vampirism – (Mordgrimm Records) – (1997)

=== Ancient ===
- The Cainian Chronicle – (Metal Blade Records) – (1996)
- Mad Grandiose Bloodfiends – (Metal Blade Records) – (1997)

=== Oroboros ===
- demo tape – (2000)
- demo CD – (2000)

=== KAIAPHAS ===
- Demo CD – (2005)
- Promo CD – (2006)
- Always Invisible – Orkus compilation 24 – (2006)
- Vile Vermin – Synthetics Magazine Get the Bombs of Music 2 compilation CD – (2007)

=== Minimal Criminal ===
- Reefer and Barbeque – Intelligent Manipulation – (Zenon Records) – compilation CD – (2005)
- Eulenschrei – Contact Lens – (Cosmic Conspiracy Records) – compilation CD – (2005)
- Disco Shit (live remix) – Contact Lens – (Cosmic Conspiracy Records) – compilation CD – (2005)
- Zulu Pazuzu – The Lurker – (Cosmic Conspiracy Records) – compilation CD – (2006)
- Trukket i Lyden (Minimal Criminal Moses remix) – The Plot Thickens – (Cosmic Conspiracy Records) – compilation CD – (2007)
- Dark Lord of the Synth – The Plot Thickens – (Cosmic Conspiracy Records) – compilation CD – (2007)
- Grave Robbers from Outer Space – V.A. Halu Beats Vol. 1 – (Halu Beats Records) – compilation CD – (2008)
- Phat – Ozone remix – Cherokee (Pure Perception Records) – compilation CD – (2008)
- Product Placement – Natalia (Minimal Criminal remix) – Tall Poppy Syndrome – (Cosmic Conspiracy Records) – compilation CD – (2008)
- Red Mongolian Deathworm – Primordial – (Bio-Sine Records) – compilation CD – (2008)
- Necrogeezer – Big Stone – (Vagalume Records) – compilation CD – (2009)
- Tao of Yoda – Geek Mythology (Cosmic Conspiracy Records) – compilation CD – (2010)
- Minimus Maleficarum – (Cosmic Conspiracy Records) – Full-length album – (2010)
- Baaraparchuterphobia – PhoboPhobia (Cosmic Conspiracy Records) – compilation CD – (2011)
- All Hail The Mountain King! – The Tipping Point (HorsePower Productions) – compilation CD – (2012)
- So Ya Lha (feat. Kencho Wangdi) – (Plusquam Chillout Records) – EP – (2012)
- The Lochness Monster – Cryptozoology (Cosmic Conspiracy Records) – compilation CD – (2012)
- Regurgitation – Pappedelic (Glitchy Tonic Records) – compilation CD – (2013)
- Kathaarians In Kira's Swamp – Hypno.Tembr (Glitchy Tonic Records) – compilation CD – (2013)
- Mary Poppin Pills (Hedonix Remix) – Intergalactic Jackhammer (Jaira Records) – compilation CD – (2013)
- Possessed By Papa Legba – Sinister Grin (Glitchy Tonic Records) – compilation CD – (2013)
- A Fistfull Of Steam – High Noon (Cosmic Conspiracy Records) – compilation CD – (2013)
- Kosmik Sh*t (with Hedonix) – Cosmic Riders (Phantasm Records) – compilation CD – (2013)
- PICK – Darkness (Minimal Criminal remix) – The Young Man On Acid (Ovnimoon Records) – compilation CD – (2013)
- Crimson Executioner – (Cosmic Conspiracy Records) – EP – (2013)
- Coffin Joe – Intergalactic Jackhammer (Jaira Records) – compilation CD – (2013)
- Merlin And The Dragon – MIDI Evil (Cosmic Conspiracy Records) – compilation CD – (2014)
- Saci Pererê (with Tijah) – Urobology (Uroboros Records) – compilation CD – (2014)
- Climbing Coconut Trees Backwards (with Krumelur) – Blurry Sequence (Zenon Records) – EP – (2015)
- KRUMELUR – Blurry Sequence (Minimal Criminal remix) – Blurry Sequence (Zenon Records) – EP – (2014)
- Fear The Djinn – Dusk Till Dawn (Jaira Records) – compilation CD – (2014)
- Samsara City Station – Mind Expander (Melting Runes Records) – compilation CD – (2014)
- Count Johan Malmsteen – Monsters Under My Bed (Melting Runes Records) – compilation CD – (2014)
- Mescalito – Catharsis (Glitchy Tonic Records) – compilation CD – (2014)
- TRIPINSTUMBLE – Arachnophobia (Minimal Criminal remix) – Arachnophobia: The Remixes (Cosmic Conspiracy Records) – compilation CD – (2014)
- A Call To Santo Daime – Tech Tales 5 (Electric Power Pole Records) – compilation CD – (2015)
- OPSY – Dungeon (Minimal Criminal remix) – Remixed Radiation (Soundmute Recordings) – LP – (2015)
- Valerian Tales – (Quantum Digits Records) – Full-length album – (2016)
- Zeuhllander – (Quantum Digits Records) – EP – (2016)

=== Thokkian Vortex ===
- Thokkian Vortex/Aetherius Obscuritas The Saturnine Alliance split CD – (Sleaszy Rider Records) – (2007)
- Into the Nagual – (Unexploded Records) – (2016)
- Thy Throne Is Mine – (Non Serviam Records) – (2020)

=== Guest appearances ===
- Crossover – Hatred Dogma – Dogma – (Sleaszy Rider Records) – (2004)
- Ancient – Rape the Children of Abel – Night Visit – (Metal Blade Records) – (2004)
- Aetherius Obscuritas – The Moon Shield – Black Medicine-Fekete Orvosság – Black Medicine-Fekete Orvosság – (Paragon Records) – (2009)
- Arcane Asylum/Zebulon Kosted – Atrocity is Silent – Shadow Project Omega – Shadow Project Omega – (Ziekte Records) – (2009)
- Mysteriis – 66 Infernal Legions – Hellsurrection – (2012)

== Videography ==
=== Ancient ===
- Lilith's Embrace – (Metal Blade Records) – (1996)
- Will-o'-the-wisp – (Metal Blade Records) – (1997)
- Um Sonho Psycodelico – (Metal Blade Records) – (2001)

=== Thokkian Vortex ===
- Huginn and Muninn in the Realms of Mist – (Unexploded Records) – (2018)
