= Ashes You Leave =

Croatian metal band

- Origin: Rijeka, Croatia
- Genres: Doom metal, gothic metal, death metal
- Years active: 1995–present
- Labels: Rock 'n' Growl Records; Sleaszy Rider Records
- Members: Berislav Poje; Marta Batinic; Matija Rempesic; Luka Petrovic
- Past members: Dunja Radetic; Neven Mendrila; Kristijan Milic; Vladimir Krytuija; Damir Cencic; Gordan Cencic; Dalibor "Insanus" Franjkic; Tamara Mulaosmanovic
- Website: http://www.ashesyouleave.org/

Ashes You Leave is a Croatian metal band formed in 1995 who is currently signed to Rock 'n' Growl Records. They have so far released two demos and six full-length studio albums.

== History ==
The band formed in 1995 under the name of Icon. Under that moniker, one demo was released, titled "...But Dreaming". After finding out about another band named Icon, the band decided to change their name to Ashes You Leave. They are named after the eighth song from Cathedral's album The Ethereal Mirror. Soon after that, they released their second demo in 1996, called "The Kingdom Before the Lies". The band was signed to the Norwegian labels Effigy Records and Arctic Serenades, but the band did not release anything before both of those labels went out of business. The band then signed to the German label Morbid Records and released their debut album, The Passage Back to Life, in 1998. One year later, in 1999, their second album was also released through Morbid Records, titled Desperate Existence. In 2000, The Inheritance of Sin and Shame was released through the same label. It outsold the band's first two albums and following its release, the band embarked on a European tour in promotion of the album. Afterwards, the lead vocalist, Dunja Radetic, left the band and was replaced by Marina Zrilic, who sang on the band's next album, Fire, which was released in 2002. After playing in several festivals, the vocalist decided to withdraw from Ashes You Leave to pursue her singing education abroad. Soon thereafter, Tamara Mulaosmanovic joined the band as vocalist and keyboardist. After starting recording in March 2006, the album Songs of the Lost was released in 2009, this time through Sleaszy Rider Records. In 2011 the band signed a management deal with Rock N Growl Records. In 2012 band released their seventh studio album, The Cure for Happiness, through Rock N Growl.

== Line-up ==
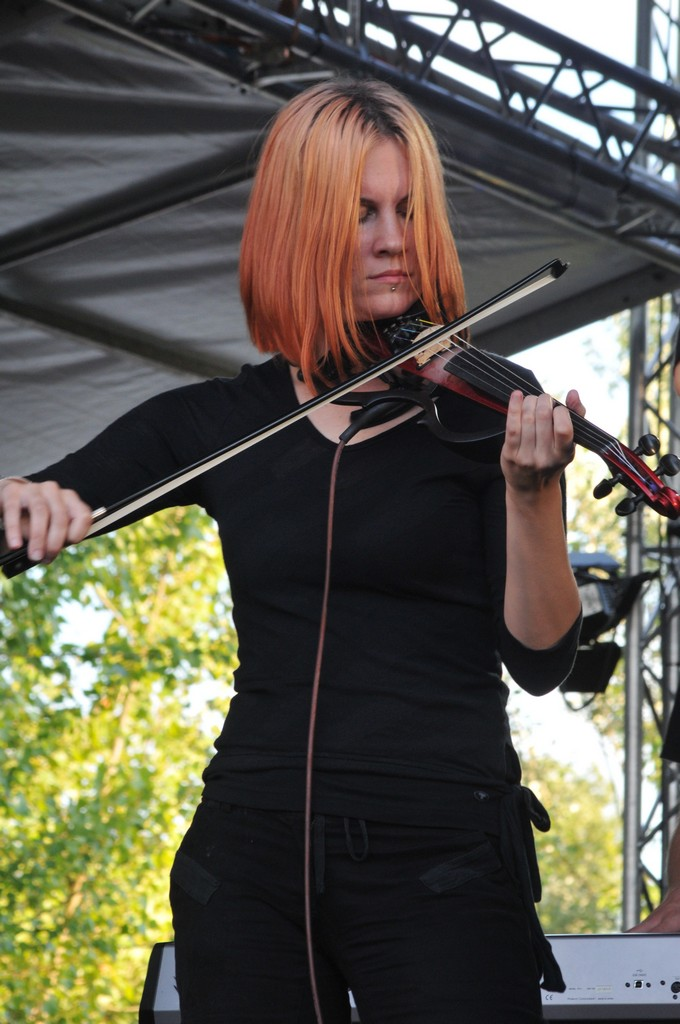
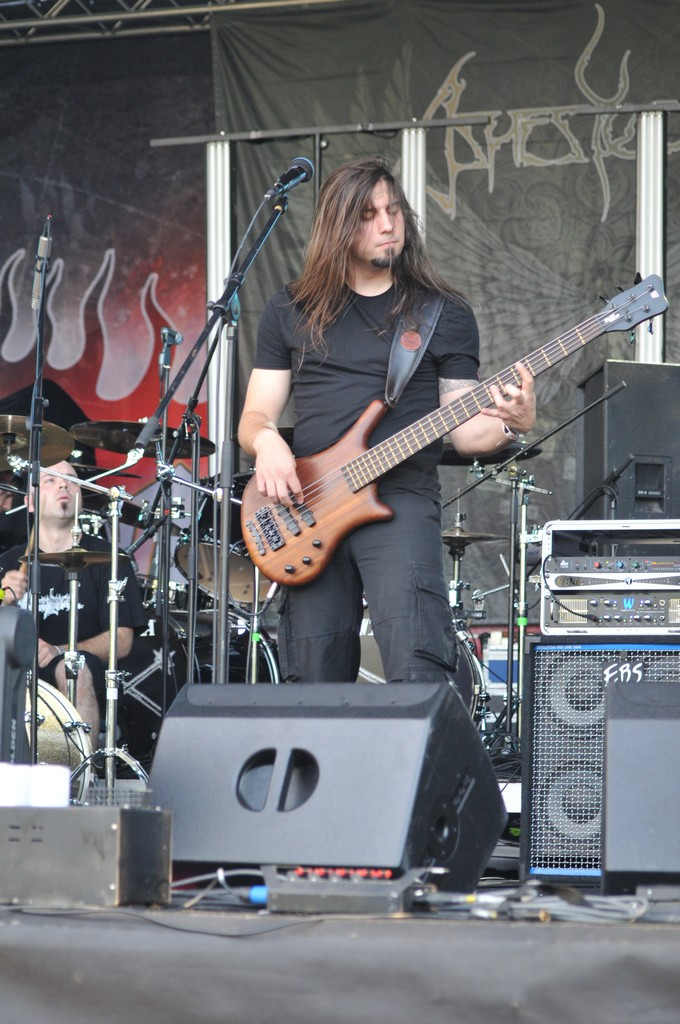
Marta Batinić and Luka Petrović at the 2009 INmusic festival

=== Current members ===
- Giada “Jade” Etro – vocals (2011-present)
- Berislav Poje – guitars, vocals (1998-present)
- Marta Batinic – violin (1998-present)
- Luka Petrovic – bass (2003-present)
- Dalibor "Insanus" Franjkic – drums (2007-2011, 2014-present)
- Tamara Mulaosmanović - Keyboards, Vocals (2006-2011), Keyboards, Backing Vocals (2014-present)

=== Former members ===
- Gordan Cenčić - Drums (1995-2002)
- Damir Cenčić - Guitars, Keyboards (1995-1998), Keyboards (2002)
- Doris - Keyboards (1995-1996)
- Lara S. - Violin, Keyboards (1995-1998)
- Loris Pomazan - Vocals, Bass, Guitars (1995-1998)
- Dunja Radetić - Vocals, Flute, Violin (1995-2000)
- Vanja Tornato - Bass (1998-1999, 2002)
- Vladimir Krstulja - Keyboards, Vocals (1998)
- Kristijan Milić - Bass (1999-2002)
- Neven Mendrila - Guitars (1999-2002)
- Marina Zrilić - Vocals (2000-2006)
- Domagoj Galin - Bass (2002-2003)
- Daniel Jurišević - Keyboards (2002-2005)
- Matija Rempešić - Guitars (2004-2013)
- Igor Malobabić - Drums (2006-2007)
- Armando Floričić - Drums (2011-2012)
- Ana Torić - Keyboards, Flute (2011-2012)
- Saša Vukosav - Drums (2012-2014)

Timeline

== Discography ==
=== As Icon ===
- ...But Dreaming (demo, c. 1995)

=== As Ashes You Leave ===
- The Kingdom Before the Lies (demo, 1996)
- The Passage Back to Life (full-length, 1998)
- Desperate Existence (full-length, 1999)
- The Inheritance of Sin and Shame (full-length, 2000)
- Fire (full-length, 2002)
- Songs of the Lost (full-length, 2009)
- The Cure for Happiness (full-length, 2012)
