= About Darkness =

Studio album by Saddolls
- Released: October 16, 2009 (Europe)
- Genres: Industrial metal, gothic metal
- Length: 50:00
- Labels: Emotion Art, Twilight

Saddolls chronology
Dead In The Dollhouse E.P. (2007)	About Darkness (2009)	Happy Deathday (2012)

Professional ratings
Review scores
Source	Rating
Subexistance	9/10

About Darkness is the debut album of the Greek metal band Saddolls. This was also the only album to feature a live keyboard player as a band member.

== Track listing ==
No.	Title	Length
1.	"Space Loneliness"	3:00
2.	"Bleed All I Can"	4:00
3.	"Misery"	3:23
4.	"Life Equals Zero"	4:33
5.	"Watch Me Crawl Behind"	3:57
6.	"In Your Lies"	4:07
7.	"Hopes"	3:13
8.	"Death Is Your Name"	4:55
9.	"Dawn Of Love"	3:59
10.	"Evilone"	4:09
11.	"Mistress Goodnight"	4:20
12.	"Don't Say Goodbye"	7:08
Total length:		50:00

== Personnel ==
=== Band ===
- George Downloved – Vocals
- Paul Evilrose – Guitar
- Daniel Aven – Guitar
- Miltos Demonized - Bass
- Darroc - Drums
- M-Teo (Teo Buzz) - Keyboards

Guest musician:

- Helen Papapanagiotou – Female vocals
- Vangelis Yalamas - Backing Vocals - Additional Bass
- Lord Exetheris - Growls And Screams
- John Ioannidis - Additional Guitars
- Oberon - Additional Keyboards

=== Production ===
- John Petrolias – Mastering
- Mironized – Design
- Vangelis Yalamas – Engineer
- Vangelis Yalamas – Mixing

== Videos ==
- Watch Me Crawl Behind on YouTube
- Misery on YouTube
