= Sotiris Lagonikas =

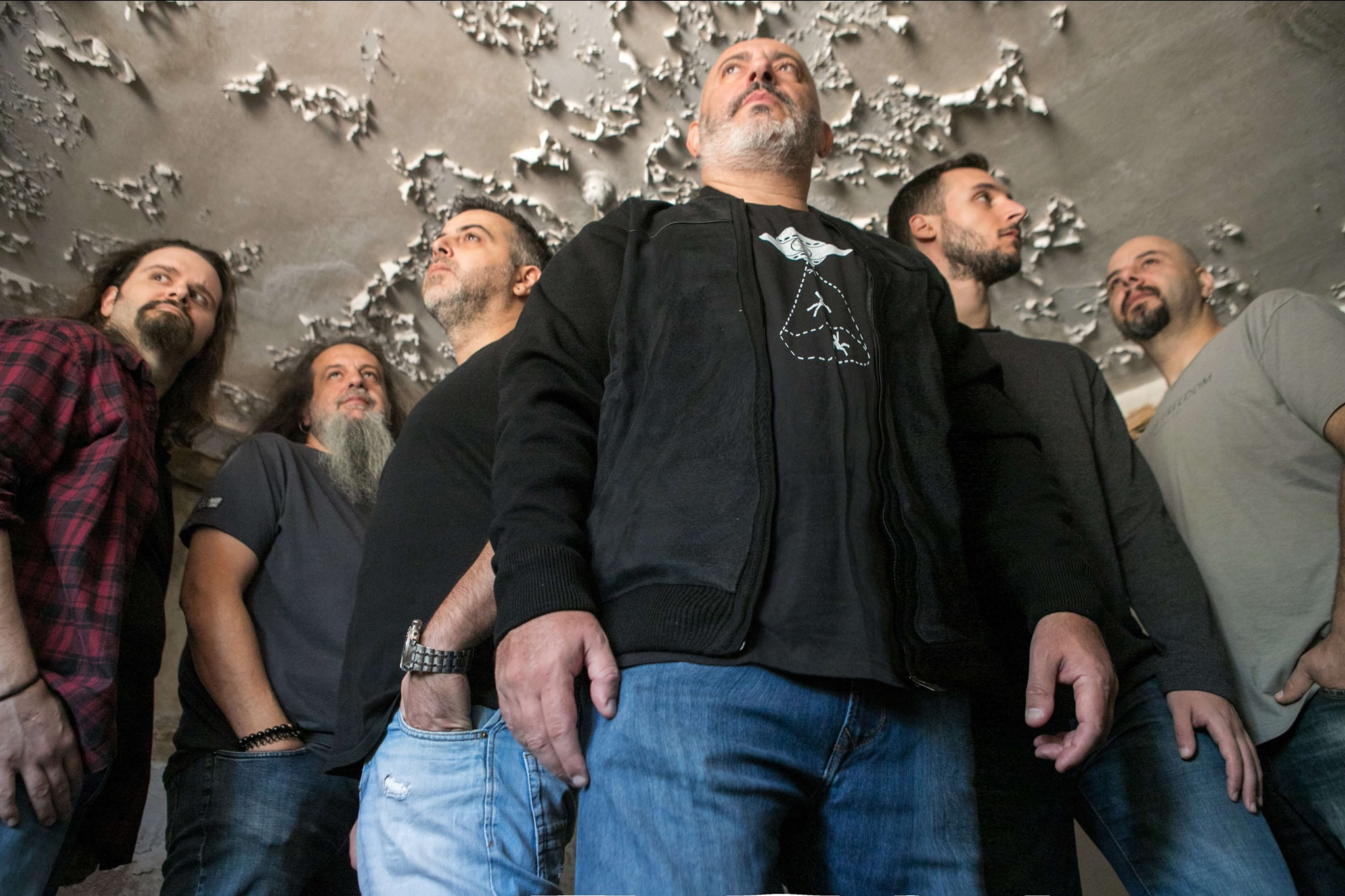

Background information
- Born: Sotiris Lagonikas; June 17th Piraeus, Greece
- Genres: Rock, hard rock, progressive rock
- Occupations: Musician, songwriter, arranger, producer
- Instruments: Drums, guitar, vocals, bass guitar, keyboards, harmonica
- Years active: 1984–today

Sotiris Lagonikas (born June 17) is a Greek musician, best known for his work as co-founder and drummer of the Greek classic rock group What's The Buzz?, as well as for his SL Theory music project, for which he has composed the music and written the lyrics while performing all instruments and vocals recorded on SL Theory's debut album which was released in 2010 under the title SL Theory – I. Two years later, Lagonikas released his second solo album, under the title Progressively Dark and by the spring of 2013, along with longtime friend and What's The Buzz? co-founder and bassist Chris Kissadjekian released under the band name Double Treat their debut album Wander Thirst through Sleaszy Rider label. The second album of SL Theory was released December 2014, under the title Different Space Different Time followed by 2018's live album Progressively Dark – A Concert For Group and String Orchestra which was released through Melodic Revolution Records in double-CD and DVD formats. In 2018, SL Theory signed a record deal with ROAR Rock Of Angels Records and released the album Cipher with the label.

== Early life ==
Sotiris Lagonikas grew up in the 1970s and was greatly influenced by the music of classic rock giants of the time, such as Grand Funk Railroad, Queen, Kansas, Foreigner, Styx, Toto, Kiss and many others of the like. Sotiris spent most of his childhood time, trying to replicate the moves of drummers on various music video clips, on his "imaginary drum set".

== Early musical career ==
At the age of fourteen, Lagonikas joined Four Wheel Drive, a local band of six, with whom he toured and recorded their one and only album Athoa (Αθώα) in 1990.

This album included the first song Lagonikas composed at age 10, titled "Isos meni kairos" ("Ίσως μένει καιρός").

== What's The Buzz? ==
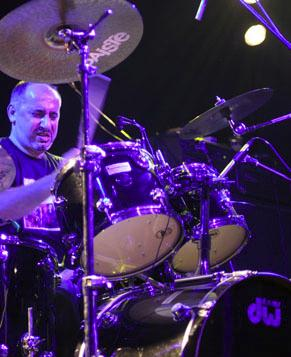
Sotiris Lagonikas performing live on stage

In 1992, Sotiris joined local musicians and friends, Chris Kissadjekian (bass guitar), Takis Kalatsis (guitar) and Jane Sabanikou (vocals) in forming a heavy blues/rock band which was later given the name What's The Buzz? after the synonymous song from Andrew Lloyd Webber's Rock Opera Jesus Christ Superstar.

What's The Buzz? recorded a number of demos and did many gigs all around Greece performing on stage alongside bands such as Manfred Mann's Earth Band, Spiritual Beggars, Cathedral, The Answer, and others.

In the year 2000, What's The Buzz? released their first self-titled album, however, plans for a second reunion studio album, featuring all four original band members, never came to fruition.

== SL Theory and solo work ==
In the spring of 2009, Lagonikas started working on his first solo album, under the project name SL Theory.

In his own words "Each day, I would get into the studio all alone, grab my guitar, close my eyes and let my imagination fly.. Listening to my songs, now that the recordings are completed, I can't even recall much of the process."

Lagonikas' SL Theory debut album I was released in 2010 and his follow up album titled Progressively Dark was released in the winter of 2012.

On 29 December 2014, the second SL Theory album, under the title Different Space Different Time was released, followed by 2018's live album Progressively Dark – A Concert For Group and String Orchestra and five years later, in 2019, the band released its latest offering, the album titled Cipher.

SL Theory is currently at the pre-production stage of their upcoming new and yet untitled album, aiming for a release in the second half of 2024.

== Double Treat ==
Lagonikas teamed up again with longtime friend and What's The Buzz? co-founder Chris Kissadjekian to form a classic hard rock duet under the name Double Treat. The band signed with Sleaszy Rider label, under which the band's debut album Wander Thirst was released in the spring of 2013.

== Discography ==
- Four Wheel Drive – Athoa (LP) (1990) (drums, composer)
- What's The Buzz? – s/t (CD) (2000) (drums, vocals, composer)
- SL Theory – I (CD/MP3) (2010) (composer, producer, arranger, drums, guitars, bass, keyboards, vocals)
- Sotiris Lagonikas – Progressively Dark (CD/MP3) (2012) (composer, producer, arranger, drums, guitars, bass, keyboards, vocals)
- Double Treat – Wander Thirst (CD) (2013) (composer, producer, arranger, drums, guitars, keyboards, vocals)
- SL Theory – Different Space Different Time (CD/MP3) (2014) (composer, producer, arranger, drums, guitars, bass, keyboards, vocals)
- SL Theory – Progressively Dark – A Concert For Group and String Orchestra (Double-CD/DVD) (2018) (composer, producer, arranger, drums)
- SL Theory – Cipher (CD/Vinyl) (2019) (composer, producer, arranger, drums, vocals)
