= Sleaszy Rider Records =

Record label

- Founded: 1999
- Founder: Tolis G. Palantzas
- Status: Active
- Genre: Heavy metal, black metal, hard rock, progressive metal, progressive rock
- Country of origin: Greece

Sleaszy Rider Records is an independent record label which was founded in 1999 by Tolis G. Palantzas. The head office of the label is located in Greece. The label is mainly distributed in Europe by Sony Music/EMI. The label also distributes releases in Greece from numerous labels, including Roadrunner Records, SPV, and Pagan Records.

== Artists ==
=== Current artists ===
- Aetherius Obscuritas
- Ancient
- Bomb and Scary
- Cold Colours
- Cain
- Darkwalker
- Dedication
- Depression
- Desert
- Dreamlike Horror
- Duster 69
- Edge Of Anger
- Fahrenheit
- Foundry
- Funeral Revolt
- Fragile Vastness
- Greifenstein
- Grenouer
- Hesperia
- The Illusion Fades
- In Memory
- Irony
- Jerkstore
- Lipstixx N Bulletz
- Liquid Graveyard
- Lloth
- The Lust
- Nocta
- Odious
- Of the Archaengel
- On Thorns I Lay
- Overtures
- Posithrone
- Prejudice
- Psychotron
- Redrum
- Ricky Warwick
- Sandness
- Satarial
- Shadowcast
- Snowblind
- Solar Fragment
- Soulskinner
- Sound of Silence
- Space Mirrors
- Spider Kickers
- Thokkian Vortex
- Through Art
- Thurisaz
- Vinder
- Voodoo Highway
- W.A.N.T.E.D.
- WARSHIP
- W.E.B.
- Weeping Silence

=== Former artists ===
- Ashes You Leave
- D-Noiz
- Deva Noctua Entropia
- Deviser
- En Garde
- Enemynside
- Fragile Vastness
- Hannibal
- Hellire B.C.
- Hortus Animae
- Imagika
- Insidius Infernus
- Kinetic
- Korrodead
- Midnight Scream
- Nordor
- Obsecration
- Overload
- Phantom Lord
- Pleurisy
- Powertrip
- Re-Vision
- Rotting Flesh
- Sangre Eterna
- Sister Sin
- Sorrowful Angels
- Sotiris Lagonikas
- Transcending Bizarre
- Underdark
- Uranus
- Wastefall
- Windfall
- Womb of Maggots
