= Mad Grandiose Bloodfiends =

Studio album by Ancient
- Released: 5 November 1997
- Genres: Melodic black metal; gothic metal
- Length: 1:07:04
- Label: Metal Blade Records
- Producer: Aphazel

Ancient chronology
| The Cainian Chronicle (1996) | Mad Grandiose Bloodfiends (1997) | The Halls of Eternity (1999) |

Professional ratings
Review scores
| Source | Rating |
|---|---|
| Sputnikmusic | 1/5 stars |

Mad Grandiose Bloodfiends is the third studio album by Norwegian black metal band Ancient. The album was recorded, mixed and mastered in Cue Recording Studios, Falls Church, Virginia during September 1997. This is the band’s last album to feature drummer/vocalist Lord Kaiaphas.

This album hearkens a rather drastic change of musical focus for the group, into a more melodic/gothic-oriented approach with an influx of clean/female singing, slower tempos and majestic stringed instruments, though much of the group's original black metal roots are still present. Lyrical topics also moved in a new direction, particularly with topics about vampires/vampirism. This has led to a strong backlash from fans and critics.

== Track listing ==
Music as indicated. All lyrics by Kaiaphas except 6–9 by Thorne and 14 by King Diamond.

1. "Malkavian Twilight" - 00:39 (Aphazel)
2. "A Mad Blood Scenario" - 04:23 (Aphazel, Kaiaphas)
3. "The Draining" - 05:26 (Aphazel)
4. "Um Sonho Psycodelico" - 04:01 (Aphazel)
5. "Sleeping Princess of the Arges" - 06:32 (Jesus Christ!)
6. "Her Northern Majesty" - 05:51 (Aphazel)
7. "Blackeyes" - 07:21 (Jesus Christ!)
8. "The Emerald Tablet" - 07:14 (Aphazel)
9. "Willothewisp" - 07:22 (Jesus Christ!)
10. "Neptune" - 02:37 (Aphazel)
11. "5" - 04:10 (Kaiaphas)
12. "Hecate, My Love and Lust" - 06:04 (Aphazel)
13. "Vampirize Natasha" - 02:34 (Aphazel, Jesus Christ!, & Kaiaphas)
14. "Black Funeral" (Mercyful Fate cover) - 02:50 (Hank Shermann)

Kaiaphas wrote lyrics for the song Sleeping Princess of the Arges in 1994 for his then-band Grand Belial's Key. GBK's version has a different music and can be found on the demo Triumph of the Hordes.

== Personnel ==
=== Ancient ===
- Aphazel - guitars, bass, keyboards
- Lord Kaiaphas - vocals, drums, percussion
- Jesus Christ! - guitars, bass, keyboards, cello, piano
- Erichte - female vocals

=== Production ===
- Produced by Aphazel
- Engineered by Doug Johnston
