= Proxima Centauri (album) =

Studio album by Ancient
- Released: 15 October 2001
- Genre: Black metal
- Length: 55:09
- Label: Metal Blade Records

Proxima Centauri is the fifth album by Norwegian black metal band Ancient.

== Track listing ==
1. "A Lurking Threat" 00:38 (Music: Aphazel)
2. "Proxima Centauri" 04:37 (Music: Aphazel / Lyrics: GroM)
3. "The Ancient Horadrim" 04:50 (Music: Aphazel, GroM / Lyrics: GroM)
4. "In the Abyss of the Cursed Souls" 06:00 (Music: GroM, Aphazel / Lyrics: Deadly Kristin)
5. "The Witch" 04:15 (Music & Lyrics: Jesus Christ!)
6. "Apophis" 02:58 (Music: Aphazel, GroM / Lyrics: Aphazel)
7. "Satan's Children" 05:31 (Music & Lyrics: Jesus Christ!)
8. "Beyond the Realms of Insanity" 6:46 (Music & Lyrics: Aphazel)
9. "Audrina, My Sweet" 02:46 (Music: Jesus Christ! / Lyrics: Scarelfina)
10. "On Blackest Wings" 03:16 (Music: Aphazel / Lyrics: Deadly Kristin)
11. "Eyes of the Dead" 04:00 (Music & Lyrics: Jesus Christ!)
12. "Incarnating the Malignant Deity" 09:32 (Music & Lyrics: Aphazel)

== Credits ==
- Aphazel - lead vocals, guitars, keyboards, bass (12)
- Jesus Christ! aka Luci - guitars, keyboards Carnygoat Music
- GroM - drums, percussion, backing vocals (5, 7)
- Deadly Kristin - vocals
- Dhilorz - bass
- Guest: Scarelfina - spoken words (9)
- Produced by Ancient & Jacob Hansen
- Engineered by Jacob Hansen.
