= Satarial =

Russian metal band

- Origin: Moscow, Russia
- Genres: Black metal Industrial Metal; Pagan metal
- Years active: 1993–present
- Members: Lord Seth; Angelica Satarial; Sept Satrial; Lolita Satarial
- Website: https://satarial.ru/

Satarial is a Russian metal band. According to some sources, Satarial are one of the icons of the Russian black metal scene.

== History ==
The band claims to be founded in 1989 by Andrey „Lord Seth" Shmelev under the name of " A.M.S.G. " (Ad Maiorum Satan Glorium ) and in 1993 changed its name to Satarial, although no independent sources support those claims.

Its music videos and concerts often feature references to Slavic themes such as pagan rituals, which has earned it criticism from the Christian establishment. The group has been highly critical of the Russian government led by Vladimir Putin, particularly after its invasion of Crimea in 2014, and has directly called the government fascist. Due to this the band has received a number of fines and eventually, a ban on performing in Russia. Coupled with a number of death threats the members received, in September 2021 the band emigrated to Poland, where it is residing and performing in the Lower Silesian region.

== Discography ==
- Ad Maiorum Satanás Glorium (1989) (Demo)
- ...And the Flame Will Take the Temples of Christ (1996)
- The Queen of the Elves' Land (1998)
- LARM (2000)
- Heidenlarm (2001)
- Tanz MiT ... Tod ... (2005)
- Latexxx (2006) (electronic project Seth & Satarial)
- Lunar Cross (2014)
- Blessed Brigit (2016)

== Videography ==
- Walpurgis Night (1998) (VHS)
- The Queen of the Elves' Land (1999) (VHS)
- Gothic Rush (2006) (DVD)

== Video ==
- The Queen of the Elves' Land (1999)
- Lover of the Night (2001)
- Hure Tod (2005)
- Horned One (2014)
- Manifest of paganism (2016)

== Current members ==
- Andrey „Lord Seth" Shmelev – Vocal, Guitar, Hardy-gardy, Programming.
- Angelica Satarial – Drums, Female Vocal, Analog Synthesizer, Piano
- Sept Satarial- Flute, Wind Instruments
- Lolita Satarial – Shamanic Tambourine, Norwegian Horn, DJing/turntablism, Ethnic Voice, Visual Art

== Past members ==
- Necromancer – Bass
- Orius – Contrabass
- Usurplague – Bass
- Orco – Bass
- Lepra – Drums
- Orm – Flute
- Vampirella – Flute
- Morana – Violín, Vocal female
- Aldea – Violín
- Juice – Vocal
- Soul – Vocal female
- Raven – Bass
- Demogorgon – Drums
