= Fragile Vastness =

Band

- Origin: Greece
- Genres: Progressive metal; Progressive rock
- Years active: 2000–present
- Label: Sleaszy Rider Records
- Members: Babis Tsolakis; Vangelis Yalamas; Evi Katsamatsa; Alex Flouros; George Ikosipentakis; George Anyfantis
- Website: www.fragile-vastness.com

Fragile Vastness is a Greek band, formed in February 2000 by Babis Tsolakis (drums, former member of Piranha and Retrospect), Vangelis Yalamas (bass guitar, former member of Airged Lahm and Retrospect), Evi Katsamatsa (piano/keyboards, a piano teacher), Alex Flouros (guitars, former member of Sound Of Silence) and Zacharias Tsoumos (vocals, tenor at the National Greek Opera).

== History ==
Their musical influence covers a wide spectrum of different kinds of music, like jazz, Latin and ethnic music, but they can be categorized as a progressive rock/progressive metal band. After signing a contract with the record company Sleaszy Rider, they release their debut album called Excerpts..., including the video clip for the song “Weep No More”, on the November 19, 2002. In the beginning of 2004, Zacharias Tsoumos leaves the band due to obligations and is replaced by George Ikosipentakis. With this synthesis, their second album "A Tribute To Life" was released in 2005. Fragile Vastness has been a support band for bands like Sentenced, Pain of Salvation, Rage, Primordial, Deadsoul Tribe, Fates Warning and Helloween

== Discography ==
=== Full albums ===
- Excerpts... (2002)
- A Tribute To Life (2005)
- Perception (2017)

=== Participations ===
- Don't Tribute Bad - The Songs of Firehouse (2004)
- The Ultimate Collection (Upcoming release)

=== Music videos ===
- Weep No More - Excerpts...(2002)
- Somewhere - A Tribute To Life (2005)
- ’’Frequencies’’ - ‘’Perception’’ (2017)

== Band members ==
=== Current members ===
- Babis Tsolakis - Drums
- Vangelis Yalamas - Bass Guitar
- Evi Katsamatsa - Piano/Keyboards
- George Thanasoglou- Guitar
- Vasilis Batilas - Guitar
- Elena Stratigopoulou - Vocals

=== Former members ===
- Zacharias Tsoumos - Vocals (2000–2004)
- Alex Flouros - guitars (2000-2011)
- George Maroulis - guitars (2006–2007)
- George Anyfantis - guitars
- George Eikosipentakis - Vocals (2005 - 2012)

== See also ==
=== Related genres ===
- Progressive metal
- Progressive rock
- Ethnic
- Latin
- Jazz
- Fusion

=== Related bands ===
- Deadsoul Tribe
- Dream Theater
- Fates Warning
- Pain of Salvation
- Nine Inch Nails
- Peter Gabriel
- Gary Moore
