= Proximus (disambiguation) =

Proximus is a Belgian mobile phone operator.

Proximus may also refer to:

- Proximus Group, a Belgian telecommunications company, owner of Proximus
- Proximus TV, former Belgacom TV, a digital TV service provider in Belgium
- Proximus blind snake, a species of snake

== See also ==
- Proxima (disambiguation)
