= Proxima =

Proxima may refer to one of the following:

== Film and television ==
- Próxima or PROXIMA, a 2007 Spanish science fiction film
- Proxima Starfall, a supporting character in the Nick Show Mysticons
- Lady Proxima, a crime boss in the 2018 film Solo: A Star Wars Story
- Proxima (film), a 2019 drama film directed by Alice Winocour and starring Eva Green

== Literature ==
- Proxima Midnight, a Marvel Comics character
- Proxima (novel), a 2013 science fiction novel by Stephen Baxter

== Music ==
- "Proxima", a song by the English heavy metal band Demon from their 1985 album British Standard Approved

== Science and technology ==
- ITV Proxima, a French paraglider design
- List of nearest stars
  - Proxima Centauri, a red dwarf, the nearest star to Earth other than the Sun, also known just as "Proxima"
  - Proxima Ophiuchi, a red dwarf better known as Barnard's star

== See also ==
- Proximus (disambiguation)
