= Mandragora Scream =

Italian gothic metal band

- Origin: Italy
- Genres: Gothic rock; gothic metal; doom metal
- Years active: 1997–present
- Labels: Nuclear Blast / Lunatic Asylum Records / Massacre Records / IROND Records / Fuel Records
- Members: Morgan Lacroix; Terry Horn; Furyo Biagioni; Max Rivers
- Past members: Lena Drake; Jack Lowell Halleyn
- Website: Official website

Mandragora Scream is an Italian gothic metal band.

== History ==
=== Early history ===
Formed in 1997 by a singer and front-woman Morgan Lacroix. In 1999, Lacroix recorded a demo album, with four songs.

In 2000, Lacroix was introduced to singer, guitarist and composer Terry Horn. The result of this artistic union was the debut album Fairy Tales from Hell's Caves, distributed in 2001 by German independent label Nuclear Blast/Capiranha records. A German critic delivered two positive reviews, calling the style melodic "gothic rock" in Sonic Seducer and "gothic metal" in Metal Hammer, respectively. According to the band, "Fairy Tales is definitely a concept album: a trip throughout the Dantean Hell, tormented by passion, anguish and insanity, where the character of Virgil is surprisingly replaced by an unusual bewitching vampire fairy."

In 2002, Mandragora Scream released their second album A Whisper of Dew, distributed by Nuclear Blast. Once again a concept album, centred on a vampire story specifically written for the band by Julio Angel Olivares Merino, horror-gothic literature writer and teacher of English Philosophy at the Spanish University of Jaén. Drawing inspiration from this tale, Lacroix composed the entire album lyrics.

=== Madhouse and recent works ===
“Madhouse” is the third album, published in the year 2006, by Lunatic Asylum Records.

In January 2007, they published a new CD/DVD called Dragonfly, which includes 2 videos from the album Madhouse ("Dark Lantern", "Blight Thrills") and 2 remasterized tracks plus 1 new song (”Dark Lantern Remix”, “Spiritual Leadin”, “Lunatic Asylum”) and in March 2007 a single track called "Jeanne D'Arc" by Lunatic Asylum Records. But They released it DVD in April 2008 with the album Madhouse and the single track "Jeanne D'Arc" with a bonus video, a new acoustic song.

Mandragora Scream's fourth album, Volturna, was released in November 2009. It comprised 15 tracks including two covers: "Bang Bang" and "Fade to Grey". A European tour was announced that included support acts from Christian Death and The 69 Eyes. The band have changed line up with Furyo on drums and Max River on bass. A fifth album, Luciferland, followed in 2012.

== Discography ==
=== EP ===
- Promo Track 99 (Demo) (1999)

=== Albums ===
- Fairy Tales from Hell's Caves (2001)
- A Whisper of Dew (2003)
- Madhouse (2006)
- Volturna (2009)
- Luciferland (2012)
- The Deathly Hallows (2020)

=== Compilations ===
- Nothing But The Best (2021)

=== DVD ===
- Dragonfly (2008)

== Collaborations and appearances ==
Mandragora Scream are also featured on various international compilations:

- Beauty in the Darkness Vol. 5 (2001)
- Mystic Art (2001)
- Nuclear Blast Vol. 6 (2001)
- Off Road Tracks Vol. 45 (Hammer 2003)
- Beautiful Voices (Nuclear Blast)
