= Ancient (band) =

Norwegian black metal band

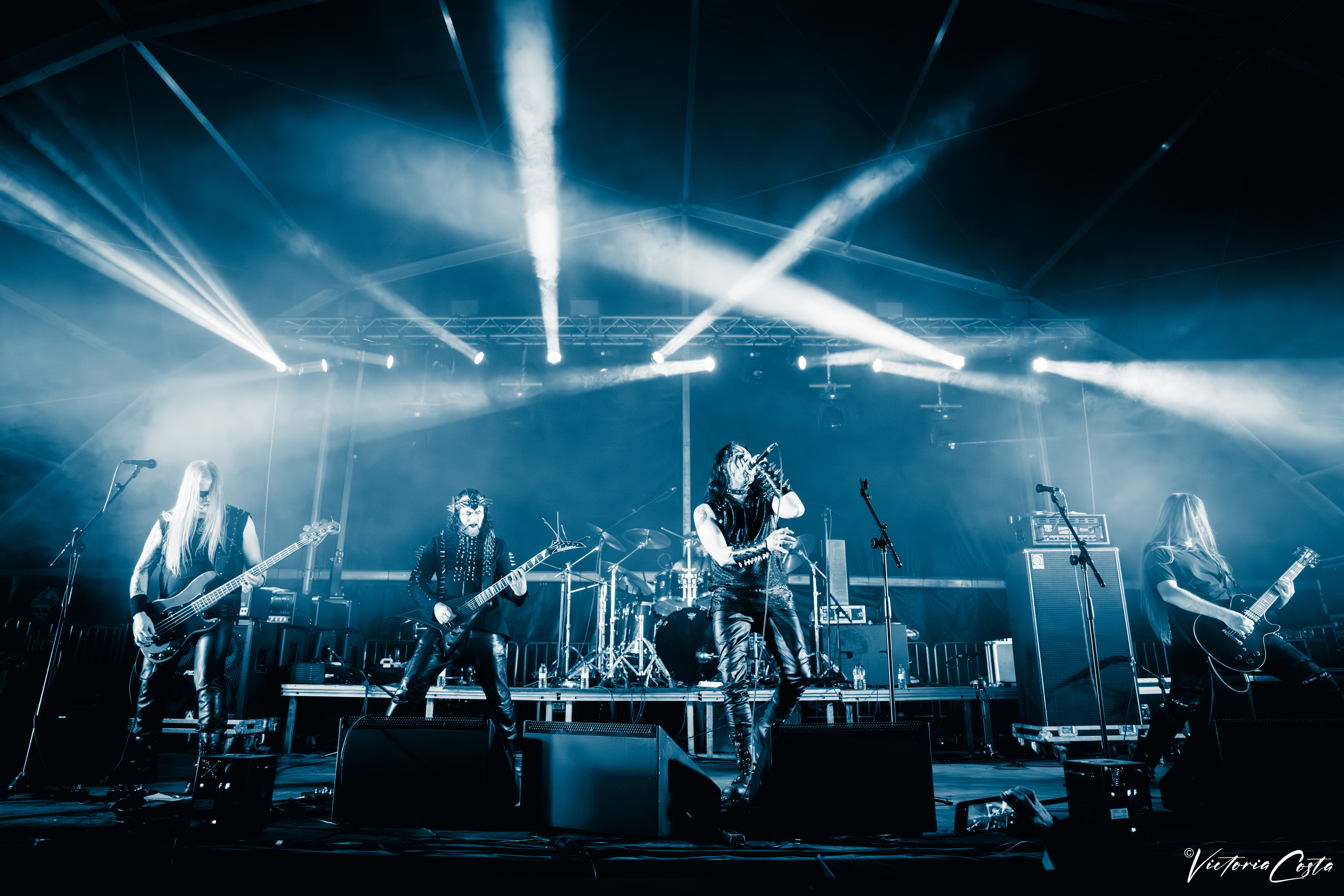
- Ancient performing at the Black Templar Festival in Spain, 2024

Background information
- Origin: Bergen, Norway
- Genre: Black metal
- Years active: 1992–present
- Labels: Metal Blade, Listenable, Sleaszy Rider, Soulseller, EMP
- Members: Zel; Dhilorz
- Past members: (see below)

Ancient is a Norwegian black metal band formed in Bergen in 1992. The band has released six full-length albums on Metal Blade Records and a variety of mini-albums, EPs, and special releases. Ancient had a raw black metal sound similar to Darkthrone. Beginning with The Cainian Chronicle, they moved towards a Nordic/atmospheric black metal akin to Emperor and cleaner production. After lineup turmoil, they added gothic-style instruments such as violins, a female vocalist, and synthesizers.

== History ==
The band started as a solo project of guitarist Aphazel in 1992. The following year, Grimm joined as drummer and vocalist. They released the Eerily Howling Winds demo in 1993 and the Det Glemte Riket EP in 1994. They signed to Listenable Records and released their debut album, Svartalvheim. After the release of the Trolltaar EP in 1995, Grimm left the band.

Aphazel moved to the United States, where he met Lord Kaiaphas of Virginia-based black metal band Grand Belial's Key, who became Ancient's singer and drummer. In 1996, the band signed with Metal Blade Records. Female vocalist and keyboardist Kimberly Goss and drummer Kjetil joined. They recorded Ancient's second full-length album, The Cainian Chronicle. Guitarist/keyboardist Jesus Christ, aka Luci, joined the band. They toured Europe.

In 1997, Goss and Kjetil left the band. With a new lineup, Aphazel, Kiaphas, and Jesus Christ began writing. They recruited female singer Erichte. Ancient released their third album, Mad Grandiose Bloodfiends. After a world tour, Deadly Kristin became the new female vocalist. Aphazel moved to Italy.

During 1998, Krigse took over drums, Dhilorz became the new bassist, and Lord Kaiaphas left the band. In 1999, The Halls of Eternity was released, with Aphazel singing.

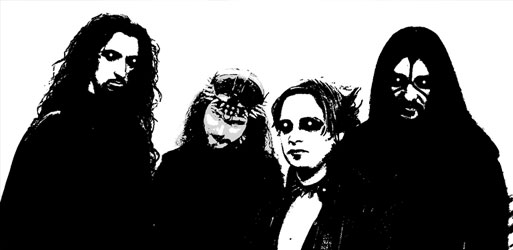
Ancient "Night Visit lineup" 2005

After Krigse left, Ancient found a replacement in the local metal scene. A new tour followed, including the band's first concerts in Scandinavia, and in 2000, Ancient played at Wacken Open Air with new drummer GroM, who joined in May 2000. The compilation EP God Loves the Dead was released in January 2001, featuring remixes, a new single and a cover of Iron Maiden's "Powerslave".

Ancient's fifth album, Proxima Centauri, was recorded at Los Angered Recording (Andy LaRocque's studio) and mastered at Sterling Sound in New York by Chris Athens. It was released in October 2001. Another world tour followed, including Mexico, Eastern Europe and Israel. Ancient moved closer to classic black metal, although more technical and polished. They began writing an album as a four-piece without female vocals.

In July 2004, Ancient released their sixth album, Night Visit. Written in drummer Grom's studio at the feet of the Italian Alps, and Jesus Christ! writing in NJ (USA); the album was recorded at Studio Fredman and mixed by Swedish producer Fredrik Nordström. Following the release, the band embarked on another European tour called "A Night VisiTour" in 2005, with Illdisposed as co-headliners and Final Breath as support. In the end of 2005, GroM left the band and relocated to Los Angeles, CA.

Aphazel and Deadly Kristin released an album with their side-project called 'Dreamlike Horror', for Greek label Sleaszy Rider Records in June 2005.

Live, the band featured Aleister of Faust (a cult Italian death metal band) on guitar and following Grom's departure, also featured Nick Barker (Cradle of Filth, Dimmu Borgir) on drums.

Ancient's original demos, including Eerily Howling Winds, were re-released in 2005 in an album called Eerily Howling Winds - The Antediluvian Tapes, after which the band went on hiatus.

In 2009 and 2010 they reformed for a new set of live shows in Spain and Portugal with Nick Barker as drummer.

Metal Blade has since then released a three-CD pack containing the band's three releases before the final Night Visit album: The Halls of Eternity, God Loves the Dead and Proxima Centauri.

In 2011, band's lead singer Aphazel had shortened his artist name to Zel and also announced plans for a new studio album. The album, Back to the Land of the Dead, was released in 2016 by EMP Label Group, with the group subsequently signing with Soulseller Records. In early 2016 the band recruited guitarist Ghiulz (Bulldozer) as session guitarist for live performances.

== Svartalvheim + Trolltaar 25th anniversary ==
For the 25th anniversary, Ancient toured Europe with the lineup Zel, guitarist Ghiulz (Death SS/Bulldozer), bassist Dhilorz and drummer Volkun (Morost/Sovrag). The tour began early 2020 to celebrate the jubilee of early records Svartalvheim and Trolltaar and went into a forced pause due to the lockdowns.

In December 2022 former drummer Grimm made a guest appearance on the concerts in the Netherlands and Belgium, joining to perform vocals on two songs (Eerily Howling Winds and Likferd). It was his first appearance with the band in 28 years.

== The Cainian Chronicle anniversary ==
In 2023, Lord Kaiaphas joined Ancient as a guest in the Cainian Chronicle tour, performing the entire album. The first performance of the tour was at the Cosmic Void Festival in London. Since then, Ancient has been touring in Europe and other countries performing the album.

== Band members ==
- Zel (formerly known as Aphazel) – guitar, keyboards (1992–present), lead vocals (1998–present), bass guitar (1992–1998), drum machine (1992–1993)
- Lord Kaiaphas – vocals (1995–1999, 2023-present ), drums (1995–1998)
- Dhilorz – bass guitar (1999–present)

Former members

- Grimm – vocals and drums (1993–1995)
- Kimberly Goss – female vocals (1995–1997), keyboards (1997)
- Deadly Kristin (born Cristina Parascandolo; changed name to Hayam Nur as Sufi) – vocals and black arts (1998–2003)
- Kjetil – drums (1996–1997)
- Erichte – female vocals (1997–1998)
- Krigse – drums (1998–2000)
- GroM – drums (2000–2005)
- Jesus Christ! (aka Luci) – keyboards (1997—2004), guitar (1997–1998), bass guitar (1997–1998), piano, cello (1997–1998) Carnygoat Music
- Nick Barker – drums (2009–2017)

Timeline

Guest musicians

- Neviah Luneville – vocals on "Envision the Beast" from Night Visit
- Lady Omega – vocals on "Out in the Haunted Woods" from Night Visit
- Moonbeam of Iblis – violin on "Envision the Beast" and "Night of the Stygian Souls" from Night Visit
- Alex Azzali – additional guitars on "Night of the Stygian Souls" from Night Visit

Live Members

- Lazarus – keyboards (2002)
- Scorpios – bass guitar (1998–1999)
- Ghiulz Borroni – guitar (2015–present)
- Ivan McSimon – guitar (2017–?)
- Mirko Soncini – drums (2021–?)
- Volkun – drums (2022–?)
- Arjan Peeks – bass/guitar (2023–?)

== Discography ==
Studio albums

- Svartalvheim (1994)
- The Cainian Chronicle (1996)
- Mad Grandiose Bloodfiends (1997)
- The Halls of Eternity (1999)
- Proxima Centauri (2001)
- Night Visit (2004)
- Back to the Land of the Dead (2016)

EPs

- Det Glemte Riket (1994)
- Trolltaar (1995)

Demos

- Eerily Howling Winds (1993)

Compilations

- Det Glemte Riket (1999)
- God Loves the Dead (2001)
- Eerily Howling Winds - The Antediluvian Tapes (2005)
