= Metuje =

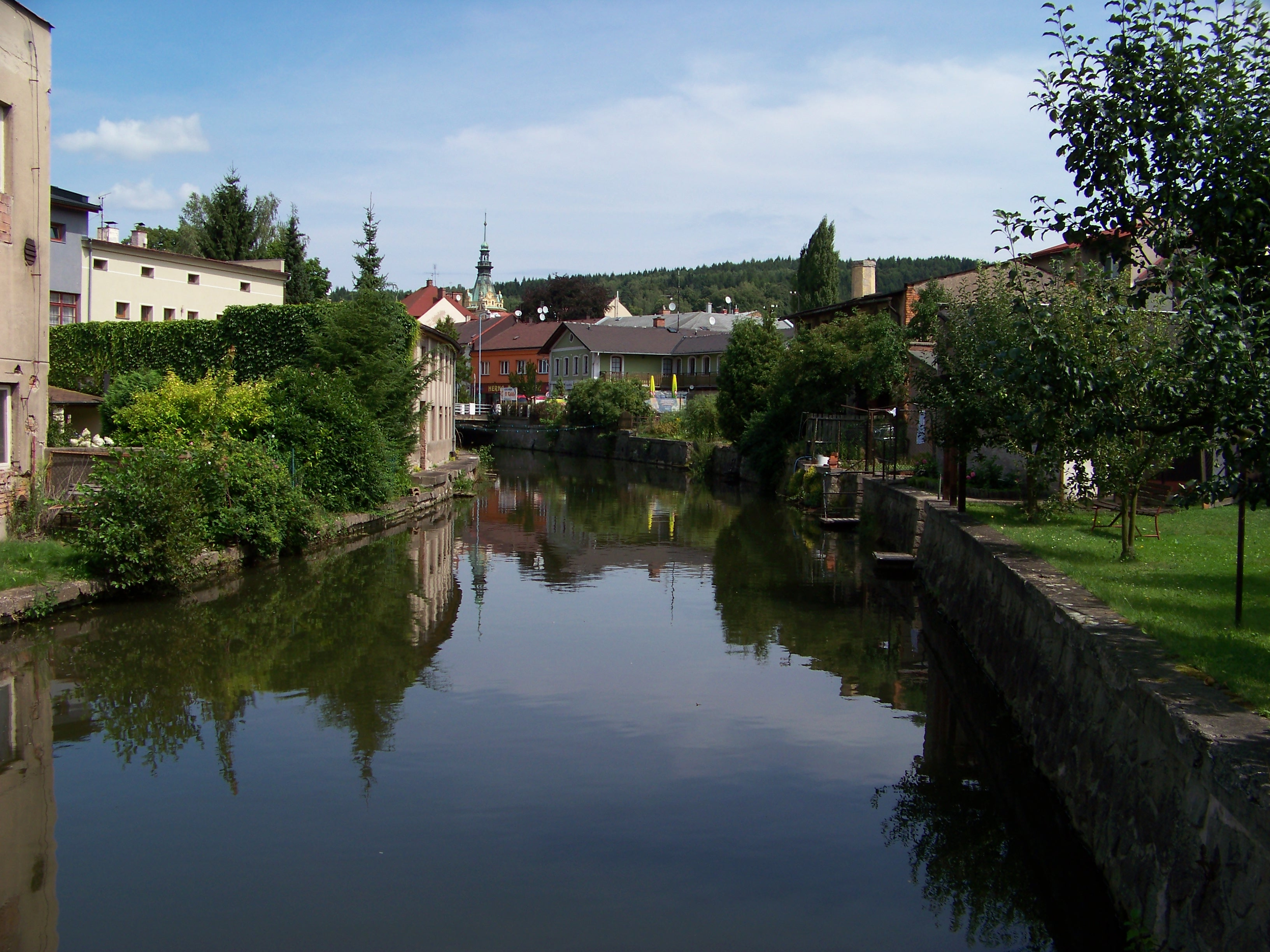
- The Metuje in Hronov

Location
- Country: Czech Republic
- Region: Hradec Králové

Physical characteristics
- Source
  - location: Jívka, Broumov Highlands
  - coordinates: 50°36′29″N 16°4′52″E
  - elevation: 628 m (2,060 ft)
- Mouth
  - location: Elbe
  - coordinates: 50°20′17″N 15°55′5″E
  - elevation: 247 m (810 ft)
- Length: 78.2 km (48.6 mi)
- Basin size: 607.6 km^{2} (234.6 sq mi)
- Discharge
  - average: 6.08 m^{3}/s (215 cu ft/s) near estuary

Basin features
- Progression: Elbe→ North Sea

The Metuje (Czech pronunciation: [ˈmɛtujɛ]; German: Mettau) is a river in the Czech Republic, a left tributary of the Elbe River. It flows through the Hradec Králové Region. It is 78.2 km (48.6 mi) long.

== Etymology ==
The river was originally named Medhuje. It was derived from the Illyrian word medh or met, meaning 'middle'. It meant "the middle river", i.e. "the river lying between the rivers Úpa and Orlice".

== Characteristic ==
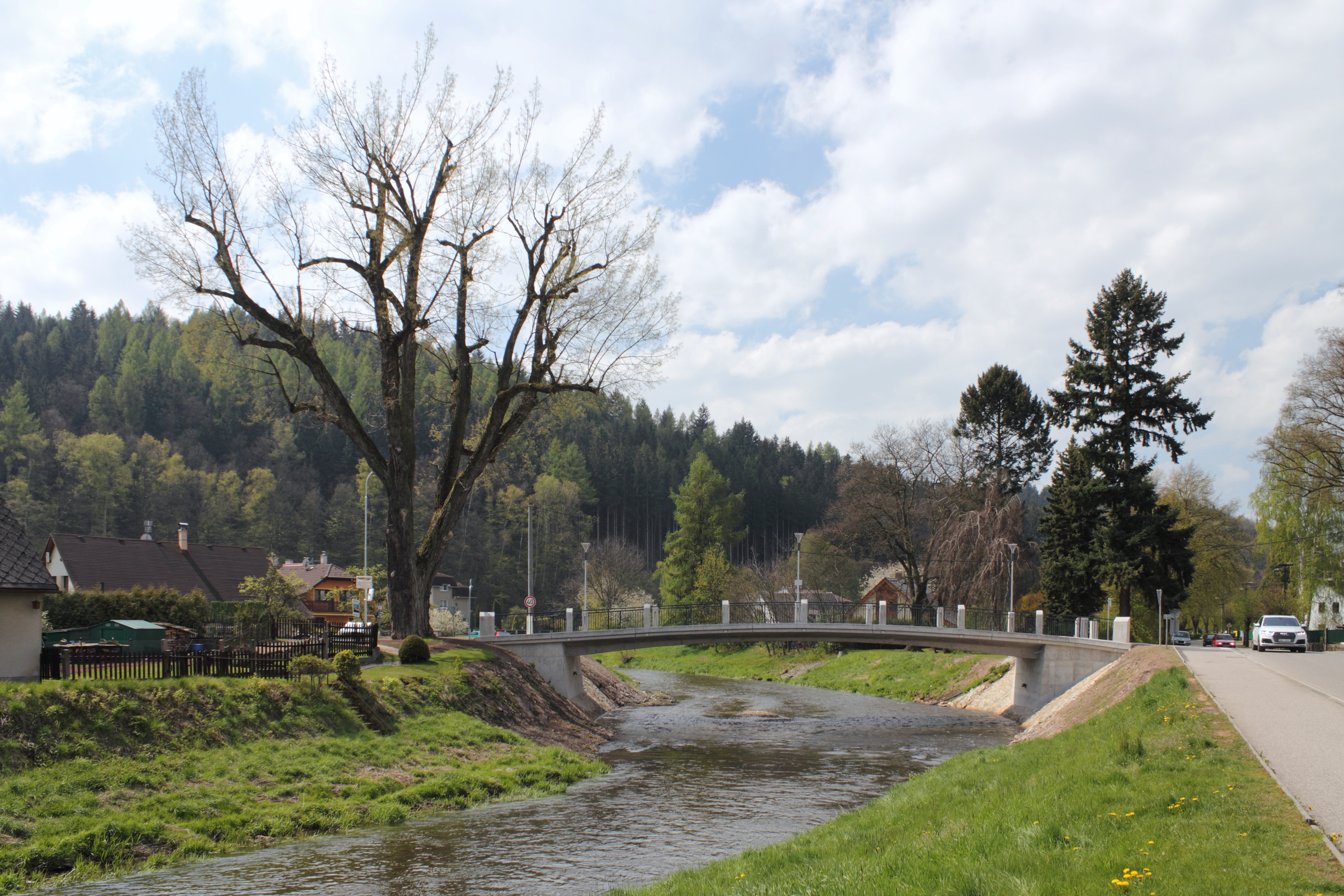
The Metuje in Náchod-Běloves

The Metuje originates in the territory of Jívka in the Broumov Highlands at an elevation of 628 m (2,060 ft) and flows to Jaroměř, where it enters the Elbe River at an elevation of 247 m (810 ft). It is 78.2 km (48.6 mi) long. Its drainage basin has an area of 607.6 km^{2} (234.6 sq mi), of which 511.4 km^{2} (197.5 sq mi) in the Czech Republic and rest in Poland.

In Nahořany-Dolsko the flow of the river divides. The secondary flow is called Stará řeka ('old river') and was once the main bed of the Metuje. They join again in Šestajovice, but after a few hundred metres it splits again into a secondary stream, which is called Stará Metuje ('old Metuje'). The streams then join a few hundred metres before the confluence of the Metuje with the Elbe.

The longest tributaries of the Metuje are:

Tributary	Length (km)	River km	Side
Dřevíč	21.8	46.4	right
Olešenka	20.4	27.4	left
Klikawa / Střela	15.1	38.2	left
Rozkoš	13.3	8.3	right
Židovka / Żydawka	12.7	50.6	left
Janovský potok	12.2	17.8	left
Radechovka	9.2	34.8	right
Jasenná	9.1	3.0	left

== Course ==
The most notable settlement on the river is the town of Náchod. The river flows through the municipal territories of Jívka, Adršpach, Teplice nad Metují, Česká Metuje, Velké Petrovice, Bezděkov nad Metují, Hronov, Velké Poříčí, Náchod, Přibyslav, Jestřebí, Nové Město nad Metují, Nahořany, Šestajovice, Rychnovek and Jaroměř.

== Bodies of water ==
There are 404 bodies of water in the basin area. The largest of them is the Rozkoš Reservoir with an area of 1,001 ha (2,470 acres), built on the Rozkoš Stream. There are no reservoirs or fishponds built directly on the Metuje.

== Protection of nature ==
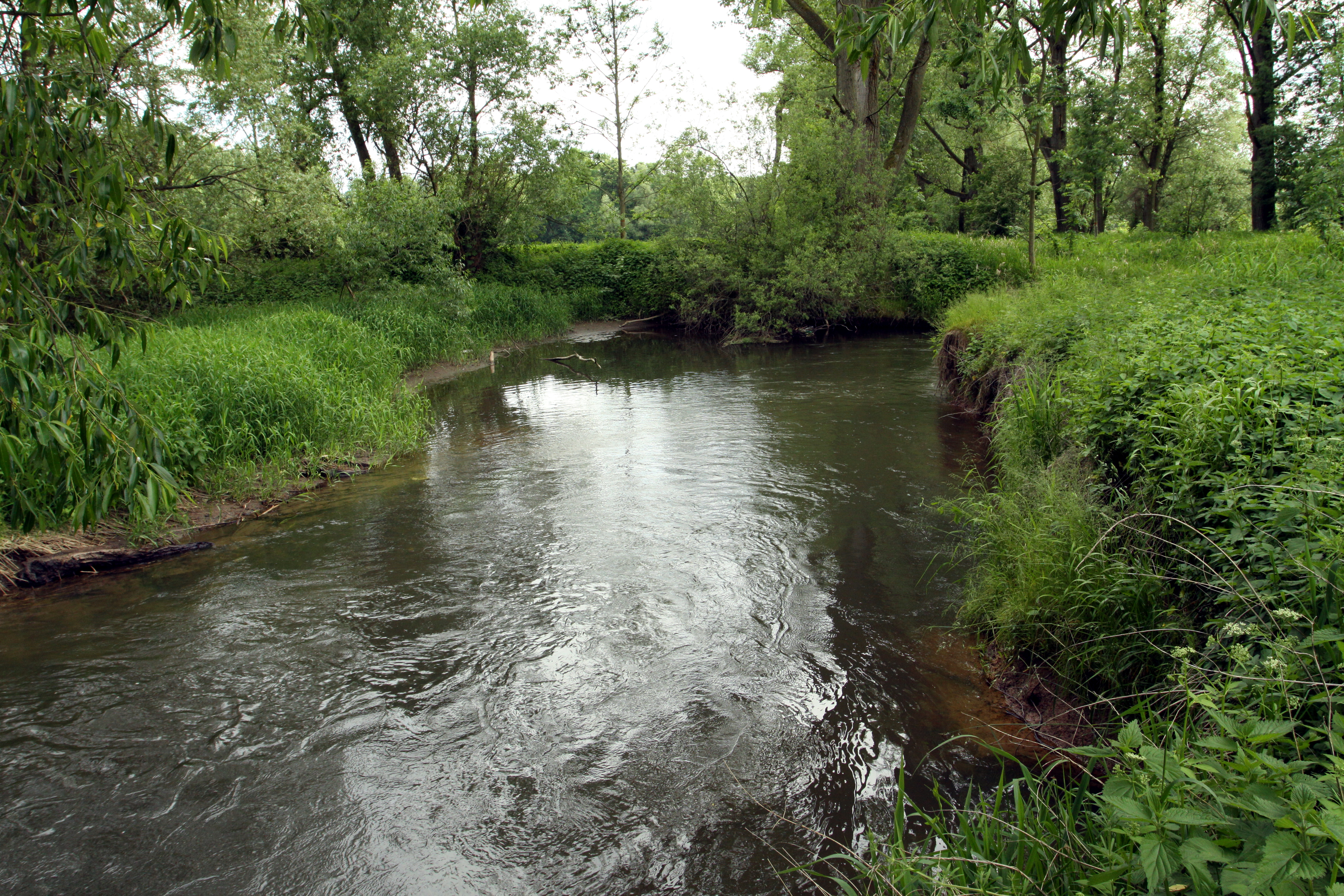
Stará Metuje

In the area between the Metuje and Stará Metuje is the privately owned Josefov Meadows Bird Reserve. In the reserve, 30 species of fish have been documented in the river. In addition, the area is home to many species of protected birds, amphibians and insects, such as green snaketail, which is critically endangered in the Czech Republic. For its protection, the Stará Metuje Nature Monument with an area of 21.9 ha (54 acres) was also declared along the entire course of the Stará Metuje.

== See also ==
- List of rivers of the Czech Republic
