= Bezděkov nad Metují =

- Municipality
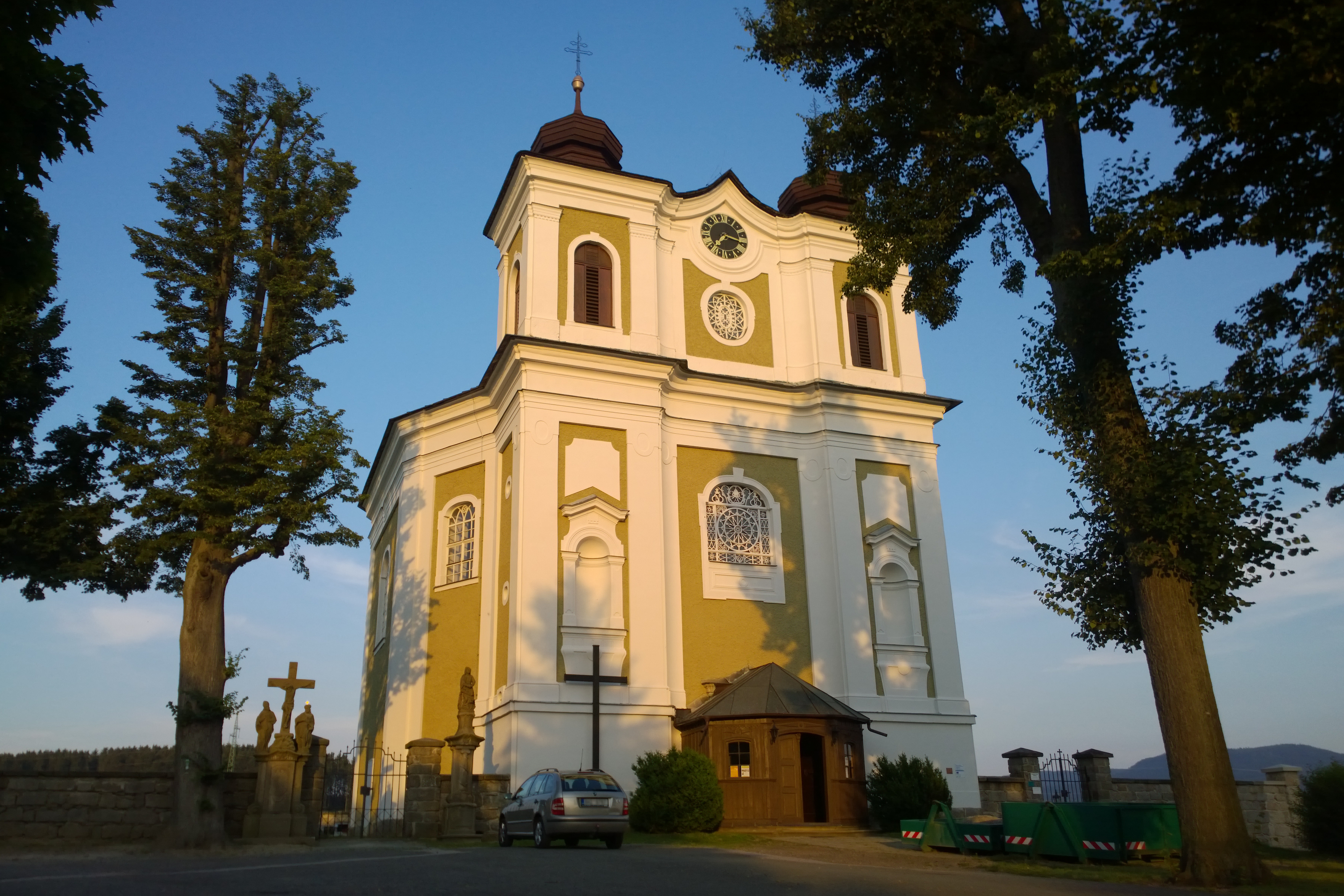
- Church of Saint Procopius

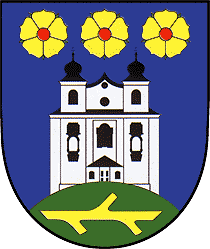
- Flag Coat of arms

- Location in the Czech Republic
- Coordinates: 50°30′35″N 16°13′46″E
- Country: Czech Republic
- Region: Hradec Králové
- District: Náchod
- First mentioned: 1358

Area
  - Total: 5.17 km^{2} (2.00 sq mi)
- Elevation: 476 m (1,562 ft)

Population (2026-01-01)
  - Total: 642
  - Density: 124/km^{2} (322/sq mi)
- Time zone: UTC+1 (CET)
  - Summer (DST): UTC+2 (CEST)
- Postal code: 549 64
- Website: www.bezdekov.org

Bezděkov nad Metují (German: Bösig an der Mettau) is a municipality and village in Náchod District in the Hradec Králové Region of the Czech Republic. It has about 600 inhabitants. It is known for the Church of Saint Procopius, protected as a national cultural monument.

== Etymology ==
The name Bezděkov is derived from the personal name Bezděk, meaning "Bezděk's (court)".

== Geography ==
Bezděkov nad Metují is located about 11 kilometres (7 mi) northeast of Náchod and 29 km (18 mi) south of the Polish city of Wałbrzych. It lies in the Broumov Highlands. The municipality is situated on the left bank of the Metuje River, on a plateau above the river. Bezděkov nad Metují entirely lies within the Broumovsko Protected Landscape Area.

== History ==
The first written mention of Bezděkov nad Metují is from 1358. It was probably founded before 1241. The railway was built in 1873–1875.

== Demographics ==
Historical population

Year	Pop.	±%
1869	759	—
1880	778	+2.5%
1890	775	−0.4%
1900	723	−6.7%
1910	708	−2.1%

Year	Pop.	±%
1921	656	−7.3%
1930	697	+6.2%
1950	602	−13.6%
1961	571	−5.1%
1970	523	−8.4%

Year	Pop.	±%
1980	486	−7.1%
1991	482	−0.8%
2001	510	+5.8%
2011	504	−1.2%
2021	608	+20.6%

Source: Censuses

== Transport ==
The train station in the territory of Bezděkov nad Metují is named Police nad Metují after the neighbouring town of Police nad Metují. It is located on the railway line Broumov–Starkoč.

== Sights ==
The main landmark of Bezděkov nad Metují is the Church of Saint Procopius. It was built in the Baroque style in 1724–1726 according to the design by architect Kilian Ignaz Dientzenhofer. For its value it has been protected as a national cultural monument since 2022.
