= Šestajovice =

Šestajovice may refer to places in the Czech Republic:

- Šestajovice (Náchod District), a municipality and village in the Hradec Králové Region
- Šestajovice (Prague-East District), a municipality and village in the Central Bohemian Region
