= Velké Poříčí =

- Market town
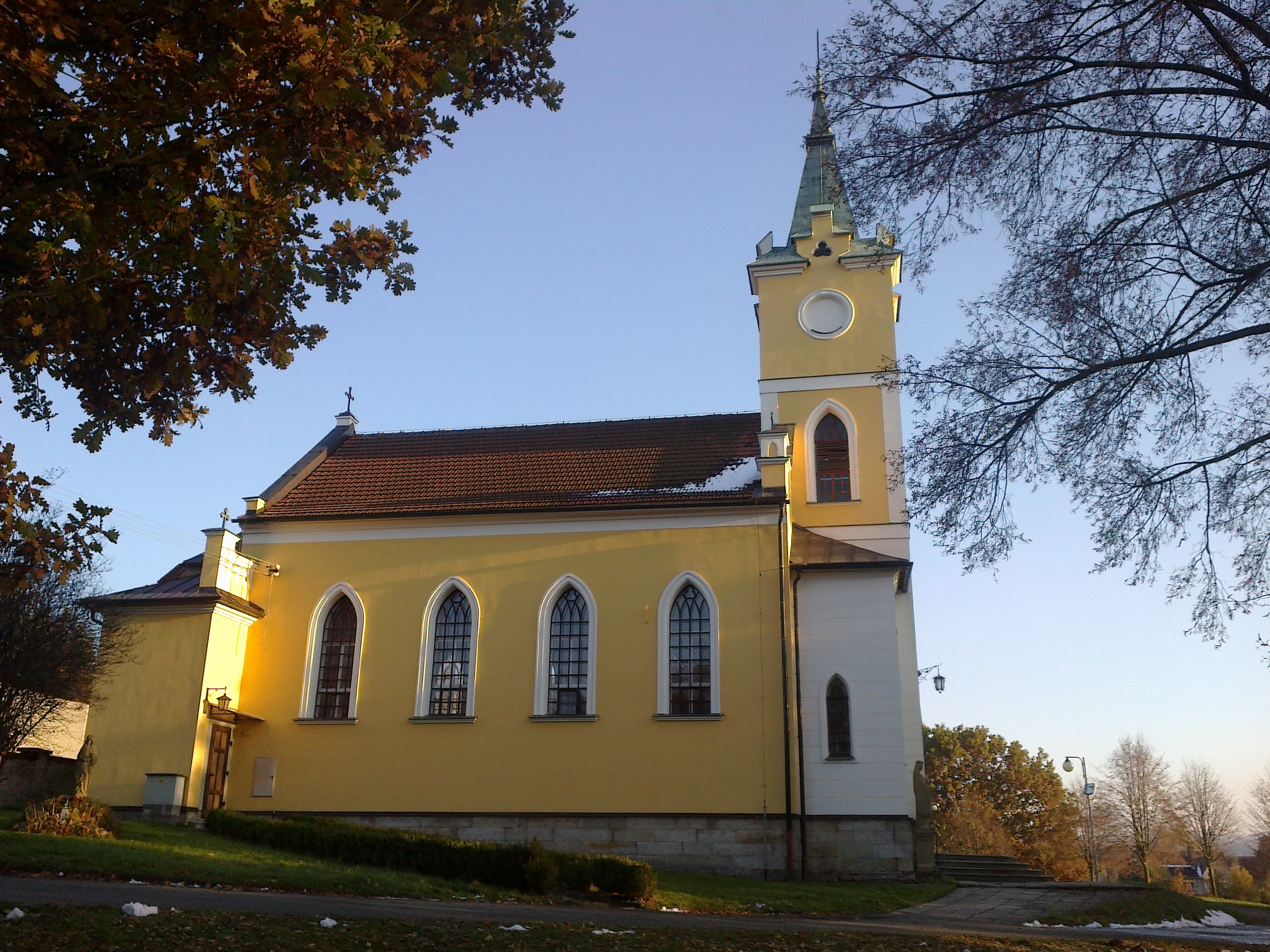
- Church of the Visitation of the Virgin Mary

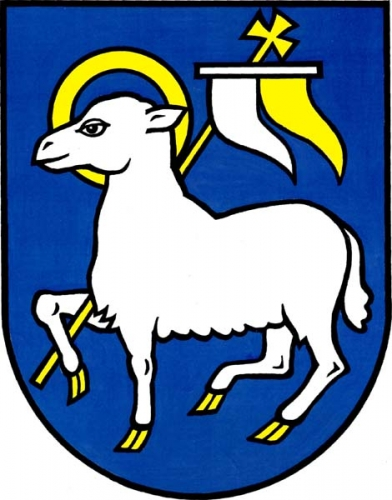
- Flag Coat of arms

- Location in the Czech Republic
- Coordinates: 50°27′42″N 16°11′22″E
- Country: Czech Republic
- Region: Hradec Králové
- District: Náchod
- First mentioned: 1496

Area
  - Total: 7.45 km^{2} (2.88 sq mi)
- Elevation: 360 m (1,180 ft)

Population (2026-01-01)
  - Total: 2,310
  - Density: 310/km^{2} (803/sq mi)
- Time zone: UTC+1 (CET)
  - Summer (DST): UTC+2 (CEST)
- Postal codes: 549 31, 549 32
- Website: www.velkeporici.cz

Velké Poříčí (Czech pronunciation: [ˈvɛlkɛː ˈpor̝iːtʃiː]; German: Groß Poritsch) is a market town in Náchod District in the Hradec Králové Region of the Czech Republic. It has about 2,300 inhabitants.

== Etymology ==
The Czech word poříčí denotes an area "along the river" (podél řeky). The name Velké Poříčí means 'great Poříčí'.

== Geography ==
Velké Poříčí is located about 5 kilometres (3 mi) north of Náchod and 37 km (23 mi) northeast of Hradec Králové, and it briefly borders Poland in the south. It lies in the Orlické Foothills. The highest point is at 490 m (1,608 ft) above sea level. The Metuje River flows through the market town. The market town is urbanistically fused with the town of Hronov.

== History ==
The settlement was most likely founded during the colonisation of the area at the turn of the 13th and 14th centuries. A settlement called Poříčko was documented in 1415, but it is not certain whether Velké Poříčí could be meant by this. The first trustworthy written mention of Velké Poříčí is from 1496. The village was part of the Náchod estate.

At the end of the 19th century, there was a boom in the village, connected with the construction of the railway in 1875 and with the development of the textile industry in the region. In 1908, Velké Poříčí was promoted to a market town.

== Demographics ==
Historical population

Year	Pop.	±%
1869	1,405	—
1880	1,477	+5.1%
1890	1,733	+17.3%
1900	2,168	+25.1%
1910	2,881	+32.9%

Year	Pop.	±%
1921	2,644	−8.2%
1930	2,716	+2.7%
1950	2,398	−11.7%
1961	2,696	+12.4%
1970	2,387	−11.5%

Year	Pop.	±%
1980	2,420	+1.4%
1991	2,361	−2.4%
2001	2,282	−3.3%
2011	2,354	+3.2%
2021	2,196	−6.7%

Source: Censuses

== Transport ==
Velké Poříčí is located on the railway line Broumov–Starkoč.

== Sights ==
There are two protected cultural monuments: a late Baroque sculpture group of the Holy Trinity from 1821 and the Art Nouveau building of the primary school from the beginning of the 20th century.

The main landmark of Velké Poříčí is the Church of the Visitation of the Virgin Mary. It was built in 1906–1910.
