= Water-meadow =

Artificially irrigated meadow

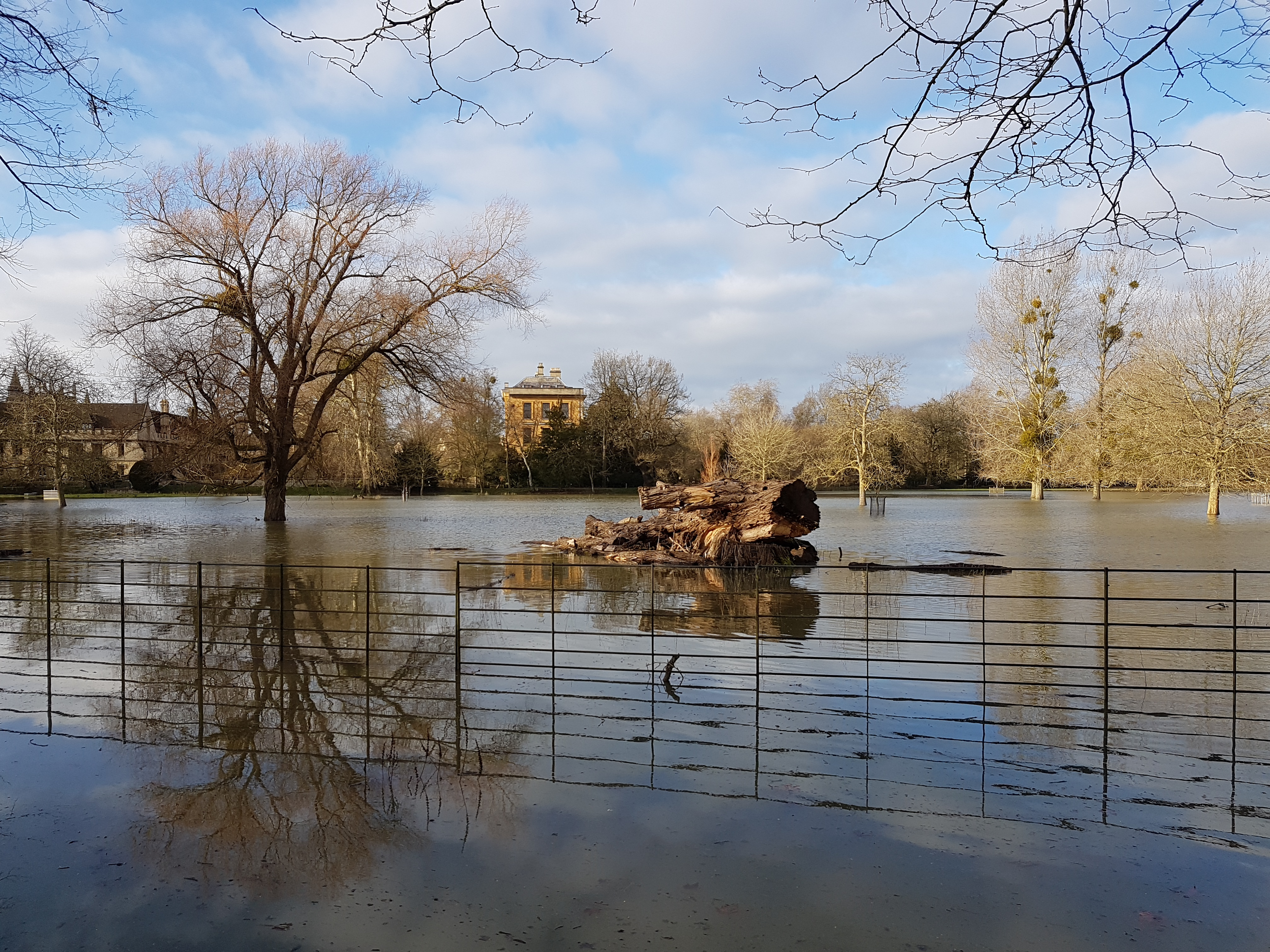
The water meadow at Magdalen College, Oxford, is an island in the River Cherwell

A water-meadow (also water meadow or watermeadow) is an area of grassland subject to controlled irrigation to increase agricultural productivity. Water-meadows were mainly used in Europe from the 16th to the early 20th centuries. Working water-meadows have now largely disappeared, but the field patterns and water channels of derelict water-meadows remain common in areas where they were used, such as parts of Northern Italy, Switzerland and England. Derelict water-meadows are often of importance as wetland wildlife habitats.

Water-meadows should not be confused with flood-meadows, which are naturally covered in shallow water by seasonal flooding from a river. "Water-meadow" is sometimes used more loosely to mean any level grassland beside a river.

== Types ==
Two main types of water-meadow were used.

=== Catchwork water-meadow ===
The simplest form of downward floated water meadow is the catchwork (also known as a 'catch meadow' or 'field gutter' system). Catchworks used spring water or hill-side streams to irrigate valley or hill slopes. If neither of these water sources was available rainwater and farmyard run-off was collected in a specially constructed feeder pond. Water was diverted from the source into a contour-following ditch or 'gutter' which skirted the top of the meadow. When the gutter was blocked by 'stops' of turf, peat or logs, or systems of sluices and boards, water over-flowed down the hillside and irrigated the area of meadow below it. Further down slope further gutters, parallel to the first, caught the water and redistributed it in a similar manner to lower pastures. The process encouraged an even flow of water down the slope. At the base of the meadow the water was collected and carried away via a drain.

As catchworks used sloping ground and were relatively cheap to construct and operate without employing professional drowners, they had become popular with hill farmers in Devon, Somerset and the Welsh Marches by the mid-18th century. The improvements catchworks made to hill pastures were dramatic. They transported lime and animal dung to pastures by 'flush' irrigation episodes, treating the grass sward with suspended nutrients – a process known as 'washing in', whereby dung and lime was mixed into the water. The flow of water also improved the soil through oxygenation and broadleaved grasses flourished at the expense of coarser species. A late form of catchwork, widespread in Britain from the mid-18th century, was sewage irrigation, in which urban sewage was passed along drains to catchwork systems or carted to farms and mixed with head main water.

=== Bedwork water-meadow ===
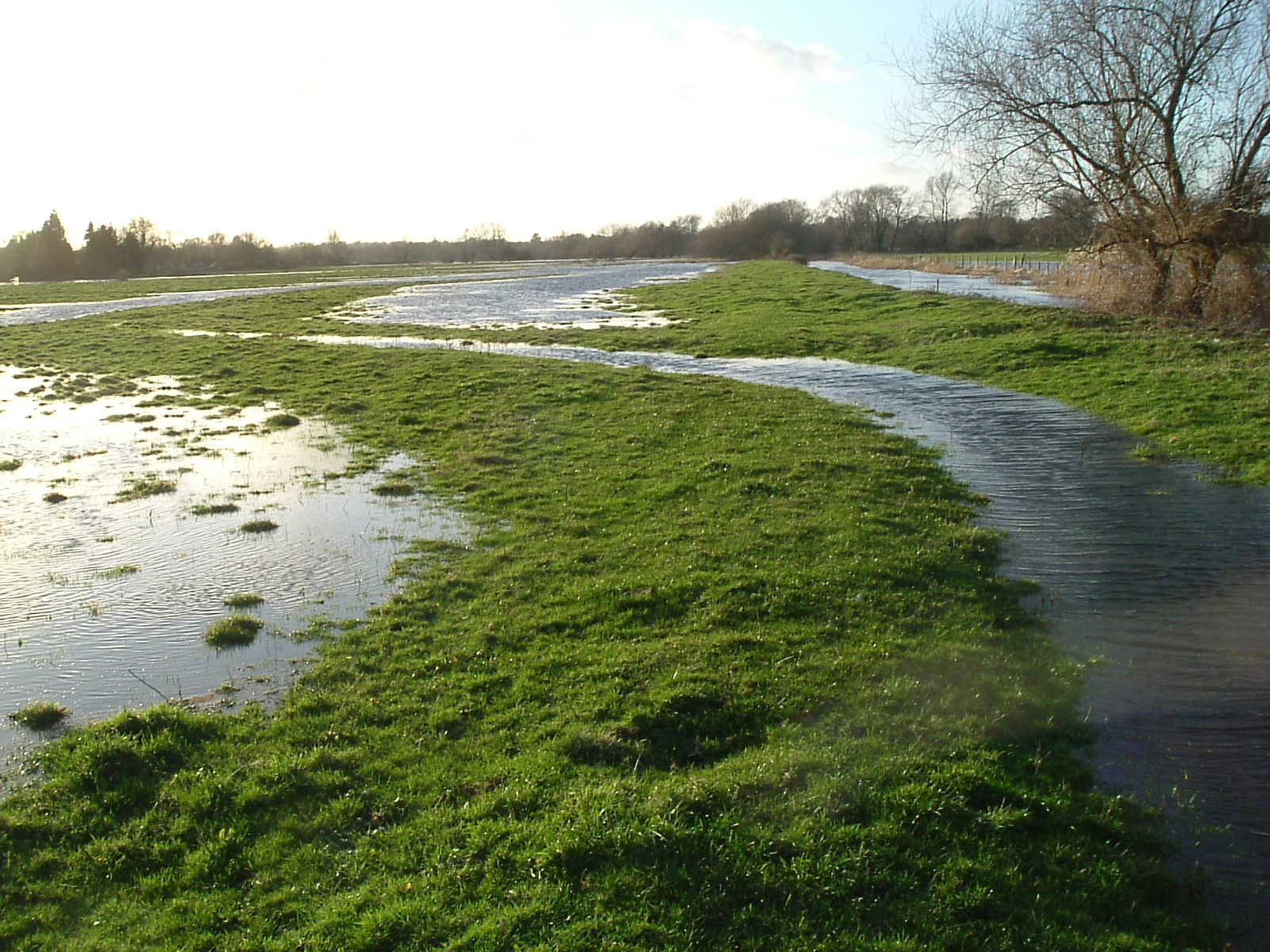
Flooded derelict bedwork water-meadow at Fordingbridge, Hampshire, England. Winter flooding has filled an old carrier channel along the crest of a ridge (running from right foreground to middle distance), and has also flooded the drainage channels (on left and into distance, where they join the river). In use, water would have seeped from the carrier channel on the right, through the grass in the foreground into the drainage channel on the left, which would have looked almost empty.

Bedwork or floated water-meadows were built on almost-level fields along broad river valleys; they required careful construction to ensure correct operation.

A leat, called a main, carrier or top carrier, diverted water from the river and carried it down the valley at a gentler slope than the river, producing a hydrostatic head between the two. Mains were often along the edge of the valley, each main supplying up to about 1 km (0.6 mi) of the valley. The water from the main was used to supply many smaller carriers, on the crests of ridges built across the fields. The channel on the crest of each ridge would overflow slowly down the sides (the panes) of the ridge, the channel eventually tapering to an end at the tip of the ridge. The seeping water would then collect between the ridges, in drains or drawns, these joining to form a bottom carrier or tail drain which returned the water to the river. The ridges and the drains made an interlocking grid (like interlaced fingers), but the ridge-top channels and the drains did not connect directly. A by-carrier took any water not needed for irrigation straight from the main back to the river. The ridges varied in height depending on the available head – usually from around 10 to 50 cm (4 to 20 in). The pattern of carriers and drains was generally regular, but it was adapted to fit the natural topography of the ground and the locations of suitable places for the offtake and return of water.

The water flow was controlled by a system of hatches (sluice gates) and stops (small earth or wooden-board dams). Irrigation could be provided separately for each section of water-meadow. Sometimes aqueducts took carriers over drains, and causeways and culverts provided access for wagons. The working or floating (irrigation) and maintenance of the water-meadow was done by a highly skilled craftsman called a drowner or waterman, who was often employed by several adjacent farmers.

The terminology used for water-meadows varied considerably with locality and dialect.

== Uses ==
Water-meadow irrigation did not aim to flood the ground, but to keep it continuously damp – a working water-meadow has no standing water. Irrigation in early spring kept frosts off the ground and so allowed grass to grow several weeks earlier than otherwise, and in dry summer weather irrigation kept the grass growing. It also allowed the ground to absorb any plant nutrients or silt carried by the river water – this fertilised the grassland, and incidentally also reduced eutrophication of the river water by nutrient pollution. The grass was used both for making hay and for grazing by livestock (usually cattle or sheep).

== Derelict water-meadows ==
Former water-meadows are found along many river valleys, where the sluice gates, channels and field ridges may still be visible (however the ridges should not be confused with ridge and furrow topography, which is found on drier ground and has a very different origin in arable farming). The drains in a derelict water-meadow are generally clogged and wet, and most of the carrier channels are dry, with the smaller ones on the ridge-tops often invisible. If any main carrier channels still flow, they usually connect permanently to the by-carriers. The larger sluices may be concealed under the roots of trees (such as crack willows), which have grown up from seedlings established in the brickwork. The complex mixture of wet and drier ground often gives derelict water-meadows particularly high wetland biodiversity.

== Working water-meadows ==
Derelict water-meadows can be transformed into wildlife protection and conservation areas by repairing and operating the irrigation, as is the case of Josefov Meadows in the Czech Republic. By imitating the natural river flooding which is rare in modern straightened and dammed rivers, a rich biodiversity can be restored and attract and sustain many rare and protected wetland species.

== See also ==
- Berm
- Coastal plain
- Field
- Flooded grasslands and savannas
- Flood-meadow
- Floodplain
- Grassland
- Paddy field
- Pasture
- Plain
- Prairie
- Riparian zone
- Wet meadow
