= Rozkoš Reservoir =

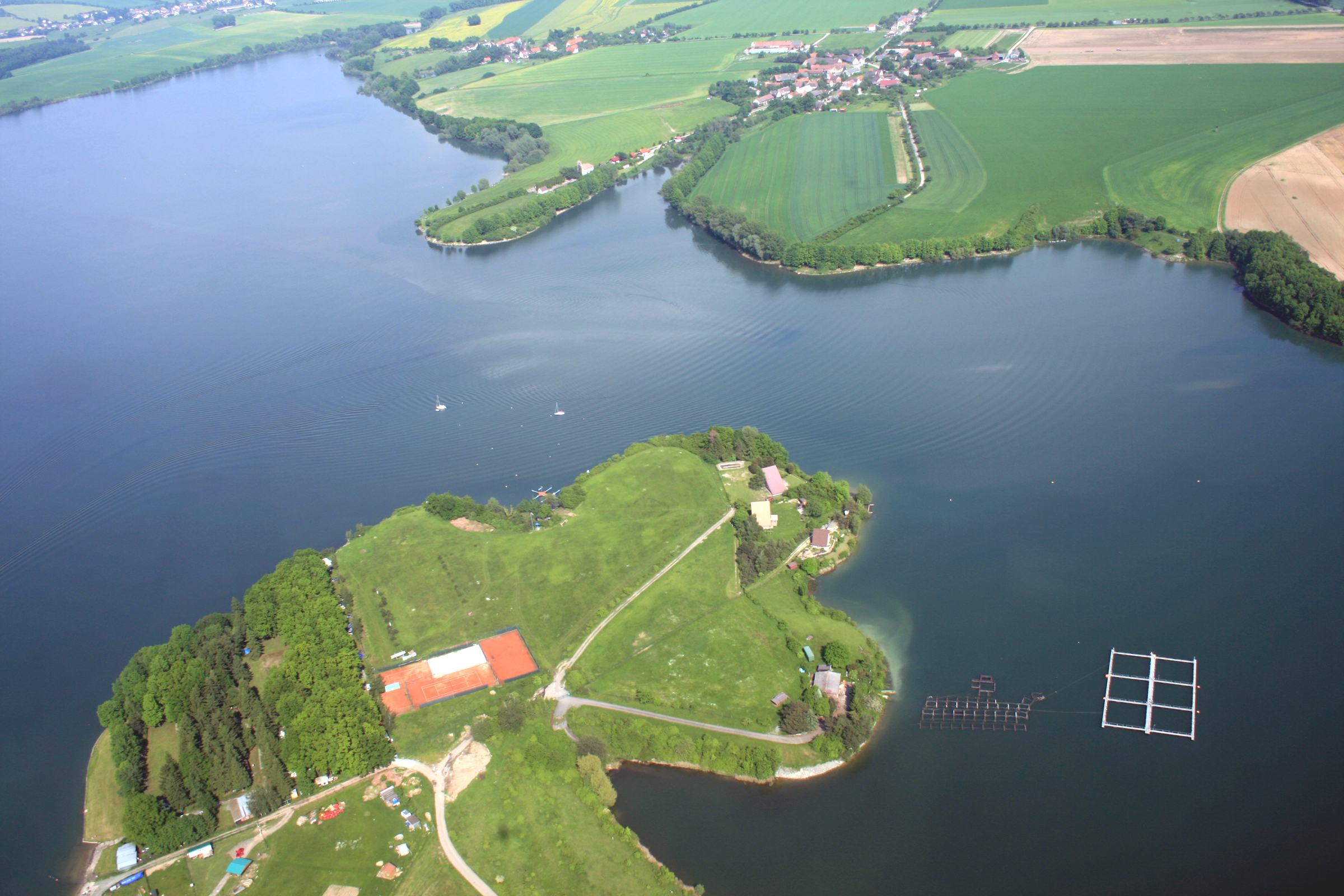
- Aerial view

- Location within Czech Republic
- Coordinates: 50°22′38″N 16°4′11″E
- Type: reservoir
- Primary inflows: Rovenský Stream, Rozkoš Stream, Úpa Canal
- Primary outflows: Rozkoš
- Basin countries: Czech Republic
- Surface area: 10.01 km^{2} (3.86 sq mi)
- Water volume: 76,327,000 m^{3} (61,879 acre⋅ft)
- Surface elevation: 276 m (906 ft)

Rozkoš Reservoir (Czech: vodní nádrž Rozkoš) is a reservoir in the Hradec Králové Region of the Czech Republic. With an area of 10.01 km^{2} (3.86 sq mi), it is the eighth largest reservoir in the country.

== Location ==
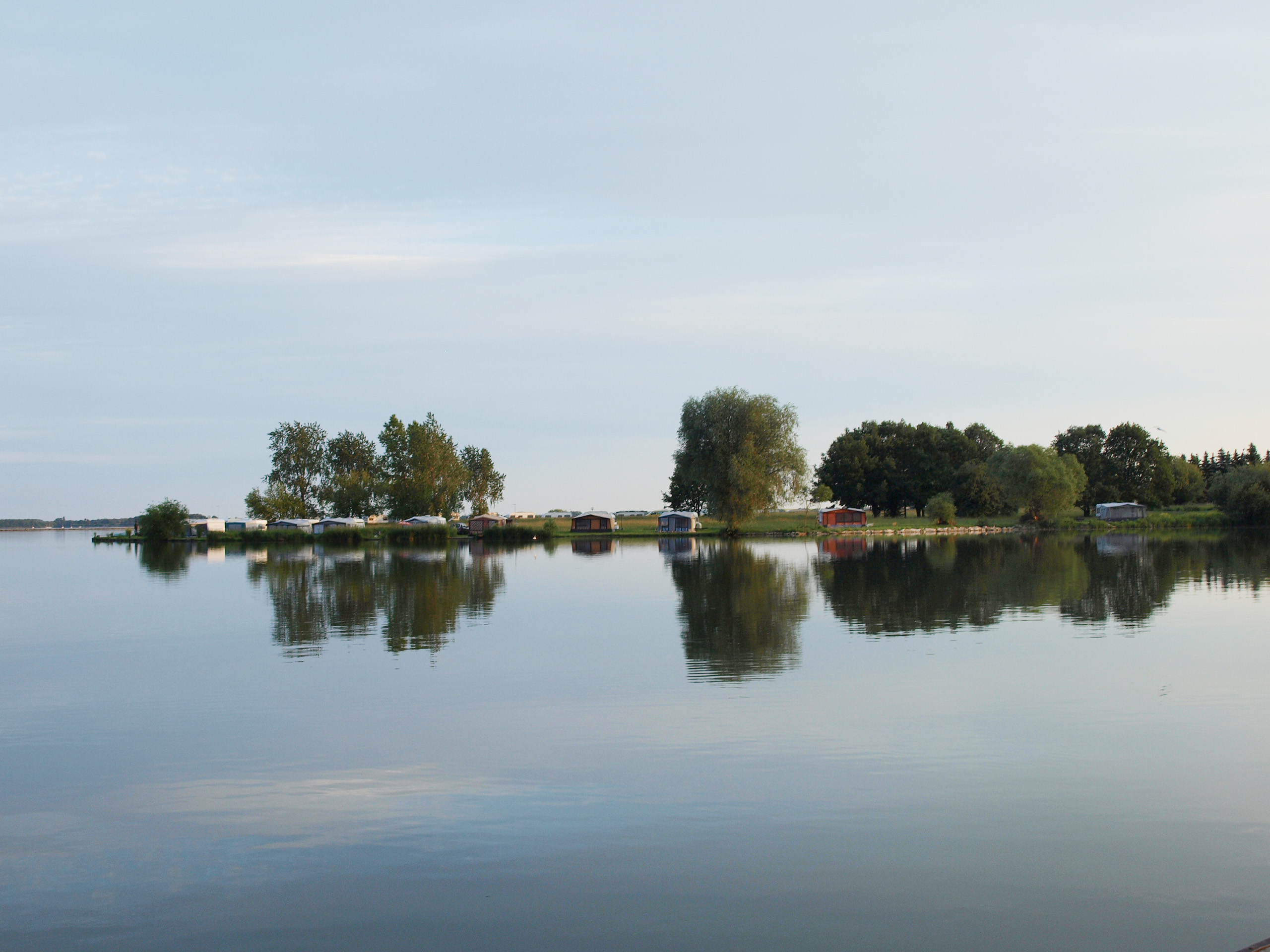
View from Česká Skalice

Rozkoš is located in the Hradec Králové Region and is the largest body of water in the region. It is nicknamed "East Bohemian Sea". The town of Česká Skalice is situated on its shore. Apart from Česká Skalice, the reservoir also extends into the municipal territories of Velká Jesenice, Provodov-Šonov and Nahořany. From the geomorphological point of view, Rozkoš lies in the Orlice Table.

== Characteristic ==
The reservoir is fed by the streams Rovenský and Rozkoš, and by a 2.337 km (1.452 mi) long canal from the Úpa River. It has an area of the water surface of 8.88 km^{2} (3.43 sq mi) and total capacity of 76,327,000 m^{3} (61,879 acre⋅ft).

== History ==
The construction of the reservoir near Česká Skalice was considered as early as 1923. In 1939, a general project was drawn up, according to which preparations took place in the years 1946–1950. The building of the reservoir dam began in 1951, however after one year of construction, further works were halted. The construction of the dam was resumed in 1965 and completed in 1972. Permission for permanent operation was granted by the Ministry of Forestry and Water Management on 1 January 1976.

== Purpose ==
Rozkoš serves as flood protection of the lower course of the Úpa and Metuje rivers and as a retention basin, and is also used for summer recreation, water sports and breeding of fish. A small hydroelectric power plant with installed capacity 675 kW is located on the main dam. The reservoir is also an important ornithological site with more than 270 species of birds, of which more than 120 species nest here.

Near Česká Skalice is located Campsite Rozkoš.
