= Jívka =

- Municipality
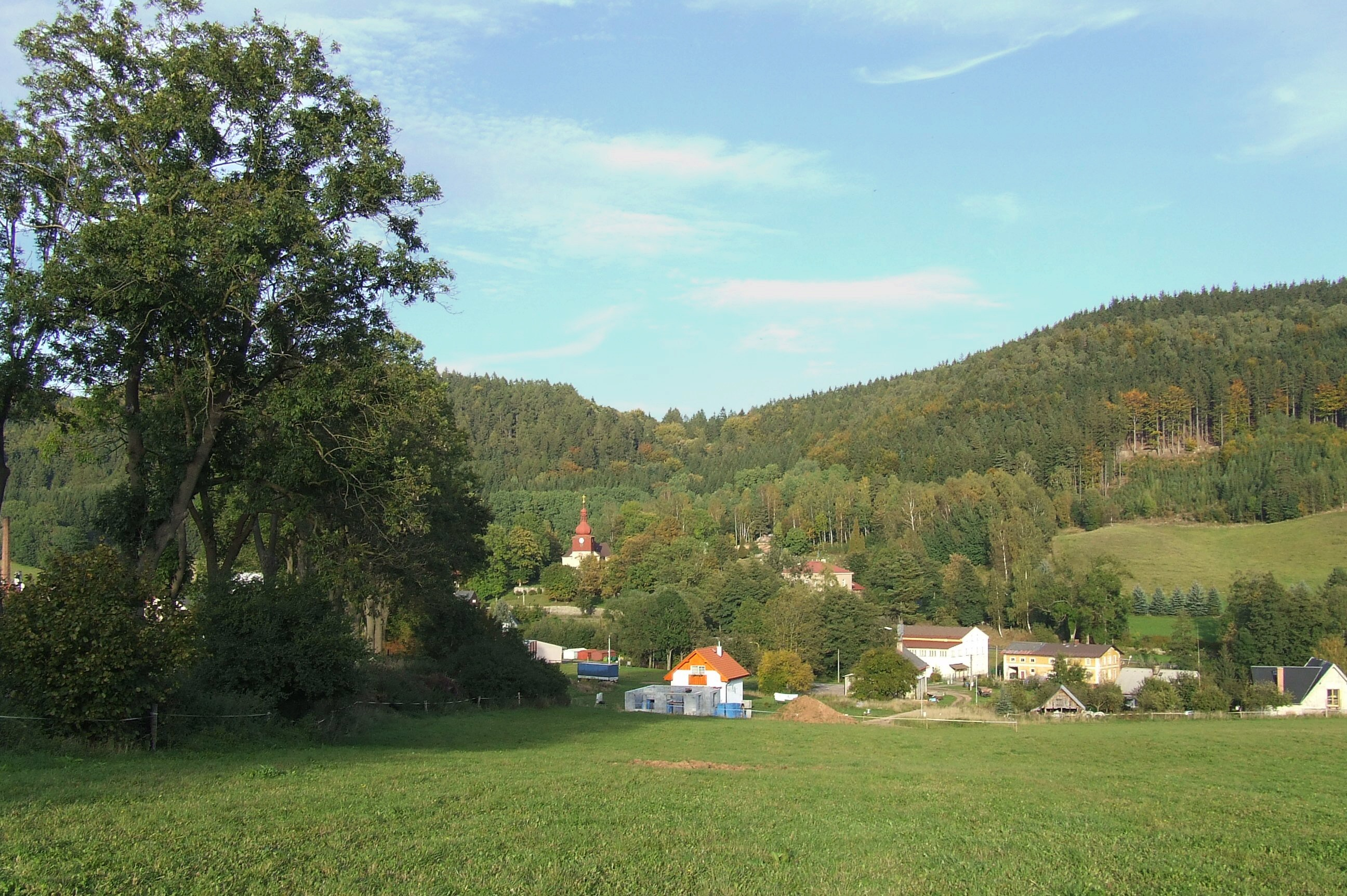
- Horní Vernéřovice, a locality in Jívka

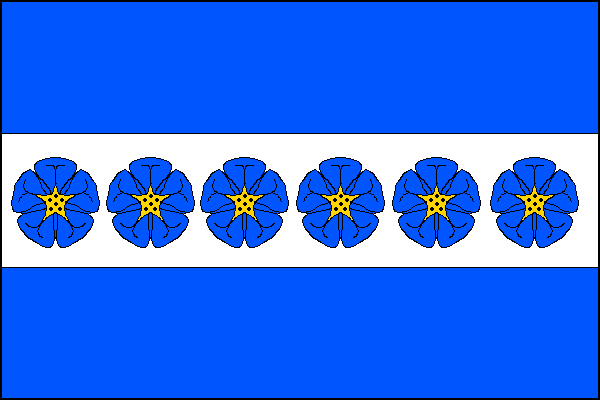
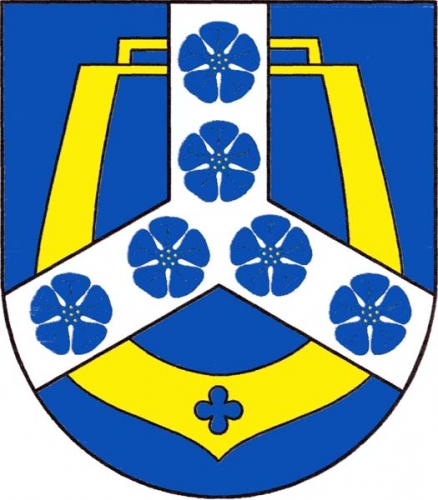
- Flag Coat of arms

- Location in the Czech Republic
- Coordinates: 50°32′6″N 16°6′33″E
- Country: Czech Republic
- Region: Hradec Králové
- District: Trutnov
- First mentioned: 1356

Area
  - Total: 32.00 km^{2} (12.36 sq mi)
- Elevation: 474 m (1,555 ft)

Population (2026-01-01)
  - Total: 605
  - Density: 18.9/km^{2} (49.0/sq mi)
- Time zone: UTC+1 (CET)
  - Summer (DST): UTC+2 (CEST)
- Postal code: 542 13
- Website: www.jivka.cz

Jívka is a municipality and village in Trutnov District in the Hradec Králové Region of the Czech Republic. It has about 600 inhabitants. A locality in Jívka called Dolní Vernéřovice has well preserved folk architecture and is protected as a village monument zone. The Metuje River originates in the northern part of the municipal territory.

== Demographics ==
Historical population
Year	Pop.	±%
1869	3,670	—
1880	3,202	−12.8%
1890	2,952	−7.8%
1900	2,737	−7.3%
1910	2,343	−14.4%
1921	2,164	−7.6%
1930	2,128	−1.7%
1950	1,136	−46.6%
1961	1,097	−3.4%
1970	843	−23.2%
1980	786	−6.8%
1991	632	−19.6%
2001	578	−8.5%
2011	552	−4.5%
2021	535	−3.1%
Source: Censuses
