= Klikawa (stream) =

Klikawa Střela
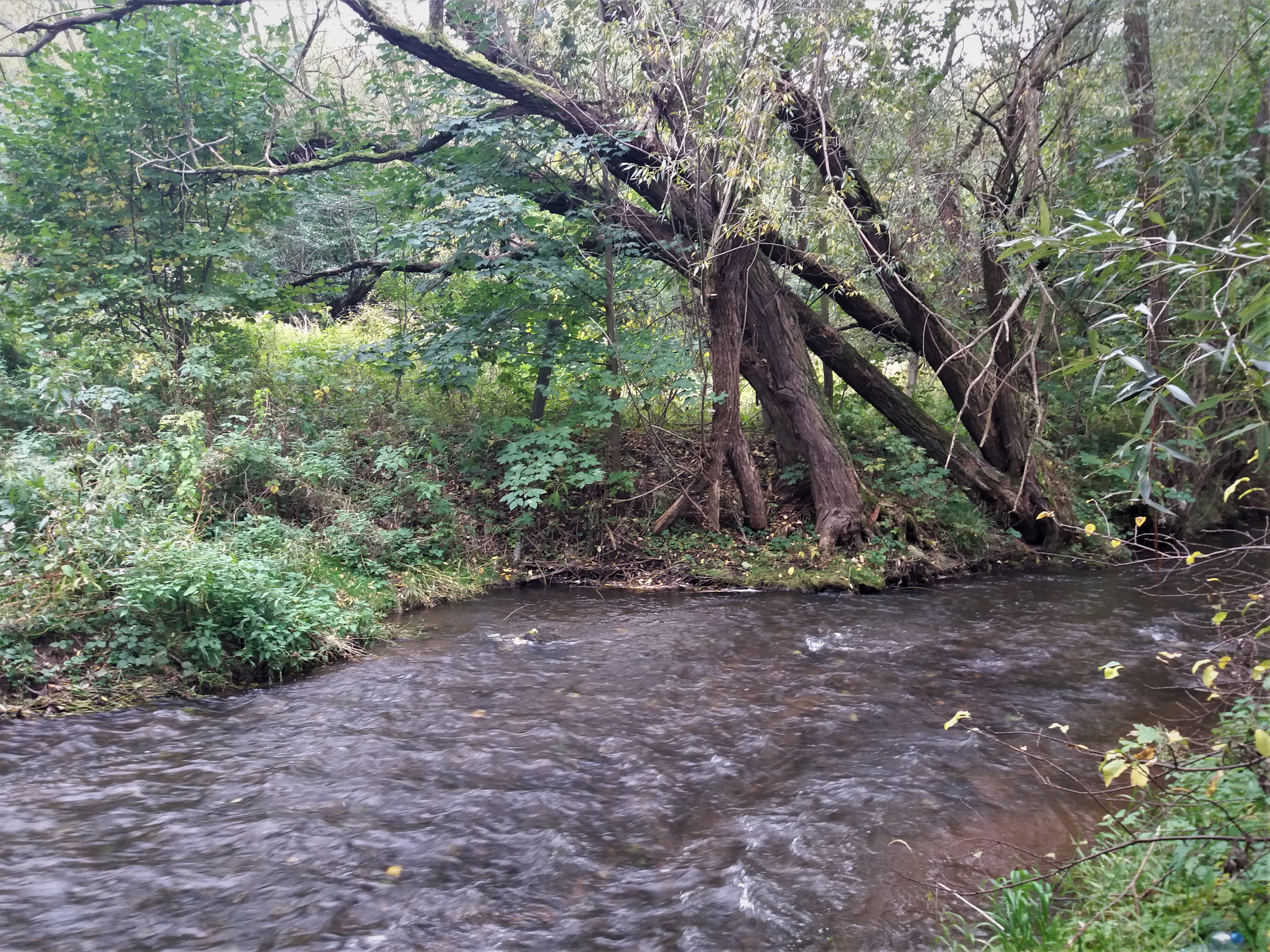
- The Klikawa on the Czech–Polish border

Location
- Countries: Poland; Czech Republic
- Voivodeships/ Regions: Lower Silesian; Hradec Králové

Physical characteristics
- Source
  - location: Zimne Wody, Orlické Mountains
  - elevation: 740 m (2,430 ft)
- Mouth
  - location: Metuje
  - coordinates: 50°25′54″N 16°11′43″E
  - elevation: 347 m (1,138 ft)
- Length: 15.1 km (9.4 mi)
- Basin size: 69.1 km^{2} (26.7 sq mi)
- Discharge
  - average: 0.70 m^{3}/s (25 cu ft/s) on the Czech–Polish border

Basin features
- Progression: Metuje→ Elbe→ North Sea

The Klikawa (Czech: Střela) is a stream in Poland and the Czech Republic, a tributary of the Metuje near Náchod. It flows through Lewin Kłodzki and Kudowa-Zdrój. It is 15.1 km (9.4 mi) long, of which 0.4 km (0.25 mi) forms the Czech–Polish state border and 0.1 km (0.062 mi) flows exclusively in the Czech Republic. Its left tributary is the Jaworniczka stream and its right tributary is the Wyżnik stream.
