= Jaroměř =

- Town
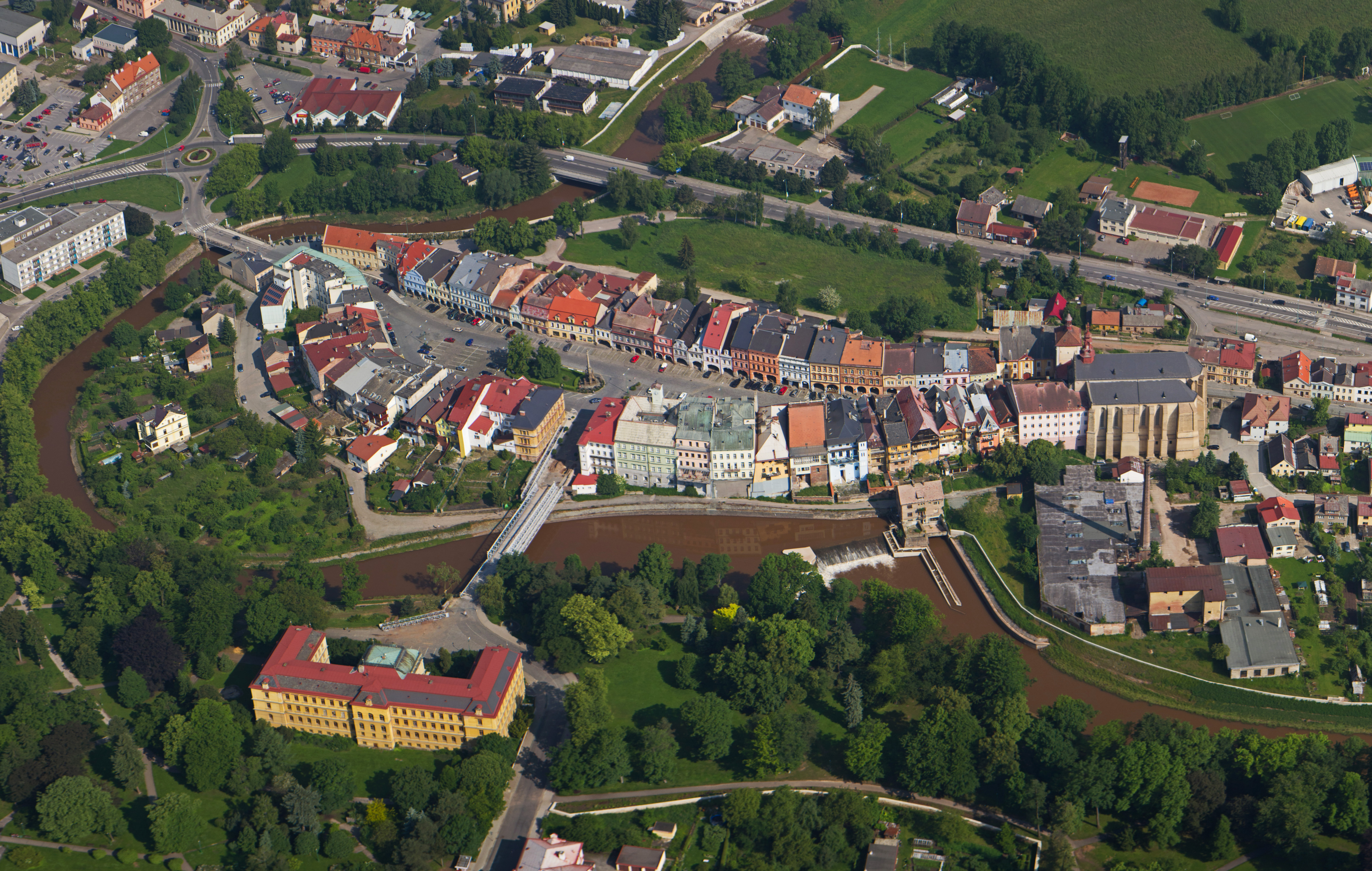
- Aerial view of the centre of Jaroměř

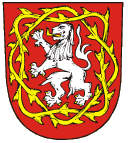
- Flag Coat of arms

- Location in the Czech Republic
- Coordinates: 50°21′1″N 15°55′6″E
- Country: Czech Republic
- Region: Hradec Králové
- District: Náchod
- First mentioned: 1126

Government
  - Mayor: Jan Borůvka

Area
  - Total: 23.95 km^{2} (9.25 sq mi)
- Elevation: 254 m (833 ft)

Population (2026-01-01)
  - Total: 12,487
  - Density: 521.4/km^{2} (1,350/sq mi)
- Time zone: UTC+1 (CET)
  - Summer (DST): UTC+2 (CEST)
- Postal codes: 551 01, 551 02
- Website: www.jaromer-josefov.cz

Jaroměř (Czech pronunciation: [ˈjaromɲɛr̝̊]; German: Jermer) is a town in Náchod District in the Hradec Králové Region of the Czech Republic. It has about 12,000 inhabitants. The town is located in the East Elbe Table, at the confluence of the rivers Elbe, Úpa and Metuje.

Jaroměř is known for the Josefov Fortress. The Josefov part of Jaroměř is well preserved and is protected as an urban monument reservation, and the historic town centre of Jaroměř is protected as an urban monument zone.

== Administrative division ==
Jaroměř consists of nine municipal parts (in brackets population according to the 2021 census):

- Jaroměř (423)
- Cihelny (624)
- Jakubské Předměstí (1,857)
- Josefov (2,443)
- Pražské Předměstí (5,932)
- Dolní Dolce (4)
- Jezbiny (249)
- Semonice (283)
- Starý Ples (165)

== Etymology ==
Jaroměř was named after Jaromír, Duke of Bohemia. The initial name was Jaromiř, meaning "Jaromír's (fortress)".

== Geography ==
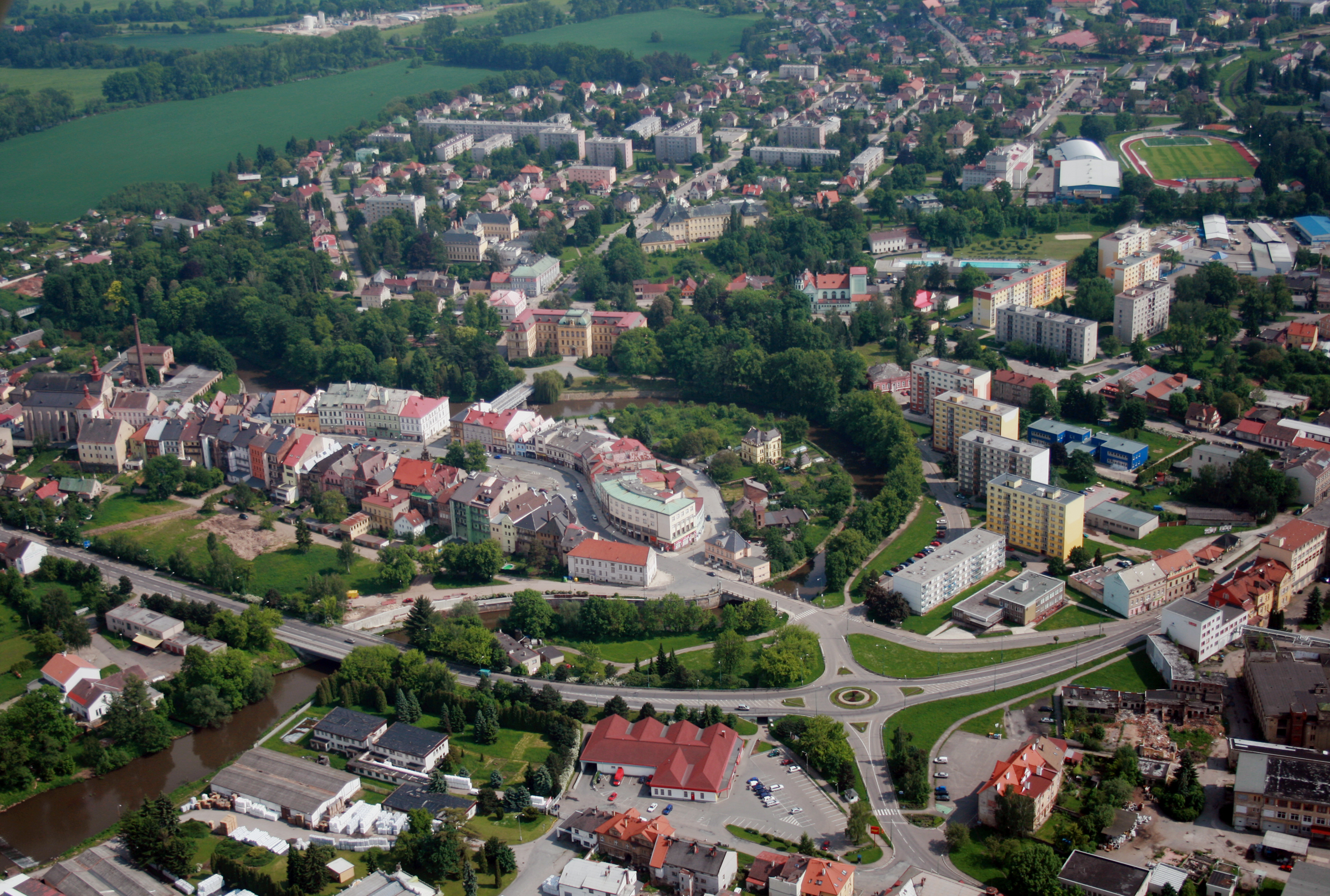
Aerial view of the town centre

Jaroměř is located about 18 kilometres (11 mi) west of Náchod and 16 km (10 mi) northeast of Hradec Králové. It lies mostly in a flat agricultural landscape in the East Elbe Table. The eastern tip of the municipal territory extends into the Orlice Table. The highest point is at 291 m (955 ft) above sea level.

The town lies at the confluence of the rivers Elbe, Úpa and Metuje. There is also the confluence of the Metuje and Stará Metuje, which flows through the eastern part of the territory. There are several fishponds in the municipal territory, the largest of which is Jaroměřský rybník in the northern part.

In the area between the Metuje and Stará Metuje rivers is the Josefov Meadows Bird Reserve. It is home to many rare and endangered species of birds and amphibians thanks to its returning wetlands ecosystem.

== History ==
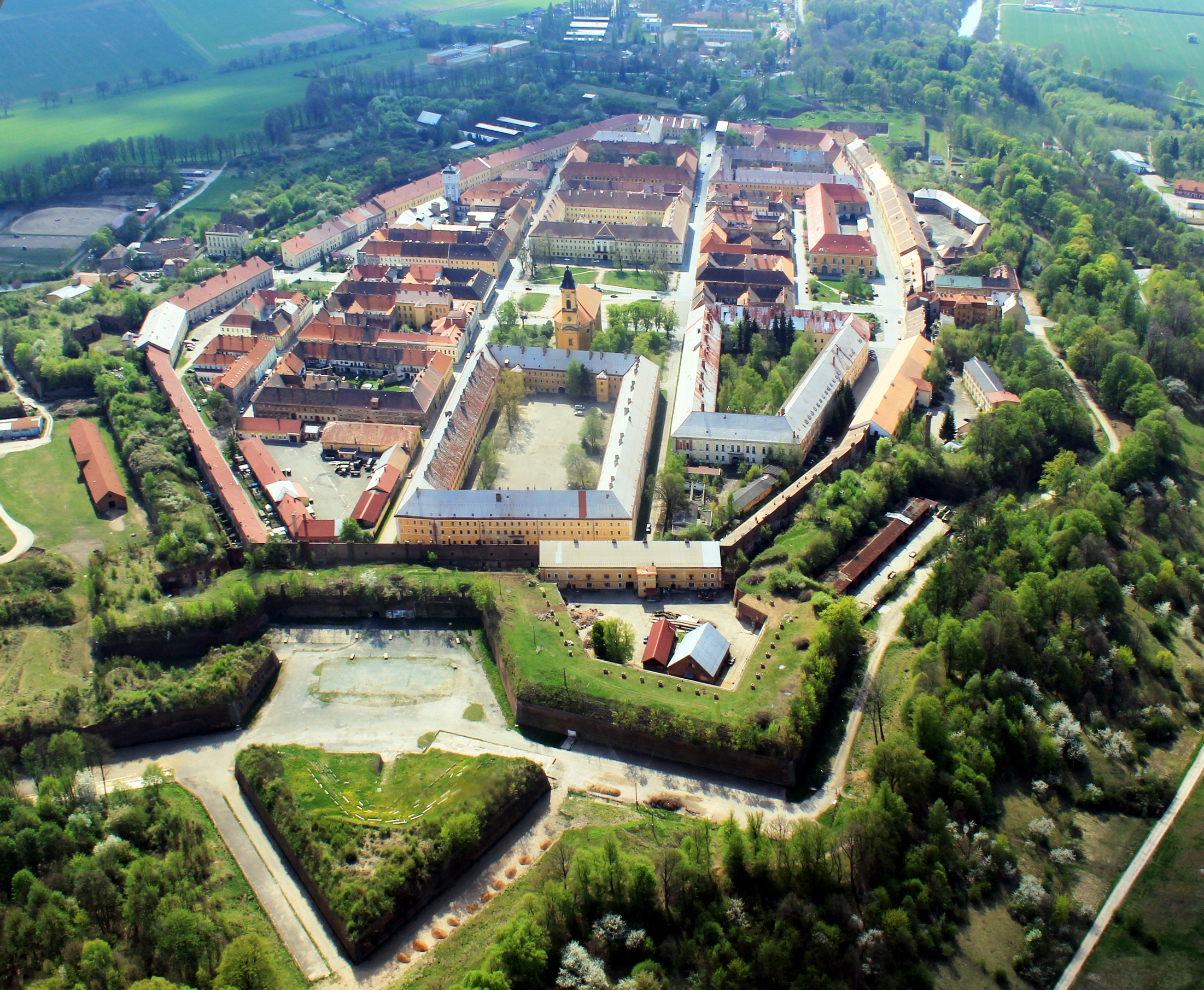
Josefov

The area around the local rivers was populated as early as 40,000 BC. The first written mention of Jaroměř is from 1126, when a fortress founded by Duke Jaromír is documented in the area of today's Church of Saint Nicholas. The village was probably promoted to a royal town by King Ottokar I of Bohemia and first referred to as a town in 1298. In 1307, it became a dowry town administered by Queen Elizabeth Richeza.

During the Hussite Wars, the town surrounded to Hussites. In 1437, it became a dowry town of Queen Barbara of Cilli, but the citizens did not want to give up its privileges and submit to the Queen. Barbara pledged the town to King George of Poděbrady in 1445. At the end of the 15th century, the town was badly damaged by a fire. After it recovered, it suffered during the Thirty Years' War. Despite the war, several Renaissance and Baroque monuments were created here at this time. In 1791, Jaroměř became again a royal town.

From 1780 to 1787, Emperor Joseph II had built the imperial fortress Ples on the left bank of the Elbe and Metuje rivers to prevent the threat of a Prussian invasion. Later this conurbation took the name of Josefstadt (Josefov in Czech, literally 'Joseph's town'). The fortress was never attacked and was closed in 1888.

In the 19th century, industry and business developed in Jaroměř. The railway was built in 1857.

In 1948, the town of Josefov and the villages of Dolní Dolce and Jezbiny were incorporated into Jaroměř.

== Demographics ==
Historical population

Year	Pop.	±%
1869	8,653	—
1880	13,257	+53.2%
1890	13,805	+4.1%
1900	14,050	+1.8%
1910	14,992	+6.7%

Year	Pop.	±%
1921	14,936	−0.4%
1930	17,243	+15.4%
1950	12,531	−27.3%
1961	12,396	−1.1%
1970	11,974	−3.4%

Year	Pop.	±%
1980	12,046	+0.6%
1991	12,557	+4.2%
2001	12,921	+2.9%
2011	12,353	−4.4%
2021	11,980	−3.0%

Source: Censuses

== Economy ==
There are no major companies. The largest employers are the companies of Gumotex Automotive Jaroměř and Karsit, both manufacturers of automotive parts and both employing more than 250 people.

== Transport ==
The D11 motorway runs west of the town.

Jaroměř lies on the interregional railway lines Prague–Trutnov and Liberec–Pardubice. In addition, the town lies on the line from Hradec Králové to Svoboda nad Úpou.

== Culture ==
Each summer, the town hosts the four-day Brutal Assault, the biggest central European extreme metal music festival. Over 10,000 metalheads from all over Europe attends the festival.

== Sights ==
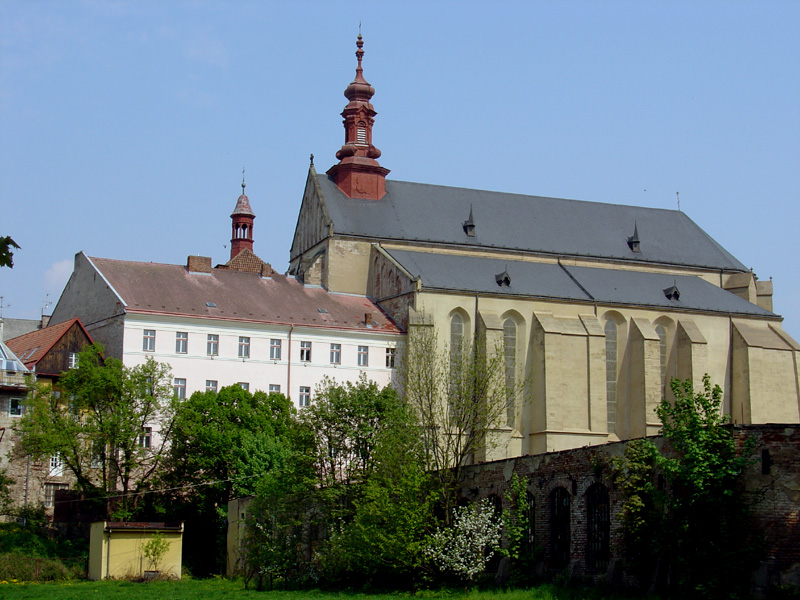
Church of Saint Nicholas with the rectory

Jaroměř is best known for the Josefov Fortress. The fortress with the underground system is accessible and is one of the main tourist destinations of the region. In Josefov is also the Church of the Ascension of the Virgin Mary. It was built in the Empire style in 1805–1811.

The historic centre of Jaroměř is located around the meander of the Elbe. On the square there is a Marian column designed by Matthias Braun from 1723–1727. The eastern side of the square is closed by the a town gate with bell tower, the last preserved element of town fortification, and by the Church of Saint Nicholas. It was built in the early 14th century. The church is one of the most significant church buildings of the High Czech Gothic and it used to be part of the fortification. Next to the church is the Baroque building of the rectory from 1786.

Near the village of Semonice is a conciliation cross. With a height of 1.67 m (5 ft 6 in), it is considered the largest in the Czech Republic.

== Notable people ==
- Géza Fejérváry (1833–1914), Hungarian general
- Otakar Španiel (1881–1955), sculptor and engraver
- Josef Šíma (1891–1971), painter
- Zdeněk Veselovský (1928–2006), zoologist
- Antonín Švorc (1934–2011), operatic bass-baritone
- Ivo Pešák (1944–2011), singer and comic performer
- Jiří Novák (born 1950), ice hockey player
- Otto Dlabola (born 1973), pair skater
- Andrea Kalousová (born 1996), model

== Twin towns – sister cities ==
Jaroměř is twinned with:

- Warrington, England, United Kingdom
- Ziębice, Poland
