= Provodov-Šonov =

- Municipality
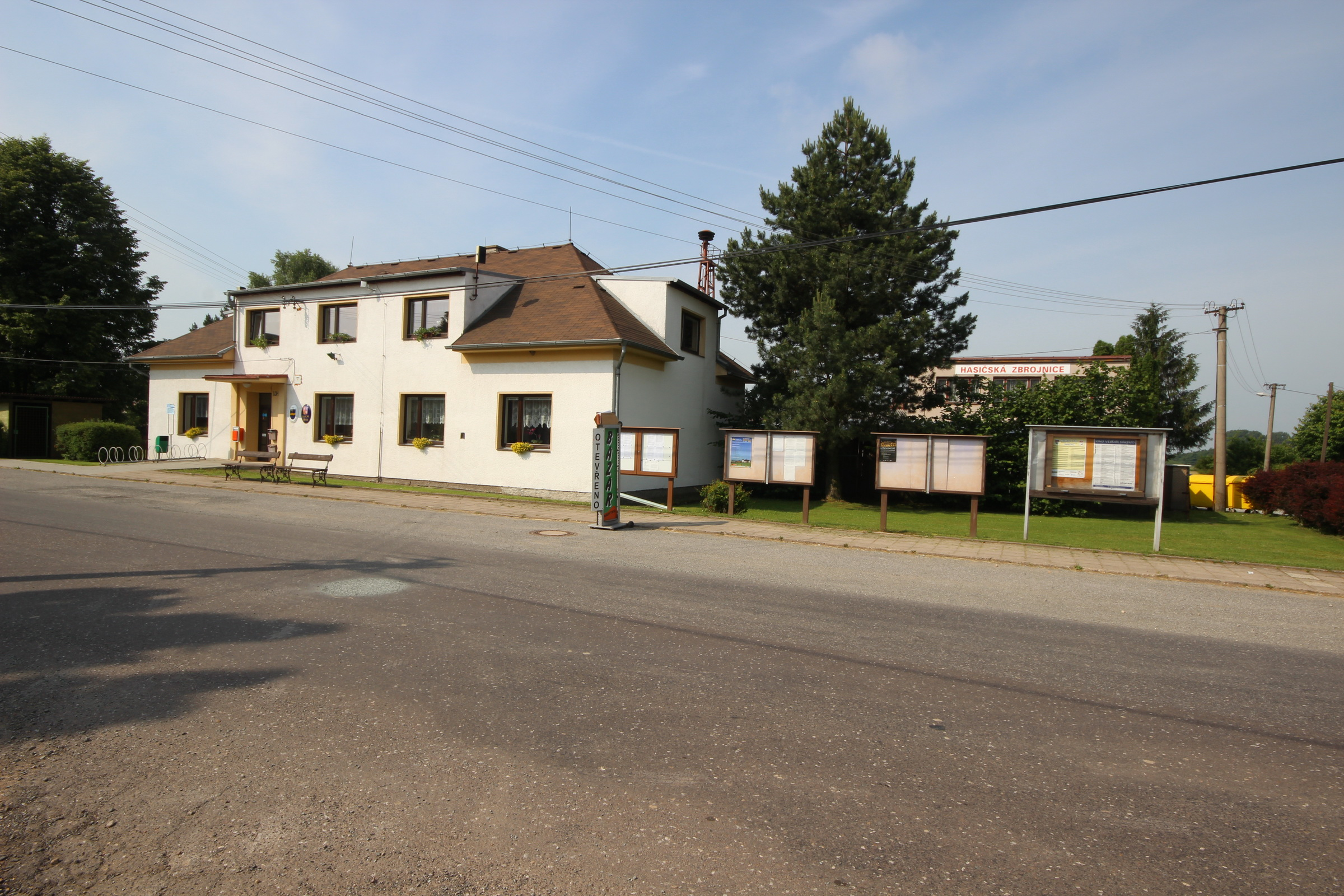
- Municipal office

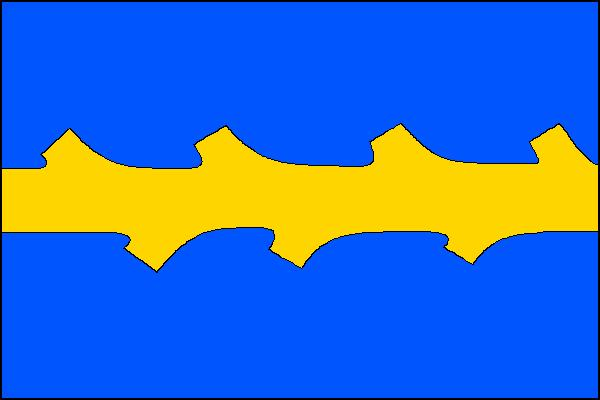
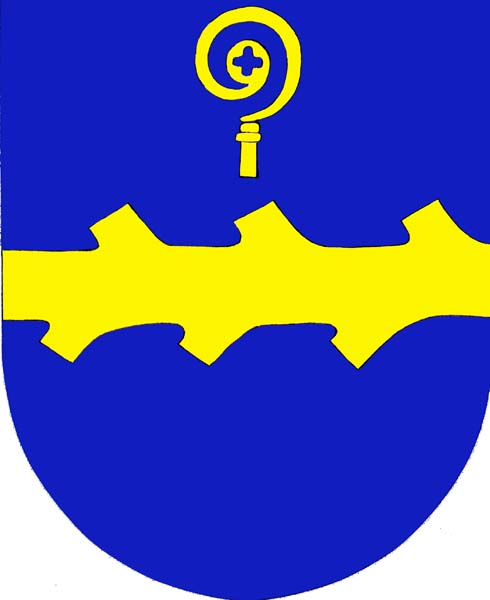
- Flag Coat of arms

- Location in the Czech Republic
- Coordinates: 50°23′14″N 16°6′29″E
- Country: Czech Republic
- Region: Hradec Králové
- District: Náchod
- First mentioned: 1213

Area
  - Total: 16.18 km^{2} (6.25 sq mi)
- Elevation: 297 m (974 ft)

Population (2026-01-01)
  - Total: 1,211
  - Density: 74.85/km^{2} (193.8/sq mi)
- Time zone: UTC+1 (CET)
  - Summer (DST): UTC+2 (CEST)
- Postal code: 549 08
- Website: www.provodovsonov.cz

Provodov-Šonov is a municipality in Náchod District in the Hradec Králové Region of the Czech Republic. It has about 1,200 inhabitants. Part of Rozkoš Reservoir lies in the municipality.

== Administrative division ==
Provodov-Šonov consists of five municipal parts (in brackets population according to the 2021 census):

- Provodov (356)
- Šonov u Nového Města nad Metují (591)
- Kleny (140)
- Šeřeč (29)
- Václavice (76)

== Demographics ==
Historical population
Year	Pop.	±%
1869	1,284	—
1880	1,376	+7.2%
1890	1,398	+1.6%
1900	1,384	−1.0%
1910	1,396	+0.9%
1921	1,288	−7.7%
1930	1,261	−2.1%
1950	1,016	−19.4%
1961	971	−4.4%
1970	945	−2.7%
1980	920	−2.6%
1991	1,000	+8.7%
2001	1,029	+2.9%
2011	1,145	+11.3%
2021	1,192	+4.1%
Source: Censuses
