= Jestřebí (Náchod District) =

- Municipality
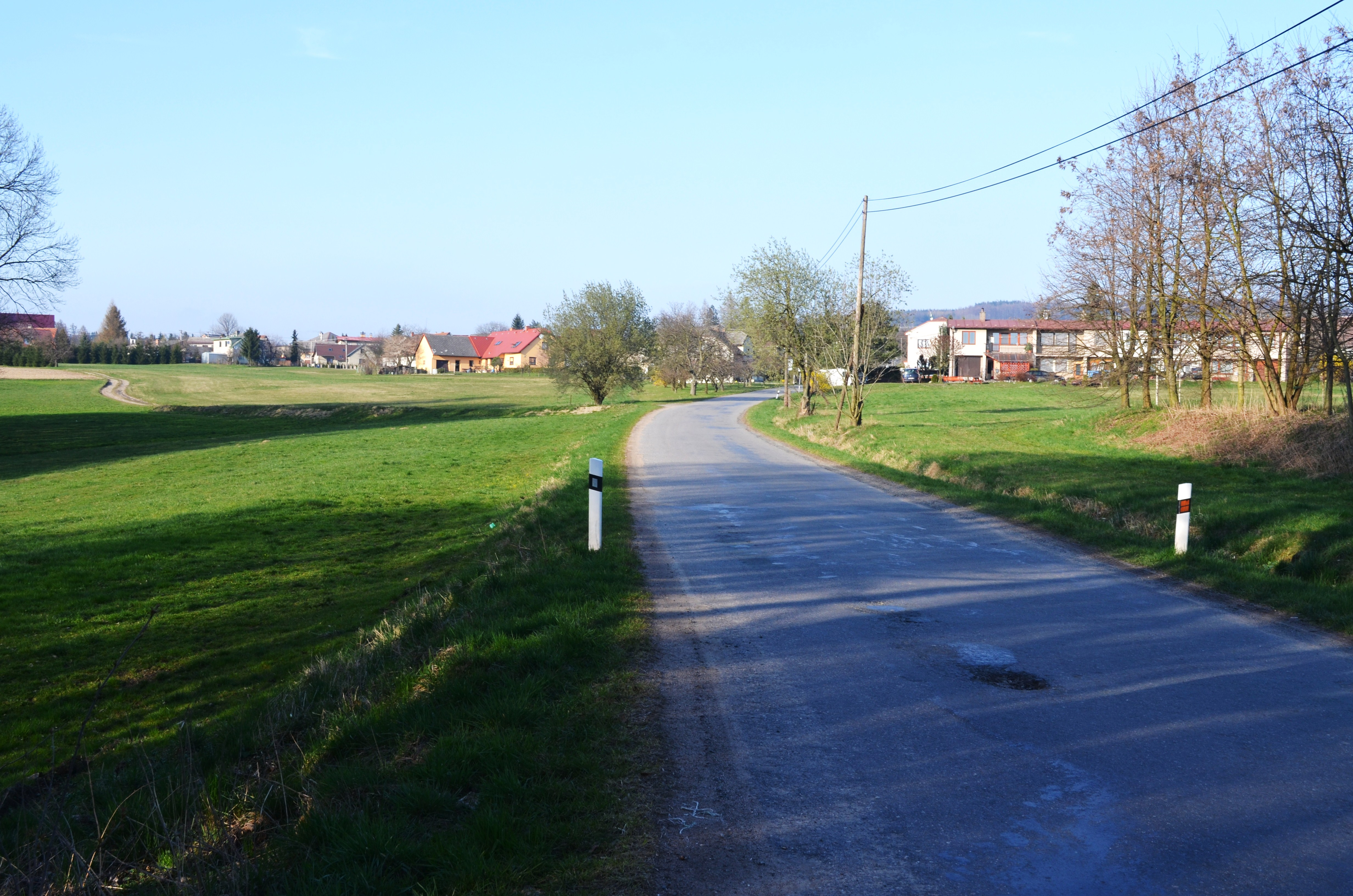
- View from the southwest

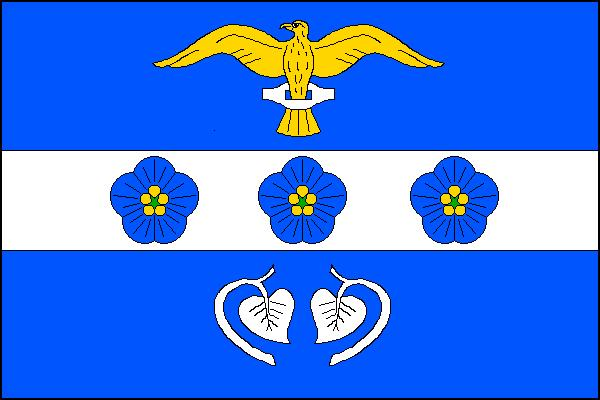
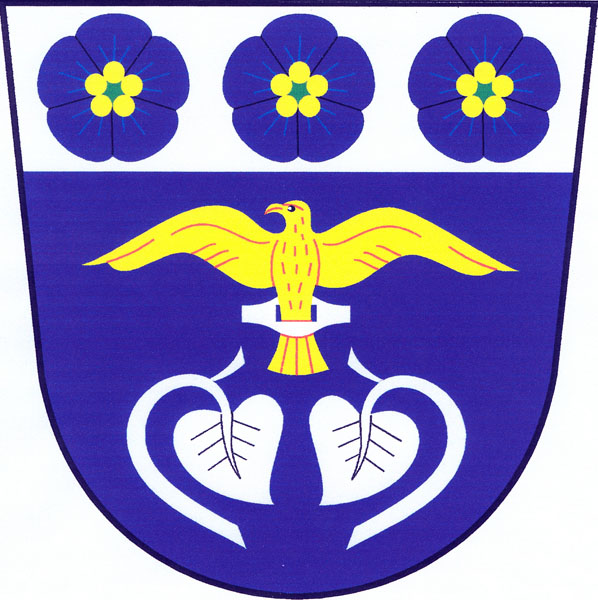
- Flag Coat of arms

- Location in the Czech Republic
- Coordinates: 50°21′44″N 16°10′56″E
- Country: Czech Republic
- Region: Hradec Králové
- District: Náchod
- First mentioned: 1459

Area
  - Total: 4.30 km^{2} (1.66 sq mi)
- Elevation: 448 m (1,470 ft)

Population (2026-01-01)
  - Total: 173
  - Density: 40.2/km^{2} (104/sq mi)
- Time zone: UTC+1 (CET)
  - Summer (DST): UTC+2 (CEST)
- Postal code: 549 01
- Website: www.jestrebinadmetuji.cz

Jestřebí (German: Habichtsau) is a municipality and village in Náchod District in the Hradec Králové Region of the Czech Republic. It has about 200 inhabitants. It lies in the valley of the Metuje River.

== Demographics ==
Historical population
Year	Pop.	±%
1869	222	—
1880	209	−5.9%
1890	194	−7.2%
1900	197	+1.5%
1910	204	+3.6%
1921	198	−2.9%
1930	175	−11.6%
1950	130	−25.7%
1961	161	+23.8%
1970	163	+1.2%
1980	189	+16.0%
1991	175	−7.4%
2001	169	−3.4%
2011	151	−10.7%
2021	132	−12.6%
Source: Censuses
