= Přibyslav (Náchod District) =

- Municipality
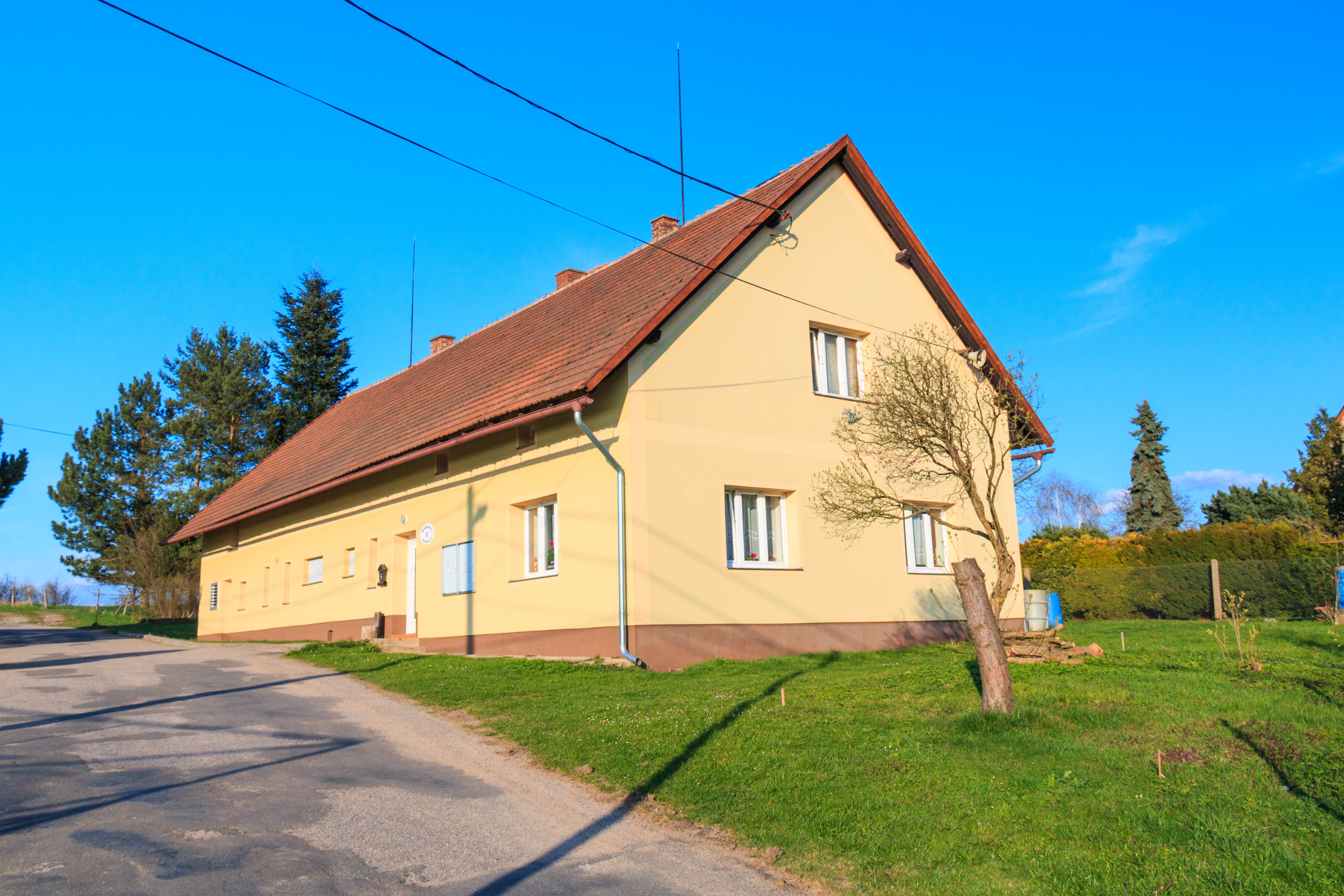
- Municipal office

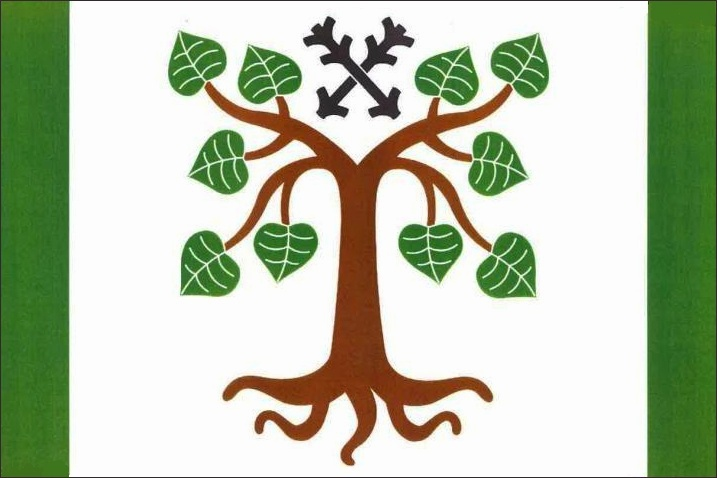
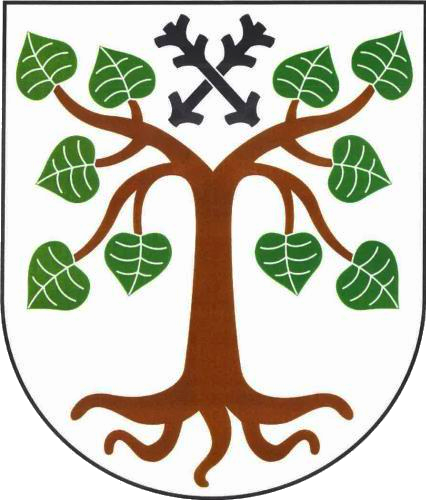
- Flag Coat of arms

- Location in the Czech Republic
- Coordinates: 50°22′25″N 16°10′7″E
- Country: Czech Republic
- Region: Hradec Králové
- District: Náchod
- First mentioned: 1358

Area
  - Total: 3.50 km^{2} (1.35 sq mi)
- Elevation: 367 m (1,204 ft)

Population (2026-01-01)
  - Total: 199
  - Density: 56.9/km^{2} (147/sq mi)
- Time zone: UTC+1 (CET)
  - Summer (DST): UTC+2 (CEST)
- Postal code: 549 01
- Website: www.obecpribyslav.cz

Přibyslav (German: Prenzlau) is a municipality and village in Náchod District in the Hradec Králové Region of the Czech Republic. It has about 200 inhabitants.

== Demographics ==
Historical population
Year	Pop.	±%
1869	230	—
1880	223	−3.0%
1890	262	+17.5%
1900	249	−5.0%
1910	255	+2.4%
1921	213	−16.5%
1930	210	−1.4%
1950	174	−17.1%
1961	167	−4.0%
1970	167	+0.0%
1980	137	−18.0%
1991	139	+1.5%
2001	164	+18.0%
2011	173	+5.5%
2021	185	+6.9%
Source: Censuses
