= Josefov Meadows =

Nature reserve in the Czech Republic

Josefov Meadows Bird Reserve
- Ptačí park Josefovské louky
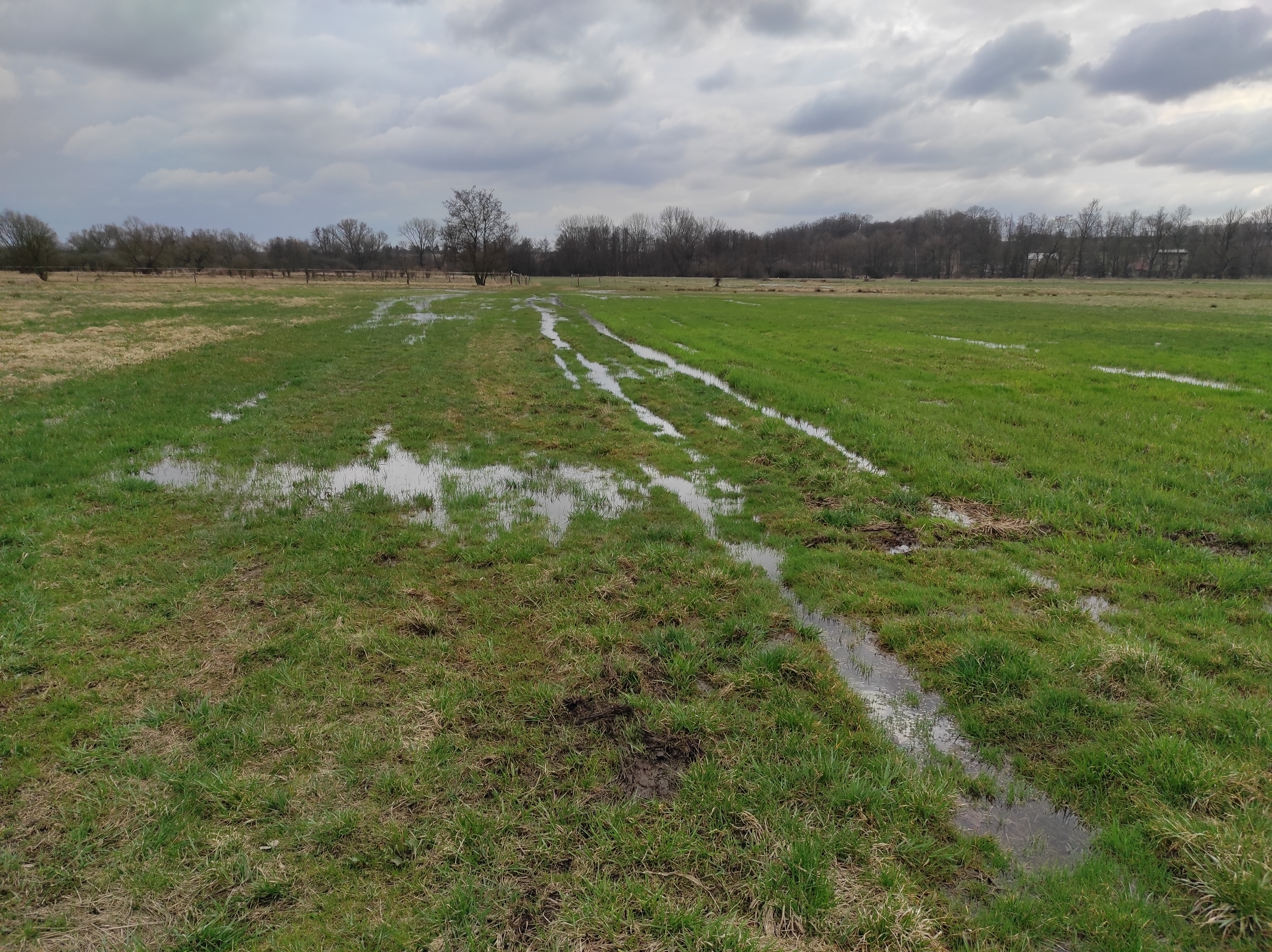

- Location within Czech Republic
- Location: Josefov, Czech Republic
- Nearest town: Jaroměř
- Coordinates: 50°20′40″N 15°56′36″E
- Area: 42 hectares (0.42 km^{2}; 0.16 sq mi)
- Established: 2008
- Owner: Czech Society for Ornithology
- Website: www.birdlife.cz

The Josefov Meadows Bird Reserve (Czech: Ptačí park Josefovské louky) is a privately owned, publicly accessible nature reserve next to Josefov Fortress near Jaroměř in the Hradec Králové Region, Czech Republic. Established in 2008, the area is administered and developed by the Czech Society for Ornithology. The wet meadow is being restored with the aim of creating a reserve for birds, as well as other fauna and flora that thrive in wetlands.

== Restoration of the wet meadows ==
The Czech Society for Ornithology started buying up land in an area next to the river Metuje and restoring and imitating its original appearance and function of a floodplain. Thanks to public donations and sponsors, the Society has bought and repaired a hundred-year-old irrigation system that maintains a higher level of groundwater and is used twice-yearly to imitate natural spring and autumn flooding of the meadows. The area is managed with the view to accommodate not only wild animals but also the visitors who come to see them, therefore there are also maintained paths, a bird feeder, observatory towers. The Society is building ponds and clearing out aggressively growing plants, cutting the grasses only after the nesting birds had time to hatch.

The area is changing every year towards the desired goal with many species returning to it including rare and endemic ones.

=== Fauna ===
The 2017 census counts high numbers of 25 species of dragonflies including endangered and rare ones, 217 species of beetles, hundreds of amphibians, and rising variety of birds.

Over ten-year period of the reserve's existence there have been observed 166 bird species. More than ten of them even nesting there including northern lapwing, common snipe, water rail, spotted crake and little crake. In 2016 there have been observed for example short-eared owl, common crane, northern shoveler or garganey, attempting to nest thanks to the appearance of Eurasian beaver.

Among the returned amphibians are frogs and newts, newly appeared are European green toad and European fire-bellied toad.

The 25 species of the odonata genus illustrates the improving quality of the protected ecosystem, with southern emerald damselfly and yellow-winged darter dependent on the wet meadow environment, rare in the Czech Republic.

There is probably twice the counted number of beetle species including great silver water beetle, 5 listed as endangered and 6 specially protected.

=== Conservation grazing ===
In January 2018, five young Exmoor stallions arrived on loan by Česká krajina o.p.s. from Milovice Nature Reserve to help maintain the biodiversity of part of the wet meadows by grazing, creating varied environment of diverse vegetation cover which is ideal for birds - hiding in taller grasses, collecting food in areas grazed low. Since the wild horses are not being chemically dewormed, their manure is attractive to many insect species, providing additional source of food to local birds.

== Gallery ==
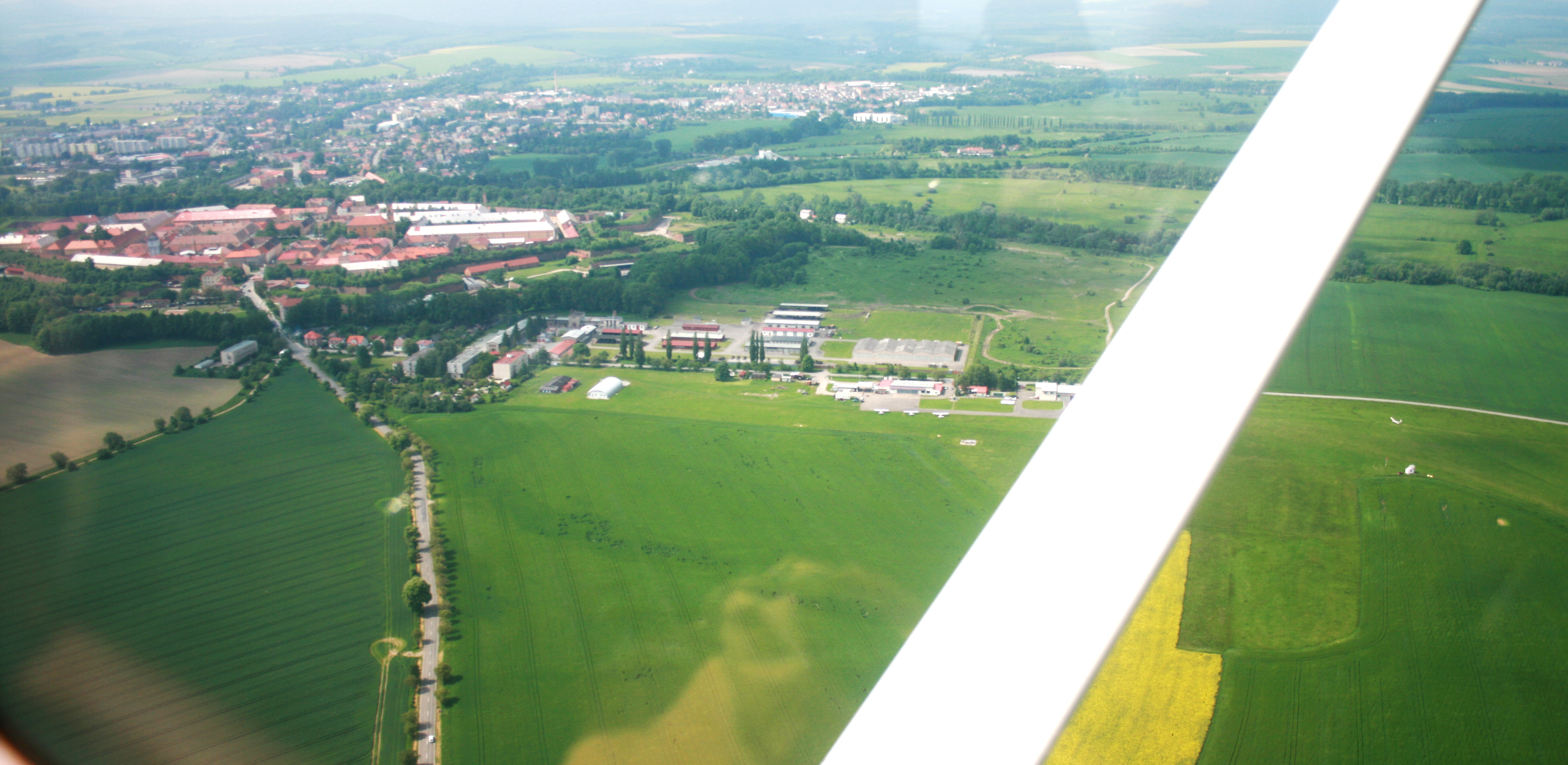
Josefov Fortress on the left, the park is to the right, photo from air.

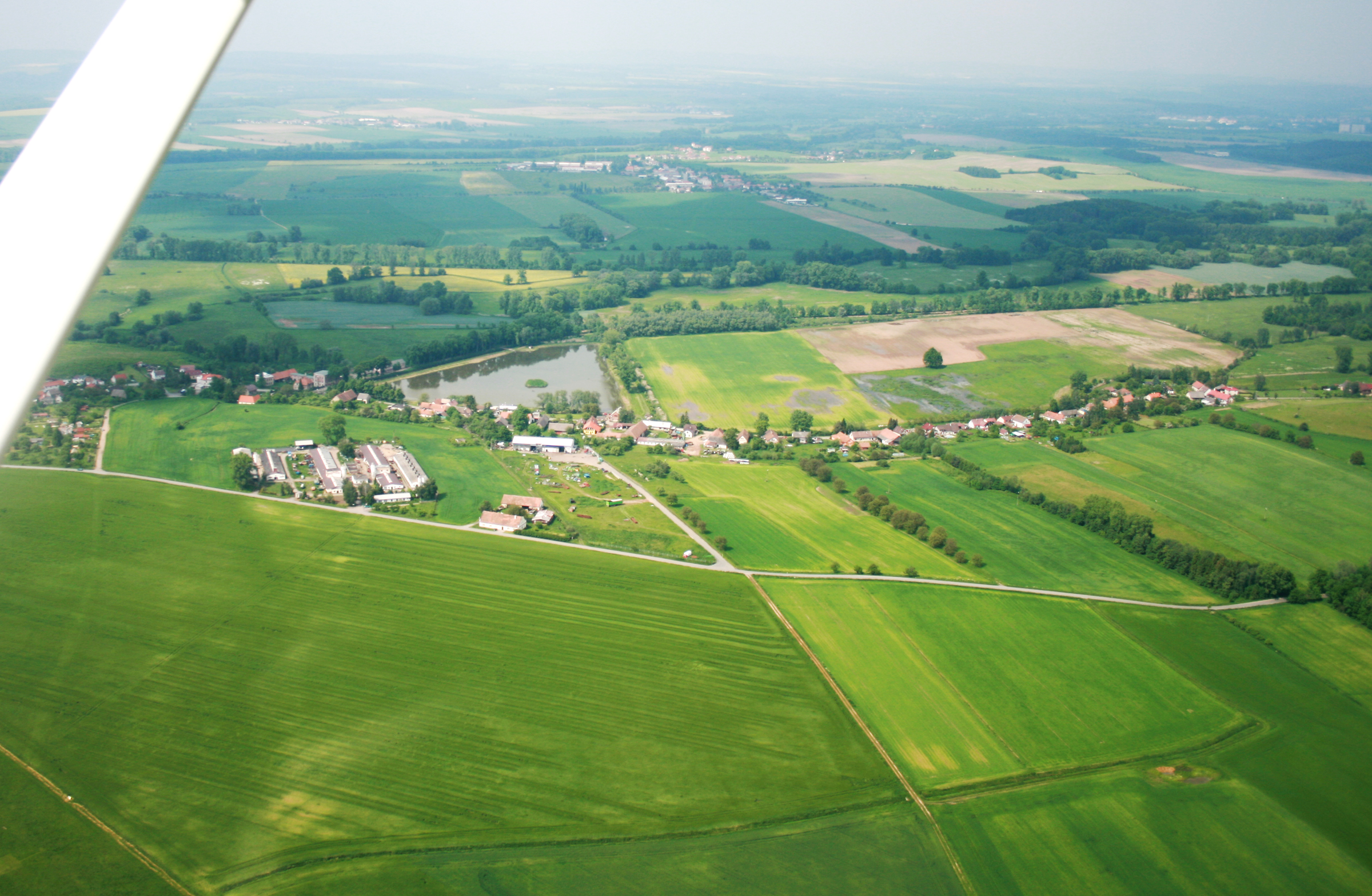
Aerial photo of the park, up and to the left of the lake.

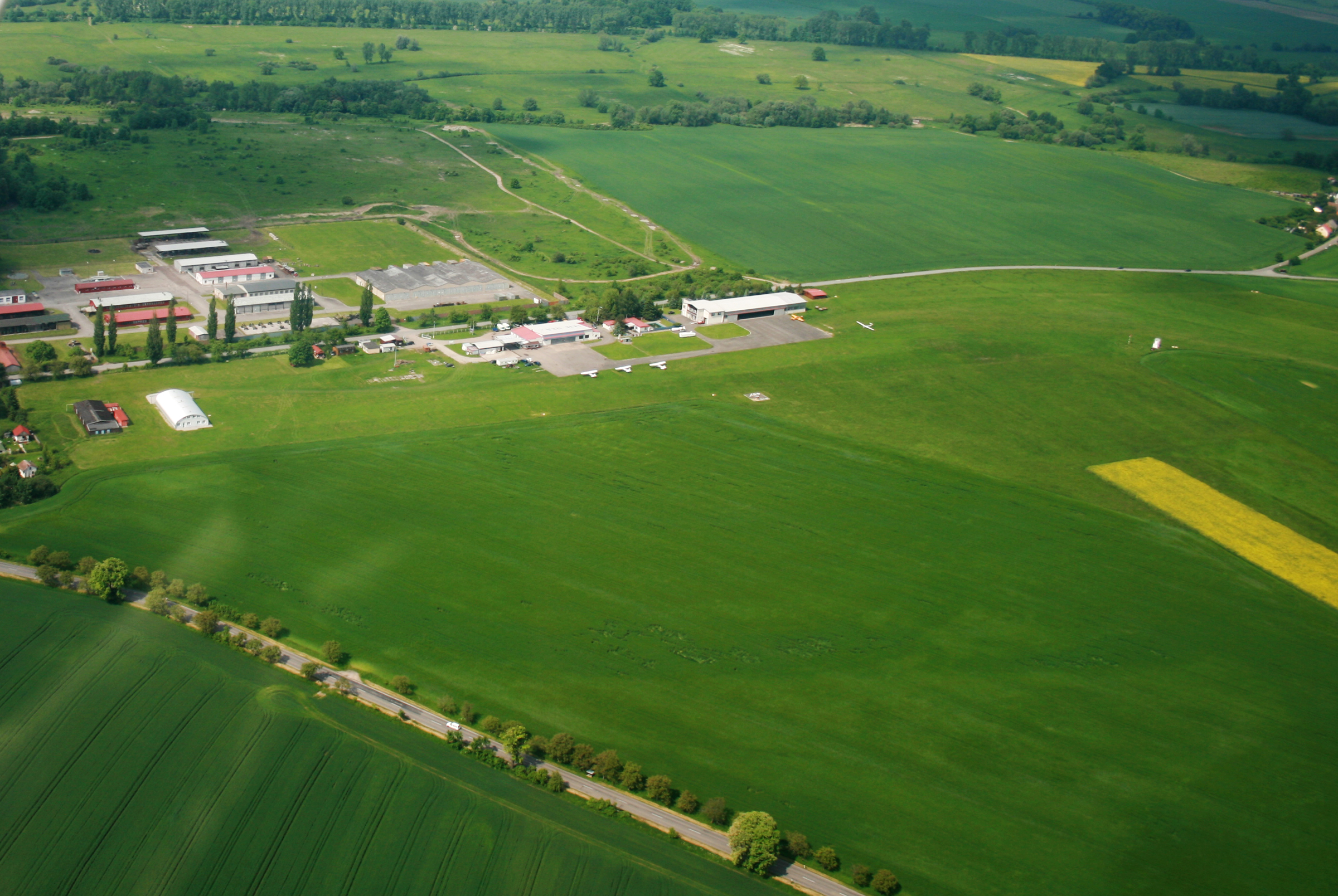
Aerial photo of Jaroměř airport, the park is the uppermost green strip seen above it.

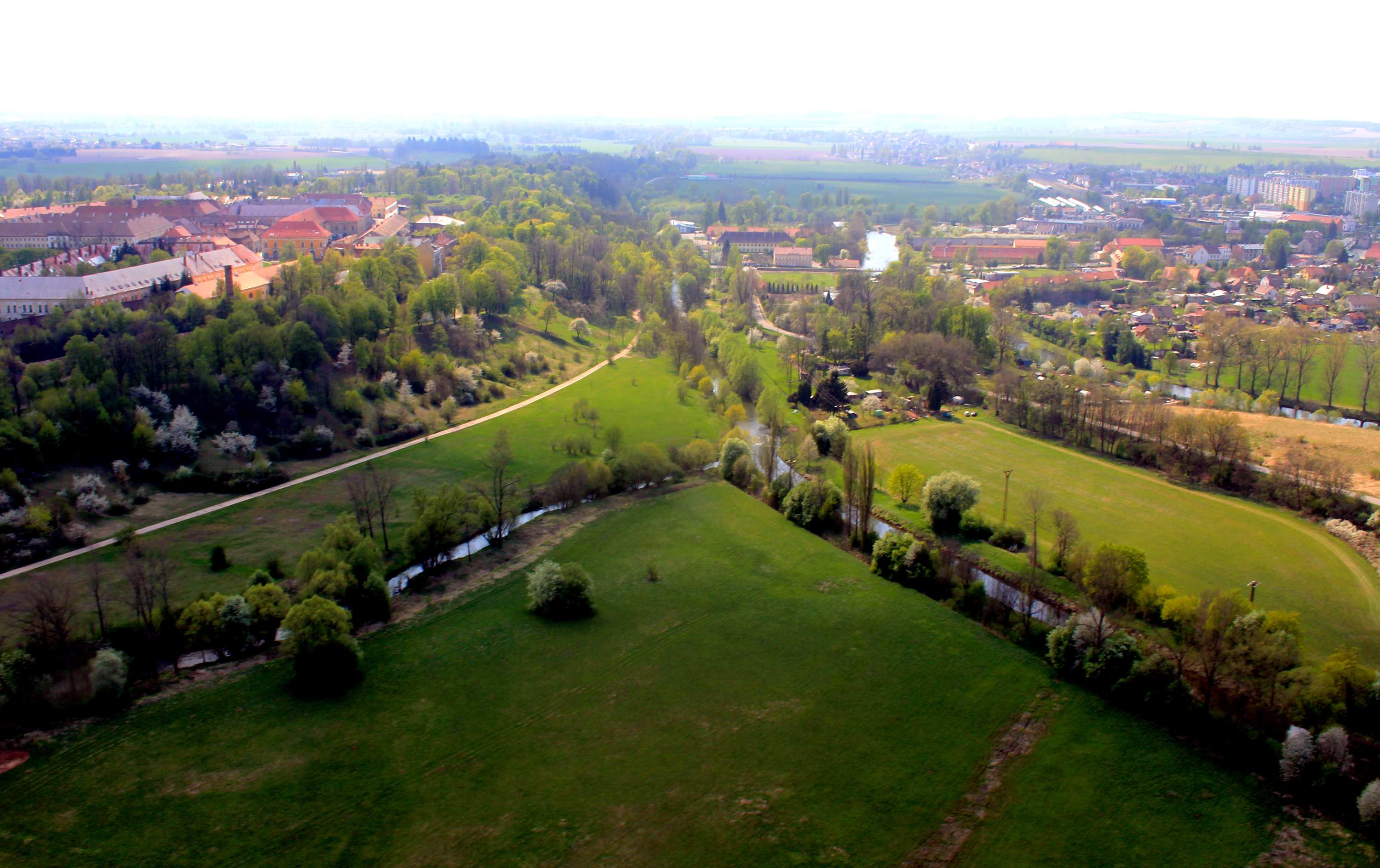
Part of Josefow Meadows viewed from air - the triangle of land between Stará Metuje and Metuje rivers.

== See also ==
- Tourism in the Czech Republic
- Protected areas of the Czech Republic
