= Šestajovice (Náchod District) =

- Municipality
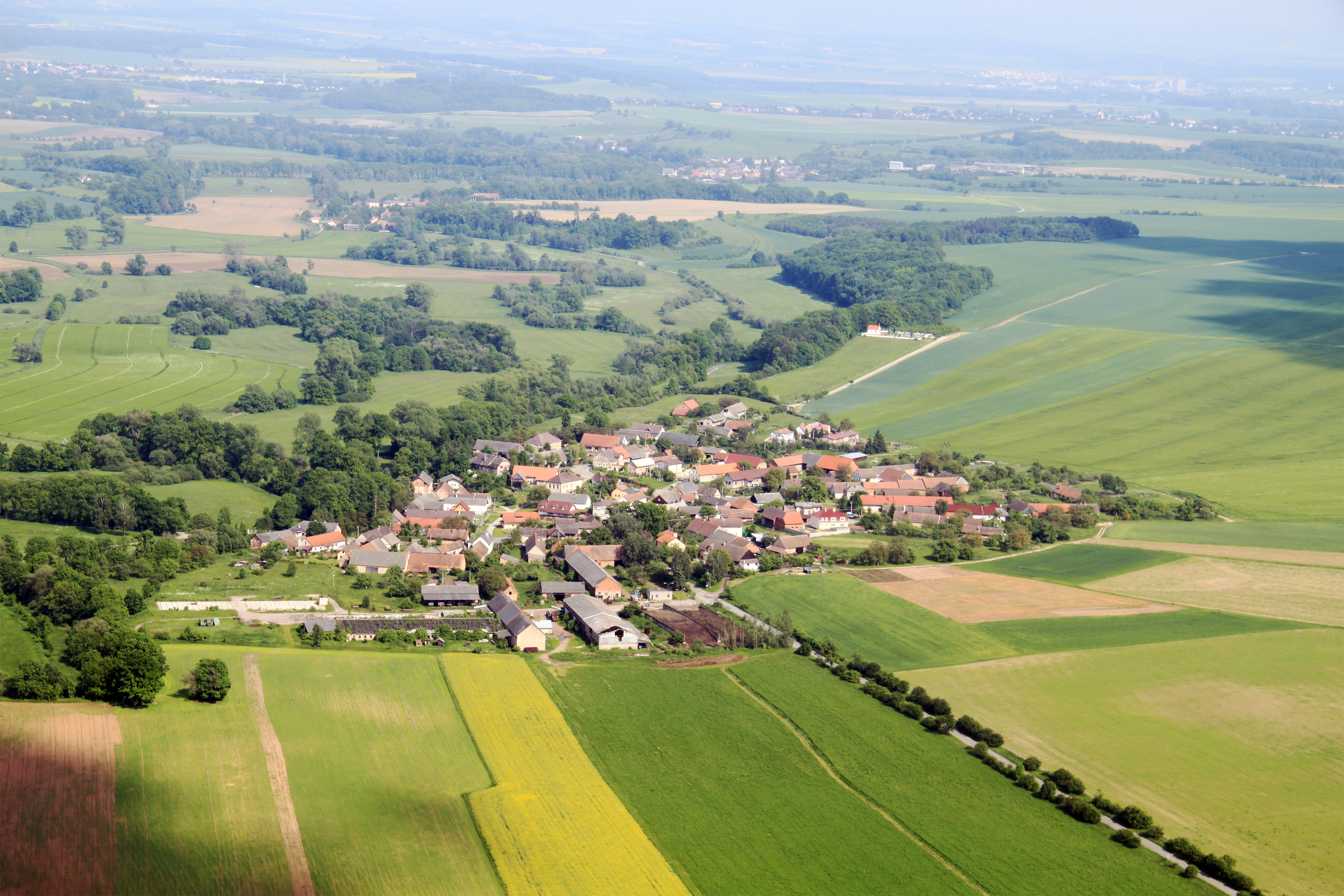
- Aerial view

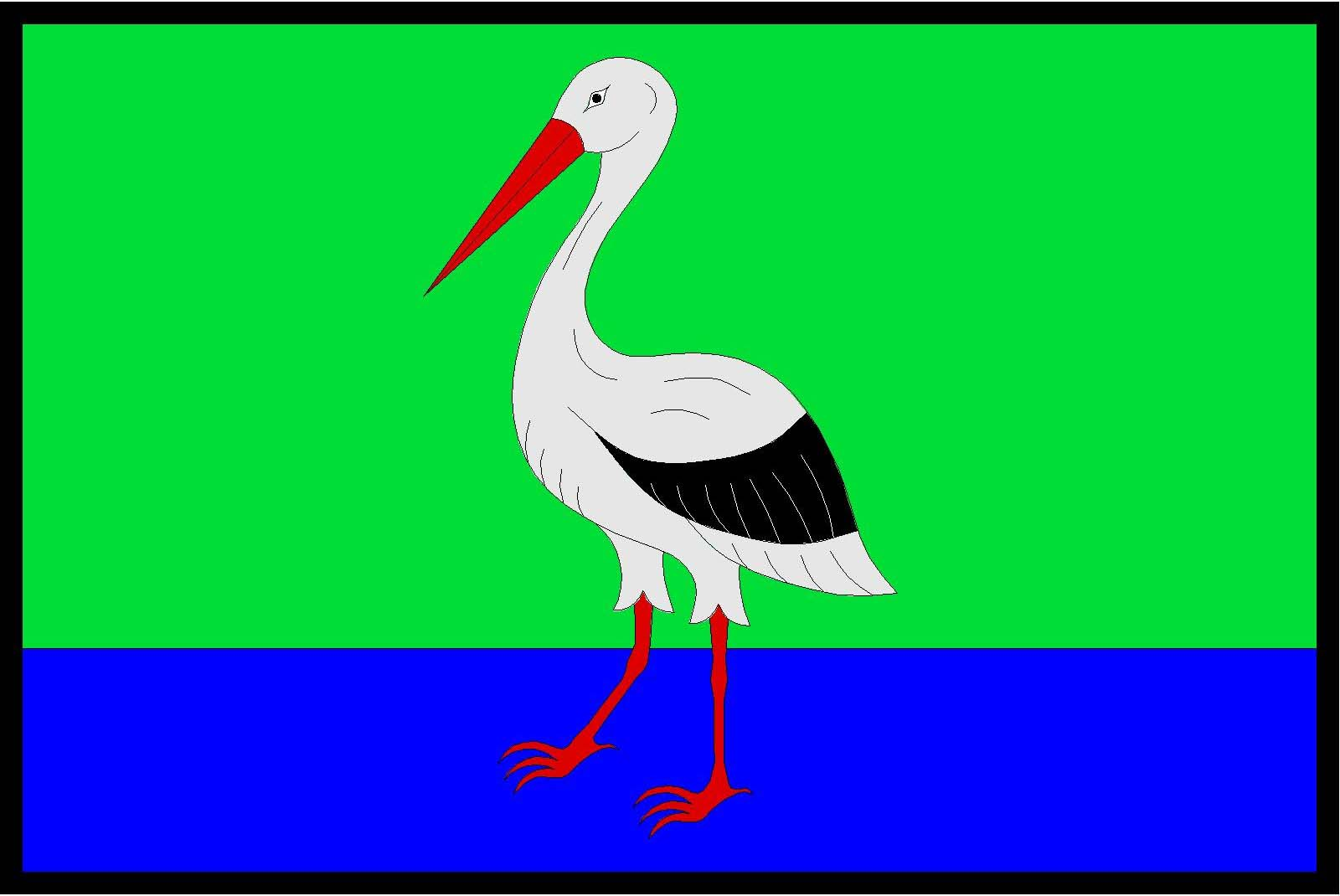
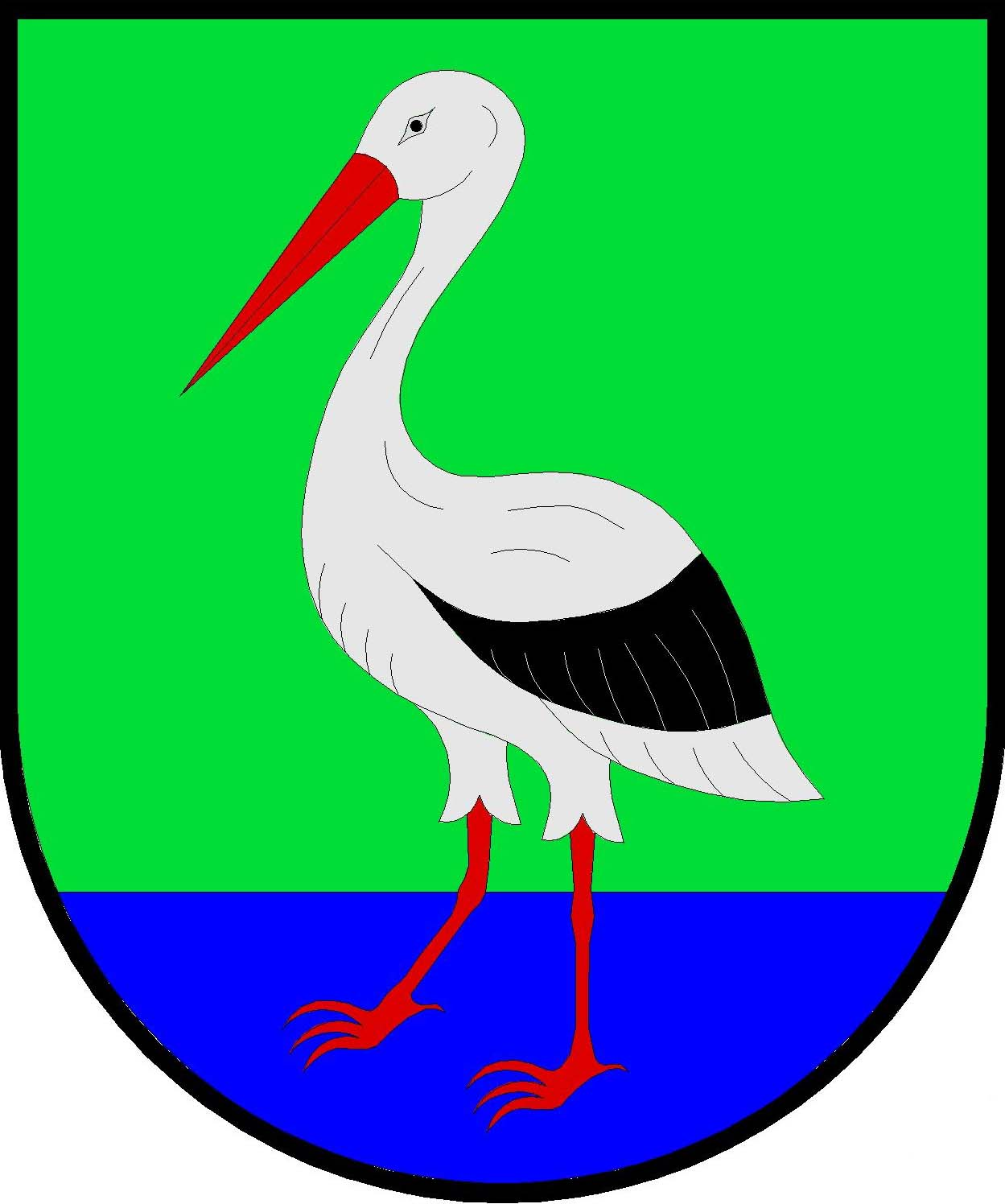
- Flag Coat of arms

- Location in the Czech Republic
- Coordinates: 50°20′28″N 16°0′29″E
- Country: Czech Republic
- Region: Hradec Králové
- District: Náchod
- First mentioned: 1450

Area
  - Total: 7.52 km^{2} (2.90 sq mi)
- Elevation: 274 m (899 ft)

Population (2026-01-01)
  - Total: 165
  - Density: 21.9/km^{2} (56.8/sq mi)
- Time zone: UTC+1 (CET)
  - Summer (DST): UTC+2 (CEST)
- Postal code: 551 01
- Website: sestajovicena.cz

Šestajovice is a municipality and village in Náchod District in the Hradec Králové Region of the Czech Republic. It has about 200 inhabitants.

== Administrative division ==
Šestajovice consists of two municipal parts (in brackets population according to the 2021 census):

- Šestajovice (140)
- Roztoky (38)

== Demographics ==
Historical population
| Year | Pop. | ±% |
|---|---|---|
| 1869 | 523 | — |
| 1880 | 555 | +6.1% |
| 1890 | 561 | +1.1% |
| 1900 | 523 | −6.8% |
| 1910 | 529 | +1.1% |
| 1921 | 467 | −11.7% |
| 1930 | 439 | −6.0% |
| 1950 | 304 | −30.8% |
| 1961 | 283 | −6.9% |
| 1970 | 246 | −13.1% |
| 1980 | 196 | −20.3% |
| 1991 | 175 | −10.7% |
| 2001 | 176 | +0.6% |
| 2011 | 175 | −0.6% |
| 2021 | 178 | +1.7% |
Source: Censuses
