= Studnice (Náchod District) =

- Municipality
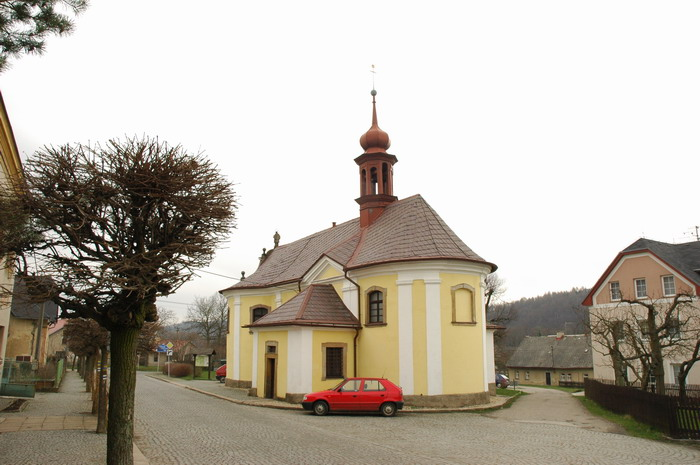
- Common with Church of St. John of Nepomuk

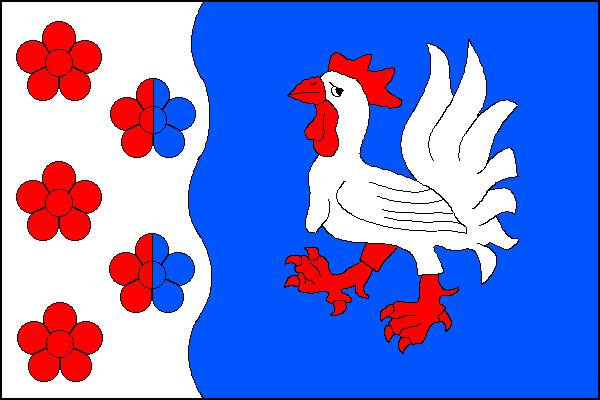
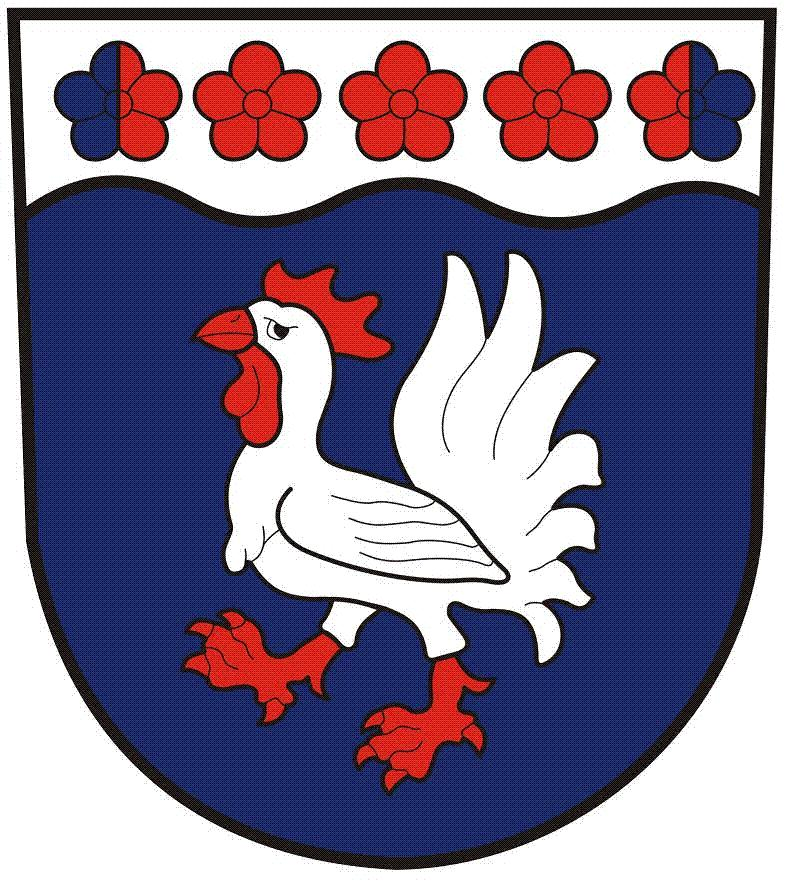
- Flag Coat of arms

- Location in the Czech Republic
- Coordinates: 50°25′17″N 16°5′24″E
- Country: Czech Republic
- Region: Hradec Králové
- District: Náchod
- First mentioned: 1447

Area
  - Total: 10.38 km^{2} (4.01 sq mi)
- Elevation: 342 m (1,122 ft)

Population (2026-01-01)
  - Total: 1,168
  - Density: 112.5/km^{2} (291.4/sq mi)
- Time zone: UTC+1 (CET)
  - Summer (DST): UTC+2 (CEST)
- Postal codes: 547 01, 549 48, 552 03
- Website: www.obecstudnicena.cz

Studnice is a municipality and village in Náchod District in the Hradec Králové Region of the Czech Republic. It has about 1,200 inhabitants.

== Administrative division ==
Studnice consists of seven municipal parts (in brackets population according to the 2021 census):

- Studnice (359)
- Bakov (47)
- Řešetova Lhota (189)
- Starkoč (295)
- Třtice (38)
- Všeliby (94)
- Zblov (57)

== Demographics ==
Historical population
Year	Pop.	±%
1869	1,678	—
1880	1,560	−7.0%
1890	1,496	−4.1%
1900	1,423	−4.9%
1910	1,356	−4.7%
1921	1,315	−3.0%
1930	1,309	−0.5%
1950	1,131	−13.6%
1961	1,142	+1.0%
1970	1,029	−9.9%
1980	965	−6.2%
1991	916	−5.1%
2001	959	+4.7%
2011	1,055	+10.0%
2021	1,079	+2.3%
Source: Censuses
