= Nahořany =

- Municipality
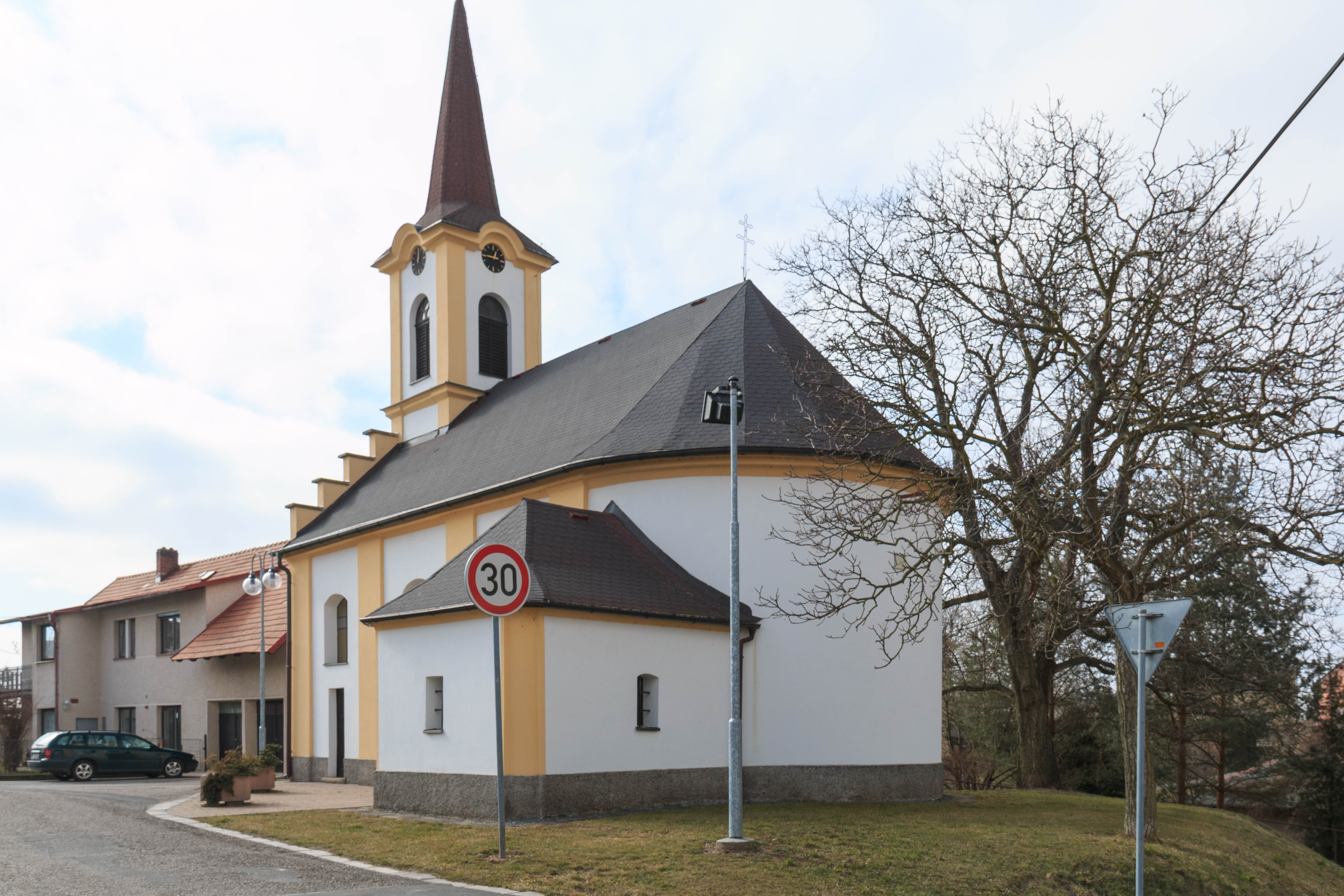
- Church of the Holy Family

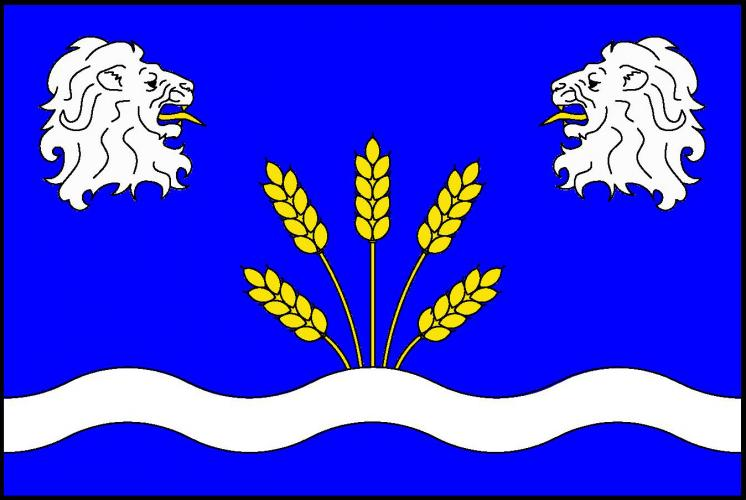
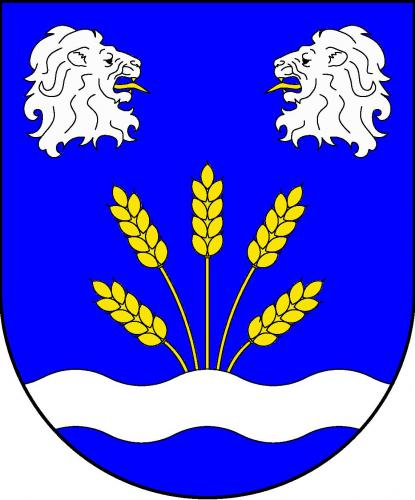
- Flag Coat of arms

- Location in the Czech Republic
- Coordinates: 50°21′6″N 16°4′57″E
- Country: Czech Republic
- Region: Hradec Králové
- District: Náchod
- First mentioned: 1415

Area
  - Total: 14.16 km^{2} (5.47 sq mi)
- Elevation: 291 m (955 ft)

Population (2026-01-01)
  - Total: 623
  - Density: 44.0/km^{2} (114/sq mi)
- Time zone: UTC+1 (CET)
  - Summer (DST): UTC+2 (CEST)
- Postal codes: 549 01, 549 07, 551 01, 552 03
- Website: nahorany.eu

Nahořany is a municipality and village in Náchod District in the Hradec Králové Region of the Czech Republic. It has about 600 inhabitants.

== Administrative division ==
Nahořany consists of five municipal parts (in brackets population according to the 2021 census):

- Nahořany (371)
- Dolsko (54)
- Doubravice (32)
- Lhota (79)
- Městec (36)

== Demographics ==
Historical population
| Year | Pop. | ±% |
|---|---|---|
| 1869 | 1,121 | — |
| 1880 | 1,185 | +5.7% |
| 1890 | 1,112 | −6.2% |
| 1900 | 1,103 | −0.8% |
| 1910 | 1,033 | −6.3% |
| 1921 | 1,009 | −2.3% |
| 1930 | 927 | −8.1% |
| 1950 | 659 | −28.9% |
| 1961 | 657 | −0.3% |
| 1970 | 571 | −13.1% |
| 1980 | 553 | −3.2% |
| 1991 | 500 | −9.6% |
| 2001 | 478 | −4.4% |
| 2011 | 530 | +10.9% |
| 2021 | 572 | +7.9% |
Source: Censuses
