= 342 (disambiguation) =

342 may refer to:

- 342 (year) a year of Christian Era or Common Era
- 342 (number) the integer represented by the English-language numeral "three hundred and forty-two"
- 342 BC a year

== Other uses ==
- 342 (album) a 2010 studio album by Pin-Up Went Down
- 342 Endymion a main belt asteroid, discovered by Max Wolf
