= Sing Along Songs for the Damned & Delirious =

Sing-Along Songs for the Damned & Delirious

Studio album by Diablo Swing Orchestra
- Released: September 21, 2009
- Genres: Swing; jazz; avant-garde metal; symphonic metal
- Length: 48:13
- Label: Ascendance Records
- Producer: Roberto Laghi

Diablo Swing Orchestra chronology
The Butcher's Ballroom (2006)	Sing-Along Songs for the Damned & Delirious (2009)	Pandora's Piñata (2012)

Professional ratings
Review scores
Source	Rating
AllMusic	4.0/5 stars
Metal Storm	(8.8/10)

Sing Along Songs for the Damned & Delirious is the second studio album by the Swedish avant-garde metal band Diablo Swing Orchestra. It was released on September 21, 2009 on Ascendance Records. It was produced by In Flames producer Roberto Laghi at IF Studios in Gothenburg, Sweden.

It is the last album to feature Andreas Halvardsson as drummer, and the first with trombonist Daniel Hedin and trumpeter Martin Isaksson as session members. However Hedin and Isaksson joined the band as full-time members in 2011 only, with Sing Along Songs for the Damned & Delirious becoming the last album with the band being a sextet.

Additionally, opera singer Kosma Ranuer was hired as a session vocalist for this album, performing the male vocal parts on the duets "A Rancid Romance" and "Vodka Inferno" alongside lead vocalist Annlouice Wolgers, and performing most of the lead vocals on "Bedlam Sticks". Since he did not join the band as a full time member after this, lead live vocals for these parts were subsequently performed by cellist Johannes Bergion on "A Rancid Romance", by guitarist Daniel Håkansson on "Bedlam Sticks", and initially by Håkansson on "Vodka Inferno" before later being taken over by trumpet player Martin Isaksson.

All songs are credited to Diablo Swing Orchestra; however, according to singer and guitarist Daniel Håkansson, the songs were mostly written by him and other guitarist Pontus Mantefors.

== Track listing ==
All tracks are written by Diablo Swing Orchestra.

No.	Title	Lead vocals	Length
1.	"A Tap Dancer’s Dilemma"	Pontus Mantefors, AnnLouice Wolgers, Daniel Håkansson	5:12
2.	"A Rancid Romance"	Wolgers, Kosma Ranuer	4:27
3.	"Lucy Fears the Morning Star"	Wolgers	6:34
4.	"Bedlam Sticks"	Ranuer	3:29
5.	"New World Widows"	Wolgers	5:56
6.	"Siberian Love Affairs"		0:58
7.	"Vodka Inferno"	Wolgers, Kosma Ranuer	4:08
8.	"Memoirs of a Roadkill"	Håkansson	3:30
9.	"Ricerca dell’anima"	Wolgers	5:34
10.	"Stratosphere Serenade"	Håkansson, Wolgers	8:25

== Credits ==
=== Band members ===
- Daniel Håkansson – lead vocals, guitar
- Annlouice Wolgers – lead vocals
- Pontus Mantefors – Lead vocals, guitar, synthesizer
- Andy Johansson – bass
- Johannes Bergion – cello
- Andreas Halvardsson – drums

=== Additional musicians ===
- Daniel Hedin - trombone
- Martin Isaksson - trumpet
- David Werthen - double bass
- Henrik Bergion - piano, accordion, harmonium
- Jonatan Jonsson - clarinet
- Tobias Hedlund - percussion
- Kosma Ranuer - baritone vocals

=== Production ===
- Roberto Laghi – production
- Peter Bergting – cover art
