= B-Sides (Pin-Up Went Down EP) =

EP by Pin-Up Went Down
- Released: 10 November 2012
- Recorded: 2008/2010
- Genre: Avant-garde metal; art pop
- Length: 17:22
- Label: Self-released
- Producer: Alexis Damien

Pin-Up Went Down chronology
342 (2010)	B-Sides (2012)	Remasters (2017)

B-Sides is an EP by French avant-garde metal band Pin-Up Went Down, and their third release overall. It was independently-released by the band on 10 November 2012, being available for download on their official Bandcamp page. As its name implies, it is a collection of outtakes from their two studio albums, 2 Unlimited and 342, and at the time was meant to serve as a teaser for their unreleased third studio album, Perfreaktion.

== Track listing ==
All lyrics are written by Asphodel; all music is composed by Pin-Up Went Down

No.	Title	Length
1.	"My Never-Heard"	3:30
2.	"Irrelevant Waste"	3:43
3.	"Add as Fiend"	3:08
4.	"Ego Ego Go"	3:55
5.	"Sun XP"	3:06

== Personnel ==
- Aurélie Raidron (Asphodel) – vocals, photography, cover art
- Alexis Damien – vocals, guitars, bass, keyboards, piano, drums, production, mixing, mastering
- Romain Greffe – keyboards (on tracks 2 and 3)
