= 342 (album) =

Studio album by Pin-Up Went Down
- Released: 28 June 2010
- Recorded: 2009/2010
- Genres: Avant-garde metal; art pop; progressive metal; death metal
- Length: 42:27
- Label: Ascendance Records
- Producer: Alexis Damien

Pin-Up Went Down chronology
2 Unlimited (2008)	342 (2010)	B-Sides (2012)

Professional ratings
Review scores
Source	Rating
Mind over Metal	4.5/5 link
Heavy Blog Is Heavy	4.5/5 link

342 is the second studio album by French avant-garde metal band Pin-Up Went Down, released on 28 June 2010 through Ascendance Records. It is the first album of the band which counted with the participation of Alexis Damien's brother, Nicolas Damien.

The title of the track "Vaginaal Nathrakh" is a pun on the name of British extreme metal band Anaal Nathrakh, while "Murphy in the Sky with Dæmons" may be a possible allusion to The Beatles' song "Lucy in the Sky with Diamonds". Judging by the song's lyrics, the "Murphy" mentioned in the song's title is Edward A. Murphy, famous for popularizing the concept of "Murphy's law".

== Track listing ==
All lyrics are written by Asphodel; all music is composed by Alexis and Nicolas Damien.

No.	Title	Length
1.	"Diapositive"	3:25
2.	"Escargot"	2:20
3.	"Porcelain Hours"	2:42
4.	"Essence of I"	4:03
5.	"Khabod of My Aba"	5:08
6.	"Home"	2:33
7.	"Vaginaal Nathrakh"	4:25
8.	"Pictures to Speak To"	3:37
9.	"Murphy in the Sky with Dæmons"	5:44
10.	"Paradoxical Sarabanda"	3:15
11.	"Aquarium"	5:15

== Critical reception ==
As with their previous album, 2 Unlimited, 342 was also critically acclaimed; Mind over Metal gave it a 4.5 out of 5, comparing the band's sonority and aesthetics favourably to Alexis Damien's former project, Carnival in Coal. Writing for Teeth of the Divine, Mikko K. gave the album a favourable review, also comparing Pin-Up Went Down to Carnival in Coal and to The 3rd and the Mortal as well. Heavy Blog Is Heavy also gave 342 4.5 out of 5 stars, stating: "Pin-Up Went Down have every capability of being a present-day Mr. Bungle; if their name was put out there more, that could very well happen. For fans of experimental, progressive and avant-garde music, Pin-Up Went Down's 342 is a must-listen".

== Personnel ==
- Aurélie Raidron (Asphodel) – vocals, photography, cover art
- Alexis Damien – vocals, guitars, bass, keyboards, piano, drums, production, mixing, mastering
- Nicolas Damien – guitars, keyboards
- Romain Greffe – keyboards (on track 1)
- Benoît Bugeia – keyboards (on track 4)
