= Brutal Assault =

Extreme metal music festival in Jaroměř, Czechia

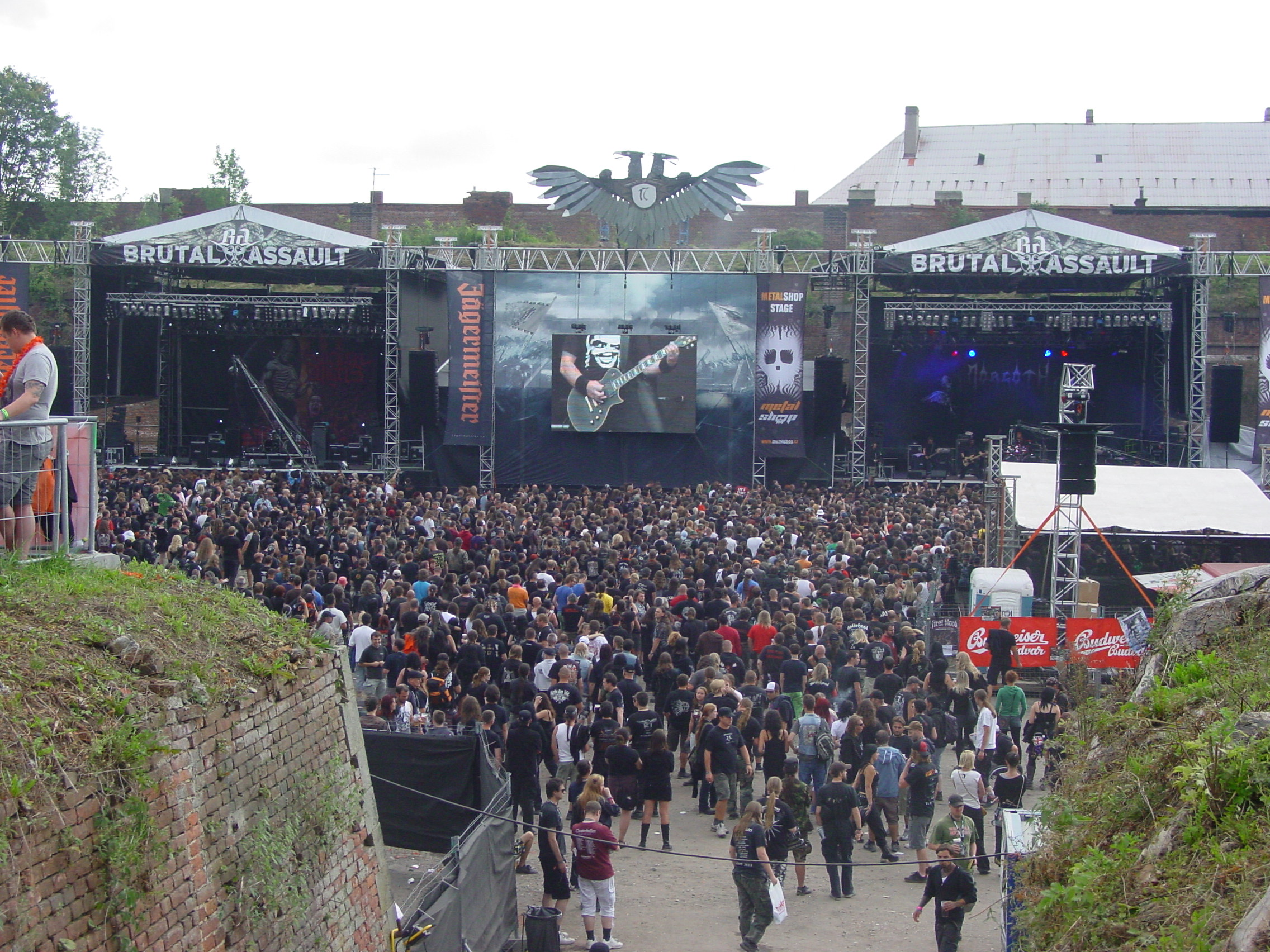
- Brutal Assault 2012. The two main stages are built against the walls of Josefov Fortress.
- Genre: Extreme metal, heavy metal, hardcore punk, experimental
- Dates: Early August
- Locations: Josefov Fortress, Jaroměř, Czech Republic
- Years active: 1996–present
- Website: brutalassault.cz/en/

Brutal Assault is an open-air extreme metal festival that takes place in the 18th-century army fortress Josefov, located in Jaroměř, Czechia. It is held each August early in the month from Wednesday until Saturday. The festival started in 1996, originally focused on grindcore. For many years, it was a small event with mainly Czech and Slovak bands performing. It changed location several times and grew into a large event by 2006, when over 7,000 people attended the festival in Svojšice. After moving to Josefov, attendances grew further to 15,000 in 2012 and the festival has operated two alternating main stages since. Currently, Brutal Assault features artists that perform all forms of extreme metal, including some of the genre's most prominent figures, as well as artists with dark and intense styles from genres outside of heavy metal such as punk rock, experimental rock and electronic. The festival motto is: "Against violence and intolerance".

== Location ==
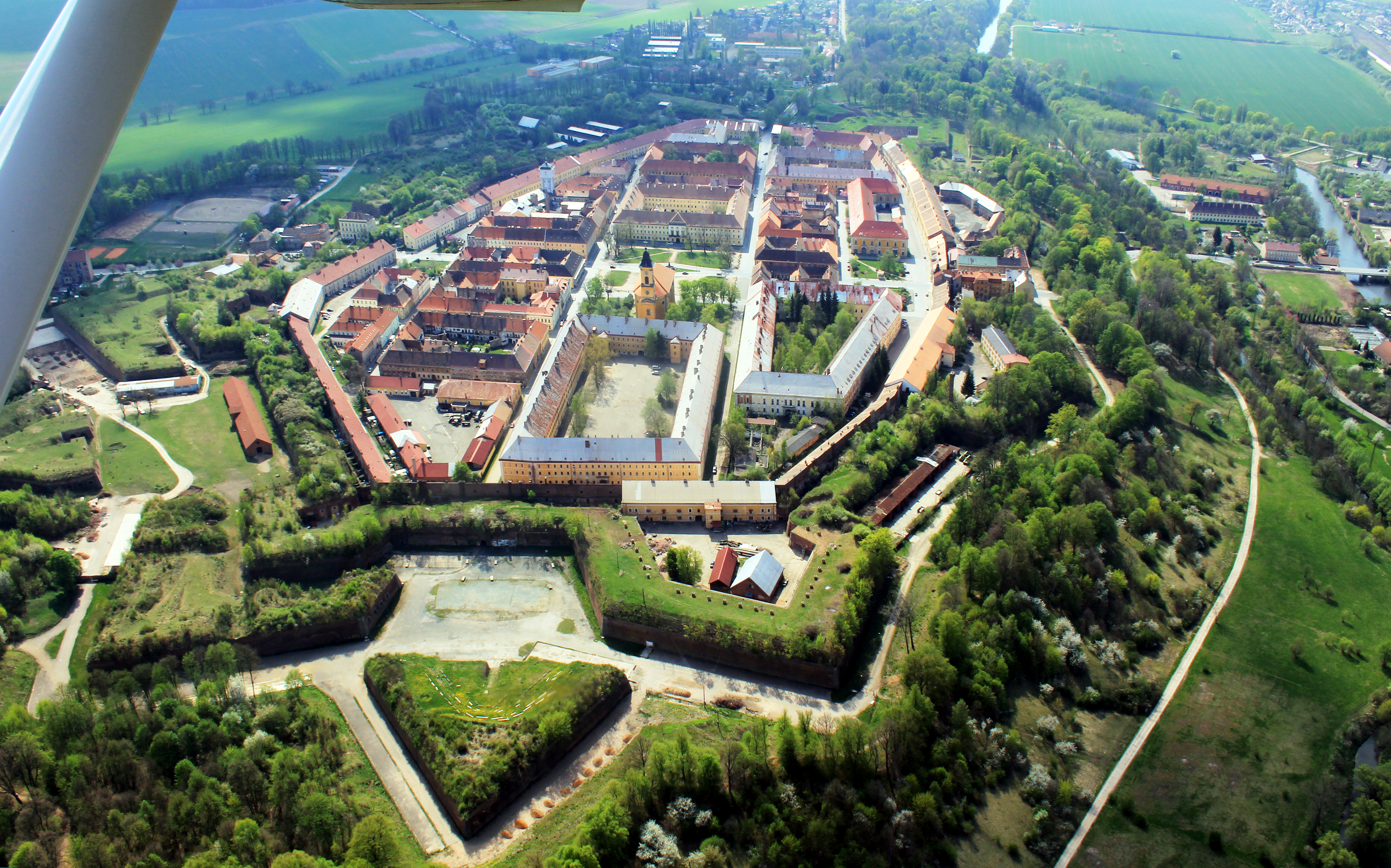
Jaroměř from air, with the fortress visible at the bottom of the picture.

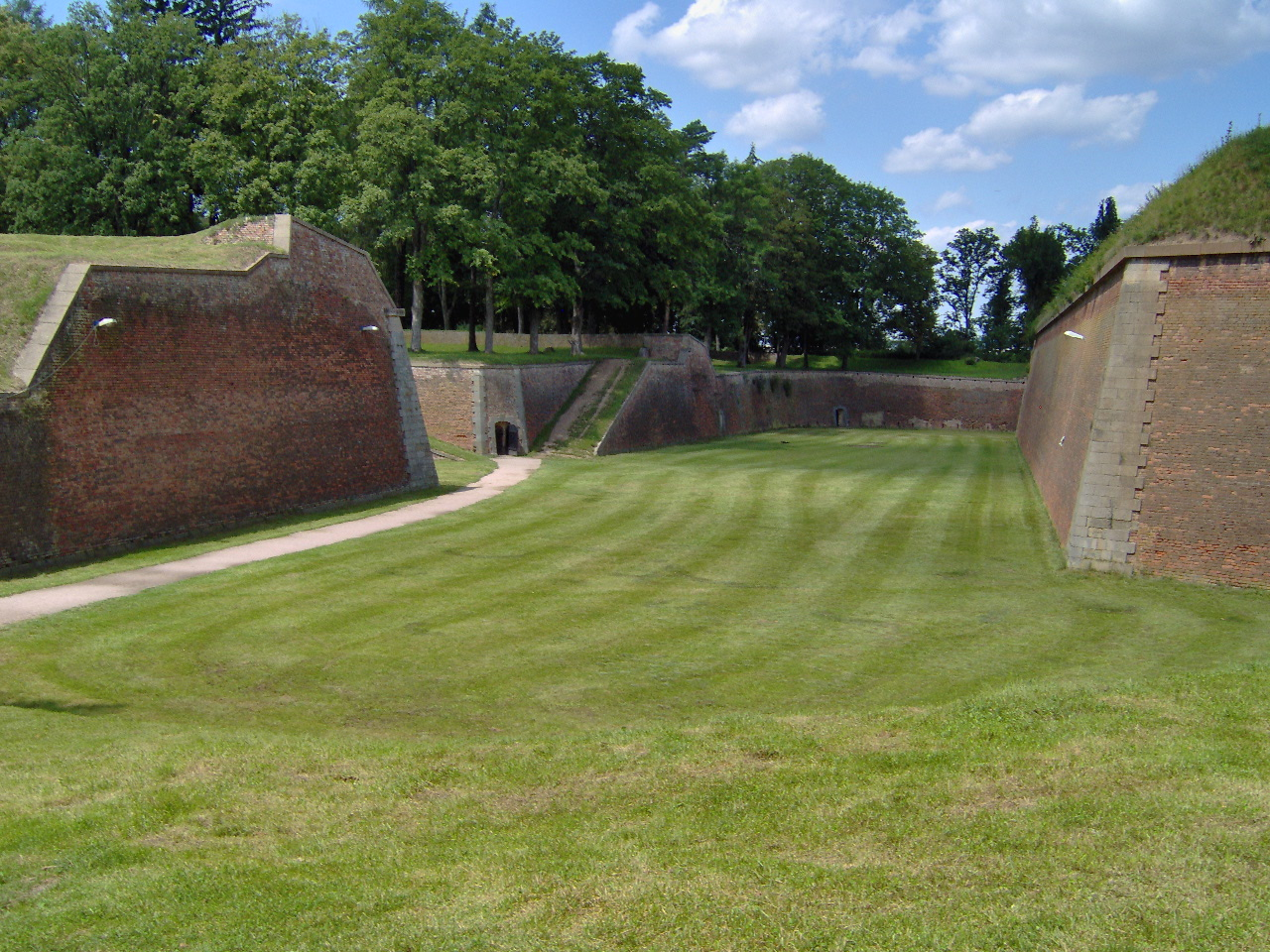
A view inside of the fortress.

Brutal Assault takes place in Josefov, an army fortress built between 1780 and 1787 by Emperor Joseph II on the left bank of the Elbe and Mettau rivers near Jaroměř. The two main stages are built against the fortress walls.

=== Safety ===
Brutal Assault offers mandatory cashless payment with a wristband chip, reducing risk of lost items or theft. Guests can keep their valuables in deposit boxes provided by the festival organisers for a fee.

The site is fully accessible to disabled visitors.

== 2014 ==
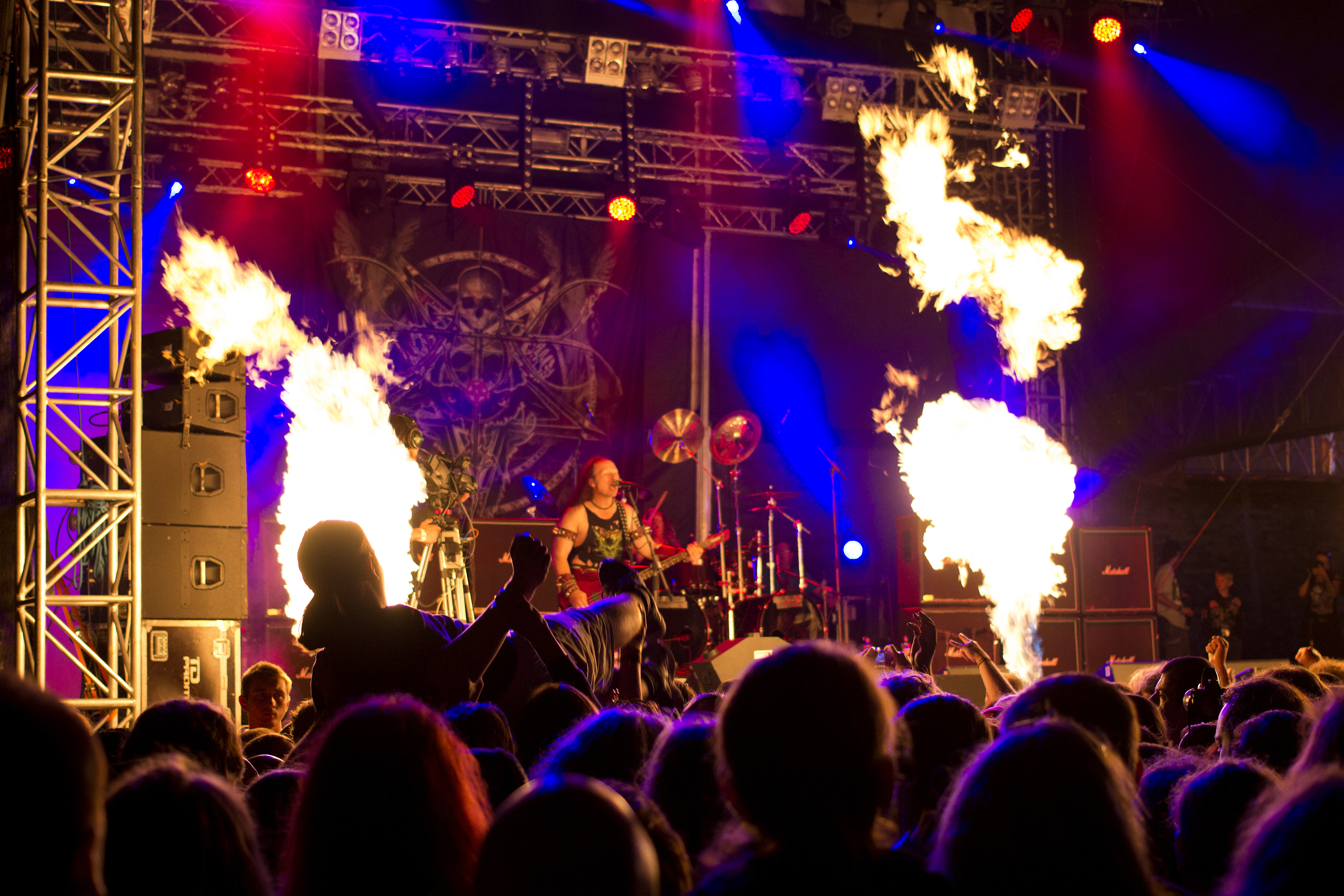
Venom performing as the headliner of the first day at the 2014 event.

The nineteenth annual festival was held from Wednesday 6 August to Saturday 9 August 2014. It was headlined by Slayer, Amon Amarth, Satyricon, Venom, Bring Me the Horizon, Children of Bodom, Devin Townsend and Down. Three bands were announced but eventually had to be cancelled: Strife, Arsonists Get All the Girls and Gorguts (who were instead announced for Brutal Assault 2015).

Double Main Stage
Wednesday	Thursday	Friday	Saturday
Suburban Terrorist; Keep on Rotting; Flotsam and Jetsam; The Agonist; High on Fire; Chthonic; Terrorizer; Venom; Modern Day Babylon	Panychida; Havok; Ringworm; Texas in July; Pentagram Chile iwrestledabearonce Church of Misery; Onslaught; Misery Index; Månegarm; Ignite; Crowbar; Obituary; Red Fang; Suffocation; Bring Me the Horizon; Slayer; Children of Bodom; Architects; Katatonia; Khold	Isacaarum; Rise of Surya; Cripper; Fleshless; GrandExit; Obscure Sphinx; Heiden; Mors Principium Est; Skeletonwitch; Fleshgod Apocalypse; Carnival in Coal; Unleashed; H_{2}O; Six Feet Under; Blindead; The Devin Townsend Project; Amon Amarth; Shining; Broken Hope; Combichrist; Nightfall	Spasm; Liveevil; Nervecell; Martyrdöd; Insania; Severe Torture; Hacktivist; Dew-Scented; Manes; Impaled Nazarene; Cruachan; August Burns Red; Sodom; Soilwork; Sick of It All; Krabathor; Down; Satyricon; Converge; My Dying Bride; Hail of Bullets

Metalgate Stage
Thursday	Friday	Saturday
Siberian Meat Grinder; Gutted; Brutality Will Prevail; Feastem; Inquisition; Epicardiectomy; God Is an Astronaut (extended set); Gehenna ? Heaving Earth	Infernal Tenebra; Rats Get Fat; První hoře Kraków; The Ocean; Pungent Stench; Manes (acoustic show); Enthroned; Mgła; Worship; Radiolokator	Hammercult; Okkultokrati; In Mourning; Exivious; Repulsion; Carnival in Coal; Benediction; Jesu; Aosoth; Dodecahedron; Six Degrees of Separation

== 2024 ==
The twenty-seventh annual festival was held from 7 August to 10 August 2024. It was headlined by Architects, Behemoth, Emperor, The Dillinger Escape Plan, Testament, Satryicon, Carcass, Motionless in White, The Amity Affliction, Deicide, Spiritbox, Exodus, Jinjer, Baroness, Laibach, Hatebreed, and Abbath.

Double Main Stage
Wednesday	Thursday	Friday	Saturday
Skeletal Remains Exumer Evil Invaders Severe Torture Sylosis Terrorizer Grand Magus The Black Dahlia Murder Red Fang Spiritbox Hatebreed Deicide Exodus Motionless in White Abbath (performing Immortal) Dark Tranquility	Necrot Guilt Trip Pupil Slicer Bodysnatcher Obscura Escuela Grind Havok Riverside Incantation Whitechapel Madball Forbidden The Amity Affliction Carcass Testament Satyricon Vomitory	Party Cannon Distant Rotten Sound Lik Svalbard Kalmah Čad Legion of the Damned Aborted Toxic Holocaust Candlemass Left to Die Jinjer Cult of Fire (with Bohemian Symphony Orchestra Prague) Architects Laibach Deathstats	Cloak Mental Cruelty Show Me the Body Cytotoxin Cancer Bats Broken Hope Plini Gorod Pestilience Sadus Impaled Nazarene Primordial Textures Emperor The Dillinger Escape Plan Behemoth Heathen

Octagon Stage
Wednesday	Thursday	Friday	Saturday
This is Hell Srefa Hexvessel Diskord Aeon Winds	My Diligence Bewitched Yellow Eyes Tulus	Mallephyr The Omnific Exorcizphobia Take Offense Khold	Brutal Kids Doomas Totenmesse Gaupa Dopelord Stoned Jesus

Obscure Stage
Wednesday	Thursday	Friday	Saturday
Humanity's Last Breath Hirax Finntroll Vltimas Brutus Triumph of Death (performed by Hellhammer) Armored Saint Mortuary Drape Sněť	Oceans Ate Alaska Blockheads Dopethrone God Is An Astronaut Born of Osiris 1914 Baroness Soil Uada Master Boot Record	Ufomammut Imperial Triumphant Villagers of Ioannina City Cynic Unto Others Cephalic Carnage Ved Buens Ende Emma Ruth Rundle Kampfar Akhlys	Kronos Persefone Night Verses Chthe'ilist Julie Christmas Dødheimsgard New Model Army Worm Darvaza
