= Swagger & Stroll Down the Rabbit Hole =

Studio album by Diablo Swing Orchestra
- Released: November 2, 2021
- Genres: Avant-garde metal; progressive metal
- Length: 60:47
- Label: Candlelight
- Producer: Roberto Laghi

Diablo Swing Orchestra chronology
Pacifisticuffs (2017)	Swagger & Stroll Down the Rabbit Hole (2021)

Singles from Swagger & Stroll Down the Rabbit Hole
- 1. "War Painted Valentine" Released: 13 August 2021; 2. "Celebremos lo Inevitable" Released: 23 September 2021; 3. "Speed Dating an Arsonist" Released: 22 October 2021

Swagger & Stroll Down the Rabbit Hole is the fifth studio album by Swedish avant-garde metal band Diablo Swing Orchestra. It was released on 2 November 2021 via Candlelight Records and it was once again produced by Roberto Laghi. It is the band's first album to feature the same line-up as its predecessor.

"War Painted Valentine" was released as the album's first single on August 17, 2021; the second single and video, "Celebremos lo Inevitable", their first song entirely sung in Spanish, paying homage to the Mexican holiday Dia de los Muertos, was released on September 23, 2021. On October 22, 2021, they released the third single and video, "Speed Dating an Arsonist".

The album was acclaimed by critics for its uniqueness, blend of genres, and songwriting.

== Background and production ==
On 3 August 2019, the band shared that they had started working on their fifth studio album on their Facebook page, stating "12 songs in various stages of completion so far. Hoping to start recordings during the summer of 2020."

On 21 February 2020, the band stated that recording for the new album would start on 4 May in Gothenburg. Two days later, they announced the title. Recording for the album concluded on 29 August with the recording of the Hammond organ parts.

By late October 2020, the band already had the title, but not the release date nor a label for the album. The track listing was revealed in December of that year, when the band expected to have the album released by the first quarter of 2021. Following COVID-19 related setbacks, they stated in April 2021 that mastering was the only part of the album left to complete, and that they were hoping for a release the same year. On 15 June 2021, the band announced that the first single from the album would be released in August and the second in October, with the album itself set for a November release.

The album marked first-time lead vocal appearances for trumpet player Martin Isaksson on "Malign Monologues" and cellist Johannes Bergion on "Saluting the Reckoning", and also featured vocal contributions from all members (except for Anders Johansson) for the first time on "War Painted Valentine".

== Critical reception ==
Professional ratings
Review scores
Source	Rating
Angry Metal Guy	4.5/5.0
Metal Hammer	4/5 stars
Sonic Perspectives	9.1/10

Swagger & Stroll Down the Rabbit Hole was acclaimed by critics. Angry Metal Guy praised the album's production (having criticized that of the previous album Pacifisticuffs) and blend of genres and influences, ultimately stating that the band is "simply too ambitious, too creative, and too talented for me to capture what makes them special. Every time you think you have a handle on this album, it finds a new way to surprise, a new idea to pull, a new style to try." He called the album "confident, ambitious, and effortlessly fun."

Dom Lawson, at Metal Hammer, called the album "the perfect antidote to greyness and drudgery", "exuberant to the point of insanity" and "quite unlike anything else you will hear this year". He saw it as an evolution from Pacifisticuffs, with more emphasis on "killer hooks" and "more weirdness at every unexpected turn".

Brian Masson from Sonic Perspectives said that the album is "so vastly rich in nuances" and that it promotes "an ambitious journey that promises to blur the very existence of musical genres and their rules". He also pointed that "it does not matter how many times someone has listened to it; the listener will keep finding elements previously unnoticed." He finished his analysis calling it "a chaotic, innovative and daring experience" and "a triumph of the band's artistic will and constant risk-taking".

It was elected by PopMatters as the 4th best progressive metal album of 2021. In 2024, it was named one of the 10 "wackiest" progressive metal albums ever by Loudwire.

== Track listing ==
Swagger & Stroll Down the Rabbit Hole track listing
No.	Title	Lead vocals	Length
1.	"Sightseeing in the Apocalypse"	Daniel Håkansson	2:14
2.	"War Painted Valentine"	Håkansson, Kristin Evegård, Pontus Mantefors, Johannes Bergion, Martin Isaksson, Daniel Hedin, Johan Norbäck	4:01
3.	"Celebremos lo Inevitable" (Let Us Celebrate the Inevitable)	Evegård	4:54
4.	"Speed Dating an Arsonist"	Evegård	5:30
5.	"Jig of the Century"	Håkansson	4:32
6.	"The Sound of an Unconditional Surrender"	Evegård	5:31
7.	"Malign Monologues"	Isaksson	5:00
8.	"Out Came the Hummingbirds"	Evegård	4:21
9.	"Snake Oil Baptism"	Håkansson	4:40
10.	"Les Invulnérables" (The Invulnerables)	Håkansson, Evegård	6:02
11.	"Saluting the Reckoning"	Bergion, Evegård	4:52
12.	"The Prima Donna Gauntlet"	Håkansson	5:05
13.	"Overture to a Ceasefire"	Evegård	4:05
Total length:			60:47

== Personnel ==
Diablo Swing Orchestra

- Kristin Evegård – lead vocals, piano
- Daniel Håkansson – lead vocals, guitars, additional engineering
- Pontus Mantefors – guitars, synthesizer, FX, bouzouki, additional engineering
- Anders Johansson – bass, double bass, art direction
- Johannes Bergion – cello, vocals
- Martin Isaksson – trumpet, vocals, additional synthesizer
- Daniel Hedin – trombone, backing vocals
- Johan Norbäck – drums, percussion, backing vocals

Additional personnel

- Erika Risinger, Diana Lewtak-Isaksson – violin
- Dûsica Cvijanovic – viola
- Kristian Karlstedt – tuba
- Henrik Bergion – piano
- Bjarne Karlsson – electric organ
- Viktor Turegård – double bass
- Jakob Herrmann – bass
- Raul Lara, Lucia Viana Da Silva, Johan Reivén – percussion
- Torbjörn Tällberg Marthins, Siri Bergnéhr, Måns Ottosson, Martin Westerstrand Skans, Lina Molander, Karl Wassholm, Jesper Rådegran, Emma Hellström Svenner, Anders Bergsten, Alexander Lövmark – choir vocals
- Roberto Laghi – guitars, engineering, mixing, mastering, production
- Hans Olsson – mastering
- Jakob Herrmann – recording
