= Daniel Hakansson =

Swedish ice hockey player

Daniel Håkansson
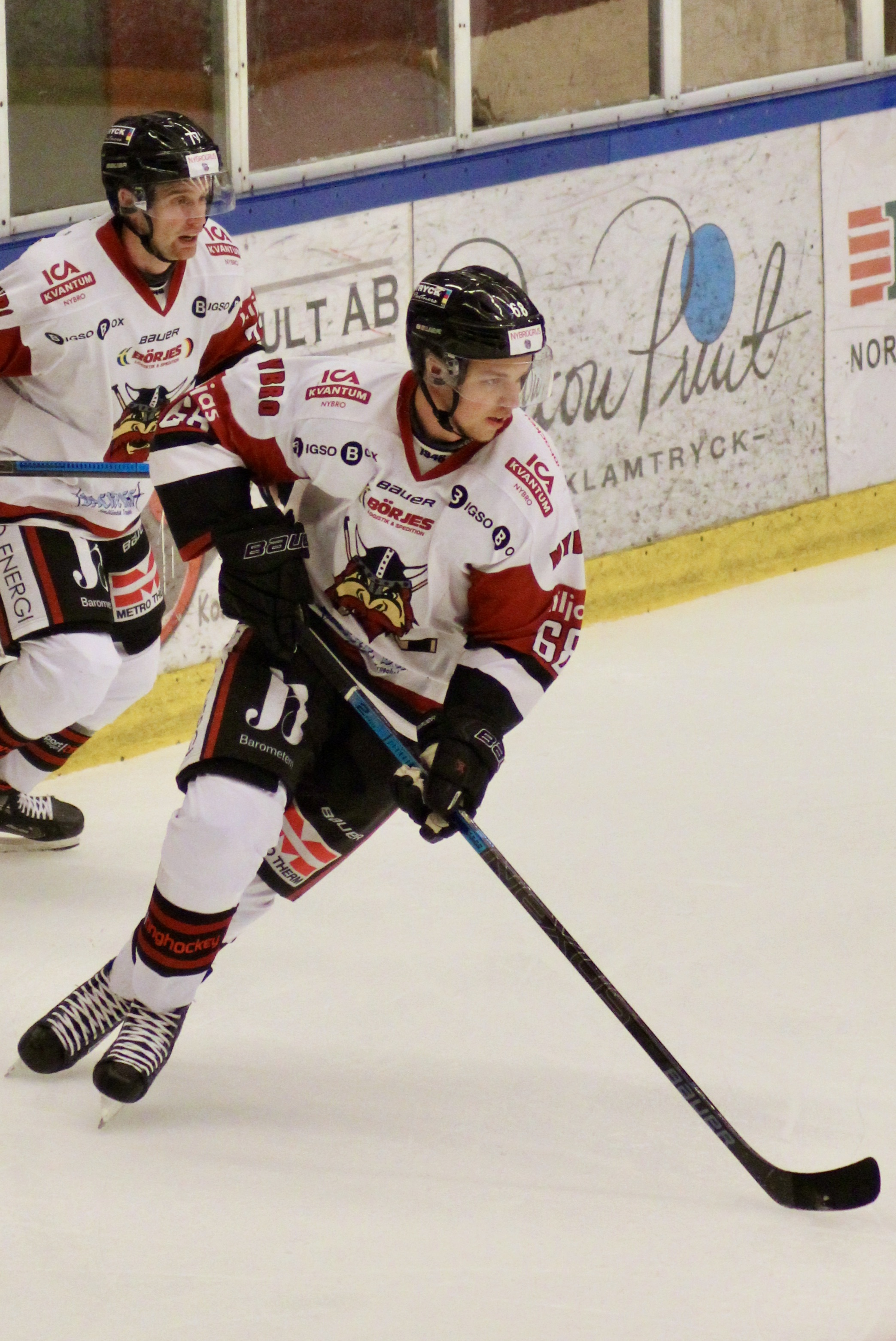
- Daniel Håkansson in a hockey game
- Born: March 13, 1996 (age 29); Linköping, Sweden
- Height: 5 ft 11 in (180 cm)
- Weight: 185 lb (84 kg; 13 st 3 lb)
- Position: Forward
- Shoots: Right
- SHL team: Linköpings HC
- NHL draft: Undrafted
- Playing career: 2014–present

For the Swedish musician, see Daniel Håkansson

Daniel Håkansson (born March 13, 1996) is a Swedish ice hockey player who played with Linköpings HC of the Swedish Hockey League.

Håkansson made his Swedish Hockey League debut playing with Linköpings HC during the 2014–15 SHL season.
