= Pin-Up Went Down =

French experimental band

- Also known as: Esthete Piggie (2006)
- Origin: Rouen, France
- Genres: Avant-garde metal; art pop; death metal; progressive metal; alternative metal (early)
- Years active: 2006–present
- Label: Ascendance Records
- Members: Alexis Damien; Nicolas Damien
- Past members: Asphodel
- Website: http://pinupwentdown.fr/

Pin-Up Went Down is a French experimental band. Although their music is mostly referred to as avant-garde metal, they describe themselves as "an experimental band blending art rock, metal, avant-garde, and pop." Pin-Up Went Down was formed as a one-man project by Alexis Damien in Rouen in 2006, who then added more members.

== History ==
Pin-Up Went Down was formed in 2006, initially as a one-man project by former Carnival in Coal and Wormfood member Alexis Damien and bearing the name Esthete Piggie. Damien was later joined by singer, writer and photographer Aurélie "Asphodel" Raidron, who had also sung for other projects such as gothic metal band Penumbra, Howdy Effect and Nowonmai, and the band changed its name to the current one later on. It appeared that Asphodel found that new name for the band.

On 28 March 2008 the duo released their first studio album, 2 Unlimited, through Ascendance Records. The album's fusion of different musical genres such as power pop, progressive metal, death metal, funk, symphonic metal and gospel music was well received by the critics, and two years later, on 28 June 2010, their second album, 342, came out also through Ascendance, further developing their unusual musical style and also being well received. In the same year, Pin-Up Went Down was joined by Alexis' brother Nicolas Damien, becoming a trio.

In 2012 the band self-released through their Bandcamp page the EP B-Sides, containing five new tracks.

As early as 2013 the band began to work on what would be their third album, Perfreaktion; however, Asphodel announced that she would be leaving the band in January 2014 to pursue other projects, and since then the album remains unreleased. Shortly after she formed the duo öOoOoOoOoOo (pronounced "chenille"; French for "caterpillar") with Baptiste Bertrand; they released their first studio album, Samen, on 21 October 2016 through Apathia Records.

Pin-Up Went Down was inactive for several years after Asphodel's departure until November 2017, when they announced a compilation album entitled Remasters, which would feature re-mastered versions of the songs of the band.

In the autumn of 2019, Alexis announces his new band, No Terror in the Bang.

== Line-up ==
=== Current members ===
- Alexis Damien – vocals, guitars, bass, keyboards, piano, drums, producer (2006–)
- Nicolas Damien – guitars, keyboards (2010–)

=== Former members ===
- Asphodel (Aurélie Raidron) – vocals (2006–2014)

== Discography ==
=== Studio albums ===
Year	Album
2008	2 Unlimited: Label: Ascendance Records; Format: CD, digital download
2010	342: Label: Ascendance Records; Format: CD, digital download

=== Extended plays ===
Year	Album
2012	B-Sides: Label: Self-released; Format: Digital download

=== Remix ===
Year	Album
2017	Remasters: Label: Self-released; Format: Digital download
