= Pacifisticuffs =

Studio album by Diablo Swing Orchestra
- Released: December 8, 2017
- Recorded: July 16 – October 9, 2016
- Studio: Big Ash (Stockholm, Sweden); Top Floor (Gothenburg, Sweden); Oral Makority (Gothenburg, Sweden); Bohus Sound (Kungälv)
- Genre: Disco; jazz; rock and roll; avant-garde metal
- Length: 44:20
- Label: Spinefarm
- Producer: Roberto Laghi

Diablo Swing Orchestra chronology
Pandora's Piñata (2012)	Pacifisticuffs (2017)	Swagger & Stroll Down the Rabbit Hole (2021)

Singles from Pacifisticuffs
- 1. "Jigsaw Hustle" Released: October 18, 2014; 2. "Knucklehugs" Released: November 3, 2017; 3. "The Age of Vulture Culture" Released: December 1, 2017

Pacifisticuffs is the fourth studio album by Swedish avant-garde metal band Diablo Swing Orchestra. It was released on December 8, 2017. It is the first album with singer Kristin Evegård and drummer Johan Norbäck.

Recorded between July and October 2016, the album was originally set for a late 2016 release, before mixing issues led to significant delays. It features a reworked version of their 2014 non-album single "Jigsaw Hustle", as well as two new singles, "Knucklehugs" released on November 3, and "The Age of Vulture Culture" released on December 1.

In the tradition of the band, Pacifisticuffs blends various genres such as heavy metal, rock, swing, progressive, and classical; influences such as jazz, bluegrass, schlager, disco, folk, gospel, blues, tango, and Latin were also noted, as was the transition to the more pop-like vocals of Evegård from the operatic style of former singer AnnLouice Lögdlund. The album received very positive reviews from music critics.

== Production and recording ==
The band announced that they started working on their next album on August 16, 2014, at the same time they announced Evegård as their new female singer.

Recordings started with producer Roberto Laghi at Gothenburg-based Top Floor Studios (together with the studio's engineer Jakob Herrmann) with drums on July 16, 2016, which were done by July 24. Recording of guitars and bass guitar started on August 3, with bass done by September 4. The recording of brass instruments started on September 18, strings on September 19, a five-person choir on September 24, and grand piano on September 27. Recording of lead vocals started on September 29, and ended on October 9, concluding the main recordings.

Mixing was supposed to be done by late October 2016, but technical difficulties led to a delaying of the album's release; the band finally announced completion of mixing and the beginning of the mastering process on January 14, 2017.

== Release and promotion ==
On February 10, 2017, they revealed the title, adding "Say it a hundred times before bed and wake up an even better person." The tracklist was revealed on March 25, and the cover art on April 22.

After an originally announced release date of October 2017, the band announced on October 14, 2017, the final release date of December 8. They also announced that two new singles will be released before the album: "Knucklehugs" on November 3 (titled "Knucklehugs (Arm Yourself with Love)" in the album), and "The Age of Vulture Culture" on December 1.

== Art and cover ==
The cover of the album was made by Sebastian Kowoll. Band member Anders Johansson was in charge of the art direction of the booklet.

According to the band, one of the main visual themes of the album is "gnarly geometry".

== Critical reception ==
Professional ratings
Review scores
Source	Rating
Angry Metal Guy	Positive
Antichrist Magazine	Very positive
Crom Magazine	7.5/10 stars
Dangerdog.com	4/5 stars
Heavy Blog is Heavy	Very positive
It Djents	Positive
Lords of Metal	98/100

The album received very positive reviews from music critics, with most praise going to its blend of different genres, uniqueness, and musical performances, particularly from newcomer Kristin Evegård and the brass section.

In a highly positive review, Lords of Metal called Pacifisticuffs "a record that’s catchier than anything this band has ever done", and called it "the prog record of the year". Antichrist Magazine gave a very positive review as well, highly praising Evegård and the album's mix of genres.

It Djents gave the album a rating of 9 out of 10, applauding its songwriting, diversity stating "if you appreciate challenging listens that are made more accessible by the blending of several different genres, masterful writing, impassioned performers, and a lot of heart, you need to hear this".

Dangerdog.com gave the album a rating of 4 out of 5, stating "Diablo Swing Orchestra has peaked in creativity and performance. So much so that, they've become predictable by example, a genre unto themselves that has gone as far as it can go. Nevertheless, if you dig Diablo Swing Orchestra, you will be completely satisfied with Pacifisticuffs".

Heavy Blog is Heavy reviewer Karlo Doroc gave high praise to the mixing, production, songwriting, and instrumental performances. He also raised Evegård, stating "whilst her voice can come across as whiny and somewhat annoying at first, it proves to be an acquired taste and one which is much more suited to the myriad of other styles found on the album. Indeed, the longer the record progresses the more she seems in her element, at home amongst the frenzied madness swirling around her".

Angry Metal Guy called the album "witty, fun and well-written", feeling that the band "always manages to merge between styles with alacrity, demonstrating excellent musicianship and compositional flare". However, he criticized the mixing and mastering of the album, calling it "claustrophobically brickwalled".

Despite being displeased with the lack of "spirit of metal" in the album, Crom Magazine gave a positive review, stating "this is not a release for the pure metalhead, it dares way too much and offers far too little metal. Pacifisticuffs is a feast for the ears for those who love energetic music that continually pushes boundaries."

== Commercial performance ==
On December 12, 2017, the album was ranked 72nd on Amazon's bestselling list for digital music.

== Track listing ==
All tracks are written by Diablo Swing Orchestra.

No.	Title	Lead vocals^{1}	Length
1.	"Knucklehugs (Arm Yourself with Love)"	Daniel Håkansson, Kristin Evegård, Pontus Mantefors	2:26
2.	"The Age of Vulture Culture"	Evegård	5:00
3.	"Superhero Jagganath"	Evegård, Martin Isaksson, Håkansson, Mantefors	5:41
4.	"Vision of the Purblind"	instrumental	1:01
5.	"Lady Clandestine Chainbreaker"	Evegård	4:50
6.	"Jigsaw Hustle" (album version)	Evegård	4:52
7.	"Pulse of the Incipient"	instrumental	0:34
8.	"Ode to the Innocent"	Evegård	3:49
9.	"Interruption"	Evegård	5:21
10.	"Cul-de-Sac Semantics"	instrumental	1:09
11.	"Karma Bonfire"	Håkansson, Evegård, Mantefors	4:14
12.	"Climbing the Eyewall"	Evegård	4:40
13.	"Porch of Perception"	instrumental	0:43
Total length:			44:20

^{1}In order of appearance.

== Personnel ==
Credits adapted from the album's liner notes.

Diablo Swing Orchestra

- Kristin Evegård – lead vocals, piano
- Daniel Håkansson – lead vocals, guitars
- Pontus Mantefors – guitars, synthesizer, banjo, vocals^{1}
- Anders Johansson – bass, backing vocals
- Johannes Bergion – cello, backing vocals
- Martin Isaksson – trumpet, piano, backing vocals
- Daniel Hedin – trombone, backing vocals
- Johan Norbäck – drums, percussion, backing vocals

Production

- Roberto Laghi – production, mixing, engineering
- Dragan Tanaskovic – mastering
- Pontus Mantefors – co-production, co-engineering
- Jakob Herrmann – engineering assistance (Top Floor Studios)
- Sebastian Kowoll – cover illustration
- Anders Johansson – art direction

Additional musicians

- Diana Lewtak - violin
- Yuki Tashiro - violin
- Max Wulfson - violin
- Nathalie Bertilsson - viola
- Viktor Turegård - double bass
- Paloma Pinto Viloria - clarinet
- Kristian Karlstedt - tuba
- Michael Osbeck - percussion
- Alexander Lövmark - backing vocals
- Ellinor Bergion - backing vocals
- Lotta Wilk - backing vocals

^{1}As a singer, Mantefors is only credited for backing vocals; however, he performs male lead vocals parts on several songs, albeit less prominently than Håkansson.
