= Hellsongs =

Swedish band

- Origin: Sweden
- Genres: Indie pop, indie folk, lounge
- Years active: 2004–
- Labels: Tapete Records, Aporia Records, Minty Fresh, Lovely Records
- Members: Anna Andersson; Maria-Terese Olsson; Petra Björnsdotter; Daniel Olsson; Kalle Karlsson
- Past members: Harriet Ohlsson; Siri Bergnéhr; Johan Bringhed; My Engström-Renman
- Website: www.hellsongs.se

Hellsongs is a three-piece acoustic band from Sweden who produce covers of famous hard rock and heavy metal songs in a very different style that they call 'lounge metal'. That means old metal classics performed with clear female vocals, soft guitars and organ.

== History ==
In 2004 the band was formed consisting of Harriet Ohlsson (lead vocals), Johan Bringhed (keyboard, vocals), and Kalle (guitar, banjo and vocals). In 2005, the Swedish national heavy metal radio show Rundgång on Sveriges Radio P3 featured Hellsongs playing a cover of Iron Maiden's "Run to the Hills" live. As Rundgång became a television show, it featured a live clip of the same act.

In 2006 the band released their debut EP "Lounge" which consists of six tracks of versions of old metal classics such as "Run to the Hills", "Jump" (originally by Van Halen) and "Orgasmatron" (originally by Motörhead). The EP got positive response and Hellsongs built a reputation as a live act in Scandinavia.

Their first full-length album, Hymns in the Key of 666 was released in early 2008 in the Nordic countries by the label Despotz Records. The album hit the Swedish charts at 9 the first week. It was later released in the UK, Germany, Austria, Switzerland, Russia, Ukraine, Greece, Japan, Australia and New Zealand.

In 2009 Siri Bergnéhr replaced Ohlsson as the lead singer, and the EP Pieces of Heaven, a Glimpse of Hell was issued. In 2010 a second album Minor Misdemeanors came out on Tapete Records and in May the band toured in Germany.

On Nov 11, 2010, Siri Bergnéhr had a minor stroke, and the remainder of their tour dates were canceled. They played a farewell concert in their hometown of Göteborg on Mar 11, 2011, and do not plan to continue the band with the same members.

In early 2012 Hellsongs released the live recording from the show with the Göteborg Symphonics, "Long Live Lounge" and once again hit the roads, now with My Engström-Renman on vocals. The rest of the year was spent recording a new album which was released as "These are evil times..." in 2013. The album consists of five covers and for the first time in band history five original songs. Bandleader Kalle opened the band to a different musical approach by using drums, electric guitars and keyboards on that record. Autumn 2013 saw the band touring Europe with main focus on Germany. Hellsongs are planning further touring in European countries like Netherlands or Italy, which will lead to play some summer festivals in 2014. In 2013, Karlsson reported that songs for a new album are being written. It is likely to contain original material as well as some cover versions.

On the 15th September 2023 they released their first new single in almost a decade – a cover of "Killing in the Name" by Rage Against the Machine. On October 25, 2024, they released their new album, The Return Of The Hellsingers.

== "Lounge" (2006) track listing ==
1. Seek and Destroy (original artist: Metallica)
2. Paranoid (original artist: Black Sabbath)
3. Breaking the Law (original artist: Judas Priest)
4. Run to the Hills (original artist: Iron Maiden)
5. Jump (original artist: Van Halen)
6. Orgasmatron (original artist: Motörhead)

=== Guest musicians ===
- David Wertén – double bass on "Paranoid" and "Jump"
- Johannes Bergion – cello on "Paranoid" and "Jump"
- Johan Reivén – percussion, add, guitar

== "Hymns in the Key of 666" (2008) track listing ==
1. The Trooper (original artist: Iron Maiden)
2. Symphony of Destruction (original artist: Megadeth)
3. Rock the Night (original artist: Europe)
4. Seasons in the Abyss (original artist: Slayer)
5. We're Not Gonna Take It (original artist: Twisted Sister)
6. Blackened (original artist: Metallica)
7. Thunderstruck (original artist: AC/DC)
8. Run to the Hills (original artist: Iron Maiden)
9. Paranoid (original artist: Black Sabbath)
10. Princess of the Night (original artist: Saxon)
11. Jump (original artist: Van Halen) (UK Exclusive track)

== "Pieces of Heaven, a Glimpse of Hell" (2009 EP) track listing ==
1. War Pigs (original artist: Black Sabbath)
2. The Evil That Men Do (original artist: Iron Maiden)
3. Losers and Winners (original artist: Accept)
4. Eagle Fly Free (original artist: Helloween)
5. I Just Want You (original artist: Ozzy Osbourne)

== "Minor Misdemeanors" (2010) track listing ==
1. Skeletons of Society (original artist: Slayer)
2. Heaven Can Wait (original artist: Iron Maiden)
3. Welcome to the Jungle (original artist: Guns N' Roses)
4. Walk (original artist: Pantera)
5. I Wanna Be Somebody (original artist: W.A.S.P.)
6. Rubicon Crossings
7. School's Out (original artist: Alice Cooper)
8. Sin City (original artist: AC/DC)
9. Youth Gone Wild (original artist: Skid Row)
10. United (original artist: Judas Priest)

== "Long Live Lounge" (2012 live album) track listing ==
=== with members of the Gothenburg Symphony Orchestra ===
1. Seek & Destroy (original artist: Metallica)
2. The Evil That Men Do (original artist: Iron Maiden)
3. War Pigs (original artist: Black Sabbath)
4. Heaven Can Wait (original artist: AC/DC)
5. Sin City (original artist: Black Sabbath)
6. Walk (original artist: Pantera)
7. Youth Gone Wild (original artist: Skid Row)
8. School's Out (original artist: Alice Cooper)
9. Run to the Hills (original artist: Iron Maiden)
10. Skeletons in Society (original artist: Slayer)
11. 10.000 Lovers (in One) (original artist: TNT)
12. I Just Want You (original artist: Ozzy Osbourne)
13. We're Not Gonna Take It (original artist: Twisted Sister)

== "These are Evil Times" (2013) track listing ==
1. Iron Man (original artist: Black Sabbath)
2. A Silence So loud (original artist: Hellsongs)
3. Engel (original artist: Rammstein)
4. Cold (original artist: At the Gates)
5. Animal Army (original artist: Hellsongs)
6. Eyemaster (original artist: Entombed)
7. Equality (original artist: Hellsongs)
8. Oh, Rosseau! (original artist: Hellsongs)
9. Stand Up & Shout (original artist: Dio)
10. Music Took My Life (original artist: Hellsongs)

== "The Return Of The Hellsingers" (2024) track listing ==
1. Just Because You Got the Power (original artist: Motörhead)
2. Use What You Got (original artist: Hellsongs)
3. Basket Case (original artist: Green Day)
4. Killing in the Name (original artist: Rage Against the Machine)
5. Friends (original artist: Hellsongs)
6. TNT (original artist: AC/DC)
7. Rather Be Dead (original artist: Refused)
8. Parental Advisory (original artist: Hellsongs)
9. Calling Them Out (original artist: Hellsongs)
