= 2 Unlimited (album) =

Studio album by Pin-Up Went Down
- Released: 28 March 2008
- Genres: Avant-garde metal; art pop; death metal; alternative metal
- Length: 42:02
- Label: Ascendance Records
- Producer: Alexis Damien

Pin-Up Went Down chronology
| 2 Unlimited (2008) | 342 (2010) |

Professional ratings
Review scores
| Source | Rating |
|---|---|
| Spirit of Metal | 17/20 link |
| AGM Magazine | Favourable link |

2 Unlimited is the debut studio album by French avant-garde metal band Pin-Up Went Down, released on 28 March 2008 through Ascendance Records.

== Track listing ==
All lyrics are written by Asphodel; all music is composed by Alexis Damien & Pin-Up Went Down.

| No. | Title | Length |
|---|---|---|
| 1. | "Intrusion" | 1:37 |
| 2. | "Esthete Piggie" | 3:19 |
| 3. | "Nearly Dead Bat Make-Up" | 3:51 |
| 4. | "Cadavre Exquis" | 4:07 |
| 5. | "Pussy Worship" | 2:23 |
| 6. | "Get Ready to Sweep" | 5:32 |
| 7. | "Yo-Yo Yes Then No" | 2:38 |
| 8. | "Only Some Shitty Chemical Stuff" | 2:44 |
| 9. | "Human Beatbox Deluxe" (instrumental) | 1:34 |
| 10. | "Feat.Me/Feat.Us" | 4:35 |
| 11. | "Be My Idol Then My Fall" | 3:06 |
| 12. | "Serie Z I" | 3:15 |
| 13. | "Serie Z II" | 3:32 |

== Critical reception ==
The album has been well received by the critics and the public alike. AGM webzine, in a positive review, has praised Asphodel's and Alexis Damien's vocals, the album's ever-changing musical direction and its lyrics, ending their review stating "it's one of the most promising first-time debut releases of all time of avant-garde music. Not joking".

It has a 17 out 20 approval rate at Spirit of Metal.

== Personnel ==
- Aurélie Raidron (Asphodel) – vocals, photography, cover art
- Alexis Damien – vocals, guitars, bass, keyboards, piano, drums, production
