= Diablo Swing Orchestra =

Swedish avant-garde metal band

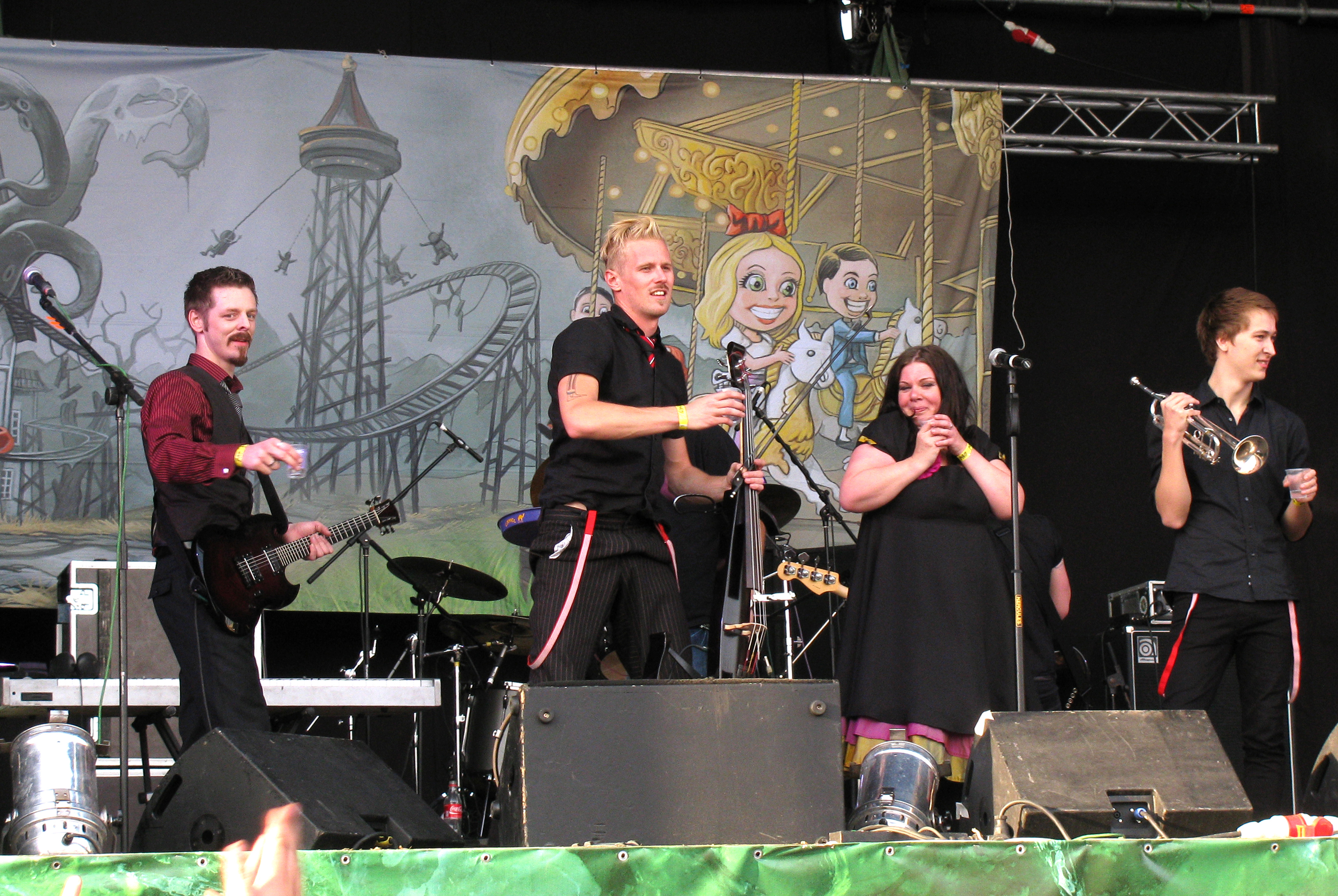
- Diablo Swing Orchestra at the Global East Rock Festival in 2010. From left to right: Pontus Mantefors, Johannes Bergion, AnnLouice Lögdlund, and Martin Isaksson.

Background information
- Origin: Sweden
- Genres: Avant-garde metal; swing; progressive metal; symphonic metal
- Years active: 2003–present
- Labels: Guillotine; Candlelight; Sonic Cathedral; Ascendance; Sensory; Spinefarm
- Members: Daniel Håkansson; Kristin Evegård; Pontus Mantefors; Andy Johansson; Johannes Bergion; Daniel Hedin; Martin Isaksson; Johan Norbäck
- Past members: Lisa Hansson; AnnLouice Lögdlund; Andreas Halvardsson; Petter Karlsson
- Website: www.diabloswing.com

Diablo Swing Orchestra, also shortened DSO, is a Swedish avant-garde metal band formed in 2003. They are known for having an eclectic sound, which fuses swing music with symphonic metal and progressive rock, among other genres. They have released five albums: The Butcher's Ballroom (2006), Sing Along Songs for the Damned & Delirious (2009), Pandora's Piñata (2012), Pacifisticuffs (2017), and Swagger & Stroll Down the Rabbit Hole (2021).

== History ==
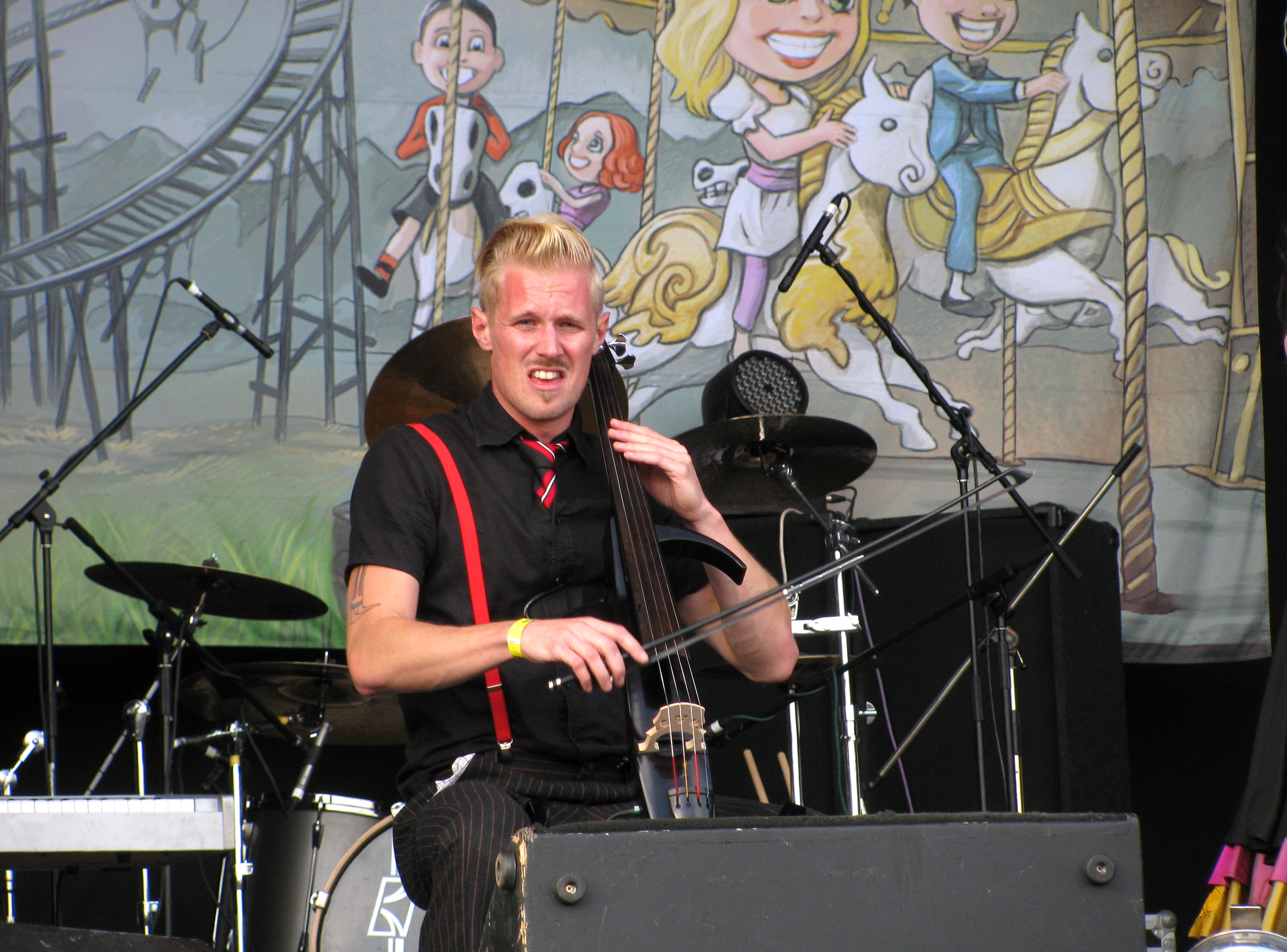
Johannes Bergion's cello is one of the defining sounds of the band.

=== Debut and The Butcher's Ballroom (2006–2009) ===
The band was created in 2003 as a sextet. The original line-up consisted of singer Lisa Hansson, guitarists Daniel Håkansson and Pontus Mantefors, bass guitarist Anders "Andy" Johansson, cellist Johannes Bergion, and drummer Andreas Halvardsson. They released their first EP, Borderline Hymns, in 2003; two years later, Hansson left the band, and was replaced by AnnLouice Lögdlund.

With Lögdlund, the band released their first album, The Butcher's Ballroom, in 2006. During recording, the band realized that some parts did not fit Lögdlund's voice; as such, Håkansson became the band's co-lead singer, with Mantefors also occasionally providing lead vocals.

Through the band's official page on Myspace, they offered free downloads of a number of tracks from their debut album in promotion of The Butcher's Ballroom. The tracks released on the page were "Heroines", "Balrog Boogie" and "Poetic Pitbull Revolutions" — the latter of which was added to the playlist months later. The full album is offered free on Jamendo as of August 2016. In July 2008 the band played at Summer Breeze Open Air in Germany and in October 2008 at Metal Female Voices Fest in Belgium.

=== Sing Along Songs for the Damned & Delirious (2009–2011) ===
In early spring 2009, the band announced that they were returning to the studio, and made a number of cryptic video blogs to document their efforts. On June 30, 2009, they announced that the cover art for the album would be made by Swedish illustrator Peter Bergting, noted for being the author of The Portent. The track "A Tap Dancer's Dilemma" was made available through the band's Myspace page on July 7, 2009. They also announced that two Special Edition prints of the album would be available to pre-order along with the regular album. Both of the Special Edition copies came in an 8 panel digipak containing the CD, a 12-page booklet and a Bonus DVD. The Special Limited Edition was restricted to only 300 orders, and came with an additional pack of postcards, vinyl sticker, and a Dog Tag embossed with the band's logo and a number between 1–300, unique to the owner. Sing Along Songs for the Damned & Delirious was released on September 21, 2009, and on October 2 the band played a special album-launch gig at The Purple Turtle club in Camden, London.

On January 18, 2010, Diablo Swing Orchestra announced that their drummer, Andreas Halvardsson, had stepped down from his role due to "personal reasons" and would be replaced by Petter Karlsson, best known for his work with Swedish metal act Therion. Diablo Swing Orchestra expected pre-production of their third album to begin towards the end of 2010. On July 17, 2010, the band played at Circo Volador, Mexico City.

On August 14, 2010, the band played at Brutal Assault Open Air in the Czech Republic with the new lineup.

In January, 2011, Sing Along Songs for the Damned & Delirious was nominated in the Eclectic Album category in The 10th Annual Independent Music Awards. The song "A Tap Dancer's Dilemma" was also nominated for the Metal/Hardcore category.

=== Pandora's Piñata (2011–2014) ===
On January 24, 2011, the band announced on Facebook that trumpeter Martin Isaksson and trombonist Daniel Hedin, who were both featured as guests on Sing Along Songs for the Damned & Delirious, had joined Diablo Swing Orchestra as full-time members.

On October 9, 2011, the band revealed their third album title: Pandora's Piñata.

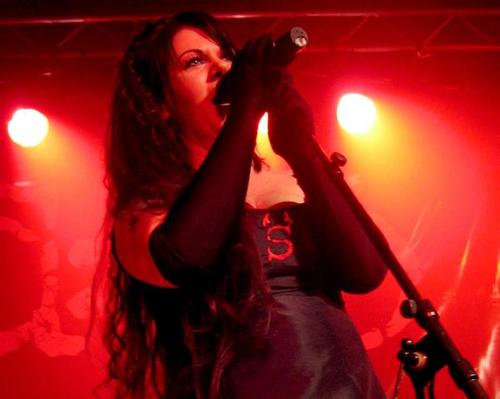
AnnLouice Lögdlund, the band's second female vocalist, was a part of the line-up from 2005 to 2014.

On March 29, 2012, the band announced on Facebook that Petter Karlsson was leaving the band; he was still featured on the upcoming album, as he had already recorded all his parts. The band publicly thanked him "for all the fun times together as well as for all the hard work he has put into the band". Karlsson stated "DSO is a band which foundation is made from a bunch of great guys, with great ideas, great enthusiasm and 100% motivation. I just feel that I can't mobilize that amount of greatness and enthusiasm, without having a bigger share of the artistic creation and in addition to limited financial gain. I just have too much other things going in my life right now. And I really want to continue working on my own projects. So therefore I leave the drum throne to someone who can put the right amount of energy into it. DSO deserve that". Johan Norbäck filled in as drummer for the rest of the ongoing tour, and eventually became a full-time member.

On April 9, 2012, the band released the new album's first single, "Voodoo Mon Amour" through their Facebook page.

Pandora's Piñata was released on May 14, 2012, in Europe, and May 22 in North America. It received rave reviews from music critics. On January 8, 2013, the band released the video from the song "Black Box Messiah".

=== Pacifisticuffs (2014–2019) ===
On August 16, 2014, the band announced that AnnLouice Lögdlund was leaving Diablo Swing Orchestra as a mutual decision, as her opera career "exceedingly has taken up more and more of her time". They also announced Kristin Evegård as her replacement, and that she would be featured on their upcoming single, "Jigsaw Hustle", which was released later that year.

They immediately started working on their next album, Pacifisticuffs, which was recorded between July and October 2016, and set for a late 2016 release; it was eventually postponed for a year due to mixing issues, and was eventually released on December 8, 2017. It was preceded by two singles, "Knucklehugs" on November 3 and "The Age of Vulture Culture" on December 1, and included a re-recorded version of "Jigsaw Hustle". It received very positive reviews from critics, with particular praise going to Evegård's performance. After the release, the band resumed touring.

On February 9, 2019, the band released a music video for the song "Superhero Jagganath" from Pacifisticuffs.

=== Swagger & Stroll Down the Rabbit Hole (2019–present) ===
The band shared that they had started working on their fifth studio album on their Facebook page on August 3, 2019, stating "12 songs in various stages of completion so far. Hoping to start recordings during the summer of 2020."

On February 21, 2020, the band stated that recording for the new album would start on May 4 in Gothenburg. Two days later, they announced the album's title, Swagger & Stroll Down the Rabbit Hole. Recording for the album concluded on August 29, with the recording of the Hammond organ parts. It would consist of 13 tracks, including "¡Celebremos lo inevitable!", the band's first song in Spanish. Following COVID-19 related setbacks, the band stated in April 2021 that mastering was the only part of the album left to complete, and that they were hoping for a release the same year. On June 15, 2021, the band announced that the first single from the album would be released in August and the second in October, with the album itself set for a November 2021 release.

Swagger & Stroll Down the Rabbit Hole was released on November 2, 2021, to critical acclaim.

== Style and influences ==
=== Music ===
Diablo Swing Orchestra is known for its eclectic sound, mixing numerous influences, most prominently from heavy metal, rock, swing, progressive, and classical, although various other influences are frequently mentioned by critics. The band's style encompasses avant-garde metal, classical, jazz, swing, progressive rock and symphonic metal.

The line-up features several instrumentalists uncommon for rock or metal bands, such as a cellist, a trumpeter, and a trombonist, while their albums often prominently feature string and brass sections.

=== Mythology ===
The origin of the name of the band is related on their website. The tongue-in-cheek back-story recounts a historically questionable ancestral story beginning in 16th-century Sweden. Supposedly, ancestors of the band members performed orchestral works in defiance of the ruling church at the time (possibly in reference to the newly installed protestant Lutheran national church, in power during the mid- and late 16th century). The orchestra was forced to go into hiding, performing in secret, with the assistance of oppressed peasants during the era. After years of performing for the pleasure of these peasants, the story claims that the church put a bounty on the performers' lives, and that this bounty was so high that the orchestra knew they would soon be captured, and thus chose to play a spectacular final show before becoming martyred to the church.

== Band members ==
Current members

- Daniel Håkansson – guitar (2003–present), lead vocals (2005–present)
- Pontus Mantefors – guitar, synthesizer, FX (2003–present), vocals (2005–present)
- Anders "Andy" Johansson – bass (2003–present)
- Johannes Bergion – cello, backing vocals (2003–present)
- Martin Isaksson – trumpet, backing vocals (2011–present; session member: 2009–2011)
- Daniel Hedin – trombone, backing vocals (2011–present; session member: 2009–2011)
- Johan Norbäck – drums, percussion, backing vocals (2012–present)
- Kristin Evegård – lead vocals, piano (2014–present)

Former members

- Lisa Hansson - lead vocals (2003–2005)
- Andreas Halvardsson – drums (2003–2010)
- AnnLouice Lögdlund – lead vocals (2005–2014)
- Petter Karlsson – drums, percussion (2010–2012)

== Discography ==
=== Studio albums ===
- The Butcher's Ballroom (2006)
- Sing Along Songs for the Damned & Delirious (2009)
- Pandora's Piñata (2012)
- Pacifisticuffs (2017)
- Swagger & Stroll Down the Rabbit Hole (2021)

=== EPs ===
- Borderline Hymns (2003)

=== Singles ===
- "Voodoo Mon Amour" (2012)
- "Jigsaw Hustle" (2014)
- "Knucklehugs" (2017)
- "The Age of Vulture Culture" (2017)
- "War Painted Valentine" (2021)
- "Celebremos Lo Inevitable" (2021)
- "Speed Dating An Arsonist" (2021)
