= Whyzdom =

French symphonic metal band

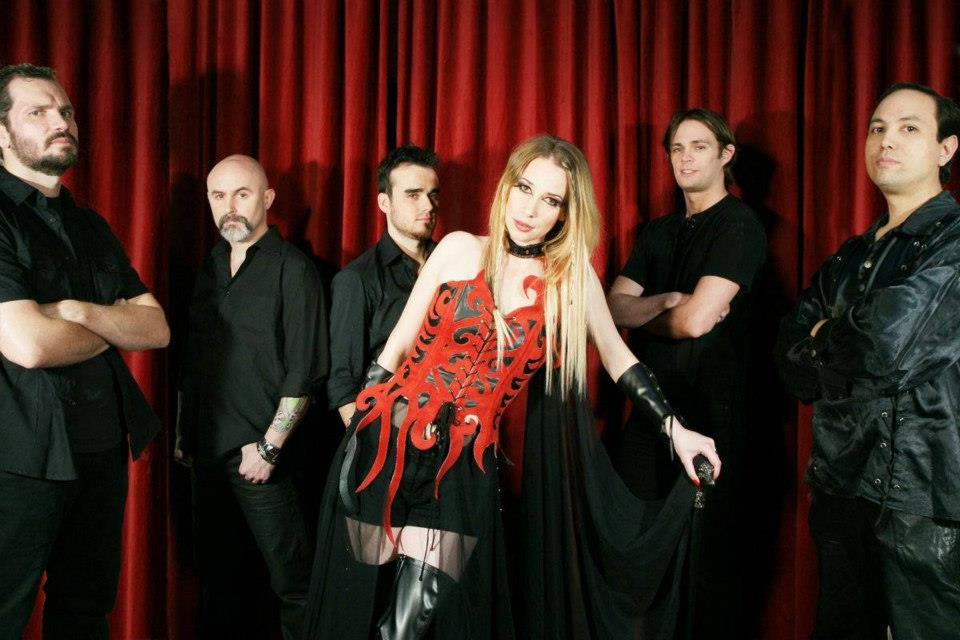
- Band's promo photo (2013)

Background information
- Origin: Paris, France
- Genres: Symphonic metal, gothic metal
- Years active: 2007–present
- Labels: Ascendance Records, Scarlet Records (2007–present)
- Members: Tristan Demurger; Nico Chaumeaux; Régis Morin; Vynce Leff; Marc Ruhlmann; Marie Rouyer
- Website: whyzdom.com

Whyzdom is a French symphonic metal band from Paris. The band was formed by Vynce Leff in 2007. As of 2021, they have released five full-length albums, one EP and one DVD.

== History ==
The band was founded in 2007 by guitarist Vynce Leff, known as a producer of several progressive rock albums for Cyclops Records. They released their first EP Daughter of the Night on 29 February 2008, less than 6 months after formation. The band has been considered the Best French Band 2008 for this EP. They have also performed at the Metal Female Voices Fest 2008 in Belgium. Whyzdom's first full-length album was named From the Brink of Infinity and was released on 21 September 2009 on Ascendance Records.

In June 2010, lead vocalist Telya Melane left the band. Lisa Middelhauve, former Xandria singer, was accepted as guest lead vocalist for the band performance at the Raismes Fest 2010, and for their concert in Paris as support for Tarja Turunen. Clementine Delauney was part of the band for concerts of 2011.

Since then, the band composed and recorded their new album Blind ? with temporary vocalist Elvyne Lorient, which was released on 30 October 2012 by the Italian Metal label Scarlet Records. The album was produced by Vynce Leff, recorded and mixed at Powermania Studio in Paris. Marie Rouyer became their new front woman in January 2013 and toured with the band to promote this album.

On 11 January 2014, it was announced that the band began recording their third album with Marie Rouyer. The album titled Symphony For A Hopeless God was released on 17 February 2015 on Scarlet Records.

A first DVD was released on 30 March 2016, based on their appearance on the main stage of the Female Metal Event 2015 in Eindhoven. The next live appearance on the stage of an international festival was at the Metal Female Voices Fest XIII on 23 October 2016, with Tarja Turunen as headliner.

The fourth album As Time Turns to Dust was released by Scarlet Records on 6 April 2018.

The line-up changes before the recording of the fifth album. Marc Ruhlmann and Tristan Demurger leave the band. Régis Morin records all the guitars of the album and Vynce becomes the bass player. The fifth album Of Wonders And Wars was released by Scarlet Records on 17 September 2021.

== Members ==
=== Current line-up ===
- Nico Chaumeaux – drums (2007–present)
- Régis Morin – guitars (2007–present)
- Vynce Leff – bass, orchestration, additional guitars (2007–present)
- Marie Rouyer – vocals (2013–present)

=== Former members ===
- Telya Melane – vocals (2007–2010)
- Xavier Corrientes – bass (2009–2015)
- Clémentine Delauney – vocals (2010–2012)
- Elvyne Lorient – vocals (2012–2013)
- Marc Ruhlmann – keyboards (2007–2019)
- Tristan Demurger – bass (2007–2009, 2015–2020)

== Discography ==
Studio albums

- From the Brink of Infinity (2009)
- Blind? (2012)
- Symphony for a Hopeless God (2015)
- As Time Turns to Dust (2018)
- Of Wonders and Wars (2021)

DVD

- Alive (2016)

EP's

- Daughter of the Night (2008)
