= The Butcher's Ballroom =

Studio album by Diablo Swing Orchestra
- Released: August 17, 2006
- Genre: Swing; flamenco; jazz; gothic metal; progressive metal; symphonic metal
- Length: 51:07

Diablo Swing Orchestra chronology
Borderline Hymns (2003)	The Butcher's Ballroom (2006)	Sing Along Songs for the Damned & Delirious (2009)

Professional ratings
Review scores
Source	Rating
Metal Storm	(9.2/10)

The Butcher's Ballroom is the debut studio album by Swedish avant-garde metal band Diablo Swing Orchestra, released in 2006. It features all four songs from their EP and disc debut Borderline Hymns, along with 9 new songs, for a total of 13 tracks divided into two acts. It is the band's first release with singer AnnLouice Lögdlund.

It received the Biggest Surprise award at the 2006 Metal Storm Awards.

== Track listing ==
All tracks are written by Daniel Håkansson, except where noted

Act I
No.	Title	Writer(s)	Length
1.	"Balrog Boogie"		3:52
2.	"Heroines"		5:21
3.	"Poetic Pitbull Revolutions"		4:52
4.	"Ragdoll Physics"		3:52
5.	"D'Angelo"		1:53
6.	"Velvet Embracer"	Håkansson, Pontus Mantefors	4:04

Act II
No.	Title	Writer(s)	Length
7.	"Gunpowder Chant"		1:50
8.	"Infralove"		4:53
9.	"Wedding March for a Bullet"		3:13
10.	"Qualms of Conscience"	P.G. Juliusson	1:15
11.	"Zodiac Virtues"	Music: Håkansson, lyrics: Anders Johansson	4:46
12.	"Porcelain Judas"	Håkansson, Mantefors	4:08
13.	"Pink Noise Waltz"		6:05
Total length:			51:07

=== Pre-gap ===
There is a pre-gap track on the album as track -1, lasting for 1:03.

=== Band members ===
- AnnLouice Lögdlund – lead vocals
- Daniel Håkansson – lead vocals, guitars, lute (setar)
- Pontus Mantefors – guitars, synthesizer, FX, vocals
- Anders "Andy" Johansson – bass
- Johannes Bergion – cello
- Andreas Halvardsson – drums

=== Additional musicians ===
- David Werthén – double bass
- Kristin Olsson – flute
- P.G. Juliusson – piano
- Tobias Wiklund – trumpet
- Emmy Lindström – violin

=== Production ===
- Pelle Saether – producer, mixed by, engineer
- Daniel Håkansson – engineer
- Pontus Mantefors – co-engineer
- Goran Finnberg – mastering
- Peter Bergting – illustrations
- Anders Johansson - art director
