= Pandora's Piñata =

Studio album by Diablo Swing Orchestra
- Released: May 14, 2012 (Europe); May 22, 2012 (North America)
- Genre: Swing; jazz; classical; Latin; progressive rock; avant-garde metal
- Length: 51:46
- Label: Candlelight Records
- Producer: Roberto Laghi

Diablo Swing Orchestra chronology
Sing Along Songs for the Damned & Delirious (2009)	Pandora's Piñata (2012)	Pacifisticuffs (2017)

Singles from Pandora's Piñata
- 1. "Voodoo Mon Amour" Released: April 9, 2012

Pandora's Piñata is the third studio album by Swedish avant-garde metal band Diablo Swing Orchestra. It was released on May 14, 2012, in Europe by Candlelight Records and on May 22, 2012, in North America by Sensory Records.

It is the last album with the singer AnnLouice Lögdlund and the only album with Petter Karlsson on drums; he left the band earlier that year, after recording his parts. It is also the first album with the trombonist Daniel Hedin and the trumpeter Martin Isaksson as full-time members, with Pandora's Piñata being the first album with the band being an octet.

The band's first single, "Voodoo Mon Amour", was released before the album. An official video for "Black Box Messiah" was also released. All songs are credited to Diablo Swing Orchestra.

== Reception ==
Professional ratings
Review scores
Source	Rating
About.com	4.5/5 stars
Allmusic	4/5 stars
Dangerdog	5/5 stars
Heavy Blog... Is Heavy	5/5 stars
Lords of Metal	9.5/10 stars
Metal Blast	5/5 stars
Metal Underground	3.5/5 stars
Rock n Reel Reviews	4.5/5 stars
Sputnikmusic	4.5/5 stars

Pandora's Piñata was acclaimed by critics. Sputnikmusic gave the album a "superb" rating of 4.5 out of 5 (same as the two previous albums), calling it "A sprawling tour de force that moves seamlessly between metallic technicality and full-throttle symphonic grandeur". Heavy Blog... Is Heavy gave Pandora's Pinata the maximum rating, praising "the variation that this album provides" and stating, "No track sounds the same, because each track shows off a different side of DSO."

About.com called it "Wickedly catchy, breathtakingly original and downright good clean". Dangerdog wrote, "Pandora's Pinata is immensely creative and devastatingly entertaining," and gave the album a 5 out of 5.

On a less positive review, Metal Underground thought that the band "Continues their off-beat avant-garde metal style, fantastic female vocals, oozes creativity", but criticized the "Lack of prominent male/female vocal interplay, not as heavy or catchy as their last album". The reviewer the album a rating of 3.5 out of 5, writing, "Slightly less compelling than their previous albums, but still a rousing interpretation of avant-garde metal."

== Track listing ==
All tracks are written by Diablo Swing Orchestra.

No.	Title	Lead vocals	Length
1.	"Voodoo Mon Amour"	AnnLouice Lögdlund, Johannes Bergion, Daniel Håkansson	4:31
2.	"Guerrilla Laments"	Lögdlund, Håkansson	4:55
3.	"Kevlar Sweethearts"	Lögdlund	4:24
4.	"How to Organize a Lynch Mob"	instrumental	0:53
5.	"Black Box Messiah"	Bergion, Martin Isaksson, Daniel Hedin _{(all three pitch-shifted)}, Lögdlund, Håkansson	2:57
6.	"Exit Strategy of a Wrecking Ball"	Håkansson	6:01
7.	"Aurora"	Lögdlund	5:05
8.	"Mass Rapture"	Håkansson	6:03
9.	"Honey Trap Aftermath"	Håkansson	4:15
10.	"Of Kali ma Calibre"	Lögdlund	4:25
11.	"Justice for Saint Mary"	Håkansson	8:17

== Personnel ==
=== Band members ===
Teaser image of the album

- Daniel Håkansson – lead vocals, guitar
- Annlouice Loegdlund – lead vocals
- Pontus Mantefors – vocals, guitar, synthesizer, sound effects
- Anders Johansson – Bass guitar
- Johannes Bergion – cello, backing vocals
- Daniel Hedin – trombone, backing vocals
- Martin Isaksson – trumpet, backing vocals
- Petter Karlsson – drums, percussion

=== Session musicians ===
- Diana Lewtak – violin
- Erika Risinger – violin, viola
- Emilia Wareborn – viola
- Michael Carlqvist – double bass
- Elisabeth Jansson – horns
- Wictor Lind – timpani, percussion
- Anna Melander – flute
- Oskar Reuter – mandolin
- Lucy Rugman – clarinet
- Ekaterina Skidanova – oboe

=== Production ===
- Roberto Laghi – production, engineering
- Pontus Mantefors – engineering
- Peter Bergting – cover art
- Anders Johansson – artwork
