= Josefov Fortress =

18th century fort in the Czech Republic

Coordinates: 50°20′21.4″N 15°55′48.8″E

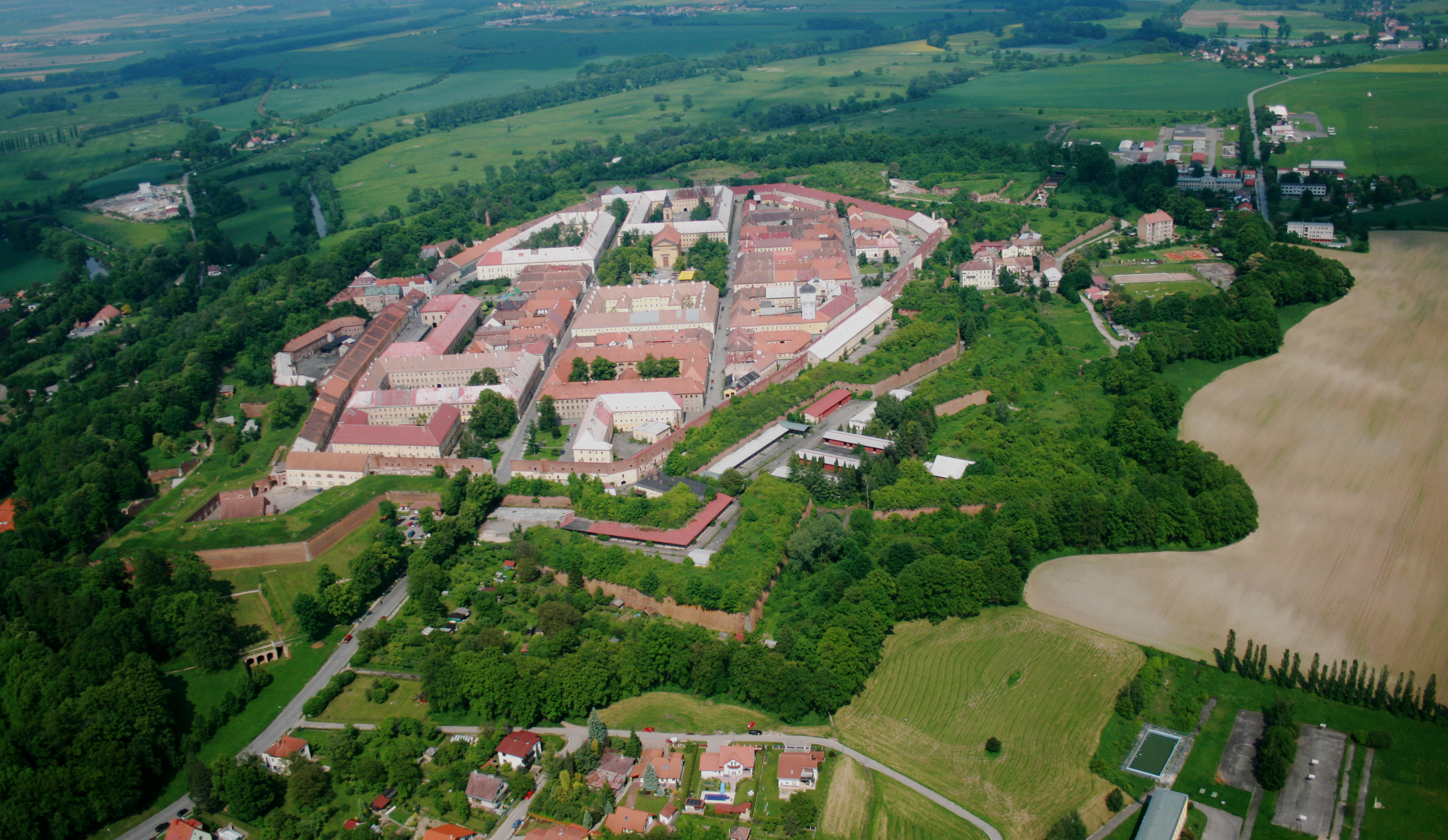
Aerial view of Josefov Fortress

Josefov Fortress (Czech: Pevnost Josefov, German: Josefstadt or Josephstadt) is a large historic defence complex of 18th-century military architecture in Jaroměř in the Hradec Králové Region of the Czech Republic. It was built between 1780 and 1787. Together with Terezín fortress, it was built for protection against attacks from Prussia, but its military importance, like other such fortresses built across Europe, was minimal as decisive battles were often fought elsewhere. In 1948 it became part of the town of Jaroměř.

== Design ==
Map of Josefstadt with the plan for the future fortress (around 1780). The text indicates that the construction deviates from the plan.

After the coronation of Emperor Joseph II, new fortifications began to be built for the defence of the northern border of the empire. The defence of Moravia was entrusted to Olomouc, which was fortified by powerful forts. When the work was completed, the fortification of Hradec Králové commenced between 1766 and 1788. The emperor Joseph II himself had the Josefov Fortress built around the area of Plesy, near the town of Jaroměř.

Designed by the French architect Claude Benoît Duhamel de Querlonde and fortified by octagonal-shaped, bastion-like brick walls extending over 289 hectares, the fortress is a system of fortifications in the form of an amphitheatre with extensive three-storey deep underground corridors formed in cretaceous rocks, and running through a labyrinth of 45 kilometers, the likes of which cannot be found anywhere else in Europe. It had three distinct sections – the main fortress with its residential and public function, the lower Crown fortress with a fortified island, and a forward redoubt in Brdce fortress. The town had four gates. The dominant part of the whole Josefov Fortress is the Empire Church, which was built between 1805 and 1810. It was designed by Heinrich Hatzinger, Julius D’Andreis and Franz Joseph Fohmann. Before that, there was a fountain in the same place, which was made by the Czech J. Malinský in 1817.

The Josefov fortress was originally named Ples, and only later, in 1793, was it renamed Josefov. In 1948 the fortress town was incorporated into Jaroměř and today it is an urban monument reservation preserving 18th-century military building techniques and classicist urbanism.

== Today ==
Over the years, the fortress has been converted into a residential district. The biggest extreme metal music festival in Central Europe, Brutal Assault, takes place here each August, with the music stages built against the outer walls. Metalheads from all over Europe occupy the fortress for four days each year.

== Gallery ==
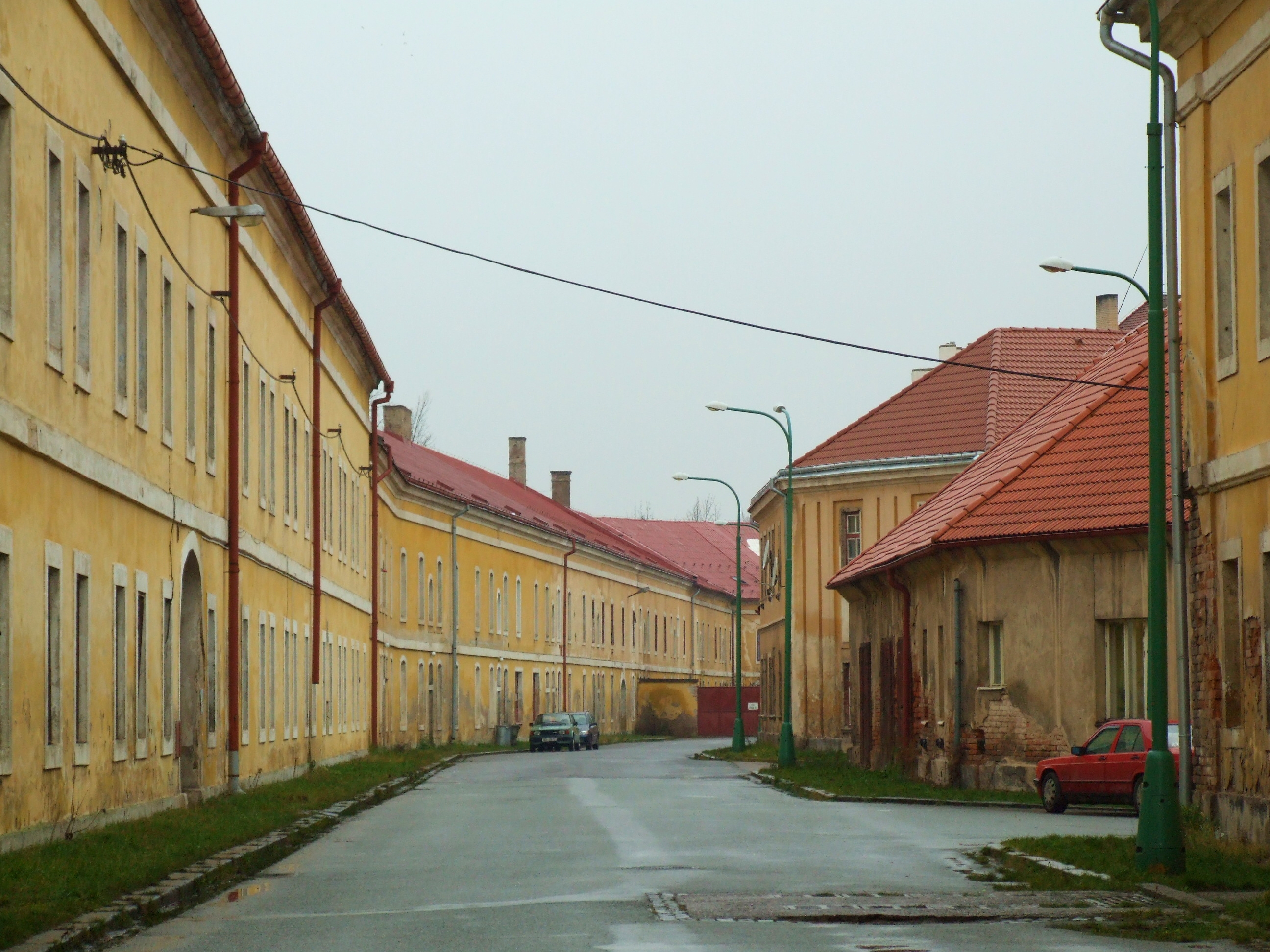
Houses in the site of Josefov fortress

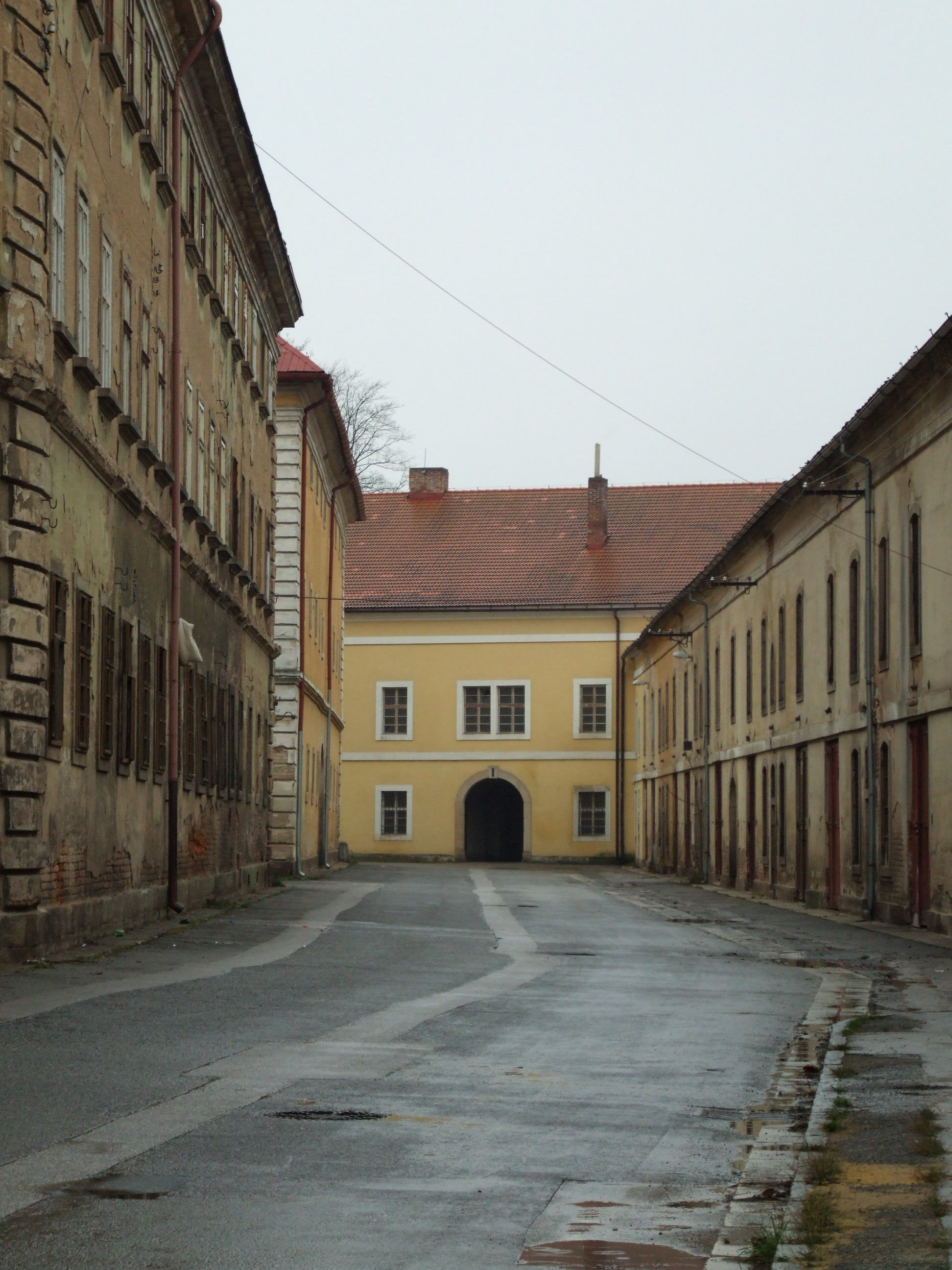
Josefov Fortress

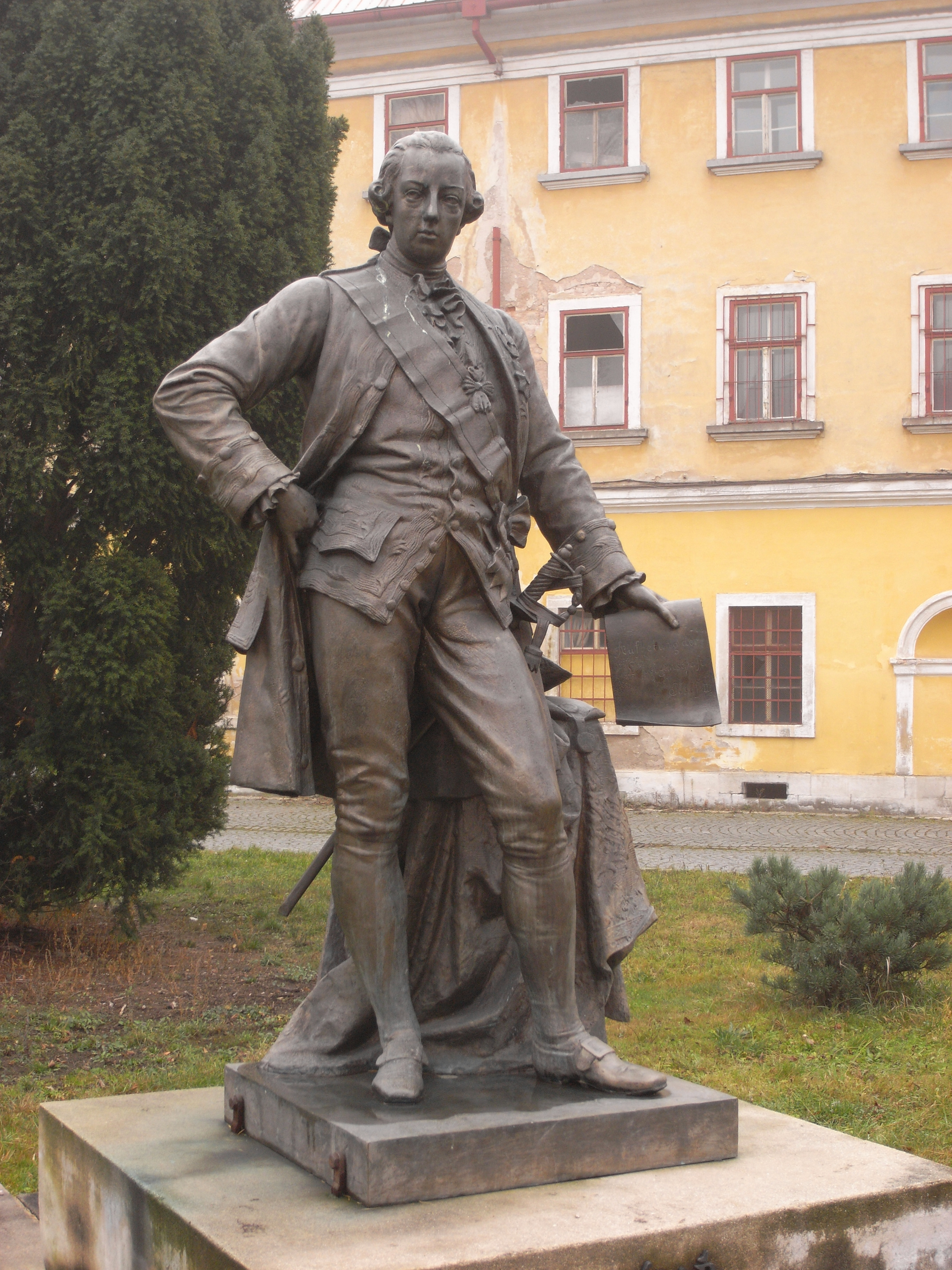
Statue of Emperor Joseph II

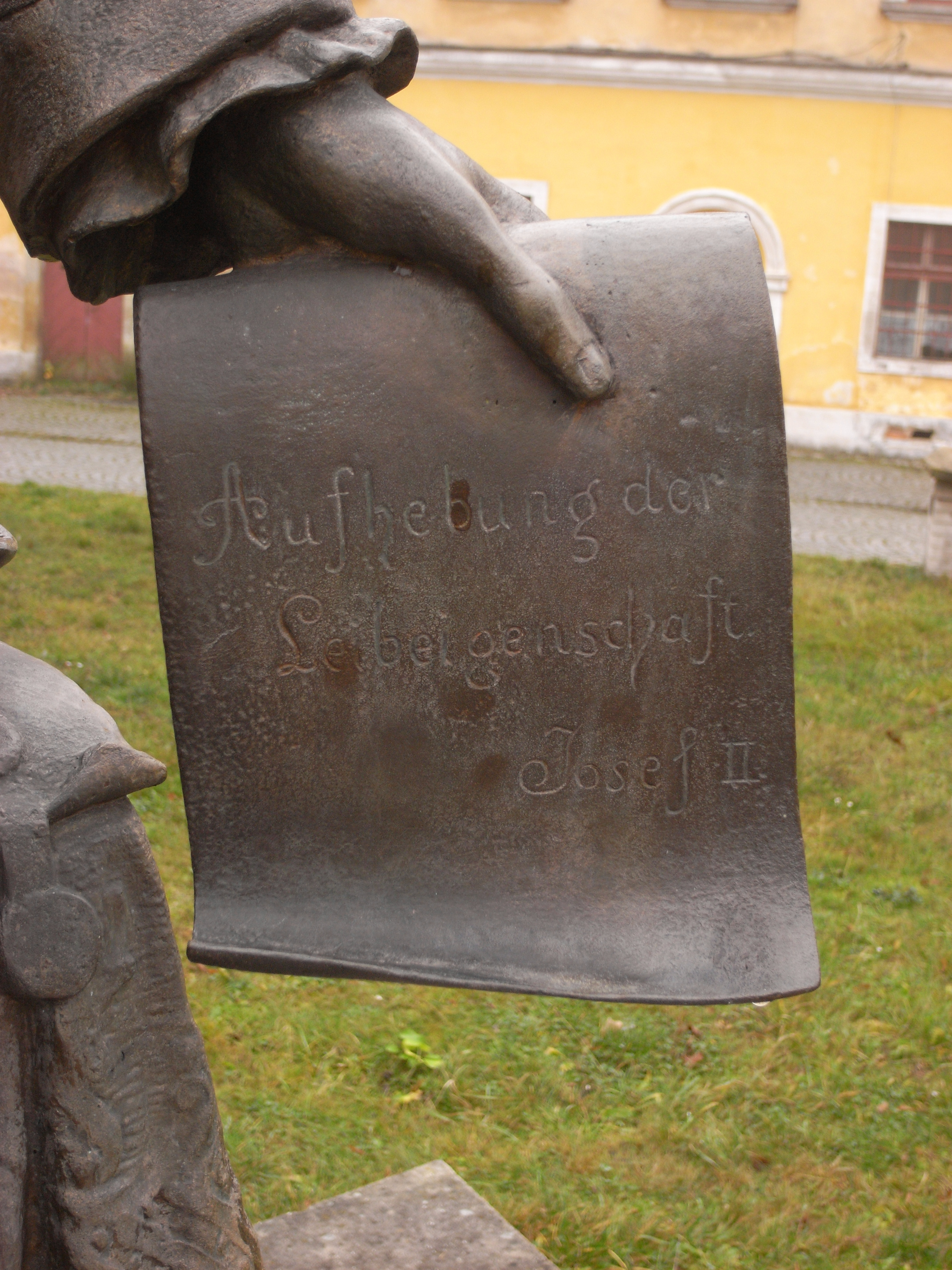
Detail of decree on the statue of Emperor Joseph II
