= Manes (band) =

Band from Trondheim, Norway

- Also known as: Perifa (1991–1992); Obscuro (1992–1993); Manii (2011–present)
- Origin: Trondheim, Norway
- Genres: Black metal Avant-garde metal, trip hop
- Years active: 1993–1999; 2002–2011, 2011–present (as Manii), 2013–present
- Labels: Hammerheart code666 Aural Music; Kyrck Productions; Candlelight; Debemur Morti Productions; Terratur Possessions(as Manii)
- Members: See below

Manes is a band from Trondheim, Norway, formed in 1993. They started out as a two-piece band composed of Sargatanas and Cernunnus (or Cern). They have been signed to Candlelight Records, Hammerheart Records and the Italian experimental label Code666. The band's earlier works, up to and including Under Ein Blodraud Maane (1999), were somewhat atypical Norwegian black metal and were highly lauded by fans of the genre. However, as of Vilosophe (2003) and How the World Came to an End (2007) the band completely changed its sound to a hybrid of jazz, trip hop, electronica and metal with clean sung vocals and many progressive overtones. In spite of being highly acclaimed by critics this subsequent change of direction alienated most of their original fan base.

In 2011, the band released an official statement on their web site that they were calling it quits due to health and family reasons. They resurfaced the same year, changing name to Manii and returning to make black metal. Manii released Kollaps in 2013., Sinnets irrganger in 2018 and Innerst i mørket in 2023.

Manes also returned (independently from Manii) as an electronical project in 2013 when they signed a deal with Debemur Morti Productions and following year, 2014, released their fourth album, Be All End All, as well as an LP re-release of the debut Under Ein Blodraud Maane and compilation album of obscurities and rare material called Teeth, Toes and other trinkets. In 2018, Manes announced their comeback with a new album, Slow Motion Death Sequence.

== History ==
=== Under Ein Blodraud Maane: 1992–1999 ===
Manes was started by Cernunnus in 1992 as a side-project of Atrox, a band he was playing in back then. A few experimental lineups, Manes settled as a two-man band, with Sargatanas doing the vocal duties and Cernunnus doing the rest of the instruments. The first demo: Maanens Natt (1993), the second Ned i Stillheten (1994) and the third: Til Kongens Grav de Døde Vandrer (1995). The debut album Under Ein Blodraud Maane was released by the Dutch label Hammerheart Records. After that album, Cernunnus took a long break from music.

=== Vilosophe to How the World Came to an End: 2002–2011 ===
Manes resurfaced in 2002, with new line-up, new musical style and new appearance. Their second album, Vilosophe, was released in 2003 by the Italian label Code666, sublabel of Aural Music, to an unprepared audience. This abrupt change and unexpected behaviour have followed the band in everything they have done since. Manes played some gigs and festivals like Inferno Metal Festival in 2004, Hole in the Sky, Southern Discomfort and Quart Festival, and shared a stage with bands like Isis, Katatonia, Red Harvest and Theatre of Tragedy among others to finalize their commitment to Aural Music. Manes released the [view] EP in 2006 as an intermezzo between albums. Rune Hoemsnes left the band briefly in 2006, but finished laying drumming parts for the band next album. Tor-Arne Helgesen was hired for the corresponding tour and subsequent recording sessions. In 2007, Manes released the web ep Deprooted and the album How the World Came to an End via the British label Candlelight Records. This album further explored more the musical styles of Vilosophe and saw Manes as a more creative collective collaborating with a group of guests. During the recording sessions for this album, Manes were attempting to produce and record the following album Be All End All, but the album ended up being released only in 2014. The reviews for How the World Came to an End were good, and the band gained a lot of attention, but no concerts were played in the wake of the release. The band took a time off, and 15 different Manes web albums were released in 2011, among these Overheated, Deep North and Roman Shower.

=== Name change, Kollaps to Innerst i mørket: 2011–present ===
In 2011, the band returned, changing the name to Manii and with the original vocalist Sargatanas back. Manii announced their first album Kollaps in December 2011 and released the album on 9 January 2013. Later on, they are signed to Terratur Possessions. They re-recorded two tracks from old Manes with the new drummer Bornyhake and released them on 1 September 2015 as Skuggeheimen. Manii released their second album Sinnets irrganger, which included the aforementioned two tracks as bonus tracks, on 4 May 2018. They returned after 5 years in 2023 with the single track album Innerst i mørket, V. Einride (best known from Whoredom Rife) replacing Bornyhake on drums.

=== Manes return, Be All End All to Slow Motion Death Sequence: 2013–present ===
In spring 2013 the band resurfaced with new creative urge. The standstill was due to factors like health and family, and the associated Manes members were devoted to other bands and projects, many of whom were collaboration between two or more of band members. In the summer of 2013 Manes released a new track “Blanket of Ashes” online, and announced that the album Be All End All finally will be released following a compilation album of obscurities and rare material called Teeth, Toes and other trinkets, both via the French label Debemur Morti. Since November 2015, the band has been recording their fifth studio record according to their Facebook page. In early 2018, Manes announced a new album, Slow Motion Death Sequence.

== Members ==
=== Manes ===
==== Current members ====
- Tor-Helge Skei – guitars, keyboards, programming, electronics (1993–1999, 2002–2011, 2013–present)
- Eivind Fjøseide – guitars (2002–2011, 2013–present), synthesizer (2018, 2023–present)
- Torstein Parelius – bass (2002–2011, 2013–present)
- Rune Hoemsnes – drums, percussion (2002–2006, 2013–present), backing vocals, synthesizer (2018)
- Asgeir Hatlen – vocals (2002–2007, 2016–2019, 2020–2023, 2024–present)

==== Former members ====
- Sargatanas – vocals (1993–1999)
- Tommy Sebastian Halseth – vocals (2002–2003)
- Emil Sporsheim – vocals (2005–2006)
- Tor-Arne Helgesen – drums (2006–2011)
- Marita Hellem – vocals (2023–2024)

==== Live members ====
- Emil Sporsheim – lead vocals (2004–2007)
- Tommy Sebastian Halseth – backing vocals (2004–2007)
- Tom Engelsøy – vocals (2014–2016)
- Rune Folgerø – vocals (2015–2016)

==== Guest members/close collaborators ====
- Asgeir Hatlen – vocals (2014, 2020)
- Rune Folgerø – vocals (2014, 2018)
- Tom Engelsøy – vocals (2018, 2020)
- Ana Carolina Skaret – vocals (2018, 2020)
- Anna Murphy – vocals (2018, 2020)
- Tor Arne Helgesen – drums (2018)

=== Manii ===
==== Current members ====
- Cernunnus – guitars, bass, keyboards (2011–present), drum programming (2011–2013)
- Sargatanas – vocals (2011–present)
- V. Einride – drums (?–present)

==== Former members ====
- Vindd – Guitars (2013)
- Bornyhake – Drums, additional guitars (2015-?)

== Discography ==
=== Manes ===
==== Studio albums ====
- Under Ein Blodraud Maane (1999) - Hammerheart Records
- Vilosophe (2003) - Code666 Records
- How the World Came to an End (2007) - Candlelight Records
- Be All End All (2014) - Debemur Morti Productions
- Slow Motion Death Sequence (2018) - Debemur Morti Productions

==== Demos and EPs ====
- Maanens Natt (1993)
- Ned i Stillheten (1994)
- Til Kongens Grav de Døde Vandrer (1995)
- [view] (2006)
- Reinvention - remixes (2008)
- Pro-Gnosis-Diabolis 1993 / Solve Et Coagula - split with other Manes (2009)
- Solve et Coagula (2009)
- Vntrve (2014)

==== Singles ====
- Deeprooted (2007)
- Young Skeleton (2020)
- Submerged (2024)
- Submerged / Fallen (2024)
- Endetidstegn (Jørgen Meyer Remix) (2024)
- Scion (Throes Of Dawn Remix) (2024)

==== Compilation albums ====
- 1993-1994 (2005)
- Svarte Skoger (2006)
- How The World... - Preprod #1 (2009)
- New Stuff #1 (2010)
- #418 :: The Plot Thickens (2011)
- #417 :: Disorient (2011)
- #416 :: The Map Is Not the Land (2011)
- #415 :: Thin Air (2011)
- #414 :: Nil (2011)
- #413 :: Funeral Home (2011)
- #412 :: Deep North (2011)
- #411 :: Marbled Skin (2011)
- #410 :: All You Can Eat (2011)
- #409 :: Overheated (2011)
- #408 :: Hardened (2011)
- #407 :: Olympian (2011)
- #406 :: The True Name of God (2011)
- #405 :: Vardøger (2011)
- #404 :: Roman Shower (2011)
- #403 :: New Shit Has Come to Light (2011)
- Be All End All v0.0.1 [Beta Beta] - reissue of New Stuff #1 (2011)
- Teeth, Toes and other Trinkets (2014)
- Ihjelbrent Skatt (2022)
- Saeculum II (Vilosophe Remnants) (2023)
- Slow Motion Death Sequence Remixed (2024)

=== Manii ===
==== Studio albums ====
- Kollaps (2013), Avantgarde Music
- Sinnets irrganger (2018), Terratur Possessions
- Innerst i mørket (2023), Terratur Possessions

==== EPs ====
- Skuggeheimen (2015), Terratur Possessions
