= 342 Endymion =

Main-belt asteroid

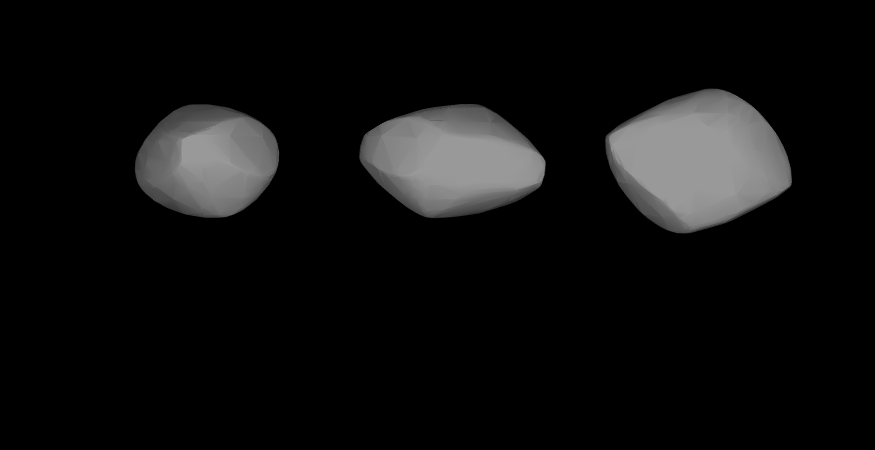
- Lightcurve-base 3D-model of 342 Endymion.

Discovery
- Discovered by: Max Wolf
- Discovery date: 17 October 1892

Designations
- Pronunciation: /ɛnˈdɪmiən/
- Named after: Endymion
- Alternative designations: 1892 K
- Minor planet category: Main belt König · Bower

Orbital characteristics
- Epoch 31 July 2016 (JD 2457600.5)
- Uncertainty parameter 0
- Observation arc: 115.38 yr (42141 d)
- Aphelion: 2.89687 AU (433.366 Gm)
- Perihelion: 2.24079 AU (335.217 Gm)
- Semi-major axis: 2.56883 AU (384.291 Gm)
- Eccentricity: 0.12770
- Orbital period (sidereal): 4.12 yr (1503.8 d)
- Mean anomaly: 335.858°
- Mean motion: 0° 14^{m} 21.793^{s} / day
- Inclination: 7.34850°
- Longitude of ascending node: 232.690°
- Argument of perihelion: 224.708°

Physical characteristics
- Dimensions: 60.63±2.8 km
- Synodic rotation period: 6.319 h (0.2633 d)
- Geometric albedo: 0.0393±0.004
- Absolute magnitude (H): 10.22

342 Endymion is a large Main belt asteroid. It was discovered by Max Wolf on 17 October 1892 in Heidelberg. It was the first asteroid to receive the name of a male god.
