= Johannes Bergion =

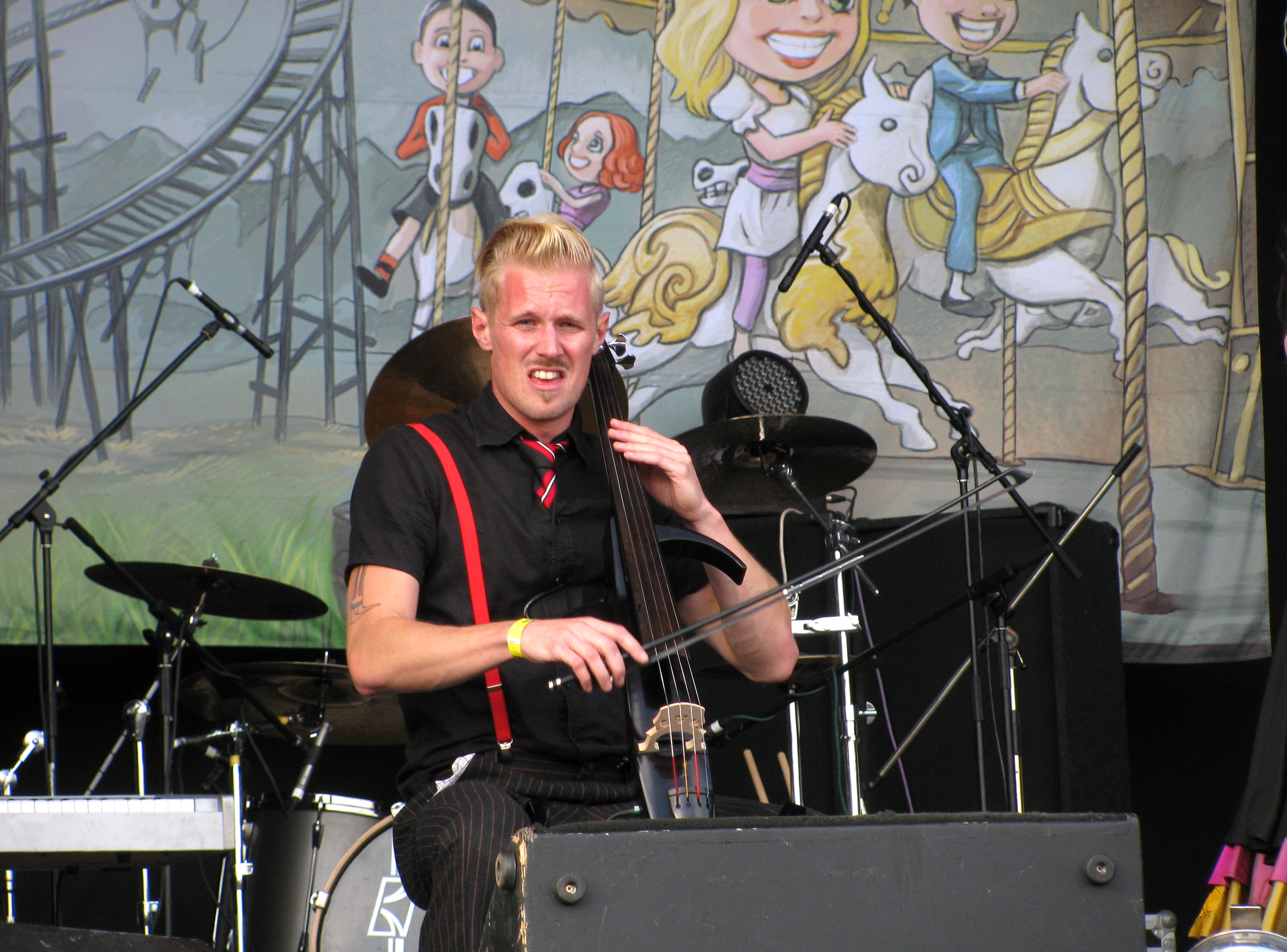
- Johannes Bergion performing with Diablo Swing Orchestra at the Global East Rock Festival in 2010.

Background information
- Origin: Söderköping, Sweden
- Genres: Avant-garde metal
- Instruments: Cello, vocals

Johannes Bergion is a Swedish cellist, songwriter and backing vocalist, most known for being one of the founding members of avant-garde metal band Diablo Swing Orchestra. He also played cello in various Hellsongs albums, and in the In Flames album Sounds of a Playground Fading.

Bergion is credited as one of the writers/composers of Diablo Swing Orchestra. However, according to Daniel Håkansson, the songs are mostly written by Håkansson and Pontus Mantefors.

== Discography ==
=== Diablo Swing Orchestra ===
==== Studio albums ====
- The Butcher's Ballroom (2006)
- Sing Along Songs for the Damned & Delirious (2009)
- Pandora's Piñata (2012)
- Pacifisticuffs (2017)

==== EPs ====
- Borderline Hymns (2003)

==== Singles ====
- "Voodoo Mon Amour" (2012)

=== Hellsongs ===
- Lounge (2006)
- Hymns in the Key of 666 (2008)
- Minor Misdemeanors (2010)

=== As guest musician ===
- Oh, Harry - Arena Rock (2010) in "Shift Happens"
- In Flames - Sounds of a Playground Fading (2011) in "A New Dawn"
