= Ascendance Records =

- Genre: Metal
- Country of origin: UK

Ascendance Records is an independent record label based in the UK founded by Lee Barrett (former bassist of Extreme Noise Terror and To-Mera, founder of Candlelight Records) and Sam Grant (writer, promoter, broadcaster and interviewer for Sonic Cathedral online Magazine) since June 2007.

== Artists ==
Ascendance Records specialises in Female-fronted metal, having bands such as Amberian Dawn, Akphaezya, Diablo Swing Orchestra, Ebony Ark, Flowing Tears, Pin-Up Went Down, Ram-Zet, Stolen Babies, Unexpect, Witchbreed and Whyzdom on its roster.

== See also ==
- List of record labels
