= Carnival in Coal =

French metal band

- Origin: Amiens, France
- Genres: Extreme metal Avant-garde metal
- Years active: 1995–2007, 2014–present
- Label: Equilibre Music
- Members: Arno Strobl; Axel Wursthorn
- Website: www.carnivalincoal.com

Carnival in Coal is an extreme metal/avant-garde metal band from France. Founded in 1995, the band mixed death metal, black metal and other extreme metal genres with disco and pop.

== History ==
Carnival In Coal signed to and released their debut album through the now-defunct French indie label War On Majors Records. The band released two more albums through another French based independent Metal label, Season of Mist, and later signed a multi-album deal to Earache Records and their Elitist Records sub-label. The only album to come from this deal was 2005's Collection Prestige.

The band played its first live show in April 2006 at the Killer Fest in Chaulnes, France, and went on to play several dates across Europe, including festivals like Hellfest Summer Open Air in France and Brutal Assault in Czech Republic.

== Line-up ==
=== Band members ===
- Arno Strobl – vocals
- Axel Wursthorn – all instruments

=== Live members ===
- Arno Strobl – vocals
- Axel Wursthorn – bass and samples
- Alexis Damien – drums (2006-2007)
- Romain Caron – guitar and backing vocals
- Pierre Antonik – guitar
- Julien Cathalo – keyboard and samples
- Frédéric Leclercq – guitar
- El Worm – guitar
- Timmy Zecevic – keyboard and samples
- Nicolas Minier – guitar

== Discography ==
- Sramik (demo, 1997)
- Vivalavida (1999)
- French Cancan (1999)
- Fear Not (2001)
- Collection Prestige (2005)
