= Tifa =

Tifa or Tiffa may refer to:

- Mladen Vojičić Tifa, Bosnian singer, lead vocalist of Bijelo Dugme from 1984 to 1986
- Tifa Lockhart, character from Final Fantasy VII
- Trade and Investment Framework Agreement
- Tiffa Adill, a character in After War Gundam X
- Tiffania Westwood, a character in The Familiar of Zero light novel and anime series
- Tifa, the name of a number of places in Jaraguá do Sul, Brazil
- Tifa (drum), a traditional musical instrument in Indonesia and Papua New Guinea
- Trucks Involved in Fatal Accidents, see Work-related road safety in the United States

== See also ==
- List of Wikipedia articles beginning with "Tifa"
- Tiffany (given name)
- Tyfa, a type of foundry in former Czechoslovakia
- Typha, genus of cattail plants
- Tipha (disambiguation)
- Teefa in Trouble, film
