= Tisis argyrophaea =

Scientific classification
- Kingdom: Animalia
- Phylum: Arthropoda
- Class: Insecta
- Order: Lepidoptera
- Family: Lecithoceridae
- Genus: Tisis
- Species: T. argyrophaea

Binomial name
- Tisis argyrophaea Meyrick, 1910

Species of moth

Tisis argyrophaea is a moth in the family Lecithoceridae. It was described by Edward Meyrick in 1910. It is found on Borneo.

The wingspan is about 21 mm. The forewings are orange with the base narrowly fuscous, towards the costa silvery metallic. There is a silvery-metallic violet-fuscous spot on the costa at one-third, and one on the dorsum opposite. A large violet-fuscous patch occupies the apical two-fifths of the wing except along the costa, where the ground colour forms a streak reaching to near the top, with the margin suffused. The hindwings are fuscous, slightly purple tinged.
