= Tisis seclusella =

Scientific classification
- Kingdom: Animalia
- Phylum: Arthropoda
- Class: Insecta
- Order: Lepidoptera
- Family: Lecithoceridae
- Genus: Tisis
- Species: T. seclusella

Binomial name
- Tisis seclusella (Walker, 1864)

Synonyms
- Tonosa seclusella Walker, 1864

Species of moth

Tisis seclusella is a moth in the family Lecithoceridae. It was described by Francis Walker in 1864. It is found on Borneo.

Adults are ferruginous brown, without markings. The hindwings have a luteous (muddy-yellow) penicillate (with a tuft of fine hairs) streak along the costa.
