= Tisis polychlora =

Scientific classification
- Kingdom: Animalia
- Phylum: Arthropoda
- Class: Insecta
- Order: Lepidoptera
- Family: Lecithoceridae
- Genus: Tisis
- Species: T. polychlora

Binomial name
- Tisis polychlora Meyrick, 1926

Species of moth

Tisis polychlora is a moth in the family Lecithoceridae. It was described by Edward Meyrick in 1926. It is found on Borneo.

The wingspan is about 23 mm. The forewings are rather dark grey, with pale ochreous markings. The basal area to one-third of the costa and two-thirds of the dorsum is suffused with pale ochreous sprinkles except towards the base of the costa. There is a very oblique suffused fascia from two-fifths of the costa to the end of the cell, where a suffused costal streak runs to near the apex, and suffused lines along all the veins posteriorly. The hindwings are pale yellow ochreous, with modified hairs scales in the disc and towards the costa and a suffused grey streak from the base along the dorsum and termen to two-thirds of the wings.
