= Tisis luteella =

Scientific classification
- Kingdom: Animalia
- Phylum: Arthropoda
- Class: Insecta
- Order: Lepidoptera
- Family: Lecithoceridae
- Genus: Tisis
- Species: T. luteella

Binomial name
- Tisis luteella (Snellen, 1903)

Synonyms
- Cacogamia luteella Snellen, 1903

Species of moth

Tisis luteella is a moth in the family Lecithoceridae. It was described by Snellen in 1903. It is found on Java and Sabah.

The wingspan is 17–24 mm. The forewings are clay-yellow, with dark crosslines in the cell. The hindwings are clay colored.
