= Tisis yasudai =

Scientific classification
- Kingdom: Animalia
- Phylum: Arthropoda
- Clade: Pancrustacea
- Class: Insecta
- Order: Lepidoptera
- Family: Lecithoceridae
- Genus: Tisis
- Species: T. yasudai

Binomial name
- Tisis yasudai Park, 2003

Species of moth

Tisis yasudai is a moth in the family Lecithoceridae. It was described by Kyu-Tek Park in 2003. It is found on Sabah, Malaysia's easternmost state,

The wingspan is about 17.5 mm for males and 17–19 mm for females. The forewings are dark brown at the base. The hindwings are grey.

== Etymology ==
The species is named for the Japanese lepidopterist T. Yasuda.
