= Tisis bicolorella =

Scientific classification
- Kingdom: Animalia
- Phylum: Arthropoda
- Class: Insecta
- Order: Lepidoptera
- Family: Lecithoceridae
- Genus: Tisis
- Species: T. bicolorella

Binomial name
- Tisis bicolorella Walker, 1864

Species of moth

Tisis bicolorella is a moth in the family Lecithoceridae. It was described by Francis Walker in 1864. It is found on Borneo.

The wingspan is 17–19 mm. Adults are brownish cinereous, with the wings brownish cinereous beneath. The forewings are bluish green for more than half the length from the base, gilded from there to the tips. The hindwings are aeneous fawn colour.
