= Tisis cerambycina =

Scientific classification
- Kingdom: Animalia
- Phylum: Arthropoda
- Class: Insecta
- Order: Lepidoptera
- Family: Lecithoceridae
- Genus: Tisis
- Species: T. cerambycina

Binomial name
- Tisis cerambycina Meyrick, 1926

Species of moth

Tisis cerambycina is a moth in the family Lecithoceridae. It was described by Edward Meyrick in 1926. It is found on Borneo.
