= Tisis nemophorella =

Scientific classification
- Kingdom: Animalia
- Phylum: Arthropoda
- Class: Insecta
- Order: Lepidoptera
- Family: Lecithoceridae
- Genus: Tisis
- Species: T. nemophorella

Binomial name
- Tisis nemophorella (Walker, 1864)

Synonyms
- Togia nemophorella Walker, 1864

Species of moth

Tisis nemophorella is a moth in the family Lecithoceridae. It was described by Francis Walker in 1864. It is found on Borneo.

Adults are cupreous, the forewings chalybeous (steel blue), with a cupreous band before the middle, and with a luteous (muddy-yellow) slightly oblique cupreous-bordered band beyond the middle.
