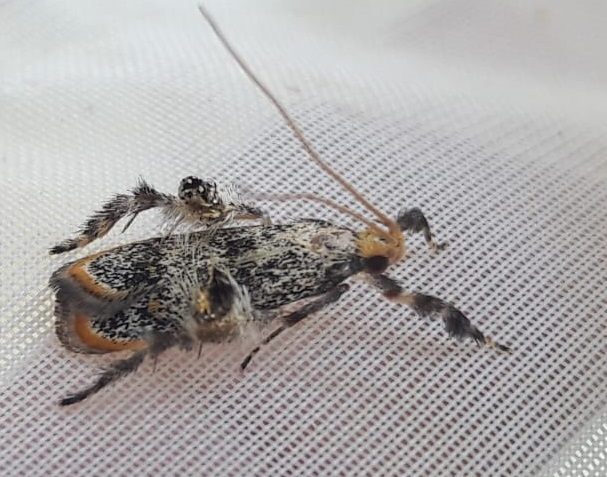

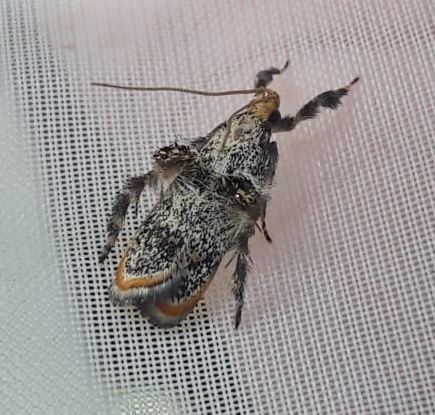

Scientific classification
- Domain: Eukaryota
- Kingdom: Animalia
- Phylum: Arthropoda
- Class: Insecta
- Order: Lepidoptera
- Family: Lecithoceridae
- Genus: Tisis
- Species: T. mendicella

Binomial name
- Tisis mendicella (Walker, 1864)

Synonyms
- Decuaria mendicella Walker, 1864; Timyra toreutis Meyrick, 1908

= Tisis mendicella =

Species of moth

Tisis mendicella is a moth in the family Lecithoceridae. It was described by Francis Walker in 1864. It is found in Sri Lanka.

The wingspan is 17–20 millimetres (0.67–0.79 in). The forewings are dark fuscous with two or three short whitish streaks from the base and transverse lines of white irroration (sprinkling) at one-fourth and one-third, partly marked with orange. There are three orange longitudinal streaks from about the middle to three-fourths, the third furcate (forked) posteriorly, separated by streaks of purplish-leaden suffusion. Veins 3, 4, and 7 to 10 are marked more or less completely with white streaks, 5 and 6 with orange streaks and there is a short white streak along the costa near the apex. The hindwings are dark fuscous, with a subdorsal groove enclosing a pencil of whitish-ochreous hairs.
