= Tisis plautata =

Scientific classification
- Kingdom: Animalia
- Phylum: Arthropoda
- Clade: Pancrustacea
- Class: Insecta
- Order: Lepidoptera
- Family: Lecithoceridae
- Genus: Tisis
- Species: T. plautata

Binomial name
- Tisis plautata C. S. Wu, 1998

Species of moth

Tisis plautata is a moth in the family Lecithoceridae. It was described by Chun-Sheng Wu in 1998. It is found in Indonesia (western Java).
