= Tisis frimensis =

Scientific classification
- Kingdom: Animalia
- Phylum: Arthropoda
- Clade: Pancrustacea
- Class: Insecta
- Order: Lepidoptera
- Family: Lecithoceridae
- Genus: Tisis
- Species: T. frimensis

Binomial name
- Tisis frimensis Park, 2005

Species of moth

Tisis frimensis is a moth in the family Lecithoceridae. It was described by Kyu-Tek Park in 2005. It is found on Sabah in Malaysia.
