= Tisis polemarcha =

Scientific classification
- Domain: Eukaryota
- Kingdom: Animalia
- Phylum: Arthropoda
- Class: Insecta
- Order: Lepidoptera
- Family: Lecithoceridae
- Genus: Tisis
- Species: T. polemarcha

Binomial name
- Tisis polemarcha Meyrick, 1926

Species of moth

Tisis polemarcha is a moth in the family Lecithoceridae. It was described by Edward Meyrick in 1926. It is found on Borneo and Sabah.

The wingspan is about 26 mm. The forewings are light orange with thick costal and dorsal and slender median dark grey streaks from the base to one-fifth, the costal marked with blue leaden metallic, sending a curved undefined fascia of dark grey suffusion mixed with blue-leaden-metallic scales to near the dorsum before the middle. There is a broad dark grey streak narrowed posteriorly along the costa from two-fifths to the apex, almost confluent with the preceding, leaving the costal edge yellow. A dark grey wedge-shaped blotch extends from the disc at three-fourths to the lower part of the termen, the apex anterior. The hindwings are dark grey, the discal area from near the base to near termen, and the costal area suffused ochreous whitish, a series of long erect ochreous-whitish hairs along the submedian fold and a short tuft of ochreous-whitish hairs on the costal gland at one-third.
