= Tisis asterias =

Scientific classification
- Kingdom: Animalia
- Phylum: Arthropoda
- Clade: Pancrustacea
- Class: Insecta
- Order: Lepidoptera
- Family: Lecithoceridae
- Genus: Tisis
- Species: T. asterias

Binomial name
- Tisis asterias Park, 2003

Species of moth

Tisis asterias is a moth in the family Lecithoceridae. It was described by Kyu-Tek Park in 2003. It is found in Thailand.

The wingspan is about 17 mm for males and 15 mm for females.
