= Tisis aurifasciata =

Scientific classification
- Kingdom: Animalia
- Phylum: Arthropoda
- Clade: Pancrustacea
- Class: Insecta
- Order: Lepidoptera
- Family: Lecithoceridae
- Genus: Tisis
- Species: T. aurifasciata

Binomial name
- Tisis aurifasciata Park, 2007

Species of moth

Tisis aurifasciata is a moth in the family Lecithoceridae. It was described by Kyu-Tek Park in 2007. It is found on Sumatra, Indonesia.
