= Náchod =

- Town
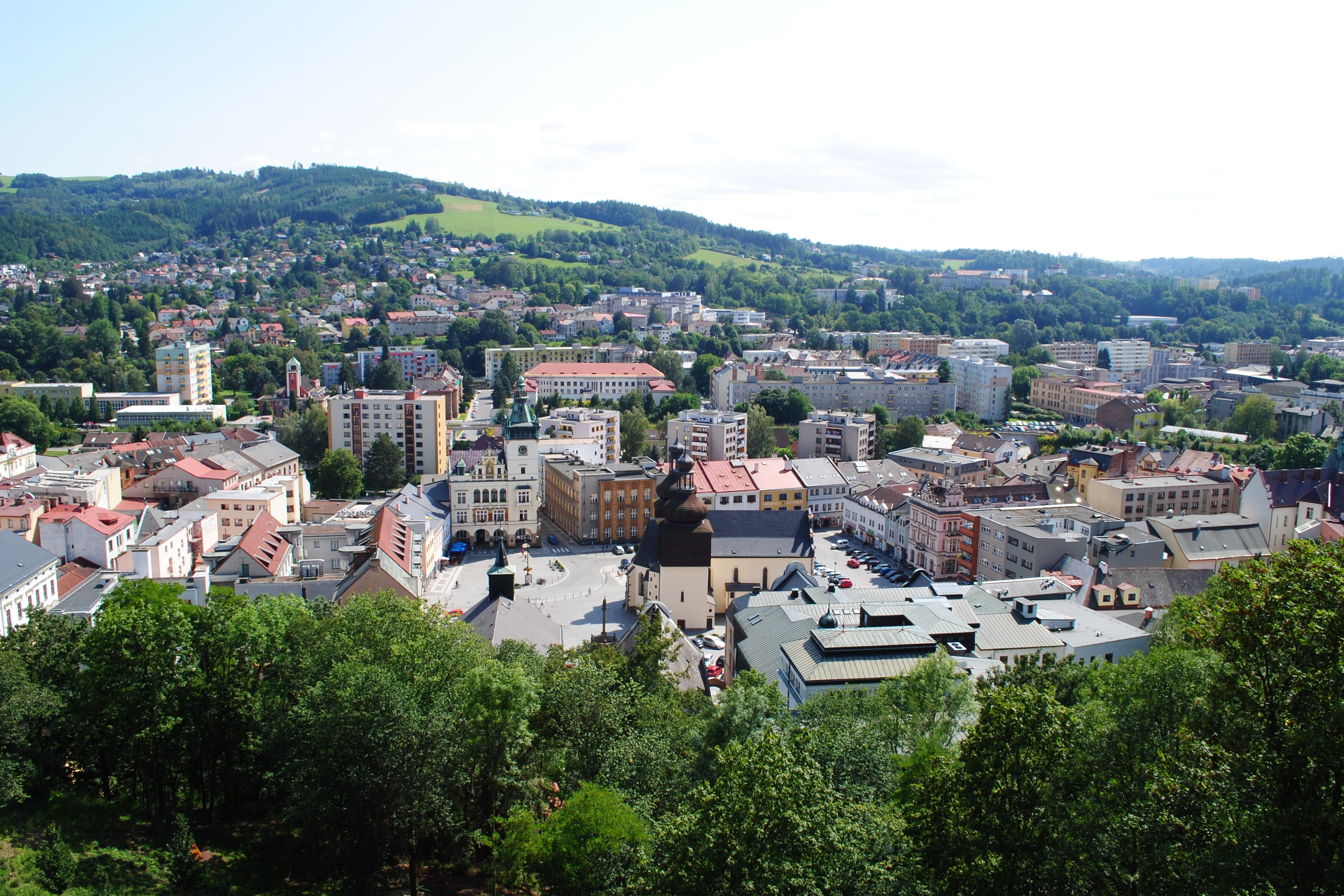
- View from the castle

- Flag Coat of arms

- Location in the Czech Republic
- Coordinates: 50°25′1″N 16°9′47″E
- Country: Czech Republic
- Region: Hradec Králové
- District: Náchod
- First mentioned: 1254

Government
  - Mayor: Jan Birke

Area
  - Total: 33.34 km^{2} (12.87 sq mi)
- Elevation: 346 m (1,135 ft)

Population (2026-01-01)
  - Total: 19,649
  - Density: 589.4/km^{2} (1,526/sq mi)
- Time zone: UTC+1 (CET)
  - Summer (DST): UTC+2 (CEST)
- Postal code: 547 01
- Website: www.mestonachod.cz

Náchod (Czech pronunciation: [ˈnaːxot]; German: Nachod) is a town in the Hradec Králové Region of the Czech Republic. It has about 20,000 inhabitants. The town is located on the Metuje River in the Orlické Foothills, on the border with Poland. It is known both as a tourist destination and a centre of industry.

Náchod was founded in the 13th century. The most important monument is the Náchod Castle, protected as a national cultural monument. The historic town centre with the castle complex is well preserved and is protected as an urban monument zone.

== Administrative division ==
Náchod consists of ten municipal parts (in brackets population according to the 2021 census):

- Náchod (12,128)
- Babí (635)
- Běloves (1,306)
- Bražec (257)
- Dobrošov (113)
- Jizbice (246)
- Lipí (402)
- Malé Poříčí (246)
- Pavlišov (194)
- Staré Město nad Metují (3,534)

== Etymology ==
The name is derived from the Old Czech word náchod, i.e. 'place of arrival' (here meaning "the place where one arrives into the land" in connection with the land gate that was located here).

== Geography ==
Náchod is located about 31 kilometres (19 mi) northeast of Hradec Králové, on the border with Poland. It lies in the northern tip of the Orlické Foothills. The highest point is the hill Malinová hora at 637 m (2,090 ft) above sea level. The town is situated in the valley of the Metuje River. There are two fishponds in the northwestern part of the municipal territory: Podborný and Odkaliště.

== History ==
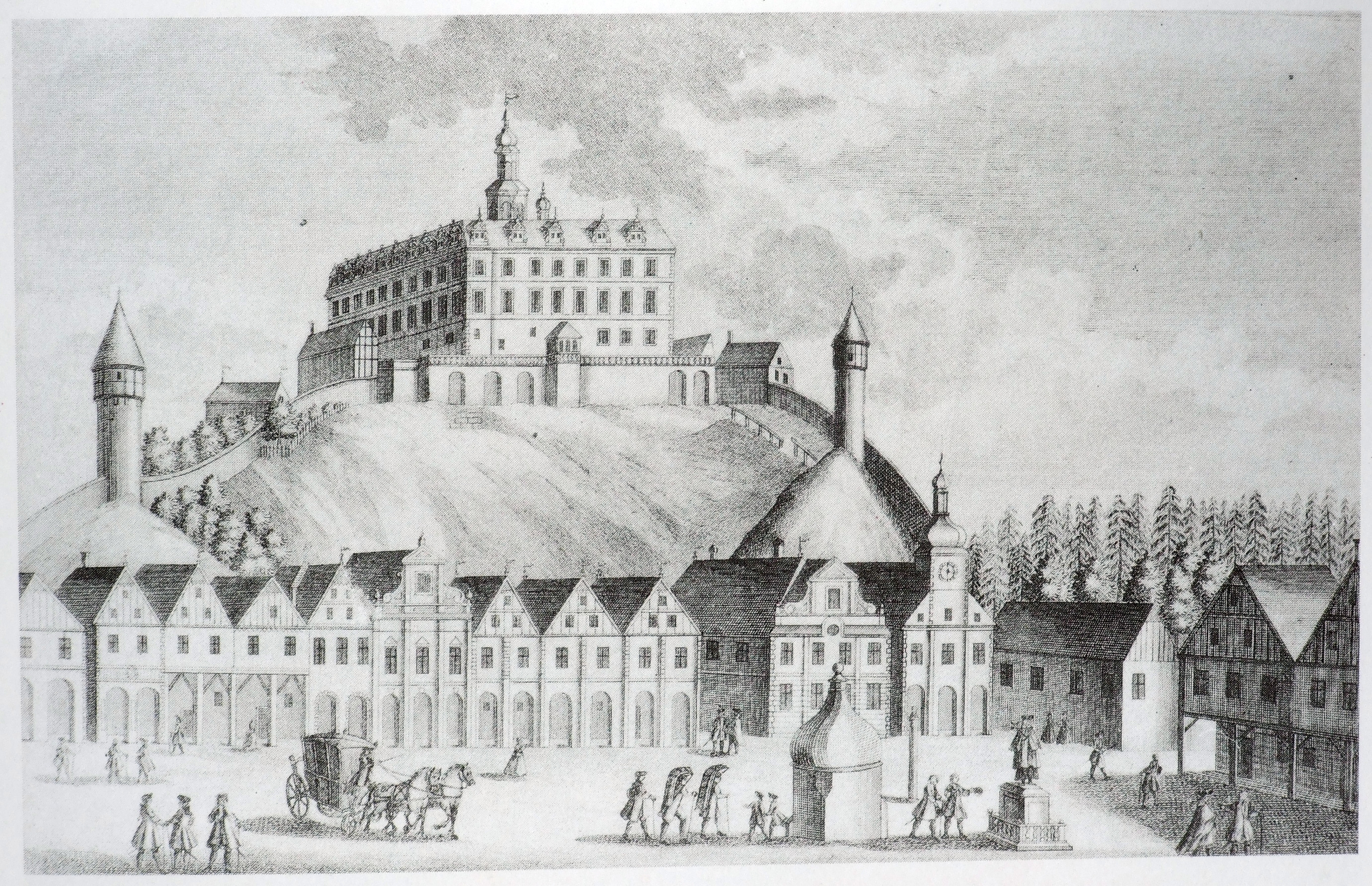
Náchod square and castle in c. 1740

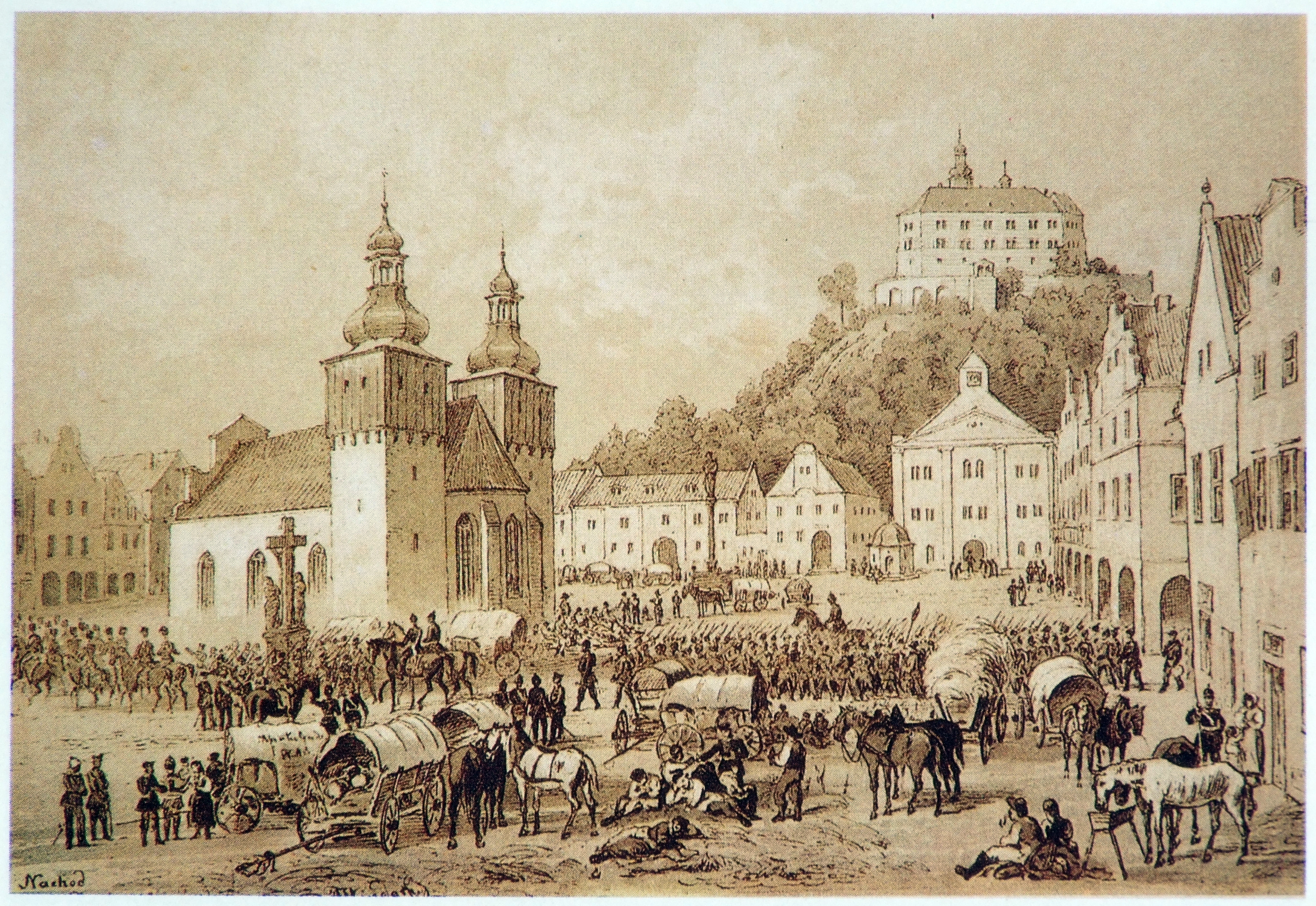
Main square in 1866

The predecessor of Náchod was a settlement called Branka (meaning 'gate') near the land gate, located in the area today known as Staré Město ('Old Town') with the Church of Saint John the Baptist from the 13th century. Knight Hron of Načeradec founded a castle and then a town below the castle in the mid-13th century to protect the territory through which an old trade route from Prague to Kłodzko Land passed. The first written mention of Náchod is from 1254. The town was fortified with walls and bastions in the early 14th century.

Owners of the castle included kings John of Bohemia and George of Poděbrady. During the Hussite Wars, Náchod was conquered and owned by the Hussites. In 1437, it was captured by the celebrated robber knight Jan Kolda of Žampach, and retaken by George of Poděbrady in 1456 and included in his estates. Over time the castle grew into a large fortress. The powerful and rich Smiřický family acquired the estate in 1544 and had the castle rebuilt into a comfortable Renaissance residence; the town also flourished at the time, and was endowed with privileges almost equal to royal towns.

The Thirty Years' War put an end to the prosperity of the town. The properties of the Smiřický family, who had been loyal to King Frederick V, were seized by the imperial treasury after the Battle of the White Mountain and sold to the House of Trčka of Lípa in 1623. When Adam Erdmann Trčka of Lípa was assassinated together with his brother-in-law Albrecht von Wallenstein in Cheb in 1634, the domain was seized again and donated by the Emperor to his general Ottavio Piccolomini, later Duke of Amalfi. Thus the town fell into the hands of the Italian family, suffered from military operations and forced re-Catholicisation, but also enjoyed some development: the castle was grandly rebuilt in the Baroque style and the first street in the town was paved in 1638. After the fire of 1663, a new town hall was built and the Church of St. Lawrence on the square was rebuilt. The burgesses were also granted some privileges.

The Piccolominis extinct in 1783, the Náchod domain was inherited by the Desfours family and sold in 1792 to Duke Peter von Biron of Courland and Sagan, who established a theatre on the castle and significantly improved overall the level of cultural life in Náchod.

When the duke died in 1800, his eldest daughter Katharina Wilhelmine (1781–1839) inherited Náchod and the Duchy of Sagan. After her death, the princes of Schaumburg-Lippe (in today's Lower Saxony) bought Náchod and held the castle until 1945, though the domain system was abolished in the reform of 1849 and succeeded by public administration districts.

Beside the district administration and district court, the reform brought about an elected town council, fast development of industry and schools, and a building boom that included the Neo-Renaissance town hall and Art Nouveau theatre. The railway was also built and from 1882, when two factories were established, the textile industry quickly developed. Náchod became the cotton industry centre of Austria-Hungary. At the beginning of the 20th century, Náchod was nicknamed "Manchester of the east".

Extensive border fortifications were built in and around Náchod in the years prior to World War II to protect the territory of Czechoslovakia against the threat of German invasion. During World War II, the town was occupied by Germany. Náchod had virtually no ethnic German population.

== Demographics ==
Historical population

Year	Pop.	±%
1869	6,757	—
1880	7,057	+4.4%
1890	10,481	+48.5%
1900	15,004	+43.2%
1910	18,128	+20.8%

Year	Pop.	±%
1921	16,807	−7.3%
1930	18,535	+10.3%
1950	18,562	+0.1%
1961	18,846	+1.5%
1970	19,729	+4.7%

Year	Pop.	±%
1980	20,713	+5.0%
1991	20,712	−0.0%
2001	21,400	+3.3%
2011	20,394	−4.7%
2021	19,061	−6.5%

Source: Censuses

== Economy ==
The service sector is the major employer in Náchod. Revenues from tourism are crucial for the economy of the town and the whole region. The largest employer based in the town is the hospital. The largest industrial companies are ATAS elektromotory Náchod and Ametek elektromotory, both producers of electric motors, and the rubber factory of Rubena Náchod.

The tradition of textile industry is held by the last surviving cotton-weaving mill Bartoň – textil, founded in 1867. Long tradition has also the Primátor Brewery, founded in 1872.

== Transport ==
On the Czech–Polish border is the road border crossing Náchod / Kudowa Słone. The I/33 road (part of the European route E67) connects Hradec Králové with Náchod and the border crossing. The second main road that runs through Náchod is I/14 (specifically its section from Trutnov to Ústí nad Orlicí).

Náchod is located on the railway lines Broumov–Starkoč and Týniště nad Orlicí–Teplice nad Metují. The town is served by three stations and stops: Náchod, Náchod zastávka and Náchod-Běloves.

== Sights ==
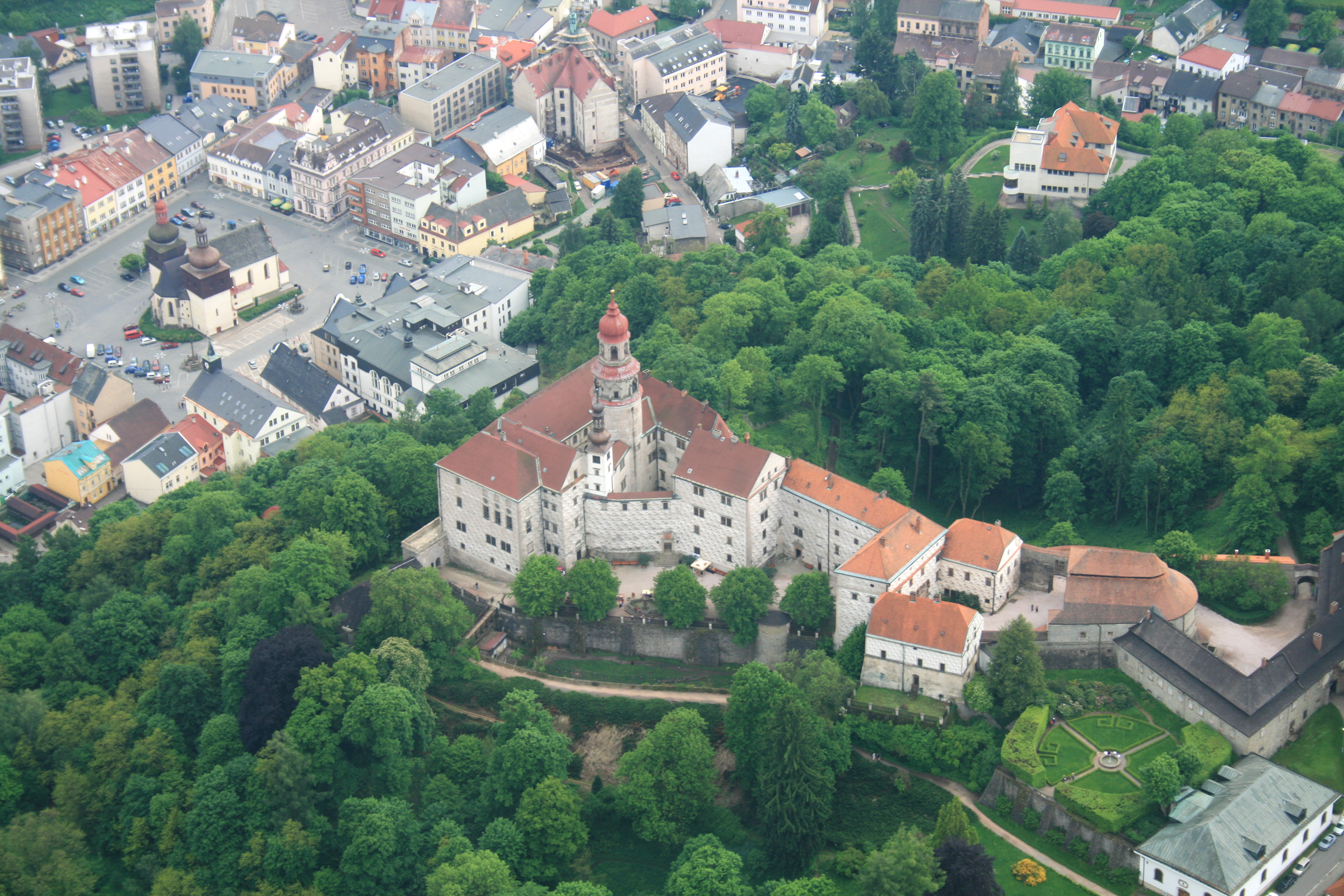
Aerial view of Náchod Castle

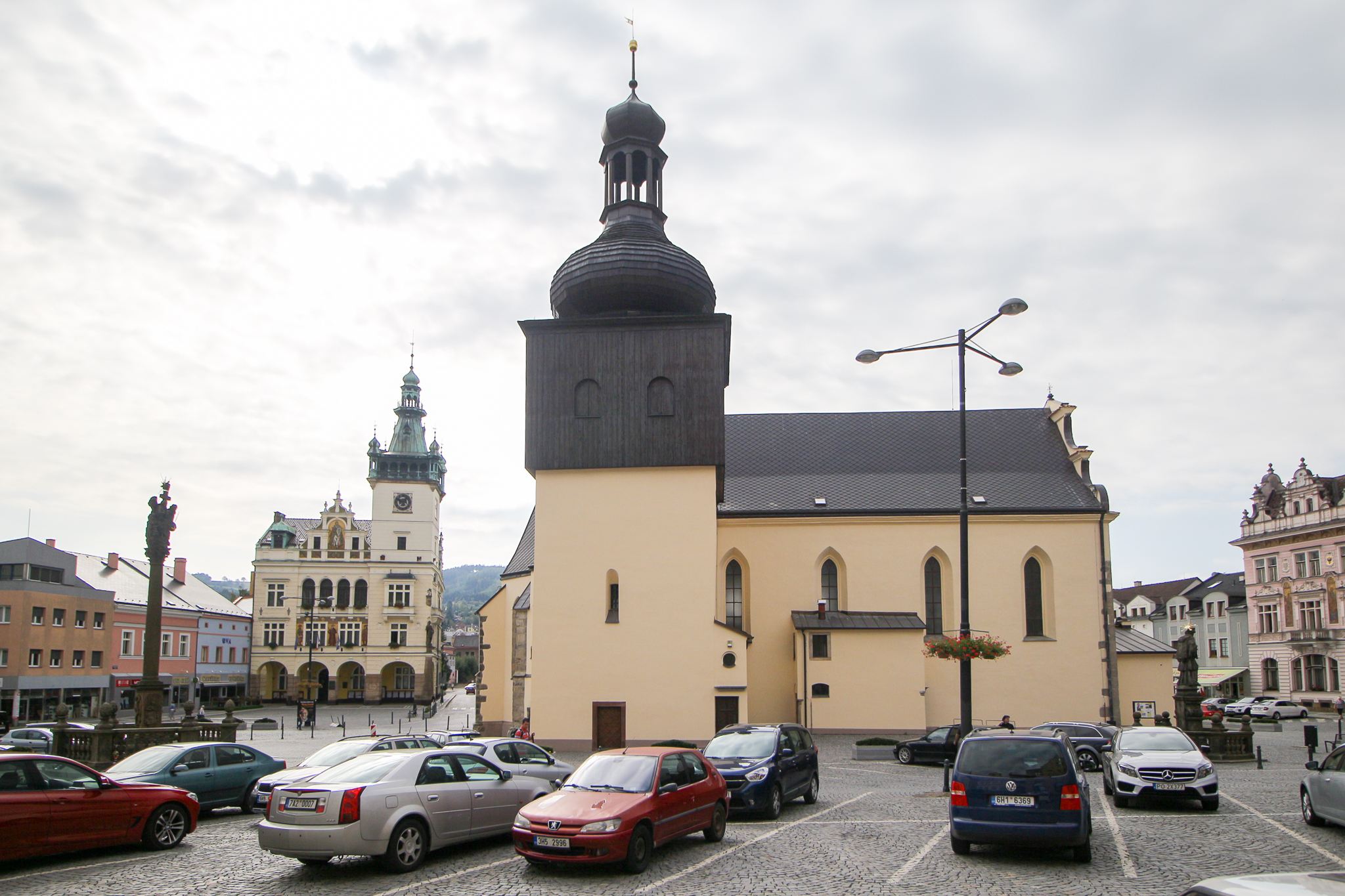
Church of Saint Lawrence and New Town Hall

=== Náchod Castle ===
Náchod Castle is the main landmark of the town. Since 1945, the castle is owned by the state. The interiors are open to the public, its exhibits include collections from Prince Ottavio Piccolomini's time (e.g. tapestries) or phaleristic and numismatic collections. Other sights include Gothic cellars, the lookout tower (keep), and a moat with bears, which is the largest bear enclosure in the country. Since 2002, the castle has been protected as a national cultural monument.

=== Ecclesiastical buildings ===
The Church of Saint Lawrence is located in the middle of the square Masarykovo náměstí in the historic town centre. It was first mentioned in 1350 and rebuilt in 1570–1578.

The Church of Saint Michael the Archangel was built in 1709–1716 in the Baroque style.

The Church of Saint John the Baptist in Staré Město nad Metují was built in the Gothic style in the 13th century and reconstructed in the 16th, 17th and 18th centuries. Since 1791, it is only a cemetery church.

=== Spa ===
The village of Běloves was known for its spa. The first mention of the healing water is from 1392. The spa was founded in 1818 and closed in 1996. Although the spa complex is in a desolate state, a small colonnade with two mineral springs and permanent exhibition on the history of spa was built by the town and opened in December 2019.

== Notable people ==
- Antonín Strnad (1746–1799), meteorologist and geographer
- Jan Letzel (1880–1925), architect
- Jan Roth (1899–1972), cinematographer
- Václav Černý (1905–1987), literary scholar and writer
- Josef Týfa (1913–2007), type designer
- Luba Skořepová (1923–2016), actress
- Josef Škvorecký (1924–2012), writer
- Petr Skrabanek (1940–1994), physician
- Josef Tošovský (born 1950), economist and former prime minister
- Václav Kotal (born 1952), football player and manager
- Libor Michálek (born 1968), economist and politician
- Vratislav Lokvenc (born 1973), footballer
- Pavel Bělobrádek (born 1976), politician
- Martin Štěpánek (born 1977), freediver
- Petr Schwarz (born 1991), footballer

== Twin towns – sister cities ==
Náchod is twinned with:

- Bauska, Latvia
- Halberstadt, Germany
- Kudowa-Zdrój, Poland
- Kłodzko, Poland
- Partizánske, Slovakia
- Persan, France
- Tiachiv, Ukraine
- Warrington, England, United Kingdom

== Gallery ==
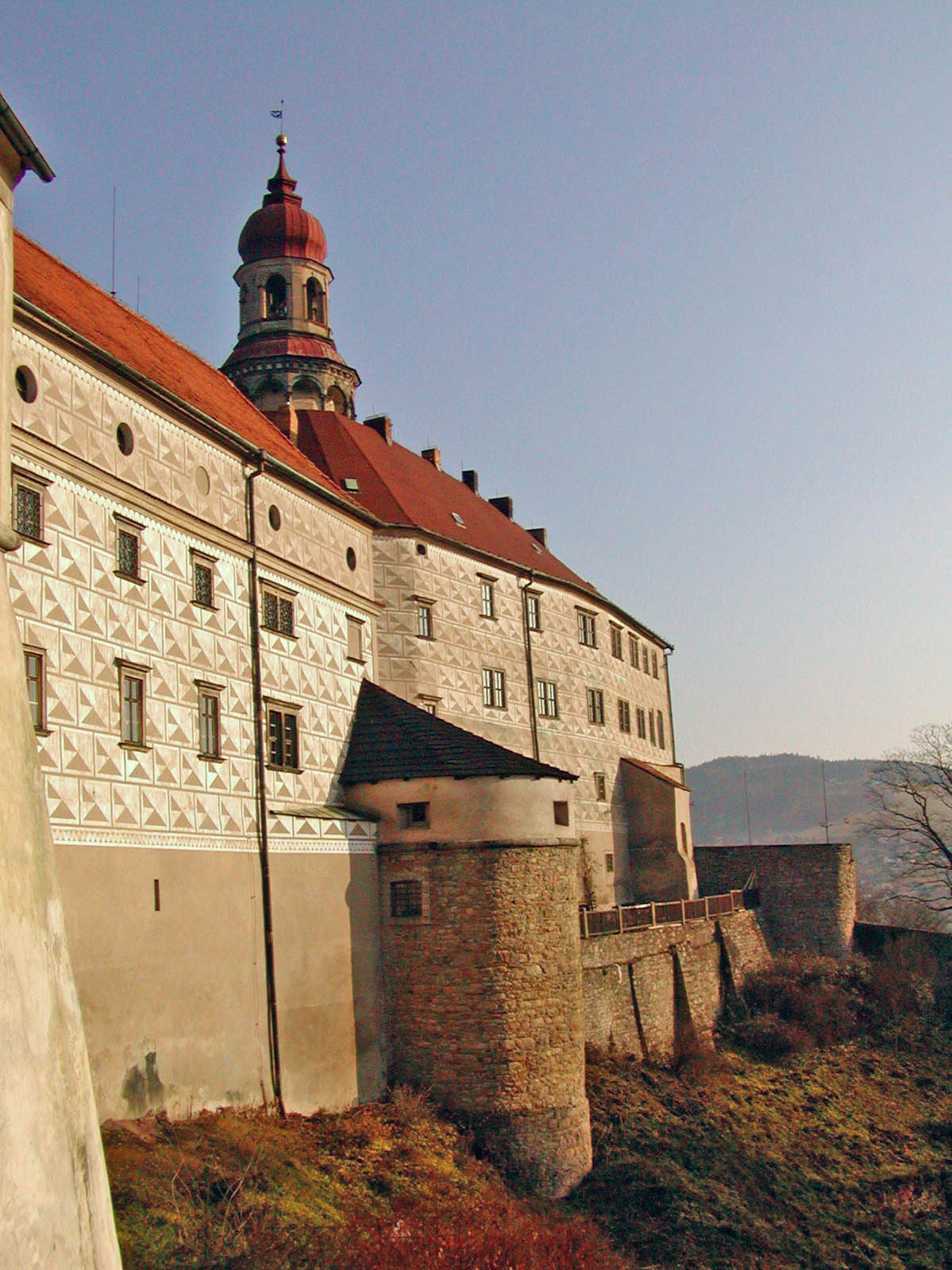
Náchod Castle

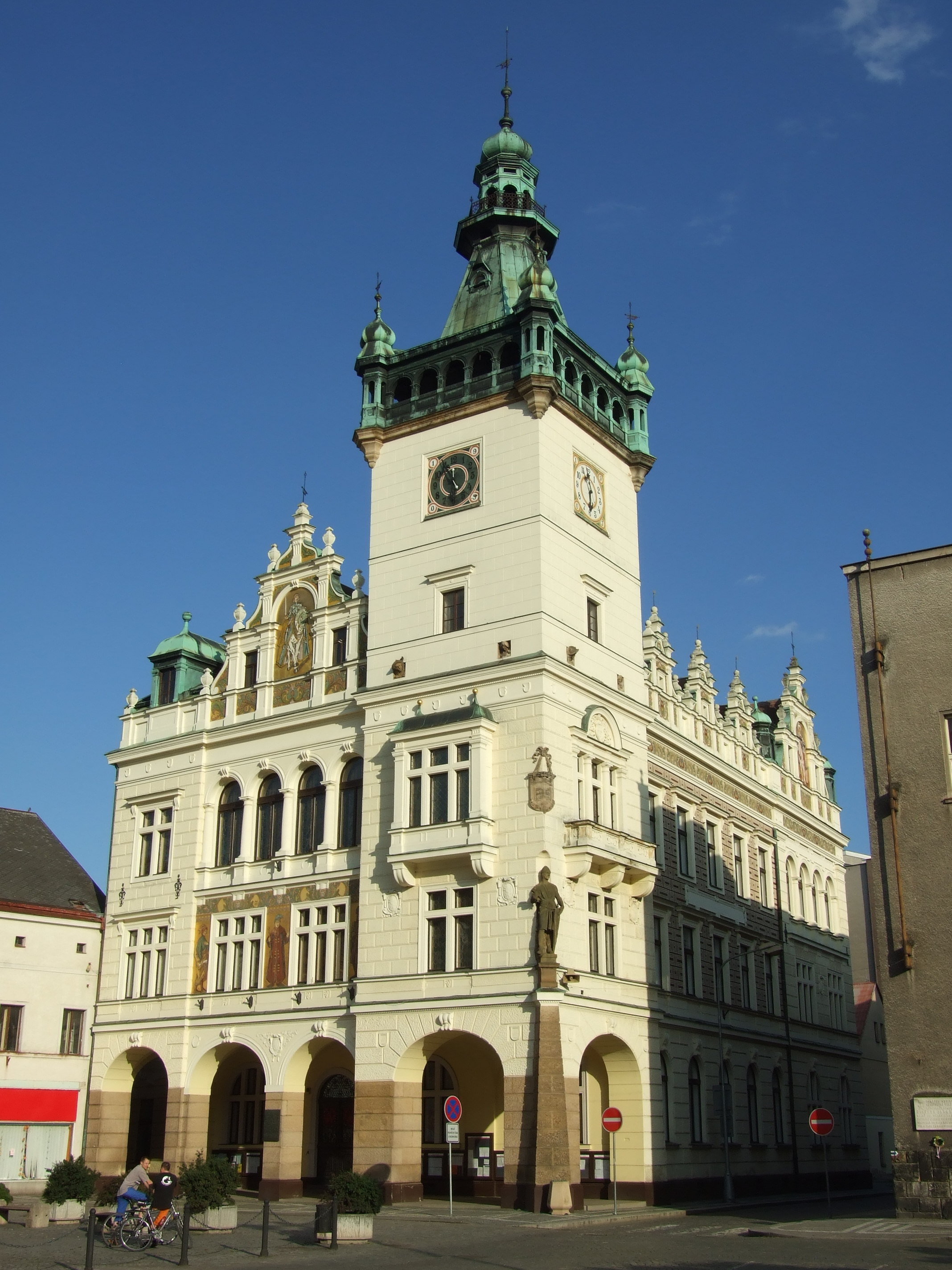
New Town Hall

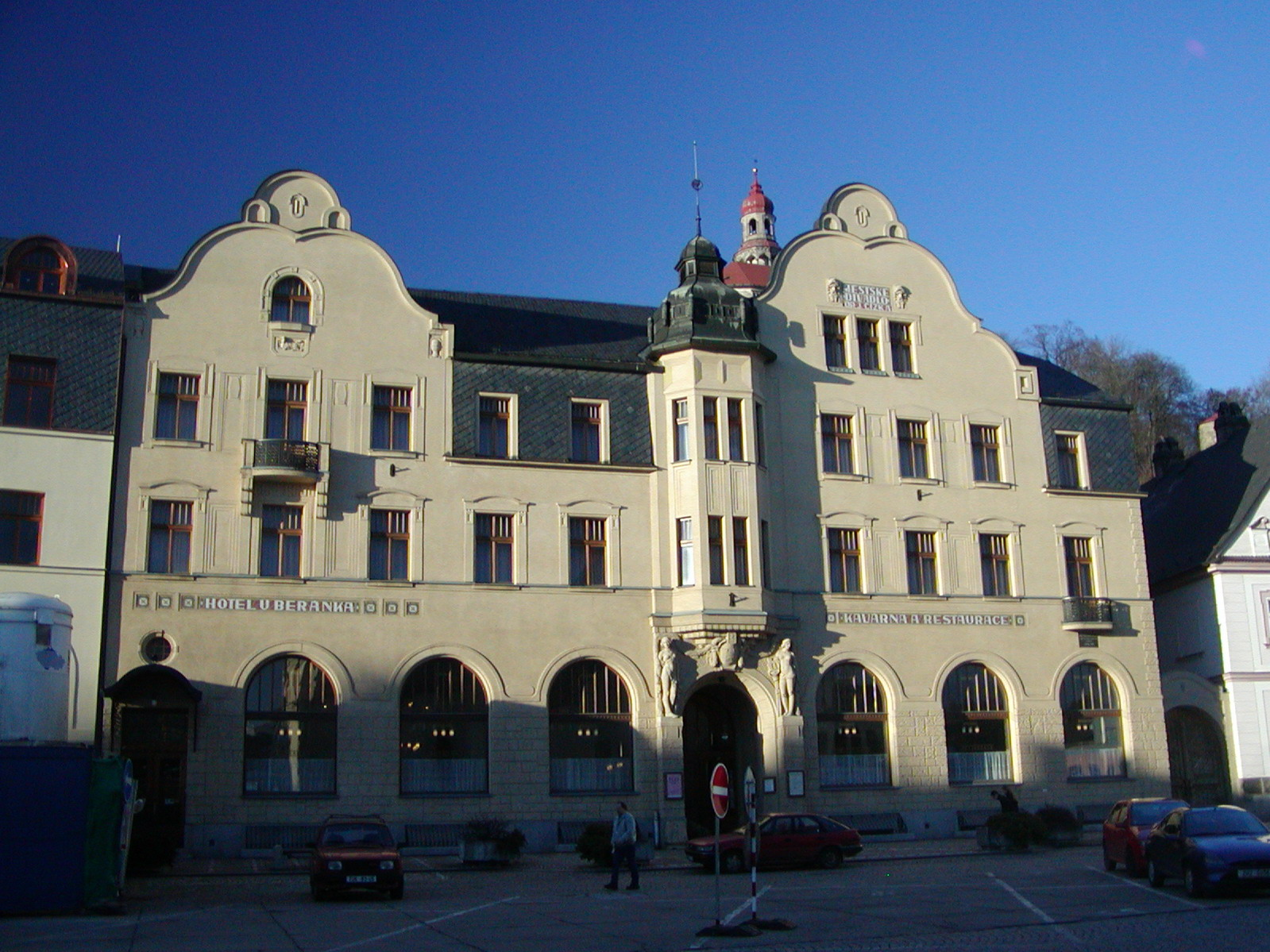
Hotel and theatre "U Beránka"

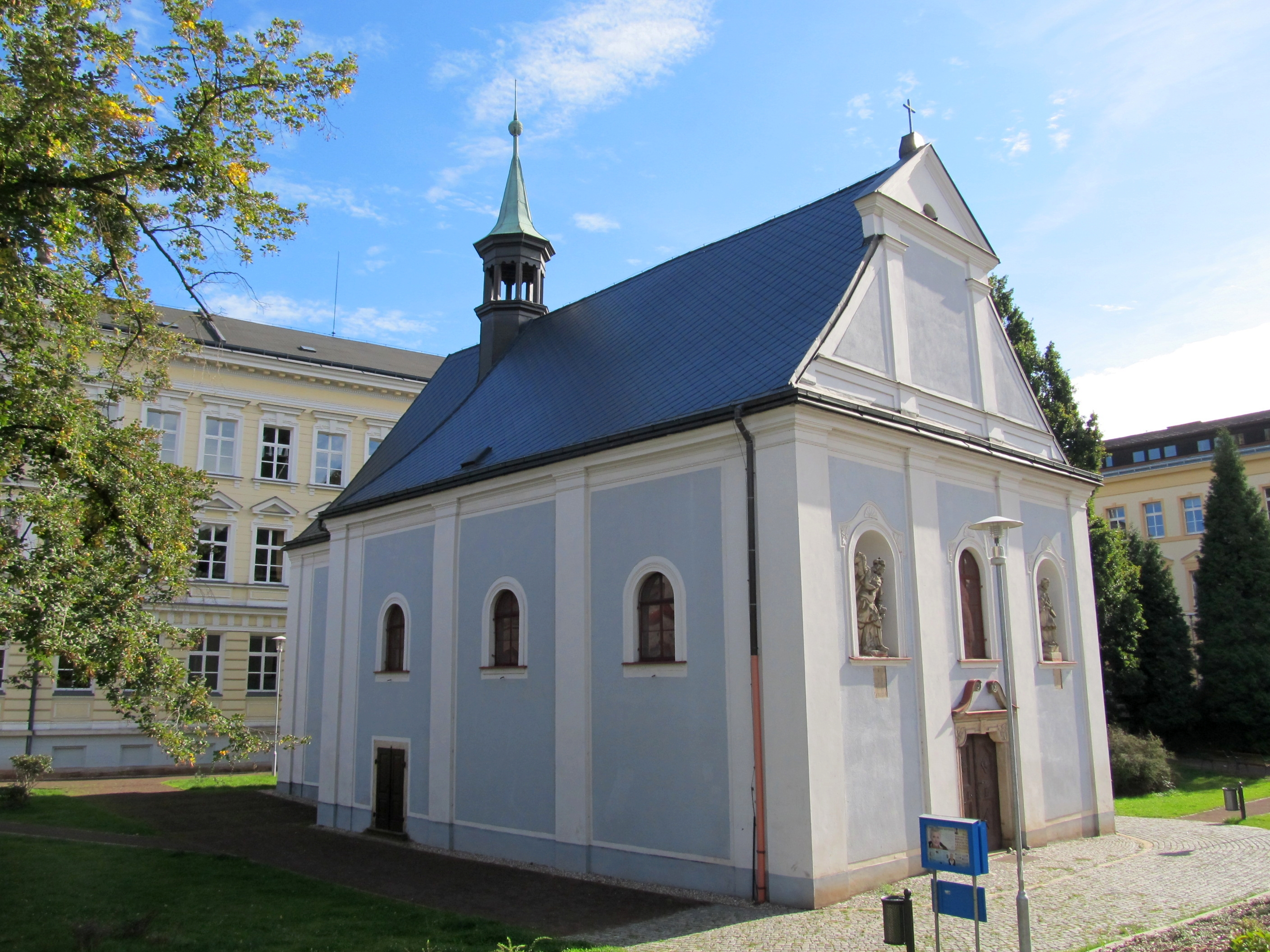
Church of Saint Michael the Archangel

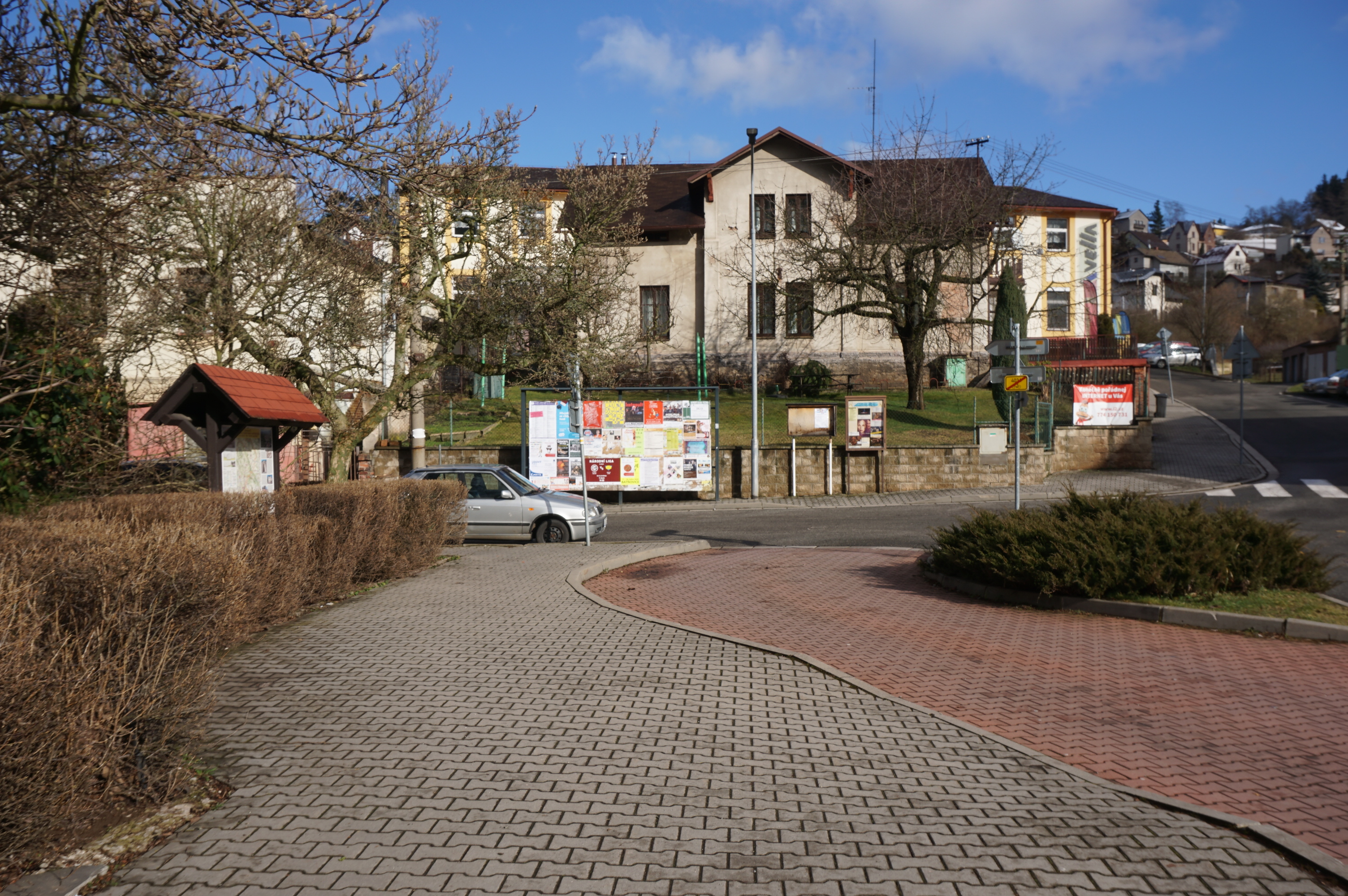
Staré Město nad Metují
