= Tisis penrissenica =

Scientific classification
- Kingdom: Animalia
- Phylum: Arthropoda
- Class: Insecta
- Order: Lepidoptera
- Family: Lecithoceridae
- Genus: Tisis
- Species: T. penrissenica

Binomial name
- Tisis penrissenica Park, J. S. Lee & Abang, 2005

Species of moth

Tisis penrissenica is a moth in the family Lecithoceridae. It was described by Kyu-Tek Park, Joon-Seok Lee and Fatimah Abang in 2005. It is found on Borneo.
