= Pavlišov =

- Village
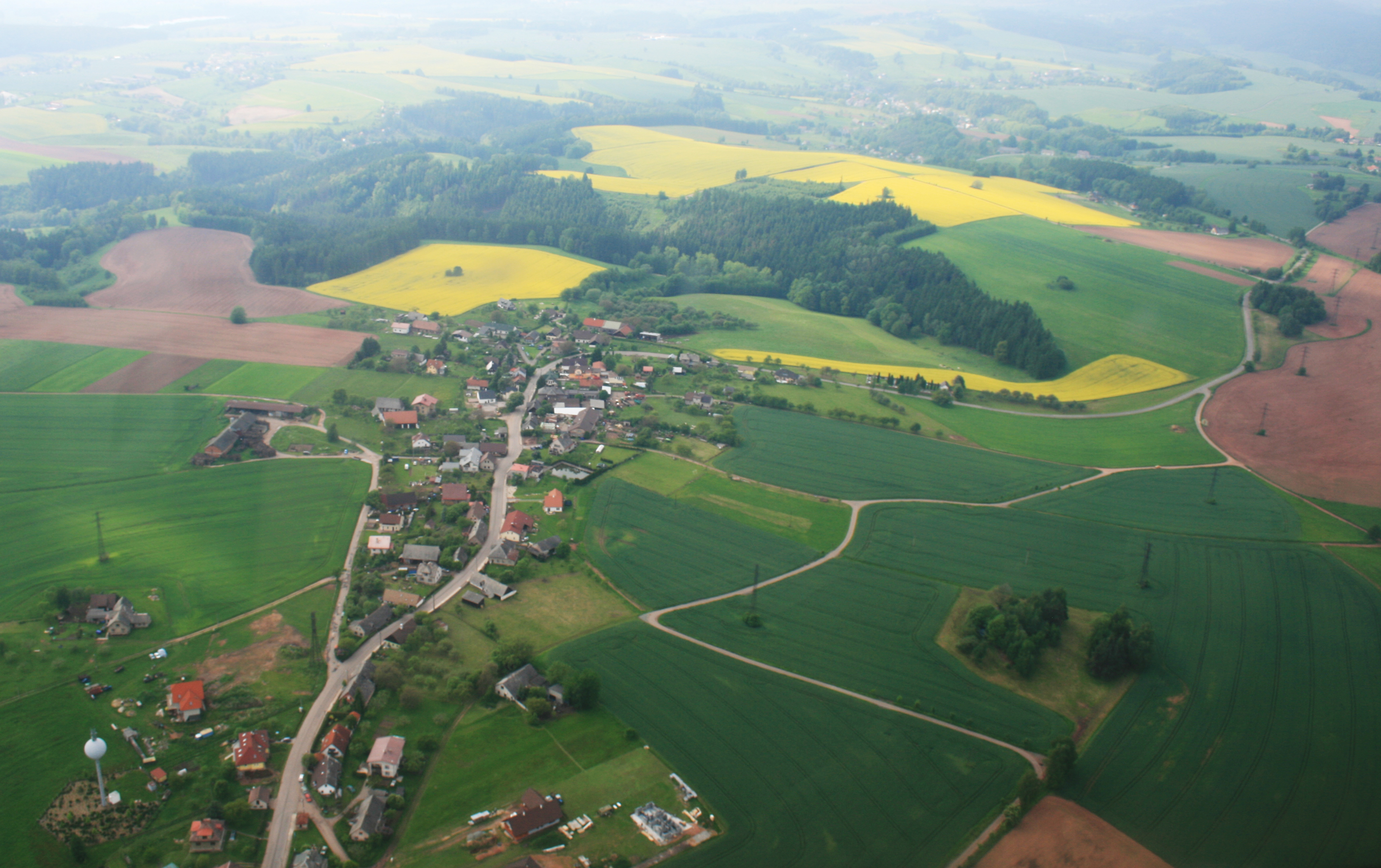
- Aerial view

- Location in the Czech Republic
- Coordinates: 50°26′56″N 16°10′11″E
- Country: Czech Republic
- Region: Hradec Králové
- District: Náchod
- Municipality: Náchod
- First mentioned: 1415

Area
  - Total: 2.89 km^{2} (1.12 sq mi)
- Elevation: 490 m (1,610 ft)

Population (2021)
  - Total: 194
  - Density: 67.1/km^{2} (174/sq mi)
- Time zone: UTC+1 (CET)
  - Summer (DST): UTC+2 (CEST)
- Postal code: 547 01

Pavlišov is a village and administrative part of Náchod in Náchod District in the Hradec Králové Region of the Czech Republic. It has about 200 inhabitants.
