= Tisis meliorella =

Scientific classification
- Kingdom: Animalia
- Phylum: Arthropoda
- Class: Insecta
- Order: Lepidoptera
- Family: Lecithoceridae
- Genus: Tisis
- Species: T. meliorella

Binomial name
- Tisis meliorella (Walker, 1864)

Synonyms
- Tingentera meliorella Walker, 1864

Species of moth

Tisis meliorella is a moth in the family Lecithoceridae. It was described by Francis Walker in 1864. It is found on Borneo and Sumatra.

Adults are chalybeous (steel blue), the forewings with an ochraceous costal stripe and with two ochraceous bands, the stripe decreasing in breadth from the base to the tip.
