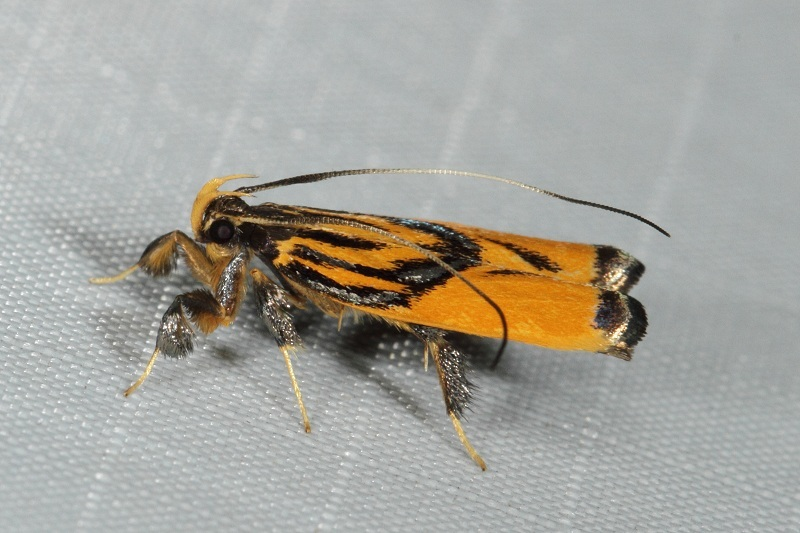

Scientific classification
- Kingdom: Animalia
- Phylum: Arthropoda
- Class: Insecta
- Order: Lepidoptera
- Family: Lecithoceridae
- Genus: Tisis
- Species: T. charadraea

Binomial name
- Tisis charadraea Meyrick, 1910

= Tisis charadraea =

Species of moth

Tisis charadraea is a moth in the family Lecithoceridae. It was described by Edward Meyrick in 1910. It is found in Malaysia.

The wingspan is about 20 mm. The forewings are deep orange with a leaden-metallic streak edged beneath by a black streak extending along the costa almost from the base to two-fifths. From the extremity of this, two broad purple-blackish streaks run to beyond the middle of the dorsum and tornus respectively, confluent above but separated on the lower two-thirds by a curved streak of the ground colour, an anterior streak marked with a silvery-metallic line. The basal area, as far as these, is marked above the middle with a black longitudinal streak, and the dorsal half is irregularly mixed with blackish. Beyond these streaks, the dorsal two-thirds is somewhat mixed with dark purple fuscous and there is a coppery-purple-blue streak along the termen. The hindwings are dark fuscous.
