= Tisis isoplasta =

Scientific classification
- Kingdom: Animalia
- Phylum: Arthropoda
- Class: Insecta
- Order: Lepidoptera
- Family: Lecithoceridae
- Genus: Tisis
- Species: T. isoplasta

Binomial name
- Tisis isoplasta Meyrick, 1929

Species of moth

Tisis isoplasta is a moth in the family Lecithoceridae. It was described by Edward Meyrick in 1929. It is found on Java in Indonesia.

The wingspan is about 22 mm.
