= Tisis hyacinthina =

Scientific classification
- Kingdom: Animalia
- Phylum: Arthropoda
- Class: Insecta
- Order: Lepidoptera
- Family: Lecithoceridae
- Genus: Tisis
- Species: T. hyacinthina

Binomial name
- Tisis hyacinthina Meyrick, 1910

Species of moth

Tisis hyacinthina is a moth in the family Lecithoceridae. It was described by Edward Meyrick in 1910. It is found on Borneo.

The wingspan is 13–15 mm. The forewings are deep indigo blue with the apical two-fifths orange, towards the apex suffused with dark fuscous. The hindwings are dark grey, the costa in males fringed with fine long hairs towards the middle.
