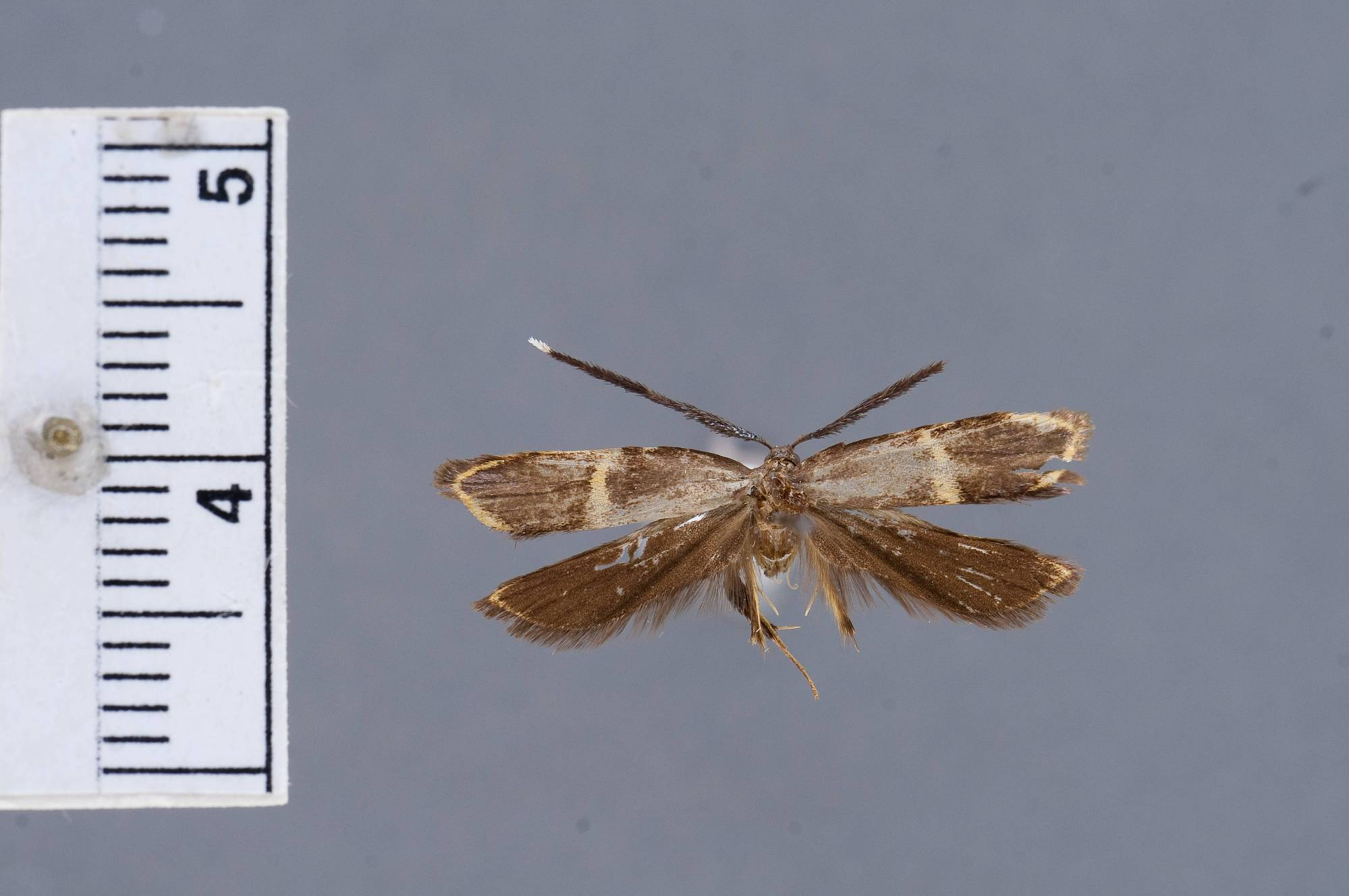
- Tisis auricincta holotype

Scientific classification
- Domain: Eukaryota
- Kingdom: Animalia
- Phylum: Arthropoda
- Class: Insecta
- Order: Lepidoptera
- Family: Lecithoceridae
- Genus: Tisis
- Species: T. auricincta

Binomial name
- Tisis auricincta Diakonoff, 1967

= Tisis auricincta =

Species of moth

Tisis auricincta is a moth in the family Lecithoceridae. It was described by Alexey Diakonoff in 1967. It is found on Mindanao in the Philippines.

The wingspan is 21–26 mm. The forewings are deep purple, posteriorly strewn with metallic purplish scales with prismatic reflections. The markings are yellow. There is a slender median transverse band, slightly outwards-oblique, gently outwards-convex, gradually dilated downwards. A narrow marginal streak is found along the posterior fifth of the costa, in the apex and along the termen to the tornus, along the lower half twice as broad. The hindwings are deep bronze brown, in males with the costal half light grey fuscous. There is a narrow line of yellow dusting around the apex and along the termen.
