= Tisis sophistica =

Scientific classification
- Kingdom: Animalia
- Phylum: Arthropoda
- Clade: Pancrustacea
- Class: Insecta
- Order: Lepidoptera
- Family: Lecithoceridae
- Genus: Tisis
- Species: T. sophistica

Binomial name
- Tisis sophistica Park, 2003

Species of moth

Tisis sophistica is a moth in the family Lecithoceridae. It was described by Kyu-Tek Park in 2003. It is found in Palawan in the Philippines.
