= Tipha =

Tipha may refer to:

- Siphae, a town of ancient Boeotia, Greece
- Tisis, a genus of insects
