= Tisis eurylampis =

Scientific classification
- Kingdom: Animalia
- Phylum: Arthropoda
- Class: Insecta
- Order: Lepidoptera
- Family: Lecithoceridae
- Genus: Tisis
- Species: T. eurylampis

Binomial name
- Tisis eurylampis Meyrick, 1910

Species of moth

Tisis eurylampis is a moth in the family Lecithoceridae. It was described by Edward Meyrick in 1910. It is found on Borneo.

The wingspan is about 17 mm. The forewings are orange, the basal sixth silvery metallic fuscous and with an irregular silvery-metallic submedian spot before the middle. The apical two-fifths is rather dark shining coppery fuscous, with the anterior edge convex. The hindwings are rather dark fuscous.
