= Tisis chalybaeella =

Scientific classification
- Kingdom: Animalia
- Phylum: Arthropoda
- Class: Insecta
- Order: Lepidoptera
- Family: Lecithoceridae
- Genus: Tisis
- Species: T. chalybaeella

Binomial name
- Tisis chalybaeella (Walker, 1864)

Synonyms
- Tipha chalybaeella Walker, 1864; Tirallis latifasciella Walker, 1864

Species of moth

Tisis chalybaeella is a moth in the family Lecithoceridae. It was described by Francis Walker in 1864. It is found on Borneo.

Adults are cupreous, the forewings ochraceous, with three chalybeous (steel-blue) stripes, which extend from the base to beyond the middle, and are connected at their tips. The marginal band and fringe are chalybeous. The hindwings are cupreous brown.
