= Tisis hemixysta =

Scientific classification
- Kingdom: Animalia
- Phylum: Arthropoda
- Class: Insecta
- Order: Lepidoptera
- Family: Lecithoceridae
- Genus: Tisis
- Species: T. hemixysta

Binomial name
- Tisis hemixysta Meyrick, 1910

Species of moth

Tisis hemixysta is a moth in the family Lecithoceridae. It was described by Edward Meyrick in 1910. It is found on Borneo.

The wingspan is 18–20 mm. The forewings are dark fuscous, with a bronzy-purplish tinge and a transverse orange streak at one-fourth, enlarged on the costa and extended along it to near the base. There is a transverse orange streak from the dorsum about the middle, reaching two-thirds of the way across the wing. The space between these two streaks is mixed with bright silvery metallic and there is an orange streak along the costa from the middle almost to the apex. The terminal area is tinged with coppery metallic. The hindwings are dark fuscous, in males with the costal third thinly clothed with long fine expansible hairs except towards the apex.
