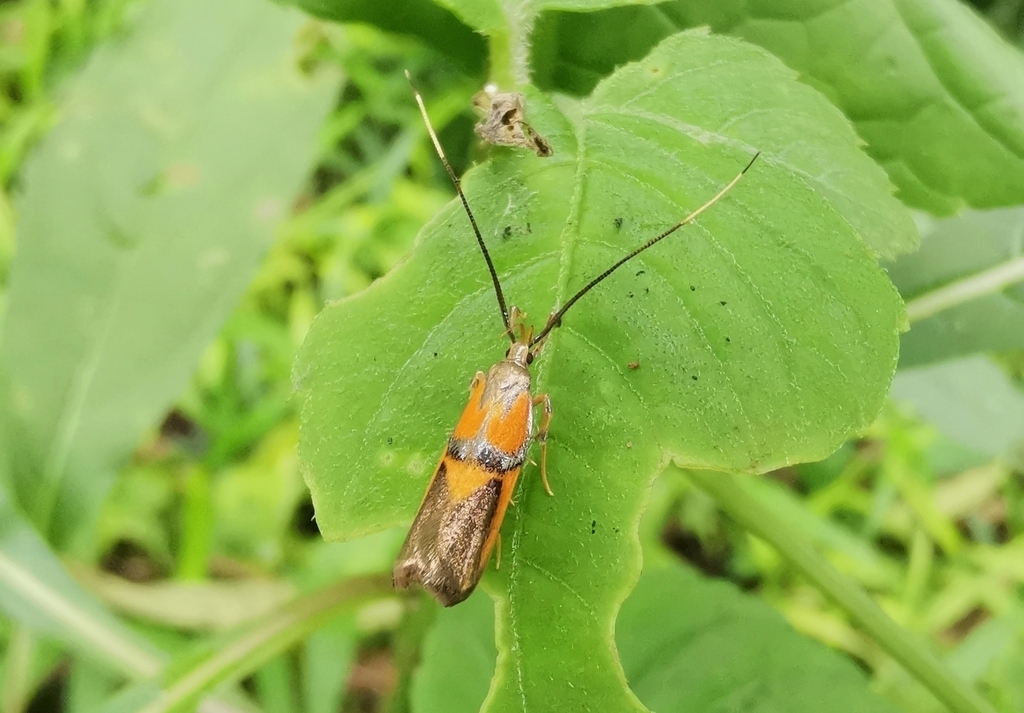

Scientific classification
- Kingdom: Animalia
- Phylum: Arthropoda
- Class: Insecta
- Order: Lepidoptera
- Family: Lecithoceridae
- Genus: Tisis
- Species: T. helioclina

Binomial name
- Tisis helioclina (Meyrick, 1894)

Synonyms
- Tipha helioclina Meyrick, 1894

= Tisis helioclina =

Species of moth

Tisis helioclina is a moth in the family Lecithoceridae. It was described by Edward Meyrick in 1894. It is found in Myanmar.

The wingspan is 20–22 mm. The forewings are bright orange with a dark leaden-metallic streak along the inner margin from one-fourth to the base, then along the costa to one-third, where it crosses the wing in a rather strong curve to the middle of the inner margin. There is a large bronzy-purplish-fuscous patch occupying the apical area, its anterior edge forming a very strong rounded angulation which reaches to the middle of the wing. The hindwings are rather dark purplish fuscous.
