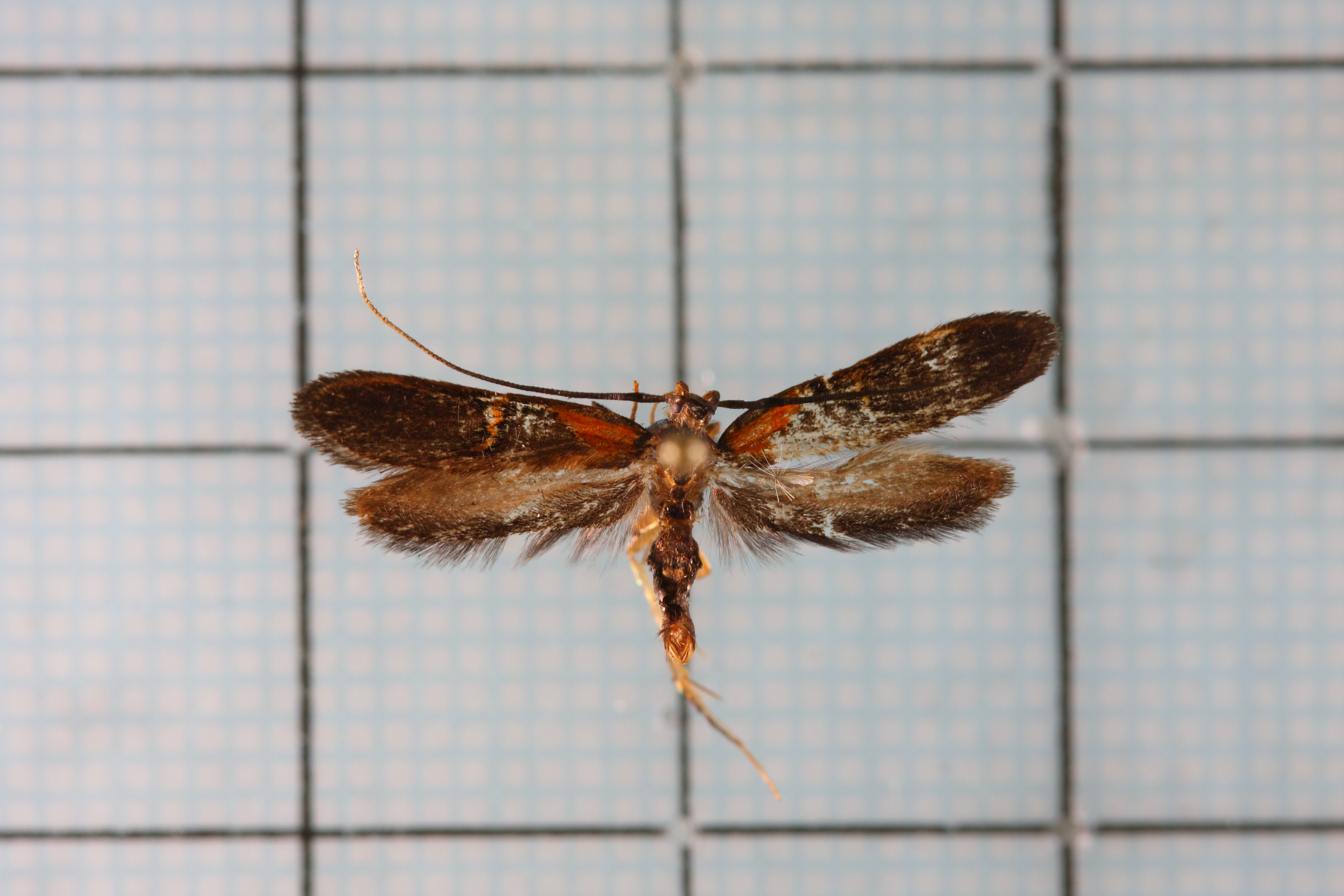

Scientific classification
- Domain: Eukaryota
- Kingdom: Animalia
- Phylum: Arthropoda
- Class: Insecta
- Order: Lepidoptera
- Family: Lecithoceridae
- Genus: Tisis
- Species: T. mesozosta

Binomial name
- Tisis mesozosta Meyrick, 1914

= Tisis mesozosta =

Species of moth

Tisis mesozosta is a moth in the family Lecithoceridae. It is found in Taiwan and Anhui, Fujian, Jiangxi, Hainan and Yunnan provinces of China.

The wingspan is 19–21 mm.
