= Tisis imperatrix =

Scientific classification
- Kingdom: Animalia
- Phylum: Arthropoda
- Class: Insecta
- Order: Lepidoptera
- Family: Lecithoceridae
- Genus: Tisis
- Species: T. imperatrix

Binomial name
- Tisis imperatrix Meyrick, 1910

Species of moth

Tisis imperatrix is a moth in the family Lecithoceridae. It was described by Edward Meyrick in 1910. It is found on Borneo.

The wingspan is about 20 mm. The forewings are bright deep coppery purple, with strong indigo-blue reflections. The hindwings are dark purple fuscous.
