= Tisis sabahensis =

Scientific classification
- Kingdom: Animalia
- Phylum: Arthropoda
- Clade: Pancrustacea
- Class: Insecta
- Order: Lepidoptera
- Family: Lecithoceridae
- Genus: Tisis
- Species: T. sabahensis

Binomial name
- Tisis sabahensis Park, 2003

Species of moth

Tisis sabahensis is a moth in the family Lecithoceridae. It was described by Kyu-Tek Park in 2003. It is found on Sabah, Malaysia's easternmost state.

The wingspan is about 26 mm.

== Etymology ==
The species name refers to the type locality, Sabah.
