= Tisis gloriosa =

Scientific classification
- Kingdom: Animalia
- Phylum: Arthropoda
- Clade: Pancrustacea
- Class: Insecta
- Order: Lepidoptera
- Family: Lecithoceridae
- Genus: Tisis
- Species: T. gloriosa

Binomial name
- Tisis gloriosa Park, 2009

Species of moth

Tisis gloriosa is a moth in the family Lecithoceridae. It was described by Kyu-Tek Park in 2009. It is found in Thailand.
