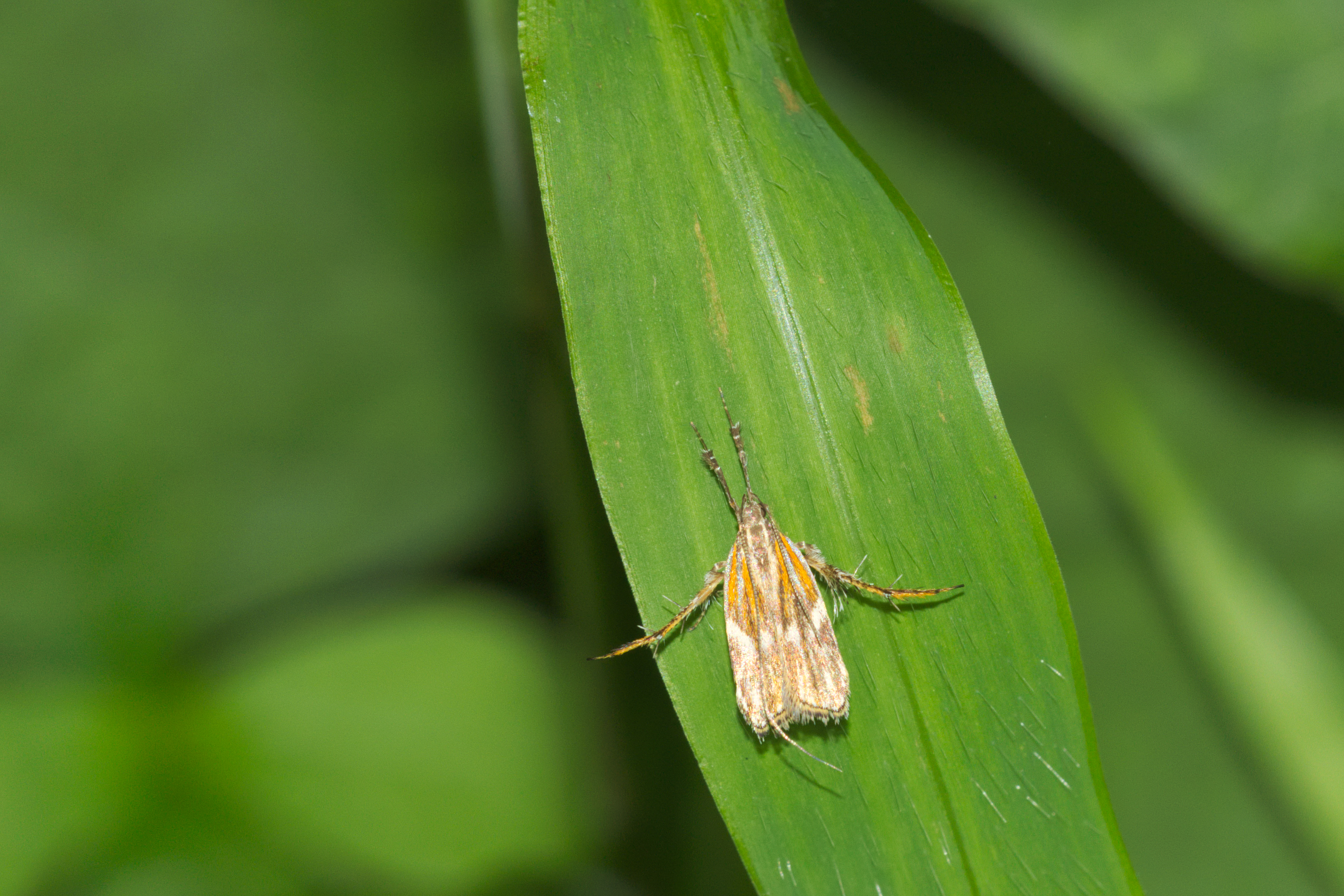
- Tisis sp.

Scientific classification
- Kingdom: Animalia
- Phylum: Arthropoda
- Class: Insecta
- Order: Lepidoptera
- Family: Lecithoceridae
- Subfamily: Lecithocerinae
- Genus: Tisis; Walker, 1864

Synonyms
- Tonosa Walker, 1864; Tingentera Walker, 1864; Tipha Walker, 1864; Tirallis Walker, 1864; Togia Walker, 1864; Decuaria Walker, 1864; Cacogamia Snellen, 1903

= Tisis =

Genus of moths

Tisis is a genus of small moths in the family Lecithoceridae. The genus was erected by Francis Walker in 1864.

== Species ==
- Tisis amabilis Park, 2003
- Tisis argyrophaea Meyrick, 1910
- Tisis asterias Park, 2003
- Tisis aurantiella Park, 2003
- Tisis auricincta Diakonoff, 1967
- Tisis aurifasciata Park, 2007
- Tisis bicolorella Walker, 1864
- Tisis boleta C. S. Wu, 1998
- Tisis cerambycina Meyrick, 1926
- Tisis chalybaeella (Walker, 1864)
- Tisis charadraea Meyrick, 1910
- Tisis colubrialis Park, 2005
- Tisis diehli Park, 2007
- Tisis elegans (Snellen, 1903)
- Tisis eurylampis Meyrick, 1910
- Tisis frimensis Park, 2005
- Tisis gloriosa Park, 2009
- Tisis helioclina Meyrick, 1894
- Tisis hemixysta Meyrick, 1910
- Tisis hyacinthina Meyrick, 1910
- Tisis imperatrix Meyrick, 1910
- Tisis isoplasta Meyrick, 1929
- Tisis javaica Park, 2007
- Tisis latiductalis Park, 2005
- Tisis luteella (Snellen, 1903)
- Tisis meliorella Walker, 1864
- Tisis mendicella (Walker, 1864)
- Tisis mesozosta Meyrick, 1914
- Tisis nemophorella Walker, 1864
- Tisis nielseni Park, 2001
- Tisis penrissenica Park, 2005
- Tisis plautata C. S. Wu, 1998
- Tisis polemarcha Meyrick, 1926
- Tisis polychlora Meyrick, 1926
- Tisis sabahensis Park, 2003
- Tisis sandaradema C. S. Wu, 1998
- Tisis seclusella (Walker, 1864)
- Tisis sophistica Park, 2003
- Tisis sumatraensis Park, 2007
- Tisis thaiana Park, 2003
- Tisis xantholepidos Park, 2007
- Tisis yasudai Park, 2003
