= Grafotechna =

- Company type: Aktiengesellschaft
- Industry: Type foundry
- Founded: 1951
- Defunct: 1990
- Headquarters: Prague, Czechoslovakia

Grafotechna (Grafotechna n. p., Závod 5, Výroba písma, mosazných linek a matric) was a Czechoslovak type foundry, created in 1951. It ceased to exist after 1990. It was the only manufacturer of metal types in the former Czechoslovakia.

Among other things, it manufactured fonts designed by Czech type designers Oldřich Menhart and Josef Týfa.

== Typefaces ==
These foundry types were produced by Grafotechna:

- Brno Z (1951, Jan Rambousek)
- Ceska Unciala (1945, Oldřich Menhart)
- Drynkov (K. Drynkov)
- Empiriana (1920)
- Figural (Oldřich Menhart)
- Garamond (1959, Stanislav Marso)
- Kalab (Method Kalab)
- Kolektiv (1952, S. Duda, K. Misek, Josef Týfa)
- Manuscript (1944-50, Oldřich Menhart)
- Menhart (1938, Oldřich Menhart), originally Monotype, later Grafotechna.
- Monument (1950-52, Oldřich Menhart)
- Tyfa (1959, Josef Týfa)
