= Brethren =

Brethren, also called "brothers", are male siblings.

(The) Brethren may refer to:

== Groups and organizations ==
- Brethren (religious group), any of a number of religious groups
- Brethren (Australian group), an Australian hip hop group
- Brethren, an early name of Lindisfarne (folk rock group)
- Brethren of the Coast, a loose coalition of Caribbean pirates
- Brethren of the Croatian Dragon, a Croatian historical society

== In arts and entertainment ==
- The Brethren or Bratrstvo, an 1899–1908 trilogy novel by Alois Jirásek
- The Brethren (Haggard novel) or Brethren, a 1904 novel by H. Rider Haggard (title depends on market)
- The Brethren: Inside the Supreme Court, a 1979 book by Bob Woodward and Scott Armstrong
- The Brethren (Grisham novel), a 2000 novel by John Grisham
- Brethren (novel), a 2006 novel by Robyn Young
- The Brethren, a 2006 novel by Beverly Lewis
- The Brethren, the 2015 English language title of the 1977 French historical novel Fortune de France by Robert Merle
- Brethren, a book of poetry by Ida Gerding Athens
- The Brethren, a fictional warrior race in the Marvel Comics universe, created by the Celestials
