= Jírova hora =

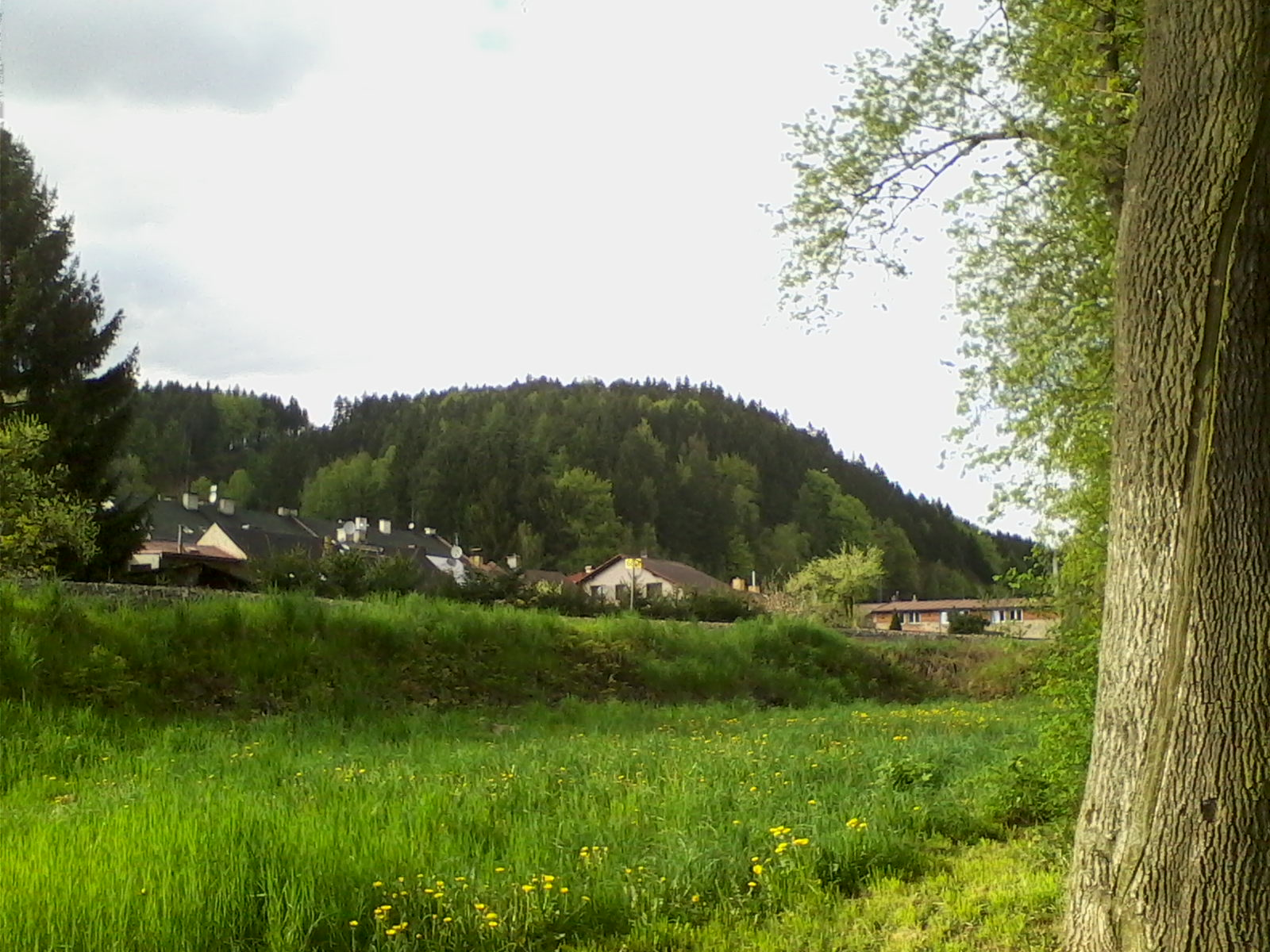
- Jírova hora viewed from a park in Hronov

Highest point
- Elevation: 485 m (1,591 ft)
- Coordinates: 50°29′13″N 16°10′32″E

Geography
- Location within Czech Republic
- Location: Hronov, Czech Republic
- Parent range: Broumov Highlands

Jírova hora (literally 'Jíra's mountain') is a hill in the territory of Hronov in the Hradec Králové Region of the Czech Republic. It lies in the Broumov Highlands and has an altitude of 485 m (1,591 ft). It is situated between the villages of Zbečník, Rokytník and Velký Dřevíč.

== Description ==
The eastern slope of the hill is very steep. The whole hill is covered mainly by coniferous forest (mainly spruce trees) and meadows. A deciduous forest grows on the southern slope, falling to Zbečník. A part of the forest on the top of the hill and the north slope is formed by young coniferous trees. A very small stream flows from the northern slope, from Rokytník to Velký Dřevíč. On the top of the hill there is a radio communications transmitter. In the western direction from the top of hill, construction of an artillery fort of the Czechoslovak border fortification system was planned prior to World War II.

== Gallery ==
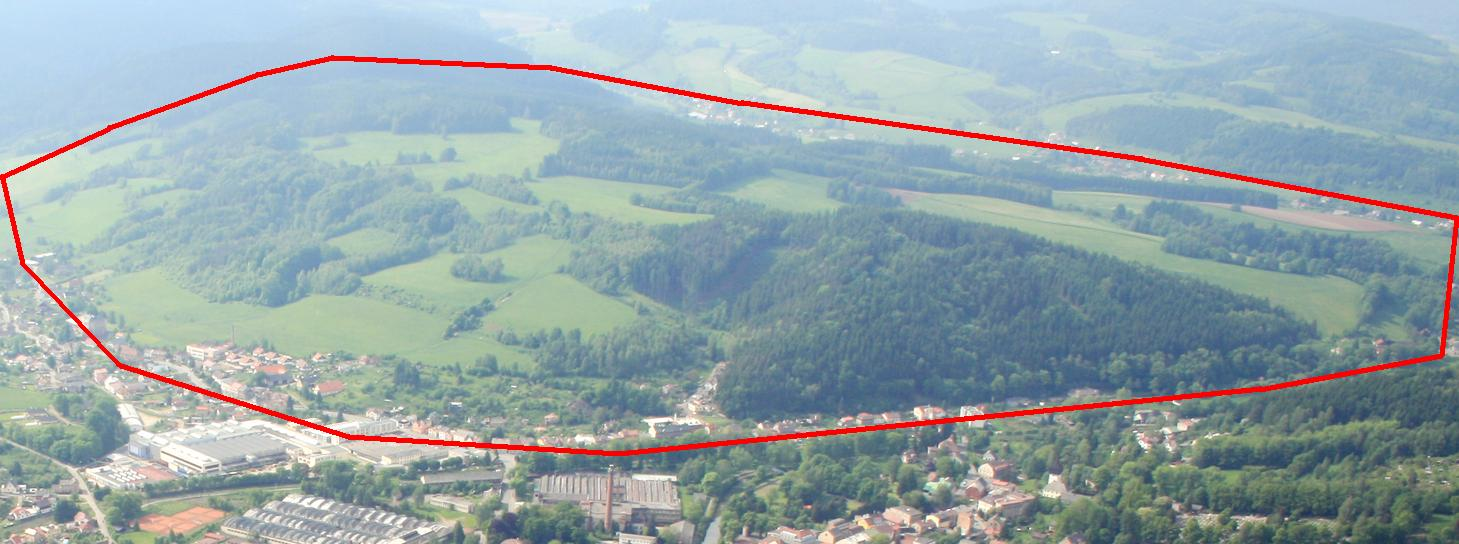
Aerial view

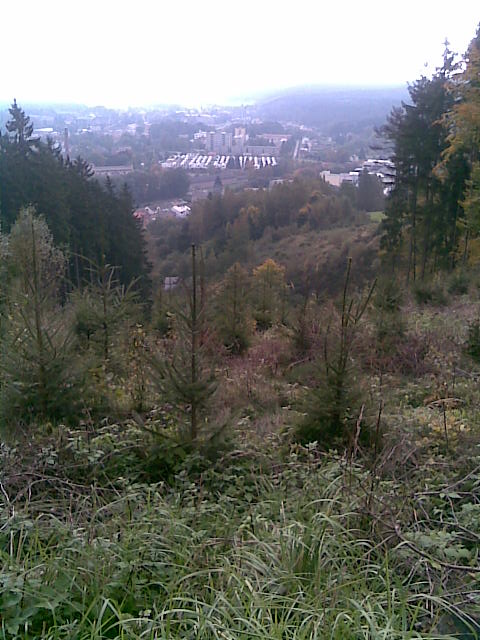
Panorama of Hronov viewed from the top
