= Hronovka and Regnerka =

Mineral springs in Hronov, Bohemia, Czech Republic

Coordinates: 50.4822°N 16.1800°E

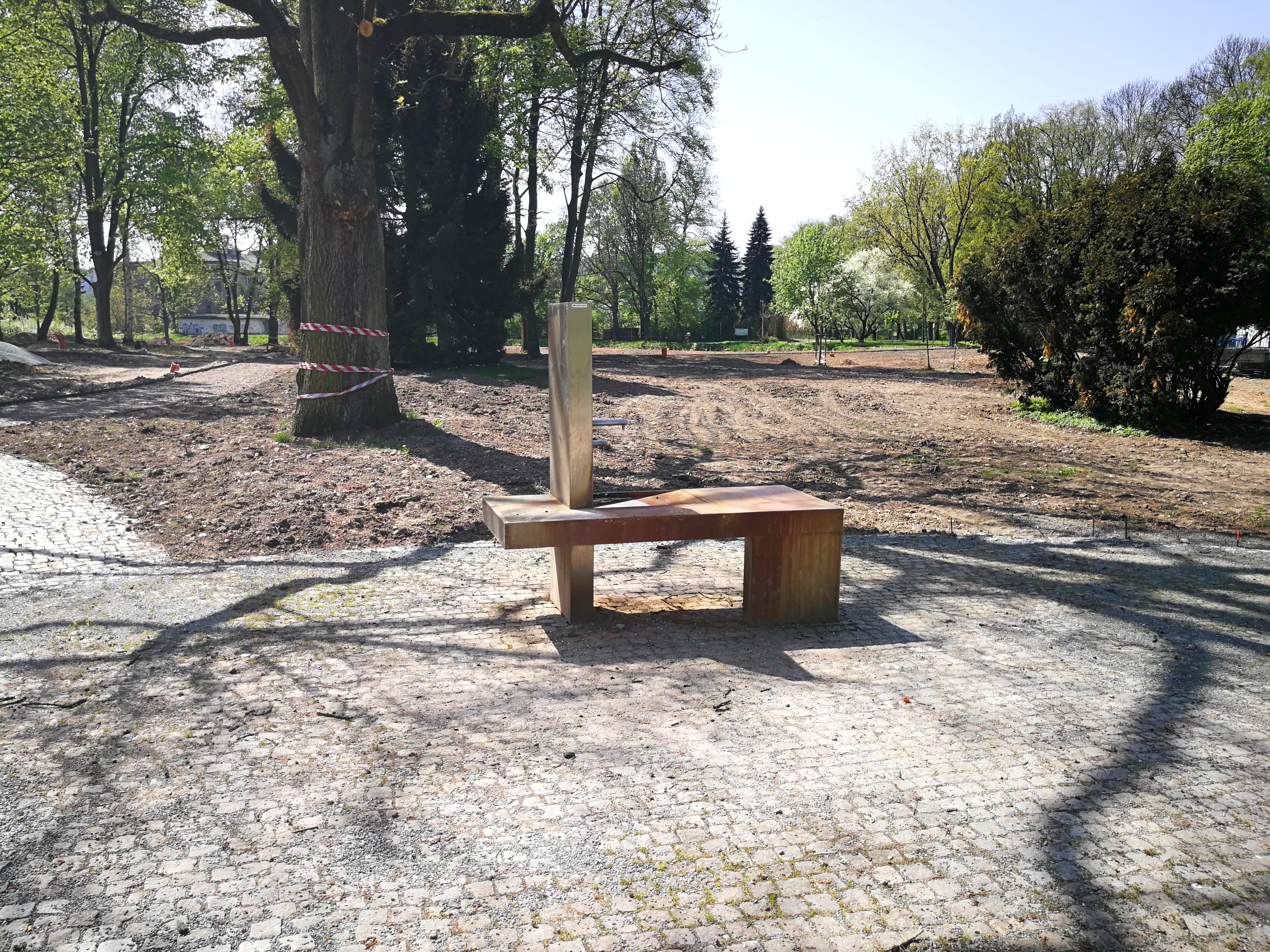

Hronovka and Regnerka (collectively known as Prdlavka) are a pair of mineral springs located in Hronov in the Czech Republic. They are situated in the Jiráskovy sady park.

== History ==
The springs were discovered in 1865 by priest Regner Havlovický behind the home of Czech writer Alois Jirásek. Havlovicky noticed a strange-coloured deposit flowing into the Metuje river from the spring. Deeming that the water had curative properties, Jirásek's father (owner of the property on which the springs were discovered) had, by 1869, built a spa with bathing facilities filled with water from the springs. The spa eventually became defunct, but was restored by the town authorities during World War II. The facility was later remodelled in 1977, with a full reconstruction in 2013, part of a wider regeneration project for Jiráskovy Sady.

== Properties ==
Both springs provide rich alkaline-ferrous water, which those who use it believe to have medical benefits. For example, its alkaline reaction is said to decompose kidney, urinary and gall bladder stones. In addition to iron, the spring water also contains calcium, magnesium, iodine and sulphur, which gives it a strong smell, and sodium and potassium ions. The water is also high in arsenic acid, which locals say acts against the initial stages of sclerosis, high blood pressure and body fatigue.
