= Božena Jelínková-Jirásková =

Czech artist (1880–1951)

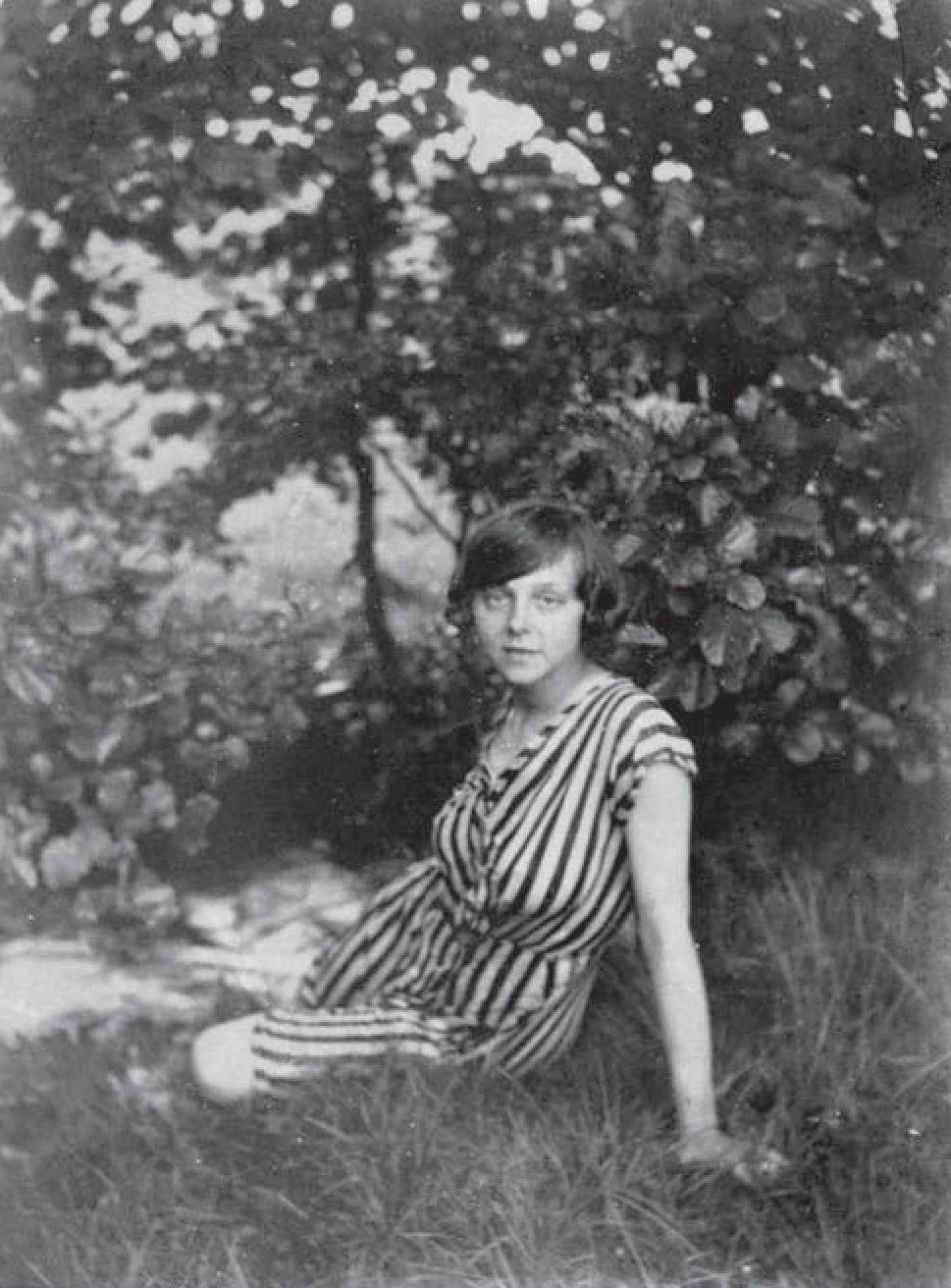
- Jelínková-Jirásková in 1920
- Born: Božena Jirásková; 10 June 1880; Litomyšl, Bohemia, Austria-Hungary
- Died: 5 September 1951 (aged 71); Hronov, Czechoslovakia
- Known for: Painting, mainly still lifes and landscapes
- Spouse: Hanuš Jelínek
- Parent(s): Alois Jirásek and Marie Podhajská

Božena Jelínková-Jirásková (10 June 1880 – 5 September 1951) was a Czech artist, known in particular for her still lifes. She lived for many years in Paris and exhibited both there and in Czechoslovakia.

== Early life ==
Jelínková-Jirásková was born on 10 June 1880 in Litomyšl in Bohemia, Austria-Hungary, where her father, the writer Alois Jirásek, taught at a grammar school. Her mother was Marie Podhajská, and Božena was the first of the couple's children. In 1888, she moved with her family to the Czech capital, Prague. After attending middle school, she completed training at a school of the Czech Women's Manufacturing Association and then enrolled at the School of Applied Arts, graduating in 1904, with teachers who included the painter, Jakub Schikaneder. She then took private lessons with the painter Antonín Slavíček.

== Career ==
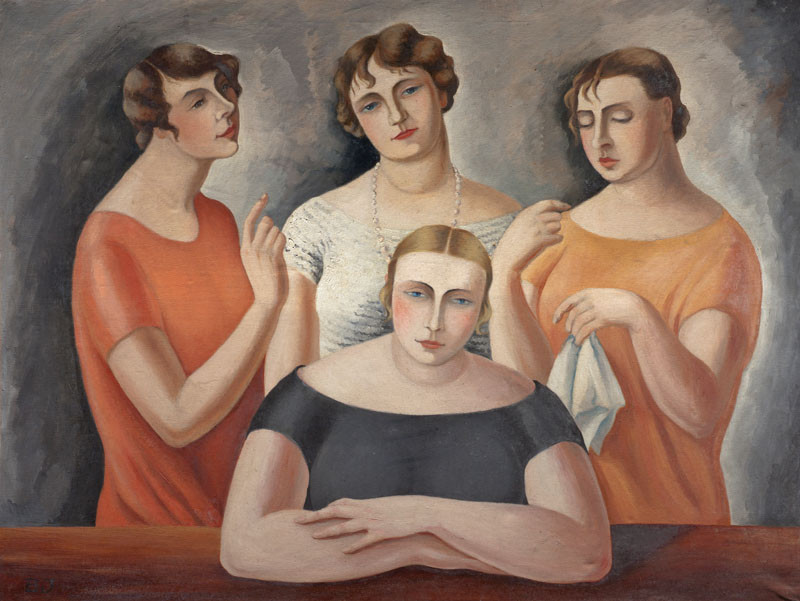
Three sisters by Jelínková-Jirásková

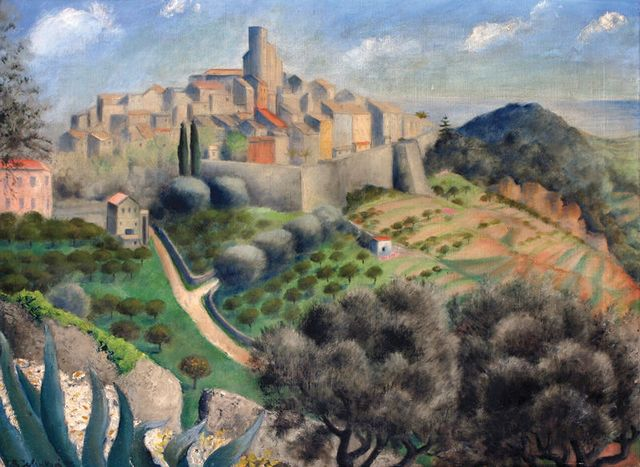
Landscape from southern France by Jelínková-Jirásková

In 1905, Jelínková-Jirásková married the then theatre critic Hanuš Jelínek, travelling around Europe with him and then spending time in France, where he became a lecturer on Czech literature at the Sorbonne in 1909. After World War I, the couple returned to Paris in January 1919, when her husband accompanied the Czechoslovak delegation to the Paris Peace Conference (1919–1920) before obtaining a job at the Czechoslovak Press Office in Paris and, from 1926, a diplomatic posting. After he obtained this position, they began to organise fortnightly tea parties attended by Czech residents in Paris and Czech visitors to the city. At least part of the reason for these events was her husband's aim to try to overcome her homesickness. The teas were held on Fridays and were attended by 40 to 50 guests.

She belonged to a generation of female painters who sought to discard the traditional concept of art education as just being part of a general education for girls from well-off bourgeois families. In the early 20th century, the prejudices surrounding the idea of a woman being a professional artist were gradually being pushed aside. Other Czech women with similar interests included painters such as Zdenka Braunerová, Anna Boudová Suchardová, and Vlasta Vostřebalová-Fischerová. In Paris she took part in several annual exhibitions, such as the Salon d’Automne, Salon des Indépendants, and the Salon des Tuileries, where she mainly exhibited landscapes. In the 1920s, her artistic expression gradually matured and she slowly moved away from Impressionism in favour of realistic and figurative work. She began to capture the outskirts of Paris, as well as its street scenes.

In 1925, she published Patero pohádek ('Five fairy tales'), which she both wrote and illustrated. After her husband obtained his diplomatic position, they began to travel in France, visiting Point Penmarc'h, Quimper and Saint-Malo in Brittany, followed by several destinations in Provence, including Avignon, Marseille, and Saint-Raphaël. She was greatly influenced by the work of Otakar Kubín, the Czech painter who had settled in Provence at Simiane-la-Rotonde. Although Paul Cézanne had died in 1906, she was also influenced by his early landscape work.

== Later exhibitions ==
Having continued to exhibit in Prague after her departure to Paris, she had her first solo exhibition in the Topič Salon in Prague in 1924, where she presented her works from the World War I period and from her travels abroad. From 1929, Jelínková-Jirásková was a member of the Mánes Union of Fine Arts, participating in regular group exhibitions of the association. A second solo exhibition at the same location followed in 1931. In early 1937 her work was included in the women-only exhibition in Paris called Les femmes artistes d'Europe, held at the Jeu de Paume in the Tuileries Palace. The exhibition moved to Prague in the summer of 1937, under the title of Women Artists of Europe Exhibit at the Prague Exhibition. Her next solo exhibition took place in 1940. These paintings reflected a return home to the Czech landscape; Jelínková-Jirásková finding inspiration in the summer residence of the Jirásek family in Hronov, the mountain villages around Harrachov, and in her husband's birthplace of Příbram. She continued to exhibit until her death.

== Death and legacy ==
Jelínková-Jirásková died on 5 September 1951 in Hronov. A retrospective of her work was held in 1953 at the Práce Gallery in Prague.

== Gallery ==
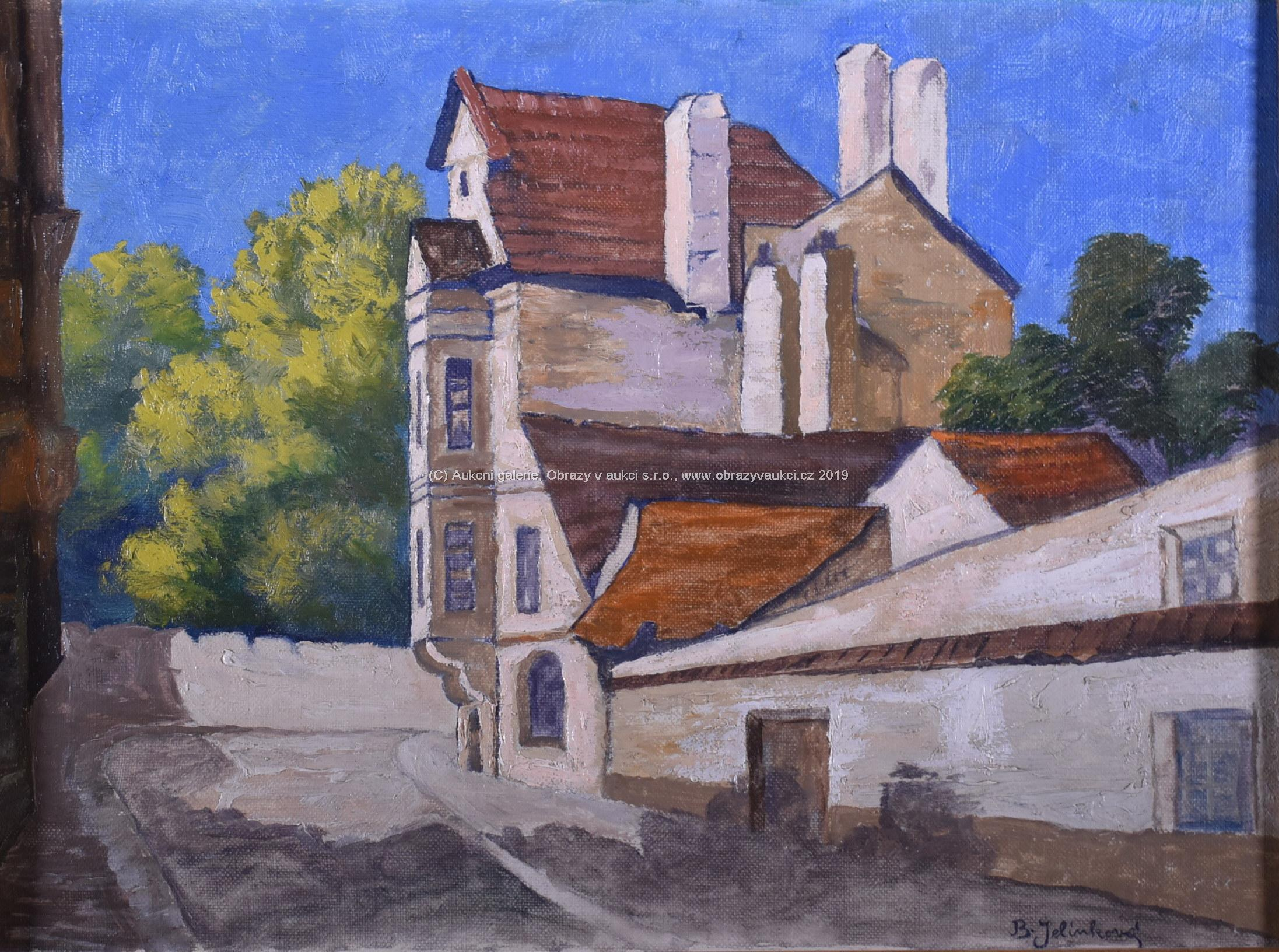
The House on the Corner (pre-1951, oil on canvas)

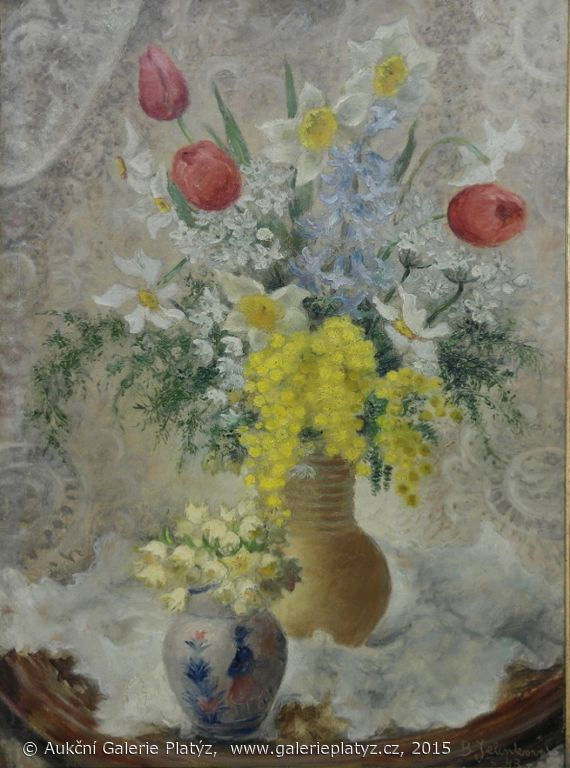
Floral Still Life (pre-1951, oil on canvas)

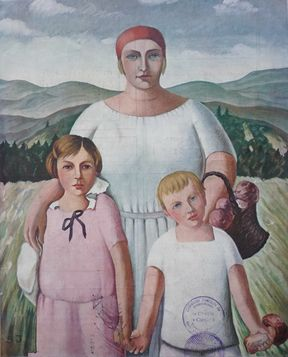
Renáta and Jaroušek, grandchildren of Master Jiráska (pre-1951)

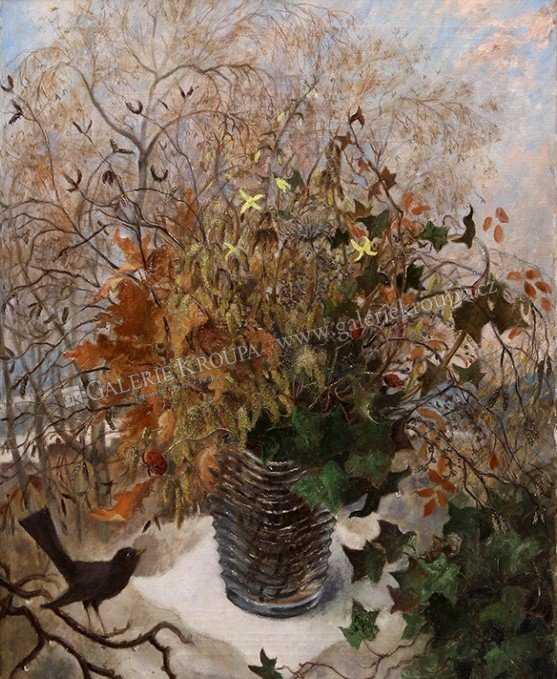
Still Life with a Bird (1930, oil on canvas)
