= Jiráskův Hronov =

Annual Czech theater festival

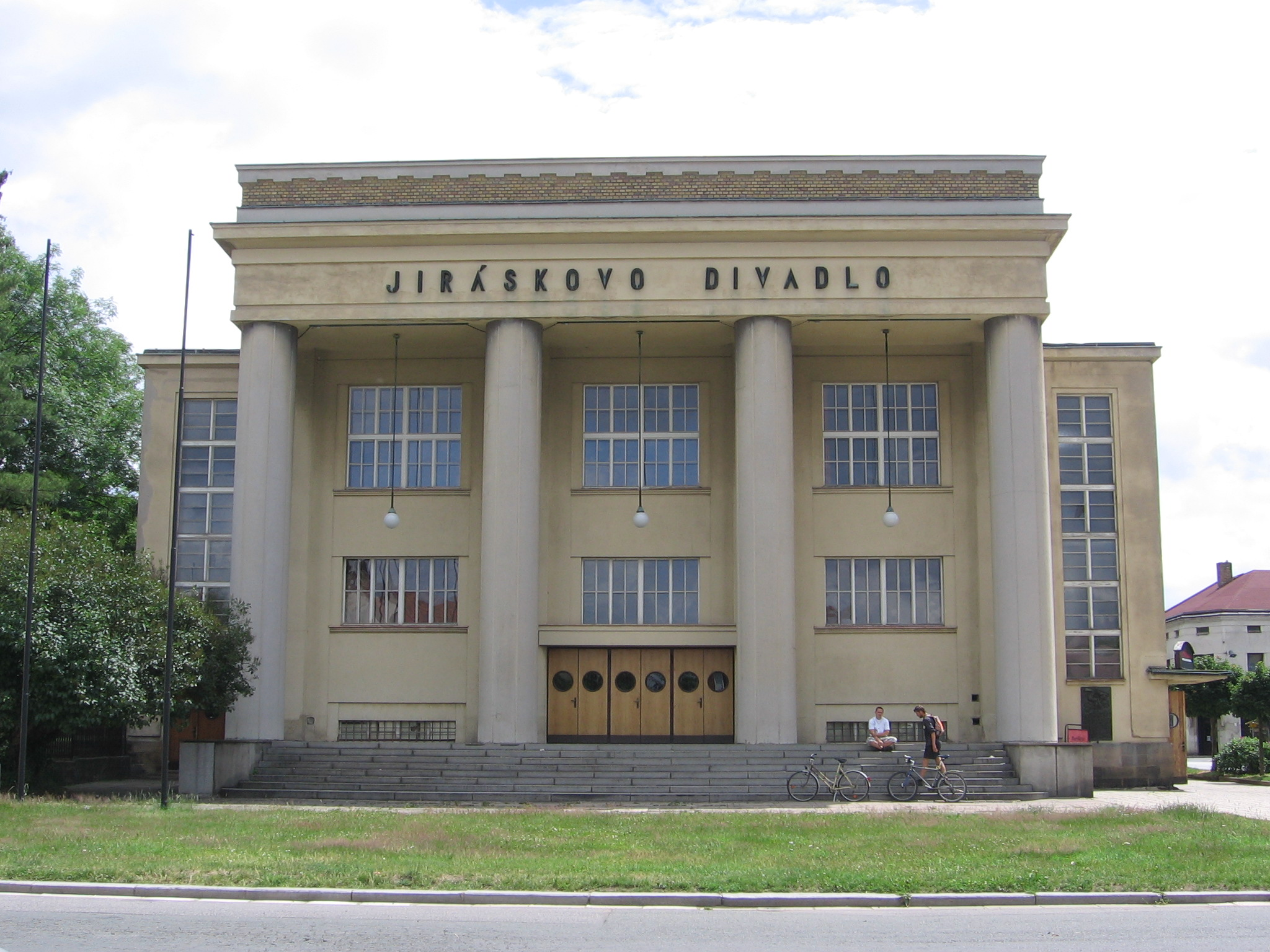
Jirásek's Theatre in Hronov, one of the stages of Jiráskův Hronov.

Jiráskův Hronov (in English: Jirásek's Hronov) is a festival of Czech amateur theatre with international participation. It takes place annually in Hronov, the town in the northeast of the Czech Republic. The festival was named after the outstanding Czech writer Alois Jirásek. According to the Czech theatre critic Vladimír Hulec, Jiráskův Hronov is the oldest amateur theatre festival in the world. The first year of the festival took place in 1930, in a commemoration of Alois Jirásek's 80th birthday. During its existence, the festival became a national presentation of Czech amateur theatre, open for all theatre genres. The festival has non-competitive character, however, organizers annually award the unofficial Golden Alois Prize ("Zlatý Alois"). The majority of performances held in Jirásek's Theatre in Hronov.
