= Zbečník =

- Village
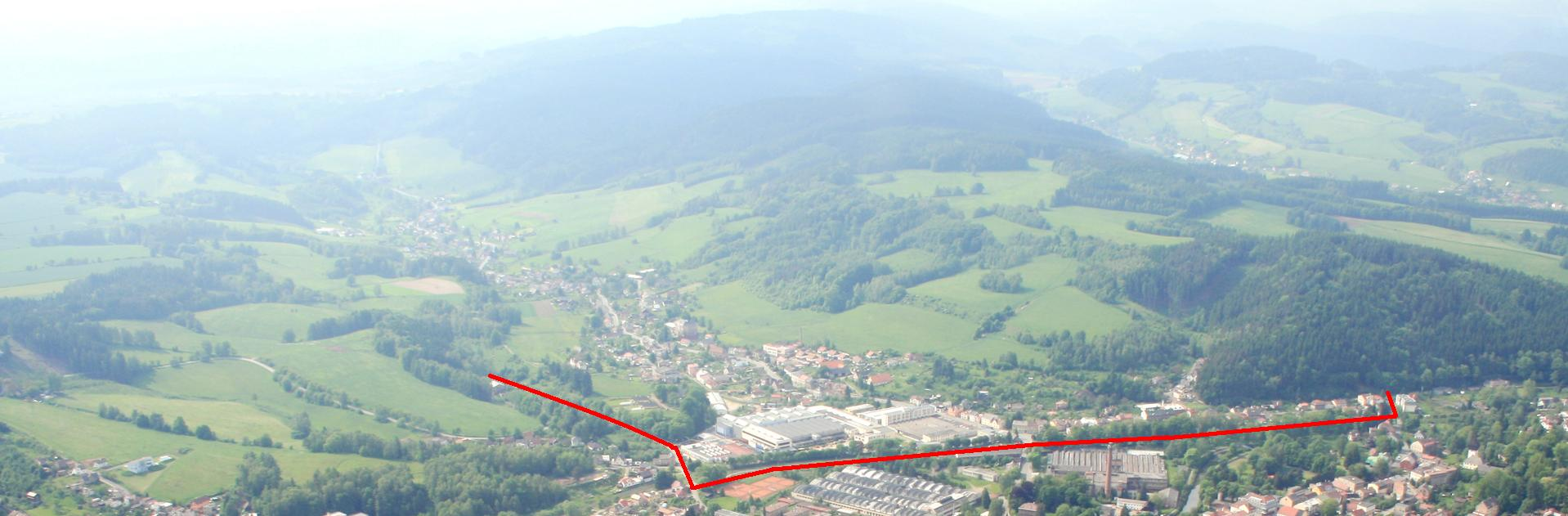
- Aerial view

- Location in the Czech Republic
- Coordinates: 50°28′50″N 16°10′06″E
- Country: Czech Republic
- Region: Hradec Králové
- District: Náchod
- Municipality: Hronov
- First mentioned: 1422

Population (2021)
  - Total: 1,008
- Time zone: UTC+1 (CET)
  - Summer (DST): CEST
- Website: www.zbecnik.com

Zbečník is a village and municipal part of Hronov in the Hradec Králové Region of the Czech Republic.

== Geography ==
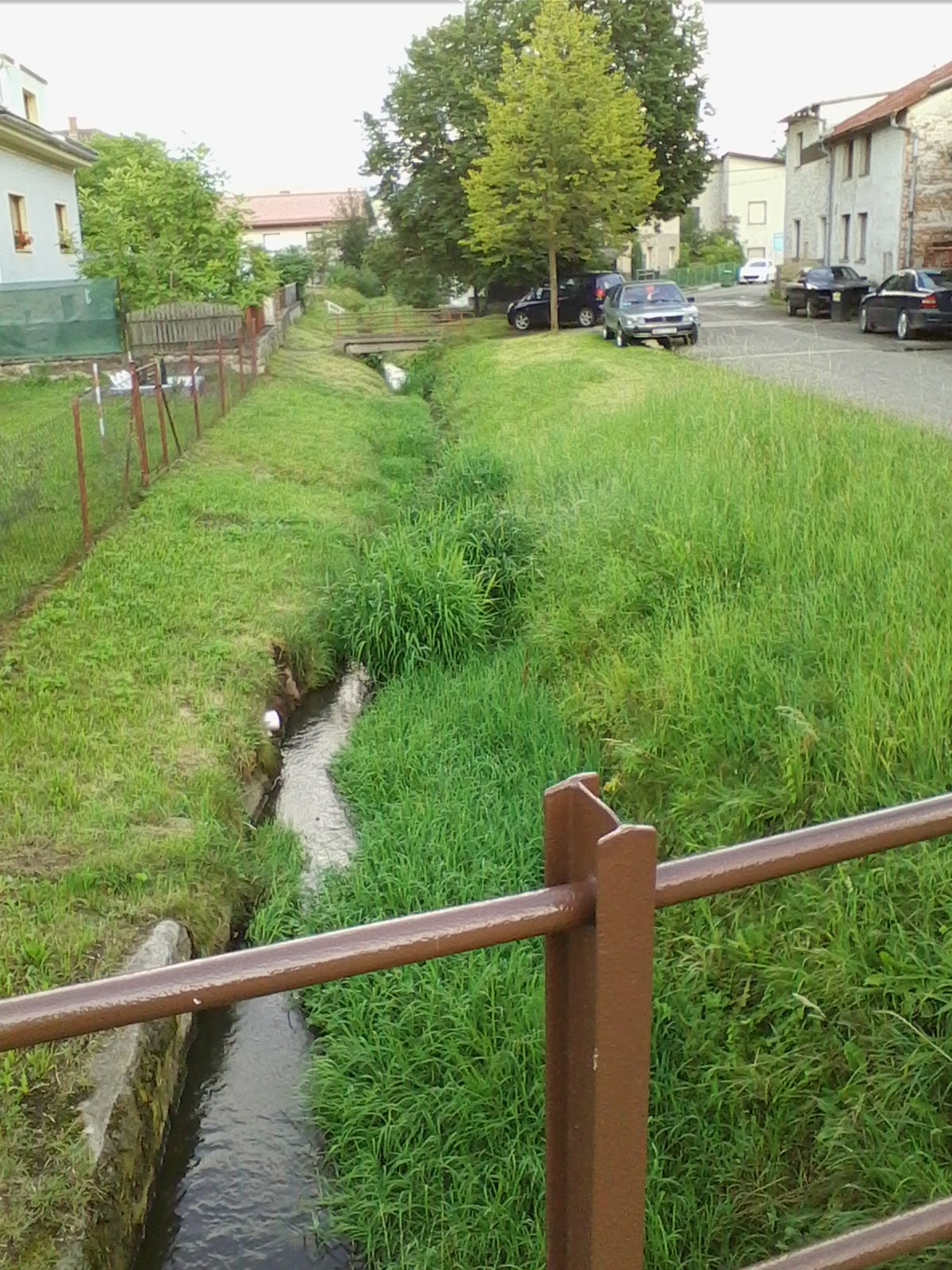
Zbečnický potok in Zbečník

Zbečník is located about 5 km from the border with Poland. The village lies on the border between the Broumov Highlands and Orlické Foothills. The highest point is the Maternice hill at 545 m (1,788 ft) above sea level. The 4.5 km-long brook of Zbečnický potok (a tributary of the Metuje) flows through the village. The village stretches along the main road in the Zbečnický potok valley.

== History ==
The first written mention of Zbečník is from 1422. It was probably founded together with a fortress on the hill Kvikov in the 14th or 15th century.

== See also ==
- Jírova hora
