= Všeobecné spiknutí =

1969 Czech novel by Egon Hostovský

First edition

The Plot (Czech: Všeobecné spiknutí) is a Czech psychological novel by Egon Hostovský. It was written in 1961 in New York and published in 1973 in Toronto, Canada. It was also published in Czech in 1969 by the Prague-based Melantrich publishing. It is a psychological novel whose narrator is an insecure hero who stumbles between reality and his imagination. The novel deals with the feelings of a Czech emigrant in New York, who has feelings of uprootedness, is haunted by a sense of guilt, misses home and, moreover, takes stock of his life after his 40th birthday. His inner state is very complex and he loses himself in society and in himself. He tries to find the truth and answers, which he eventually finds in his childhood.
