= Egon Hostovský =

Czech writer, editor and journalist (1908–1973)

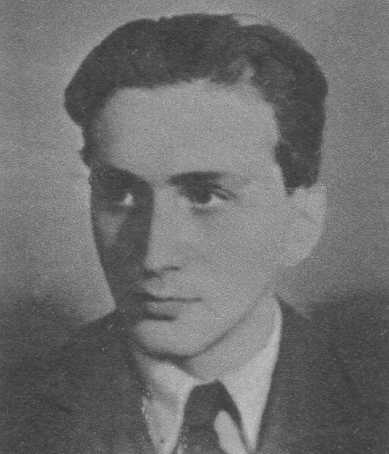
- Born: 23 April 1908; Hronov
- Died: 7 May 1973 (aged 65); Montclair, New Jersey
- Occupations: Novelist; Playwright; Journalist; Biographer

Egon Hostovský (23 April 1908 – 7 May 1973) was a Czech writer, editor and journalist.

== Biography ==
Born in Hronov to a Jewish family, Hostovský studied at the gymnasium in Náchod in 1927, then took up philosophy in Prague. He briefly attended the University of Vienna in 1929, but he did not graduate. He returned to Prague in 1930 and worked as an editor in several publishing houses.

In 1937, Hostovský joined the Ministry of Foreign Affairs and in 1939, he was sent on a tour of the Benelux countries. He was there when the German occupation of Czechoslovakia took place, so he settled in Paris. After Paris was occupied in 1940, he fled to Portugal and then, in 1941, he travelled to the United States, where he worked in New York City at the consulate of Czechoslovakia's government-in-exile. While there, his Jewish family was persecuted by the Nazis. His father, sisters, and their families died in the Nazi concentration camps.

After World War II, in 1946, he returned to Czechoslovakia and again worked at the Foreign Ministry, but in 1948, following the communist coup d'état, he began his second exile, first to Denmark, then to Norway and finally to the United States, where he worked as a Czech language teacher and later as a journalist and editor at Radio Free Europe. He remained there for the rest of his life and became a U.S. citizen in 1957.

He continued to write in Czech. Several of his novels, including The Midnight Patient and Three Nights, were translated in the late 1950s and early 1960s by Philip Hillyer Smith Jr., a scholar of linguistics and the Czech language.

After his 1973 death in Montclair, New Jersey, a literary prize, the Egon Hostovský Prize, was founded in his name by his third wife. Their son Paul (b. 1958) is a poet.

He was related to the Austrian-Jewish writer Stefan Zweig, whom he described as "a very distant relative". Some sources describe them as cousins.

== Works ==
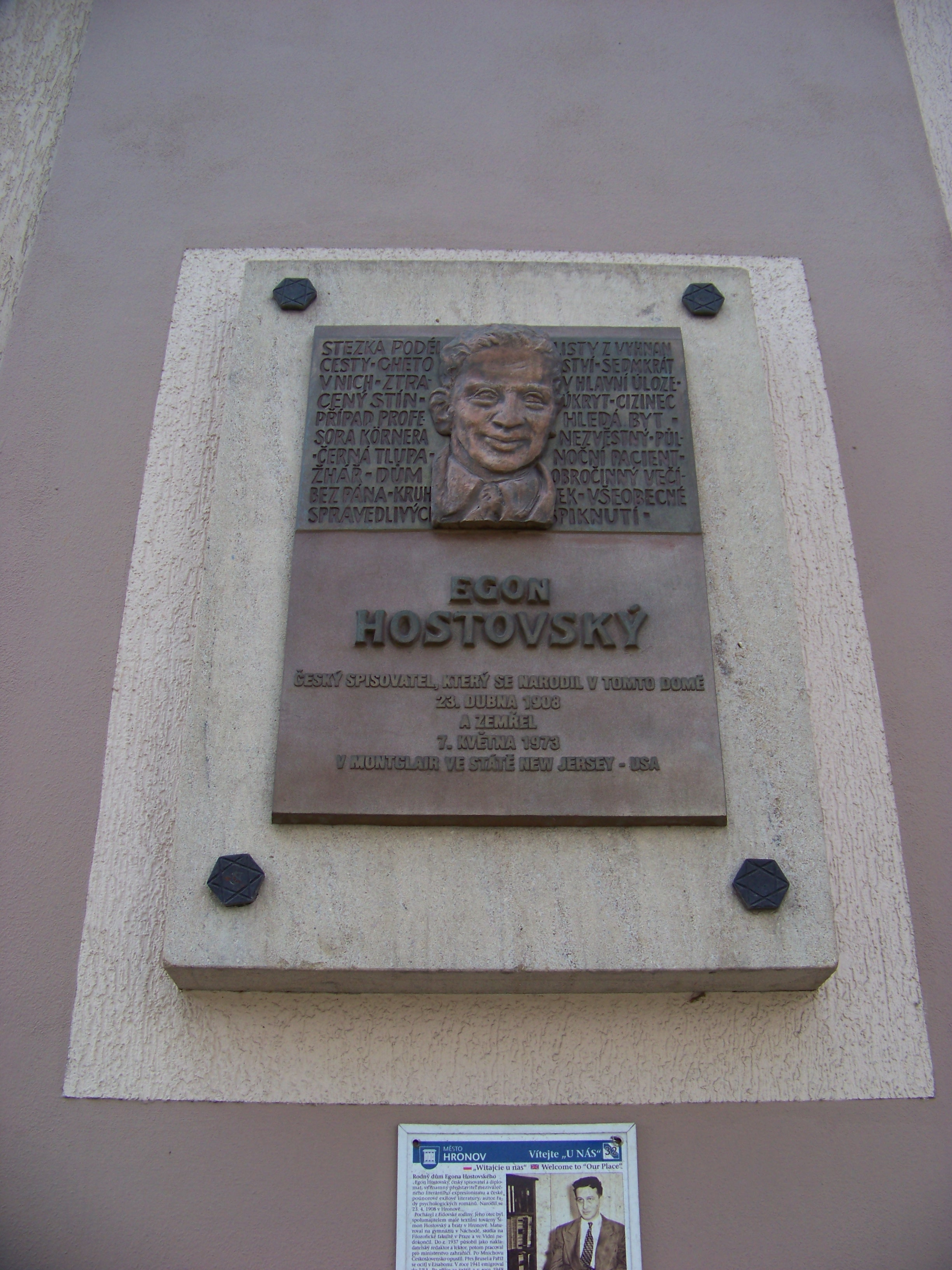
Monument to Hostovský in Hronov

His work is influenced by his Jewish origin and exile. His literary heroes fight (inner) evil, due to political situation are forced to leave their country and search for lost certainties and roots. Before his first emigration his work was influenced by expressionism.

- Zavřené dveře, 1926
- Stezka podél cesty, 1928 – psychological novel
- Ghetto v nich, Pokrok, Praha 1928
- Danajský dar, 1930
- Případ profesora Kornera, 1932
- Černá tlupa, 1933
- The Arsonist, from Czech (Žhář, 1935 / Melantrich, Praha 1948), by Christopher Morris, Twisted Spoon Press 1996.
- Dům bez pána, 1937
- Listy z vyhnanství, České Národní Sdružení v Americe, Chicago 1941
- Sedmkrát v hlavní úloze, New Yorkský Denník, New York 1942
- Úkryt, 1943
- The Hideout, from Czech (Úkryt) by Fern Long, Random House, New York 1945
- Seven times the leading man, from Czech (Sedmkrát v hlavní úloze) by Fern Long, Eyre & Spottiswoode, London 1945
- Cizinec hledá byt, 1947
- Osamělí buřiči, Lidové noviny, Brno 1948
- Manipulation of the Zhdanov line in Czechoslovakia, National Committee for a Free Europe, New York 1952
- Nezvěstný, 1951 / 1955
- The Midnight Patient, 1954, from Czech (Půlnoční pacient) by Alice Backer and Bernard Wolfe
- Dobročinný večírek, 1957
- The charity ball, from Czech (Dobročinný večírek) by Philip H. Smith Jr., Doubleday, Garden City N.Y. 1958
- Půlnoční pacient, 1959, (The Midnight Patient)
- The plot, from Czech (Všeobecné spiknutí) by Alice Backer and Bernard Wolfe, Doubleday, Garden City, N.Y. 1961
- Tři noci, Czechoslovak Society of Arts and Sciences in America, New York 1964
- Literární dobrodružství českého spisovatele v cizině (aneb o ctihodném povolání kouzla zbaveném), Nový domov, Toronto 1966
- Cizinci hledají byt, Odeon, Praha 1967
- Osvoboditel se vrací, Index, Köln 1972 – drama
- Všeobecné spiknutí, 1961 / Melantrich, Praha 1969 / 68 Publishers, Toronto 1973 – partly autobiographical, (The plot)
- Tři noci. Epidemie, ed. Olga Hostovská, Nakladatelství Franze Kafky, Praha 1997

His work is included in:

- Hundred towers: a Czechoslovak anthology of creative writing, L. B. Fischer, 1945
- The Jews of Czechoslovakia, Philadelphia and New York, 1971, pp-148-154: Hostovský contributed a chapter (“The Czech-Jewish Movement”).

References to him are made in the following books:

- Lexikon české literatury : osobnosti, díla, instituce, Vladimír Forst et al. Praha : Academia, 1993. 589pp. ISBN 80-200-0468-8.
