= Mezi proudy =

Novel series by Alois Jirásek

Mezi proudy (English: Between the Currents) is a trilogy of Czech novels, written by Alois Jirásek. It was published between 1891 and 1909, and it is composed of Mezi proudy (Between the Currents), Proti všem (Against All the World, 1894) and Bratrstvo (Brotherhood, 1900–1909).
