= Paula Gans =

Czech painter

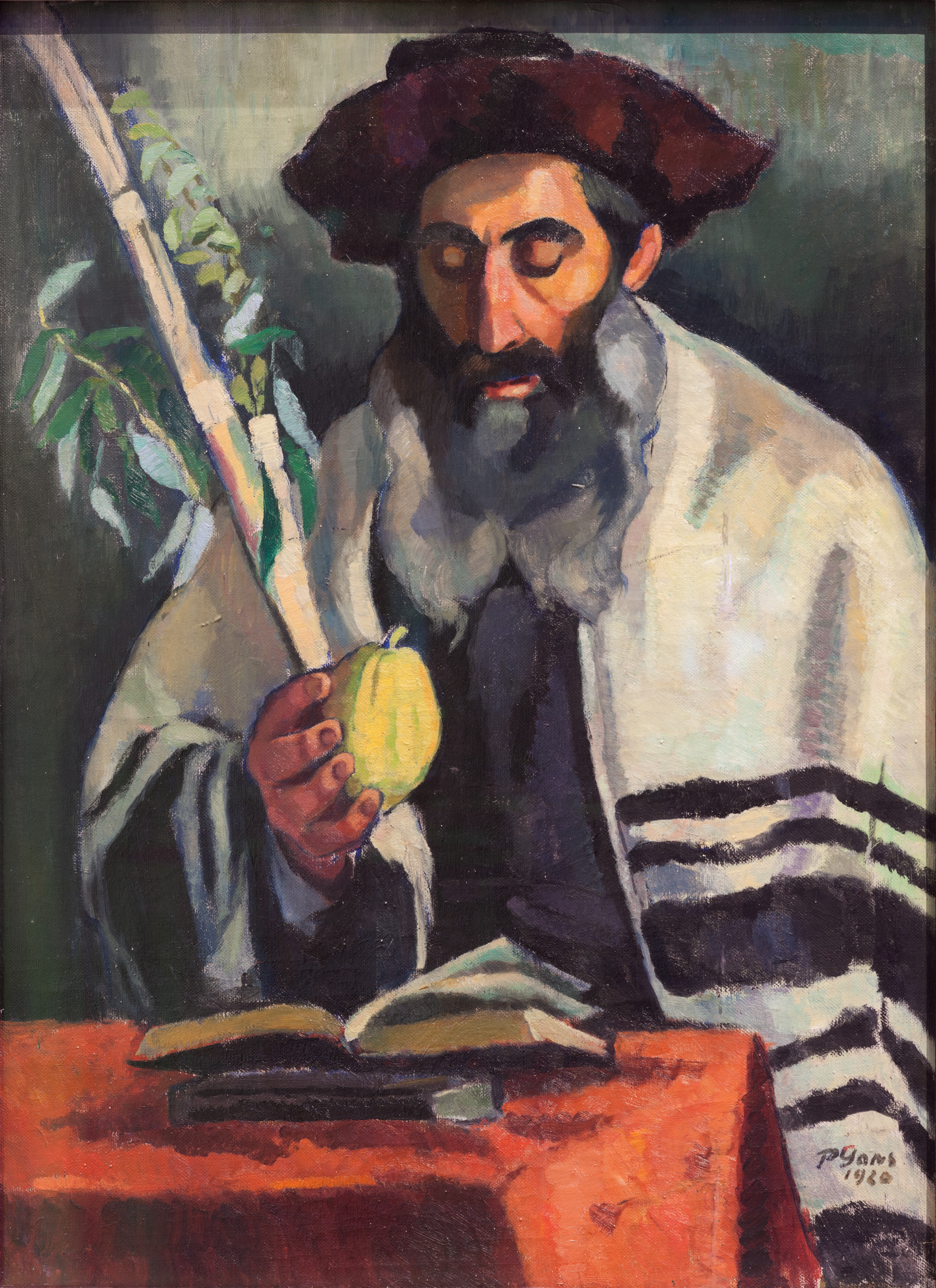
Im Gebet beim Laubhüttenfest (In prayer at Sukkot) by Paula Gans (1920)

Paula Gans (9 May 1883 – 7 November 1941) was a Czech painter of still lifes, portraits and nudes.

== Biography ==
Paula Gans was born the daughter of Ignaz Gans and his wife Johanna in Hronov, Bohemia on 9 May 1883. Nothing is known about her childhood and youth. Gans passed the state examination for English languages in Vienna. In 1920 she emigrated to Hamburg with her older brother Richard. The siblings lived together in a house that Richard had bought before. Soon after her arrival she became friends with the painter Hertha Spielberg and shared a studio with her in the Curiohaus in Rothenbaumchaussee 15. Through Spielberg, Gans got to know other Hamburg artists, including the painter Gertrud Schaeffer and the photographer Charlotte Rudolf; both temporarily worked in the studio in Rothenbaumchaussee.

In 1932 Gans and Spielberg travelled together to Paris and southern France. Gans was also active as a portraitist at the beginning of the 1930s. Among others she portrayed the pianist Wilhelm Barg and the artist Gertrud Schaeffer.

Gans's landscapes, nudes and still lifes show a strong influence by the French Impressionists. Her most important work, In prayer at Sukkot, was created in 1920. It is the only reference to her Jewish origin in her artistic work. Today the painting is exhibited in the Hamburg Museum.

== Persecution ==
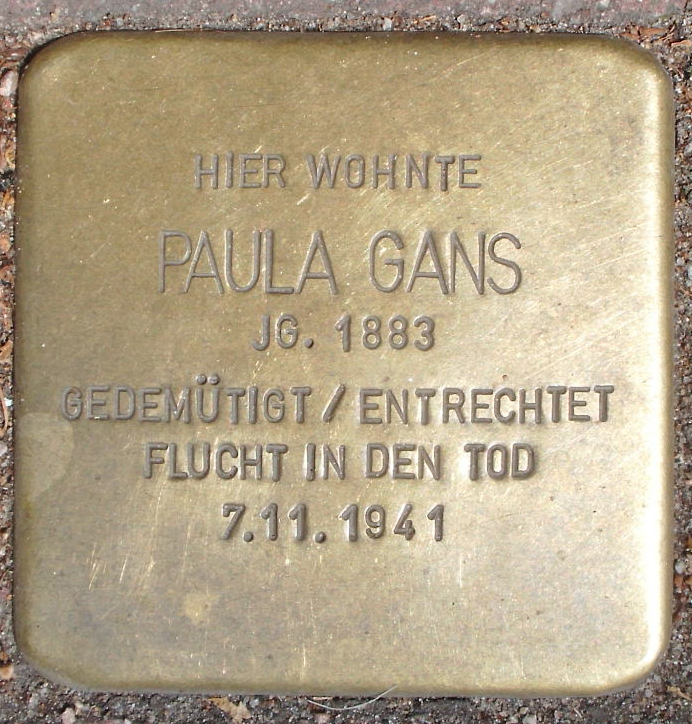
Stolperstein for Paula Gans: Here lived Paula Gans. Born in 1883. Humiliated/Disenfranchised. Escaped to death. 7 November 1941

As a Jew, life in Hamburg became more and more difficult for Gans. For example, her assets were frozen. The Hamburgische Künstlerschaft (Hamburg Artists) was brought into line by the National Socialists and Paula Gans was expelled in April 1933. Gans was still a Czechoslovak citizen, but with the establishment of the Protectorate of Bohemia and Moravia, this could no longer protect her.

In November 1941, Paula and Richard Gans received the order to be deported to the Minsk Ghetto, scheduled for 8 November. The day before, on 7 November 1941, Paula Gans committed suicide. Her brother was killed in Minsk in the same year. As a memento, two Stolpersteine were laid in front of their former home.

Most of her works were only discovered in 1977 in the estate of Hertha Spielberg.

== Literature ==
- Arno Herzig, Saskia Rohde: Die Juden in Hamburg 1590 bis 1990: wissenschaftliche Beiträge der Universität Hamburg zur Ausstellung „Vierhundert Jahre Juden in Hamburg“ (The Jews in Hamburg from 1590 to 1990: scientific contributions of the University of Hamburg to the exhibition "Four Hundred Years of Jews in Hamburg".). Dölling & Galitz, Hamburg 1991, ISBN 978-3-926174-30-7, p. 357
- Maike Bruhns: Kunst in der Krise (Art in crisis), Vol. 2. Dölling & Galitz, Hamburg 2001, ISBN 978-3-933374-93-6. p. 148
