= Statue of Alois Jirásek, Prague =

Statue in Prague, Czech Republic

Statue of Alois Jirásek
- Pomník Aloise Jiráska (Czech)
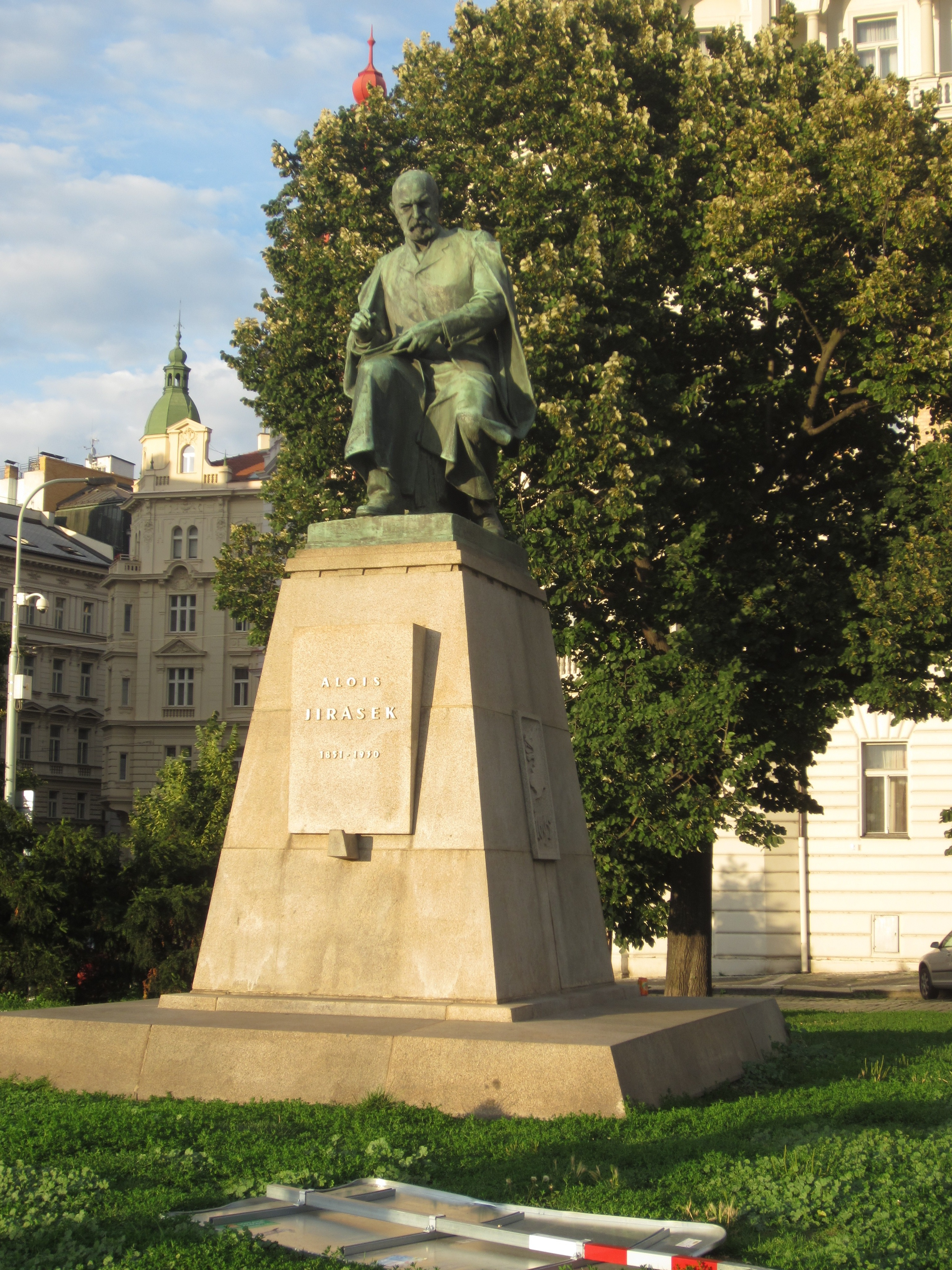
- The statue in 2014
- Type: Sculpture
- Location: Prague, Czech Republic; 50°4′33.35″N 14°24′51.64″E

The statue of Alois Jirásek (Czech: Pomník Aloise Jiráska) is an outdoor sculpture by Karel Pokorný and Jaroslav Fragner, installed in Prague, Czech Republic.
