= Bratrstvo =

Book by Alois Jirásek

- Author: Alois Jirásek

The Brethren (in Czech Bratrstvo) is a Czech novel trilogy, written by Alois Jirásek. The main characters of book are the Czech warlords John Jiskra of Brandýs and John Talafus, who fought in present-day Slovakia against Hungarian Duke John Hunyadi.
