= The Brethren (Haggard novel) =

1904 novel by H. Rider Haggard

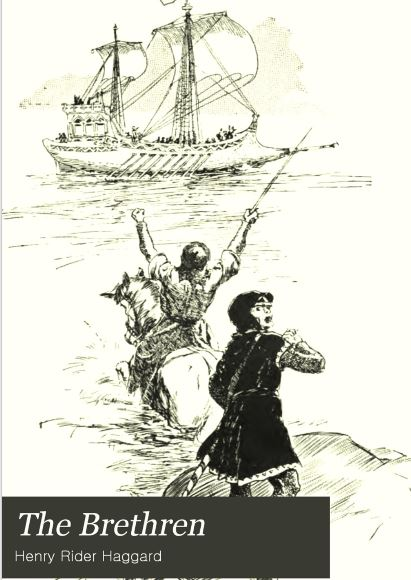
- Author: H. Rider Haggard
- Language: English
- Publisher: Cassell & Co (UK); McClure, Phillips (US)
- Publication date: 1904
- Publication place: United Kingdom

The Brethren: A Tale of the Crusades is a 1904 historical novel by H. Rider Haggard set during the Third Crusade. The Brethren features Saladin and the Order of Assassins as characters.

== Background ==
In the author’s note, Haggard writes that the work was inspired by his visit to the Hill of Hattin, near the Sea of Galilee, considering its importance as the site of both the Sermon on the Mount and where, a millennia later, Saladin defeated the Crusaders in the Battle of Hattin.

== Modern criticism ==
Robert Irwin dismissed The Brethern as "Haggard's preposterous farrago". Irwin also criticized the novel's depiction of chivalry, saying that in The Brethern "Chivalry and the public-school ethos are hardly distinguishable."
