= Ida Gerding Athens =

American poet

- Born: Ida Bird Gerding; February 23, 1882; Cleves, Ohio, U.S.
- Died: November 4, 1977 (aged 95); Cincinnati, Ohio, U.S.
- Occupations: Author, poet
- Spouse: William Wilson Athens II
- Writing career
- Language: English
- Genre: Poetry
- Notable works: Brethren (1940), John three, sixteen (1959)
- Notable awards: Included in Who's Who of African American Writers

Ida Gerding Athens (born Ida Bird Gerding, February 23, 1882 – November 4, 1977) was an American author. She wrote a collection of poetry titled Brethren.

Born in Cleves, Ohio, she came from a poor German-American family.

She was included in the Who's Who of African American Writers because of her candid comments on racial tension in the United States, perhaps inspired by her own low socio-economic background. Her poetry from the 1930s was discussed by James Edward Smethurst in The New Red Negro: The Literary Left and African-American Poetry, 1930–1946, together with that of Lucy Mae Turner, Frank Marshall Davis, Waring Cuney, Richard Wright and Countée Cullen. Smethurst notes that Gerding Athens appeared to be separated from the mainstream of left-wing African-American literature yet "manifested important thematic and formal concerns" in her poetry that he considers characteristic of 1930s–40s African-American poetry.

She was supposedly influential in choosing the geranium as Ohio's state flower.

She married William Wilson Athens II on December 23, 1917, as his second wife. She died in Cincinnati, Ohio.

== Publications ==
- Brethren, 1940
- John three, sixteen, 1959
