= Hronov =

- Town
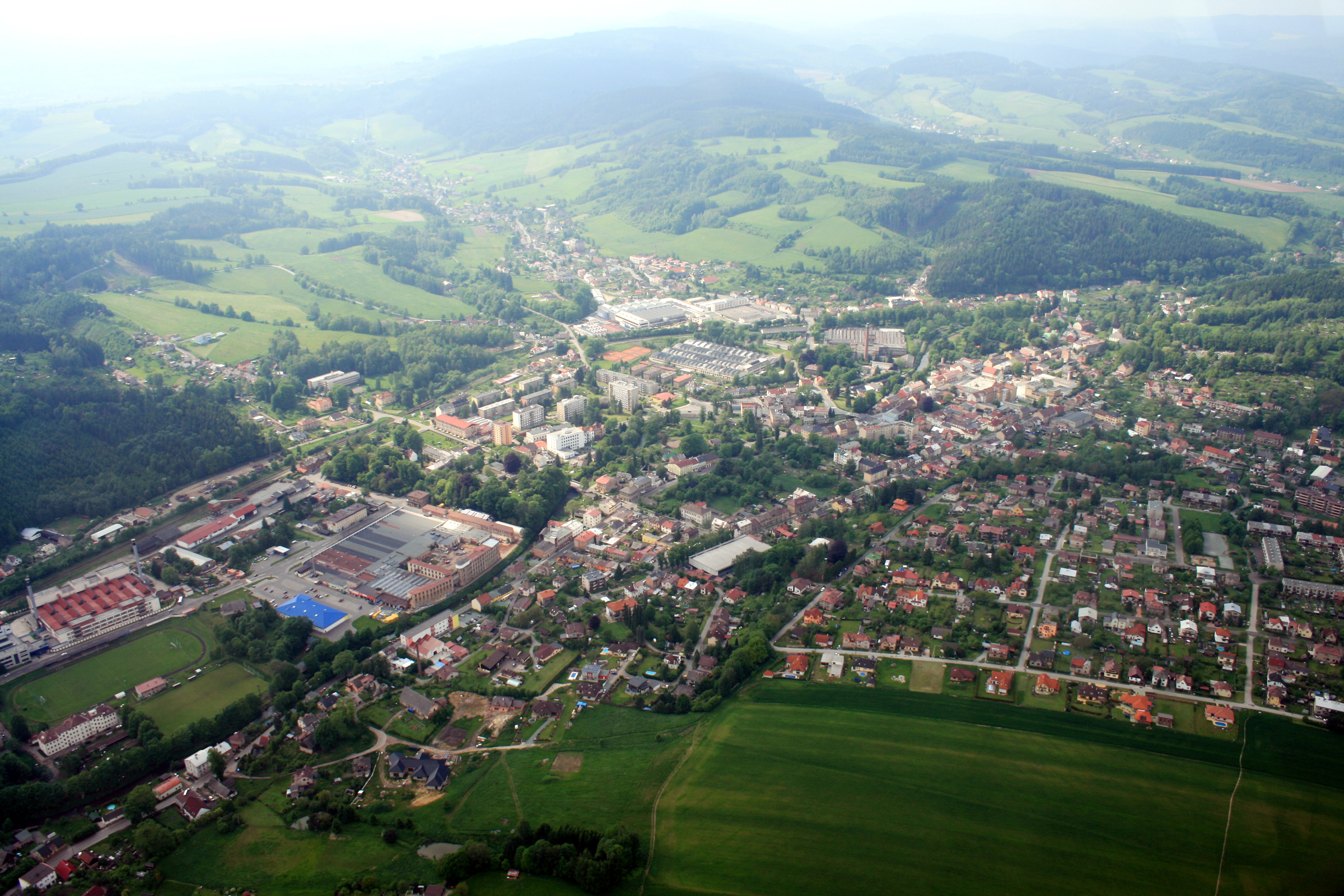
- Aerial view

- Coat of arms

- Location in the Czech Republic
- Coordinates: 50°28′47″N 16°10′57″E
- Country: Czech Republic
- Region: Hradec Králové
- District: Náchod
- First mentioned: 1359

Government
  - Mayor: Petr Koleta (ANO)

Area
  - Total: 22.04 km^{2} (8.51 sq mi)
- Elevation: 364 m (1,194 ft)

Population (2026-01-01)
  - Total: 6,063
  - Density: 275.1/km^{2} (712.5/sq mi)
- Time zone: UTC+1 (CET)
  - Summer (DST): UTC+2 (CEST)
- Postal codes: 549 31, 549 34
- Website: www.mestohronov.cz

Hronov (Czech pronunciation: [ˈɦronof]) is a town in Náchod District in the Hradec Králové Region of the Czech Republic. It has about 6,100 inhabitants. The town is located on the Metuje River, on the border of the Orlické Foothills and Broumov Highlands.

Hronov was founded in the 13th century and became a town in 1859. The town is known as the birthplace of writer Alois Jirásek and artist Josef Čapek.

== Administrative division ==
Hronov consists of six municipal parts (in brackets population according to the 2021 census):

- Hronov (3,756)
- Malá Čermná (134)
- Rokytník (274)
- Velký Dřevíč (694)
- Žabokrky (150)
- Zbečník (1,008)

Malá Čermná forms an exclave of the municipal territory.

== Etymology ==
Hronov was named after its founder, Hron of Náchod.

== Geography ==
Hronov is located about 7 kilometres (4 mi) north of Náchod and 38 km (24 mi) northeast of Hradec Králové. The Malá Čermná exclave lies on the border with Poland. Most of the municipal territory lies in the Broumov Highlands, but the southern part with the town proper lies in the Orlické Foothills. The highest point is the Turov hill at 603 m (1,978 ft) above sea level.

Hronov is situated on the Metuje River. The Hronovka and Regnerka mineral springs are in Hronov.

== History ==
The first written mention of Hronov is from 1359. It was founded during the colonisation of this territory between 1241 and 1285. In 1415, Hronov is referred to as a market town. Until 1848, it was part of the Náchod estate. In 1859, it was promoted to a town.

In 1949, the neighbouring municipalities of Velké Poříčí, Zbečník, Velký Dřevíč, Rokytník and Žabokrky were merged with Hronov. In 1960, Malá Čermná joined Hronov. In 1990, Velké Poříčí became again a separate municipality.

== Demographics ==
Historical population

Year	Pop.	±%
1869	4,488	—
1880	4,719	+5.1%
1890	5,493	+16.4%
1900	7,248	+31.9%
1910	9,004	+24.2%

Year	Pop.	±%
1921	7,786	−13.5%
1930	8,215	+5.5%
1950	7,315	−11.0%
1961	7,374	+0.8%
1970	7,404	+0.4%

Year	Pop.	±%
1980	7,189	−2.9%
1991	6,653	−7.5%
2001	6,519	−2.0%
2011	6,247	−4.2%
2021	6,016	−3.7%

Source: Censuses

== Transport ==
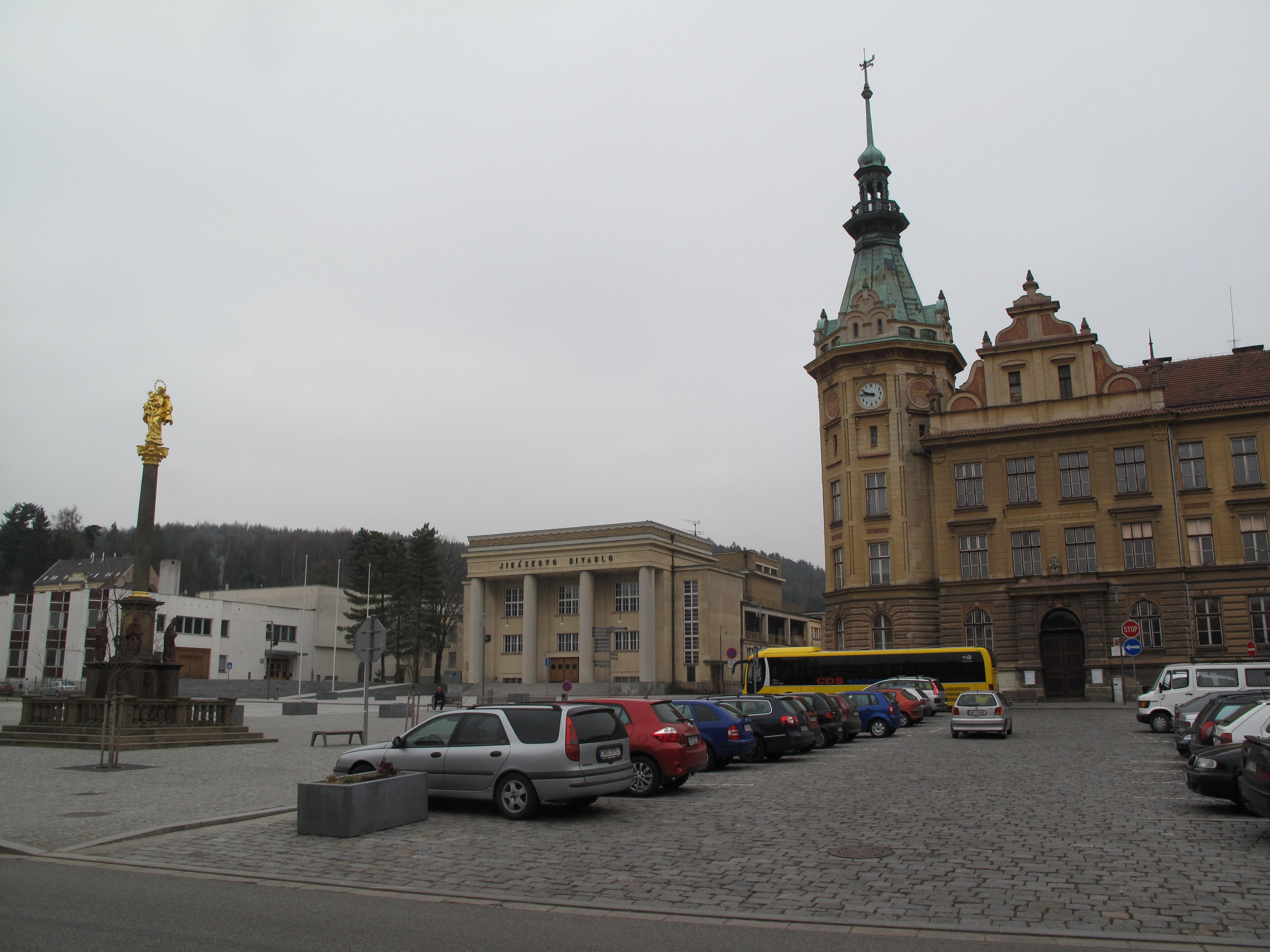
Centre of Hronov

Hronov is located on the railway lines Broumov–Starkoč and Hronov–Choceň.

On the border with Poland is the pedestrian border crossing Malá Čermná / Czermna.

== Culture ==
The Jiráskův Hronov festival of amateur theatre takes place here every year. The festival is named after the significant Czech writer and local native Alois Jirásek.

== Sights ==
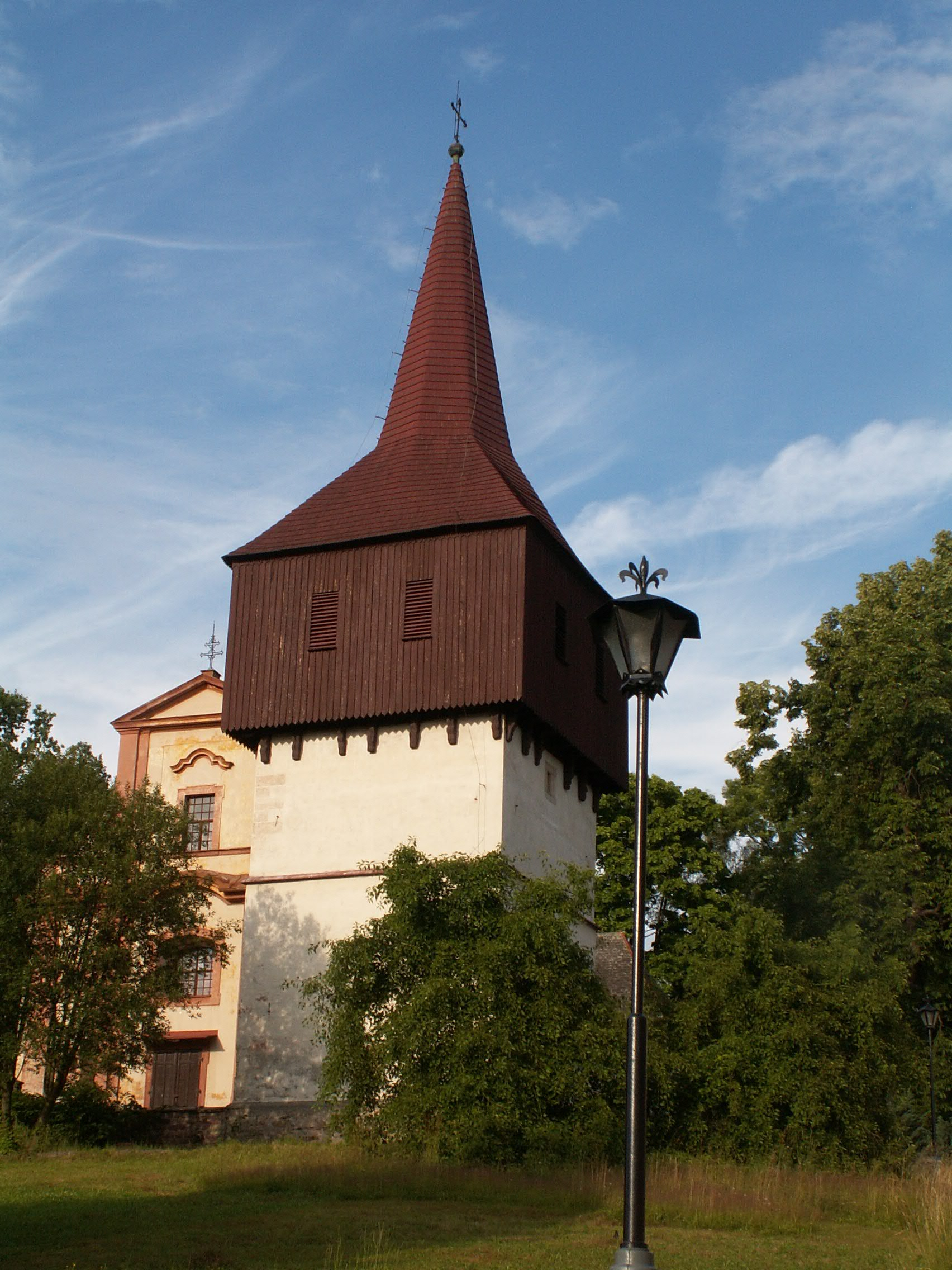
Bell tower

The main landmark of the town centre is the theatre that bears the name of Alois Jirásek. It was opened in 1930. The birthplace of Jirásek is a house from the 18th century and is a preserved example of folk architecture.

The oldest monument in Hronov is the Church of All Saints. The originally Gothic church was rebuilt in the Baroque style in 1713–1717 and 1736. The late Renaissance bell tower was built in 1610.

== Notable people ==
- Alois Jirásek (1851–1930), writer, author of historical novels and plays
- Paula Gans (1883–1941), painter
- Josef Čapek (1887–1945), painter, writer and poet
- Egon Hostovský (1908–1973), writer, editor and journalist

== Twin towns – sister cities ==
Hronov is twinned with:

- Bielawa, Poland
- Kudowa-Zdrój, Poland
- Nowa Ruda (rural gmina), Poland
- Warrington, England, United Kingdom
