= Alois Jirásek =

Czech writer, author, and playwright

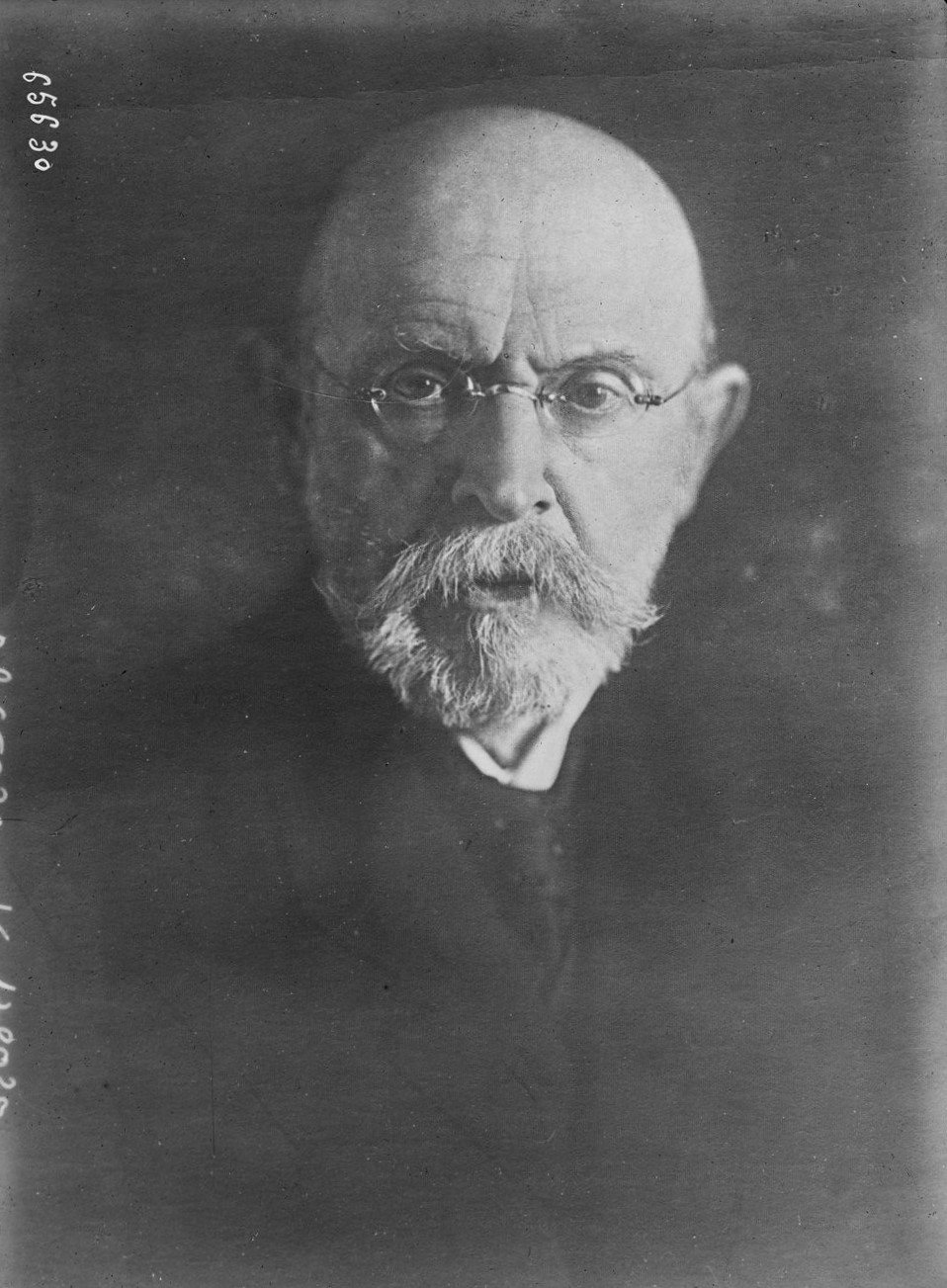
- Jirásek in 1921
- Born: 23 August 1851; Hronov, Bohemia, Austrian Empire
- Died: 12 March 1930 (aged 78); Prague, Czechoslovakia
- Resting place: Hronov
- Occupations: Writer, politician
- Writing career
- Genre: Literary realism
- Notable works: Staré pověsti české; Mezi proudy; Proti všem; Bratrstvo; Temno; Psohlavci; F. L. Věk

Alois Jirásek (Czech pronunciation: [ˈalojs ˈjɪraːsɛk]) (23 August 1851 – 12 March 1930) was a Czech writer, author of historical novels and plays. Jirásek was a high school history teacher in Litomyšl and later in Prague until his retirement in 1909. He wrote a series of historical novels imbued with faith in his nation and in progress toward freedom and justice. He was close to many important Czech personalities like Mikoláš Aleš, Josef Václav Sládek, Karel Václav Rais or Zdeněk Nejedlý. He attended an art club in Union Cafe with them. He worked as an editor in Zvon magazine and was nominated for the Nobel Prize in Literature in 1918, 1919, 1921 and 1930.

== Biography ==
Alois Jirásek was born on 23 August 1851 in Hronov, in the Kingdom of Bohemia (modern-day Czech Republic), which was at that time part of the Austrian Empire. He was born into a family of small farmers and weavers of modest means. His father was Josef Jirásek (1822–1901) who worked as a weaver at first and then as a baker. His mother's name was Vincencie Jirásková, née Prouzová (1821–1887). Alois had eight siblings: Helena, Josef, Emília, Rudolf, Žofie, Božena, Adolf and Antonín. He attended German Benedictine High School in Broumov (1863–1867), and Czech High School in Hradec Králové (1867–71). He then studied history at the Charles University (1871–74). After finishing his studies he moved back to Litomyšl where he taught history. He also wrote his first important works (The Philosophers' Story or Psohlavci). On 11 August 1879 he married Marie Podhajská. They had eight children together, seven daughters, including the painter Božena Jelínková-Jirásková and one son.

In 1888 they moved to Prague. They were not satisfied with their first two apartments. But, after five years they finally found the perfect one on Ressl street, close to today's Jirasek square, where a memorial to Alois is located. They lived in this apartment from 1903 until his death in 1930. He continued in his career as a high-school teacher in Prague as well as writing literary works. Living in Prague gave him the opportunity to meet members of the artistic and scientific world. He started meeting Mikoláš Aleš with whom he shared the same artistic ideas and plans. He became friends with Zikmund Winter, K.V. Rais, but also with the younger generation including Josef Svatopluk Machar and Zdeněk Nejedlý. All of his dramas were written in Prague. On 3 July 1908 he was elected a member of Czech Academy of Arts and Sciences.

He retired in 1909 and dedicated most of his time to literature. He often visited his home town Hronov, but he also travelled around Europe which he wrote about in some of his works. He visited Chodsko, Dresden, Italy, Slovakia and Bled.

In 1917 he was one of the first to sign the Manifesto of Czech writers, which was an important proclamation that supported political efforts to have an independent country for Czechs. On 28 October 1918 Izidor Zahradník and Alois took part in the reading of the declaration of Czechoslovakia's independence. On 21 December 1918 Alois greeted Tomáš Masaryk with a speech and met with him on many occasions.

Charles University awarded Alois an honorary PhD in 1919. The high school in Ressl street changed its name to Jirasek High School. He became a member of parliament in the Revolutionary National Assembly of the Czechoslovak Republic. In 1920 he became a senator in the National Assembly. He was a senator until 1925. In parliament he sat for the Czechoslovak National Democracy party.

He continued his political career until he was unable to write anymore due to illness. In September 1921 he left the Roman Catholic Church; he was still a Christian, but never entered another Church. In the years 1918, 1919, 1921 and 1930 he was nominated for the Nobel Prize in Literature.

On 12 March 1930 he died in Prague and was buried in his home town, Hronov. On 15 March, the night before his funeral, there was a memorial service in front of the National Museum in Prague. Karel Kramář and František Soukup each gave a speech there. A national funeral took place in the National Museum. Since Alois was no longer a member of any church, the Catholic Church forbid ringing church bells in Prague. There was no priest at his funeral. T.G. Masaryk, many politicians, college professors, and diplomats attended his funeral. Ivan Dérer, Jaroslav Kvapil and Rudolf Medek each gave a speech at it. After the cremation they moved the urn to Hronov, but they stopped in many Czech cities. The last part of the funeral took place in Hronov. There were no church bells ringing; mourners could hear famous pieces by J.B. Foerster.

Jirásek is one of the most important Czech writers. He used historical details to describe the age he was writing about. The characters in his books are history makers. He described the social events of his day.

== Bibliography ==
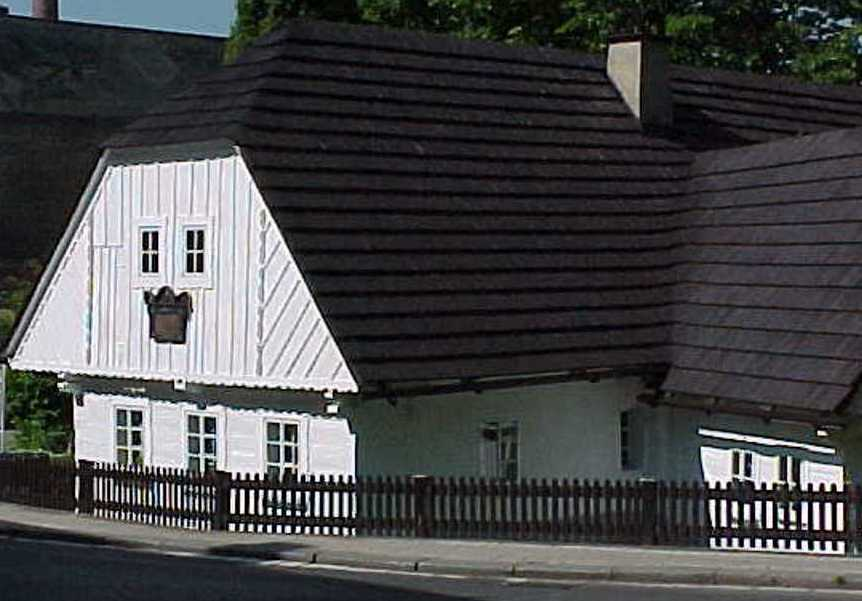
House where Alois Jirasek was born

Alois Jirásek began his career with verses written in a nationalistic and patriotic style. His prose works reflected the reality of contemporary countrysides. He began to write in the 1870s but was still active in the 1920s.

His first large work was an historical novel Skaláci (1875). The last work was a novel Husistký král that was never finished.

For more than 50 years he wrote stories — Povídka z hor 1878, Z bouřlivých dob 1879, Rozmanitá próza. His first story was Poklad (1873).

The range of the historical events in Jirasek's works is very comprehensive. It includes mythical periods (Staré pověsti české 1894) that are read by the young for its verses. He also wrote ballads, and romances, which were sough out by publishers, illustrators, and then by filmmakers (Filosofická historie 1888, Maryla 1885, Zahořanský hon 1889, Balda z rokoka 1905). He wrote novels V cizích službách (1885) and Psohlavci (1884). He was also the author of many chronicles. They recorded the changes in Bohemia from the beginning of the Hussites (Mezi proudy I-III 1887–1890, Proti všem 1893, Bratrstvo I-III 1900-1909), through the recatholization pressure (Temno 1913), and the uprising of the Kingdom of Bohemia in the 18th century (F. L. Věk I-V 1906, U nás I-IV 1896-1903).

Successful dramas from contemporary villages contributed to the support of realism on the stage (Vojnarka 1890, Otec 1894). Emigrant (1898) was an historical drama; it had three parts: Jan Hus, Jan Žižka, Jan Roháč.

=== Novels ===
- Staré pověsti české (1894) – corps of legends from forefather Čech, through Prince Perios, the Hussites, to the period of Battle of White Mountain

==== Hussites ====
- Mezi proudy (Between the Currents) (1887–1890) – about the Hussites, main characters– Hus, Žižka, Václav IV., and archbishop Jan z Jenštejna
- Proti všem (Against the Whole World) (1893) – about the Hussites, the building of Tábor, and the battle of Vítkov.
- Bratrstvo (Brotherhood) (1900–1909) – a three-part novel about the decline of the Hussites after the Battle of Lipany and about leaving their army to Slovakia under the control of Jan Jiskra z Brandýsa
- Husitský král (The Hussite King) (1920–1930) – novel, the main character is Jiří z Poděbrad represented as a strong ruler, (Alois intended it to be a trilogy but he could not finished it due to his illness, only the first two parts were published and the final part was unwritten at the time of the author's demise.)
- Z Čech až na konec světa (From Bohemia to the End of the World) (1888) – about the diplomatic mission of Jiří z Poděbrad
- Slavný den (The Day of Fame) (1879) – novel set in the years 1419-1420 that includes the era of the death of Václav IV.
- Konec a počátek (The End and the Beginning) (1879) – novel set in the years 1452-1453 taking place in the castle at Litice; where Václav Koranda the Elder is imprisoned, and describes the demise of campism and the emergence of the Fraternal Unity
- Zemanka (1885) – a story from the age after the Battle of Lipany about fate love of Eliška to Laurin
- V cizích službách (In Foreign Services) (1883) –a novel happening set in the 16th century in the era of Vladislav Jagellonský that shows the tragic destinies of descendants of Taborites
- Maryla (1885) – love story from the era of Poděbradská

==== The White Mountain ====
- Temno (1913–1915; meaning Darkness) – the era of the greatest oppression of the Czech nation. Spiritual life was controlled by the Catholic Church - the Jesuits; non-Catholic people had secret meetings and read the Bible and other forbidden literature. For that they were persecuted by the Jesuits. Temno became the most famous Czech book during the First World War.
- Psohlavci (The Heads of the Hounds) (1884) – novel that takes place in the 17th century
- Skaláci (The Rock Climbers) (1875) – about the peasant rebellion in 1775
- Skály (The Rocks) (1886) – about The Thirty Years' War. Talks about the Křinecká family from Ronov.
- Na dvoře vévodském (In the Duke's Court) (1877) – a novel that describes the Enlightenment atmosphere at the Náchod castle in the last quarter of the 18th century and the efforts of patriots to abolish robots.
- Ráj světá (The Holy Paradise) (1880) – a novel whose plot is set in Vienna and in terms of time and some of the characters follows the novel In the Duke's Court; it is a detailed painting of the delightful life at the Congress of Vienna .

==== The Revival ====
- F. L. Věk (1888–1906) – five-part novel, the main character is František Ladislav Věk from Dobruška. The aim was to show the process of Czech National Revival in Prague and in Dobruška. Historical personalities include: Václav Thám, Václav Matěj Kramerius
- U nás (1896–1903) – four-part chronicle (Úhor, Novina, Osetek, Zeměžluč) taking place in Náchod and Hronov (Padolí), the main character is a priest.
- Filosofská historie (Philosophical History) (1878) – about the lives of students living in Litomyšl and about fights in Prague in 1848.
- Zahořanský hon (1889)
- Balada z rokoka (The Ballad of Rococo) (1905)

==== Plays ====
- Kolébka (1891) – comedy, set in the age of Václav IV.
- Emigrant (1898) – drama set in 1741 in Police nad Metují
- M. D. Rettigová (1901) – drama
- Gero (1904) – tragedy
- Lucerna (1905) – a drama that connects the real world with tales.
- Vojnarka (1890) – tragedy of old love that was never fulfilled
- Otec (1894) – drama about envy and greed
- Samota (1908) – drama
- Zkouška (1894) – a drama that takes place around Litomyšl
- Pan Johanes (1909) – tale

== See also ==
- List of Czech writers
- Statue of Alois Jirásek, Prague

== Sources ==
- Gilman, D. C.; Peck, H. T.; Colby, F. M., eds. (1905). "Jirásek, Alois" . New International Encyclopedia (1st ed.). New York: Dodd, Mead.
- Hrbkova, Šárka B. (1920). Czechoslovak Stories. Duffield (original from the Princeton University). pp. 221. "Alois Jirásek born in hronov."
