= Sacrificium (album) =

Studio album by Xandria
- Released: 2 May 2014
- Studio: Sandlane Recording Facilities, The Netherlands; Gate Studios, Germany
- Genre: Symphonic metal, power metal
- Length: 66:21
- Label: Napalm
- Producer: Marco Heubaum, Joost van den Broek

Xandria chronology
Neverworld's End (2012)	Sacrificium (2014)	Fire & Ashes (2015)

Singles from Sacrificium
- 1. "Dreamkeeper" Released: 4 April 2014; 2. "Nightfall" Released: 24 April 2014

Professional ratings
Review scores
Source	Rating
Metal Underground	5/5 stars
My Global Mind	9/10

Sacrificium is the sixth studio album by German symphonic metal band Xandria. The record was released on 2 May 2014 via Napalm Records.

In Latin, the word sacrificium means the performance of an act that renders something sacer, sacred. Sacrifice reinforced the powers and attributes of divine beings, and inclined them to render benefits in return (the principle of do ut des).

== Background ==
According to the band, the new album will "continue the musical journey and direction" of their last album, Neverworld's End, but "will bring in even more of everything people liked" about it.

Right before recording began, the band parted ways with their singer of three years, Manuela Kraller. She was replaced by Dutch singer Dianne van Giersbergen, who also fronts the progressive metal band, Ex Libris. This record is also the first album to feature Steven Wussow on bass.

== Track listing ==
All tracks are written by Marco Heubaum (except where noted).

Standard & mediabook edition – CD 1
No.	Title	Lyrics	Music	Length
1.	"Sacrificium"		Marco Heubaum, Benjamin Schwenen	10:04
2.	"Nightfall"		Marco Heubaum, Benjamin Schwenen, Christian Steenken	3:54
3.	"Dreamkeeper"			4:36
4.	"Stardust"			5:31
5.	"The Undiscovered Land"			7:22
6.	"Betrayer"			6:04
7.	"Until the End"			5:37
8.	"Come with Me"		Marco Heubaum, Benjamin Schwenen, Christian Steenken	4:56
9.	"Little Red Relish"	Dianne van Giersbergen		4:32
10.	"Our Neverworld"			3:44
11.	"Temple of Hate"			5:48
12.	"Sweet Atonement"	Dianne van Giersbergen	Marco Heubaum, Nicolas Rebscher, Alexander Kim Lange	4:13
Total length:				66:21

Mediabook edition – CD 2
No.	Title	Music	Length
1.	"The Watcher" (bonus track)		4:43
2.	"Sacrificium" (instrumental)	Marco Heubaum, Benjamin Schwenen	10:04
3.	"Nightfall" (instrumental)	Marco Heubaum, Benjamin Schwenen, Christian Steenken	3:54
4.	"Dreamkeeper" (instrumental)		4:36
5.	"Stardust" (instrumental)		5:31
6.	"The Undiscovered Land" (instrumental)		7:25
7.	"Betrayer" (instrumental)		6:04
8.	"Until the End" (instrumental)		5:37
9.	"Come with Me" (instrumental)	Marco Heubaum, Benjamin Schwenen, Christian Steenken	4:55
10.	"Little Red Relish" (instrumental)		4:33
11.	"Our Neverworld" (instrumental)		3:44
12.	"Temple of Hate" (instrumental)		5:48
13.	"Sweet Atonement" (instrumental)	Marco Heubaum, Nicolas Rebscher, Alexander Kim Lange	4:13
Total length:			71:07

== Charts ==
Chart (2014)	Peak position
Austrian Albums Chart	71
German Albums Chart	25
Swiss Albums Chart	48
UK Albums Chart	176
UK Independent Albums (Official Charts)	34
UK Rock & Metal Albums (Official Charts)	10
US Top Heatseekers	25

== Personnel ==
All information from the album booklet.

Xandria

- Dianne van Giersbergen – vocals
- Marco Heubaum – guitar, producer
- Philip Restemeier – guitar
- Steven Wussow – bass
- Gerit Lamm – drums

Additional musicians

- Amanda Somerville – narration
- Mark Burnash – narration
- Ben Mathot – violin
- McAlbi – tin whistle, low whistle
- Johannes Schiefner – bagpipes
- Jonas Pap – cello
- PAdam Chamber Choir – choir

Choir

- Maria van Nieukerken – choir conductor
- Annette Stallinga, Annette Vermeulen, Karen Langendonk, Marie Anne Jacobs, Angus van Grevenbroek, Gijs Klunder, Jan Douwes, Alfrun Schmid, Annemieke Nuijten, Aukje Vergeest, Frederique Klooster, Martha Bosch, Daan Verlaan, Koert Braches, Ruben de Grauw

Production

- Joost van den Broek – producer, recording, engineering, keyboards, programming
- Stefan Heilemann – artwork, layout, photography
- Arne Wiegand – engineering assistant
- Jos Driessen – engineering assistant
- Sascha Paeth – producer, recording, engineering, mixing
