= Catharsis (Russian band) =

Russian power metal band

- Origin: Moscow, Russia
- Genres: Power metal
- Years active: 1996–present
- Labels: Irond, Hammer Müzik
- Members: Oleg Zhilyakov; Oleg Misson; Igor Polyakov; Aleksandr Timonin; Julia Red; Anatoliy Levitin
- Website: http://www.catharsis.ru

Catharsis is a Russian power metal band founded in 1996.

In 2013, the band played A389 Bash, an annual music festival organized by Pulling Teeth guitarist Domenic Romeo.

== Lineup ==
Current

- Oleg Zhilyakov – lead vocals (1999–present)
- Oleg Mishin – lead guitar (2002–present)
- Igor Polyakov – rhythm guitar (1996–present)
- Alexander Timonin – bass (2002–present)
- Anatoly Levitin – drums (2008–present)
- Julia Red – keyboards (1996–present)

Former

- Sergey Bendrikov – lead vocals (1996–1998; died 2020)
- Andrey Kapachev – lead vocals (1998–1999)
- Anthony Arikh – lead guitar (1996–2001)
- Alexey Kraev – bass (1996–1998)
- Roman Senkin – bass (1998–2001; died 2017)
- Vladimir Muchnov – drums (1996–2001)
- Andrey Ischenko – drums (2005–2005)
- Alexey Barzilovich – drums (2006–2007)
- Tatiana Korablina – keyboards, vocals (1996–1997)
- Alexandra Abanina – keyboards, vocals (1997–1998)

== Discography ==
=== Studio albums and EPs ===
- Proles Florum (1998)
- Febris Erotica (1999)
- Dea (2001)
- Imago (2002) (with lyrics in English)
- Имаго (Imago) (2003) (with lyrics in Russian)
- Призрачный Свет (Phantom Light) (2004)
- Крылья (Wings) (2005)
- Баллада земли (Ballad of the Earth) (2006)
- Иной (Other) (2010) (internet single)
- Светлый альбом (Light album) (2010)
- Индиго (Indigo) (2014)
- Антология. 20 первых лет. Полное собрание сочинений. (2015) (Deluxe gold box-set 16 CDs + Bonus)
- Время потерь (Time of Loss) (2018)
- Зеркало судьбы (Destiny's Mirror) (2019)
- Книга времён. Будущее прошлого (Book of Times. The Future of the Past) (2022)

=== Singles ===
- Дитя штормов / Child of Storms (Austrian version) (2014) (featuring Sabine Edelsbacher from Edenbridge)
- Дитя штормов / Child of Storms (Spanish version) (2015) (featuring Patricia Tapia from Mägo de Oz)
- Дитя штормов / Child of Storms (Dutch version) (2015) (featuring Dianne van Giersbergen from Ex Libris, Xandria and Countermove)
- Дитя штормов / Child of Storms (Italian version) (2015) (featuring Lisy Stefanoni from Shadygrove)
- Дитя штормов / Child of Storms (Israelian version) (2015) (featuring Infy Snow from Soul Torture)
- Дитя штормов / Child of Storms (Hungarian version) (2015) (featuring Laura Binder from Dalriada)
- Чёрные сфинксы (Black Sphinxes) (2019)

=== Live albums ===
- Верни им небо (Give Them Back the Sky) DVD (2005)
- Верни им небо (Give Them Back the Sky) 2CD (2006)
- 15 лет полета (15 Years of Flight) DVD (2012)

=== Collaborations ===
- Алый король (The Scarlet King) (2020) (with Margenta)

=== Demos ===
- Child of the Flowers (1997)
- Taedium Vitae (1999)
- Prima Scriptio (2003)
