= Fire & Ashes (EP) =

EP by Xandria
- Released: 31 July 2015
- Recorded: 2015
- Studio: Sandlane Recording Facilities, The Netherlands
- Genre: Symphonic metal, power metal
- Length: 35:01
- Label: Napalm NPR 613 DP
- Producer: Joost van den Broek

Xandria chronology
Sacrificium (2014)	Fire & Ashes (2015)	Theater of Dimensions (2017)

Singles from Fire & Ashes
- 1. "Don't Say A Word" Released: 3 July 2015; 2. "Voyage of the Fallen" Released: 30 July 2015

Fire & Ashes is the first EP by German symphonic metal band Xandria. This is the band's second release with vocalist Dianne van Giersbergen. The EP features three new tracks, two rerecorded and remastered tracks, and two cover songs. The EP is produced by Joost van den Broek and contains cover art by Felipe Machado Franco and guest vocals by Valerio Recenti, the Italian singer of the Dutch alternative metal band My Propane. The composition "In Remembrance" is a tribute to classical Italian composer Giuseppe Verdi as it is based on the aria "Morrò, ma prima in grazia" from his opera Un Ballo in Maschera.

== Track listing ==
No.	Title	Length
1.	"Voyage of the Fallen"	4:45
2.	"Unembraced"	4:26
3.	"In Remembrance"	5:00
4.	"I'd Do Anything for Love (But I Won't Do That)" (Meat Loaf cover)	7:25
5.	"Ravenheart" (originally on Ravenheart, 2004)	3:48
6.	"Now & Forever" (originally on India, 2005)	3:23
7.	"Don't Say a Word" (Sonata Arctica cover)	6:07
Total length:		34:54

== Personnel ==
All information from the EP booklet.

Xandria

- Dianne van Giersbergen – vocals
- Marco Heubaum – guitar, vocals, keyboards, producer
- Philip Restemeier – guitar
- Steven Wussow – bass
- Gerit Lamm – drums

Additional musicians

- Valerio Recenti – backing vocals
- Jeroen Goossens – whistles

Production

- Jos Driessen – engineering assistant
- Darius van Helfteren – mastering
- Tim Tronckoe – photography
- Joost van den Broek – recording, mixing, producer
- Felipe Machado Franco – cover art, design
