= Grant Stevens (musician) =

Australian singer-songwriter (born 1953)

- Stevens performing in 1981

Background information
- Born: 27 October 1953 (age 72); Walcha, New South Wales, Australia
- Occupations: Musician; vocal coach
- Formerly of: Nervous Germans; Unheilig
- Website: grantstevens.de

Grant Stevens (born 27 October 1953) is an Australian singer and lyricist who has been based in Germany since the 1970s. From 1981 to 1984, he was the vocalist of the new wave band Nervous Germans. In 1999, he cofounded the rock band Unheilig with Bernd "Der Graf" Heinrich and José Alvarez-Brill. He left the group in 2008.

Stevens has written the German lyrics to two musicals: Die Schöne und das Biest and Robin Hood. He lives in Berlin and works as a vocal coach.

In 2005, Stevens contributed vocals to the Xandria album India.
