= Van Giersbergen =

Van Gierbergen or van Giersbergen is a surname meaning "from Giersbergen". Notable people with the surname include:

- Anneke van Giersbergen (born 1973), Dutch singer, songwriter and guitarist
- Dianne van Giersbergen (born 1985), Dutch heavy metal singer
