= Now =

Now most commonly refers to the present time.

Now, NOW, or The Now may also refer to:

== Organizations ==
- Natal Organisation of Women, a South African women's organization
- National Organization for Women, an American feminist organization
- National Oversight and Whistleblowers (NOW), a Malaysian NGO
- Now! (political party), a liberal political party in Poland
- Ora! (English: Now!), a centrist political party in Italy
- NOW Venture Capital, a Tokyo-based venture capital co-founded by a Kazuma Ieiri
- ServiceNow, a cloud computing company (NYSE ticker symbol NOW)

== Media ==
=== Broadcast and streaming services ===
- Now (streaming service)
- Now Business News Channel, a 24-hour finance news channel
- Now (British TV channel), a British television channel that started broadcasting in 1990 and ceased the same year
- Now TV (Hong Kong), a pay-TV service provider headquartered in Wan Chai North, Victoria City operated by PCCW Media Limited
- Now (Turkish TV channel), a Turkish general entertainment channel owned by The Walt Disney Company, formerly known as TGRT (1993–2007) and Fox (2007–2024)
- NOW.com, an online TV/broadband network, formerly Network of the World owned by PCCW
- NOWTV, the previous on-air name of CHNU-DT in Surrey, British Columbia
- Now TV (New Zealand), a former television station in Christchurch, New Zealand
- 9Now, an Australian video-on-demand service

=== Film, TV episodes, and TV series ===
- No Opportunity Wasted, a Discovery Channel TV series hosted by Phil Keoghan
- "Now" (The Walking Dead), an episode of the television series The Walking Dead
- In Time, formerly titled Now, a 2011 American science fiction film
- Now with Tom Brokaw and Katie Couric, referred to as Now, a 1993–94 news program
- Now on PBS, formerly NOW with Bill Moyers, a TV newsmagazine which aired from 2002 to 2010
- Now with Alex Wagner, an MSNBC news program premiering in 2011
- The Now, combination local news/national news program broadcast on E. W. Scripps Company television affiliates

=== Literature ===
- Now (1940–1947), a political and literary periodical founded by George Woodcock
- NOW! (1979–81 magazine), a short-lived UK news magazine
- Now (newspaper) (1981–), also known as NOW Magazine, a Canadian alternative newsweekly
- Now (1996–2019 magazine), a former British weekly entertainment magazine
- Now (book), 2017, about radical leftist politics by anonymous author(s) The Invisible Committee
- Now (manhwa) (2001–2007), a Korean graphic novel weekly, 2001-7
- The Now (newspaper) (1984–2017), a Canadian biweekly
- NOW Comics, an American comics publisher, active 1985–2005
- NOW News, a Beirut-based Lebanese news website focused on the Middle East published in English and Arabic
- TV Now (2000–), an Irish television magazine

=== Music ===
==== Albums ====
- Now (Anna Abreu album), 2008 album by Finnish singer Anna Abreu
- Now, or Now Fred Astaire, 1959 album by Fred Astaire
- Now (Astrud Gilberto album), 1972 album by Astrud Gilberto
- Now (Bibi Zhou album), 2007 album by Chinese singer Bibi Zhou
- Now (Black Uhuru album), 1990 album by Jamaican reggae band Black Uhuru
- Now! (Bobby Hutcherson album), 1970 album by jazz vibraphonist Bobby Hutcherson
- Now (Cara Jones album), 2000 album by Cara Jones
- Now (Dionne Warwick album), 2012 album by Dionne Warwick
- Now (The Dubliners album), 1975 album by The Dubliners
- Now (Eric Kloss album), 1978 album by saxophonist Eric Kloss
- Now (Fireflight album), 2012 album released by Christian rock band Fireflight
- Now! (France Joli album), 1982 album by France Joli
- Now! (Other Dimensions In Music album), 1997 album by jazz quartet Other Dimensions In Music
- Now (Girugamesh album), 2010 album by Girugämesh
- Now (Graham Nash album), 2023
- Now (Jade Warrior album), 2008 album by British band Jade Warrior
- Now (Jessica Andrews album), 2003 album by country music singer Jessica Andrews
- Now (John Paul Young album), 1996 album by Australian pop singer John Paul Young
- Now (Nearly 36), 2003 album by King Creosote
- Now (Maxwell album), 2001 album by American R&B singer Maxwell
- Now (Mucky Pup album), 1990 album by hardcore band Mucky Pup
- Now (MYMP album), 2008 album by M.Y.M.P.
- Now (The New Seekers album), 1973 album by British pop group The New Seekers
- Now (Patrice Rushen album), 1984 album by American Patrice Rushen
- Now (Peter Frampton album), 2003 album by Peter Frampton
- Now (Paul Rodgers album), 1997 album by English rock musician Paul Rodger
- Now (Se So Neon album), 2025 album by South Korean indie rock band Se So Neon
- Now (Shania Twain album), 2017 album by Canadian Shania Twain
- Now! (Sonny Stitt album), 1963 album by jazz saxophonist Sonny Stitt
- Now (Ten Years After album), 2004 album by blues rock band Ten Years After
- Now (Vigleik Storaas album), 2007 album by Vigleik Storaas Trio
- Now (The Tubes album), 1977 album by The Tubes
- Now, an album by Bhagavan Das
- Now, 1972 album by George Baker
- Now, 2001 album by Greg Long
- Now, 1997 album by Kosmos Express
- Now, 1973 album by Lou Sino
- Now, 1955 album by Steve Roach
- Now (EP), 1992, by Band of Susans
- Now That's What I Call Music!, a series of various artist compilation albums released in the UK and Ireland

==== Songs ====
- "Now" (Def Leppard song), from the album X
- "Now" (Joywave song), from the album How Do You Feel Now?
- "Now" (Paramore song), from the album Paramore
- "Now" (Staind song), from the album Staind
- "Now", by Avail from Front Porch Stories
- "Now", by Brotherhood of Man from Love and Kisses from Brotherhood of Man
- "Now", by Carpenters from Voice of the Heart
- "Now", by Days of the New from Days of the New
- "Now", by Edie Brickell from Shooting Rubberbands at the Stars
- "Now", a single by Eyedea & Abilities
- "Now", a song by Gotthard from Domino Effect
- "Now", by Krokus from Change of Address
- "Now", by Logic from the deluxe album version Under Pressure (album)
- "Now", by Nomeansno from 0 + 2 = 1
- "Now", by Prince from The Gold Experience
- "Now", by Trouble Maker from Chemistry
- "Now", by Yeat from Afterlyfe
- "Now!", by Sandra from The Wheel of Time
- "Now!", by Scorpions from Blackout

==== Performers ====
- The Now, an English punk rock group
- The Now, a name used by American rock band Tripsichord Music Box
- NOW Nightmares on Wax, DJ and electronic music composer

=== Other uses in media ===
- Now (brand), a brand of multimedia electronic devices produced by Hasbro

== Other uses ==
- Google Now, a mobile personalized search application by Google
- Negotiable order of withdrawal account, a type of bank account
- Network of Workstations, a computer network
- Northern Ohio and Western Railway, an Ohio railroad

== See also ==
- The Now Show, a British radio comedy show
- Now, Now, a U.S. rock band
- Now and Forever (disambiguation)
