= Now and Forever =

Now and Forever or Now & Forever may refer to:

== Film and television ==
- Now and Forever (1934 film), an American drama by Henry Hathaway
- Now and Forever, a 1953 Finnish film shot in the Philippines
- Now and Forever (1956 film), a British drama by Mario Zampi
- Now and Forever (1983 film), an Australian adaptation of the Danielle Steel novel (see below), by Adrian Carr
- Now & Forever (2002 film), an American romance by Bob Clark
- Now and Forever (2006 film), a South Korean film by Kim Seong-joong
- Now and Forever (TV series), a 2005–2006 Philippine daytime drama

== Literature ==
- Now and Forever (novel), a 1978 novel by Danielle Steel
- Now and Forever, a 1979 novel by Diana Palmer
- Now and Forever: Somewhere a Band Is Playing & Leviathan '99, a 2007 collection of stories by Ray Bradbury

== Music ==
=== Albums ===
- Now and Forever (Air Supply album) or the title song, 1982
  - Now and Forever...Greatest Hits Live, by Air Supply, 1995
- Now and Forever (Donna Cruz album), 2016
- Now & Forever (Kim Wilde album) or the title song, 1995
- Now and Forever (Sister Sin album), 2012
- Now and Forever: The Hits, by TLC, and Now and Forever: The Video Hits, a video compilation, 2003
- Now & Forever – Best of Xandria or the 2005 title song (see below), 2008
- Now + 4eva, by Architecture in Helsinki, 2014
- Now & Forever, by Anne Murray or the 1986 title song (see below), 1994
- Now & Forever, by Color Me Badd, 1996
- Now and Forever, by the Lettermen, 1974
- Now and Forever, by Sattalites, 1995
- Now and Forever, by Triinu Kivilaan, 2008
- Now And Forever: The Ballads or the 1994 title song (see below), by Richard Marx, 2014

=== Songs ===
- "Now and Forever" (Carole King song), 1992
- "Now and Forever" (Richard Marx song), 1994
- "Now and Forever (You and Me)", by Anne Murray, 1986
- "Now and Forever", by Barry Manilow and Sheena Easton from the film The Pebble and the Penguin, 1995
- "Now & Forever", by Drake from If You're Reading This It's Too Late, 2015
- "Now and Forever", by Hinoi Team, 2006
- "Now and Forever", by Vanilla Ice from Mind Blowin', 1994
- "Now & Forever", by Xandria from India, 2005

== See also ==
- Ahora y Siempre (disambiguation)
