= Nervous Germans =

German new wave band

- Nervous Germans c. 1981 in Aachen, Germany

Background information
- Genres: New wave
- Years active: 1980–1984, 2012–present

Nervous Germans was a German new wave rock band formed in 1980.

== History ==
In 1981, they released their debut album Nervösen Deutschen (English release: Desolation Zone, 1982). Their second Album Summer of Love (1983) was also their last, as they disbanded on 1 July 1984 in the aftermath of a concert in Linnich (with Mitch Ryder). The Name was suggested to Micki Meuser by Alex Londner (Aachen, Germany), possibly in view of Germany being a nuclear battlefield after the NATO Double-Track Decision.

They recorded a session with John Peel in October 1980 produced by Bob Sargeant (The Beat).

- Micki Meuser (bass, vocals)
- Manni Holländer (real name Manfred Herten; guitar, vocals)
- Edgar Liebert (a.k.a. Edgar de Gaulle; drums, vocals)
- Grant Stevens (lead vocals)
- Wolfgang Gunnewig (guitar)

Udo Dahmen (Kraan) played drums on the debut album. Other former members include Steve Carroll (guitarist of Praying Mantis) Robbie Vondenhoff (Zeltinger Band, Ina Deter), Mike Rossi (Slaughter & the Dogs), Alan Darby (Cockney Rebel, Eric Clapton), Frank Jermann and Hitta Thomas.

Meuser and Stevens reformed Nervous Germans in 2012 with Gary Schmalzl on guitar & Sabine Ahlbrecht on drums. They subsequently toured twice with Billy Idol opening the shows in Germany. This experience helped spawn the single "Punk Rock Radio" which received substantial college radio airplay in the United States.

== Discography ==
- 1981: Nervösen Deutschen (album, Up Records)
- 1982: Desolation Zone (album, Rondelet Music & Records)
- 1983: Summer of Love (album, Vertigo)
- 2013: Preloved (EP)
- 2014: Volatile (album)
- 2015: From Prussia with Love (album)
- 2017: The Creeps are back in Town (EP)

Singles

- 1982: "These Boots Are Made for Walking"
- 1983: "Summer of Love"
- 2012: "¡Yeah Yeah!"
