= The Wonders Still Awaiting =

Studio album by Xandria
- Released: 3 February 2023
- Genre: Symphonic metal
- Length: 74:20
- Label: Napalm
- Producer: Marco Heubaum

Xandria chronology
Theater of Dimensions (2017)	The Wonders Still Awaiting (2023)	Universal Tales (2024)

Singles from The Wonders Still Awaiting
- 1. "Reborn" Released: 24 May 2022; 2. "You Will Never Be Our God" Released: 7 September 2022; 3. "Ghosts" Released: 3 November 2022; 4. "The Wonders Still Awaiting" Released: 6 December 2022; 5. "Two Worlds" Released: 31 January 2023; 6. "My Curse Is My Redemption" Released: 26 April 2023

Professional ratings
Review scores
Source	Rating
Blabbermouth	7.5/10

The Wonders Still Awaiting is the eighth studio album by German symphonic metal band Xandria. The album was released on 3 February 2023 via Napalm Records.

It is the band's first studio album to feature lead vocalist Ambre Vourvahis, Tim Schwarz on bass, drummer Dimitros Gatsios and guitarist Rob Klawonn, as well as the first album to not feature drummer Gerit Lamm and guitarist Philip Restemeier.

== Track listing ==
All music is composed by Marco Heubaum.

The Wonders Still Awaiting tracklisting
No.	Title	Lyrics	Length
1.	"Two Worlds"	Marco Heubaum	7:08
2.	"Reborn"	Heubaum	5:13
3.	"You Will Never Be Our God"	Heubaum	5:11
4.	"The Wonders Still Awaiting"	Heubaum	4:59
5.	"Ghosts"	Ambre Vourvahis	5:26
6.	"Your Stories I'll Remember"	Heubaum	6:21
7.	"My Curse Is My Redemption"	Heubaum	5:03
8.	"Illusion Is Their Name"	Heubaum	5:07
9.	"Paradise"	Vourvahis	5:02
10.	"Mirror of Time"	Vourvahis	6:41
11.	"Scars"	Vourvahis	4:07
12.	"The Maiden and the Child"	Heubaum	4:54
13.	"Astèria"	Vourvahis	9:08
Total length:			74:20

=== Notes ===
- The mediabook edition features a second disc, containing the orchestral versions of the first disc.

== Personnel ==
All information from the album booklet.

Xandria

- Marco Heubaum – rhythm guitar, keyboards, programming, backing vocals
- Ambre Vourvahis – lead vocals
- Rob Klawonn – lead guitar
- Tim Schwarz – bass
- Dimitrios Gatsios – drums

Additional musicians

- Ralf Scheepers – guest vocals on "You Will Never Be Our God"
- Ally Storch – violin, cello
- McAlbi – low whistle
- Johannes Schiefner – uilleann pipes
- Sofia Session Orchestra & Choir - choir
- Bulgarian National Radio Children´s Choir - children choir

Production

- Marco Heubaum – producer, recordings
- Jacob Hansen – mixing, mastering
- Luki Knoebi – orchestral arrangements
- Christoph Wieczorek – vocal recordings
- Julian Breucker – vocal recordings
- Zacarias Guterres – cover artwork
- Novans V. Adikresna - booklet artwork and layout

== Charts ==
Chart performance for The Wonders Still Awaiting
Chart (2023)	Peak position
Belgian Albums (Ultratop Wallonia)	171
German Albums (Offizielle Top 100)	9
Scottish Albums (Official Charts)	92
Swiss Albums (Schweizer Hitparade)	11
UK Album Downloads (Official Charts)	53
UK Rock & Metal Albums (Official Charts)	4
