= Universal Tales =

2024 EP by Xandria

EP by Xandria
- Released: 22 November 2024
- Studios: Neverworld Studio; Patchway Studio
- Genre: Symphonic metal
- Length: 41:49
- Label: Napalm
- Producer: Marco Heubaum

Xandria chronology
The Wonders Still Awaiting (2023)	Universal Tales (2024)	Eclipse (2026)

Singles from Universal Tales
- 1. "Universal" Released: 16 April 2024; 2. "No Time to Live Forever" Released: 2 October 2024; 3. "200 Years" Released: 21 November 2024

Universal Tales is the second EP by German symphonic metal band Xandria. It was released on 22 November 2024 via Napalm. It is the final release to feature Tim Schwarz on bass.

== Track listing ==
All tracks are written by Marco Heubaum.

Universal Tales track listing
No.	Title	Length
1.	"No Time to Live Forever"	4:38
2.	"Universal"	4:41
3.	"200 Years" (featuring Ally Storch)	4:42
4.	"Live the Tale"	4:52
5.	"The Wonders Still Awaiting" (acoustic film score version)	4:08
6.	"No Time to Live Forever" (orchestral version)	4:37
7.	"Universal" (orchestral version)	4:41
8.	"200 Years" (orchestral version; featuring Ally Storch)	4:39
9.	"Live the Tale" (orchestral version)	4:52
Total length:		41:49

== Personnel ==
Xandria

- Marco Heubaum – rhythm guitar, keyboards, programming, backing vocals
- Ambre Vourvahis – lead vocals
- Rob Klawonn – lead guitar
- Tim Schwarz – bass
- Dimitrios Gatsios – drums

Additional musicians

- Ally Storch – violin (tracks 3, 8)
- McAlbi – tin and low whistles (tracks 3, 8)
- Sofia Session Orchestra & Choir – choir

Production

- Marco Heubaum – producer, engineering
- Sascha Paeth – engineering
- Jacob Hansen – mixing, mastering
- Lukas Geppert – orchestral arrangements, sound design
- Fab Mariana – cover art
