= Manuela Kraller =

German singer (born 1981)

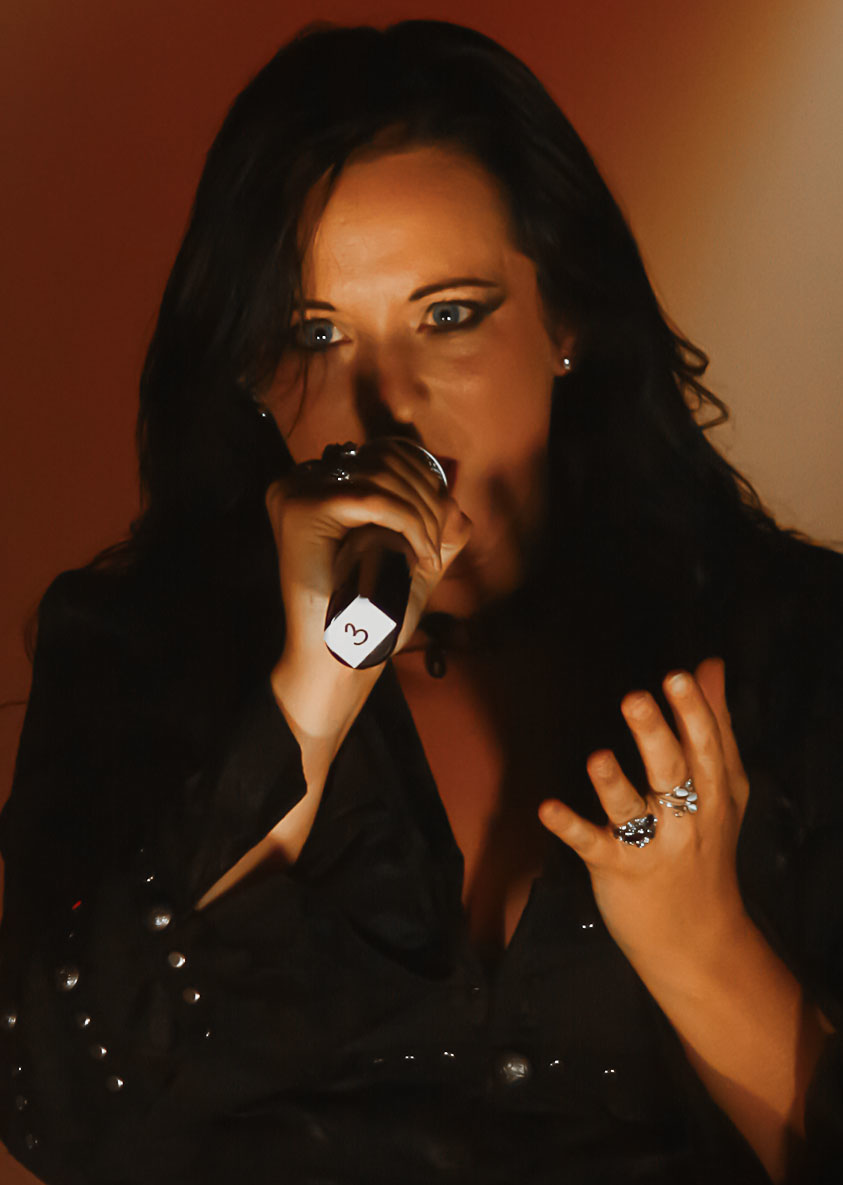
- Kraller with Xandria at a live performance in 2011

Background information
- Born: 1 August 1981 (age 45); Ainring, West Germany
- Origin: Bayerisch Gmain, Germany
- Genres: Classical; Medieval music; symphonic metal; gothic metal
- Occupation: Singer
- Years active: 2005–present
- Label: Napalm

Manuela Kraller (born 1 August 1981) is a German spinto soprano singer. She is best known as the former lead singer of symphonic metal band Xandria from late 2010 until late 2013. She was formerly one of the soprano vocalists in the symphonic metal band Haggard. She now has a project called Valkea Valo with her friend Tobias Gut, which strays from the metal scene and to more of a classical style.

== Musical career ==
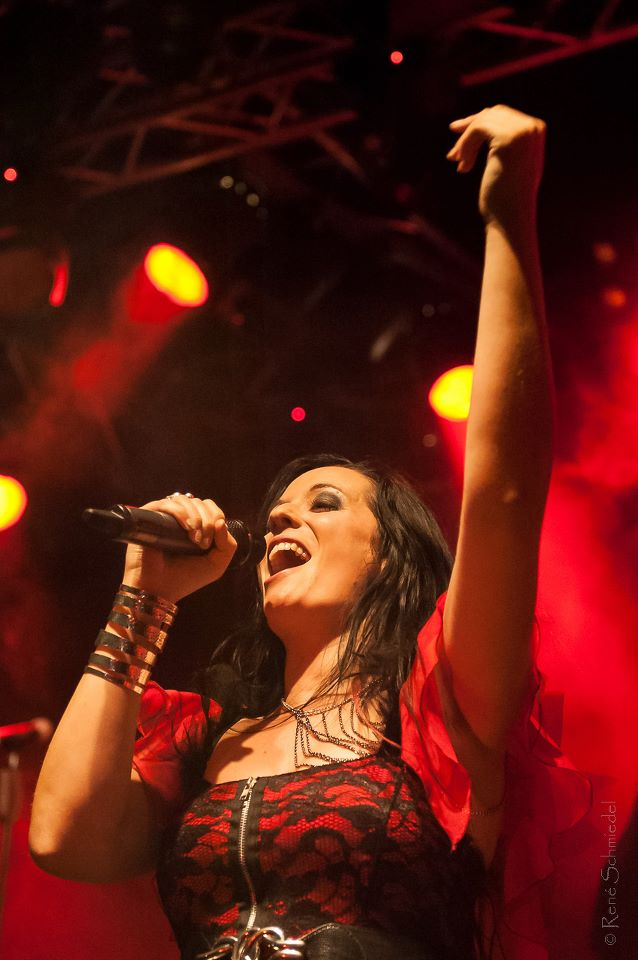
Kraller in 2012

Manuela began her musical life in 2005 at the age of 23 while singing in a Finnish choir group, and discovered her new passion was singing. She took classical singing lessons and sang in more church and gospel choirs, and was soon asked to become a solo singer. She grew up with rock and metal music, and wanted to combine it with her classical background, and so began singing rock and metal music songs. She unsuccessfully auditioned to be the new lead singer of Nightwish in 2006.

While writing her own songs, she joined the Swiss band Nagor Mar, but shortly, she left and became a vocalist for German musical group Haggard. She only performed with Haggard live. On 19 December 2010, she became the new singer of Xandria after Lisa Middelhauve finished performing the rest of the live tour dates after Kerstin's departure. On 7 January 2011, she debuted live with Xandria at the "Classic Meets Pop" event at the Seidensticker Halle in Bielefeld, and performed their 2004 hit song, "Ravenheart", with the Bielefeld Philharmonic Orchestra. She then toured with Xandria on the Out of The Dark tour. On 28 November 2011, Xandria announced they would release their first album with Kraller, Neverworld's End, and released the album's only single, "Valentine", on 14 February 2012, followed by their music video with Manuela. She then went on tour with Epica, Stream of Passion and Kamelot on their Neverworld's End tour.

In August 2013, Manuela collaborated with Heidi Parviainen, the former lead singer of Amberian Dawn, on a duet on her new project Dark Sarah for her upcoming album.

On 25 October 2013, the band announced on their website that Manuela Kraller had left the band to pursue a different career and was succeeded by Dutch singer and Ex Libris frontwoman Dianne van Giersbergen (who is also no longer the frontwoman of Xandria). Manuela leaves the band with regret but also full of gratitude, thanking Xandria and fans for the time together and being grateful for the "wonderful moments in mutual tours and shows".

On 6 April Heidi Parviainen confirmed on Dark Sarah's Facebook page that Manuela Kraller is about to guest again on Dark Sarah's second album, The Puzzle.

== Influences ==
She was inspired by symphonic metal bands. She claims Amy Lee, Tarja Turunen and Anneke van Giersbergen were early influences on her singing style. She said Nightwish, Kamelot and Within Temptation are her personal favorites.

== Discography ==
=== Nagor Mar ===
Songs released (2009):

- "Bleeding Rose"
- "Passion"
- "Deliverance"
- "Bleeding Rose (Part II)"

=== Xandria ===
Studio albums:

- Neverworld's End (2012)

Singles:

- "Valentine" (2012)

=== Solo work ===
- O Holy Night (2013)

=== Valkea Valo ===
- TBA

=== Alanae / Anaya / Munay Anaya (solo project) ===
Singles:

- "Return to elements" (2020)

=== Guest vocal appearances ===
- Guest vocals on At the Edge by Voices of Destiny and part of the choir on the album Crisis Cult (2014)
- Memories Fall by Dark Sarah from the album Behind the Black Veil (2015)
- Rain by Dark Sarah from the album The Puzzle (2016)
