= Ainring =

- Municipality
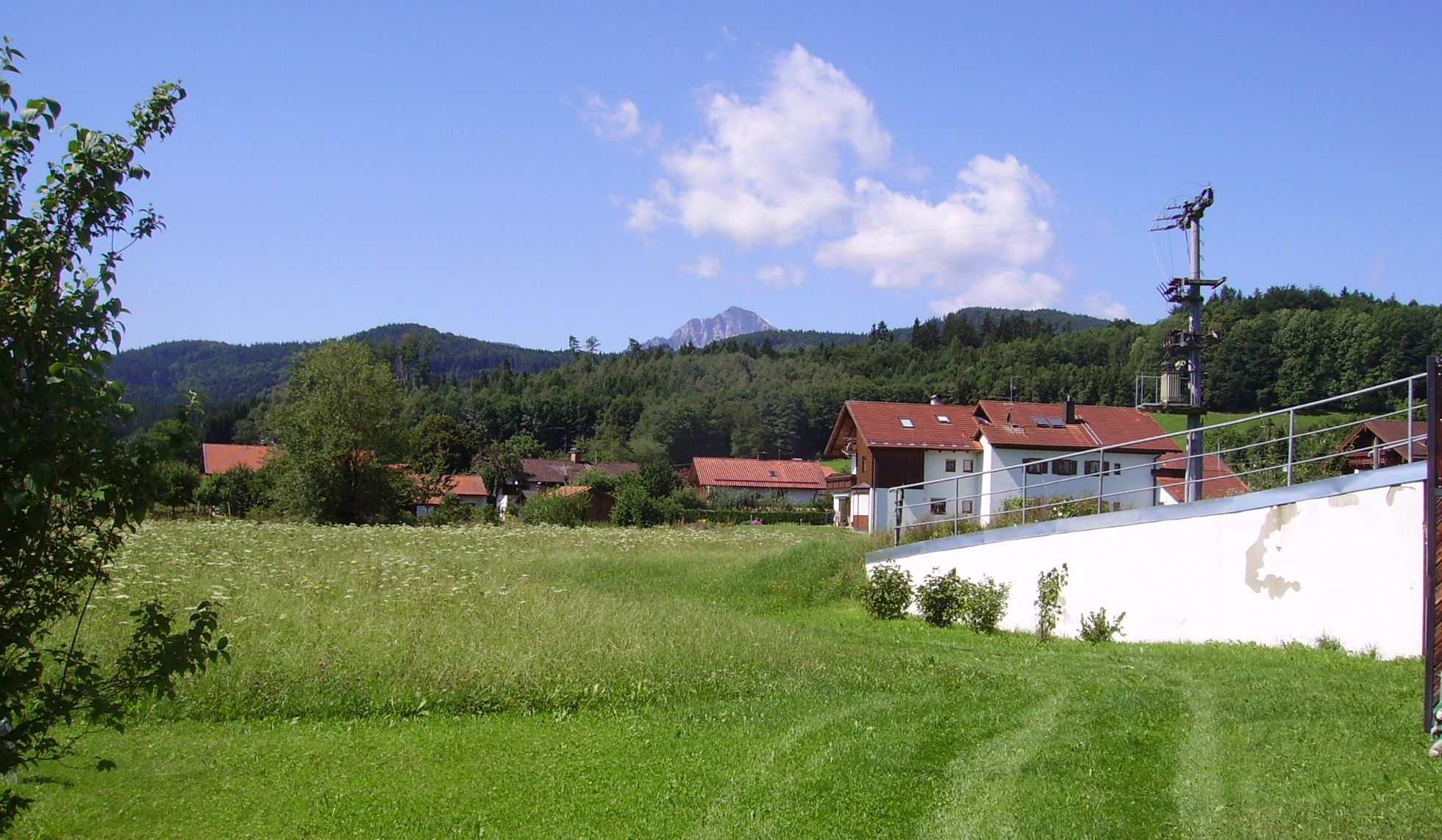
- Ainring

- Coat of arms

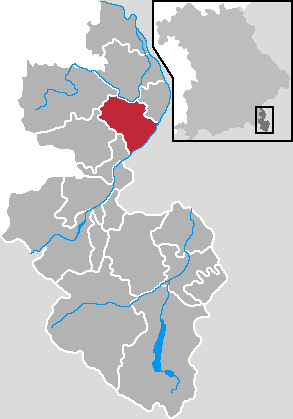
- Location of Ainring within Berchtesgadener Land district
- Interactive map of Ainring
- Location within Germany Location within Bavaria
- Coordinates: 47°48′49″N 12°56′34″E
- Country: Germany
- State: Bavaria
- Admin. region: Oberbayern
- District: Berchtesgadener Land

Government
  - Mayor (2020–26): Martin Öttl

Area
  - Total: 32.97 km^{2} (12.73 sq mi)
- Elevation: 459 m (1,506 ft)

Population (2025-12-31)
  - Total: 9,725
  - Density: 295.0/km^{2} (764.0/sq mi)
- Time zone: UTC+01:00 (CET)
  - Summer (DST): UTC+02:00 (CEST)
- Postal codes: 83404
- Dialling codes: 08654 & 08656
- Vehicle registration: BGL
- Website: www.ainring.de

Ainring is a municipality in the district of Berchtesgadener Land, Upper Bavaria, Germany, near the border to Austria.

After World War II it was the site of a displaced persons camp.

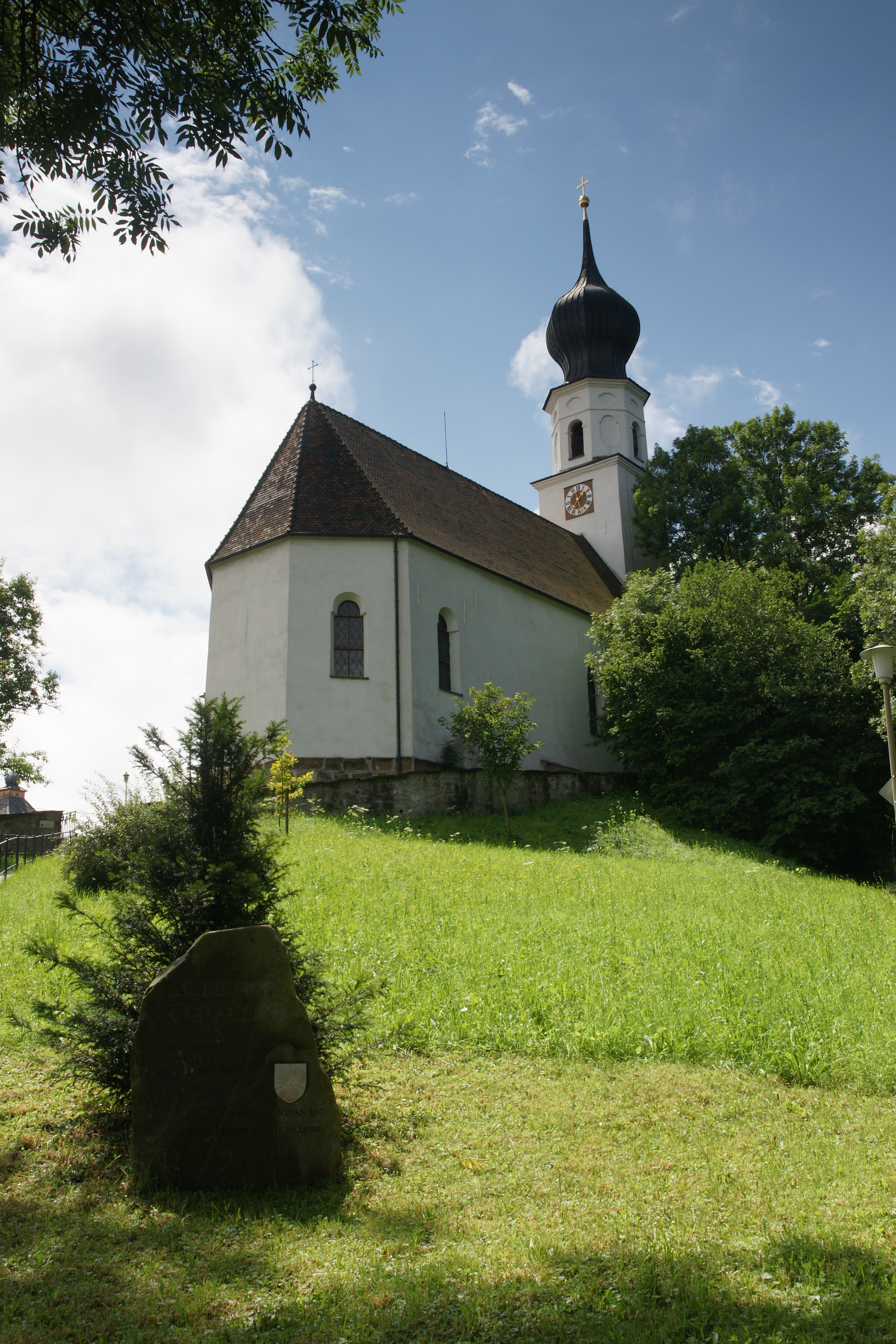

== Personalities ==
=== Sons and daughters Ainrings ===
- Manuela Kraller (born 1981), singer

=== Connected to Ainring ===
- Eugen Sänger (1905-1964), engineer and pioneer in the field of aerospace
- Hans Söllner (born 1955), Bavarian singer-songwriter; lives in Ainring
