= Kill the Sun =

Studio album by Xandria
- Released: 5 May 2003
- Recorded: 2002–2003
- Studio: Principal Studios (Münster); DRP Studio (Bochum)
- Genre: Gothic metal
- Length: 39:57
- Label: Drakkar Entertainment
- Producer: Dirk Riegner

Xandria chronology
| Kill The Sun (demo) (2001) | Kill the Sun (2003) | Ravenheart (2004) |

Singles from Kill the Sun
- 1. "Kill the Sun" Released: 2003

Professional ratings
Review scores
| Source | Rating |
|---|---|
| Release Magazine | 7/10 |

Kill the Sun is the debut studio album by German symphonic metal band Xandria, released on 5 May 2003 through Drakkar Entertainment label. The record includes one single, "Kill the Sun".

== Background ==
This is the band's debut album. All songs which were to be found on the demo already plus another five which had been written in the meantime were recorded for it with producer Dirk Riegner, also known as the keyboard player of Secret Discovery and recently as the producer of Milú. After a short period of pre-production at Dirk Riegner's studio, which then was located right beside the grounds of the Zeche Bochum, the band entered Principal Studio in Münster in 2003. Within one week, the instrumental parts were recorded, and for the vocal recordings the band again went to Bochum to the small studio of the producer. Afterwards, the album was mixed on the grounds of the Horus Sound Studios (also Guano Apes etc.) in Hannover at a small studio of mixing engineer Modo Bierkamp. Three months later, the result—provided with an artwork by Kai Hoffmann (also Secret Discovery)— hit the stores on 5 May 2003 and at once met with as much approval as to enter the German charts: On number 98 it only just hit them, but this was quite remarkable for a German band whose sound mainly was and still is influenced by gothic metal.

== Track listing ==
All tracks are written by Marco Heubaum, except where noted.

| No. | Title | Length |
|---|---|---|
| 1. | "Kill the Sun" | 3:23 |
| 2. | "Mermaids" | 3:44 |
| 3. | "Ginger" (lyrics: Lisa Schaphaus, music: Heubaum, Schaphaus) | 4:56 |
| 4. | "She's Nirvana" | 3:22 |
| 5. | "Forever Yours" (Schaphaus) | 5:08 |
| 6. | "Casablanca" | 4:05 |
| 7. | "So You Disappear" | 4:42 |
| 8. | "Wisdom" | 3:10 |
| 9. | "Isis/Osiris" (Heubaum, Schaphaus) | 3:50 |
| 10. | "Calyx Virago" | 3:37 |
| Total length: | | 39:57 |

== Personnel ==
All information from the album booklet.

Xandria

- Lisa Schaphaus – vocals
- Marco Heubaum – guitars, keyboards, programming
- Philip Restemeier – guitars
- Roland Krueger – bass
- Gerit Lamm – drums

Additional musicians

- Deutung – cello on "She's Nirvana"
- Marco Minnemann – percussion on "She's Nirvana"
- Andreas Litschel – intro on "Isis/Osiris"

Production

- Kai Hoffmann – artwork, intro on "So You Disappear"
- Britta Kühlmann – engineering
- Modo Bierkamp – mixing, mastering
- Dirk Riegner – producer, keyboards, programming
- Dirk Schelpmeier – photography
