= Dea (album) =

Studio album by Catharsis
- Released: 2001
- Recorded: December 2000
- Genre: Power metal
- Length: 36:17
- Label: Irond

Catharsis chronology
Febris Erotica (1999)	Dea (2001)	Imago (2002)

Dea is the first full-length album by Russian power metal band Catharsis. It was released in 2001 by Irond. The album was the most commercially successful Russian metal release of 2001. It was released internationally in 2002 by Hammer Müzik. In 2004, Irond re-released the album together with the Febris Erotica EP.

In Western Europe, the album received a 7.5 out of 10 score from Rock Hard, a 6 out of 10 score from Metal.de, and further reviews from Powermetal.de, Ox-Fanzine and Metal Inside.

== Track listing ==
1. "Igni et Ferro" – 6:55
2. "A Trip into Elysium" – 5:00
3. "My Love, the Phiery" – 7:55
4. "Etude №1 A-Moll for Piano, op. 1" – 2:48
5. "Pro Memoria" – 5:27
6. "Silent Tears" – 5:13
7. "...Into Oblivion" – 2:59

== Personnel ==
- Oleg Zhilyakov – vocals
- Igor Polyakov – rhythm guitar, acoustic guitar
- Julia Red – keyboards
- Anthony Arikh – lead guitar, acoustic guitar
- Vladimir Muchnov – drums
- Vadim Bystrov – bass
