= Medea (Ex Libris album) =

Studio album by Ex Libris
- Released: 18 January 2014
- Genre: Symphonic metal, progressive metal
- Length: 61:13
- Label: Self-released

Ex Libris chronology
Amygdala (2008)	Medea (2014)

Medea is the second studio album of the Dutch symphonic/progressive metal band Ex Libris, released in 2014. It is a concept album about the Greek tragedy of Medea and her lover Jason.

== Track listing ==
No.	Title	Note(s)	Length
1.	"Medea"		6:50
2.	"Murderess in Me"		7:38
3.	"On the Ocean's Command"		8:00
4.	"My Dream I Dream"		6:19
5.	"Song of Discord"	Guest vocals by Damian Wilson	5:54
6.	"A Mother's Lament"		5:37
7.	"Daughter of Corinth"		7:52
8.	"A Tale Told..." (Instrumental)		2:12
9.	"From Rebirth to Bloodshed"		10:51
Total length:			61:13

== Personnel ==
Band members

- Paul van den Broek - guitars (lead)
- Koen Stam - keyboards
- Dianne van Giersbergen - vocals
- Peter den Bakker - bass guitar
- Eelco van der Meer - drums

Guest/session members

- Damian Wilson - vocals (on track 5)
