= Salomé – The Seventh Veil =

Studio album by Xandria
- Released: 25 May 2007
- Recorded: 2006–2007
- Studio: Principal Studios
- Genre: Symphonic metal, power metal
- Length: 48:49
- Label: Drakkar Entertainment
- Producer: Marco Heubaum

Xandria chronology
India (2005)	Salomé – The Seventh Veil (2007)	Now & Forever – Best of Xandria (2008)

Singles from Salomé – The Seventh Veil
- 1. "Save My Life" Released: 2007; 2. "Sisters of the Light" Released: December 2007

Salomé – The Seventh Veil is the fourth studio album by German symphonic metal band Xandria, released on 25 May 2007 through Drakkar Entertainment label. The album is a concept album and is loosely based on Salomé, a Biblical character. The songs have oriental leanings supported by an extensive orchestra. This album is the last one to feature Lisa Middelhauve on vocals.

Two singles were released from the record: "Save My Life" and "Sisters of the Light". The album peaked at No.49 in German charts.

== Track listing ==
No.	Title	Lyrics	Music	Length
1.	"Save My Life"	Marco Heubaum, Lisa Middelhauve	Heubaum	3:56
2.	"Vampire"	L. Middelhauve, Nils Middelhauve	Heubaum	4:31
3.	"Beware"	L. Middelhauve	Heubaum, L. Middelhauve	3:21
4.	"Emotional Man"	N. Middelhauve	N. Middelhauve	4:03
5.	"Salomé"	L. Middelhauve	Heubaum	6:11
6.	"Only for the Stars in Your Eyes"	L. Middelhauve	Heubaum, L. Middelhauve	3:17
7.	"Firestorm"	L. Middelhauve	Heubaum	4:50
8.	"A New Age"	N. Middelhauve	N. Middelhauve	3:37
9.	"The Wind and the Ocean"	L. Middelhauve	L. Middelhauve	3:24
10.	"Sisters of the Light"	L. Middelhauve	Heubaum, L. Middelhauve	3:37
11.	"Sleeping Dogs Lie"	N. Middelhauve	Heubaum, N. Middelhauve	4:11
12.	"On My Way"	N. Middelhauve	N. Middelhauve	3:51
Total length:				48:49

Bonus track
No.	Title	Lyrics	Music	Length
13.	"Sisters of the Light" (Xandria on Extasy version, remixed by Chai Deveraux of Jesus on Extasy)	L. Middelhauve	Heubaum, L. Middelhauve	5:07
Total length:				53:56

== Personnel ==
All information from the album booklet.

Xandria

- Lisa Middelhauve – vocals, keyboards, grunts on "Firestorm"
- Marco Heubaum – guitar, keyboards, producer
- Philip Restemeier – guitar
- Nils Middelhauve – bass, guitars
- Gerit Lamm – drums

Additional personnel

- Henning Verlage – keyboards on "The Wind and the Ocean"
- Mika Tauriainen – vocals on "Emotional Man" and "Only for the Stars in Your Eyes"

Production

- Britta Sumkötter – artwork design
- Marcus Langer – artwork design
- Jörg Umbreit – engineering
- Von Uslar – photography
