= Now & Forever – Best of Xandria =

Compilation album by Xandria
- Released: 6 June 2008
- Recorded: 2006–2007
- Genre: Symphonic metal
- Length: 78:31
- Label: Drakkar Entertainment 138
- Producer: Marco Heubaum

Xandria chronology
Salomé – The Seventh Veil (2007)	Now & Forever – Best of Xandria (2008)	Neverworld's End (2012)

Now & Forever – Best of Xandria is a compilation album by German symphonic metal band Xandria, released on 6 June 2008 via Drakkar Entertainment label. The record was published as a package including a DVD containing live performances, music videos, and interviews.

== Track listing ==
No.	Title	Lyrics	Music	Length
1.	"Now & Forever"	Heubaum	Heubaum	3:20
2.	"Ravenheart"	L. Middelhauve	Heubaum, L. Middelhauve	3:44
3.	"Kill the Sun"	Heubaum	Heubaum	3:23
4.	"In Love with the Darkness"	L. Middelhauve, N. Middelhauve	L. Middelhauve, Heubaum, N. Middelhauve	3:49
5.	"Eversleeping"	L. Middelhauve	L. Middelhauve	3:40
6.	"Only for the Stars in Your Eyes"	L. Middelhauve	Heubaum, L. Middelhauve	3:17
7.	"The End of Every Story"	Heubaum	Heubaum, Restemeier	4:54
8.	"The Lioness"	L. Middelhauve	Heubaum, L. Middelhauve	4:49
9.	"India"	Heubaum	Heubaum	5:17
10.	"Save My Life"	Heubaum, L. Middelhauve	Heubaum	3:56
11.	"Ginger"	L. Middelhauve	Heubaum, L. Middelhauve	4:56
12.	"Firestorm"	L. Middelhauve	Heubaum	4:50
13.	"Some Like It Cold"	L. Middelhauve	Heubaum, L. Middelhauve	3:56
14.	"Black Flame"	Heubaum	Heubaum	3:29
15.	"Like a Rose on the Grave of Love" (with vocals from Jessica Thierjung (Lyriel))	L. Middelhauve	L. Middelhauve	4:25
16.	"Sisters of the Light"	L. Middelhauve	Heubaum, L. Middelhauve	3:37
17.	"Mermaids (Child of the Blue)"	Heubaum	Heubaum	3:44
18.	"Drown in Me"	Heubaum	Heubaum	3:13
19.	"One Word"	Heubaum	Heubaum	3:36
20.	"Lullaby"	N. Middelhauve	N. Middelhauve	2:43

== Personnel ==
All information from the album booklet.

Xandria

- Lisa Middelhauve – vocals
- Marco Heubaum – guitar, keyboards
- Philip Restemeier – guitar
- Roland Krueger – bass on tracks 3, 11, 13, 14, 17
- Daniel Joeriskes – bass on tracks 2, 5, 8, 18, 19
- Nils Middelhauve – bass on tracks 1, 4, 6, 7, 9, 10, 12, 15, 16, 20
- Gerit Lamm – drums

Production

- Vincent Sorg – remastering
- Ronald Matthes – director, executive producer (DVD)
- Kleif Baltes – editing assistant (DVD)
- Marcus Dattilo – editing assistant (DVD)
- Thomas Grummt – DVD authoring
- Jacky Lehmann – audio mixing (DVD)
- Jan-Paul Wass – video mixing, editing (DVD)
- Marius Kopec – executive producer (DVD)
- Kaja Kargus – editing (DVD)
- Wiebke Gürth – editing (DVD)
