= Eclipse (Xandria album) =

Studio album by Xandria
- Released: 7 August 2026
- Genre: Symphonic metal
- Length: 57:36
- Label: Napalm
- Producer: Marco Heubaum

Xandria chronology
Universal Tales (2024)	Eclipse (2026)

Singles from Eclipse
- 1. "The Shannon's Home" Released: 7 May 2026; 2. "Colours" Released: 2 June 2026; 3. "Northstar" Released: 8 July 2026; 4. "Eclipse" Released: 5 August 2026

Professional ratings
Review scores
Source	Rating
Blabbermouth.net	7.5/10
Dead Rhetoric	8/10
Distorted Sound	8/10

Eclipse is the ninth studio album by German symphonic metal band Xandria. The album was released on 7 August 2026 via Napalm Records. Singles were released for some tracks such as "The Shannon's Home", "Colours", and the title track.

== Track listing ==
All tracks are written by Marco Heubaum.

Eclipse track listing
No.	Title	Length
1.	"Syzygy"	1:23
2.	"Eclipse"	5:16
3.	"Colours"	5:03
4.	"The Shannon's Home"	5:31
5.	"The Grand Delusion"	4:47
6.	"Wave of Tanis"	4:58
7.	"Northstar"	6:00
8.	"Masquerade"	5:30
9.	"The Last Generation"	5:35
10.	"The Poetry of the Real World"	4:56
11.	"Lore"	8:37
Total length:		57:36

== Personnel ==
- Ambre Vourvahis – lead vocals
- Rob Klawonn – lead guitar
- Marco Heubaum – rhythm guitar, bass guitar, keyboards
- Dimitrios Gatsios – drums

== Charts ==
Chart performance for Eclipse
Chart (2026)	Peak position
Austrian Albums (Ö3 Austria)	35
French Physical Albums (SNEP)	140
French Rock & Metal Albums (SNEP)	33
German Albums (Offizielle Top 100)	11
German Rock & Metal Albums (Offizielle Top 100)	3
Swiss Albums (Schweizer Hitparade)	11
UK Albums Sales (Official Charts)	86
UK Independent Albums (Official Charts)	24
UK Rock & Metal Albums (Official Charts)	16
