= Neverworld's End =

Studio album by Xandria
- Released: 24 February 2012
- Studio: Principal Studios (Münster); Weltram Studios (Munich)
- Genre: Symphonic metal, power metal
- Length: 63:42
- Label: Napalm
- Producer: Marco Heubaum

Xandria chronology
Now & Forever – Best of Xandria (2008)	Neverworld's End (2012)	Sacrificium (2014)

Singles from Neverworld's End
- 1. "Valentine" Released: 11 February 2012

Professional ratings
Review scores
Source	Rating
Examiner.com	8.3/10 stars
Metal Storm	8.3/10 stars
Metal Underground	4.5/5 stars

Neverworld's End is the fifth studio album by German symphonic metal band Xandria. The record was released by Napalm Records on 24 February 2012. It is the only album to feature Manuela Kraller on vocals, and the last album to feature Nils Middelhauve on bass. The album produced one single, "Valentine".

== Track listing ==
All tracks are written by Marco Heubaum, except where noted.

No.	Title	Lyrics	Music	Length
1.	"A Prophecy of Worlds to Fall"			7:23
2.	"Valentine"			4:11
3.	"Forevermore"			4:59
4.	"Euphoria"			4:30
5.	"Blood on My Hands"			4:17
6.	"Soulcrusher"			6:11
7.	"The Dream Is Still Alive"			4:23
8.	"The Lost Elysion"			5:26
9.	"Call of the Wind"	Marco Heubaum & Manuela Kraller		4:52
10.	"A Thousand Letters"	Manuela Kraller		4:18
11.	"Cursed"	Nils Middelhauve	Philip Restemeier & Marco Heubaum	4:10
12.	"The Nomad's Crown"			9:02
Total length:				63:42

Japanese and Vinyl bonus track
No.	Title	Lyrics	Music	Length
13.	"When the Mirror Cracks"	Nils Middelhauve	Marco Heubaum	4:08
Total length:				67:50

Vinyl bonus track
No.	Title	Length
14.	"The Sailor and the Sea"	3:10
Total length:		71:00

== Charts ==
Chart (2012)	Peak position
German Albums Chart	43
Swiss Albums Chart	51

== Personnel ==
All information from the album booklet.

Xandria

- Manuela Kraller – vocals
- Marco Heubaum – rhythm guitar, keyboards
- Philip Restemeier – lead guitar
- Nils Middelhauve – bass
- Gerit Lamm – drums

Additional musicians

- Joost van den Broek – keyboards, programming, orchestrations, sound design
- Ben Mathot – violin
- McAlbi – tin whistle, low whistle
- Johannes Schiefner – uilleann pipes

Choir

- Fredrik Forsblad, Norbert Swoboda, Anselm Soos, Mani Müller, Klaus Ackermann, Mani Gruber, Marc Zillmann

Production

- Marco Heubaum – production
- Corni Bartels – engineering, vocal co-production
- Jörg Umbreit – mixing, mastering, engineering
- Stefan Heilemann – artwork, photography, layout, cover art
