= Febris Erotica =

EP by Catharsis
- Released: 1999
- Recorded: June – August 1999
- Genre: Power metal
- Length: 22:02
- Label: Isolated Records

Catharsis chronology
| Taedium Vitae (1999) | Febris Erotica (1999) | Dea (2001) |

Febris Erotica is the second EP by the Russian power metal band Catharsis. It was released in 1999 by Isolated Records. In 2004, the EP, together with the Dea album, was released by Irond.

It was rated an 8.5 out of 10 by HeavyMusic.ru.

== Track listing ==
1. "Silentium" – 1:25
2. "Febris Erotica" – 5:31
3. "Towards the Acme" – 4:49
4. "Taedium Vitae (part I)" – 6:20
5. "Taedium Vitae Part II" – 3:57

The EP also contains 3 bonus video tracks:

1. "The Making of Febris Erotica"
2. "My Love the Phiery (live)"
3. "A Trip Into Elysium (live)"

== Members ==
- Andrey Kapachov - vocals
- Igor Polyakov - rhythm guitar, acoustic guitar
- Julia Red - keyboards, sound effects
- Anthony Arikh - lead guitar, acoustic guitar
- Vladimir Muchnov - drums
- Roman Senkin - bass
