= Theater of Dimensions =

Studio album by Xandria
- Released: 27 January 2017
- Genre: Symphonic metal Power metal
- Length: 74:25 (standard edition); 93:55 (mediabook edition)
- Label: Napalm
- Producer: Joost van den Broek

Xandria chronology
Fire & Ashes (2015)	Theater of Dimensions (2017)	The Wonders Still Awaiting (2023)

Singles from Theater of Dimensions
- 1. "We Are Murderers (We All)" Released: 16 December 2016; 2. "Call of Destiny" Released: 13 January 2017; 3. "Queen of Hearts Reborn" Released: 25 July 2017; 4. "Ship of Doom" Released: 19 December 2017

Professional ratings
Review scores
Source	Rating
New Noise	4.5/5 stars
Heavy Music Headquarters	3.5/5 stars
laut.de	4/5 stars

Theater of Dimensions is the seventh studio album by German symphonic metal band Xandria. The album was released on 27 January 2017.

This is the second and final studio album to feature vocalist Dianne van Giersbergen and bassist Steven Wussow, as well as the final studio album to feature guitarist Philip Restemeier and drummer Gerit Lamm.

== Track listing ==
Standard edition
No.	Title	Lyrics	Music	Length
1.	"Where the Heart is Home"	Dianne van Giersbergen	Marco Heubaum, Joost van den Broek, Dianne van Giersbergen	6:53
2.	"Death to the Holy"	Marco Heubaum	Marco Heubaum, Joost van den Broek	4:46
3.	"Forsaken Love"	Marco Heubaum	Marco Heubaum, Joost van den Broek	4:20
4.	"Call of Destiny"	Dianne van Giersbergen	Marco Heubaum, Joost van den Broek, Dianne van Giersbergen	4:10
5.	"We Are Murderers (We All)"	Marco Heubaum	Marco Heubaum, Joost van den Broek	5:49
6.	"Dark Night of the Soul"	Dianne van Giersbergen	Marco Heubaum, Joost van den Broek, Dianne van Giersbergen	5:21
7.	"When the Walls Came Down (Heartache Was Born)"	Dianne van Giersbergen	Marco Heubaum, Joost van den Broek, Dianne van Giersbergen	5:11
8.	"Ship of Doom"	Marco Heubaum	Marco Heubaum, Joost van den Broek	4:50
9.	"Ceilí"		Marco Heubaum, Joost van den Broek	3:21
10.	"Song for Sorrow and Woe"	Dianne van Giersbergen	Marco Heubaum, Joost van den Broek, Dianne van Giersbergen	5:24
11.	"Burn Me"	Marco Heubaum	Marco Heubaum, Joost van den Broek	4:42
12.	"Queen of Hearts Reborn"	Dianne van Giersbergen	Marco Heubaum, Joost van den Broek, Dianne van Giersbergen	5:16
13.	"A Theater of Dimensions": I. "Awakening"; II. "The Machine"; III. "A Parallel Sphere"; IV. "A Battle of Minds"; V. "Home in a Dream"	Marco Heubaum, Dianne van Giersbergen	Marco Heubaum, Joost van den Broek, Dianne van Giersbergen	14:22
Total length:				74:25

Acoustic bonus disc (mediabook edition)
No.	Title	Length
14.	"Call of Destiny" (acoustic)	5:04
15.	"Dark Night of the Soul" (acoustic)	4:33
16.	"In Remembrance" (acoustic)	2:54
17.	"Sweet Atonement" (acoustic)	3:31
18.	"Valentine" (acoustic)	3:28
Total length:		93:55

== Personnel ==
All information from the album booklet.

Xandria

- Dianne van Giersbergen – lead vocals
- Marco Heubaum – guitars, co-producer
- Philip Restemeier – guitars
- Steven Wussow – bass
- Gerit Lamm – drums

Additional musicians

- Henning Basse – vocals on "A Theater of Dimensions"
- Björn Strid – vocals on "We Are Murderers (We All)"
- Ross Thompson – vocals on "Ship of Doom"
- Zaher Zorgati – vocals on "Burn Me"
- Valerio Recenti – backing vocals
- Ben Mathot – violin
- David Faber – cello
- Johannes Schiefner – uilleann pipes
- Jeroen Goossens – whistles
- PA'dam Chamber Choir – choir

Choir

- Maria van Nieukerken – choir conductor
- Annette Vermeulen, Cécile Roovers, Karen Langendonk, Sabine van der Heijden, Andreas Goetze, Angus van Grevenbroek, Jan Douwes, Job Hubatka, Alfrun Schmid, Annemieke Nuijten, Frederique Klooster, Ruth Becker, Daan Verlaan, Dierderik Rooker, Leon van Liere, René Veen

Production

- Joost van den Broek – producer, recording, mixing, keyboards, narration on "A Theater of Dimensions"
- Jos Driessen – engineering
- Stefan Heilemann – photography, artwork, layout
- Darius van Helfteren – mastering

== Charts ==
Chart (2017)	Peak position
Austrian Albums (Ö3 Austria)	56
Belgian Albums (Ultratop Flanders)	95
Belgian Albums (Ultratop Wallonia)	89
Dutch Albums (Album Top 100)	121
German Albums (Offizielle Top 100)	17
Swiss Albums (Schweizer Hitparade)	25
