= Ahora y Siempre =

Ahora y Siempre may refer to:

- Ahora y Siempre (Alacranes Musical album)
- Ahora y Siempre (La Mafia album)

== See also ==
- Now and Forever (disambiguation)
