= Ex Libris (band) =

Dutch metal band

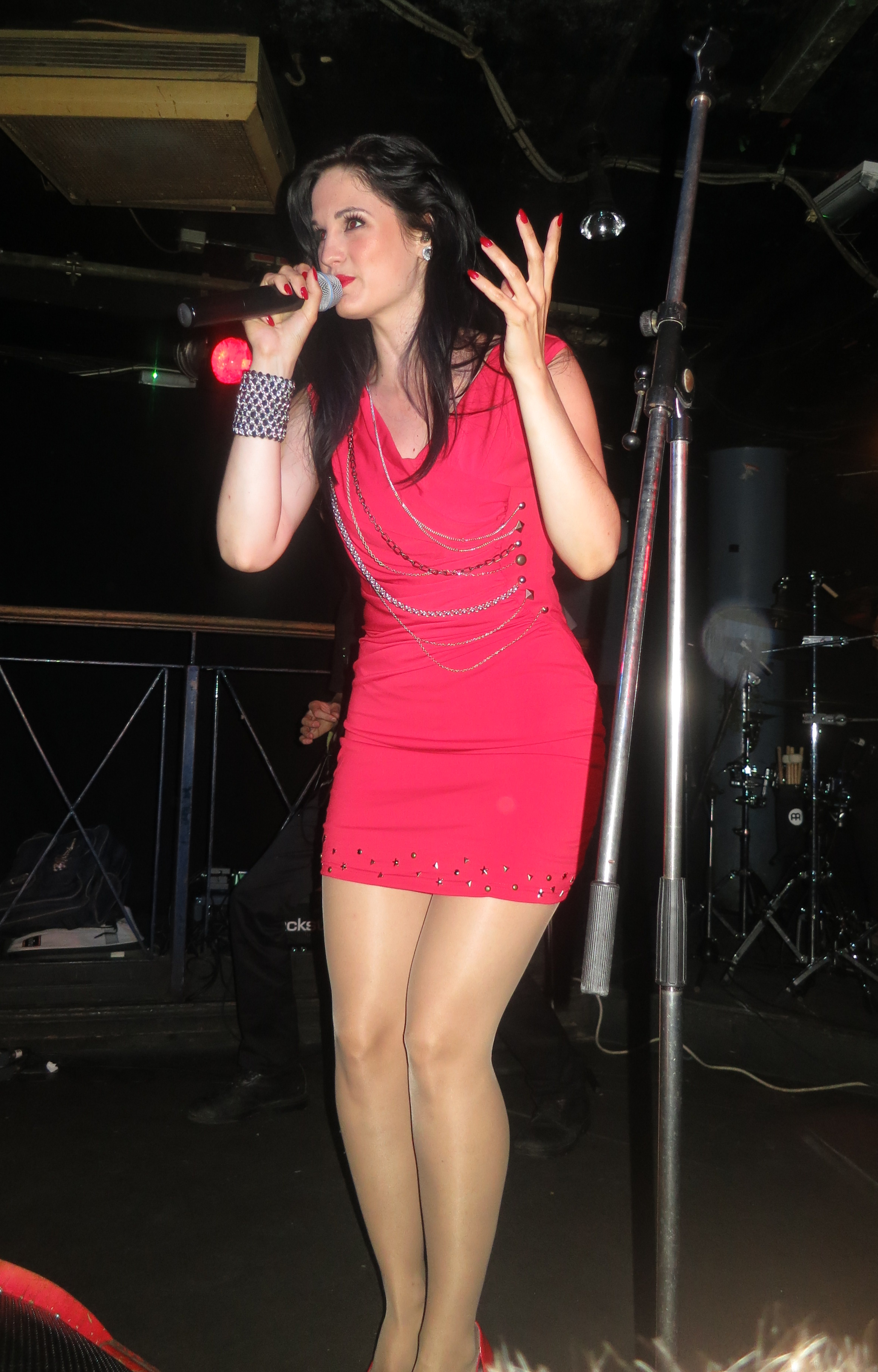
- Frontwoman Dianne van Giersbergen in 2014

Background information
- Also known as: Erinyen
- Origin: Boxtel, Netherlands
- Genres: Symphonic metal Progressive metal
- Years active: 2003–present
- Label: Independent
- Members: Dianne van Giersbergen; Bob Wijtsma; Luuk van Gerven; Harmen Kieboom; Joost van den Broek
- Past members: Bram van Breugel; Eva Albers; Joost van de Pas; Paul van den Broek; Eelco van der Meer; Peter den Bakker; Koen Stam
- Website: exlibrismusic.com

Ex Libris (Latin for from the books) is a Dutch symphonic/progressive metal band founded in 2004 by Dianne van Giersbergen and Joost van de Pas.

== History ==
=== Formation (2003) ===
Ex Libris formed in 2003 in the Netherlands. Operatic soprano Dianne van Giersbergen leads the band. In 2004, with the addition of guitarist Paul van den Broek and keyboardist Koen Stam, the band's name changed from Erinyen to Ex Libris.

=== Drawn demo and debut album Amygdala (2005–2008) ===
In 2005, they released a 4-song demo, Drawn. They started playing more shows and bassist Peter den Bakker joined the band while recording their debut album. Amygdala was released in 2008, featuring demo tracks from Drawn, "Dawn of Sugars" and "Breath with Me". The album was well received.

Ex Libris supported shows with other Dutch symphonic metal bands such as Epica, Stream of Passion and ReVamp. They played abroad, in Germany, France, Belgium and the United Kingdom (with Delain).

=== Line-up changes and Medea (2011–2014) ===
In 2011, Ex Libris returned to the studio and recorded a three-track demo, "Medea", for their upcoming album.

In 2013 drummer Joost van de Pas was replaced by Eelco van der Meer, who toured with Stream of Passion in 2012. Around the same time, Dianne became the new front-woman for German symphonic metal band Xandria, right after the departure of Manuela Kraller, without leaving Ex Libris.

The new album Medea is a concept album about the Greek tragedy of Medea and her lover Jason. The album was funded via an IndieGogo campaign with the goal of €2,000, which passed the goal with €3,549. The album was released independently in January 2014.

In June 2014, drummer Eelco van der Meer departed.

=== Ann (2017–present) ===
Ex Libris began work on their third studio album, a metal trilogy called Ann. It was divided into three chapters, each one about a different Ann that lived in different times and places, sharing the same fate – death. The first chapter, called Anne Boleyn, was released on 1 August 2018. The second one, called Anastasia Romanova, was released on 15 March 2019. The third and final chapter, called Anne Frank, was released on 15 November 2019 along with the complete edition with all three EPs.

== Discography ==
Studio albums

- Amygdala (2008)
- Medea (2014)
- Ann (2019)
  - Chapter 1: Anne Boleyn (2018)
  - Chapter 2: Anastasia Romanova (2019)
  - Chapter 3: Anne Frank (2019)

== Band members ==
Current

- Dianne van Giersbergen – vocals (2003–present)
- Bob Wijtsma – guitars (2015–present)
- Luuk van Gerven – bass guitar (2015–present)
- Harmen Kieboom – drums (2015–present)
- Joost van den Broek – keyboards (2019–present)

Former

- Bram van Breugel – bass (2004–2006)
- Eva Albers – guitars (2004–2009)
- Joost van de Pas – drums (2003–2012)
- Paul van den Broek – lead guitars (2003–2014)
- Eelco van der Meer – drums (2013–2014)
- Peter den Bakker – bass (2007–2014)
- Koen Stam – keyboards (2003–2019)
