= Dianne van Giersbergen =

Dutch singer

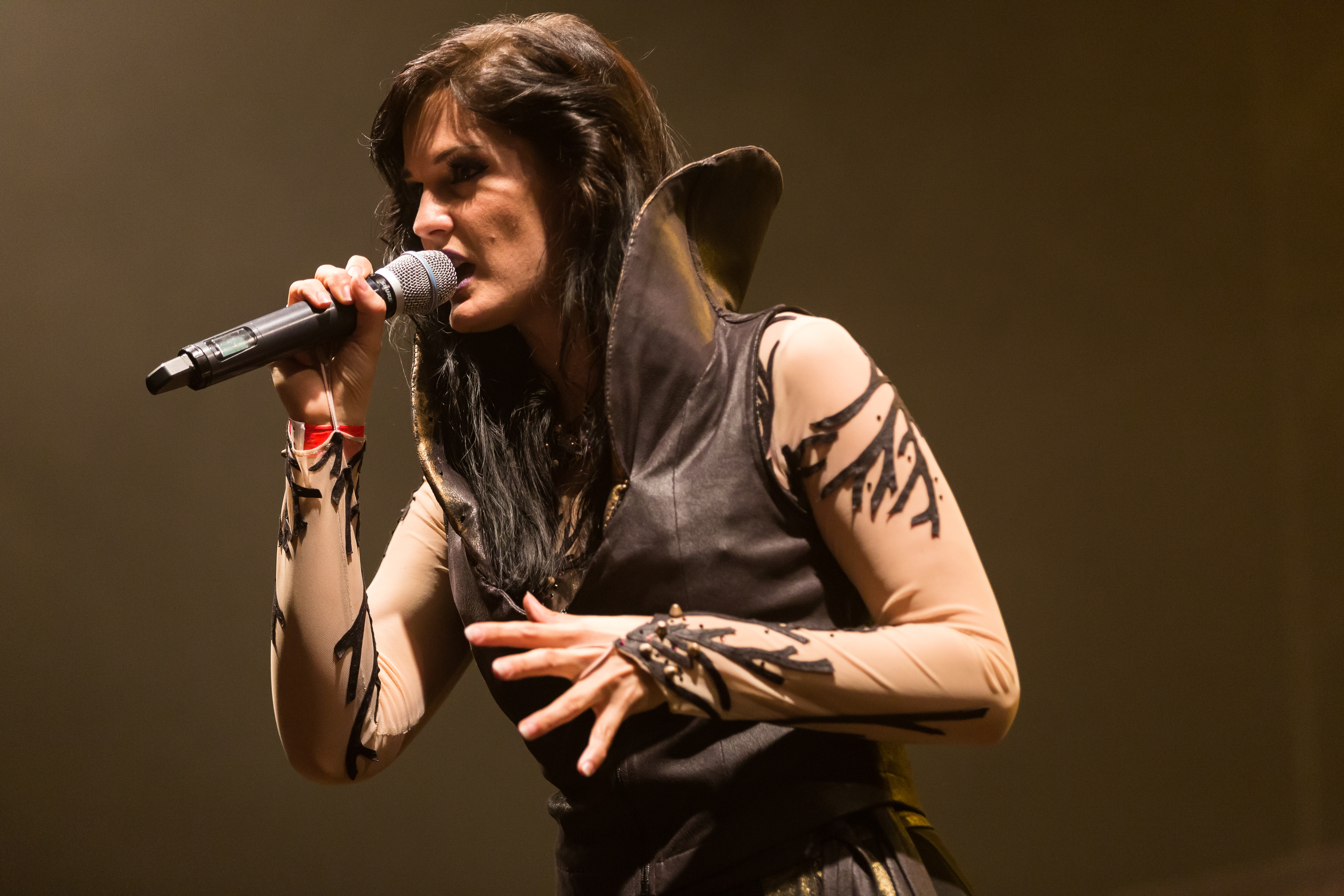
- Van Giersbergen performing in 2017

Background information
- Born: Dianne van Giersbergen; 3 June 1985 (age 40); Liempde, Netherlands
- Genres: Symphonic metal, power metal, progressive metal
- Occupation: Singer
- Years active: 2003–present
- Label: Napalm Records
- Website: diannevangiersbergen.com

Dianne van Giersbergen is a Dutch spinto soprano singer. She is the founder and frontwoman of the progressive metal band Ex Libris, and she was the vocalist of German symphonic metal band Xandria from 2013 to 2017.

She is not related to fellow Dutch rock/metal singer Anneke van Giersbergen.

== Early life and education ==
Van Giersbergen received her first singing lessons as a birthday present from her parents at the age of four. In the following years, she was taught by several professors and sang in several choirs. In 2005, she began studying classical music at the ArtEZ School of Music where she focused on classical singing and musical theater. In 2009, she received her degree with honors.

Meanwhile, van Giersbergen expanded her vocal technique and began to combine her classical training with heavy metal music. She also worked on the theory of composition, wrote poetry and organized classical music concerts.

== Career ==
=== Ex Libris (2004–present) ===
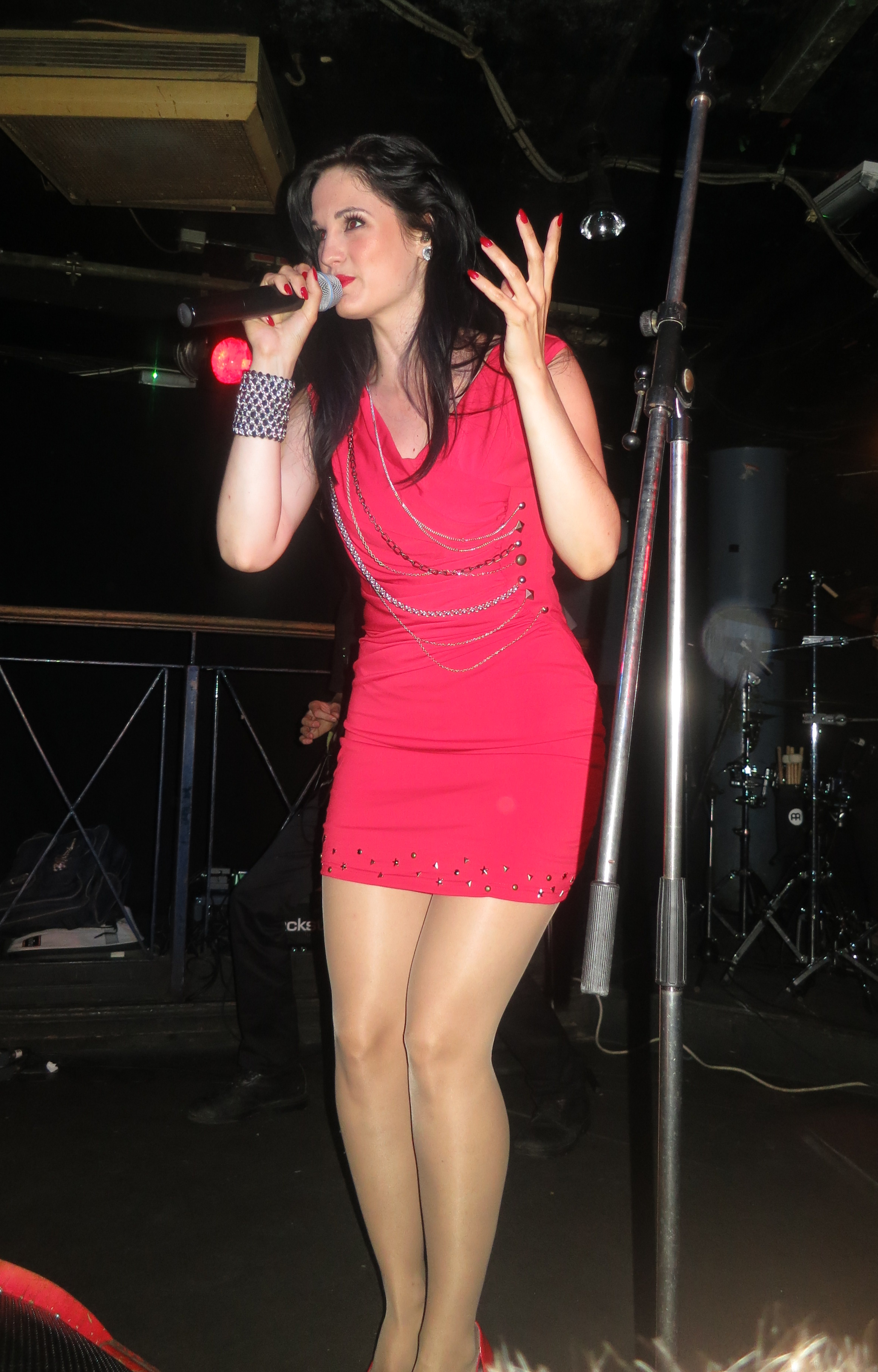
Van Giersbergen performing with Ex Libris in 2014

After graduating with a Bachelor and master's degree from the ArtEZ school and perfecting the combination of classical techniques with progressive metal music, van Giersbergen formed Ex Libris along with drummer Joost van de Pas.

Their debut album "Amygdala" was released in 2009. The album was well received by critics and fans, and the band started to act as support for shows of other Dutch symphonic metal bands such as Epica, Delain, Stream of Passion or ReVamp. They also played shows abroad in countries such as Germany, France, Belgium and the United Kingdom, where the band started to receive attention.

Their second album "Medea", based on a Greek tragedy, was released in January 2014, financed independently through crowdfunding.

Their third studio album Ann – A Progressive Metal Trilogy appeared in 2019, featuring three "Chapters" (each consisting of three songs) about three female historical characters who met an untimely death (Anne Boleyn, Anastasia Romanova and Anne Frank).

=== Xandria (2013–2017) ===
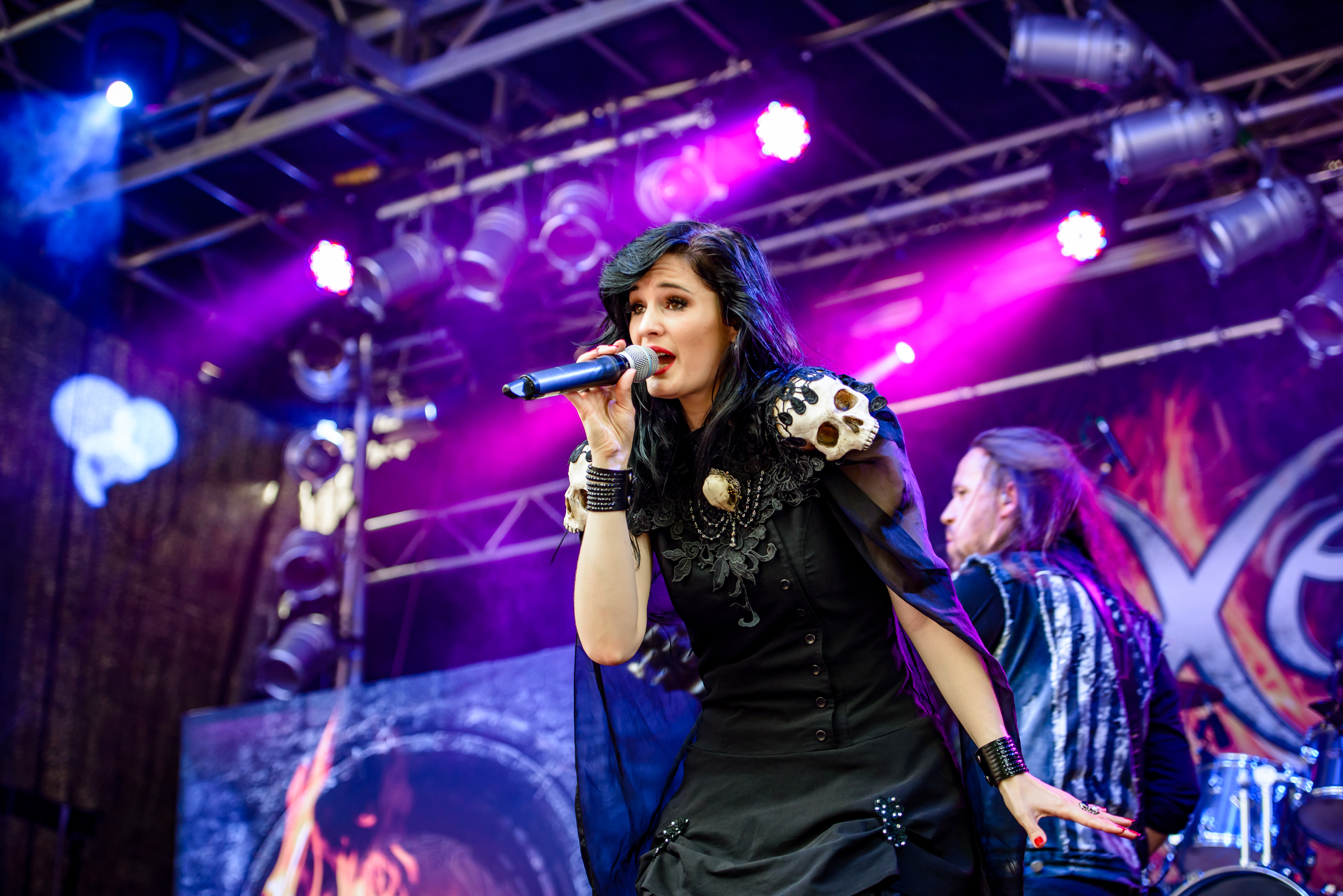
Van Giersbergen performing with Xandria in 2016

On 25 October 2013, van Giersbergen was presented as the new lead singer of the German symphonic metal band Xandria after the departure of Manuela Kraller. On 28 November 2013, was her first live debut with Xandria in Madrid, Spain. Her debut album with the band was released on 2 May 2014, named Sacrificium.

On 31 July 2015, her second work with Xandria called Fire & Ashes was released with a total of seven tracks: three new songs, two remakes of well known Xandria classics, and two cover songs.

On 27 January 2017, her third and last work with Xandria titled Theater of Dimensions was released.

On 13 September 2017, she left Xandria for personal reasons and tensions with the other band members.

=== Solo career (2022–present) ===
Van Giersbergen announced on 19 October 2022, that she would begin working on her debut solo album alongside Joost van den Broek. The album, which will be called Soulward Bound, also contains the single "After the Storm", which was released on 14 February 2023. During a live chat on the release day of the single, van Giersbergen revealed that it might take five years for the album to come out. Four other singles were released in support of the album: "Unleash the Siren", "A Symphonic Tragedy", "Flameborn", "The Elders' Call", and "Phantom of War".

On 3 April 2026, Dianne Van Giersbergen released her single entitled "The Quietude", featuring her vocal teacher Elena Vink on soprano guest vocals, Johanna van Brabandt on child guest soprano vocals, Ben Mathot on violin, and Apocalyptica's Perttu Kivilaakso on cello.

== Reviews ==
Van Giersbergen's vocal and performing delivery can pull in the audience, according to a review in Mindbreed. Reviewer Tim Blevins in 2014 noted that Giersbergen seemed to be a "good fit" for the band Xandria. Reviewer Eric May in 2013 in New Noise magazine described her as a "sultry siren" and wrote that there was "something majestically powerful in her mesmerizing vocal harmonies." Another reviewer described her vocals as "breathtaking" with great personality, charisma and charm.

== Discography ==
Studio albums:

- Soulward Bound (TBA)

Singles:

- "After the Storm" (2023)
- "Unleash the Siren" (2023)
- "A Symphonic Tragedy" (2024)
- "Flameborn" (2024)
- "The Elders' Call" (2025)
- "Phantom of War" (2025)
- "The Quietude" (2026)

=== Ex Libris ===
Studio albums:

- Amygdala (2008)
- Medea (2014)
- Ann (A Progressive Metal Trilogy) (2019)

EPs:

- Ann – Chapter 1: Anne Boleyn (2018)
- Ann – Chapter 2: Anastasia Romanova (2019)
- Ann – Chapter 3: Anne Frank (2019)

=== Xandria ===
Studio albums:

- Sacrificium (2014)
- Theater of Dimensions (2017)

EPs:

- Fire & Ashes (2015)

=== Guest appearances ===
- Дитя штормов (Child of Storms) by Catharsis (2015)
- Electric Castle Live by Ayreon (2019)
- Transitus by Ayreon (2020)
- Eden by Archie Caine (2022)
- Tommy and the Angels by Archie Caine (2022)
- Bluebeard's Chamber by Blackbriar (2025)
