= Ravenheart =

Studio album by Xandria
- Released: 24 May 2004
- Recorded: December 2003 – February 2004
- Studio: Pleasurepark Studios, Belgium
- Genre: Gothic metal, symphonic metal
- Length: 49:53
- Label: Drakkar Entertainment
- Producer: José Alvarez-Brill

Xandria chronology
Kill the Sun (2003)	Ravenheart (2004)	India (2005)

Singles from Ravenheart
- 1. "Ravenheart" Released: 2004; 2. "Eversleeping" Released: 11 October 2004

Ravenheart is the second studio album by German symphonic metal band Xandria, released on 24 May 2004 via Drakkar Entertainment label. The record includes two singles: "Ravenheart" and "Eversleeping".

== Overview ==
With their second album Xandria suddenly became known in the gothic and metal scene, acquiring many new listeners thanks to the title track and its accompanying music video.

Recorded and mixed in the Belgian studio of producer José Alvarez-Brill (Wolfsheim, among others), in the months of December 2003 to February 2004, the album presents many different musical styles; in fact, together with the producer the band experimented with soundtrack-like tracks, bombastic arrangements, modern guitar riffs, and rhythmic samples.

About the making of Ravenheart, Xandria's main composer and guitarist Marco Heubaum said:

We didn't want to stand still. After the tours following the debut, I had many new ideas and wanted to try out many things. The debut album was like a well-knit statement on whose basis new territory could be opened up, further musical dreams could be realized now. So not only the orchestral bombast and the many new sound opportunities, which were possible due to the gained experience and the new producer, were something attractive and new, but in connection with the enthusiasm for soundtrack elements also for example a number such as "Some Like It Cold", which should sound like a James Bond title song. Also new to the work on this album was that I wrote songs together with Lisa more than for the debut. There is also a song by then bass player Roland on the album—his farewell, so to speak, for he left the band right after the recordings.

Ravenheart was released on 24 May 2004, one year after Kill the Sun, and received very good reviews, entering the German album charts at number 36, still higher than the debut album; it remained in the German Top 100 for seven weeks.

Heubaum commented:

Of course we were very surprised by this success! When, about the end of the production process, we realized what a variable and many-sided album we had recorded, at times we even had doubts as to whether an album with so many different ideas and elements would go down well with the people at all. But success proved us right in most of all working as we ourselves liked it best and being convinced of what we do. This then seems to spread to the people.

== Track listing ==
All lyrics are written by Lisa Schaphaus, except tracks 3 and 10 by Marco Heubaum.

No.	Title	Music	Length
1.	"Ravenheart"	Heubaum, Schaphaus	3:44
2.	"The Lioness"	Heubaum, Schaphaus	4:49
3.	"Back to the River"	Heubaum	3:35
4.	"Eversleeping"	Schaphaus	3:40
5.	"Fire of Universe"	Heubaum, Schaphaus	3:33
6.	"Some Like It Cold"	Heubaum, Schaphaus	3:56
7.	"Answer"	Heubaum	4:45
8.	"My Scarlet Name"	Heubaum, Philip Restemeier, Schaphaus	5:22
9.	"Snow-White"	Heubaum, Schaphaus	4:07
10.	"Black Flame"	Heubaum	3:29
11.	"Too Close to Breathe"	Roland Krueger, Gerit Lamm, Schaphaus	4:38
12.	"Keep My Secret Well"	Schaphaus	4:15
Total length:			49:53

== Personnel ==
All information from the album booklet.

Xandria

- Lisa Schaphaus – vocals
- Marco Heubaum – guitars, keyboards, programming, vocals
- Philip Restemeier – guitars, choir vocals
- Roland Krueger – bass on tracks 6, 7, 10, 11
- Gerit Lamm – drums

Additional musicians

- Daniel Joeriskes – bass on tracks 1–5, 8, 9, 12
- Henning Verlage – keyboards, programming
- Zoran Grujovski – keyboards, programming
- Yogi Rangeshvar – sitar
- Achim Färber – additional percussion

Choir

- Mara Bach, Nina Brummel, Luisa Brunger, Vanessa Epp, Elena Knafla, Isabel Latussek, Melani Mehwinsk, Johanees Monkenbusch, Desirée Schnittker, Wolfgang Schulte, Hanna Vedder, Christian Wittneben, Juliane Wittneben

Production

- José Alvarez-Brill – producer, keyboards, programming
- Kai Hoffmann – artwork
- Mazen Murad – mastering
- Dirk Schelpmeier – photography
