= Lisa Middelhauve =

German vocalist and pianist (born 1980)

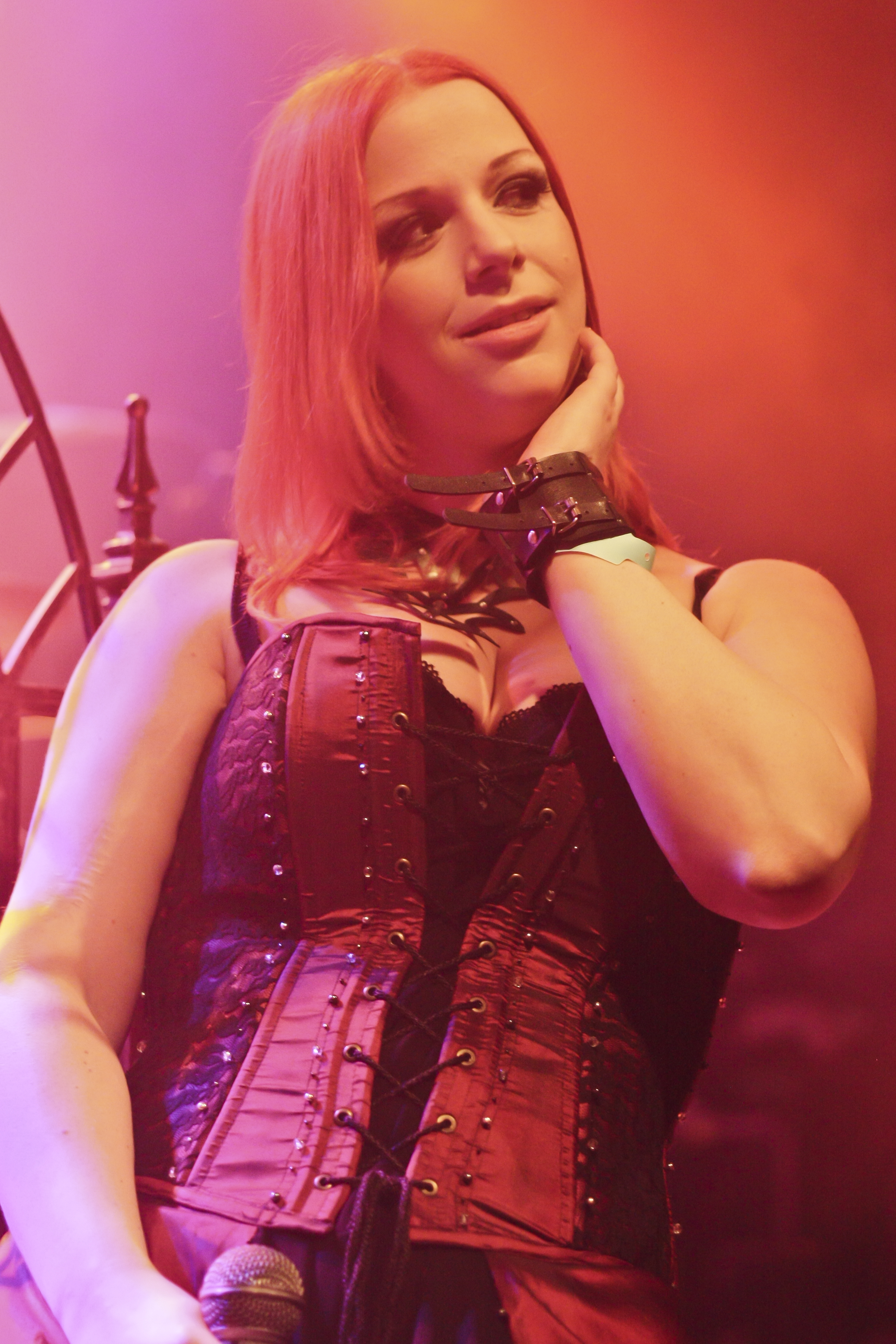
- Lisa Middelhauve in concert in Salzburg, 2011

Background information
- Born: Elisabeth Schaphaus; 28 November 1980 (age 45); Bielefeld, West Germany
- Origin: Bielefeld, Germany
- Genre: Symphonic metal
- Instruments: Vocals, piano
- Years active: 2000–2012
- Label: Drakkar Entertainment

Elisabeth Rodermund, known professionally as Lisa Middelhauve (born Elisabeth Schaphaus on 28 November 1980), is a German musician, better known as the former lead vocalist and pianist (on the earliest works) of German symphonic metal band Xandria from early 2000, until April 2008, but returned as their singer in 2010, only to finish the remaining live shows due to their second lead vocalist, Kerstin Bischof's departure.

After Xandria, in late 2010, Lisa Middelhauve performed a few shows as guest singer for the French philharmonic metal band Whyzdom. She also joined Austrian symphonic metal band Serenity for several shows and Delain for their whole 2011 European tour.

== Early life ==
By the time she was 3-years-old she began playing the keyboard. In 1986, she received violin lessons, called "Mozartine". In 1990, her violin teacher found Lisa to be very talented, but in 1994 only to appealed to be "hopeless" on the violin and quit. But Lisa remained faithful to the piano and wrote songs about failed relationships at the age of 13 years. A year later, she decided to sing in the opera believing it would not be that difficult, but she departed from the opera going for a more rock oriented technique.

== Musical career ==
=== With Xandria (2000–2008; 2010) ===
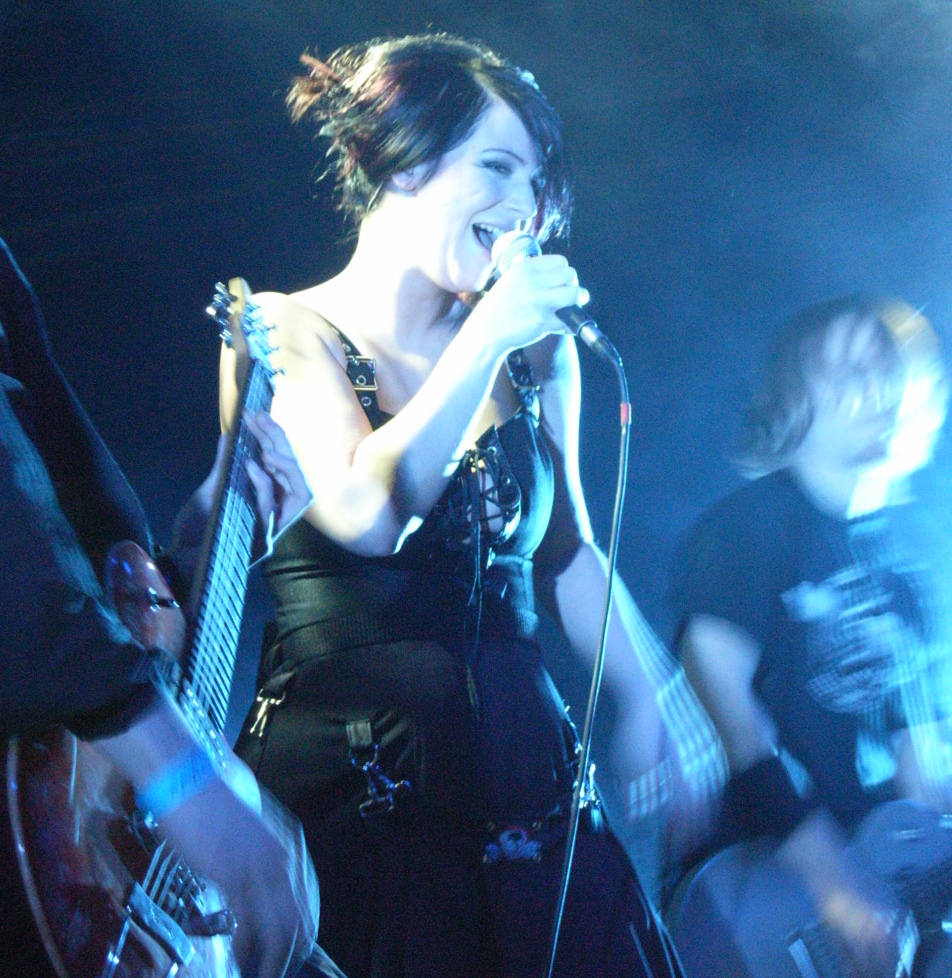
Middelhauve in 2006

Between 1998 and 2000, Lisa participated in a crazy party at the Irish Pub, until she was discovered by Marco. It was her biggest desire to join with Xandria, even before their debut album.

Lisa co-wrote lyrics throughout her whole career with Xandria and as well performed on the piano on the earliest works.

In April 2008, Middelhauve left the band, citing personal reasons and discomfort at being the band's front woman, which was announced weeks later when Lisa had already left the band on their last tour with her.

However, after replacement singer Kerstin Bischof left the band, she agreed to return for several concerts in spring 2010. The band stated Middelhauve will not enter the band again.

=== Solo work (2009–2012) ===
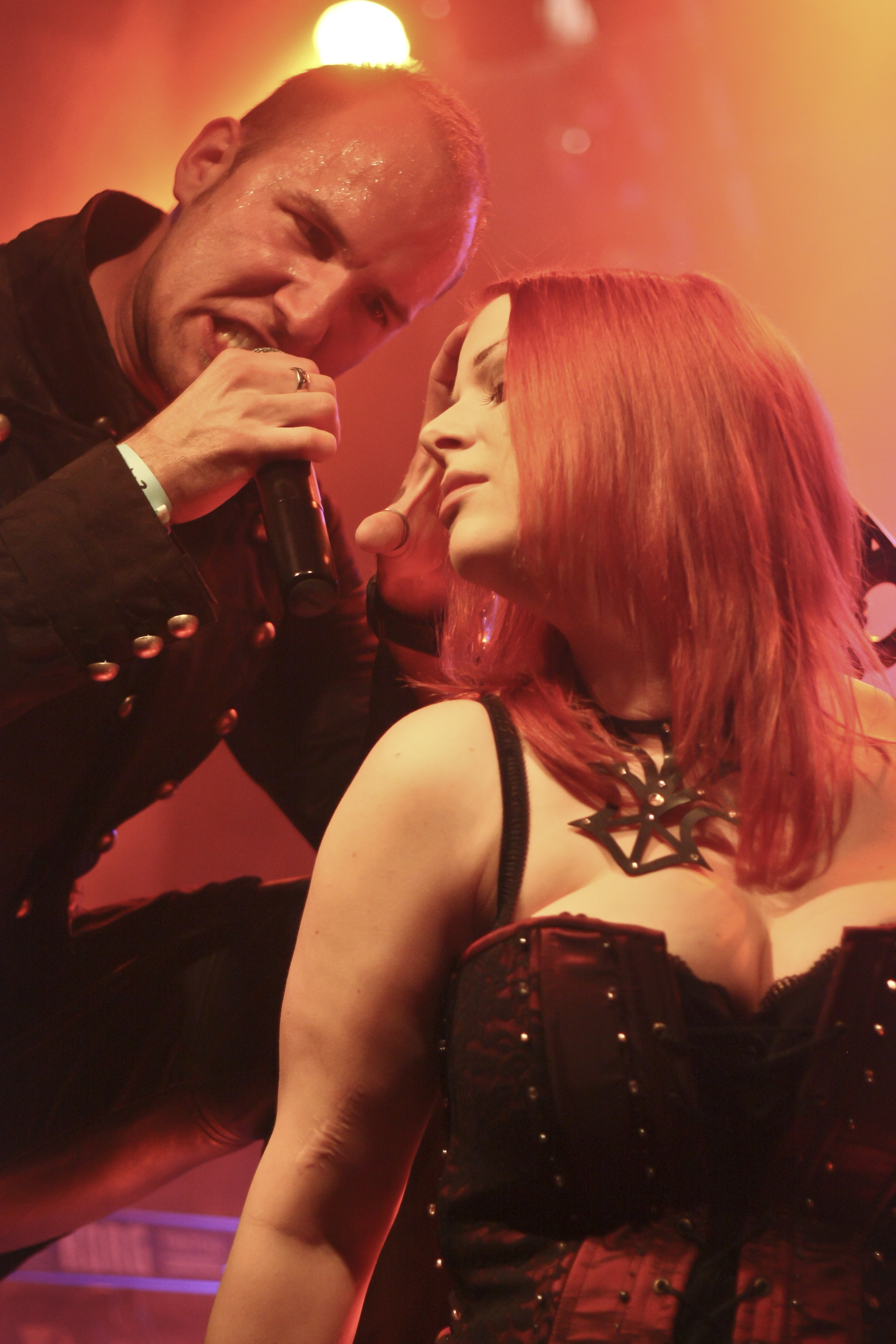
Middelhauve in a duet with Serenity singer Georg Neuhauser in 2011

Following her departure, Lisa had begun writing and recording material for her future solo album. Many demos were released through YouTube on how they would sound. But Lisa put her solo work on hold in 2010 when the remaining members of Xandria asked Lisa to come back to finish the remaining live shows after their singer, Kerstin Bischof also had left the band.

In 2012, she announced through her Facebook, that she had returned to the studio to finish the process of releasing her solo material, and had released some previews on her SoundCloud account. However, in a 2016 Facebook post, she stated that she had no idea if she was ever going to perform on stage or record music again.

== Personal life ==
In August 2005, Lisa married bandmate Nils Middelhauve, the bassist for Xandria at the time. On 16 December 2013 Lisa announced via Facebook that she and her husband had divorced. Some years later, she announced that she's married her new partner and will be named Elisabeth Rodermund from now. Her daughter was born in January 2018.

== Discography ==
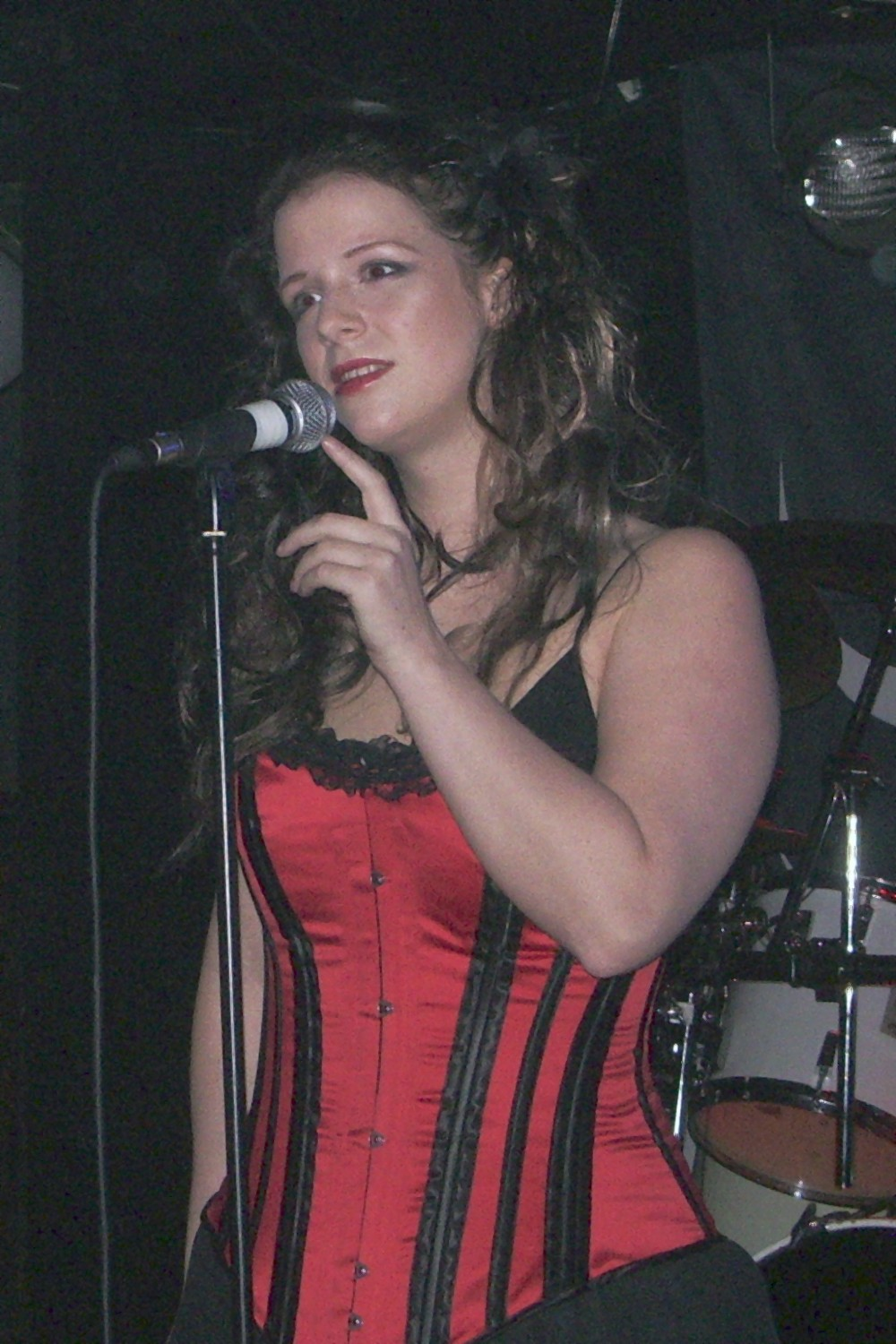
Middelhauve in 2006

=== Xandria ===
Studio albums:

- Kill the Sun (2003)
- Ravenheart (2004)
- India (2005)
- Salomé – The Seventh Veil (2007)
