= Xandria =

German symphonic metal band

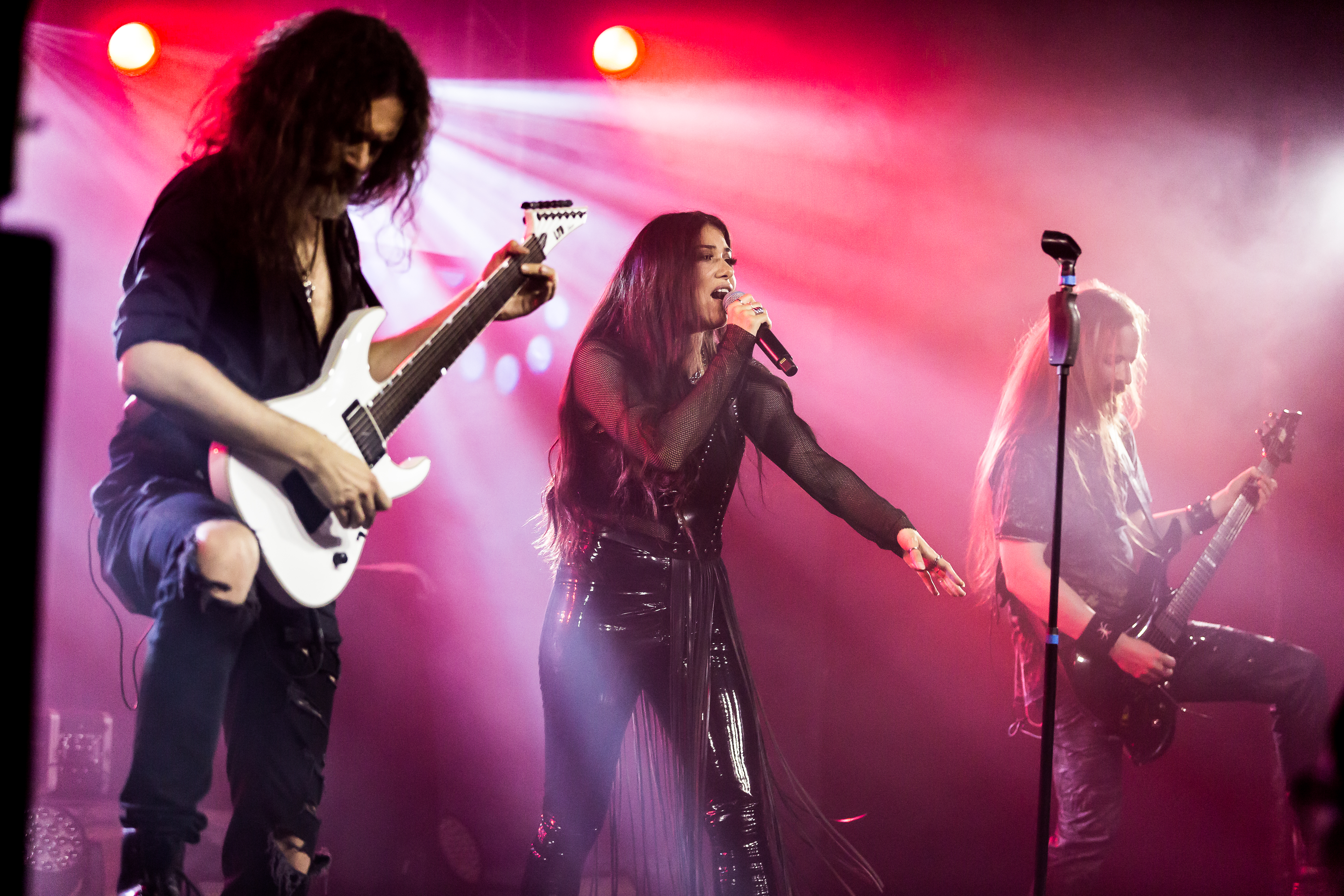
- Xandria performing in 2022

Background information
- Origin: Bielefeld, Germany
- Genres: Symphonic metal; power metal; gothic metal
- Years active: 1994–1997; 1999–present
- Labels: Drakkar (2003–2011); Napalm (2011–present)
- Members: Marco Heubaum; Ambre Vourvahis; Dimitrios Gatsios; Rob Klawonn
- Past members: See below
- Website: xandria.de

Xandria is a German symphonic metal band founded by Marco Heubaum in 1994. Originally a project, Heubaum later restarted the project as a band in 1999, and has gone through various lineup changes. The German vocalist Lisa Middelhauve joined for the debut album, co-writing both music and lyrics for the band until her departure in 2008. Middelhauve reunited briefly with the band in 2010 following the departure of the band's second vocalist Kerstin Bischof, but left again shortly after. Manuela Kraller joined the band as the new vocalist in 2010.

The band released Neverworld's End in 2012, which was the only album to feature Kraller as she would depart in 2013. Dianne van Giersbergen was later announced as her replacement, and would record two studio albums with Xandria: Sacrificium and Theater of Dimensions. She left Xandria in 2017, citing personal reasons and tensions within the band. In 2022, the band had announced another lineup change, with the addition of the band's new vocalist Ambre Vourvahis. The band released their eighth studio album, The Wonders Still Awaiting, in February 2023. In August 2026, the band released their ninth studio album, Eclipse.

Since their formation, Xandria has released nine studio albums and two EPs.

== History ==
Xandria was started as a project band in 1994 in Bielefeld by Marco Heubaum, the band's main composer and at the time vocalist, and a friend to play drums, but disbanded in 1997 after recording one demo.

The band was restarted with a different lineup in 1999. Heubaum stepped down from the role of vocalist and was joined by local musician Roland Krueger on bass. In 2000, they recorded one demo that was released on the internet and after its release, drummer Gerit Lamm joined the band. Nicole Tobien (credited as 'Isis') recorded the demo but then left the band to follow other plans and was replaced by Lisa Schaphaus. At the same time, writing of the debut album started.

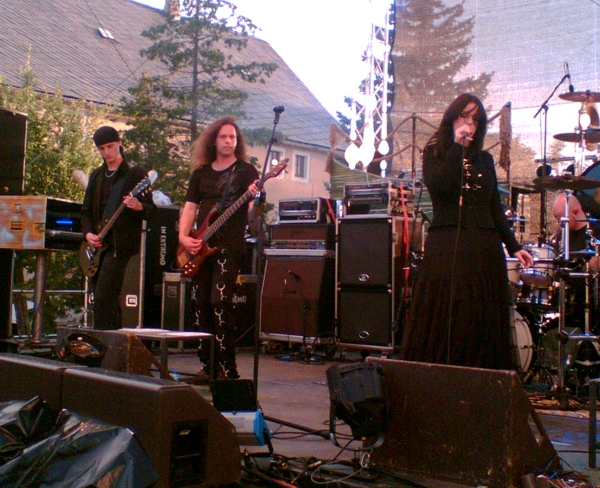
Xandria performing with Lisa Middelhauve in 2007.

In 2002, the band signed to Drakkar Records and was joined by Philip Restemeier as lead guitarist. As work on the debut album progressed, the band started playing shows in and around Bielefeld. In the winter of 2002, the band entered the studio to record their debut album, Kill the Sun. They released Kill the Sun in May 2003, and it reached No. 98 on the German music charts. To promote the album, the band played a few shows with Schandmaul and Subway to Sally. Then they went on a three-week tour of Germany with Tanzwut.

After playing some festivals in support of Kill the Sun, the band started writing their second album. Recording of the album began in December 2003 at Pleasure Park Studios, with producer José Alvarez-Brill. Production on the album was finished in February 2004. Shortly after the recordings were completed, bassist Roland Krueger left the band and was replaced by Nils Middelhauve. Ravenheart was released on 24 May 2004, and it stayed on the charts for seven weeks, reaching No. 36.

In 2005 they released their third album, India, which reached No. 30 on the German charts. Xandria began recording their fourth album, Salomé – The Seventh Veil, on 14 December 2006. It was released on 25 May 2007 and reached No. 41 on the German charts.

Lisa Middelhauve (née Schaphaus) resigned on 30 April 2008 citing personal reasons and discomfort in being the band's frontwoman. The band found a new singer in February 2009, Kerstin Bischof a.k.a. Lakonia, best known for her collaborations with the band Axxis. However, after one year Kerstin Bischof left the band to concentrate on a different career, and Middelhauve replaced her for a series of concerts in Summer 2010. On 19 December 2010, Xandria announced the addition of 29-year-old singer Manuela Kraller to the group's ranks. Manuela Kraller made her live debut at the "Classic Meets Pop" event on 7 January 2011 at the Seidensticker Halle in Bielefeld, Germany.

On 24 February 2012, Neverworld's End was released. It was the only album Manuela Kraller made with the band.

On 5 February 2013, the band announced on their website and Facebook page their new bass player Steven Wussow, along with the message that they would enter the studio again for their next studio album the same year.

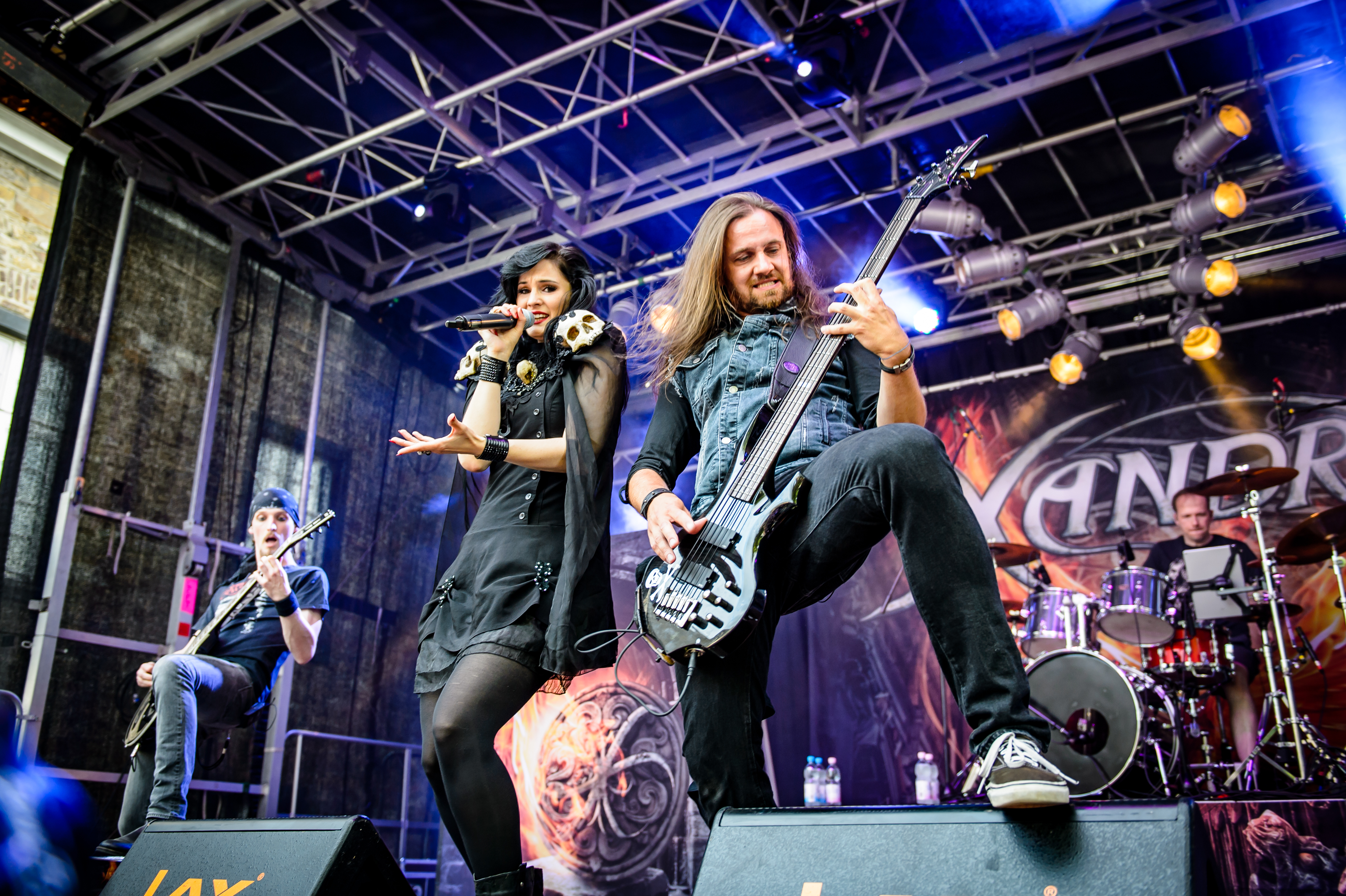
Xandria performing with Dianne van Giersbergen in 2016

On 25 October 2013, the band announced on their website that Kraller had left the band to pursue a different career and announced Dutch Ex Libris singer Dianne van Giersbergen as their new vocalist. Sacrificium was released in the following year. The year after, the band released their first EP, titled Fire & Ashes, on 31 July 2015.

Their seventh album, Theater of Dimensions, was released on 27 January 2017. Following the release of the album, Xandria embarked on a few shows in Europe including their first headlining tour in North America with Kobra and the Lotus and Once Human in May 2017. Due to personal reasons, Xandria had cancelled their upcoming second half of the US tour as well as the Russian tour. Aeva Maurelle from the band Aeverium was the temporary vocalist for the European dates in the fall.

On 13 September 2017, Dianne posted on her Facebook page that she had left Xandria, due to having received pressure to perform from Xandria's management and the band while being physically unable to, giving her stress confirmed by doctors. Two days later, ex-vocalist Manuela Kraller shared a message to the public on her Facebook page, revealing that her reason to leave four years earlier was exactly the same one. She praised Dianne for having the courage to be open about the situation to the public, which she did not dare to at the time, but now finally did. Ex-vocalist Lisa Middelhauve also released a statement about Dianne's departure on the same day. She herein did not only speak about herself but also about ex-bassist Nils Middelhauve, whom she was married to at the time he was in the band but is now divorced from. It can be concluded that he too left Xandria under negative circumstances. Guitarist Phillip Restemeier spoke about the reason behind Dianne's departure in an interview during the European tour.

In 2019, Steven Wussow was later confirmed to have become the new bass player for the German power metal band Orden Ogan on 16 October 2019, signaling his departure from Xandria after one performance that year.

On 24 May 2022, the band posted a music video of their new song "Reborn", where Ambre Vourvahis was announced as the new vocalist. Furthermore, Tim Schwarz was announced as the new bassist, and drummer Dimitrios Gatsios and guitarist Rob Klawonn replacing departing longtime members Gerit Lamm and Philip Restemeier, respectively. On 7 September 2022, the band released another song, "You Will Never Be Our God". With the release of the third single, "Ghosts", the band had also on 3 November 2022, announced their eighth studio album, The Wonders Still Awaiting, which was released on 3 February 2023. The band released their second EP, Universal Tales, on 22 November 2024.

Schwarz left the band on 17 April 2026 to focus on his other band Velvet Rush, with Heubaum temporarily taking over bass during live performances. On 7 May 2026, the band released the single, "The Shannon's Home", and simultaneously announced their upcoming ninth studio album, Eclipse which was released on 7 August 2026.

== Band members ==
Xandria live at Hellraiser in Leipzig

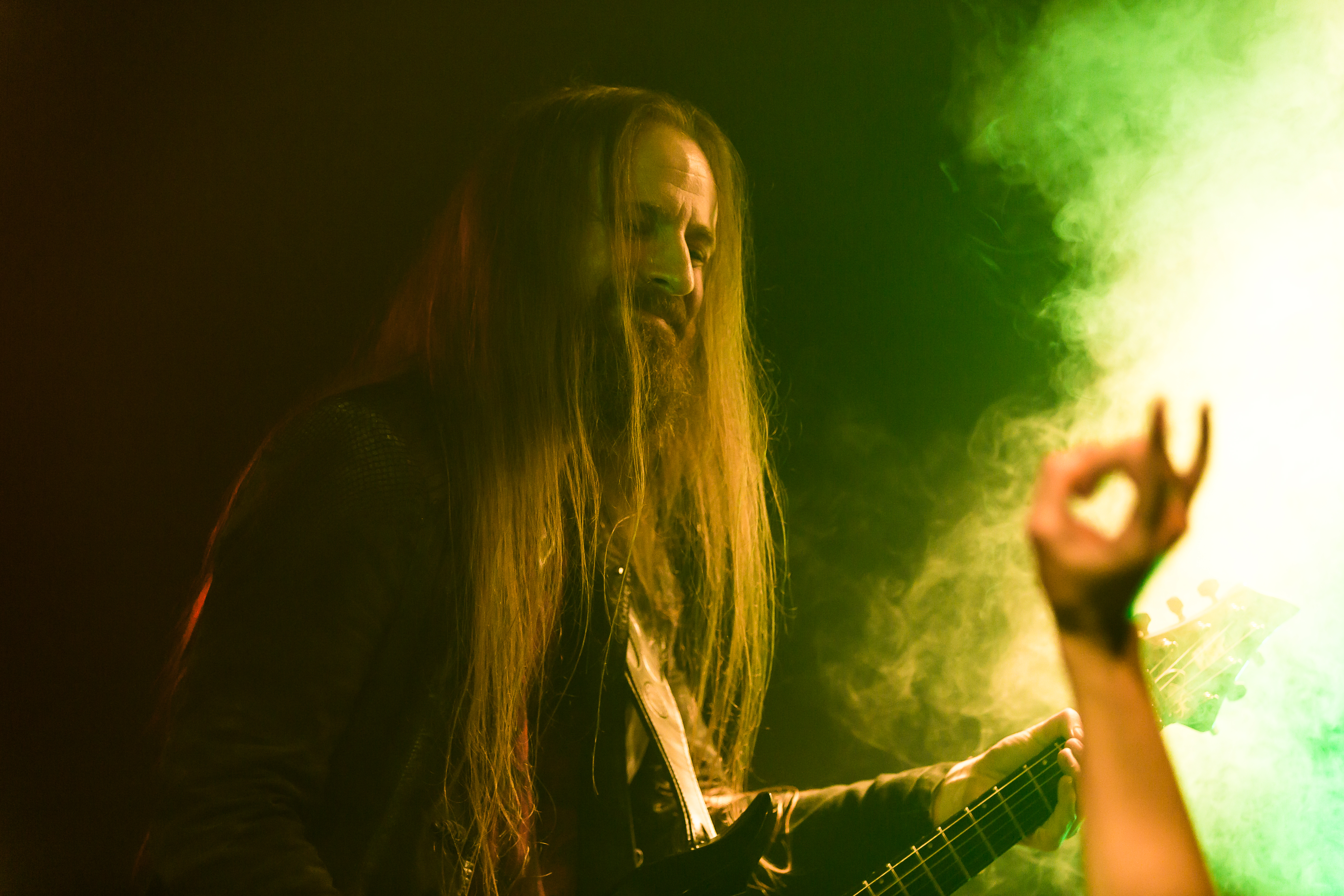
Marco Heubaum

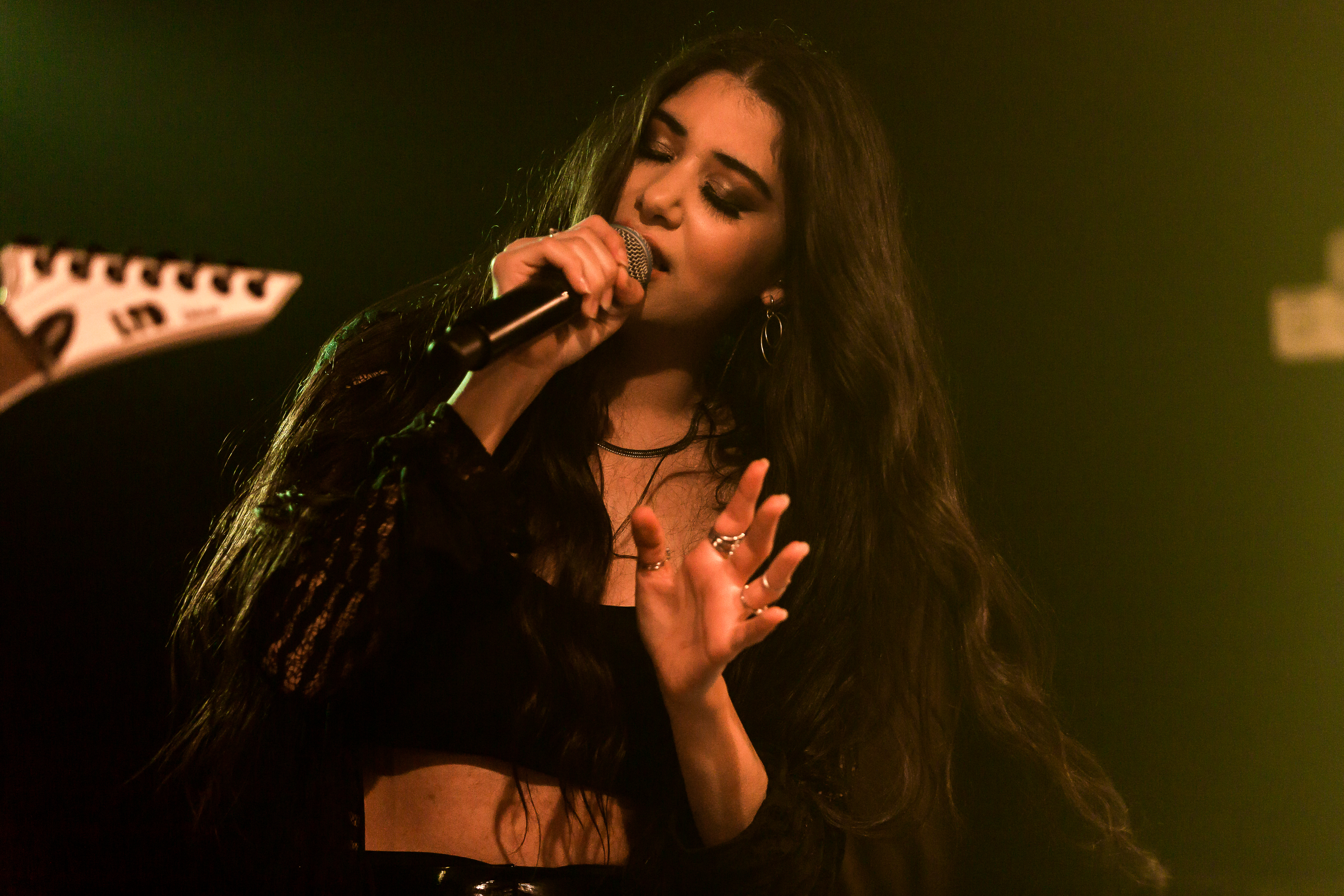
Ambre Vourvahis

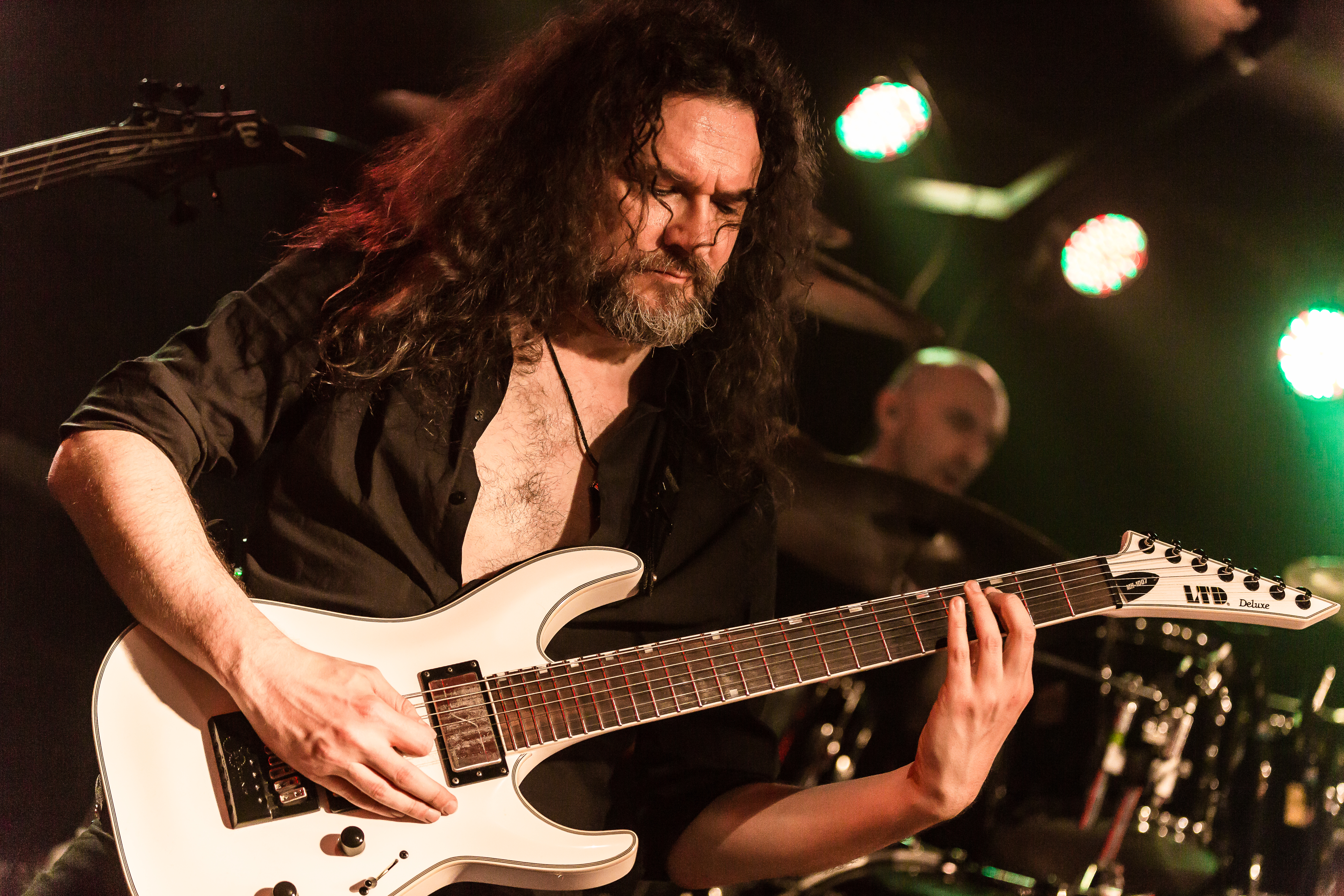
Rob Klawonn

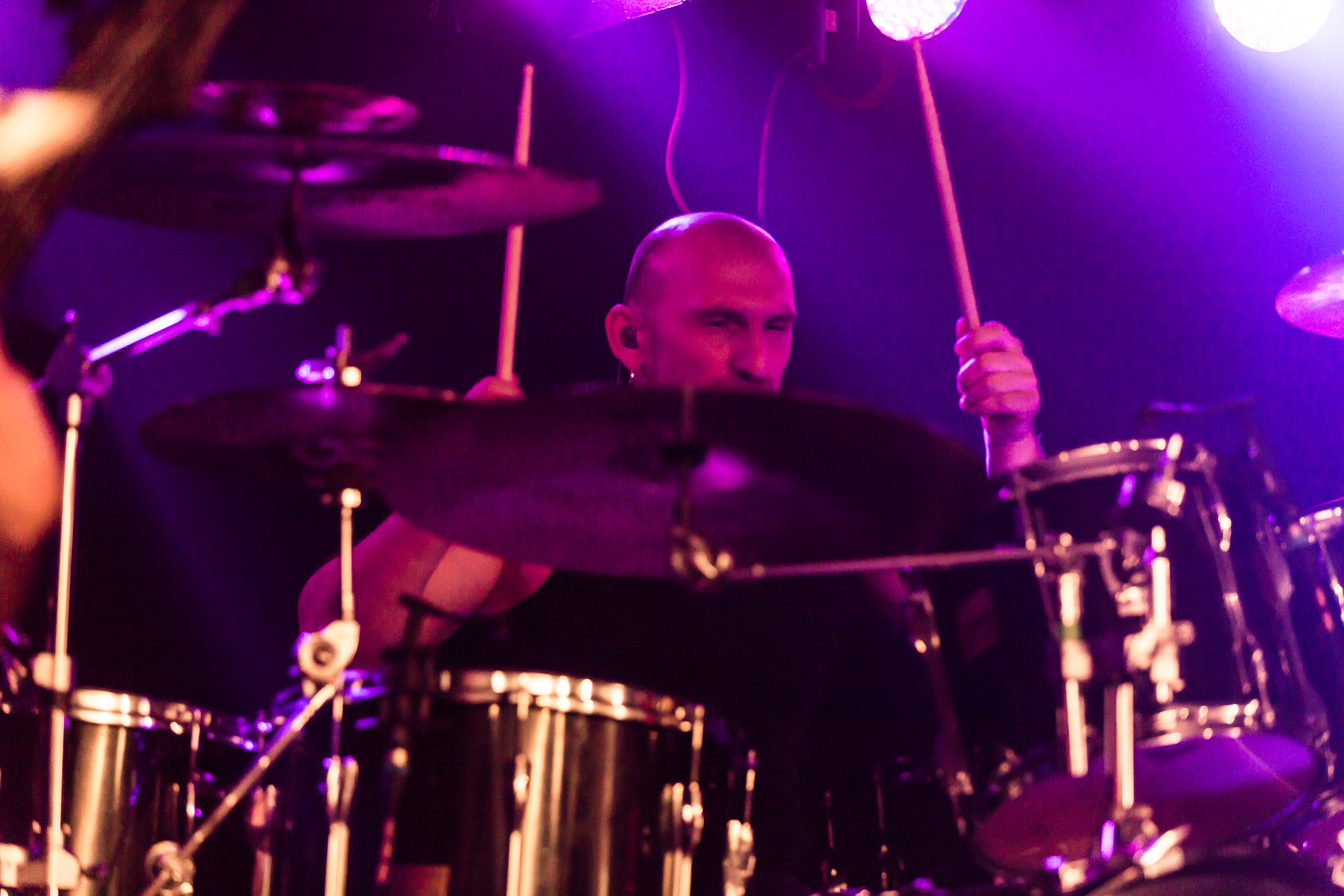
Dimitrios Gatsios

=== Current ===
- Marco Heubaum – rhythm guitar (1994–present), keyboards (1997–present), bass (2026–present), vocals (1994–2001)
- Ambre Vourvahis – vocals (2022–present)
- Rob Klawonn – lead guitar (2022–present)
- Dimitrios Gatsios – drums (2022–present)

=== Former ===
- Niki Weltz – drums (1994–1997)
- Manuel Vinke – lead guitar (1996–1997)
- Andreas Litschel – keyboards (1996–1997)
- Holger Vester – bass (1996–1997)
- Nicole Tobien – vocals (1997)
- Holger Vester – bass (1997)
- Jens Becker – lead guitar (1999–2000)
- Andreas Maske – lead guitar (2000–2001)
- Roland Krueger – bass (1999–2004)
- Kerstin Bischof – vocals (2009–2010)
- Lisa Middelhauve – vocals, piano (2000–2008, 2010)
- Nils Middelhauve – bass (2004–2012)
- Manuela Kraller – vocals (2010–2013)
- Dianne van Giersbergen – vocals (2013–2017)
- Steven Wussow – bass (2013–2019)
- Gerit Lamm – drums (2000–2022)
- Philip Restemeier – lead guitar (2002–2022)
- Tim Schwarz – bass (2022–2026)

=== Live ===
- Fabio D'Amore – bass (2012–2014)
- Hendrik Thiesbrummel – drums (2016)
- Aeva Maurelle – vocals (2017–2019)

== Discography ==
=== Studio albums ===
Year	Title	Peak positions		
Year	Title	GER	AUT	SWI
2003	Kill the Sun	98	—	—
2004	Ravenheart	36	—	—
2005	India	30	—	—
2007	Salomé – The Seventh Veil	49	—	—
2012	Neverworld's End	43	—	51
2014	Sacrificium	25	71	48
2017	Theater of Dimensions	17	56	25
2023	The Wonders Still Awaiting	9	—	11
2026	Eclipse	11	35	18

=== Compilation albums ===
Year	Title
2008	Now & Forever – Best of Xandria

=== EPs ===
Year	Title
2015	Fire & Ashes
2024	Universal Tales

=== Singles ===
Year	Title	Peak positions	Album
Year	Title	GER	Album
2004	"Ravenheart"	—	Ravenheart
2004	"Eversleeping"	86^{1}	Ravenheart
2007	"Save My Life"	—	Salomé – The Seventh Veil

^{1} Limited edition

==== Promo singles ====
Year	Title	Album
2003	"Kill the Sun"	Kill the Sun
2005	"In Love with the Darkness"	India
2007	"Sisters of the Light"^{1}	Salomé – The Seventh Veil
2012	"Valentine"	Neverworld's End
2014	"Dreamkeeper"	Sacrificium
2014	"Nightfall"	Sacrificium
2015	"Don't Say a Word"	Fire & Ashes
2015	"Voyage of the Fallen"	Fire & Ashes
2017	"We Are Murderers (We All)"	Theater of Dimensions
2017	"Call of Destiny"	Theater of Dimensions
2017	"Queen of Hearts Reborn"	Theater of Dimensions
2017	"Ship of Doom"	Theater of Dimensions
2022	"Reborn"	The Wonders Still Awaiting
2022	"You Will Never Be Our God"	The Wonders Still Awaiting
2022	"Ghosts"	The Wonders Still Awaiting
2022	"The Wonders Still Awaiting"	The Wonders Still Awaiting
2023	"Two Worlds"	The Wonders Still Awaiting
2023	"My Curse is My Redemption"	The Wonders Still Awaiting
2024	"Universal"	Universal Tales
2024	"No Time to Live Forever"	Universal Tales
2024	"200 Years"	Universal Tales
2026	"The Shannon's Home"	Eclipse

^{1} As Xandria vs. Jesus on Extasy
