= India (Xandria album) =

Studio album by Xandria
- Released: August 22, 2005
- Recorded: December 2004 – June 2005
- Studio: Pleasurepark Studios, Belgium
- Genre: Symphonic metal, gothic metal
- Length: 51:58
- Label: Drakkar Entertainment
- Producer: José Alvarez-Brill

Xandria chronology
Ravenheart (2004)	India (2005)	Salomé – The Seventh Veil (2007)

Singles from India
- 1. "In Love with the Darkness" Released: 2005

India is the third album by German symphonic metal band Xandria. It was released on August 22, 2005, via Drakkar Entertainment label. The album also released one single, "In Love with the Darkness".

In comparison with its predecessor Ravenheart, the album presents a larger variety of musical ideas and a more powerful and dynamic sound, a clear progression for the band. The album features the Deutsches Filmorchester Babelsberg and several guest musicians: the Irish folk band Sceal Eile, musicians and the female singer of the band Lyriel and the Australian Grant Stevens.

The producer José Alvarez-Brill is the same of Ravenheart. The recordings took place with some interruptions used for further song writing and arranging from December 2004 to June 2005. The album was released on August 22, 2005, and reached number 30 in the German album charts.

== Track listing ==
No.	Title	Lyrics	Music	Length
1.	"India"	Marco Heubaum	Heubaum	5:17
2.	"Now & Forever"	Heubaum	Heubaum	3:20
3.	"In Love with the Darkness"	Lisa Middelhauve, Nils Middelhauve	L. Middelhauve, Heubaum, N. Middelhauve	3:49
4.	"Fight Me"	Heubaum	Heubaum	3:37
5.	"Black and Silver"	L. Middelhauve, N. Middelhauve	L. Middelhauve, Heubaum	3:56
6.	"Like a Rose on the Grave of Love"	L. Middelhauve	L. Middelhauve	4:25
7.	"Widescreen"	N. Middelhauve	Heubaum	4:15
8.	"The End of Every Story"	Heubaum	Heubaum, Philip Restemeier	4:54
9.	"Who We Are (And Who We Want to Be)"	L. Middelhauve	L. Middelhauve	4:17
10.	"Dancer"	Heubaum	Heubaum	3:50
11.	"Winterhearted"	L. Middelhauve, N. Middelhauve	L. Middelhauve, Heubaum, Restemeier	4:18
12.	"Return to India"	N. Middelhauve	N. Middelhauve	6:00
Total length:				51:58

Bonus track
No.	Title	Length
13.	"Lullaby"	2:43
Total length:		54:41

== Personnel ==
All information from the album booklet.

Xandria

- Lisa Middelhauve – lead vocals
- Marco Heubaum – guitars, keyboards, programming
- Philip Restemeier – guitars, backing vocals
- Nils Middelhauve – bass
- Gerit Lamm – drums

Additional musicians

- Deutsches Filmorchester Babelsberg – orchestra
- Bernd Wefelmeyer – orchestra conductor
- Jessica Thierjung (Lyriel) – vocals on "Like a Rose on the Grave of Love", choir vocals
- Grant Stevens – spoken words and additional vocals on "India", choir vocals
- Linda Laukamp (Lyriel) – solo cello on "The End of Every Story" and "Winterhearted", choir vocals
- Oliver Thierjung – choir vocals
- Gert Neumann (Sceal Eile) – guitar and mandolin on "Like a Rose on the Grave of Love"
- Jens Barabasch (Sceal Eile) – whistles and gaita on "Like a Rose on the Grave of Love"
- Johannes Schiefner (Sceal Eile) – uilleann pipes and keyboards on "Like a Rose on the Grave of Love"
- Stefan Lammert (Sceal Eile) – percussion on "Like a Rose on the Grave of Love"
- Volker Kamp (Sceal Eile) – kontrabass on "Like a Rose on the Grave of Love"
- Nicolas Nohn – orchestration

Production

- José Alvarez-Brill – producer, recording, mixing
- Thomas Gwosdz – recording
- Eroc – mastering
- Kai Hoffmann – artwork
- Dirk Schelpmeier – photography
