= Re-Evolution (album) =

Studio album of re-recorded songs by Amberian Dawn
- Released: 14 June 2013 (Finland); 17 June 2013 (Europe, USA, Japan, Asia & Australia)
- Recorded: 2013
- Genre: Symphonic power metal
- Length: 42:49
- Label: KHY Suomen Musiikki
- Producer: Tuomas Seppälä

Amberian Dawn chronology
Circus Black (2012)	Re-Evolution (2013)	Magic Forest (2014)

Singles from Re-Evolution
- 1. "Kokko - Eagle of Fire" Released: 17 May 2013

Re-Evolution is the fifth studio album by Finnish symphonic metal band Amberian Dawn. This album contains re-recorded songs from their past four albums; River of Tuoni (2008), The Clouds of Northland Thunder (2009), End of Eden (2010), and Circus Black (2012), each of the tracks remastered with lyrics performed by the band's new vocalist, Päivi "Capri" Virkkunen.

== Background ==
After the band parted ways with Parviainen in November, the band decided to find a new vocalist. They announced in December 2012 that their new vocalist would be Capri Virkkunen, a Finnish singer with 2 solo albums released to her name. Capri performs her vocals in a more traditional rock fashion, despite the fact that she is classically trained. To introduce the new vocalist, the band decided to release a compilation album of old songs but with the vocals re-recorded by Capri.

Before the album's release, "Kokko - Eagle of Fire" was released as a single in May 2013, which was preceded by an official music video for the same song in April on the band's official YouTube channel.

== Cover art ==
On the cover art of the album is a throw-back to the band's previous releases, as under the store banner that reads: "MEDIA - The best rates in town" on the right of the cover, there is a door with the band's logo, and the window of the store contains cover art from the previous four albums.

== Track listing ==
All Music by Tuomas Seppälä all lyrics by Heidi Parviainen

No.	Title	Notes	Length
1.	"Valkyries"	(Originally from River of Tuoni)	3:28
2.	"Incubus"	(Originally from The Clouds of Northland Thunder)	5:03
3.	"Kokko - Eagle of Fire"	(Originally from The Clouds of Northland Thunder)	3:18
4.	"Lily of the Moon"	(Originally from Circus Black)	4:08
5.	"Come Now Follow"	(Originally from End of Eden)	3:47
6.	"Crimson Flower"	(Originally from Circus Black)	4:23
7.	"Circus Black"	(Originally from Circus Black)	3:48
8.	"Lost Soul"	(Originally from The Clouds of Northland Thunder)	3:41
9.	"Cold Kiss (feat. Timo Kotipelto)"	(Originally from Circus Black)	3:29
10.	"River of Tuoni"	(Originally from River of Tuoni)	2:59
11.	"Charnel's Ball"	(Originally from Circus Black)	4:30

== Personnel ==
=== Band members ===
- Päivi "Capri" Virkkunen – vocals
- Tuomas Seppälä – keyboards, guitar, bass guitar on "Valkyries", "Incubus", "Kokko - Eagle of Fire", "Come Now Follow", "Lost Soul" and "River of Tuoni"
- Joonas Pykälä-aho – drums
- Emil "Emppu" Pohjalainen – guitars
- Kimmo Korhonen – guitars

=== Guest/session musicians ===
- Peter James Goodman - vocals on "Incubus"
- Timo Kotipelto - vocals on "Cold Kiss"
- Heikki Saari - drums on tracks "Lily of the Moon", "Crimson Flower", "Circus Black", "Cold Kiss", "River of Tuoni" and "Charnel's Ball"
- Jukka Koskinen - bass guitar on tracks "Lily of the Moon", "Crimson Flower", "Circus Black", "Cold Kiss" and "Charnel's Ball"
