= Villieläin =

Finnish symphonic/power metal band

- Origin: Tampere, Finland
- Genre: Symphonic / Power metal
- Years active: 2006-2011 (Indefinite hiatus)
- Label: Universal Music Group
- Members: Emilia Rantasalo; Jani Hölli; Timo Niemistö; Dimitri Martinov; Mikael Hakamies
- Past members: Janne Juutinen

Villieläin are a symphonic / power metal band from Tampere, Finland. They formed in 2006 and released a demo the same year. On August 19, 2009 they released their first studio album named Julma Satu, and went on indefinite hiatus soon afterwards.

== Background ==
The band was formed in 2006 by Emilia "Nemilia" Rantasalo, Jani Hölli, Timo Niemistö, Janne Juutinen and Dimitri Martinov, with the name of the band meaning Wild Animal. The group's lyrics centered around the idea of ”He who makes a beast of himself, gets rid of the pain of being a man”. Their music was inspired by the original gloomy fairy tales of the Brothers Grimm and their lyrics also contained references to these stories. They incorporated female coloratura vocals, heavy metal riffs and industrial sounding keyboards into their songs. They toured regularly but were not signed to a record label until 2008, when they were signed to Universal Music. Another change was made in 2008. Janne Juutinen was replaced by Mikael Hakamies as the band's drummer.

Their first single "Kaiverrettu Hiekkaan" ("Engraved in Sand") was widely played on Finnish mainstream radio stations and was a download only release. It featured on the Soundi 2009 compilation album. Their second single, "Voittamaton" ("Invincible") was released on May 12, 2009 and entered the Finnish top 20 singles charts at position 12, on the week beginning at August 2, 2009. The third single "Kuoleman Suudelma" ("Kiss of Death"), was released in August 2009.

=== Julma Satu ===
The band's debut album, Julma Satu (Cruel Fairytale) was a mixture of heavy power metal, industrial sounds and acoustic influences. It was released on August 19, 2009 and reached #27 on the Finnish top 40 album charts, where it stayed for one week. Many Finnish musicians were involved in the songwriting and production of the album, including Manzana vocalist Piritta "Lumous" Vartola, Entwine drummer Aksu Hanttu and former Soulrelic vocalist Raymond Pohjola.

The album's booklet details the fairytale story of the characters as portrayed by the members, saying that they were a group of "outcasts, gathered together by a mystic shaman in order to avenge the evils done to them by humanity" and tells of a world where people live in past emotions, leaving the world with no future and a feeling of time standing still.

=== Reception ===
Reception to the album was mixed to negative, with the group being criticized for "creating music that does not take itself seriously", sounding like "a cheap Nightwish copy and "a low cost version of Spinal Tap". Petri Klemetti remarked that "although putting fairy tale style lyrics to the sounds of metal is an original idea, it doesn't work because the music is too terrifying for children, but yet too childish for adults and therefore does not appeal to any specific target audience". The overall mixing of the album has been criticized as being "bland, dull, tasteless and colourless", although Aksu Hanttu has been commended for his involvement. However others are of the view that the overall production of the album is "a fresh extract of sounds previously demonstrated by Poisonblack" and an example of "fantastic modern heavy rock". Since 2013, however the band are steadily gaining popularity and exposure through social media and music discussion sites such as Last.fm.

=== Eurovision 2010 ===
Villieläin was one of the 30 entries taking part in SMS voting, which ran from 1st till 15 October 2009. Only three performers proceeded to the live selection phase. The band were entry 30 and entered the song "Ei Minua" ("Not Me") for selection as a song choice for Finland in the 2010 Eurovision Song Contest, held in Oslo, Norway. The song received a large number of votes and thus finished in the top 10 of the web voting. However, since it did not finish in the top three, the band were eliminated from the competition.

=== Indefinite Hiatus (2011-present) ===
In October 2009, the band’s official website was suddenly taken down, and the group's Metal Archives page listed them as having split-up.

In 2013, Nemilia gave an interview where she said that the group had "taken a break" and were working on their own projects, as they were disheartened with how low the album sales were (and also due to financial difficulties). Holli now plays keyboards for several other groups, Niemistö is now playing guitar in the progressive metal group Anthriel, and Martinov and Hakamies are working on private projects. Nemilia runs the company "Altissimo", where she offers vocal performances at various events. She also performs concerts with pianist Matthew Carter, and is taking singing lessons with opera singer and professor Seppo Ruohonen. When asked if there was any chance of the band reuniting, Rantasalo replied that there could be a possibility, but there were no plans for the foreseeable future.

As of 2014 Dimmu is playing bass in a Melodic Hard Rock band called Randy Royal Machine., Tinke is recording a new album with Anthriel and is in a band with Teräsbetoni vocalist Jarkko Ahola called Cosmic Spell. Jani Hölli plays keyboards in the rock group Waltari.

It was speculated that Nemilia would be the new vocalist for symphonic metal group Amberian Dawn, but Capri Virkkunen was chosen instead.

== Members ==
=== Last Known Line-up ===
- Emilia "Nemilia" Rantasalo - vocals (Mystic Opera)
- Jani "Jay" Hölli - keyboards, (Snakegod, Soulrelic, Technical Justice)
- Timo "Tinke" Niemistö - guitar (Anthriel, Soulrelic, X-Tacy, Elias Viljanen)
- Dimitri "Dimmu" Martinov - bass (Two Witches)
- Mikael "Miguel" Hakamies - drums (Snakegod)

=== Former members ===
- Janne Juutinen (2006–2008), (Dreamtale, Masterstroke, ex-Crystallic) - drums

=== Guest musicians ===
- Capri Virkkunen (Amberian Dawn) - backing vocals
- Aksu Hanttu (Entwine) - backing vocals
- Jaakko Teittinen - growls on Voittamaton
- Mika Tauriainen (Entwine, ShamRain) - male vocals on Kuoleman Suudelma
- Janne Juutinen (Masterstroke) - drums
- Petri Alanko - flute

=== Songwriters and collaborators ===
- Piritta "Lumous" Vartola (Manzana)
- Aksu Hanttu (Entwine)
- Tommy Suomala (Soulrelic)
- Raymond Pohjola (Soulrelic)
- Anna-Eerika Guzejev (Dean)
- Petri Alanko

== Discography ==
=== Studio albums ===
- Julma Satu (Cruel Fairytale) (2009)

=== Demos and singles ===
- "Demo" (2006)
- "Kaiverrettu Hiekkaan" ("Engraved in Sand") (2008) - single
- "Voittamaton" ("Invincible") (2009) - single
- "Kuoleman Suudelma" ("Kiss of Death") (2009) - single
- "Ei Minua" ("Not Me") (2009) - unreleased commercially
