= Harmaja (disambiguation) =

Harmaja is an island and a lighthouse outside Helsinki, Finland.

Harmaja may also refer to:

- Harmaja (band), Finnish acoustic rock group
- Harmaja (album), a self-titled album by the Finnish acoustic rock group Harmaja
- Leo Harmaja (1880–1949), Finnish economist and Director General of the National Archives Service of Finland
- Saima Harmaja (1913–1937), Finnish poet and writer
- Tapani Harmaja (1917–1940), Finnish World War II pilot and writer
- Harri Harmaja (1944–), Finnish biologist and mycologist at the University of Helsinki.
