= The Puzzle (album) =

Studio album by Dark Sarah
- Released: 17 November 2016
- Recorded: 2015–2016
- Genre: Symphonic metal
- Length: 48:10
- Label: Inner Wound Recordings
- Producer: Mikko P. Mustonen

Dark Sarah chronology
Behind the Black Veil (2015)	The Puzzle (2016)	The Golden Moth (2018)

Singles from The Puzzle
- 1. "Little Men" Released: 15 April 2016; 2. "Aquarium" Released: 18 October 2016; 3. "Dance with the Dragon" Released: 16 November 2016

Professional ratings
Review scores
Source	Rating
Stormbringer	4/5

The Puzzle is the second studio album by symphonic metal band Dark Sarah. It is a concept album continuing the storyline that started with their debut Behind the Black Veil.

== Background and promotion ==
The first video for the song of the album "Little Men" was released on 15 April 2016. On 24 April Parviainen revealed on her Facebook page that once again three guests would perform on the new album. Manuela Kraller returns as her character Fate on the song "Rain", and Juha-Pekka Leppäluoto (Charon, Northern Kings) plays the character The Dragon on the song "Dance with the Dragon". On 13 September the third guest was announced, Charlotte Wessels (Delain, Phantasma) plays the character Evil Siren Mermaid on the song "Aquarium", along with the information that The Puzzle would have been released in Europe and North America on 18 November. On 18 October a lyric video from the song "Aquarium" was released.

== Track listing ==
All lyrics are written by Heidi Parviainen; all music is composed by Mikko P. Mustonen except where noted.

No.	Title	Music	Length
1.	"Breath"		2:00
2.	"Island in the Mist"		4:42
3.	"Little Men"		4:50
4.	"Ash Grove"		4:12
5.	"For the Birds"	Heidi Parviainen, Mikko P. Mustonen	4:35
6.	"Deep and Deeper"		4:45
7.	"Dance with the Dragon" (featuring Juha-Pekka Leppäluoto)	Heidi Parviainen, Mikko P. Mustonen	5:24
8.	"Cliffhanger"	Heidi Parviainen, Mikko P. Mustonen	5:58
9.	"Aquarium" (featuring Charlotte Wessels)		4:50
10.	"Rain" (featuring Manuela Kraller)	Heidi Parviainen, Mikko P. Mustonen	6:54

== Personnel ==
=== Dark Sarah ===
- Heidi Parviainen – vocals, flute on track 5
- Erkka Korhonen – guitar
- Rude Rothstén – bass
- Thomas Tunkkari – drums

=== Guests ===
- Juha-Pekka Leppäluoto – vocals on track 7
- Charlotte Wessels – vocals on track 9
- Manuela Kraller – vocals on track 10

=== Production ===
- Mikko P. Mustonen – producer, mixing, orchestrations
- Svante Forsbäck – mastering
- Jan Yrlund – cover artwork
