= The Golden Moth =

Studio album by Dark Sarah
- Released: 21 September 2018
- Recorded: 2017–2018
- Genre: Symphonic metal
- Length: 57:35
- Label: Inner Wound Recordings
- Producer: Mikko P. Mustonen

Dark Sarah chronology
The Puzzle (2016)	The Golden Moth (2018)	Grim (2020)

Singles from The Golden Moth
- 1. "Trespasser" Released: 28 October 2017; 2. "The Gods Speak" Released: 28 August 2018

Professional ratings
Review scores
Source	Rating
Dead Rhetoric	7.5/10
Stormbringer	5/5

The Golden Moth is the third studio album by symphonic metal band Dark Sarah. It is a concept album that conludes the first Dark Sarah trilogy, "The Chronicles". It is also the only album in which guest vocalist Juha-Pekka Leppäluoto was a full-time member.

== Track listing ==
All lyrics are written by Heidi Parviainen; all music is composed by Heidi Parviainen and Mikko P. Mustonen except where noted.

No.	Title	Music	Length
1.	"Desert Rose"	Heidi Parviainen, Mikko P. Mustonen, Juha-Pekka Leppäluoto	1:29
2.	"Trespasser"		4:42
3.	"Wheel"		4:50
4.	"My Beautiful Enemy"		5:38
5.	"I Once Had Wings"	Mikko P. Mustonen	6:04
6.	"Pirates"		5:35
7.	"Sky Sailing"	Heidi Parviainen, Mikko P. Mustonen, Juha-Pekka Leppäluoto	5:35
8.	"Wish"		4:23
9.	"Gods Speak" (feat. Zuberoa Aznárez and Marko Hietala)		6:24
10.	"Promise"		5:18
11.	"The Golden Moth"		5:23
12.	"The Gate of Time"	Mikko P. Mustonen	2:16

== Personnel ==
=== Dark Sarah ===
- Heidi Parviainen – vocals
- Juha-Pekka Leppäluoto – vocals
- Erkka Korhonen – guitar
- Rude Rothstén – bass, choir vocals on track 6
- Thomas Tunkkari – drums, choir vocals on track 6

=== Guests ===
- Netta Skog – accordion on track 6
- Sami Salonen – choir vocals on track 6
- Zuberoa Aznárez (Diabulus in Musica) – vocals on track 9
- Marko Hietala – vocals on track 9

=== Production ===
- Mikko P. Mustonen – producer, mixing, orchestrations
- Henkka Niemistö – mastering
- Toni Härkönen – photography
- Jan Yrlund – cover artwork
