= Magic Forest (disambiguation) =

Magic Forest is a common name for Lake George Expedition Park in New York.

Magic Forest may also refer to:

- Magic Forest (album), a 2014 album by Amberian Dawn
- "Magic Forest", a song by Fat Mattress from their 1969 self-titled debut album

== See also ==
- Enchanted forest
