= Dark Sarah =

Finnish symphonic metal band

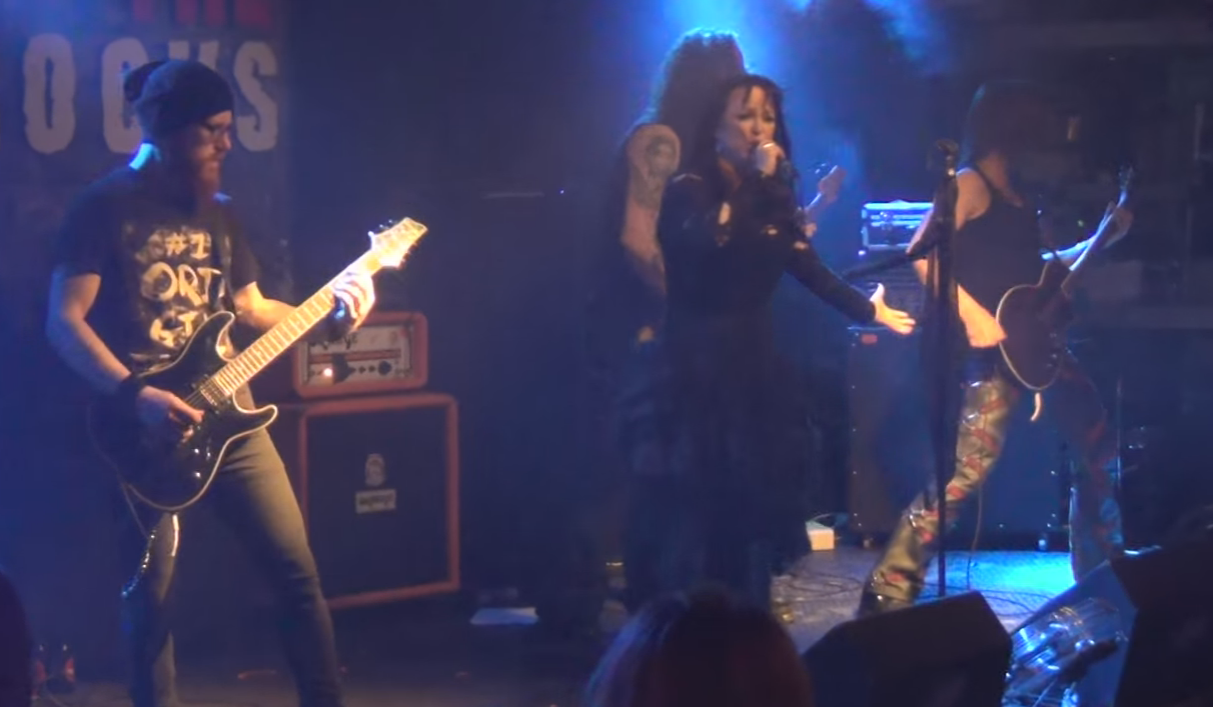

Background information
- Origin: Kerava, Finland
- Genre: Symphonic metal
- Years active: 2012–present
- Label: Napalm Records
- Members: Heidi Parviainen; Sami Salonen; Rude Rothstén; Thomas Tunkkari
- Past members: Jukka Koskinen; Lauri Kuussalo; JP Leppäluoto; Erkka Korhonen; Henrik Airaksinen
- Website: darksarah.com

Dark Sarah is a Finnish symphonic metal band formed by Heidi Parviainen after her departure from Amberian Dawn in 2012. Their style has been described as "cinematic metal".

== History ==
=== Formation and Behind the Black Veil (2012–2015) ===
Vocalist Heidi Parviainen started working on Dark Sarah's debut album Behind the Black Veil after having made the decision to leave her former band Amberian Dawn. When writing her first lyrics for the song "Save Me", which is about a character named Sarah, who is left at the altar by her fiancé, and runs off into the woods in tears, she eventually decided to make a concept album which would be about the dark side of Sarah. It was also then that she came up with the name of her project. To bring her project to the attention of audience, she asked musicians Kasperi Heikkinen, Teemu Laitinen and Jukka Koskinen to record the first two songs "Save Me" and "Poison Apple" for what would turn out into Dark Sarah's debut album Behind the Black Veil.

To finance the whole project, three separate Indiegogo campaigns were started, which all received full funding by the fans. The cd would be recorded into three parts, called episodes, the first episode containing the first four tracks, the second tracks 5 to 8, and the third tracks 9 to 14. For promotional purposes the EP Violent Roses, which contained episodes 1 and 2, went on sale during Metal Female Voices Fest 2014. Only 250 copies were pressed, and all were signed by the then live line up.

In the meantime the rest of the recordings for Behind the Black Veil continued. On 27 September 2012 it was announced that Manuela Kraller (ex-Xandria) would participate in a duet for the song "Memories Fall", as the Fate character. Two more collaborations were announced later on as well, on 13 January 2013 that of Inga Scharf (character Queen of No Good) and Stefan Schmidt from German metal band Van Canto for the song "Evil Roots", and on 29 August 2014 that of Tony Kakko (character The Moon) from Finnish metal band Sonata Arctica for the song "Light in You". Parviainen completed the lyrics with the help of Emy Frost, Janne Storm and Perttu Vänskä, and the music with Frost, Storm, Mikko P. Mustonen and Stefan Schmidt. Guitarists Sami Salonen and Erkka Korhonen, drummer Lauri Kuussalo and bass player Jukka Koskinen were added to the official line up of Dark Sarah, which now had turned into a live band, with Parviainen remaining the main figure. On the way, bass player Jukka Koskinen left, and was replaced by Rude Rothstén, and drummer Lauri Kussaloit left as well, and was replaced by Thomas Tunkkari. Video's for the songs "Memories Fall" (feat. Manuela Kraller), "Hunting the Dreamer" and "Light in You" (feat. Tony Kakko) were released.

=== The Puzzle (2015–2017) ===
On 16 December 2015 Parviainen announced through her Facebook page that recordings for the first songs of the next album had started. On 6 March 2016 the first teaser was released together with the title of the new album, which would be named The Puzzle. The story of the album is going to continue from where it ended on the previous album. Parviainen explains it as: "The Puzzle is a concept album and it continues the story that started on the debut album called Behind the Black Veil. After the evil tree had died and Dark Sarah's soul with it, she was sent to drift along the river of death. The streams took her on an island where the banished souls are taken to. To get off the island she needs to solve the puzzle and find three keys."

Heidi Parviainen and Juha-Pekka Leppäluoto singing live as the characters "Dark Sarah" and "The Dragon" at a concert in November 2017

Once again an indiegogo campaign started to finance the album, this time without several episodes. Full funding was reached at the end of the campaign. The first video for the song of the album "Little Men" was released on 15 April 2016. On 24 April Parviainen revealed on her Facebook page that once again three guests would perform on the new album. Manuela Kraller returns as her character Fate on the song "Rain", and Juha-Pekka Leppäluoto (Charon, Northern Kings) plays the character The Dragon on the song "Dance with the Dragon". On 13 September the third guest was announced, Charlotte Wessels (Delain, Phantasma) plays the character Evil Siren Mermaid on the song "Aquarium", along with the information that The Puzzle would have been released in Europe and North America on 18 November. On 18 October a lyric video from the song "Aquarium" was released.

=== The Golden Moth (2017–2019) ===
In March 2017, it was announced that a third album was in the works, with JP Leppäluoto returning to reprise his role as The Dragon, as well as join the band lineup and compose music for the album together with Parviainen. Another crowdfunding campaign to raise money for a new music video was also announced. The description on the crowdfunding page read; "The concept of Dark Sarah is built around a story that tells about a young woman called Sarah and her fight against her evil side persona Dark Sarah. The albums tell a story about her journey through three worlds - The Middle World, the world of living (Behind The Black Veil album) and The Under World, where the dead dwell (The Puzzle album) and The Upper World, where spirits and gods reside." The new album was also described as a continuation of the story of Dark Sarah and The Dragon (the ruler of the Underworld), who meet again in The Upper World. On 26 October the next Indiegogo campaign started, which reached full funds on 14 December. Along with it came the title of the new album, The Golden Moth, and a new music video for the song "Trespasser". On 2 November, singer Zuberoa Aznárez from Spanish metal band Diabulus in Musica was revealed as the first new guest on the album as the fierce goddess Iron Mask on Dark Sarah's Facebook page. Later on 3 December the other two guests were revealed, singer and bassplayer Marko Hietala from Finnish metal band Nightwish as the god White Beard and accordion player Netta Skog from the Finnish metal band Ensiferum as an accordion playing Fortune Teller.

=== Grim (2020) ===
The album started a new story line with a new protagonist called Luna. Luna is a new incarnation of Dark Sarah, a witch who tries to save the city of Grim from the monster Mörk (Jasse Jatala) and evil orb Malevolent. JP Leppäluoto left the band but featured on the album as Wolf. Album was released by Napalm Records.

=== Attack Of Orym (2023) ===
Dark Sarah announced the departure of Erkka Korhonen and invited a keyboardist Henrik Airaksinen (Feridea) to replace him. The new album Attack of Orym was again crowdfunded on Indie Gogo and released in January 27th 2023. It continues the new storyline which started on Grim-album. Featuring singers were announced Mark Jansen(EPICA) as Orym and JP Leppäluoto as Wolf/Dragon. Dark Sarah toured in Europe with Sirenia and Amberian Dawn in Fall 2023.

=== Upcoming sixth album ===
Dark Sarah began working on their sixth album as of November 2024, even if keyboardist Henrik Airaksinen decided to leave the band in summer 2024 to concentrate on his own project. He was replaced by Sebastian Lindström in April 2025.

== Band members ==
=== Current ===
- Heidi Parviainen — vocals (2012–present)
- Sami Salonen — guitars (2019–present; touring member 2014–2019)
- Thomas Tunkkari — drums and percussion (2015–present)
- Rude Rothstén — bass (2014–present)
- Sebastian Lindström — synth and keys (2025-present)

=== Former ===
- Jukka Koskinen — bass (2014)
- Lauri Kuussalo — drums (2014–2015)
- Juha-Pekka Leppäluoto — vocals (2017–2019)
- Erkka Korhonen — guitars (2014–2021)
- Henrik Airaksinen - synth & keys (2022-2024)

=== Session ===
Behind the Black Veil:

- Kasperi Heikkinen (guitars on "Save Me" and "Poison Apple")
- Manuela Kraller (as the character Fate on "Memories Fall")
- Inga Scharf (as the character Queen of No Good on "Evil Roots")
- Van Canto (backing vocals on "Evil Roots")
- Tuomas Nieminen (backing vocals on "Silver Tree" and "Light in You")
- Tony Kakko (as the character The Moon on "Light in You")

The Puzzle:

- Juha-Pekka Leppäluoto (as the character The Dragon on "Dance with the Dragon")
- Charlotte Wessels (as the character Evil Siren Mermaid on "Aquarium")
- Manuela Kraller (as the character Fate on "Rain")

The Golden Moth:

- Zuberoa Aznárez (as the character Iron Mask)
- Marko Hietala (as the character White Beard)
- Netta Skog (as the character Fortune Teller)
- Juha-Pekka Leppäluoto (as the character The Dragon)

Grim:

- Juha-Pekka Leppäluoto (as the character The Dragon/Garmr the Wolf)
- Jasse Jatala (as the character Mörk)

Attack Of Orym:

- Mark Jansen (as the character Orym)
- Juha-Pekka Leppäluoto (as the character The Dragon/Garmr the Wolf)

== Discography ==
Studio albums

- Behind the Black Veil (2015)
- The Puzzle (2016)
- The Golden Moth (2018)
- Grim (2020)
- Attack of Orym (2023)

EPs

- Violent Roses (2014)

Music videos

- "Save Me" (2013)
- "Memories Fall" (2014)
- "Hunting the Dreamer" (2014)
- "Light in You" (2015)
- "Little Men" (2016)
- "Aquarium" (lyric video) (2016)
- "Dance with the Dragon" (2016)
- "Trespasser" (2017)
- "Gods Speak" (lyric video) (2018)
- "Sky Sailing" (2018)
- "Golden Moth" (2018)
- "Melancholia" (2020)
- "All Ears!" (2020)
- "Illuminate" (2020)
- "B.U.R.N" (2023)
- "Warning Sign" (2023)
- "Invincible" (lyric video)(2023)
