= Attack of Orym =

Studio album by Dark Sarah
- Released: 27 January 2023
- Recorded: 2021–2022
- Genre: Symphonic metal
- Length: 44:27
- Producer: Mikko P. Mustonen

Dark Sarah chronology
Grim (2020)	Attack of Orym (2023)

Professional ratings
Review scores
Source	Rating
Chaoszine	4.5/5
Flyctory	4.2/5
Metal Express Radio	2/10

Attack of Orym is the fifth studio album by symphonic metal band Dark Sarah, released on 27 January 2023 and crowdfunded on Indiegogo. It is a concept album that continues the storyline that started with their previous album Grim.

== Track listing ==
All tracks are written by Heidi Parviainen and Mikko P. Mustonen.

No.	Title	Length
1.	"Intro - Choose Your Weapons"	1:09
2.	"Attack of Orym"	5:28
3.	"Invincible"	4:04
4.	"B.U.R.N"	5:05
5.	"Warning Sign"	4:19
6.	"Goth Disco"	4:47
7.	"Delirium"	4:50
8.	"Piece of My Heart"	4:57
9.	"Breaking Free"	5:23
10.	"Hero and a Villain"	4:25

== Personnel ==
=== Dark Sarah ===
- Heidi Parviainen – vocals
- Sami Salonen – guitar
- Rude Rothstén – bass
- Henrik Airaksinen – keyboards
- Thomas Tunkkari – drums

=== Guests ===
- Mark Jansen – vocals on track 2
- Kasperi Heikkinen – guitar on track 3 and 7
- Juha-Pekka Leppäluoto – vocals on track 8

=== Production ===
- Mikko P. Mustonen – producer, mixing, orchestrations, editing
- Svante Forsbäck – mastering
- Marko Simonen – photography
- Warm_Tail – cover artwork
