= Grim (Dark Sarah album) =

Studio album by Dark Sarah
- Released: 17 July 2020
- Recorded: 2019–2020
- Genre: Symphonic metal
- Length: 55:36
- Label: Napalm Records
- Producer: Mikko P. Mustonen

Dark Sarah chronology
The Golden Moth (2018)	Grim (2020)	Attack of Orym (2023)

Singles from Grim
- 1. "All Ears!" Released: 21 May 2020; 2. "Illuminate" Released: 1 July 2020; 3. "Melancholia" Released: 22 January 2021

Professional ratings
Review scores
Source	Rating
Dead Rhetoric	8/10
Sonic Perspectives	8.4/10
Stormbringer	3/5

Grim is the fourth studio album by symphonic metal band Dark Sarah, released on 17 July 2020 via Napalm Records. Grim is a concept album that starts a new storyline while linked to the Dark Sarah trilogy that has spanned the band's first three albums. The story is centered around Luna, "the new incarnation of Dark Sarah", and the antagonist Mörk the Monster. Vocalist Heidi Parviainen stated that she was already writing the new story during the writing process of The Golden Moth.

== Track listing ==
All lyrics are written by Heidi Parviainen except where noted; all music is composed by Heidi Parviainen and Mikko P. Mustonen except where noted.

No.	Title	Lyrics	Music	Length
1.	"My Name Is Luna"		Heidi Parviainen	1:53
2.	"The Chosen One"			5:22
3.	"Illuminate"			4:09
4.	"Melancholia"	Heidi Parviainen, Mikko P. Mustonen		6:28
5.	"Iceheart"		Heidi Parviainen	3:04
6.	"La folie verte"			5:05
7.	"The Wolf and the Maiden"		Heidi Parviainen	4:12
8.	"The Hex"			4:12
9.	"All Ears!"			4:14
10.	"The Devil's Peak"			5:18
11.	"Mörk"		Mikko P. Mustonen	7:23
12.	"The Dark Throne"			4:16

== Personnel ==
=== Dark Sarah ===
- Heidi Parviainen – vocals as Luna
- Sami Salonen – guitar
- Erkka Korhonen – guitar
- Rude Rothstén – bass
- Thomas Tunkkari – drums

=== Guests ===
- Jasse Jatala – vocals as Mörk
- Juha-Pekka Leppäluoto – vocals as Wolf

=== Production ===
- Mikko P. Mustonen – producer, mixing, orchestrations, arrangements, engineering
- Henkka Niemistö – mastering
- Marko Simonen – photography
- Jan Yrlund – cover artwork
