= Behind the Black Veil =

Behind The Black Veil

Studio album by Dark Sarah
- Released: 25 May 2015
- Recorded: 2013–2014
- Genre: Symphonic metal
- Length: 62:16
- Label: Inner Wound Recordings
- Producer: Mikko P. Mustonen

Dark Sarah chronology
Violent Roses (EP) (2014)	Behind The Black Veil (2015)	The Puzzle (2016)

Singles from Behind The Black Veil
- 1. "Save Me" Released: 8 March 2013; 2. "Memories Fall" Released: 12 January 2014; 3. "Hunting The Dreamer" Released: 6 October 2014; 4. "Light in You" Released: January 2 2015; 5. "Evil Roots" Released: April 15 2015

Professional ratings
Review scores
Source	Rating
Dead Rhetoric	6.5/10
Metal.de	8/10
Sonic Cathedral	9/10
Stormbringer	3.5/5

Behind the Black Veil is the debut studio album by symphonic metal band Dark Sarah. It is Heidi Parviainen's first album since her departure from Amberian Dawn, and marks the beginning of a conceptual saga.

== Background and promotion ==
Heidi Parviainen started working on Behind the Black Veil after having made the decision to leave her former band Amberian Dawn. When writing her first lyrics for the song "Save Me", which is about a character named Sarah, who is left at the altar by her fiancé, and runs off into the woods in tears, she eventually decided to make a concept album which would be about the dark side of Sarah. It was also then that she came up with the name of her project. To bring her project to the attention of audience, she asked musicians Kasperi Heikkinen, Teemu Laitinen and Jukka Koskinen to record the first two songs "Save Me" and "Poison Apple" for what would turn out into Dark Sarah's debut album Behind the Black Veil.

To finance the whole project, three separate Indiegogo campaigns were started, which all received full funding by the fans. The cd would be recorded into three parts, called episodes, the first episode containing the first four tracks, the second tracks 5 to 8, and the third tracks 9 to 14.

In the meantime the rest of the recordings for Behind the Black Veil continued. On 27 September 2012 it was announced that Manuela Kraller (ex-Xandria) would participate in a duet for the song "Memories Fall", as the Fate character. Two more collaborations were announced later on as well, on 13 January 2013 that of Inga Scharf (character Queen of No Good) and Stefan Schmidt from German metal band Van Canto for the song "Evil Roots", and on 29 August 2014 that of Tony Kakko (character The Moon) from Finnish metal band Sonata Arctica for the song "Light in You". Parviainen completed the lyrics with the help of Emy Frost, Janne Storm and Perttu Vänskä, and the music with Frost, Storm, Mikko P. Mustonen and Stefan Schmidt. Videos for the songs "Memories Fall" (feat. Manuela Kraller), "Hunting the Dreamer" and "Light in You" (feat. Tony Kakko) were released.

The album was produced and mixed by Mikko P. Mustonen (Delain, Sonata Arctica, Ensiferum) who also handled orchestrations, and mastered by Henkka Niemisto (Volbeat, Sonata Arctica, Korpiklaani), with artwork by Jan Yrlund (Apocalyptica, Ensiferum, Sirenia).

== Track listing ==
All lyrics are written by Heidi Parviainen except where noted; all music is composed by Emy Frost except where noted.

No.	Title	Lyrics	Music	Length
1.	"Save Me"			4:23
2.	"Poison Apple"			4:17
3.	"Hide And Seek"	Parviainen, Frost		5:13
4.	"Memories Fall" (feat. Manuela Kraller)			4:22
5.	"Evil Roots" (feat. Inga Scharf)		Stefan Schmidt	4:29
6.	"Violent Roses"	Parviainen, Perttu Vänskä		5:03
7.	"Hunting The Dreamer"			5:32
8.	"Fortress"			5:35
9.	"Silver Tree"	Parviainen, Janne Storm	Janne Storm, Mikko P. Mustonen	4:45
10.	"Sun, Moon And Stars"			4:13
11.	"Light In You" (feat. Tony Kakko)		P. Mustonen	3:58
12.	"Sarah's Theme"			2:35
13.	"A Grim Christmas Story"	Parviainen, Vänskä		3:27
14.	"Memories Fall (Orchestral Version)" (bonus track)			4:24

== Personnel ==
=== Dark Sarah ===
- Heidi Parviainen – vocals
- Erkka Korhonen – guitar
- Rude Rothstén – bass
- Lauri Kuussalo – drums

=== Guest instrumentalists ===
- Kasperi Heikkinen – guitar on tracks 1 and 2
- Teemu Laitinen – drums on tracks 1 and 2
- Jukka Koskinen – bass on tracks 1, 2, 3, and 4
- Petri Kangas – piano on track 12

=== Guest vocalists ===
- Manuela Kraller – vocals on track 4
- Inga Scharf – vocals on track 5
- Van Canto – backing vocals on track 5
- Tony Kakko – vocals on track 11
- Tuomas Nieminen (Throne of Chaos) – backing vocals on tracks 9 and 11

=== Production ===
- Mikko P. Mustonen – producer, mixing, orchestrations
- Henkka Niemisto – mastering
- Jan Yrlund – cover artwork
