= Take a Chance – A Metal Tribute to ABBA =

Studio album by Amberian Dawn
- Released: 2 December 2022
- Genres: Power metal, symphonic metal
- Length: 43:14
- Label: Napalm
- Producer: Tuomas Seppälä

Amberian Dawn chronology
Looking for You (2020)	Take a Chance – A Metal Tribute to ABBA (2022)	Temptation's Gates (2026)

Singles from Take a Chance – A Metal Tribute to ABBA
- 1. "SOS" Released: 5 October 2022; 2. "Gimme! Gimme! Gimme! (A Man After Midnight)" Released: 8 November 2022; 3. "Super Trouper" Released: 29 November 2022; 4. "The Day Before You Came" Released: 24 January 2023

Take a Chance – A Metal Tribute to ABBA is the tenth studio album by the band Amberian Dawn, released on 2 December 2022. It is a cover album consisting entirely of songs by ABBA, following up from their cover of that group's hit single "Lay All Your Love on Me" that was originally in the previous album Looking for You. Lyric videos were made for their covers of "Super Trouper" and "The Day Before You Came". It is the final album to feature Päivi "Capri" Virkkunen before her departure in March 2026.

== Track listing ==
1. "Super Trouper" – 4:11
2. "Gimme! Gimme! Gimme! (A Man After Midnight)" – 4:31
3. "SOS" – 3:01
4. "Head over Heels" – 3:38
5. "The Day Before You Came" – 5:50
6. "Angeleyes" – 4:15
7. "That's Me" – 3:14
8. "Mamma Mia" – 3:37
9. "Under Attack" – 3:47
10. "Like an Angel Passing Through My Room" – 3:14
11. "Lay All Your Love on Me" – 3:56

== Personnel ==
=== Amberian Dawn ===
- Tuomas Seppälä – keyboards, guitars
- Joonas Pykälä-aho – drums
- Emil "Emppu" Pohjalainen – guitars
- Päivi "Capri" Virkkunen – vocals
- Jukka Hoffren – bass

=== Production ===
- Mikko Karmila – mixing
- Karri Harju – photography
- Emil Pohjalainen – mixing (track 3), mastering
- Jan Yrlund – artwork, layout
