= Lente =

Lente may refer to:

- Lente insulin, a discontinued formulation of human insulin as a medicine.
- Lente Loco, Spanish-language comedy television series.
- 'Festina lente', adage.
- Derrick J. Lente, New Mexico politician.
- Miklós Lente, Canadian cinematographer

== See also ==
- Lento (disambiguation)
