= Innuendo (disambiguation) =

An innuendo is a figure of speech that indicates an indirect or subtle, usually derogatory or sexually suggestive implication in expression; an insinuation; sometimes originating from multiple meanings of words or similarly spelled and/or pronounced wording.

Innuendo may also refer to:

- Innuendo (album), a 1991 music album by Queen
  - "Innuendo" (song), the opening track of the album
- "Innuendo (I Get U)", a 2026 Underscores song from the album U
- Innuendo (group), a Malaysian R&B trio
- Innuendo (Amberian Dawn album), 2015
