= Marras =

Marras may refer to:

- Andreia Marras, Brazilian volleyball player
- Antonio Marras, Italian fashion designer
- Giacinto Marras, Italian opera singer
- Giorgio Marras, Italian sprinter
- Leonardo Marras, Italian politician
- Luigi Efisio Marras, Italian general
- Manuel Marras, Italian footballer
- Marras (album), 2012 album by Harmaja
