= Temptation's Gates =

Studio album by Amberian Dawn
- Released: 26 June 2026
- Studios: Sonic Pump (Helsinki); Encore (Hyvinkää); Nestruction (Hyvinkää); Wavespace (Helsinki)
- Genre: Symphonic metal
- Length: 36:54
- Label: Napalm
- Producer: Tuomas Seppälä

Amberian Dawn chronology
Take a Chance – A Metal Tribute to ABBA (2022)	Temptation's Gates (2026)

Singles from Temptation's Gates
- 1. "Temptation's Gates" Released: 24 March 2026; 2. "The Vision of Dreaming" Released: 21 April 2026

Temptation's Gates is the eleventh studio album by the Finnish symphonic metal band Amberian Dawn. The album was released on 26 June 2026, by Napalm Records. It is the first album to feature Nicole Willerton on vocals.

== Background ==
On 24 March 2026, Amberian Dawn announced Capri Virkkunen's departure from the band, simultaneously announcing Nicole Willerton as her replacement.

== Release and promotion ==
Coinciding with the change of vocalists, the band also announced the upcoming eleventh studio album, Temptation's Gates and the lead single of the same name. Willerton stated that the song "Temptation's Gates", which was inspired by Les Fleurs du mal by Charles Baudelaire, is about facing one's inner desires and accepting what they truly like and want. On 21 April 2026, Amberian Dawn released the second single "The Vision of Dreaming". Tuomas Seppälä originally wrote the song in 2021 and it lyrics refers to the "deep spiritual and emotional connection between two people".

== Track listing ==
All lyrics are written by Nicole Willerton; all music is composed by Tuomas Seppälä.

Temptation's Gates track listing
No.	Title	Length
1.	"Temptation's Gates"	2:52
2.	"The Vision of Dreaming"	3:40
3.	"Moon"	4:09
4.	"Unchained"	3:31
5.	"Eternal Flame"	4:11
6.	"Life Is Art"	3:40
7.	"This Night Is Waiting for Me"	3:18
8.	"Undying Colours"	4:03
9.	"The Garden"	3:02
10.	"Phantasmagoria"	4:13
Total length:		36:54

=== Note ===
- The chorus of "Life Is Art" is partially based on Giuseppe Verdi's opera La traviata.

== Personnel ==
Credits are adapted from the album's liner notes.

=== Amberian Dawn ===
- Tuomas Seppälä – keyboards, guitar, production, keyboard and guitar recording, orchestral arrangement on "Unchained"
- Nicole Willerton – vocals, vocal recording
- Emil Pohjalainen – guitar, mixing, mastering, drum and guitar recording
- Jukka Hoffren – bass
- Joonas Pykälä-aho – drums

=== Additional contributor ===
- Jan "Örkki" Yrlund – artwork, layout
- Elisa Häyrinen – make up
- Kanerva Mantila – band photography
- Michael Rodenberg – orchestral arrangement on "Unchained" and "Life Is Art"
- Miiro Varjus – bass recording

== Charts ==
Chart performance for Temptation's Gates
Chart (2026)	Peak position
French Rock & Metal Albums (SNEP)	93
