= Fatal Design =

Studio album by Entwine
- Released: 23 August 2006
- Recorded: March–May 2006, Petrax, Groveland, Lahti and Wave Sound Studios (Finland)
- Genre: Gothic metal
- Length: 42:08
- Label: Spinefarm
- Producer: Janne Joutsenniemi, Aksu Hanttu

Entwine chronology
diEversity (2004)	Fatal Design (2006)	Painstained (2009)

Professional ratings
Review scores
Source	Rating
Metal Hammer	5/10 stars
metal.de	8/10
Rock Hard	7.5/10
Chronicles of Chaos	7/10

Fatal Design is the fifth studio album by Finnish gothic metal band Entwine. It was released in 2006 on Spinefarm Records.

== Track listing ==
All music and lyrics written by Entwine. All songs arranged by Entwine and Janne Joutsenniemi.

1. "Fatal Design" – 3:58
2. "Chameleon Halo" – 3:33
3. "Out of You" – 3:45
4. "Surrender" – 3:50
5. "Oblivion" – 4:10
6. "Twisted" – 3:54
7. "Insomniac" – 4:20
8. "My Serenity" – 4:05
9. "Break Me" – 4:48
10. "Curtained Life" – 5:45

== Personnel ==
- Mika Tauriainen – vocals
- Tom Mikkola – guitar
- Jaani Kähkönen – guitar
- Joni Miettinen – bass
- Aksu Hanttu – drums
- Riitta Heikkonen – keyboards, vocals

=== Additional personnel ===
- Heikki Heikki Pöyhiä – backing vocals
- Jules Näveri – additional vocals on "Twisted"
- Aksu Hanttu – programming
- Jake Kilpiö – additional programming

== Notes ==
- Engineered by Aksu Hanttu and Jaani Kähkönen
- Drums engineered by Aleksanteri Kuosa
- Mixed by Mikko Karmila at Finnvox Studios, Finland
- Mastered by Thomas Eberger at Cutting Room, Stockholm
- Cover art and design by Tomi Tauriainen
- Band photography by Jani Mahkonen
- E-logo by Jani Saajanaho
- Japanese release features bonus track "Hearts of Frozen Stone"
- A remixed version of the song "Break Me" is featured in a YouTube fan film sequel entitled JC's Halloween II.

== Charts ==
Chart (2006)	Peak position
Finnish Albums Chart	11

== Singles ==
- "Surrender"
- "Chameleon Halo"

== Videos ==
- Break Me on YouTube
- Surrender on YouTube
