= Looking for You (album) =

Looking For You

Studio album by Amberian Dawn
- Released: 31 January 2020
- Genre: Symphonic metal, pop metal
- Length: 42:38
- Label: Napalm
- Producer: Tuomas Seppälä

Amberian Dawn chronology
Darkness of Eternity (2017)	Looking For You (2020)	Take a Chance – A Metal Tribute to ABBA (2022)

Singles from Looking for You
- 1. "Lay All Your Love on Me" Released: 29 November 2019; 2. "Looking for You" Released: 17 January 2020

Professional ratings
Review scores
Source	Rating
Dead Rhetoric	9/10
Ghost Cult Magazine	7/10

Looking For You is the ninth studio album by the band Amberian Dawn, released in 2020. The band released a music video for the title track in early 2020.

This album has more emphasis on keyboards and vocals than any of the band's previous albums. This new stylistic direction for the band has been referred to as "ABBA-metal". The immense popularity of their cover of that group's hit single "Lay All Your Love on Me" has led to fans suggesting an ABBA cover album, an idea that would serve as the basis for their next album, Take a Chance – A Metal Tribute to ABBA.

== Track listing ==
1. "United" – 3:44
2. "Eternal Fire Burning" – 4:18
3. "Looking For You" – 3:38
4. "Two Blades" – 3:43
5. "Symphony No.1, Pt.3:Awakening" – 6:00
6. "Go For A Ride" – 3:56
7. "Butterfly" – 3:37
8. "Universe" – 3:47
9. "Lay All Your Love on Me" (ABBA cover) – 3:56
10. "Au Revoir" – 2:05

== Personnel ==
=== Amberian Dawn ===
- Tuomas Seppälä – keyboards, guitars
- Joonas Pykälä-aho – drums
- Emil "Emppu" Pohjalainen – guitars
- Päivi "Capri" Virkkunen – vocals
- Jukka Hoffren – bass

=== Production ===
- Emil Pohjalainen – mixing
- Karri Harju – photography
- Emil Pohjalainen – mastering
- Jan Yrlund – artwork, layout
