= Sorrowburn =

Studio album by Charon
- Released: November 1998
- Recorded: 1998 at BRR studio, Raahe, Finland
- Genre: Gothic metal
- Length: 46:08
- Label: Emanzipation Productions
- Producer: J. Matinheikki

Charon chronology
Pilgrimage (promo) (1995)	Sorrowburn (1998)	Tearstained (2000)

Professional ratings
Review scores
Source	Rating
Scream Magazine	4/6

Sorrowburn is the debut album of the Finnish gothic metal band Charon. The style of the album is markedly different from most of Charon's music – the tentative foray into death metal territory evident on Sorrowburn was not to last, and the band soon found their sound naturally transforming into more a contemporary rock-metal style in their later albums.

== Track listing ==
1. "Burndown" – 2:06
2. "Wortex" – 4:57
3. "Breeze" – 3:37
4. "Serenity" – 4:34
5. "To Serve You" – 3:12
6. "Nightwing" – 4:08
7. "Neverbirth" – 6:31
8. "Kheimos" – 3:36
9. "November's Eve" – 4:54
10. "Morrow" – 8:33

== Personnel ==
- Juha-Pekka "JP" Leppäluoto – lead vocals
- Pasi Sipilä – guitar
- Jasse von Hast – guitar
- Antti Karihtala – drums
- Teemu Hautamäki – bass, harsh vocals

Production

- Charon – cover design and art
- J. Matinheikki – recording, mixing, production
