= Little Angel (song) =

Single by Charon

from the album Downhearted
- Released: 2001
- Genre: Gothic metal
- Label: Spinefarm records
- Producer(s): Juha Matinheikki

Charon singles chronology
"Little Angel" (2001)	"In Trust of No One" (2003)

"Little Angel" is the first single from the Finnish gothic metal band Charon, from their album Downhearted. The single reached number 5 on the Finnish singles chart.

== Track listing ==
1. Little Angel
2. Sister Misery
