= Songs for the Sinners =

Studio album by Charon
- Released: 31 August 2005
- Recorded: February – March 2005, Studio 303 and Finnvox Studios, Helsinki
- Genre: Gothic metal
- Length: 44:02
- Language: English
- Label: Spinefarm Records
- Producer: Mikko Karmila; Charon

Charon chronology
The Dying Daylights (2003)	Songs for the Sinners (2005)

Singles from Songs for the Sinners
- 1. "Ride on Tears"; 2. "Colder"

Songs for the Sinners is the fifth and final full-length album by the Finnish gothic metal act Charon.

It was rated an eight out of ten by Metal Temple Magazine.

== Track listing ==
1. "Colder" – 4:50
2. "Deep Water" – 4:15
3. "Bullet" – 4:11
4. "Rain" – 3:57
5. "Air" – 3:31
6. "She Hates" – 4:21
7. "Ride on Tears" – 3:38
8. "Gray" – 3:49
9. "Rust" – 4:44
10. "House of the Silent" – 6:39

== Personnel ==
=== Band members ===
- Juha-Pekka Leppäluoto – vocals
- Pasi Sipilä – guitars, programming, keyboards
- Lauri Tuohimaa – guitars
- Teemu Hautamäki – bass
- Antti Karihtala – drums

=== Guest musicians ===
- Jenny Heinonen – female vocals
- Santeri Kallio – keyboards
- Tomi Koivusaari – sitar
- Marko Manninen – cello
- Kari Tornack – Hammond solo on "Bullet"
