= Capri Virkkunen =

Finnish singer

- Also known as: Päivi Selo
- Born: Päivi Virkkunen; 28 February 1972 (age 54); Vaasa, Finland
- Genres: Glam rock, europop, symphonic power metal
- Occupations: Singer-songwriter, vocal coach
- Instruments: Vocals, piano
- Years active: 1997–present
- Label: Napalm Records

Päivi Virkkunen, later named Päivi Selo, (born 28 February 1972), and simply known as Capri, is a Finnish musician. From 2012 to 2026, she was the vocalist of the Finnish symphonic power metal band Amberian Dawn, replacing earlier band vocalist Heidi Parviainen, starting with the band's compilation album Re-Evolution.

== Early life ==
Capri first began singing in front of audiences at the young age of three. As a teenager, she began to play the piano, and as well focused on vocal lessons on both classical and rock singing, but preferably, she took rock singing as her main focus. By the time she reached the age of 19, she took singing lessons, she studied to become a vocal coach.

In her early years, Capri studied at the Central Ostrobothnia Conservatory of Music in 1991, and taught at the Oriveden Institute. Among other things, she was a singing coach for Tampere Workers' Theatre in the musical Chicago.

== Career ==
=== Solo career ===
At the start of Capri's career, she participated in many song competition such as the Finnish MTV3 singing talent competition Syksyn Sävel twice. Signed to Sony Music label, she released two pop solo albums. Salaa Sinun mostly written by songwriter Kari Salli was released on Polydor in 1997 with five tracks launched as singles. She toured with the band Swingers to promote her album.

She also took part in a music television competition Syksyn sävel on MTV3 twice, first singing "Vertigo" in 1998 and later "Oot kuin varjo vierelläin" in 2000 without winning the competition. In 2001. she followed up with a second solo album titled Kuun Morsian again mostly with songs by Kari Salli released on AGM label.

She later focused on song interpretations of rock and heavy metal songs. More recently, she toured locally with other artists, performing covers ranging from pop songs from Adele, Pink and Roxette to metal songs from Nightwish, Within Temptation and Skid Row amongst others.

Eurovision

In the late 2000s, she took part in qualifications for the Finnish entries for Eurovision Song Contest on two occasions, first with the Finnish dance and pop band Movetron in 2008 where they interpreted "Cupido" and with a second try with the 2009 Finnish representative entry by the Finnish Eurodance band Waldo's People and was in the backing vocals for the Finnish entry "Lose Control" during their performances in Moscow where the 2009 Eurovision Song Contest was held.

=== Amberian Dawn (2012–2026) ===
On 21 December 2012, Amberian Dawn announced that Capri was the new singer after the departure of Heidi Parviainen. She first sang for the band in the June 2013 compilation album, giving new vocal interpretations for songs from four earlier albums by Amberian Dawn, namely River Of Tuoni (2008), The Clouds of Northland Thunder (2009), End of Eden (2010) and Circus Black (2012).

Amberian Dawn released album Magic Forest in 2014 with a new style, which Tuomas Seppälä nicknamed "symphonic metal".

The next Amberian Dawn album "Innuendo", where she is lead vocalist, was released in October 2015.

On 24 March 2026, Virkkunen had left the band due to scheduling reasons.

=== Other works ===
Capri works as a vocal coach in Tampere Workers' Theatre and Musiikkiteatteri Palatsi. She was a studio artist singing backing vocals for works written and produced by Finnish artist Kari Salli for recordings for Merja Raski, Eini T. T. Purontaka. She has been involved in many records of well-known artists, such as Negative, Widespread Panic, Uniklubi, Yö, and the Muska.

In 2013, she portrayed the role of Frida Lyngstad of the band ABBA in a stage musical about the group.

== Discography ==
=== Solo albums ===
- Salaa Sinun (1997)
- Kuun Morsian (2001)

=== Amberian Dawn ===
- Re-Evolution (2013)
- Magic Forest (2014)
- Innuendo (2015)
- Darkness of Eternity (2017)
- Looking for You (2020)
