= Harmaja (album) =

Studio album by Harmaja
- Released: 18 February 2009
- Genre: Acoustic rock
- Length: 45:03
- Label: Wiima

Harmaja chronology
Harmaja (2009)	Lento (2010)

Harmaja is the debut album by Finnish acoustic rock band Harmaja. It was released on 18 February 2009 in Finland through Wiima.

== Track listing ==
1. Vajoan – 4:57
2. Sydäntalvella – 3:39
3. Sataa – 3:59
4. Palavana – 4:36
5. Kevät – 5:12
6. Piiloistaan laulaa – 5:36
7. Alla – 4:28
8. Taivaan pirstaleet – 4:16
9. Varjoina – 8:22

== Personnel ==
- Juha-Pekka Leppäluoto — lead vocals, guitar, Rhodes
- Sami Lauttanen — guitar
- Simo Vuorela — guitar
- Matti "Joki-Matti" Tulinen — bass
- Paula Präktig — piano, vocals, Rhodes
- Riku Kovalainen — drums
