= Lento =

Lento may refer to:

- Lento (skipper), a genus of skippers in the family Hesperiidae
- Lento, Haute-Corse, a French commune located on the island of Corsica
- Lento speech, a relatively slow manner of speaking

== Music ==
- Lento (band), an Italian instrumental metal band; see Ufomammut
- Lento (Harmaja album)
- Lento (music), a tempo indication meaning "slow"
- Lento (Na Yoon-sun album)
- Lento (Skempton), an orchestral composition by Howard Skempton
- "Lento" (Lauren Jauregui and Tainy song)
- "Lento" (Julieta Venegas song)
- "Lento" (RBD song)
- "Lento" (Sara Tunes song)
- "Lento" (Thalía song)
