= The Dying Daylights =

Studio album by Charon
- Released: 22 September 2003
- Recorded: 2003 by Juha Matinheikki at BRR studios, Raahe, Finland
- Genre: Gothic metal
- Length: 44:28
- Label: Spinefarm Records
- Producer: Pasi Sipllä, Mikko Karmila

Charon chronology
Downhearted (2002)	The Dying Daylights (2003)	Songs for the Sinners (2005)

The Dying Daylights is the fourth studio album by Finnish gothic metal band Charon.

== Track listing ==
1. "Failed" – 3:50
2. "Religious/Delicious" – 3:26
3. "Death Can Dance" – 3:41
4. "In Brief War" – 3:49
5. "Guilt on Skin" – 3:16
6. "Unbreak, Unchain" – 5:21
7. "Drive" – 3:36
8. "Every Failure" – 4:45
9. "In Trust of No One" – 3:03
10. "If" – 3:32
11. "No Saint" – 6:09
12. "Built for My Ghosts" (digipak bonus track) – 3:42
13. "Re-Collected" (digipak bonus track) – 3:50

== Personnel ==
- Juha-Pekka "JP" Leppäluoto – vocals
- Pasi Sipilä – guitar
- Jasse von Hast – guitar
- Ant Karihtala – drums
- Teemu Hautamäki – bass

Production

- Recorded by Juha Matinheikki at BRR-studios, Raahe in spring 2003
- Mixed by Mikko Karmila at Finnvox-studios, Helsinki in July 2003
- Mastered by Minerva Pappi at Finnvox-studios, Helsinki in July 2003
- Cover artwork and design by Travis Smith
