= Lento (Harmaja album) =

Studio album by Harmaja
- Released: 21 April 2010
- Genre: Acoustic rock
- Label: Wiima

Harmaja chronology
Harmaja (2009)	Lento (2010)

Lento (transl. Flight) is the second album by Finnish acoustic rock band Harmaja. It was released on 21 April 2010 in Finland through Wiima.

== Track listing ==
1. Alkusoitto (transl. Intro)
2. Viipyvä virta (transl. Delaying Stream)
3. Hauras (transl. Fragile)
4. Pelkkä ihminen (transl. Only Human)
5. Kuuletko (transl. Do You Hear)
6. Liian pimeä (transl. Too Dark)
7. Murheenlaulaja (trans. Singer of Sorrow)
8. Palasia (transl. Pieces)
9. Veli (transl. Brother)
10. Ei viha (transl. Not Hate)
11. Kuinka me voimme (trans. How We Feel)
12. Loppusoitto (transl. Outro)

== Personnel ==
- Juha-Pekka Leppäluoto — lead vocals, guitar, Rhodes
- Sami Lauttanen — guitar
- Simo Vuorela — guitar
- Matti "Joki-Matti" Tulinen — bass
- Paula Präktig — piano, vocals, Rhodes
- Riku Kovalainen — drums
