= In Trust of No One =

Single by Charon

from the album The Dying Daylights
- Released: 16 May 2003
- Recorded: February–March 2003 by Juha Matinheikki at BRR Studios
- Genre: Gothic metal
- Label: Spinefarm records

Charon singles chronology
"Little Angel" (2001)	"In Trust of No One" (2003)	"Religious/Delicious" (2003)

"In Trust of No One" is a single by the Finnish gothic metal band Charon from the album The Dying Daylights. The single entered the Finnish charts at number one.

== Track listing ==
1. "In Trust of No One"
2. "Death Can Dance"

== Credits ==
- Recorded by Juha Matinheikki at BRR Studios in February–March 2003
- Mixed by Mikko Karmila at Finnvox Studios in March 2003
- Mastered by Mika Jussila at Finnvox Studios March 2003
- Cover art by Jasse Von Hast
- Band photography by Timo Isoaho.
