= Tearstained =

Studio album by Charon
- Released: January 2000
- Recorded: 1999 by Juha Matinheikki at BRR studios, Raahe, Finland
- Genre: Gothic metal
- Length: 44:12
- Label: Diehard Progress/Spinefarm Records
- Producer: Mikko Karmila, Mika Jussila

Charon chronology
Sorrowburn (1998)	Tearstained (2000)	Downhearted (2002)

Tearstained is the second studio album by Finnish gothic metal band Charon. It was originally released by the Danish label Diehard Records, which sold the rights to Finland's Spinefarm Records for re-release in 2002.

== Track listing ==
1. "Worthless" – 3:35
2. "Sorrowbringer" – 4:44
3. "4 Seasons Rush" – 4:05
4. "Christina Bleeds" – 3:06
5. "Deepest Scar" – 4:29
6. "The Drift" – 2:35
7. "Sin" – 3:38
8. "Holy" – 5:01
9. "Your Christ" – 3:16
10. "As We Die" – 3:58
11. "The Stone" – 5:45

== Personnel ==
- Juha-Pekka "JP" Leppäluoto – vocals
- Pasi Sipilä – guitar
- Jasse von Hast – guitar
- Ant Karihtala – drums
- Teemu Hautamäki – bass

Production

- Recorded by Juha Matinheikki at BRR-studios, Raahe in November 1999
- Mixed by Mikko Karmila at Finnvox-studios, Helsinki in December 1999
- Mastered by Mika Jussila at Finnvox-studios, Helsinki in December 1999
- Cover artwork and design by Niklas Sundin
