= Circus Black =

Studio album by Amberian Dawn
- Released: 29 February 2012
- Recorded: 2011
- Genre: Symphonic metal, power metal
- Length: 41:05
- Label: Spinefarm/Universal Music Group
- Producer: Tuomas Seppälä

Amberian Dawn chronology
End of Eden (2010)	Circus Black (2012)	Re-Evolution (2013)

Singles from Circus Black
- 1. "Cold Kiss" Released: 2 March 2012

Circus Black is the fourth full-length album by Finnish symphonic power metal band Amberian Dawn.

Stratovarius vocalist Timo Kotipelto provides lead vocals on "Cold Kiss" and keyboardist Jens Johansson (Stratovarius, Dio, Yngwie Malmsteen’s Rising Force) contributed a keyboard solo on "Crimson Flower."

The band commented on the album: "Circus Black is the most impressive AD album so far. Musically it represents the most sophisticated and most symphonic edge of AD-music. There’s more diversity on this album than never before. This is the first time we used a real choir and we gathered some really excellent professional opera singers together to be able to achieve the best sounding choir possible. This choir was conducted by Mikko P. Mustonen from Pathos Music. He also arranged the choir and orchestral parts. We managed once again to get some world-class guests on this album. So, the production is our biggest so far and the final polish on this album was given by Teropekka Virtanen (mixing engineer) and Mika Jussila (mastering engineer) at legendary Finnvox Studios in Finland." This album also marks the final album of the band to feature lead vocalist Heidi Parviainen as well as lead guitarist Kasperi Heikkinen and drummer Heikki Saari.

== Track listing ==
All music by Tuomas Seppälä, all lyrics by Heidi Parviainen

No.	Title	Length
1.	"Circus Black"	3:48
2.	"Cold Kiss"	3:30
3.	"Crimson Flower"	4:23
4.	"Charnel's Ball"	4:46
5.	"Fight"	3:19
6.	"Letter"	4:28
7.	"I Share with You This Dream"	3:36
8.	"Rivalry Between Good and Evil"	3:59
9.	"Guardian"	5:09
10.	"Lily of the Moon"	4:07

Japanese bonus track
No.	Title	Length
11.	"Guardian (Instrumental)"	4:01

== Music video ==
"Cold Kiss" is the only song on the album to have its own music video, which was officially released through Spinefarm Records in early March 2012. It features Timo Kotipelto being bitten by vampires.

== Personnel ==
=== Band members ===
- Heidi Parviainen – vocals
- Tuomas Seppälä – keyboards, guitar, producer, engineer
- Kasperi Heikkinen – guitar
- Kimmo Korhonen – guitar
- Jukka Koskinen – bass
- Heikki Saari – drums and percussion

=== Guest/session musicians ===
- Timo Kotipelto – vocals on "Cold Kiss"
- Jens Johansson – keyboard solo on "Crimson Flower"
- Nils Nordling – vocals on "I Share With You This Dream"
- Tuomas Nieminen – vocals on "I Share With You This Dream"
- Armi Pävinen – backing vocals on "Cold Kiss"
- Mikko P. Mustonen – orchestral arrangements, choir arrangements, programming, conductor

=== Crew ===
- Lari Takala – engineer
- Tero-Pekka Virtanen – mixing
- Mika Jussila – mastering
