= Soulrelic =

Finnish band

Soulrelic were a Gothic melodic metal band from Finland who formed in 2003. The band decided to separate in 2007. They were signed to Spinefarm Records. They are also known as Kurakello, but the reason for this is unknown outside of the band. The group issued a statement on 24 March 2007 which stated that they saw no 'light at the end of the tunnel' for their project at that time after they had been dropped by their record label. However, the band stated it might be possible that they would write new material in the future.

The band's debut single, 'Hollow Craving' was produced by Asku Hanttu from Entwine and mixed by Mikko Karmila at Finnvox Studios in Helsinki. It was released on 14 April 2005. The single spent three weeks in top 10 in the Finnish top 20 singles charts. They also toured with the Finnish metal band To/Die/For in March/April 2005 in mainland Europe. Their second single 'Tears of Deceit' entered the Finnish top 20 in the singles charts at number 13.

The band's debut album, Love is a Lie we Both Believed was released in 2005 in Finland and Russia. A follow-up album, Like the Rain of Shame We Fall, was recorded and was going to be released in 2007, however this did not materialize as the group were involved in a dispute with their record label over the musical direction and image of the band. The first album contained elements of synth pop and melodic vocals, which Spinefarm felt was commercial. However, the second album contained material which was classified as Gothic and Progressive. The band felt that they wanted to go back to their original roots and did not want to be forced into changing their sound for commercial reasons. They also wanted to tone down their vibrant, glam rock image.

== Discography ==
=== Albums ===
- Love Is a Lie We Both Believed (2005)
- Like the Rain of Shame We Fall (2007) (Unreleased)

=== Singles ===
- Hollow Craving (2005)
- Tears of Deceit (2005)

== Line-up ==
- Tommy Suomala- Vocals- (2004-2007)
- Antza Talala- Guitar- (2003-2006)
- Pecu Talala- Bass- (2003-2007)
- Jani Hölli- Keyboards- (2003-2007)
- Raymond Pohjola- Drums- (2003-2007)
- Timo 'Tinke' Niemistö- Guitar- (2006-2007)
