= Magic Forest (album) =

Studio album by Amberian Dawn
- Released: 27 June 2014
- Recorded: 2014
- Genre: Symphonic power metal
- Length: 42:49
- Label: Napalm
- Producer: Tuomas Seppälä

Amberian Dawn chronology
Re-Evolution (2013)	Magic Forest (2014)	Innuendo (2015)

Singles from Magic Forest
- 1. "Magic Forest" Released: 2 June 2014

Magic Forest is the sixth studio album by Finnish power metal band Amberian Dawn. It is the first original album to feature lead vocalist Päivi "Capri" Virkkunen.

== Track listing ==
No.	Title	Lyrics	Music	Length
1.	"Cherish My Memory"	Capri	Tuomas Seppälä	4:20
2.	"Dance Of Life"	Capri	Tuomas Seppälä	3:12
3.	"Magic Forest"	Capri	Tuomas Seppälä	4:40
4.	"Agonizing Night"	Capri	Tuomas Seppälä	3:51
5.	"Warning"	Capri	Tuomas Seppälä	3:21
6.	"Sons Of The Rainbow"	Capri	Tuomas Seppälä	3:29
7.	"I'm Still Here"	Capri	Tuomas Seppälä	3:52
8.	"Memorial"	Capri	Tuomas Seppälä	3:48
9.	"Endless Silence"	Capri	Tuomas Seppälä	3:42
10.	"Green-Eyed"	Capri	Tuomas Seppälä	4:29

Japanese Bonus Track
No.	Title	Lyrics	Music	Length
11.	"Firefly"	Peter James Goodman	Tuomas Seppälä	3:19

Digipak Bonus Tracks
No.	Title	Lyrics	Music	Length
12.	"Dance Of Life" (Instrumental)	Capri	Tuomas Seppälä	3:16
13.	"Warning" (Instrumental)	Capri	Tuomas Seppälä	3:41

== Personnel ==
=== Band members ===
- Päivi "Capri" Virkkunen – vocals
- Tuomas Seppälä – keyboards, guitar
- Joonas Pykälä-Aho – drums
- Emil "Emppu" Pohjalainen – guitars
- Kimmo Korhonen – guitars

=== Guest/session musicians ===
- Jukka Hoffren - bass guitar
- Jens Johansson - keyboard solo on track 2
- Markus Nieminen - vocals on track 8
- Peter James Goodman - vocals on track 11
