= The Clouds of Northland Thunder =

Studio album by Amberian Dawn
- Released: 13 May 2009
- Recorded: 2008
- Studios: Rockstar Productions Studio, Hyvinkää, Finland
- Genres: Symphonic metal, power metal
- Length: 45:47
- Label: KHY Suomen Musiikki
- Producers: Tommi Kuri, Tuomas Seppälä

Amberian Dawn chronology
River of Tuoni (2008)	The Clouds of Northland Thunder (2009)	End of Eden (2010)

Singles from The Clouds of Northland Thunder
- 1. "He Sleeps in a Grove" Released: 13 May 2009

Professional ratings
Review scores
Source	Rating
Brave Words & Bloody Knuckles	8.0/10
DPRP.net	5/10

The Clouds of Northland Thunder is the second full-length studio album by Finnish symphonic power metal band Amberian Dawn. It was released 13 May 2009. Its single, "He Sleeps in a Grove", was the third Amberian Dawn song to have a music video produced.

A bonus track on Amberian Dawn's third album End of Eden shares its title with the album.

"He Sleeps in a Grove", "Incubus", "Kokko – Eagle of Fire","Willow of Tears", "Shallow Waters", "Snowmaiden", "Saga", "Lionheart", "Lost Soul", "Sons of Seven Stars", and "Morning Star" are featured as downloadable songs on the Rock Band Network.

== Track listing ==
All lyrics are written by Heidi Parviainen; all music is composed by Tuomas Seppälä.

No.	Title	Length
1.	"He Sleeps in a Grove"	3:20
2.	"Incubus"	5:03
3.	"Kokko – Eagle of Fire"	3:17
4.	"Willow of Tears"	4:10
5.	"Shallow Waters"	3:38
6.	"Lost Soul"	3:43
7.	"Sons of Seven Stars"	3:43
8.	"Saga"	4:06
9.	"Snowmaiden"	3:45
10.	"Lionheart"	3:43
11.	"Morning Star"	4:56
12.	"Birth of the Harp"	4:06

Japanese edition bonus track
No.	Title	Length
13.	"Omen"	3:34
Total length:		49:21

== Personnel ==
Amberian Dawn

- Heidi Parviainen – vocals, lyrics
- Tuomas Seppälä – guitar, keyboards, orchestral arrangements, producer
- Kasperi Heikkinen – guitar
- Emil Pohjalainen – guitar
- Tom Joens (as Tommi Kuri) bass guitar, producer
- Joonas Pykälä-aho – drums

Guest/session musicians

- Peter James Goodman – additional vocals on "Incubus"

Production

- Lari Takala – engineer
- Tero-Pekka Virtanen – mixing
- Svante Forsbäck – mastering
