= River of Tuoni =

Studio album by Amberian Dawn
- Released: 30 January 2008
- Recorded: January–July 2007
- Studio: Rockstar Productions Studio, Hyvinkää, Finland
- Genre: Symphonic metal, power metal
- Length: 35:50
- Label: KHY Suomen Musiikki
- Producer: Lari Takala, Tommi Kuri, Tuomas Seppälä

Amberian Dawn chronology
Amberian Dawn (demo) (2006)	River of Tuoni (2008)	The Clouds of Northland Thunder (2009)

Singles from River of Tuoni
- 1. "River of Tuoni" Released: 30 January 2008; 2. "My Only Star" Released: 30 January 2008

Professional ratings
Review scores
Source	Rating
Metal Temple	5/10 stars
Rock Hard	7.0/10

River of Tuoni is the debut full-length studio album by Finnish symphonic power metal band Amberian Dawn.

The songs "River of Tuoni" and "My Only Star" from the album were the first Amberian Dawn tracks to have a music video recorded, in May of 2008 and January 2009 respectively.

The bonus track "Dreamchaser" is an instrumental version of a song by Atheme One, a band which featured founding Amberian Dawn members Tuomas Seppälä, Tommi Kuri, Heikki Saari and Tom Sagar. The song appeared on the band's demo, which had a limited release in 2006 and was later sold through Amberian Dawn's forum and Facebook group in December 2010.

All songs from this album are featured as downloadable content songs on the Rock Band Network.

== Track listing ==
All lyrics are written by Heidi Parviainen; all music is composed by Tuomas Seppälä

No.	Title	Length
1.	"River of Tuoni"	3:00
2.	"My Wings Are My Eyes"	3:12
3.	"Lullaby"	3:41
4.	"Valkyries"	3:27
5.	"Fate of the Maiden"	2:50
6.	"My Only Star"	4:21
7.	"The Curse"	4:04
8.	"Passing Bells"	4:01
9.	"Sunrise"	3:29
10.	"Evil Inside Me"	3:47
11.	"Dreamchaser" (Japan bonus track)	4:00

== Personnel ==
Amberian dawn

- Heidi Parviainen – vocals
- Kasperi Heikkinen – clean guitar parts on "My Only Star", 1st and 3rd solo on "Dreamchaser"
- Tuomas Seppala – all other guitars, additional keyboards, producer, assistant engineer
- Tom Sagar– keyboards
- Tommi Kuri – bass
- Joonas Pykälä-Aho – drums

Guest/session musicians

- Heikki Saari – drums
- Jarmo Lahtiranta – kettle drums
- Vakosametti – choir (Erkki Kaikkonen, Juha Palkeinen, Markku Haikenen, Mikko Moilanen, Teemu Paananen, Tommi Kohlemainen) on "My Wings Are My Eyes", "Lullaby" and "Passing Bells"
- Peter James Goodman – male vocals on "Lullaby" and "Passing Bells"

Production

- Lari Takala – producer, engineer, mixing
- Tommi Kuri – producer, assistant engineer
- Tero-Pekka Virtanen – mixing
- Svante Forsbäck – mastering
