= Leo Harmaja =

Finnish economist

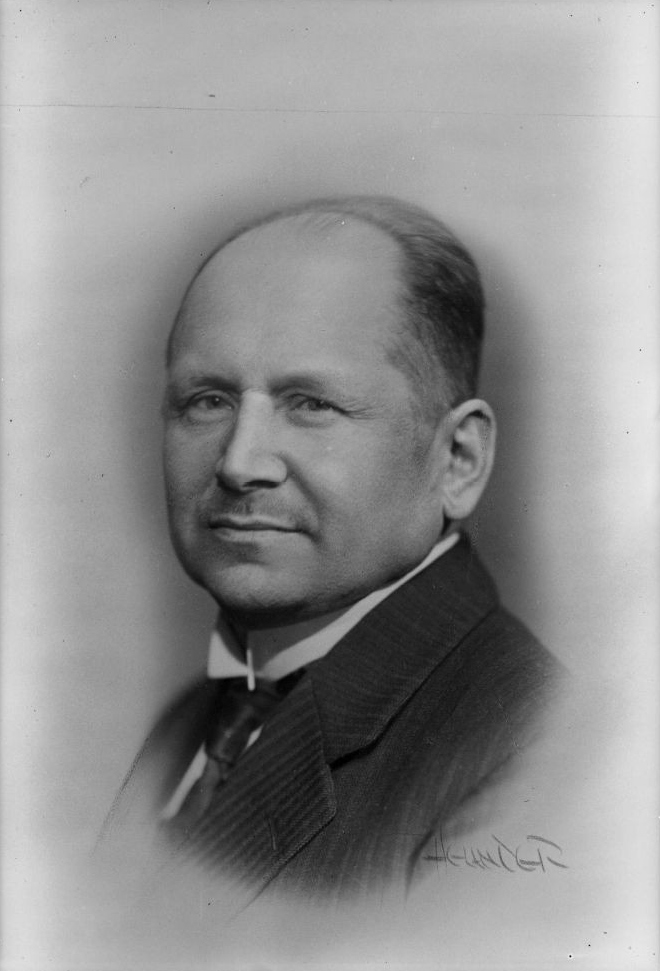
- Born: Leo Schadewitz
- Occupation(s): Economist, statistician, professor

Leo Harmaja (né Schadewitz) was a Finnish economist and statistician and professor of economics.

Leo Harmaja graduated from the Mikkeli Lyceum in 1898 and then studied at the University of Helsinki, graduating with a bachelor's degree in philosophy in 1903 and a licentiate in philosophy and a doctorate in philosophy in 1907. Harmaja's dissertation was on the implementation of the Gothenburg system in Finland.

Harmaja was the first president of the Finnish Statistical Society.

Harmaja was an assistant professor of economics, finance and statistics at the University of Helsinki from 1935 to 1945 and acting economist at the Helsinki University of Technology.

Harmaja was a professor of economics at the Helsinki University of Technology from 1945 to 1948.

Harmaja also worked as a teacher at the Finnish Business School from 1907 to 1929, at the School of Social Sciences 1925–1939 and at the School of War from 1930. Harmaja was the editor-in-chief of the Handbook of Political Science until 1924 and the editor of the Social Journal until 1935.

Harmajan served as chairman, secretary, member, or expert of several state committees. He represented Finland at international congresses in Rome in 1925, in London in 1934, in Bern in 1925, and in Paris in 1937. Harmaja co-founded the Citizens' College in 1925 (since 1930 the Social University). Harmaja was awarded the title of Chancellor Counselor in 1934.

Harmaja was secretary of the National Economic Association in 1918–1934, treasurer in 1918–1935, and supervisor in 1936. He was a member of the editorial board of the National Economic Journal in 1933–1949, head of the Social Policy Association in 1933–1935 and 1940, and deputy chairman 1935–1936 and 1949. He was also the chairman of the Association of Civil Servants of the Social Government in 1929–1934, a member of the Central Board of the Finnish Association of Civil Servants in 1930–1933 and vice chairman in 1933, and the vice chairman of the Spiritual Work Group in 1934–1935.
