= End of Eden =

Studio album by Amberian Dawn
- Released: 20 October 2010
- Recorded: 2009–2010
- Studios: Rockstar Productions Studio, Hyvinkää, Finland
- Genres: Power metal, symphonic metal
- Length: 44:30
- Label: Spinefarm
- Producer: Tuomas Seppälä

Amberian Dawn chronology
The Clouds of Northland Thunder (2009)	End of Eden (2010)	Circus Black (2012)

Singles from End Of Eden
- 1. "Arctica" Released: 23 August 2010

End of Eden is the third studio album by Amberian Dawn, and the first released on Spinefarm Records, previous albums having been released on KHY Suomen Musiikki. The album was released on 20 October 2010, but was preceded by its online single "Arctica" on 23 August.

== Background ==
In November 2009, Amberian Dawn settled back in Finland after their The Clouds of Northland Thunder tour with Epica and Sons of Seasons. On 23 November the official website announced that main composer Tuomas Seppälä had many new songs finished for a third album, to be released in 2010, and that lyricist Heidi Parviainen had started writing the new lyrics. The recordings started in late 2009 with drums, and were finished within a half year.

On 12 July 2010 Amberian Dawn officially announced that the next album would be called End of Eden, and would be released on 20 October of that year. They also reported having signed with Spinefarm Records. The album title was thought up relatively late in the process, when all music was finished and the lyrics were on the way, alongside the album art inspired by the name and concept.

On 18 July the band announced on their website that the upcoming album was to be called End of Eden, and on 23 August they announced the cover art and track list. At the same time they released an online single, "Arctica", for download on MySpace and Spotify.

The album was released on 20 October alongside the music video of the lead single "Arctica".

== Composition ==
=== Musical style ===
The album was early reported to be "more diverse, faster and darker than [...] previous albums" and to have "a bigger, more polymorphic sound". The music site Necroweb points out in a review that many songs have a much more melancholic approach than on earlier albums, especially in "War in Heaven" and "Come Now Follow".

This album also has more complex song structures. Composer and keyboardist Tuomas Seppälä has commented that "I just wanted to try something different and quite boldly experimented with different kind of musical styles. Those styles are not new to me, but I haven't composed this kind of stuff to AD before. I'm planning to continue this kind of experiments in the future also and will definitely do some even more shocking stuff for AD in the future."

One song on the album, "Virvatulen Laulu", is both written entirely in Finnish and in a classical style rather than the band's otherwise heavy metal approach. Seppälä comments, "I wanted to experiment more on this album, and the result include "Virvatulen Laulu" which is a classical piece".

Seppälä has called "War in Heaven", the final song on the album, "a very slow, dark and heavy piece of music and it's definitely not a typical AD song. I just wanted to compose a song to AD in a feeling of 80's heavy metal I like so much." Alongside "Talisman" and "City of Corruption", he calls it his favorite off the album. This is also the longest track ever created by Amberian Dawn, at 7:24.

The song "Ghostly Echoes" is a remake of the song "World of Insanity" by Atheme One, a band which featured founding Amberian Dawn members Tuomas Seppälä, Tommi Kuri, Heikki Saari and Tom Sagar. The song appeared on the band's demo, which had a limited release in 2006 and was later sold through Amberian Dawn's forum and Facebook group in December 2010.

=== Lyrical themes ===
Speculations quickly arose after the track list and cover art reveal whether End of Eden was to be a concept album, but this was denied by Seppälä in an October 2010 interview, in which he said that "despite there's many song names that are somehow religion related, this is not a concept album". He also commented on the colour change from earlier album (blue to red) was a reflection of the developing music, and felt natural.

Other than the songs related to religion there are many stories related to Finnish mythology and the Kalevala, including "Sampo" which refers to a magical artifact, and "Field of Serpents" which references a story in which Ilmarinen got a task to plow a field of serpents before he could marry one of Louhi's daughters.

One song is Amberian Dawn's first not written in English but in Finnish, "Virvatulen Laulu", which translates to "Song of Friar's Lantern". Lyricist Heidi Parviainen has said about the song, "Virvatulen Laulu is a sad love story of a man and a friar´s lantern - a light that shines upon a pond in the night. And because the friar´s lantern disappears when the morning comes they can only meet when the night is dark. They sing together their sad lovesong."

One of the Japanese bonus tracks share its title with Amberian Dawn's second album The Clouds of Northland Thunder.

== Reception ==
Professional ratings
Review scores
Source	Rating
HeavyLaw	8/10 stars
Necroweb	9.5/10 stars
Rock Hard	7.0/10

Necroweb gave the album 9.5 stars out of 10, praising the band's ability to "combine a certain melancholy mood with fast melodies", but also noted that while the band has evolved from The Clouds of Northland Thunder, it is a quite minimal step in the right direction. The French webzine Rock'n'France called the album "an epic and mystical call, like an ode to a pagan prayer in a church built by lakes and forests", and went on to praise especially its overall atmosphere, saying that "if the legends like the movies were accompanied by a soundtrack, it would be [Amberian Dawn's] music you heard at dawn from the deep woods around a fire".

Metal Sickness on the other hand called the album averaged, praising some sections of composition, including solos and Heidi Parviainen's vocal quality, but complaining on certain tracks lacking any real interest, including "Ghostly Echoes" and "Field of Serpents". The Finnish opera piece "Virvatulen Laulu", was also complained upon. HeavyLaw accused the band of repetition and self-plagiarism, especially in songs such as "Talisman", "Come Now Follow", and the lead single "Arctica", but also praised reneweal in songs such as "Sampo" and "Field of Serpents", and believed that the album's best tracks (including "Viratulen Laulu") also were the best of Amberian Dawn, opposite to the album's worst being their worst overall.

== Track listing ==
The album has been released in two versions, one European and one Japanese. The European version ends with "War in Heaven", while the Japanese version continues with two bonus tracks - and extended version of "Sampo" and an outro song called "The Clouds of Northland Thunder".

"Tailsman", "Come Now Follow", "Arctica", "Ghostly Echoes", "Sampo", "Blackbird", "Field Of Serpents", "City Of Corruption" and "War in Heaven" are featured as downloadable songs on the Rock Band Network.

All lyrics are written by Heidi Parviainen; all music is composed by Tuomas Seppälä.

No.	Title	Length
1.	"Talisman"	3:41
2.	"Come Now Follow"	3:47
3.	"Arctica"	4:59
4.	"Ghostly Echoes"	5:44
5.	"Sampo"	3:12
6.	"Blackbird"	3:58
7.	"Field of Serpents"	3:39
8.	"City of Corruption"	4:20
9.	"Virvatulen Laulu"	3:46
10.	"War in Heaven"	7:24

Japanese edition bonus tracks
No.	Title	Length
11.	"Sampo" (extended solo version)	3:38
12.	"The Clouds of Northland Thunder"	2:33
Total length:		50:41

== Personnel ==
Amberian Dawn

- Heidi Parviainen – vocals
- Tuomas Seppälä – keyboards, guitar, orchestral arrangements, producer, engineer
- Kasperi Heikkinen – guitar
- Emil Pohjalainen – guitar
- Tommi Kuri – bass
- Joonas Pykälä-Aho – drums

Guest/session musicians

- Jens Johansson – additional keyboards on "City of Corruption" and "War in Heaven"
- Markus Nieminen – operatic male vocals on "Virvatulen Laulu"
- Peter James Goodman – male vocals on "War in Heaven"

Production

- Lari Takala – engineer, mixing
- Svante Forsbäck – mastering
