= Darkness of Eternity =

Studio album by Amberian Dawn
- Released: 10 November 2017
- Studio: Encore Music Oy; Pathos Music; D-studio; Hyvinkää
- Genre: Symphonic power metal
- Length: 42:47
- Label: Napalm; Avalon
- Producer: Tuomas Seppälä; Emil Pohjalainen; Jassi; Mikko P. Mustonen

Amberian Dawn chronology
| Innuendo (2015) | Darkness of Eternity (2017) | Looking for You (2020) |

Singles from Darkness of Eternity
- 1. "Maybe" Released: 18 September 2017; 2. "I'm the One" Released: 19 October 2017

Professional ratings
Review scores
| Source | Rating |
|---|---|
| Dead Rhetoric | 7.5/10 |
| Ghost Cult Magazine | 6/10 |

Darkness of Eternity is the eighth studio album by the Finnish symphonic power metal band Amberian Dawn. The album continues the band's usual sound while adding "infusions of poppiness making each song oh-so-addictive, with some ABBA-licious vibes and euphoric moodiness." A music video was released for the song "I'm the One".

== Track listing ==
Darkness of Eternity track listing
| No. | Title | Length |
|---|---|---|
| 1. | "I'm the One" | 4:06 |
| 2. | "Sky Is Falling" | 4:03 |
| 3. | "Dragonflies" | 5:42 |
| 4. | "Maybe" | 3:36 |
| 5. | "Golden Coins" | 3:51 |
| 6. | "Luna My Darling" | 4:58 |
| 7. | "Abyss" | 3:25 |
| 8. | "Ghostwoman" | 4:01 |
| 9. | "Breathe Again" | 4:49 |
| 10. | "Symphony Nr. 1, Part 2 - Darkness of Eternity" | 4:16 |
| Total length: | | 42:47 |

Bonus track
| No. | Title | Length |
|---|---|---|
| 11. | "Anyone" | 3:38 |
| Total length: | | 46:25 |

== Personnel ==
=== Band members ===
- Jukka Hoffren – bass
- Joonas Pykälä-Aho – drums
- Emil Pohjalainen – guitar
- Tuomas Seppälä – keyboards, guitar
- Päivi "Capri" Virkkunen – vocals

=== Crew ===
- Jan "Örkki" Yrlund – artwork, layout, photography
- Tuomas Seppälä – producer (vocals & guitars), music, recording
- Emil Pohjalainen – producer (drums & guitars), recording
- Jassi – producer (drums), recording
- Mikko P. Mustonen – producer (vocals), co-producer, mixing (tracks: 5), recording
- Päivi "Capri" Virkkunen – lyrics
- Svante Forsbäck – mastering
- Mikko Karmila – mixing (tracks: 1 to 4, 6 to 12)
- Peero Lakanen – photography

=== Companies, etc. ===
- Napalm Records – copyright, phonographic copyright
- Optimal Media GmbH – manufacturer
- Iron Avantgarde Publishing – publisher
- Encore Music Oy – recording
- Pathos Music – recording
- D-studio – recording
- Hyvinkää – recording
- Finnvox – mixing
- Chartmakers – mastering
