= Downhearted (album) =

Studio album by Charon
- Released: 2002
- Recorded: July–September 2001
- Studio: BRR studios, Raahe, Finland
- Genre: Gothic metal
- Length: 42:25

Charon chronology
Tearstained (2000)	Downhearted (2002)	The Dying Daylights (2003)

Downhearted is the third studio album by the Finnish gothic metal band Charon. The album peaked at number three in the Finnish album charts, while the single "Little Angel" reached number five on the Finnish singles chart.

== Track listing ==
1. "Bitter Joy" – 3:53
2. "At the End of Our Day" – 3:19
3. "Craving" – 4:27
4. "Little Angel" – 3:32
5. "Fall" – 3:44
6. "Erase Me" – 3:30
7. "Desire You" – 3:22
8. "Come Tonight" – 3:10
9. "All I Care Is Dying" – 4:36
10. "Sister Misery" – 3:43
11. "Sorrowsong" – 5:10

== Personnel ==
- Recorded by Juha Matinheikki at BRR-studios, Raahe in July–September 2001
- Mixed by Mikko Karmila at Finnvox-studios, Helsinki in December 2001
- Mastered by Mika Jussila at Finnvox-studios, Helsinki in December 2001
- Cover artwork and design by Niklas Sundin

== Chart ==
Chart (2002)	Peak position
Finnish Albums (Suomen virallinen lista)	3
