= Innuendo (Amberian Dawn album) =

Studio album by Amberian Dawn
- Released: 23 October 2015
- Studio: Encore Music Oy; Pathos Music; D-studio; Hyvinkää
- Genre: Symphonic power metal
- Length: 43:49
- Label: Napalm; Avalon
- Producer: Tuomas Seppälä; Emil Pohjalainen; Jassi; Mikko P. Mustonen

Amberian Dawn chronology
Magic Forest (2014)	Innuendo (2015)	Darkness of Eternity (2017)

Professional ratings
Review scores
Source	Rating
Dead Rhetoric	8.5/10
Ghost Cult Magazine	6/10

Innuendo is the seventh studio album by the Finnish symphonic power metal band Amberian Dawn, released on 23 October 2015. A lyric video was released for the song "The Court of Mirror Hall".

== Track listing ==
Innuendo track listing
No.	Title	Length
1.	"Fame & Gloria"	4:25
2.	"Ladyhawk"	4:35
3.	"Innuendo"	3:38
4.	"The Court of Mirror Hall"	4:15
5.	"Angelique"	5:09
6.	"Rise of the Evil"	3:45
7.	"Chamber of Dreadful Dreams"	3:46
8.	"Knock, Knock, Who's There?"	3:56
9.	"Symphony Nr. 1, Pt. 1 – The Witchcraft"	5:56
10.	"Your Time – My Time"	4:32
Total length:		43:49

Digipak bonus tracks
No.	Title	Length
11.	"Fame & Gloria" (Instrumental)	4:24
12.	"Sunrise" (Re-recording)	3:29
Total length:		51:42

Japanese bonus track
No.	Title	Length
11.	"The Darkest Times"	3:35
Total length:		47:23

== Personnel ==
=== Band members ===
- Jukka Hoffren – bass
- Joonas Pykälä-Aho – drums
- Emil Pohjalainen – guitar
- Tuomas Seppälä – keyboards, guitar
- Päivi "Capri" Virkkunen – vocals

=== Crew ===
- Jan "Örkki" Yrlund – artwork, layout, photography
- Tuomas Seppälä – producer (vocals & guitars), music, recording
- Emil Pohjalainen – producer (drums & guitars), recording
- Jassi – producer (drums), recording
- Mikko P. Mustonen – producer (vocals), co-producer, mixing (tracks: 5), recording
- Päivi "Capri" Virkkunen – lyrics
- Svante Forsbäck – mastering
- Mikko Karmila – mixing (tracks: 1 to 4, 6 to 12)
- Peero Lakanen – photography

=== Companies, etc. ===
- Napalm Records – copyright, phonographic copyright
- Optimal Media GmbH – manufacturer
- Iron Avantgarde Publishing – publisher
- Encore Music Oy – recording
- Pathos Music – recording
- D-studio – recording
- Hyvinkää – recording
- Finnvox – mixing
- Chartmakers – mastering
