= Entwine =

Finnish gothic metal band

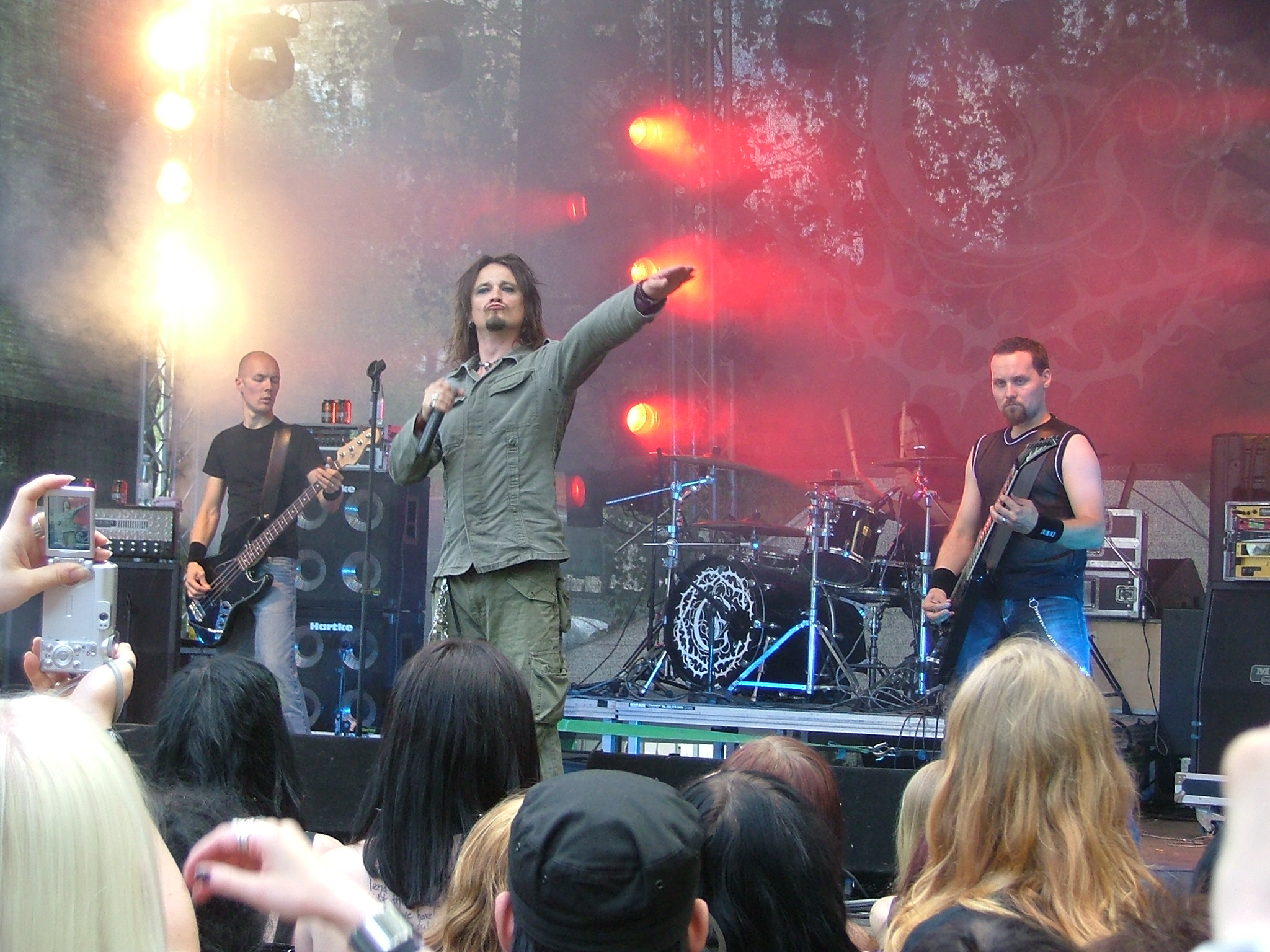
- Entwine at Kuopio Rockcock 2008

Background information
- Origin: Lahti, Finland
- Genres: Gothic metal
- Years active: 1995–2019
- Label: Spinefarm
- Past members: Jaani Kähkönen; Joni Miettinen; Aksu Hanttu; Mika Tauriainen; Tom Mikkola; Riitta Heikkonen; Panu Willman; Teppo Taipale
- Website: entwine.org

Entwine was a Finnish gothic metal band from Lahti, formed in 1995. They released seven studio albums before disbanding in 2019.

== History ==
Entwine was originally assembled under the name Kaamos in 1995 by guitarist and vocalist Tom Mikkola, drummer Aksu Hanttu and bassist Teppo Taipale. They were originally a death metal band with harsh male vocals. In 1997 they decided to change their name to Entwine and their musical style to gothic metal/rock.

Rhythm guitarist and vocalist Panu Willman was added to the band's line-up in 1997. In December of that same year, Entwine recorded its first demo entitled Divine Infinity. In February 1998 keyboard player Riitta Heikkonen joined the band.

Entwine's debut album Treasures Within Hearts was released in September 1999. In April 2000 both Willman and Taipale left the band, with the latter being replaced by Joni Miettinen. Vocalist Mika Tauriainen was added to the band in the following month.

The band's next album Gone was released in April 2001. It received the award of "Album of the Month" from German magazine Hammer and the song "New Dawn" entered the "Finnish Single Charts" in one of the top ten positions.

Jaani Kähkönen joined the band as a live session guitarist in late 2001, but soon became a permanent member of Entwine. In early 2002 the band recorded their third album, Time of Despair, which was produced by Anssi Kippo. Entwine then toured Europe with Theatre of Tragedy and Ram-Zet to promote this release.

In 2003 Entwine recorded their fourth album, diEversity, released in March 2004. This album showed an evolution on their sound, abandoning some of the band's gothic roots and opting for a heavier style. This new style incorporated heavy, de-tuned rhythm guitars alongside more melodic vocals than in previous albums. The band's first single "Bitter Sweet" reached No. 3 on the "Finnish Single Charts" and the album itself reached No. 11 on the "Official Chart of Finland".

Entwine released in August 2005 an EP containing five tracks, entitled Sliver.

In August 2006 Entwine released their fifth album entitled Fatal Design and toured in Europe with German gothic rock band Zeraphine.

On December 8, 2006, keyboardist Riitta Heikkonen announced her departure from the band citing personal reasons. No replacement is planned.

On May 3, 2008, Entwine announced that they had begun work on their sixth studio album which was produced by Hiili Hiilesmaa (HIM, Apocalyptica, Sentenced). The album was set to be released on January 14, 2009, but was pushed back to the 28th. With the title Painstained.

A compilation album was released on June 23, 2010, with the name Rough n' Stripped.

The band announced in January 2014 that they had begun recording their seventh album. On December 22, 2014, the vocals were completed. On May 12, 2015, Entwine stated that they were in the final stages of programming, mixing and mastering the album. On June 25, 2015, the band announced on their official Facebook page that the album had been completed and was now ready for release. The album, Chaotic Nation was eventually released on 2 October 2015.

They played their last gig on 9 November 2019 at Lahti.

== Members ==
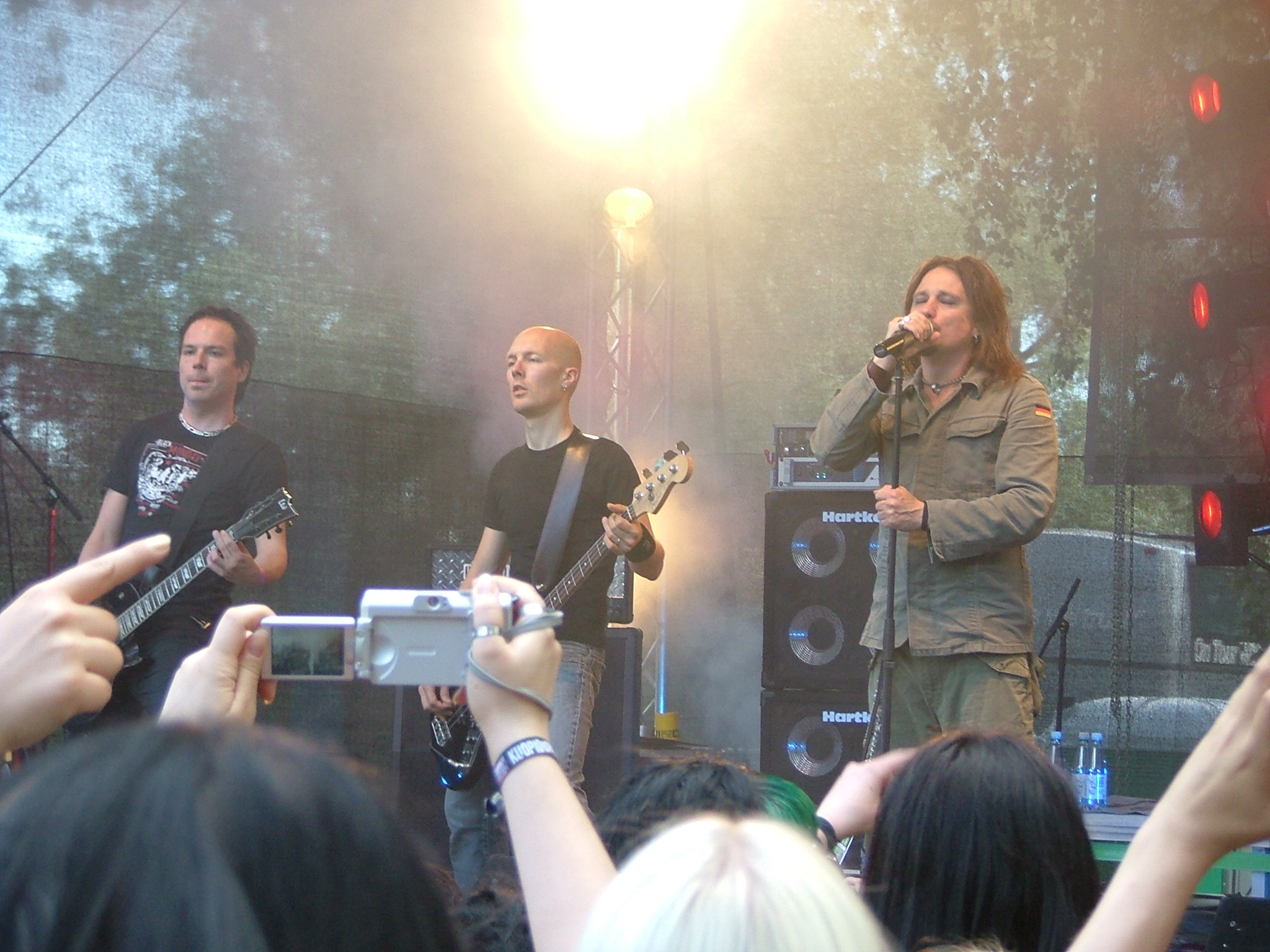
Entwine at Kuopio Rockcock 2008

Last lineup

- Mika Tauriainen – vocals (since 1999)
- Tom Mikkola – guitars (since 1995)
- Jaani Kähkönen – guitars (since 2001)
- Joni Miettinen – bass (since 2000)
- Aksu Hanttu – drums (since 1995)

Former members

- Teppo Taipale – bass (1995–1999)
- Panu Willman – vocals, guitars (1997–1999)
- Riitta Heikkonen – keyboards (1997–2006)

Timeline

== Discography ==
=== Albums ===
- The Treasures Within Hearts (1999)
- Gone (2001)
- Time of Despair (2002)
- DiEversity (2004)
- Fatal Design (2006)
- Painstained (2009)
- Chaotic Nation (2015)

=== EPs ===
- Sliver (2005)

=== Compilations ===
- Rough n' Stripped (2010)

=== Singles ===
- New Dawn (2000)
- The Pit (2002)
- Bitter Sweet (2004)
- Surrender (2006)
- Chameleon Halo (2006)
- Strife (radio only single 2008)
- Save Your Sins (2010)
- Plastic World (2015)

=== Demos ===
- Divine Infinity (1997)
