= Harmaja (band) =

Finnish acoustic rock band

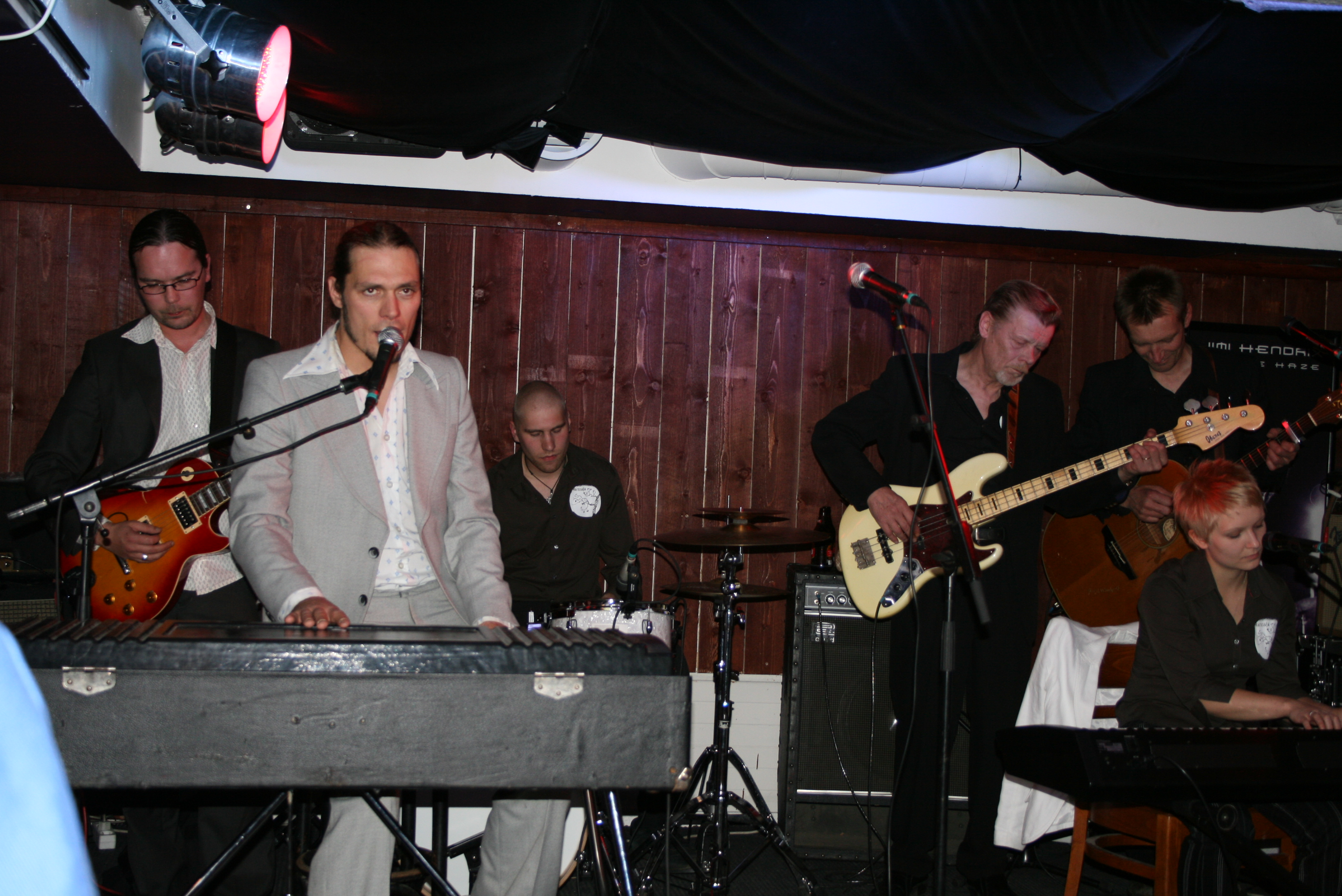
- Harmaja at Rokkikellari in Seinäjoki, Finland

Background information
- Origin: Finland
- Genres: Acoustic rock
- Years active: 2007–present
- Labels: Wiima, Playground
- Members: Juha-Pekka Leppäluoto Simo Vuorela Sami Lauttanen Matti "Joki-Matti" Tulinen Paula Präktig Riku Kovalainen
- Website: harmajaraahe.fi

Harmaja are a Finnish acoustic rock group founded by vocalist Juha-Pekka Leppäluoto in 2007. Their first album, Harmaja, was released on 18 February 2009, and entered the Finnish national chart at position 14.

They primarily record in Finnish.

== Members ==
- Juha-Pekka Leppäluoto – vocals, guitar, Rhodes
- Simo Vuorela – guitar
- Sami Lauttanen – guitar
- Milla Heinonen — bass, vocals
- Paula Präktig – piano, vocals, Rhodes
- Riku Kovalainen – drums

== Discography ==
=== Albums ===
- Harmaja (2009)
- Lento (2010)
- Marras (2012)

=== Videos ===
- "Sataa" (2009)
- "Sydäntalvella" (2009)
- "Katkera Maa" (2012)
