= Charon (band) =

Finnish gothic metal band

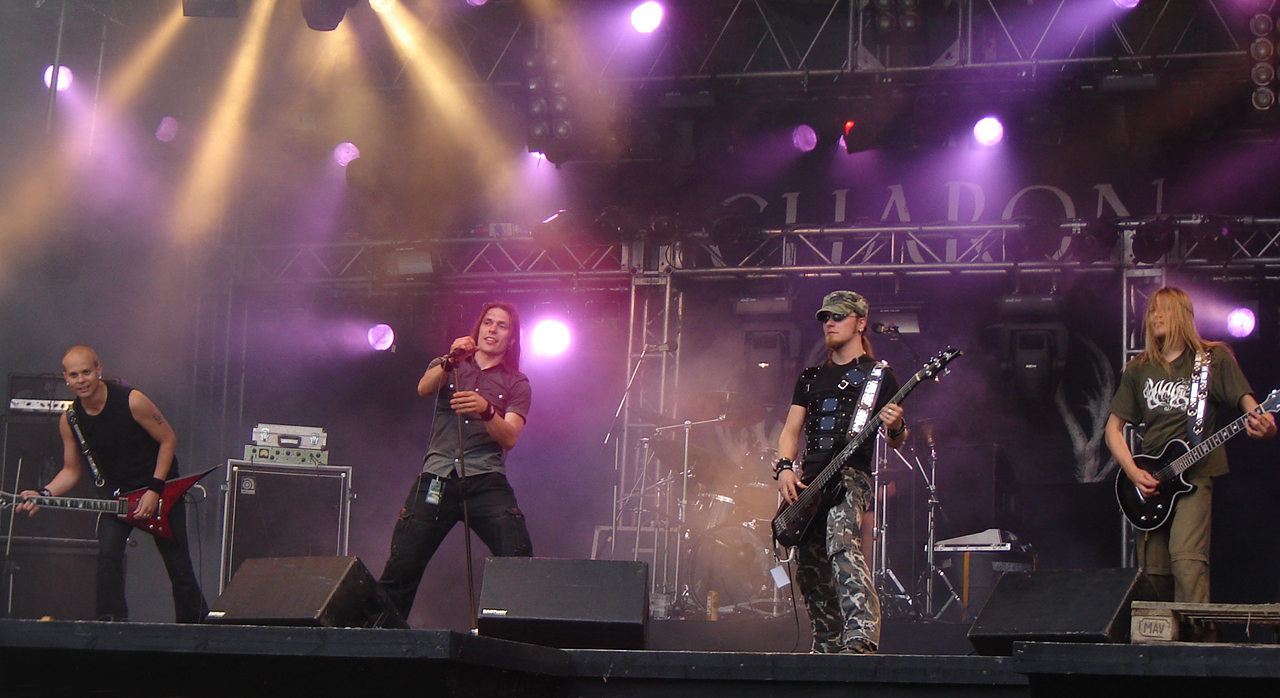
- Charon in 2006

Background information
- Origin: Raahe, Finland
- Genre: Gothic metal
- Years active: 1992–2011; 2015; 2025 – present
- Labels: Spinefarm, Diehard, Emanzipation
- Members: Juha-Pekka Leppäluoto; Antti Karihtala; Teemu Hautamäki; Lauri Tuohimaa; Jasse Von Hast
- Past members: Pasi Sipilä

Charon are a Finnish gothic metal band from Raahe.

== History ==
Charon was founded in 1992 by Antti Karihtala, Teemu Hautamäki, Pasi Sipilä, and Jasse Hast and was originally a brutal death metal act. After releasing three promo albums and two demos, all self-released, the band signed a record deal with Emanzipation Productions. Through Emanzipation, Charon released their first two full-length albums Sorrowburn and Tearstained in 1998 and 2000 respectively. After touring with fellow Finlanders Sentenced, the band parted ways with Emanzipation and signed to Spinefarm Records.

During the summer of 2001 Charon recorded their third studio album Downhearted. Before the release of the full album, the single Little Angel, which rose to number 5 on the Finnish singles chart, was released. In early 2002, Downhearted was released, and it proved to be just as popular as the single. The album rose to the number 3 slot on the Finnish Album Charts while the video for the song "Little Angel" hit No. 1 on the Nordic Video List.

The summer following the release of Downhearted the band went on tour in their native Finland, and directly thereafter the band toured through Europe with Nightwish and After Forever. Then in April 2003, the band released another single, In Trust of No One, which made its debut at No. 1 on the Finnish Singles Chart. Five months later the Religious/Delicious single was released, followed quickly by the band's fourth studio album The Dying Daylights. Immediately after the releases the band went on tour in Finland to support the album.

In November 2003, guitarist Jasse von Hast left the band, citing a lack of interest in playing for the group and boredom with band-related activities as reason for doing so. Lauri Tuohimaa stepped in and officially became the band's new guitarist in January 2004. Charon then went on yet another tour through Finland to support The Dying Daylights.

After several more tours and the release of the single Colder, the band released its fifth album Songs for the Sinners on 31 August 2005. Since then, the band has toured extensively in Europe and Russia. Concerning further releases, the band stated, during the summer, that they had six new tracks ready to record. Then, that autumn, another update was posted on the bands site stating that they have spent the last few weeks recording five new tracks for a demo and that they are currently negotiating a new record deal.

In June 2011, the band posted a news release on their website stating that they have decided to disband after summer concerts in their native Finland. In an interview with Leppaluoto, the band felt they had nothing more to contribute in the genre. And some members where not interested anymore, with conflict going back to 2005.

In October 2015, lead singer JP-Leppaluoto and other members of Charon participated in a music gig in Tavastia on Halloween, effectively reviving Charon for a final time for a show. Since then, Charon has again disbanded, despite some sources labelling the band on an "indefinite hiatus". Charon's Twitter is still somewhat active, only used as promoting other artists.

In March 2025, the band announced a reunion tour of 6 gigs planned in late summer in Finland to commemorate the 20th anniversary of their 2005 album Songs for the Sinners. The shows began in late August and concluded on 13 September in Jyväskylä.

== Members ==
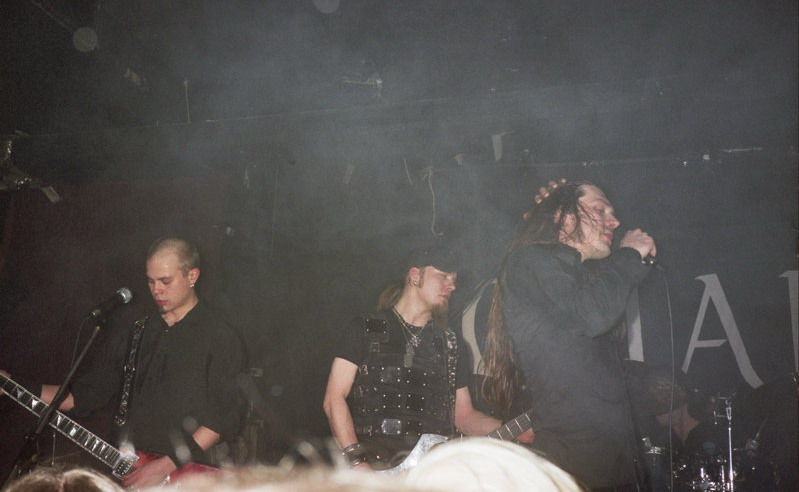
Charon performing in 2005

=== Current members ===
- Juha-Pekka Leppäluoto – lead vocals (1995–2011, 2015, 2025)
- Lauri Tuohimaa – guitar (2003–2011, 2015, 2025)
- Jasse von Hast – guitar (1992–2003, 2025)
- Antti Karihtala – drums (1992–2011, 2015, 2025)
- Teemu Hautamäki – bass (1992–2011, 2015, 2025), harsh vocals (1992–1998)

=== Former members ===
- Pasi Sipilä – guitar (1992–2010)
- Jenny Heinonen - vocals ( 2000-2010)

== Discography ==
=== Albums ===
- Sorrowburn (1998)
- Tearstained (2000)
- Downhearted (2002)
- The Dying Daylights (2003)
- Songs for the Sinners (2005)

=== Singles ===
- "Little Angel" (2001)
- "In Trust of No One" (2003)
- "Religious/Delicious" (2003)
- "Ride on Tears" (2005)
- "Colder" (2005)
- "The Cure" (2010)
- "Fall Of Angels" (2025)

=== Compilation albums ===
- A-Sides, B-Sides & Suicides (2010)

=== Music videos ===
- "November's Eve"
- "Little Angel"
- "Colder"
- "Ride on Tears"
