= Amberian Dawn =

Finnish metal band

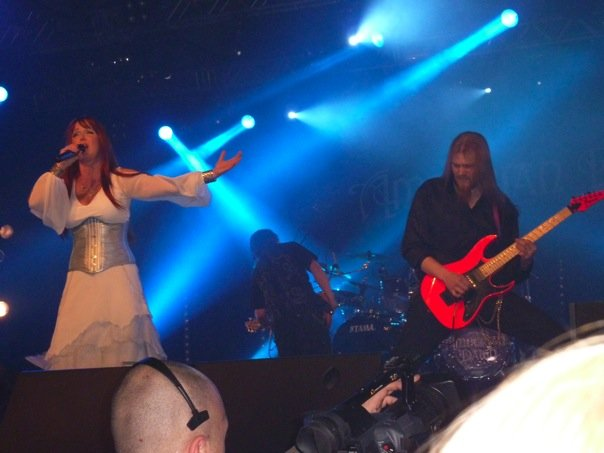
- Amberian Dawn on stage in 2009

Background information
- Origin: Finland
- Genre: Symphonic power metal
- Years active: 2006–present
- Labels: Spinefarm, Napalm
- Members: Tuomas Seppälä; Joonas Pykälä-Aho; Emil Pohjalainen; Jukka Hoffren; Nicole Willerton
- Past members: Sampo Seppälä; Tom Sagar; Tommi Kuri; Heidi Parviainen; Kasperi Heikkinen; Jukka Koskinen; Heikki Saari; Kimmo Korhonen; Capri Virkkunen
- Website: amberiandawn.com

Amberian Dawn is a Finnish symphonic power metal band formed in 2006 by Tuomas Seppälä and Tommi Kuri. As of 2026, Amberian Dawn has released eleven studio albums, four singles, and thirteen music videos.

== History ==
=== Atheme One (2006–2008) ===
Several members that would form Amberian Dawn played in the group Virtuocity, after whose breakup they formed a new band based on keyboardist and guitarist Tuomas Seppälä's songwriting. The band was named Atheme One and had Peter James Goodman as lead singer and lyricist. The band released a demo in 2006 featuring the songs "Dreamchaser", "Velvet Roses", "Burning Touch", and "World of Insanity", three of which would be remade into Amberian Dawn songs. An instrumental version of "Dreamchaser" appears as a bonus track on River of Tuoni, "Velvet Roses" appears with lyrics by Heidi Parviainen as "Sons of Seven Stars" on The Clouds of Northland Thunder, and "World of Insanity" appears with new lyrics as "Ghostly Echoes" on End of Eden.

During the summer of 2006, shortly after releasing the first demo, Seppälä and Kuri replaced Goodman with soprano Heidi Parviainen, who had tired of playing the keyboard in Iconofear and could both sing and contribute lyrics. This completed the lineup of Amberian Dawn. Goodman left amicably and has guested on all three Amberian Dawn albums since.

Their first studio session was in fall 2006, where they recorded two songs at the Rockstar Productions studio in Hyvinkää, Finland. The promotional demo, Amberian Dawn, had the two songs "River of Tuoni" and "Evil Inside Me", both of which would reappear on their debut full-length.

=== River of Tuoni (2008) ===
Amberian Dawn signed a record deal with Finnish label KHY Suomen Musiikki in 2007, and finally recorded their debut album River of Tuoni which was released in Finland on 30 January 2008, hitting the charts right after release in Finland. To support the album, the band was the main supporter for Dutch symphonic metal band Epica during their summer/autumn European tour, and released a music video for their hit song "River of Tuoni" in May 2008.

=== The Clouds of Northland Thunder (2008–2009) ===
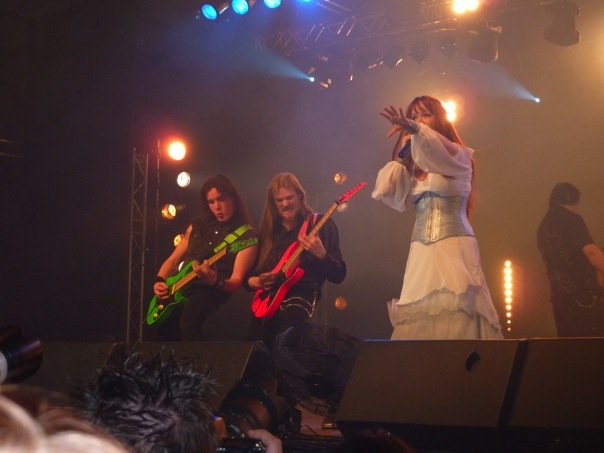
Amberian Dawn performing at the Metal Female Voices Fest in their 2009 The Clouds of Northland Thunder tour.

In late 2008, when the band withdrew from their River of Tuoni tour, band leader Tuomas Seppälä had already finished most songs for a new album, and the recording began almost immediately, but with a few changes in line-up - Emil Pohjalainen of Thaurorod joined on second guitar, and Seppälä moved permanently to keyboards on the live shows, but has continued to record guitars in the studio.

In January 2009, the band released their second music video through YouTube, namely the River of Tuoni track "My Only Star" alongside footage from the 2008 tour. In May, the band released their second studio album, The Clouds of Northland Thunder, alongside their new single "He Sleeps in a Grove" and its music video, and June introduced the band to their first festival, when they played at the Gibson stage on Sweden Rock festival in Sölvesborg, Sweden. In the summer and autumn of 2009, they toured with several heavy metal bands, including Kamelot, Epica, Sons of Seasons and Dream Evil, and played at festivals such as the Metal Female Voices Fest.

=== End of Eden (2009–2011) ===
In November 2009, Amberian Dawn settled back in Finland after their tour with Epica and Sons of Seasons, and main composer Tuomas Seppälä already had many new songs finished for a third album. The band soon announced that a demo was finished and that Heidi Parviainen had started working on lyrics for an album to be released in mid to late 2010.

On 12 July 2010, Amberian Dawn announced that the next album would be called End of Eden, and released in October. They also reported having signed with Spinefarm Records, making End of Eden their first album not produced by KHY Suomen Musiikki. The new album was early on reported to be "more diverse, faster and darker than [...] previous albums" and to have "a bigger, more polymorphic sound", to have some of the fastest AD songs yet, and even an entirely classical piece (later revealed to be "Virvatulen Laulu").

On 23 August, the band announced the cover art and tracklist of the new album, and at the same time they released an online single, Arctica, for free download on MySpace.

The album was released on 20 October, alongside the music video to Arctica, but at the same time, they announced a line-up change. Because of time issues, founding member and bassist Tommi Kuri, drummer Joonas Pykälä-Aho and guitarist Emil Pohjalainen would no longer be part of Amberian Dawn. They were instead replaced with Jukka Koskinen (Norther, Wintersun), Heikki Saari (Norther, Naildown) and Kimmo Korhonen (Waltari, Helion), respectively. The new drummer, Heikki Saari, also used to play with Amberian Dawn in their earliest days, and contributed with drums on two tracks on their River of Tuoni album.

=== Circus Black (2011–2012) ===
Circus Black is the fourth studio Album by Amberian Dawn. It is a concept album and was released in late February 2012. The song Crimson Flower has references to the fairy tale, "Beauty and the Beast".

On 9 November 2012, the band announced on their official site, that they are parting ways with singer Heidi Parviainen, along with drummer Heikki Saari and guitarist Kasperi Heikkinen. Parviainen announced via Facebook, saying "Early this year we noticed that we had reached the point where we didn't have much to offer to each other any more, and my own ambitions and Amberian Dawn's goals weren't coinciding any longer." It was also revealed that ex-members Joonas Pykälä-Aho (drums) and Emil "Emppu" Pohjalainen (guitar) would be replacing the two departing band members.

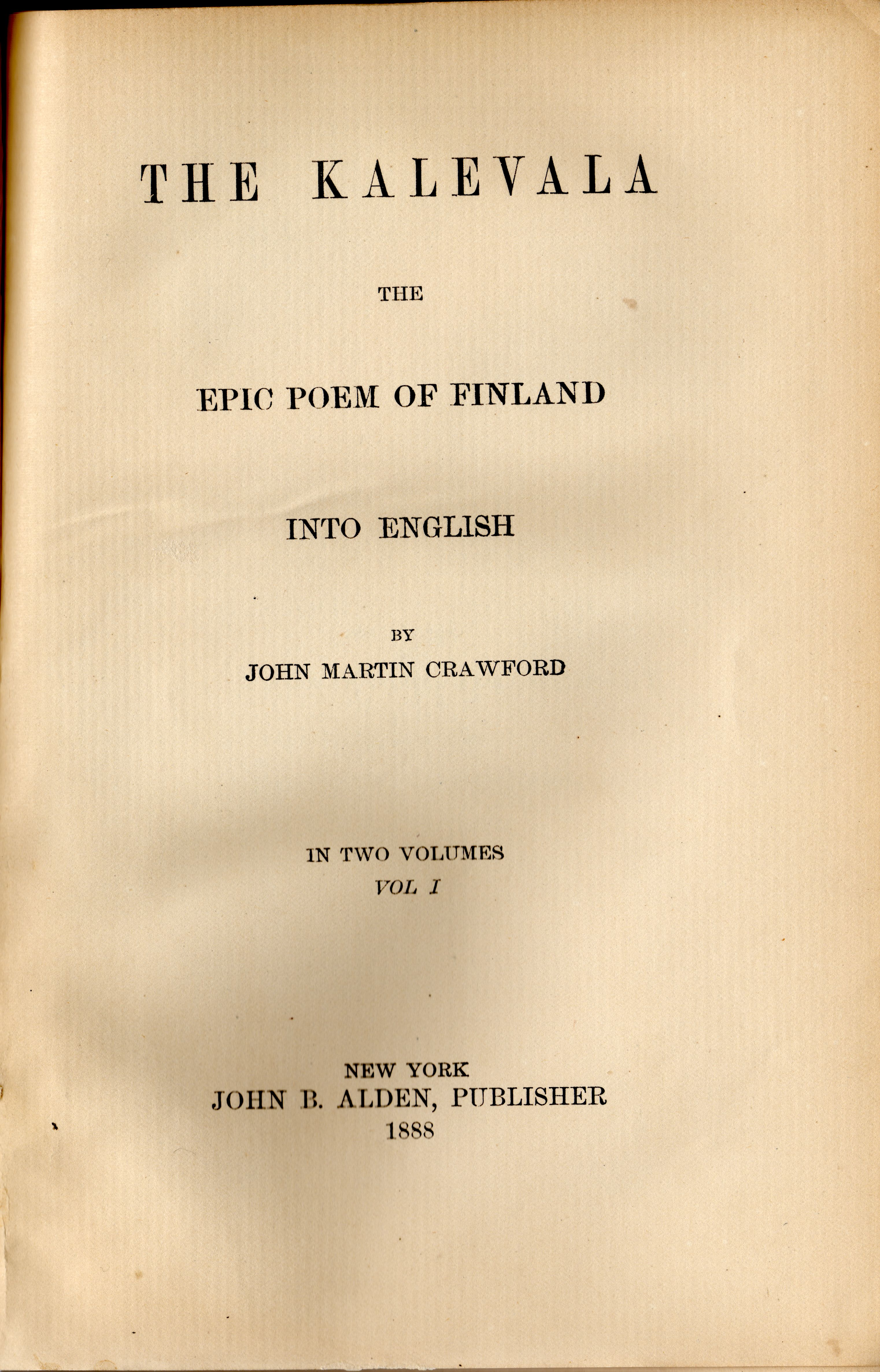
The Kalevala, a national poem of Finland, often referenced in Amberian Dawn's lyrics.

On 21 December 2012, the new singer was revealed to be Päivi "Capri" Virkkunen, and that she would participate in the creation of a compilation album.

In a message on the band's official site, Tuomas Seppälä said: "Finding Capri and getting her to join AD is like a big dream coming true to me. Capri shares the same taste in music as I and that's why is obvious that our new partnership is like “match made in heaven”. She really makes my compositions to shine like never before and I'm so impressed about her every way. I'm as excited as back then, when I found our original singer Heidi. Now my main focus is to make the whole world to hear about Capri and start composing new songs for her. But first, we're all concentrating on recording this compilation album with Capri and then I'll start working with new material for the new studio album".

=== Magic Forest (2013–2014) ===
In March 2014, Amberian Dawn announced its signing to Napalm Records with a release date for Magic Forest in June 2014. According to songwriter and founder Tuomas Seppälä: "Magic Forest is AD's first studio album with singer Capri. With her I've been able to fulfill some of my early dreams with musical styles and this new style is really big, fresh and naturally flowing. The new sound is more keyboard driven and the vocal lines have some strong 1980's influences."

=== Innuendo (2015) ===
On 23 October 2015, Amberian Dawn released their seventh album, Innuendo. Singles from this album were "Fame And Gloria" and "The Court Of Mirror Hall". "Innuendo" included a re-recording of "Sunrise", which had previously been recorded and released with previous singer Heidi.

=== Darkness of Eternity (2017) ===
On 10 November 2017, Amberian Dawn released their eighth album, Darkness of Eternity. The first single from this album was titled "Maybe". This is the third studio album featuring singer Capri. As with the previous Amberian Dawn albums, Seppälä composed all of the music and Capri wrote all of the lyrics. This album coincides with the tenth anniversary of Amberian Dawn's official formation in 2007.

=== Looking for You (2019–2026) ===
On 29 November 2019, Amberian Dawn released a lyric video for their cover version of ABBA's 1980 hit song "Lay All Your Love on Me". This song appeared on their ninth album Looking for You, which was released on 31 January 2020 through the band's label, Napalm Records.

Starting in 2020, the band began to occasionally post small teasers for an upcoming song, album, or EP on Instagram. This later turned out to be a new album of ABBA covers, following the success of Lay All Your Love on Me from the previous album. The album later titled, Take a Chance - A Metal Tribute to ABBA, came out on 2 December 2022.

=== Vocalist changes and Temptation's Gates (2026–present) ===
On 24 March 2026, the band announced Virkkunen's departure from the band, simultaneously announcing Nicole Willerton as her replacement. The band's eleventh studio album, Temptation's Gates, was released on 26 June 2026.

== Musical style ==
=== Instrumentation ===
Amberian Dawn classified themselves as "melodic, dramatic and powerful metal with female classical vocals," and ex-lead singer Heidi Parviainen has called their music "fast tempo, guitar driven metal with purely classical female vocals", while several other sources classify them as symphonic power metal, which the band has agreed sums it up, but also points out that there are many different styles that vary from song to song. In a September 2010 interview, Seppälä defines their music: "Amberian Dawn's music is melodic metal, and the roots lie in the Metal and Rock music of the 70s and 80s and maybe a little bit of the '90s. There are a lot of technical skills within the band, so everyone who's not scared of serious guitar and keyboard shredding should listen to our music."

=== Influences ===
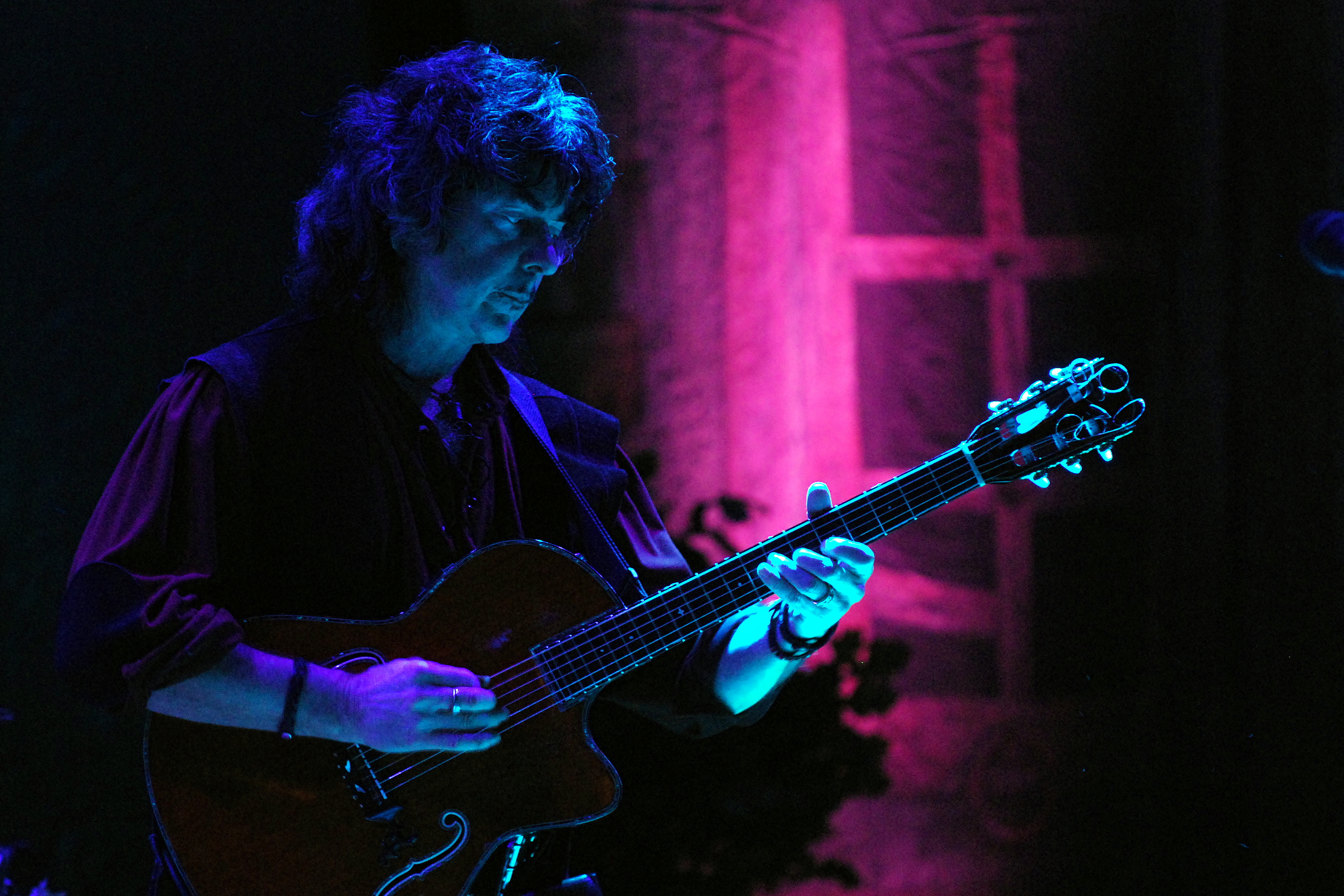
Ritchie Blackmore is one of the prime influences to Amberian Dawn's music.

While many critics have compared Amberian Dawn to other female fronted metal acts such as Nightwish, Seppälä has denied any real connection, and also said that any connections are up to the listener seeing as everyone listens to music their own way. He has pointed out that it's "very funny that no one has yet figured out the real influences behind our music".

Tuomas Seppälä has called his two big musical heroes Ritchie Blackmore and the late Ronnie James Dio, and listed Yngwie Malmsteen and ABBA as some of his influences.

=== Lyrical themes ===
All Amberian Dawn songs are composed by Tuomas Seppälä, who then sent them to Heidi Parviainen who came up with their stories and writes the lyrics depending on her mood and inspiration. The lyrics were often influenced by Finnish and Norse mythology, and many songs reference the Finnish national poem Kalevala, most obviously songs such as "Kokko – Eagle of Fire" from The Clouds of Northland Thunder, and "Sampo" from End of Eden. The title of their second album The Clouds of Northland Thunder, as well as a bonus track on End of Eden with the same title, is a direct quote from the English translation of the Kalevala.

Many other songs have lyrics with their own stories, either retellings of ancient legends, such as "Sons of Seven Stars", which is inspired by the book Seven Brothers by Aleksis Kivi, or brand-new stories out of Parviainen's imagination, such as "Virvatulen Laulu".

== Band members ==
=== Current ===
- Tuomas Seppälä – keyboards, guitars (2006–present)
- Joonas Pykälä-Aho – drums (2006–2010, 2012–present)
- Emil "Emppu" Pohjalainen – guitars (2008–2010, 2012–present)
- Jukka Hoffren – bass (2015–present; session 2014)
- Nicole Willerton – vocals (2026–present)

=== Former ===
- Sampo Seppälä – guitars (2006–2007)
- Tom Sagar – keyboards (2006–2008)
- Heikki "Joey Edith" Saari – drums (2010–2012)
- Tommi Kuri – bass (2006–2010; died 2015)
- Heidi Parviainen – vocals (2006–2012)
- Kasperi Heikkinen – guitars (2007–2012)
- Jukka Koskinen – bass (2010–2013)
- Kimmo Korhonen – guitars (2010–2015)
- Peter James Goodman – vocals (2006)
- Päivi "Capri" Virkkunen – vocals (2012–2026)

== Discography ==
=== Studio albums ===
- River of Tuoni (2008)
- The Clouds of Northland Thunder (2009)
- End of Eden (2010)
- Circus Black (2012)
- Re-Evolution (2013)
- Magic Forest (2014)
- Innuendo (2015)
- Darkness of Eternity (2017)
- Looking for You (2020)
- Take a Chance – A Metal Tribute to ABBA (cover album) (2022)
- Temptation's Gates (2026)

=== Singles ===
- "He Sleeps in a Grove" (2009)
- "Arctica" (2010)
- "Cold Kiss" (2012)
- "Kokko – Eagle of Fire" (2013)

=== Music videos ===
- "River of Tuoni" (2008)
- "My Only Star" (2009)
- "He Sleeps in a Grove" (2009)
- "Arctica" (2010)
- "Cold Kiss" (2012)
- "Kokko - Eagle of Fire" (2013)
- "Magic Forest" (2014)
- "Fame & Gloria" (2015)
- "I'm the One" (2017)
- "Dragonflies" (2017)
- "Cherish My Memory" (2018)
- "Looking For You" (2020)
- "Temptation's Gates" (2026)
- "The Vision of Dreaming" (2026)
- "Unchained" (2026)
- "Moon" (2026)

=== Lyric videos ===
- "The Court of Mirror Hall" (2015)
- "Ladyhawk" (2016)
- "Maybe" (2017)
- "Sky Is Falling" (2018)
- "United" (2019)
- "Lay All Your Love On Me" (ABBA cover) (2019)
- "S.O.S." (ABBA cover) (2022)
- "Gimme! Gimme! Gimme! (A Man After Midnight)" (ABBA cover) (2022)
- "Super Trouper" (ABBA cover) (2022)
- "The Day Before You Came" (ABBA cover) (2023)
