= Heidi Parviainen =

Finnish heavy metal singer

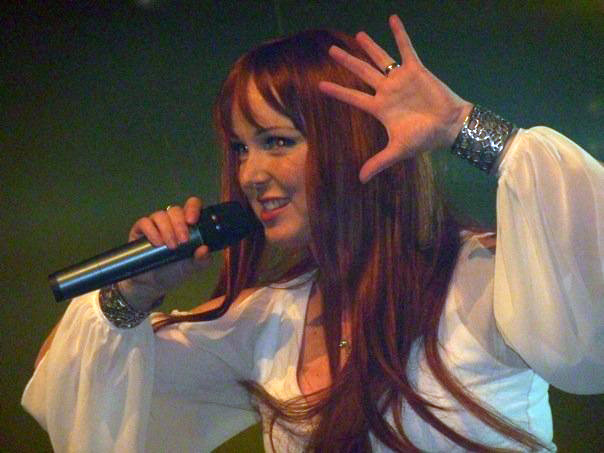
- Parviainen with Amberian Dawn in 2009

Background information
- Born: 8 March 1979 (age 47); Espoo, Finland
- Genres: Symphonic metal; gothic metal; power metal
- Occupations: Singer; songwriter
- Instruments: Vocals; keyboards
- Years active: 1997–present
- Member of: Dark Sarah
- Formerly of: Amberian Dawn; Iconofear
- Website: darksarah.com

Heidi Parviainen (born 8 March 1979) is a Finnish singer. A classically trained lyric soprano, she is the lead vocalist of symphonic metal band Dark Sarah and previously fronted Amberian Dawn.

== Career ==
=== Agonia and Iconofear (1995–2006) ===
Parviainen was the keyboardist and a vocalist in the band Agonia which was active from 1995. The break-up of Agonia led in 1999 to the formation of the band Iconofear, in which Parviainen was again keyboardist/vocalist. Iconofear released three EPs between 2003 and 2006.

=== Amberian Dawn (2006–2012) ===
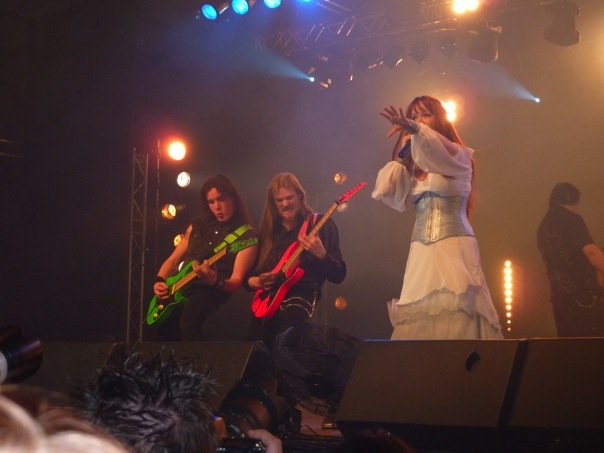
Amberian Dawn performing at the Metal Female Voices Fest on their The Clouds of Northland Thunder tour.

Parviainen joined Amberian Dawn in 2006.

She started to write lyrics which were often influenced by Finnish and Norse mythology, and many of her songs reference the Finnish national poem Kalevala. She undertook three European tours with the band and performed at several European festivals.

On 19 November 2012 the band announced that Parviainen had parted ways with them. The decision was made in early 2012, making Metal Female Voices Fest their last show together with her.

=== Dark Sarah (2012–present) ===
A few days after her departure from Amberian Dawn, Parviainen announced that she had started a new musical project called "Dark Sarah". She said Dark Sarah "is making one of my dreams come true, a dream that had been sleeping for many years but now has finally awoken."

Parviainen explained the concept:

Dark Sarah's story Behind the Black Veil tells a story about a young woman called Sarah. She is left at the altar by her husband and she almost has a mental breakdown but instead something wakes up inside her and she changes to another person, her meaner half: Dark Sarah.

The musical style combines elements of film music, metal music and music theater. The album called Behind the Black Veil, will feature several guest musicians such as Manuela Kraller, Inga Scharf (Van Canto) and Kasperi Heikkinen (U.D.O, Merging Flare). Dark Sarah consists of a band including musicians like: Erkka Korhonen (guitar) (Raskasta Joulua, Northern Kings), Sami-Petri Salonen (guitar), Jukka Koskinen (bass) (Wintersun) and Lauri Kuussalo (drums).

JP Leppäluoto features as “Dragon” in Dark Sarah’s first trilogy

Dark Sarah has first released “The Chronicles,” a trilogy of three albums about the story of Dark Sarah, after an initial EP, “Violent Roses.” The first album, Behind the Black Veil, was released in 2014. This was followed by The Puzzle (released 2016) and The Golden Moth (released 2018). Guest singers came to each portray their unique character related to the storytelling.

In 2020 the band announced their signing to Napalm Records and a new studio album called "Grim", being the first installment of a new story with the main character Luna, though being a continuation of the first three albums. In 2023 the band released their fifth album called "Attack Of Orym".

=== Other works ===
Parviainen has performed with a few other bands in studio, with Eternal Tears of Sorrow on the song "Tears of Autumn Rain" from the album Children of the Dark Waters in 2009, and with Ensiferum on their album Unsung Heroes, providing the choir vocals.

== Discography ==
=== Dark Sarah ===
Studio albums

- Behind the Black Veil (2015)
- The Puzzle (2016)
- The Golden Moth (2018)
- Grim (2020)
- Attack of Orym (2023)

EPs

- Violent Roses (2014)

Music videos

- Save Me (2013)
- Memories Fall (2014) (feat. Manuela Kraller)
- Hunting The Dreamer (2014)
- Light in You (2015) (feat. Tony Kakko)
- Little Men (2016)
- Aquarium (2016) (feat. Charlotte Wessels – lyric video)
- Dance with the Dragon (2016) (feat. Juha-Pekka Leppäluoto)
- Trespasser (2017) (feat. Juha-Pekka Leppäluoto)
- Sky Sailing (2018) (feat. Juha-Pekka Leppäluoto)
- Golden Moth (2018) (feat. Juha-Pekka Leppäluoto)
- The Gods Speak (2018)
- All Ears! (2020)
- Melancholia (2020) – lyric video
- Illuminate (2020)
- B.U.R.N (2023)
- Warning Sign (2023)
- Invincible (2023) – lyric video

=== Amberian Dawn ===
Demos

- Amberian Dawn (demo) (2006)

Studio albums

- River of Tuoni (2008)
- The Clouds of Northland Thunder (2009)
- End of Eden (2010)
- Circus Black (2012)

Singles

- "He Sleeps in a Grove" (2009)
- "Arctica" (2010)
- "Cold Kiss" (2012)

=== Iconofear ===
EPs

- Dark (EP) (2003)
- The 13th Circle (2005)
- The Unbreathing (2006)

=== Agonia ===
Demos

- Demo I (1997)

=== Guest appearances ===
- 2009: Children of the Dark Waters (Eternal Tears of Sorrow) (vocals on "Tears of Autumn Rain")
- 2012: Unsung Heroes (Ensiferum) (choir vocals)
