= JP Leppäluoto =

Finnish musician

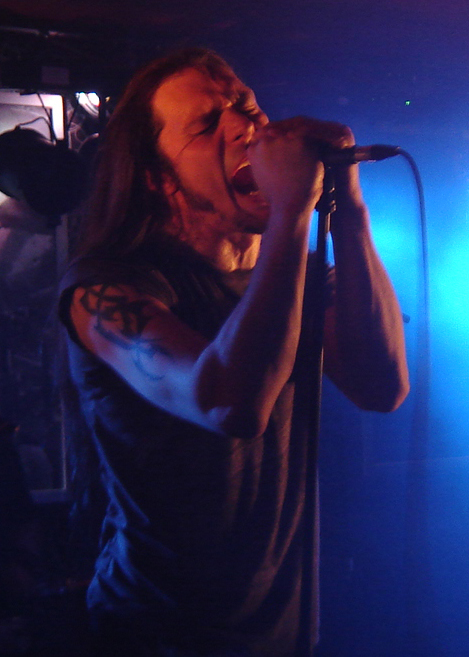
Leppäluoto performing with Charon in 2009

Juha-Pekka "JP" Leppäluoto (born 15 November 1974 in Raahe) is a Finnish musician.

== Career ==
He was in the band Charon until the summer of 2011 as a vocalist and songwriter.

He also formed the band Harmaja as a vocalist, guitar player and songwriter. They released three albums.

Together with Marko Hietala, Tony Kakko, and Jarkko Ahola, he was also in the band Northern Kings as a vocalist.

He provided vocals for the first release from the band Poisonblack, which featured members from several other Finnish rock bands, and also sang in the band Dark Sarah, first as a guest, and then as an official member for one album cycle, before stepping away to focus on a solo career, although he still provides guest vocals for the band.

In 2020 he released his first solo album, titled Piilevää pimeää. In 2022, JP would release his second solo album Jäävuoria. A couple months after his solo release, Northern Kings would play again for the first time in over 10 years.

== Discography ==
With Charon

- Sorrowburn (1998)
- Tearstained (2000)
- Downhearted (2002)
- The Dying Daylights (2003)
- Songs for the Sinners (2005)
- A Side's, B Side's, And Suicides (2010-2011)

With Northern Kings

- Reborn (2007)
- Rethroned (2008)

With Harmaja

- Harmaja EP (2007)
- Harmaja (2009)
- Lento (2010)
- Marras (2012)

With Poisonblack:

- Escapexstacy (2003)

As special guest

- Dark Sarah – Dance with the Dragon (2016)
- Dark Sarah – Trespasser (2017)
- Dark Sarah – The Wolf and the Maiden (2020)
- Dark Sarah – Piece of my Heart (2023)

With Dark Sarah

- The Golden Moth (2018)

Solo as JP Leppäluoto

- Piilevää pimeää (2020)
- Jäävuoria (2022)
