= Beast in Black discography =

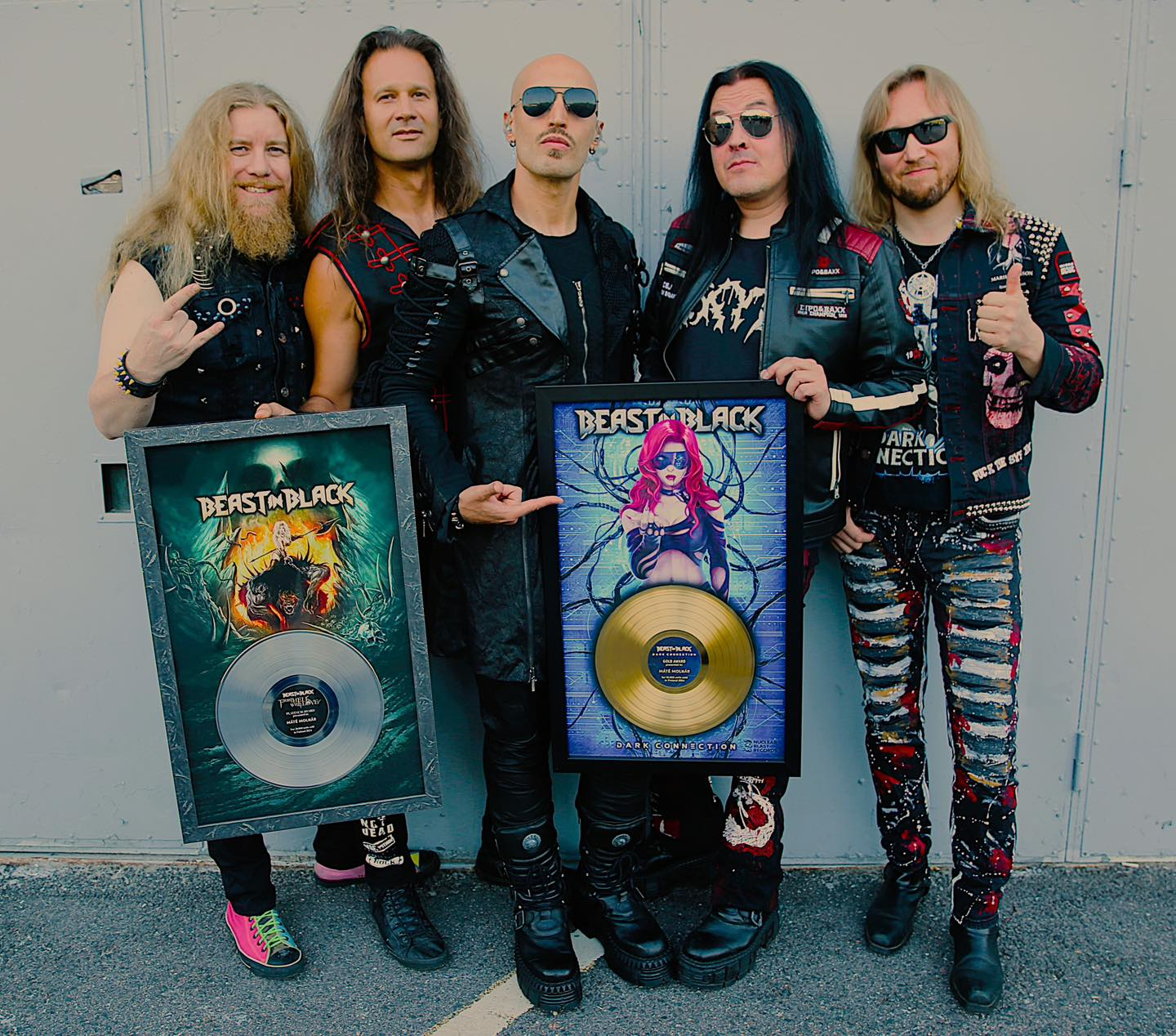
- Beast in Black before their show in the Ice Hall in Helsinki, Finland in 2024
- Studio albums: 3
- Singles: 12
- Music videos: 11

The discography of the Finnish heavy metal band Beast in Black includes three studio albums, 13 singles, and 11 music videos. The band was formed in Helsinki in 2015 by guitarist and primary songwriter Anton Kabanen. The original lineup included lead vocalist Yannis Papadopoulos, bassist Mate Molnar, guitarist Kasperi Heikkinen, and drummer Sami Hänninen. The band started playing locally in Finland while recording their debut album at the same time. The record caught the attention of Nuclear Blast Records, who later signed Beast in Black. The band released Berserker in 2017, which was Beast In Black's first album to be certified gold by the IFPI Finland. While promoting the album, Hänninen left the band and Atte Palokangas was hired as a replacement. In 2019, they released From Hell with Love, followed by Dark Connection in October 2021. In 2024, Beast in Black released a standalone single, "Power of the Beast".

== Albums ==
=== Studio albums ===
List of studio albums, with selected chart positions, sales figures and certifications
Title	Album details	Peak chart positions										Certifications
Title	Album details	FIN	AUT	FRA	GER	NLD	SCO	SPA	SWE	SWI	UK	Certifications
Berserker	Released: 3 November 2017; Label: Nuclear Blast	7	—	—	51	—	—	—	—	33	21	IFPI FIN: Platinum
From Hell with Love	Released: 8 February 2019; Label: Nuclear Blast	1	17	143	6	199	49	73	55	8	2	IFPI FIN: Platinum
Dark Connection	Released: 29 October 2021; Label: Nuclear Blast	1	16	165	13	—	31	—	53	11	7	IFPI FIN: Gold
"—" denotes a recording that did not chart or was not released in that territory.

== Singles ==
List of singles, showing year released and album name
Title	Year	Album
"Blind and Frozen"	2017	Berserker
"Beast in Black"	2017	Berserker
"Born Again"	2017	Berserker
"Zodd the Immortal"	2017	Berserker
"Sweet True Lies"	2018	From Hell with Love
"Die by the Blade"	2019	From Hell with Love
"From Hell with Love"	2019	From Hell with Love
"Moonlight Rendezvous"	2021	Dark Connection
"One Night in Tokyo"	2021	Dark Connection
"Hardcore"	2021	Dark Connection
"Power of the Beast"	2024	Non-album single
"Enter the Behelit"	2025	Non-album single
"Fear the Beast"	2026	Non-album single
"Lost Children"	2026	Non-album single

=== Music videos ===
List of music videos, with directors, showing year released along with albums
Title	Year	Director	Album
"Blind and Frozen"	2017	Ville Lipiäinen	Berserker
"Sweet True Lies"	2018	Ville Lipiäinen	From Hell with Love
"From Hell with Love"	2019	Ville Lipiäinen	From Hell with Love
"Cry Out for a Hero"	2019	Damien Dausch	From Hell with Love
"Moonlight Rendezvous"	2021	Katri Ilona Koppanen	Dark Connection
"One Night in Tokyo"	2021	Katri Ilona Koppanen	Dark Connection
"Hardcore"	2021	Katri Ilona Koppanen	Dark Connection
"Blade Runner"	2023	Damien Dausch	Dark Connection
"To The Last Drop of Blood"	2023	Damien Dausch	Dark Connection
"Power of the Beast"	2024	Katri Ilona Koppanen	Non-album single
"Enter the Behelit"	2025	Katri Ilona Koppanen	Non-album single
"Fear the Beast"	2026	Katri Ilona Koppanen	Non-album single
"Lost Children"	2026	Katri Ilona Koppanen	Non-album single
