= Stamer =

Stamer is a surname. Notable people with the name include:

- Dirk Stamer (born 1980), German politician
- Evan Stamer (born 2001), American racing driver
- Henrik Stamer Hedin (born 1946), Danish communist and translator, chairman of Communist Party of Denmark
- Josh Stamer (born 1977), American football linebacker
- Lovelace Stamer (1829–1908), Anglican Bishop of Shrewsbury
- Ward Stamer, Canadian politician
- William Donovan Stamer (1895–1963), British army officer

== See also ==
- Stamer baronets, Baronetage of the United Kingdom
- Stammer (disambiguation)
- Stahmer
- Starmer (surname)
- Sthamer
