= Strutter (disambiguation) =

"Strutter" is a 1974 song by Kiss.

Strutter may also refer to:

== Film and television ==
- Strutter (TV series), a 2006–2007 MTV series starring Paul Kaye
- Strutter, a 2012 film by Allison Anders
- Strutter, a fictional character in the film Time Bandits

== Other uses ==
- Sopwith 1½ Strutter, a British World War I-era biplane
- Texas State University Strutters, an American collegiate dance team
- Strutter, Greek musician, bassist for the metal band Wardrum

== See also ==
- Strut (disambiguation)
- Stutter (disambiguation)
