= Strut (disambiguation) =

A strut is a structural component.

Strut(s) may also refer to:

== Technology and computing ==
- Strut (typesetting), a vertical rule with no width
- Strut bar, an automotive suspension accessory
- Strut channel, a standardized formed structural system
- MacPherson strut, a component of some vehicle suspensions
- Apache Struts, a web application framework for Java

== Linguistics ==
- The STRUT vowel /ʌ/ in English, which historically was back, as referred to in the name of FOOT–STRUT split.

== Film and television ==
- Strut (TV series), a 2016 American reality show
- Strut!, a documentary film by Max Raab

== Music ==
- The Struts, an English rock band
- Strut Records, a British record label

=== Albums ===
- Strut (album) or the title song (see below), by Lenny Kravitz 2014
- Strut, by Kevin Toney, 2001
- Strut, by Michael Kaeshammer, 2004

=== Songs ===
- "Strut" (The Cheetah Girls song), 2006
- "Strut" (Lenny Kravitz song), 2014
- "Strut" (Sheena Easton song), 1984
- "Strut", a song by Adam Lambert from For Your Entertainment, 2009
- "Strut", a song by Bloc Party from Alpha Games, 2022
- "Strut", a song by KMFDM from Blitz, 2009
- "Strut", a song by Steven Seagal featuring Lady Saw from Songs from the Crystal Cave, 2004
- "Strut", a song by Taj Mahal from Dancing the Blues, 1993

== See also ==
- "Her Strut", a 1980 song by Bob Seger
- Strutt, a surname
- Strutter (disambiguation)
