= Balbus =

Balbus is Latin for "stammerer", and may refer to:

- Quintus Lucilius Balbus (fl. 100 BC), Stoic philosopher mentioned in the works of Cicero
- Marcus Atius Balbus, grandfather of the Roman emperor Augustus
- Lucius Cornelius Balbus (consul 40 BC)
- Lucius Cornelius Balbus (proconsul)
- Theatre of Balbus, built by Lucius Cornelius Balbus (proconsul)
- Johannes Balbus (died c. 1298), Italian lexicographer
- Steven Balbus, Savilian Professor of Astronomy, Oxford University
- Balbus, a character in The Apple Cart by George Bernard Shaw
- Balbus, a character in the Epistle to Dr Arbuthnot
- Mixophyes balbus, "Stuttering Frog" species
- ST Balbus, a Nigerian Government tugboat

== See also ==
- Baldus
- Bulbus (genus), a genus of predatory sea snails
- Stutter (disambiguation)
- Stammer (disambiguation)
