= Stahmer =

Stahmer is a German surname. Notable people with the surname include:

- David Stahmer (1927–1997), American politician from Nebraska
- Edgar Stahmer (1911–1996), German music educator
- Heinrich Georg Stahmer (1892–1978), German diplomat
- Klaus Hinrich Stahmer (born 1941), German composer and musicologist
- Ingrid Stahmer (1942–2020), German politician

See also

- Stamer
- Sthamer
- Starmer (surname)
- Stammer (disambiguation)
