= Beast in Black =

Finnish heavy metal band

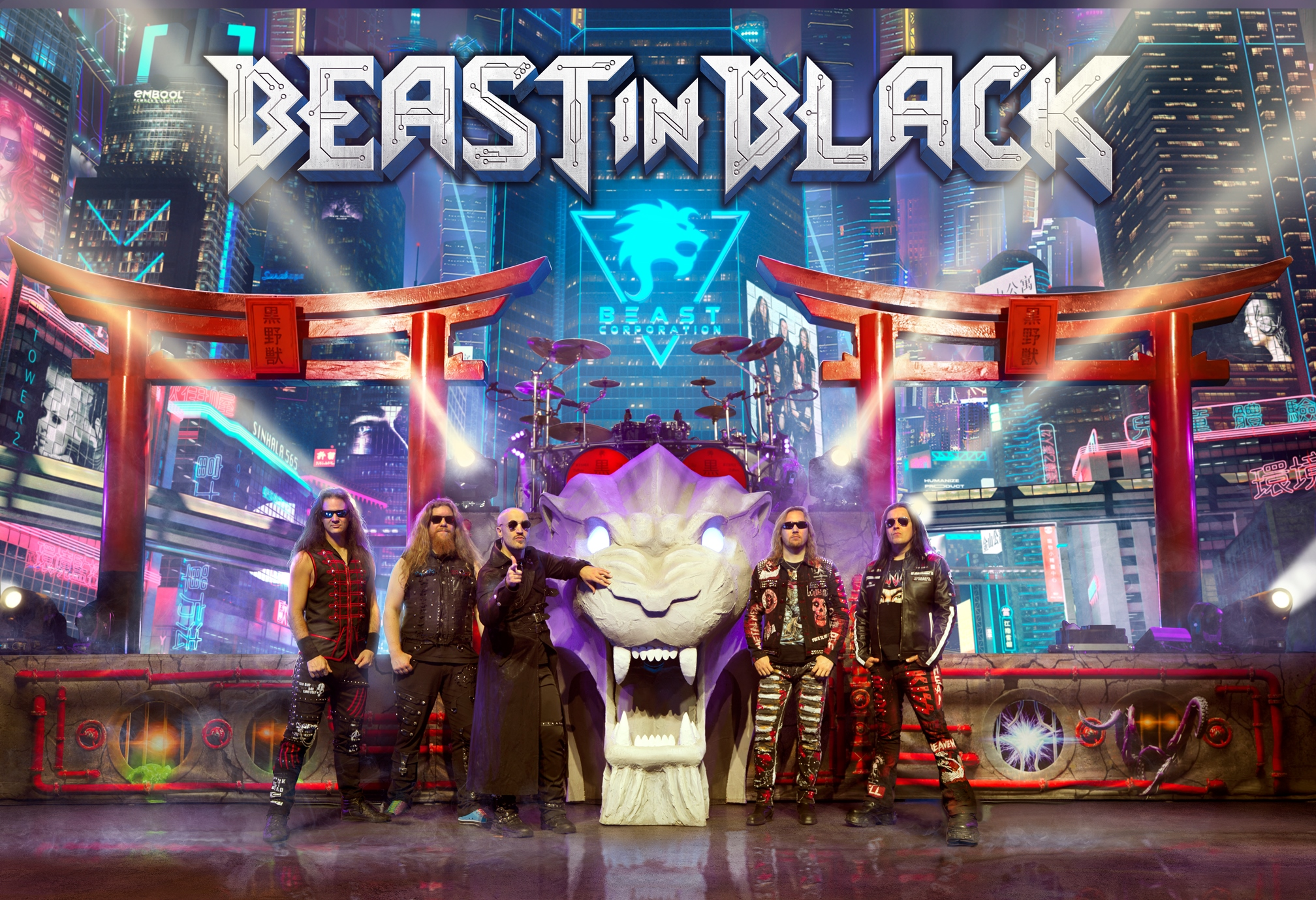
- Beast in Black in 2024

Background information
- Origin: Helsinki, Finland
- Genres: Heavy metal; power metal
- Works: Discography
- Years active: 2015–present
- Label: Nuclear Blast
- Spinoff of: Battle Beast
- Members: Anton Kabanen; Máté Molnár; Yannis Papadopoulos; Atte Palokangas; Markus Venehsalo
- Past members: Sami Hänninen; Kasperi Heikkinen
- Website: beastinblack.com

Beast in Black is a Finnish heavy metal band formed in Helsinki in 2015 by guitarist and songwriter Anton Kabanen. The band's blend of power metal, 80s pop, and electronic music, as well as their energetic live performances, have made them pioneers of their genre. Beast in Black's current lineup consists of guitarist, founding member and primary songwriter Anton Kabanen, guitarist Markus Venehsalo, bassist Máté Molnár, lead vocalist Yannis Papadopoulos and drummer Atte Palokangas. The band's original drummer Sami Hänninen left the band in 2017 because of the changing circumstances in his life, as well as issues related to the nerves in his left hand. Guitarist Kasperi Heikkinen left the band in 2025.

Beast in Black's debut studio album Berserker was released in November 2017 and achieved rapid success by getting certified Platinum by the IFPI. Their 2019 studio album From Hell with Love followed suit, earning a Platinum certification from IFPI and further increasing the band's popularity. Beast in Black's third studio album, Dark Connection, was released on 29 October 2021, and achieved Gold status. With the proven success of the band's three releases, Beast in Black has become one of the most successful Finland-based heavy metal bands. This was further solidified by the band's appearances at international music festivals including Graspop in 2019 and 2023, Hellfest in 2023 and Wacken Open Air in 2024.

To date, the band has released three studio albums, 13 singles and one video game. Their lyrics are inspired by topics such as the manga Berserk, relationships, literature, dark fantasy, science fiction and societal issues, while the band's mascot, the "Beast", appears in album art and live shows.

== History ==
=== 2015: Formation ===
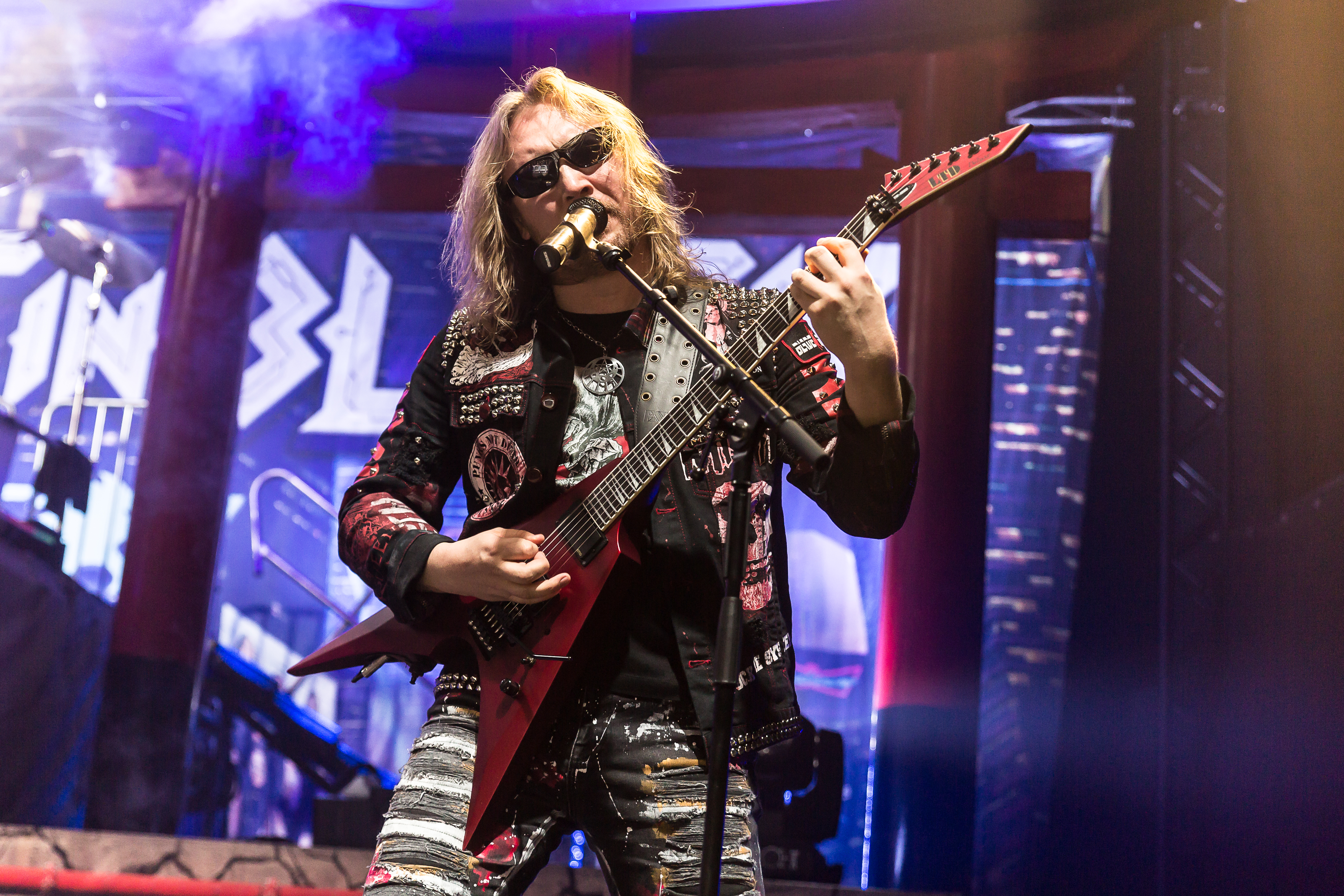
Band founder Anton Kabanen

Beast in Black was formed in Helsinki in 2015, when Finnish guitarist Anton Kabanen called several musicians with whom he had an affinity for a heavy metal band.

Kabanen and Finnish guitarist Kasperi Heikkinen met in 2010 when Battle Beast and Merging Flare (Heikkinen's band) were both supporting Blaze Bayley in Finland Back then they didn't initiate too much of a personal connection. However, it was at the end of 2013, when Battle Beast was supporting U.D.O. during their "Steelhammer" tour(Heikkinen had joined the ranks of U.D.O. earlier that year), when they found out that they both shared similar interests, influences, and opinions about music. When Kabanen's professional journey ended with Battle Beast, he asked Heikkinen to be a part of this new band.

In the early 2010s, Finnish drummer Sami Hänninen's band Brymir shared rehearsal facilities with Battle Beast, in which he met Kabanen. In 2011, Hänninen joined the Battle Beast tour in Central Europe as a driver, merchandiser, and a general one-man crew. After Kabanen left Battle Beast, Hänninen contacted him about other matters and Kabanen mentioned the possibility of founding a new band offering the drummer's spot to Hänninen.

Kabanen and Hungarian bass player Máté Molnár first met in the end of 2013 when Battle Beast and Wisdom (Molnár's band) were both supporting Powerwolf during their "Wolfsnächte" tour. The chemistry worked pretty well between them from the very first moment and they kept in touch after the tour as well. The two met again at the Hungarian show of Sabaton's "Heroes On Tour" tour, on 25 January 2015, for which Battle Beast was the opening act (Kabanen was still in the Battle Beast line-up). That was when Kabanen first talked about forming a new band, and Molnár offered his services. After that tour with Sabaton, on 15 February 2015, Kabanen and Battle Beast parted ways. A few weeks later Kabanen joined Wisdom and during these times they laid the foundation of a new band.

Kabanen contacted Greek vocalist Yannis Papadopoulos online in 2014, after discovering his YouTube channel and his band Wardrum. They met in Thessaloniki when Battle Beast played there with Sabaton, on 31 January 2015, six days after Kabanen met Molnár in Hungary, during the same tour. This meeting laid the groundwork for Beast in Black, since Kabanen and Papadopoulos talked about all future plans, arrangements, and established Papadopoulos as the final band member.

The first appearance of the group was a Facebook post on 5 September 2015, with a simple but mysterious announcement, "The Beast is back!". Beast in Black was formed on 8 October 2015, when Kabanen, Molnár, Papadopoulos, Heikkinen, and Hänninen met each other in a small pub in Helsinki. That day, the band first convened in person.

Kabanen picked the name Beast in Black. After leaving Battle Beast, he wanted to continue using the Beast character that he created around 2005-2006. He took a character, The Black Swordsman from Berserk, the Japanese manga-anime, and combined it with his inner demon, the Beast of Darkness, which turned out to be Beast in Black.

=== 2015–2018: Early years, drummer change and Berserker ===
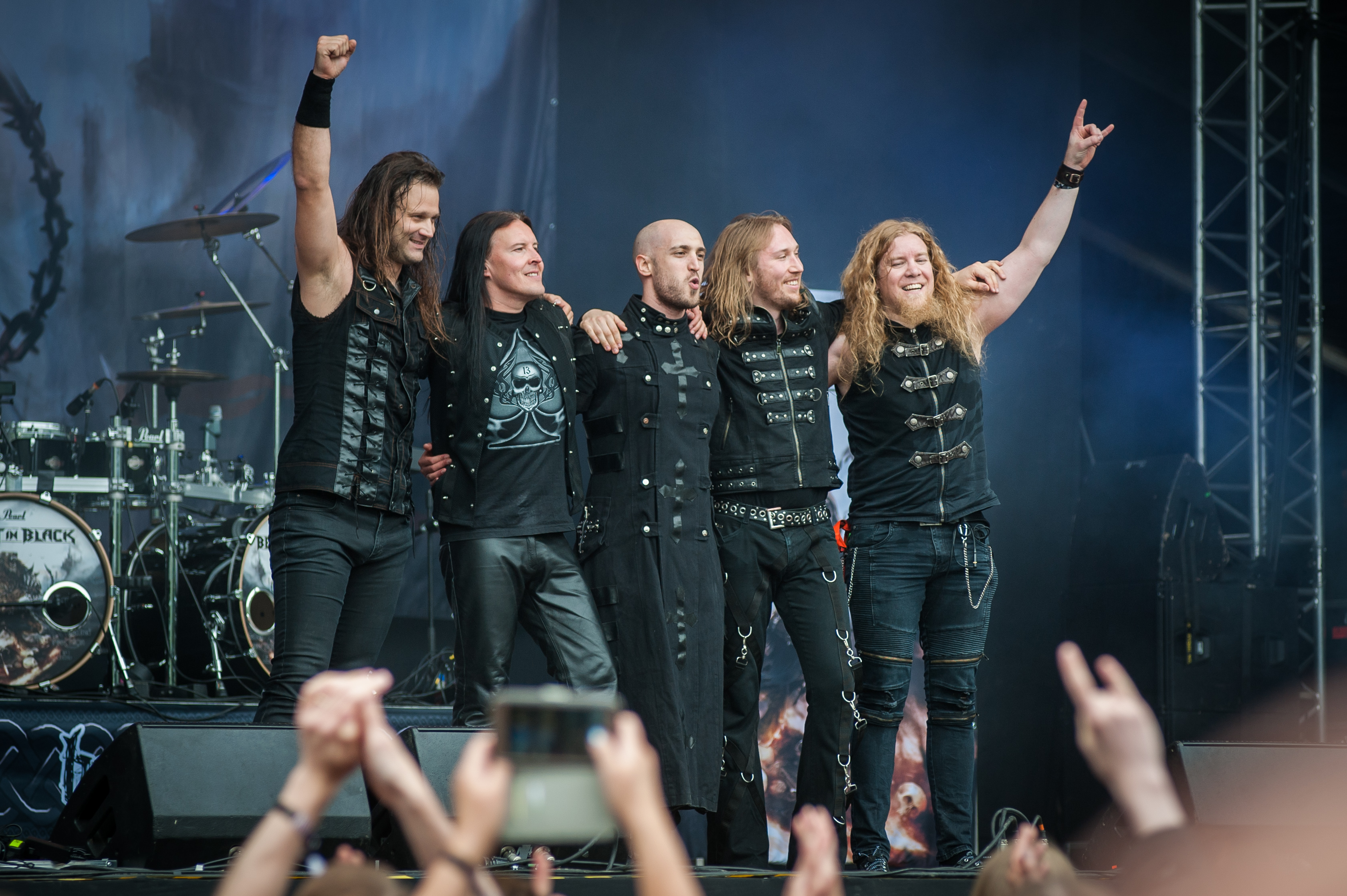
Beast in Black after their performance at South Park Festival in 2018

The first band meeting had another purpose, too; from the next day they started to rehearse for the debut Beast in Black concert. They were the supporting act for Nightwish in front of 8000 people in Espoo Metro Areena, during their Endless Forms Most Beautiful tour, on 13 November 2015 . Heikkinen couldn't participate in this event because of his duties with U.D.O., and the band performed as a four-piece. They played Battle Beast songs that Kabanen composed, and two songs ("Go To Hell" and "End Of The World"), which later became parts of their debut album, Berserker. To date, "End Of The World" is the only song which has been performed at every single headlining Beast in Black show. After their performance, they received an invitation to be the opening act of an event with Sabaton, Stratovarius and Gamma Ray. The concert has also been held in Espoo Metro Areena, on 19 December 2015. Before the band released Berserker, they played three shows in total; these two arena concerts and the legendary Tuska Festival, which was the only Beast in Black concert in 2016.

Due to the band members' past bands and significant successes, Beast in Black was on the radar of several record companies, well before the release of their debut album. On 31 August 2017, they signed a worldwide record deal with Nuclear Blast Records, which came together with the announcement of the release of their debut album Berserker, which arrived in November of the same year.

The band revealed the album's lead single "Blind And Frozen", on 8 September 2017. The music video was directed by Ville Lipiäinen, who had worked with bands like Nightwish, Pain and Stratovarius in the past. The success of the song and the music video brought a management contract to the table with Till Dawn They Count Management, who were unofficially working with the band since their initial formation. After the record and management deal, they signed to Contra Promotion booking agency to take care of their concert bookings all over Europe, except for Finland, where they signed with Fullsteam booking agency.

The second single, "Beast in Black", came out as a lyric video on 13 October 2017. This was the first official song from Beast in Black that drew its topic from Berserk, and it made clear to the audience that Kabanen would write songs as he had with Battle Beast.

In the meantime, the group's activity grew, which brought Hänninen to a hard decision. He didn't want to hold the band's progression back; therefore, citing health issues and changes in his life circumstances, he announced his departure. The rest of the band had to find his replacement for a tour they would start in a few weeks. Amongst the suggested drummers, Atte Palokangas was the one whose abilities and availability matched the band's expectations, and he was recruited for the tour.

To present their debut album live on stage, the band joined W.A.S.P. on their "Re-Idolized: The 25th Anniversary of The Crimson Idol" tour, which kicked off one week before the release of Berserker, on 28 October 2017. However, the tour didn't last long for them. Beast in Black stated that they did not get the treatment they were guaranteed, and after four shows they quit the tour on 2 November 2017.

On 3 November 2017, Beast in Black released their debut album, Berserker, which was also produced by Kabanen. On the same day, they revealed a lyric video for the song "Born Again", as the album's third single. Berserker reached the 7th position on the Finnish charts, while it charted in a considerable number of other countries as well,.

After the tour with W.A.S.P. ended, they earned another chance for the live presentation of Berserker. Beyond the Black invited Beast in Black, along with Kobra and the Lotus, to support them on nine shows in Germany on their "Lost In Forever" tour. The tour started on 7 December 2017, and introduced the band to the German fans. On 22 December 2017, the band launched another Berserk-related lyric video, for their track entitled "Zodd The Immortal". This was the fourth single from band's debut studio album Berserker.

On 7 February 2018 and after having toured with the band since the end of 2017, Atte Palokangas was officially announced as the new drummer for Beast in Black. In the meantime, the band had the chance to be the main support for Rhapsody Of Fire, for their "20th Anniversary Farewell" tour. Before their tour kicked off, they headlined three shows in Finland, all of which sold out. One of them was the legendary Radio Rock Cruise, which was organized by Radio Rock, the main rock radio station in Finland. After this point, Radio Rock started playing Beast in Black songs in high rotation on their channel. This made the band prominent in Finland. On 17 February 2018, Heikkinen parted ways with U.D.O. This allowed him to focus on Beast in Black. On the same day, the tour with Rhapsody Of Fire started in Bologna, Italy. This five-week-long tour became the band's first intensive appearance in Europe.

Before the summer festival season, Beast in Black embarked on a short tour in Japan along with Turisas and S-Tool, called "Suomi Feast 2018". This was the first time the band played outside Europe. The intense touring resulted in some major festival invitations, like Nova Rock Festival, Tuska Festival and Sabaton Open Air. The culmination to the above was Beast in Black's nomination for the Metal Hammer Awards 2018 in the "Best Debut Album" category.

=== 2018–2020: From Hell with Love ===
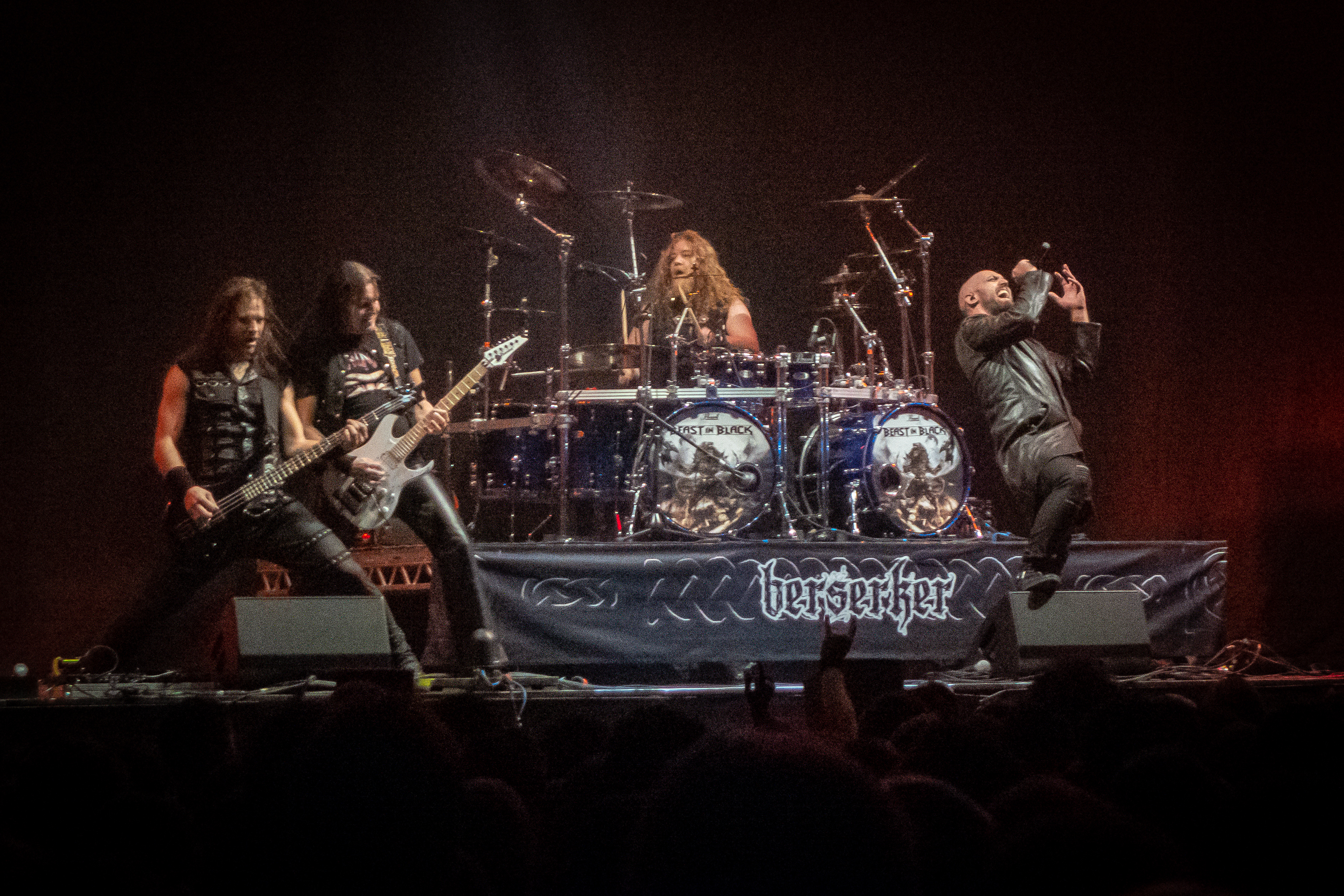
Beast in Black performing in Geneve, 2018

From 2 November – 15 December 2018, the band began their first major touring cycle as the main supporting act on Nightwish's Decades: World Tour. This six-week-long arena tour around Europe introduced Beast in Black to thousands of people every night. Their full set was based on the Berserker album, while they also used this tour to promote their second album, slated for release in the beginning of 2019. During the tour, they revealed the cover artwork with its title From Hell with Love, and released the album's lead single, "Sweet True Lies", as a music video on 30 November 2018.

On 11 January 2019, the lyric video for "Die By the Blade" was released. This Berserk-related track, and Kabanen's statements made Berserk fans sure that some songs of the new record would continue dealing with this manga. The second Beast in Black album, From Hell with Love, came out on 8 February 2019, again via Nuclear Blast Records. It topped the Finnish charts and reached good positions in several European countries. The record included a cover version of Motörhead's "Killed By Death", out of respect for Lemmy Kilmister, who died around the time Beast in Black was founded back in 2015. The album was followed by the music video for the title song, "From Hell with Love", released on Valentine's Day 2019.

On 20 February 2019, the band embarked on its first European headlining tour with support from Turmion Kätilöt, playing to average crowds of 1,000 people. The "From Hell with Love" tour included an extensive Finnish leg with 16 shows, which they did without any supporting acts. 21 shows of the total 31 were sold out, which encouraged the band to expand their wings to other European countries and cities too. The continuation of the "From Hell with Love" tour was announced on 19 May 2019 with Myrath as support.

The band had a short headlining run called "Suomi Feast" in Japan in May 2019. The success of these three concerts made them return to Tokyo within four months to play two shows at "Metal Weekend" along with Loudness, HammerFall, and Myrath. During the summer they hit the stages of prominent festivals like Sweden Rock Festival, Graspop Metal Meeting, and Heavy Montreal, which was the band's first appearance in North America. In the beginning of September, Beast in Black took their first trip to Russia for two headlining shows, in St Petersburg and Moscow.

The band went on their first tour in the UK and Ireland for two weeks, as special guest for Gloryhammer on their "Intergalactic Terrortour", on 18 October 2019. Kabanen got sick at the end of the tour and he couldn't perform on the last three shows. The band had to play these concerts as a four-piece. The second leg of the "From Hell with Love" tour started right after the tour in UK and Ireland, with a total of 19 shows across Europe. The last concert was an event called "Beast in Black Friday" with Lordi on board as very special guests. To support this show, Beast in Black released a music video for "Cry Out For A Hero" on 3 December 2019. "Beast in Black Friday" took place in Helsinki Ice Hall, in front of 5,000 fans, on 13 December 2019. This was the first time the band used massive stage decorations and pyro effects, as well as a huge Beast head prop in front of the drum riser.

The band had several plans for 2020. They announced their first show in Latin America at Domination MX festival, Mexico, a short run with Nightwish in Russia, Ukraine, and Belarus, and their first tour in North America, supporting Hammerfall. All those shows were postponed or cancelled due to the COVID-19 pandemic.

=== 2021–2024: Dark Connection ===
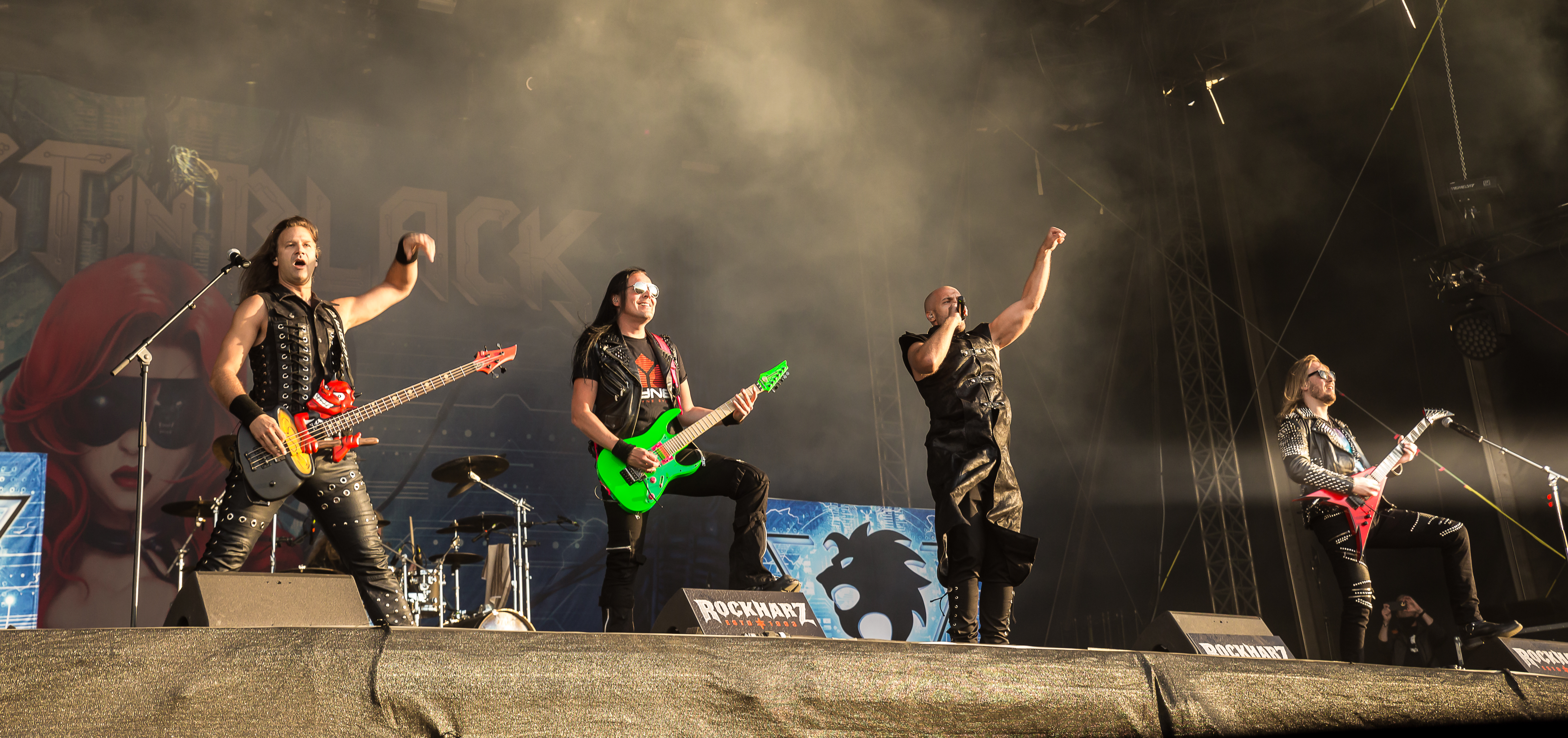
Beast in Black performing at Rockharz in 2022

On 20 August 2021, Beast in Black announced the release date of their third studio album, Dark Connection. At the same time, they revealed its cover artwork as well as its cyberpunk-driven lyrical influences like Armitage III, Cyber City Oedo 808, AD Police Files, Battle Angel Alita, Bubblegum Crisis, and Blade Runner.

The album's lead single, "Moonlight Rendezvous", came out as a music video on 3 September 2021. The video was a massive dark cyberpunk love story influenced by Blade Runner, the 1982 science fiction film directed by Ridley Scott, and it won the "Best Music Video of the Month" competition at Top Shorts Film Festival. Katri Ilona Koppanen was involved in the making of all previous Beast in Black music videos, but this was the first time she sat in the director's chair. After the huge success of "Moonlight Rendezvous", Koppanen directed several other music videos for the group, such as the animated "One Night In Tokyo", the second single from the album, revealed on 1 October 2021. This heavy metal hybrid of Italo disco and Eurobeat shocked some listeners, but it also helped the band engage with a wider audience.

On 29 October 2021, Beast in Black released their third album, Dark Connection. It debuted at number one on the Finnish charts and charted in several European countries. The album was dedicated to Kentaro Miura, the author of Berserk, who had died during the making of Dark Connection. Besides its cyberpunk influences, Berserk remained core element of the lyrics. In addition to eleven brand-new songs, the record contained covers of Manowar's "Battle Hymn" and Michael Jackson's "They Don't Care About Us".

Three days after the release of the album, the band revealed its third single. The music video for "Hardcore" was published on 1 November 2021. The video was inspired by the works of Hajime Sorayama and a raw cyberpunk anime of the '90s, AD Police Files: The Phantom Woman. Due to its explicit content, YouTube set an age restriction on it and required authentication before watching it, therefore the views never climbed as high as the band's other music videos.

On 8 November 2021, in collaboration with Marvin Advergames, Beast in Black released an arcade game called One Night In Tokyo. It was inspired by the most epic beat 'em up games like Streets of Rage and Final Fight, adapting them to the style of the "One Night In Tokyo" music video.

The first live performances of Dark Connection happened at four concerts in Finland, with Nestruction as the supporting act, in March 2022. This was followed by Beast in Black's first tour in North America, starting on 7 April 2022. It was named the "Dark Connection" tour, and the main support was provided by Seven Kingdoms, with additional support from Striker. However, one day before his departure to North America, Papadopoulos tested positive for COVID-19. As a result, he was not allowed to fly, and the band had to cancel the first three shows of the tour. Five days later, Papadopoulos joined the others in Dallas to perform the remaining 17 shows of the tour.

Two days after the last headlining concert in North America, they joined Nightwish as direct support on eleven shows during the North American leg of their Human. :II: Nature. World Tour.

On 6 May 2022, for the first anniversary of Kentaro Miura's death, the band released an animated lyric video for a Berserk-related song from Dark Connection, "Broken Survivors".

The summer of 2022 brought the band to several European festivals. They performed mostly on main stages, including major ones like Rockharz Open Air, Masters of Rock, and Summer Breeze Open Air.

Between 13–23 October 2022, Beast in Black visited Latin America for the first time as special guests on Nightwish's Human. :II: Nature. World Tour. They extended the series with two headlining shows in Argentina and Chile, completing a total of eight concerts there. They were then the special guests on the European leg of Nightwish's Human. :II: Nature. World Tour, from 20 November – 21 December 2022, with Turmion Kätilöt as an additional supporting act.

The music video for "Blade Runner" was released on 11 January 2023.

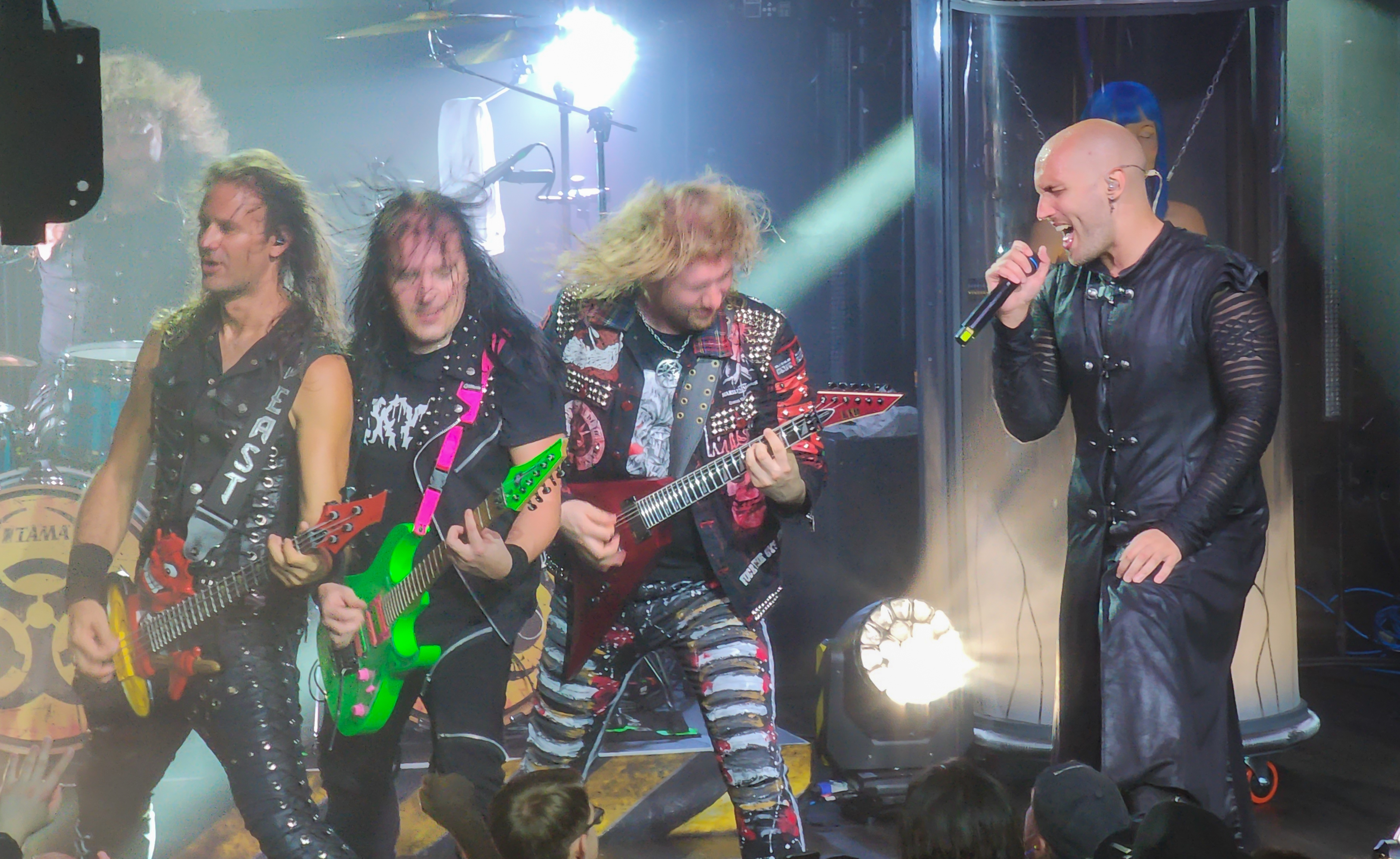
Beast in Black performing in Toronto, 2023

On 27 January 2023, Beast in Black embarked on their two-month-long "Dark Connection" European tour with Firewind as special guests. The tour had 44 dates through 21 countries and ended in Greece. This was the first time the band performed in Papadopoulos' home country, eight years after the band's foundation. To promote Dark Connection in Japan too, Beast in Black played two headlining shows in Tokyo in May 2023. The event was called "Two Nights in Tokyo".

On 7 June 2023, the band announced a double-headlining European tour together with Gloryhammer for early 2024. The Glory and the Beast tour was promoted as the biggest headlining tour in both bands' histories.

During the summer of 2023, they secured main stage slots at major European festivals like Hellfest and Leyendas del Rock and performed at two festivals outside Europe: Summer Breeze Brasil and ProgPower USA.

The "To The Last Drop Of Blood" music video came out on 24 August 2023.

From 9 September – 15 October 2023, Beast in Black returned to North America for a lap around the U.S. and Canada. The "Back In North America" tour was joined by special guests Dance with the Dead.

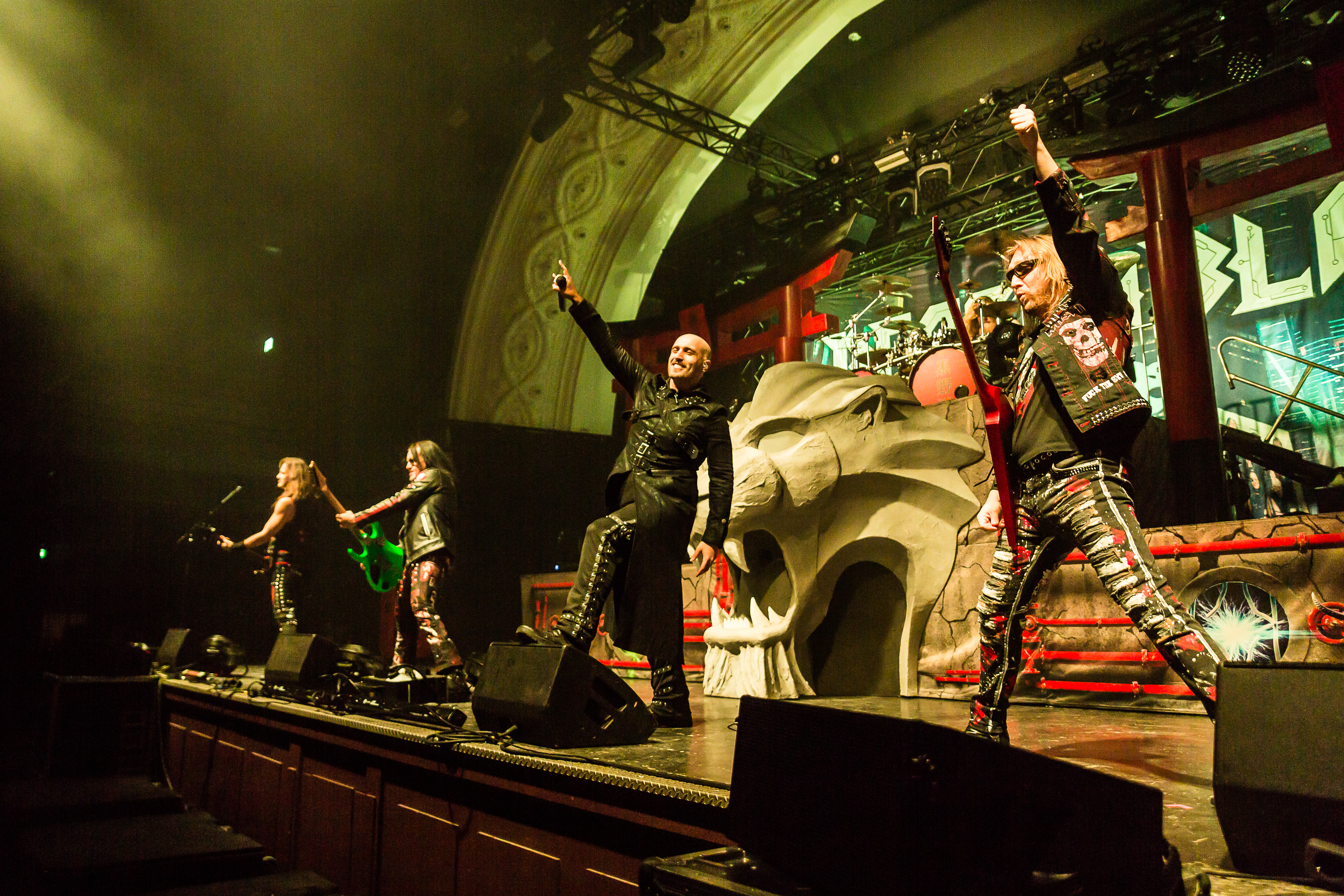
Beast in Black performing in Leipzig, 2024

The "Glory and the Beast" tour kicked off on 10 January 2024, with additional support from Brothers of Metal. The tour included 21 dates in major cities of 14 European countries, in venues with capacities between 2000–4000. Twelve of these shows were sold out, with an average crowd of 2,500. Both bands played equal sets and had a grandiose stage design. Five years after "Beast in Black Friday", the massive Beast head made its second appearance on stage. Beast in Black performed last on most shows, except for the final one in London, which was Gloryhammer's home city. The band returned to Japan for two concerts in Tokyo, in May 2024. On the event called "Two Nights for Love," Turmion Kätilöt was the supporting act.

As a result of the successful tours, Beast in Black rose through the ranks to main stage slots on all their summer festival performances in 2024, including shows at Wacken Open Air, Alcatraz, and Bloodstock Open Air.

Three years after the release of the latest Beast in Black album, the band announced a new standalone single, "Power Of The Beast". The song and the music video came out on 27 June 2024. Kabanen introduced the track as a hybrid based on "Berserk" and his own life view and experiences, and he called it the first Super Eurobeast song.

On 12 November 2024, Beast in Black announced they would be special guests for Helloween on their "40 years" anniversary tour in Europe during the autumn of 2025.

=== 2025–present: Heikkinen's departure and upcoming fourth studio album ===
On 28 April 2025, the band announced their collaboration with Blizzard Entertainment's action role-playing dungeon crawling game Diablo IV, and the iconic manga and anime series Berserk. This groundbreaking partnership between Blizzard and Berserk – the first non-Blizzard IP collab of the Diablo franchise, resulted in "Belial's Return", the eighth season of Diablo IV, and has been promoted with Beast in Black's single and music video, "Enter the Behelit".

On 13 October 2025, the band announced a headlining European tour for their upcoming fourth studio album in October and November 2026, with Sonata Arctica and Frozen Crown as support acts. The European tour was later promoted as the Resurrection Tour.

On 22 October 2025, during the tour with Helloween, Kasperi Heikkinen's departure from Beast in Black was announced. Guitarist Daniel Freyberg (Crownshift, ex-Children Of Bodom), was announced as fill in for the remainder of the tour. The band continued supporting Helloween on their North American tour from April to May 2026. In a statement on 7 April 2026, Kabanen stated that he would not attend the North American shows, choosing to sit out and focus on completing the fourth studio album. On 17 June 2026, Markus Venehsalo was announced as the band's new guitarist. On 10 September 2026, the band released the single and music video for "Fear the Beast", inspired by the 1979 film Alien. On 22 October 2026, the band released the single and music video for "Lost Children". A few days later, the band announced another headlining North American tour which is set to take place in February and March 2027, and joined by the support act Gloryhammer.

== Lyrical and musical style ==
Beast in Black's musical style has been described as heavy metal, dance metal, melodic metal and power metal. (Note: Musical styles: "heavy metal"; "dance metal"; "melodic metal"; "power metal") The band states their genre is heavy metal, which Kabanen explained to Blabbermouth, "I've always considered heavy metal as the richest and most liberating genre there is in the whole existence of music. You can go from the softest whisper, the slowest melody and the most ambient kind of a soundscape into fast and aggressive, loud, high-screaming and even growled vocals. All that is acceptable in heavy metal. All those dynamics are acceptable. Try to find another genre where you can have as much variety as in heavy metal... it's hard to do. That's why I don't bother if we're getting too close to pop, Eurobeat or symphonic or traditional metal or hard rock. That is heavy metal to me. That's the absolute musical freedom".

Kabanen, Beast in Black's primary songwriter, marked Judas Priest, Manowar, Black Sabbath, W.A.S.P., and Accept as his major influences. In an interview with Distorted Sound Magazine, Kabanen talked about his musical style: "Similarly, I want to create a Beast in Black sound that makes us instantly recognisable and that centres around simplicity and straightforwardness in the songs, even if there are many different 'spices' on top depending on structure and style".

He opened up about the band's sound to Blabbermouth: "When you make an album, everyone expects in metal and rock, okay, it sounds the same, production and sound-wise from beginning to end. But in my mind, why does it have to be so? I understand it may be easier, but what if other songs could have outrageously different sounds with guitars, drums and bass. Like in pop music, they do that. They use a lot of electronic backgrounds, programmed instruments. The first song can be totally different sounding than the second song of the album of the pop artist, but in metal and rock, it's always the same. It's not a bad thing, but I'm trying to think outside the box".

Kabanen revealed his 80s-oriented influences in songwriting to Dead Rhetoric: "Whatever comes natural is usually good- the stuff they play on the radio, lots of it is from the 80's. There is a reason for that- those songs stood the test of time. It means there are musical elements in those songs that speak to people regardless of what decade it is. They are evergreen - and people listen to Beast in Black thinking about the fact that there's something familiar and comfortable to that. There is also something fresh, and the freshness comes from combining those influences. It should be crafted carefully, and that comes with time. Songwriting is also a thing that you have to practice- you can't just decide one day even if you are a great musician that you are going to be a great songwriter. You have to practice that as well as you practice your instrument".

The band's lyrics deal with relationships, literature, dark fantasy, science fiction and society. Berserk particularly is the main influence on lyrics as a recurring element in average three to five songs on every album. Kabanen told The Metal Crypt: "Beast In Black's albums have always had three categories: Berserk/anime/manga, other fictional stories, and then those completely personal stories". In another interview with The Metal Crypt, he expressed his thoughts about his lyric writing principles: "I have always said that the purpose of art is to raise thoughts and questions among people so that everyone has a chance to interpret them the way they want. [...] In my opinion, it would kill some of the magic if I revealed too much of what my lyrics are all about. [...] It's always important to leave some room for people to make their own thoughts about something".

== Image and legacy ==
In 2006, visual artist Roman Ismailov and Anton Kabanen created a lion-man warrior. They didn't give any name to it and during the years it was called lion man, lion-like warrior and even Battle Beast. The character has an extensive background story, too; however, it has never been published. In the beginning, Kabanen used it in his first band, Battle Beast. When Beast in Black was founded, and started to use it as their mascot, they simply called it the Beast. Since then, the Beast has been an integral part of the stage and media image of the group. The character appears on all of their cover artwork, on most of their T-shirt designs, and on numerous stage decoration elements. In physical form, the Beast appeared on stage first in 2019, at the Helsinki-based event called "Beast in Black Friday". This 2.4-meter high and 260 kg heavy "Beast head" structure, created by Tommi Mähönen, was made by iron bars, sheet metal and structure paste. The eyes of the head can light up and it can exhale heavy smoke.

Beast in Black's distinct logo has adorned all of the band's releases since their 2017 debut studio album, Berserker. The typeface was designed by Kabanen and Molnár, and it received the final touches by Janne Peltonen. However, Peltonen's modifications were made only after the release of the first album. Therefore, Berserker was released with the old version of the logo, and only the reprints had the band's final logo.

Beast in Black tend to use stage decoration in their shows with pyro and other special visual effects. They often have synchronized moves and other choreography elements in their songs which add some theatrical flavour to their live performances.

== Band members ==
Beast in Black at Rockharz 2022

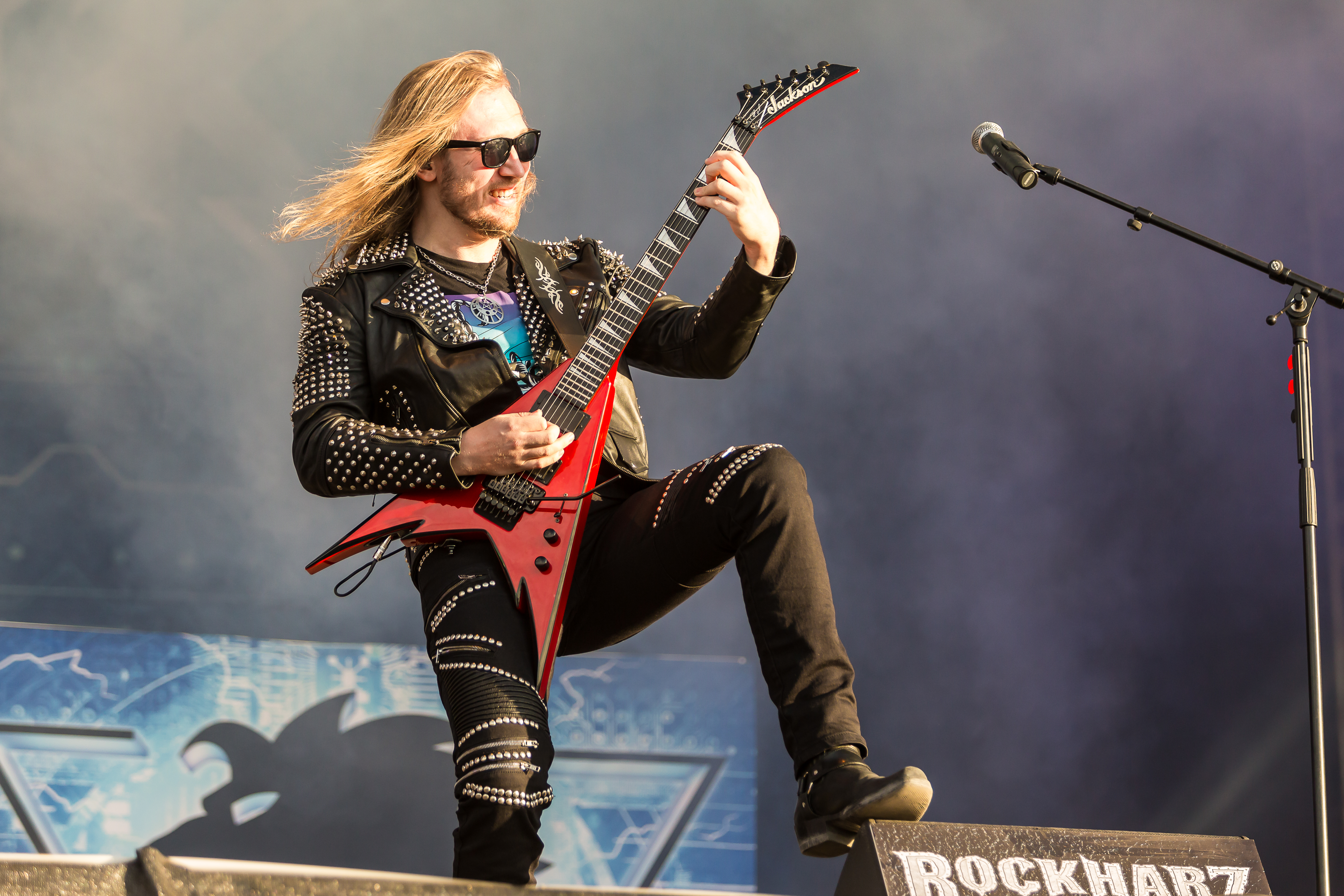
Anton Kabanen

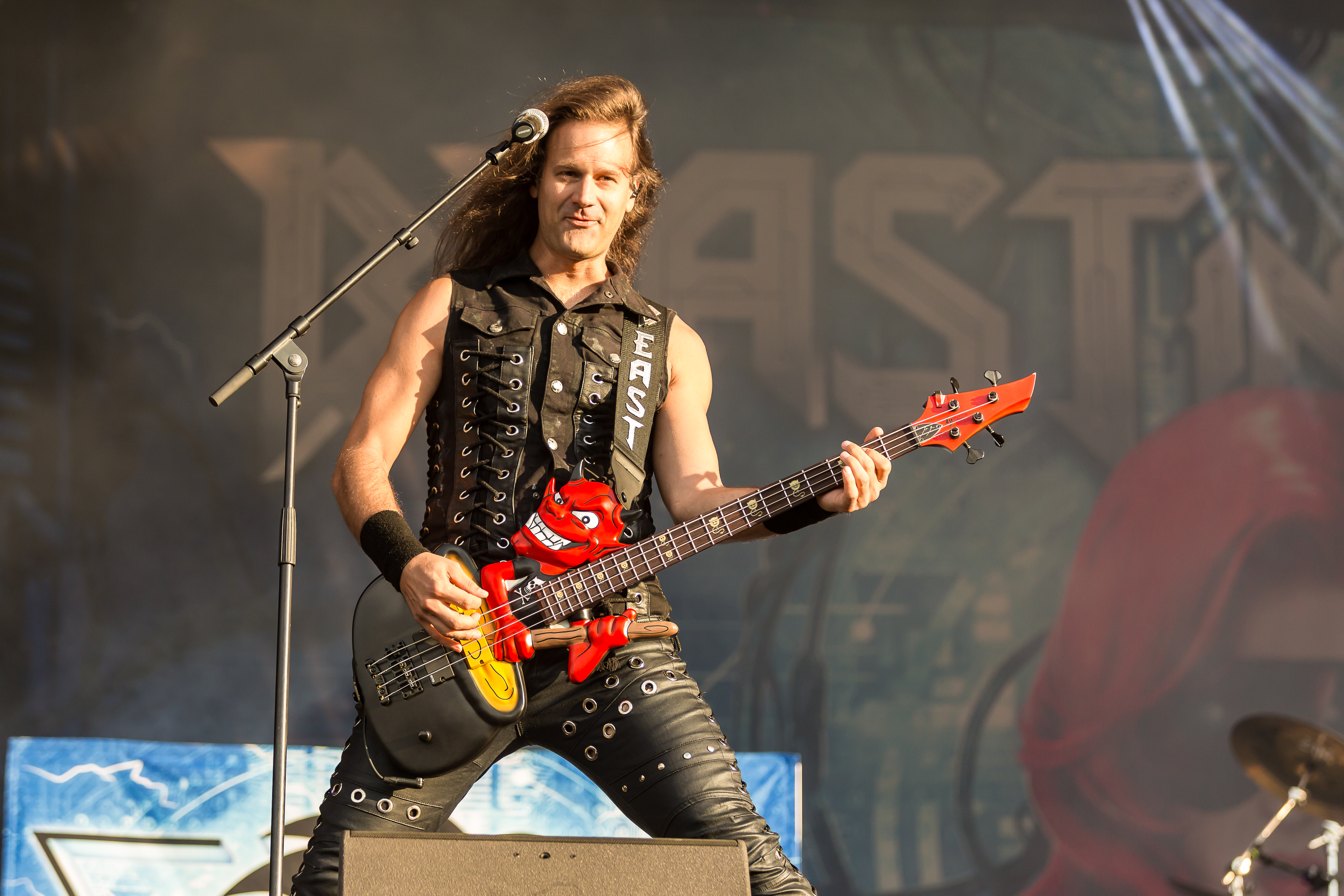
Máté Molnár

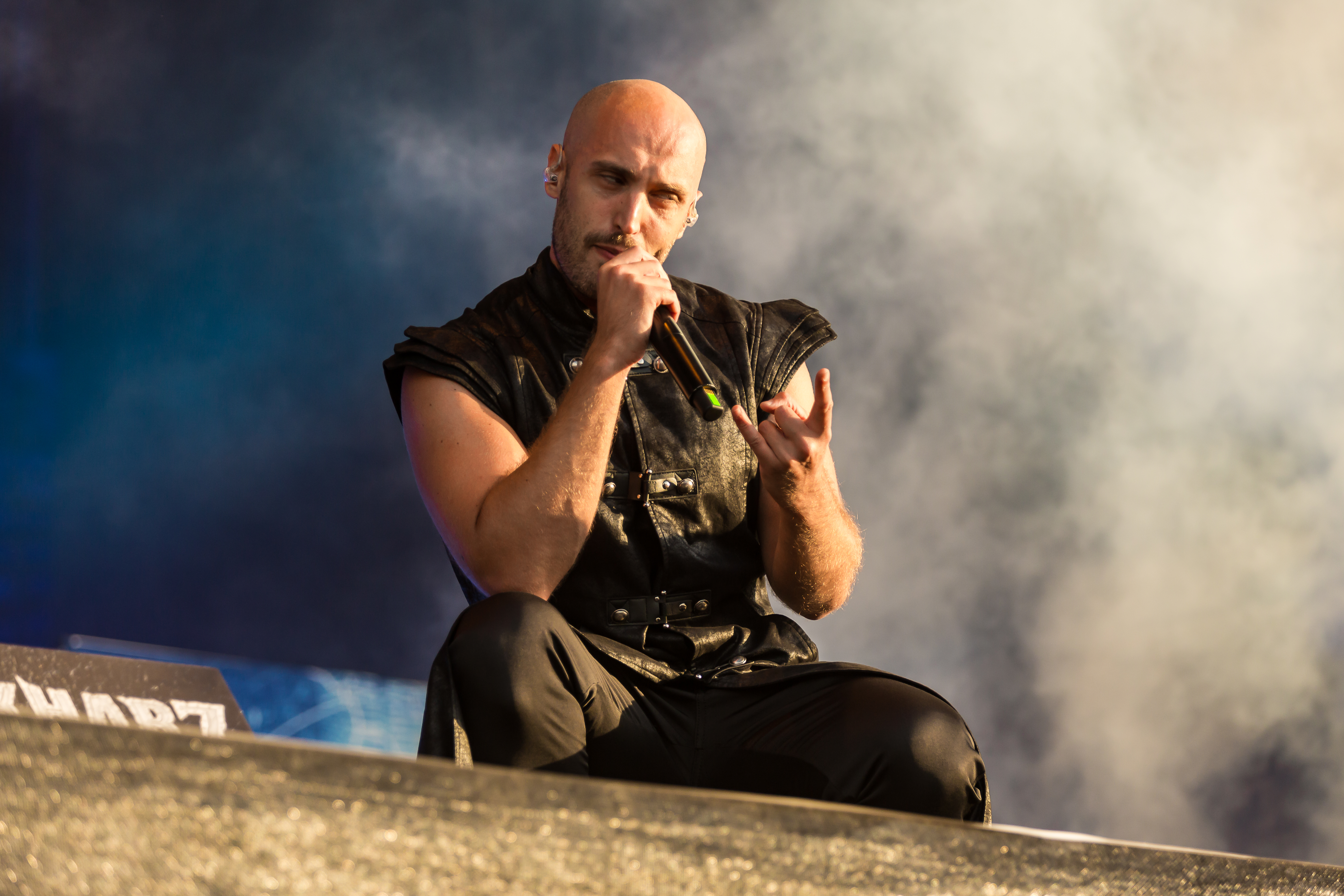
Yannis Papadopoulos

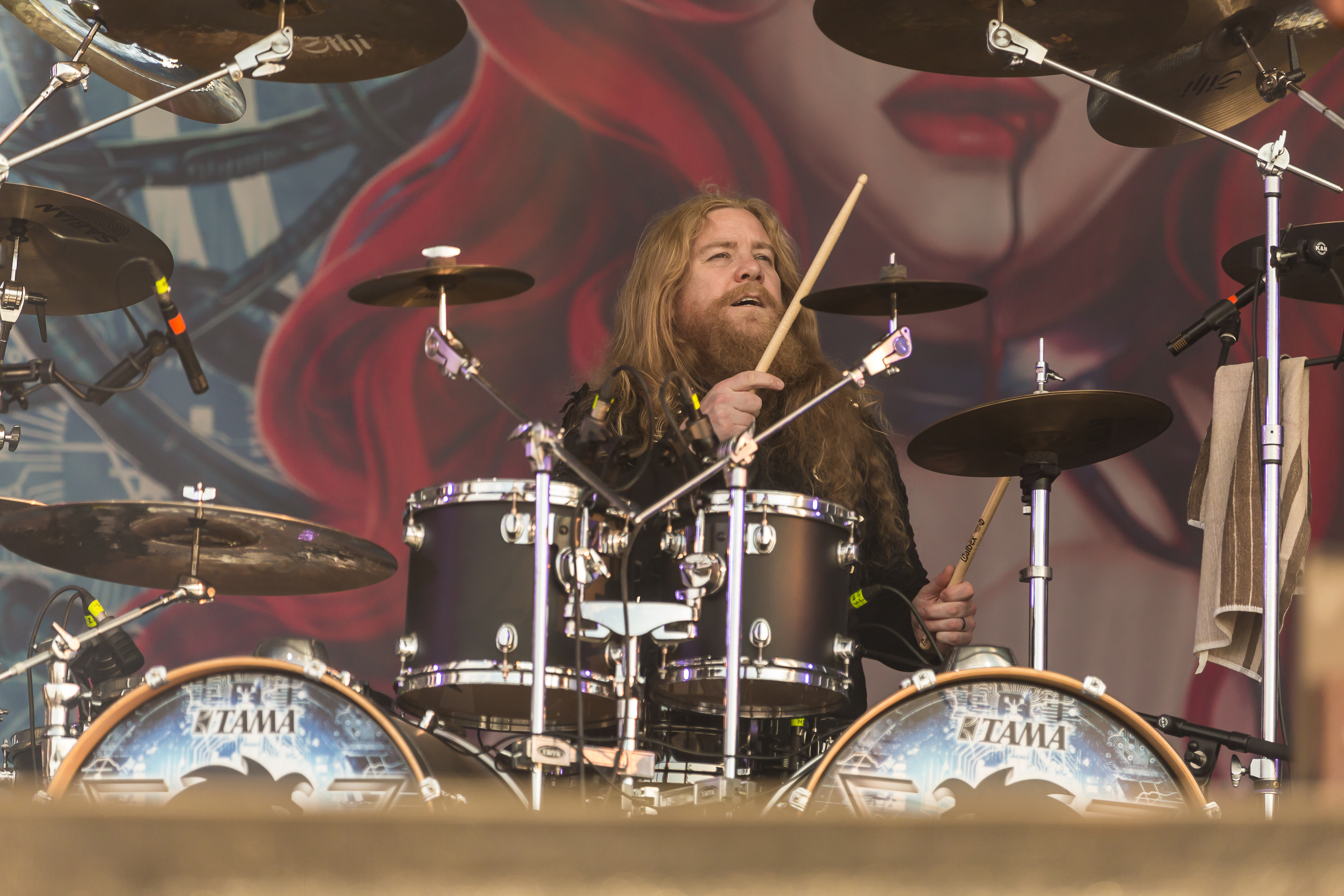
Atte Palokangas

=== Current ===
- Anton Kabanen – lead guitar, backing vocals, keyboards (2015–present)
- Máté Molnár – bass, backing vocals (2015–present)
- Yannis Papadopoulos – lead vocals (2015–present)
- Atte Palokangas – drums (2018–present)
- Markus Venehsalo – rhythm guitar (2026–present)

=== Former ===
- Sami Hänninen – drums (2015–2017)
- Kasperi Heikkinen – rhythm guitar (2015–2025)

=== Touring ===
- Daniel Freyberg – rhythm guitar (2025–2026)

== Discography ==
Studio albums:

- Berserker (2017)
- From Hell with Love (2019)
- Dark Connection (2021)

== Tours ==
Headlining tours

- Suomi Feast 2018
- From Hell with Love Tour (2019)
- Suomi Feast 2019
- Dark Connection Tour (2022–2023)
- Back in North America (2023)
- Glory and the Beast Tour (2024; co-headlining with Gloryhammer)
- Resurrection Tour (2026)
- North American Tour (2027)

As an opening act

- W.A.S.P. – Re-Idolized: The 25th Anniversary of The Crimson Idol (2017)
- Beyond the Black – Lost in Forever Tour (2017)
- Rhapsody – 20th Anniversary Farewell Tour (2018)
- Nightwish – Decades: World Tour (2018)
- Nightwish – Human. :II: Nature. World Tour (2022)
- Gloryhammer – Intergalactic Terrortour (2019)
- Helloween – 40 Years Anniversary Tour (2025–2026)

== Awards and nominations ==
Year	Work	Award	Category	Result
2018	Berserker	EMMA Awards	Metal of the Year	Nominated
2018	Berserker	Metal Hammer Awards	Best Debut Album	Nominated
2020	From Hell with Love	Music Moves Europe Talent Awards	Nominee	Nominated
2020	From Hell with Love	EMMA Awards	Best Metal Album	Nominated
2021	"Moonlight Rendezvous"	Top Shorts Film Festival	Best Music Video of the Month	Winner
2022	Beast in Black	EMMA Awards	Metal of the Year	Winner
2025	Beast in Black	Metal Awards	New Generation Metal	Winner
