= Stutter (disambiguation) =

A stutter, or stuttering is a speech disorder characterized by the spasmodic repetition of a sound.

Stutter or stuttering may also refer to:

== Music ==
- Stutter (album), a 1986 album by the band James
  - "Stutter", a 1989 song by James from One Man Clapping
- "Stutter" (Elastica song), a 1993 song by Britpop group Elastica
- "Stutter" (Joe song), a 2000 song by American R&B singer Joe
- "Stutter" (Maroon 5 song), a 2010 song by Maroon 5 from Hands All Over
- Stutter edit, a technique employed by musicians like BT
- "Stutter Rap" (No Sleep Til Bedtime), a 1988 song by Morris Minor and the Majors
- "Stuttering (Don't Say)", a 2001 song by Wild Orchid
- "Stuttering" (Fefe Dobson song), a 2010 single from Joy

== Other ==
- Stutter (display), unsmooth motion on displays
- Stutterer (film), a 2015 short film
- Stuttering equivalence, a relation in theoretical computer science
- Stutter step in tennis
- Stuttering Frog, Mixophyes balbus
- "Stuttering John" Melendez (born 1965), media personality

== See also ==
- Balbus (disambiguation)
- Stammer (disambiguation)
