= Starner =

Starner is a surname. Notable people with the surname include:

- Shelby Starner (1984–2003), American singer-songwriter and musician
- Stu Starner (1943-2024), American college basketball coach
- Thad Starner, American academic

== See also ==
- Starmer (surname)
