= Elenium (band) =

Finnish death metal band

Elenium is a Finnish melodic death metal band. They became known for their debut album For Giving – For Getting in 2003, and also released Caught in a Wheel in 2007.

The band was founded in 1995 in Vantaa. On back of the 2002 demo Them Used Gods, Elenium was signed by Eenglish label Rage Of Achilles. Jukka Pelkonen also became the singer of Omnium Gatherum, and guitarists Kasperi Heikkinen and Tommi Leinonen left in 2007; Heikkinen joined several large bands abroad.

== Discography ==
- For Giving – For Getting (2003)
- Caught in a Wheel (2007)
