= Armitage III =

1995 cyberpunk original video animation series

- Cover art for Funimation's 2013 DVD release of the OVAs and films

アミテージ・ザ・サード (Amitēji za Sādo)
- Genre: Action, cyberpunk
- Original video animation
- Directed by: Hiroyuki Ochi
- Produced by: Hiroaki Inoue; Kazuaki Morijiri; Yasuo Hasegawa
- Written by: Chiaki J. Konaka
- Music by: Hiroyuki Namba
- Studio: AIC
- Licensed by: AUS: Universal/Sony; NA: Crunchyroll
- Released: February 25, 1995 – November 25, 1995
- Runtime: 28–47 minutes (each)
- Episodes: 4
- Manga
- Written by: Zarae Otana; Tatsuya Ikegami
- Illustrated by: Hiroyuki Ochi
- Published by: Tokuma Shoten
- Magazine: Monthly Shōnen Captain
- Original run: February 1995 – November 1995
- Volumes: 2
- Anime film

Armitage III: Poly-Matrix
- Directed by: Hiroyuki Ochi
- Produced by: Hiroaki Inoue; Kazuaki Morijiri; Yasuo Hasegawa
- Written by: Chiaki J. Konaka
- Music by: Hiroyuki Namba
- Studio: AIC
- Licensed by: AUS: Universal/Sony; NA: Crunchyroll
- Released: 1997
- Runtime: 90 minutes
- Anime film

Armitage: Dual-Matrix
- Directed by: Katsuhito Akiyama
- Produced by: Hideki Gotō; Hiroe Tsukamoto; Hisao Fuke; Kōhei Kawase; Satoru Yoshida; Yasuo Hasegawa
- Written by: Nahoko Hasegawa; Hideki Kakinuma; Satoshi Wada
- Music by: Julian Mack
- Studio: AIC
- Licensed by: AUS: Universal/Sony; NA: Crunchyroll
- Released: March 22, 2002
- Runtime: 90 minutes
- icon

Armitage III (アミテージ・ザ・サード, Amitēji Za Sādo) is a 1995 cyberpunk original video animation series. It centers on Naomi Armitage, a highly advanced "Type-III" android. In 1996, the series was edited into a film called Armitage III: Poly-Matrix (アミテージ POLY-MATRIX(ポリマトリックス), Amitēji Pori Matorikkusu).

The series was followed up in 2002 with a sequel, Armitage: Dual-Matrix (アミテージ DUAL-MATRIX(デューアルマトリックス)) set some years after the original story.

== Plot ==
=== Armitage III and Poly-Matrix ===
In 2046, the overpopulation of Earth has led to the colonization of Mars. Using "first type" androids, humans began terraforming the unfriendly environment of Mars and built the city of Saint Lowell. Some time after the start of colonization, the city was completed and inhabited with humans and "Second type" robots (improved versions of the "First types"). Ross Sylibus, a middle-aged policeman from Chicago, travels to Saint Lowell to meet his new partner Naomi Armitage. He joined the Martian Police Department to escape his past trauma of his previous partner being killed by a robot.

As Ross exits the shuttle, he bumps into a mysterious man with a big suitcase and two robotic guards, and Armitage orders the men to stop. Ross notices a few drops of blood spilling from the mysterious man's suitcase. The two robot guards are killed by Armitage and the mysterious man is wounded, but flees. However, he leaves his suitcase behind—inside of which is the dead body of country music singer Kelly McCanon. To everybody's surprise and horror, McCanon turns out to be a robot: a new, never-seen-before "Third type" android that is superficially identical to humans.

Later, the mysterious man hacks into the public television system and replays the security camera footage. The tape shows the man killing Kelly McCanon and reveals the fact of her being a robot to the entire city. The mysterious man, René D'anclaude, reveals that the Third types have been among the regular people for a long time and nobody can tell them apart from humans. He also reveals a list of Thirds—and it turns out that a lot of well-known people are actually robots. Riots begin in the city as people start to capture and burn all the Thirds they can find. Meanwhile, René D'anclaude proceeds with his extermination of the Thirds. The two main characters start their investigation and eventually realize that the victims are women.

One of the dying victims, Jessica Manning, sends out a message with the list of Thirds to save them from being slaughtered. Armitage receives it and pursues D'anclaude. Armitage is eventually revealed to be a third and goes into hiding as the police hunt for her. Ross seeks her out as she enlists the help of a male third named Julian Moore. D'anclaude then attacks them and is revealed to be a second.

While the police drop the case with D'anclaude's supposed capture, Armitage and Julian search a databank for information on her origins. Armitage eventually defeats D'anclaude, but is too late to stop Julian from being killed. She and Ross break into the hospital D'anclaude was recovering in, branding themselves as criminals after the rescue.

Armitage and Ross later go off in search of her "father", Dr. Asakura, only to learn he had lost his mind, as explained by a gentler, reprogrammed version of D'anclaude, living with delusions of creating "Fourths". They learn that the Thirds were originally "assassinroids" - deadly robots with organic components, capable of infiltrating secure facilities by masquerading as humans. This project was re-purposed to bolster the low Martian birth rate, itself a result of Earth's strongly feminist society encouraging the immigration of males and discouraging the immigration of females. However, Earth's discovery of the Thirds incensed its leadership, forcing Mars to reverse its plans; Earth demanded that the Thirds be annihilated, offering female immigrants as a reward - and threatening war if not obeyed. The assassinroid program was thus re-activated to hunt and destroy the Thirds, which had vanished into the Martian population after their creation.

These revelations shock and dismay Armitage, leading her to seek comfort in Ross, who affirms her value as a living being before consummating their relationship. The next day, after Asakura deactivates Armitage so he can install angelical wings and particle cannons on her chassis, the military kills Asakura, and Armitage and Ross eventually finish off the military. Months later, Ross returns to Mars, using false IDs, however Armitage throws hers away after Ross Sylibus' arrival. Armitage tells Ross that she is pregnant with their child.

=== Dual-Matrix ===
It had been several years since the events of the previous OVA. Naomi Armitage and Ross Sylibus, now living under assumed identities, are living in St. Lowell on Mars, along with their daughter Yoko. Ross now works for a company seeking to restore oceans to Mars by using ice asteroids. However, a new effort to restore the Third project prompts Naomi to travel to Earth to figure out what is happening. Meanwhile, Ross saves a facility from a group of terrorists and is declared a Martian hero.

When Armitage arrives on Earth, she confronts Colonel Strings, hero of the First Error, which was a suppression of a robot uprising, which in reality, was to cover up the existence of the Thirds. But then he is shot by agents of an Earth Robotronics Corporation. Its vice president, Demetrio Mardini, asks Armitage to give the data on how Thirds can conceive so humanity can create a race of beings who exist to serve. She refuses so he resorts to force and unleashes a robot that scrambles her eyes. She manages to use her telepresence abilities to hack into its system and overload it. She then escapes but is damaged and is found by a repairer third named Mouse, who prides himself on his skill and frequently brags that he's a "genius". However, Mouse is also an informant to Demetrio and presents the data he found on Armitage; but he only got the recent data and Demetrio wants the conception data. Mouse claims that he did not know about the conception data, and also that if it existed it would be with what he gave him; but Demetrio refuses to believe either of these and tries to brutally force it with two clones of Armitage, who severely injure Mouse. He does not get anything and throws Mouse in the trash. Mouse swears revenge.

Back on Mars, prime minister Fredrick O'Hara sends Ross to Earth to represent the planet in the support of robot rights, promising amnesty from the charges against them. However, Demetrio's agents captured Yoko while Ross was away from the hotel, and is threatened that he will not see Yoko again if he votes for the Rights Bill. With a little reluctance, Ross remains neutral on the bill. Demetrio's agents, however, reveal that they were planning on killing Ross from the start, contrary to their deal. After a car chase, Armitage is able to save him at the very last moment. Together, they vow to rescue their daughter.

They storm Demetrio's compound; Armitage deals with Demetrio while Ross saves Yoko. The same robot Armitage encountered earlier had been upgraded to withstand her telepresence attack. Meanwhile, Ross manages to locate Yoko in a freezer. Elsewhere, Demetrio demands the secret in exchange for forgetting the damages they committed against him and his company. Armitage lures him closer, presumably to tell him what he wants to know; but she ends up kicking him in the crotch and telling him that Third conception is not simply data, it is about true love. With that she escapes again, forcing Demetrio to unleash the clones on her. She manages to evade the two and meets up with Ross and Yoko. Yoko is overjoyed to see her mother but recoils when she sees Armitage's metal shoulder that was scraped off by the clones. Just then, they attack. While Armitage holds them off, Ross and Yoko make their way to an unused space elevator. It is here that Yoko shows that she has a photographic memory, leading them to the space elevator whose location she determined from a map she saw minutes beforehand (Ross comments that she is "quite a genius"). Soon, Armitage flees to Mouse, who repairs the damage and gives her a program that will allow her to go beyond her limited fighting abilities. He tells her that the password is "Heaven's Door"; but that if she exceeds more than her internal battery can handle, she will "be knocking at the Pearly Gates for real". She also has him do her one more favor: broadcast the footage of the Third massacre attempts all over Earth and Mars. This compels Demetrio to command the clones to prevent the family from leaving. After both clones are beaten, Demetrio tries having the elevator's defenses fired on their shuttle only to be killed by the last remaining clone, who is at the time controlled by what was left of Poly-Matrix's Julian Moore. Without Demetrio's authorization, the turrets do nothing. A hologram of Julian Moore then appears, wishing the family goodbye. The movie ends with the family enjoying a day at the beach on Mars, on Naomi's birthday.

In a post-credits scene, Mouse salvages one of the Armitage clones for himself.

== Characters ==
=== Main characters ===
Naomi Armitage (ナオミ・アミテージ, Naomi Amitēji)
Voiced by: Hiroko Kasahara (OVA), Ryoka Yuzuki (Dual-Matrix) (Japanese); Joyce Kurtz (OVA), Elizabeth Berkley (Poly-Matrix), Juliette Lewis (Dual-Matrix) (English)
Naomi Armitage is an illegal "Third type" android—the most human-like robot ever. Armitage's creator is Dr. Asakura, whom she refers to as "papa". Armitage becomes Ross Syllabus' partner when he joins the Mars Police Department. She and Ross ultimately fall in love. Although she is simply called Armitage by most of the other characters, including Ross in Poly-Matrix, Ross mostly calls her Naomi in Dual-Matrix.
Ross Sylibus (ロス・シリバス, Rosu Shiribasu)
Voiced by: Yasunori Masutani (OVA), Hikaru Hanada (Dual-Matrix) (Japanese); Skip Stellrecht (OVA, Dual-Matrix), Kiefer Sutherland (Poly-Matrix) (English)
A police officer who transferred to the Mars Police Department from Earth's Chicago Police Department after an incident with a robot that left him crippled and his partner dead. He is only able to walk using a cybernetic leg. This incident is the cause for his disdain of robots. During his assignments with Armitage, he loses his arm as well, requiring another replacement cybernetic limb to be put in place. This causes him some grief, as he is slowly becoming what he hates the most. He soon falls in love with his new partner Naomi, and becomes a renegade cop in order to help her. Years later, he changed his name to Kevin Oldman and lives with Armitage and their daughter, Yoko.

=== Supporting characters ===
Dr. Asakura (アサクラ)
Voiced by: Shunsuke Shima (Japanese); Barry Stigler (English)
Dr. Asakura is an artificial intelligence researcher and, along with René D'anclaude, the creator of the thirds. Naomi considers him her father. At some point in the past, Asakura's mind was altered–this causes him to appear really crazy at times and prone to violent outbursts, when at other times, he is completely sane and rational. Realizing that the government has tracked Armitage and Ross to his laboratory, he completes an upgrade upon Armitage's chassis, one which gives her the power of flight and two particle cannons (Naomi comments that the wings are "too angelic for my taste", but does not deny that they are useful). Consequently, he stays in the lab and dies among his projects after the government destroys the entire complex with a tracking missile in an effort to destroy both Armitage and Ross.
René D'anclaude (ルネ・ダンクロード, Rune Dankurōdo)
Voiced by: Ryusei Nakao (Japanese); Dan Woren (English)
René D'anclaude is a doctor that worked with Dr. Asakura to create the Third types. His appearance is used for the line of "assassinroids" that were later used to destroy all the Third types, as well as a base template for their creation. After Armitage and Ross go rogue, D'anclaude is moved to a secretive section of a Mars hospital and the surrounding area is barricaded by official government tanks and droid troops. Armitage and Ross easily face this challenge and smuggle him out, having to avoid the assassinroid D'anclaude in the process.
Julian Moore (ジュリアン・ムーア, Jurian Mūa)
Voiced by: Megumi Ogata (OVA), Mitsuki Saiga (Dual-Matrix) (Japanese); Wanda Nowicki (OVA, Poly-Matrix), Mona Marshall (Dual-Matrix) (English)
Julian, whose alias is "Pluto", is the last model of the Third series, and the only male. He helps Naomi discover her true identity and her origin. An adept hacker, Julian attempts to help Armitage by delving into the files surrounding the creation of the Thirds. His attempt however, is hijacked by the D'anclaude assassinroid who controlled him via a planted computer virus. Armitage destroys the viral link, but it also causes Julian's body to self destruct. His last words to her is that maybe he'll get to meet the "real" D'anclaude. Sometime after his death, Armitage mourns his loss until Ross reminds her that Julian had backed up his programming into the main registry. Therefore, it might be possible to bring him back. He returns in Dual-Matrix, but only as a ghost program in the systems. He does provide information and remote control aid to Armitage.
Larry Randolph (ラリー・ランドルフ, Rarī Randorufu)
Voiced by: Masaharu Satou (Japanese); Edward Mannix (OVA, Eps 1-2), Michael Reynolds (OVA, Eps 3-4, Poly-Matrix) (English)
Randolph is the lieutenant of the Martian Police and head of the Technical Criminal SWAT division. He provides indiscriminate advice and opinions to those under him, as well as observations. Although he cannot do a thing to help Armitage and Ross through official channels, he does give them a well-deserved pep talk–signing off surrounded by all of their comrades within the squad.
Demetrio Mardini (デミトリオ・マルディーニ, Demitorio Marudīni)
Voiced by: Kazuhiro Yamaji (Japanese); Michael McConnohie (English)
Mardini is the vice president of an Earth Robotics Corporation and an admirer of Dr. Asakura's work. The antagonist of Dual-Matrix, he attempts to recreate his idol's work on Thirds, but his clones are unable to give birth to humans. Due to the declining birth rate on Mars, Demetrio plans to create human labor forces that never complain, soldiers who aren't afraid of dying, and increase the human population. He finds out that the original Armitage is still alive and tries to capture her to learn her reproduction secrets. He also attempts to blackmail Ross into not voting for the Robotic Rights Bill by holding Yoko hostage. He is subsequently killed by his own clones (controlled by Julian), when Armitage and her family make their escape.

=== Other characters ===
Eddie Barrows (エディー・バローズ, Edī Barōzu)
Voiced by: Hirohiko Kakegawa (OVA) (Japanese); Bryan Cranston (OVA, Poly-Matrix) (English)
Ross's wisecracking colleague in the Martian Police Department. He assists Ross throughout the events of Poly-Matrix, but in the end "squeals" on Ross to Randolph following the assault on the hospital.
Chris Brown (クリス・ブラウン, Kurisu Buraun)
Voiced by: Notobushi Hayashi (Japanese); Stephen Apostolina (OVA, Poly-Matrix) (English)
Lowell Gantz (ローウェル・ガンツ, Rōueru Gantsu)
Voiced by: Wataru Takagi (Japanese); Doug Stone (OVA) (English)
Eugene H. Allen (ユージン・H・アレン, Yūjin Eichi Aren)
Voiced by: Hideyuki Tanaka (Japanese); Sam Strong (OVA) (English)
Yoko (ヨーコ, Yōko)
Voiced by: Yuka Imai (Japanese); Rebecca Forstadt (English)
Ross and Armitage's biological daughter, who has a photographic memory. As far as Demetrio can tell, she is pure human.
Mouse (修理屋マウス, Mausu)
Voiced by: Takumi Yamazaki (Japanese); Ahmed Best (English)
A third who assists Armitage's repairs.
Fredrick O'Hara (フレデリック・オハラ, Furederikku Ohara)
O'Hara is the chairman of the Mars Foundation. He sends Ross, under the alias of Kevin Oldman, to Earth to vote in favor of the Robotic Rights Bill, promising amnesty for his and Armitage's previous crime. He strongly believes that giving robots' rights will be beneficial to the future of humanity.

== Production and release ==
In the text notes on the English DVD edition of Poly-Matrix, Chiaki Konaka, the script writer, says that Armitage III was influenced by H. P. Lovecraft's story The Dunwich Horror, one of Lovecraft's best known works and a key text in the Cthulhu Mythos; one of the main characters in the tale is a Dr. Armitage.

Armitage III was originally released as a four-episode original video animation (OVA) in Japan between February 25, 1995, and November 25, 1995. Pioneer USA released an English-dubbed version of the OVA series in VHS & LaserDisc format in North America in four volumes, each containing a single episode, between March 29, 1995, and December 5, 1995. The Region 1 DVD from Geneon of Poly-Matrix was one of the few releases from the company to feature THX-certified audio and video, and it was digitally remixed and remastered for superior picture quality and optimum audio presentation. Poly-Matrix was later aired on TechTV's anime block Anime Unleashed on May 2, 2003.

No.	Title	Japanese release date	English release date
1	"Electro Blood"	February 25, 1995	March 29, 1995
2	"Flesh & Stone"	April 21, 1995	June 27, 1995
3	"Heart Core"	June 25, 1995	September 5, 1995
4	"Bit of Love"	November 25, 1995	December 5, 1995

== Reception ==
Helen McCarthy in 500 Essential Anime Movies claims that the image quality of Armitage III: Poly-Matrix "isn't up to big screen standards, though it still holds well on home screens". She praises the design and scripts, while saying that the "basic plot is simply a retelling of Pinocchio—the toy that wants to be real, or, in science fiction terms, the robot yearning for love and acceptance as a person, not just a product".

The show's entry in The Encyclopedia of Science Fiction notes that the series "has many virtues, including its worldbuilding" but "some of the plotlines are underdeveloped [...] while some elements now [as of 2024] appear clichéd". The reviewer also harshly criticized a flaw in the show's logic, writing that "The story wishes to portray Earth as female-dominated and Mars as male-dominated [...] But, though there is a fairly universal antipathy towards robots and Thirds are suspected of being an attempt to replace women, having feminists demand the genocide of sentient female robots is, at best, unbecoming, if not downright crass: it undermine the serious points Armitage III wishes to make concerning Identity, consciousness and, particularly, sexual politics".

== Analysis ==
The series was likely influenced by Isaac Asimov's The Caves of Steel (1953), the movie Blade Runner (1982), and the entire genre of cyberpunk.

== In popular culture ==
Various songs in the power metal album Dark Connection by Beast in Black make references to the series. Examples include Moonlight Rendezvous, which uses quotes from the series, and Highway to Mars, which mentions the city of St. Lowell, Mars.
