= Sthamer =

Sthamer is a German surname. Notable people with the surname include:

- Friedrich Sthamer (1856–1931), German diplomat
- Nadja Sthamer (born 1990), German politician

== See also ==
- Starmer (surname)
- Stahmer
- Stamer
