= Strutt =

Strutt is a surname, and may refer to:

- Anna Strutt, New Zealand economist
- Art Strutt (1912–1993), American football player
- Arthur John Strutt (1818–1888), English painter, engraver, writer and traveler
- Charles Hedley Strutt (1849–1926), British Conservative Party politician, MP for Essex Eastern 1883–85, Maldon 1895–1906
- Charlotte Strutt, 1st Baroness Rayleigh (1758–1836), British peeress
- Edward Strutt, 1st Baron Belper (1801–1880), Liberal Party politician
- Edward Lisle Strutt (1874–1948), English mountaineer and Alpine Club president
- Fred Strutt (1939–2025), Australian rugby league footballer
- George Henry Strutt (1826–1895), cotton manufacturer and philanthropist
- George Herbert Strutt (1854–1928), cotton manufacturer and philanthropist
- Jacob George Strutt (1784–1867), English landscape painter and engraver
- James Strutt (1924–2008), Canadian architect
- Jedediah Strutt (1726–1797), hosier and cotton spinner
- John William Strutt, 3rd Baron Rayleigh (1842–1919), English physicist
- Joseph Strutt (engraver and antiquary) (1749–1802), English engraver and antiquary
- Joseph Strutt (philanthropist) (1765–1844), a Derby textile manufacturer and philanthropist
- Robert John Strutt, 4th Baron Rayleigh (1875–1947), English physicist
- William Strutt (artist), Anglo-Australian artist
- William Strutt (inventor) (1756–1830), inventor and cotton spinner

== See also ==
- Strutt's North Mill, Belper, England
- The Herbert Strutt School, Belper, England
- Strutt & Parker, a UK property consultancy
- Strut (disambiguation)
