= Berserker (Beast in Black album) =

Studio album by Beast in Black
- Released: 3 November 2017
- Studio: Sound Quest Studio
- Genres: Power metal; heavy metal
- Length: 43:20
- Label: Nuclear Blast
- Producer: Anton Kabanen

Beast in Black chronology
Berserker (2017)	From Hell with Love (2019)

Singles from Berserker
- 1. "Blind and Frozen" Released: 8 September 2017; 2. "Beast in Black" Released: 30 October 2017; 3. "Born Again" Released: 3 November 2017; 4. "Zodd the Immortal" Released: 22 December 2017

Professional ratings
Review scores
Source	Rating
Metal Storm	8.8/10

Berserker is the debut studio album by Finnish heavy metal band Beast in Black, released on 3 November 2017. The album ranked seventh on the Finnish albums chart. In addition, it charted in Germany, the United Kingdom, Sweden, Switzerland, and France.

The album name is a reference to the manga Berserk by Kentarō Miura. Several tracks also contain lyrics based on part of its plot and characters, including "Beast in Black", "Zodd the Immortal" and "The Fifth Angel".

== Track listing ==
All tracks are written by Anton Kabanen.

Berserker track listing
No.	Title	Length
1.	"Beast in Black"	4:29
2.	"Blind and Frozen"	5:04
3.	"Blood of a Lion"	5:03
4.	"Born Again"	3:51
5.	"Zodd the Immortal"	3:34
6.	"The Fifth Angel"	3:30
7.	"Crazy, Mad, Insane"	3:30
8.	"Eternal Fire"	3:34
9.	"End of the World"	5:10
10.	"Ghost in the Rain"	5:35
Total length:		43:20

Digipak edition bonus tracks
No.	Title	Length
8.	"Hell for All Eternity"	4:48
10.	"Go to Hell"	3:01
Total length:		51:09

== Personnel ==
Beast in Black

- Yannis Papadopoulos – lead vocals
- Anton Kabanen – lead guitar, keyboards, backing vocals
- Kasperi Heikkinen – rhythm guitar
- Máté Molnár – bass
- Sami Hänninen – drums

Additional personnel

- Teemu Koivistoinen – backing vocals

Production

- Anton Kabanen – production, recording, mixing, orchestration
- Roman Ismailov – artwork
- Tero Kinnunen – mixing
- Jarmo Katila – photography
- Toni Kilpinen – photography (editing)
- Emil Pohjalainen – mixing (additional)
- Mika Jussila – mastering

== Charts ==
Chart performance for Berserker
Chart (2021)	Peak position
Finnish Albums (Suomen virallinen lista)	7
French Albums (SNEP)	169
German Albums (Offizielle Top 100)	51
Swedish Albums (Sverigetopplistan)	13
Swiss Albums (Schweizer Hitparade)	33
