= From Hell with Love =

Studio album by Beast in Black
- Released: 8 February 2019
- Studio: Sound Quest Studio
- Genres: Power metal; heavy metal
- Length: 43:08
- Label: Nuclear Blast
- Producer: Anton Kabanen

Beast in Black chronology
Berserker (2017)	From Hell with Love (2019)	Dark Connection (2021)

Singles from From Hell with Love
- 1. "Sweet True Lies" Released: November 30, 2018; 2. "Die by the Blade" Released: January 11, 2019; 3. "From Hell with Love" Released: February 14, 2019; 4. "Cry Out for a Hero" Released: December 3, 2019

From Hell with Love is the second studio album by Finnish heavy metal band Beast in Black, released on 8 February 2019. The album charted well, ranking number one in their home country, and did well in Sweden, Switzerland, Austria, and Germany. An unrated review of the album can be found in Metal Storm.

== Track listing ==
All tracks are written by Anton Kabanen, except where stated.

From Hell with Love track listing
No.	Title	Lyrics	Length
1.	"Cry Out for a Hero"	Anton Kabanen, Paolo Ribaldini	3:27
2.	"From Hell with Love"		3:55
3.	"Sweet True Lies"		3:26
4.	"Repentless"	Kabanen, Ribaldini	4:02
5.	"Die by the Blade"		3:14
6.	"Oceandeep"		5:46
7.	"Unlimited Sin"		3:34
8.	"True Believer"	Kabanen, Ribaldini	3:28
9.	"This Is War"	Kabanen, Ribaldini	3:39
10.	"Heart of Steel"	Ribaldini	4:22
11.	"No Surrender"	Kabanen, Ribaldini	4:15
Total length:			43:08

Bonus tracks
No.	Title	Length
12.	"Killed by Death" (Motörhead cover)	3:54
13.	"No Easy Way Out" (Robert Tepper cover)	4:05
Total length:		51:02

== Personnel ==
Beast in Black

- Yannis Papadopoulos – lead vocals
- Anton Kabanen – lead guitar, keyboards, backing vocals
- Kasperi Heikkinen – rhythm guitar
- Máté Molnár – bass
- Atte Palokangas – drums

Production

- Anton Kabanen – production, recording, mixing, orchestration
- Roman Ismailov – artwork
- Jarmo Katila – photography
- Toni Kilpinen – photography (editing)
- Emil Pohjalainen – mastering
- Janne Peltonen – layout

== Charts ==
Chart performance for From Hell with Love
Chart (2021)	Peak position
Austrian Albums (Ö3 Austria)	17
Belgian Albums (Ultratop Flanders)	60
Belgian Albums (Ultratop Wallonia)	179
Finnish Albums (Suomen virallinen lista)	1
French Albums (SNEP)	143
German Albums (Offizielle Top 100)	6
Scottish Albums (Official Charts)	49
Swedish Albums (Sverigetopplistan)	55
Swiss Albums (Schweizer Hitparade)	8
