= Kasperi Heikkinen =

Finnish guitarist

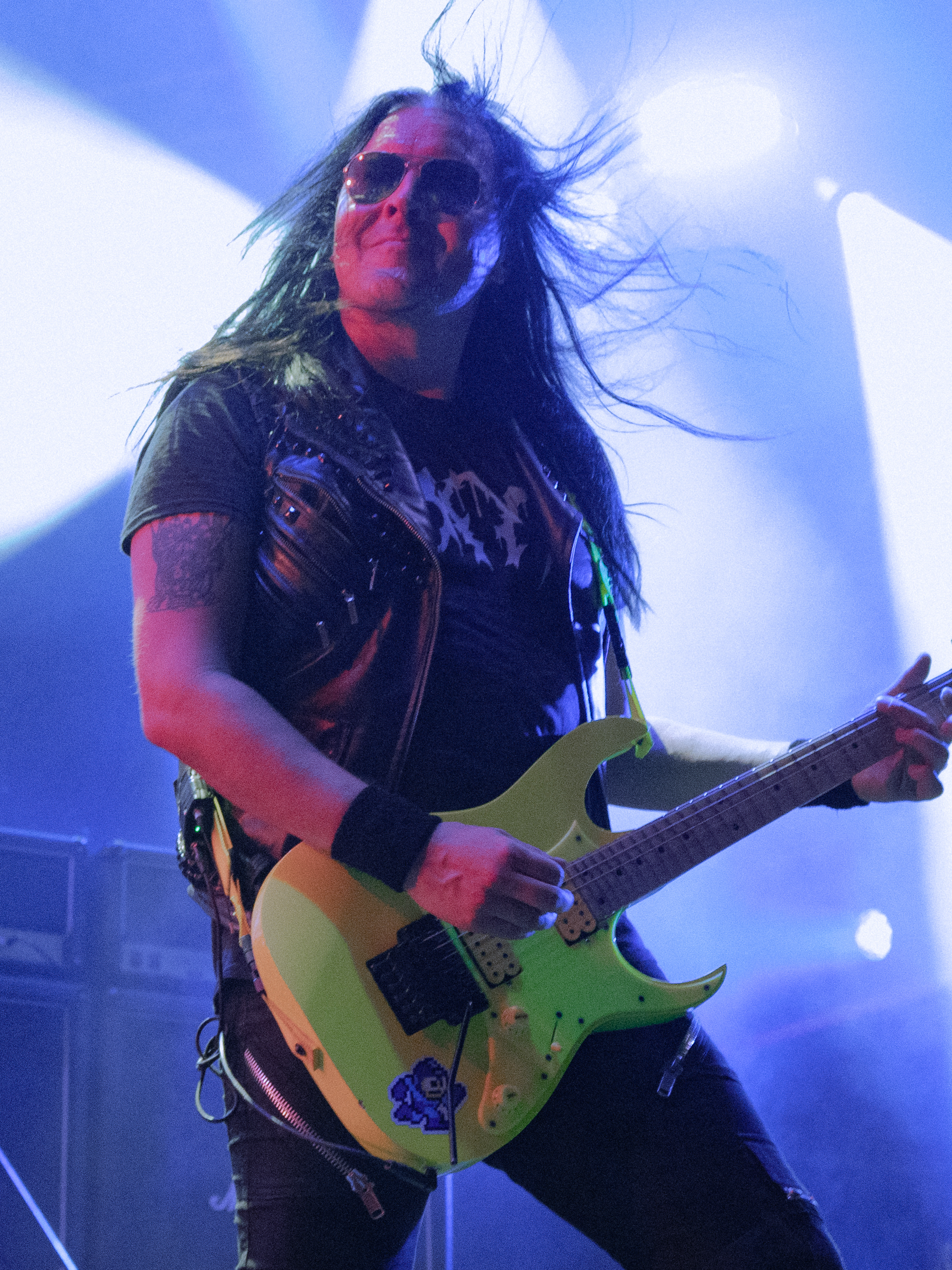
- Heikkinen performing with Gamma Ray in 2024

Background information
- Born: 4 August 1980 (age 46); Kajaani, Finland
- Genres: Symphonic power metal, heavy metal
- Occupation: Musician
- Instrument: Guitar
- Years active: 2002–present

Kasperi Heikkinen (born 4 August 1980) is a Finnish guitarist who is best known as a former member of symphonic power metal band Amberian Dawn. He played in the band from early 2007 until late 2012. He is also the guitarist for Finnish metal bands Merging Flare and Guardians of Mankind, which is a Gamma Ray tribute band. Heikkinen performed with German metal band U.D.O. from 2013 until 2017. He currently resides in Helsinki.

As a touring musician, Heikkinen has played on part of the German power metal band Gamma Ray's Majestic tour in 2006 following an injury to Henjo Richter. On their most recent to the Metal-tour, Heikkinen replaced Henjo Richter once again for shows scheduled in Germany and Czech Republic in March 2010. He also shared stage with his fellow axemen Hansen and Richter making "a three guitar special" for the encore numbers at the Nosturi club in Helsinki, Finland on 29 March 2010.

In 2015, Heikkinen was brought into heavy metal band Beast in Black by guitarist Anton Kabanen. After recording three studio albums with Beast in Black, he departed from the band in October 2025.

== Discography ==
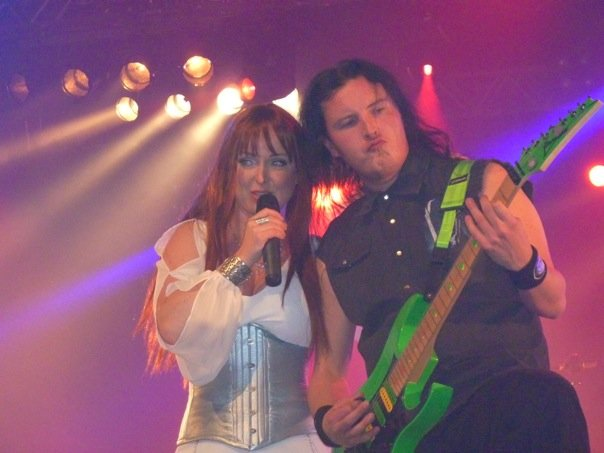
Heikkinen and Heidi Parviainen with Amberian Dawn in 2009

=== With Merging Flare ===
- S/T, Promo-EP (2003)
- Hell to Pay, Promo-EP (2005)
- Beyond The Blackhole/Under The Fire, Split-EP (Guardians of Mankind / Merging Flare), Imperiumi Records (2007)
- Reverence, Disentertainment (2011)
- Revolt Regime, Ram It Down Records (2019)

=== With Amberian Dawn ===
- River of Tuoni, Suomen Musiikki (2008)
- The Clouds of Northland Thunder, Suomen Musiikki (2009)
- End of Eden, Spinefarm (2010)
- Circus Black, Spinefarm (2012)

=== With Elenium ===
- Them Used Gods, Self Financed EP (2002)
- For Giving For Getting, Rage of Achilles (2003)
- Caught in Wheel, Kampas Records (2007)

=== With U.D.O. ===
- Steelhammer, AFM Records (2013)
- Decadent, AFM Records (2015)

=== With Beast in Black ===
- Berserker, Nuclear Blast (2017)
- From Hell with Love, Nuclear Blast (2019)
- Dark Connection, Nuclear Blast (2021)

=== Other ===
- Omnium Gatherum: "Spirits And August Light", Rage of Achilles (2002), guest guitar solo on track #3 "The Perfumed Garden"
- Heavy Metal Perse / Guardians of Mankind: Legenda Taikamiekasta/Kuninkaidenlaakso, Split-EP, Imperiumi Records (2004)
- Heavy Metal Perse: "Eripura", Dethrone Music (2006), guest guitar solo on track #4 "Pahaksi Parkittu Lalli"
- Conquest: The Harvest, self-financed (2011)
- Dark Sarah: "Attack of Orym", Riena Productions (2023), guest guitar solo on track #3 "Invincible" and track #7 "Delirium"

== Equipment ==

Heikkinen is on the artist roster of Ibanez guitars and uses the following models:

- Ibanez Jem77FP
- Ibanez Jem77BRMR
- Ibanez Jem77VBK
- Ibanez Jem777LNG
- Ibanez UV777PBK
- Ibanez UV7PWH
- Ibanez UV777GR
- Ibanez UV77MC
- Ibanez PGM100RE
- Ibanez RGT320QRBB
- Ibanez Rocket Roll (Flying V)

Heikkinen uses Mesa/Boogie amplification exclusively.

- Mesa/Boogie TriAxis Preamp
- Mesa/Boogie 2:50 Amp
- Mesa/Boogie Rectifier 4x12 cabinet

Effects and accessories

- TC Electronics G-Major multi-effect processor
