= Wardrum =

Greek power metal band

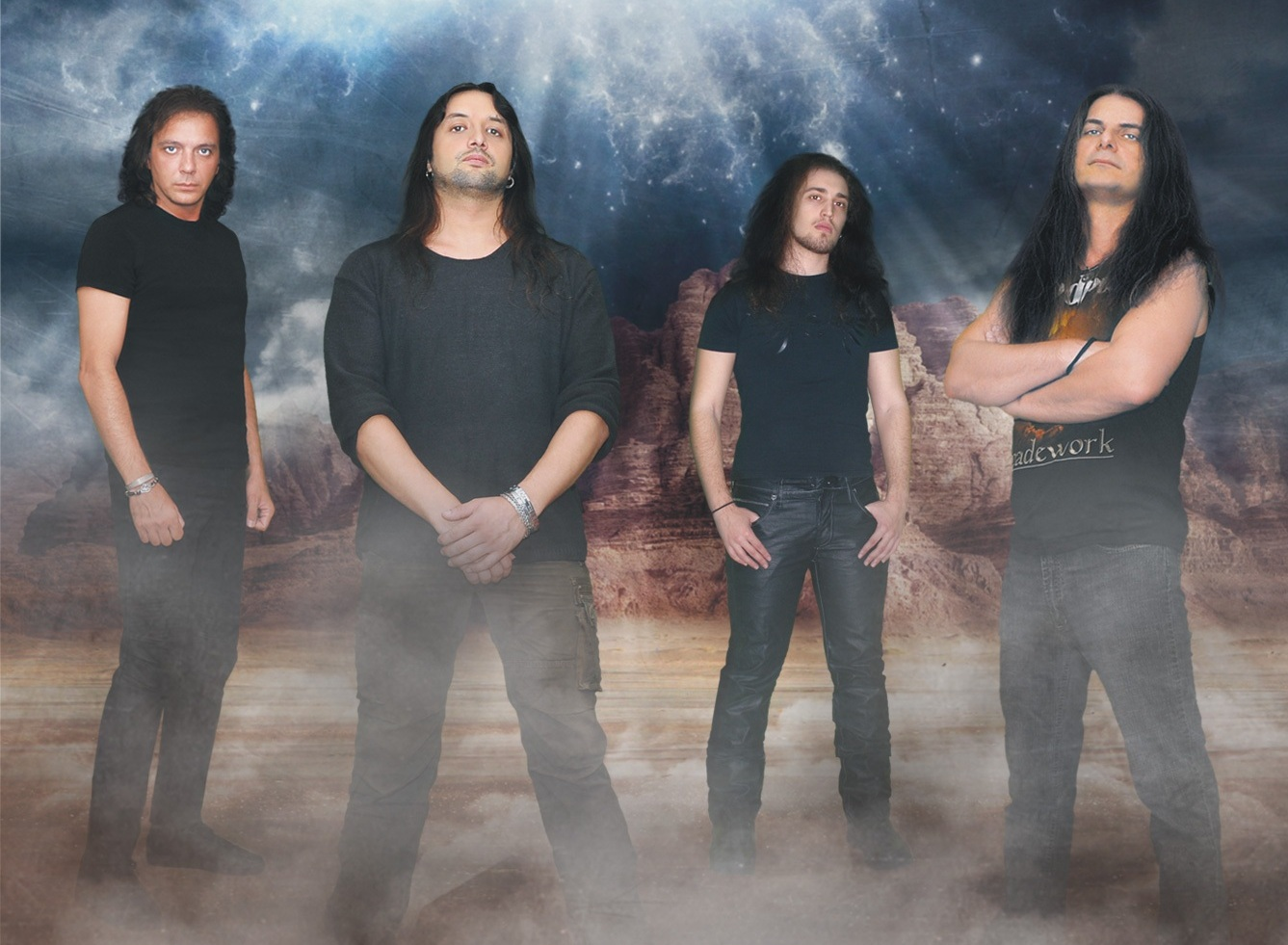
- Pic from the "Desolation" photo session 2012

Background information
- Origin: Thessaloniki, Greece
- Genres: Power metal
- Years active: 2010–present
- Label: Steel Gallery Records
- Members: George Margaritopoulos; Kosta Vreto; Stergios Kourou; J. Demian; Strutter
- Past members: Yannis Papadopoulos; Kostas Scandalis; Piero Leporale
- Website: www.wardrum.gr

Wardrum is a Greek power metal band, formed in the summer of 2010.

== History ==
They were formed in Thessaloniki, Greece, by drummer Stergios Kourou, along with guitarist Kosta Vreto and bass player Kostas Scandalis (all three of them members of progressive metal band Horizon's End). Wardrum were originally fronted by Uli Jon Roth's Italian singer Piero Leporale, while front-man Yannis Papadopoulos joined them as lead vocalist in early 2012.

Their debut album Spadework was released by Steel Gallery Records on 20 April 2011 and the band was rated as one of the most promising bands in Greece. The Spadework lineup performed live only once, opening for Crimson Glory's show in Thessaloniki on 22 October 2011. In February 2012 the band parted ways with Leporale and found a local singer, to be more flexible and work easier. Yannis Papadopoulos took over the band's front-man position and they immediately recorded Desolation which was released on 25 April 2012. In October–December of the same year the band toured all over Greece to support the new album and managed to create a solid core of fans who have shown their support by voting the band in Metal Hammer magazine's annual polls as the fourth best Greek band.

In December 2017, the band parted ways with singer Yannis Papadopoulos, who several months before had joined Finnish band Beast in Black.

In March 2019, Wardrum announced new singer, George Margaritopoulos, who later participated in the fifth album of the band, Mavericks, released on May 28, 2021.

== Line-up ==
=== Current ===
- George Margaritopoulos – vocals
- Kosta Vreto – guitar
- J Demian – guitar
- Strutter – bass
- Stergios Kourou – drums

=== Former members ===
- Piero Leporale – Vocals (2011)
- Kostas Scandalis – Bass
- Yannis Papadopoulos – Vocals (2012–2017)

=== Additional touring members ===
- Kostas Vaporidis – guitar

== Discography ==
=== Albums ===
- Spadework (2011)
- Desolation (2012)
- Messenger (2013)
- The Awakening (2016)
- Mavericks (2021)

== Videography ==
=== Music videos ===
- Crest of the Wave (2011)
- Parental (2012)
- The Messenger (2014)
- Travel Far Away (2014)
