= Dirk Stamer =

German politician (born 1980)

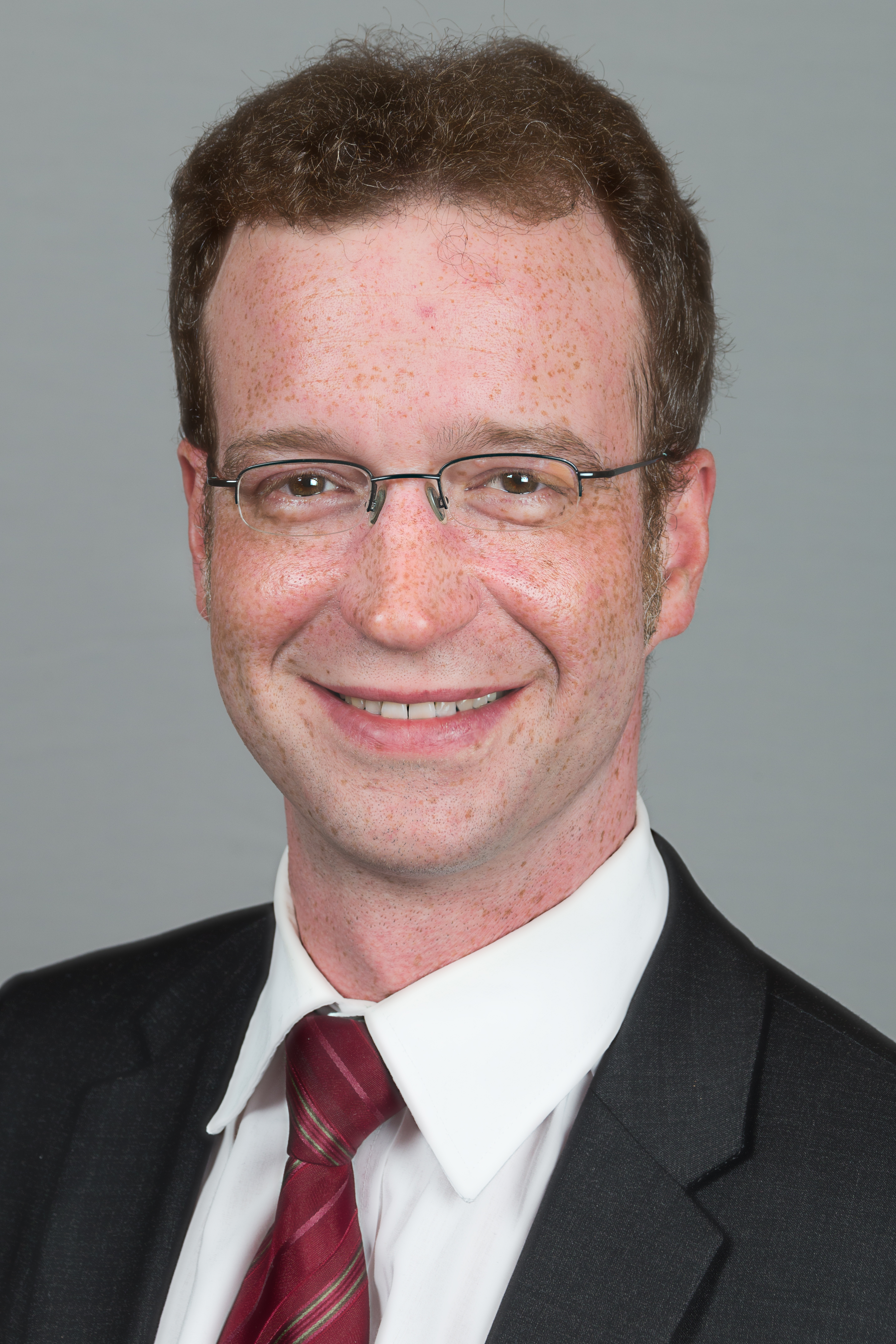
- Stamer in 2017

Member of the Landtag of Mecklenburg-Vorpommern
- Incumbent
- Assumed office 4 October 2016
- Preceded by: Volker Schlotmann
- Constituency: Landkreis Rostock II

Personal details
- Born: 13 June 1980 (age 46)
- Party: Social Democratic Party

Dirk Stamer (born 13 June 1980) is a German politician serving as a member of the Landtag of Mecklenburg-Vorpommern since 2016. He has been a municipal councillor of Kritzmow since 2014.
