= Strut (typesetting) =

Invisible character in typesetting

In typesetting, a strut is an invisible character or element, used to ensure that a text has a minimum height and depth, even if no other elements are included.

For example, LaTeX and plain TeX provide the command

\strut

to insert a font size-specific strut. In LaTeX it has a height of 70% of the baseline skip (the distance between the baselines of two consecutive lines of text) and a depth of 30% of the baseline skip. It ensures that two vertical stacked boxes which include such a strut have the same distance as two normal consecutive lines. LaTeX also supports the creation of general struts using the command:

\rule[-depth]{0pt}{total height}

where \strut is equivalent in size to \rule[-.3\baselineskip]{0pt}{\baselineskip}.

(La)TeX also has the macro

 \mathstrut

to be used in mathematical mode and which is defined as

 \vphantom (

that is as a zero-width left round bracket.
