= Starmer (surname) =

Starmer is a surname. It is an English habitational surname, derived from Starmore in Leicestershire. Alternatively, it can also be derived from "Stermore near Stowe", which used to exist in Staffordshire. Variants of the surname include Starmore, Starsmore, Starsmoor, and Starsmeare.

Notable people by that name include:

- Aaron Starmer (born 1976), American author
- Charles Starmer (1870–1933), British newspaper proprietor and Liberal politician
- Clement Starmer (1895–1978), English cricketer
- Keir Starmer (born 1962), British politician and the Prime Minister from 2024 until 2026.
- Nigel Starmer-Smith (born 1944), English rugby union player, journalist and commentator
- Victoria Starmer (née Alexander), British former solicitor, wife of Keir Starmer
- Walter P. Starmer (1877–1961), English artist
- William Austin Starmer, American sheet music cover artist
- William T. Starmer (born 1944), American geneticist and professor

== See also ==
- Starner (surname)
- Sthamer (surname)
- Stahmer (surname)
