= Dark Connection =

Studio album by Beast in Black
- Released: 29 October 2021
- Studios: Sound Quest Studio, Amethyst Sound Productions
- Genres: Power metal; heavy metal
- Length: 47:48
- Label: Nuclear Blast
- Producer: Anton Kabanen

Beast in Black chronology
From Hell with Love (2019)	Dark Connection (2021)

Singles from Dark Connection
- 1. "Moonlight Rendezvous" Released: September 3, 2021; 2. "One Night in Tokyo" Released: September 30, 2021; 3. "Hardcore" Released: November 1, 2021; 4. "Broken Survivors" Released: May 6, 2022; 5. "Blade Runner" Released: January 11, 2023; 6. "To The Last Drop Of Blood" Released: August 24, 2023

Professional ratings
Review scores
Source	Rating
Blabbermouth.net	8/10
Metal Storm	9.0/10
Sonic Perspectives	8.9/10

Dark Connection is the third studio album by Finnish heavy metal band Beast in Black, released on 29 October 2021. Similar to their debut album Berserker, several songs reference well known science fiction series like Blade Runner with several songs containing direct references to the anime Armitage III. The album charted well, ranking number one in their home country, and did well in Sweden, Switzerland, Austria, and Germany. Four videos were produced for the tracks "Moonlight Rendezvous", "Hardcore", "One Night in Tokyo" and "Blade Runner". The album was dedicated to Kentaro Miura, the author of Berserk, who had died earlier that year.

== Reception ==
Upon its release, Dark Connection was praised by critics. Blabbermouth.net spoke positively on the release, mentioning that it is "bursting with absolutely blistering riffs and guitar work", combined with "deeply infectious vocal work and choruses", concluding that "At the end of the day, in terms of art and creativity, Beast in Black has hit the ball out of the park with album number three."

Sonic Perspectives praised it, commenting: "Having been at the forefront of bringing the worlds of melodic metal and 80s post-disco/synth pop together for the past decade, former Battle Beast guitarist and mastermind Anton Kabanen, and his current fold of veteran metal warriors, usher in their latest studio venture in effortless fashion, proving that what is old can indeed become new." Games, Brains & a Headbanging Life called it a very satisfying listen, besides a few tracks that don't have as much oomph as others. It's "one that shows just how much they've grown and just how bright their future is." A reviewer from Metal Storm praised it as being the band's strongest album yet; praising all aspects such as performance, production, overall sound, and album cohesion. MetalMusicPlanet deemed it as being "Absolutely essential listening for fans of the genre and for anyone who just loves any kind of melodic Rock or Metal music."

== Track listing ==
All tracks are written by Anton Kabanen, except where stated.

Dark Connection track listing
No.	Title	Length
1.	"Blade Runner"	4:07
2.	"Bella Donna"	3:52
3.	"Highway to Mars"	5:13
4.	"Hardcore"	3:34
5.	"One Night in Tokyo"	3:07
6.	"Moonlight Rendezvous"	5:38
7.	"Revengeance Machine"	4:09
8.	"Dark New World"	3:57
9.	"To the Last Drop of Blood"	3:55
10.	"Broken Survivors"	4:25
11.	"My Dystopia"	5:51
Total length:		47:48

Bonus tracks
No.	Title	Writer(s)	Length
12.	"Battle Hymn" (Manowar cover)	Joey DeMaio, Ross Friedman	6:54
13.	"They Don't Care About Us" (Michael Jackson cover)	Michael Jackson	4:32
Total length:			59:14

== Personnel ==
Beast in Black

- Yannis Papadopoulos – lead vocals
- Anton Kabanen – lead guitar, keyboards, backing vocals
- Kasperi Heikkinen – rhythm guitar
- Máté Molnár – bass
- Atte Palokangas – drums

Additional personnel

- Cynthia – keyboards
- Mikael Salo – backing vocals
- Paolo Ribaldini – backing vocals

Production

- Anton Kabanen – production, recording, mixing, orchestration
- Roman Ismailov – artwork
- Yannis Papadopoulos – mixing (assistant)
- Jarmo Katila – photography
- Toni Kilpinen – photography (editing)
- Emil Pohjalainen – mastering
- Janne Peltonen – layout

== Charts ==
Chart performance for Dark Connection
Chart (2021)	Peak position
Austrian Albums (Ö3 Austria)	16
Belgian Albums (Ultratop Flanders)	144
Belgian Albums (Ultratop Wallonia)	168
Finnish Albums (Suomen virallinen lista)	1
French Albums (SNEP)	165
German Albums (Offizielle Top 100)	13
Scottish Albums (Official Charts)	31
Swedish Albums (Sverigetopplistan)	53
Swiss Albums (Schweizer Hitparade)	11
UK Rock & Metal Albums (Official Charts)	7
