= Máté Molnár =

Hungarian bassist (born 1979)

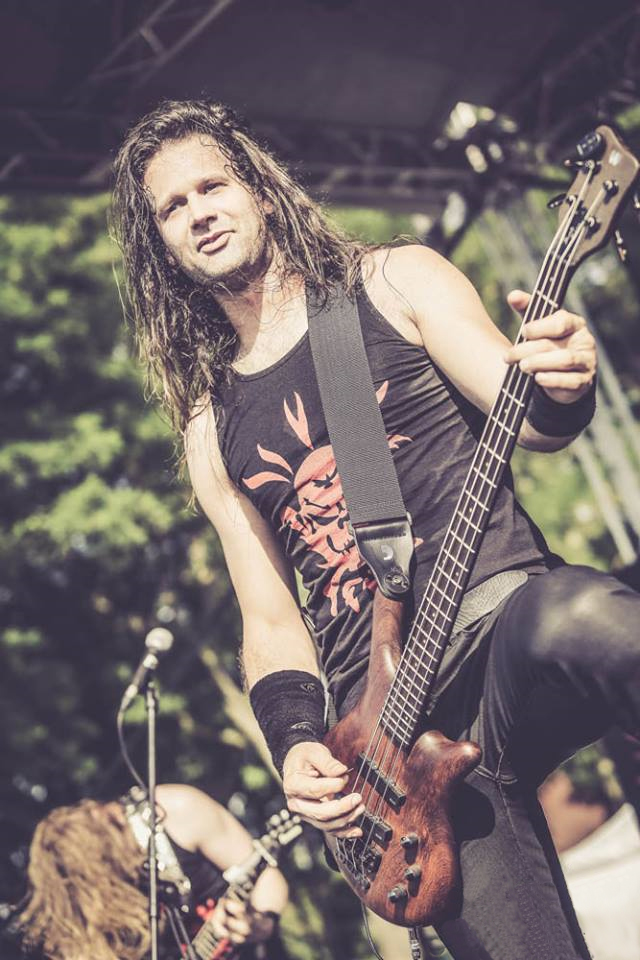
- Molnár performing with Wisdom at Rockpart festival in Balatonszemes, Hungary, in 2016

Background information
- Born: 25 May 1979 (age 47); Budapest, Hungary
- Genres: Power metal, heavy metal
- Occupation: Musician
- Instrument: Bass
- Years active: 1995–present
- Member of: Beast in Black
- Formerly of: Wisdom
- Website: beastinblack.com

Máté Molnár (born 25 May 1979) is a Hungarian musician who is the bass player and a backing vocalist of the Finnish heavy metal band Beast in Black. He was also a member of the power metal band Wisdom, which he had founded while he was at university. Molnár is known for his unique-looking bass guitars, handcrafted by GV Guitars.

== Early life ==
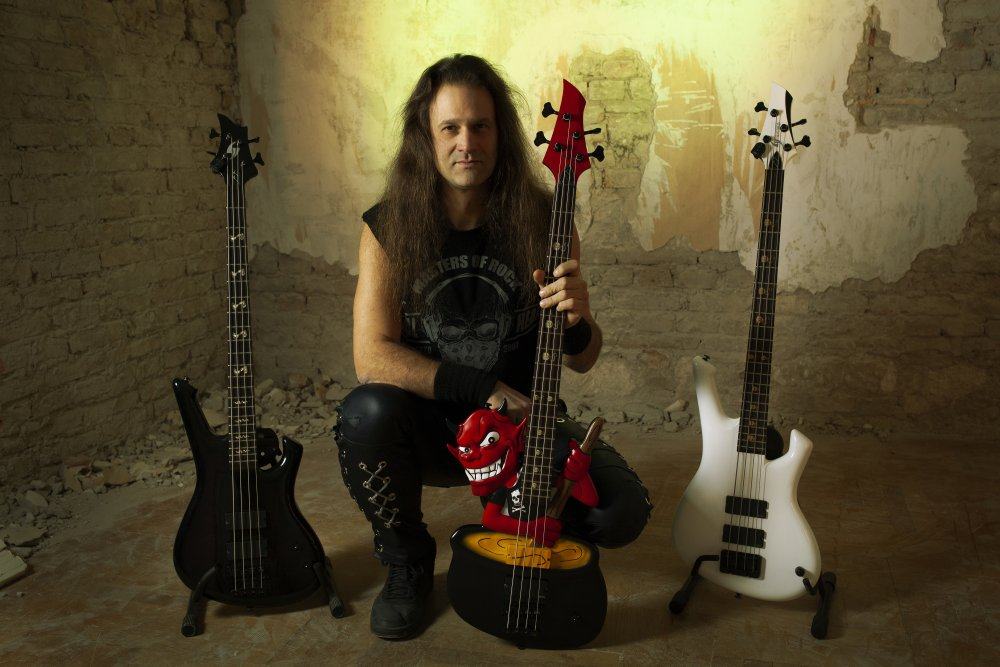
Molnár with his signature bass guitars

Máté Molnár was born on 25 May 1979 at Kútvölgyi hospital in Budapest. He is the first son of Etelka Horváth and Csaba Molnár, who married in 1975 and both worked as teachers in a vocational school. His younger brother Rudolf is a successful entrepreneur. Molnár attended the local Mezőkövesd street primary school, and at the age of nine he started canoeing at Budapesti Spartacus SC. He won several Hungarian championships and during his teenage years he was one of few competitors in his sports club who earned a monthly salary. At the age of 13 he was admitted to Attila József high school. During this time, he started to play guitar and formed his first bands.

After graduating high school, Molnár had to decide between professional sportsmanship and going to university. Giving up his perspectives in canoeing, he won scholarship to the Budapest University of Technology and Economics in 1997, and graduated with a M.Sc. in Mechanical Engineering in 2002. Following his graduation, Molnár was invited to continue to doctoral studies, but instead he chose to avoid leaving Wisdom, the Budapest-based band he was in at the time.

In 2000, during the university years, he switched from guitar to bass and answered the advertisement of a band called Elysian, who were looking for a bass player. At that time, the band's lead vocalist was Attila Tóth, who later became the singer for two legendary Hungarian bands, Pokolgép and Mobilmánia. Molnár recorded a short EP and had several performances with Elysian, but following some disagreements, he quit the band to form Wisdom in 2001.

When Wisdom went on a three-year long hiatus, Molnár applied to Corvinus University of Budapest and was awarded the professional qualification of Public Administration Modernization Manager, receiving the grade of "excellent" in 2011.

== Wisdom (2001–2016) ==
Molnár formed Wisdom in 2001, with the band's name being inspired by the 1986 film Wisdom. The group included lead vocalist Istvan Nachladal, guitarist and main composer Gabor Kovacs, guitarist Zsolt Galambos and drummer Balazs Hornyak. Molnár was the manager of the band; he wrote all the lyrics and composed one song "Silent Hill". The group released four full-length albums and two EPs. Wisdom had a mascot figure Wiseman, who appeared both on the band's album covers and in their live shows. They organized an annual event titled Keep Wiseman Alive featuring guest bands like Powerwolf, The Poodles, Delain and Evergrey. In 2014, on the eighth "Keep Wiseman Alive", Fabio Lione of Rhapsody was the special guest, singing three songs together with Wisdom.

Wisdom was one of very few Hungarian bands whose popularity could break out from their country. After they signed a deal with NoiseArt Records and Rock the Nation booking agency, their albums were released worldwide and they embarked on several European tours. They were the supporting acts for Sabaton in 2012–2013 and for Powerwolf in 2013.

After several line-up changes, Wisdom stopped playing shows and releasing albums in 2016. They never announced the end of the band, but have been on indefinite hiatus. In the band's final two years, Anton Kabanen joined on guitar, with whom Molnár later founded Beast in Black.

== Beast in Black (2015–present) ==
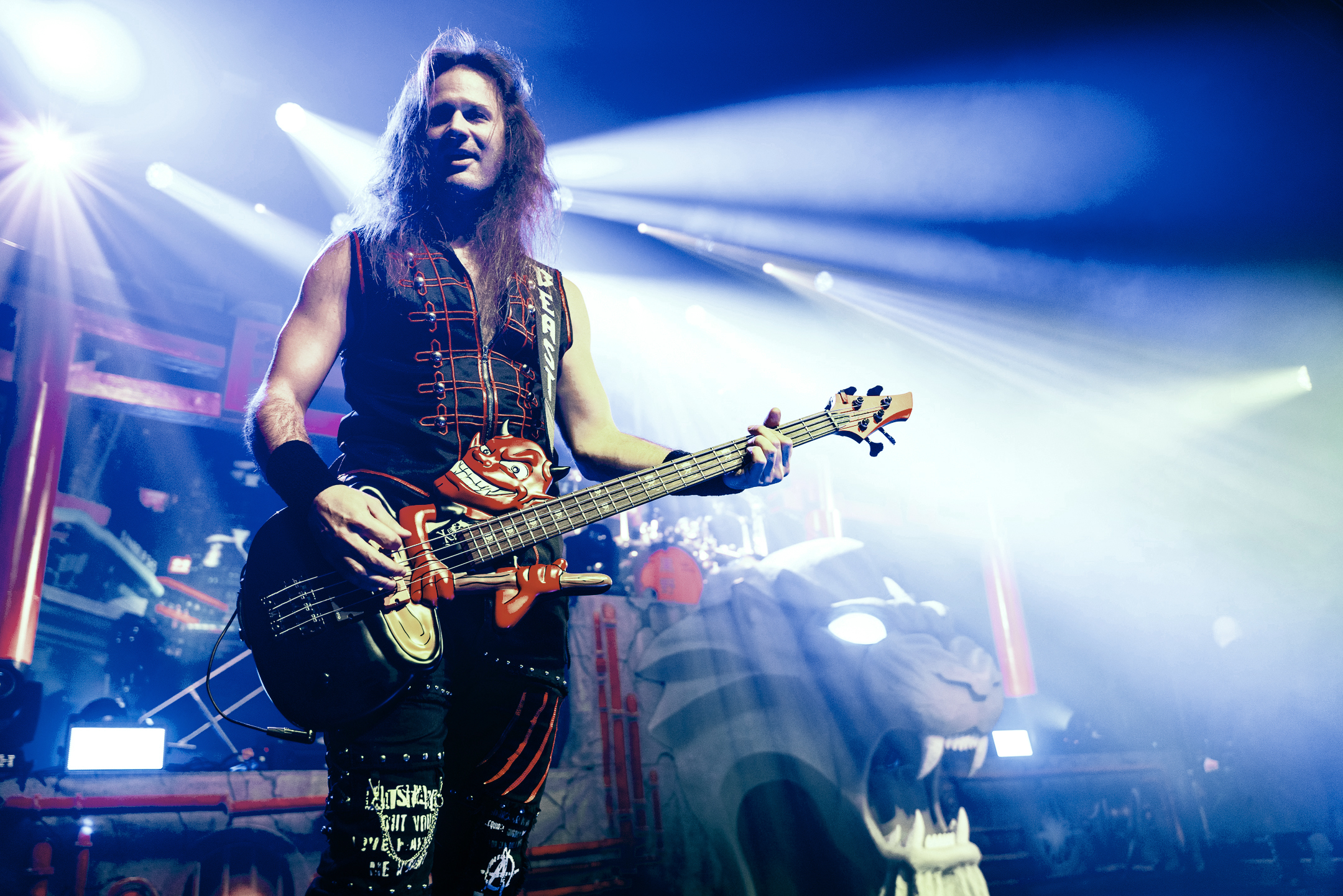
Molnár performing with Beast in Black on the "Glory and the Beast" tour in Brussels in 2024

While still performing and releasing an album with Wisdom, Molnár and Kabanen went on to create Beast in Black in 2015. The band's line-up consisted of three Finnish musicians, one Hungarian musician and one Greek musician. They gathered worldwide fame relatively quickly after finding success with their first single "Blind and Frozen", in 2017. Before Beast in Black's popularity later skyrocketed, Molnár also worked as a design engineer for a construction company in Budapest, leading its high pressure water cutting department .

Since Beast in Black's inception, besides playing the bass, Molnár has been the band's unofficial manager, handling most of the business-side moving parts behind the scenes. Kabanen said in an interview to Blabbermouth: "Our bass player, Máté, is taking care of a lot of things in the band". With his contribution, Molnár has a significant role in the success of Beast in Black.

== Equipment ==
Máté Molnár is endorsed by GV Guitars, a Slovak handcrafted instruments manufacturing company. Their partnership started during Wisdom years, around 2014. Before that, Molnár used Warwick basses, and he still owns a Warwick Thumb NT4 1991 model. In the early stages of Wisdom, Molnár used a Warwick Fortress One bass guitar which was signed by Steve Harris of Iron Maiden, when Wisdom opened for them in 2003. This instrument was later sold.

GV guitars has made a total of four bass guitars to Molnár, all of them with EMG 35DC pick-ups.

Molnár's signature bass guitars, handcrafted by GV Guitars
Name	Year	Description	Era	Image
Serpent	2016	Body: Neofang, black color; Neck: cobra and serpent inlays	Used in Wisdom and in Beast in Black during Berserker era	
Two Devils	2019	Body: Neofang, white color; Neck: two devil heads inlays referring to Molnár's sons	Used in Beast in Black during From Hell With Love era	
Devil	2021	Body: red devil stirring a yellow soup in a black cauldron; Neck: two devil heads inlays	Used in Beast in Black during Dark Connection era	
Beast	2024	Body: the Beast symbol of Beast in Black; Neck: luminous BEAST letters and Beast symbol inlays	Used in Beast in Black during Power of the Beast era	

Molnár uses Tech 21 SansAmp Bass Driver DI, Ernie Ball 2832 Regular Slinky Nickel Wound Electric Bass 50-105 strings and Dunlop 431R 1.00 Tortex Triangle picks.
