= Stammer (disambiguation) =

A stammer or stutter is a speech disorder typified by the involuntary repetition of a sound or sounds.

Stammer may also refer to:

- "Stammer", a song by the Supernaturals from It Doesn't Matter Anymore

== People with the surname ==
- Kay Stammers (1914–2005), British tennis player
- Keith Stammers, 20th-century English politician
- Reinhard Stammer (born 1952), German painter & artist
- Richard Stammers, special effects artist
- Stan Stammers (born 1961), British punk musician

== See also ==
- List of people known as the Stammerer
- Stamer
- Stahmer
