= Echoterra =

American symphonic power metal band

- Origin: Minneapolis, Minnesota, U.S.
- Genres: Symphonic Power Metal
- Years active: 2007-present
- Label: Blinding Force Recordings
- Members: Jonah Weingarten; Yan Leviathan; Adam Sagan; Chelsea Wrathchild; Cory Scheider
- Past members: Melissa Ferlaak; Brian Hollenbeck; John Gensmer; Sam Van Moer; Suvi Virtanen

Echoterra is an American symphonic power metal band from Minneapolis, Minnesota, United States, founded in 2007 by Jonah Weingarten and Yan Leviathan.

== History ==
=== Formation (2007–2008) ===
Echoterra was formed in Minneapolis in 2007 by Jonah Weingarten and Yan Leviathan. In 2008, Suvi Virtanen, once a live member of Therion, joined the band as the vocalist. Brian Hollenbeck on bass and vocals, and John Gensmer on drums completed the lineup.

=== The Law of One and lineup changes (2009–2010) ===
Echoterra's debut album, The Law of One, was released on September 15, 2009 on Blinding Force Recordings.

Suvi Virtanen's living in Sweden made it difficult for the band to perform live, so in 2009 she left the group and was replaced by Melissa Ferlaak, who had sung in symphonic metal bands Aesma Daeva and Visions Of Atlantis. Adam Sagan replaced Gensmer on drums.

On January 5, 2009, Echoterra released the In Your Eyes EP with remastered songs. In 2010, the band began regularly to perform live.

=== Land of the Midnight Sun, Ferlaak's departure, and A Sanguinary Greed (2011–present) ===
The band released Land of the Midnight Sun on October 17, 2011.

On March 13, 2012, Melissa Ferlaak announced that she had left Echoterra due to musical differences. Chelsea Wrathchild, who had been the lead vocalist in Hollowstone, debuted as Echoterra's singer on the 2014 EP A Sanguinary Greed.

== Band members ==
=== Current ===
- Jonah Weingarten - Keyboards, Orchestration (2007–present)
- Yan Leviathan - Guitars (2007–present)
- Adam Sagan - Drums (2009–present)
- Chelsea Wrathchild - Vocals (2013–present)
- Cory Scheider - Bass (2014–present)

=== Former ===
- Suvi Virtanen - Vocals (2008–2009)
- Melissa Ferlaak - Vocals (2009–2012)
- John Gensmer - Drums (2007–2009)
- Brian Hollenbeck - Bass (2007–2011)
- Sam Van Moer - Bass (2011–2013)

== Discography ==
=== Studio albums ===
- The Law of One (2009)
- Land of the Midnight Sun (2011)

=== EPs ===
- In Your Eyes (2010)
- A Sanguinary Greed (2014)

=== Singles ===
- "After the Rain" (2011)
- "Sirens of Sinew and Sin" (2014)
