= Ad Inferna =

French metal and industrial band

- Origin: France, US
- Genres: Gothic metal, darkwave, symphonic black metal, dark electro-industrial
- Years active: 1998-2015
- Labels: Last Episode, Silverdust Metal Blade, Nilaihah USA, Aural Music, DSM Music
- Members: VoA VoXyD; Vicomte Vampyr Arkames
- Website: www.adinferna.com

Ad Inferna is a French gothic/black metal and darkwave/gothic-industrial band consisting of members VoA VoXyD and Vicomte Vampyr Arkames (ex Seth), formed in 1998.

== History ==
Their debut album L'Empire des Sens was released in 2001 (recorded at Excess Studio in 1999, the Netherlands, mastered at Kohlekeller Studio, Germany) under the German label Last Episode first, then under Silverdust GmbH, a division of the German label Metal Blade. The band was programmed at the Summer Breeze Festival in Germany in 2002, sharing stage with Dimmu Borgir, Nightwish, Tiamat and The Gathering. In 2001, the band was confirmed on a European tour with the Norwegian bands Ancient and Windir. The band split up in 2003 after several financial problems with their first label Last Episode.

In 2009, after 7 years without performing, the band reformed leaving aside their symphonic black metal style for an industrial metal sound. This resulted in the album Trance n' Dance, recorded, mixed and mastered by Neb Xort (Anorexia Nervosa) at the Drudhenhaus Studio in France. The band signed with Aural Music / Dreamcell11 and got distributed by Soolfood. The album features 12 tracks including collaborations with bands such as Reaper, Soman, Combichrist and Beborn Beton.

In 2010, Ad Inferna signed a three-album contract with the American label Nilaihah Records. The album DSM was released, co-produced and mastered by Vasi Vallis (Frozen Plasma, Reaper, NamNamBulu).

In 2011, Ad Inferna released the album There Is No Cure, an album which occasionally returned to their black metal roots. The album features Kari Berg (formerly of Ashbury Heights) and Zombie Girl.

In 2012, the band decided to create their own label DSM Music, in association with Audioglobe managing the distribution. Ultimum Omnium was released on this label the same year.

In 2013, the band released their album Im Mortelle featuring female vocals from Melissa Ferlaak (ex Visions of Atlantis, ex Aesma Daeva), Alina Dunaevskaya (Markize), Annie Bertram and MyLucina. The album was deemed "Album of the week" by Orkus magazine in March 2013.

The band signed a deal with the growing label Advoxya Records in Hungary and release Opus 7: Elevation.

Ad Inferna disbanded in April 2015. VVA decided to stop his musical career while VoA VoXyD decided to create the band Sollertia (Apathia Records) together with James Fogarty (In the Woods...).

In 2019, the band released a new album, Des Diables et des Dieux with the original line-up.

== Discography ==
- Des Diables et des Dieux [CD] [dsm1901] - DSM Music - March 2019
- Opus 7: Elevation [CD] [AD-HUN-87-CD] - Advoxya Records - May 2014
- Im Mortelle [CD] [dsm1301] - DSM Music, Audioglobe - January 2013
- Ultimum Omnium - The Black Edition [CD] [dsm1202] - DSM Music, Audioglobe - May 2012
- Ultimum Omnium [CD] [dsm1201] - DSM Music, Audioglobe - April 2012
- There is No Cure [CD] [nr049] - Nilaihah Records - April 2011
- DSM [CD] [nr046] - Nilaihah Records - August 2010
- Trance :N: Dance [CD] - Aural Music / DreamCell11, Soolfood - September 2009
- Sexual Music for Sexual Mass [Digital] - Aural Music / DreamCell11 - 2009
- L'Empire des Sens [CD] - Last Episode / Silverdust / Metal Blade / Irond, M10 - 2001

== Members ==
=== 1998–2002 ===
- V. Orias A. (VoA VoXyD): guitars, bass
- Vicomte Vampyr Arkames: vocals
- Asmody: keyboards
- N. Aboriim: drums

=== 2007–2009 ===
- VoA VoXyD: guitars, keyboards
- Vicomte Vampyr Arkames: vocals
- M. Hide: bass
- Asphodel: vocals
- VNA: drums

=== 2010–2015 ===
- VoA VoXyD: guitars, keyboards, programming
- Vicomte Vampyr Arkames: vocals
- Asphodel: vocals on DSM

=== 2019 ===
- V. Orias A. (VoA VoXyD): guitars, bass
- Vicomte Vampyr Arkames: vocals
- Asmody: keyboards
- N. Aboriim: drums

== Collaborations ==
- Morfeus (Limbonic Art, Mayhem, Viper Solfa): on "L'Empire des Sens" and "Opus 7 Elevation"
- Aldrahn ( Dodheimsgard, Zyklon-B, Thorns): on "Ultimum Omnium"
- Marco B. (Obsidian Gate): on "L'Empire des Sens"
- Robynne Leah: on "L'Empire des Sens"
- Vratyas Vakyas (Falkenbach): on "L'Empire des Sens"
- Lindsay Schoolcraft (Cradle of Filth): on "Opus 7 Elevation"
- Melissa Ferlaak (Aesma Daeva, Visions of Atlantis): on "Opus 7 Elevation"
- Sanna Salou (Orakle): on "Opus 7 Elevation"
- Kari Berg (Ashbury Heights): on "There is no Cure"
- Zombie Girl: on "There is no Cure"
