= Erotic Elk =

Swedish electronic music band

Erotic Elk is a Swedish band making electronic music. The band was founded in the beginning of 2009. Their debut album, Design With Circuitry, released by Major Records was well received:

"Erotic Elk deals with pure synthpop music and the least I can say is that this album sounds like a real revelation to me! The main characteristic and strength of this album is its production. The sound is incredibly powerful and I think it's an essential element for qualitative pop music."

== Members ==
- Tomas Gustafsson
- P-O Gustafsson
- Fredrik Sigeback

== Discography ==
- Design With Circuitry (2010)
- Solitary (2011) - (mixed and mastered by VoA VoXyD from Ad Inferna)
