= Silent Scream =

Silent Scream(s) or The Silent Scream may refer to:

== Film and television ==
- Silent Scream (1979 film), an American slasher film
- The Silent Scream, a 1984 American anti-abortion film
- Silent Scream (1990 film), a British biographical film about murderer Larry Winters
- Silent Scream, a 1999 film starring Dana Plato
- Silent Scream (2005 film), an American slasher film
- "Silent Screams" (Swamp Thing), a 1991 TV episode

== Music ==
=== Performers ===
- Silent Screams, an English metalcore band formed in 2007
- Paperplane Pursuit, previously Silent Scream, a 2009–2019 Malaysian rock band

=== Albums ===
- Silent Scream (album), by Shooting Star, 1985
- Silent Scream (Dr. Sin album) or the title song, 1996 Japanese version of the 1995 album Brutal
- Silent Scr3am, by Elysion, 2009
- Silent Screams, by Éowyn, or the title song, 2008

=== Songs ===
- "Silent Scream", by Richard Marx from Paid Vacation, 1994
- "Silent Scream", by Slayer from South of Heaven, 1988
- "Silent Screams", by Halford from Resurrection, 2000

== Literature ==
- Silent Scream, a 2009 Anna Travis novel by Lynda La Plante
- Silent Scream, a 2015 Kim Stone novel by Angela Marsons
- The Silent Scream, a 1993 Nightmare Hall novel by Diane Hoh
