= Trinity (Visions of Atlantis album) =

Studio album by Visions of Atlantis
- Released: 25 May 2007
- Genre: Symphonic power metal
- Length: 47:37
- Label: Napalm/SPV

Visions of Atlantis chronology
Cast Away (2004)	Trinity (2007)	Delta (2011)

Trinity is the third studio album by Austrian symphonic metal band Visions of Atlantis, released on 25 May 2007 in Europe and 5 June 2007 in the US. It features American vocalist Melissa Ferlaak.

== Reception ==
Professional ratings
Review scores
Source	Rating
About.com	3.5/5 stars
Metal Hammer Germany	3/7

The album received a mixed reception by critics. About.com's reviewer marked strong influences of Nightwish to the band and wrote that the album, although well done, was not very original. A review by the German edition of Metal Hammer concluded that, at the time, the band had not yet written any remarkable song. The style was called kitschy, and singer Melissa Ferlaak's voice was criticised for being too "fairy-like" when compared to the male vocals by Mario Plank. The Sonic Seducer was, however, positive about the album and wrote that Visions of Atlantis had matured. In contrast to Metal Hammer, the Seducer's reviewer praised Ferlaak's voice as powerful.

== Track listing ==
No.	Title	Length
1.	"At the Back of Beyond"	3:28
2.	"The Secret"	4:10
3.	"Passing Dead End"	4:24
4.	"The Poem"	5:24
5.	"Nothing Left"	3:10
6.	"My Darkside Home"	4:05
7.	"Wing-Shaped Heart"	4:37
8.	"Return to You"	5:14
9.	"Through My Eyes"	4:13
10.	"Flow This Desert"	4:43
11.	"Seven Seas"	4:09
