= Maxi Nil =

Greek singer (born 1981)

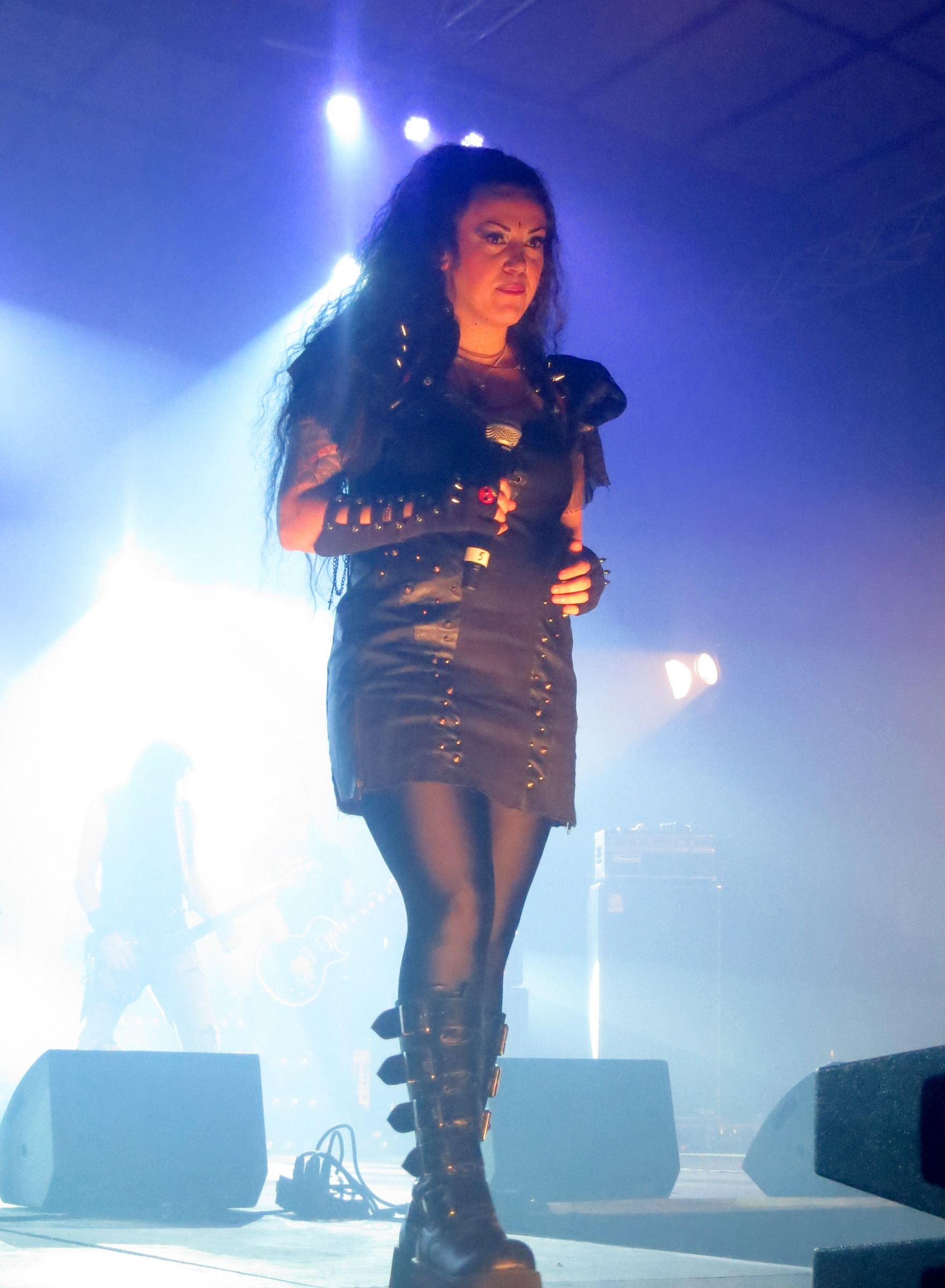
- Maxi Nil performing with Eve's Apple at MFVF in 2013

Background information
- Also known as: Maxi Boulougari
- Born: 4 June 1981 (age 45); Athens, Greece
- Genres: Rock; gothic metal; symphonic power metal
- Occupations: Singer-songwriter, musician
- Instruments: Vocals; piano; guitar; flute
- Years active: 2003–present
- Label: Napalm
- Website: Maxi Nil's Official Page

Maxi Nil (Greek: Μάξι Νιλ, born 4 June 1981) is a Greek singer, and the lead singer of Greek power metal band Jaded Star. Maxi is best known for her work as lead vocalist in the Austrian symphonic metal band Visions of Atlantis from mid 2009 to late 2013. In 2003 she joined the Greek metal band On Thorns I Lay and in the same year she also joined the band Elysion as both a singer and a songwriter.

== Musical career ==
Born and raised in Athens, Maxi's love for music started at the age of nine. She took flute, guitar and piano lessons and at the age of 16 she joined her first rock band as a singer-songwriter.

In 2003, she joined her first Greek-based gothic rock band On Thorns I Lay, in the band, she recorded one album which was expected to be released in 2010 until their label closed down, and the album has not been revealed yet, but still already recorded and waiting to be released.

In the same year while being with Thorns I Lay, she also joined the band Elysion as singer-songwriter. In 2008 after recording their first album, Maxi parted ways with the band and the album was released with another singer in 2009.

Maxi's career as a singer, she supported Amorphis in 2004, The Gathering in 2007, Diary of Dreams in 2008, Tarja Turunen in Vienna, sharing the stage with Star Industry in the song "Last Crusades" which is also included in their live album called "Black Angel White Devil," and singing twice on stage with Moonspell in Athens. In February 2009, while working on her solo project, she also supported the Dutch band Agua de Annique.

In 2008, after leaving Elysion, Maxi sent an email to Napalm asking them if there was a band looking for a singer. A few hours later she had gotten an answer, a week later she went there to meet with Visions of Atlantis and played at Metalcamp with Satyricon, Testament and Blind Guardian. In June 2009 Maxi officially became the new vocalist for Visions of Atlantis.

With Maxi as their new vocalist, the band was finally able to release their fourth album "Delta", which was released worldwide through Napalm Records at the end of February 2011. And the album gained great feedbacks and receptions. Also with the band's latest "Maria Magdalena EP" which was released on 21 October 2011.

On 27 January 2012, the band and her official Facebook had announced the title "Ethera" for their upcoming Album which was released on 22 March 2013.

On 6 December 2013, Visions of Atlantis announced on their Facebook page that Maxi, along with remaining members, departed with the band as the only founder member and drummer Thomas Caser, wanted the band to revert to its original roots from the beginning. At the same time Maxi published a statement on her Facebook page that she thanks Visions of Atlantis after being together for five years, and highly supports and respects the decision and now will be focusing on her new project Jaded Star, of which she remains the lead singer till present day (2015). In that capacity she has performed with the band supporting Epica in March 2015. In May 2015, she held the opening act alongside guitarist Kostas Vrettos for Anneke van Giersbergen unplugged appearance.

== Discography ==
=== Elysion ===
Demos:

- Demo (2007)

=== Visions of Atlantis ===
Studio Album:

- Delta (2011)
- Ethera (2013)

EPs:

- Maria Magdalena EP (2011)

=== Eve's Apple ===
Compilations:

- Siren's Garden (2012) (track 12: "Cave Behind the Waterfall")

=== Jaded Star ===
Studio Album:

- Memories from the Future (2015)
- Realign (2020)

=== Guest appearances ===
- Rest in Keys (Bob Katsionis, Vocals on "Another World", 2012)
- The Bivouac (Vexillum, Additional vocals on "The Oak and Lady Flame", 2012)
