= On Thorns I Lay =

Greek death-doom band

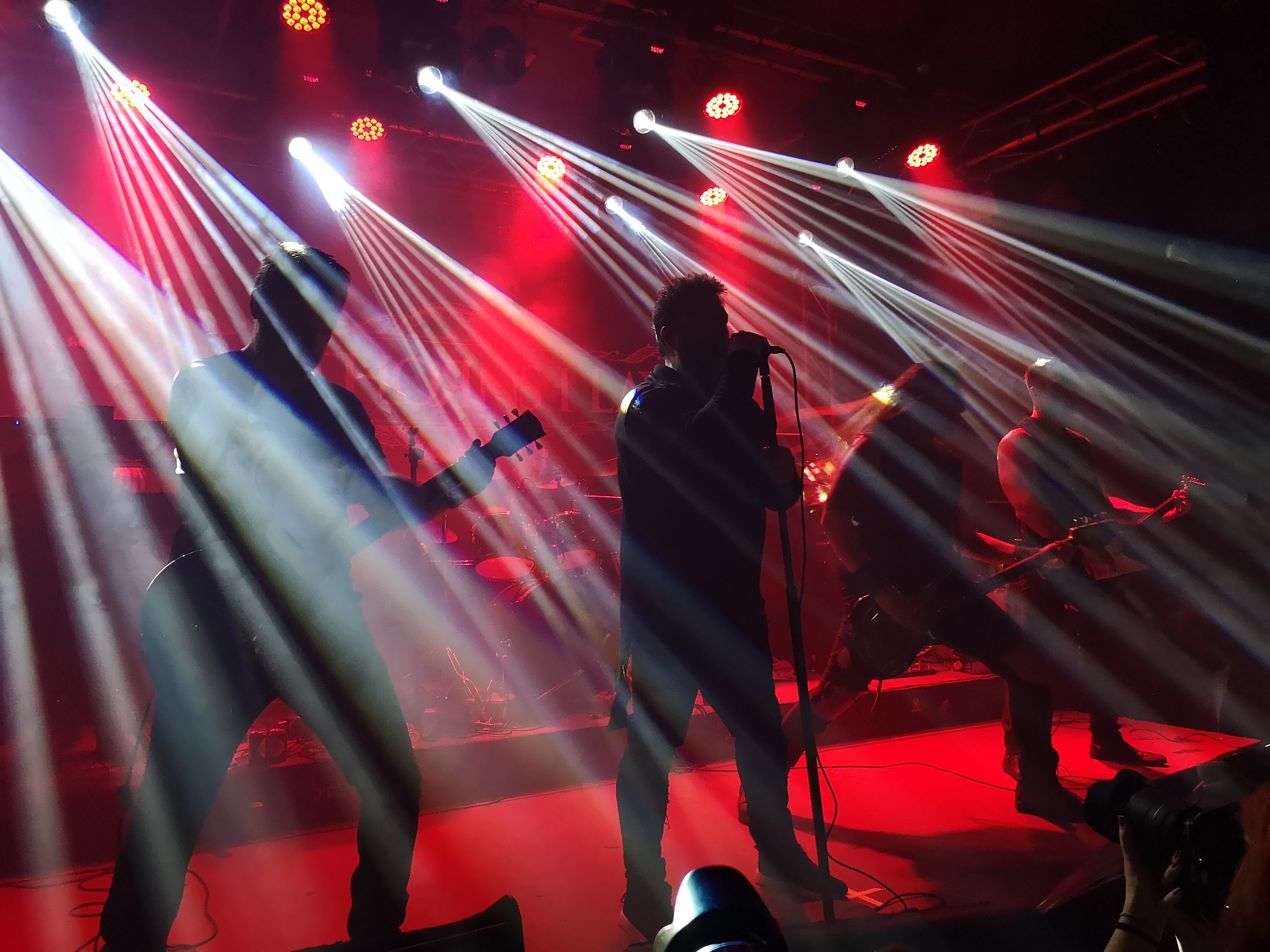
- On Thorns I Lay in 2019 at Demon's Gate Festival in Athens, Greece

Background information
- Also known as: Paralysis, Phlebotomy
- Origin: Athens, Greece
- Genres: Death-doom; gothic metal
- Years active: 1992–2006, 2015–present
- Labels: Molon Lave Records; Holy Records; Black Lotus Records; Sleaszy Rider Records; Alone Records; Lifeforce Records; Season of Mist
- Members: Peter "Invoker" Miliadis; Chris Dragamestianos; Nikolas Perlepe; Antonis Ventouris; Stelios Darakis
- Past members: Stefanos Kintzoglou; Akis Pastras; Giannis Koskinas; Maxi Nil; Jim Ramses; Minas Ganeau; Fotis Chondroudakis; Thanazis Hatzaiagapis; Elena Doroftei; Georgia Grammatikou; Claudia J. Marcela Buruiana; Roula Mamalis; Andrew Olaru; Ionna Doroftei
- Website: onthornsilay.live

On Thorns I Lay is a Greek death-doom and gothic metal band founded in Athens in 1992. The group has gone through different stylistic facets throughout its career, starting with death metal in their early days, then transitioning to a blackened death-doom symphonic style with their first EP, and later embracing atmospheric doom-death in their early albums and later gothic metal with their subsequent albums. On Thorns I Lay is among the bands of the first major gothic doom wave that systematized the principle of contrasting vocals known as the "beauty and the beast" style that became popular in the late 1990s. Towards the end of the first part of their career in the early 2000s, they shifted towards a more stripped-down and introspective rock-metal style.

The band went on hiatus in 2006, for almost ten years. They reunited in 2015 and gradually returned to the doom-death style of their beginnings. They have released four albums since their reunion, the most recent of which was released in October 2023. It is noteworthy that the group experienced a split in 2021–2022. Several of its members, including the singer, guitarist, and former drummer, left the band to reform their original band, Phlebotomy, thus reactivating a previous incarnation of the group under which they also released a record in 2023.

Through the years, the band's played in Greece and in Europe together with Dream Theater, In Flames, Anathema, Amorphis, Katatonia, Tiamat, The Gathering, Satyricon, Septic Flesh and many more.

== History ==
=== First period: Early years (1992–1997) ===
The band was founded in 1992 under the name Paralysis at the same time as their colleagues Rotting Christ, Septic Flesh, Necromantia, and Nightfall. They started making a name for themselves in the local and underground scene of that time. The group, consisting of three members at the time, played in the style of brutal death metal. They recorded a demo under this name, titled Beyond Chaos. Since there was another Dutch band with the same name, they changed their name to Phlebotomy in 1993, in reference to the medical practice of bloodletting, which seemed fitting for the death music they played. The group expanded their ranks at this point, becoming a quintet that added two new members, Andreas Bereris and Tolis. Under this name, they recorded two promos and an EP titled Dawn of Grief, which gained some success for a demo and sold almost 2000 copies. Their record explores a form of atmospheric doom-death with symphonic elements and occult moods, enriched with ethereal female voices and brutal deep voices, inspired by the sound of early albums by bands like Celestial Season, The Gathering, and others.

Over time, their style evolved, and they felt the need to change their name again, this time to On Thorns I Lay (1994). The term comes from a quote by Shakespeare and was suggested by Efthimis Karadimas, the vocalist of the Greek band Nightfall. In 1994, the band released a new demo titled Voluptuous, which caught the interest of the French label Holy Records and led to a contract with the band. This allowed the group to realize their first album, Sounds of Beautiful Experience (1995) which was recorded at the Storm studio The album includes several of their earlier songs written for their demos, with new arrangements that fit the band's evolving style. It is characterized by an atmospheric and experimental death-doom with influences of black metal, cold wave, and a symphonic touch. With this album, the band came to be associated with the extreme avant-garde metal scene of the 1990s due to its experimental and diverse character. The guitarist and main composer simply describes it as a death metal album with many atmospheric parts and an experimental touch. Their next album Orama was record at the Passion Studio and was released in 1997. Marked by the growing influence of doom-death bands like My Dying Bride, Anathema, and Paradise Lost, it marked a clear development, particularly in the contrast vocals of "beauty and beast." The band introduced a very deep growling vocal, contrasted with the melodic and oriental voices of singer Georgia Grammaticos. Their music combines influences from death-doom, gothic metal, and atmospheric layers. As noted by critics, the album creates an aquatic and nostalgic atmosphere that aligns well with the theme of Atlantis. The album was well received by the press, acknowledging the significant evolution of the band. For instance, in a review from that time, journalist Nicolas Radegout commented:"

"After two years of absence, the Greeks of On Thorns I Lay present their second album. While their first attempt didn't truly convince, Orama is more enticing. Their atmospheric death metal has significantly matured, and you can feel that each composition has been carefully pondered and balanced. Everything seems to have been carefully pondered and balanced. The combination of soprano singing and death metal works well, the guitars are crystalline, enhancing the melodies, and the keyboards add to creating the atmospheres. Everything comes together to evoke, in a misty reverie, the myth of Atlantis. In short, atmospheric death metal at its finest.

During this time, the band also recorded a song for the Holy Bible compilation of their label titled the Lyries of Eoulous and a cover version of Paradise Lost's True Belief for the tribute album As We Die for Paradise Lost.

=== Second period: The Romanian period of the band (1998–2002) ===
In 1998, the founding members of the band departed from their native country to pursue their studies in Romania in the field of medicine. The bassist explained that they made this choice due to the complexity of the Greek university system for enrollment. According to him, this clarifies the reason why many young Greeks opt to head to Bucharest for their studies. Consequently, they were compelled to part ways with their drummer Fotis and vocalist Georgia Grammaticos. Their keyboardist Roula Mammalis, who was the girlfriend of guitarist Chris, had previously departed from the group following their breakup. During their stay, they developed connections with local bands, particularly the Romanian doom-death group known as GOD - the Barbarian Horde. They would later recruit several members of this band for the recording of their upcoming album: Andrei (Andrew) Olaru (drums), Elena Doroftei (viola), and her sister Ionna Doroftei (keyboards), all hailing from the Moldavian city of Iași and pursuing classical music education at the Romanian faculty of music. The group viewed these three musicians as having brought a breath of fresh air, a sort of rebirth as this combination facilitated the fusion of Greek oriental influences with the melancholic elements contributed by the Romanian piano and viola. Apart from the performances by Helena and Ionna Doroftei along with drummer Andrew Olaru, they also enlisted the services of jazz Romanian vocalist Marcela Buruiana, who would leave her mark on the records with her gentle, angelic, and melancholic voice. Residing in the capital of Bucharest for their studies, in southern Romania, they had to regularly make train trips back and forth to reach Iași, located far to the north, where the other Romanian members of the band lived.

They recorded the album at the studio Migas Real of Bucharest in November 1998 with producer Vlad Gorginski. The new album titled Crystal Tears is released in May 1999 The year and marks a new stylistic turning point in the stylistic orientation band. In this release, the band moved away from doom-death influences and delved into a more atmospheric, introspective, and melancholic form of atmospheric gothic metal. The group claimed to have been influenced at that time by the sound of Lacuna Coil, My Dying Bride and Celestial Season. The objective was, as described by singer and bassist Stephanos Kintzoglou, "to craft a simpler, yet sadder music than ever before". The viola parts and female vocals are meant, "to immerse in despair". For this album, they took the opportunity to re-record one of the songs from their debut album (1995), which had been among the favorites of their fans, titled "All is Silent," as described by the singer and bassist. As he explained, the group had been somewhat frustrated with what they felt as poor production on the Sounds of Beautiful Experience record, and thus, they aimed to create a new version by incorporating viola parts and female vocals.

On their next album, On Thorns I Lay continues the exploration of a dark melancholy described by Tati Seiber as the "deadly silence of Romania." The music on this album is stylistically situated somewhere between the styles of My Dying Bride, Anathema, and Katatonia. Nevertheless, the band strives to develop their own originality, creating a unique sound based on the interplay of polyphonies of lead guitars in combination with keyboard and viola parts, comparable to the violin sections in the style of Celestial Season in the past. On this album, the band enlisted the services of a second singer, Claudia J., alongside Marcela Buruiana and Stefanos Kintzoglou. This provides them with the opportunity to work on arrangements with three voices. The band also engages the services of Romanian musicians Evans M (drums) and Mihai Coran (keyboard). "Future Narcotic" was recorded at the professional Magic Sound studio in Bucharest. The album Future Narcotic continues in the vein of Crystal Tears, but introduces certain experimental and ambient influences. In substance, Stefan Glas describes Future Narcotics as "a consistently high-quality album by On Thorns I Lay that reveals both old strengths and a new face." Shortly after the album's release, the band, in possession of seven tracks they had recorded for Future Narcotic but ultimately decided not to include in the album, contemplated releasing them in the form of a mini-CD. The label Holy Records displayed reluctance and instead preferred to incorporate them into a new extended edition of Future Narcotic, despite the reservations of the group, who were uneasy about requiring fans to pay again for a portion of the tracks they already had. Following their announced decision to return to Greece after completing their studies, the Romanian members of the band, Claudia J. and their drummer Evan, chose to leave the group as they did not share the band's intention to follow them to Greece.

In the year 2002, the band recorded with their fifth album named titled Angel Dust, still inspired by the dark and melancholic atmosphere they had experienced in Romania. They adopted a more stripped-down approach, where the violin, keyboards, and female vocals played a lesser role. Heavily influenced by Katatonia, the band aimed to reduce these elements, as they had grown weary of them, and preferred to play a pure and melancholic style of metal. However, their music retains certain elements of their previous albums, with occasional appearances of Buruiana's female vocals and Elena Doroftei's viola lines. At the conclusion of their studies, they returned to Greece after completing the album.

=== Third period: Return to Greece (2002–2006) and hiatus (2006–2014) ===
Upon the completion of their studies in Romania, the band made their way back to Greece, shortly after recording Angel Dust. Although it was recorded in Romania, it was released after they had returned to Greece. Back in Greece, the band formed a more stable lineup by re-enlisting their original drummer, Fotis Hondroudakis, and forming a quartet with a second guitarist, Minas Ganeau, who also became the vocalist. During this time, Stefanos relinquished the role of the singer to the newcomer. They began rehearsing, playing some concerts in Greece, and starting to write the next album. Recording of the album began in November 2002 and was completed by September 2003. The composition of the album was a collective effort this time. Previously, Dragmestianos had written the majority of the pieces and collaborated with the other members on the arrangement work, but this time all four members participated in the composition process, contributing their own ideas. The band stated that during this phase, they were still inspired by Katatonia, as well as The Gathering, Opeth, Porcupine Tree, and also alternative/grunge bands like Staind, Pearl Jam, and Alice In Chains. The new album Egocentric, released in 2003, already distinguishes itself with a completely different production compared to the previous one. While the music remains centered around aggressive guitars, the band describes it as even more melancholic and featuring more variations in melodies and guitar riffs. The album also presents a different concept from Angeldust.

The album was mixed and mastered under the supervision of the producer Fredrik Nordström. This collaboration was facilitated by their label, Black Lotus Records. Despite challenges such as Nordström's busy schedule, logistical complications, and the fact that the band couldn't be physically present during production due to their daily medical obligations, the band decided to trust Nordström's expertise. They transmitted audio tracks and mixing instructions via email since being on-site wasn't possible, ultimately receiving the finished album within a week. Although the result deviated from their original expectations, they agreed that it is a remarkable and exceptionally professional creation, comparable to other renowned works. They released their album, titled Egocentric, again under the label Black Lotus Records. This album confirms a new stylistic direction marked with an even more pronounced influence from Katatonia and alternative rock. Female vocals were nearly absent in this album. In Egocentric, bassist Kintzoglou handed over the vocals to Minas. Due to their medical professions, they were unable to go on tour and only performed a few concerts at festivals To convey the album's aesthetic directions, critics often describe the record in terms of the noticeable distance it holds from the style developed in their album Crystal Tears, such as: "Since 1999's 'Crystal Tears', which delighted fans of the genre with its beautiful Gothic metal melancholy, female vocals, and violin parts, On Thorns I Lay has nowadays focused more on clean male vocals and Katatonia-style riffs. Enhanced with a few modern influences, the listener gets a hefty dose of dark metal thrown their way, which, while not original, certainly has its charms." Thom Jurek from the Allmusic platform describes the album as:

another giant leap for the band both musically and aesthetically. While evolution seems to be the m.o. for this fine band, even fans could not have anticipated the startling growth this time out. OTIL can no longer be consigned to the doom and goth metal ghettos, judging by this new slab. If anything, like Katatonia and Opeth, OTIL have busted the genre wide open and simply make deeply moving, dynamic, heavy rock music. Crystal clean vocal production, varying tempos, and a complexly textured mix of sheer instrumental and songwriting prowess set this band apart from many of its former peers. Lyrically, OTIL stand on the bleaker side of the divide, but this is tempered by their progressive, artful rendering of power, dynamic, range, and intensity

However, this transition to a more alternative rock sound had elicited varied reactions among critics, some praising, while others express mixed sentiments. On one side, reviewers like Thom Jurek describe Egocentric as "a collection of deeply emotional songs. They are undoubtedly dark, yet in their peculiar way, also redemptive. OTIL, along with their aforementioned peers, are capable of forging an entirely new genre from the ruins of black and death metal." On the other side, reviews such as Metal.de's review consider Egocentric "is not an album to scoff at. This needs to be made perfectly clear. The band can indeed impress with their melodic and emotional metal. However, it doesn't quite reach the level of excellence achieved by their earlier works.". During that period, the members of On Thorns I Lay were also contemplating, alongside their musical direction at the time, reforming the band Phlebotomy with the drummer of Septic Flesh, to play in a brutal death metal style influenced by Suffocation, Autopsy and Grave. They were considering recording an album. The project ultimately did not materialize, but the idea would resurface in a different form some 20 years later in 2022-23.

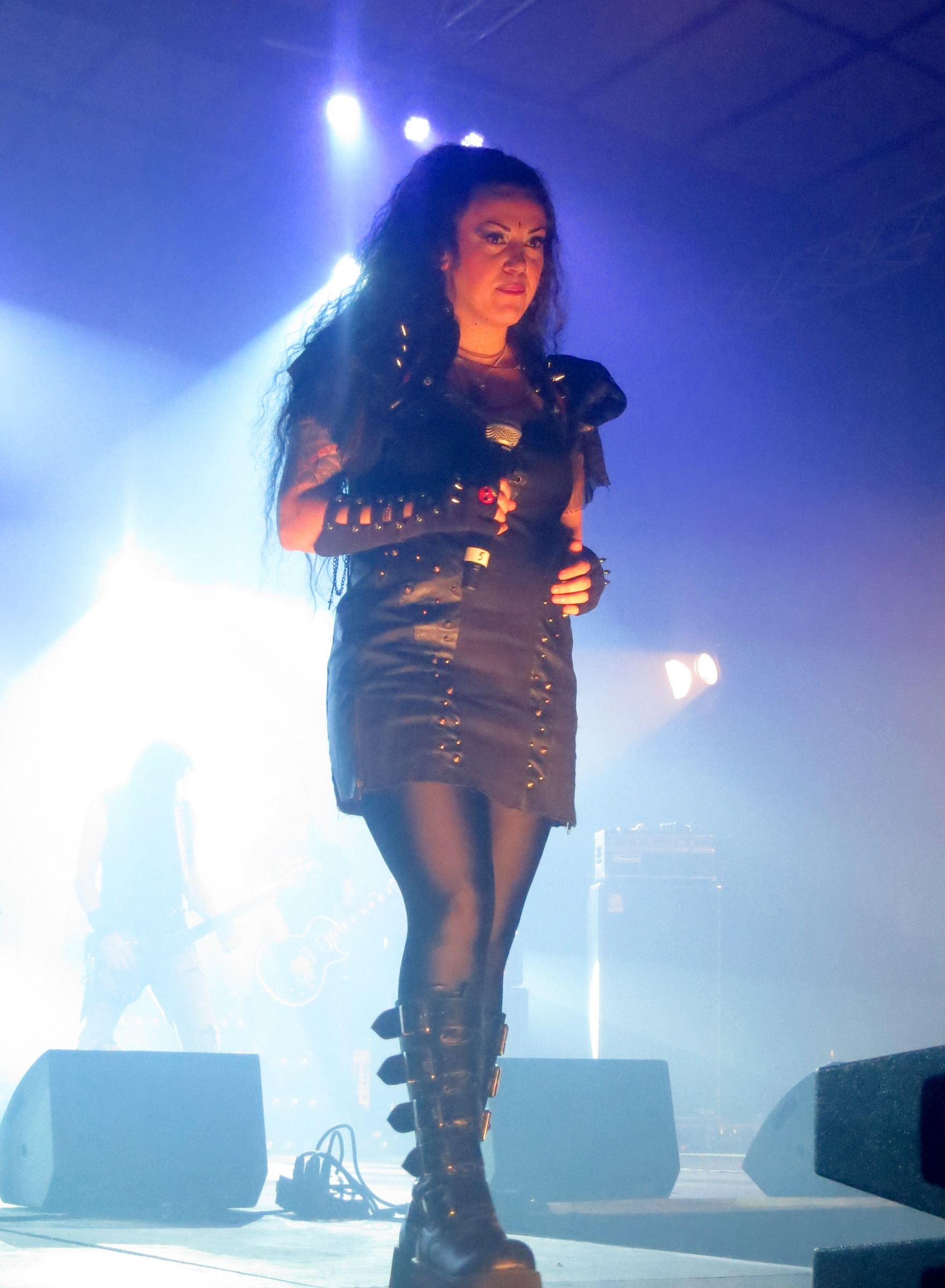
Maxi Nil (2013)

Throughout the year 2003, the band recruited vocalist Maxi Nil (future singer of Visions of Atlantis) as a live singer to support segments of their setlist requiring female vocals. As they keep playing shows, but due to their medical professions that restricted them from touring extensively, they limited their performances to a few festival concerts. In May 2003, the band officially announced on their website the permanent inclusion of Maxi Nil as a full member of the group, in preparation for their next album. In the course of 2003, after searching for a new keyboardist, they recruited Antony Ventouris. The band now consisted of six members, with the lineup of Egocentric expanded by these two newcomers. The new album, Precious Silence, was recorded between 2003 and 2004. After completing the recordings, they withdrew and the album was not released. The band was indeed in a phase of uncertainty and doubt. They felt they had lost their identity and didn't conclude the album's production. By 2005, the band ceased all activity, and their website went offline. The guitarist later revealed that they had disbanded in 2006 when he moved to Sweden for professional reasons. The band remained inactive for several years. However, in September 2010, while the band had not shown any signs of life for several years, they published a photo series of the band titled "Promo 2010", featuring the lineup of Precious Silence (Chris, Stefanos, Fotis, Antonis and Maxi), which seemed to suggest that the band might be resuming activity. But this would not have any immediate effect. In 2012, they eventually decided to release their unreleased 2004 album,Precious Silence, on the platform SoundCloud. The band reunited in 2014 when guitarist Chris Dragmestianos returned to his home country.

=== Fourth period: Reunion and return to doom-death (2011–present) ===
Between 2014 and 2015, while already composing tracks that would eventually end up on their next album in 2018, Aegean Sorrow, the band decided to remix the tracks from the 2004 recorded but unreleased album, Precious Silence. On July 16, 2015, the band announced the upcoming release on their official Facebook page: "Our new album will be out in September 2015 titled 'Eternal Silence' from Sleaszy Rider Records. It includes 9 songs, including some songs from 'Precious Silence' (unreleased album), with a new, improved mix/mastering and violins/brutal vocal parts." The album was ultimately released on November 6, 2015, under the title Eternal Silence. As announced, it mainly consisted of reworked tracks from Precious Silence with various edits, arrangements, and mixes. The vocal sections by Minas Ganeau in the original songs from Precious Silence were removed from the new mix of the tracks. They revisited the album's sound once again and aimed to bring it as close as possible to their original sound, back to the early 90s, back to their roots, as they would continue from thereon. The next album was intended, as the band explained, to establish them in this new musical era and bring them back to their original sound. In June 2017, the band announced the recording of their next album with Dan Swanö as producer and welcomed new guitarist Akis Patras:"We are happy to announce that we are in the process of reaching a new label to release our next album. We feel optimistic 'cause our new album sounds huge and we can say this is our best effort ever!!!!! Recordings took place at Devasoundz Studios by Fotis Benardo and Thanos Tzanetopoulos and mixed/mastered at Unisound Studios by the legendary Dan Swanö. The positive feedback that we receive, push ourselves to work very hard to reproduce our new stuff (...) we hope that we are gonna match the past with the future..."

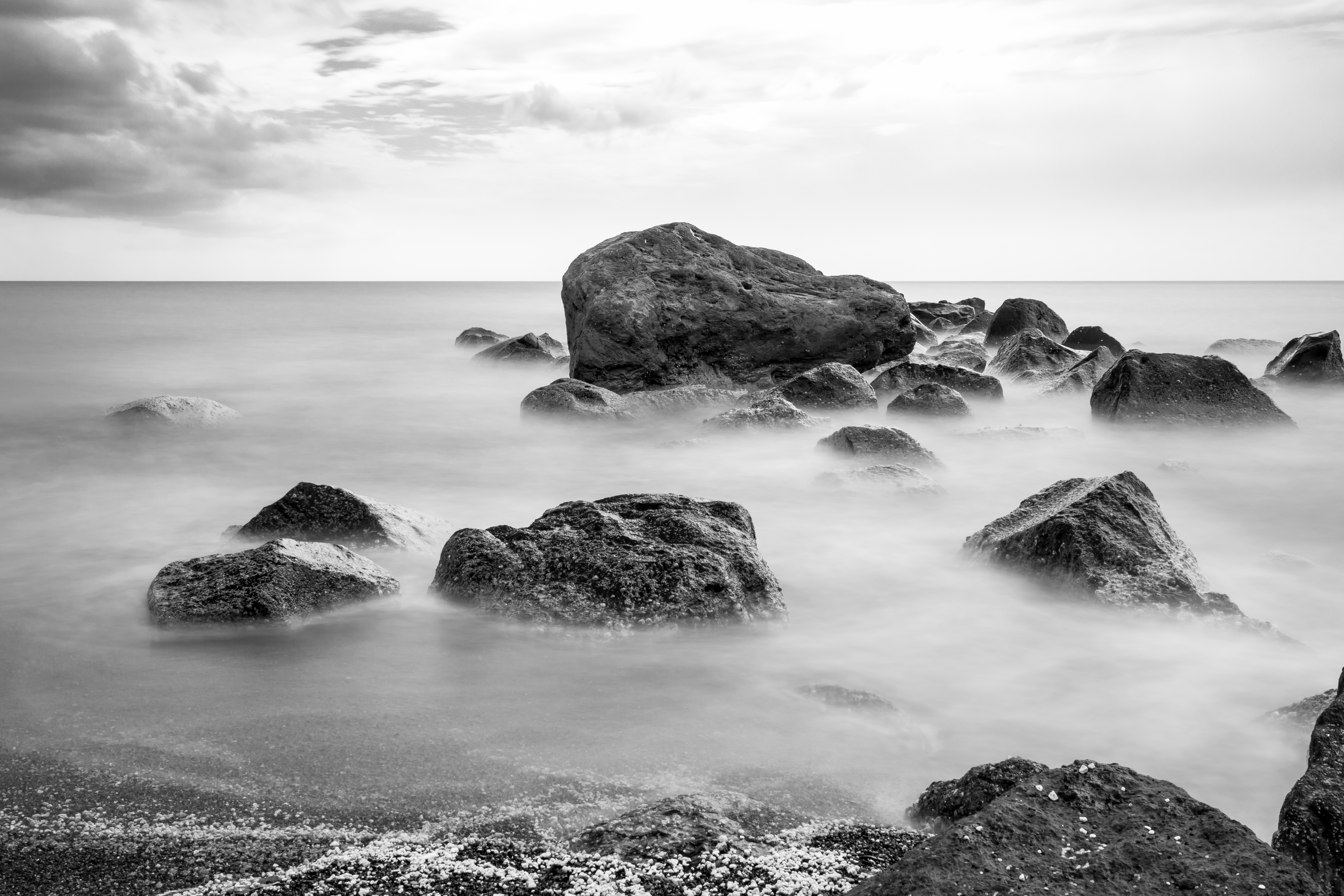
View of the Aegean Sea in 2017, central theme of the album related to humanitarian tragedies of refugees who died when trying to cross that sea.

In October 2017, the group announced the arrival of a new bassist, Jim Ramses. Stefanos Kintzoglou, who had played the bass part for the band over several decades, chose to step down to focus entirely on vocals. On March 12, 2018, they released their eighth album Aegean Sorrow, recorded at Devasoundz Studios (Rotting Christ, Septic Flesh), mixed and mastered by Dan Swanö at Unisound Studio. The album presents a deeper return to the band's atmospheric roots in Death-Doom metal. This new direction led the Rockhard Magazine at the time to consider Aegean Sorrow as one of their most extreme albums due to its darker tone and reconnection with the band's Death Metal origins. The band indeed felt that they had lost touch with their roots and needed to restore that connection. Consequently, the band decided not to use female vocals anymore, as they had done before. They aimed to create a heavy, melancholic, dark, and somber atmosphere that did not align with the use of female voices in that context. Aegean Sorrow is a concept album. It addresses, as a poetic theme, humanitarian catastrophes, misery, and the grief they felt, as well as pessimistic feelings that more of this will happen in the near future in their region. The image of the Aegean Sea on the cover is related to the concept: "The album speaks about the drama of all refugees that in their way to escape from hell died in these waters... Aegean is a water tomb where thousands of souls are lost... and we are afraid that all this will not finish soon..." The album was released on 12 March 2018.

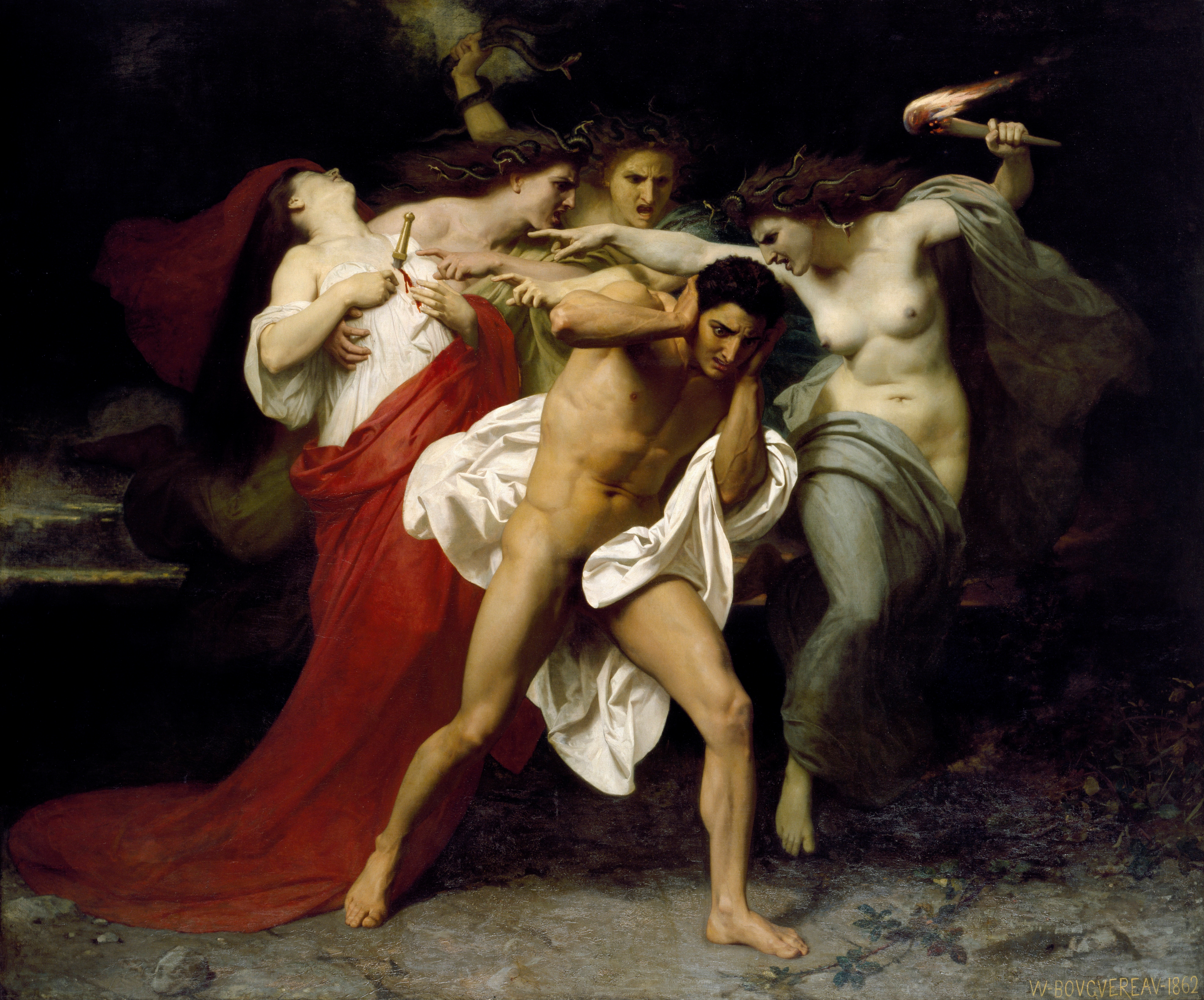
The inspirations of Greek mythology: The cover of their album Threnos (2020) depicts the Furies pursuing Orestes, similar to the painting by the French artist William Adolphe Bouguereau, Orestes and the Furies. In Greek mythology, the Furies (in Ancient Greek Ἐρινύες / Erinúes "merciless"), sometimes also called "underground goddesses" (χθόνιαι θεαί / khthóniai theaí), are deities who pursue crimes such as matricide.

In February 2018, while promoting the upcoming release of Aegean Sorrow, the band announced that they were already writing songs for the following album (pre-production phase). They planned to return to Devasoundz Studio in Athens to record in 2019. The musical direction of the next album was intended to be "doomier and heavier". Dan Swano was once again responsible for mixing and mastering, as they were satisfied with his work on Aegean Sorrow. The album was eventually recorded in March 2019, during a challenging life phase for songwriter Christ Dragmestianos, which influenced the emotional content of the music. On January 28, 2019, the band announced the departure of their long-time drummer Fotis Hondroudakis and his replacement by Stelios Darakis (drummer for Dexter Ward, Sacred Outcry). In 2019, they changed labels and joined the German label Lifeforce. On October 9, 2019, the group announced that their bassist was leaving the band after two years of collaboration. On February 21, 2020, On Thorns I Lay released their ninth studio album Threnos, a heavy atmospheric Doom-Death Metal album that follows in the footsteps of its predecessor and delves even deeper into the dark atmospheres explored by Aegean Sorrow. The music is described as a combination of "emotional melodies with aggressive and dark riffing". Although stylistically similar, the songwriter considers it slightly more aggressive and relying on a more complex song structure. On the other hand, the guitarist claims they have maintained the band's characteristic sound. The album's theme revolves around elements of Greek mythology, serving as a backdrop. This is a part of their heritage they grew up with and that has inspired them. Essentially, this theme, as Dragmestianos explains, serves as a backdrop for exploring metaphysical questions. His collaborator and lyricist Stephanos Kintzoglou crafted the narrative structure of the lyrics: "as a journey of the human soul, from birth to death. It describes the dark paths we traverse. We drew inspiration from the art of our ancestors, thousands of years ago, Greek tragedies, dramas, poems, etc." Despite the pandemic which somewhat hindered the album promotion and caused some live shows to be canceled, they received very positive responses with this release. The album garnered excellent reviews in some of Europe's major magazines, like the Norwegian Scream and Metal Storm. The album holds the third-best position in Metal Storm's 2020 album ranking, just below names like Paradise Lost's Obsidian.

In September 2021, the band announces that they are currently recording their next album Various updates about different stages of the recording follow from September to November During the recording, the band reveals a new direction in their musical evolution, mentioning that the album will incorporate an orchestra of traditional Greek folk instruments. They also unveil the thematic direction the album will take: "[it will be] very emotional for us for many reasons! Anger, Pain, Sadness, Nostalgia for our lost homelands... We wanted to capture all these emotions in the best possible way and so we used over 15 traditional instruments, which were played by some of the best professional musicians in Greece. The result makes us very proud and we really think we couldn't find a better way to express them! Some of the instruments that were used are Kanoon, Oud, Duduk, Kaval, Cümbüş and many more..." On November 29, 2021, while the recording is still ongoing, the band reveals that singer and co-founder Stefanos Kintzoglou is leaving the band after 29 years of collaboration due to "personal reasons" At the same time, the band announces the name of his successor, Petros Miliadis, who will take over the vocal duties for the upcoming album.

In 2022, Stefanos Kintzoglou reformed Phlebotomy with two former members of On Thorns I Lay, Akis and Fotis, who had also left the band some time ago. Phlebotomy was the previous incarnation of On Thorns I Lay in the 1990s, under which they had released their debut EP and second demo. In March 2023, the reformed lineup released the EP and their early demos, remastered as a compilation album titled From Golgotha We Rise. On the side of On Thorns I Lay, the band embarked on a tour in the Baltic states alongside the band Rotting Christ in December 2022. On this occasion, it was announced that guitarist Nikolas Perlepe (Yoth Iria and Dimlight) had joined the group to fill the position of lead guitarist, which had been vacant since Akis' departure, and that the new vocalist, Petros, would also take on the role of bassist, following the departure of their bassist Giannis Koskinas.

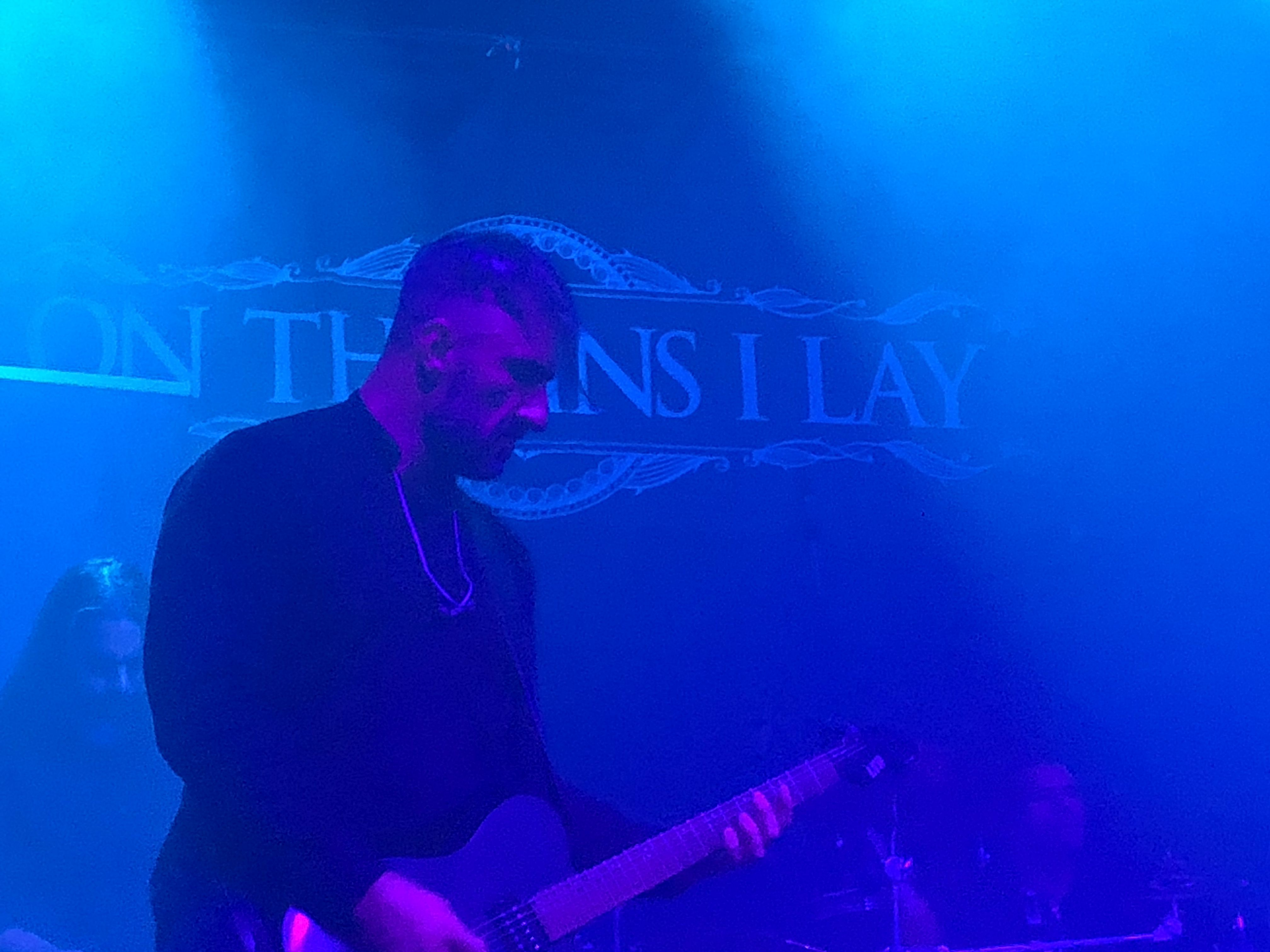
Christos Dragmestianos, On Thorns I Lay in Athens in December 2023

In 2023, they signed a deal with the French label Season of Mist. The release of the album they had recorded in 2021 was announced for 13 October 2023, under the self-titled title On Thorns I Lay, with the promotional video for the track "Newborn Skies" released on 26 July 2023. They released two new promotional clips in August 2023 for the song "Fallen from Grace" and in September 2023 for "Thorns on Fire". The new album, featuring six extended songs, was launched on October 13, 2023. Building on the already dark tones of its two predecessors, this album takes an even darker and bleaker turn, standing as the band's most ambitious project and aiming to be what they consider their best work. The album embodies an aesthetic rooted in the melodic doom-death sound the band has been cultivating in their recent releases. It incorporates various stylistic influences, including melodic death and black metal riffing, gothic melancholic melodies, symphonic orchestral arrangements, ethnic folk traditional instruments (featuring Armenian Duduk, Byzantine Kanoon, Tamboura, Oud, Kaval, and Cümbüş) and occasional female chants. Between November and December 2023, the band embarks on a tour in southeastern Europe, covering Romania, Bulgaria, and Greece, alongside Sakis Tollis (Rotting Christ), Machiavelian God, then Paradise Lost (in Greece).

== Formation ==
=== Current line-up ===
- Peter "Invoker" Miliadis (vocals) (bass in 2022)
- Chris Dragamestianos (guitar, saz)
- Nikolas Perlepe (guitar)
- Antonis Ventouris (keyboards)

=== Past members ===
==== Male lead vocals ====
- Thodoris Papadopoulos (2021) - temporary replacement guest for Live-performance in 2021
- Stefanos Kintzoglou (every album up to Threnos, except Egocentric) (1992–2021)
- Minas Ganeau (Egocentric and Precious Silence) (2003–2006)

==== Female lead vocals ====
- Ruby Bouzioti (2018) - live singer
- Anna (2015) (Eternal Silence)
- Maxi Nil (vocals) (Precious Silence and Eternal Silence) (2003–2015)
- Sofia Koutsaki (Egocentric) (2002–2003)
- Marcela Buruiana (Crystal Tears, Future Narcotics and Angel Dust) (1999–2002)
- Claudia J. (Future Narcotics) (2000–2001)
- Georgia Grammatikou (vocals on Orama) (1996–97)

==== Guitar ====
- Fillipos Koliopanos (2020–2022)
- Akis Pastras (2017–2020) (Aegean Sorrow and Threnos)
- Minas Ganeau (guitar/vocals) (Egocentric and Precious Silence) (2003–2006)
- Thanazis Hatzaiagapis (lead guitars) (Orama)

==== Viola ====
- Elena Doroftei (on Crystal Tears, Future Narcotics and Angel Dust) (1999–2002)

==== Violin ====
- Alex Papadiamantis (2018–2020) (Threnos)
- Labros Kiklis (2015–2017) (Eternal Silence and Aegean Sorrow)

==== Keyboard ====
- Roula Mamalis(keyboards, 1997) (Orama)
- Ionna Doroftei (1999, 2001–2002) (Crystal Tears and Angel Dust)
- Mihail Coran (2000–2001) (Future Narcotics)
- Dimitris Leonardos

==== Bass ====
- Stefanos Kintzoglou (every album except Sounds of Beautiful Experience, Aegean Sorrow, Threnos) (1992–2021)
- Giannis Koskinas (bass) (2020–2022) (On Thorns I Lay 2023 album)
- Jim Ramses (2017–2019)
- Michael Knoflach
- Kosta Mexi (2023–2024)

==== Drums ====
- Fotis Hondroudakis (1995–1997; 2002–2019) (Sounds of Beautiful Experience, Orama, Egocentric, Precious Silence, Eternal Silence, Aegean Sorrow)
- Evans M. (2000–2002) (Future Narcotics and Angel Dust)
- Andrew Olaru (1999) (Crystal Tears)
- Fernando Drăgănici
- Stelios Darakis (2019–2025)

== Discography ==
- Dawn of Grief (EP under their former name Phlebotomy) (1993)
- Sounds of Beautiful Experience (1995)
- Orama (1997)
- Crystal Tears (1999)
- Future Narcotic (2000)
- Future Narcotic (extended) (2001) (7 new extra-songs)
- Angeldust (2002)
- Egocentric (2003)
- Precious Silence (2004–2011) (unreleased album but available online on SoundCloud, it would eventually be reworked, edited and remixed to make a new album with it, Eternal Silence)
- Eternal Silence (2015)
- Aegean Sorrow (2018)
- Threnos (2020)
- On Thorns I Lay (2023)

== Sources ==
Books (Books in which On Thorns I Lay is mentioned as a notable band in the gothic metal genre)

- Jérôme Alberola, Les belles et les bêtes, Anthologie du rock au féminin, Camion blanc, 2012, p. 260
- Stéphane Leguay, "Métal Gothique" in Carnets noirs, éditions E-dite, 3^{e} édition, 2006, ISBN 2-84608-176-X
- Fabien Hein, Hard rock, heavy metal, metal: Histoire, cultures et pratiquants, Edition Melanie Setun, Réédition, 2019, p. 91

Biography

- Gary, Sharpe-Young (2008). "On Thorns I Lay - Rock Detector - Music Might". Archived from the original on 26 September 2012.

Interviews

- Radegout, Nicolas (May 1999). "On Thorns I Lay - Les larmes de Dracula" ["On Thorns I Lay - The Tears of Dracula"]. Hard Rock Magazine (in French). France: Compagnie de Presse et d'édition spécialisée. pp. 64–65.
- Alexopoulos, Georges (May 1999). "On Thorns I Lay - Precious Teardrops". Metal Invaders (in Greek). Greece. pp. 50–52.
- Chris Dick (2020). "Q&A: Christos Dragamestianos' On Thorns I Lay Is Reborn Again". decibelmagazine.
- Raquel Miranda (2020). "Interview with On Thorns I Lay". metalimperium.com..
- Aleks Evdokimov (2018). "Interview with On Thorns I Lay (doom-metal.com)". doom-metal.com..
- Giorgos Droggitis, Nikos Zeris (2018). "Erevos under Greek sun". rockhard.space. Archived from the original on 16 August 2023.
- Frostkamp (2004). "Interview with Minas (On Thorns I Lay)". frostkamp.wordpress.com..
- Stefan Glas (2004). "On Thorns I Lay Halbgötter". www.underground-empire.com. Archived from the original on 17 July 2011..
- Crystal Latsara (2019). "Interview with On Thorns I Lay". metalinvader.net..
- Vera, (Lordsofmetal.nl) (2004). "On Thorns I Lay - On Thorns I Lay" (in English and Dutch). Archived from the original on 25 August 2008.
- Crystal Latsara (2021). "Mini Interview with On Thorns I Lay". Metal Invaders (in Greek).
- Chelf (Metal Digest) (2023). "Embracing Gothic Thunder: An Insight into On Thorns I Lay's Self-Titled Album and 30-Year Musical Odyssey". Metal Digest.
- George Droggitis (2024). "ON THORNS I LAY interview (Chris)- Thorns on Doom". Rockhard Greece (in Greek).

Reviews

- Radegout, Nicolas (December 1997). "23 - On Thorns I Lay - Orama" ["23 - On Thorns I Lay - Orama"]. Hard Rock Magazine (in French). France: Compagnie de Presse et d'édition spécialisée. p. 81.
