= The Deep & the Dark =

Studio album by Visions of Atlantis
- Released: 16 February 2018
- Recorded: Silverlinemusic, The Scratching Tree Studio, Linz, Austria
- Genre: Symphonic metal; power metal
- Length: 41:01
- Label: Napalm Records
- Producer: Frank Pitters

Visions of Atlantis chronology
Ethera (2013)	The Deep & the Dark (2018)	Wanderers (2019)

Singles from The Deep & the Dark
- 1. "Return to Lemuria" Released: 1 December 2017; 2. "The Silent Mutiny" Released: 16 February 2018; 3. "The Deep & the Dark" Released: 18 April 2018

The Deep & the Dark is the sixth studio album by Austrian symphonic metal band Visions of Atlantis, released on 16 February 2018. It is the first studio album to feature lead singers Clémentine Delauney and Siegfried Samer.

== Reception ==
The album received mostly positive reviews. Metalfan.nl gave it 80 out of 100 points, finding the album "a solid metal record showing the strongest sides of Visions Of Atlantis". Louderthanwords.eu called the album "a nice album to dream away with, with a longing to go on an adventure, looking for hidden treasures and sunken islands", giving the album an 8,5 out of 10. Travis Green from myglobalmind.com stated "I was excited about The Deep & The Dark when I saw who the two singers were, but I would never have expected it to turn out as well as it did! Visions of Atlantis have finally reached their full potential, delivering by far their best album to date!", giving it a 9,5 out of 10.

== Track listing ==
- Lyrics by Clémentine Delauney and Siegfried Samer, except "Book of Nature", "The Last Home" and Prayer to the Lost by Clémentine Delauney.
- All music by Frank Pitters, except "Prayer to the Lost" by Clémentine Delauney.
- All arrangements by Frank Pitters.
- All vocal lines by Frank Pitters, except "Book of Nature", "The Last Home" and "Prayer to the Lost" by Clémentine Delauney.

No.	Title	Length
1.	"The Deep & the Dark"	4:07
2.	"Return to Lemuria"	4:09
3.	"Ritual Night"	3:58
4.	"The Silent Mutiny"	3:45
5.	"Book of Nature"	5:21
6.	"The Last Home"	4:14
7.	"The Grand Illusion"	3:42
8.	"Dead Reckoning"	3:52
9.	"Words of War"	3:39
10.	"Prayer to the Lost"	4:10
Total length:		41:01

== Personnel ==
Band members

- Clémentine Delauney – lead vocals, backing vocals
- Siegfried Samer – lead vocals, backing vocals
- Christian Douscha – guitars
- Herbert Glos – bass guitars
- Thomas Caser – drums

Guest musicians

- Anton Konrath – shamanic voices, additional percussions
- Frank Pitters – keyboards, backing vocals
- Mike Koren – bass guitars on album

Production

- Anton Konrath – engineer
- Dominic Sebastian – engineer
- Frank Pitters – producer, engineer, mixing
- Mika Jussila – mastering

== Charts ==
Chart (2018)	Peak position
German Albums (Offizielle Top 100)	39
Swiss Albums (Schweizer Hitparade)	94
UK Rock & Metal Albums (OCC)	39
