= Pirates II – Armada =

Studio album by Visions of Atlantis
- Released: 5 July 2024
- Genres: Symphonic metal; power metal; pirate metal
- Length: 53:04
- Label: Napalm Records
- Producer: Felix Heldt

Visions of Atlantis chronology
Pirates (2022)	Pirates II – Armada (2024)

Singles from Pirates II – Armada
- 1. "Hellfire" Released: 17 June 2025

Professional ratings
Review scores
Source	Rating
Distorted Sound	8/10
Louder Sound	4/5 stars
Sonic Perspectives	8.8/10

Pirates II – Armada is the ninth studio album by Austrian symphonic metal band Visions of Atlantis, released by Napalm Records on 5 July 2024.

== Promotion ==
The band released a live video for the song "Hellfire" on January 21, 2025. The song would then spawn an official music video, released on June 16, 2025.

To promote the album, Visions of Atlantis embarked on the "Armada over North America" tour, in which they toured North America throughout April 2025.

== Track listing ==
All lyrics are written by Clémentine Delauney.

No.	Title	Music	Length
1.	"To Those Who Choose to Fight"	Michele Guaitoli	2:14
2.	"The Land of the Free"	Clémentine Delauney, Guaitoli	4:33
3.	"Monsters"	Felix Heldt, Guaitoli	3:35
4.	"Tonight I'm Alive"	Heldt, Guaitoli	3:55
5.	"Armada"	Heldt, Guaitoli	4:01
6.	"The Dead of the Sea"	Guaitoli	7:15
7.	"Ashes to the Sea"	Guaitoli	3:37
8.	"Hellfire"	Heldt, Guaitoli	4:43
9.	"Collide"	Guaitoli	3:16
10.	"Magic of the Night"	Guaitoli	4:08
11.	"Underwater"	Guaitoli	4:17
12.	"Where the Sky and Ocean Blend"	Guaitoli	7:15
Total length:			53:02

== Personnel ==
- Clémentine Delauney – vocals (female)
- Michele Guaitoli – vocals (male), piano
- Christian Douscha – guitars
- Herbert Glos – bass
- Thomas Caser – drums

== Charts ==
Chart (2024)	Peak position
German Albums (Offizielle Top 100)	5
