= Delta (Visions of Atlantis album) =

Studio album by Visions of Atlantis
- Released: 25 February 2011
- Recorded: Dreamscape Studios, Munich, Germany
- Genre: Symphonic power metal
- Length: 41.44
- Label: Napalm Records
- Producer: Visions of Atlantis

Visions of Atlantis chronology
Trinity (2007)	Delta (2011)	Ethera (2013)

Delta is the fourth studio album by Austrian symphonic metal band Visions of Atlantis featuring the new vocalist Maxi Nil. It was released on 25 February 2011.

== Reception ==
Professional ratings
Review scores
Source	Rating
Jukebox Metal	4/5 stars
Metal Hammer Germany	5/7

The reviewers of Jukebox Metal and Sonic Seducer agreed that new singer Maxi Nil did not reach the musical quality of her predecessor. However, the album was called a solid release and was compared to the style of Edenbridge and Epica. The German edition of Metal Hammer marked that the contrast between female voices and male growling that is typical for the genre was rather absent on this album, and wrote that Delta featured straight rock hymns instead. Their reviewer and James Donovan of Jukebox Metal found the style to be remiscent of Kamelot.

== Track listing ==
All tracks are written by Martin Harb, except where noted

No.	Title	Length
1.	"Black River Delta" (Werner Fiedler, Mario Plank, Marcus Steinberger)	4:34
2.	"Memento"	6:38
3.	"New Dawn"	2:59
4.	"Where Daylight Fails" (Plank, Steinberger)	4:11
5.	"Conquest of Others" (Plank, Steinberger)	5:37
6.	"Twist of Fate" (Plank, Steinberger)	4:31
7.	"Elegy of Existence"	3:36
8.	"Reflection"	4:16
9.	"Sonar"	1:27
10.	"Gravitate Towards Fatality" (Plank, Steinberger)	5:55
