= Clémentine Delauney =

French singer

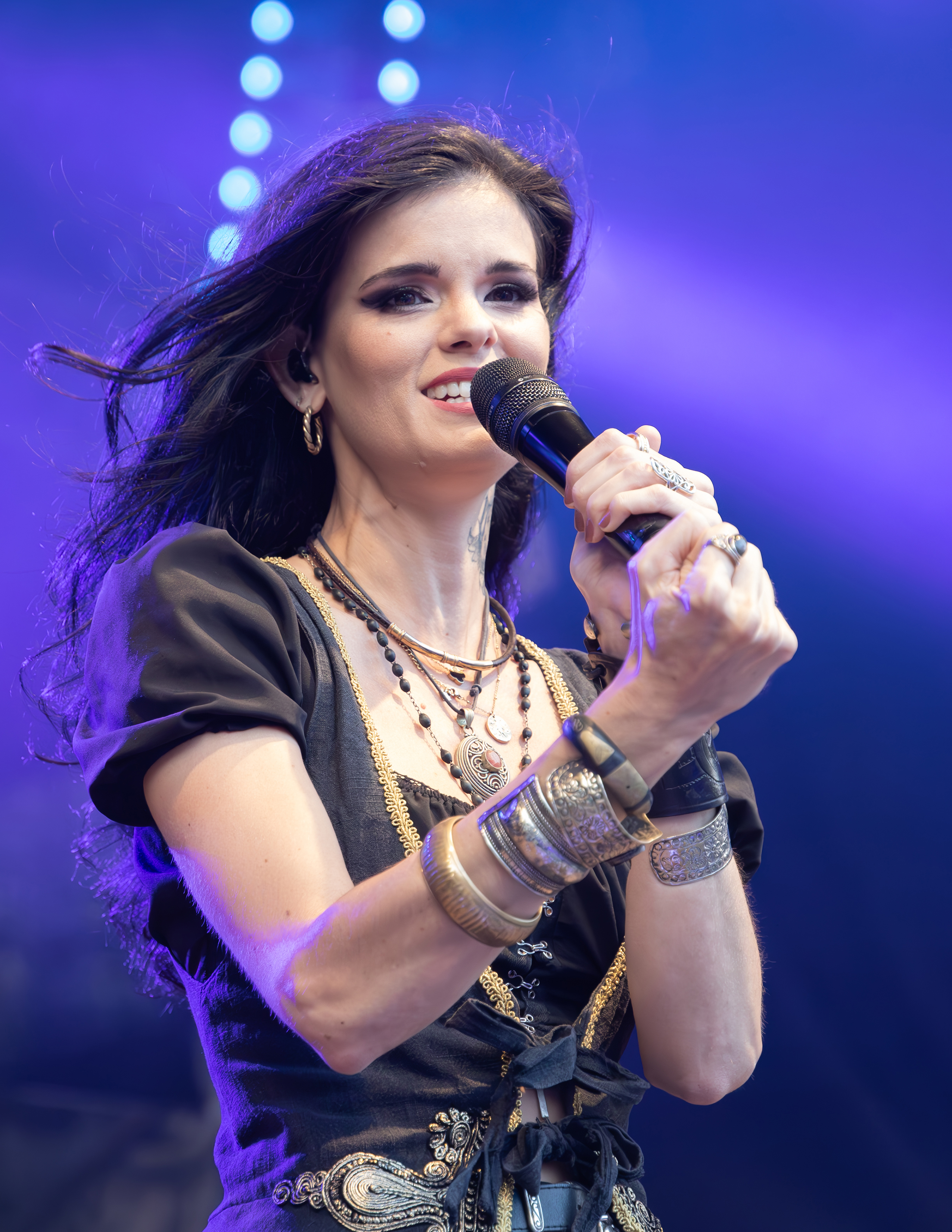
- Delauney at Metalacker festival 2023

Background information
- Born: 11 February 1987 (age 39); Paris, France
- Genres: Symphonic metal, opera metal
- Occupation: Singer
- Years active: 2009–present
- Label: Napalm Records
- Member of: Visions of Atlantis; Exit Eden
- Formerly of: Whyzdom; Serenity
- Website: clementinedelauney.com

Clémentine Delauney (born 11 February 1987) is a French heavy metal singer, best known as the current vocalist for the symphonic metal band Visions of Atlantis, and as a vocalist for the symphonic metal supergroup Exit Eden. She was previously the female backing vocalist for Austrian symphonic power metal band Serenity and the vocalist of French symphonic metal band Whyzdom.

== Career ==
At the age of 16, Clementine Delauney began her musical education at the Maîtrise de l'Opéra in Lyon.

In late 2010 she joined Whyzdom as their lead vocalist, but never appears on any record of the band, because the singer left the band in early 2012 before they began recording the second album Blind?

Back in 2011 Delauney also guest-sang on Serenity's "Out of the Dark" tour before being introduced as a permanent member in December 2013. Together with Serenity, she released the album War of Ages and the resulting music video "Wings of Madness" in 2013. In the same year it was announced that Clémentine Delauney was leaving the band and would join the Austrian band Visions Of Atlantis, in which she is still active.

Delauney performed alongside French operatic metal band Melted Space between 2013 and 2016. She can also be heard on the albums The Great Lie (released 2015) and Darkening Light (released 2018) as lead and background singer.

In 2017, the Frenchwoman founded the international metal band Exit Eden together with the 3 singers Amanda Somerville (Avantasia, Trillium), Marina La Torraca (Phantom Elite) and Anna Brunner (League of Distortion). On 4 August 2017 the four released their debut album, Rhapsodies in Black, via Napalm Records. Together the band had a few shows, including at Wacken Open Air 2018.

During the COVID-19 pandemic, Clementine Delauney launched her Patreon page in 2021. Since then she has been providing exclusive insights into the worlds of Visions of Atlantis and Exit Eden, but also into her personal artistic life. She has already released her first solo song "The Violence Within" via the platform.

=== Visions of Atlantis ===
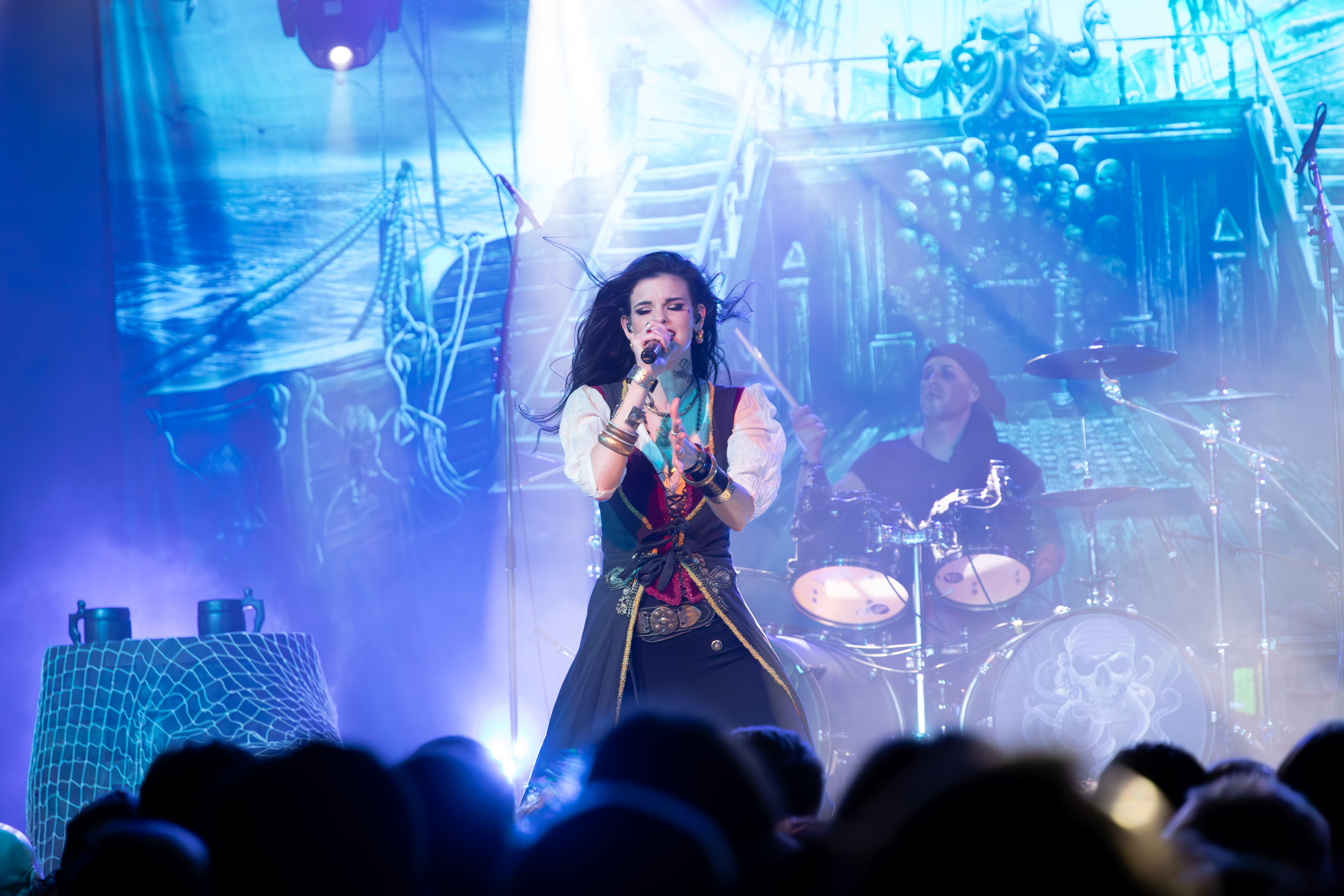
Clémentine Delauney with Visions of Atlantis live in Lindau, Germany in 2023

On 6 December 2013 it was announced via the Visions of Atlantis Facebook page that Clémentine Delauney has joined the band as the new lead vocalist, along with Siegfried Samer (who was replaced by Michele Guaitoli at the end of 2018).

Various live performances followed before the release of the Old Routes – New Waters EP in 2016, on which Delauney and Samer re-recorded some of the band's biggest hits.

The band's sixth album The Deep & the Dark followed in 2018, to which she contributed as lead singer and the main lyricist, together with singer Siegfried Samer.

Apart from writing the lyrics, Delauney is also responsible for the broad thematic universe of Visions of Atlantis, including concepts for music videos, photo shoots and costumes, which she showcased in the following years with the studio albums Wanderers (released 30 August 2019) and Pirates (released 13 May 2022). On 20 March 2024 it was announced a new album called Pirates II – Armada will be released in July 2024. Alongside with this announcement the first single, "Armada" was released via Napalm Records. This single was followed by two more, "Monsters" and "Tonight I'm Alive" before the ninth studio album was released on 5 July 2024.

=== Exit Eden ===
In 2017, Clémentine Delauney announced that she is part of the music project Exit Eden.

Together with Amanda Somerville, Marina La Torraca and Anna Brunner, the four cover well-known pop songs as metal versions. The debut album Rhapsodies in Black was released on 4 August 2017 via Napalm Records.

Delauney made several appearances with Exit Eden, including at Wacken Open Air 2018.

The music video "Run!" was released on 24 October 2023. The band's second studio album Femmes Fatales was released on 12 January 2024 and contained the band's own songs for the first time.

== Discography ==
=== Visions of Atlantis ===
Studio albums

- The Deep & the Dark (2018)
- Wanderers (2019)
- Pirates (2022)
- Pirates II – Armada (2024)

Live albums

- The Deep & the Dark Live @Symphonic Metal Nights (2019)
- A Symphonic Journey to Remember (2020)
- Pirates Over Wacken (2023)
- Armada Live Over Europe - Pt. 2 (2025)

EPs

- Old Routes – New Waters (2016)
- Armada Live Over Europe - Pt. 1 (2024)

=== Exit Eden ===
Studio albums

- Rhapsodies in Black (2017)
- Femmes Fatales (2024)

=== Serenity ===
Studio albums

- War of Ages (2013)
