= Cast Away (album) =

Studio album by Visions of Atlantis
- Released: 29 November 2004
- Genre: Symphonic power metal
- Length: 40:39
- Label: Napalm/SPV

Visions of Atlantis chronology
Eternal Endless Infinity (2002)	Cast Away (2004)	Trinity (2007)

Cast Away is the second studio album by Austrian symphonic metal band Visions of Atlantis, released in 2004.

== Reception ==
Professional ratings
Review scores
Source	Rating
AllMusic	3/5 stars
Metal Hammer Germany	5/7

Metal Hammer Germany wrote that the album was arranged rather simple and less spectacular than contemporary releases by Nightwish or Within Temptation. Some refrains and intros of Cast Away were even criticised for being almost kitsch. The reviewer was however positive about singer Nicole Bogner's evolution since the previous album.

According to AllMusic's reviewer, the album was an indecisive mix of Nightwish and Evanescence. He wrote that both Nicole Bogner's operatic singing and Mario Plank's "pop-oriented" performance made the band lose its musical identity but also opened it for a wider audience.

The Sonic Seducer delivered a positive review, marking an increased quality of performance since the band's debut album. The reviewer lauded the symphonic sound arrangements and Bogner's soprano voice.

== Track listing ==
No.	Title	Length
1.	"Send Me a Light"	4:38
2.	"Cast Away"	4:38
3.	"Lost"	3:58
4.	"Realm of Fantasy"	3:58
5.	"Pharaoh's Repentance"	4:27
6.	"Winternight"	5:37
7.	"State of Suspense"	4:42
8.	"Lemuria"	3:41
9.	"Last Shut of Your Eyes"	4:56

Bonus music video
No.	Title	Length
10.	"Lost"	3:55

== Credits ==
- Alex Krull (narrator)
- UE Nastasi (mastering)
- Eric Philippe (artwork)
- Eric Philippe (cover design)
- Eric Philippe (logo)
- Toni Härkönen (photography)
