= Pirates (Visions of Atlantis album) =

Studio album by Visions of Atlantis
- Released: 13 May 2022
- Genre: Symphonic metal; power metal; pirate metal
- Length: 58:06
- Label: Napalm Records
- Producer: Felix Heldt

Visions of Atlantis chronology
Wanderers (2019)	Pirates (2022)	Pirates II – Armada (2024)

Pirates is the eighth studio album by Austrian symphonic metal band Visions of Atlantis, released by Napalm Records on 13 May 2022.

== Reception ==
The album received mostly positive reviews. Blabbermouth.net said the album "Pirates begins with a wonderful showcase for the whole band's talents. Modestly epic but blessed with a lethal chorus, it designates the sweet spot where Visions of Atlantis feel most potent: big tunes, plenty of bombast and grandeur and occasional hints of something deeper and more atmospheric shimmering away at the fringes", giving the album an 8 out of 10. The Metal Protocol stated "Pirates certainly puts their vocals to maximum use. A number of the songs put the vocals front and center, with the band largely sitting in the background. Not a bad thing on those ballads and signature moments with the use of 2 ultra talented vocalists up front", giving the album an 8.5 out of 10. Metal-Rules said of the album, "Melody is the foundation these tunes are built upon, and the album flows naturally and logically from track to track like scenes from a movie. There are moments of sheer headbanging glory complete with anthemic hook laden sing-along choruses followed by sense-tingling melancholic moody passages", giving the album a perfect 5 out of 5.

== Track listing ==
No.	Title	Writer(s)	Length
1.	"Pirates Will Return"	Clémentine Delauney	6:07
2.	"Melancholy Angel"	Delauney, Heldt, Felder	3:55
3.	"Master the Hurricane"	Delauney, Guaitoli, Samer	7:18
4.	"Clocks"	Delauney, Guaitoli, Samer	3:55
5.	"Freedom"	Delauney, Heldt, Guaitoli, Samer	4:01
6.	"Legion of the Seas"	Delauney, Guaitoli, Samer	4:35
7.	"Wild Elysium"	Heldt	4:15
8.	"Darkness Inside"	Heldt, Felder	4:30
9.	"In My World"	Guaitoli	5:25
10.	"Mercy"	Delauney, Heldt, Guaitoli	4:27
11.	"Heal the Scars"	Delauney, Heldt	3:55
12.	"I Will Be Gone"	Heldt	5:37
Total length:			58:06

== Personnel ==
Band members

- Clémentine Delauney – female vocals
- Michele Guaitoli – male vocals
- Christian Douscha – guitars
- Herbert Glos – bass
- Thomas Caser – drums

== Charts ==
Chart (2022)	Peak position
German Albums (Offizielle Top 100)	17
