= Wanderers (album) =

Studio album by Visions of Atlantis
- Released: 30 August 2019
- Genre: Symphonic metal; power metal
- Length: 55:43
- Label: Napalm
- Producer: Frank Pitters

Visions of Atlantis chronology
The Deep & the Dark (2018)	Wanderers (2019)	Pirates (2022)

Wanderers is the seventh studio album by Austrian symphonic metal band Visions of Atlantis, released by Napalm Records on 30 August 2019.

== Reception ==
The album received mostly positive reviews. Tuonela Magazine described the album “Not all those who wander are lost” – the infamous quote by author J.R.R Tolkien, describes the general idea of the album's concept. VISIONS OF ATLANTIS’ seventh album offers a fascinating musical and lyrical journey across the untamed seas along a powerful path towards self-discovery". Tuonela Magazine also stated, "Visions of Atlantis have managed to create beautiful melodies, carried by the amazing duets between Clémentine Delauney and Michele Guaitoli. “Wanderers” offers the listener an atmospheric journey, with its grand orchestrations, and magical soundscapes. The band has managed to create an album which contains very diverse tracks, that works well as a whole."

== Track listing ==
All tracks are written by Clémentine Delauney and Frank Pitters, except where noted.

No.	Title	Length
1.	"Release My Symphony"	7:04
2.	"Heroes of the Dawn"	4:31
3.	"Nothing Lasts Forever" (Delauney, Pitters, Hartmut Krach, Mark Nissen, Andreas Schnitzer)	3:42
4.	"A Journey to Remember"	4:06
5.	"A Life of Our Own" (Delauney, Michele Guaitoli)	4:31
6.	"To the Universe"	4:11
7.	"Into the Light"	4:29
8.	"The Silent Scream"	3:59
9.	"The Siren & the Sailor"	4:42
10.	"Wanderers" (Delauney)	3:32
11.	"At the End of the World" (Delauney, Guaitoli)	3:36
12.	"Bring the Storm"	4:23
13.	"In and Out of Love"	2:53
Total length:		55:43

== Personnel ==
Band members

- Clémentine Delauney – lead vocals, backing vocals
- Michele Guaitoli – lead vocals, backing vocals
- Christian Douscha – guitars
- Herbert Glos – bass guitars
- Thomas Caser – drums

Guests/session musicians

- Frank Pitters / Keyboards (Tracks 1, 2, 4, 6-9, 11-13)
- Hannes Braun / Keyboards (Track 3)

== Charts ==
Chart (2019)	Peak position
German Albums (Offizielle Top 100)	39
