= Eternal Endless Infinity =

- 2004 reissue cover with current band logo

Studio album by Visions of Atlantis
- Released: 21 October 2002
- Genre: Symphonic metal, pop metal
- Length: 44:15
- Label: GOI Music
- Producer: Jörg Rainer Friede

Visions of Atlantis chronology
Eternal Endless Infinity (2002)	Cast Away (2004)

Professional ratings
Review scores
Source	Rating
AllMusic	3/5 stars

Eternal Endless Infinity is the debut studio album by Austrian symphonic metal band Visions of Atlantis, released in 2002. A new edition was released 29 November 2004 and contains three bonus tracks from the band's demo Morning in Atlantis.

== Track listing ==
All lyrics by Chris Kamper. All music by Visions of Atlantis.

No.	Title	Length
1.	"Intro"	0:17
2.	"Lovebearing Storm"	5:24
3.	"Silence"	5:06
4.	"Mermaid's Wintertale"	3:11
5.	"Lords of the Sea"	5:06
6.	"Seduced Like Magic"	4:57
7.	"Eclipse"	6:18
8.	"The Quest"	5:38
9.	"Chasing the Light"	4:33
10.	"Atlantis, Farewell..."	3:42
Total length:		44:15

2004 re-release demo bonus tracks
No.	Title	Length
11.	"Lovebearing Storm (original version)"	6:56
12.	"Mermaid's Wintertale (original version)"	3:28
13.	"Seduced Like Magic (original version)"	6:10

== Personnel ==
Band members

- Nicole Bogner – vocals
- Christian Stani – vocals
- Werner Fiedler – guitars
- Chris Kamper – synthesizer
- Mike Koren – bass guitars
- Thomas Caser – drums

Production

- Jörg Rainer Friede – producer, engineer, mixing
- Thomas Caser – booklet design
- Torsten Wördemann – engineer
