= Silent Scr3am =

Studio album by Elysion
- Released: 18 December 2009
- Genre: Gothic metal Alternative metal
- Length: 41:51
- Label: Massacre Records
- Producer: Mark Adrian

Elysion chronology
Silent Scr3am (2009)	Someplace Better (2014)

Silent Scr3am is the debut studio album by Greek gothic metal band Elysion, released on December 21, 2009, by Massacre Records.

In 2008 the Elysion separated their paths with Maxi Nil under good faith, and Christianna was the next frontwoman. Then they entered the studio for the recordings of debut album, which soon attracted the attention of numerous record labels, leading in signing up with Massacre Records. In the next months Elsyion completed mixing and mastering of the album with American producer engineer Ted Jensen on his owned Sterling Sound Studios.

The cover of the album is created by Natalie Shau; the artwork and photos of the booklet is a creation of Seth Siro Anton. Elysion promoted the album by touring Europe (including Greece) and North America.

== Reception ==
Professional ratings
Review scores
Source	Rating
Metal Hammer (Germany)	5/7
Sonic Seducer	favourable

Silent Scr3am received positive reviews in Germany. The Sonic Seducer lauded singer Christianna's powerful voice as well as the guitar riffs, but wrote also that the band had still to find its own style. The German edition of Metal Hammer called it a "potential sensation" although the tracks were not found to be innovative.

== Track listing ==
All lyrics are written by Maxi Nil; all music is composed by Elysion.

No.	Title	Length
1.	"Dreamer"	4:13
2.	"Killing My Dreams"	3:51
3.	"Never Forever"	3:21
4.	"Weakness in Your Eyes"	4:01
5.	"Don't Say a Word"	3:57
6.	"The Rules"	4:15
7.	"Bleeding"	3:51
8.	"Walk Away"	3:59
9.	"Loss"	3:06
10.	"Far from the Edge"	3:36
11.	"Erase Me"	5:41
Total length:		41:51

Japanese bonus track
No.	Title	Length
12.	"Don't Say a Word" (Acoustic version)	4:02

== Credits ==
=== Band members ===
- Petros Fatis – drums
- Johnny Zero – guitars, keyboards
- Antonios Bofilakis – bass
- Christiana Hatzimihali – female vocals

=== Guest/session musicians ===
- Renos Miliaris – piano (tracks 4, 10)

=== Crew ===
- Natalie Shau – cover art
- Maxi Nil – lyrics
- Spiros Antoniou – photography
- Mark Adrian – producer, mixing
- Ted Jensen – mastering
- Nick Jackson – logo
