= Ethera =

Studio album by Visions of Atlantis
- Released: 25 March 2013
- Recorded: Dreamscape Studios, Munich, Germany
- Genre: Symphonic power metal
- Length: 51.17
- Label: Napalm Records
- Producer: Cris Tian

Visions of Atlantis chronology
Delta (2011)	Ethera (2013)	The Deep & the Dark (2018)

Ethera is the fifth studio album by Austrian symphonic metal band Visions of Atlantis. It was released on 25 March 2013. It is the last album to feature Mario Plank on male vocals, Maxi Nil on female vocals, Christian Hermsdörfer on guitars and Martin Harb on keyboards.

== Reception ==
The album received generally positive reviews. Metalstorm.net gave the album a 7 out of 10, stating: "They really push the line here between symphonic metal and straight up heavy metal, the riffs and rhythms are really paramount. High-energy rockers plus some slightly cheesy ballads make for a really nice flow here. It's a classic formula with fun, catchy melodies." Metal-Temple.com gave the album an 8 out of 10, stating: "'Ethera' finds Visions Of Atlantis at their best. What began on their last record has been solidified and perfected here. Front to back this is the best release of their career". metaldivas.wordpress.com gave it 6.5 points out of 10, stating: " In overall, an interesting and pleasant album with some great moments and good vocal lines but somehow it misses its target having little to no variety".

== Track listing ==
No.	Title	Lyrics	Music	Length
1.	"The Ark"	Martin Harb	Harb	4:29
2.	"Machinage"	Harb	Harb	3:33
3.	"Avatara"	Christian Hermsdörfer	Hermsdörfer	4:50
4.	"Vicious Circle"	Hermsdörfer & Maxi Nil	Hermsdörfer	4:28
5.	"Hypnotized"	Nil	Nil	4:20
6.	"Tlaloc's Grace"	Harb	Harb	4:05
7.	"Burden of Divinity"	Joanna Nieniewska	Harb	3:38
8.	"Cave Behind the Waterfall"	Nil	Nil	3:52
9.	"A.E.O.N. 19th"	Harb	Harb	4:09
10.	"Bestiality vs. Integrity"	Harb	Harb	4:35
11.	"Cleric's Emotion"	Harb	Harb	5:08

Bonus track
No.	Title	Lyrics	Music	Length
12.	"Tlaloc's Grace (Orchestra Version)"	Harb	Harb	4:11

== Personnel ==
Band members

- Maxi Nil – vocals
- Mario Plank – vocals
- Christian Hermsdörfer – guitars
- Thomas Caser – drums
- Martin Harb - keys

Guest musicians

- Fabio D'amore (Serenity) – bass and additional vocals
- Roland Navratil (ex-Edenbridge) – drums
- Simone D'Eusanio – additional violin on "Bestiality Vs. Integrity", additional vocals on "Burden of Infinity"

Production

- Christian Hermsdörfer – producer
- Fabio D'amore – engineer
- Frank Pitters – engineer
- Ivan Moni Bidin – engineer
- Jacob Grabmayr – mixing
- Mika Jussila – mastering
- Martin Harb – cover concept
- Thomas Caser – cover concept
- Vance Kelly – cover artwork & cover concept
