= Melissa Ferlaak =

American singer

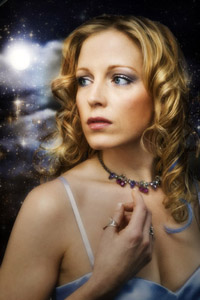

Background information
- Born: Melissa Marie Ferlaak; April 26, 1979 (age 47); Cottage Grove, Minnesota, U.S.
- Origin: Minneapolis, Minnesota, U.S.
- Genres: Symphonic metal, classical
- Occupation: Singer
- Years active: 2001–present

Melissa Marie Ferlaak (born April 26, 1979) is an American soprano, best known as the former singer of symphonic metal bands Aesma Daeva, Visions of Atlantis, and Echoterra. She is the singer of doom/death metal project Plague of Stars and the ambient band MY Eternel with Voa voxyd. She wrote the libretto and vocal parts for the opera Demandolx, and sang the role of Madeleine on the recording. She has appeared as a guest with bands such as Ad Inferna, Therion, Beto Vazquez Infinity and more.

== Career ==
Born in Cottage Grove, Minnesota, Ferlaak graduated from Park High School in 1997, and entered University of Wisconsin-River Falls. She met John Prassas who began symphonic metal band Aesma Daeva. They began a live band with Earl Root; this was her introduction to heavy metal music. Between her junior and senior years, she was invited by Aesma Daeva bandleader John Prassas to record with the band in 2001 as one of three vocalists on the album The Eros of Frigid Beauty. Ferlaak sang on the album's two epic metal compositions: "In My Holy Time" and the title track. Finishing at River Falls, Ferlaak moved to Boston for graduate studies at the New England Conservatory of Music. Prassas asked her to become sole vocalist for the group, which she did for four years, fronting the band in concert and on the albums The New Athens Ethos (2003) and Ex Libris EP (2005). She earned a master's degree at New England Conservatory.

On October 11, 2005, Aesma Daeva band announced that Ferlaak was leaving to join the Austrian band Visions of Atlantis. She performed her last show with Aesma Daeva in December 2005 at Star Central in Minnesota. The concert was filmed for the DVD, "Last Rites", and it was released in March 2007.

In 2005, Ferlaak was asked by Napalm Records to join Austrian symphonic power metal band Visions of Atlantis. In early 2006 to early 2007, Vision of Atlantis did a short European tour with Xandria. With Ferlaak the band recorded their third album Trinity, released on May 25, 2007, supported by a tour through Europe, China, and the U.S.. On November 28, 2007, the band announced that Ferlaak had departed, citing personal reasons.

In late 2009, she joined Minneapolis band Echoterra, replacing their original singer Suvi Virtanen. Ferlaak and Echoterra recorded the EP In Your Eyes which was released on January 19, 2009, and they began to perform regularly. Land of The Midnight Sun was released on October 17, 2011, through Blinding Force Recordings. On March 13, 2012, Ferlaak left Echoterra due to creative and personal differences.

Ferlaak started Plague of Stars in 2012 with Will Maravelas (We Are Legion), Aaron Lanik (We Are Legion), and Timothy Morton. The quartet released their first album, When Morning Came in 2015.

In March 2013, Ferlaak started making music with Voa voxyd from Ad Inferna. The two began a new project MY Eternel, releasing Pursuit of a Higher Throne in 2013.

In April 2014, Ancient Rites of the Moon, the first album of the Stardust Reverie Project (Graham Bonnet, Zak Stevens and Lynn Meredith among others) was released. It features Ferlaak on three songs, including "Daughter of the Sun", a tune based in an old Cherokee tale.

In June 2015, Demandolx: The First Chapter of Convent Demonic Possession was completed in which she wrote the libretto and vocal parts. She sang the role of Madeleine on the recording of the opera.

In February 2018, Ferlaak sang on Therion's opera, Beloved Antichrist in the role of Sophia.

In June 2019, Plague of Stars released Daedalus, their second full-length album with Ferlaak as lead vocalist and lyricist.

She has performed classically with such companies as Minnesota Opera, Theater Latte Da, Coro!, Thursday Musical and the Schubert Club.

== Discography ==
=== With Aesma Daeva ===
- The Eros of Frigid Beauty (2002)
- The New Athens Ethos (2003)
- Ex Libris (EP, 2005)
- Last Rites (DVD, 2007)

=== With Visions of Atlantis ===
- Trinity (2007)

=== With Adyta ===
- Rose of Melancholy (2009)
- Katarsis (2011)

=== With Echoterra ===
- In Your Eyes (EP) (2010)
- Land of the Midnight Sun (2011)

=== With MY Eternel ===
- Pursuit of a Higher Throne (2013)

=== With Stardust Reverie ===
- Ancient Rites of the Moon (2014)

=== With Plague of Stars ===
- When Morning Came (2014)
- Daedalus (2019)

=== Demandolx ===
- Demandolx (2015)
