= Elysion (band) =

Greek gothic metal band

- Origin: Athens, Greece
- Genres: Alternative metal Gothic metal
- Years active: 2006–present
- Label: Massacre Records
- Members: Nikos Despotopoulos; Johnny Zero; Christiana Hatzimihali; Andreas Roufagalas; Jannis Konst
- Past members: Antonios Bofilakis; Petros Fatis; Maxi Nil; Ilias P. Laitsas

Elysion is a Greek gothic metal band from Athens, Greece, formed in 2006.

The band members are Christianna Hatzimihali (lead vocals), Giannis "Johnny Zero" Giannikos (guitar), Andreas Roufagalas (bass guitar), Nikos Despotopoulos (guitar) and Jannis Konst (drums).

== History ==
=== Before Silent Scream ===
Elysion were founded in 2006 by guitarist Johnny Zero and singer Maxi Nil who soon welcomed the other band members on board.

They recorded and self-released a demo album in 2006/2007 with songs written by Zero & Nil. The demo generally resonated well amongst critics and received good reviews in webzines and magazines, earning "Demo of the Month" in the Greek Metal Hammer Magazine and 2 Filippos Nakas awards (Filippos Nakas Conservatory) in 2006.

In 2008 the band and Nil parted ways and Christianna joined as the next frontwoman. They entered the studio for the recordings of the debut album, which soon attracted the attention of numerous record labels, leading in signing up with Massacre Records. In the next months, mixing and mastering of the album, which consists mostly of lightly reworked and rerecorded versions of the songs on the demo album, was completed.

=== Silent Scream ===
The band released its debut studio album, Silent Scr3am, on 18 December 2009 on the Massacre Records label. It was produced and mixed by Mark Adrian and was mastered by Ted Jensen. The cover of the album is created by Natalie Shau.

The album was met with mostly average to positive reviews. Femmetal Online gave the album a high rating, stating that "[t]he songs on 'Silent Scream' are so unrelenting and infectious that I had a hard time finding any fault at all with this CD. The sound and production is excellent and the band worked with American engineer Ted Jensen." The German edition of Metal Hammer gave the album an average rating, calling it a "potential sensation" although the tracks were not found to be innovative.

=== Someplace Better ===
On 24 January 2014, Elysion released its new album called Someplace Better, produced by Mark Adrian at ARTemis Studios in Athens, Greece, mixed by Dan Certa (We Are The Fallen, Ben Moody, Seether) and mastered by David Collins (Black Sabbath, Alice Cooper, Mötley Crüe). Gustavo Sazes, who already worked for bands like Arch Enemy and Morbid Angel, is responsible for the cover artwork.

=== Bring Out Your Dead ===
The band's third album Bring Out Your Dead was released on March 17, 2023. It was produced and mixed by Mark Adrian and mastered by Nasos Nomikos. Dimitris Tzortzis is responsible for the cover art. The first release, Crossing Over, came out on February 8, 2023, while Raid The Universe was released 19 days later, on February 27. All other songs were released along with the album.

=== Identity ===
Identity is the fourth studio album by Greek gothic metal band Elysion. It was released on October 16, 2026, through Massacre Records. The album features eleven tracks, including the singles "Phoenix", "Guardian Angel" and "Dead Loves".

== Band members ==
Current

- Nikos "NiD" Despotopoulos – lead guitars (2006–present)
- Jannis Konst – drums (2023–present)
- Johnny Zero – rhythm guitars, keyboards (2006–present)
- Christianna Hatzimihali – lead vocals (2008–present)
- Andreas "AR" Roufagalas – bass guitar (2022–present)

Former

- Ilias P. "Laitsman" Laitsas – drums (2009–2023)
- Antonios "Anthony FXF" Bofilakis – bass guitar (2006–2022)
- Petros Fatis – drums (2006–2009)
- Maxi Nil - lead vocals (2006-2008)

Timeline

== Discography ==
=== Studio albums ===
- Silent Scr3am (2009)
- Someplace Better (2014)
- Bring Out Your Dead (2023)
- Identity (2026)

=== EPs ===
- Killing My Dreams (2012)

== Awards and nominations ==
Year	Nominee / work	Award	Result
2006	Elysion (demo)	Best Demo Record in Metal Hammer Greece magazine	Nominated
2006	Elysion	Best New Act in Fillipos Nakas Award	Won
2006	Elysion	Best Rock Band in Fillipos Nakas Music Award	Won

== See also ==
- List of alternative-metal artists
- List of gothic-metal bands
- List of Greek musical artists
- Music of Greece
