= Aesma Daeva =

American symphonic metal band

- Origin: La Crosse, Wisconsin, United States
- Genres: Symphonic metal
- Years active: 1998–present
- Labels: Accession Records

Aesma Daeva is an American symphonic metal band founded by John Prassas and Nick Kopernik in 1998. Their first album Here Lies One Whose Name Was Written in Water was published in 1999 by Accession Records. Soprano Melissa Ferlaak was the band's vocalist between 2001 and 2005. In 2006 she was replaced by Lori Lewis who also sang for the symphonic metal band Therion.

The band's music combines symphonic and operatic elements with metal music. They have been compared to Nightwish, with whom they performed in 2004, and Therion.

== Discography ==
- Here Lies One Whose Name Was Written in Water - 1999 (Accession Records, republished by Root of All Evil Records in 2000)
- The Eros Of Frigid Beauty - 2002 (Root of All Evil Records)
- The New Athens Ethos - 2003 (Root of All Evil Records, Scarecrow Records)
- Dawn of the New Athens - 2007 (Pnevma)
