= Visions of Atlantis =

Austrian symphonic metal band

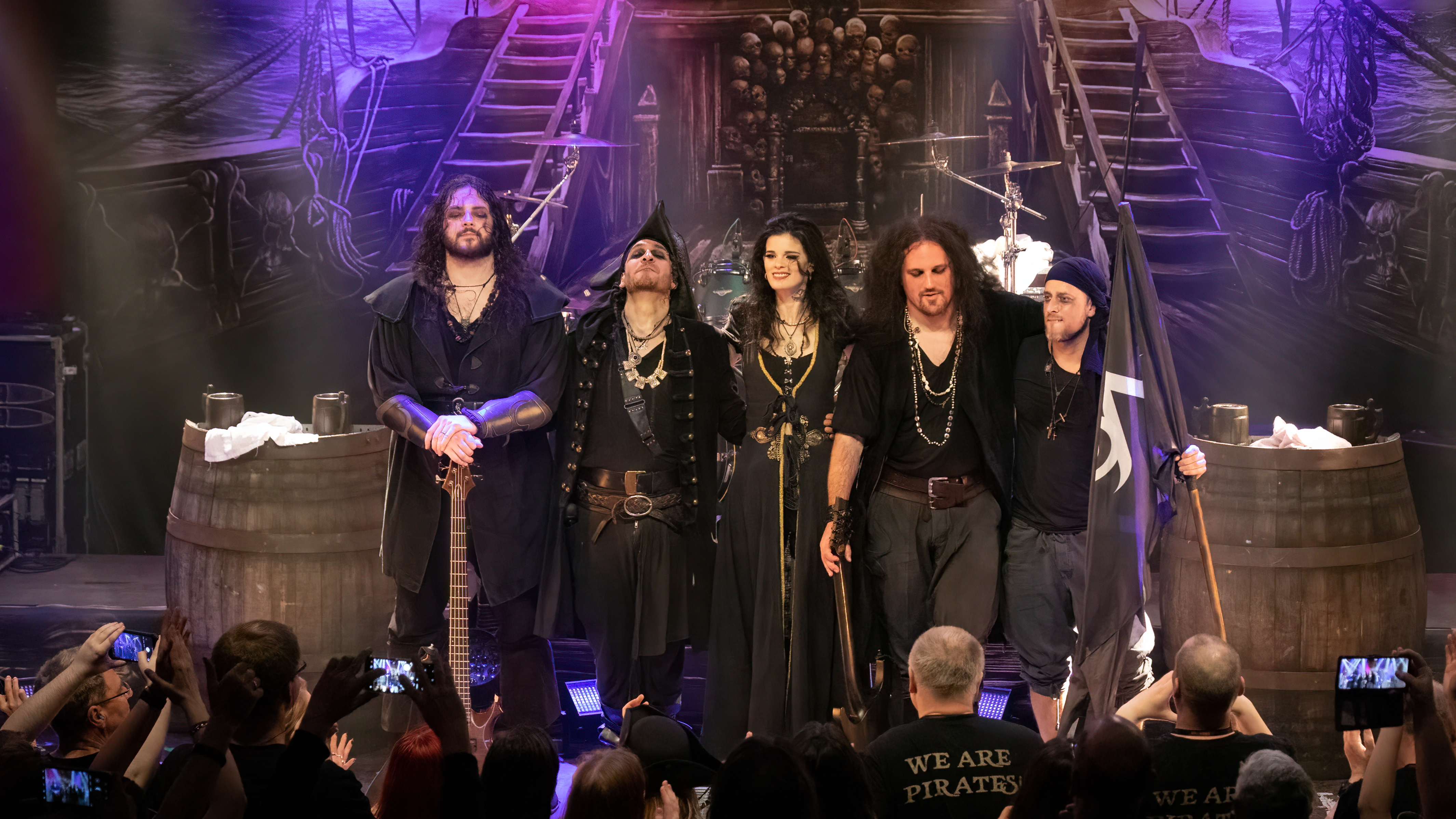
- Visions of Atlantis at Turock (Essen), Germany in 2023

Background information
- Origin: Bruck an der Mur, Styria, Austria
- Genres: Symphonic metal; power metal; pirate metal
- Years active: 2000–present
- Label: Napalm Records
- Members: Thomas Caser; Clémentine Delauney; Christian Douscha; Herbert Glos; Michele Guaitoli
- Past members: Nicole Bogner; Melissa Ferlaak; Maxi Nil; Joanna Nieniewska; Werner Fiedler; Wolfgang Koch; Christian Hermsdörfer; Mike Koren; Mario Holly; Chris Kamper; Martin Harb; Christian Stani; Mario Plank; Siegfried Samer
- Website: visionsofatlantis.at

Visions of Atlantis is an Austrian symphonic metal band formed in Bruck an der Mur, Styria, in 2000. Inspiration came both from successful Finnish symphonic metal band Nightwish and from the myth of Atlantis, as well as a pirate theme in recent albums.

== History ==
=== Eternal Endless Infinity and line-up changes (2000–2004) ===
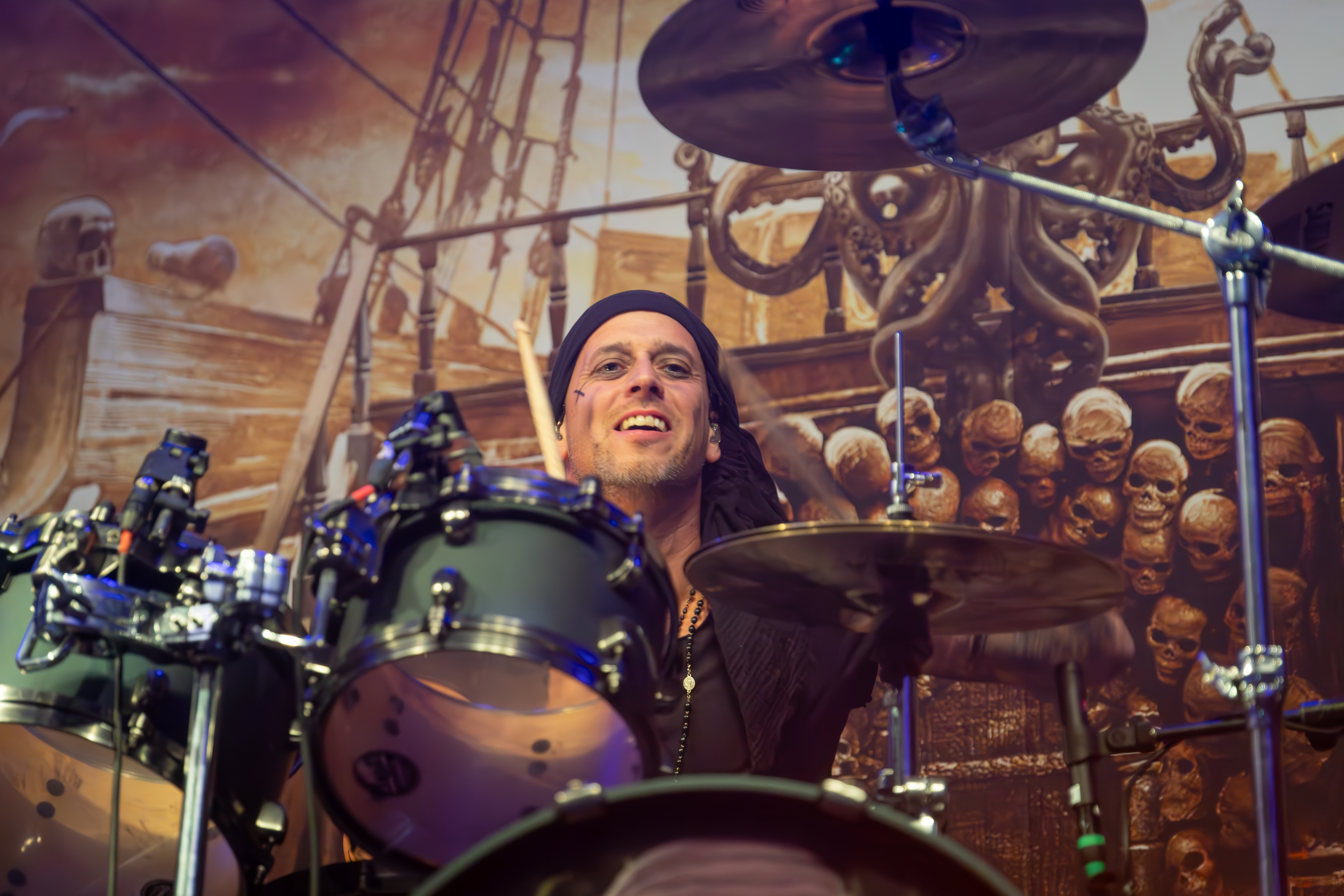
Drummer Thomas Caser, the remaining founding member of the band

Fascinated by the myth of Atlantis, Werner Fiedler, Thomas Caser, Christian Stani, and Chris Kamper decided in August 2000 to work out a concept inspired by the secret of Atlantis. Late in summer mezzo-soprano Nicole Bogner joined the project, and this was the birth of Visions of Atlantis. A first demo, Morning in Atlantis was released in 2000.

In 2001 they signed with TTS Media Music/Black Arrow Productions, and in 2002 their first album, Eternal Endless Infinity was released.

In 2003, the band saw some changes in line-up, replacing Stani with Mario Plank and Kamper with Miro Holly.

=== Cast Away and Bogner's departure (2004–2005) ===
Now with Napalm Records, which released the band's second studio effort Cast Away worldwide in November 2004. To mark the release, Visions of Atlantis produced their first official music video to the track "Lost", which received significant airplay on VIVA and MTV, and made it possible for the band to present the album. The song "Lemuria" from the album was used at the beginning of the medal ceremonies during the 2011 World Championships in Athletics in Daegu. In early 2005, Visions of Atlantis did their tour across Europe, while being supported by labelmates Elis and Celtic rock based band Lyriel.

In late 2005, Bogner left the band due to commitments elsewhere.

=== New singer and Trinity (2005–2007) ===
After Bogner left the band, she was replaced by American soprano singer Melissa Ferlaak (formerly with Aesma Daeva). Wolfgang Koch also replaced Fiedler as the band's guitarist. In 2006, Martin Harb, who previously played with the band during their 2003 tour in Mexico, replaced Holly. In May 2007, Visions of Atlantis released their 3rd album Trinity, mastered at Finnvox Studios and recorded at Bavarian Dreamscape Studio). The following autumn brought Visions of Atlantis to the United States, where the band toured together with Epica for 6 weeks and won numerous new fans.

=== Departure of Ferlaak and Koch (2007–2008) ===
Upon returning, Visions of Atlantis went through changes in the line-up. On 28 November 2007, a message was posted on the band's official website announcing that Ferlaak and Koch had left the band, both citing personal reasons. Following this, it was announced a few days later former member Werner Fiedler had rejoined as the band's guitarist.

=== Joanna Nieniewska and Maxi Nil (2008–2009) ===
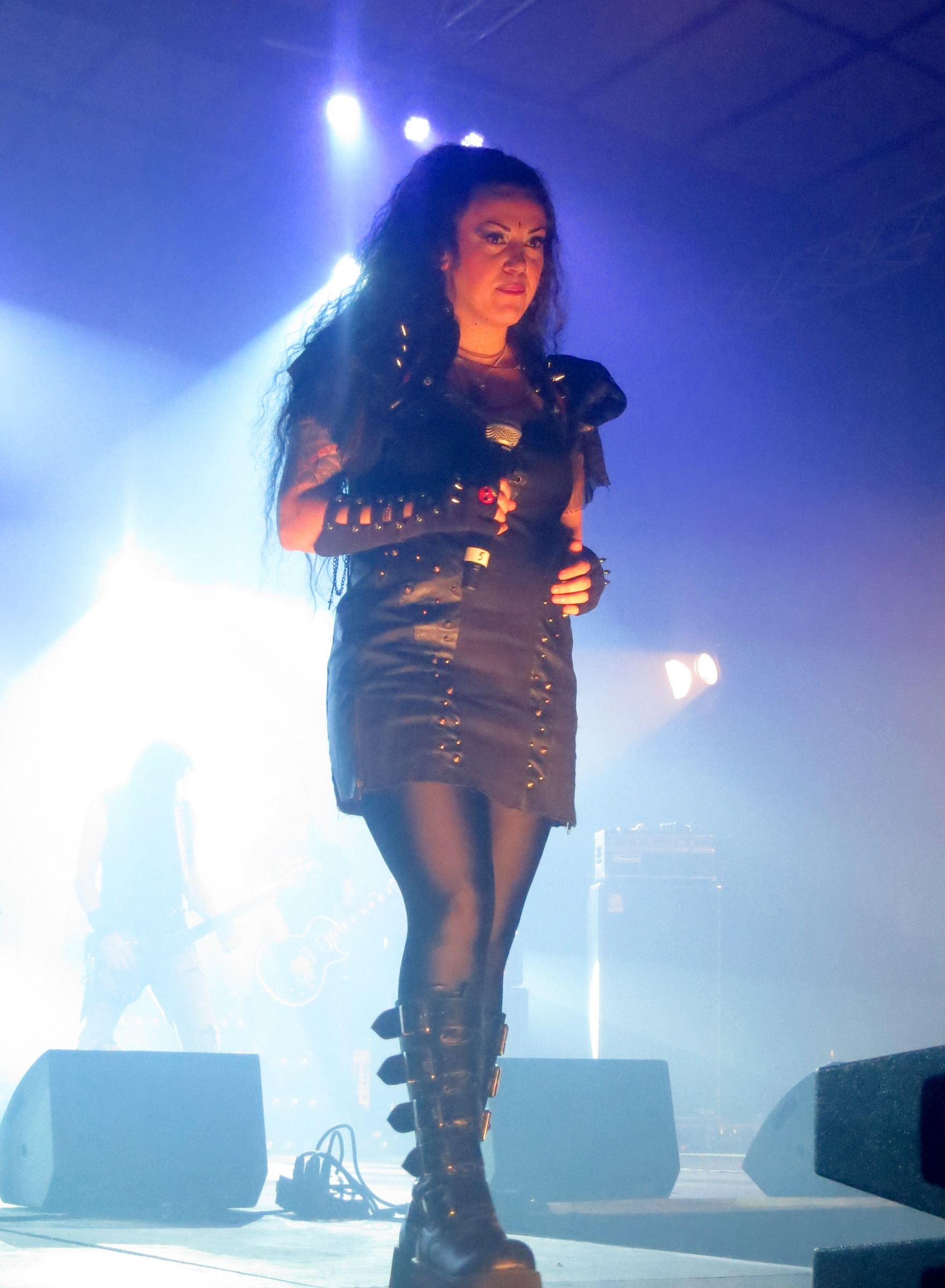
Maxi Nil was the band's vocalist from 2009 to 2013

After Ferlaak's departure, Visions of Atlantis not only looked for a replacement for a singer, but also wrote the material for the fourth album. The band advertised on their website the position for a female vocalist for several months, and on 3 September 2008, they finally announced that they had found a new female singer; however, her identity was not revealed until 1 February 2009, as the 20-year-old Austrian soprano vocalist Joanna Nieniewska.

On 29 July 2009, Visions of Atlantis announced that because of health problems, Nieniewska would no longer perform with the band, but would continue to support them from behind the scenes.

The band announced Maxi Nil (On Thorns I Lay, Ex-Elysion) as the replacement vocalist.

=== Delta and Maria Magdalena EP (2010–2011) ===
On 3 December 2010, the band announced the new title of their 4th studio album Delta which was released worldwide on 25 February 2011.

On 18 July 2011, bass player Mario Lochert left the band due to crucial internal differences. In a 2011 interview Harb said that the band was not planning on replacing him. Instead, they would continue without a bassist as a fixed band member.

In August 2011, the band announced the title of their first EP Maria Magdalena. It was released on 21 October 2011.

=== Death of Bogner and Ethera (2012–2013) ===
On 6 January 2012, Visions of Atlantis announced on their Facebook and MySpace pages that former singer Nicole Bogner had died at the age of 27 after suffering from a severe disease over a long period of time. The band said that they were saddened to have lost their first vocalist, and expressed their gratitude to Bogner for her time with the band.

On 27 January 2012, the band announced the title Ethera for their upcoming album, which was scheduled to be released in 2012. Ethera was released on 22 March 2013. It was the first album with guitarist Christian Hermsdörfer and with no official bassist. It was dedicated to Bogner's memory.

=== Line-up changes and The Deep & the Dark (2013–2019) ===
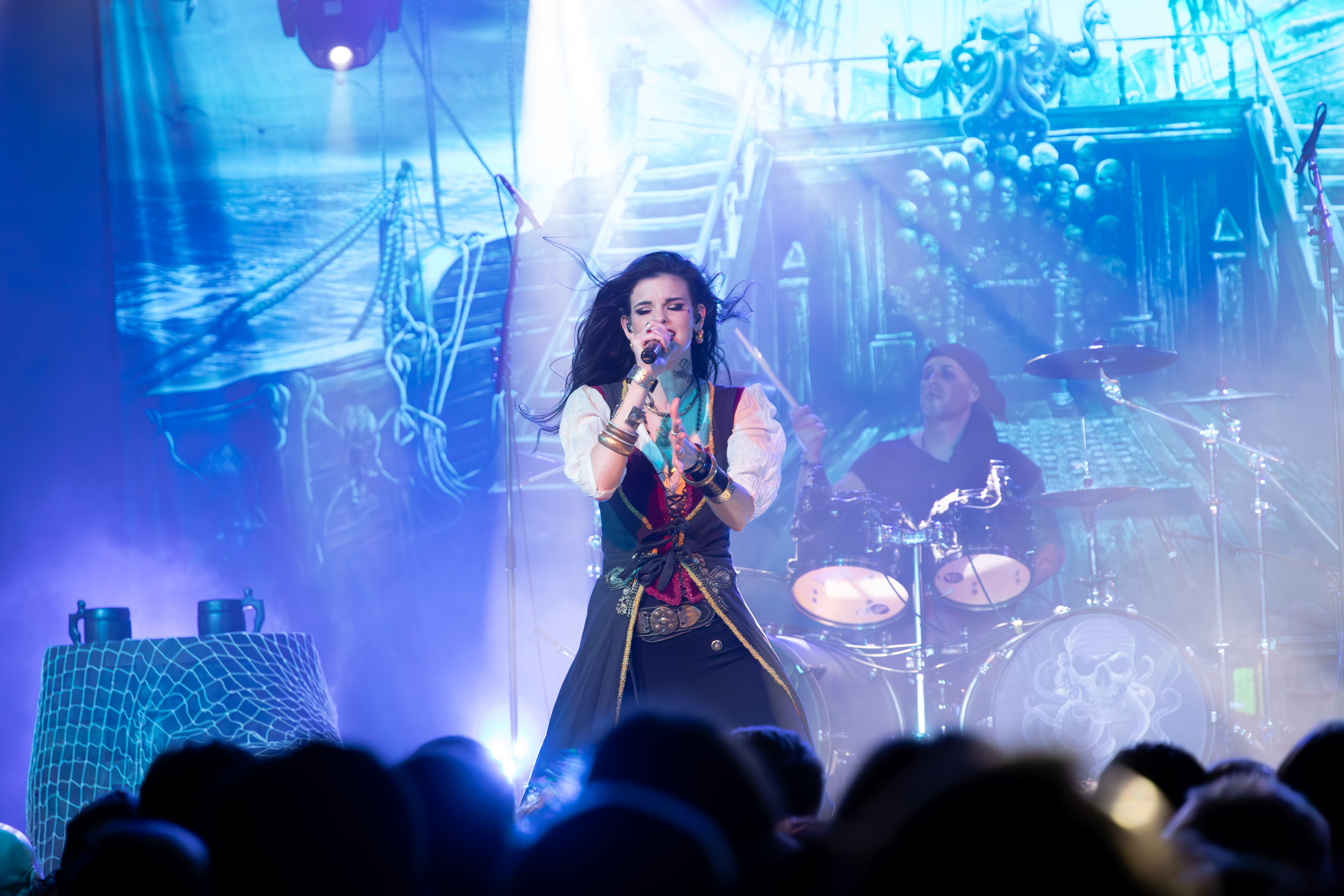
Clémentine Delauney joined the band in 2013

On 6 December 2013, Visions of Atlantis announced on their Facebook page that most of the line-up was parting ways with the band, leaving the only remaining and founding member Caser on drums. This decision was mostly because of a desire from the parting members to play their own style of music, whilst the band was orientating to go back to its classic style. Thus, it welcomed back some of its old members: Fiedler (guitars), Kamper (synths), and Michael Koren (bass). Nil was replaced by Clémentine Delauney, and Plank by Siegfried Samer. Koren was replaced by Herbert Glos on bass in late 2017, and Fiedler by Christian Douscha at the same time. Kamper left the band in 2015.

Their sixth studio album The Deep & the Dark was released on 16 February 2018.

=== Wanderers and Pirates (2019–present) ===
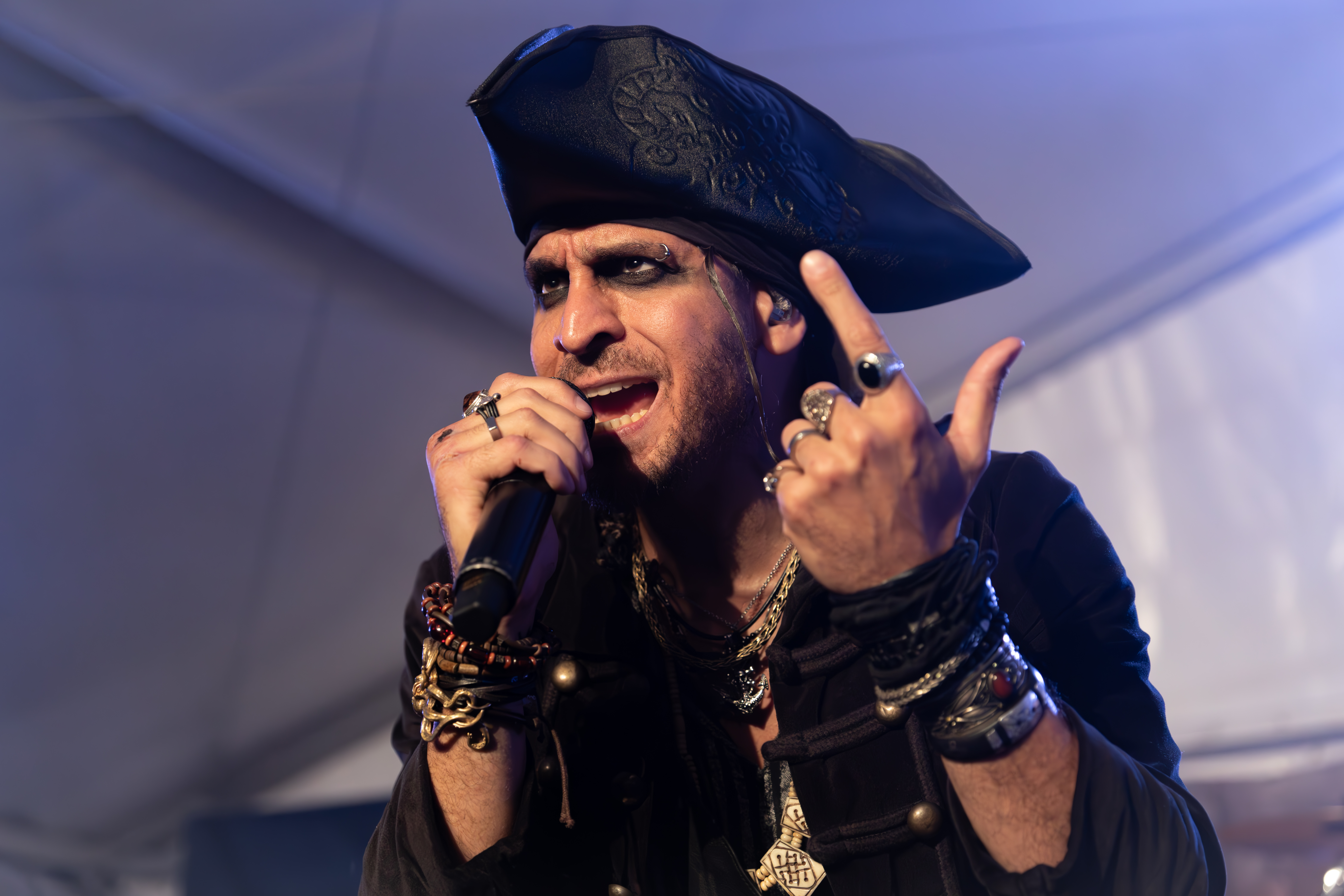
Michele Guaitoli joined the band as the male vocalist in 2018.

After extensive tours with Serenity and Kamelot as well as several festival shows in 2018, the band released their first live album The Deep & the Dark Live @ Symphonic Metal Nights on 16 February 2019, which featured new male lead singer Michele Guaitoli (from Italian symphonic metal band Temperance) sharing lead vocal duty with Samer, the former having permanently replaced the latter at the end of the Symphonic Metal Nights IV tour in late 2018.

The band released their seventh studio album Wanderers on 30 August 2019 via Napalm Records. The album again featured Delauney and Guaitoli sharing lead vocal duties.

During the pandemic in 2020, Visions of Atlantis released their first live DVD / Blu-ray with the title A Symphonic Journey To Remember on 30 October. The show was recorded at Bang-Your-Head festival in Germany back in 2019 together with the Bohemian Symphony Orchestra of Prague.

The band released their eighth studio album Pirates on 13 May 2022. This album took Visions of Atlantis to a higher level than before. With more orchestral arrangements and choirs, the band not only fascinated the fans but also received a great response from the press. The first official fan club VoA Sailors has existed since 29 August 2022.

The band released their ninth studio album Pirates II – Armada on 5 July 2024. Prior to the album's release, the band released three singles, "Armada", "Monsters", and "Tonight I'm Alive". Like its predecessor, the new record was highly praised by the press.

On 18 December 2025, the band alongside Warkings released a collaborative single, "Pirates & Kings".

== Band members ==
Current

- Thomas Caser – drums (2000–present)
- Clémentine Delauney – female vocals (2013–present)
- Christian Douscha – guitars (2017–present)
- Herbert Glos – bass (2017–present)
- Michele Guaitoli – male vocals (2018–present)

Touring

- Raphael Saini – drums (2011)
- Babis Nikou – bass, male vocals (2013)
- Sam Totman – bass (2024)

Former

- Christian Stani – male vocals (2000–2003)
- Nicole Bogner – female vocals (2000–2005; died 2012)
- Miro Holly – keyboards (2003–2006)
- Mario Plank – male vocals (2003–2013)
- Melissa Ferlaak – female vocals (2005–2007)
- Wolfgang Koch – guitars (2005–2007)
- Martin Harb – keyboards (2006–2013)
- Joanna Nieniewska – female vocals (2009)
- Maxi Nil – female vocals (2009–2013)
- Mario Lochert – bass (2009–2013)
- Christian Hermsdörfer – guitars (2011–2013)
- Werner Fiedler – guitars (2000–2005, 2007–2011, 2013–2017)
- Chris Kamper – keyboards (2000–2003, 2013–2017)
- Michael Koren – bass (2000–2009, 2013–2017)
- Siegfried Samer – male vocals (2013–2018)

== Discography ==
Studio albums

- Eternal Endless Infinity (2002)
- Cast Away (2004)
- Trinity (2007)
- Delta (2011)
- Ethera (2013)
- The Deep & the Dark (2018)
- Wanderers (2019)
- Pirates (2022)
- Pirates II – Armada (2024)

Orchestral albums

- A Pirate's Symphony (2023)
- Armada – An Orchestral Voyage (2026)

Live albums

- The Deep & the Dark Live @Symphonic Metal Nights (2019)
- A Symphonic Journey to Remember (2020)
- Pirates Over Wacken (2023)
- Armada Live Over Europe (2025)

EPs

- Maria Magdalena (2011)
- Old Routes – New Waters (2016)

Singles

- "Lost" (2004)

Videos

- "Lost" (2004)
- "New Dawn" (2011)
- "Winternight" (2016)
- "The Silent Mutiny" (2018)
- "The Deep & the Dark" (2018)
- "The Last Home" (2018)
- "A Journey to Remember" (2019)
- "Nothing Lasts Forever" (2019)
- "Legion of the Seas" (2022)
- "Melancholy Angel" (2022)
- "Master the Hurricane" (2022)
- "Clocks" (2023)
- "Armada" (2024)
- "Monsters" (2024)
- "Tonight I'm Alive" (2024)
- "Hellfire" (2025)
- "Pirates & Kings" (2025; collaboration with Warkings)

Lyric videos

- "Return to Lemuria" (2017)
- "Words of War (Live)" (2019)
- "Heroes of the Dawn" (2019)
- "A Life of Our Own" (2019)

Live videos

- "Heroes of the Dawn" (2020)
- "Release My Symphony" (2020)
- "Wanderers" (2020)
- "Pirates Will Return" (2023)
- "The Land of the Free (Live at Lyon)" (2024)
- "Monsters (Live at Nuremberg)" (2024)
- "Heroes of the Dawn (Live at Paris)" (2024)
- "Where the Sky and Ocean Blends (Live at Haarlem)" (2024)
- "Clocks (Live at Budapest)" (2024)
- "Legion of the Seas (Live at Frankfurt)" (2024)
- "The Dead of the Sea (Live at Toulouse)" (2024)
- "Underwater (Live at Lyon)" (2024)
- "Magic of the Night (Live at Essen)" (2024)
- "Pirates Will Return (Live at Munich)" (2024)
- "Melancholy Angel (Live at Vienna)" (2024)
- "Master the Hurricane (Live at Roncade)" (2024)
- "Underwater" (Live Footage Vertical Video) (2025)
