= Nemesis AD =

Studio album by Serenity
- Released: 27 October 2023
- Genres: Symphonic metal Progressive metal Power metal
- Length: 45:44
- Label: Napalm
- Producer: Sascha Paeth

Serenity chronology
The Last Knight (2020)	Nemesis AD (2023)

Professional ratings
Review scores
Source	Rating
Distorted Sound	8/10
GBHBL	9/10
Ghost Cult Magazine	9/10
Metal.de	7/10

Nemesis AD is the eighth studio album by the Austrian symphonic power metal band Serenity, released on 27 October 2023. Continuing the band's lyrical theme of historical events, this is a concept album based on Albrecht Dürer and his legacy. The album has received several positive reviews.

== Track listing ==
No.	Title	Length
1.	"Memoriae Alberti Dureri"	1:32
2.	"The Fall of Man"	4:18
3.	"Ritter, Tod und Teufel (Knightfall)"	4:24
4.	"Soldiers Under the Cross"	3:42
5.	"Reflections (of AD)"	8:06
6.	"Sun of Justice"	4:10
7.	"Nemesis"	4:17
8.	"The End of Babylon"	4:02
9.	"Crowned by an Angel"	4:14
10.	"The Sky Is Our Limit"	3:22
11.	"The Fall of Man (Orchestral version, bonus track)"	3:37
Total length:		45:44

== Personnel ==
Band members

- Georg Neuhauser - lead vocals
- Chris Hermsdörfer - guitars, backing vocals
- Marco Pastorino - guitars, backing vocals
- Fabio D'Amore - bass, backing vocals
- Andreas Schipflinger - drums, backing vocals

Additional personnel

- Sascha Paeth - producer, recording, mixing, mastering
- Roy Khan - guest vocals (track 2)
