= Engraved Within =

Demo album by Serenity
- Released: 17 April 2005
- Recorded: Munich, Germany
- Studio: Dreamscape Studios
- Genres: Progressive metal, power metal
- Length: 37:40
- Label: Napalm Records
- Producers: Georg Neuhauser; Thomas Buchberger; Mario Hirzinger

Serenity chronology
Engraved Within (2005)	Words Untold & Dreams Unlived (2007)

Professional ratings
Review scores
Source	Rating
Metal Temple	8/10

Engraved Within is a demo album by symphonic metal band Serenity released on April 17, 2005, in Europe on the Napalm Records label. The album was produced by lead vocalist Georg Neuhauser, Thomas Buchberger, and Mario Hirzinger. Artworks and layout for the album were created by Thomas Buchberger. Engraved Within received outstanding reviews all over Europe upon release. Tracks 2, 3, 4, & 6, would be remade and later appear on Serenity's album Words Untold & Dreams Unlived. Track 5, "Journey's End", would be re-recorded as a bonus track on their 2008 album Fallen Sanctuary. Track 7, "Guiding Light", would be re-recorded as a bonus track on their 2011 album Death & Legacy. This leaves the intro, "Gates to Serenity", as the only track exclusive to the demo.

== Track listing ==
No.	Title	Length
1.	"Gates to Serenity (Intro)"	1:20
2.	"Forever"	6:29
3.	"Thriven"	7:11
4.	"Engraved Within"	7:00
5.	"Journey's End"	3:59
6.	"Dead Man Walking"	4:33
7.	"Guiding Light"	7:08
Total length:		37:40

== Personnel ==
- Georg Neuhauser - lead vocals
- Thomas Buchberger - lead and rhythm guitars
- Simon Holzknecht - bass guitar
- Mario Hirzinger - keyboard, backing vocals
- Andreas Schipflinger - drums, backing vocals
- Franz-Josef Hauser - additional keyboards and piano

== Production ==
- Produced by Buchberger/Hirzinger/Neuhauser.
- All songs written by Buchberger/Hirzinger/Neuhauser except "Dead Man Walking".
- "Dead Man Walking" written by Buchberger/Hirzinger/Neuhauser and Anker.
- Orchestrations by Franz-Josef Hauser
- Recorded at Serenity Dungeon Wörgl, Giant Hall Studio, and Avalon Studios Kramsach
- Drums recorded by Gottfried Plank at Hyperion Studios Schwaz
- Mixed and mastered by Jan Vacik at Dreamscape Studios in Munich.
