= Warkings =

German/Austrian power metal band

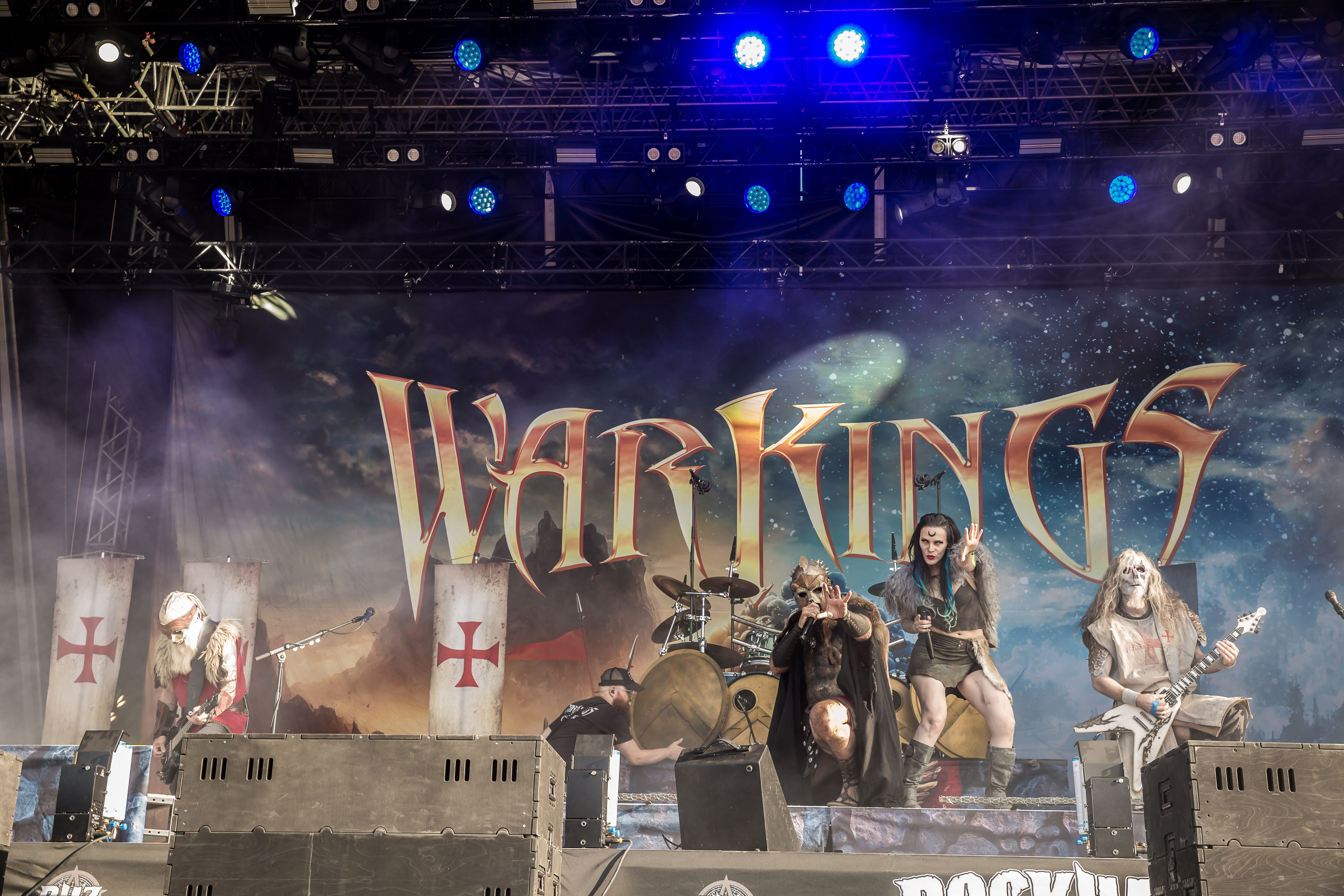
- The band performing in 2025

Background information
- Origin: Germany / Austria
- Genres: Power metal
- Years active: 2018–present
- Label: Napalm
- Members: Georg Neuhauser; Markus Pohl; Christian Rodens; Steffen Theurer; Secil Sen

Warkings is a German/Austrian power metal band formed in 2018.

== History ==
Warkings was formed by Serenity vocalist Georg Neuhauser and members of Souldrinker and Watch Me Bleed, all of whom use stage names such as "The Tribune" (Neuhauser), "The Crusader" (guitarist Markus Pohl), "The Viking" (bassist Christian Rodens), and "The Spartan" (drummer Steffen Theurer). Their debut album Reborn was released on 16 November 2018. The band followed it up with their second album Revenge in 2020. A single from the album, "Odin's Sons", was released on 29 July 2020, two days before the album's release on 31 July. The album has received several positive reviews.

Warkings released their third album Revolution in 2021. A single from the album, "We are the Fire", was released on 22 August 2021, two days after the album's release on 20 August. The album has received some mildly positive reviews. A music video for another song from the album, "Ragnar", was not released until two years later, on 29 December 2023.

Warkings released their fourth album Morgana in November 2022, with some songs featuring vocalist Secil Sen (Morgana le Fay) who would then become a full-time member. Singles were released for the songs "To the King" and "Heart of Rage". The album has received some mildly positive reviews. The band embarked on a European tour on March and April 2024. They have also released their own cover of "Armata Strigoi" by Powerwolf.

Their fifth album Armageddon was released on 4 July 2025. Singles were released for the title track, "Genghis Khan", "Kings Of Ragnarök", and "Hangman's Night". The album has received some mixed-to-positive reviews. On 18 December 2025, the band released a single, "Pirates & Kings", in collaboration with Visions of Atlantis.

== Band members ==
- Georg Neuhauser (The Tribune) – vocals (2018–present)
- Markus Pohl (The Crusader) – guitars (2018–present)
- Christian Rodens (The Viking) – bass (2018–present)
- Steffen Theurer (The Spartan) – drums (2018–present)
- Secil Sen (Morgana le Fay) – vocals (2022–present)

== Discography ==
Studio albums:

- Reborn (2018)
- Revenge (2020)
- Revolution (2021)
- Morgana (2022)
- Armageddon (2025)
