= Armageddon (Warkings album) =

Studio album by Warkings
- Released: July 4, 2025
- Studio: Hansen Studios; Two Eleven Studios; Alcatraz Studios
- Genre: Power metal
- Length: 44:04
- Label: Napalm
- Producer: Felix Heldt

Warkings chronology
Morgana (2022)	Armageddon (2025)

Singles from Armageddon
- 1. "Armageddon" Released: 10 April 2025

Armageddon is the fifth studio album by power metal band Warkings. It was released on 4 July 2025 via Napalm Records. The first single and title track was released on 10 April 2025.

== Reception ==
Professional ratings
Review scores
Source	Rating
Blabbermouth	8/10 stars
Ghost Cult Magazine	8/10 stars
Metal Hammer	5/10 stars

Metal.de remarked, "Anyone who likes anthemic power metal with a pinch of cheese can't go wrong with the undead band's new album."

Chris Chantler of Metal Hammer rated the album five out of ten and stated, "Somewhat diverse influences are attempted, but Armageddon feels less like an artistic exercise, more a cynical attempt to cover popular bases."

The album received a rating of eight out of ten from Blabbermouth, whose reviewer Dom Lawson described it as the band's "strongest album to date," and noted it as "a very fine way to confirm that their music is now as explosive and resonant as originally intended: a battle clearly won."

== Track listing ==
Armageddon track listing
No.	Title	Length
1.	"To Lindisfarne..."	1:20
2.	"Armageddon"	3:01
3.	"Genghis Khan" (featuring Orden Ogan)	3:27
4.	"Kingdom Come"	3:50
5.	"Morgana's Incantation"	0:31
6.	"Circle of Witches"	2:39
7.	"Kings of Ragnarök"	3:54
8.	"Call to Arms"	0:30
9.	"Troops of Immortality"	3:11
10.	"Nightfall"	3:17
11.	"Hangman's Night" (featuring Dominum)	3:48
12.	"Varangoi"	3:56
13.	"Here Comes the Rain"	3:44
14.	"Stahl auf Stahl" (featuring Subway to Sally)	3:36
Total length:		44:04

== Personnel ==
- The Tribune – vocals
- The Crusader – guitar
- The Viking – bass
- The Spartan – drums
- Morgana le Fay – growls, vocals
- Dominum – vocals (on "Hangman's Night")
- Orden Ogan – vocals (on "Genghis Khan")
- Subway to Sally – vocals, instrumentation (on "Stahl auf Stahl")
- Felix Heldt – producer, vocal recording
- Jacob Hansen – drum recording, mixing, mastering
- Simon Michael – drum recording
- Jeremy Lentner – bass recording
- Matthias Schwaighofer – photography
- Peter Sallai – artwork, layout

== Charts ==
Chart performance for Armageddon
Chart (2025)	Peak position
Austrian Albums (Ö3 Austria)	10
German Albums (Offizielle Top 100)	6
Swiss Albums (Schweizer Hitparade)	38
