= War of Ages (Serenity album) =

Studio album by Serenity
- Released: 22 March 2013
- Genre: Symphonic metal, power metal
- Length: 61:08
- Label: Napalm
- Producer: Oliver Philipps, Jan Vacik, Thomas Buchberger and Georg Neuhauser

Serenity chronology
Death & Legacy (2011)	War of Ages (2013)	Codex Atlanticus (2016)

Singles from War of Ages
- 1. "Wings of Madness" Released: March 2013

War of Ages is the fourth full-length studio album by Austrian symphonic metal band Serenity. The album was released on March 22, 2013 in Europe and sometime in March or April in North America and Asia, via Napalm Records.

War of Ages continues to show Serenity perfecting their symphonic metal music and still keeping true to their power metal root. It also marks the first album with an additional singer, female vocalist Clémentine Delauney, formerly of Whyzdom, and as it turns out a few years later, her last. This will also mark the final album of longtime guitarist Thomas Buchberger as an official member of Serenity. Both departures were announced via their Official website on February 3, 2015.

The album itself focuses on historical figures and events, just as its predecessor Death & Legacy had done, keeping true to Serenity's historical concept. Characters stories, such as Beethoven, Napoleon, and others have their tales told through Serenity's words and melodic tone.

== History ==
War of Ages is the first Serenity album with an additional singer. Clémentine Delauney, who joined the band officially on January 21, 2013. makes here Serenity debut with soaring vocals, adding a very melodic counterpart to longtime Serenity front man Georg Neuhauser. The band says: "While staying true to all Serenity trademarks such as symphonic orchestras, heavy rhythms, amazing melodic vocals and bombastic choirs, we also brought in some new elements in form of various new sounds in the Serenity universe and a constant implementation of female vocals supporting outstanding singer Georg Neuhauser."

Announcement for official release of the album came via the band's website, stating, "While staying true to all Serenity trademarks such as symphonic orchestras, heavy rhythms, amazing melodic vocals & bombastic choirs we also brought in some new elements in form of various new sounds in the Serenity universe and a constant implementation of female vocals supporting outstanding singer Georg Neuhauser.

The artwork cover for War of Ages was created by Spiros Antoniou, who previously worked with Serenity on their debut album Words Untold & Dreams Unlived. The release was mixed and mastered by Jan Vacik at Dreamsound Studios in München, Germany, with orchestrations and music arrangements done by Oliver Philipps. Both are veterans of previous Serenity albums.

=== Concept ===
War of Ages can be considered a concept album of sorts as its tracks are based on historical figures and events in history, coinciding with Serenity's previous album Death & Legacy.

- 'Wings of Madness' - Elizabeth Báthory, "The Blood Countess" and her atrocities.
- 'The Art of War' - Napoleon Bonaparte and his mastery of warfare.
- 'Shining Oasis' - The ancient and lost city of Petra.
- 'For Freedom's Sake' - The suffering of the 30 Years War through the eyes of a man and woman.
- 'Age of Glory' - Alexander the Great and his need for conquest while watching his life fade away.
- 'The Matricide' - Nero and the murder of his mother that he supposedly ordered.
- 'Symphony For The Quiet' - Ludwig van Beethoven and the sorrow he felt when he lost his hearing.
- 'Tannenberg' - Ulrich von Jungingen and Battle of Tannenberg that erupted in Poland.
- 'Legacy of Tudors' - Henry VIII and his reign under the crown.
- 'Royal Pain' - House of Habsburg and its reign and demise in the Austrian territory.

=== Music Video and Singles ===
A music video was shot for the lead off single "Wings of Madness" and released on March 28, 2013. The music video shows Clementine in the role of Elizabeth Bathory, and shows her torment of others, alleged throughout history. "Wings of Madness" is War of Ages only single up to this point.

== Reception ==
The album came out to outstanding reviews both across Europe and North America. From Metal Underground, the review states "Many bands attempt to play symphonic metal, but Austria's Serenity has mastered the art to such a degree that the mere mention of a new release spellbinds fans of the subgenre," and "Serenity takes the symphonic metal world by storm with its 'War of Ages.'"

Angry Metal Guy states, "To Serenity's credit, there isn't a weak track in the bunch. Although everything sounds like it was lifted from better known contemporaries, it's all high quality, memorable and very easy to like," and "This is by far Serenity's best release and a very enjoyable dose of symphonic power."

Professional ratings
Review scores
Source	Rating
Angry Metal Guy	4/5 stars
About.com	3.5/5 stars
Sputnik Music	3.4 stars on a 5 point scale
Metalstorm.net	7.8 stars on a 10 point scale
The Metal Crypt	4.38 stars on a 5 point scale

== Track listing ==
No.	Title	Length
1.	"Wings of Madness"	6:01
2.	"The Art of War"	5:15
3.	"Shining Oasis"	5:15
4.	"For Freedom's Sake"	4:42
5.	"Age of Glory"	6:50
6.	"The Matricide"	5:03
7.	"Symphony for the Quiet"	5:06
8.	"Tannenberg"	5:59
9.	"Legacy of Tudors"	5:09
10.	"Royal Pain"	4:51

Limited & Japanese Editions
No.	Title	Length
11.	"Fairytales (piano version)"	4:29
12.	"Love of My Life (Queen Cover)"	3:50

== Personnel ==
=== The Band ===
- Georg Neuhauser – lead and backing vocals
- Clémentine Delauney – female and backing vocals
- Thomas Buchberger – lead and rhythm guitars, backing vocals
- Fabio D'Amore – bass guitar and backing vocals
- Andreas Schipflinger – drums

=== Guest Musicians ===
- Franz-Josef Hauser – piano (on Limited Edition Bonus Track #11 and #12)
- Oliver Philipps – keyboards & pianos; effect guitar on #08; backing vocals; orchestration

== Production ==
- Produced by Oliver Philipps, Jan Vacik, and Serenity.
- All songs written by Thomas Buchberger, Mario Hirzinger, Georg Neuhauser, and Clémentine Delauney except "Love of My Life".
- "Love of My Life" lyrics (Limited Edition only) written by Freddie Mercury of Queen
- Choir arrangements and recordings by Oliver Philipps
- Orchestration, keyboards and pianos arrangements & by Oliver Philipps
- All rhythm, lead, acoustic & classical guitars performed by Thomas Buchberger (except effect guitar on "Tannenberg" by Oliver Philipps)
- Guitar & bass recordings, drum editing, additional piano recordings, additional editing & preproduction by Thomas Buchberger
- Bass guitar recordings by Fabio D'Amore & Ivan Moni Bidin, assisted by Simone Zoldan
