= Lionheart (Serenity album) =

Studio album by Serenity
- Released: 27 October 2017
- Genres: Symphonic metal Power metal Progressive metal
- Length: 54:38
- Label: Napalm

Serenity chronology
Codex Atlanticus (2016)	Lionheart (2017)	The Last Knight (2020)

Professional ratings
Review scores
Source	Rating
Dead Rhetoric	8.5/10
Distorted Sound	9/10
Ghost Cult Magazine	7.5/10
Metal Temple	8/10
Stormbringer	4.5/5

Lionheart is the sixth studio album by the Austrian symphonic power metal band Serenity. Continuing the band's lyrical theme of historical events, this is a concept album based on Richard the Lionheart and his legacy. The title track premiered as a pre-release single on 22 September 2017.

== Track listing ==
No.	Title	Length
1.	"Deus Lo Vult"	1:52
2.	"United"	5:33
3.	"Lionheart"	4:38
4.	"Hero"	4:24
5.	"Rising High"	3:33
6.	"Heaven"	4:09
7.	"King's Landing"	2:10
8.	"Eternal Victory"	4:41
9.	"Stand and Fight"	4:23
10.	"The Fortress (Of Blood and Sand)"	4:26
11.	"Empire"	4:27
12.	"My Fantasy"	4:45
13.	"The Final Crusade"	4:37
Total length:		54:38

== Personnel ==
Band members

- Georg Neuhauser - lead vocals
- Chris Hermsdörfer - guitars, backing vocals
- Fabio D'Amore - bass, backing vocals
- Andreas Schipflinger - drums, backing vocals

Guest/session musicians

- Franz-Josef Hauser - choir vocals
- Katja Moslehner - female vocals (tracks 6)
- Jan Vacik - choir vocals (track 12)
- Bob Katsionis - additional guitar (track 12)
- Federica Lanna (Volturian) - female vocals (track 13)
