= The Last Knight (album) =

Studio album by Serenity
- Released: 31 January 2020
- Genres: Symphonic metal Power metal Progressive metal
- Length: 51:46
- Label: Napalm

Serenity chronology
Lionheart (2017)	The Last Knight (2020)	Nemesis AD (2023)

Professional ratings
Review scores
Source	Rating
GBHBL	9.5/10
Ghost Cult Magazine	8/10
Metal.de	7/10
Stormbringer	4/5

The Last Knight is the seventh studio album by the Austrian symphonic power metal band Serenity. Continuing the band's lyrical theme of historical events, this is a concept album based on Holy Roman Emperor Maximilian I and his legacy. The album has received several positive reviews.

== Track listing ==
No.	Title	Length
1.	"The Last Knight"	2:02
2.	"Invictus"	4:18
3.	"Set the World on Fire"	4:24
4.	"Keeper of the Knights"	4:42
5.	"Souls and Sins"	4:39
6.	"My Kingdom Comes"	4:33
7.	"Queen of Avalon"	4:31
8.	"My Farewell"	4:54
9.	"Down to Hell"	4:40
10.	"Wings of Pride"	4:04
11.	"Call to Arms"	4:22
12.	"Souls and Sins (acoustic version, bonus track)"	4:37
Total length:		51:46

== Personnel ==
Band members

- Georg Neuhauser - lead vocals
- Chris Hermsdörfer - guitars, backing vocals
- Fabio D'Amore - bass, backing vocals
- Andreas Schipflinger - drums, backing vocals

Guest/session musicians

- Luki Knoebl - orchestrations
- Marco Pastorino - choir vocals
- Sascha Paeth - additional guitar (track 2)
- Herbie Langhans (Firewind) - choir/lead vocals (track 3)
- Oliver Hartmann - lead vocals (track 12)
