= Revenge (Warkings album) =

Studio album by Warkings
- Released: July 31, 2020
- Studio: Chameleon Recording Studios
- Genre: Power metal
- Length: 44:07
- Label: Napalm
- Producer: Eike Freese

Warkings chronology
| Reborn (2018) | Revenge (2020) | Revolution (2021) |

Singles from Reborn
- 1. "Odin's Sons" Released: 29 July 2020

Professional ratings
Review scores
| Source | Rating |
|---|---|
| Blabbermouth.net | 6.5/10 |
| Distorted Sound | 8/10 |
| Metal.de | 8/10 |

Revenge is the second studio album by power metal band Warkings. It was released on 31 July 2020 via Napalm Records.

== Track listing ==
Revenge track listing
| No. | Title | Length |
|---|---|---|
| 1. | "Freedom" | 4:20 |
| 2. | "Maximus" | 4:12 |
| 3. | "Warriors" | 3:53 |
| 4. | "Fight in the Shade" | 3:59 |
| 5. | "Odin's Sons" (featuring Melissa Bonny) | 4:29 |
| 6. | "Banner's High" | 4:17 |
| 7. | "Mirror, Mirror" | 3:45 |
| 8. | "Azrael" | 4:11 |
| 9. | "Battle of Marathon" | 3:14 |
| 10. | "Warking" | 4:16 |
| 11. | "Sparta" (bonus track from Reborn, featuring Melissa Bonny) | 3:27 |
| Total length: | | 44:03 |

== Personnel ==
- The Tribune – vocals
- The Crusader – guitar
- The Viking – bass
- The Spartan – drums
- Melissa Bonny – vocals (on tracks 5 and 11)
- Princeps Lucas Sonus Knöbl – keyboards
- Denny Meissner – choir vocals
- Danielson the Kutz – choir vocals
- Comitissa Claudia Ciresa – choir vocals
- Eike Freese – choir vocals, producer, mixing, mastering
- Fabius Damores – choir vocals, recording
- Sir Jan of Vacik – recording
- Gyula Havancsák – artwork, layout
