= Codex Atlanticus (album) =

Studio album by Serenity
- Released: January 20, 2016 (Avalon, Japan); January 29, 2016 (Napalm Records)
- Genres: Symphonic metal Power metal Progressive metal
- Length: 50:54
- Labels: Napalm; Avalon, Japan

Serenity chronology
War of Ages (2013)	Codex Atlanticus (2016)	Lionheart (2017)

Codex Atlanticus is the fifth studio album by the Austrian symphonic power metal band Serenity.

All lyrics created based on historical events inspired by Leonardo da Vinci and his legacy except on one of the bonus tracks "Sail".

== Track listing ==
No.	Title	Length
1.	"Codex Atlanticus"	1:56
2.	"Follow Me"	3:52
3.	"Sprouts of Terror"	5:14
4.	"Iniquity"	5:33
5.	"Reason"	4:13
6.	"My Final Chapter"	4:11
7.	"Caught in a Myth"	5:33
8.	"Fate of Light"	4:43
9.	"The Perfect Woman"	4:54
10.	"Spirit in the Flesh"	5:00
11.	"The Order"	5:23
Total length:		50:54

Bonus tracks
No.	Title	Length
12.	"Forgive Me"	5:32
13.	"Sail"	4:13
14.	"My Final Chapter (Orchestral version)"	4:13
Total length:		1:04:52

Japanese bonus track
No.	Title	Length
15.	"My Final Chapter (Instrumental)"	4:11
Total length:		1:09:03

== Personnel ==
Band members

- Andreas Schipflinger - drums, backing vocals
- Georg Neuhauser - lead and backing vocals
- Fabio D'Amore - 5 & 4-string basses, lead and backing vocals
- Chris Hermsdörfer - electric, acoustic & classical guitars, backing vocals

Guest/session musicians

- Amanda Somerville - female vocals (tracks 1, 9)
- Simon Huber - cello (track 1)
- Natascha Koch - female vocals (track 13), backing vocals (tracks 4, 7)
- Lukas Knoebl - orchestrations and programming, composer (track 1)

== Charts ==
Chart (2016)	Peak position
Austrian Albums (Ö3 Austria)	61
Japanese Albums (Oricon)	177
