= Morgana (Warkings album) =

Studio album by Warkings
- Released: November 11, 2022
- Genre: Power metal
- Length: 54:05
- Label: Napalm
- Producer: Eike Freese

Warkings chronology
Revolution (2021)	Morgana (2022)	Armageddon (2025)

Singles from Morgana
- 1. "To the King" Released: 28 September 2022; 2. "Heart of Rage" Released: 17 February 2023

Professional ratings
Review scores
Source	Rating
Distorted Sound	7/10
Metal.de	7/10

Morgana is the fourth studio album by power metal band Warkings. It was released on 11 November 2022 via Napalm Records, with some songs featuring vocalist Secil Sen (Morgana Le Fay) who would then become a full-time member. The band embarked on a European tour in support of the album on March and April 2024. One of the bonus tracks is their own cover of "Armata Strigoi" by Powerwolf.

== Track listing ==
Morgana track listing
No.	Title	Length
1.	"Hellfire" (featuring Morgana Le Fay)	4:47
2.	"To the King"	4:38
3.	"Monsters" (featuring Morgana Le Fay)	4:27
4.	"Last of the English"	5:09
5.	"Heart of Rage" (featuring Morgana Le Fay)	4:15
6.	"Row (Into the Storm)"	4:39
7.	"Immortal" (featuring Morgana Le Fay)	3:54
8.	"Shame"	5:11
9.	"The Rite"	4:48
10.	"Legend Untold"	3:36
11.	"Armata Strigoi" (Powerwolf cover) (bonus track)	4:14
12.	"Cry Thunder" (DragonForce cover) (featuring Morgana Le Fay) (bonus track)	4:27
Total length:		54:05

== Personnel ==
- The Tribune – vocals
- The Crusader – guitar
- The Viking – bass
- The Spartan – drums
- Morgana le Fay – vocals (on tracks 1, 3, 5, 7, and 12)
- Princeps Lucas Sonus Knöbl – keyboards
- Centurio Marco Pastorino – choir vocals
- Eike Freese – choir vocals, producer, mixing, mastering
- Matthias Schwaighofer – choir vocals, photography, vocal recording
- St. Thomas T. – vocal recording
- Gyula Havancsák – artwork, layout
