= Fallen Sanctuary =

Studio album by Serenity
- Released: (Europe) 29 August 2008
- Recorded: December 2007 – April 2008
- Genre: Symphonic power metal Progressive metal
- Length: 49:41
- Label: Napalm Records
- Producer: Jan Vacik and Oliver Philipps

Serenity chronology
| Words Untold & Dreams Unlived (2007) | Fallen Sanctuary (2008) | Death & Legacy (2011) |

Singles from Fallen Sanctuary
- 1. "Velatum" Released: August 2008

Fallen Sanctuary is the second full-length studio album by symphonic metal band Serenity released on August 27, 2008 in Finland; August 29, 2008 in Serenity's home country Austria and Germany. The album was released in the rest of Europe on September 1 and in the US and Canada on September 9. The only single from Fallen Sanctuary is "Velatum."

The album marks the turning point of the band towards a more symphonic sound. Many aspects of their first album, Words Untold & Dreams Unlived, such as the power riffs and heavy metal influences, remain, but the band adds melodic elements and orchestrations, producing a more melodic, rich sound that are now known for in their music. The band would continue and perfect this addition in all their later albums.

All photos for the album were shot by Caroline Traitler. Artwork and logos for Fallen Sanctuary created by Gustavo Sazes.

== History ==
Fallen Sanctuary was released August 27–29, 2008 through Napalm Records in Europe and September 9, 2008 in the US and Canada.

Originally, the album had a tentative title of Fallen, but later, reflection of a similar album title, Evanescence's album of the same name, gave the band a new direction for the album's name. Fallen Sanctuary was chosen, describing "the point or a statement the band was looking for."

Track 11, "Journey's End", on the Limited Edition album, also appeared in its original state on the band's demo Engraved Within.

=== Music Video and Single ===
The album produced the band's first single "Velatum." The word is appropriate for the single as it is the past participle of "velare," meaning to cover, wrap, hide, or conceal. The song itself refers to a hidden or concealed mystery of past lives.

The LTD/Digipack version of Fallen Sanctuary also contains the band's first video clip "Velatum," which was shot by director Robert Geir and "Wildruf" camera crew from July 2 to 5, 2008. The video for "Velatum" was released online on July 17. Costumes for the music video were done by Eva Praxmarer and the make up by Elisabeth Malojer. The video also highlights a string orchestra with composes of violins and basses. Katharina Neuschmid, Isabella Bizai, Karina Nobe, Priska Gasser, Hannah Koll, and Johanna Niederbacher make up the "Velatum Orchestra."

The video starts out with various shots of lead vocalist Georg Neuhauser sitting in a throne like chair mixed with landscapes such as mountain sides and lakes. When Georg drops the goblet he is holding, the song takes off. Glimpses of a mysterious female, played by Caroline Unterrainer, are mixed with shots of the band and orchestra as they play. Georg continues singing as the mysterious female walks through the lake. She slowly makes her way over to Georg and touches his face. Georg is suddenly in a forest, looking for this mysterious woman. He finds her as the song comes to and end, where they embrace. She suddenly vanishes into the lake as the video ends.

== Reception ==
Fallen Sanctuary was met with strong reviews instantly in the metal and symphonic metal world. A review from Sea of Tranquility states "Serenity is one of the best bands to arrive on the metal scene in quite some time. This album is a thing of beauty. The orchestral arrangements and huge choirs really add that progressive element to the music that puts this album in the upper echelon of metal releases...."

The heavy metal website Metal Crypt states, "The production is absolutely first-class, and the vocal mix puts Neuhauser front and center — the kind of recording job where you swear you can hear the guy's nose hairs — it's a demanding position for a singer, as it leaves no room for error, but he rises to the challenge with an amazing performance."

All Music gives the album five stars out of five and About.com states, "Serenity has really stepped up on Fallen Sanctuary. The well-written songs, interesting arrangements and catchy hooks will really appeal to power and progressive metal fans," while giving the band four stars out of five.

Lords of Metal gives the album a 92% and Ultimate Guitar gives 'Fallen Sanctuary' 9.6 out of 10.

Professional ratings
Review scores
| Source | Rating |
|---|---|
| Lords of Metal | (92/100) |
| Metal.de | 6/10 stars |
| Fury Rocks | 7/10 stars |
| About.com | 4/5 stars |
| Ultimate Guitar | 9.6 stars on a 10 point scale |
| All Music | 5/5 stars |
| The Metal Crypt | 4.9 stars on a 5 point scale |
| Sea of Tranquility | 4.5/5 stars |
| Metal Storm | 8.5/10 stars |
| Metal Crypt | 4.9 stars on a 5 point scale |

== Track listing ==
| No. | Title | Length |
|---|---|---|
| 1. | "All Lights Reversed" | 6:18 |
| 2. | "Rust of Coming Ages" | 4:30 |
| 3. | "Coldness Kills" | 5:28 |
| 4. | "To Stone She Turned" | 4:59 |
| 5. | "Fairytales" | 4:54 |
| 6. | "The Heartblood Symphony" | 5:27 |
| 7. | "Velatum" | 4:29 |
| 8. | "Derelict" | 4:26 |
| 9. | "Sheltered (By the Obscure)" | 5:00 |
| 10. | "Oceans of Ruby" | 4:16 |

Limited Edition Bonus Track(s)
| No. | Title | Length |
|---|---|---|
| 11. | "Journey's End" | 5:01 |

== Personnel ==
=== The Band ===
- Georg Neuhauser – Lead and Backing Vocals
- Thomas Buchberger – Lead and Rhythm Guitars
- Simon Holzknecht – Bass Guitar
- Mario Hirzinger – Keyboard
- Andreas Schipflinger – Drums and Backing Vocals

=== Guest Musicians ===
- Oliver Philipps - Additional Keyboards
- Sandra Schleret - Female Vocals (on track #5)
- Maggo Wenze (Tristwood/Inzest) - Death Vocals (on tracks #2 and #10)

== Production ==
- All songs written by Buchberger, Hirzinger and Neuhauser
- Arranged by Serenity, Jan Vacik and Oliver Philipps
- Orchestral arrangements by Oliver Philipps
- Choir arrangements and vocal recordings by Lanvall
- Guest vocal recordings by Thomas Buchberger
- Drum and bass recordings and additional pianos by Jan Vacik
- Additional hours of clipping and editing by Jan Vacik
- Mix and mastering by Jacob Hansen at Hansen Studios
