= Revolution (Warkings album) =

Studio album by Warkings
- Released: August 20, 2021
- Studio: Chameleon Recording Studios
- Genre: Power metal
- Length: 40:52
- Label: Napalm
- Producer: Eike Freese

Warkings chronology
Revenge (2020)	Revolution (2021)	Morgana (2022)

Singles from Revolution
- 1. "We are the Fire" Released: 22 August 2021; 2. "Ragnar" Released: 29 December 2023

Professional ratings
Review scores
Source	Rating
Blabbermouth.net	6/10
Metal.de	7/10

Revolution is the third studio album by power metal band Warkings. It was released on 20 August 2021 via Napalm Records. The song "Spartacus" features Chris Harms of Lord of the Lost.

== Track listing ==
Revolution track listing
No.	Title	Length
1.	"We Are the Fire"	3:38
2.	"Sparta, Pt. II" (featuring Ioannis Maniatopoulos)	3:53
3.	"Fight"	3:59
4.	"Spartacus" (featuring Chris Harms)	3:37
5.	"Kill for the King"	3:17
6.	"Deus Lo Vult"	4:39
7.	"Ave Roma"	4:11
8.	"Ragnar" (featuring Medina Rekic)	5:01
9.	"By the Blade"	3:52
10.	"Where Dreams Die"	4:45
Total length:		40:52

== Personnel ==
- The Tribune – vocals
- The Crusader – guitar
- The Viking – bass
- The Spartan – drums
- Ioannis Maniatopoulos – bouzouki (on track 2)
- Chris Harms – vocals (on track 4)
- Medina Rekic – vocals (on track 8)
- Princeps Lucas Sonus Knöbl – keyboards
- Denny Meissner – choir vocals
- Tim Damman – choir vocals
- Matthias Schwaighofer – choir vocals
- Eike Freese – choir vocals, producer, recording, mixing, mastering
- St. Thomas T. – vocal recording
- Gyula Havancsák – artwork, layout
