= Reborn (Warkings album) =

Studio album by Warkings
- Released: November 16, 2018
- Studio: Chameleon Recording Studios
- Genre: Power metal
- Length: 41:41
- Label: Napalm
- Producer: Eike Freese

Warkings chronology
Reborn (2018)	Revenge (2020)

Professional ratings
Review scores
Source	Rating
Knac.com	3.9/5
Metal Express Radio	8/10
Metal-Roos	9/10
Metal.de	6/10

Reborn is the debut studio album by power metal band Warkings. It was released on 16 November 2018 via Napalm Records.

== Track listing ==
Reborn track listing
No.	Title	Length
1.	"Give 'Em War"	4:48
2.	"Never Surrender"	3:30
3.	"Hephaistos"	4:06
4.	"Gladiator"	4:17
5.	"Holy Storm"	4:29
6.	"Battle Cry"	4:24
7.	"Fire Falling Down"	3:37
8.	"Sparta" (featuring Melissa Bonny and Mr. Debauchery)	3:27
9.	"The Last Battle"	4:36
10.	"Die Flut"	4:27
Total length:		41:41

== Personnel ==
- The Tribune – vocals
- The Crusader – guitar
- The Viking – bass
- The Spartan – drums
- Mr. Debauchery – vocals (on track 8)
- Melissa Bonny – vocals (on track 8)
- Sir Jan of Vacik – keyboards, backing vocals
- Fabius Damores – choir vocals
- Danielson the Kutz – choir vocals
- Eike Freese – producer, recording, mixing, mastering
- St. Thomas T. – vocal recording
- Gyula Havancsák – artwork, layout
