= Dominum (band) =

German power metal band

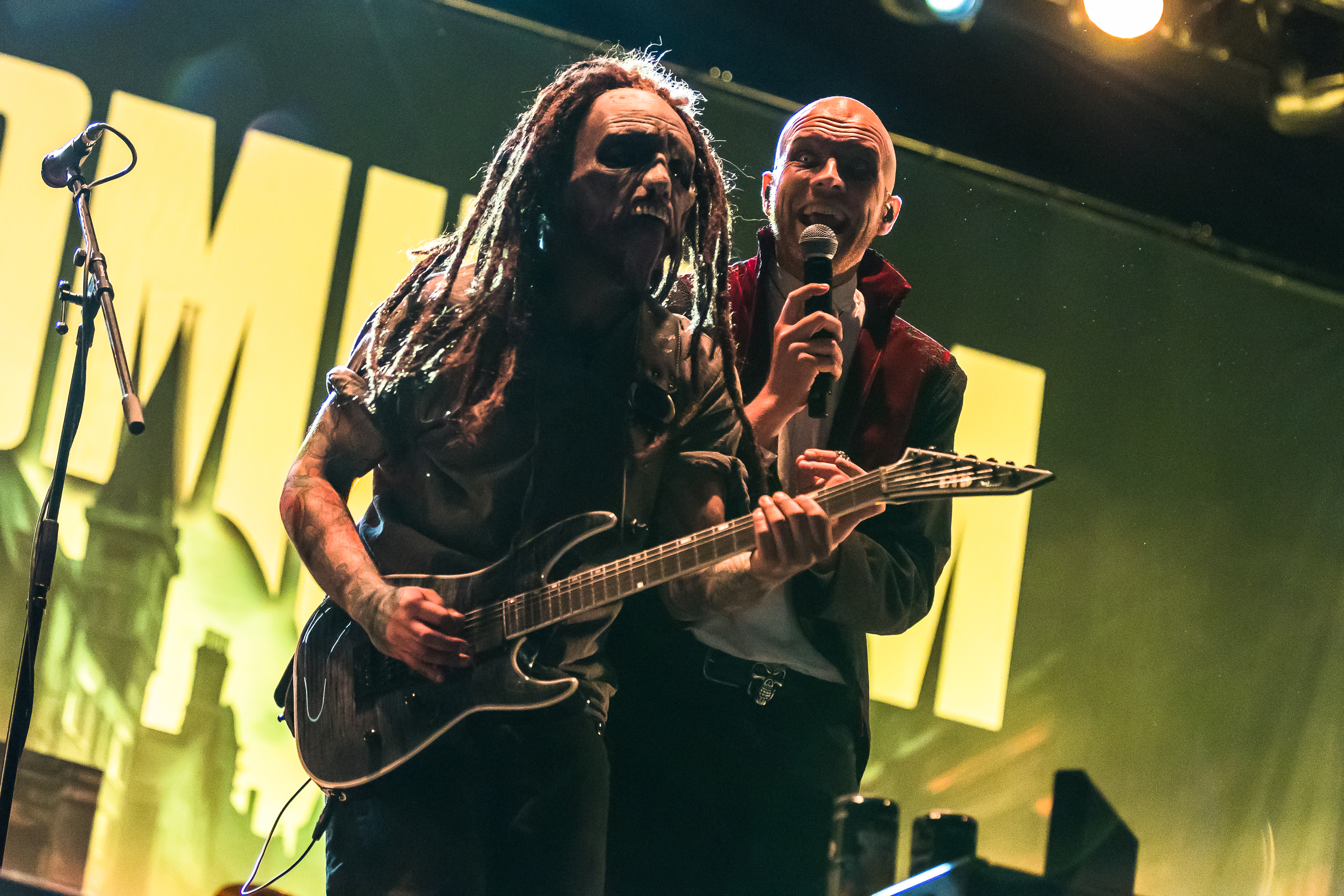
- Dominum at Rockharz Open Air 2024

Background information
- Origin: Nuremberg, Germany
- Genre: Power metal
- Years active: 2022–present
- Label: Napalm Records
- Members: Dr. Dead; Tommy Kemp; Patient Zero; Victor Hiltop

Dominum (stylized in all caps) is a German power metal band from Nuremberg, formed in 2022.

== History ==
Dominum was founded in 2022 by singer Dr. Dead (Felix Heldt). Heldt decided to form a zombie-themed band because he is a big fan of the comic and television series The Walking Dead and games like The Last of Us. The band therefore only performs in masks. The concept involves Dr. Dead, a mad scientist, controlling a horde of zombies who want to make the world a better place.

Through the recruitment of his bandmates, the musical direction was strongly steered toward power metal. Musically, Dr. Dead attempts to combine the bands Ghost and Sabaton.

Dominum's debut album, Hey Living People, was released on 29 December 2023, via Napalm Records. The album contains three cover versions: "You Spin Me Round (Like a Record)" by Dead or Alive, "Bad Guy" by Billie Eilish, and "Beds Are Burning" by Midnight Oil. The album reached number 18 in the German album charts. This was followed by tours as support acts for Die Apokalyptischen Reiter, Bruce Dickinson, and Avantasia, as well as several festival appearances.

One year after the debut album, the second album, The Dead Don't Die, was released again via Napalm Records. Ben Metzner of Feuerschwanz and dArtagnan appears as a guest on the title track. "Rock You Like a Hurricane" by Scorpions is another cover version on the album. The second album reached number 9 in the German charts.

Two years after second album, Dominum announced that their third album Night Is Calling, would be released via Napalm Records on 3 July 2026. The first single, "The Circus Is In Town", was released on 31 March 2026. Upon its release, the album entered the German and Austrian charts.

== Band members ==
Dominum, live at Rockharz 2026

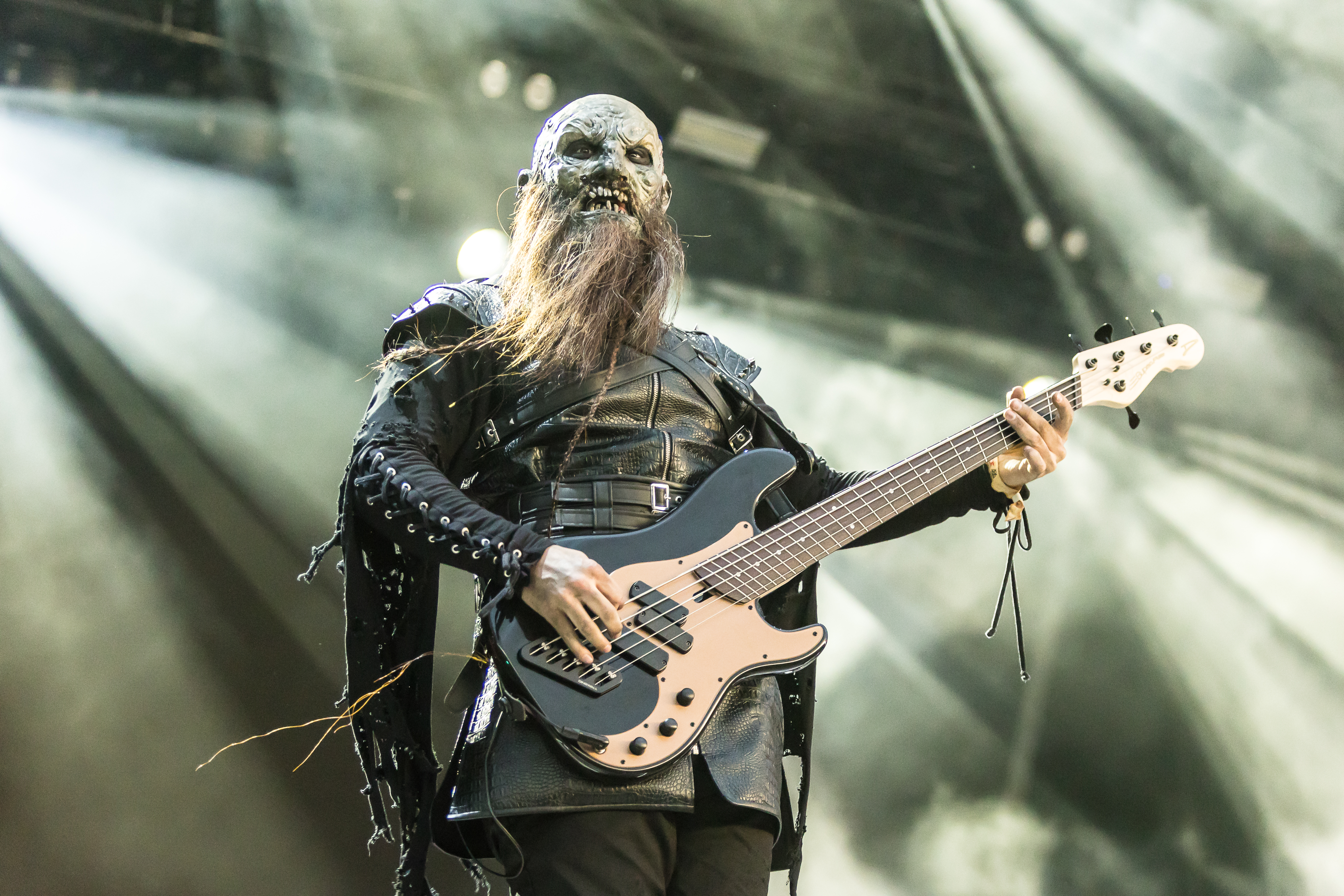
Patient Zero (Korbinian Benedict), bass

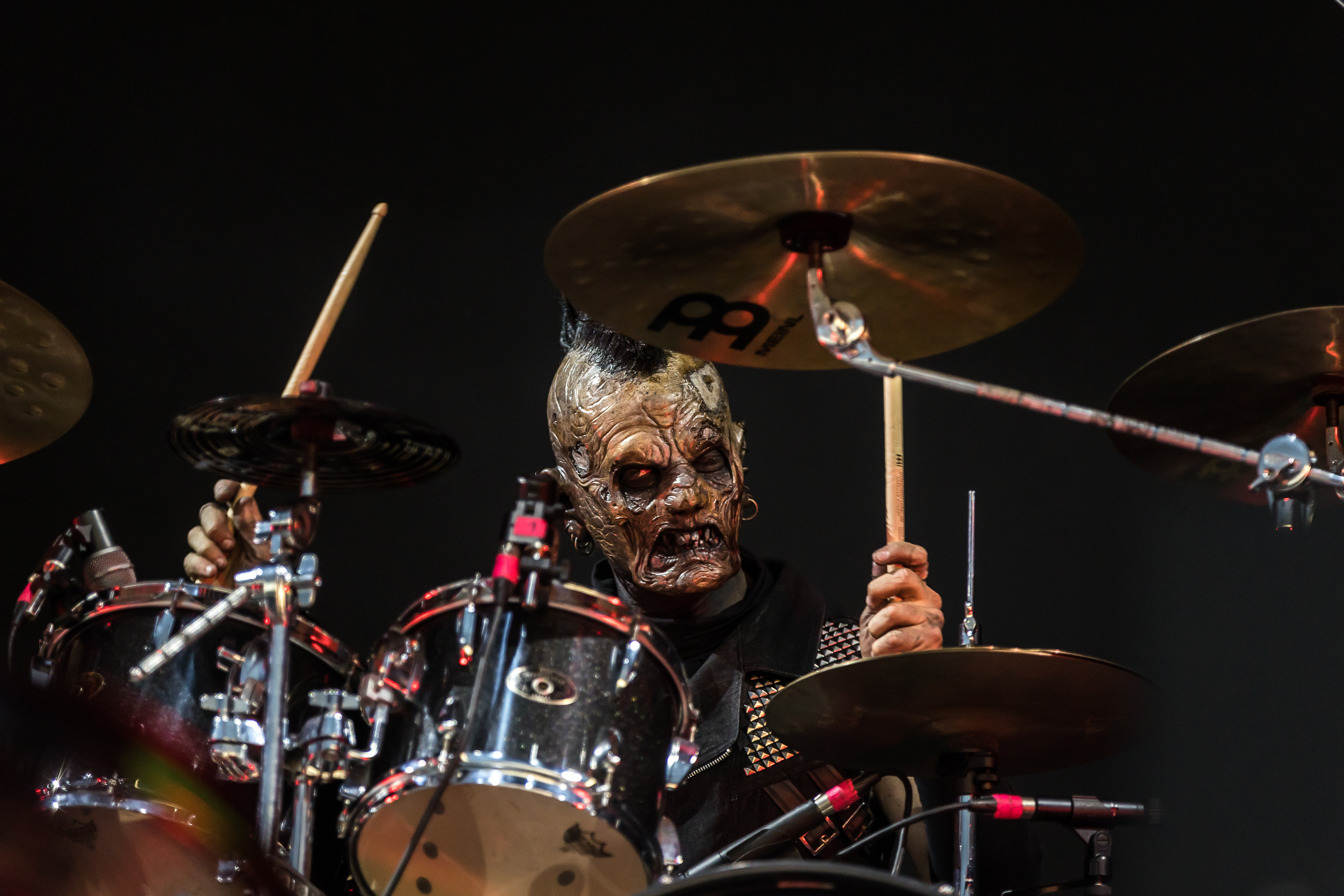
Victor Hiltop (Marcos Feminella), drums

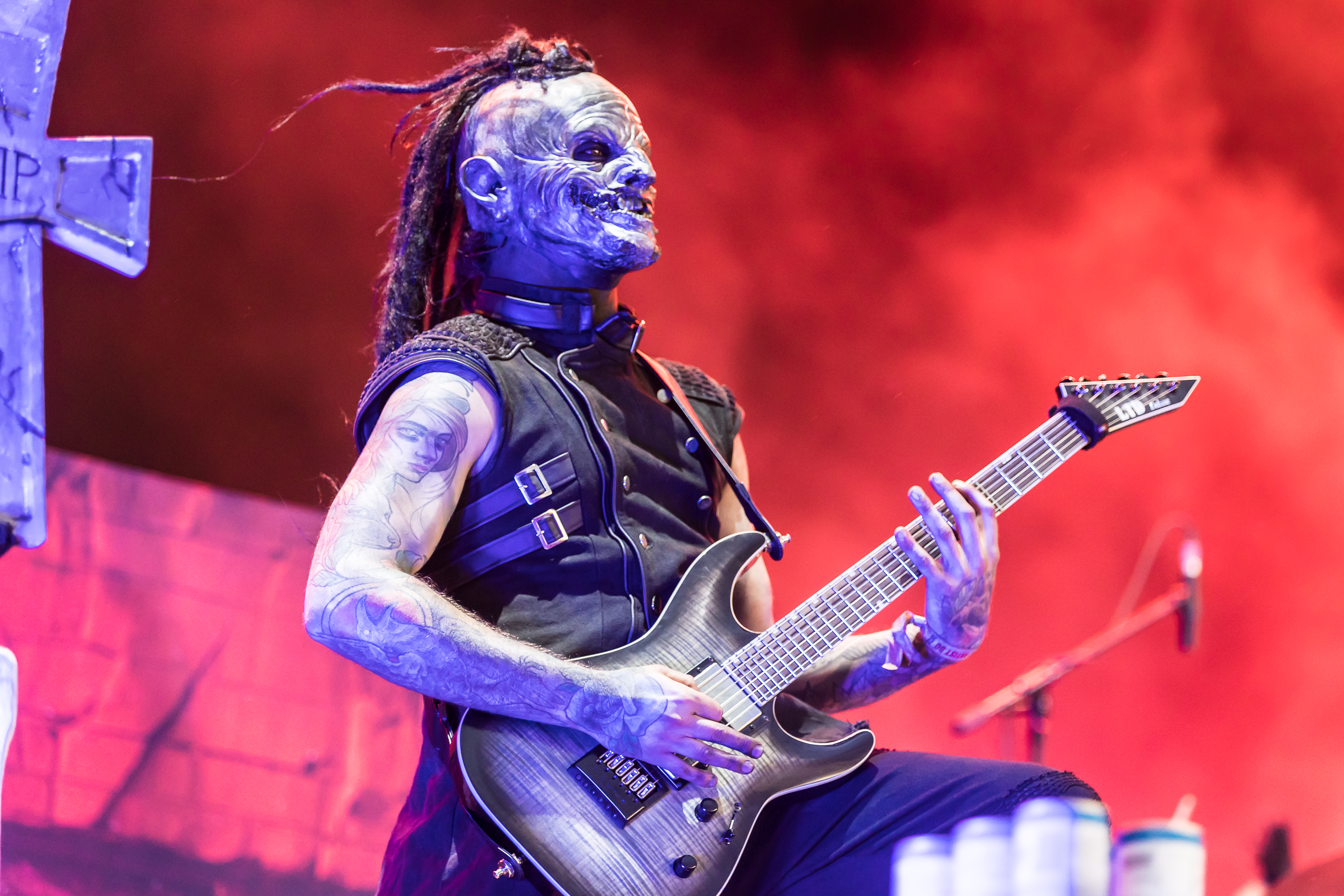
Tommy Kemp (Jochen Windisch), guitars

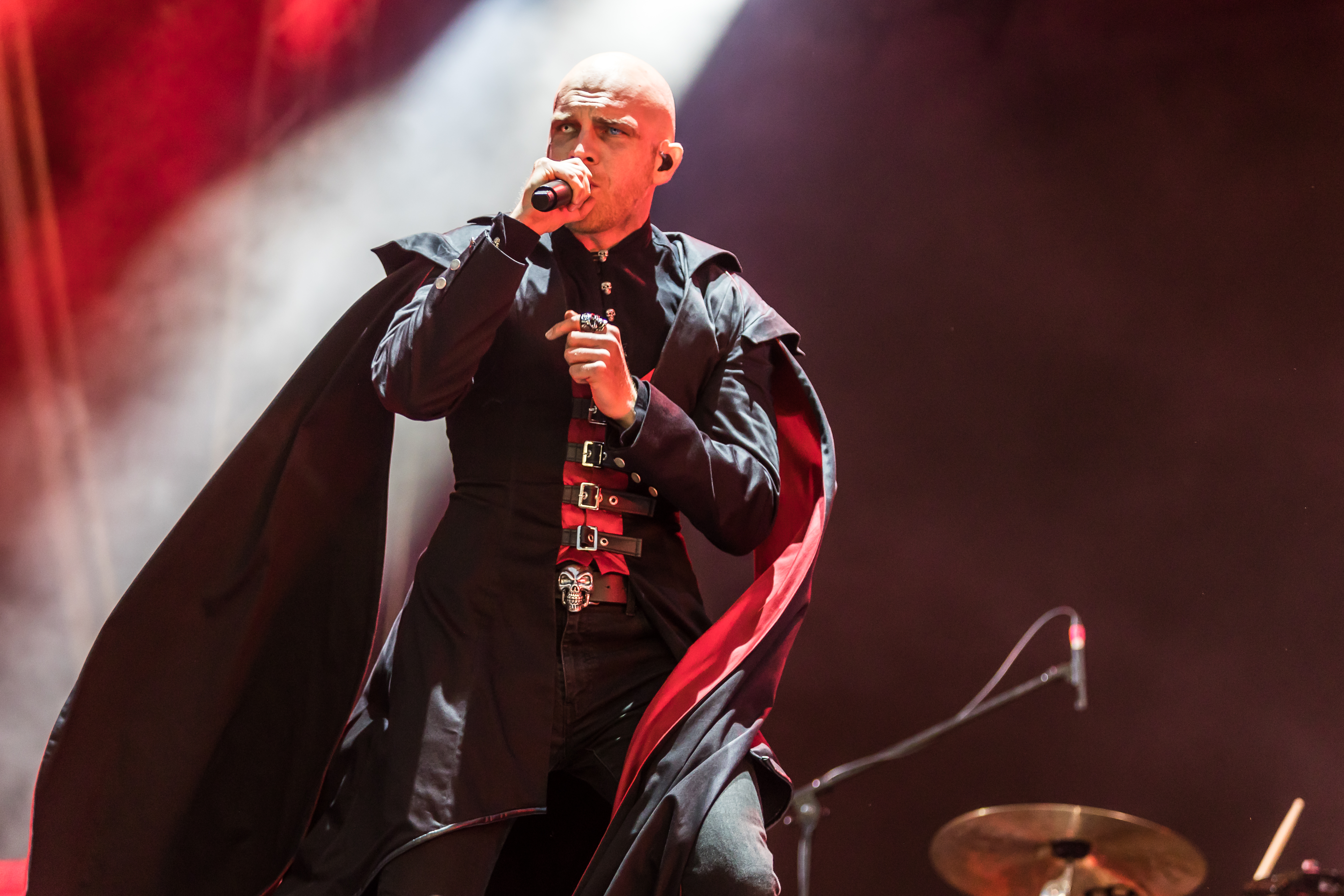
Dr. Dead (Felix Heldt), vocals

== Discography ==
=== Studio albums ===
List of studio albums, with selected details
Title	Album details	Peak chart positions	
Title	Album details	GER	AUT
Hey Living People	Released: 29 December 2023; Label: Napalm Records; Formats: CD, digital download, streaming	18	—
The Dead Don't Die	Released: 27 December 2024; Label: Napalm Records; Formats: CD, digital download, streaming	9	22
Night is Calling	Released: 03 July 2026; Label: Napalm Records; Formats: CD, digital download, streaming	8	32

=== EPs ===
- 2023: Cannibal Corpses
- 2023: Hey Living People

=== Singles ===
- 2023: Patient Zero
- 2023: Immortalis Dominum
- 2023: Danger Danger
- 2024: Rock You Like a Hurricane
- 2024: The Dead Don’t Die (feat. Feuerschwanz)
- 2024: One of Us
- 2024: We Are Forlorn
- 2024: Don't Get Bitten By The Wrong Ones
- 2026: The Circus Is in Town
- 2026: Doctor Doctor
- 2026: Dark Melodies
- 2026: Night Is Calling (feat. Battle Beast)
