= Death & Legacy =

Studio album by Serenity
- Released: (Europe) 25 February 2011
- Genres: Symphonic metal Power metal
- Length: 67:16
- Label: Napalm
- Producers: Oliver Philipps, Jan Vacik, Thomas Buchberger and Georg Neuhauser

Serenity chronology
Fallen Sanctuary (2008)	Death & Legacy (2011)	War of Ages (2013)

Singles from War of Ages
- 1. "The Chevalier" Released: January 2011; 2. "Serenade of Flames" Released: March 2011; 3. "When Canvas Starts To Burn" Released: November 2011

Death & Legacy is the third full-length studio album by symphonic metal band Serenity released on February 25, 2011 through Napalm Records. Death & Legacy is a concept album based on people and events of the past that had a historical impact, including the Crusades, Galileo, and Marco Polo. The album's three singles are "The Chevalier," "Serenade of Flames," and "When Canvas Starts To Burn."

Death & Legacy continues the development of the band into a symphonic metal or melodic metal group. More orchestrations were used in the album and a perfection of balance between melody and power was created. Oliver Philipps produced the album along with writing the orchestrations. The band again called on some guest musicians, including Ailyn of Sirenia, Charlotte Wessels of Delain, Amanda Somerville of Epica and Lanvall of Edenbridge, to help in making the album what many fans consider a Serenity masterpiece.

All photos & artworks were done by Stefan Heilemann, based on a concept by Thomas Buchberger & Georg Neuhauser.

== History ==
Death & Legacy was released on February 25, 2011 through Napalm Records. It is the last album featuring keyboardist Mario Hirzinger, who later quit the band for personal reasons.

Death & Legacy features 14 tracks including 2 interludes and 2 instrumental tracks. The Limited Edition album contains two additional tracks while the Asian/Japanese release has these additional bonus track as well as an additional seventeenth track, a re-recording version of "Guiding Light." The album is somewhat of a concept album, featuring figures from history including Mary, Queen of Scots, Joan of Arc, and Galileo. The band stays true to the power metal roots, adding unique orchestrations and choral voices to the album.

=== Concept ===
Death & Legacy can be considered a concept album of sorts. The album's tracks are based on historical figures and events in history, a concept that Serenity would use on their next album.

- 'New Horizons' – The exploits and adventures of England's Sir Francis Drake.
- 'The Chevalier' - Giacomo Casanova and the woman who resisted his seduction.
- 'Far from Home' - The Portuguese explorer Bartolomeu Dias who sailed around the southernmost tip of Africa.
- 'Heavenly Mission' - Jacques de Molay, a Knight Templar, during the last years of the Crusades.
- 'State of Siege' – The terror of Gen. Hernán Cortés and the siege of Tenochtitlan, through the eyes of a shipmate.
- 'Changing Fate' – A ballad with Elizabeth I and Sir Francis Drake
- 'When Canvas Starts To Burn' - Albrecht Dürer, the German theorist and painter.
- 'Serenade of Flames' - Heinrich Kramer, an inquisitor against witchcraft and advocate of the Malleus Maleficarum.
- 'Youngest of Widows' – The reign, implications, and execution of Mary, Queen of Scots.
- 'Beyond Desert Sands' - Marco Polo and his travels to southeast asia and China.
- 'To India's Shores' – The voyage and times of Christopher Columbus.
- 'My Legacy' - Galileo Galilei’s persecution and his blindness.

=== Music video and singles ===
Death & Legacy spawned three singles with "The Chevalier", "Serenade of Flames", and "When Canvas Starts To Burn".

A music video was shot for "The Chevalier", the album's lead single. The video was shot in Schloss Matzen castle, which is located in the west part of Austria. The video was shot during winter in the castle rooms, in the style and fashion of the second half of 18th century, during the Rococo and early Romanticism periods. Georg, who plays Casanova, is seen riding on a black horse and carrying a falcon, mixed with scenes where women with masks attempt to seduce him. Ailyn, Casanova's lover, is then seen in a room with Georg; both looking at the mirror. She then walks between trees and a lake in the park, and then sings alone. Clips of a horse and a falcon in a slow motion are also shown, along with scenes in which Georg and Ailyn are sitting with other band members around the dining table. The video ends with two of them singing together outside, as the sun illuminates them. The song and video was dedicated to Giacomo Casanova and was released on January 24, 2011.

Lead vocalist Georg Neuhauser stated this about making the music video, "It was an awesome experience for everybody! This time, we worked together with Salvatore Perrone, an Italian director. We knew what we wanted and even tho it was not easy, we all worked as a big team, and this was the surplus. It took us nearly 3 days, shooting under the snow and rigid temperatures of our land, Tyrol in Austria. We also used some animals, as horses and falcons and those elements gave the storyboard a realistic flavor." The video was released on January 24, 2011.

The second single was "When Canvas Starts To Burn", and it also has an accompanying music video. It was shot in a studio in Tyrol, Austria, with band members playing and singing the song during a storm. It's mixed with scenes of girls playing the violin and posing on a red velvet bed. The song and video were dedicated to Albrecht Dürer, a northern renaissance painter on whom the lyrics are based. The video took one day to shoot and was released on November 14, 2011.

A teaser for the single "Serenade of Flames" was also shot by the band.

== Reception ==
Professional ratings
Review scores
Source	Rating
Allmusic	4.5/5 stars
About.com	3.5/5 stars
Sputnik Music	3.5/5 stars
Metalstorm.net	7.8/10 stars
The Metal Crypt	4.75/5 stars
That Devil Music	9.5/10 stars
Music News	4/5 stars

The Dutch review website Kwadratuur rated the album 3.5 stars out of 5, concluding that 'Death & Legacy' is a very entertaining album with undeniable craftsmanship. The album has a common thread in that each song is hung on a historical figure, performed with conviction, holding the listener's attention by their variety.

The Golden Bird rates the album an A−, stating "Overall, 'Death & Legacy' is a fine album. It is everything that symphonic power metal represents taken to its outermost limits."

A Metal Crypt review states, "The songwriting is outstanding and there are no weak tracks. The band members' individual performances are top notch and the playing is tight, without strangling the emotion of the songs. Even the subject matter, Templars, Age of Discovery explorers, kings, queens and scientists, is larger than life," and, "Any serious discussion about Symphonic Power Metal should now include Serenity. That is, if you can stop singing songs from Death & Legacy long enough to have a conversation," giving the band a 4.52 out of 5. Overall, Metal Crypt gives the album a 4.75 out 5.

Metal Blog reviewed Death & Legacy and states, "Death & Legacy is highly entertaining all the way through, with its well crafted music, lyrics and all around theme to the record..... There's also a lot of awesome with 16 tracks on the disc complied of quality, catchy tunes and atmospheric interludes."

All Music and Sputnik Music both gave Death & Legacy 3.5 stars out of 5.

== Track listing ==
No.	Title	Length
1.	"Set Sail To…" (instrumental intro)	0:26
2.	"New Horizons"	6:49
3.	"The Chevalier" (featuring Ailyn)	5:32
4.	"Far from Home"	4:48
5.	"Heavenly Mission"	5:23
6.	"Prayer" (interlude featuring Ailyn)	1:23
7.	"State of Siege"	6:51
8.	"Changing Fate" (featuring Amanda Somerville)	5:42
9.	"When Canvas Starts To Burn"	4:47
10.	"Serenade of Flames" (featuring Charlotte Wessels)	4:55
11.	"Below Eastern Skies" (instrumental interlude)	1:35
12.	"Beyond Desert Sands"	4:50
13.	"Lament" (interlude featuring Fabio D’Amore)	0:45
14.	"My Legacy"	4:45

Limited Edition Release
No.	Title	Length
1.	"Set Sail To…" (instrumental intro)	0:26
2.	"New Horizons"	6:49
3.	"The Chevalier" (featuring Ailyn)	5:32
4.	"Far from Home"	4:48
5.	"Heavenly Mission"	5:23
6.	"Prayer" (interlude featuring Ailyn)	1:23
7.	"State of Siege"	6:48
8.	"Changing Fate" (featuring Amanda Somerville)	5:43
9.	"When Canvas Starts To Burn"	4:51
10.	"Serenade of Flames" (featuring Charlotte Wessels)	4:51
11.	"Youngest of Widows"	4:08
12.	"Below Eastern Skies" (instrumental interlude)	1:35
13.	"Beyond Desert Sands"	4:40
14.	"To India’s Shores"	4:34
15.	"Lament" (interlude)	0:45
16.	"My Legacy"	4:45

Asian/Japanese Releases(s)
No.	Title	Length
17.	"Guiding Light (re-recorded)"	7:07

== Personnel ==
=== The Band ===
- Georg Neuhauser – Lead and Backing Vocals
- Thomas Buchberger – Lead, Rhythm, and Bass Guitars
- Mario Hirzinger – Keyboards
- Andreas Schipflinger – Drums

=== Guest Musicians ===
- Ailyn (Sirenia) - Female Vocals (on Track #3 and #6)
- Amanda Somerville (Avantasia and Epica) - Female Vocals (on Track #8)
- Charlotte Wessels (Delain) - Female Vocals (on Track #10)
- Lanvall - On Track #14 (Edenbridge)
- Oliver Philipps – Additional Keyboards and Piano

== Production ==
- Produced by Oliver Philipps, Jan Vacik, Thomas Buchberger & Georg Neuhauser
- All songs written by Thomas Buchberger, Mario Hirzinger and Georg Neuhauser, except "Below Eastern Skies."
- "Below Eastern Skies" written by Lanvall.
- Arranged by Serenity, Jan Vacik and Oliver Philipps
- "Lament" translated by Domenica Barbaro
- "Lament" performed by Fabio D'Amore
- Drum recordings by Jan Vacik
- Choir arrangements and recordings by Lanvall
- Orchestrations written by Oliver Philipss
- Lead vocal recordings by Oliver Philipps and Lanvall
- Guitar & bass recordings, drum editing, additional editing & preproduction by Thomas Buchberger
- Mix and mastering by Jan Vacik at Dreamsound Studios
