= Words Untold & Dreams Unlived =

Album by Serenity

Studio album by Serenity
- Released: (Europe) 27 April 2007
- Recorded: Dreamscape Studios, Munich, Germany
- Genre: Progressive metal, power metal
- Length: 47:28
- Label: Napalm Records
- Producer: Jan Vacik and Oliver Philipps

Serenity chronology
Engraved Within (2005)	Words Untold & Dreams Unlived (2007)	Fallen Sanctuary (2008)

Professional ratings
Review scores
Source	Rating
Metal Temple	8/10

Words Untold & Dreams Unlived is the first full-length studio album by symphonic metal band Serenity released on April 27, 2007, in Europe and on May 8 in North America, followed by releases in Russia, Japan and south-eastern Asia. The album was released under Napalm Records and produced by Jan Vacik and Oliver Philipps at Dreamsound Studios in Munich. The album was then released in Russia and Japan. The album contains 10 tracks, including songs that appeared on Serenity's demo album Engraved Within (tracks 5, 6, 8, and 10). Words Untold & Dreams Unlived has all the elements and strong points of a power metal album, but not as many melodic and symphonic tones as in Serenity's later albums.

== Track listing ==
No.	Title	Length
1.	"Canopus 3"	4:31
2.	"Reduced to Nothingness"	4:55
3.	"Words Untold" (instrumental)	0:58
4.	"Circle of My 2nd Life"	5:33
5.	"Engraved Within"	6:22
6.	"Forever"	6:43
7.	"Dreams Unlived" (instrumental)	0:51
8.	"Dead Man Walking"	4:54
9.	"From Where the Dark Is Born"	6:18
10.	"Thriven"	6:23

== Personnel ==
=== The band ===
- Georg Neuhauser – Lead Vocals
- Thomas Buchberger – Lead and Rhythm Guitars
- Simon Holzknecht – Bass Guitar
- Mario Hirzinger – Keyboards and Back Vocals
- Andreas Schipflinger – Drums and Backing Vocals

=== Guest musicians ===
- Lanvall from (Edenbridge)
- Axumis/Maggo Wenzel from (Tristwood/Inzest) - Death Vocals (on track #2)

== Production ==
- Produced by Jan Vacik
- All songs written by Buchberger/Hirzinger/Neuhauser, except "Dead Man Walking."
- "Dead Man Walking" written by Buchberger/Neuhauser/Hirzinger/Anker
- Additional recordings at Serenity Studios Wörgl/Mayrhofen
- Mixed by Teropekka Virtanen and Jan Vacik
- Mastered by Mika Jussila
