= Serenity (band) =

Austrian band

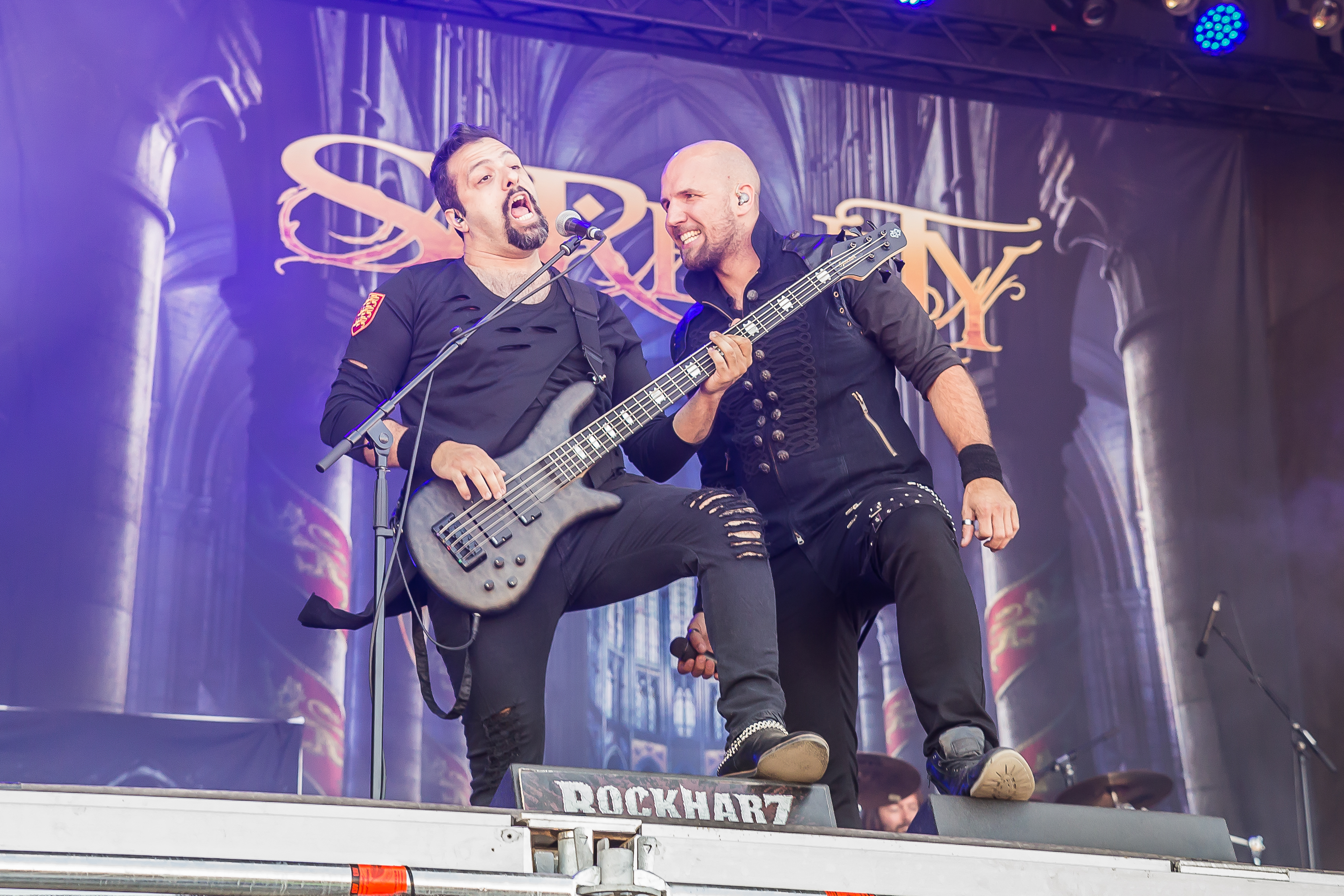
- Serenity in 2018

Background information
- Origin: Tyrol, Austria
- Genres: Symphonic metal, power metal, progressive metal
- Years active: 2001−present
- Label: Napalm
- Members: Georg Neuhauser; Andreas Schipflinger; Fabio D'Amore; Christian Hermsdörfer; Marco Pastorino
- Past members: Matthias Anker; Stefan Schipflinger; Stefan Wanker; Simon Holzknecht; Mario Hirzinger; Thomas Buchberger; Clementine Delauney
- Website: www.serenity-band.com

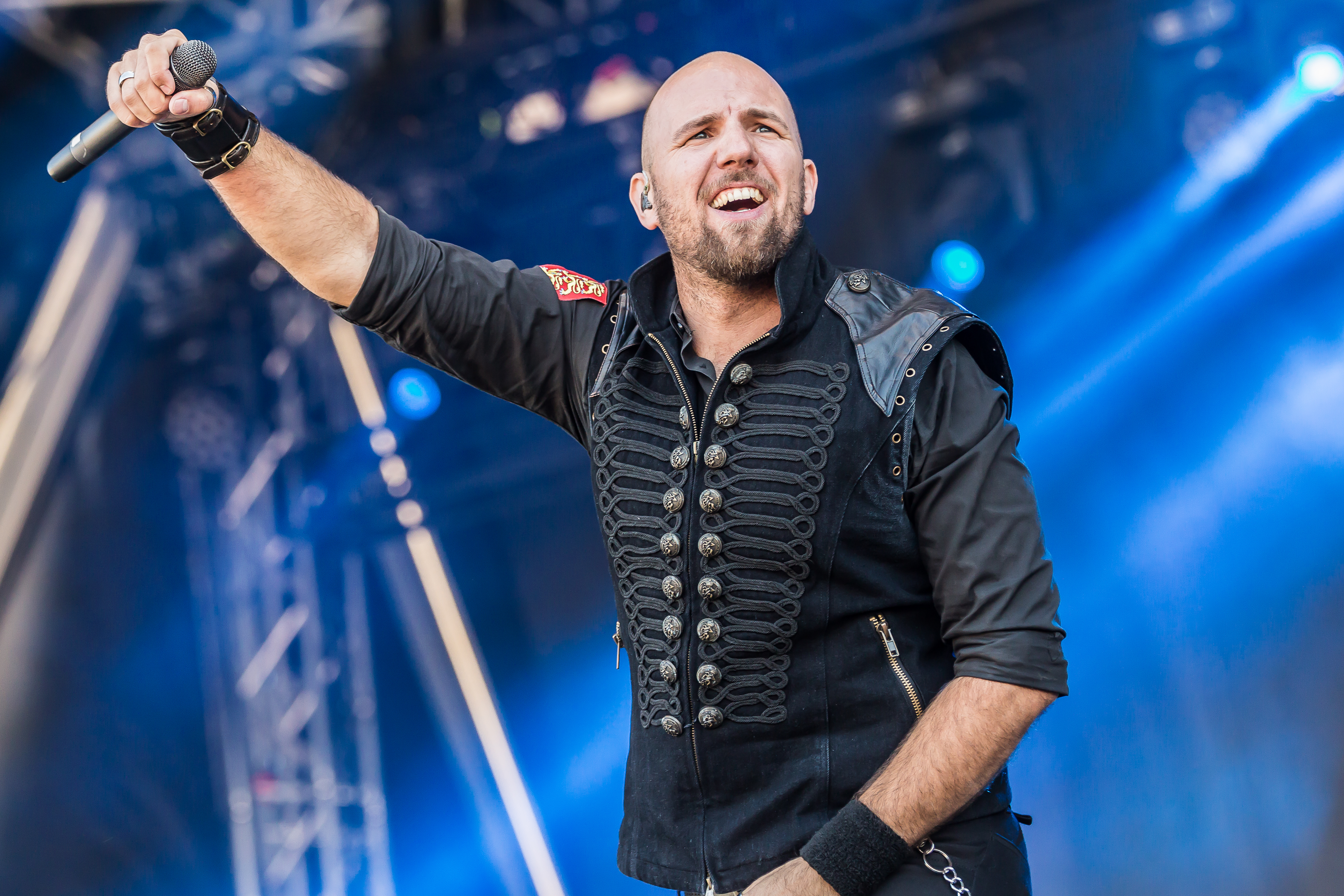
Singer Georg Neuhauser at Rockharz 2018

Serenity is an Austrian symphonic power metal band, originally formed back in 2001. They became a more stable group with a consistent line-up in 2004, when it also began using more progressive and power influences than earlier. They have defined their genre with more melodic and symphonic metal elements.

Most of their music focuses on important historical figures and events, including Sir Francis Drake, Marco Polo, Galileo, Beethoven and Napoleon. They currently have produced eight studio albums and two demos.

The members of Serenity have taken their talents outside of their music and have shared their interests and devotions with others. Vocalist Georg Neuhauser is a M.Sc. Dr. of historical science. He is currently working at the university of Innsbruck. Drummer Andreas Schipflinger is a research and development technician in the construction of cochlea implant system hearing aids. Bassist Fabio D'Amore is a sound engineer, studio manager, as well as a teacher for both the bass and music theory. He also fronts the metal band Mirrormaze and has performed on tours with Xandria.

Former members Mario Hirzinger and Simon Holzknecht work as a nurse in a kidney dialysis center and a research and development technician in the optical and crystal manufacturing industry respectively. Thomas Buchberger, former lead guitarist, is an engineer of IT, marketing and PR and does web layout and design. He hopes to somehow continue collaborating in minor aspects with future Serenity albums.

== Biography ==
=== Beginnings (2001–2005) ===
Serenity began in 2001 with Matthias Anker (rhythm guitarist & lead vocals), Stefan Schipflinger (lead guitarist), Stefan Wanker (bass guitarist), and current drummer Andreas Schipflinger, and until 2012, keyboardist Mario Hirzinger.

The first gigs the band had were quite successful and the next step was recording a demo EP and trying to get signed to a record label. In late summer, 2001, they entered the BHS Studios in Breitenbach and recorded their first demo CD Starseed V.R.. It was released on February 9, 2002 and well received by both the fans and the press. The album was written by the members of Serenity with the layout and artwork done by planet-bluescreen.com. The album featured Katharina Neuschmid, Jürgen Huter and Martin Anker as guest musicians.

The band sent out numerous copies of Starseed V.R. to various record labels, but without any success. New gigs followed in 2002 and 2003, which established them as one of the leading metal bands of the region. Unfortunately, rhythm guitarist and lead vocalist Matthias Anker decided to leave the band for personal reasons at the end of 2003.

In February 2004, the members of Serenity got in touch with Thomas Buchberger, Georg Neuhauser, and Simon Holzknecht. Thomas and Georg has previously recorded their own demo in 2003 and were in the process of finding other musicians to join their metal project. After listening to their demo, it was bass player Stefan Wanker who recommended integrating them into Serenity, but he realized that he had to leave the band, which he offered to do. Guitarist Stefan Schipflinger, who didn't agree with this decision, also left the band.

The new line up decided to keep the name of Serenity and is considered to be founded in 2004, in Tyrol, Austria, consisting of new members Georg Neuhauser (lead vocals), Thomas Buchberger (lead & rhythm guitars), Simon Holzknecht (bass guitarist). In an interview with Valkyrian Music, bassist Fabio D'Amore, who would join the band in 2010, talks about the band name Serenity, saying, "Serenity is a sci-fi movie, based on the fanta-western TV series called "Firefly". It's an awesome movie, and the also the TV series is incredible. When the band was put together, the influence of "Firefly" on our artistic work was huge, so the logical result was taking the name of the spacecraft as the band's name."

This line up brought some subtle musical changes, including introducing a new lead voice, basing the songs on a more 'metal' riffing with a high demand on melodies and orchestral parts. With this line up, Serenity's first crucial test took place on August 2, 2004, when they successfully supported Ronnie James Dio.

Soon after, the band started recording a demo album, Engraved Within, on their own. The album was mixed by Jan Vacik at Dreamscape Studios in Munich, Germany and was released on April 17, 2005. Engraved Within received outstanding reviews all over Europe, among them 'Demo of the Month' in German Rock Hard and Metal Hammer magazines. One review of the album, from Rock Report, states, "this 7-track demo clearly shows what great potential this band has. This material is so strong that it can only be a matter of time before this guys get signed."

A website, selaludiam.com, stated "Serenity is a highly gifted band from Austria and they deliver us a killer demo, which blew me totally away."

=== Words Untold & Dreams Unlived (2005–2007) ===
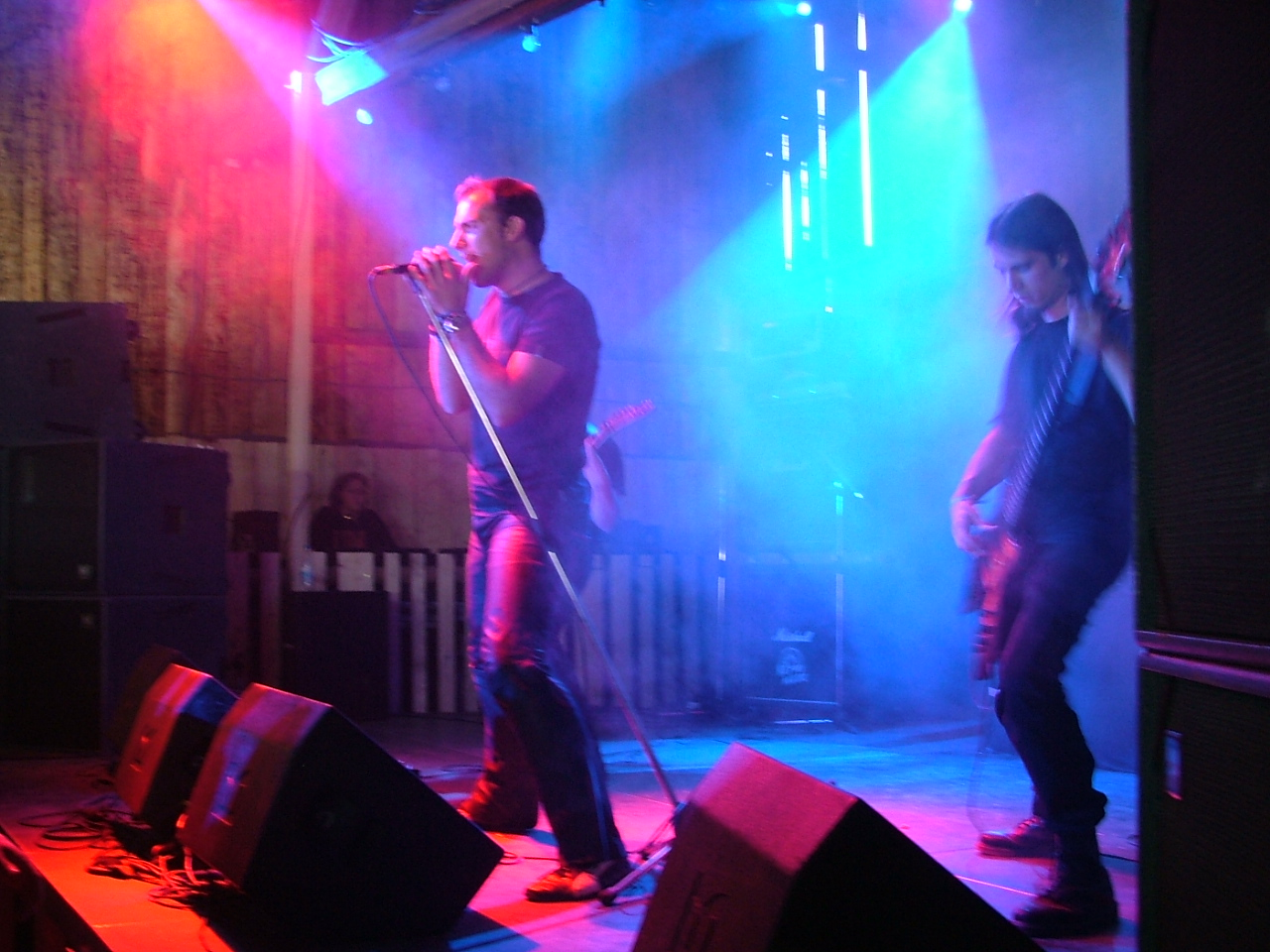
Serenity in concert, early 2007.

Although some labels were interested to work with the band, they decided to produce a self-financed full-length album which would increase the chances for a more valuable deal including touring activities. Words Untold & Dreams Unlived was a project that took place throughout Europe. The album was recorded at Dreamscape Studios in Munich as well as at home in Austria, mixed and mastered at Finnvox Studios in Helsinki, Finland, orchestral parts were produced by Hans Valter in Czech Republic and the whole artwork was done by Seth-Design in Athens, Greece.

After fruitful negotiations with Napalm Records of Austria, a deal was signed on December 1, 2006. Lead vocalist Georg Neuhauser stated, "We decided to sign with Napalm Record because, first of all, they are a very good label, have good distributors, and they are from Austria so it’s easier to work with them. You know, when I have a problem or a question, I just call them, and you will always reach someone in the company, so it’s quite easy to handle."

Words Untold & Dreams Unlived was finally released on April 27, 2007, in Europe and on May 8 in North America, followed by releases in Russia, Japan and south-eastern Asia.

In 2007, Serenity had begun touring, first with Morgana Lefay in Sweden, Threshold in Great Britain, and then a "hero" for the band, Kamelot. Later on, they toured with bands such as Adagio and Sacred Steel. The band said that the tour of ten European countries brought about new friends and admirers and raised expectations for their future album.

=== Fallen Sanctuary (2007–2010) ===
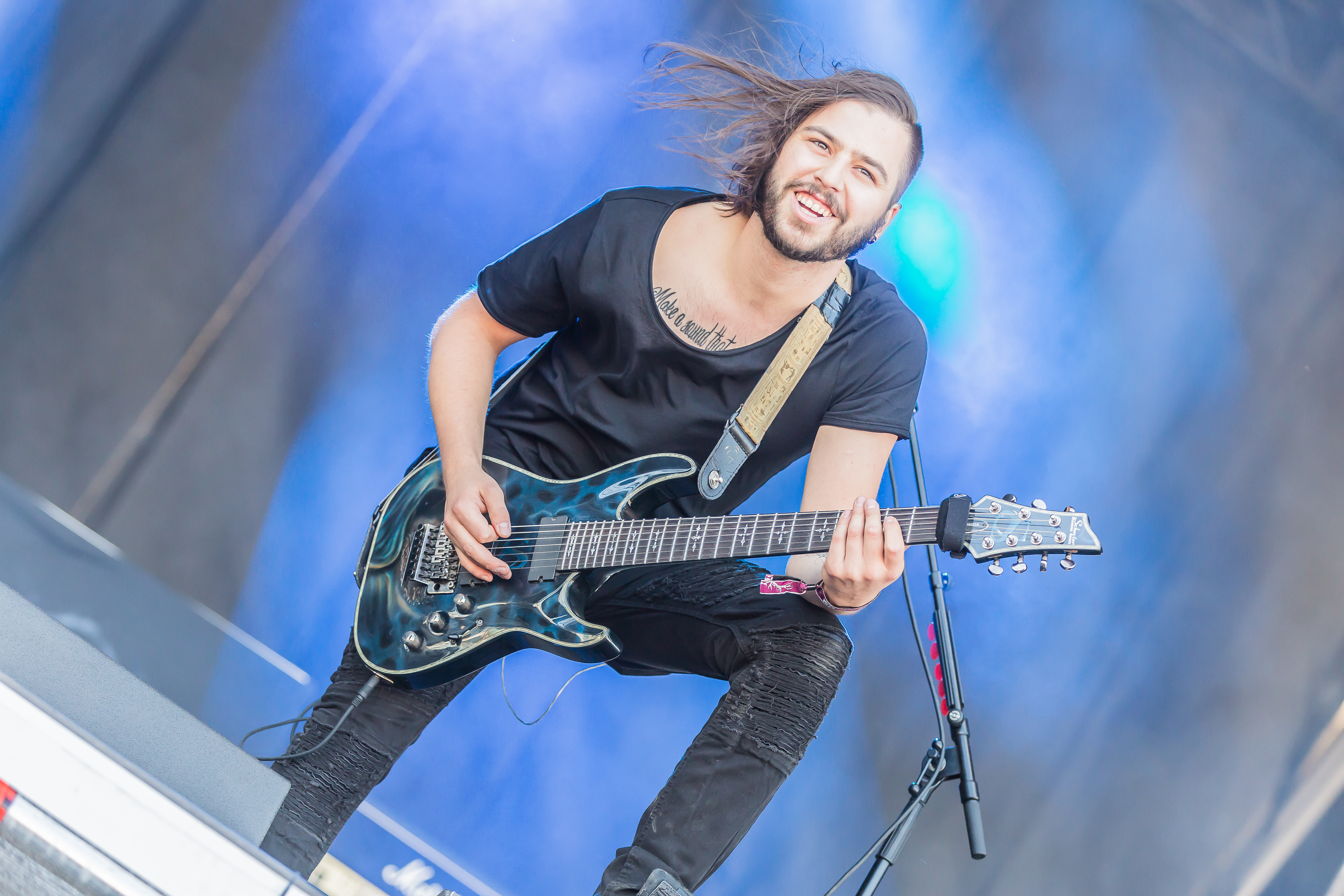
Guitarist Nik Müller at Rockharz 2018

At last, time had come to write a new album. Music styles would grow, mature, and progress on the new work. During an interview with Thomas Buchberger, he stated, "The songs on Words Untold & Dreams Unlived were the first songs the band wrote together. And some songs were already one to two years old when the band was formed, written by Georg and me or by Mario. The newer songs sounded different from that due to the fact that everything was polished and written together. Now with Fallen Sanctuary the music style changed a little bit more into melodic metal, but still has everything that stands for Serenity: choirs, orchestra, heavy riffing; more of everything than on our debut. The songs are tighter and more catchy than ever before."

Once again, the band constructed a strong team around them, including Oliver Philipps (orchestral production), Lanvall (vocal recordings), Jacob Hansen (mix and mastering), Gustavo Sazes (artwork) and Jan Vacik (drum & bass recordings, arranging and editing), to start their second album. Guitars, keys & some backing vocals were recorded by Thomas & Mario in their home studios. The production of the new album began in December 2007 at Dreamscape Studios and was finished in April 2008.

Fallen Sanctuary hit stores on the August 29, 2008, in Europe and on September 9, 2008, in the US and Canada. It also received a release in Japan by Soundholic records. Serenity used this opportunity to showcase their talents and perform at an album release party in Wörgl. The album's only single is "Velatum." A video for "Velatum" was also done by the band, which was shot by director Robert Geir and "Wildruf" camera crew from July 2 to 5, 2008. The video for "Velatum" was released online on July 17.

Fallen Sanctuary was met with strong reviews instantly in the metal and symphonic metal world. A review from Sea of Tranquility states "Serenity is one of the best bands to arrive on the metal scene in quite some time. This album is a thing of beauty. The orchestral arrangements and huge choirs really add that progressive element to the music that puts this album in the upper echelon of metal releases...."

The heavy metal website Metal Crypt states, "The production is absolutely first-class, and the vocal mix puts Neuhauser front and center — the kind of recording job where you swear you can hear the guy's nose hairs — it's a demanding position for a singer, as it leaves no room for error, but he rises to the challenge with an amazing performance."

==== Fallen Sanctuary Tour and Simon Quits ====
In spring 2009, Serenity supported Kamelot on their "Rule The World Tour 2009". Later that same year, Serenity toured with longtime friends Edenbridge. Some weeks later, Serenity was featured as a special guest on Threshold's "Essence Of Progression" Tour.

On August 25, 2010, Serenity stated via their website "In Serenity's history, this is the first truly sad message we have to publish. Simon Holzknecht - bass guitars - quits Serenity due to personal reasons." Only a short time later Serenity would welcome Fabio D'Amore (formerly of Pathosray and Fairyland, current vocalist and bassist for the band Mirrormaze) as the new man behind the bass. Lead vocalist Georg Neuhauser previously met Fabio in 2009 while doing a guest appearance for Fairyland on their album Score to a New Beginning.

=== Death & Legacy (2010–2012) ===
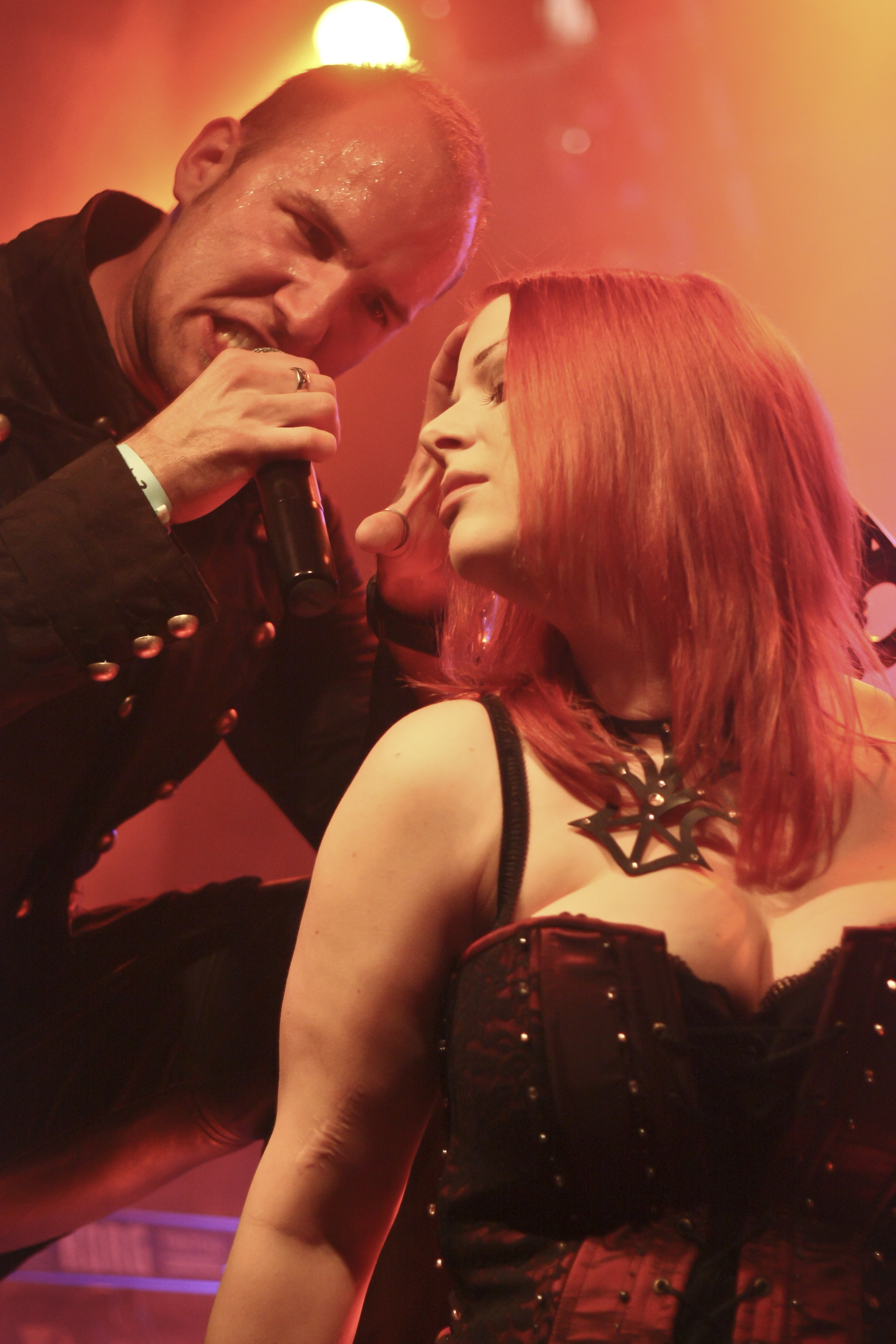
Singer Georg Neuhauser in a duet with Lisa Middelhauve, 2011

In late 2010, the band went back to the studio for the follow-up album of Fallen Sanctuary. Again, they chose Oliver Philipps to do the orchestra production, however, the album mix was done by Jan Vacik. Oliver Philipps also produced the album. The band again called on some guest musicians, including Amanda Somerville and Lanvall of Edenbridge, to help in making the album a Serenity masterpiece. Many thought the addition of a female voice was an incredible concept, including Rocktopia, which states in a review of Death & Legacy, "The decision to add some female vocals to the tracks is inspired and adds a whole new spectrum for Serenity to explore."

Death & Legacy was released on February 25, 2011, through Napalm Records. The album was well received among fans and magazines. Sputnik Music rates the album 3.5 out of 5, stating "Death and Legacy is the sound of a band who know what they're doing and who do it very well."

The Golden Bird rates the album an A−, stating "Overall, Death & Legacy is a fine album. It is everything that symphonic power metal represents taken to its outermost limits."

A Metal Crypt review states, "The songwriting is outstanding and there are no weak tracks. The band members' individual performances are top notch and the playing is tight, without strangling the emotion of the songs. Even the subject matter, Templars, Age of Discovery explorers, kings, queens and scientists, is larger than life," and, "Any serious discussion about Symphonic Power Metal should now include Serenity. That is, if you can stop singing songs from Death & Legacy long enough to have a conversation," giving the band a 4.52 out of 5. Overall, Metal Crypt gives the album a 4.75 out 5.

Metal Blog reviewed Death & Legacy and states, "Death & Legacy is highly entertaining all the way through, with its well crafted music, lyrics and all around theme to the record. There's also a lot of awesome with 16 tracks on the disc complied of quality, catchy tunes and atmospheric interludes."

==== Music video and singles ====
Death & Legacy spawned three singles with "The Chevalier", "Serenade of Flames", and "When Canvas Starts To Burn".

A music video was shot for "The Chevalier", the album's lead single. The video was shot in Schloss Matzen castle, which is located in the west part of Austria. The video was shot during winter in the old manor, in the style and fashion of the second half of the 18th century, during the Rococo and early Romanticism periods. Neuhauser, who plays Giacomo Casanova, is seen riding on a black horse and carrying a falcon, mixed with scenes where women with masks attempt to seduce him. Ailyn, Casanova's lover, is then seen in a room with Neuhauser, both looking at the mirror. She then walks between trees and a lake in the park, and then sings alone in the manor. Clips of a horse and a falcon are also shown, along with scenes in which Neuhauser and Ailyn are sitting with other band members around a table with other band members. The video ends with all of them singing together outside, as the sun illuminates them. The song and video was dedicated to Giacomo Casanova and was released on January 24, 2011.

Lead vocalist Georg Neuhauser commented on the making of the music video, saying, "It was an awesome experience for everybody! This time, we worked together with Salvatore Perrone, an Italian director. We knew what we wanted and even tho it was not easy, we all worked as a big team, and this was the surplus. It took us nearly 3 days, shooting under the snow and rigid temperatures of our land, Tyrol in Austria. We also used some animals, as horses and falcons and those elements gave the storyboard a realistic flavor."

The second single was "When Canvas Starts To Burn", and it also has an accompanying music video. The video was shot in a studio located in Tyrol, Austria, with band members playing and singing the song during a firestorm. It is mixed with scenes of girls playing the violin and posing on a red velvet bed. The song and video were dedicated to Albrecht Dürer, a northern renaissance painter on whom the lyrics are based. The video took one day to shoot and was released on November 14, 2011.

A teaser for the single "Serenade of Flames" was also shot by the band.

==== Death & Legacy Tour, Mario Quits ====
After a brief stint of shows in the UK and Switzerland, and a headlining show in Germany on September 9, the Death & Legacy tour began. Serenity hit the road with Delain, Van Canto, and Xandria, then followed up with a show at the legendary Prog Power USA festival in 2012 in Atlanta, Georgia, United States. The band then embarked in the "Out of the Dark Festival Tour," again with Van Canto and Xandria, Tristania, and Amberian Dawn. This helped Serenity to reach out for new fans and gain headliner status across European venues. In a review of the ProgPower Fest 2012, a fan states "With the duality of Georg & Clemi on vocals, Fabio’s energetic bass playing, Thomas’ incredible guitar playing, the symphonic epicness coming from Mario's keys, and Andi's spot on drumming, they really stole the show." In a poll of the audiences' favorite band of ProgPower USA XIII, Serenity topped the charts as the overall favorite. The band was overwhelmed by the positive responses that they received at ProgPower USA, as they received "standing ovations, neverending applause...." This helped Serenity grab headliner status across many European venues.

On October 30, 2012, Serenity announced that founder Mario Hirzinger decided to leave the band due to several reasons. They state "Mario can still be seen in live situations whenever he has time and fun playing with us. Though he may never return as songwriter nor as member of organization/management." Mario can be seen on occasion as a guest musician during Serenity's live concerts.

Serenity continued to tour all over Europe, gaining reputation as a power music force with in the symphonic metal genre. Again praised by fans and magazines, the band continued to attract new fans worldwide.

=== War of Ages (2012–2014) ===
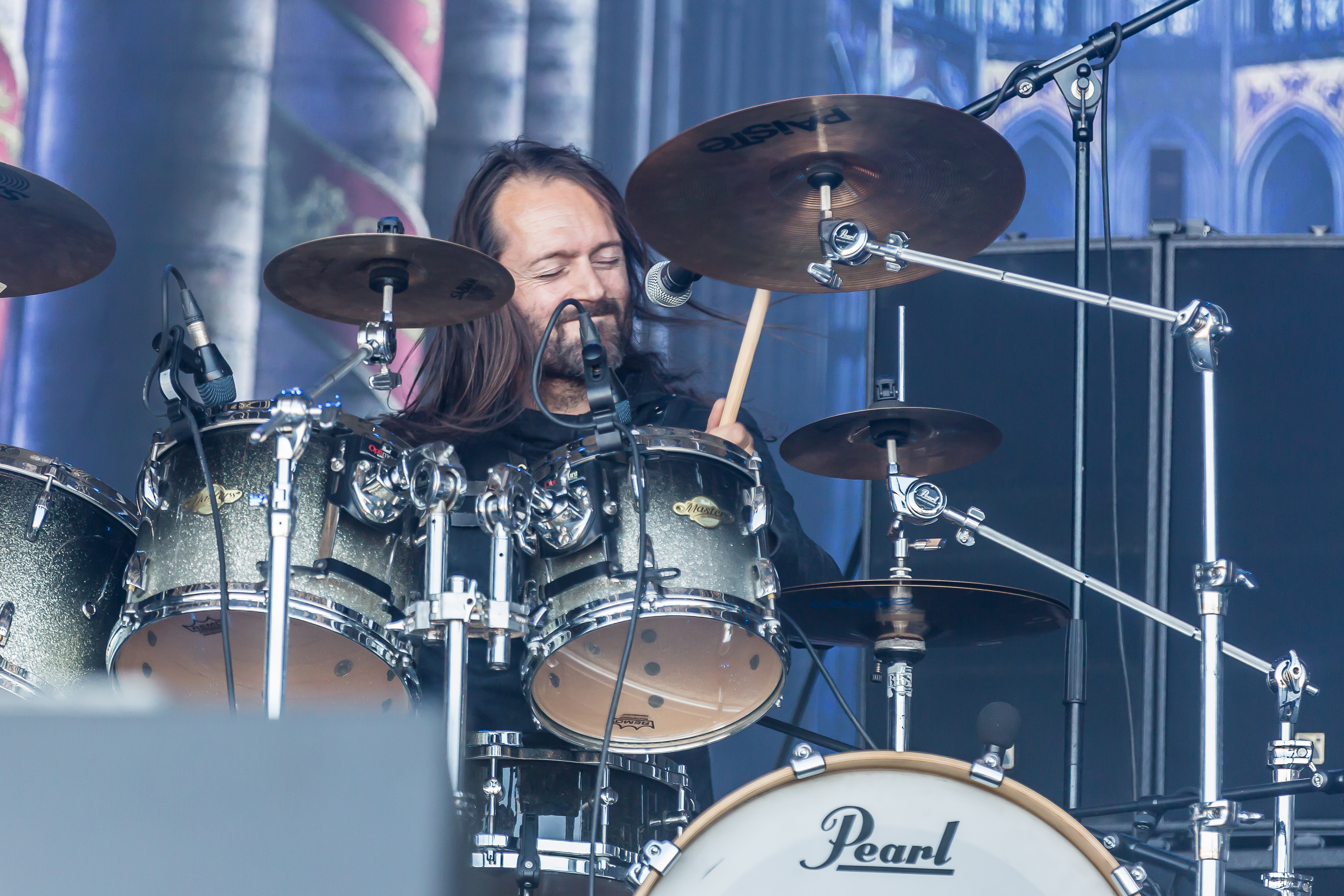
Drummer Andreas Schipflinger at Rockharz 2018

Serenity began recording their new album in 2012, this time with a new female vocalist, Clémentine Delauney who joined the band in late 2012 after intensive touring activities with the band. Clémentine added a truly dynamic and melodic female counterpart to Georg, broadening Serenity's sound even more.

Clémentine stated in an interview, "We wanted to keep the direction of having each song dealing with a famous character in history. And when Tom and Georg started to write the music, it appeared to be a bit darker than the previous record. So all in all when we had all the songs, we were like “Yeah, the general feeling is a bit more heavy and darker”. There are different influences; there's one song which is very melancholic. So we thought that maybe we should try to bring topics of darker times. So we found characters who had their own inner problems or state problems, like Napoleon with wars and we brought in Beethoven with his inside war with fighting against these diseases making him deaf, and the Bathory Countess also starting to get mad and stuff like this. We gathered a lot of different topics, and we saw that the red line was a war, whether it was an outside physical war, or it's someone fighting against himself, or inner war. So we called it like this. And it was different periods of times, so it was not representing one period especially, but several."

Announcement for the official release of the album came via the band's website, stating, "While staying true to all Serenity trademarks such as symphonic orchestras, heavy rhythms, amazing melodic vocals & bombastic choirs we also brought in some new elements in form of various new sounds in the Serenity universe and a constant implementation of female vocals supporting outstanding singer Georg Neuhauser.

War of Ages was released on March 22, 2013, in Europe and in April across North America and Asia, via Napalm Records. The album contains 10 songs with 2 additional songs on the Limited Edition Version. The album also continues the historical concept that its predecessor, Death & Legacy, had previously established. The album contains songs about Beethoven, Napoleon, among others. It was again mixed and mastered by Jan Vacik at Dreamsound Studios.

The album came out to outstanding reviews both across Europe and North America. From Metal Underground, the review states "Many bands attempt to play symphonic metal, but Austria’s Serenity has mastered the art to such a degree that the mere mention of a new release spellbinds fans of the subgenre," and "Serenity takes the symphonic metal world by storm with its 'War of Ages.'"

Angry Metal Guy states, "To Serenity's credit, there isn’t a weak track in the bunch. Although everything sounds like it was lifted from better known contemporaries, it’s all high quality, memorable and very easy to like," and "This is by far Serenity's best release and a very enjoyable dose of symphonic power."

==== Music video, single, and War of Ages Over Europe ====
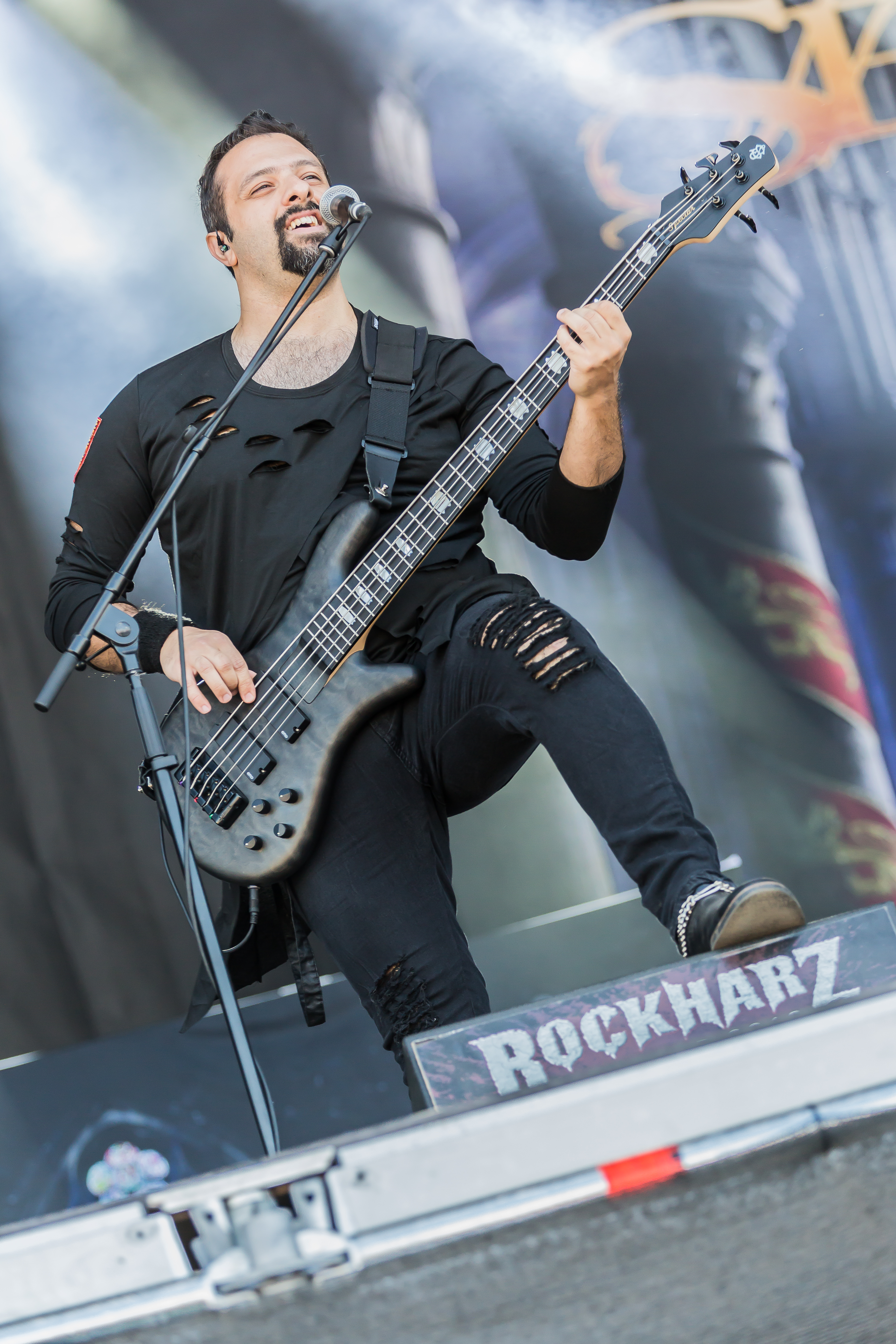
Bassist Fabio D’Amore at Rockharz 2018

A music video was shot for the lead off single "Wings of Madness" and released on March 28, 2013. The music video shows Clémentine in the role of Elizabeth Bathory, as portrayed in the legend, and lead vocalist, Georg Neuhauser, as her husband, who is off at war. Elizabeth struggles with her blood lust and can't seem to control it. The music video shows her alleged torment of others. Her husband cannot return home in time to save her as she dies at her own hands. "Wings of Madness" is War of Ages only single up to this point.

The War of Ages Over Europe Tour began shortly after and continued into 2014. Tour guests included Visions of Atlantis, Souldrinker, Beyond the Bridge, Midriff. The band announced that they would be joining Within Temptation on a small tour in March, stating "Serenity is going to support Within Temptation in Bratislava on March 12th and in Vienna (Gasometer) on March 15th!" Other tour stops will be Mons, Budapest, the Masters of Rock in the Czech Republic, and opening for Delain in the Netherlands as well as for Xandria in Germany.

=== Back to the Root (2015) ===
On February 3, 2015, Serenity announce via Facebook and their official website that lead guitarist Thomas Buchberger and female vocalist Clementine Delauney have parted ways with the band. An official statement by Thomas states, "....I was thinking about it for some time, the last 2-3 years exactly. And I decided to quit SERENITY permanently in 2014," and "The future with SERENITY: I told the guys, that if they need me and I am able to manage it, I will be there. Be it for a gig (like Innsbruck last year), or be it for future recordings. But for the moment being, I will not participate in the upcoming songwriting nor preproduction recordings. That's what would take too much time for me currently. I will and still am helping with online stuff too... And again: I don't rule out that one day I have more time left, or some fitting songs on my computer, I could still give those to them or participate a bit more on upcoming albums. If they want me/allow me to of course! But not now...".

Even though Tom states that he might be involved in future albums and possibly a gig or two, nothing formal has been committed to with the band.

Serenity stated, regarding Clémentine's departure, that "Though we love to add different voices to Georg’s one, we no longer think these moments will be significant enough to justify to have a female singer within our ranks. Once this said, it has the direct consequence to unbind Clementine’s musical fate to SERENITY’s. With a lot of regrets from both sides, we need to say that it has been a very intense and colorful chapter in SERENITY’s history to have welcomed such a great and nice singer and front-woman on a record and the concerts for the 2 years that followed. As hard as such a decision is to take, there is no hard feelings and we are happy to say that if, for practical reasons, we will welcome other guest singers for the live aspect, there is a common will to share the stage together again one day."

Clémentine adds "Serenity and I are parting ways almost in the same manner that we decided to start working together. You should not search for big plans behind all this or a big machinery, there is none. We acted upon our will and we are ending our collaboration here because ideas and circumstances have changed."

On October 27, 2015, Serenity announced on their homepage that they had finished recording their fifth album titled Codex Atlanticus. They also announced that album will be released on January 23, 2016.

In 2017, the band released their sixth studio album, called Lionheart.

In January 2020, the band released their seventh studio album called "The Last Knight". According to a Facebook post in November 2019, the album is a concept album based on the life of the Holy Roman Emperor Maximilian I.

== Members ==
Current members

- Andreas Schipflinger - drums, backing vocals (2001–present)
- Georg Neuhauser - lead vocals (2004–present)
- Fabio D'Amore - bass, backing vocals (2011–present)
- Chris Hermsdörfer- guitars (2015–present)
- Marco Pastorino - guitars (2023–present)

Former members

- Matthias Anker - rhythm guitar and vocals (2001–2003)
- Stefan Schipflinger - lead guitar (2001–2004)
- Stefan Wanker - bass (2001–2004)
- Simon Holzknecht - bass (2004–2010)
- Mario Hirzinger - keyboards, backing vocals (2001–2012)
- Clémentine Delauney - lead and backing vocals (2013–2015)
- Thomas Buchberger - lead and rhythm guitars (2004–2015)

Former session musicians

- Oliver Philipps - keyboards, piano (2008-2013)

Timeline

== Discography ==
=== Demos ===
- Starseed V.R. (2002)
- Engraved Within (2005)

=== Studio albums ===
- Words Untold & Dreams Unlived (2007)
- Fallen Sanctuary (2008)
- Death & Legacy (2011)
- War of Ages (2013)
- Codex Atlanticus (2016)
- Lionheart (2017)
- The Last Knight (2020)
- Nemesis AD (2023)

=== Singles ===
- "Velatum" (2008)
- "The Chevalier" (2011)
- "Serenade of Flames" (2011)
- "When Canvas Starts to Burn" (2011)
- "Wings of Madness" (2013)

=== Music videos ===
- "Velatum" (2008)
- "The Chevalier" (featuring Ailyn) (2011)
- "When Canvas Starts to Burn" (2011)
- "Wings of Madness" (2013)
- "Follow Me" (2016)
- "Spirit in the Flesh" (2016)
- "My Final Chapter" (2016)
- "Lionheart" (2017)
- "United" (2017)
- "Set the World on Fire" (2019)
- "Souls and Sins" (2019)
- "My Kingdom Comes" (2020)
- "In The Name Of Scotland" (2022)
- "Ritter, Tod und Teufel" (2023)
