= Georg Neuhauser =

Austrian metal vocalist (born 1982)

Dr. Georg Neuhauser
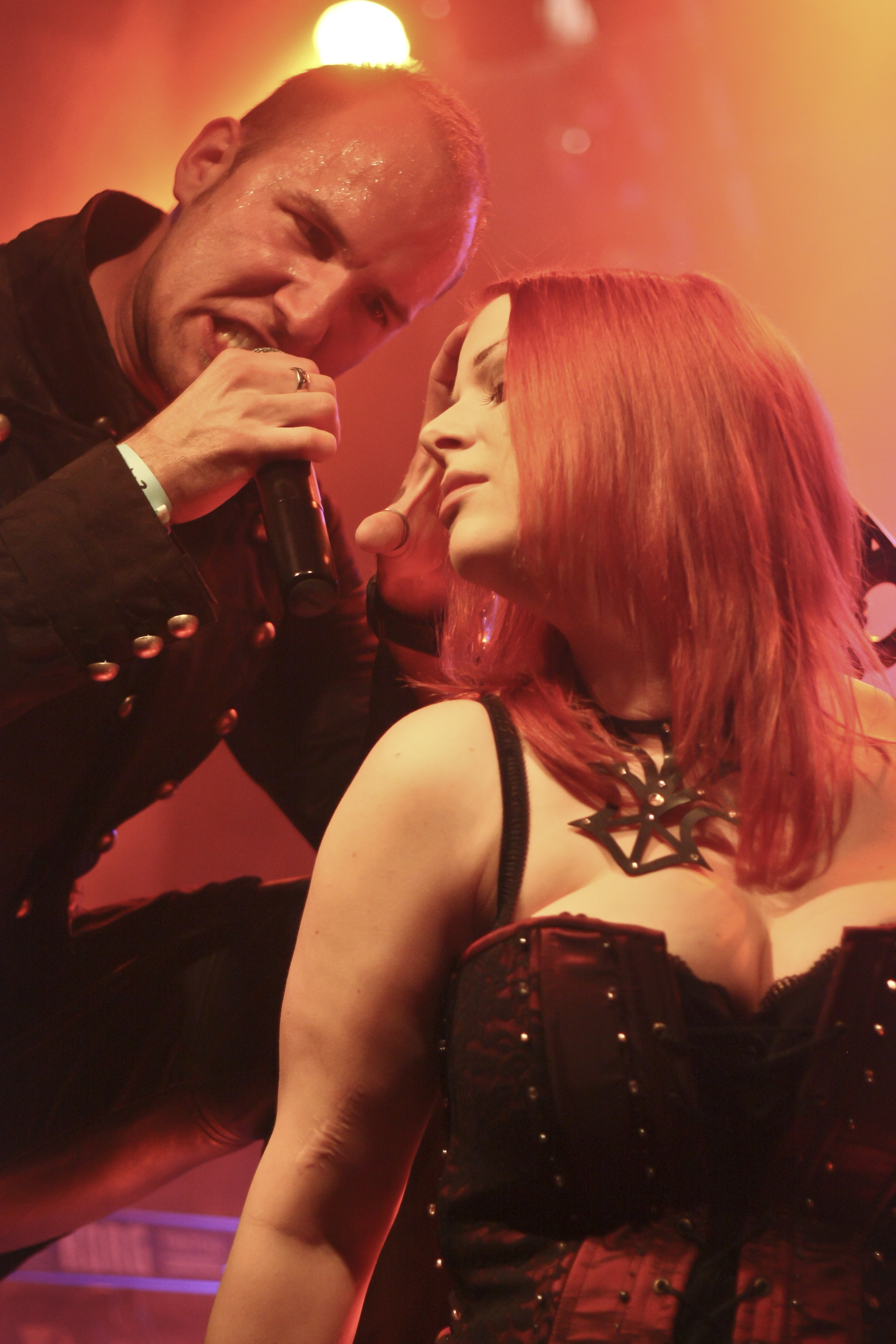
- Neuhauser performing in a duet with Lisa Middelhauve, 2011

Background information
- Born: Georg Neuhauser; 22 February 1982 (age 44)
- Origin: Innsbruck, Austria
- Genres: Symphonic metal, power metal, progressive metal
- Instrument: Vocals
- Years active: 2001–present
- Label: Napalm
- Member of: Serenity, Warkings
- Website: www.serenity-band.com

Georg Neuhauser (born February 22, 1982) is an Austrian metal vocalist, best known as the lead vocalist and songwriter for the Austrian symphonic power metal band Serenity. He helped create the stable line up of Serenity in 2004, and has released 4 full-length albums and 1 demo with the band. He has also appeared as guest vocalist on several albums, including Score to a New Beginning by Fairyland and The Human Contradiction by Delain.

== Musical career ==
=== Early years ===
Georg was born on 22 February 1982, and grew up in Innsbruck, Austria. He began his musical career early at the age of four, singing at home traditional folk music with his mother. It wasn't until he received the heavy metal album "Seventh Son of a Seventh Son" by Iron Maiden on his sixth birthday that heavy metal and power metal would greatly influence his life. He states that, "Since then I have been a rock and metal maniac."

He formed his first real band in 2000 with Thomas Buchberger, who would later join him as the guitarist for Serenity. Together with Thomas, they eventually made a demo CD in 2003 and tried to find others to join their metal project. Members of the then Serenity band came in contact with Georg and Thomas, and after listening to the demo CD, decided integrating them into the band. Bass player and guitarist, Stefan Wanker and Stefan Schipflinger, decided to leave the band, paving way for Georg and company to establish a consistent line up, formed in Tyrol, Austria. Georg and the newly reformed Serenity's first crucial test took place on 2 August 2004, when they successfully supported Ronnie James Dio in concert.

=== Engraved Within and Fallen Sanctuary ===
Soon after, the band started recording a demo album, Engraved Within, on their own. The album was released in the spring 2005 and immediately received outstanding reviews all over Europe. Among these honors was ‘’Demo of the Month’’ in German Rock Hard and Metal Hammer magazines.

Although some record labels were interested in Serenity, they decided to head back on their own to the studios, recording their first full-length album, a self-release, entitled Words Untold & Dreams Unlived. Georg wrote the album along with fellow band members Thomas Buchberger and Mario Hirzinger, and continued to be the lead vocalist.

Napalm Records finally signed Georg and Serenity to a contract on 1 Dec. 2006. Georg stated, "We decided to sign with Napalm Records because, first of all, they are a very good label, have good distributors, and they are from Austria so it’s easier to work with them. You know, when I have a problem or a question, I just call them, and you will always reach someone in the company, so it’s quite easy to handle." Words Untold & Dreams Unlived was released on 27 April 2007 with Kamelot, Threshold, and Adagio began.

In December 2007, Serenity hit the studios again, recording their next full-length album Fallen Sanctuary. After five months of recording, the album was complete. Fallen Sanctuary hit the stores on 29 August 2008 in Europe and on 9 September 2008 in the US and Canada.

=== Guest appearance and tour ===
Georg was called up to provide supporting vocals to the French power metal band Fairyland on their album Score to a New Beginning, providing a voice for five different song. Here, he would meet bassist Fabio D’Amore, who would later join Serenity in 2010.

"Serenity toured again with Kamelot in spring of 2009 to promote the new album." Later that year, they were featured as special guests on Threshold’s "Essence Of Progression" Tour.

=== Death & Legacy ===
In late 2010, Serenity went back to the studio for their follow up album, Death & Legacy. The band again called on some guest musicians, including Amanda Somerville of Trillium and Lanvall of Edenbridge, to help in making the album a Serenity masterpiece. Georg was interviewed for the metal site Nocturnal Euphony International about the new album, saying, "It’s another step forward in our career and we are grateful to all our fans and everybody who’s helping Serenity growing. We came up with the historical theme seen our passion about this topic, especially as regarding my personal formation. I’ve always been involved into history and historical characters, and their legacies. It was a clear and natural line we decided to follow, and I can say the result was awesome. I’m sure we will bring this on in the future..." Death & Legacy was released on 25 February 2011 through Napalm Records.

After a brief stint of shows in the UK and Switzerland, and a headlining show in Germany on 9 September, the Death & Legacy tour began. Serenity hit the road with bands including Delain, Van Canto, and Xandria, then followed up with a show at the legendary Prog Power USA festival in 2012 in Atlanta, Georgia, US. The band then embarked in the "Out of the Dark Festival Tour," again with Van Canto, Xandria, Tristania, and Amberian Dawn. This helped Serenity to reach out for new fans and gain headliner status across European venues. Serenity continued to tour all over Europe, gaining reputation as a music force within the symphonic metal genre. Again praised by fans and magazines, the band continued to attract new fans worldwide.

=== War of Ages ===
Georg and the band headed back to the studio for another album, War of Ages, in 2012. This time, Serenity added a second vocalist to the band in Clémentine Delauney. Clémentine added a dynamic and melodic female counterpart to Georg, broadening Serenity’s sound even more. Announcement for the official release of the new album came via the band's website, stating, "While staying true to all ‘’Serenity’’ trademarks such as symphonic orchestras, heavy rhythms, amazing melodic vocals & bombastic choirs we also brought in some new elements in form of various new sounds in the ‘’Serenity’’ universe and a constant implementation of female vocals supporting outstanding singer Georg Neuhauser."

War of Ages was released on 22 March 2013 in Europe and in April across North America and Asia, via Napalm Records. The album contains 10 songs with 2 additional songs on the Limited Edition Version. The album also continues the historical concept with songs about Beethoven, Napoleon, among others.

A music video was shot for the lead off single "Wings of Madness" and released on 28 March 2013. The music video shows Clémentine in the role of Elizabeth Bathory, as portrayed in the legend, and lead vocalist Georg Neuhauser as her husband, who is off at war. "Wings of Madness" is War of Ages only single up to this point.

Georg and Serenity began their The War of Ages Over Europe tour across the nations of Europe with various acts, including Visions of Atlantis, Souldrinker, Beyond the Bridge, Midriff. The band later announced that they would be joining Within Temptation on a small tour in March, stating "Serenity is going to support Within Temptation in Bratislava on March 12th and in Vienna (Gasometer) on March 15th!" Other tour stops will be Mons, Budapest, and the Masters of Rock in the Czech Republic.

=== Other projects and guest appearances ===
Georg once again used his talents and appeared as a guest vocalist on Delain's 2014 album "The Human Contradiction", which was released on 5 April 2014 in Europe, and on 8 April 2014 in North America, as well as Edgedown's debut album "Statues Fall." Edgedown's album debuted in April 2014.

In 2018, Neuhauser formed a new band Warkings with members of Souldrinker and Watch Me Bleed, all of whom use stage names such as "The Tribune" (Neuhauser), "The Crusader" (guitarist Markus Pohl), "The Viking" (bassist Christian Rodens), and "The Spartan" (drummer Steffen Theurer). The band has since released five albums, the last two of which also include vocalist Secil Sen (Morgana le Fay).

== Personal life ==
Besides his musical career Neuhauser is working as a Historian for Medieval and Early Modern Times at the University of Innsbruck. His official academic title is "Mag.phil. Mag.rer.nat. Dr. phil." His research interests include economic history, war history as well as mining history.

== Discography ==
=== Serenity releases ===
- Engraved Within (2005)
- Words Untold & Dreams Unlived (2007)
- Fallen Sanctuary (2008)
- Death & Legacy (2011)
- War of Ages (2013)
- Codex Atlanticus (2016)
- Lionheart (2017)
- The Last Knight (2020)
- Nemesis AD (2023)

=== Warkings ===
- Reborn (2018)
- Revenge (2020)
- Revolution (2021)
- Morgana (2022)
- Armageddon (2025)

=== Guest Appearance Releases ===
- Fairyland - Score to a New Beginning (2009) in tracks 2, 3, 5, 9, 10
- Delain - The Human Contradiction (2014) in track 9, The Tragedy of the Commons
- Edgedown – Statues Fall (2014) in track 7
- Phantasma – The Deviant Hearts (2015)
- Enemy Inside – Phoenix (2018) in 'Doorway to Salvation'
- Desert - Fortune Favors the Brave (2019)
- Dragony - A.E.I.O.U. (2021)

=== Fallen Sanctuary ===
- Terranova (2022)
