= Revolution (disambiguation) =

A revolution is a drastic political or social change that usually occurs relatively quickly.

Revolution may also refer to:

== Aviation ==
- Warner Revolution I, an American homebuilt aircraft design
- Warner Revolution II, an American homebuilt aircraft design

== Books ==
- Revolution (Brand book), by Russell Brand, 2014
- Revolution (novel), by Jennifer Donnelly, 2010
- Revolution, the first part of the 2013 novelization of the first book of the animated TV series The Legend of Korra
- The Revolution: A Manifesto, by Ron Paul, 2008
- Revolution: A Sociological Interpretation, by Michael Kimmel, 1990

== Comics ==
- Revolution (Marvel Comics), 2000
- Revolution (IDW Publishing), 2016
- Révolution (comic), a series of comic books about the events of the French Revolution

== Computing ==
- Revolution (software platform), a development environment based on the MetaCard engine
- Revolution Analytics, a statistical software company
- Revolution, the former name of LiveCode, a software platform and cross-platform software development environment featuring a dynamically typed programming language known as Transcript
- Runtime Revolution (RunRev), the former name of LiveCode, Ltd., the software company that develops the LiveCode software platform
- Revolution, prototype name for the Wii video game console produced by Nintendo
- Revolution Software, an English videogame company
- Revolution (video game), 1986 computer game released by U.S. Gold

== Engineering and science ==
- Scientific Revolution, a 16th–17th century period from which origins of modern science and the scientific method emerged
- Industrial Revolution, an 18th–19th-century period of rapid technological development in the West
- Second Industrial Revolution, also known as the Technological Revolution
- Revolution engine, a Harley–Davidson engine
- Revolution (angular unit), a unit of angle
- Revolution (rotational unit), a unit of number of rotations
  - Revolutions per minute (RPM), a unit of rotational frequency

== Film ==
- Revolution, a 1967 eight-minute short by Peter Greenaway
- Revolution (1968 film), a documentary by Jack O'Connell made in San Francisco
- Révolution, a 1985 French adult film directed by José Bénazéraf
- Revolution (1985 film), a film about a New York fur trapper during the American Revolutionary War
- Revolution!! (1989), a comic re-enactment of the French Revolution by the National Theatre of Brent
- Revolution (2012 film), a documentary about taking a stand against environmental degradation
- RevoLOUtion: The Transformation of Lou Benedetti a 2006 dramedy about a Brooklyn boxer
- Revolution OS (2001), a 2001 documentary on Linux and the free software movement
- Revolution Studios, a film production company
- Revolution (2023 film)

== Television ==
- "Revolution" (Law & Order: Criminal Intent), the Law & Order: Criminal Intent eighth-season finale based on a banking revolution
- The Revolution (miniseries), a 2006 American documentary miniseries about the American Revolution that was broadcast on History Channel
- The Revolution (TV program), a 2012 American health and lifestyle talk television program that aired on ABC
- Revolution (TV series), an American science fiction series that ran from 2012 to 2014
- Revolucija (TV series), a Serbian television series that ran from 2013 to 2015
- Supermodel Me: Revolution, the sixth season of Supermodel Me

== Mathematics ==
- Surface of revolution
- Revolution (geometry), a complete rotation
  - Orbital revolution, the cyclical path taken by one object around another object, as of planets

== Medicine ==
- Selamectin, a parasiticide and anthelminthic for cats and dogs, with the trade name Revolution

== Music ==
=== Albums ===
- Revolution (All Star United album), and the title song
- Revolution (Paula Cole album)
- Revolution (Chumbawamba EP)
- Revolution (Crematory album), and the title song
- Revolution (The Dubliners album)
- Revolution (Hypnogaja album)
- Revolution (Kara album)
- Revolution (Lacrimosa album), and the title song
- Revolution (Little Steven album), and the title song
- Revolution (Miranda Lambert album)
- Revolution (Sirsy album)
- Revolution (Sister Machine Gun album)
- Revolution (Slaughter album)
- Revolution (Tiësto album)
- Revolution (YFriday album), and the title song
- Revolution!, by Paul Revere & The Raiders
- REvolution, by Lynch Mob
- (r)Evolution, by HammerFall
- The Revolution (Belly album)
- The Revolution (Inhabited album)
- Revolution, by 2R
- Revolution, by Dilba
- Revolution, by Diplo, and the title song
- Revolution, by Diana Garnet, and the title song
- Revolution, by Wickeda
- (R)evolution, an album by Minimum Serious
- The Revolution, by Fiach Moriarty and Wallis Bird
- Revolution, an EP by Anew Revolution
- Revolution, an EP by One Minute Silence
- The Revolution (EP), by Van William, and the title song featuring First Aid Kit

=== Songs ===
- "Revolution" (Arrested Development song), 1992
- "Revolution" (Beatles song), 1968
- "Revolution" (Coldrain song), 2018
- "Revolution" (The Cult song), 1985
- "Revolution" (Jars of Clay song), 2002
- "Revolution" (Judas Priest song), 2005
- "Revolution" (Måns Zelmerlöw song), 2025
- "Revolution" (Nina Simone song), 1968
- "Revolution" (R3hab and Nervo and Ummet Ozcan song), 2013
- "Revolution" (Stefanie Heinzmann song), 2008
- "Revolution" (Tomorrow song), 1967
- "Revolution" (The Veronicas song), 2006
- "Revolution", by 30 Seconds to Mars, an unreleased song
- "Revolution", by Accept from Stalingrad
- "Revolution", by Aimee Allen, used as the title music for the TV series Birds of Prey
- "Revolution", by Audio Adrenaline from Audio Adrenaline
- "Revolution", by Bang Camaro from Bang Camaro II
- "Revolution", by Bastille from Give Me the Future + Dreams of the Past
- "Revolution", by Bob Marley from Natty Dread
- "Revolution", by Built to Spill from Ultimate Alternative Wavers
- "Revolution", by Cathedral from Caravan Beyond Redemption
- "Revolution", by Dennis Brown
- "Revolution", by Doug Wimbish from CinemaSonics
- "Revolution", by Eric Clapton from Back Home
- "Revolution", by Flogging Molly from Speed of Darkness
- "Revolution", by Kirk Franklin from The Nu Nation Project
- "Revolution", by Krayzie Bone, featuring The Marley Brothers, from Thug Mentality 1999
- "Revolution", by Lil' Kim from The Notorious K.I.M.
- "Revolution", by Livin Out Loud from Then and Now
- "Revolution", by Moth from Immune to Gravity
- "Revolution", by Pain from I Am
- "Revolution", by P.O.D. from Payable on Death
- "Revolution", by Primal Fear from Black Sun
- "Revolution", by Public Enemy from New Whirl Odor
- "Revolution", by R.E.M. from the soundtrack Batman & Robin and their documentary video Road Movie
- "Revolution", by Robbie Williams from Escapology
- "Revolution", by Rogue Traders from We Know What You're Up To
- "Revolution", by Spacemen 3 from Playing with Fire
- "Revolution", by Steve Angello from Wild Youth
- "Revolution", by Temperance from The Earth Embraces Us All
- "Revolution", by Theatre of Tragedy from Forever Is the World
- "Revolution (B-Boy Anthem)", by Zion I
- "Revolution (In the Summertime?)", by Cosmic Rough Riders
- "Revolution 9", by The Beatles
- "Revolution 909", by Daft Punk
- "Revolution 1993", by Jamiroquai from Emergency on Planet Earth
- "Revolution Song", by Oasis, a demo recorded during the sessions for Standing on the Shoulder of Giants
- "The Revolution" (Exile Tribe song)
- "The Revolution", by Attack Attack! from This Means War
- "The Revolution", by BT from the soundtrack Lara Croft: Tomb Raider
- "The Revolution", by Chris de Burgh from The Getaway
- "The Revolution", by Coolio from Gangsta's Paradise
- "The Revolution", by David Byrne from Look into the Eyeball
- "The Revolution", by Scooter from Back to the Heavyweight Jam
- "The Revolution", by Tom Verlaine from The Miller's Tale: A Tom Verlaine Anthology
- "La révolution", by Tryo from Mamagubida
- "(r)Evolution", by HammerFall from (r)Evolution

=== Other uses in music ===
- Revolution (duo), a South African house band
- The Revolution (band), Prince's original band, formed in 1979
- Revolution Records, a U.S. record label
- Ram Revolution, a Ram Truck Division fully-electric pickup truck

== Politics ==
- Revolution (political group), a political group founded by the League for a Fifth International
- Total revolution, the political philosophy of veganism and anarchism

== Publications ==
- Revolution (weekly), organ of the Revolutionary Communist Party, USA
- The Revolution (newspaper), a women's rights newspaper published from 1868 to 1872

== Society ==
- Social revolution, a sudden change in the structure and nature of society
- Revolution (Blackpool Pleasure Beach), a roller coaster at Blackpool Pleasure Beach, England
- The New Revolution (roller coaster), a roller coaster at Six Flags Magic Mountain formerly known as Revolution
- Vekoma Illusion, a roller coaster model named Revolution at Bobbejaanland in Belgium
- Revolution (vodka bar), a brand of bars founded in Manchester in 1996
- Revolution LLC, a principal investment firm founded by former AOL chairman Steve Case
- Revolution (pet medicine), a flea and heartworm preventative treatment for cats and dogs
- The Revolution (radio station), a former radio station broadcasting to Oldham, Rochdale and Tameside, UK

== Sport ==
- AEW Revolution, an annual professional wrestling event by All Elite Wrestling (AEW)
- New England Revolution, a Major League Soccer team
- Revolution, a ball rotation in ten-pin bowling
- Revolution, nickname of a United States men's national Australian rules football team
- Shropshire Revolution, American football team in Shropshire, England
- Revolution (cycling series), a track cycling event held at the Manchester Velodrome, England
- Various professional wrestling tag teams and stables:
  - The Revolution (TNA) in Total Nonstop Action Wrestling
  - The Revolution (WCW), in World Championship Wrestling
  - Revolution (puroresu) in various puroresu promotions

== Visual arts ==
- Alternative title for The Crowd, a painting by Wyndham Lewis

== See also ==
- List of revolutions and rebellions
- Our Revolution (disambiguation)
- Revolución (disambiguation)
- Revolutions (disambiguation)
- R-Evolution (disambiguation)
- Viva la revolución (disambiguation)
