= Revolutionary War =

Revolutionary War(s) may refer to:

- American Revolutionary War (1775–1783), the armed conflict between Great Britain and 13 of its North American colonies, which had declared themselves the independent United States of America
- French Revolutionary Wars, a series of military conflicts (1792–1802) resulting from the French Revolution
- Peninsular War, a Napoleonic war in Iberia
- Texas Revolution
- Philippine Revolution
- Russian Civil War, a war between the Soviet Red Army and the White movement and its allies
- Irish War of Independence, a guerrilla war between the Irish Republican Army and British security forces
- People's war, a military-political strategy developed by Mao Zedong
- Indonesian National Revolution
- Cuban Revolution, an armed revolt conducted by Fidel Castro's 26 July Movement against President Fulgencio Batista

Other types of conflicts that can be called "revolutionary wars" include:

- Liberation war, a conflict primarily intended to bring freedom or independence to a nation or group
- War of independence, a conflict occurring over a territory that has declared independence
- War of national liberation, conflicts fought by nationalities to gain independence
- Rebellion, a refusal of obedience or order

== See also ==
- List of revolutions and rebellions
- List of wars of independence
- Restoration War (disambiguation)
- Revolution (disambiguation)
- Revolutions (disambiguation)
- War (disambiguation)
