= Hermitage – Daruma's Eyes Pt 2 =

Studio album by Temperance
- Released: 20 October 2023
- Genres: Symphonic metal; power metal
- Length: 63:45
- Label: Napalm
- Producer: Marco Pastorino

Temperance chronology
Diamanti (2021)	Hermitage – Daruma's Eyes Pt 2 (2023)	Arcani (2026)

Singles from Hermitage – Daruma's Eyes Pt 2
- 1. "No Return" Released: 23 September 2023

Professional ratings
Review scores
Source	Rating
Metal-Roos	4.5/5
Powermetal.de	9.5/10

Hermitage – Daruma's Eyes Pt 2 is the seventh studio album by Italian power metal band Temperance. It was released via Napalm Records on 20 October 2023. It is the first album to feature singer Kristin Starkey, and the last one with drummer Alfonso Mocerino with his recordings finished before being leaving the band with Marco Sacchetto taking his place. It is the band's first full concept album, a sequel to the song "Daruma's Eyes (Part 1)" from their 2018 album Of Jupiter and Moons, with guest musicians including Arjen Anthony Lucassen of Ayreon, Fabienne Erni of Eluveitie and Illumishade, Laura Fella of Faun, and Alessandro Conti of Twilight Force. A lyric video was released for "No Return" on 21 September 2023.

== Track listing ==
Hermitage – Daruma's Eyes Pt 2 track listing
No.	Title	Length
1.	"Daruma"	4:23
2.	"Glorious"	4:11
3.	"A Hero Reborn"	5:50
4.	"Welcome to Hermitage"	3:53
5.	"No Return"	3:40
6.	"In Search of Gold"	4:43
7.	"Join Me"	3:56
8.	"Trust No One but You"	3:45
9.	"Darkness Is Just a Drawing"	4:35
10.	"Into the Void"	4:33
11.	"Brand New Start"	5:27
12.	"Where We Belong"	2:54
13.	"Full of Memories"	4:11
14.	"Cliff"	7:44
Total length:		63:45

== Personnel ==
Temperance

- Kristin Starkey – female clean vocals (as "Irin")
- Michele Guaitoli – male clean vocals (as "Viktor"), keyboards
- Marco Pastorino – guitars, harsh vocals (as "Anningan")
- Luca Negro – bass
- Alfonso Mocerino – drums (left band between recording and release)

Guest vocalists and characters

- Arjen Anthony Lucassen – "Narrator" (tracks 1, 7, 10, 11, 13, and 14)
- Fabienne Erni – "Anisha" (tracks 4 and 7)
- Laura Fella – "Dian" (tracks 4 and 7)
- Alessandro Conti – "Faramond" (tracks 8 and 14)
