= Temperance (band) =

Italian modern melodic power metal band

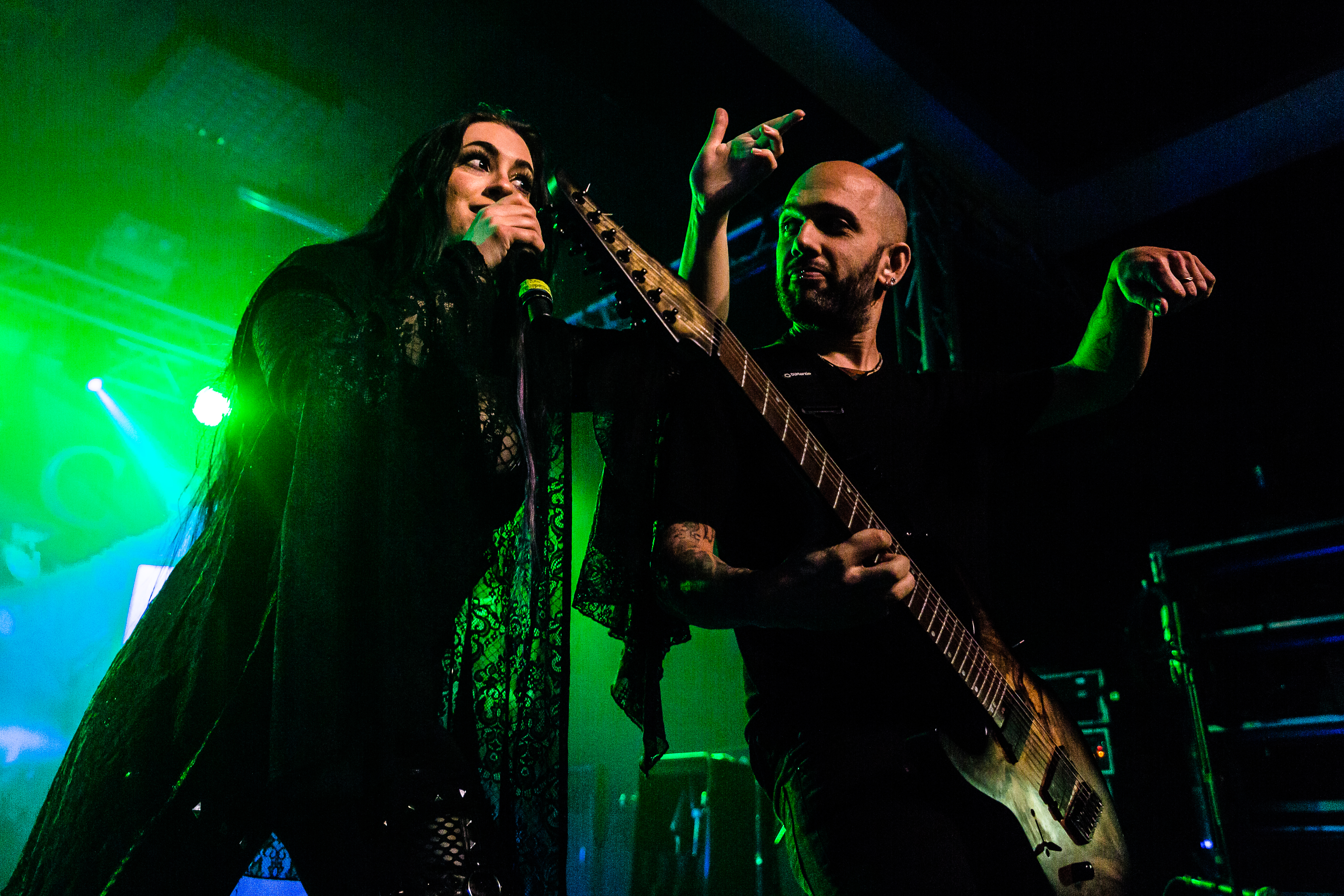
- The band in 2024

Background information
- Origin: Italy
- Genres: Power metal; symphonic metal
- Years active: 2013–present
- Label: Napalm Records
- Members: Marco Pastorino; Luca Negro; Michele Guaitoli; Kristin Starkey; Marco Sacchetto
- Past members: Sandro Capone; Chiara Tricarico; Giulio Capone; Alfonso Mocerino; Alessia Scolletti
- Website: www.temperanceband.com

Temperance is an Italian power metal band. The band blends heavy guitars, metal riffs, electronic tracks and elements of folk music into melodic and powerful music. So far, they have released seven full-length albums and a live DVD, released through Scarlet Records and Napalm Records, with an eighth album released in 2026.

== History ==
Founded in 2013 by members of Secret Sphere and defunct progressive power metal band Bejelit, drummer Giulio Capone, guitarists/vocalists Sandro Capone and Marco Pastorino, and bassist Luca Negro formed a new band named Temperance and hired female vocalist Chiara Tricarico. The band released their first two albums Temperance (2014) and Limitless (2015). A lyric video was made for "Me, Myself & I", followed by a music video for "Save Me".

Their third album, The Earth Embraces Us All, was released on 16 September 2016. After Sandro Capone left before recording, Marco Pastorino took over on clean vocals temporarily. The album has received positive feedback. Giulio Capone left the band the following year, and Chiara Tricarico would also part ways shortly after. They would both later form their own band, Moonlight Haze. On 6 March 2018, Italian singer Alessia Scolletti announced via Instagram that she had officially joined the band after being a touring member for a while. Scolletti's first album with the band, Of Jupiter and Moons was released on 20 April 2018.

After two more albums, on 27 January 2023, Temperance released a statement confirming the departures of Alfonso Mocerino and Alessia Scolletti. On 26 June 2023, Temperance announced that Kristin Starkey, as the new singer, and Marco Sacchetto, as the new drummer, have joined the band. The band's seventh album, Hermitage – Daruma's Eyes Pt 2, released on 20 October 2023, is the band's first full concept album, a sequel to the song "Daruma's Eyes (Part 1)" from their 2018 album Of Jupiter and Moons, with guest musicians including Arjen Anthony Lucassen of Ayreon, Fabienne Erni of Eluveitie and Illumishade, Laura Fella of Faun, and Alessandro Conti of Twilight Force. A lyric video was released for "No Return" on 21 September 2023.

The band will release their eighth album, Arcani, on 16 October 2026.

== Band members ==
Current

- Marco Pastorino – lead guitar, clean/harsh male vocals (2013–present)
- Luca Negro – bass (2013–present)
- Michele Guaitoli – clean male vocals, keyboards (2018–present)
- Kristin Starkey – clean female vocals (2023–present)
- Marco Sacchetto – drums (2023–present)

Former

- Sandro Capone – clean male vocals, rhythm guitar (2013–2016)
- Chiara Tricarico – clean female vocals (2013–2017)
- Giulio Capone – drums, keyboards (2013–2017)
- Alfonso Mocerino – drums (2017–2023)
- Alessia Scolletti – clean female vocals (2018–2023)

== Discography ==
Studio albums

- 2014: Temperance
- 2015: Limitless
- 2016: The Earth Embraces Us All
- 2018: Of Jupiter and Moons
- 2020: Viridian
- 2021: Diamanti
- 2023: Hermitage – Daruma's Eyes Pt 2
- 2026: Arcani

Live Albums/DVD

- 2017: Maschere - A Night at the Theater
- 2025: From Hermitage to Europe

Singles & EPs

- 2015: Me, Myself & I (single)
- 2017: At the Edge of Space (Live) (single)
- 2018: Of Jupiter and Moons (single)
- 2018: Broken Promises (single)
- 2019: Lost in the Christmas Dream (single)
- 2020: My Demons Can't Sleep (Single)
- 2021: Melodies of Green and Blue (EP)
- 2021: Pure Life Unfolds (Single)
- 2021: Diamanti (Single)
- 2023: Daruma (single)
- 2023: No Return (single)
- 2023: Darkness Is Just a Drawing (single)
- 2026: The Devil: Sin, Sin, Sin (single)

== Videography ==
- 2014 Breathe
- 2015 Save Me
- 2016 A Thousand Places
- 2016 Unspoken Words
- 2018 The Last Hope In A World Of Hopes
- 2018 Of Jupiter and Moons
- 2020 Start Another Round
- 2020 My Demons Can't Sleep
- 2021 Pure Life Unfolds
- 2021 Breaking the Rules of Heavy Metal
- 2021 Diamanti
- 2023: Daruma
- 2023: Darkness Is Just A Drawing
