= When You Come Around =

When You Come Around may refer to:

- "When You Come Around" (Cosmic Rough Riders song)
- "When You Come Around" (Deric Ruttan song)

== See also ==
- "When I Come Around", a song by Green Day
