= Viridian (disambiguation) =

Viridian may refer to:

- Viridian, a blue-green pigment
- The Viridian design movement
- Viridian, the codename for Microsoft's Hyper-V hypervisor
- Viridian Group, a Northern Ireland-based energy business
- Viridian (The Greencards album), 2007
- Viridian (Temperance album), 2020
- "Viridian," a song by Between the Buried and Me on their 2007 album Colors
- Captain Viridian, one of the main characters of the video game VVVVVV
- Viridian Elementary School, an elementary school in Arlington, Texas
- Prince Viridian, a character in the book The Letter for the King
