= Truth Decay =

Truth Decay may refer to:

- Truth Decay (T Bone Burnett album), 1980
- Truth Decay (Hypnogaja album), 2009
- Truth Decay (You Me at Six album), 2023
- Truth Decay (book), a 2018 non-fiction book
