= Hyperborea (metal band) =

Bulgarian death metal musical group

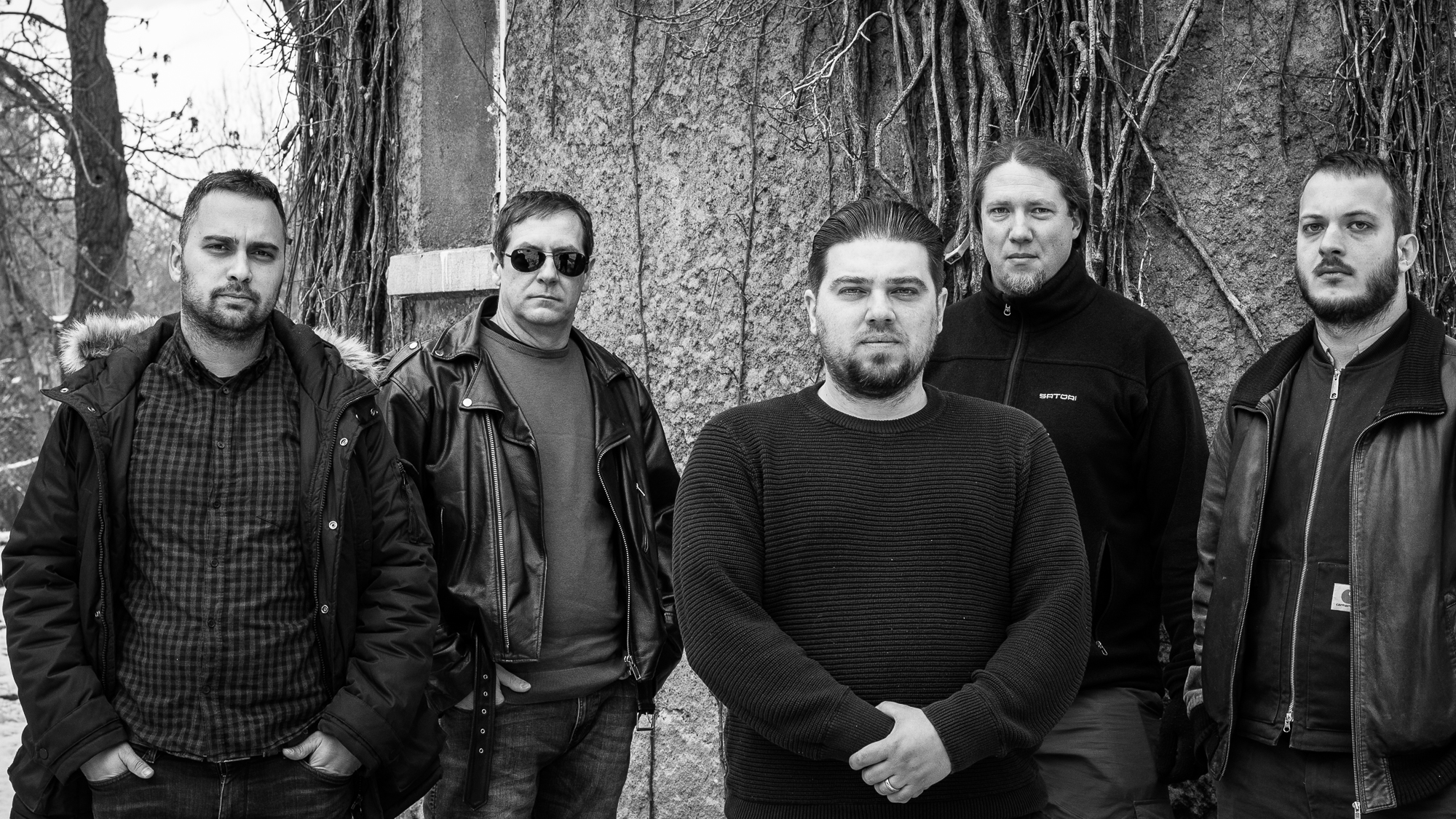
- Hyperborea Hyperborea

Background information
- Origin: Sofia, Bulgaria
- Genres: Death metal; Technical death metal; Thrash metal; Deathrash
- Years active: 1997–present
- Labels: Art Gates Records; Counter Attack Productions; Butchery Music
- Members: Dancho Ivanov; Yordan Kanchev; Andrey Andronov; Vladimir Ivanov; Antonis Trochopoulos
- Past members: Kiril Kirilov; Krum Doynov; Nikolai Kandev; Plamen Petkov; Dinko Dimov; Ivaylo Baev; Alexander Georgiev; Zhivko Kyossev

Hyperborea is a metal band from Sofia, Bulgaria, found in 1997. Their style is a mixture between death and thrash metal, while the band has continually evolved from oldschool to more technical sounding. The band has played on numerous concerts in Bulgaria for more than 20 years. They have supported many death metal bands at their gigs in Bulgaria, such as Obituary, Arch Enemy, Asphyx, Cancer, Angel Witch, Vader, Crematory, Pungent Stench.

== History ==
The band was found in 1997 in Sofia by several friends with the intention to play Florida-style death metal. During that time there were not so many clubs and metal bars to play in, so Hyperborea and the other representatives of the Bulgarian extreme metal scene gathered in community halls and organized underground concerts. As a result, between 1998 – 2004 Hyperborea played in numerous underground events in Sofia and other big cities in the country, together with Bulgarian bands such as Korozy, Samhain, Demonizm, Necromancer, Enthrallment, and others.

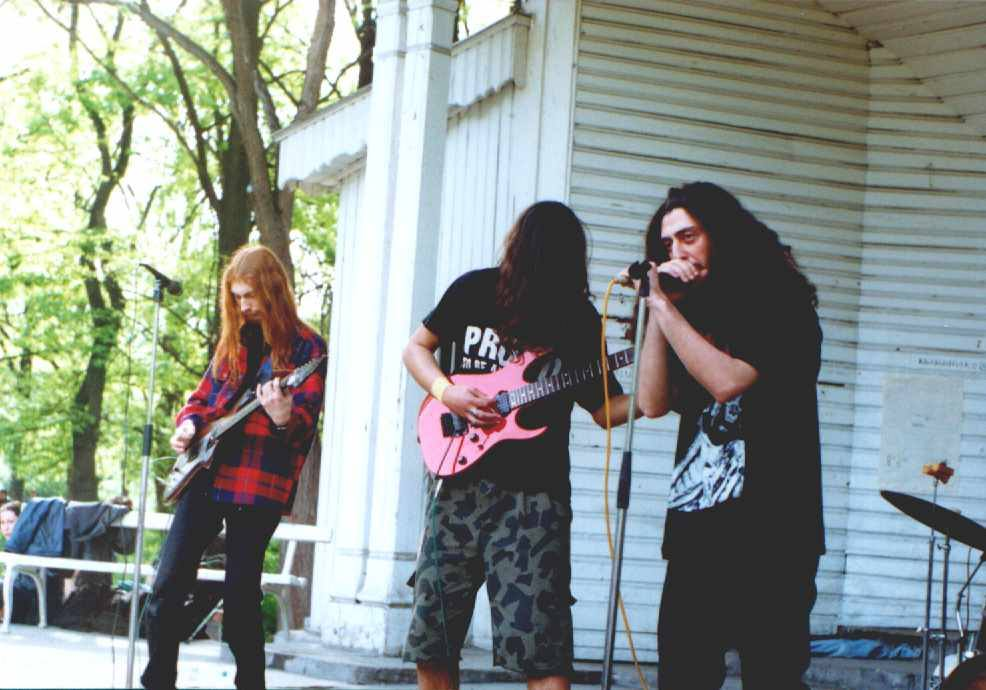
Hyperborea live in Borisova Gradina (Sofia, Bulgaria) in 1999.

In 2001 Hyperborea released their first demo, called “Catharsis”. In 2003 they entered in "Graffitti Studio" and "M&D Studio" for their debut album “Architecture of Mind”, which came out by the label “Butchery Music” in 2004. The band promoted the album in Bulgaria and also in “Club A” in Bucharest, Romania.

During the period 2004 – 2007 Hyperborea prepared the material for their second studio album “Cryogenic Somnia”, while not abandoning their concert activity. They opened for several extreme metal bands, such as Obituary, Vader, and Pungent Stench, mainly with another Bulgarian extreme band - Past Redemption.

In 2007 their second album “Cryogenic Somnia” was recorded in "Graffitti Studio" and was released by “Counter Attack Productions”. It was ranked album of the year by the readers of the leading local metal magazine “Pro-Rock” and also given high credit by numerous foreign media. The band opened for Crematory in 2008 and took part in the first edition of the Romanian festival Ost Mountain Fest in 2010 (Busteni, Romania).

In the following years, Hyperborea sporadically participated in different concerts and festivals in Bulgaria and Greece. They opened for Arch Enemy (2014), Cancer, Angel Witch (2015) and Asphyx (2016).

In 2017 Hyperborea signed a deal with the Spanish label "Art Gates Records" for the worldwide release and distribution of a third studio album. In the beginning of 2019 they entered into "Renewsound Studio" to record the material they had created in the previous years. On 4 October 2019 Hyperborea released their first single off the upcoming album with lyric video - "Silent Stream". On 8 November they presented a video for the second single - "From Within". Their third studio album is called “Umbra” and was officially released on 15 November 2019 via "Art Gates Records".

Hyperborea were among the originators of the idea to make annual “Tribute to Chuck Schuldiner” concerts in Bulgaria, which are being held until nowadays every year to commemorate the passing of the legendary musician Chuck Schuldiner. Hyperborea and Grupa X organized the first Tribute to Chuck Schuldiner in Sofia on 21.12.2001, just a week after Chuck’s death. Hyperborea also participated in several “Tribute to Chuck Schuldiner” concerts in the following years.

== Members ==
There were numerous line-up changes in Hyperborea throughout their active years.

=== Current members ===
- Dancho Ivanov – vocals (2016–present)
- Yordan Kanchev – guitars (1998–present)
- Andrey Andronov – guitars (2004–present)
- Vladimir Ivanov – bass (2003-2011, 2014–present)
- Antonis Trochopoulos – drums (2013–present)

=== Past members ===
- Kiril Kirilov – vocals (1997-2016)
- Krum Doynov – guitars (1997-2004)
- Nikolai Kandev – guitars (2008)
- Plamen Petkov – bass (1997-2002)
- Dinko Dimov – bass (2011-2014)
- Ivaylo Baev – drums (1997-1999)
- Alexander Georgiev – drums (1999-2002, 2008)
- Zhivko Kyossev – drums (2002-2012)

== Discography ==
- Catharsis (demo) (2001)
- Architecture of Mind (2004)
- Cryogenic Somnia (2007)
- Umbra (2019)

=== Compilation appearances ===
- Murder Sound Extreme Compilation (2013) - V.A. (1 song: "The Advancing Shadow")
- Death Metal Bulgarian Fans Vol.2 (2015) - V.A. (1 song: "Cryogenic Somnia")
