= Arcani (album) =

Studio album by Temperance
- Released: 16 October 2026
- Genres: Symphonic metal; power metal
- Length: 55:15
- Label: Napalm
- Producer: Marco Pastorino

Temperance chronology
Hermitage – Daruma's Eyes Pt 2 (2023)	Arcani (2026)

Singles from Arcani
- 1. "The Devil: Sin, Sin, Sin" Released: 2 July 2026; 2. "Death: Right Before We Die" Released: 7 August 2026; 3. "The Tower: Lean into Fear" Released: 10 September 2026; 4. "The Fool" Released: 16 October 2026

Professional ratings
Review scores
Source	Rating
The Dark Melody	8/10
My Global Mind	9/10
Sonic Perspectives	8.9/10

Arcani is the eighth studio album by Italian power metal band Temperance. It was released via Napalm Records on 16 October 2026. It is the first album with drummer Marco Sacchetto. The songs of the album are all named after the Major Arcana deck in the Tarot card game. Music videos were released for some songs including "The Devil: Sin, Sin, Sin", "The Tower: Lean into Fear", and "The Fool".

== Track listing ==
Arcani track listing
No.	Title	Length
1.	"The Fool"	5:23
2.	"The Magician: Into the Fire"	3:28
3.	"Death: Right Before We Die"	4:15
4.	"The Tower: Lean into Fear"	3:21
5.	"The Devil: Sin, Sin, Sin"	3:40
6.	"Temperance: Forgiveness"	4:26
7.	"The Chariot: Alla ricerca dell'America"	4:45
8.	"Justice: Shame & Glory"	3:44
9.	"The Star: Surrender Control"	4:33
10.	"Wheel of Fortune: Come and Call Me"	3:58
11.	"The Moon: The Man of Moonlight"	4:17
12.	"The Hanged Man: Petrichor"	6:41
13.	"The World"	2:44
Total length:		55:15

== Personnel ==
Temperance

- Kristin Starkey – female clean vocals
- Michele Guaitoli – male clean vocals, keyboards
- Marco Pastorino – guitars, harsh vocals
- Luca Negro – bass
- Marco Sacchetto – drums
