= Inquilaab =

Inquilaab is a word of Persian origin, meaning "revolution, change, turn, or uprising (often used as a political slogan).

Inquilaab may refer to:

- Inquilab Zindabad, phrase meaning "Long live the revolution", used during the Indian independence movement
- Inqulab Zindabbad, a 1971 Indian film
- Inquilaab (album), an album by Junoon
- Inquilaab (1984 film), a 1984 Indian Hindi-language action-drama film by T. Rama Rao, starring Amitabh Bachchan
- Inquilaab (2002 film), a 2002 Indian Bengali-language film
- Inqilab, 2008 Indian documentary film by Gauhar Raza about Indian revolutionary Bhagat Singh
- Inquilaab Srivastava, the birth name of Indian actor Amitabh Bachchan
- Daily Inqilab, Bangladeshi newspaper

== See also ==
- Viva la revolución (disambiguation)
- Intifada
