= Hypnogaja =

American rock band

- Origin: Los Angeles, California, USA
- Genres: Alternative rock, crossover, space rock, hard rock, trip hop (early)
- Years active: 2000-Present
- Labels: Snafu Records, The Spaceman Agency, Union State Records, Access Denied Recordings, Sony Music (Germany), Symbiotic Entertainment, Drama! Music/PARAS Group (Ryko/Universal)
- Members: ShyBoy (Jason Arnold); Jeeve; Mark Nubar
- Website: www.hypnogaja.com

Hypnogaja (pronounced hip-nō-gä-zhä) is an American rock band founded by vocalist Jason Arnold (known professionally as ShyBoy) and keyboardist Mark Nubar in 2000.

The band has written music for a number of media projects, including: Sex And The City; Warehouse 13; FlatOut: Ultimate Carnage; Tap Tap Revenge; Roswell; The Looking Glass Wars; Valentine; Cold Creek Manor; and the Scream 4 trailer.

== History ==
=== Early years (2000–2002) ===
Hypnogaja originated as an electronic studio project. Soon after independently releasing their debut album Revolution, the group signed with Los Angeles-based music publisher PEN Music Group and began to write music for a number of TV shows, and video games. Some of their first features were in projects by filmmaker Zalman King. In 2002, the band began to develop a rock sound as they incorporate guitars and acoustic drums following therelease of their EP Post-Hypnotic Stress Disorder.

=== Kill Switch (2003–2004) ===
Hypnogaja developed merchandise for their band in the pilot episode of Dead Like Me. The band released the Kill Switch EP in August of that year, following the lead single and video "Nothing Box." Hypnogaja went on their first U.S. tour in 2004 and opened for artists such as 311, Linda Perry, Shinedown, and Saliva.

=== Below Sunset and The Looking Glass Wars (2005–2007) ===
In 2005, Hypnogaja released the critically acclaimed LP Below Sunset, which received a number of positive reviews by publications. The album contains Hypnogaja's widely popular cover of Eurythmics' "Here Comes the Rain Again" and "Looking Glass." Hypnogaja followed with the release of the live album Acoustic Sunset: Live At The Longhouse, produced by Wendy Waldman, who co-wrote the album's new studio track "I'm Not One Of You."

=== Truth Decay and South by Southwest (2008–2011) ===
Truth Decay, a science-fiction tinged concept album, was released in 2009 and received a 9 out-of-10-star rating from Outburn magazine, which noted it as an "expertly crafted album." The album's first single, "The March," spawned a music video directed by Nelson Cragg. During their album tour, Hypnogaja appeared on the debut episode of Stripped Down Live, hosted by Tears For Fears' Curt Smith. The band made several more appearances at events such as South by Southwest. The group won two awards at the Hollywood Music in Media Awards, Best Alternative Artist and one for Best Male Vocal for ShyBoy's performance "On the Radio."

In February 2011, Hypnogaja released a remix of the Truth Decay song "Dark Star" (featuring Slimkid3 of The Pharcyde). The accompanying music video features an appearance by Slimkid3 and dancers from America's Best Dance Crew, including choreographer Yuri Tag and Cindy Minowa of Kabba Modern and Geo Lee of Instant Noodles.

=== 2020-present ===
In February 2020, Hypnogaja released the single "Lovesick," the band's first release since the 2011 single "Dark Star" (featuring SlimKid3). In July 2022, the band released the single "Circle of Hate" via The Spaceman Agency label. In 2025, Hypnogaja returned with a series of new singles on Snafu Records, beginning with "Dead of Winter" in February, followed by "Escalate" in May, and "Open/Wide" in June.

=== ShyBoy Solo Work ===
ShyBoy and Mark Nubar founded L.A.-based indie label The Spaceman Agency in 2012. Since that time, they've released numerous recordings by ShyBoy, including the song "Backroom," which the pair co-wrote and co-produced with Jeff Hoeppner. The track's official music video was premiered by World of Wonder.

ShyBoy was named Best Solo Artist in the 10th Annual LA Weekly Best of L.A. Readers' Choice Awards and has performed throughout North America and in Europe, sharing the stage with artists such as Flo Rida, Meiko, and Amanda Palmer. His music has been featured in RuPaul’s Drag Race, America’s Next Top Model, the Capcom video game Devil May Cry 4, and the trailer for Halloween. An array of writers and artists have collaborated with ShyBoy, including: RuPaul, Wendy Waldman, Bryan Fuller, Darude; and Allee Willis.

== Discography ==
=== Studio albums ===
- 2026: My Dreams Have Teeth
- 2009: Truth Decay
- 2005: Below Sunset
- 2003: Kill Switch EP
- 2002: Post-Hypnotic Stress Disorder
- 1999: Revolution
- 1997: Lust

=== Compilations & Other ===
- 2007: Audio From Last Night's Dream
- 2007: Mixtape
- 2006: Acoustic Sunset: Live At The Longhouse (produced by Wendy Waldman)
- 2003: Bridge To Nowhere (released in Germany by Sony Music)
- 2004: White Label, Vol. 1

=== EPs & Singles ===
- 2025: This Isn't Going to End Well...
- 2025: Things That Go Bump in the Night
- 2025: I Need a Moment
- 2025: Open / Wide
- 2025: Escalate
- 2025: Dead of Winter
- 2022: Circle of Hate
- 2020: Lovesick
- 2011: Dark Star
- 2010: Welcome To The Future / On The Radio [Digital 45]
- 2009: Worship Me (I'm On TV)
- 2009: Apocalyptic Love Song
- 2009: I Can See Into Forever (Sammy Allen feat. Hypnogaja)
- 2008: The March
- 2001: Hypnogaja

=== Soundtracks & scores ===
- 2007: Devil May Cry 4 (Special Soundtrack)
- 2002: Carrie (Music from the NBC Movie Event)
- 2000: The Young Unknowns (Music from the Moution Picture)

=== Videos ===
- Dark Star (featuring Slimkid3 of The Pharcyde) [directed by Chil Kong and choreographed by Yuri Tag of Kabba Modern]
- Welcome To The Future (directed by Graham Baclagon)
- Things Will Never Be The Same (directed by Kevin Heard)
- Apocalyptic Love Song (Live Acoustic Version) (directed by Paul Kulak)
- The March (directed by Nelson Cragg and Marius Markevicius)
- Quiet (directed by Ron Najor)
- Silver Star (directed by Graham Baclagon)
- Misery (directed by Graham Baclagon)
- They Don't Care (directed by Ron Najor)
- The Spaceman (Live Acoustic Version) (directed by Paul Kulak)
- Home (directed by Kristina Sky and Hypnogaja)
- Nothing Box (directed by Robert E. Blackmon)

=== ShyBoy ===
- ShyBoy Discography

== Band members ==
=== Current ===
- ShyBoy (Jason Arnold) – lead vocals (1999–present)
- Mark Nubar – keyboards (1999–present)
- Jeeve – guitar, bass, keyboards (2000–present)

=== Former ===
- Bryan Farrar – bass (2009–2011)
- Abraham Parker – guitar (2009–2011)
- Adrian Barnardo – drums (2004–2011)
- Leif Bunting – bass (2000–2004)
- Tim Groeschel – guitar, drums (2000–2008)
- Sandy Brown – vocals (1999–2002)
- Dr. Brooks – keyboards (1999–2000)

=== Session and live musicians ===
- Matt McJunkins – Bass (2008–2009)
- Bill Brennenstuhl – Drums (2003–2004)
- Daniel Wills – Bass (2003)
