= Enjoy the Melodic Sunshine =

Compilation album by Cosmic Rough Riders
- Released: November 2000
- Recorded: 1998–2000
- Genre: Alternative rock
- Length: 41:15
- Label: Poptones
- Producer: Daniel Wylie, Stephen Flemming

Cosmic Rough Riders chronology
Panorama (2000)	Enjoy the Melodic Sunshine (2000)	Pure Escapism (2002)

Professional ratings
Review scores
Source	Rating
AllMusic	4/5 stars

Enjoy the Melodic Sunshine is a collection of songs by Cosmic Rough Riders, featuring tracks from their first two self-financed albums as well as three new tracks. The album was put together by Alan McGee's Poptones label as a starting point for mainstream listeners (as they would later do for the Hives with Your New Favourite Band). The album spawned four singles including the UK top 40 hits "Revolution (In the Summertime?)" and "The Pain Inside".

== History ==
Most of the tracks on the album were recorded by Wylie and Fleming in a community funded recording studio in Glasgow's Castlemilk housing scheme and released on two self-financed albums; Deliverance (1999) and Panorama (2000). These albums were critically well received and sold out their initial pressings but the limited distribution and lack of promotion meant they did not cross over to a wide audience. On hearing Panorama, Alan McGee signed the band to a one-album deal. The album would take the best of the first two albums as well as some new tracks.

== Singles and chart performance ==
Although never reaching the UK Top 50, the album spent 17 weeks in the top 200 in 2001, peaking at No. 82. Steady sales meant that by the end of 2001, the album had achieved silver status (sales of 60,000) in the UK and it was named by Q magazine as one of the 50 best albums of the year. It would go on to achieve sales of over 100,000.

Four singles were released on Poptones in 2001 starting with "Melanie" in February (UK No. 111) and "Baby, You're So Free" in April (UK No. 76). Their next single, "Revolution (In the Summertime?)" released in July, became their first top 40 hit, reaching No. 35 and gave them their debut on BBC Television's Top of the Pops. The final single "The Pain Inside" also broke the top 40, reaching No. 36 in September.

== Critical reception ==
Q listed Enjoy the Melodic Sunshine as one of the best 50 albums of 2001.

== Track listing ==
The album is mostly made up with ten of the fourteen tracks from Panorama with two tracks from Deliverance ("Glastonbury Revisited" and "Emily Darling") and three new tracks ("Sometime", "Morning Sun" and "Baby, You're So Free" - itself a reworked version of Deliverance track "Baby").

1. "Brothers Gather Round" – 1:12
2. "The Gun Isn't Loaded" – 2:51
3. "Glastonbury Revisited" – 2:46
4. "Baby, You're So Free" – 3:45
5. "Value of Life" – 2:38
6. "Revolution (In the Summertime?)" – 3:20
7. "Have You Heard the News Today?" – 2:51
8. "Sometime" – 3:31
9. "Melanie" – 3:23
10. "The Pain Inside" – 3:22
11. "The Charm" – 2:03
12. "The Loser" – 2:24
13. "You've Got Me" – 3:10
14. "Emily Darling" – 2:47
15. "Morning Sun" – 0:56

== Charts ==
Chart performance for Enjoy the Melodic Sunshine
Chart (2001)	Peak position
UK Albums (OCC)	82
