= Our Revolution (disambiguation) =

Our Revolution is a political organization in the United States.

Our Revolution may also refer to:

- Our Revolution (Sanders book), a book by Bernie Sanders published in 2016
- Our Revolution (Trotsky book), a book by Leon Trotsky published in 1906

== See also ==
- Revolution (disambiguation)
