= Diamanti (Temperance album) =

Studio album by Temperance
- Released: 19 November 2021
- Genres: Power metal; symphonic metal
- Length: 58:06
- Label: Napalm

Temperance chronology
Viridian (2020)	Diamanti (2021)	Hermitage – Daruma's Eyes Pt 2 (2023)

Singles from Diamanti
- 1. "Breaking the Rules of Heavy Metal" Released: 13 October 2021; 2. "Diamanti" Released: 16 November 2021

Professional ratings
Review scores
Source	Rating
The Dark Melody	9/10
Sonic Perspectives	8.5/10

Diamanti is the sixth studio album by Italian power metal band Temperance. It is the last album to feature singer Alessia Scolletti and drummer Alfonso Mocerino as a full-time member. It was released via Napalm Records on 19 November 2021. A music video was released for "Breaking the Rules of Heavy Metal". The band's biggest influences for the album have been noted to be songs by Avantasia, Nightwish, and Amaranthe.

== Track listing ==
Diamanti track listing
No.	Title	Length
1.	"Pure Life Unfolds"	5:05
2.	"Breaking the Rules of Heavy Metal"	4:42
3.	"Diamanti"	4:31
4.	"Black is My Heart"	4:05
5.	"Litany of the Northern Lights"	3:33
6.	"You Only Live Once"	4:56
7.	"I the Loneliness"	4:22
8.	"Codebreaker"	4:49
9.	"The Night Before the End"	7:08
10.	"Fairy Tales for the Stars"	4:27
11.	"Let's Get Started"	4:12
12.	"Follow Me"	6:11
Total length:		58:06

== Personnel ==
Temperance

- Alessia Scolletti – female clean vocals
- Michele Guaitoli – male clean vocals, keyboards
- Marco Pastorino – guitars, harsh vocals
- Luca Negro – bass
- Alfonso Mocerino – drums
