= Viva la revolución =

Viva la revolución (Spanish), or Vive la révolution (French), translated as "long live the revolution", refers primarily to:

- The French Revolution (1789–1799)
- The Cuban Revolution (1953–1959)

It may also refer to:

== Arts and media ==
=== Music ===
- Viva la Revolution (album), by Dragon Ash, or the title song, 1999
- Viva la Revolution, an album by Ruben Ramos & the Mexican Revolution, 2008
- Viva la Revolucion, an EP by Revolution Void, 1999
- "Viva la Revolution" (song), by the Adicts, 1982
- "Viva la Revolución", a song by Sunny Lax, 2011
- "Viva, Viva La Revolution!", a 1936 Spanish falangist song

=== Other media ===
- Tepepa, a 1968 film also released as Tepepa... Viva la Revolución
- Viva La Revolución!, an episode of Kid Nation
- Vive la Revolution a book by Mark Steel

== Other ==
- Vive la révolution (group), a French political group co-founded by Roland Castro

== See also ==
- Revolución (disambiguation)
- Inquilaab (disambiguation)
- Revolution
- Guerrillero Heroico
- Russian Revolution
- Spanish Revolution (disambiguation)
- Intifada
