= Temperance (album) =

Studio album by Temperance
- Released: 15 April 2014
- Genres: Power metal; symphonic metal
- Length: 59:00
- Label: Scarlet Records

Temperance chronology
Temperance (2014)	Limitless (2015)

Professional ratings
Review scores
Source	Rating
Eternal Terror	4/6
Femme Metal	88/100
Metal Temple	7/10
Sonic Cathedral	8.5/10
Stormbringer	3/5

Temperance is the debut studio album by Italian power metal band Temperance. It was released via Scarlet Records on 15 April 2014.

== Track listing ==
Temperance track listing
No.	Title	Length
1.	"Tell Me"	3:52
2.	"Hero"	4:31
3.	"Heavens Above"	5:27
4.	"Breathe"	4:30
5.	"To Be with You"	3:36
6.	"Scared & Alone"	5:47
7.	"The Fourth Season"	7:40
8.	"Relentlessly"	4:07
9.	"Deja Vu"	4:35
10.	"Stronger"	4:14
11.	"Lotus"	6:14
12.	"A Thousand Years" (Christina Perri cover; bonus track)	4:08
Total length:		59:00

== Personnel ==
Temperance

- Chiara Tricarico – clean vocals
- Sandro Capone – guitars, backing vocals, additional clean vocals
- Marco Pastorino – guitars, harsh vocals
- Luca Negro – bass
- Giulio Capone – drums, keyboards

Crew

- Simone Mularoni – mixing, mastering
- Gustavo Sazes – artwork
