= Limitless (Temperance album) =

Studio album by Temperance
- Released: 31 March 2015
- Genres: Power metal; symphonic metal
- Length: 56:00
- Label: Scarlet

Temperance chronology
Temperance (2014)	Limitless (2015)	The Earth Embraces Us All (2016)

Professional ratings
Review scores
Source	Rating
Eternal Terror	5/6
Femme Metal	85/100
Metal Temple	8/10
Sonic Cathedral	9.5/10
Stormbringer	4/5

Limitless is the second studio album by Italian power metal band Temperance. It was released via Scarlet Records on 31 March 2015. A lyric video was made for "Me, Myself & I", followed by a music video for "Save Me".

== Track listing ==
Limitless track listing
No.	Title	Length
1.	"Oblivion"	5:10
2.	"Amber & Fire"	4:20
3.	"Save Me"	3:50
4.	"Stay"	4:19
5.	"Mr. White"	4:59
6.	"Here & Now"	3:42
7.	"Omega Point"	4:55
8.	"Me, Myself & I"	3:36
9.	"Side by Side"	3:50
10.	"Goodbye"	3:47
11.	"Burning"	3:43
12.	"Get a Life"	4:06
13.	"Limitless"	5:35
Total length:		56:00

== Personnel ==
Temperance

- Chiara Tricarico – clean vocals
- Sandro Capone – guitars, backing vocals, additional clean vocals
- Marco Pastorino – guitars, harsh vocals
- Luca Negro – bass
- Giulio Capone – drums, keyboards

Guest/session

- Aymen Ksuori – additional harsh vocals

Crew

- Simone Mularoni – mixing, mastering
- Gustavo Sazes – artwork
