= Revolución =

Revolución, the Spanish word for revolution, may refer to:

== Art and entertainment ==
- ¿¡Revolución!?, a 2006 Canadian documentary about Hugo Chávez
- La Revolución (painting), by Fabián Cháirez
- La Revolucion (Knott's Berry Farm), a swinging pendulum ride in Calidornia
- Revolución, a Cuban newspaper merged into Granma
- Revolution (1933 film), a Mexican drama film

=== Music ===
- Revolución, a 1985 album by La Polla Records
- Revolución (WarCry album), a 2008 album by WarCry
- Revolución (The Dead Daisies album), a 2015 album by The Dead Daisies
- La Revolución, a 2009 album by Wisin & Yandel
  - La Revolución: Live, a 2010 live version album by Wisin & Yandel
- "Revolución" (song), a 1997 Enrique Iglesias song from his album Vivir
- "Revolución", a song by Amaral from their album Pájaros en la cabeza
- "Revolución", a song by Mexican Institute of Sound from his album Político

== Places ==
- Avenida Revolución, the main tourist street in Tijuana, Mexico
- Estadio Revolución, a sports arena in Coahuila, Mexico
- Revolución metro station (Guadalajara), Jalisco, Mexico
- Revolución metro station (Mexico City), Mexico
- Revolución (Mexico City Metrobús), a BRT station in Mexico City
- Revolución (Mexibús), a BRT station in Ecatepec, Mexico

== See also ==
- Revolution (disambiguation)
- Viva la revolución (disambiguation)
