= ShyBoy =

American singer-songwriter

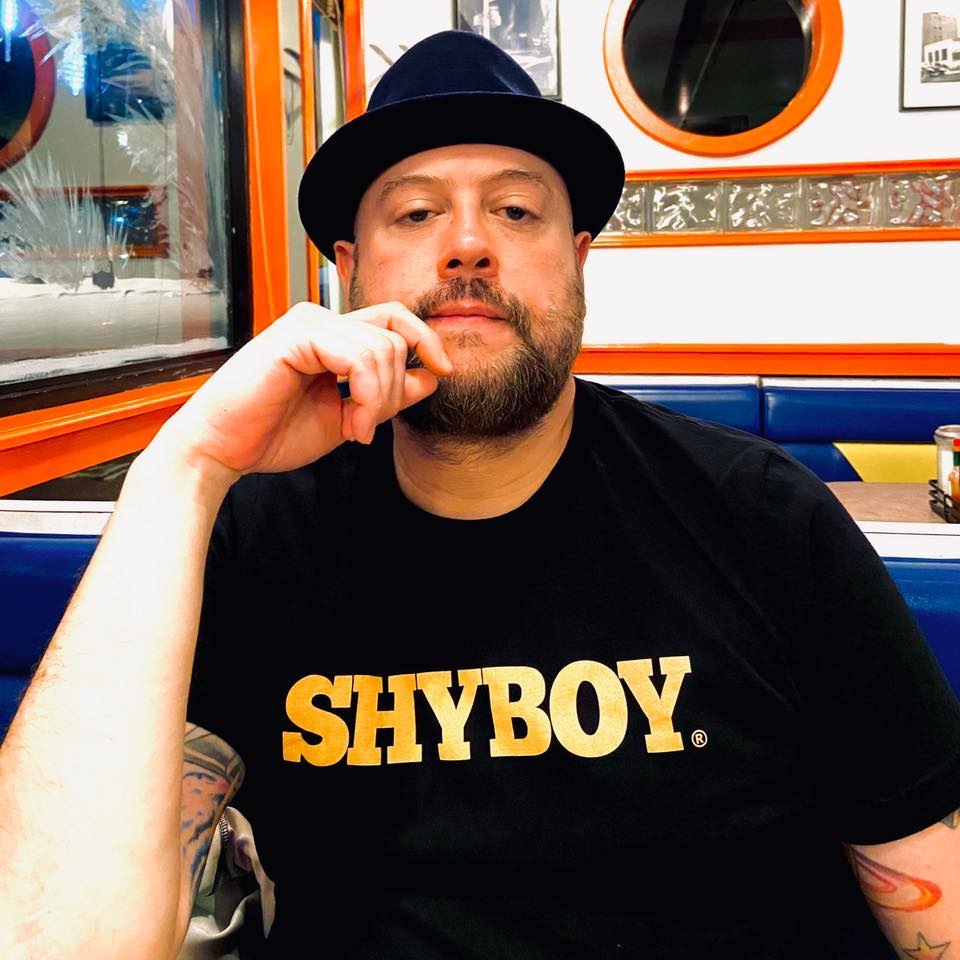
- ShyBoy (NYC, February 2020)

Background information
- Born: Jason Arnold
- Occupation: Singer • songwriter • composer • DJ • record producer
- Years active: 2000-Present
- Labels: The Spaceman Agency, Snafu Records
- Website: shyboy.tv

ShyBoy is an American vocalist, songwriter, music producer, and DJ. He is the music composer for the Emmy-nominated documentary series Queer for Fear: The History of Queer Horror (Shudder/AMC) from executive producer Bryan Fuller. ShyBoy was named Best Solo Artist in the 10th Annual LA Weekly Best of L.A. Readers' Choice Awards and has performed throughout North America and in Europe, sharing the stage with artists such as Flo Rida, Meiko, and Amanda Palmer. ShyBoy's music has been featured in RuPaul's Drag Race, Dynasty, America's Next Top Model, the Capcom video game Devil May Cry 4, and the trailer for the 2018 film Halloween. An array of writers and artists have collaborated with ShyBoy, including: Emmy Award-winning performer RuPaul; hip-hop artist SlimKid3 (The Pharcyde); Grammy-nominated singer-songwriter Wendy Waldman; Saturn Award-winning writer Bryan Fuller; DJ and record producer Darude; and Emmy, Grammy, and Tony Award-winning songwriter Allee Willis. ShyBoy and gold-selling record producer Mark Nubar co-founded the band Hypnogaja and L.A.-based indie label The Spaceman Agency.

== Career ==
=== Solo Work ===
ShyBoy debuted music from his first solo album Water on Mars during a headline performance at the Carmel Art and Film Festival. Released in October 2013 and produced by ShyBoy and Mark Nubar, the album features co-writes with songwriters such as Allee Willis, Ivo Moring, David Batteau, Wendy Waldman, and others. The songs "Bird in Flight" and "Wouldn't It Be Good" were released as singles, with videos directed by filmmaker Michael Bodie and produced by Loretta Ramos. CNN featured "Bird in Flight" during a story about the 50th anniversary of the first spacewalk by NASA astronauts and featured the title track on Newsroom, during a special segment on NASA's definitive discovery of flowing water on Mars.

HuffPost's review of Water on Mars described the album as one that "makes a bold, tuneful impression on today's indie-pop landscape" and that it "is one of the year's smartest, not-to-be-missed debuts." The Monterey County Weekly described ShyBoy's music as "a cross-pollination of RJD2, DJ Shadow and 2001: A Space Odyssey – Arnold's understated vocals quickly erupt into full-blown soulful crooning that's irresistible for eardrums." Kevin Bronson's Buzzbands LA noted ShyBoy's sound as "wonderfully dramatic," and described his music as a cross between Nick Drake, Sufjan Stevens, and M83.

Lost in Space - ShyBoy's second album - was released in 2014 and features material co-written with Emmy and Annie Award-nominated lyricist Amy Powers, multi-platinum music producer Jeff Hoeppner, German electronic music composer/DJ robot koch, Emmy Award-winning composer Jim Dooley, television writer and producer Bryan Fuller (Pushing Daisies, American Gods, Hannibal); and more. The collection contains a cover of the Donna Summer song "She Works Hard for the Money," featured on the Essential Records compilation Café de Paris, Vol. 10.

In 2015, ShyBoy released numerous projects: Daisy Pusher EP (which included "Haven't Heard This Song in Forever," featured on the ABC show Super Fun Night, starring Rebel Wilson); a cover of Sia's "Elastic Heart" followed (recorded as a duet with Kat Robichaud of NBC's The Voice); and the Zero Gravity EP (featuring a remix by Matt Mcjunkins and The Beta Machine).

ShyBoy and multi-platinum songwriter Allee Willis (Earth, Wind & Fire's "September," The Color Purple musical) teamed up with producers Jeff Hoeppner and Mark Nubar to create several singles in 2016 and 2017. The first of these releases - a cover of "Neutron Dance" (the Grammy Award-winning song by The Pointer Sisters, written by Willis and Danny Sembello) - features an animated lyric video directed by Willis, who also illustrated the artwork for the single. HuffPost describes the remake as "an entirely new, indie-pop version of the classic single with ShyBoy’s understated tenor lilting over delicate, synth-driven grooves." Three more releases followed: the originals "Can't Stay With The Pay (Ain't No Little Fairy Gonna Pop Me A Five For That Tooth)" and "He and She;" and a cover version of another one of Willis' hits, the Pet Shop Boys and Dusty Springfield classic "What Have I Done To Deserve This?."

ShyBoy's single "Backroom" was released in October 2018, followed by the Backroom (The Remixes) EP in June 2019. Produced and arranged by ShyBoy, Jeff Hoeppner, and Mark Nubar, "Backroom" was featured in the second season of Dynasty on The CW and described by TheGATE.ca as "timelessly fun" with vocals that are "slick, rich, and addictive." The "Backroom" official music video (directed by Michael Bodie) was premiered by World of Wonder's WOW Presents Plus, which described it as a "gritty masterpiece." In September 2020, "Backroom" was named as an Official Selection in the music video category of the 5th annual QueerX film festival (presented by Lexus and Revry). In December 2020, the Hollywood Music In Media awards officially nominated ShyBoy's "Backroom" recording for a 2021 award in the Alternative music category.

Several releases featured ShyBoy in October 2020 and 2021, including "Superhero;" "1981" (the debut single by the group Warningfield); and "Silence," a Beatport Electronica Top 10 collaboration with Berlin-based artist Purple Kaiser (of Kaiser Souzai), and "The Sky Is Falling."

ShyBoy released the album His Royal Shyness in October 2022. The LP - produced by Jeff Hoeppner, Jeeve, ShyBoy, and Mark Nubar - includes the songs "Backroom," "U Can Get It," "Bad Thoughts," and "Dildo Machine," all featured in the Shudder original series Queer For Fear. In 2025, ShyBoy released His Royal Shyness (King Size Edition) on Snafu Records, featuring the singles "Norman fucking Rockwell" (a cover of the Lana Del Rey song), "Brand New Maybe," "Green Lights and Red Flags (Tetramorph Remix)," and "Dildo Machine (After Dark Remix)" featuring Alaska Thunderfuck.

=== Warningfield ===
ShyBoy is the lead vocalist and co-founding member of the collective Warningfield, a collaboration with film/TV composers Jim Guttridge & Sean Hosein (Beauty & the Beast) and writer/producer Mark Nubar. The group is based in Los Angeles and Paris. Warningfield's sound has been described as a "hybrid of dramatic underscore woven together with conceptual pop songs." Their music was first featured in the trailer for the 2018 remake of Halloween (Blumhouse/Universal). Warningfield's debut single "1981" was released in October 2020. In a review of the song, Buzz Music wrote that ShyBoy's vocals "perfectly complement the surrounding airy and retro sci-fi-inspired production."

=== Hypnogaja ===
ShyBoy's music career began as the lead singer of the band Hypnogaja. He co-wrote and produced numerous recordings with the group, including the critically acclaimed LPs Below Sunset (described by the Denver Post as music that "pushes boundaries"), Truth Decay (described by Outburn magazine as "an expertly crafted album”), and Bridge to Nowhere (a European release by Sony Music Germany). Hypnogaja toured consistently throughout the United States and Canada, opening for artists such as 311, Linda Perry, Shinedown, and Saliva. The band appeared on the debut episode of Stripped Down Live, hosted by Tears For Fears' Curt Smith. ShyBoy received the award for Best Male Vocalist at the 2nd Annual Hollywood Music In Media Awards, for Hypnogaja's cover of the Donna Summer song, "On The Radio." Hypnogaja t-shirts and posters were featured in the pilot episode of the Bryan Fuller series, Dead Like Me. In February 2020, Hypnogaja released the single "Lovesick," the band's first release since the 2011 single "Dark Star" (featuring SlimKid3). In July 2022, the band released the single "Circle of Hate" via The Spaceman Agency label. In 2025, Hypnogaja returned with a series of new singles on Snafu Records, beginning with "Dead of Winter" in February, followed by "Escalate" in May, and "Open/Wide" in June.

=== RuPaul Collaboration ===
The mashup concept album The RuPaul Mixtape marked the beginning of ShyBoy's collaboration with RuPaul, including five singles for the Emmy Award-winning show RuPaul's Drag Race (seasons 4, 5, and 6). The songs - "The Shade of It All," "Runway Girl," "Reading is Fundamental," "It's Not Personal (It's Drag)," and "Oh No She Better Don't" - were written by RuPaul, ShyBoy, and Mark Nubar, and released by World of Wonder. ShyBoy created two mixes, entitled "Shade" and "Serve," for RuPaul's Drag Race's Draglympics challenges in episode 6 of season 11. In June 2021, ShyBoy released The RuPaul Mixtape Vol. II. In July 2024, RuPaul released the ShyBoy remix of the song "Everybody Say Love."

=== Music in Film, TV, and Games ===
ShyBoy composed tracks for several cycles of Tyra Banks' America's Next Top Model and co-wrote songs for on-screen performances by characters in HBO's Six Feet Under and the Joss Whedon series Dollhouse (starring Eliza Dushku). ShyBoy collaborated with composer Tetsuya Shibata on the end title for Capcom's multi-platinum video game Devil May Cry 4. The song, "Shall Never Surrender," was also released on a special soundtrack by Sony Music Japan. Songs written and composed by ShyBoy have been featured in: Scream 4 (trailer); Roswell; Sex and the City; One Life to Live; Frank Beddor's Looking Glass Wars; Cold Creek Manor (starring Sharon Stone); Valentine (starring David Boreanaz); FlatOut: Ultimate Carnage; and more.

ShyBoy and Mark Nubar composed the score for the Emmy-nominated documentary series Queer For Fear: The History Of Queer Horror (from executive producer Bryan Fuller) which debuted on Shudder and AMC on September 30, 2022. ShyBoy's song "Backroom" serves as the main title for the show.

=== Producer and DJ ===
ShyBoy has produced remixes for numerous artists (including RuPaul, Whitney Houston, Julia Fordham, and Donna Summer) and created several mashup dance parties, including MaDonna Summer (a tribute to Madonna and Donna Summer); Britney Houston (a tribute to Britney Spears and Whitney Houston); Rihyoncé (a tribute to Rihanna and Beyoncé); Gaga Lipa (a tribute to Lady Gaga and Dua Lipa); and Kylie Cyrus (a tribute to Kylie Minogue and Miley Cyrus). ShyBoy was the featured DJ at the official premiere party for the Broadway revival of West Side Story in New York City in 2020 and created a mashup mix and medley for The B-52's 2022 farewell concert tour. ShyBoy's remix of the Donna Summer song "Supernatural Love" was released as a single on February 14, 2025 and included on the 40th anniversary edition of the album Cats Without Claws.

== Discography ==
=== Albums, EPs, Singles ===
- 2025: His Royal Shyness (King Size Edition) [LP]
- 2025: Dildo Machine (After Hours Remix) (feat. Alaska Thunderfuck) [Single]
- 2025: Green Lights and Red Flags (Tetramorph Remix) (Single)
- 2025: Norman fucking Rockwell (Single)
- 2025: Brand New Maybe (Single)
- 2025: Norman fucking Rockwell (Single)
- 2023: Queer For Fear: The History Of Queer Horror (Original Score and Soundtrack) (LP)
- 2022: His Royal Shyness (LP)
- 2022: Bad Thoughts (Single)
- 2022: Sex Doll (Single)
- 2022: Bedroom Secrets (Single)
- 2021: The Sky Is Falling (Single)
- 2020: Superhero (Single)
- 2019: Lottery (Single)
- 2019: U Can Get It (Single)
- 2019: Backroom (The Remixes) (EP)
- 2019: In The Air Tonight (Single)
- 2018: Backroom (Single)
- 2017: What Have I Done to Deserve This? (feat. Allee Willis) [Single]
- 2017: He and She (Single)
- 2017: Can't Stay with the Pay (Ain't No Little Fairy Gonna Pop Me a Five for That Tooth) (Single)
- 2016: Neutron Dance (Single)
- 2015: The Murder Ballads (EP)
- 2015: The Murder Mixtape
- 2015: Zero Gravity (EP)
- 2015: Daisy Pusher (EP)
- 2014: Lost in Space (LP)
- 2014: The Interstellar Travel Companion Mixtape
- 2014: Lonely Disco (EP)
- 2013: Water on Mars (LP)
- 2013: Wouldn't It Be Good (Single)
- 2012: Bird in Flight (Single)

=== Collaborations ===
- 2025: Supernatural Love (ShyBoy Remix) - Donna Summer
- 2024: Everybody Say Love (ShyBoy Remix) - RuPaul
- 2023: Dildo Machine - ShyBoy feat. Alaska Thunderfuck
- 2021: ShyBoy presents The RuPaul Mixtape Vol. II - RuPaul & ShyBoy
- 2020: Silence (single) - Purple Kaiser feat. ShyBoy
- 2020: 1981 (Single) - Warningfield
- 2020: Raggabot (Push the Button) (Single) - Ghost Cave feat. ShyBoy
- 2019: MaDonna Summer (10th Anniversary Platinum Edition) - Mixed by DJ ShyBoy
- 2016: Where Does The Time Go? (ShyBoy Remix) - Julia Fordham
- 2014: Oh No She Better Don't (Single) - RuPaul & DJ ShyBoy
- 2014: Shock and Awe (ShyBoy Remix) • Purple Crush, Raja, Josh Peace
- 2013: It's Not Personal (It's Drag) (Single) - RuPaul & DJ ShyBoy
- 2013: Reading is Fundamental (Single) - RuPaul & DJ ShyBoy
- 2013: Runway Girl (Single) - RuPaul & DJ ShyBoy
- 2013: The Shade of It All (Single) - RuPaul & DJ ShyBoy
- 2013: Headspin (Single) - Eddie Amador feat. ShyBoy
- 2012: The Beginning (DJ ShyBoy Remix) - RuPaul
- 2012: ShyBoy presents The RuPaul Mixtape - RuPaul & ShyBoy
- 2012: Welcome to the Future (single) - Kristina Sky and Randy Boyer feat. ShyBoy
- 2009: MaDonna Summer - DJ ShyBoy & Freddy, King of Pants with DJ Nubar
- 2008: Devil May Cry 4 ("Shall Never Surrender," "The Time Has Come") - ShyBoy, Tetsuya Shibata

=== Hypnogaja ===
- Hypnogaja Discography
