= Revolution (Crematory album) =

Studio album by Crematory
- Released: 3 May 2004
- Recorded: 2003–2004
- Genre: Gothic metal, industrial metal
- Length: 46:42
- Language: English, German
- Label: Nuclear Blast
- Producer: Crematory

Crematory chronology
Believe (2000)	Revolution (2004)	Klagebilder (2006)

Singles from Revolution
- 1. "Greed" Released: 1 March 2004

Professional ratings
Review scores
Source	Rating
AllMusic	3.5/5 stars

Revolution is the eighth studio album by German gothic metal band Crematory. It was released on 3 May 2004 through German record label Nuclear Blast. The album was their first release after the band's three year dissolution. The album was released in an enhanced digipack version.

== Track listing ==
No.	Title	Length
1.	"Resurrection"	03:03
2.	"Wake Up"	03:03
3.	"Greed"	04:47
4.	"Reign of Fear"	04:36
5.	"Open Your Eyes"	04:15
6.	"Tick Tack"	03:59
7.	"Angel of Fate"	05:02
8.	"Solitary Psycho"	03:05
9.	"Revolution"	03:27
10.	"Human Blood"	03:25
11.	"Red Sky"	04:16
12.	"Farewell Letter"	03:44
Total length:		46:42

== Personnel ==
- Felix – vocals
- Matthias Hechler – guitars, vocals
- Katrin Jüllich – keyboards, layout
- Harald Heine – bass
- Markus Jüllich – drums, programming, producer, mixing, mastering

=== Additional personnel ===
- Hady Müller – photography
- Kristian Kohlmannslehner – engineering
- Jürgen "Luski" Lusky – mastering
- Gerhard Magin – mixing
- Raimond Neck – cover art
