= Spanish Revolution =

Spanish Revolution may refer to:

- Revolt of the Comuneros, a popular uprising in Castile against Charles I
- Mutiny of Aranjuez, an uprising in 1808 against Charles IV that became a prelude to the French invasion of Spain
- Pronouncement of Lacy, a failed revolt by Francisco Milans del Bosch and Luis de Lacy against Ferdinand VII
- Trienio Liberal (1820–1823), the establishment of a liberal government in Spain and the restoration of the Constitution of 1812
- Spanish Revolution of 1854, also known as the Vicalvarada, a revolution in Madrid that began the Bienio progresista
- Glorious Revolution (Spain) (1868), a revolution against Queen Isabella II
- Petroleum Revolution (1873), a workers' revolution in Alcoy
- Cantonal rebellion (1873-1874), a cantonalist revolt to establish a federal republic from the bottom-up
- Proclamation of the Second Spanish Republic (1931)
- Alt Llobregat insurrection (1932), a general strike to establish libertarian communism in Central Catalonia
- Anarchist insurrection of January 1933, a general strike for higher wages throughout Spain
- Anarchist insurrection of December 1933, a general strike to establish libertarian communism in Aragon
- Revolution of 1934, a revolutionary general strike in Asturias and Catalunya during the black biennium
- Spanish Civil War, a military uprising against the Second Spanish Republic
- Spanish Revolution of 1936, a workers' social revolution that coincided with the Spanish Civil War
- The Spanish Revolution, 1931-1939 (Trotsky book), a collection of texts written by Russian revolutionary Leon Trotsky on the Spanish Civil War
- Spanish transition to democracy, the formal end of Francoist Spain and the reinstatement of parliamentarism
