= Crematory (band) =

German metal band

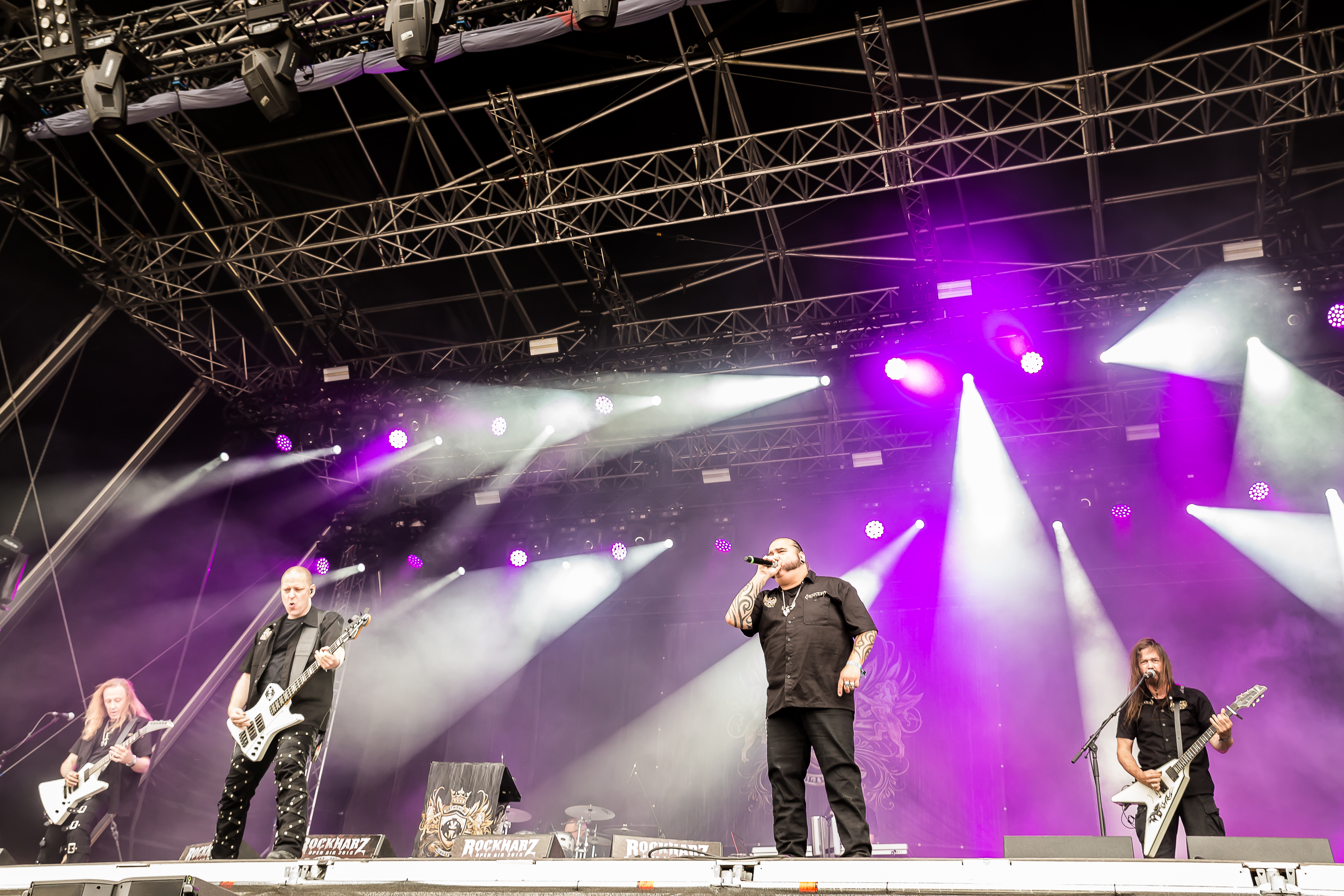
- Crematory at Rockharz 2018

Background information
- Origin: Westhofen, Germany
- Genres: Gothic metal; melodic death metal; industrial metal; Neue Deutsche Härte; death metal (early)
- Years active: 1991–2001; 2003–present
- Labels: Massacre; Nuclear Blast; Steamhammer/SPV; Napalm
- Members: Gerhard "Felix" Stass; Markus Jüllich; Katrin Jüllich; Rolf Munkes; Patrick Schmid
- Past members: Lothar "Lotte" Först; Marc Zimmer; Heinz Steinhauser; Harald Heine; Matthias Hechler; Tosse Basler; Jason Mathias; Connie Andreszka
- Website: crematory.de

Crematory is a German gothic metal band formed in Mannheim, Baden-Württemberg in 1991.

== History ==
The band received its earliest recognition in the mid-1990s by touring with My Dying Bride, Tiamat and Atrocity. Much like the latter two groups, the band had begun as traditional death metal, then evolved in an industrial music and gothic metal musical direction on later albums. The band received heavy rotation on MTV Germany, and made appearances at various extreme metal festivals, including Germany's Wacken Open Air in 1996, 1998, 1999, 2001 and 2008, in addition to inclusion on Nuclear Blast compilation samplers.

The band re-signed to Massacre Records in 2006 after a 10-year stint with Nuclear Blast; Massacre had been the band's first label. In 2013 they signed with Steamhammer/SPV to release their next album, Antiserum. In 2019 they moved to Napalm Records, and their 15th studio album, Unbroken, was released under their label, on 6 March 2020.

Active for 30 years (with a brief split between 2001 and 2003) they are among Europe's longest-running gothic metal bands.

== Line-up ==
=== Current members ===
- Gerhard "Felix" Stass – lead vocals (1991–present)
- Markus Jüllich – drums, programming (1991–present)
- Katrin Jüllich – keyboards, samples (1992–present)
- Rolf Munkes – lead guitar (2015–present)
- Patrick Schmid – bass (2021–present)

=== Former members ===
- Marc Zimmer – bass, backing vocals (1991–1992)
- Lothar "Lotte" Först – guitars, backing vocals (1991–1998)
- Harald Heine – bass, backing vocals (1993–2016)
- Heinz Steinhauser – bass, backing vocals (1993; died 2021)
- Matthias Hechler – guitars, clean vocals (1998–2015)
- Tosse Basler – rhythm guitar, clean vocals (2015–2018)
- Jason Mathias – bass (2016–2021)
- Connie "Conner" Andreszka – rhythm guitar, clean vocals (2018–2021)

== Discography ==
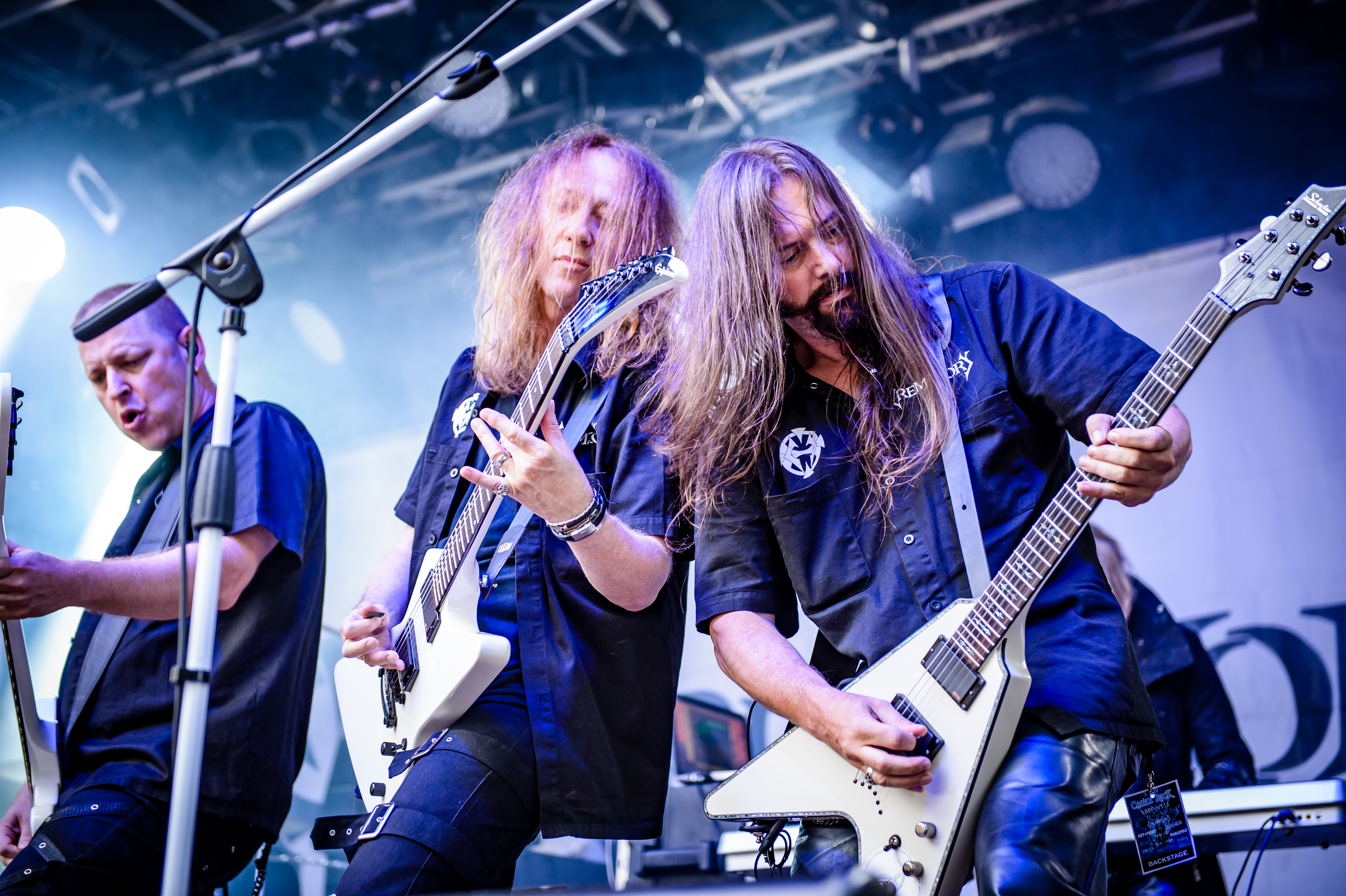
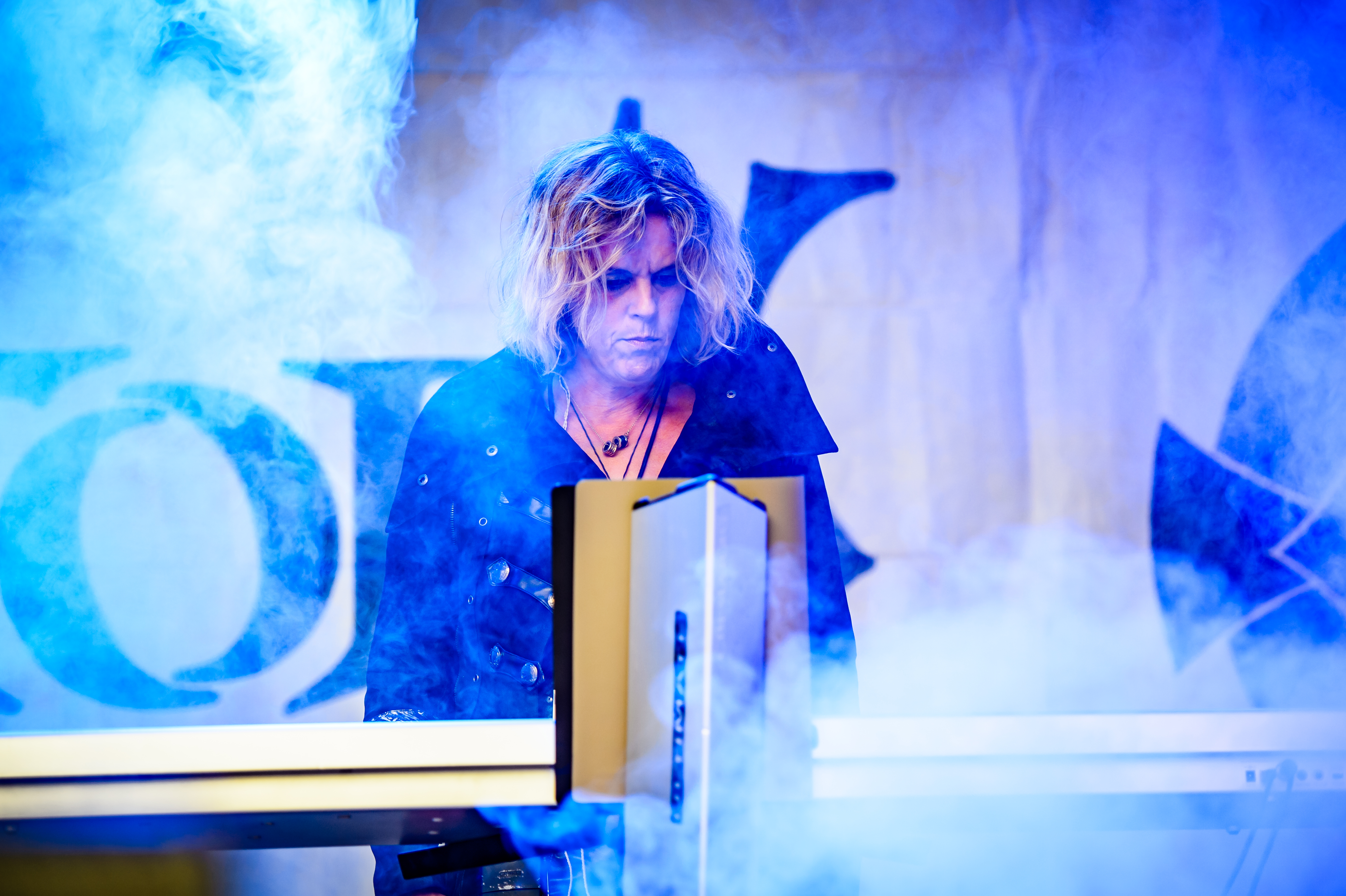
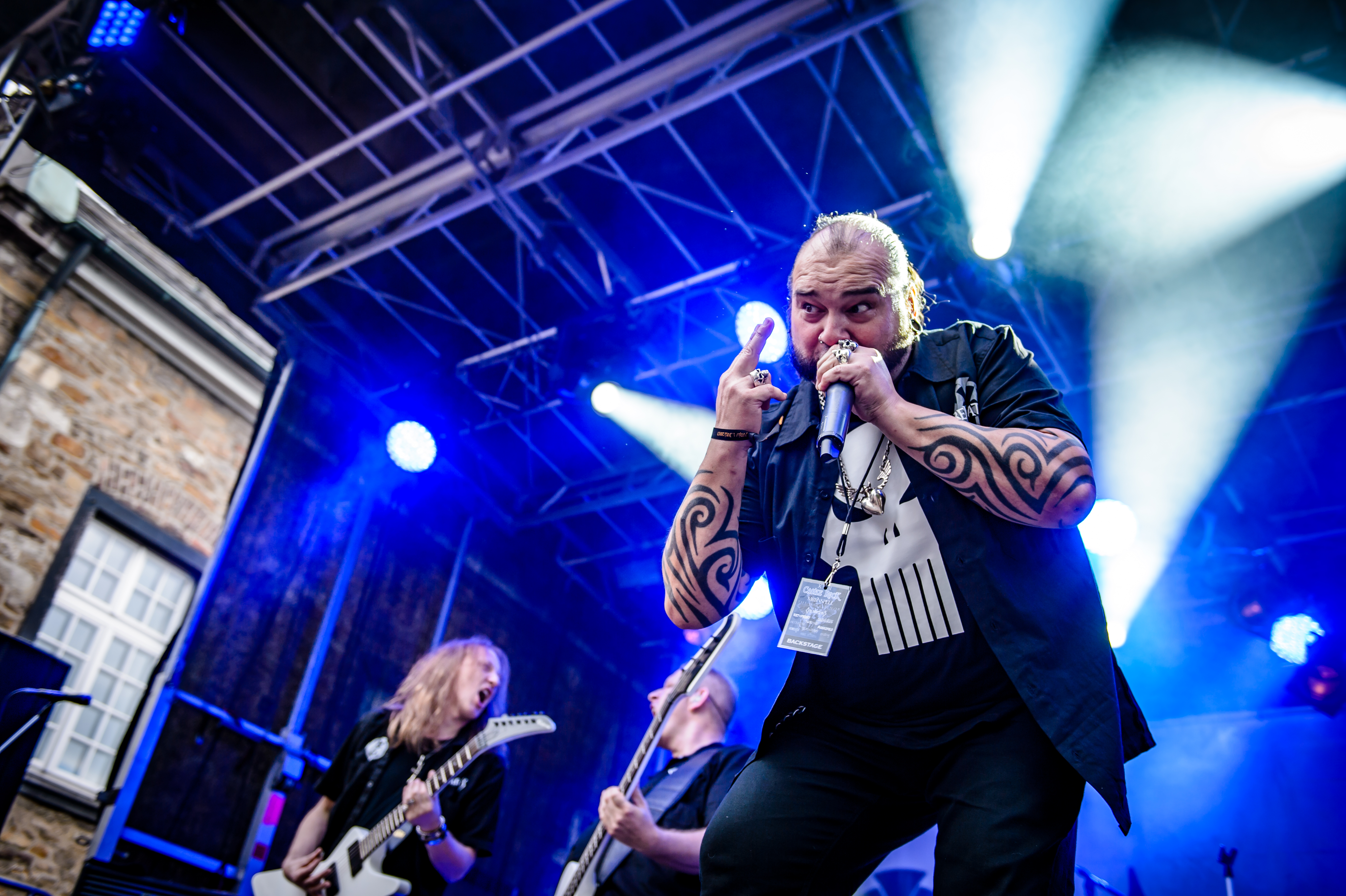
Crematory performing in 2017

=== Demos ===
- Crematory (1992)

=== Studio albums ===
- Transmigration (1993)
- ...Just Dreaming (1994)
- Illusions (1995)
- Crematory (1996)
- Awake (1997)
- Act Seven (1999)
- Believe (2000)
- Revolution (2004)
- Klagebilder (2006)
- Pray (2008)
- Infinity (2010)
- Antiserum (2014)
- Monument (2016)
- Oblivion (2018)
- Unbroken (2020)
- Inglorious Darkness (2022)
- Destination (2025)

=== Live albums ===
- Live... at the Out of the Dark Festivals (1997)
- Live Revolution (2005)
- Live in Wacken (2008)
- Black Pearls (2010)
- Live at W.O.A (2014)
- Live Insurrection (2017)
- Live at Wacken (2022)

=== Singles and EPs ===
- Ist es wahr (1996)
- Fly (1999)
- Greed (2004)
- Shadowmaker (2013)
- The Downfall (2020)

=== Compilation albums ===
- Early Years (1999)
- Remind (2001)
- Black Pearls (2010)
- Inception (2013)
