= Cosmic Rough Riders =

Scottish rock band

- Origin: Glasgow, Scotland
- Genres: Alternative rock, folk rock, pop rock
- Years active: 1998–2008; 2015–present
- Labels: Poptones, Measured, Korova
- Members: Daniel Wylie; Stephen Fleming
- Past members: Mark Brown; James Clifford; Paul Docherty; Stephen Fleming; Gary Cuthbert
- Website: www.cosmicroughriders.com

The Cosmic Rough Riders are an alternative rock band from Glasgow, Scotland. They were originally formed in 1998 by Daniel Wylie and Stephen Fleming, and later they were joined by Mark Brown, James Clifford, Gary Cuthbert and Paul Docherty. To date they have recorded five albums, and had four singles in the UK top 40.

== Recording history ==
They self-released the albums Deliverance (1999) and Panorama (2000), both having been recorded in a community funded recording studio located in Glasgow's Castlemilk housing scheme. Both albums were named in Virgin's Encyclopaedia of the Greatest Albums of All Time.

Cosmic Rough Riders signed a one album license deal with Poptones Records, the newly formed label of ex-Creation Records boss Alan McGee, who released the band's third album, Enjoy the Melodic Sunshine in November 2000, actually a compilation of songs from Panorama and Deliverance.

Single releases in 2001 earned them increasing numbers of fans in the press. Their single "Revolution (In the Summertime?)" was released and went into the UK Singles Chart, scoring them their first Top 40 hit and debut on BBC Television's Top of the Pops. This was immediately followed into the chart by "The Pain Inside", giving them back-to-back Top 40 hit single success.

By the end of 2001, the album Enjoy the Melodic Sunshine had achieved silver status (sales of 60,000) in the UK and it was named by Q magazine as one of the 50 best albums of the year.

In March 2002, founder member of Cosmic Rough Riders, Stephen Fleming added lead vocals to his duties when original singer, Daniel Wylie, left to pursue a solo career. The release in September 2002 of the rarities and b-sides album, Pure Escapism, was the closing of one chapter in the band's story.

June 2003 saw the release of "Because You". It entered the UK Singles Chart at number 34 – becoming the band's third successive Top 40 hit and their highest entry yet.

The self-written and self-produced album, Too Close to See Far was released by Measured Records in July 2003. The entire album was play-listed by BBC Radio 2 and on its release, entered the UK's official independent chart at number 7. A second single from the album was released in September 2003, and "Justify the Rain" entered the UK Singles Chart, giving the band four Top 40 hits in a row. 2003 ended with Cosmic Rough Riders being the recipients of the best newcomer award at the Tartan Clef Awards ceremony, an event that raised over £100,000 for the charity, Nordoff Robbins Music Therapy. The band were presented with their award by Scotland's First Minister, Jack McConnell.

During 2005 the band wrote and recorded a new album, The Stars Look Different from Down Here, in southern Spain. The album was released in May 2006.

== Touring history ==
The Cosmic Rough Riders have performed at major UK music festivals including Carling Weekend, Glasgow Green and T In The Park. The band have played at the Norwegian festival Quart; plus two Japanese festivals, Summersonic and Fuji Rock. They have appeared as guests of several other touring artists, including the Black Crowes, Ocean Colour Scene, Stereophonics, Paul Weller, Robert Plant, Lenny Kravitz, and were twice invited to appear as special guests of U2 when they performed in Scotland. When they made a special appearance at Glasgow Barrowlands as part of a show paying tribute to the Scottish singer-songwriter Frankie Miller, they were joined onstage by Joe Walsh (Eagles). He played guitar on the track "When I'm Away From You", recorded by Cosmic Rough Riders, and released on a Frankie Miller tribute album.

== Discography ==
=== Albums ===
- Deliverance (1999)
- Panorama (2000)
- Enjoy the Melodic Sunshine (2000)
- Pure Escapism (2002) (Japanese Edition)
- Too Close to See Far (2003)
- The Stars Look Different From Down Here (2006)

=== Singles ===
- "Melanie" (February 2001) UK No. 111
- "Baby, You're So Free" (April 2001) UK No. 76
- "Revolution (In the Summertime?)" (July 2001) UK No. 35
- "The Pain Inside" (September 2001) UK No. 36
- "Because You" (June 2003) UK No. 34
- "Justify the Rain" (September 2003) UK No. 39
- "In Time" (May 2006)
- "When You Come Around" (July 2006)
