= Revolutions (disambiguation) =

Revolutions are fundamental changes in power that take place in relatively short periods of time.

Revolutions may also refer to:

- Revolutions (Jean Michel Jarre album), a 1988 electronic album
- Revolutions (The X-Ecutioners album), a 2004 hip-hop album
- Revolutions (Blind Channel album), a 2016 rock album
- Révolutions (novel), a 2003 novel by French author J.M.G. Le Clézio
- Revolutions (podcast), a podcast series by the history podcaster Mike Duncan
- The Matrix Revolutions, a 2003 science fiction action film
- Victoria: Revolutions, the expansion pack for Victoria: An Empire Under the Sun

== See also ==
- Revolution (disambiguation)
