= Revolution (In the Summertime?) =

2001 single by Cosmic Rough Riders

Single by Cosmic Rough Riders

from the album Enjoy the Melodic Sunshine
- Released: 2001
- Genre: Rock
- Label: Poptones

"Revolution (In the Summertime?)" is a song by the Scottish rock band Cosmic Rough Riders. Released in 2001, it was one of two Top 40 hits for the band that year, along with "The Pain Inside".

== Track listing ==
1. "Revolution (In the Summertime?)"
2. "Move Along"
3. "The Gun Isn't Loaded" (live)

Poptones MC5047SCD
