= The Earth Embraces Us All =

Studio album by Temperance
- Released: 16 September 2016
- Genres: Power metal, symphonic metal
- Length: 60:22
- Label: Scarlet

Temperance chronology
| Limitless (2015) | The Earth Embraces Us All (2016) | Of Jupiter and Moons (2018) |

Professional ratings
Review scores
| Source | Rating |
|---|---|
| Eternal Terror | 6/6 |
| Hallowed | 4/7 |
| Metal Temple | 10/10 |
| Stormbringer | 4.5/5 |

The Earth Embraces Us All is the third studio album by Italian power metal band Temperance. It was released via Scarlet Records on 16 September 2016. It is the last album to drummer Giulio Capone and female vocalist Chiara Tricarico. After former male vocalist Sandro Capone left before recording, guitarist/harsh vocalist Marco Pastorino took over on clean vocals temporarily. The album has received positive feedback.

== Track listing ==
The Earth Embraces Us All track listing
| No. | Title | Length |
|---|---|---|
| 1. | "A Thousand Places" | 6:29 |
| 2. | "At the Edge of Space" | 4:32 |
| 3. | "Unspoken Words" | 4:04 |
| 4. | "Empty Lines" | 4:30 |
| 5. | "Maschere" | 3:25 |
| 6. | "Haze" | 4:20 |
| 7. | "Fragments of Life" | 3:44 |
| 8. | "Revolution" | 4:15 |
| 9. | "Advice from a Caterpillar" | 8:11 |
| 10. | "Change the Rhyme" | 4:21 |
| 11. | "The Restless Ride" | 12:42 |
| Total length: | | 60:33 |

== Personnel ==
Temperance

- Chiara Tricarico – female clean vocals
- Marco Pastorino – guitars, male clean/harsh vocals
- Luca Negro – bass
- Giulio Capone – drums, keyboards
