= Michele Guaitoli =

Italian composer and metal singer

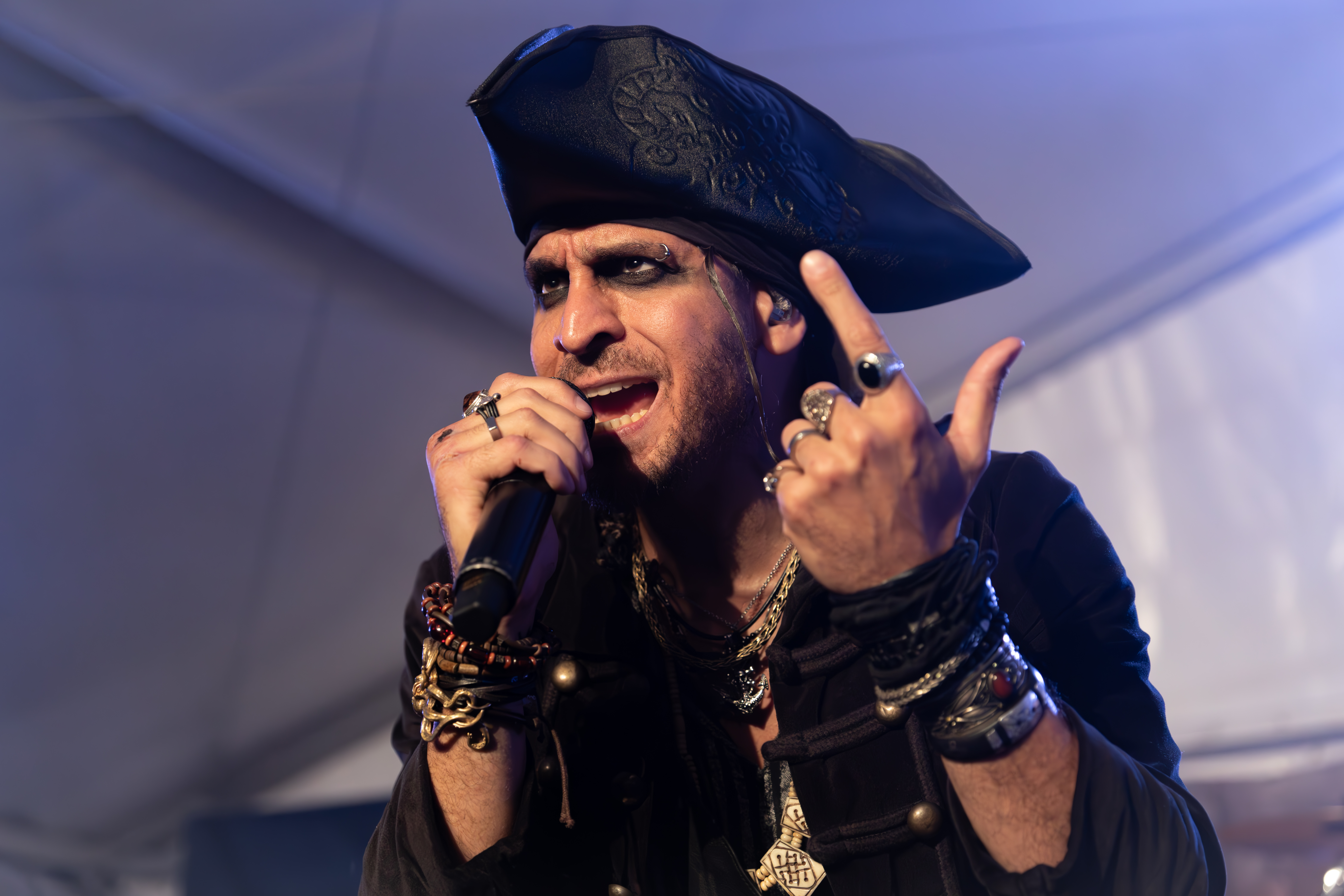
- Michele Guaitoli at Metal & Tattoo Festival in Austria, 2023

Background information
- Born: 12 April 1985 (age 41); Gorizia, Italy
- Genres: Power metal; symphonic metal
- Occupation: Vocalist
- Years active: 2003–present
- Label: Napalm Records
- Member of: Visions of Atlantis; Temperance; Era
- Formerly of: Hammered; Kaledon; Ship of Theseus; Overtures
- Website: www.micheleguaitoli.com

Michele Guaitoli (born 12 April 1985 in Gorizia, Friuli-Venezia Giulia) is an Italian metal singer, music producer, songwriter, lyricist and multi-instrumentalist. Known for his work in symphonic metal and power metal, he is currently the lead singer for Visions of Atlantis, Temperance and Era.

== Career ==
He began music at the age of seven with piano lessons, perfecting his skills in modern singing and jazz in adulthood.

In 2003 he joined the Italian heavy metal band Overtures in which he is not active anymore. The debut album Beyond the Waterfall was released 2008.

He has been singing for the Italian power metal band Temperance since spring 2018 and can be heard on four of the band's studio albums.

In late 2018 he also joined the symphonic metal band Visions of Atlantis, having previously replaced then-singer Siegfried Samer on a couple of gigs. Together with the Austrians he has already released three studio records and three live records and has played concerts not only in many European countries but also in Latin and North America. He also performed at major festivals with the band. Among them the German Wacken Open Air, the Masters of Rock in the Czech Republic or the 70000 Tons of Metal cruise.

The musician is also part of the French music project Era, which toured France and Belgium with him for the first time in 2019.

In his studio The Groove Factory Guaitoli not only works with his own bands, but also with numerous other artists. Among others Desperation BVLD, Hammered, Overtures, Emetropia or SheWolf.

== Discography ==
=== Visions of Atlantis ===
Studio albums:

- Wanderers (2019)
- Pirates (2022)
- Pirates II – Armada (2024)

Live albums:

- The Deep & The Dark Live (2019)
- A Symphonic Journey to Remember (2020)
- Pirates over Wacken (2023)
- Armada LIVE Over Europe (2025)

=== Temperance ===
Studio albums:

- Of Jupiter and Moons (2018)
- Viridian (Temperance album) (2020)
- Diamanti (Temperance album) (2021)
- Hermitage – Daruma's Eyes Pt 2 (2023)
- Arcani (2026)

EP:

- Melodies of Green and Blue (2021)

=== Era ===
Live albums:

- Era: The Live Experience (2022)

=== Overtures ===
Studio albums:

- Beyond the Waterfall (2008)
- Rebirth (2011)
- Entering the Maze (2013)
- Artifacts (2016)

=== Kaledon ===
Studio albums:

- Carnagus: Emperor of the Darkness (2017)
- Legend of the Forgotten Reign – Chapter VII: Evil Awakens (2022)

=== Pentesilea Road ===
Studio albums:

- Pentesilea Road (2021) - Vocals on "Stains"
- Sonnets from the drowsiness (2025)
