= Revolution (2023 film) =

- Theatrical release poster
- Directed by: Nazareth Vega
- Written by: Nazareth Vega
- Produced by: Lucía Gutiérrez
- Starring: Imanol Rivera; Luis Arroyo; Andrea Marla
- Cinematography: Raúl Rossel
- Edited by: Nazareth Vega
- Music by: Rodrigo Ponce Aparicio
- Production company: Mestizo Films
- Release date: March 30, 2023 (Arequipa)
- Running time: 77 minutes
- Country: Peru
- Language: Spanish

Revolution (Spanish: Revolución) is a 2023 Peruvian coming-of-age drama film written, edited and directed by Nazareth Vega in her directorial debut, starring Imanol Rivera, Luis Arroyo and Andrea Marla. It is about a teenager who dreams of being a musician, but after not being chosen in a talent casting, he runs away from home to live on the streets where he will revalue his friendship with his friends.

== Synopsis ==
Daniel is a high school senior who dreams of being a musician, but after not being selected in a talent casting, his world falls apart. He is tormented by memories of his last relationship, he has a fight with his father and even argues with Teo and Mariana, his best friends. One day Daniel decides to run away from home, beginning a journey towards a hostile world, which will test his integrity as a person, but will also make him revalue the friendship of Teo and Mariana and the love of his family.

== Cast ==
- Imanol Rivera as Daniel Raeli
- Luis Arroyo as Teo
- Andrea Marla as Mariana
- Adrián Mercado as Daniel's father
- Martha Rebaza as Mariana's grandmother
- Patricia Leyva Rodriguez
- Lizeth Fernández

== Production ==
Principal photography began on January 13, 2019, and ended that same year. Then, in 2020, the editing phase began and new scenes were recorded the next year.

== Release ==
The film had an alternative distribution through cultural centers and Peruvian independent theaters whose first screening was on March 30, 2023, at the Mario Vargas Llosa House Museum, Arequipa, then it was screened on June 21, 2023, at the Cinema Hall of El Galpón, in Pueblo Libre, on June 23, 2023, at the Museum of Contemporary Art of Lima, Barranco, from the 24th to the 25th of the same month in the Armando Robles Godoy movie theater, Lima.

== Reception ==
Nilton Arana Torres from Cinencuentro comments that the film doesn't finish developing its own personality because the visual, narrative or sound proposal clashes at various times. Likewise, the characters' conflict is not explored correctly due to the length and inconsistent performances on the part of the cast. However, he highlights photography because it manages to capture the grandeur of rural areas.
