= Restoration War =

Restoration War may refer to:

- Portuguese Restoration War (1640–1668)
- Dominican Restoration War (1863–1865)

== See also ==
- Restoration (disambiguation)
