= R-Evolution =

R-Evolution may refer to:

- R-Evolution (film), a 2013 music documentary about the Doors
- R-Evolution (Cochrane), a 2015 sculpture by Marco Cochrane
- NXT TakeOver: R Evolution, a 2014 professional wrestling event
