= Viridian (Temperance album) =

Studio album by Temperance
- Released: 24 January 2020
- Genres: Power metal; symphonic metal
- Length: 48:18
- Label: Napalm

Temperance chronology
Of Jupiter and Moons (2018)	Viridian (2020)	Diamanti (2021)

Professional ratings
Review scores
Source	Rating
The Dark Melody	8/10
Metal Temple	8/10
Sound in Review	4/5
Time for Metal	8/10

Viridian is the fifth studio album by Italian power metal band Temperance. It was released on 24 January 2020 by Napalm Records, the band's first for the label. The digital edition includes a bonus track, "Lost in the Christmas Dream", originally released as a single on 8 December 2019.

== Track listing ==
Viridian track listing
No.	Title	Length
1.	"Mission Impossible"	4:06
2.	"I Am the Fire"	4:06
3.	"Start Another Round"	4:10
4.	"My Demons Can't Sleep"	3:58
5.	"Viridian"	4:27
6.	"Let It Beat"	3:36
7.	"Scent of Dye"	3:58
8.	"The Cult of Mystery"	4:25
9.	"Nanook"	5:47
10.	"Gaia"	4:17
11.	"Catch the Dream"	1:49
12.	"Lost in the Christmas Dream" (digital edition bonus track)	3:34
Total length:		48:18

== Personnel ==
Temperance

- Alessia Scolletti – female clean vocals
- Michele Guaitoli – male clean vocals, keyboards
- Marco Pastorino – guitars, harsh vocals
- Luca Negro – bass
- Alfonso Mocerino – drums
