= Revolution (Hypnogaja album) =

Studio album by Hypnogaja
- Released: 1999
- Recorded: 1999
- Genre: Trip hop
- Length: 71:57
- Label: Drama Music / PARAS Group / Ryko Dist. Partners
- Producer: Hypnogaja

Hypnogaja chronology
Revolution (1999)	Post-Hypnotic Stress Disorder (2002)

Revolution is the debut album by Hypnogaja. Released in 1999 by Drama Music via PARAS Group (and distributed by Ryko Distribution Partners via Universal), it is out of print and has not been released digitally. The LP's sound represents the band's origins in electronic music. As Hypnogaja's live show developed, the band began to incorporate guitars and acoustic drums which resulted in a more rock-oriented sound on subsequent releases.

Soon after independently releasing the project, Hypnogaja signed with Los Angeles based music publisher PEN Music Group and began a long string of music features in films, television shows, and video games, with their first placements appearing in projects by filmmaker Zalman King and on ABC's One Life to Live, and HBO's Sex And The City.

Hypnogaja also scored the independent feature film The Young Unknowns (Indican Pictures) directed by Catherine Jelski and starring Devon Gummersall, Leslie Bibb, Eion Bailey, and Arly Jover. The band used several pieces from Revolution to underscore the movie, including the song "Blue," which served as the end title.

== Track list ==
1. "Look at Me (I Need Everything)" (3:14)
2. "Sleep" (5:15)
3. "Obsession" (3:44)
4. "Blue" (4:53)
5. "Lust" (5:02)
6. "Street Kid" (5:50)
7. "Down by the River" (4:00)
8. "Take Me Away (Alien Spaceship)" (4:30)
9. "My Private World" (4:28)
10. "Tears" (4:58)
11. "You Belong to Me" (4:15)
12. "Hollywoods" (4:33)
13. "Fear" (5:49)
14. "Hypnagogic Images" (6:30)
15. "Cold Night Air" (4:56)
