= Truth Decay (Hypnogaja album) =

Studio album by Hypnogaja
- Released: June 30, 2009
- Recorded: June 2007 – July 2008 in Los Angeles
- Genre: Alternative metal, space rock
- Length: 55:22
- Label: Union State Records
- Producer: Jeeve, Mark Nubar, ShyBoy

Hypnogaja chronology
Audio From The Last Night's Dream (2007)	Truth Decay (2009)

Singles from Truth Decay
- 1. "The March" Released: 2008; 2. "Apocalyptic Love Song" Released: 2009; 3. "Worship Me (I'm On TV)" Released: 2009; 4. "Welcome To The Future / On The Radio [Digital 45]" Released: 2010; 5. "Dark Star (featuring Slimkid3 of The Pharcyde)" Released: 2011

Truth Decay is the fifth studio album by Hypnogaja. The project's first single, "The March," spawned a music video directed by ASC Award-winning cinematographer, Nelson Cragg. During their tour in support of the album, Hypnogaja appeared on the debut episode of Stripped Down Live (hosted by Tears For Fears' Curt Smith) and performed a showcase slot at South by Southwest.

== Concept ==
Truth Decay is a science fiction-tinged concept album in which all of the songs revolve around the central story of a world's dramatic, apocalyptic end – and how life cycles into new chapters. The album cover art was illustrated by Kevin Grimm. The various paintings illustrate the album's concept, telling the story of one world's end - and the dawn of a new one. Hypnogaja's keyboardist, Mark Nubar, said in an interview with Noisecreep that the album's music is influenced by rock music of the 70s and 80s – bands like Queen and Blondie – and that the futuristic sound and themes were inspired by the band's fondness for science-fiction.

== Singles and EPs ==
Five songs from Truth Decay were in the form of singles and EPs, each with bonus materials such as unreleased b-sides, acoustic versions, and extended versions. One of the EPs, Dark Star, features a collaboration with Slimkid3 of The Pharcyde (who also appears in the Chil Kong-directed video choreographed by Yuri Tag of Kabba Modern (America's Best Dance Crew).

== Reviews ==
Truth Decay was released to numerous positive reviews, including a 9 out of 10 star rating from Outburn Magazine, which noted it as an "expertly crafted album." Many publications noted the album's concept and rock opera-like structure. Karen Bliss of AOL's Noisecreep.com wrote, "The 14-track recording (Truth Decay) centers on the world's dramatic, apocalyptic end and how life cycles into new chapters, sometimes with sudden force." Campus Circle cited it as "a high concept recording with a story arc about star-crossed lovers in a futuristic world where apocalypse and rebirth are looming." Erica Ramon of Hits Daily Double wrote, "ONE TO WATCH – a multifaceted band out of Hollywood that is quickly gaining steam."

== Awards ==
Truth Decay (and its related releases) received two Hollywood Music in Media Awards: one for Best Alternative Artist and one for Best Male Vocal for ShyBoy's performance of the Donna Summer song "On the Radio" (the b-side to the single "Welcome To The Future").

== Track listing ==
No.	Title	Length
1.	"Dark Star"	4:37
2.	"The March"	3:54
3.	"Apocalyptic Love Song"	4:52
4.	"Worship Me (I'm on TV)"	3:27
5.	"Welcome to the Future"	4:04
6.	"Things Will Never Be the Same"	4:07
7.	"Kill the Humans"	4:00
8.	"Static"	4:01
9.	"Lucy"	4:18
10.	"Never Coming Back"	3:57
11.	"Last Man on Earth"	4:47
12.	"Rusty Moon"	4:25
13.	"Dark Star: End Transmission"	1:15
14.	"Cellar Door"	4:16
Total length:		55:22
