= Of Jupiter and Moons =

Studio album by Temperance
- Released: 20 April 2018
- Genres: Power metal, symphonic metal
- Length: 46:50
- Label: Scarlet

Temperance chronology
The Earth Embraces Us All (2016)	Of Jupiter and Moons (2018)	Viridian (2020)

Professional ratings
Review scores
Source	Rating
Eternal Terror	3/6
Hallowed	5/7
Metal Temple	10/10

Of Jupiter and Moons is the fourth studio album by Italian power metal band Temperance. It is the first album to feature singers Alessia Scolletti and Michele Guaitoli, the former replacing female vocalist Chiara Tricarico who left the band the previous year. It was released via Scarlet Records on 20 April 2018. It was produced by Jacob Hansen, known for his production work with Volbeat, Epica, and Amaranthe. The album has received positive feedback.

== Track listing ==
Of Jupiter and Moons track listing
No.	Title	Length
1.	"The Last Hope in a World of Hopes"	4:50
2.	"Broken Promises"	4:32
3.	"Of Jupiter and Moons"	4:04
4.	"Everything That I Am"	3:30
5.	"We Are Free"	4:57
6.	"Alive Again"	3:57
7.	"The Art of Believing"	5:15
8.	"Way Back Home"	4:21
9.	"Empires and Men"	4:05
10.	"Daruma's Eyes (Part 1)"	7:15
Total length:		46:50

== Personnel ==
Temperance

- Alessia Scolletti – female clean vocals
- Michele Guaitoli – male clean vocals, keyboards
- Marco Pastorino – guitars, harsh vocals
- Luca Negro – bass
- Alfonso Mocerino – drums
