= Illumishade =

Swiss band

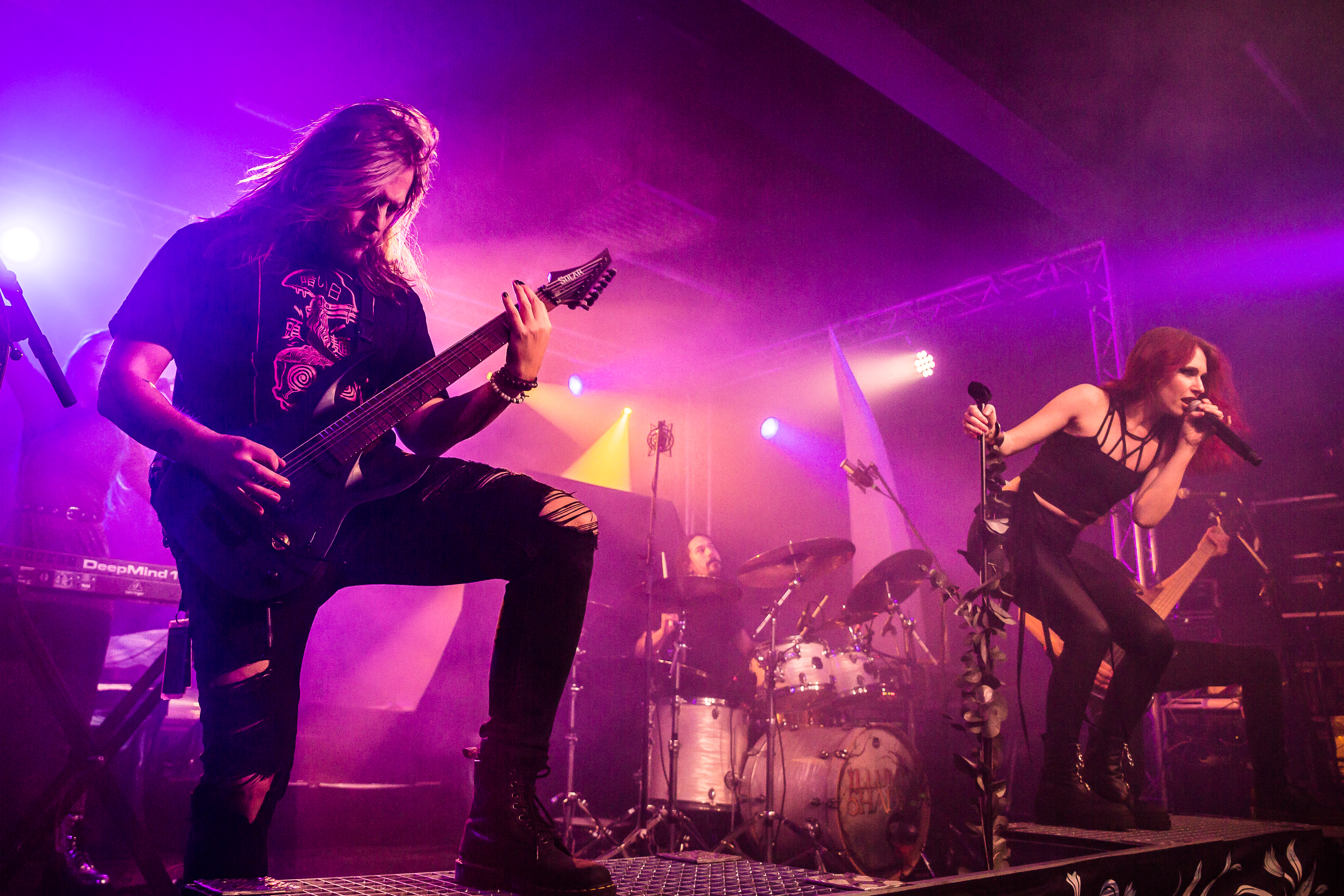
- Illumishade performing in 2024

Background information
- Origin: Switzerland
- Genres: Progressive metal; symphonic metal
- Years active: 2019–present
- Label: Napalm
- Members: Fabienne Erni; Jonas Wolf; Mirjam Skal; Yannick Urbanczik; Marc Friedrich

Illumishade is a Swiss progressive metal band. The band was founded in 2019 by Eluveitie band members Fabienne Erni and Jonas Wolf and makes cinematic and fantasy music, combined with rock and heavy metal. They are currently signed to Napalm Records. The band's name is a combination of the English words illumination and shade and refers to the contrast between light and darkness that emerges in the songs, as well as the contrast between quiet and heavy songs.

== History ==
Illumishade was created because Erni had to put together a music concept and band to obtain her master's degree in September 2018. Afterwards, all band members decided to continue the band and record an album.

The first single "World's End" was released on 5 February 2020, followed just over a week later by the second single "Rise". On 15 May 2020, the band self-released their debut studio album Eclyptic: Wake of Shadows. The album was well received.

On 14 and 15 April 2023, Illumishade played a concert in the Netherlands for the first time, after an earlier concert in 2021 was canceled due to the COVID-19 pandemic. In July 2023, the band signed a contract with Napalm Records. The second studio album, Another Side of You, was released in February 2024. At the same time, a European tour was announced. From April to May 2024, they went on their first North American tour as a support act for Korpiklaani.

== Band members ==
- Fabienne Erni – lead vocals, keyboards
- Jonas Wolf – guitar, backing vocals
- Mirjam Skal – keyboards, backing vocals
- Yannick Urbanczik – bass
- Marc Friedrich – drums

== Discography ==
=== Studio albums ===
- Eclyptic: Wake of Shadows (2020)
- Another Side of You (2024)
- Unholy Ghosts (2027)

=== EPs ===
- Eclyptic: Wake of Shadows – 5th Anniversary Orchestral Editions (2025)

=== Singles ===
Year	Title	Album
2020	"World's End"	Eclyptic: Wake of Shadows
2020	"Rise"	Eclyptic: Wake of Shadows
2020	"Muse of Unknown Forces"	Eclyptic: Wake of Shadows
2020	"Into the Unknown" (Frozen II cover)	Non-album singles
2021	"The Endless Vow"	Non-album singles
2021	"Destined Path"	Non-album singles
2022	"Elegy"	Another Side of You
2023	"Hymn"	Another Side of You
2023	"Enemy"	Another Side of You
2023	"Here We Are"	Another Side of You
2024	"Cloudreader"	Another Side of You
2024	"Riptide"	Another Side of You
2026	"Paralyzed"	Unholy Ghosts
2026	"Heatwave"	Unholy Ghosts
2026	"The River"	Unholy Ghosts

=== Promotional singles ===
Year	Title	Album
2020	"Crystal Silence"	Eclyptic: Wake of Shadows
2020	"Rise" (Live Acoustic Version)	Non-album singles
2021	"What Have I Become" (Live Acoustic Version)	Non-album singles
